= 2024 in Philippine music =

The following is a list of events and releases related to Philippine music that have happened or are expected to happen in 2024.

== Events ==
- January 14 – The ninth edition of the Wish 107.5 Music Awards is held at the Araneta Coliseum. The award concludes with boy band SB19 and rapper Flow G tying for the most wins with four.
- January 17 – Filipino contestants Elisia Parmisano and Gehlee Dangca, as well as Filipino-Korean singer Jin Hyeon-ju (known as Belle of the K-pop girl group Cignature), win the South Korean reality show Universe Ticket, officially joining the eight-member girl group Unis.
- January 27 – Rea Gen Villareal of Caloocan wins the seventh season of the Tawag ng Tanghalan segment on It's Showtime.
- March 6 – Rivermaya and The Dawn are among the inductees of the Eastwood City Walk of Fame.
- March 7 – Sarah Geronimo receives the Global Force Award at Billboard Women in Music, becoming the first Filipino recording artist to be awarded by Billboard magazine.
- March 19 – "Selos", a song by Mindanao-based independent artist Shaira released in December 2023, is voluntarily pulled from selected music streaming platforms by her agency AHS Productions following a notice from Australian singer Lenka, whose song "Trouble Is a Friend" shared a similarity of the song's tune. AHS Productions has re-released the song following a cover licensing agreement with Lenka's management on April 11.
- April 14 – Radio station Wave 89.1 FM ceases operations after 49 years on air.
- April 20:
  - Kim Hewitt, a wildcard from Dumaguete, Negros Oriental wins the second kids edition of Tawag ng Tanghalan on It's Showtime.
  - The Camarines Sur-based Baao Children and Youth Choir wins the 29th Certamen Internacional Juvenil de Habaneras y Polifonia held in Torrevieja, Spain.
- April 26 – The winners of the 14th and 15th editions of the PMPC Star Awards for Music are simultaneously announced, with SB19 dominating with the most wins.
- May 19 – Jillian Pamat of Bukidnon wins the third season of The Voice Teens.
- May 24 – P-pop girl group Bini are featured in the American magazine Teen Vogue as one of "12 Girl Groups to Watch in 2024".
- June 14 – MC Mateo of Manila wins the inaugural season of the Tanghalan ng Kampeon segment on TiktoClock.
- June 16 – P-pop girl group Bini becomes the first Filipino act to reach the No. 1 spot on Spotify's Top Artists Philippines after two years of top foreign artist dominance.
- July 13 – Boy band SB19 win the Favorite Asian Act award at the 2024 Kids' Choice Awards by Nickelodeon.
- October 27 – The 16th edition of PMPC Star Awards for Music is held at Carlos P. Romulo Auditorium, RCBC Plaza in Makati, with SB19 has the most wins with four.
- November 11 – P-pop girl group Bini wins the Best Asian Act at 2024 MTV Europe Music Awards held at Manchester, United Kingdom.
- November 21:
  - The 17th edition of Myx Music Awards is held at ABS-CBN Broadcasting Center in Quezon City, with rapper Al James, and P-pop groups Bini and SB19 tying for the most wins with two.
  - Tala Gatchalian wins the second season of Tanghalan ng Kampeon segment on TiktoClock.
- December 4 – The 37th edition of Awit Awards will be held at the Manila Hotel in Manila, with Bini has the most wins with five. "Raining in Manila" by Lola Amour was hailed as the Song of the Year, while Unique Salonga's album Daisy was hailed as the Album of the Year.
- December 11 – Former Tawag ng Tanghalan finalist Sofronio Vasquez wins the 26th season of The Voice (U.S.).
- December 12 – Music magazine Rolling Stone Philippines is officially launched.
- December 14 – Naya Ambi of Las Piñas wins the sixth season of The Clash.
- December 15 – Nevin Adam Garceniego of Quezon City wins the sixth season of The Voice Kids.
- December 18 – The 37th edition of Aliw Awards is held at the Manila Hotel.

== Debuting acts ==
=== Bands ===
- 11th St.
- AECH
- Aster
- Eclypse
- Fly Mama!
- Letters from June
- Magicvoyz
- Outcast
- Pix!e
- Radkidz (Pablo and Josue)
- Ratavii
- Sala
- TVJ Singing Queens
- Wrive
- Yaelokre

=== Solo artists ===
- Alyssa Muhlach
- Barb. (Leanne Mamonong)
- Cianne Dominguez
- Darlene
- Gaz Magalona
- Geraldine Jennings
- Ian Cumabig
- Jerms
- John Ephraim Tirol (JET)
- Justin
- Kai del Rio
- Keisha Paulo
- Liana Castillo
- Loenna
- Marko Rudio
- Nyx Nasal
- Olarvina
- Plume
- Ryannah J
- Stell
- Yza Santos

== Reunions/Comebacks ==
- Sinosikat?
- Sugar Hiccup

== Disbanded ==
- Ver5us

== Released in 2024 ==
=== First quarter ===
==== January ====
Date	Single / album	Artist(s)	Genre(s)	Label(s)	Ref.
1	We Made It	Nik Makino	Hip hop/rap	Diamond Management	
1	Blessed	Yuridope	Hip hop/rap	Independent	
1	Runway	Sica, Karencitta	Hip hop/rap	Greenhouse Records	
3	Gemini	Michael Pacquiao	Hip hop/rap	Oblivion Paradise	
3	Imperial Manila	Aidan Bernales	Pop	Independent	
5	I Need You	Sam Mangubat	Pop	Dreamzone	
5	Despedida	Mt. Lewis	Pop	Offshore Music; Sony Music Philippines	
5	HBD	Maki	R&B/soul	Tarsier Records	
5	Lamona	Sean Jefferson, Demy	R&B/soul	unstable records	
5	Retribution	Tala	Indie pop	Sony Music Philippines	
7	Kung Ang Puso	Zephanie	Pop	Republic Records Philippines (UMG Philippines)	
7	Iba Pa 'Yon	Lightskeen Baby	Hip hop/rap	Independent	
10	Better Than Fairytales (EP)	Lilfina	Pop	Sony Music Philippines	
11	Relapse	I Belong to the Zoo	Alternative rock	Independent	
12	Pulso	Zack Tabudlo	Pop	Republic Records Philippines (UMG Philippines)	
12	Broken String	Fred Engay	Pop	Orieland	
12	Lover Girl (EP)	Jikamarie	Pop	Warner Music Philippines	
12	Lisan	Jennylyn Mercado	Pop	GMA Music	
12	Sila	Nyx Nasal	Pop	Sony Music Philippines	
12	As Above So Below	Eliza Marie (feat. Paul Monserrate)	Pop	Offshore Music; Sony Music Philippines	
12	Ayayay	Michael Keith	Pop	Viva Records	
12	Labandero	Gloc-9	Hip hop/rap	Universal Records	
12	Tropamilya	1096 Gang	Hip hop/rap	Independent	
12	Blue Dreams	Apekz, Sica	Hip hop/rap	Independent	
12	Airbnb	Cookie$	Hip hop/rap	The Backeshop Studios	
12	More In Seconds	Darla Baltazar	R&B/soul	Wings Music Group	
12	Hello	Tota	Alternative rock	Off the Record; Sony Music Philippines	
13	Change	Leah Halili	Alternative pop	Independent	
14	Determinado	Radkidz	Pop	Sony Music Philippines	
14	Closer You and I	Adie	Pop	O/C Records	
19	Love It All Out	Morissette, Greg Gould	Pop	Dreamhouse Records	
19	Ikaw Pa Rin	Hey Its Je	Pop	Independent	
19	Lumayas Ka	Paolo Santos	Pop	Evolution Media	
19	Kelan	Brisom	Pop	Sony Music Philippines	
19	Kasama Ka	Marko Rudio	Pop	Star Music	
19	Good Karma	Marlo Mortel	Pop	Star Music	
19	Bagong Tradisyon	Toneejay	Alternative rock	Marilag Recordings International	
19	Hindi Ko Alam	Carousel Casualties	Alternative rock	Offshore Music; Sony Music Philippines	
19	Bahaghari (Halika Na)	Sandiwa	Alternative rock	Universal Records	
19	Aurora	LaLuna	Alternative rock	Independent	
19	Historia	Skygarden	Alternative rock	AltG Records	
19	Flyyy	Playertwo, Felip	Hip hop/rap	Warner Music Philippines	
19	Go	R!s, Yuridope	Hip hop/rap	Independent	
19	Flight Zone	Lua$	Hip hop/rap	Independent	
19	Kiss	Zae	Hip hop/rap	Rawstarr Records	
19	Good Trip	Flict G (feat. Bei Wenceslao)	Hip hop/rap	Sony Music Philippines	
19	Playsafe	Realest Cram, Nateman	Hip hop/rap	GhostWorldwide	
19	Sinta	Yves Villamor	Indie pop	Independent	
19	Liham	Kiana Valenciano	R&B/soul	JDP Everything Entertainment	
19	Daisies	Tiana Kocher	R&B/soul	Manila Music	
19	Hiraya	Ratavii	Indie rock	Independent	
21	4th Impact (EP)	4th Impact	P-pop	Independent	
22	Kakayanin Ko	Jemay Santiago	R&B/soul	Sony Music Philippines	
24	Sugal	Maja	Pop	Crown Studios	
24	Isang Beses	Jom, ALLMO$T, Jasmine	Hip hop/rap	Viva Records	
24	Crazy N'Luv	Jr Crown	Hip hop/rap	Sony Music Philippines	
25	Morena	Sandwich	Pop rock	PolyEast Records	
26	Kasing Kasing	Juan Karlos (feat. Kyle Echarri)	Ballad	Island Records Philippines (UMG Philippines)	
26	Hulaan	Janine Teñoso	Pop	Viva Records	
26	Minsan Lang	Iluna	Pop	Evolution Media	
26	Kinulayan (Album)	Raven	Pop	Sony Music Philippines	
26	Mental Gymnasium (EP)	Kio Priest	Pop	Star Music	
26	Never	Thea Astley	Pop	Universal Records	
26	Matter Over Mind	Nicole Laurel Asensio	Pop	Warner Music Philippines	
26	Last Na 'To	Vanessa Mendoza	Pop	Warner Music Philippines	
26	INOWY (I'm Not Okay Without You)	Vilmark	Pop	GMA Music	
26	Still So In Love	Nameless Kids	Alternative rock	Tarsier Records	
26	Sa Kahapon	Dilaw, Janine Berdin	Alternative rock	Coke Studio Philippines	
26	Kapit	Dwta, Alamat	Songwriter	Coke Studio Philippines	
26	Slow Burn	Illest Morena	Hip hop/rap	Independent	
26	Kalangitan	Guddhist Gunatita	Hip hop/rap	Independent	
26	Makulit Ka	Teys, YP	Hip hop/rap	unstable records	
26	Purpose	Lua$	Hip hop/rap	Independent	
26	Bakeshop Radio	Bakeshopboyz	Hip hop/rap	The Backeshop Studios	
26	Suit and Tie	Kyle Zagado	Hip hop/rap	Campus Music Records	
26	Isang Gabi Lang	J-King	Hip hop/rap	Evolution Media	
26	Tulay	Plan B	Hip hop/rap	Sony Music Philippines	
26	Bumabalik	John Roa, Skusta Clee	Hip hop/rap	Viva Records	
26	20:20 (Album)	Vxon	P-pop	Republic Records Philippines (UMG Philippines)	
26	Eksena	Yara	P-pop	Sony Music Philippines	
26	Don't You Worry	Darla Baltazar	Indie pop	Wings Music Group	
26	Sana'y Nandito Ka	Akong Ayalam	Alternative folk	Independent	
26	2 Afraid	Lucas Miguel	R&B/soul	Underdog Music PH	
26	Magbalik 2.0	Lily	Alternative rock	UMG Philippines	
27	And Solemn (EP)	Belle Mariano	Pop	Star Music	
28	Mikasa	Arthur Nery, Janine Berdin	Pop	Viva Records	
29	Bagong Simula	A$tro	Hip hop/rap	Independent	
30	Akala	Radkidz	Pop	Sony Music Philippines	
31	Klaro	Hale	Alternative rock	EMI Records (UMG Philippines)	
31	Magbago	Snakefight	Punk pop	Tower of Doom	
31	WYD	Gab	Indie pop	Independent	
31	Foreign	Lightskeen Baby	Hip hop/rap	Independent	
31	Back To Back	Repablikan	Hip hop/rap	Sony Music Philippines	
31	Ani Ng Sining, Bayang Malikhain	Karylle, Yael Yuzon (feat. Centro Escolar University Singers)	Pop, Choir	National Commission for Culture and the Arts	
31	Nothing In Mind (Album)	Thursday Honey	Indie rock	O/C Records	

==== February ====
Date	Single / album	Artist(s)	Genre(s)	Label(s)	Ref.
1	Kung Uulitin	Yeng Constantino	Pop	Republic Records Philippines (UMG Philippines)	
1	Sa'yo	Raf Davis	Hip hop/rap	Independent	
2	Atin Ang Gabi	Mark Carpio	Pop	Independent	
2	Atin Ang Mundo	Vehnee Saturno	Pop	Saturno Music	
2	Tago	Ayip	Pop	Baybayin Records	
2	Babaeng Torpe	Gracenote	Pop rock	EMI Records (UMG Philippines)	
2	The Fool	Franco	Alternative rock	MCA Records (UMG Philippines)	
2	Pano	Caren Tevanny	Alternative rock	Curve Entertainment	
2	Pagdali	Playertwo, Felip	Hip hop/rap	Warner Music Philippines	
2	Luv U Back	MaxxyPresko	Hip hop/rap	Independent	
2	Paalam	Jay Abordo	Indie pop	Mabuhay Music Group	
2	Sagip	Jam Roberts	Indie pop	Warner Music Philippines	
2	Mabunying Samurai	Rey Malipot, Tinig Barangka	Contemporary; Christian	Jesuit Music Ministry	
3	Pabagain	Third Flo'	Hip hop/rap	Independent	
4	Sabado Nasad	Southvibes	Hip hop/rap	Independent	
4	Pangaji	CLR, Apekz	Hip hop/rap	Theartistco	
4	Himig At Pag-ibig (EP)	Kristina Dawn	R&B/soul	Downtown Q' Entertainment	
5	Whatever	Armi Millare	Pop	DaWorks Entertainment	
7	Rewritten Promise	Jason Marvin	Pop	Sony Music Philippines	
7	Tamang Kilig	Hazel Faith (feat. Tiara Shaye)	Pop	Sony Music Philippines	
7	Tawagan Mo Ako	Repablikan (feat. Lors Ligaya and OG Sacred)	Hip hop/rap	Sony Music Philippines	
9	Ang Paghuwat	Morissette, Ferdinand Aragon	Pop	Underdog Music PH	
9	Nangungulila Sa'yo	Noah Alejandre	Pop	Warner Music Philippines	
9	Hardin	Kayl Garcia	Pop	Evolution Media	
9	Iyo	Darren Espanto	Pop	Star Music	
9	Pwede Ba Kitang Ligawan?	The Juans	Pop rock	Viva Records	
9	Lahat Ng Bukas	Cup of Joe	Alternative pop	Viva Records	
9	BNK	Because	Hip hop/rap	Viva Records	
9	Mga Buang (Cypher2)	1096 Gang	Hip hop/rap	Independent	
9	Nakakalito	Seann Jefferson, Teys	Hip hop/rap	unstable records	
9	Poems	Zeke Abella	Hip hop/rap	Independent	
9	Outtaspaze	Lua$	Hip hop/rap	Independent	
9	Ikaw Lang	$ho	Hip hop/rap	Independent	
9	Slum	Gra The Great	Hip hop/rap		
9	Don't Matter	Denise Julia (feat Denȳ)	R&B/soul	Sony Music Philippines	
9	Tayo	Le John	R&B/soul	Independent	
9	Deserve	Brayll	R&B/soul	Independent	
9	Umibig Muli	Peter Miranda	R&B/soul	Independent	
9	Patintero	BGYO	P-pop	Star Music	
9	1621BC (EP)	1621BC	P-pop	Star Music	
9	Hey Love	Press Hit Play	P-pop	Sony Music Philippines	
9	Daydream	Darlene	P-pop	Universal Records	
9	Parating Ka Na	Rosima	Alternative rock	Independent	
9	Tayo'y Magkikita	Moontyde	Alternative rock	Independent	
9	Goin' Standard (Album)	Edgar Mortiz	Standard, Ballad	Curve Entertainment	
9	Ngayon At Kailanman	Amiel Sol	Indie pop	Ivory Music and Video	
10	AMAFILIPINA	Marina Summers	LGBT	Tarsier Records	
11	U Lost?	Supafly	Hip hop/rap	Greenhouse Records	
12	Kusapiling	Anthony Meneses	R&B/soul	Kartha Studios	
12	Ang Galing DITO	Alamat	P-pop	Dito Telecommunity	
13	Paulit-ulit	Dione	P-pop	Warner Music Philippines	
13	Pahinga (Album)	Jemay Santiago	R&B/soul	Sony Music Philippines	
14	Tayo Na Lang	Nobita	Alternative rock	Sony Music Philippines	
14	Eyes Only On Me	Jay R, Regine Velasquez	R&B/soul	Homeworkz Entertainment Services	
14	My Everything	CK YG, Young Blood Neet	Hip hop/rap	GhostWorldwide	
14	Tayo Pa Rin	Jr Crown	Hip hop/rap	Sony Music Philippines	
14	Pretty Girl	Michael Pacquiao	Hip hop/rap	Oblivion Paradise	
14	Lubos Lubos	Paul Cassimir	Hip hop/rap	Independent	
14	Be Yours	Cliff	Indie pop	Warner Music Philippines	
15	Nowhere	TJ Monterde	Pop	Independent	
15	Plano	Guddhist Gunatita	Hip hop/rap	Independent	
16	My Mind	Sarah Geronimo (feat. Billy Crawford)	Pop	Viva Records; G Productions	
16	Totoo	Jed Baruelo	Pop	Sony Music Philippines	
16	Tell Me	Martin Nievera	Pop	Vicor Music	
16	Ika'y Nag-iisa	Katrina Velarde	Pop	Viva Records	
16	To My Friend's Ex	Elise Huang	Pop	Underdog Music PH	
16	GRIT (EP)	Anji Salvacion	Pop	Star Music	
16	Pag Ang Puso Ang Nagsabi	JM dela Cerna, Marielle Montillano	Pop	Star Music	
16	Bakit	Zachary	Pop	Star Music	
16	Burnout	Jao	Pop	PolyEast Records	
16	Someday In Your Life	John Rex	Pop	GMA Music	
16	Nothing's Gonna Change My Love For You	Erik Santos, Julie Anne San Jose	Pop, Ballad	Star Music	
16	Anything	Mayonnaise	Pop rock	Sony Music Philippines	
16	Ikaw Na	Calvin de Leon	Hip hop/rap	Independent	
16	Gabing Malamig	Ghetto Gecko	Hip hop/rap	Independent	
16	Ang Sakit Mo Na	Joshua Mari	Hip hop/rap	Independent	
16	1017	Lua$	Hip hop/rap	Independent	
16	Be With You	The Ridleys	Indie rock	Underdog Music PH	
16	Sinta (Ikaw Lamang)	Clubs	Indie rock	Warner Music Philippines	
16	Don't Need To Look	Darla Baltazar	Indie pop	Wings Music Group	
16	Citrine (Album)	Mt. Lewis	Indie pop	Offshore Music; Sony Music Philippines	
16	Free	Dom Guyot	R&B/soul	Independent	
16	Away Bati	Kiana Valenciano	R&B/soul	JDP Everything Entertainment	
16	Boses	Valley of Chrome	Heavy metal	Tower of Doom Music	
16	Off The Line	11th St.	Funk	Warner Music Philippines	
18	ILY	Young Blood Neet	Hip hop/rap	Independent	
21	Bulong	Omar Baliw	Hip hop/rap	Independent	
21	Hay	Project: Romeo	Alternative pop	Independent	
21	Sueño	Doughbaby, Shantel Cyline	Indie pop	unstable records	
21	Kinulayan (Album)	Raven	Pop	Sony Music Philippines	
23	Hoodie	Dionela (feat. Alisson Shore)	Pop	EMI Records (UMG Philippines)	
23	Wishing Well	Morissette	Pop	Underdog Music PH	
23	Nananaginip	Hey Its Je	Pop	Independent	
23	Lutang	Amy Nobleza	Pop	Independent	
23	Napaibig	DaivJstn	Pop	Viva Records	
23	Inday	Will Mikhael	Pop	Universal Records	
23	What Is It All About	Nicole Laurel Asensio, Solo Cal	Pop	Warner Music Philippines	
23	Lambing (EP)	Abby Clutario	Pop	GMA Music	
23	Sabik	Illest Morena	Hip hop/rap	Independent	
23	Want U	Jeff Grecia	Hip hop/rap	Independent	
23	Kaya Ko Na	Leks, Teys	Hip hop/rap	unstable records	
23	Wag Na	Rajondo, Dreycruz	Hip hop/rap	unstable records	
23	Ms. Universe	Soulthrll	Hip hop/rap	Independent	
23	Balibag	Lua$	Hip hop/rap	Independent	
23	Libutin Natin Ang Mundo	Aziatik	Hip hop/rap	Independent	
23	Social Climber	J-King	Hip hop/rap	Evolution Media	
23	Ma Baby	John Roa	Hip hop/rap	Viva Records	
23	May Iba Na	Mike Kosa, Mayo Marte	Hip hop/rap	Diamond Management	
23	Monica	3 Digitz	Hip hop/rap	Star Music	
23	Lihim	Mrld	Indie pop	O/C Records	
23	Tahan Na	Dwta (feat. Arthur Miguel)	Indie pop	Sony Music Philippines	
23	Nonsense	Darla Baltazar	Indie pop	Wings Music Group	
23	Alfonso	Mario Talavera	Indie pop	3AM Records	
23	Hulog Ng Langit	Ekai	Indie pop	Warner Music Philippines	
23	PK	Grin Department	Punk rock	Independent	
23	Sige, Sayaw!	Dear Dahlia	Pop rock	Universal Records	
23	Drama	Brisom (feat. Ica Frias)	Alternative pop	Sony Music Philippines	
23	Burn Your Fears Away	Judy Benitez	R&B/soul	Mabuhay Music Group	
23	Heartcalling	Sinosikat?	R&B/soul	Warner Music Philippines	
23	Ikaw Lang Talaga	Naïv	R&B/soul	Yellow Room Music	
23	Remember	AECH	Alternative rock	Independent	
24	Thankful	Jnske	R&B/soul	Independent	
24	Babygirl	Zae	Hip hop/rap	Rawstarr Records	
24	Kabog	Salbakuta	Hip hop/rap	Red Parrot Music	
25	Oh No, I'm Falling in Love Again	Rees Gonzales	Indie pop	unstable records	
25	Flutter	Ana Luna	Indie pop	Independent	
25	Di Kita Trip	CK YG	Hip hop/rap	GhostWorldwide	
27	Gusto	Brian Pepito	Pop	Independent	
27	Freshco	J emm Dahon, King Lheanard, Ez J	Hip hop/rap	Independent	
28	Surreal	Justin	Pop	Sony Music Philippines	
28	Miraculous Ways	Gloryfall	Contemporary Christian	Waterwalk Records	
28	Sino Daw	Omar Baliw	Hip hop/rap	Independent	
28	Friend Zone	A$tro	Hip hop/rap	Independent	
29	Sinta	JKris	Hip hop/rap	Independent	
29	I'm Done	Skusta Clee	Hip hop/rap	Saucy Island Records	

==== March ====
Date	Single / album	Artist(s)	Genre(s)	Label(s)	Ref.
1	Sariling Isip	Noah Alejandre, Loenna	Pop	Warner Music Philippines	
1	Planeta	Keiko Necesario	Pop	Independent	
1	Business	JM Bales	Pop	Independent	
1	I Like You, I Do	Sam Benwick	Pop	Vicor Music	
1	This Too Shall Pass	Penelope	Pop	FlipMusic	
1	Ipasa Mo	Vanz Vanaobra	Pop	PolyEast Records	
1	Nawala Ka Lang Bigla	EJ de Perio	Pop	Sony Music Philippines	
1	Ganon Ka Rin?	Demy	R&B/soul	Sony Music Philippines	
1	Hollywood	Kris Delano (ft. Hev Abi)	Hip hop/rap	Blanktapes	
1	Megumi	Yuridope	Hip hop/rap	Independent	
1	S.O.S. (Some Old Story)	Guddhist Gunatita	Hip hop/rap	Independent	
1	Burgis	Flow G, Hev Abi	Hip hop/rap	Independent	
1	Ngayong Wala Ka Na	Agsunta	Alternative rock	Barhaus Talent Management	
1	Huwag Nang Lumayo Sa Akin	Winrich Adarlo	Indie pop	Independent	
1	Beautiful	Plume	Ballad	GMA Music	
1	Awit ng Paghahandog	Pansol Choir	Contemporary Christian	Jesuit Music Ministry	
2	Daytour	Hori7on	Pop-punk	MLD Entertainment	
2	Misteryo	Yza Santos	Pop	Saturno Music	
6	Tampuhan	Jason Marvin	Pop	Sony Music Philippines	
6	Magsabi Ka Lang	Jason Dy	Pop	Star Music	
6	It's Only A Paper Moon	Beabadoobee	Alternative pop	Apple Video	
7	Wag Naman	The Cohens	Rock	Independent	
7	Lusong	Akong Ayalam	Alternative folk	Independent	
8	Maria Clara	Sugarcane	Pop	Warner Music Philippines	
8	Un-break My Heart	Nasser Amparna	Pop	Curve Entertainment	
8	Sweeter	Darla Baltazar	Pop	Wings Music Group	
8	Skin2Skin	Lesha	Pop	Careless Music	
8	Sunny Cebu	Sansette	Pop	Offshore Music; Sony Music Philippines	
8	Oh Pag-ibig	Joseph John	Pop	Independent	
8	Ang Jowa Mong Tigang	Miguel Ordon	Pop	Independent	
8	Bakit	Paula Alcasid	Pop	Ember Music	
8	Hanggang Ngayon Na Lang	Keisha Paulo	Pop	Star Music	
8	Traffic	Cianne Dominguez	Pop	Star Music	
8	Ikaw Na Talaga	Olarvina	Pop	Viva Records	
8	Aking Sinta	The 12/21	Pop punk	Black Sheep Productions	
8	Swoosh	Alex Bruce	Hip hop/rap	Sony Music Philippines	
8	Trifecta (EP)	Skusta Clee, Flow G	Hip hop/rap	Panty Droppaz League	
8	OCD	Rajondo, Teys	Hip hop/rap	unstable records	
8	Likana	J emm Dahon, King Lheanard	Hip hop/rap	Independent	
8	Oras	Leona	Indie rock	Universal Records	
8	I'm Wrong	KRNA	Alternative rock	Independent	
8	Talaarawan (EP)	Bini	P-pop	Star Music	
8	Yours	Rienne	Indie pop	Off the Record; Sony Music Philippines	
8	Sct. Rallos	Tota	Rock	Off the Record; Sony Music Philippines	
8	Pasyong Pilipino (Compilation)	Pansol Choir, Musicam Sacram Ensemble	Contemporary Christian	Jesuit Music Ministry	
8	Halina't Lumapit sa Diyos ang Awa	Hangad	Contemporary Christian	Jesuit Music Ministry	
9	Nandyan Pa Ba?	6cyclemind, Gloc9, Josh Villena, Bayang Barrios	Pop rock	Sony Music Philippines	
9	Tequilla Rose	Hellmerry, Al James	Hip hop/rap	Sony Music Philippines	
9	Pano Na?	Lo Ki	Hip hop/rap	Viva Records	
10	Kahit Gaano Kainit	The Flackos, Morobeats, JMara	Hip hop/rap	Independent	
13	Namimiss Ko Na	Lola Amour	Alternative rock	Warner Music Philippines	
13	Saglit	Tihtus	Alternative rock	Sony Music Philippines	
13	Believing In Magic (Yakap Mo)	Alexa Ilacad, Belle Mariano, Francine Diaz	Pop	Star Music	
13	Solid Kang Kasama	Michael Pacquiao	Hip hop/rap	Oblivion Paradise	
14	Skrtttt	Calvin de Leon	Hip hop/rap	Independent	
14	Naisip	Brxn	Pop	Independent	
15	Headtone	Janella Salvador	Pop	Star Music	
15	Dito Sa'kin	Earl Agustin	Pop	Vicor Music	
15	Huling Pahina	Jen Cee	Pop	TMP Productions	
15	The Same	Arron Rebustes	Pop	PolyEast Records	
15	Langhiya	Joshua Feliciano	Pop	Viva Records	
15	Para Lang Sa'yo	Ronnie Liang	Pop	Universal Records	
15	Unravel (Album)	Adjeng	Pop	Independent	
15	Acid Na Blue	JRLDM (feat. Guddhist Gunatita, and Kiyo)	Hip hop/rap	Warner Music Philippines	
15	Umiibig Sa'yo	Aziatik, Dro Perez	Hip hop/rap	Independent	
15	Gang	Ghetto Gecko	Hip hop/rap	Independent	
15	Benda	$ho	Hip hop/rap	Independent	
15	Wag Ka Sa Geng Geng	Joshua Mari	Hip hop/rap	Independent	
15	Anghel	Jeko Royo	Hip hop/rap	unstable records	
15	Eroplanong Papel	Rocksteddy (feat. Anne Curtis)	Alternative rock	Sony Music Philippines	
15	Hi, Tita!	Sala	Indie rock	AltG Records	
15	Huling El Bimbo (Live at 2022 Eraserheads Reunion Concert)	Eraserheads	Rock	Sony BMG Entertainment	
15	Talagsaon	Hometown Kids	Cebuano pop	OC Music	
15	Heartache Generation	Ena Mori	Electronic	Offshore Music	
16	Within	Kris Lawrence, Ladine Roxas	R&Bl/soul	Saturno Music	
19	Mwah	Kristina Dawn	R&B/soul	Downtown Q' Entertainment	
20	Kung Ayaw Mo Na Sa Akin	Drei Raña	Pop	PolyEast Records	
20	Walang Iba	Jin Chan	Pop	Waybettr	
20	Teka Lang	Kunns, Sharlie Magne	Hip hop/rap	Independent	
21	Right Lover, Wrong Time	Jayda Avanzado	Pop	Republic Records Philippines (UMG Philippines)	
21	Oo, Alam Ko	Steven Peregrina	R&B/soul	Blanktapes	
21	Saan	A$tro	Hip hop/rap	Independent	
21	Sumusunod	Kingpilz, Rish Mel, Ednil Beats	Hip hop/rap	Independent	
21	Bagsakan	No Pressure Collective	Hip hop/rap	Independent	
22	Little Paradise	TJ Monterde	Pop	Independent	
22	Sikulo	Maki, Angela Ken, Nhiko	Pop	Tarsier Records	
22	Umuwi Na Tayo	John Roa	Pop	Viva Records	
22	Buti Na Lang	Justin Vasquez	Pop	Republic Records Philippines (UMG Philippines)	
22	Tama Pa Ba?	Six Part Invention	Pop	Star Music	
22	Get Up!	Timmy Albert	Pop	Universal Records	
22	Wildest Dreams	Ayip	Pop	Baybayin Records	
22	What Do You Say	Shell Tenedero	Pop	Cheerful Music	
22	Oras-oras	Rap Sanchez	Pop	FlipMusic	
22	Nene	SunKissed Lola	Alternative rock	Independent	
22	Lihim (Rosas)	Clubs	Indie rock	Northern Root Records	
22	Relax	Cinco de Kalyo	Pop punk	Ember Music	
22	Low	ALLMO$T	Hip hop/rap	Viva Records	
22	Alyado	Teys	Hip hop/rap	unstable records	
22	Kuwarto	Vnce	Hip hop/rap	Independent	
22	Good or Bad	Lua$	Hip hop/rap	Independent	
22	Wala Nga!	Jerome Banaay	Hip hop/rap	Independent	
22	All Day	Lucas Miguel	R&B/soul	Underdog Music PH	
22	Strangers Again	Shane G	Indie pop	Sony Music Philippines	
22	Watermelon Sugar (Acoustic)	Nef Medina	Indie pop	Evolution Media	
22	Kaluluwa Ni Kristo	Pansol Choir	Contemporary Christian	Jesuit Music Ministry	
23	Segundo, Siguro	Arthur Nery	Pop	Viva Records	
23	Yoko Na	Al James, Josh Cullen	Hip hop/rap	Sony Music Philippines	
24	Homecoming (Album)	Victory Worship	Contemporary Christian	Victory	
27	Fuego	Calvin de Leon	Hip hop/rap	Independent	
27	Kutsinta	Tothapi	Indie rock	Sony Music Philippines	
29	Patrene	Noah Alejandre	Pop	Warner Music Philippines	
29	Coffee Cup (Revisited version)	Paolo Santos	Pop	Evolution Media	
29	Till My Heartaches End	Chlara	Pop	Evolution Media	
29	Cruise Control	Lyn Lapid, Whethan	Pop	Republic Records Philippines (UMG Philippines)	
29	Kwarto	Anna Aquino	Pop	PolyEast Records	
29	Angels Brought Me Here	Sam Mangubat, Reiven Umali	Pop	Dreamzone	
29	Kawal Pilipino	Ronnie Liang	Patriotic	Independent	
29	Face of God	December Avenue	Christian rock	Tower of Doom Music	
29	Soul Talk (Album)	Darla Baltazar	Contemporary Christian	Wings Music Group	
29	Crucem Tuam (Pagpaparangal Sa Krus Na Banal)	Young Voices of the Philippines	Contemporary Christian	Jesuit Music Ministry	
29	Padayon	Kiyo	Hip hop/rap	Independent	
29	Solo Flight	Jeff Grecia	Hip hop/rap	Independent	
29	Magkasalungat	David La Sol	Indie pop	Nine Degrees North	
29	I Know My Worth	Nicole Laurel Asensio, Nicole Tejedor, Vanessa Celestial	Pop rock	Warner Music Philippines	
29	Prinsesa Ng Gabi	Kahel	Indie rock	KDR Music House	
29	Minuto	Written by the Stars	Rock	Warner Music Philippines	
31	Beautiful Day (EP)	The Company	A capella, Contemporary Christian	Star Music	
31	Run Deep	UDD	Indie pop	Viva Records	
31	4Getchu	Young Blood Neet	Hip hop/rap	Independent	
31	Heart So Cold	Lightskeen Baby	Hip hop/rap	Independent	

=== Second quarter ===
==== April ====
Date	Single / album	Artist(s)	Genre(s)	Label(s)	Ref.
2	Selos Na Yan Friend	Shaira	Bangsamoro Pop	AHS Productions	
2	Yorokobi Feesu	CK YG	Hip hop/rap	Independent	
3	Snowbrrr	E.J.	Hip hop/rap	Blanktapes	
4	Tatawag Ulit	Nateman	Hip hop/rap	HTRB Records	
5	Fake Face	Felip	Pop	Warner Music Philippines	
5	Kailan Ba Ako Magiging Masaya?	Shane Dandan	Pop	Viva Records	
5	Karapat-Dapat	Kakai Bautista	Pop	Star Music	
5	Magmamahal Pa Rin	Ralph Padiernos	Pop	Star Music	
5	What's Wrong with Secretary Kim (Original Soundtrack)	Various artists	Pop	Star Music	
5	Bet	Denise Julia	R&B/soul	Sony Music Philippines	
5	Ikaw	Agsunta	Alternative rock	Barhaus Talent Management	
5	Napagod Na	The Juans	Pop rock	Viva Records	
5	Pantasya	Zo zo	Hip hop/rap	Viva Records	
5	Iyakin	Yzkk	Hip hop/rap	Independent	
5	Ang Init	Carlos Agassi	Hip hop/rap	Independent	
5	Umaycan	Noel Cabangon	Alternative folk	Widescope Entertainment	
5	bubblebath	Tala, Pikunin	Indie pop	Sony Music Philippines	
6	AG Back Again	Alex Gonzaga	Hip hop/rap	AG Records	
10	Ilang Araw Na	Michael Pacquiao	Hip hop/rap	Oblivion Paradise	
10	Walang Duda	Droppout	Hip hop/rap	Independent	
10	Dinggin	Daniel Paringit	Indie pop	EMI Records (UMG Philippines)	
10	Lola Amour (Album)	Lola Amour	Alternative rock	Warner Music Philippines	
11	Hangover	A$tro	Hip hop/rap	Independent	
11	Apoy (EP)	Jr Zero	Hip hop/rap	GroundZero Records	
12	Maling Panahon	Arthur Miguel	Pop	Warner Music Philippines	
12	Kapag Kapiling Kita	Hey Its Je	Pop	Independent	
12	Right Guy Wrong Place	Shell Tenedero	Pop	Cheerful Music	
12	Until Tonight	The Bloomfields	Pop	Lilystars Records	
12	Believing In Magic (Yakap Mo)	Alexa Ilacad	Pop	Star Music	
12	Minsan Pa	Ima Castro	Pop	PolyEast Records	
12	Crisostomo	Joema Lauriano	Pop	Viva Records	
12	Panauhin	Juan Caoile	R&B/soul	Viva Records	
12	thru2u	Lustbass, Jess Connelly, Jason Dhakal	R&B/soul	Independent	
12	Oh Yeah	Lo Ki	Hip hop/rap	Viva Records	
12	Luv Letter	SwKeith, YP	Hip hop/rap	Independent	
12	Imahe	Kyleaux, E.J.	Hip hop/rap	Independent	
12	Ride Wt Me	JtheKidd	Hip hop/rap	Independent	
12	Aurora	Alisson Shore	Hip hop/rap	Labyrinth Records	
12	Samo	Erik Villanueva	Hip hop/rap	Mabuhay Music Group	
12	'Di Madali Pero Kaya	Gaz Magalona	Hip hop/rap	Mabuhay Music Group	
12	Ikot	Over October	Alternative rock	Underdog Music PH	
12	You Did It	KAIA	P-pop	Sony Music Philippines	
12	Universe (Pluss version)	Pluus	P-pop	Universal Records	
12	Universe (YGIG version)	YGIG	P-pop	Universal Records	
12	H.U.G.	6ense	P-pop	Blvck Entertainment	
13	Hindi Na	OLG Zak, CK YG, Yuridope	Hip hop/rap	GhostWorldwide	
13	GaGraduate	Carlos Agassi	Hip hop/rap	Independent	
14	Sunday Morning	Justin	Pop	Sony Music Philippines	
15	Paanong Gagawin	Kristina Dawn	R&B/soul	Downtown Q' Entertainment	
15	PAPURI! 40th Anniversary Album (Album)	Various artists	Contemporary Christian	FEBC/SAVED Media	
18	BBF	Lightskeen Baby	Hip hop/rap	Independent	
19	Yugto	JM Bales	Pop	Independent	
19	Paruparo	Lai Buñag	Pop	Independent	
19	Museo	Eliza Maturan	Pop	unstable records	
19	Ara Mina (Anniversary Edition) (Album)	Ara Mina	Pop	Star Music	
19	Sobrang Solid	Nik Makino, Nexxfriday	Hip hop/rap	Diamond Management	
19	Manatili	Clien, ALLMO$T	Hip hop/rap	Viva Records	
19	KAGM	Ron David, Robledo Timido	Hip hop/rap	Independent	
19	Alak at Sindi	Jeko Royo, Teys, Dreycruz	Hip hop/rap	unstable records	
19	Alam Mo Naman	Colt, Mmonn	Hip hop/rap	Independent	
19	Aurora	Toneejay	Alternative rock	Marilag Recordings International	
19	Pahinga	Calein	Indie rock	Independent	
19	Aminin	naÏba	Indie rock	Alpha Records	
19	Iisa	Jikamarie (feat. JRLDM)	R&B/soul	Warner Music Philippines	
19	Body	Dom Guyot	R&B/soul	Independent	
19	Para Sa'yo (Album)	Yves Villamor	Indie pop	Independent	
19	One Sided Love	G22	P-pop	Republic Records Philippines (UMG Philippines)	
19	Nakita Ko Ang Tubig (Vidi Aquam)	Pansol Choir	Contemporary Christian	Jesuit Music Ministry	
19	Pamaskong Tupa	Young Voices of the Philippines	Contemporary Christian	Jesuit Music Ministry	
20	Munchies	Illest Morena	Hip hop/rap	Independent	
20	Banal Na Tao	Guddhist Gunatita	Hip hop/rap	Independent	
20	9/11: Bomba Na	Jr Crown, Bomb D	Hip hop/rap	Sony Music Philippines	
22	Lanamantayo	Kenaniah	Alternative rock	O/C Records	
23	Baby Kosa	Nateman, Bigbaby Enzo	Hip hop/rap	HTRB Records	
24	Minahalagad	Because, Hev Abi	Hip hop/rap	Viva Records	
24	Tatlong Buwan	Sponge Cola	Rock	Sony Music Philippines	
24	19	Shanni	Indie pop	Sony Music Philippines	
24	My Soul	Gloryfall	Christian	Waterwalk Records	
25	Sariling Mundo (Album)	TJ Monterde	Pop	Independent	
25	Salamat Ika'y Dumating	Angeline Quinto	Pop	Star Music	
26	Sana Ako Pa Rin	Fred Engay	Pop	Orieland	
26	Sabihin	Zephanie	Pop	Republic Records Philippines (UMG Philippines)	
26	Don't Lose Sight of Your Heart	Benj Pangilinan	Pop	Sony Music Philippines	
26	Paano Kung Tayo	Claudine Co	Pop	Just Music Philippines	
26	Oxytocin	Kat Jaranilla	Pop	The Cozy Cove	
26	Bebegurl	Liana Castillo	Pop	GMA Music	
26	Asan Ka Na	SV Squad	Pop	Independent	
26	Dahas	Kjwan	Rock	Independent	
26	Tula't Awitin	Dear Dahlia	Pop rock	Universal Records	
26	Echoes	Brisom	Pop rock	Sony Music Philippines	
26	Balik-balikan	Sleep Alley	Alternative rock	Independent	
26	Wants And Needs	Kris Delano, Sica, Just Hush	Hip hop/rap	Blanktapes	
26	999 (EP)	Yoki	Hip hop/rap	Independent	
26	Ako G Lang	Jimmy Pablo	Hip hop/rap	Warner Music Philippines	
26	Pwede Bang Dito Ka Muna?	Healy After Dark	Alternative pop	O/C Records	
26	Sweet Release	Kiana Valenciano	R&B/soul	Independent	
26	Good Enough	CRWN (feat. Jason Dhakal)	R&B/soul	Pool Records; Sony Music Philippines	
26	Isa Dalawa Tatlo	Press Hit Play	P-pop	Sony Music Philippines	
27	Mascot	Eclypse	P-pop	GKD Labels	
28	Brownout	Carlos Agassi	Hip hop/rap	Independent	
29	Ligaw	JET, Jay R	R&B/soul	Homeworkz Entertainment Services	
30	Wala Na	JC Regino	Pop	GMA Music	
30	Talunan	Nateman	Hip hop/rap	HTRB Records	
30	Maybe I'm Tired	Rees Gonzales	Indie rock	unstable records	

==== May ====
Date	Single / album	Artist(s)	Genre(s)	Label(s)	Ref.
1	Manibela	Hey Its Je	Pop	Independent	
2	Jersey Baby (EP)	Lightskeen Baby	Hip hop/rap	Independent	
2	Babala	Yeng Constantino	Pop	Republic Records Philippines (UMG Philippines)	
3	Kahit 'Di Mo Ko Nakikita 2	Iñigo Pascual	Pop	Republic Records Philippines (UMG Philippines)	
3	Moonlight	SB19, Ian Asher, Terry Zhong	Pop	Liquid State	
3	I Wanna Go	Armi Millare	Pop	DaWorks Entertainment	
3	Hilo	Paul Pablo	Pop	Warner Music Philippines	
3	Akong Addiction	Will Mikhael	Pop	Universal Records	
3	Nagbago Ang Daigdig (from My Guardian Alien)	Zephanie	Pop	GMA Music	
3	Feels	Klarisse de Guzman	Pop	Star Music	
3	Ang Init Init	Imogen	Pop	Star Music	
3	Untrue	Meg Zurbito	Pop	Ivory Music and Video	
3	Sa Panaginip	Joseph John	Pop	BP Records	
3	Aurora (Album)	Toneejay	Alternative rock	Marilag Recordings International	
3	KYGM	The Ridleys	Indie rock	Underdog Music PH	
3	Gunita	Paham	Indie rock	Sony Music Philippines	
3	Malisya	Esseca	Hip hop/rap	314 Studios	
3	T*nginamo	Dank Puffs	Hip hop/rap	Independent	
3	IFLYSM	Jerome Banaay	Hip hop/rap	Independent	
3	The Buko Juice	Carlos Agassi	Hip hop/rap	Independent	
3	Di Ko Kasalanan	Demy (feat. Gins&Melodies)	R&B/soul	Sony Music Philippines	
3	Sunny When I'm With You	Ysanygo, Purplecat	R&B/soul	Underdog Music PH	
3	Foolishly	Lucas Miguel, Athena Gail	R&B/soul	Underdog Music PH	
5	Wag Na	Realest Cram, CK YG	Hip hop/rap	GhostWorldwide	
7	Metamorphic Obsession	Kristina Dawn	R&B/soul	Downtown Q' Entertainment	
7	7:07 (Hay Buhay)	Kai Buizon	Pop	Sony Music Philippines	
7	blue's melodies (EP)	rwyn	Pop		
8	Ang Mga Awitin Ng Normal Na Tao (Album)	Tanya Markova	Pop	Tower of Doom Music	
8	Alegorya (Album)	Munimuni	Indie rock	Sony Music Philippines	
8	Baddie	JP Bacallan	Hip hop/rap	Sony Music Philippines	
8	Running Out of Time	Michael Pacquiao	Hip hop/rap	Oblivion Paradise	
8	Scam Scam	Carlos Agassi	Hip hop/rap	Independent	
9	My Time	Raf Davis	Hip hop/rap	The Real Deal	
10	Papalayo	Zack Tabudlo	Pop	Republic Records Philippines (UMG Philippines)	
10	MU (EP)	Arthur Miguel	Pop	Warner Music Philippines	
10	Hanggang Kailan	Darren Espanto	Pop	Star Music	
10	Alas Dos Na	Janine Berdin	Pop	Island Records Philippines (UMG Philippines)	
10	'Di Ka Na Maalis	Sam Shoaf	Pop	Viva Records	
10	Inay	Keiko Necesario	Pop	Independent	
10	When You Love Someone	Sam Mangubat	Pop	Dreamzone	
10	Kung Saan Ka Masaya	Sponge Cola	Rock	Star Music	
10	Comets	Ben&Ben	Alternative folk	Sony Music Philippines	
10	Atensyon	Ame	Alternative rock	Evolution Media	
10	Lilito	Yves Villamor	Indie pop	Independent	
10	Pagod Na (Sa'yo)	Rhodessa	Indie pop	Viva Records	
10	Lagi	Clien, Jom, ALLMO$T, Kxle	Hip hop/rap	Viva Records	
10	Arkila	Meek&Chill, K-Ram, Mhot	Hip hop/rap	Music Colony Records	
10	Alabang	Seann Jefferson	Hip hop/rap	Independent	
10	Ano Gawa Mo	Kyl Aries	Hip hop/rap	Independent	
10	I Hate Boys	G22	P-pop	Republic Records Philippines (UMG Philippines)	
12	Séance (Album)	CRWN	Electronic	Pool Records; Sony Music Philippines	
12	Hirana	Crimason	Songwriter	Independent	
12	Kahapon	Carissa, John Roa	Alternative pop	Tower of Doom Music	
15	Dogcat	J emm Dahon	Hip hop/rap	Independent	
15	Hangover	Plan B	Hip hop/rap	Sony Music Philippines	
16	Be A Friend	Timmy Cruz	Pop	UpTimmystic Music	
16	Kunan Mong Pic	Al James, O Side Mafia, Brgr	Hip hop/rap	Sony Music Philippines	
16	Pinangakuan	Nateman	Hip hop/rap	HTRB Records	
17	Feel This Way	Zack Tabudlo	Pop	Republic Records Philippines (UMG Philippines)	
17	Misteryoso	Cup of Joe	Pop	Viva Records	
17	Umayos Ka	Joema Lauriano	Pop	Viva Records	
17	Ika'y Diwata	Ian Cumabig	Pop	Viva Records	
17	Back From the Dead	Lyn Lapid, Mxmtoon	Pop	Mercury Records (UMG Philippines)	
17	Pag Tinadhana	Zsa Zsa Padilla	Pop	Star Music	
17	Delikado, Baby	Frizzle Anne	Pop	Independent	
17	Ako Ba Talaga	Alisson Shore, Klly	Hip hop/rap	Labyrinth Records	
17	Broadway Freestyle	Kris Delano	Hip hop/rap	Blanktapes	
17	You're Mine	Zae	Hip hop/rap	Rawstarr Records	
17	Solid Kagabi	Jimmy Pablo	Hip hop/rap	Warner Music Philippines	
17	Dito Na Lang	SJ Maglana, Jom	Hip hop/rap	Independent	
17	Asa Ka	Hero	Hip hop/rap	Independent	
17	Stay Here With You	Hilera	Rock	Yellow Room Music; Sony Music Philippines	
17	A Dream of Sunrise	Breē	Indie folk	Offshore Music; Sony Music Philippines	
17	Sagot Sa Aking Dasal	Erik Santos	Contemporary; Christian	Star Music	
18	Panaginip Ko	Mark Carpio, Thyro Alfaro	Pop	Independent	
20	Letting Go	Curtismith, Six The Northstar	Hip hop/rap	Sony Music Philippines	
21	Titig	Jnske	R&B/soul	Independent	
22	Dragon	Mayonnaise	Pop rock	Yellow Room Music; Sony Music Philippines	
22	Malambing Pag Lasing	Jr Crown	Hip hop/rap	Sony Music Philippines	
23	Paborito	Justine Peña	Pop	FlipMusic	
24	Limang Taon	Juan Karlos	Pop	Island Records Philippines (UMG Philippines)	
24	Dilaw	Maki	Pop	Tarsier Records	
24	Paradiso (Album)	Jace Roque	Pop	Star Music	
24	Sige Na Sorry	Janno Gibbs	Pop	Viva Records	
24	Hiling	Chan Millanes	Pop	PolyEast Records	
24	Kinakaya	Gel Aquino	Pop	GMA Music	
24	Ang Ineet!	Hey Its Je	Pop	Independent	
24	You'll Never Feel Alone Again	Earl Generao	Pop	Independent	
24	Hurt Me Too	James Reid	R&B/soul	Sony Music Philippines	
24	Subok Lang	Gloc-9	Hip hop/rap	Universal Records	
24	Purong Dalaga	Nateman	Hip hop/rap	HTRB Records	
24	Drunk Text	Matthaios	Hip hop/rap	Independent	
24	Sa Kamay Ng Diyos Mixtape (EP)	MaxxyPresko	Hip hop/rap	Independent	
24	Pakita Mo	$ho	Hip hop/rap	Independent	
24	'Di Na Posible	Similar Sky	Indie rock	The Cozy Cove	
24	Once	Chris Cantada	Indie rock	Independent	
24	You, Me, & Love (EP)	Yes My Love	P-pop	Republic Records Philippines (UMG Philippines)	
24	I Beg To Fall In Love With Thee, My Lord (A capella)	Hangad	Contemporary; Christian	Jesuit Music Ministry	
24	LIVING AWAKE (Album)	AWAKE84	Praise and Worship	Victory	
27	Hihintayin Pa Rin Kita	Ambo Dolores	Pop	Hambog Production	
27	Gangsta Affection	CK YG	Hip hop/rap	Independent	
28	All Day	Kris Delano	Hip hop/rap	Blanktapes	
29	Kahit Hirap Kong Mahalin	Nateman	Hip hop/rap	HTRB Records	
29	Chronicles of Promdi	King Promdi	Hip hop/rap	Toxic Lifestyle	
29	This Na Malambing	Ryannah J, Nateman	R&B/soul	Rawstarr Records	
30	Binhi	Rees Gonzales	Indie pop	unstable records	
31	Oh, Giliw	Adie	Pop	O/C Records	
31	Anghel	Angelo Garcia	Pop	Vicor Music	
31	Ilaw Lang Mahal	DaivJstn	Pop	Viva Records	
31	Gumuho	Juana Cosme	Pop	Saturno Music	
31	Tumitig Ka	Ferodina	Pop	Ivory Music and Video	
31	Another Life	Kylix	Pop	Universal Records	
31	ulit-ulitin: the dahan-dahan trilogy (EP)	Lola Amour	Pop	Warner Music Philippines	
31	Dating Ikaw	Mint Magic	Pop	Warner Music Philippines	
31	Kahit Pa Anong Mangyari	Keiko Necesario	Pop	Independent	
31	Mananatili	Andrej Agas	Pop	Independent	
31	Ready	Apl.de.ap, SB19	Pop	Sony Music Philippines	
31	Pauwi Na 'Ko (Dito Ka Na Lang)	Dwta	Indie pop	Sony Music Philippines	
31	Thanks For Everything (Album)	Mayonnaise	Pop rock	Yellow Room Music; Sony Music Philippines	
31	DRUGS (Album)	Shanti Dope	Hip hop/rap	Universal Records	
31	So Fly	Fern	Hip hop/rap	Island Records Philippines (UMG Philippines)	
31	Insomnia	King Lheanard	Hip hop/rap	Viva Records	
31	Butterfly	Colt	Hip hop/rap	Independent	
31	Bubungan	Ian Tayao	Hip hop/rap	Independent	
31	Daydream	Sitti	Bossa Nova	Widescope Entertainment	
31	Er Er	Steven Peregrina	R&B/soul	Blanktapes	
31	Sinasantabi	Ron David	R&B/soul	RealWrldStudios	
31	Mas Gusto Kita	Yden	R&B/soul	Independent	
31	Outta Retirement	Termula	R&B/soul	Independent	
31	Skined	Faspitch	Metal	Tower of Doom Music	
31	Bwak, Bwak, Bwak!	Vice Ganda	Trap	Star Music	
31	On This Day	Hangad	Contemporary; Christian	Jesuit Music Ministry	
31	Ningas ng Pag-asa	Jamie Rivera (feat. 92AD)	Contemporary; Christian	Inspire Music	
31	Dimensions (Album)	Various artists	Indie	Offshore Music	

==== June ====
Date	Single / album	Artist(s)	Genre(s)	Label(s)	Ref.
2	Sumaya	Josh Cullen	Pop	Sony Music Philippines	
5	Break Time	Reese Lansangan, Neat	Pop	WithStand	
7	Distansya	Rob Deniel, Janine Teñoso	Pop	Vicor Music	
7	Tanga Mo Juan	Juan Karlos	Pop	Island Records Philippines (UMG Philippines)	
7	Asar Talo	Elijah Canlas	Pop	Island Records Philippines (UMG Philippines)	
7	Sining	Dionela (feat. Jay R)	Pop	EMI Records (UMG Philippines)	
7	Nanaman	UDD	Pop	Viva Records	
7	Ulit Ulit	Regine Velasquez	Pop	Star Music	
7	Atin Ang Gabi	Paul Pablo	Pop	Warner Music Philippines	
7	Afternoon	Muri	Pop	Warner Music Philippines	
7	Tala	Nica del Rosario	Pop	FlipMusic	
7	Lalaluv	Noah Alejandre	Pop	Independent	
7	Sari-Sari Story	Gloc-9	Hip hop/rap	Universal Records	
7	Sumfling	Alex Bruce	Hip hop/rap	Sony Music Philippines	
7	Passenger Princess	Pisces.MN, Sy	Hip hop/rap	Baybayin Records	
7	Apeshit	Apekz, Loonie	Hip hop/rap	Independent	
7	Awitin Mo, Isasayaw Ko	Jason Dhakal	R&B/soul	Warner Music Philippines	
7	'Di Bale Nalang	Lipip	R&B/soul	314 Studios	
7	Paalam Muna	Matt Wilson	R&B/soul	Wild Dream Records	
7	Talaarawan	Ekai	Indie pop	Warner Music Philippines	
7	Kailangan Mo Ba Ang Puso Ko	Frank Ely	Alternative pop	Evolution Media	
7	Maghihintay	Modern Day Dream	Alternative rock	Independent	
7	Gigil	BGYO	P-pop	Star Music	
7	5 Minutes	Hangad	Contemporary; Christian	Jesuit Music Ministry	
8	High Street (Original Soundtrack)	Various artists	Pop	Star Music	
10	Makaluma	Wilbert Ross	Pop	Viva Records	
12	Summertime	MNL48	P-pop	HalloHallo Entertainment	
12	The Stand (Tagalog ver.)	Gloryfall	Contemporary; Christian	Waterwalk Records	
13	Cvnty	Stef Aranas	Pop	Offshore Music; Sony Music Philippines	
13	Di Pa Rin Sapat (Ang Sahod)	Pinkmen	Folk rock	Offshore Music; Sony Music Philippines	
14	Room	Stell	Pop	Warner Music Philippines	
14	Gupit	The Juans, Alamat	Pop	Viva Records	
14	Iyakin	Shane Dandan	Pop	Viva Records	
14	'Di Inibig	Ataska Mercado	Pop	Viva Records	
14	Fruitcake	Yeng Constantino	Pop	BMG Records	
14	Iisa lang	Lani Misalucha	Pop	Star Music	
14	Run Run	Chlara	Pop	Evolution Media	
14	Hindi Babae Lang	Janah Rapas	Pop	Hallwood Recordings	
14	Nabalaka	Range	Hip hop/rap	Independent	
14	Toyo	BTDTbeats	Hip hop/rap	Independent	
14	Palihim	El Cide	Hip hop/rap	Independent	
14	Soundcheck	Dello	Hip hop/rap	Sony Music Philippines	
14	Katawan Flow	Yara	P-pop	Sony Music Philippines	
14	Paligoy-ligoy	6ense	P-pop	Blvck Entertainment	
14	Runnin'	Dione	P-pop	Warner Music Philippines	
14	Bye	Steliza	R&B/soul	Mabuhay Music Group	
14	Kumalas	Gabo Gatdula	Indie pop	O/C Records	
14	Bituin	Letters from June	Indie pop	KDR Music House	
14	Say It Clear Say It Loud	Antenorcruz, John Mark Saga, Raven Heyres	LGBT	Star Music	
14	For One More Day	Hangad	Contemporary; Christian	Jesuit Music Ministry	
15	Sariling Digmaan	Boi's	Alternative indie	FahrAway Music Publishing	
15	Mollyna	OLG Zak	Hip hop/rap	GhostWorldWide	
16	My Life	Paul N Ballin	Hip hop/rap	Rawstarr Records	
17	Strawberry Lane Freestyle	Gins&Melodies	Hip hop/rap	Independent	
17	Ratatat	A$tro	Hip hop/rap	Independent	
19	Option	Michael Pacquiao	Hip hop/rap	Oblivion Paradise	
19	Yayaman	Sean Archer	Rock	Sony Music Philippines	
20	Segurista	Zild Benitez	Pop	Island Records Philippines (UMG Philippines)	
21	Sad Songs and Bullshit (Part 2) (Album)	Juan Karlos	Pop	Island Records Philippines (UMG Philippines)	
21	Dahan Dahan	Fred Engay	Pop	Orieland	
21	Nandito Na Ako	Benj Pangilinan, Angela Ken	Pop	Sony Music Philippines	
21	Hey You	Janella Salvador	Pop	Star Music	
21	Sumugal	Hey Its Je	Pop	Independent	
21	Sandali	Mrld	Alternative pop	O/C Records	
21	Soup	Amiel Sol	Alternative pop	Ivory Music and Video	
21	Tyansa	Ang Dating Don Juan	Rock	Salamat Music Studio	
21	'Di Bale Na Lang	I Belong to the Zoo	Alternative rock	Independent	
21	Bakasyon	Carousel Casualties	Indie rock	Offshore Music	
21	Sari-Sari Story (Album)	Gloc-9	Hip hop/rap	Universal Records	
21	Dikapamigay	Realest Cram	Hip hop/rap	GhostWorldWide	
21	Training Day (Album)	Bugoy Na Koykoy	Hip hop/rap	Independent	
21	Foreign	Dom Guyot, Omesi	R&B/soul	Independent	
21	Bawat Pintig	Hangad	Contemporary; Christian	Jesuit Music Ministry	
27	I'll Be Somebody You Want	Jolianne	R&B/soul	Sony Music Philippines	
28	Pulot	Jireh Lim	Pop	Warner Music Philippines	
28	Langit	Jed Baruelo	Pop	Sony Music Philippines	
28	Bini (Duet Version)	Jeremy G. (feat. Aiah Arceta)	Pop	Star Music	
28	When I'm Gone	Lesha	Pop	Careless Music	
28	Sori	Paolo Santos	Pop	Evolution Media	
28	Walang Label	Eugene Layug	Pop	O/C Records	
28	Paalam	Alyssa Muhlach	Pop	Tarsier Records	
28	Prom	Arron Rebustes	Pop	PolyEast Records	
28	Lila	Pastel Sky	Pop	The Cozy Cove	
28	I'll Only Let You Down	Shell Tenedero	Pop	Cheerful Music	
28	Love	Jepzie	Pop	Independent	
28	Para Lang Sa'yo	Nef Medina	Indie pop	Evolution Media	
28	Highschool	Shanti Dope	Hip hop/rap	Universal Records	
28	Boyfriend	ALLMO$T	Hip hop/rap	Viva Records	
28	My Boo	Jr Crown	Hip hop/rap	Sony Music Philippines	
28	Let Me	Playertwo	Hip hop/rap	Warner Music Philippines	
28	Sinungaling	Matthaios	Hip hop/rap	Independent	
28	All In	Shehyee	Hip hop/rap	Independent	
28	Malaimpyerno/Dehins	Zo zo	Hip hop/rap	Independent	
28	Sagipin	Guddhist Gunatita	Hip hop/rap	Independent	
30	Sin City	CK YG, OLG Zak	Hip hop/rap	GhostWorldWide	
30	Puntirya	Ryannah J	R&B/soul	Rawstarr Records	

=== Third quarter ===
==== July ====
Date	Single / album	Artist(s)	Genre(s)	Label(s)	Ref.
1	Atin Ang Walang Hanggan	SunKissed Lola	Alternative rock	Star Music	
1	Galit	Jnske, Bullet D	Hip hop/rap	Independent	
3	Your Universe	Moira Dela Torre	Pop	Republic Records Philippines (UMG Philippines)	
3	Hanggang Sa Dulo	Diego Gutierrez	Pop	Sony Music Philippines	
4	Gigising Na Ako	Renz Verano	OPM, Pop	PolyEast Records	
4	Minumulto	Jo Pasaron	OPM, Pop	M.R. Studio	
4	Palihim	Raf Davis	Hip hop/rap	The Real Deal	
5	7sins (Album)	Felip	Pop	Warner Music Philippines	
5	Believe (EP)	Belle Mariano	Pop	Star Music	
5	Pagkatapos ng Lahat	Ralph Padiernos	Pop	Star Music	
5	Alon	Never the Strangers	Pop	Island Records Philippines (UMG Philippines)	
5	Wish U the Worst	Jed Madela	Pop	Independent	
5	Diwatang Mahiwaga	JM Bales	Pop	Independent	
5	Desperate Hours	Barbie Almalbis	Pop rock	Independent	
5	Debu	Gloc9, Arvy-T	Hip hop/rap	Universal Records	
5	17B	Cookie$	Hip hop/rap	The Bakeshop Studios	
5	Sana Hindi Na Lang	Kylu, Matt Wilson	Hip hop/rap	Ivory Music and Video	
5	Pinapasan	Guddhist Gunatita, Nateman	Hip hop/rap	Independent	
5	Nasaan Yung Tayo	Joshua Mari (ft. Still One)	Hip hop/rap	Independent	
5	Sabik	Kyle Zagado, Kydd Curti$	Hip hop/rap	Independent	
5	Kumusta	Winrich Adarlo	Indie pop	Independent	
5	Oh Giliw Ko	The Knobs	Alternative rock	Universal Records	
5	Lumang Gunita	Sandiwa	Alternative rock	Universal Records	
9	Bingo	Aster	P-pop	AsterisK Music	
10	Hanggang Kailan (Umuwi Ka Na Baby)	The Vowels They Orbit	Pop	Sony Music Philippines	
10	Lia	Zild	Rock	Island Records Philippines (UMG Philippines)	
11	Off-Center	Armi Millare	Pop	DaWorks Entertainment	
11	Cherry on Top	Bini	P-pop	Star Music	
11	Embroidered Na Sumbrero	Lightskeen Baby	Hip hop/rap	Independent	
11	One Last Chance (reimagined)	Lorraine Galvez	Pop	M.R. Studio	
12	Basta't Alam Kong Tayo	Iñigo Pascual	Pop	Republic Records Philippines (UMG Philippines)	
12	Sirens	Paolo Sandejas	Pop	Sony Music Philippines	
12	Pati Ng Ulan	Jikamarie	Pop	Warner Music Philippines	
12	Back Home to You	Cliff	Pop	Warner Music Philippines	
12	Strawberry (Album)	Javi That's Me	Pop	Independent	
12	I'm In Love	Ysabelle Cuevas	Pop	Independent	
12	Kasayaw	Kiss N Tell	Rock	Soupstar Music	
12	Meteorite	MidSummer	Pop rock	KDR Music House	
12	Salbabida	Ben&Ben	Alternative folk	Star Music	
12	Prinsesa	Kenaniah	Indie pop	O/C Records	
12	Damgo	Angelo Rudy	R&B/soul	Independent	
12	Kuhang-kuha	Frizzle Anne	R&B/soul	Independent	
12	Balang Araw Ay Mapapangiti	Gracenote, Zel Bautista	Pop rock	EMI Records Philippines (UMG Philippines)	
12	Wishful Thoughts (EP)	Peyton	Standards	Star Pop	
12	Di ba Wala	Crakky, ALLMO$T	Hip hop/rap	Viva Records	
12	Pula	Zo zo, Crakky	Hip hop/rap	Viva Records	
12	No Love	Ramdiss	Hip hop/rap	Universal Records	
12	Gusto Ko Sa'kin Ka Lang	Robledo Timido	Hip hop/rap	RealWrldStudios	
12	Ganun Talaga	1096 Gang	Hip hop/rap	Independent	
12	All Night Long	Ghetto Gecko	Hip hop/rap	Independent	
12	Baggages	Zeke Abella	Hip hop/rap	Independent	
15	El Chapo	Kristina Dawn	R&B/soul	Downtown Q' Entertainment	
15	Nandito Ako	Philip Mahoney	R&B/soul	Homeworkz Entertainment Services	
15	Color Clash	Wrive	Pop	Star Music	
17	Mine	Young Blood Neet	Hip hop/rap	Independent	
17	Night and Day	Shoti	Pop	Sony Music Philippines	
17	Night and Day	Brian Pepito	Pop	Independent	
18	Nabuang	Hey Its Je	Pop	Independent	
18	Modern Girl	Lotti	R&B/soul	Independent	
19	Philpop Himig Handog 2024 (Original Soundtrack)	Various artists	OPM	Star Music	
19	Kaibigan	Justin	Pop	Sony Music Philippines	
19	Panalangin	Syd Hartha	Pop	Sony Music Philippines	
19	Loved For Once	Jayda Avanzado	Pop	Republic Records Philippines (UMG Philippines)	
19	WagNaMuna	Jerge	Pop	Evolution Media	
19	Mahal Na Yata Kita	Noah Raquel	Pop	Ostereo Limited	
19	Love Story Kong Bitin	Atasha Muhlach	Pop	Vicor Music	
19	Nandito	Figvres	Rock	Independent	
19	Nilalang	Dilaw	Alternative rock	Warner Music Philippines	
19	Kaakit-akit	Over October	Alternative rock	Underdog Music PH	
19	In Pursuit of Wonder (EP)	Healy After Dark	Alternative rock	O/C Records	
19	Pag-ibig	Guddhist Gunatita	Hip hop/rap	Independent	
19	Piging (Imbitado Ka)	Smugglaz	Hip hop/rap	Independent	
19	Langit at Lupa	Naïv	R&B/soul	Sony Music Philippines	
19	Syantu	Yah Bles	Reggae	KDR Music House	
19	River By the Sea	Leah Halili	Singer/songwriter	Independent	
19	Tamang Panahon (EP)	Marko Rudio	Pop	DNA Music	
20	Baeby	CLR	Hip hop/rap	Rawstarr Records	
21	Luho	Clien	Hip hop/rap	Loverboy Music	
21	Hiwaga	Tatin DC	Indie pop	Independent	
22	Chillin' Like A Villain	Pricetagg	Hip hop/rap	Rawstarr Records	
22	Fundador (Marcha de San Ignacio de Loyola)	Ateneo Boys Choir	Contemporary; Christian	Jesuit Music Ministry	
22	Pangalawa	Ambo Dolores	Pop rock	Hambog Productions	
24	Subomoto	Zae	Hip hop/rap	Rawstarr Records	
25	Felt Anxiety Yet Excited (Album)	Davidgocray (feat. Zeke Abella)	Hip hop/rap	Independent	
26	Pagbigyan	Sugarcane	Pop	Warner Music Philippines	
26	Rêve-toi	Muri	Pop	Warner Music Philippines	
26	Pinaglaban	Jason Marvin	Pop	Sony Music Philippines	
26	Miss	Darren Espanto	Pop	Star Music	
26	Kung Naging Tayo	Alexa Ilacad	Pop	Star Music	
26	Huling Ngiti	Marlo Mortel	Pop	Star Music	
26	The Only Exception	Regine Velasquez	Pop	Star Music	
26	Hawla (EP)	Keisha Pablo	Pop	Star Music	
26	Room For You	Grentperez, Lyn Lapid	Pop	AWAL Recordings America	
26	Trust Me	Ena Mori	Pop	Offshore Music	
26	Laruan	Marion Aunor	Pop	Wild Dreams Music	
26	No Changing of Love	Claudia Barretto	Pop	Viva Records	
26	Wala	The Bloomfields	Pop rock	Lilystars Records	
26	Halaga	The MNY	Pop rock	Vicor Music	
26	Miss Suzy	Better Days	Rock	Universal Records	
26	Gabi	Nameless Kids	Alternative rock	Tarsier Records	
26	Kaluluwa	Ame	Alternative rock	Evolution Media	
26	Love Is	The Ridleys	Indie rock	Underdog Music PH	
26	Real Love	Shanti Dope	Hip hop/rap	Universal Records	
26	Bukas Pa	Sica	Hip hop/rap	Greenhouse Records	
26	Akng Bhla Sayo	Just Hush	Hip hop/rap	Viva Records	
26	Buhay Parang Movie	Luci J	Hip hop/rap	Lucidreams	
26	Come On	Mananabaz	Hip hop/rap	Dongalo Wreckords	
26	Dahan Dahan	Yzkk	Hip hop/rap	Independent	
26	Misis	Viñas DeLuxe	LGBT	Star Music	
26	Twin Flames	Denise Julia, Thuy	R&B/soul	Sony Music Philippines	
26	Lutang	Sliz	R&B/soul	Independent	
26	Constancy (EP)	Brayll	R&B/soul	Independent	
26	Lampara	Press Hit Play	P-pop	Sony Music Philippines	
26	Bes I Luv U	AJAA	P-pop	Republic Records Philippines (UMG Philippines)	
26	Give Thanks to Our Lord	Himig Heswita	Contemporary; Christian	Jesuit Music Ministry	
30	Bittersweet	Rees Gonzales	Indie pop	unstable records	
31	Gitna	Nobita	Pop rock	Sony Music Philippines	
31	Kahit Saglit	Similar Sky	Pop rock	The Cozy Cove	

==== August ====
Date	Single / album	Artist(s)	Genre(s)	Label(s)	Ref.
1	Halikana	Ryannah J	R&B/soul	Rawstarr Records	
1	Round Trip	Mike Kosa	Hip hop/rap	Diamond Management	
2	Room	Stell	Pop	Warner Music Philippines	
2	Favorite	Timmy Albert	Pop	Universal Records	
2	You Made For Me (EP)	Vivoree	Pop	Star Music	
2	Malaki	Shaira	Pop	AHS Productions	
2	Tama Ka Na	Berto	Pop	Fascination St. Records	
2	Nagdadalawang Isip	Michael Librada	Pop	Independent	
2	Naliligaw	Magnus Haven	Pop rock	Vicor Music	
2	Mahanap Ka	Paham	Indie rock	Sony Music Philippines	
2	Yakal	Sud	Alternative	Sony Music Philippines	
2	Trippy	Apekz	Hip hop/rap	Independent	
2	Pinapasan	Guddhist Gunatita	Hip hop/rap	Independent	
2	Baby Blue	Fern, Dot.Jaime	Hip hop/rap	Island Records Philippines (UMG Philippines)	
2	Miss Don't Know It All	Kristina Dawn	R&B/soul	Downtown Q' Entertainment	
7	Isang Tugon	Sponge Cola	Rock	Sony Music Philippines	
9	Kalakal	SB19, Gloc-9	Pop, Hip hop/rap	Sony Music Philippines	
9	Sabado Night	Kylix	Pop	Universal Records	
9	Pakipot	Vnce	Pop	Independent	
9	Hmmm (Masasawi)	ALLMO$T	Hip hop/rap	Viva Records	
9	Ala	Gloc-9	Hip hop/rap	Universal Records	
9	Wasak	Owfvck (feat. Sica and Tu$ Brothers)	Hip hop/rap	Music Colony Records	
9	Sino Ka Ngayon	Kris Delano	Hip hop/rap	Blanktapes	
9	Tayo Sana	Matthaios, Yow	Hip hop/rap	Independent	
9	Namimiss Kita	SJ Maglana	Hip hop/rap	Independent	
9	Didapat	Hero, Jskeelz	Hip hop/rap	Independent	
9	Kuro	Hilera	Rock	Sony Music Philippines	
9	Superpower (Album)	Zild	Rock	Island Records Philippines (UMG Philippines)	
9	Segundo	Written by the Stars	Rock	Warner Music Philippines	
9	Analeigh	Gabby Parafina	R&B/soul	Independent	
9	Summotion	Pluss	P-pop	Universal Records	
9	Sayaw Na	Jopper Ril	Disco	Independent	
10	Bludevl (Album)	Hellmerry	Hip hop/rap	Sony Music Philippines	
11	Zebbiana	Daryl Ong	Pop	Independent	
14	Patay	Sean Archer	Rock	Sony Music Philippines	
15	Isa, Dalawa, Tatlo	Zack Tabudlo	Pop	Republic Records Philippines (UMG Philippines)	
15	AU	Nica del Rosario	Pop	FlipMusic	
16	Apat Na Buwan	Janine	Pop	Vicor Music	
16	Bulaklak Sa Buwan	Ely Buendia	Pop	Offshore Music	
16	Tanan	BJ Esporma	Pop	Warner Music Philippines	
16	Pangarap	EJ Clarks, GDee, Jby	Pop	Independent	
16	Tingin Mo Ba?	Johann Regaya	Pop	Independent	
16	Bakit Hindi Ka Crush Ng Crush Mo?	The Itchyworms	Rock	Star Music	
16	Pagkakataon (2024 version)	Shamrock, Katrina Velarde	Rock	Viva Records	
16	Kapoy	UDD (feat. Zoya)	Alternative rock	Viva Records	
16	Pages Decayed, Farewell (EP)	Pappel	Alternative pop	O/C Records	
16	Agad	Cookie$	Hip hop/rap	The Bakeshop Studios	
16	All That I Need	Jimmy Pablo	Hip hop/rap	Warner Music Philippines	
16	SNS	SwKidd, Jthekidd, YP	Hip hop/rap	Independent	
16	Hilig Mo	Unotheone	Hip hop/rap	Independent	
16	Malayo't Malaya	Kristina Dawn	R&B/soul	Downtown Q' Entertainment	
16	Ito Ang Diyakono	Pansol Choir	Contemporary; Christian	Jesuit Music Ministry	
17	Sixty of Plenty	Philippine Madrigal Singers	Classical	Independent	
19	4424	Gloc-9	Hip hop/rap	Independent	
21	Tango	Jarlo Base	R&B/soul	Sony Music Philippines	
22	Oh Binibini	Unxpctd, Ednil Beats	Hip hop/rap	Million Racks Records	
22	Rotysh!t Freestyle	Lightskeen Baby	Hip hop/rap	Independent	
22	Trash	BGYO	P-pop	Star Music	
23	Minsan	Ace Banzuelo	Pop	Sony Music Philippines	
23	Maoy sa Karaoke	Will Mikhael	Pop	Universal Records	
23	Dying to Know	Shell Tenedero	Pop	Cheerful Music	
23	'Di Sinasadya	Regine Velasquez	Pop	Star Music	
23	Sisig	Eliza Maturan	Pop	unstable records	
23	Nararamdaman	Carl Beley	Pop	unstable records	
23	Hilom	Bugoy Drilon	Pop	Select	
23	Wag Mo Akong Titigan	Magicvoyz	Pop	Viva Records	
23	Homeostasis	Barbie Almalbis	Pop rock	Independent	
23	Baterya	MOJOFLY	Pop rock	Sony Music Philippines	
23	Siga	One Click Straight	Alternative rock	Island Records Philippines (UMG Philippines)	
23	Nanlalamig	Drive of Daydreams	Alternative rock	7LC Records	
23	Sayang	Bill and the Judiths	Alternative rock	Independent	
23	All These and More (Album)	The Ridleys	Indie rock	Underdog Music PH	
23	Sante Fe	Sansette	Indie pop	Sony Music Philippines	
23	4 2nite	Shanti Dope	Hip hop/rap	Universal Records	
23	Baliw	Ramdiss	Hip hop/rap	Universal Records	
23	Freaky	Rajondo	Hip hop/rap	unstable records	
23	Bahay Namin Maliit Lamang (Album)	Hev Abi	Hip hop/rap	Independent	
23	Sunshine	Dominsuu, Calvin de Leon	Hip hop/rap	Independent	
23	Lingat	Joshua Mari	Hip hop/rap	Independent	
23	'Lang Nawawala	Demi (feat. Seann Jefferson)	R&B/soul	Sony Music Philippines	
23	Heartbeak Szn 3 (Album)	Because	R&B/soul	Viva Records	
23	Tubig at Liwanag	Pansol Choir	Contemporary; Christian	Jesuit Music Ministry	
23	Paalam Na	1st.One	P-pop	Warner Music Philippines	
23	Pockets	Gabba	Rock	A Spur of the Moment Project	
25	Like Me	Paul N' Ballin	Hip hop/rap	Rawstarr Records	
25	Dear	Gra the Great	Hip hop/rap	Independent	
26	Comets	Ben&Ben (feat. Petra Sihombing)	Alternative folk	Sony Music Philippines	
26	Sana	Kiana Valenciano	R&B/soul	Independent	
28	Palagi (TJxKZ version)	TJ Monterde, KZ Tandingan	Pop	Independent	
28	Call Me What You Want	Elise Huang	Pop	Underdog Music PH	
30	Namumula	Maki	Pop	Tarsier Records	
30	Himlay/Lumbay	Kyle Raphael	Pop	Viva Records	
30	Sad Girl Hours (Album)	Jayda Avanzado	Pop	Republic Records Philippines (UMG Philippines)	
30	All Or Nothing	Sam Mangubat	Pop	Dreamzone	
30	Hayaan	Chrstn	Pop	O/C Records	
30	Mali Ni Kupido	Carlos de Guia	Pop	Independent	
30	Through the Years	Juan Karlos	Country pop	Island Records Philippines (UMG Philippines)	
30	Buhay	Magiliw Street	Folk pop	The Cozy Cove	
30	Hahayaan	Autotelic	Alternative rock	Sony Music Philippines	
30	Buong Ako Sa'yo	Crakky, ALLMO$T	Hip hop/rap	Viva Records	
30	NLGA (woop)	Just Hush	Hip hop/rap	Viva Records	
30	Silent Cries	Josh Cullen	Hip hop/rap	Sony Music Philippines	
30	Life	Yuridope	Hip hop/rap	The Dope Music	
30	Medyo Crazy	Robledo Timido, Dyco, Cozyivy	Hip hop/rap	RealWrldStudios	
30	Ya Push	JRLDM (feat. Carm)	Hip hop/rap	Music Colony Records	
30	Sizza Baby	Kris Delano, Nateman	Hip hop/rap	Blanktapes	
30	Kanto Kalye Kidd (Album)	Nazty Kidd	Hip hop/rap	Independent	
30	Sandal	James Reid	R&B/soul	Careless Music; Sony Music Philippines	
30	This Day, We Offer To You	Himig Heswita	Contemporary; Christian	Jesuit Music Ministry	
30	FOMO	Eclypse	P-pop	GKD Labels	
30	Panggap	Plume	Ballad	AltG Records	
31	Paraya	December Avenue	Alternative	Tower of Doom Music	

==== September ====
Date	Single / album	Artist(s)	Genre(s)	Label(s)	Ref.
4	1999	Josh Cullen	Hip hop/rap	Sony Music Philippines	
4	Ngayong Gabi	Alamat, Nik Makino	Hip hop/rap	Viva Records	
4	Believe	Kyle Echarri, Illest Morena	R&B/soul	Coke Studio Philippines	
6	Apat Na Buwan (EP)	Janine	Pop	Vicor Music	
6	Walang Sigurado	Keanna Mag	Pop	Vicor Music	
6	Wish I Could	MYMP	Pop	PolyEast Records	
6	Naiilang	Jel Rey	Pop	Star Music	
6	All The Time	Paolo Sandejas	Pop	Sony Music Philippines	
6	Vacant	Claudia Barretto	Pop	Viva Records	
6	Unloving	Denin Sy	Pop	The Cozy Cove	
6	O Jo	Vilmark	Pop	GMA Music	
6	Sana Ako Na Lang	Poppert Bernadas	Pop	Gino Cruz Music	
6	Araw-Araw	Yamada	Pop	Independent	
6	Tongue Tied	Ysabelle	Pop	Independent	
6	I Hope You're Doing Well	Doughbaby, Lois, Rees Gonzales	Indie pop	Unstable Records	
6	What If I	Shantal Cyline	Indie pop	Unstable Records	
6	Wag Kang Ayaw	Grin Department	Punk rock	Independent	
6	Eksena	HNT	Indie rock	Independent	
6	Di Naman Lagi	Jom, ALLMO$T	Hip hop/rap	Viva Records	
6	Sadista	Lo Ki, Skusta Clee	Hip hop/rap	Viva Records	
6	Yours Truly	Kris Delano	Hip hop/rap	Blanktapes	
6	Palalo	Gloc-9	Hip hop/rap	Universal Records	
6	Filipina Killa'	Pieces.MN	Hip hop/rap	Baybayin Records	
6	Faded	Mobbstarr	Hip hop/rap	6G Music	
6	Beautiful	Where's the Sheep	Contemporary; Christian	Jesuit Music Ministry	
8	Tonight	Chocolate Factory, John Roa	Reggae	Numinous Philippines	
8	Dream Chaser	J$yTee, Mike Kosa	Hip hop/rap	MusicDenStudio	
9	KLWKN	Rocksteddy	Rock	Sony Music Philippines	
11	Day 1z	MaxyPresko	Hip hop/rap	Independent	
12	Hardest Part	Barb., Lazy McGuire	Indie pop	Independent	
13	Arrowmance	Rob Deniel	Pop	Vicor Music	
13	Paagara Ako	Shaira	Pop	AHS Productions	
13	KSPL	Shane G	Pop	Sony Music Philippines	
13	Ang Nag-iisa	Kai del Rio	Pop	Underdog Music PH	
13	Mata	Esang de Torres	Pop	PolyEast Records	
13	Dulo	Edwin Hurry Jr.	Pop	Universal Records	
13	Younger	Shell Tenedero	Pop	Cheerful Music	
13	Ulap (EP)	Eric Celerio	Pop	Star Music	
13	Caution (EP)	Seth Fedelin	Pop	StarPop	
13	Humaling	Fly Mama!	Alternative rock	Independent	
13	Pasensya, Patawad, Sorry	Happy Three Friends	Pop punk	Yellow Room Music; Sony Music Philippines	
13	Letter X	ALLMO$T	Hip hop/rap	Viva Records	
13	Ano Ka Gold	She-G, Teys	Hip hop/rap	Unstable Records	
13	Money	Raf Davis	Hip hop/rap	The Real Deal	
13	Hilo/Hibang	Yoki	Hip hop/rap	Independent	
13	Loose Ends	Angelo Rudy, Zeke Abella	Hip hop/rap	Independent	
13	Lambalak	MC Einstein, Kyla	R&B/soul	Halfway House	
13	Smoke	Kristina Dawn	R&B/soul	Downtown Q' Entertainment	
13	Kung Sa'yo	Lipip	R&B/soul	314 Studios	
13	Himno a Nuestra Señora de Peñafrancia (Resume Vibrante) (EP)	Various artists	Contemporary; Christian	Jesuit Music Ministry	
14	Multo	Cup of Joe	Pop rock	Viva Records	
14	Medyo Magaan (Album)	Omar Baliw	Hip hop/rap	Independent	
16	Kuwago	Ryannah J	R&B/soul	Rawstarr Records	
18	Morenita	Illest Morena	R&B/soul	Independent	
18	Sinungaling Ka Na Naman	St. Wolf	Alternative rock	Independent	
19	DM Me	Flict G, Bei Wenceslao, Joshua Mari	Hip hop/rap	Sony Music Philippines	
19	Langit Ang Gabi	Kingpilz, Ednil Beats	Hip hop/rap	Million Racks Records	
19	New Wave Surf	Lightskeen Baby	Hip hop/rap	Independent	
20	Closer to Your Heart	John Roa	Pop	Viva Records	
20	Aya	Earl Agustin	Pop	Vicor Music	
20	If I Will Ever Love Again	Geraldine Jennings	Pop	Star Music	
20	Dreams	Chlara	Pop	Evolution Media	
20	Wings	Lesha	Pop	Careless Music	
20	Say It Again	Armi Millare	Pop	DaWorks Entertainment	
20	Segundo	7th	Pop	O/C Records	
20	Sandali	Julian Sean	Pop	Temple Music	
20	Time Zones	Kat Jaranilla	Pop	The Cozy Cove	
20	Suyo	Dreycruz, Rees Gonzales	Indie pop	Unstable Records	
20	11ème (EP)	Muri	Indie pop	Warner Music Philippines	
20	Idlip (EP)	Sleep Alley	Alternative rock	Independent	
20	Dito Sa Elpi (EP)	Kuatro Kantos	Indie rock	Yellow Room Music; Sony Music Philippines	
20	Yo! Wassap!	Luci J, Guddhist Gunatita	Hip hop/rap	Lucidreams Music	
20	Kung Sa'kin Ka Lang	Alisson Shore	Hip hop/rap	Labyrinth Records	
20	Safe Ka Sa'kin	Playertwo	Hip hop/rap	Warner Music Philippines	
20	Na Na Na	Esseca	Hip hop/rap	314 Studios	
20	Kung Tayo'y Magkasama	Juan Caoile	R&B/soul	Viva Records	
20	Pulso	Ysanygo, L8ching	R&B/soul	Underdog Music PH	
20	Position	Tiana Kocher	R&B/soul	Manila Music	
20	Praise the Lord Forever	Himig Heswita	Contemporary; Christian	Jesuit Music Ministry	
23	Nasa Palad Mo	Ateneo Boys Choir	Contemporary; Christian	Jesuit Music Ministry	
23	Sunog	Fateeha, Morobeats	Hip hop/rap	Independent	
24	Lonta	Just Hush	Hip hop/rap	DRP Records	
24	Safe Zone	J emm Dahon, Saint Jhay	Hip hop/rap	GH Town Records	
25	Easier Said Than Done	August Wahh	Hip hop/rap	Careless Music	
26	Pasensyana	Kushin, King Lheanard	Hip hop/rap	GH Town Records	
27	Toyo	KZ Tandingan	Pop	Star Music	
27	Someday	Regine Velasquez	Pop	Star Music	
27	Heart Eyes	Stef Aranas	Pop	Offshore Music; Sony Music Philippines	
27	IAN V: Beyond Bulls#!t — Act 2	Ian Veneracion	Pop	Independent	
27	Olaholah (EP)	SunKissed Lola	Rock	Independent (Ditto Music)	
27	Yiee	Dilaw	Rock	Warner Music Philippines	
27	Paalam	The Agadiers	Rock	The Cozy Cove	
27	Rebound	The Juans	Pop rock	Viva Records	
27	Kakaiba	Paham	Indie rock	Off the Record; Sony Music Philippines	
27	Para	Andrej Agas	Country	Agas Music	
27	'Di Iniwanan	Shanti Dope	Hip hop/rap	Universal Records	
27	Sa'kin Ka	Supafly	Hip hop/rap	Greenhouse Records	
27	$he A 10	Teys	Hip hop/rap	unstable records	
27	Takbuhan	Kael Guerrero, Josh Cullen	Hip hop/rap	Isosceles Records	
27	Bomb	Lil Vincey	Hip hop/rap	Independent	
27	Tipsy	Kristina Dawn	R&B/soul	Downtown Q' Entertainment	
27	Walang Biruan	Kaia	P-pop	Sony Music Philippines	
27	Salmo ng Pangalan	Leandro Reyes, Andrej	Spoken word	MC'96 Records	
27	TABI	Tota	Indie pop	Off the Record; Sony Music Philippines	
28	II: The Second (Album)	Arthur Nery	Pop	Viva Records	
28	Kasama	Flow G, Chito Miranda	Hip hop/rap	Independent	
29	LaLuna	Skusta Clee, Yuridope, Ron Henley	Hip hop/rap	Panty Droppaz League	
30	Pasipsip Naman	Abaddon (feat. Tuglaks and Arville)	Hip hop/rap	Sony Music Philippines	

=== Fourth quarter ===
==== October ====
Date	Single / album	Artist(s)	Genre(s)	Label(s)	Ref.
1	Make Believe	Over October	Alternative rock	Underdog Music PH	
1	Never	Apl.de.ap, !llmind	Hip hop/rap	Independent	
1	Kainis	CLR	Hip hop/rap	Rawstarr Records	
2	Mr. Nice Guy	Kai Buizon	Pop	Sony Music Philippines	
3	Cherry On Top (BiniMo Remix)	Bini, Agnez Mo	Pop	Star Music	
3	Kailangan	Raven	Pop	Independent	
3	Probinsyana	Nateman, Robledo Timido, Kiddotin	Hip hop/rap	HTRB Records	
4	Wag Lang Ganun	Matthaios, Jiji	Pop	Offended by Passion	
4	Favorite Song	Jason Dhakal, Denȳ	Pop	Warner Music Philippines	
4	Jeep	Rhodessa	Pop	Viva Records	
4	'Di Na Babalik Sa'yo	Shane Dandan	Pop	Viva Records	
4	'Di Naman	Dwta	Pop	Sony Music Philippines	
4	Tao Rin Ako	Angelo Garcia	Pop	Vicor Music	
4	Pakiusap	Jay Abordo	Indie pop	Mabuhay Music Group	
4	Happy Sad	Barbie Almalbis	Alternative rock	Independent	
4	Obsessed With Me	Prettyboy Russel, Allmo$t	Hip hop/rap	Viva Records	
4	'Di Madali	Guddhist Gunatita, Ghetto Gecko	Hip hop/rap	1096 Gang	
4	Pasitib	Cookie$	Hip hop/rap	The Bakeshop Studios	
4	Dito Safe Ka	Teys, Dreycruz	Hip hop/rap	Unstable Records	
4	Sa Gitna Ng Ulan	Smugglaz, Curse One, Vlync	Hip hop/rap	Independent	
4	Naiya	Calvin de Leon	Hip hop/rap	Independent	
4	Right 4 Me	Mcrel, Zeke Abella	Hip hop/rap	Independent	
4	Ikaw Laging Tama	Joshua Mari	Hip hop/rap	Independent	
4	Glory to God	Himig Heswita	Contemporary; Christian	Jesuit Music Ministry	
5	Pinas	J-King	Hip hop/rap	Wild Kings	
5	Handa Ka Ba	Samsara	Hip hop/rap	Independent	
8	Babytawan	Benedict Cua	Pop	PolyEast Records	
9	Oops! I Did It Again	Zae	Hip hop/rap	Rawstarr Records	
10	Wag Mag-alala	Hey Its Je	Pop	Independent	
10	Be Happy	Timmy Cruz	Pop	Sound Manila Records	
10	Neptunes (Album)	Pinkmen	Alternative rock	Sony Music Philippines	
10	Light of the World (EP)	Feast Worship	Contemporary Christian	Feast Music and Resources	
11	BB	Kyle Raphael	Pop	Viva Records	
11	Pansinin Mo Naman Ako	Angela Ken	Pop	Star Music	
11	Virgo	Nica del Rosario	Pop	FlipMusic	
11	Being and Becoming (Album)	Acel Bisa	Pop	Sony Music Philippines	
11	You, Me, and Us	Crystal Paras	Pop	GMA Playlist	
11	Back 2 U	Liyenne	Pop	Independent	
11	Hirap Kalimutan	Jan Roberts	Indie pop	Warner Music Philippines	
11	Kung Nandito Ka Lang Sana	Halina	Indie pop	Halina Recordings	
11	Higa	Lily	Rock	UMG Philippines	
11	The Risk	Faspitch	Rock	Tower of Doom Music	
11	Magik	Banda Ni Kleggy	Pop rock	Warner Music Philippines	
11	Bawat Hakbang	Divino Rivera	Indie folk	Independent	
11	Minerva	Gloc-9	Hip hop/rap	Universal Records	
11	Underrated	Ramdiss	Hip hop/rap	Universal Records	
11	Dulo	Kylu, Yamada, Vaughn	Hip hop/rap	Ivory Music and Video	
11	Holding It Down	Dice & K9, Hi-C, Garvie	Hip hop/rap	6G Music Inc.	
11	Forget You	Kat DJ	Club/EDM	Thrace Music	
13	Dyosa	Manila Luzon	LGBT	Republic Records Philippines (UMG Philippines)	
16	Kdrama	Shanni	Indie pop	Sony Music Philippines	
17	Hindi Kita Kayang Dalhin Sa Buwan	Mai Cantillano, Andrej	Spoken word	MC'96 Records	
17	Tagpi-Tagping Piraso	Ely Buendia	Pop	Offshore Music; Sony Music Philippines	
18	Oyayi	Alisson Shore, Arthur Nery, Keane Leonor	Pop	Labyrinth Records	
18	Jeczerius: Happy Memories (Album)	Jeczerius	Pop	Star Music	
18	Kulimlim	Angela Ken	Pop	Tarsier Records	
18	Just A Song	Paolo Sandejas	Pop	Sony Music Philippines	
18	Pagsamo	Jona	Pop	Viva Records	
18	GG	Joema Lauriano	Pop	Viva Records	
18	Leaves	Martin Nievera	Pop	Vicor Music	
18	Huling Araw	Fred Engay	Pop	Orieland	
18	Handa Na	Noah Raquel	Pop	Osterio Limited	
18	Basta Ba Kasama Kita	Pipah Pancho	Pop	Ivory Music and Video	
18	Darating Din	TJ Monterde	Pop	Independent	
18	Triumph	Ben&Ben	Alternative folk	Sony Music Philippines	
18	Tabing Dagat	Any Name's Okay	Alternative pop	Sony Music Philippines	
18	Kung Sino Tamaan (EP)	Agsunta	Alternative rock	CS Music	
18	Sa Huli	Kjwan	Rock	Independent	
18	Mirasol	James Reid	R&B/soul	Careless Music; Sony Music Philippines	
18	Meta Mixtape (EP)	Nik Makino, Shao Lin	Hip hop/rap	Diamond Talentz	
18	Kalidad	Midnasty	Hip hop/rap	Warner Music Philippines	
18	Hiling sa Bituin	Krisostomo	Hip hop/rap	Viva Records	
18	Iba-iba Ang Gusto Mo	Lil Vinceyy	Hip hop/rap	Independent	
18	Mama	Gra The Great	Hip hop/rap	Independent	
18	The Angels of The Lord	Ateneo Boys Choir	Contemporary; Christian	Jesuit Music Ministry	
20	Light Up, Shine	Belle Mariano	Pop	Star Music	
20	Oh, Baby!	TVJ Singing Queens	Pop	Sunshine Records	
22	MT	Karylle	Pop	Independent	
23	Di Ka Na Nakakatuwa	EJ del Perio	Pop	Sony Music Philippines	
23	Iced Coffee	Pix!e	P-pop	Viva Records	
24	When This Is Over	Elise Huang, barb	Pop	Underdog Music PH	
25	Nobya	Adie	Pop	O/C Records	
25	Buttons	Lyn Lapid	Pop	Republic Records Philippines (UMG Philippines)	
25	Nakakabulag	Jed Baruelo	Pop	Sony Music Philippines	
25	Hangin	Paul Pablo	Pop	Warner Music Philippines	
25	Kung Iyo Mamarapatin (Album)	Shane Dandan	Pop	Viva Records	
25	Foolish Heart	Nina (feat. Hindley Street Country Club)	Pop	Independent	
25	Sana Ay Malaman Mo	Daryl Ong	Pop	Independent	
25	Lost	Written by the Stars	Rock	Warner Music Philippines	
25	Homesick (Album)	Dave Lamar	Alternative	Underdog Music PH	
25	Pipiliin	Coeli	Alternative folk	Underdog Music PH	
25	Itinagong Lihim	Bandang Lapis	Alternative pop	Viva Records	
25	Fyp Luv	Allmo$t	Hip hop/rap	Viva Records	
25	YSA (Year of Issa)	Lo Ki	Hip hop/rap	Viva Records	
25	Sex Tape	Shanti Dope	Hip hop/rap	Universal Records	
25	Singungaling	Kiddotin, Robledo Timido	Hip hop/rap	RealWrldStudios	
25	Good Girl	Young Blood Neet	Hip hop/rap	GhostWorldWide	
25	Feel My	JRLDM	Hip hop/rap	Music Colony Records	
25	Dreams	Raf Davis	Hip hop/rap	The Real Deal	
25	AkoNaSana	Fern.	Hip hop/rap	Island Records Philippines (UMG Philippines)	
25	KB	Gloc-9, Karl Banayad	Hip hop/rap	Independent	
25	Ye Yo	Jeff Grecia	Hip hop/rap	Independent	
25	Galing Lansangan	Ghetto Gecko	Hip hop/rap	Independent	
25	Better Than He Does	Denise Julia	R&B/soul	Sony Music Philippines	
25	Aba Ginoong Maria	Ateneo Boys Choir	Gospel	Jesuit Music Ministry	
26	TMD	Nateman	Hip hop/rap	HTRB Records	
26	One God (Album)	Exalt Worship	Contemporary Christian	Exalt Worship	
29	A Life of a Bai (Album)	Cookie$	Hip hop/rap	Bakeshop Studios	
30	Huwag Mo 'Kong Iwanan	Similar Sky, David La Sol	Pop rock	The Cozy Cove	
30	Panata	Tothapi	Alternative	Sony Music Philippines	
30	Liv, Luvv, Cocoa (Album)	Young Cocoa	Hip hop/rap	Offmute Music	
31	San Ka Na	Moira Dela Torre	Pop	Republic Records Philippines (UMG Philippines)	
31	Balatkayo	Vanessa Mendoza	Pop	Warner Music Philippines	
31	My Unsent Love Letter	Aira	Pop, R&B/soul	Tiny Home Records	
31	Sa May Kabilang Dulo (Album)	Totâ	Alternative	Off the Record; Sony Music Philippines	
31	Sana Tayo Ulit	Still One, Joshua Mari	Hip hop/rap	Independent	
31	God is Good	Victory Alabang Worship	Christian	Independent	

==== November ====
Date	Single / album	Artist(s)	Genre(s)	Label(s)	Ref.
1	Sounding Joy — The Holiday Album	Lea Salonga	Pop	Center Stage Records	
1	Nandito Ako (Reimagined)	Ogie Alcasid	Pop	PolyEast Records	
1	Suntok Sa Buwan	Paolo Santos	Pop	Evolution Media	
1	Versus	Gra the Great	Hip hop/rap	Great Records	
1	Pag-asa	Guddhist Gunatita, Loir	Hip hop/rap	Independent	
1	Blues Clues	Ayip	R&B/soul	Baybayin Records	
1	Eyes On You	Gabby Parafina	R&B/soul	Independent	
2	Bebot Na Makulit	SwKeith	Hip hop/rap	404 Records	
5	Kung Napapagod Ka Na	Still One, Joshua Mari, Cy Silva, Cauley	Hip hop/rap	Independent	
6	Ligaw Na Bullet	Denise Laurel, Skusta Clee	R&B/soul	Independent	
7	Aji (Ang Sarap)	Stef Aranas	Pop	Offshore Music; Sony Music Philippines	
7	When The Day Ends	Leah Halili	Pop	Independent	
7	Kamukha	Blaster Silonga	Alternative pop	Island Records Philippines (UMG Philippines)	
7	Babyboy Mixtape 3 (EP)	Lightskeen Baby	Hip hop/rap	Independent	
8	Marilag	Dionela	Pop	EMI Records (UMG Philippines)	
8	Kiss (EP)	Rhodessa	Pop	Viva Records	
8	Pasulyap-sulyap	Alex Gonzaga	Pop	O/C Records	
8	Binibestfriend	Eugene Layug	Pop	O/C Records	
8	Lagi Na Lang	Sugarcane	Pop	Warner Music Philippines	
8	Madama	BJ Esporma	Pop	Warner Music Philippines	
8	Whenever You Are	Regine Velasquez	Pop	Star Music	
8	Coffee Me	Doughbaby, Peej, Rees Gonzales	Pop	Unstable Records	
8	Can't Stop Loving You	Shell Tenedero	Pop	Cheerful Music	
8	Ganda-gandahan	Dia Maté	Pop	Independent	
8	Kanta Ng Pasko	Nef Medina	Christmas pop	Evolution Media	
8	Method Adaptor (Album)	Ely Buendia	Pop rock	Offshore Music; Sony Music Philippines	
8	Pagitan	Paham	Indie rock	Off the Record; Sony Music Philippines	
8	Sunog	Gloc-9	Hip hop/rap	Universal Records	
8	Whiteboy T (Album)	Matteyo	Hip hop/rap	Greenhouse Records	
8	Snitch	Gra the Great	Hip hop/rap	Great Records	
8	Para Sa	K-Leb	Hip hop/rap	Independent	
8	Inamorata (EP)	Hero, Arvy T	Hip hop/rap	Independent	
8	Sweet Nothings: Chapter 2 (EP)	Denise Julia	R&B/soul	Sony Music Philippines	
8	Get Lost	Kristina Dawn	R&B/soul	Downtown Q' Entertainment	
8	Kasama Natin Ang Panginoon	gloryfall	Contemporary Christian	Waterwalk Records	
9	Sa Pasko Sasapit Din	Bukas Palad Music Ministry	Christmas	Jesuit Music Ministry	
10	Hari	Orient Pearl	Rock	BlkshpMNL	
10	It Lies Within (Filipino Version)	G22	P-Pop	Asia Pacific Predator League	
11	Ayos Lang	Kxle	Hip hop/rap	Off+Human	
13	Rewritten Promise (Volume 2) (Album)	Jason Marvin	Pop	Sony Music Philippines	
13	Time's Up	Michael Pacquiao	Hip hop/rap	Oblivion Paradise	
14	Joy to the World	Bini	Christmas	Star Music	
15	Pamamaalam	Janine Berdin	Pop	Island Records Philippines (UMG Philippines)	
15	Pagbilang ng Tatlo	Eliza Maturan	Pop	Unstable Entertainment	
15	Makahiya	Chrstn	Pop	O/C Records	
15	Miss Worldwide (Album)	Stef Aranas	Pop	Offshore Music; Sony Music Philippines	
15	Senyales	Jao	Pop	PolyEast Records	
15	Uma	Sassa Gurl	Pop	Independent	
15	Hiding in the Bathroom	Clara Benin	Indie pop	Sony Music Philippines	
15	Free Love (Album)	John Roa	Pop, R&B	Viva Records	
15	Kelly (Scorpio)	Sponge Cola	Rock	Sony Music Philippines	
15	Tama Ka Na	The Juans	Pop rock	Viva Records	
15	Calein (EP)	Calein	Indie rock	Independent	
15	Sickreet	Ryannah J	R&B/soul	O/C Records	
15	LIF3/Ikaw Ang Buhay Ko	Juan Caoile	R&B/soul	Viva Records	
15	Weather With You	Lucas Pison, Chezka	R&B/soul	Underdog Music PH	
15	I'm Good	Darla Baltazar	R&B/soul	Wings Music Group	
15	Miles Away	Zeke Abella	Hip hop/rap	Independent	
15	Type Shi	Gra the Great	Hip hop/rap	Independent	
15	Ating Pasko	SB19, G22	Christmas	Acer Philippines	
15	Karoling	Nica del Rosario, Angelika Sam, Penelope	Christmas	FlipMusic Records	
15	Tulipan	Press Hit Play	P-pop	Sony Music Philippines	
15	Panagutin	Andrej Agas	Folk	Independent	
16	Bungad (Spoken Word Collection) (Album)	Mai Cantillano	Folk	MC'96 Records	
17	Praning	Abaddon (feat. Curse One)	Hip hop/rap	Sony Music Philippines	
17	Sa'yo	La Mave	Hip hop/rap	NPS Music	
18	Bounce (EP)	Kritiko	Hip hop/rap	Blvck Music	
19	The Love (Album)	Gigi de Lana	Pop	Radja Atlantis	
20	Re: Thinkin' About You	H1-Key, Josh Cullen	Pop	GLG	
20	Hiraya	Alamat	P-pop	Viva Records	
20	Sol Speak	August Wahh	Hip hop/rap	Careless Music	
21	Bighani	Ace Banzuelo	Pop	Sony Music Philippines	
22	I'm Okay (Album)	Moira Dela Torre	Pop	Republic Records Philippines (UMG Philippines)	
22	Happy Ending	Rob Deniel	Pop	Vicor Music	
22	Reginified (Album)	Regine Velasquez	Pop	Star Music	
22	Damdamin!	Syd Hartha	Pop	Sony Music Philippines	
22	Anong Daratnan — Tagalog Single Version	Belle Mariano	Pop	Walt Disney Records	
22	Balik	Dom Guyot, Adie	Pop	Radical Music	
22	Only One In Love	Better Days	Alternative	Universal Records	
22	M.I.N.O.Y	Mrld	Alternative pop	O/C Records	
22	Panatag	Hale, Barbie Almalbis	Pop rock	EMI Records (UMG Philippines)	
22	I Dior U	Shanti Dope	Hip hop/rap	Universal Records	
22	Hintay	Nik Makino, Shao Lin, TreyLow Baby	Hip hop/rap	Diamond Management	
22	iPhone X	King Promdi	Hip hop/rap	Toxic Lifestyle	
22	Who You?	Smugglaz	Hip hop/rap	Independent	
22	Mala Wu-Tang	1096 Gang	Hip hop/rap	Independent	
22	Noche Buena	Jan Roberts	Christmas	Warner Music Philippines	
22	Our Father	Himig Heswita	Contemporary; Christian	Jesuit Music Ministry	
22	Onward, Pilgrims of Hope	Bukas Palad Music Ministry	Contemporary; Christian	Jesuit Music Ministry	
22	Alay sa Gabay	Jerms	Contemporary R&B	Independent	
22	Lose Control	Kat DJ	Club/EDM	Thrace Music	
23	Up	Omar Baliw	Hip hop/rap	Independent	
26	Saya	Bianca Lipana	Indie pop	Sony Music Philippines	
27	Closure	Jr Crown (feat. Kath)	Hip hop/rap	Sony Music Philippines	
27	Ysanygo Worldwide Vol. 1 (EP)	Ysanygo	R&B/soul	Underdog Music PH	
27	Malinaw	Carousel Casualties	Alternative rock	Offshore Music; Sony Music Philippines	
29	JGH (Album)	James Reid	Pop	Careless Music	
29	Pangalan	Jikamarie	Pop	Warner Music Philippines	
29	Lapit Sa Akin	Mona Gonzales	Pop	Sony Music Philippines	
29	More of You	RJ Jimenez, Ellie Jimenez	Pop	Spot Talent; Studio MNL	
29	Sana Ikaw Ay Masaya (Album)	Noah Raquel	Pop	Ostereo Limited	
29	Tangi	Carl Beley	Pop	Unstable Entertainment	
29	'Di Na Pwede	Jeniffer Maravilla	Pop	GMA Playlist	
29	Hanap	Kiyo	Pop	Independent	
29	Saysay ng Buhay	Hey Its Je	Pop	Independent	
29	Just Once	Mark Carpio (feat. Hindley Street Country Club)	Pop	Independent	
29	Befriending My Tears (And Then Some) (Album)	Clara Benin	Indie pop	Offmute Music	
29	Maki-Pasko	The Dawn	Rock	Sony Music Philippines	
29	Sumayaw Tayo	The Agadiers	Rock	The Cozy Cove	
29	The Traveller Across Dimensions (Album)	Ben&Ben	Alternative folk	Sony Music Philippines	
29	Lola Amour: The Album Concert (Album)	Lola Amour	Alternative rock	Warner Music Philippines	
29	Afteryou (Album)	I Belong to the Zoo	Alternative rock	Independent	
29	Gusto Ko Lang Mag-isa	Sud	Jazz	Yellow Room Music; Sony Music Philippines	
29	IDK	JRLDM	Hip hop/rap	Warner Music Philippines	
29	Sangtawag	Nik Makino, Shao Lin, TreyLow Baby	Hip hop/rap	Diamond Talentz	
29	Binabaliw	Zo zo	Hip hop/rap	Viva Records	
29	Drug Luv	J emm Dahon	Hip hop/rap	Viva Records	
29	Thick Thighs	Teys	Hip hop/rap	Unstable Entertainment	
29	Lady in Red (Cover)	Kris Lawrence	R&B/soul	Homeworkz Entertainment Services	
29	Jesus Best Friend	Ateneo Boys Choir	Contemporary; Christian	Jesuit Music Ministry	

==== December ====
Date	Single / album	Artist(s)	Genre(s)	Label(s)	Ref.
1	Bughaw	Maki	Pop	Tarsier Records	
1	Kinang	Trisha Macapagal	Pop	The Cozy Cove	
2	W.K.M.M. ('Wag Kang Mag-alala, Mama)	Outcast (feat. Ai-ai delas Alas)	Hip hop/rap	Independent	
4	Kailangan Bitawan Kita	Joshua Mari	Hip hop/rap	Independent	
5	Andito Lang	BGYO	P-pop	Star Music	
6	Kailan	Jason Dhakal	R&B/soul	Warner Music Philippines	
6	Luntiang Mundo	Mona Gonzales	Pop	Sony Music Philippines	
6	Falling in Love	Darren Cashwell	Pop	Star Music	
6	Tumatakbo	Off to Neverland	Pop	Independent	
6	Gtara	UDD, Just Hush	Indie pop	Viva Records	
6	Sa Bawat Sandali	Amiel Sol	Indie pop	Ivory Music and Video	
6	Hiling Ngayong Pasko	Clubs	Indie rock	Warner Music Philippines	
6	Makikiramdam	Paham (feat. bbgriri)	Indie rock	Off the Record; Sony Music Philippines	
6	Puting Papel	Gloc-9, Kael Guerrero, Yuridope	Hip hop/rap	Universal Records	
6	A to Z	Alex Bruce, Zae	Hip hop/rap	Sony Music Philippines	
6	Sa'kin Babalik	Ron David, $NPRD	Hip hop/rap	RealWrldStudios	
6	Isipin	JMara, Gmac of Morobeats, DJ Medmessiah	Hip hop/rap	Twenty Twenty Four	
6	Bat Kaba Ganyan	Unotheone, Flyboi	Hip hop/rap	Independent	
6	Moon	Gra The Great	Hip hop/rap	Independent	
6	Isang Buong Araw Kasama Ka (Flipped version)	Akong Ayalam	Alternative folk	FlipMusic Records	
6	Our Stories Shine This Christmas	Various artists	Christmas	Star Music	
6	Ikaw Ang Kukumpleto Ng Pasko	Maymay Entrata	Christmas	Star Music	
6	Wala Nang Iba	1st.One	P-pop	Warner Music Philippines	
6	Kuyog Lang Ta	Hometown Kids, Oh! Caraga	Visayan	O/C Music	
8	Ponme Con Tu Hijo	Himig Heswita	Gospel	Jesuit Music Ministry	
11	Plain Girl	Jolianne	Pop	Sony Music Philippines	
11	Run	Greyhoundz	Metal	Tower of Doom Music	
11	Pagkasabik	JP Bacallan, Rhyne	Hip hop/rap	Rawstarr Records; Sony Music Philippines	
12	Sa Atin Siya' Mamamalagi (Album)	Ateneo Boys Choir	Contemporary; Christian	Jesuit Music Ministry	
12	Eyynuman	Rocksteddy	Rock	Sony Music Philippines	
13	Girl, You're On My Mind	Ace Banzuelo	Pop	Sony Music Philippines	
13	Hell Week (EP)	Jed Baruelo	Pop	Sony Music Philippines	
13	Love, Mona (EP)	Mona Gonzales	Pop	Sony Music Philippines	
13	Everybody Wants To Rule The World	Hey June!	Pop rock	Island Records Philippines (UMG Philippines)	
13	Aking Diwata	Noel Cabangon	Folk	Widescope Entertainment	
13	Sibak	Giniling Festival	Rock	Terno Recordings	
13	Sapatos Ko	Realest Cram	Hip hop/rap	GhostWorldWide	
13	Topakk	Bassilyo	Hip hop/rap	Star Music	
13	Smoke Tayo Girl	Nateman	Hip hop/rap	HTRB Records	
13	2001 Civic	Kris Delano	Hip hop/rap	Blanktapes	
13	Kahit Ngayon Lang	Kael Guerrero	Hip hop/rap	Isosceles Records	
13	Mga Tambay	Pio Balbuena	Hip hop/rap	Independent	
13	Dumating	Sawndass Music	Hip hop/rap	Independent	
13	Sa'yo Pa Rin Uuwi	Alamat	P-pop	Viva Records; Ninuno Media	
13	Amin Amin	6ense	P-pop	Sony Music Philippines	
13	Paskong Kapiling Ka	Jana Garcia	Christmas	Universal Records	
13	Disyembre	Zo zo	Christmas	Independent	
13	Kontrol	Kat DJ	Club/EDM	Thrace Music	
14	Wanhanidbandz	Gins&Melodies	Hip hop/rap	Independent	
15	Ano Na Bhe?	Abaddon	Hip hop/rap	Sony Music Philippines	
15	Manigong Bagong Taon	Carlos Agassi	Hip hop/rap	Independent	
16	JESUS. (Live from Victory Conference) (Album)	Victory Worship, AWAKE84	Praise and Worship	Victory	
17	Abante	Bassilyo, Jayson Andrade, Axcel	Hip hop/rap	Independent	
17	Kupido Natin Manhid	Kristina Dawn	R&B/soul	Downtown Q' Entertainment	
18	Ako Na Lang	Dream Seven	Alternative	The Cozy Cove	
18	Winna Winna	Pagina Heels, Moophs	Drag	Tarsier Records	
18	Last Christmas	Bugoy Drilon	Christmas	Independent	
20	Magbalik	No Lore	Alternative pop	Off the Record; Sony Music Philippines	
20	Huling Liham	Paham, Dwta	Indie rock	Off the Record; Sony Music Philippines	
20	Airplane Mode	Kurt Ulysses	Hip hop/rap	Baybayin Records	
21	Shake	O Side Mafia, Brgr	Hip hop/rap	Sony Music Philippines	
21	Liwanag	Sly Kane, JKris	Hip hop/rap	Iron Chef Recording Studio	
21	Huling Tagay ng Taon	Smugglaz	Hip hop/rap	Independent	
25	Magkabilaan (from The Kingdom)	Zephanie Dimaranan feat. Apoc	Folk	CS Music	
26	Totoo Ako Sa'yo	Nateman	Hip hop/rap	HTRB Records	
26	Gang Ko	OLG Zak	Hip hop/rap	GhostWorldWide	
27	Iiyak Lang Na	Morissette	Pop	Underdog Music PH	
27	Manila to LA	Paolo Sandejas	Pop	Sony Music Philippines	
27	Ganon Lang Ba Kadali?	Jen Cee	Pop	TMP Productions	
27	Lahat	Hey Its Je	Pop	Independent	
27	Maharot	Allmo$t	Hip hop/rap	Viva Records	
27	Fool 4 Ya	King Promdi	Hip hop/rap	Toxic Lifestyle Entertainment	
27	My Day	Hellmerry	Hip hop/rap	Independent	
27	Take Me to Cubao	Jose at Melodiya	Hip hop/rap	Independent	
30	Kiss Us	Nix Damn P, Tioncy	House; Club/EDM	Independent	

== Notable shows ==
=== Local artists ===
Date(s)	Headliner(s)	Venue	City	Event / Tour	Note(s)	Ref(s)
January 12	Philippine Philharmonic Orchestra	Metropolitan Theater	Manila	Fate: Featuring the works of Brahms and Tchaikovsky	—N/a	
January 19	Klarisse de Guzman, Nyoy Volante	The Bellevue Manila	Muntinlupa	Star Magic Music Room Presents	—N/a	
January 31	Manila Symphony Orchestra	Carlos P. Romulo Auditorium, RCBC Plaza	Makati	The Manila Symphony Orchestra 98th Anniversary Concert: Featuring the works of Peña, Nielsen and Tchaikovsky	—N/a	
January 31	Anthony Rosaldo	Music Museum	San Juan	Switch	—N/a	
February 3	Ebe Dancel	123 Block, Mandala Park	Mandaluyong	Dramachine... 20 Years Later	With special participation of Mitch Singson. Originally scheduled on January 26 but was rescheduled to Dancel's health condition.	
February 9	Philippine Philharmonic Orchestra	Samsung Performing Arts Theater, Circuit Makati	Makati	Switch Concert VI: Featuring the works of Beethoven and Brahms	Conducted by Grzegorz Nowak	
February 9	Nina	Waterfront Hotel & Casino	Cebu	Only Nina	—N/a	
February 9–10	Pops Fernandez	The Theatre, Solaire Resort & Casino	Parañaque	Always Loved	—N/a	
February 9–10	Cup of Joe	New Frontier Theater	Quezon	Seatbelts On!	—N/a	
February 10	Side A	Newport Performing Arts Theater	Pasay	Live and Love	—N/a	
February 10	Michael de Mesa, Arman Ferrer, Audie Gemora, Franco Laurel, Jett Pangan, Michael Williams	Music Museum	San Juan	Mr. Streisand	—N/a	
February 13	Adie, Alamat, Mrld, Arthur Nery, Rhodessa, Rob Deniel, Janine Teñoso	Araneta Coliseum	Quezon	ILYSM: A Valentine's Harana Concert	—N/a	
February 14	The Company	Music Museum	San Juan	The CompanY in "Beautiful Day"	—N/a	
February 14	Hajji Alejandro, Nanette Inventor, Marco Sison, Mitch Valdes, Nonoy Zuñiga	The Theatre, Solaire Resort & Casino	Parañaque	Our Time	—N/a	
February 14–15	Ogie Alcasid, Odette Quesada	Newport Performing Arts Theater	Pasay	Love, Q & A	—N/a	
February 16	Boboy Garovillo, Jim Paredes, Jamie Rivera, Rey Valera	Newport Performing Arts Theater	Pasay	Your Songs: A Journey Through Time	—N/a	
February 16–25	Alice Reyes Dance Philippines	Samsung Performing Arts Theater, Circuit Makati	Makati	Rama, Hari	—N/a	
February 17	Rivermaya	SMDC Festival Grounds, Aseana City	Parañaque	Rivermaya: The Reunion	—N/a	
February 19	Bamboo, Sarah Geronimo	Manuel Y. Torres Sports Center	Bago	Sarah G x Bamboo in Negros	—N/a	
February 21	Chad Borja, Anthony Castelo, Mon Espia, Monet Gaskel, Rey Magtoto, Leah Navarro, Gino Padilla, Jun Polistico, Rannie Raymundo, Richard Reynoso, Male Rigor, Sampaguita, Nonoy Tan, Renz Verano	The Theatre, Solaire Resort & Casino	Parañaque	OPM Stars	—N/a	
February 23	Noel Cabangon, Joey Generoso, Ice Seguerra	Newport Performing Arts Theater	Pasay	Strings and Voices: A Threelogy Series	—N/a	
February 24	Aegis	Newport Performing Arts Theater	Pasay	Aegis: Unbreakable	—N/a	
February 24–25	Lisa Macuja-Elizalde	Aliw Theater	Pasay	Lisa Macuja-Elizalde's Le Corsaire	—N/a	
February 27	6cyclemind, Autotelic, Ica Frias, Gracenote, Josh Cullen, Nik Makino, No Lore, SunKissed Lola, Toneejay	New Frontier Theater	Quezon	Fenix360 Philippines Live	—N/a	
February 29	Hazel Faith	Music Museum	San Juan	Hazel Faith: Kilig Pa More	With special guest, Jose Mari Chan, and Caleb Santos	
March 1–24	Tanghalang Pilipino	Tanghalang Ignacio B. Gimenez, CCP Complex	Pasay	Pingkian: Isang Musikal	—N/a	
March 2	Julie Anne San Jose, Erik Santos	Newport Performing Arts Theater	Pasay	Love Bound	—N/a	
March 8	Gabby Concepcion, Christopher de Leon, Ai-Ai delas Alas	Newport Performing Arts Theater	Pasay	Two Kings and Ai	—N/a	
March 8	Philippine Philharmonic Orchestra	Samsung Performing Arts Theater, Circuit Makati	Makati	Switch Concert VII: Don Pasquale	Conducted by Grzegorz Nowak	
March 8	Dulce	Music Museum	San Juan	Dulce... Solid!	—N/a	
March 8–10	Ballet Philippines	The Theatre, Solaire Resort & Casino	Parañaque	Limang Daan	—N/a	
March 9	Garth Garcia	Music Museum	San Juan	Back Home	—N/a	
March 15–17	Philippine Madrigal Singers	Samsung Performing Arts Theater, Circuit Makati	Makati	Sisenti	—N/a	
March 16	Kuh Ledesma	Music Museum	San Juan	3:16: Kuh Ledesma Birthday Concert	—N/a	
March 20	Bituin Escalante	Samsung Performing Arts Theater, Circuit Makati	Makati	Virtuosa, Bituin	—N/a	
March 22	Manila Symphony Orchestra	Carlos P. Romulo Auditorium, RCBC Plaza	Makati	Concerto Ottimo	Conducted by Marlon Chen	
April 6	KAIA	Music Museum	San Juan	KAIAVERSITY: KAIA 2nd Anniversary Fan Concert	—N/a	
April 12	Zack Tabudlo	Mall of Asia Arena	Pasay	Zack Tabudlo Live	—N/a	
April 12	Randy Santiago	Plenary Hall – Philippine International Convention Center	Pasay	Eyecon	With special guest, Nina, Gino Padilla, Rachel Alejandro and Juan Miguel Salvador	
April 12–June 30	Various	PETA Theater	Quezon	One More Chance: The Musical featuring the songs of Ben&Ben	—N/a	
April 13	Neocolours	Music Museum	San Juan	Tuloy Pa Rin Ang Awit Ng OPM	—N/a	
April 13	Khimo Gumatay, Sam Mangubat, Reiven Umali, Katrina Velarde, JM Yosures	Samsung Performing Arts Theater, Circuit Makati	Makati	ZCON: The Gen Z Icons Concert	—N/a	
April 19	Philippine Philharmonic Orchestra	Samsung Performing Arts Theater, Circuit Makati	Makati	Switch Concert VIII: Fete Francaise	Conducted by Grzegorz Nowak	
April 19	Regine Velasquez	Mall of Asia Arena	Pasay	Regine Rocks: The Repeat	—N/a	
April 19	Streetboys, Universal Motion Dancers	Aliw Theater	Pasay	The Sign: ‘90s Supershow	—N/a	
April 20	Gabe Bondoc, Jeremy Pasion	Music Museum	San Juan	Parallels	—N/a	
April 21	Hajji Alejandro, Rachel Alejandro, Kris Lawrence, Gino Padilla, Geoff Taylor	New Frontier Theater	Quezon	Awit ng Panahon Noon at Ngayon	—N/a	
April 21	Ballet Manila	Aliw Theater	Pasay	Ibong Adarna	—N/a	
April 23	Yeng Constantino	Centerplay, City of Dreams	Parañaque	Yeng Constantino Live!	Part of the Centerplay Concert Series	
April 25–28	Various	Samsung Performing Arts Theater, Circuit Makati	Makati	International Dance Day Festival	—N/a	
April 26–27	Gary Valenciano	Mall of Asia Arena	Pasay	Pure Energy: One Last Time	—N/a	
April 26–June 8	Various	Newport Performing Arts Theater	Pasay	Buruguduystunstugudunstuy: The Musical	—N/a	
April 27	JM dela Cerna, Lyka Estrella, Khimo Gumatay, Marielle Montellano, Reiven Umali, Rea Gen Villareal, JM Yosures	Music Museum	San Juan	New Gen Champs	—N/a	
April 27	Arthur Miguel, Banda ni Kleggy, Lou Bonnevie, Gracenote, Paraluman, This Band, Nyoy Volante	SM City Novaliches	Quezon	Earth Day Jam 2024	—N/a	
April 28	Hev Abi	New Frontier Theater	Quezon	Morato Most Wanted	—N/a	
April 29	Various	19 East	Muntinlupa	Manila A Homecoming Concert	—N/a	
April 29	Bituin Escalante	Samsung Performing Arts Theater, Circuit Makati	Makati	The Great White Way	Part of the JZA Concert Series.	
May 3	UP Symphony Orchestra	Samsung Performing Arts Theater, Circuit Makati	Makati	Beyond Time and Space	—N/a	
May 4	Manila Symphony Orchestra	Samsung Performing Arts Theater, Circuit Makati	Makati	Mäkilä In Manila: Sibelius No. 3 and Dvořák Cello Concerto	Conducted by Sasha Mäkilä, featuring Damodar das Castillo	
May 5–6	TJ Monterde	New Frontier Theater	Quezon	Sariling Mundo	—N/a	
May 10	Ice Seguerra	Music Museum	San Juan	Ice Seguerra Videoke Hits	—N/a	
May 10	Gary Valenciano	Mall of Asia Arena	Pasay	Pure Energy: One Last Time	—N/a	
May 11–12	Ryan Cayabyab	Samsung Performing Arts Theater, Circuit Makati	Makati	Gen C	—N/a	
May 11, 12 and 18	Ballet Manila	Aliw Theater	Pasay	Tatlong Kuwento Ni Lola Basyang	—N/a	
May 18–19	SB19	Araneta Coliseum	Quezon	Pagtatag! World Tour: Finale	With special guests, Apl.de.ap, Gloc9, Louie Ocampo and Teery Zhong	
May 23–24	Various	Metropolitan Theater	Manila	Pulso Pilipinas: Mga Likhang Sayaw	—N/a	
May 24	Sheree Bautista	Music Museum	San Juan	L' Art de Sheree	—N/a	
May 24–25	Ogie Alcasid, Nicole Laurel Asensio, Mark Bautista, Jackie Lou Blanco, Kuh Ledesma, Martin Nievera, Zsa Zsa Padilla, Katrina Velarde, Regine Velasquez	The Theatre, Solaire Resort & Casino	Parañaque	The Music of Cecile Azarcon: 45th Anniversary Concert	—N/a	
May 26	Steps Dance Studio	Samsung Performing Arts Theater, Circuit Makati	Makati	Dancing Into 30	—N/a	
May 30	Jinky Vidal	Centerplay, City of Dreams	Parañaque	Jinky Vidal Live!	Part of the Centerplay Concert Series	
May 31	KD Estrada, Alexa Ilacad	Music Museum	San Juan	Add To Heart: KDLex in Concert	—N/a	
June 1	Darren Espanto	Araneta Coliseum	Quezon	D10: Darren Espanto's 10th Anniversary Concert	With special guests, Ogie Alcasid, Lyca Gairanod, Sarah Geronimo, Erik Santos, Gary Valenciano, and Vice Ganda	
June 1	Chicosci, Autotelic, One Click Straight, Party Pace, bird., Carousel Casualties, etc.	SaGuijo Café + Bar	Makati	SaGuijo XX	—N/a	
June 2	Kitchie Nadal	New Frontier Theater	Quezon	Same Ground: Kitchie Nadal's 20th Anniversary Concert	—N/a	
June 8	Bullet Dumas	Music Museum	San Juan	Nananatili	—N/a	
June 8	Beast House Pole and Aerial Dance Studio	The Theatre, Solaire Resort & Casino	Parañaque	10VE: 10th Anniversary Show and Student Showcase	—N/a	
June 12	Bini	Burnham Green, Quirino Grandstand	Manila	Musikalayaan	—N/a	
June 14–15	Alice Reyes Dance Philippines	Samsung Performing Arts Theater, Circuit Makati	Makati	Carmina Burana	—N/a	
June 22–30	Jon Santos	Samsung Performing Arts Theater, Circuit Makati	Makati	Bawat Bonggang Bagay	—N/a	
June 23 and 30	ACTS Manila	The Theatre, Solaire Resort & Casino	Parañaque	AKTS Maynila! Exploring the Roads, Less Traveled	—N/a	
June 28	Ice Seguerra	Music Museum	San Juan	Ice Seguerra Videoke Hits: The Repeat	Originally scheduled on June 1, but moved to June 28 for health reasons.	
June 28–30	Bini	New Frontier Theater	Quezon	Biniverse: The First Solo Concert	—N/a	
June 29	Philippine Philharmonic Orchestra	Metropolitan Theater	Manila	OST Symphony K-Drama in Concert	—N/a	
June 29	Gerald Santos	Music Museum	San Juan	Grateful: The 18th Anniversary Concert	—N/a	
July 5	Jed Madela	Music Museum	San Juan	Welcome to My World	—N/a	
July 5–7	Tanghalang Pilipino Actors Company	Tanghalang Ignacio B. Gimenez, CCP Complex	Pasay	CCP Out of the Box: Ganito Kami Noon... Paano Kayo Ngayon?	—N/a	
July 6–7	Philippine Ballet Theatre	Samsung Performing Arts Theater, Circuit Makati	Makati	Sarimanok	—N/a	
July 7	G Force	The Theatre, Solaire Resort & Casino	Parañaque	G Force Project 2024 Dance Concert	—N/a	
July 11	Ara Mina	Newport Performing Arts Theater	Pasay	All of Me	—N/a	
July 11	MYMP, Neocolours, Rivermaya	The Theatre, Solaire Resort & Casino	Parañaque	All Hits: Just The Way You Want It	With special guests, Wency Cornejo, Geneva Cruz, Jon Santos, and Lloyd Umali	
July 12	Bini, Flow G, SB19, SunKissed Lola	Araneta Coliseum	Quezon	Puregold: Nasa Atin Ang Panalo Thanksgiving Concert	—N/a	
July 12–13	Hajji Alejandro, Boboy Garrovillo, Jim Paredes, Marco Sison, Rey Valera, Nonoy Zuñiga	Newport Performing Arts Theater	Pasay	The Hit Society	—N/a	
July 13	Belle Mariano	The Theatre, Solaire Resort & Casino	Parañaque	Believe	—N/a	
July 19	Dingdong Avanzado	The Theatre, Solaire Resort & Casino	Parañaque	Original Prince of Pinoy Pop	With special guests, Jessa Zaragoza, Jayda, Pablo, and Randy Santiago	
July 19	Dulce	Teatrino Promenade	San Juan	Dulce...SOLID! The Birthday Concert	—N/a	
July 20	Noel Cabangon, Joey Generoso, Ice Seguerra	Newport Performing Arts Theater	Pasay	Strings and Voices: A Threelogy Series The Repeat	—N/a	
July 25	Carla Guevarra-Laforteza	Tanghalang Ignacio B. Gimenez, CCP Complex	Pasay	Triple Threat I	—N/a	
July 27	Felip	Space, One Ayala	Makati	7sins Album Concert	—N/a	
July 27–28	Julie Anne San Jose, Stell	New Frontier Theater	Quezon	Julie Anne X Stell: Ang Ating Tinig	—N/a	
August 2–3	FILharmoniKA	Newport Performing Arts Theater	Pasay	Do You Hear the People Sing?	Conducted by Gerard Salonga	
August 4	Rico Blanco, Cup of Joe, Ebe Dancel, G22, TJ Monterde, Sandara Park, SB19	Mall of Asia Arena	Pasay	Acer Day 2024	—N/a	
August 9–11	Ballet Philippines	The Theatre, Solaire Resort & Casino	Parañaque	Relevé: La Sylphide	—N/a	
August 11	Gigi de Lana, Esay, Haki, Letters from June, Neocolours, Silent Sanctuary, Stell	Araneta Coliseum	Quezon	Obscure: The Wish 107.5 10th Anniversary Concert	—N/a	
August 16–18	Barefoot Theatre Collaborative	Samsung Performing Arts Theater, Circuit Makati	Makati	Mula Sa Buwan	—N/a	
August 18	Alamat, G22, Hori7on, KAIA, SB19	Mall of Asia Arena	Pasay	Watsons Playlist: The P-pop Power Concert	—N/a	
August 24	Klarisse de Guzman, JM dela Cerna, Darren Espanto, KD Estrada, Lyka Estrella, Alexa Ilacad, Marielle Montillano, Erik Santos	The Theatre, Solaire Resort & Casino	Parañaque	The Maestro Series: The Louie Ocampo Playlist	—N/a	
August 30	December Avenue	Mall of Asia Arena	Pasay	Sa Ilalim ng mga Bituin: December Avenue 15th Anniversary Concert	—N/a	
August 31	Mark Bautista	The Theatre, Solaire Resort & Casino	Parañaque	Mark My Dreams	—N/a	
August 31–September 1	Ballet Manila	Aliw Theater	Pasay	Giselle	—N/a	
September 5	Alamat, Kyle Echarri, Illest Morena, NewJeans, Nick Makino, Zack Tabudlo	Mall of Asia Arena	Pasay	Coke Studio The Ultimate Fandom Concert	—N/a	
September 7–8	FILharmoniKA	The Theatre, Solaire Resort & Casino	Parañaque	Star Wars: A New Hope in Concert	Conducted by Gerard Salonga	
September 10	Pops Fernandez, Nina, Joseph Marco, Kelvin Miranda, Martin Nievera, Daryl Ong, Angeline Quinto, Rocksteddy	Marcos Stadium	Laoag	Marcos 107	—N/a	
September 14	Ely Buendia	The Theatre, Solaire Resort & Casino	Parañaque	Ely Buendia Live	—N/a	
September 21	Janine Teñoso, Side A	Newport Performing Arts Theater	Pasay	Bounded by Sound	—N/a	
September 26	3rd Avenue	Music Museum	San Juan	3rd AVEinte	—N/a	
September 27	Martin Nievera	Araneta Coliseum	Quezon	The King 4ever	—N/a	
September 27	Philippine Philharmonic Orchestra	Samsung Performing Arts Theater, Circuit Makati	Makati	PPO Concert I - FIESTA!	Conducted by Grzegorz Nowak	
September 28	Neil Pedrosa	Music Museum	San Juan	Quarenta	—N/a	
October 4, 12	Over October	Music Museum	San Juan	Ikot sa Music Museum	—N/a	
October 5	Apo Hiking Society, The Company	Music Museum	San Juan	In The Company of Apo Hiking Society	—N/a	
October 5	Philippine Madrigal Singers	Plenary Hall – Philippine International Convention Center	Pasay	IntenSIXTY	—N/a	
October 5	December Avenue, Kaia, Nadine Lustre, Maki, Zack Tabudlo	City Di Mare	Cebu	Fusion X Cebu	Directed by John Prats	
October 10–20	Dolly de Leon, Lea Salonga	Samsung Performing Arts Theater, Circuit Makati	Makati	Request sa Radyo	—N/a	
October 11	Acel Bisa	Teatrino Promenade	San Juan	Being & Becoming: Acel's Farewell Concert	It is Acel's final concert, marking the end of her musical career.	
October 11	Katrina Velarde	New Frontier Theater	Quezon	SiKat v.3	—N/a	
October 12, 13 and 19	Ballet Manila	Aliw Theater	Pasay	Florante at Laura	—N/a	
October 15	Various artists	Mall of Asia Arena	Pasay	Billboard Philippines: Mainstage — the Year One Anniversary	—N/a	
October 17	Shiela Valderrama-Martinez	Tanghalang Ignacio B. Gimenez, CCP Complex	Pasay	Triple Threat II	—N/a	
October 18	Kuh Ledesma	Music Museum	San Juan	Sings her ABCs	—N/a	
October 18	Orange and Lemons	Metrotent Convention Center	Pasig	Now and Then: Orange and Lemons 25th Anniversary Concert	—N/a	
October 19	Sugar Hiccup	123 Block, Mandala Park	Mandaluyong	Sugar Hiccup: 30 Reunion Tour 2024	First reunion concert tour. With special guests Barbie Almalbis, Taken by Cars, Aunt Robert, and The Purest Blue.	
October 25	Sugar Hiccup	Canto Bogchi Joint	Baguio	Sugar Hiccup: 30 Reunion Tour 2024	—N/a	
October 25	Arthur Nery	Araneta Coliseum	Quezon	Arthur Nery at the Big Dome	—N/a	
October 26	Sugar Hiccup	TBA	Cebu	Sugar Hiccup: 30 Reunion Tour 2024	—N/a	
October 29	Manila Philharmonic Orchestra	Samsung Performing Arts Theater, Circuit Makati	Makati	Lights, Camera, Encore	—N/a	
October 30	Nina	The Theatre, Solaire Resort & Casino	Parañaque	Only Nina	With special guest, David Pomeranz, Randy Santiago, and Ian Veneracion	
November 8	Streetboys	New Frontier Theater	Quezon	Streetboys: The Reunion	—N/a	
November 9	Ella May Saison, South Border	The Theatre, Solaire Resort & Casino	Parañaque	Soundtrip Sessions Vol. 3	—N/a	
November 15	Manila Symphony Orchestra	New Frontier Theater	Quezon	A Night at the Pops	With special guests, Barbie Almalbis, Jason Dhakal, Arthur Miguel, and Lola Amour	
November 15	Philippine Philharmonic Orchestra	Samsung Performing Arts Theater	Makati	PPO Concert II — Triumph	Conducted by Grzegorz Nowak	
November 15–December 8	Tanghalang Pilipino	Tanghalang Ignacio B. Gimenez, CCP Complex	Pasay	Sandosenang Sapatos	—N/a	
November 16	The Ridleys	Music Museum	San Juan	Someday We'll Make A Home	—N/a	
November 16	Vina Morales	Winford Hotel and Casino	Manila	The Ultimate Performer	—N/a	
November 16–18	Bini	Araneta Coliseum	Quezon	The Grand Biniverse	Originally scheduled on October 4.	
November 16–17	FILharmoniKA	Samsung Performing Arts Theater, Circuit Makati	Makati	Frozen in Concert	—N/a	
November 20	Khimo	Music Museum	San Juan	Khimo: Emerge, Energize, Elevate	Originally scheduled on October 25 but postponed due to severe weather conditions	
November 22	Marco Sison, Rey Valera	Music Museum	San Juan	Ang Guwapo at ang Masuwerte	—N/a	
November 22	Philippine Philharmonic Orchestra	Samsung Performing Arts Theater, Circuit Makati	Makati	Music, Movies, Magic	Conducted by Gerard Salonga	
November 23	Raymond Lauchengco	The Theatre, Solaire Resort & Casino	Parañaque	Just Got Lucky: Raymond Lauchengco 40th Anniversary Concert	—N/a	
November 23 – December 15	Repertory Philippines	Eastwood Theater	Quezon	Jepoy at the Magic Circle	—N/a	
November 29	Juan Karlos	Mall of Asia Arena	Pasay	juan karlos LIVE	—N/a	
November 29–30	Maki	New Frontier Theater	Quezon	Maki-Concert sa New Frontier	With special guests, Cesca, Johnoy Danao, Ebe Dancel, Angela Ken, Nameless Kids, and Sitti	
November 30	Side A, Janine Teñoso	The Theatre, Solaire Resort & Casino	Parañaque	Bounded by Sound	—N/a	
November 30	Ogie Alcasid	Newport Performing Arts Theater	Pasay	Ogieoke 2	With special guest, Bini, JM dela Cerna and Marielle Montillano	
November 30	Apo Hiking Society, The Company	Music Museum	San Juan	In The Company of Apo Hiking Society	—N/a	
November 30	Various artists (including Cheats, Lola Amour, Oh, Flamingo!, Over October, Unique Salonga)	123 Block, Mandala Park	Mandaluyong	Linya-Linya Land 2024	—N/a	
November 30–December 1	Ballet Philippines	Samsung Performing Arts Theater, Circuit Makati	Makati	The Nutcracker	—N/a	
December 4	Manila Symphony Orchestra	St. Michael of Archangel Church, Bonifacio Global City	Taguig	The Majesty of Christmas	—N/a	
December 6	December Avenue	Mall of Asia Arena	Pasay	Sa Ilalim ng mga Bituin: December Avenue 15th Anniversary Concert - The Repeat	—N/a	
December 6	The Ridleys	Music Museum	San Juan	Someday We'll Make A Home	—N/a	
December 6	Philippine Philharmonic Orchestra	Samsung Performing Arts Theater	Makati	PPO Concert III — Fantasy	Conducted by Grzegorz Nowak	
December 6	Alamat	New Frontier Theater	Quezon	Ragasa: The Concert	—N/a	
December 6–8	Ballet Philippines	The Theatre, Solaire Resort & Casino	Parañaque	Relevé: Peter Pan	—N/a	
December 7	Jose Mari Chan	Newport Performing Arts Theater	Pasay	Oh Christmas Tree	—N/a	
December 7–8	Association of Ballet Academies of the Philippines, Inc.	Samsung Performing Arts Theater, Circuit Makati	Makati	ABAP Danseries 31: PINASayaw	—N/a	
December 11	Andrew E.	New Frontier Theater	Quezon	1 Time For Your Mind	With special guests, Regine Velasquez, Martin Nievera, Heaven Peralejo, Anygma, and Salbakuta	
December 12	Tanya Manalang-Atadero	Tanghalang Ignacio B. Gimenez, CCP Complex	Pasay	Triple Threat III	—N/a	
December 13–15	Steps Dance Studio	Samsung Performing Arts Theater, Circuit Makati	Makati	Christmas Ballets	—N/a	
December 14	Denise Julia	New Frontier Theater	Quezon	Sweet Nothings: The Denise Julia Experience	—N/a	
December 14	Ben&Ben	Mall of Asia Arena	Pasay	The Traveller Across Dimensions: Live	—N/a	
December 14	Angel, Bernie, Captivating Katkat, Maxie, Popstar Bench, Precious Paula Nicole, Turing	Music Museum	San Juan	Queens Are Coming To Town: A Dazzling Christmas Extravaganza	—N/a	
December 19	The Theater Luminaries, UST Singers, Mari Dance Company	Samsung Performing Arts Theater, Circuit Makati	Makati	Come Home to Christmas	—N/a	
December 20	Lyka Estrella	Music Museum	San Juan	Lyka: The Solo Concert	—N/a	
December 20 and 22	Gary Valenciano	Araneta Coliseum	Quezon	Pure Energy: One More Time	The December 20 concert was cut short due to Valenciano's health concerns.	
December 25–29	Ballet Manila	Aliw Theater	Pasay	Snow White	—N/a	
December 29	Philippine Madrigal Singers	The Theatre, Solaire Resort & Casino	Parañaque	2007: The Reunion Concert	—N/a	
December 30	The Juans, Maki, Toneejay	Marikina Sports Center	Marikina	Year-End Concert 2024	—N/a	
December 30	Arthur Miguel, The Ridleys, Sud	Riverbanks Center	Marikina	Riverbanks Year-End Concert 2024	—N/a	

=== International artists ===
Date(s)	Headliner(s)	Venue	City	Event / Tour	Note(s)	Ref(s)
January 1–7	Various	Mall of Asia Arena	Pasay	Disney on Ice	—N/a	
January 6	Yesung	New Frontier Theater	Quezon	Unfading Sense	—N/a	
January 13–14	Seventeen	Philippine Sports Stadium	Bocaue	Follow Tour	Seventeen members Jeonghan and S.Coups did not join due to their respective injuries.	
January 14	Mark Tuan	Skydome – SM City North EDSA	Quezon	The Other Side: Asia Tour	—N/a	
January 19–20	Coldplay	Philippine Arena	Bocaue	Music of the Spheres World Tour	With Jikamarie as the opening act on both dates and with Lola Amour and Dilaw as surprise guests on January 19 and 20, respectively	
January 21	NCT 127	Philippine Sports Stadium	Bocaue	Neo City – The Unity	—N/a	
January 23	Melanie Martinez	World Trade Center	Pasay	Portals Tour	—N/a	
January 26	The Rose	Araneta Coliseum	Quezon	Dawn to Dusk	—N/a	
January 26–27	The Jets	Newport Performing Arts Theater	Pasay	The Jets Live!	—N/a	
January 28	Brent Faiyaz	New Frontier Theater	Quezon	FTW: It's a Wasteland Tour	—N/a	
January 28	Build Jakapan	Skydome – SM City North EDSA	Quezon	Build First Fanmeet in Manila	—N/a	
February 3	Enhypen	New Clark City Athletics Stadium	Capas	Fate	—N/a	
February 10	Scrubb	123 Mandala Park	Mandaluyong	Scrubb Live	—N/a	
February 16	Julia Fordham	The Theatre, Solaire Resort & Casino	Parañaque	Julia Fordham: A Valentine Concert	With special guest, Christian Bautista	
February 16	Sungha Jung	Skydome – SM City North EDSA	Quezon	Sungha Jung Live	—N/a	
February 17	Park Hyung-sik	Araneta Coliseum	Quezon	SIKcret Time	—N/a	
February 17	Ryan Gallagher	Music Museum	San Juan	The Voice of Ryan	—N/a	
February 22	Jonas Brothers	Mall of Asia Arena	Pasay	Five Albums. One Night. The World Tour	—N/a	
February 23	Planetshakers	SM Seaside City Concert Grounds	Cebu	Show Me Your Glory Tour	—N/a	
February 24	Choi Young-jae	New Frontier Theater	Quezon	Inside Out Tour	—N/a	
February 27–28	Tabernacle Choir	Mall of Asia Arena	Pasay	Hope Tour	With special guests, Lea Salonga and Ysabelle Cuevas	
March 1	Im Yoon-ah	SMX Convention Center	Pasay	Yoonite Fan Meet	—N/a	
March 1	Eric Moo	Newport Performing Arts Theater	Pasay	Eric Moo Live in Manila	—N/a	
March 2	Various	The Theatre, Solaire Resort & Casino	Parañaque	The Simon & Garfunkel Story	—N/a	
March 2	Jeff Satur	New Frontier Theater	Quezon	Space Shuttle No. 8 Asia Tour	—N/a	
March 4	B.I	Mall of Asia Arena	Pasay	Privé Alliance meets B.I	—N/a	
March 9	Ed Sheeran	SMDC Festival Grounds, Aseana City	Parañaque	+–=÷× Tour	With special guests, Calum Scott and Ben&Ben	
March 9–10	The Platters	Newport Performing Arts Theater	Pasay	The Golden Sounds of the Platters	—N/a	
March 11	Wave to Earth	New Frontier Theater	Quezon	The First Era	—N/a	
March 12	Slash	New Frontier Theater	Quezon	The River Is Rising – Rest of the World Tour	Featuring Myles Kennedy and The Conspirators Plus Special Guests, Black Sonic Pearls.	
March 13	Wave to Earth	New Frontier Theater	Quezon	The First Era	—N/a	
March 13	Janet Jackson	Araneta Coliseum	Quezon	Together Again	—N/a	
March 15	Various	Skydome – SM City North EDSA	Quezon	Wannabe: Featuring the hits of Spice Girls	—N/a	
March 16	Cha Eun-woo	Mall of Asia Arena	Pasay	Mystery Elevator	—N/a	
March 16	Various	Cuneta Astrodome	Pasay	Bon Jovi Keep The Faith Tribute Rock of the 80s	—N/a	
March 16–17	Magic Men Australia	Newport Performing Arts Theater	Pasay	Magic Men Australia Asia Tour	—N/a	
March 17	Bobby	Skydome – SM City North EDSA	Quezon	Zero Gravity Tour Asia	—N/a	
March 22	H1-Key	New Frontier Theater	Quezon	Go Run! H1-Key in Manila	With special guest, Josh Cullen	
March 23	Xdinary Heroes	New Frontier Theater	Quezon	Break the Brake: World Tour	—N/a	
March 30	Gatecreeper, Suffocation	The Eastside	Marikina	Suffocation x Gatecreeper Live!	—N/a	
March 23 – May 12	Various	The Theatre, Solaire Resort & Casino	Parañaque	Miss Saigon	—N/a	
April 7	IKon	Araneta Coliseum	Quezon	Get Back: IKon Limited Tour	—N/a	
April 7	BtoB	Mall of Asia Arena	Pasay	2024 BtoB Fan-Con: Our Dream	—N/a	
April 8	James Taylor	Mall of Asia Arena	Pasay	An Evening with James Taylor	With special guests, Ice Seguerra and Noel Cabangon	
April 11	Umi	Samsung Hall – SM Aura Premier	Taguig	Taking to the Wind Tour	—N/a	
April 12	Music Travel Love	Skydome – SM City North EDSA	Quezon	Music Travel Love Asia Tour	—N/a	
April 13	Wheein	Skydome – SM City North EDSA	Quezon	Whee in the Mood	—N/a	
April 13	Baekhyun	Araneta Coliseum	Quezon	Lonsdaleite	—N/a	
April 14	Music Travel Love	SMX Convention Center – SM City Davao	Davao	Music Travel Love Asia Tour	—N/a	
April 20	J.R. Richards	Skydome – SM City North EDSA	Quezon	J.R. Richards Live	With P.O.T. as the opening act.	
April 20	Boys Like Girls	Araneta Coliseum	Quezon	Spring Tour 2024	—N/a	
April 21	We The Kings	SMX Convention Center – SM City Davao	Davao	We The Kings Asia Tour 2024	—N/a	
April 25	Incubus	Araneta Coliseum	Quezon	Incubus: Asia Tour	—N/a	
April 26	Debbie Gibson	New Frontier Theater	Quezon	Electric Youth	—N/a	
May 1	Radwimps	Araneta Coliseum	Quezon	The Way You Yawn, and the Outcry of Peace	—N/a	
May 3	All Time Low	Araneta Coliseum	Quezon	All Time Low Forever	—N/a	
May 4	Treasure	Mall of Asia Arena	Pasay	Relay Tour: Reboot	—N/a	
May 7	Prep	Filinvest Tent	Muntinlupa	2024 Asia Tour	Part of the Karpos Live series	
May 13	Niall Horan	Mall of Asia Arena	Pasay	The Show: Live on Tour	—N/a	
May 15	Arch Enemy	Skydome – SM City North EDSA	Quezon	Deceivers: Asia Tour	—N/a	
May 15	10cm	New Frontier Theater	Quezon	Closer to You	—N/a	
May 18	Various	The Theatre, Solaire Resort & Casino	Parañaque	Chicago Funk - The Music of Earth, Wind & Fire	—N/a	
May 20	Elijah Woods	The Podium Hall	Mandaluyong	ily 24/7, 365	—N/a	
May 28–29	Laufey	Plenary Hall – Philippine International Convention Center	Pasay	A Night at the Symphony	Featuring the Manila Philharmonic Orchestra	
May 29	Gayle	The Podium Hall	Mandaluyong	(My First Time) in Asia 2024 Tour	—N/a	
May 30	Snoh Aalegra	Filinvest Tent	Muntinlupa	Snoh Aalegra Live!	Part of the Karpos Live series	
June 1	IU	Philippine Arena	Bocaue	H.E.R. World Tour	—N/a	
June 1	Bang Ye-dam	Samsung Hall – SM Aura Premier	Taguig	Be Your D..	—N/a	
June 1	Jason Wade	New Frontier Theater	Quezon	Jason Wade and the Best of Lifehouse	—N/a	
June 7–8	Various	Carlos P. Romulo Auditorium, RCBC Plaza	Makati	I Love You, You're Perfect, Now Change	—N/a	
June 11	Alexander 23	The Podium Hall	Mandaluyong	American Boy in Asia Tour	—N/a	
June 13	Vaultboy	The Podium Hall	Mandaluyong	Vaultboy Asia Tour 2024	—N/a	
June 15	Lucas Wong	New Frontier Theater	Quezon	Lucas Fancon Tour Asia:FIAT LUX	—N/a	
June 16	Solar	The Theatre, Solaire Resort & Casino	Parañaque	Colours	—N/a	
June 18	David Foster, All-4-One, Brian McKnight, Katharine McPhee	Araneta Coliseum	Quezon	Hitman: David Foster and Friends Asia Tour	With special guests, Stell, JV Decena, and Joaquin Garcia	
June 22	Suho	Araneta Coliseum	Quezon	Suho Concert <SU:HOME> Asia Tour	—N/a	
June 28	Various	The Theatre, Solaire Resort & Casino	Parañaque	ABBA: Revisted	—N/a	
July 6	Hitsujibungaku	123 Block, Mandala Park	Mandaluyong	Hitsujibungaku Asia Tour 2024	—N/a	
July 6–7	Blippi with Meekah	New Frontier Theater	Quezon	Blippi: The Wonderful World Tour	—N/a	
July 7	OnlyOneOf	Samsung Hall – SM Aura Premier	Taguig	Dopamine	—N/a	
July 9	Dvwn	Samsung Hall – SM Aura Premier	Taguig	See the Sea	—N/a	
July 13	Ive	Mall of Asia Arena	Pasay	Show What I Have World Tour	—N/a	
July 14	Riize	Araneta Coliseum	Quezon	Riizing Day	—N/a	
July 19	Javier Parisi	Newport Performing Arts Theater	Pasay	Tribute to John Lennon	—N/a	
July 20	David Benoit	The Theatre, Solaire Resort & Casino	Parañaque	An Evening With David Benoit	—N/a	
August 2	XG	Araneta Coliseum	Quezon	XG World Tour: The First Howl	—N/a	
August 3	Itzy	Mall of Asia Arena	Pasay	Born to Be World Tour	Lia did not participate due to her health-related hiatus.	
August 10–11	NCT Dream	Mall of Asia Arena	Pasay	NCT Dream World Tour: The Dream Show 3	—N/a	
August 11	Dhruv	Ayala Malls Manila Bay	Parañaque	Dhruv Live @ Ayala Malls Manila Bay	With special participation of Justin	
August 17	Crash Adams	Trinoma	Quezon	Crash Adams Live @ Trinoma	With special participation of Lola Amour.	
August 19	Sasha Alex Sloan	The Podium Hall	Mandaluyong	Me Again Tour Asia	—N/a	
August 21	Lauren Spencer-Smith	Eastwood City	Quezon	LSS in Manila	With special guest Janine Berdin.	
August 23	Tori Kelly	New Frontier Theater	Quezon	Purple Skies Asia Tour	With Special Guest, Maisy Kay.	
August 25	Conan Gray	Araneta Coliseum	Quezon	Found Heaven On Tour	—N/a	
August 25	The Boyz	Mall of Asia Arena	Pasay	The Boyz World Tour: Zeneration II	—N/a	
August 30	Secondhand Serenade	New Frontier Theater	Quezon	Secondhand Serenade Live	—N/a	
August 31	D.O	TBA	TBA	Asia Fan Concert Tour: Bloom	—N/a	
September 1	Jae Park	Skydome – SM City North EDSA	Quezon	When the Rain Stopped Following Tour	—N/a	
September 2	Laufey	Mall of Asia Arena	Pasay	Bewitched Tour	—N/a	
September 7	Bruno Major	Plenary Hall – Philippine International Convention Center	Pasay	Bruno Major Asia Tour 2024	—N/a	
September 11	Red Jumpsuit Apparatus	SMX Convention Center	Davao	Red Jumpsuit Apparatus Live!	—N/a	
September 12	Red Jumpsuit Apparatus	Skydome – SM City North EDSA	Quezon	Red Jumpsuit Apparatus Live!	—N/a	
September 14	David Archuleta	New Frontier Theater	Quezon	The Best of David Archuleta	—N/a	
September 14	Red Velvet	Mall of Asia Arena	Pasay	Happiness: My Dear, ReVe1uv	—N/a	
September 21	Sandy Redd	Newport Performing Arts Theater	Pasay	Rolling on the River: The Tina Turner Tribute Concert	—N/a	
September 22	The Volunteers	Skydome – SM City North EDSA	Quezon	The Volunteers: Asia Tour 2024	—N/a	
September 27–28	The Maine	Skydome – SM City North EDSA	Quezon	The Sweet Sixteen Tour	—N/a	
September 28	Anne-Marie	The Podium Hall	Mandaluyong	The Unhealthy Club Tour	—N/a	
September 28	Chloe Feston	The Theatre, Solaire Resort & Casino	Parañaque	The Carpenters: Reborn	With special guest, Marco Sison	
September 29	Hindley Street Country Club	New Frontier Theater	Quezon	Hindley Street Country Club: The Greatest Cover Band in the World	—N/a	
October 1–20	Various	The Theatre, Solaire Resort & Casino	Parañaque	Six	—N/a	
October 5	Olivia Rodrigo	Philippine Arena	Bocaue	Guts World Tour	—N/a	
October 8	Ne-Yo	Araneta Coliseum	Quezon	Champagne and Roses Tour	—N/a	
October 11-12	Trina Johnson Finn	Newport Performing Arts Theater	Pasay	Queen Of The Night: Remembering Whitney	—N/a	
October 12	Zerobaseone	Mall of Asia Arena	Pasay	The First Tour	—N/a	
October 12	LANY	Philippine Arena	Bocaue	a beautiful blur: the world tour	With support from Culture Wars.	
October 13–15	LANY	Waterfront Hotel & Casino	Cebu	a beautiful blur: the world tour	With support from Culture Wars.	
October 17	Big Time Rush	New Frontier Theater	Quezon	Big Time Rush: Australia and Asia Tour	—N/a	
October 17	Steve Aoki	Xylo — The Palace Manila, Uptown Bonifacio	Taguig	The Palace 10th Year Anniversary	—N/a	
October 26	The Bootleg Beatles	The Theatre, Solaire Resort & Casino	Parañaque	The Bootleg Beetles Live!	—N/a	
October 27	David Pomeranz	Baguio Convention Center	Baguio	David Pomeranz Live	—N/a	
November 4	Tate McRae	New Frontier Theater	Quezon	Think Later World Tour	—N/a	
November 5	Michael Learns to Rock	Mall of Asia Arena	Pasay	Take Us to Your Heart Tour	—N/a	
November 5	The Kid Laroi	New Frontier Theater	Quezon	The First Time	—N/a	
November 8	Hillsong London	SM Seaside City Concert Grounds	Cebu	Hillsong London Live	With ICM Choir as the opening act.	
November 9	Matt Maltese	Skydome – SM City North EDSA	Quezon	A Tour That Is Mine	With special guest Janine Teñoso.	
November 10	Hillsong London	Mall of Asia Arena	Pasay	Hillsong London Live	—N/a	
November 10	Incognito	New Frontier Theater	Quezon	INCOGNITO Live in Manila	—N/a	
November 13	Dua Lipa	Philippine Arena	Bocaue	Radical Optimism Tour	—N/a	
November 16–17	2NE1	Mall of Asia Arena	Pasay	Welcome Back 2024–25 Asia Tour	—N/a	
November 19	Jamie xx	Filinvest Tent	Muntinlupa	In Waves Tour	Part of the Karpos Live series	
November 23	Stray Kids	Philippine Arena	Bocaue	DominATE	—N/a	
November 24	Taemin	Araneta Coliseum	Quezon	Ephemeral Gaze World Tour	—N/a	
December 3	Akon	Mall of Asia Arena	Pasay	V1BE Manila Presents: Akon – The Superfan Tour	With featured guests Ez Mil, Lucas, Gloc-9, Flow G, Pablo, Dappest x ADL, Legit Misfitz, Chocolate Factory, and DJ Kate Jagdon.	
December 5	Air Supply	SMX Convention Center – SM City Bacolod	Bacolod	Lost in Love Experience Tour	—N/a	
December 5	Wisp	Skydome – SM City North EDSA	Quezon	Wisp Live in Manila	—N/a	
December 8	Porter Robinson	The Podium Hall	Mandaluyong	Smile! :D World Tour	—N/a	
December 8	Gene Loves Jezebel, Ian McNabb, Per Øystein Sørensen	Mall of Asia Arena	Pasay	New Wave Tribe Festival	—N/a	
December 8	Last Dinosaurs	Skydome – SM City North EDSA	Quezon	Last Dinosaurs Live!	With special guest Oh, Flamingo! as opening act.	
December 9	Air Supply	Waterfront Hotel & Casino	Cebu	Lost in Love Experience Tour	—N/a	
December 10	Fujii Kaze	Mall of Asia Arena	Pasay	The Best of Fujii Kaze	—N/a	
December 11	Air Supply	SMX Convention Center – SM City Davao	Davao	Lost in Love Experience Tour	—N/a	
December 21–23, 25–30	Various	Mall of Asia Arena	Pasay	Disney on Ice	—N/a	

=== New Year's Eve events ===
Headliner(s)	Venue	City	Event / Tour	Note(s)	Ref(s)
Gigi De Lana, MYMP	City of Dreams Manila	Parañaque	New Year's Eve Celebrations 2025	—N/a	
Bituin Escalante, Martin Nievera, Lea Salonga	Solaire Resort & Casino	Parañaque	Stars Collide: The Solaire NYE Party	—N/a	
Christian Bautista, Darren Espanto, Jona, Lani Misalucha, Zsa Zsa Padilla, Mitoy Yonting	Okada Manila	Parañaque	Bright Beginnings to 2025	—N/a	
Quintino, various DJs	Cove Manila, Okada Manila	Parañaque	Unleash 2025	—N/a	
Avantgardey, BGYO, DJ Soda, Jabbawockeez, Ne-Yo	Solaire Resort North	Quezon	Ultimate Solaire NYE Party	Hosted by Billy Crawford	
Kat DJ, Mars Miranda, Brenda Muñoz, Renee Rosete	Skybar, Solaire North	Quezon	Party in the Sky	—N/a	
Barbie Almalbis, Dione, Dionela, TJ Monterde, KZ Tandingan, Janine Teñoso	Eastwood City	Quezon	Eastwood City New Year Countdown to 2025	—N/a	
Various artists from GMA, SB19	SM Mall of Asia	Pasay	Kapuso Countdown to 2025	Also televised on GMA Network	
Bamboo, Bini, Jed Madela, Angeline Quinto	Newport World Resorts	Pasay	The Grand Countdown to 2025	—N/a	
Bamboo, Bini, Gloc-9, Lola Amour, Marina Summers, Gary Valenciano	Ayala Avenue corner Makati Avenue	Makati	Radiating on Top – Ayala Makati's New Year Countdown 2025	Hosted by Ai Dela Cruz and Justin Quirino.	
Rico Blanco, Sarah Geronimo, Honne, Itzy, Juan Karlos	5th Avenue, Bonifacio Global City	Taguig	NYE at the 5th	—N/a	
Various DJs (Marc Marasigan, Mars Miranda, Marc Raval)	The Palace Manila, Uptown Bonifacio	Taguig	New Year's Eve Countdown	—N/a	
Janine Berdin, Yeng Constantino, DJ Jimmy Nocon, Orange and Lemons, Sponge Cola	Bridgetowne Concert Grounds	Pasig	Bridgetowne Countdown to 2025	Hosted by Macoy Dubs and MJ Lastimosa.	
The Dawn, Maki, Nobita, Shamrock	Philippine Arena	Bocaue	Countdown to 2025: The Net 25's New Year Celebration	Also televised on Net 25	

=== Music festivals ===
Date(s)	Event	Venue	City	Notable performers	Note(s)	Ref(s)
January 6–7	Circus Music Festival 3	Circuit Makati	Makati	6cyclemind; Ely Buendia; Franco; Freestyle; Al James; Juan Karlos; The Juans; Kamikazee; Kjwan; Mayonnaise; Armi Millare; Nobita; Noel and Minong; Orange and Lemons; Parokya ni Edgar; Silent Sanctuary; South Border; Sponge Cola; SunKissed Lola; Zack Tabudlo; Unique; Urbandub	The event was originally scheduled on September 30, 2023, but was postponed due to inclement weather. Part of the Circus Music Festival series.	
January 20	Sinulog Music Festival 2024	SRP Carnival Area	Cebu	Various local artists/bands from Cebu	—N/a	
February 11	Emo Fest	Skydome — SM City North EDSA	Quezon	Chicosci; Typecast	—N/a	
February 12–17	UP Fair 2024	Sunken Garden, University of the Philippines Diliman	Quezon	Alamat; Autotelic; Ace Banzuelo; Janine Berdin; BINI; Dilaw; Flow G; Gloc-9; Imago; The Itchyworms; Juan Karlos; Lola Amour; Munimuni; Unique Salonga; Sandwich	The aggregated event for the 2024 edition is divided into 6 events: Hiwaga (Monday, Feb. 12); Pop Rising (Tuesday, Feb. 13); Kalye Tunes (Wednesday, Feb. 14); Quests (Thursday, Feb. 15); Elements (Friday, Feb. 16); REV Music Festival (Saturday, Feb. 17)	
February 24–25	Bobapalooza Music and Arts Festival	Filinvest City Event Grounds	Muntinlupa	Atarashii Gakko!; Autotelic; Bad Suns; The Band Camino; Chicosci; December Avenue; The Itchyworms; Juan Karlos; Nobita; Pale Waves; Sandwich; Tanya Markova; Urbandub	—N/a	
March 9–10	Wanderland Music and Arts Festival	Filinvest City Event Grounds	Muntinlupa	Beenzino; Jeff Bernat; Breakbot; Cosmo's Midnight; Gabba; Grentperez; Hwasa; Jack Johnson; Lola Amour; Ena Mori; PJ Morton; Novo Amor; Parcels; Thundercat; The Walters	—N/a	
March 14–16	BarakoFest 2024	Manila-Batangas Bypass Road	Lipa	Al James; December Avenue; Juan Karlos; Arthur Nery; Janella Salvador; Tom Taus	—N/a	
March 24	Pulp Summer Slam	Amoranto Sports Complex	Quezon	Code Orange; Crypta; Fleshgod Apocalypse; La Dispute; Of Virtue; Parkway Drive; Rolling Quartz; Story of the Year	First Pulp Summer Slam since the impacts of the COVID-19 pandemic in the country.	
April 6	Sundown Lifestyle Fest	Metrotent	Pasig	INOJ; Salbakuta	—N/a	
April 6–7	Aurora Music Festival - Clark	Clark Global City	Angeles	Adie; Andrew E.; Rico Blanco; December Avenue; Moira Dela Torre; The Itchyworms; Juan Karlos; Kamikazee; Orange and Lemons; Parokya Ni Edgar; SB19	Part of the Aurora Music Festival series.	
April 20	Maligaya Summer Blast 2024	Philippine Arena	Bocaue	Angela Ken; Rico Blanco; Nobita; Rocksteddy; Zack Tabudlo; Zild	Part of the Maligaya Summer Blast annual series.	
April 26–May 3	Boracay Music Festival 2024	Epic Boracay	Malay	Various DJs	—N/a	
April 27	R-18 Main Character Era	Filinvest City Event Grounds	Muntinlupa	The Juans; Nobita; Quest; Sud	—N/a	
May 3–4	Bicol Loco Music Festival	Legazpi Airport	Legazpi	Bamboo; Ely Buendia; Sarah Geronimo; Jericho Rosales	—N/a	
May 4	Circus Music Festival 4	Circuit Makati	Makati	Bandang Lapis; Janine Berdin; Acel Bisa; Rico Blanco; December Avenue; Moira Dela Torre; Flow G; Gloc-9; Hale; I Belong to the Zoo; The Itchyworms; MOJOFLY; Arthur Nery; Nina; Orange and Lemons; Pablo; Sud	Part of the Circus Music Festival series.	
May 4	Castaway Music Festival 2024	SM City Pampanga	San Fernando	Mayonnaise; Silent Sanctuary; This Band	Part of the Castaway Music Festival series.	
May 10	Project Horizon Music Festival	McKinley Whiskey Park	Taguig	Various DJs	—N/a	
May 11	KWave Music Festival Philippines	Burnham Green Park, Quirino Grandstand	Manila	The Boyz; Fromis 9; KAIA; YGIG	—N/a	
May 18	KFC Kentucky Town Music and Arts Festival	Mall of Asia Concert Grounds	Pasay	Adie; Alamat; Juan Karlos; KAIA; Nobita; Parokya Ni Edgar; Zack Tabudlo	—N/a	
May 31–June 1	Summerfrolic: Future Dance	La-Ne's Kalapyahan	Mati	Various DJs	—N/a	
June 15	Out, Loud and Proud Drag Pride Fiesta 2024	Filinvest City Event Grounds	Muntinlupa	Various drag queens	—N/a	
June 15–16	Malaya Music Festival	Okada Manila	Parañaque	Gloc9; Hale; Mayonnaise; Parokya Ni Edgar; Sponge Cola; Sud; This Band	—N/a	
June 16	Wacken Metal Battle Philippines	Metrotent Convention Center	Pasig	Annalynn; Down for Life; Greyhoundz; Piledriver; Sable Hills	—N/a	
June 21	Fête de la Musique Philippines 2024	Greenbelt 3	Makati	Autotelic; Dilaw; Sinosikat?	—N/a	
June 21	Fête de la Musique Philippines 2024	Various venues	Various locations (El Nido, Cebu, Davao)	Various artists	—N/a	
June 22	Pride PH Festival 2024: Love Laban 2 Everyone	Quezon Memorial Circle	Quezon	Janine Berdin; BINI; Elijah Canlas; Nicole Cordoves; G22; Juan Karlos; Marina Summers; Vice Ganda; Viñas DeLuxe	Eventually paused, then cancelled due to inclement weather.	
June 28	Fête de la Musique Philippines 2024	Various venues	Makati	Various artists	—N/a	
June 29	Fête de la Musique Philippines 2024	Various venues	Various locations	Various artists	—N/a	
July 6	Love Cebu Music Festival	Waterfront Hotel & Casino	Cebu	Juan Karlos; Janine Berdin; Various local artists/bands from Cebu	—N/a	
August 24	Hydro Manila Music Festival	Bridgetowne Concert Grounds	Pasig	Ben&Ben; Al James; Dionela; Josh Cullen; Laidback Luke; Maki; Arthur Nery; James Reid	—N/a	
September 22	G Fest 2024 - Metro Manila	SMX Convention Center Manila	Pasay	Bini; SunKissed Lola; Other various artists	Part of the G Fest series by Globe Telecom.	
September 28	Circus Music Festival 5	Bridgetowne Concert Grounds	Pasig	Brownman Revival; Ely Buendia; Cueshé; The Dawn; December Avenue; Dionela; Gloc-9; Hale; Join the Club; Elmo Magalona; Munimuni; Nobita; Orange and Lemons; Parokya Ni Edgar; Rocksteddy; Silent Sanctuary; Sponge Cola; This Band	Part of the Circus Music Festival series.	
October 5	G Fest 2024 - Iloilo	Iloilo Convention Center	Iloilo	I Belong to the Zoo; Other various artists	Part of the G Fest series by Globe Telecom.	
October 12–13	ASIYA Fest 2024	World Trade Center Metro Manila	Pasay	9m88; Balming Tiger; Colde; Hyukoh; Imase; Shye; Sunset Rollercoaster	—N/a	
October 26	Horizon Halloween Festival	Bridgetowne Concert Grounds	Pasig	Jonas Blue; Various DJs	—N/a	
November 15–16	Pinoy Playlist Music Festival 2024	BGC Arts Center	Taguig	Various artists	The November 17 schedule was cancelled as a precaution due to weather conditions brought by Typhoon Man-yi	
November 25	G Fest 2024 - Davao	SMX Convention Center Davao	Davao	Angela Ken; Maki; Other various artists	Part of the G Fest series by Globe Telecom.	
November 29	Gabi Na Naman Year-End Party 2024	123 Block, Mandala Park	Mandaluyong	Dicta License; Bullet Dumas; Ena Mori; Munimuni; Other various artists	The event is also part of the JDOS Playlist LIVE series.	
November 30	Aurora Music Festival - Davao	Crocodile Park Concert Grounds	Davao	Ely Buendia; Cup of Joe; Moira Dela Torre; Arthur Nery; Orange and Lemons	Part of the Aurora Music Festival series.	
November 30	Hydro La Union: The Takeover	Poro Point	San Fernando	Flow G; Gloc-9; Hev Abi; Join the Club; Mayonnaise	—N/a	
December 7	Howlers Manila 3.0	CCP Open Grounds	Pasay	Rico Blanco; Kaye Cal; Flow G; G22; Maki; Press Hit Play; James Reid; Travie McCoy	—N/a	
December 14	JBL Sound Fest 2024	Mall of Asia Concert Grounds	Pasay	The Dawn; Hori7on; Over October; SB19; Zack Tabudlo	—N/a	
December 15	BLACKOUT: The Kickoff	Bridgetowne Concert Grounds	Pasig	Various artists; Various DJs	—N/a	
December 20	Maskipaps: the Crossover 2024	Sunken Garden, University of the Philippines Diliman	Quezon	Gloc-9; Parokya ni Edgar; Zild; Other various artists	—N/a	
December 21	2024 MMFF Music Festival	Manila Central Post Office	Manila	Bamboo; Klarisse de Guzman; Sheryn Regis	—N/a	
December 29	Philippine K-Pop Convention 12	Space at One Ayala	Makati	1st.One; Kaia	—N/a	

=== Cancelled/postponed shows ===
Scheduled date(s)	Headliner(s)	Venue	City	Event / Tour	Note(s)	Ref(s)
January 24	Junny	Club HYPE	Quezon	Blanc	Cancelled due to a health concern.	
March 2	Rowoon	Araneta Coliseum	Quezon	An Ordinary Day	Cancelled due to local circumstances.	
March 13	Rod Stewart	Mall of Asia Arena	Pasay	Rod Stewart: One Last Time	Cancelled due to unforeseen circumstances.	
March 15–17	Dilaw; Jazzanova (DJ set)	Malasimbo Amphitheater	Puerto Galera	Malasimbo Music and Arts Festival	Postponed due to logistic issues. Would have been the festival's first iteration since 2020.	
April 1	Corey Taylor	New Frontier Theater	Quezon	Corey Taylor Live	Cancelled due to a health concern.	
April 19	Janella Salvador	New Frontier Theater	Quezon	Janella: Reimagined	Postponed due to unforeseen circumstances.	
May 10–11	This Band	Waves Point Restobar	San Juan, La Union	Summer Splash Festival	Postponed due to extreme heat conditions.	
May 23	Nick Carter	Waterfront Hotel & Casino	Cebu	Who I Am 2024 Tour	Cancelled due to unforeseen circumstances.	
May 24	Nick Carter	New Frontier Theater	Quezon	Who I Am 2024 Tour	Cancelled due to unforeseen circumstances.	
July 24	Teddy Swims	The Podium Hall	Mandaluyong	I've Tried Everything But Therapy Tour	Cancelled due to the southwest monsoon enhanced by Typhoon Gaemi (Carina).	
September 4	Doyoung	Araneta Coliseum	Quezon	Dear Youth	Cancelled due to unforeseen circumstances.	
September 21	Various P-pop groups	New Frontier Theater	Quezon	One Music Revolution	Postponed due to unforeseen circumstances; rescheduled to a later date.	
December 7	Jon Santos	Samsung Hall – SM Aura Premier	Taguig	Naughty and Nice	Postponed due to unforeseen circumstances. With special guests Apo Hiking Society, Ice Seguerra, and drag artist Viñas DeLuxe.	
December 15	LOVER	New Frontier Theater	Quezon	Lover: An Eras Tour Experience	Cancelled due to unforeseen circumstances.	

== Deaths ==
- January 12 – Hansen Nichols (b. 1983), former contestant of Pinoy Dream Academy
- March 12 – Ernesto Dela Peña (b. 1932), composer
- April 10 – Tito Mina, singer
- May 6 – Esteve "Inozent One" Bohol (b. 1981), rapper
- July 31 – Carmen Pateña (b. 1941), singer
- August 6 – Mike Garape (b. 1981), former lead vocalist of Kala
- August 18 – Angel "Conrado" Sangalang, singer, The Miss Tres
- August 20 – Carlos Jose "CJ the DJ" Rivera (b. 1980), radio disk jockey (Magic 89.9)
- September 27 – Socorro "Coritha" Avelino (b. 1951), folk singer
- October 12 – Gilopez Kabayao (b. 1930), violinist
- November 18 – Mercy Sunot (b. 1976), vocalist, Aegis
