= Ely Buendia discography =

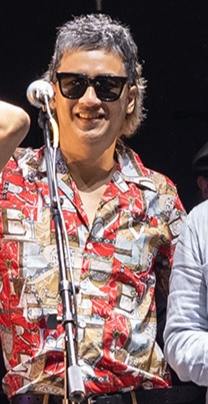
- Buendia at the SMDC Festival Grounds in 2022
- Studio albums: 2
- Singles: 18
- Music videos: 14
- Collaboration albums: 1

The solo discography of Filipino musician Ely Buendia consists of two studio albums, one collaboration album, one remix album, and eighteen singles. Most of his work is either released by Offshore Music (which is run by Buendia), BMG Records, or Sony Music.

Since the early 2000s, Buendia began recording as a solo artist outside of Eraserheads with his debut album Wanted Bedspacer (2000), followed by his second album Method Adaptor in 2024. Aside from forming the bands The Mongols, Pupil, The Oktaves, and Apartel, Buendia has collaborated with Francis M. on the album In Love and War (2010), as well as Itchyworms and Cheats.

== Albums ==
=== Studio albums ===
Title	Album details
Wanted Bedspacer	Released: December 21, 2000; Label: Musiko Records, BMG Records (Pilipinas) Inc.; Format: CD, cassette
Method Adaptor	Released: November 8, 2024; Label: Sony Music Philippines, Offshore Music; Format: CD, digital download, streaming

=== Collaborative albums ===
Title	Album details
In Love and War (with Francis Magalona)	Released: May 25, 2010; Label: Sony Music; Format: CD

=== Remix albums ===
Title	Album details
Method Adaptor Remixed	Released: April 30, 2025; Label: Offshore Music; Format: digital download, streaming

== Singles ==
=== As lead artist ===
List of singles, showing year released and album name
Title	Year	Album
"Wanted: Bedspacer"	2000	Wanted Bedspacer
"Santo"	2000	Wanted Bedspacer
"Higante"	2009	In Love and War (with Francis Magalona)
"Bus Stop"	2010	In Love and War (with Francis Magalona)
"Wasak Waltz"	2010	In Love and War (with Francis Magalona)
"Tayo'y Mga Pinoy" (Ely Buendia, Rico Blanco, Raimund Marasigan and Barbie Almalbis)	2013	Non-album single
"Haunted"	2013	Bang Bang Alley (Original Motion Picture Soundtrack)
"Pariwara" (Ely Buendia & The Itchyworms)	2016	Pariwara Lutang
"Lutang" (Ely Buendia & The Itchyworms)	2017	Pariwara Lutang
"Gabi Man, May Araw Din"	2017	Non-album single
"Grizzly Pool" (Ely Buendia and Cheats)	2019	Non-album single
"Malinaw Na Malabo Na Tayo" (Ely Buendia & The Itchyworms)	2019	Offshore Music, Vol. 2
"Plunder My Heart" (Ely Buendia and Cheats)	2020	Non-album single
"Metro"	2021	Non-album single
"Bulaklak Sa Buwan"	2024	Method Adaptor
"Tagpi-Tagping Piraso"	2024	Method Adaptor
"Kandarapa"	2024	Method Adaptor
"Ate"	2026	Non-album single

=== As featured artist ===
List of singles, showing year released and album name
Title	Year	Album
"Superproxy 2K6" (Francis M. with Hardware Syndrome featuring Ely Buendia)	2005	Ultraelectromagneticjam!: The Music of the Eraserheads
"360" (Carissa featuring Ely Buendia)	2022	Non-album single
"C U" (Sansette featuring Ely Buendia)	2022	Non-album single
"Habulan" (Pinkmen featuring Ely Buendia)	2023	Non-album single

== Other appearances ==
Title	Year	Album
"Unstrung Heroes" (Francis M. featuring Ely Buendia)	1996	Happy Battle
"Suntok sa Buwan"	2000	Kailangan Ko'y Ikaw (The Original Soundtrack)
"Ang Huling El Bimbo" (FILharmoniKA featuring Ely Buendia)	2008	Kumpas: An Orchestral Celebration of Pinoy Rock Music
"Bungo sa Bangin"	2010	Rock Rizal
"Minsan" (with Raimund Marasigan)	2012	Ang Nawawalang Soundtrack
"Getaway" (Vagabonds featuring Ely Buendia)	2015	Suburban Serenade

== Music videos ==
Year	Title	Director
2005	"Superproxy 2K6" (Francis M. with Hardware Syndrome featuring Ely Buendia)	
2009	"Higante" (Francis M. featuring Ely Buendia)	Manie Magbanua Jr.
2010	"Wasak Waltz" (Francis M. featuring Ely Buendia)	Jason Tan
2013	"Tayo'y Mga Pinoy" (Ely Buendia, Rico Blanco, Barbie Almalbis, and Raimund Marasigan)	
2013	"Haunted"	Samantha Lee
2016	"Pariwara" (Ely Buendia and the Itchyworms)	Maui Mauricio
2017	"Lutang" (Ely Buendia and the Itchyworms)	Audry Dionisio
2017	"Gabi Man, May Araw Din"	Adrian Arcega
2021	"Metro"	
2022	"360" (Carissa featuring Ely Buendia)	Anjo dela Cruz
2024	"Bulaklak sa Buwan"	Niko Cezar and Aimee Aznar
2024	"Tagpi-Tagping Piraso"	August Lyle Espino
2025	"Kandarapa"	Gada Nyssa Zayco
2026	”Kontrabando”	Bert Sulat Jr.
2026	"Ate"	
