= Ely Buendia =

Filipino musician (born 1970)

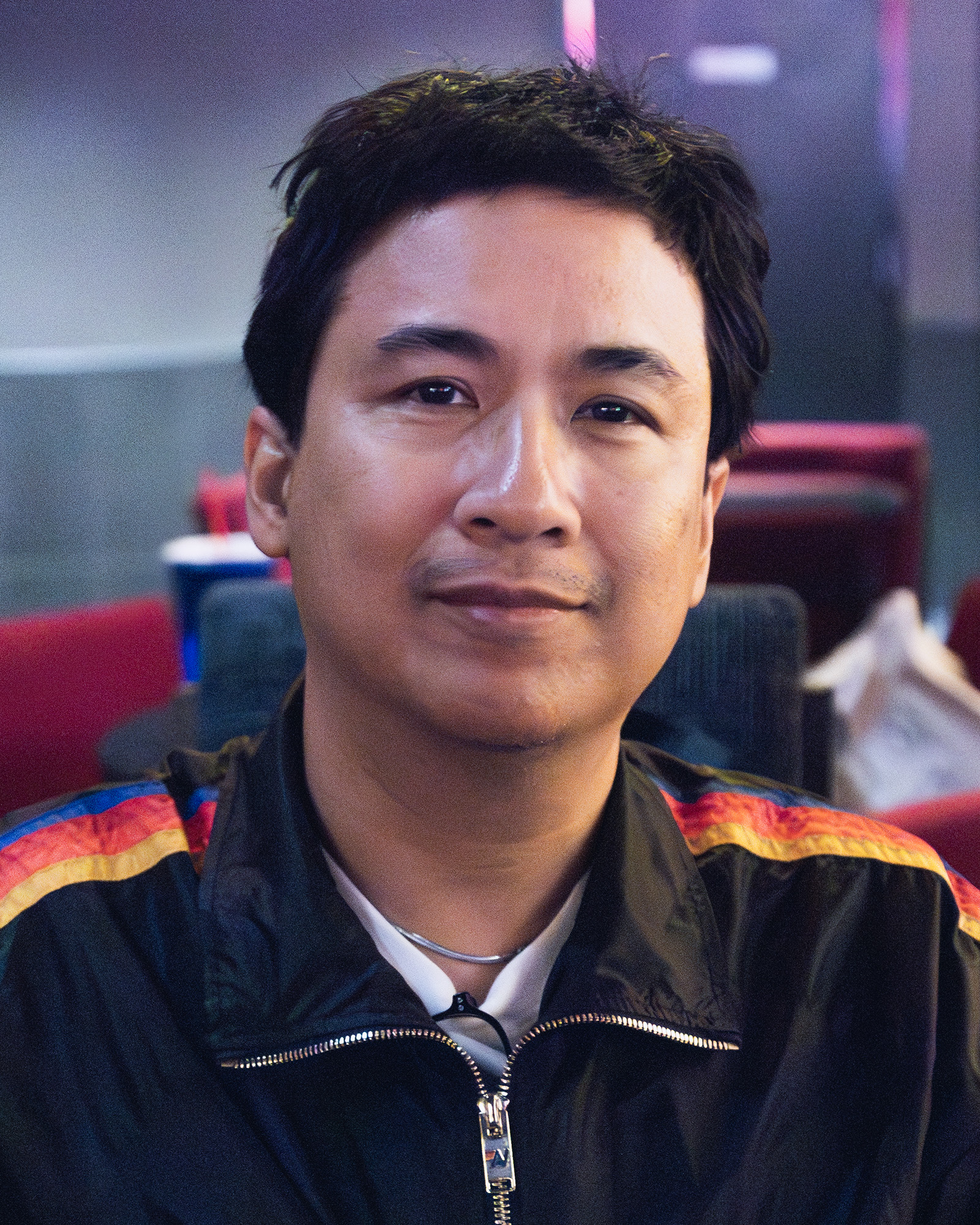
- Buendia in 2026
- Born: Ely Eleandre Basiño Buendia; November 2, 1970 (age 55); Naga, Camarines Sur, Philippines
- Other name: Jesus "Dizzy" Ventura
- Education: University of the Philippines Diliman (dropped out)
- Occupations: Singer; songwriter; musician; record producer; film director
- Years active: 1989–present
- Works: Discography
- Spouses: Vicky Cayago (annulled) Maria Diane Ventura ()
- Children: 2
- Musical career
- Genres: Alternative rock; pop; experimental; soul
- Instruments: Vocals; guitar; keyboards; synthesizer; drums; bass
- Labels: Sony BMG; MCA Music; Sony Music Philippines; Offshore Music
- Member of: Eraserheads; Pupil; Apartel
- Formerly of: The Mongols; The Oktaves

Ely Eleandre Basiño Buendia (Tagalog pronunciation: ['ɛli bwɛn'dijɐ]; born November 2, 1970) is a Filipino musician. He is best known as the lead vocalist and primary songwriter of the alternative rock band Eraserheads, with whom he has released seven albums since their founding in 1989.

Raised in Naga, Camarines Sur, Buendia attended University of the Philippines Diliman in Quezon City, where he met drummer Raimund Marasigan, bassist Buddy Zabala, and guitarist Marcus Adoro, with whom he would later form Eraserheads. Their debut album Ultraelectromagneticpop! (1993) ushered in a second wave of Philippine rock bands, and launched Buendia and the band to rock stardom. Buendia was the primary songwriter and creative voice behind the band's early albums, including Ultraelectromagneticpop!, Circus (1994) and Cutterpillow (1995). After releasing the Christmas concept album Fruitcake (1996), the band experimented with electronic and art rock styles for their next albums Sticker Happy (1997), Natin99 (1999), and Carbon Stereoxide (2001). Buendia left Eraserheads in 2002 and the band broke up soon after. They reunited in 2008 and have since made sporadic touring and promotional appearances in the country and overseas.

Buendia released his debut solo studio album, Wanted Bedspacer, in 2000. After leaving Eraserheads, he became lead vocalist for the bands The Mongols, Pupil, The Oktaves, and Apartel. Buendia collaborated with rapper Francis M. on the album In Love and War, posthumously released in 2010 after the latter's death. He has also collaborated with Itchyworms and Cheats. Buendia founded the independent record label Offshore Music in 2016, which has represented artists Ena Mori, Pinkmen and Sansette. Buendia released his second solo album, Method Adaptor, in 2024.

== Early life ==
Ely Eleandre Basiño Buendia was born in Naga, Camarines Sur on November 2, 1970. He is the second child of Ely Revilla Buendia and Lisetta Ruiz Basiño. Buendia attended preparatory school in Naga Parochial School and finished his elementary grades at Pasig Catholic College in Pasig City in 1983, and high school at University of Perpetual Help in Rizal.

Buendia had a complicated relationship with his father, later writing the songs "Poorman's Grave" and "Acid Tongue" about him. He also wrote his first song "The Junction" after hearing Michael Jackson's album Off the Wall on cassette, getting as far as the chorus. Buendia wrote his first proper song "Unstrung Heroes" at the age of 14, which he later recorded with rapper Francis M. for his 1996 album Happy Battle. He grew up listening to Rico J. Puno, Diomedes Maturan, Elvis, Bob Dylan, and the Beatles.

Buendia attended college at University of the Philippines Diliman. He played bass for the college band Bluidie Tryste in 1987, which had Raymund dela Peña on vocals. They debuted at a protest rally, covering "Boys Don't Cry" by The Cure. The following year, Buendia and dela Peña held auditions for a new band, of which freshman Raimund Marasigan responded. He invited his fellow freshmen Buddy Zabala and Marcus Adoro for a jam session at Alberto's rehearsal studio in Cubao, but nothing materialized. Buendia and dela Peña later formed a new band called Sunday School, which focused on new wave and had session drummers including Marasigan. Dela Peña eventually left the band to pursue jazz, leading Marasigan to bring in Zabala and Adoro from his own band Curfew. Marasigan and Buendia combined Sunday School and Curfew into a new band, which they named Eraserheads after the David Lynch film.

== Career ==
=== Eraserheads ===
The band played at campus events, usually as the crowd started to leave. In January 1991, they recorded a nine-song demo tape at Marasigan's garage in Candelaria, Quezon and shopped it around record labels, clubs, and radio stations only to be met with rejection; one record label commented that the demos were "not pop enough". Marasigan gave a copy of the demo tape to his humanities professor Robin Rivera, who helped them re-record and mix better versions of the demos. The new demo tape was named Pop-U! as an irreverent response to those who turned them down. It earned the band a spot at Club Dredd, where they initially had little success playing covers. They decided to write their own material which soon earned them a cult following. One song written by Buendia, "Pare Ko", became popular for its explicit lyrics. The band soon landed an out-of-town gig opening for Introvoys in Cebu. Buendia wrote "Combo on the Run" based on their experiences there.

Buendia, who majored in mass communication with a degree in film at UP, sold Bicol express to his dorm mates to earn money, but later dropped out. He worked at BMG as a copywriter while writing songs with his band members at night. Their material later caught the attention of A&R director Vic Valenciano, who commented that they were technically very raw but that there was something promising in them. The band signed a three-year deal with BMG and recorded their debut album Ultraelectromagneticpop!, which was later released in 1993. With the single "Pare Ko", Eraserheads quickly entered the mainstream.

Buendia continued to write songs for the band, many of which became classic hits. The band released seven studio albums and a compilation album for the Southeast Asian region. In 1997, they received MTV Asia's Viewer's Choice Award at the MTV Video Music Awards in New York City for their music video for "Ang Huling El Bimbo", the only Philippine artist to have received the award. Buendia had written the song: "I had a huge crush on this girl who was older; she was the one who taught me the dance, and I think that was the first time I was really in love with a girl. Then I never saw her again."

Buendia later grew ambivalent about the band's success. In an interview promoting Natin99, he revealed that he suffered from insecurity: "I realized too late that maybe I wasn't ready for it. I felt the pressure as lead singer and songwriter. I was always stressed." He also contended with audience expectations as the band started to experiment with their music, later writing "Para sa Masa" in response. "We could have done another Cutterpillow that would have been even more popular," he said in another interview. "But after I saw 20,000-plus people at the Sunken Garden, naisip ko, 'Paano pa natin masusundan 'yon?' Obvious na 'yun ang gusto ng masa, 'yung ganoong tunog. Siyempre, kung ano ang gusto, 'yun ang hindi namin ginawa (How do you follow up something like that? Obviously that's what the masses want, that sound, and of course that's not what we did)."

Buendia left Eraserheads in March 2002. In an interview, Adoro revealed that Buendia sent a cryptic text message to his band members that "it's graduation time", referring to him being a year ahead of them at UP. Buendia later recalled in a podcast interview in 2021: "We had a very, very good working relationship. It’s just that I don’t like it when people say that it was the wrong way to go, ‘yung dynamics within the band." The remaining three members later debuted with new vocalist, Kris Gorra-Dancel of Fatal Posporos, in April. Adoro left the band in November, and the band was dissolved soon after.

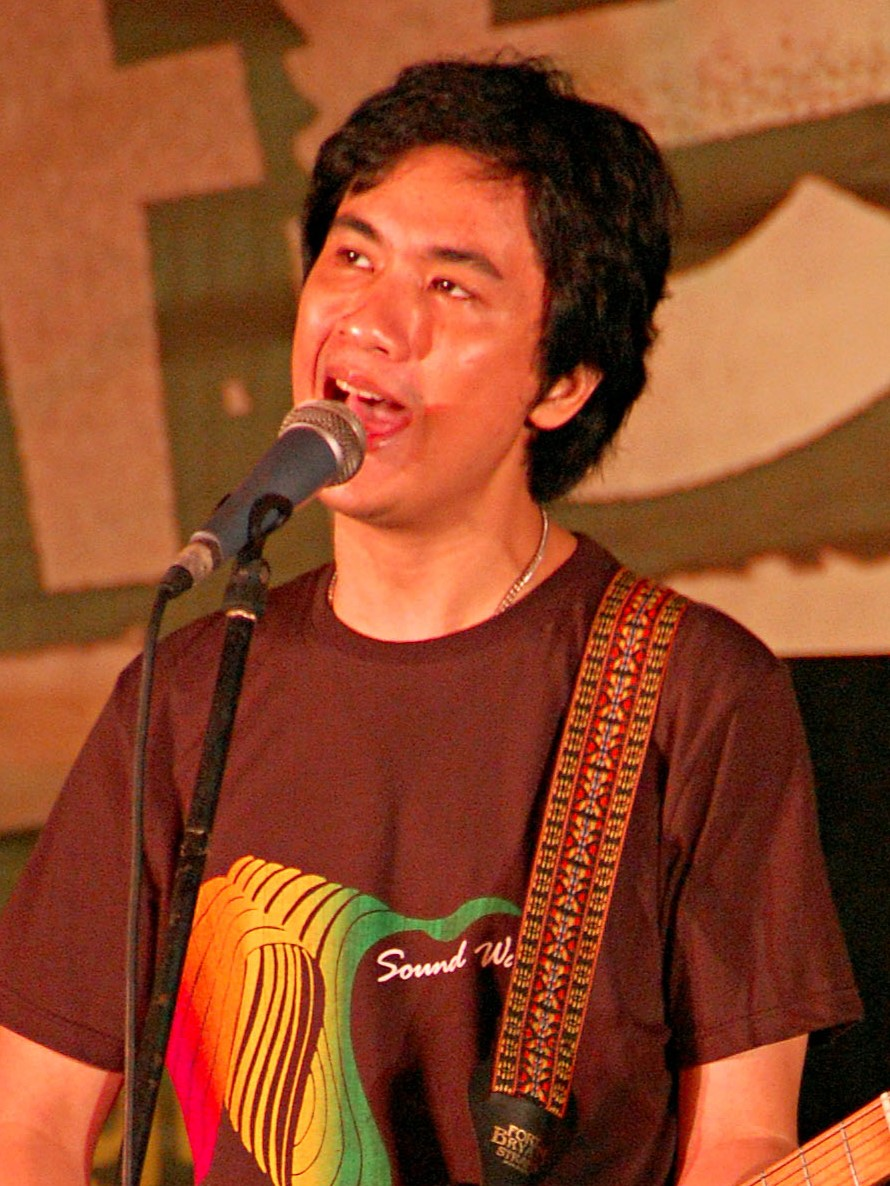
Buendia in 2008

The band reunited for a concert in August 2008, which was cut short after Buendia experienced chest pains and was rushed to the hospital. After recovering from an angioplasty, he later returned to the stage for a second reunion concert in March 2009. The band embarked on a world tour between 2012 and 2014, later releasing two new songs, "Sabado" and "1995" (co-written by Buendia), for Esquire magazine. They appeared in a promotional campaign for Smart Communications in 2016. In December 2022, the band held their third reunion concert in the Philippines, and embarked on another world tour from 2023 to 2025.

=== The Mongols ===
After leaving Eraserheads, Buendia formed the underground band the Mongols under the stage name Jesus "Dizzy" Ventura. The band consisted of Buendia as lead vocalist, Jerome Velasco of Teeth on guitars, Yanni Yuzon on bass, and Bogs Jugo of Daydream Cycle on drums. They released a promotional EP A Fraction of a Second, followed by the self-produced studio album Buddha's Pest, which was released by Viva Records in 2003.

When Velasco left the Mongols in 2005 to study in the US, the rest of the band added Dok Sergio to the lineup and changed their name to Pupil.

=== Pupil ===
Pupil released their debut album Beautiful Machines in 2005. Jugo left soon after and was replaced by Wendell Garcia of Barbie's Cradle. The band released their second album Wild Life in 2007. Their third studio album, Limiters of the Infinity Pool, was released in 2011, after which Yuzon left the band in 2013. Velasco joined the band in 2014 after having produced Wild Life. They released their fourth studio album Zilch in 2015.

=== The Oktaves ===
In 2011, Buendia formed the supergroup The Oktaves with The Jerks guitarist Nitoy Adriano and members of Hilera. They released a self-titled album in 2013, featuring the singles "K.U.P.A.L" and "Paakyat Ka Pa Lang, Pababa Na Ako".

=== Apartel ===
In 2016, Buendia formed the soul and R&B supergroup Apartel with Gnash and DRT frontman Jay Ortega. The band's current lineup includes Buendia, guitarist Redge Concepcion, bassist Jun Lazo, drummer Pat Sarabia, percussionist Deej Rodriguez, and a changing lineup of touring members. Ortega left the group in 2017.

Apartel released their debut album, Inner Play, through Buendia's record label Offshore Music in 2016. It was followed by Full Flood in 2018.

=== Solo projects ===
In 2000, Buendia released his debut solo album Wanted Bedspacer. It featured an electronica sound in contrast to his work with Eraserheads, especially in songs such as lead single "Santo" and "Kakaiba".

While studying film at UP, Buendia worked as an intern for Lino Brocka and Ishmael Bernal's film and TV productions. He later pursued a film career after leaving Eraserheads. Buendia had previously co-directed music videos for Eraserheads songs "With a Smile" and "Maskara" and later directed music videos for Kaya and The Oktaves. Buendia eventually wrote and directed the short film Waiting Shed, produced by Tikoy Aguiluz for Cinemanila. Starring Buendia's then-partner Maria Diane Ventura, it was screened in 2009 by Cinemanila's Sine Barangay alongside former bandmate Marcus Adoro's short film The Artist Is In.

In 2013, Buendia co-directed the crime anthology film Bang Bang Alley with King Palisoc and Zig Marasigan. He wrote and directed the title segment and the final episode "Pusakal". He also wrote and performed the song "Haunted" as its theme song.

In 2017, Buendia released "Gabi Man, May Araw Din", his first solo release in 17 years. It was used as the theme song to the indie film Ang Pamilyang Hindi Lumuluha starring Sharon Cuneta. In the same year, Buendia pitched a feature screenplay titled Kontrata with producer Pam Reyes to the Cinemalaya-DGPI Filmpitch.

Buendia released the song "Metro" in 2021 as part of We Need a Leader, a voter awareness campaign for the 2022 Philippine presidential election. He later re-recorded a new version of the song in support of presidential candidate Leni Robredo and her running mate Kiko Pangilinan.

In August 2024, Buendia released the song "Bulaklak Sa Buwan" with an accompanying music video. It served as the lead single from his second solo album Method Adaptor, which was later released in November. It was followed by "Tagpi-Tagping Piraso", which was released in October. A remix album by various artists, Method Adaptor Remixed, was released in April 2025.

=== Collaborations ===
Buendia and rapper Francis M. first collaborated on the Eraserheads song "Superproxy" from the 1995 album Cutterpillow. They later re-recorded a new version titled "Superproxy 2K6" with Hardware Syndrome for the first Eraserheads tribute album Ultraelectromagneticjam!: The Music of the Eraserheads in 2005. They worked on the collaborative album In Love and War, featuring the single "Higante". It was posthumously released in 2010 after the rapper's death from leukemia.

In 2010, Buendia and Hilera collaborated on a Tagalog rendition of "La Paloma" as the theme song to the film Manila Kingpin: The Asiong Salonga Story. The following year, Buendia collaborated with The Jerks guitarist Nitoy Adriano, Sinosikat? vocalist Kat Agarrado, Turbo Goth member Sarah Gaugler, and drummer Pepe Smith on the song "Bungo sa Bangin" as part of Rock Rizal, a project by Rock Ed Philippines to commemorate Jose Rizal’s 150th birth anniversary. It was later re-recorded for The Oktaves’s debut album.

In 2012, Buendia and Marasigan re-recorded the Eraserheads song "Minsan" for the 2012 film Ang Nawawala. They also collaborated with Rico Blanco and Barbie Almalbis in 2013 on a cover of Heber Bartolome's "Tayo'y Mga Pinoy" for a promotional campaign for Smart Communications.

Buendia released a series of collaborations with Itchyworms. The first song, "Pariwara", was released in 2016, followed by "Lutang" in 2017 and "Malinaw na Malabo na Tayo" in 2019. "Pariwara" and "Lutang" were later released as a 7-inch single for Record Store Day by Offshore Music in 2017.

Buendia also collaborated with the indie rock band Cheats, having previously produced their self-titled debut album in 2016. The first song, "Grizzly Pool", was released in 2019. It was followed by "Plunder My Heart" in 2020.

Buendia collaborated with indie rock band Sansette on their song "C U" in 2022.

=== Offshore Music ===
In 2016, Buendia founded the independent record label Offshore Music. The label signed a partnership agreement with Sony Music Philippines in 2023, which includes global distribution, promotion of artists, and securing brand partnerships. The label also prioritizes releasing their catalogue on vinyl.

Offshore Music has signed artists such as Apartel, Itchyworms, Jun Lopito, The Ransom Collective, Eyedress, and Ena Mori. Buendia has also rereleased Eraserheads's first three albums on vinyl through the label.

== Personal life ==
=== Relationships ===
Buendia was first married to Vicky Cayago, with whom he has a daughter named Una Aurea. Buendia wrote the song "Toyang" about Cayago.

Buendia was later married to filmmaker Maria Diane Ventura, with whom he shares a son. Ventura directed the Eraserheads documentary Combo on the Run, released in 2025.

=== Politics ===
Buendia endorsed Leni Robredo in the 2022 Philippine presidential elections. He tweeted in 2021 that he would reunite with Eraserheads if Robredo ran for office, which he later dismissed as a "half serious joke". He appeared at a campaign rally in Iloilo in February 2022, where he performed Eraserheads songs.

=== Health issues ===
In January 2007, Buendia suffered a heart attack during a live show with Pupil. He underwent two angioplasty procedures.

During Eraserheads's reunion concert in August 2008, Buendia experienced chest pains and was rushed to Makati Medical Center. He recovered after a third angioplasty.

== Discography ==
Studio albums

- Wanted Bedspacer (2000)
- Method Adaptor (2024)

Collaborative albums

- In Love and War (2010; with Francis Magalona)

With Eraserheads

- Ultraelectromagneticpop! (1993)
- Circus (1994)
- Cutterpillow (1995)
- Fruitcake (1996)
- Sticker Happy (1997)
- Natin99 (1999)
- Carbon Stereoxide (2001)

With The Mongols

- Buddha's Pest (2003)

With Pupil

- Beautiful Machines (2005)
- Wild Life (2007)
- Limiters of the Infinity Pool (2011)
- Zilch (2015)

With The Oktaves

- The Oktaves (2013)

With Apartel

- Inner Play (2016)
- Full Flood (2018)

== Filmography ==
Film

Year	Title	Role	Notes
1995	Run Barbi Run	Himself	With Eraserheads
2008	Eraserheads: The Reunion Concert	Himself	Concert film
2008	Eraserheads Live! The Final Set	Himself	Concert film (TV special)
2010	Pop-U-Mentary	Himself	Collection of Eraserheads home videos edited by Marcus Adoro
2010	Waiting Shed	Director	Short film
2011	San Lazaro	Rex	Directed by Wincy Aquino Ong
2011	Rakenrol	Himself	Directed by Quark Henares
2011	Manila Kingpin: The Asiong Salonga Story	Band Lead Singer	Performed Tagalog rendition of "La Paloma" with Hilera
2014	Bang Bang Alley	Co-director	Directed two segments: "Bang Bang Alley" and "Pusakal"
2016	A Lullaby to the Sorrowful Mystery	Musikero	Directed by Lav Diaz
2016	Singing in Graveyards	Pepe's Son	Directed by Bradley Liew
2019	The Halt	Django	Directed by Lav Diaz
2025	Eraserheads: Combo on the Run	Himself	Documentary
2025	Padamlagan	Doring	Directed by Jenn Romano

Television

Year	Title	Role	Notes
1996	Oki Doki Doc	Mackie	Guest
2026–present	My Bespren Emman	Emman	Directed by Derick Cabrido and Jerome Pobocan
2026	Kopino		

== Awards and nominations ==
Award	Year	Category	Recipient(s)	Results	Ref.
Awit Awards	2024	Favorite Solo Artist	Ely Buendia	Nominated	
New Hue Video Music Awards	2025	Album of the Year	Method Adaptor	Won	
