= Buddha's Pest =

2003 studio album by The Mongols

Studio album by the Mongols
- Released: October 27, 2003
- Studio: Sound Image; Tracks Studios
- Genre: Rock; grunge
- Length: 50:05
- Label: Neo; Criminal
- Producer: the Genghis Klan

Singles from Buddha's Pest
- 1. "Bulakbol" Released: 2003; 2. "Bakit Nga Ba?" Released: 2004; 3. "Keeper" Released: 2004; 4. "Heroine" Released: 2005

Buddha's Pest is the only studio album by the Philippine underground band the Mongols, released on October 27, 2003, by Viva Records. It features Eraserheads vocalist Ely Buendia (credited as Jesus "Dizzy" Ventura), Teeth guitarist Jerome Velasco, bassist Yanni Yuzon and drummer Bogs Jugo. The title is a pun on the city of Budapest, Hungary.

== Background ==
Buendia had left Eraserheads in March 2002. He later organized live shows with his friends, playing covers of his previous band, Teeth, and The Velvet Underground. Meanwhile, Teeth had gone on hiatus in 2003 after their vocalist Glenn Jacinto migrated to the United States. Velasco later met Buendia and got together for informal jam sessions.

The band first performed in Davao in January 2003. They self-produced an EP, A Fraction of a Second, which they sold at their live shows.

== Music and lyrics ==
The album's influences include the Smashing Pumpkins, Dave Grohl, and R.E.M. Its songs feature distorted electric guitars, guitar feedback, and cryptic lyrics.

== Track listing ==
Buddha's Pest track listing
No.	Title	Writer(s)	Length
1.	"Keeper"	Ely Buendia; Jerome Velasco	3:39
2.	"Bulakbol"	Buendia	5:09
3.	"Bakit Nga Ba?"	Buendia; Velasco; Yanni Yuzon	3:58
4.	"Pony"	Yuzon; Bogs Jugo	4:43
5.	"Teka Muna"	Buendia; Diane Ventura	3:04
6.	"Candy Flip"	Buendia	3:37
7.	"Heroine"	Buendia; Jugo; Yuzon; Velasco	2:24
8.	"Wigout"	Buendia	4:12
9.	"It's Over"	Yuzon	4:06
10.	"Irish Spring"	Buendia	3:11
11.	"Odd Even"	Buendia	4:55
12.	"Your Bushido"	Buendia	7:07
Total length:			50:05

== Personnel ==
The Mongols

- Jesus "Dizzy" Ventura – vocals, guitars
- Yanni Yuzon – bass, vocals
- Jerome Velasco – guitars
- Bogs Jugo – drums

Additional musicians

- Diane Ventura – voice talent on "Satan Versus God" (track 7)
- Kevin – voice talent on "Satan Versus God" (track 7)

Production

- The Genghis Klan – producer
- Jay de las Alas – recording
- Dennis Roque – recording
- Angee Rozul – mixing, mastering

Design

- Ramon Mayor – photography
- Diane S. God – photography
- P. Mayor – sleeve design (Dissonance Media)
