= One Hit Wonder (film) =

- Official film poster
- Directed by: Marla Ancheta
- Written by: Marla Ancheta
- Starring: Sue Ramirez; Khalil Ramos; Vivoree Esclito; Romnick Sarmenta; Gladys Reyes; Lilet
- Music by: Paulo Zarate
- Production company: Lucid Dreams Creatives
- Distributed by: Netflix
- Release date: August 21, 2025
- Running time: 112 minutes
- Country: Philippines
- Languages: Filipino; Cebuano

One Hit Wonder is a 2025 Filipino romantic comedy jukebox musical film. It was produced by Lucid Dreams Creatives and premiered as a Netflix original on August 21, 2025. Written and directed by Marla Ancheta, the film stars Sue Ramirez and Khalil Ramos as aspiring musicians in the 1990s. The main cast also includes Vivoree Esclito, Romnick Sarmenta, Gladys Reyes, and Lilet. The characters in Wonder perform OPM songs from the time period such as "Ulan" (lit. 'Rain') by Rivermaya; the film also features music by Filipino bands like Neocolours and the Eraserheads in its soundtrack.

== Release ==
Netflix Philippines first announced One Hit Wonder in early 2025, sharing promotional stills for the film on Instagram. It premiered on Netflix on August 21.

== Plot ==
In 1984, a teenage girl named Lorina Dominguez sings on a rooftop, unaware that a boy named Entoy Mangarap is listening to her. He claps, which startles her, and quickly runs away before she can see who it is. Lorina participates in the finals of the Ang Bagong Kampeon singing contest, but is unable to sing onstage due to stage fright. Chona Velasquez wins. Ten years later, Lorina is now in her twenties, working at a record store and as a personal assistant to her cousin Jocelyn "Lyn-lyn" Alvarez, a teen pop star. Chona is now a successful singer known as Regine Velasquez.

Entoy appears again. It is revealed that he is in a band called Ang Banda Ni Tessa (lit. 'Tessa's Band') and has been painting Lorina from memory. He's surprised when he sees her for the first time in the record store, their first encounter in years. He tries to approach her a few times, to no avail. Although Lorina is distrustful at first, the two of them get to know each other after Entoy invites her to become a vocalist for the band so they can create a demo tape together and get airplay.

In the process, Lorina and Entoy fall in love and start dating. However, the band's tape still does not receive airplay, which strains the members' relationship with each other. Carmen calls Lorina to inform her that Lorina got into an American school. Lorina is also shaken when she witnesses fans swarming Lyn-lyn, injuring her. In the band's first performance with Lorina, she storms out. The band proceeds without her and secures a record deal.

Lorina and Entoy clash amid the band's newfound success. She tells him that she is going to study in the US. They break up. Before her flight to the US, the band's song "Ako'y Sa'yo, Ika'y Akin" (transl. I'm Yours, You're Mine) plays on the radio for the first time. On air, Entoy explains that the song was inspired by Lorina. She hears it, cries, and calls Entoy's father, Ben, asking him to tell Entoy to wait for her.

Several years pass. Ang Banda Ni Tessa is now successful. Ben dies at home and Entoy weeps after reading the letter Ben left behind. The film ends in 2002. Lyn-lyn is now an adult and has rebranded herself as "Jo-C," with a less cutesy image. As she promised, Lorina returns to the Philippines. At a Jo-C concert, Lorina and Entoy reconcile as Jo-C sings a cover of "Ako'y Sa'yo, Ika'y Akin" onstage.

== Production ==
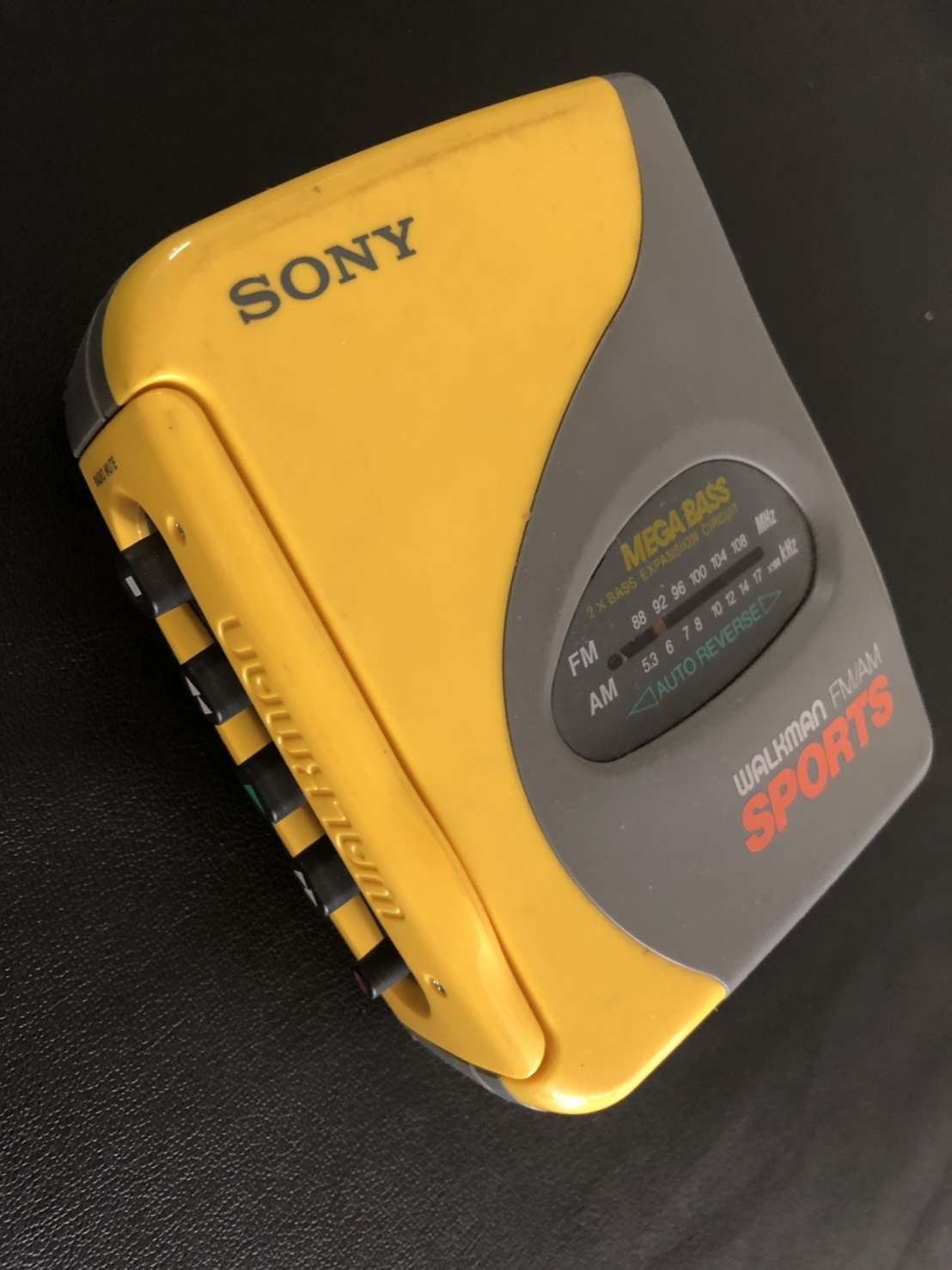
A Walkman from the 1990s

One Hit Wonder is a jukebox musical in which the characters perform OPM songs from the 1990s such as "Ulan" (lit. 'Rain') by Rivermaya, "Bakit Nga Ba Mahal Kita" (lit. 'Why Do I Love You') by Roselle Nava, and "Ako'y Sa'yo, Ika'y Akin" (lit. 'I'm Yours, You're Mine') by Iaxe. The soundtrack also features songs by 1990s bands like Introvoys, Yano, Color It Red, Ang Tunay na Amo, Neocolours, Teeth, Hungry Young Poets, and the Eraserheads. The film was written and directed by Marla Ancheta, with musical direction by Paulo Zarate. She decided to set the film in the 1990s because of her personal memories of the time period. She named "Ako'y Sayo, Ika'y Akin", which was released in 1994, as the plot's "emotional core". She drew inspiration from its songwriter John Bunda's past for the main character Lorina's story as well.

ABS-CBN News' Gretchen Fullido noted that the film "lovingly" recreates the 1990s by showing Walkmans, mixtapes, and landline telephones, in addition to its soundtrack. Nylon Manila's Rafael Bautista named Vivoree Esclito's character Jocelyn "Lyn-lyn" Alvarez as one of the "most notable" 1990s throwbacks in the film, observing that Jocelyn's look is heavily inspired by Jolina Magdangal's from the period. Although Wonder is marketed simply as a Filipino language film, &Asian's Julienne Loreto estimated that approximately a third of the film's dialogue is actually in Cebuano, which serves as a plot point in the narrative.

== Cast ==
Main cast of One Hit Wonder
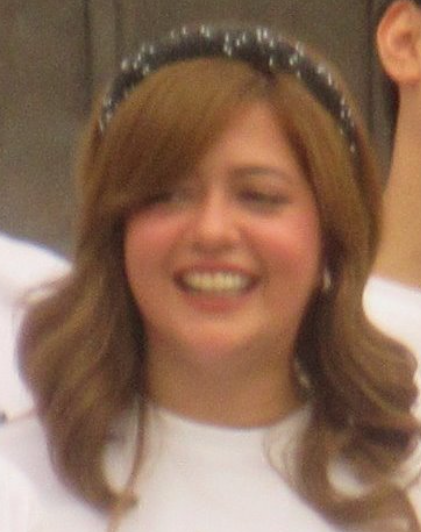
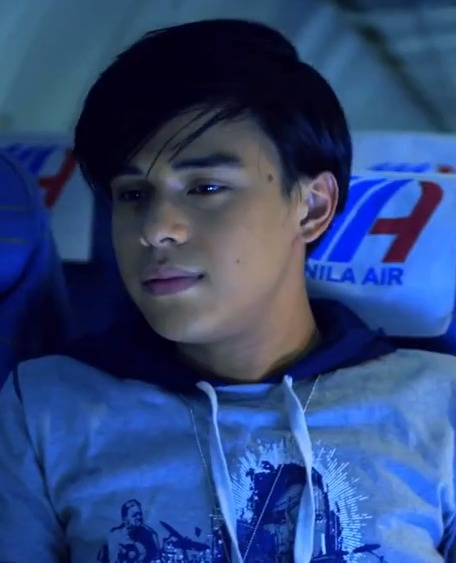
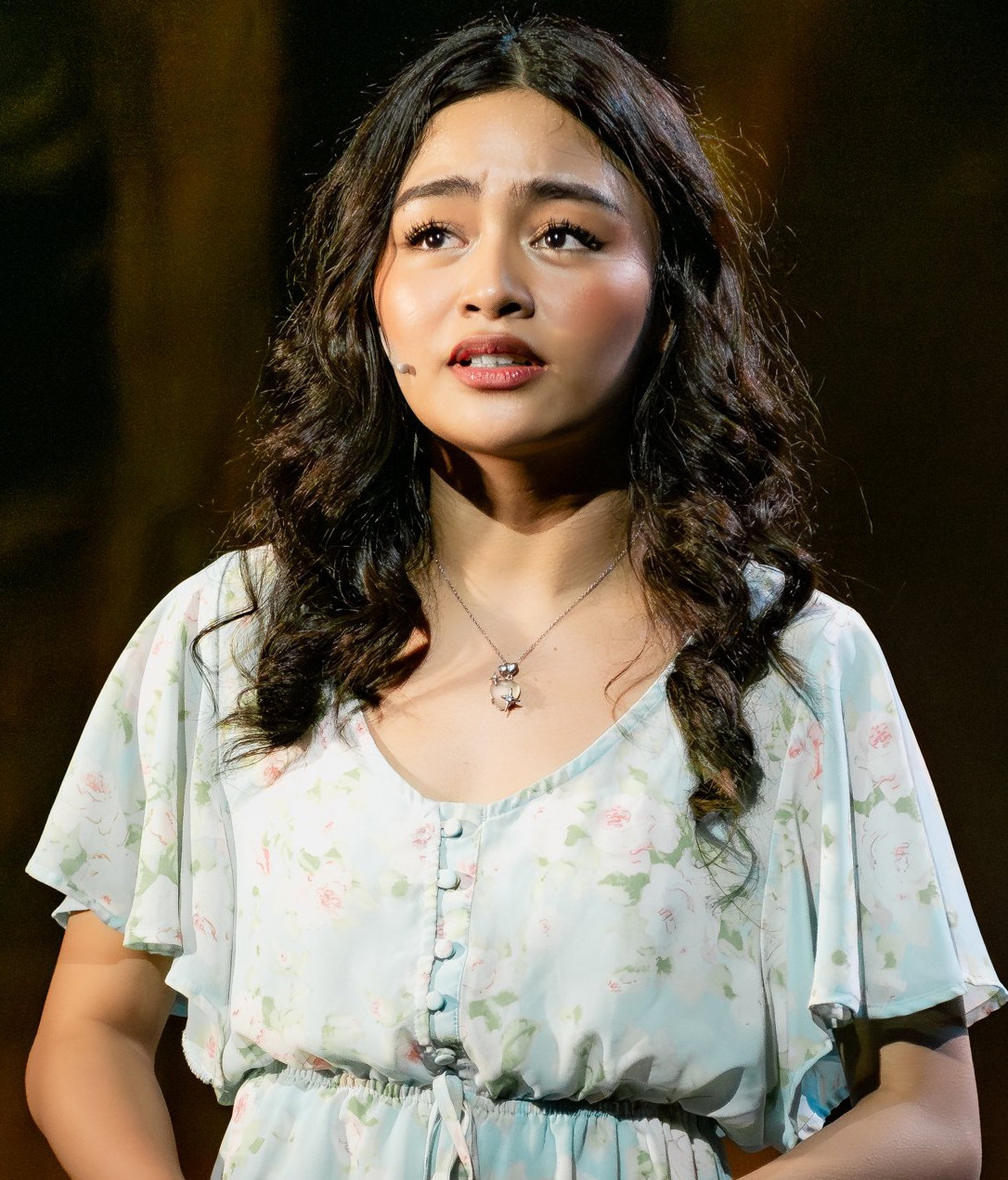
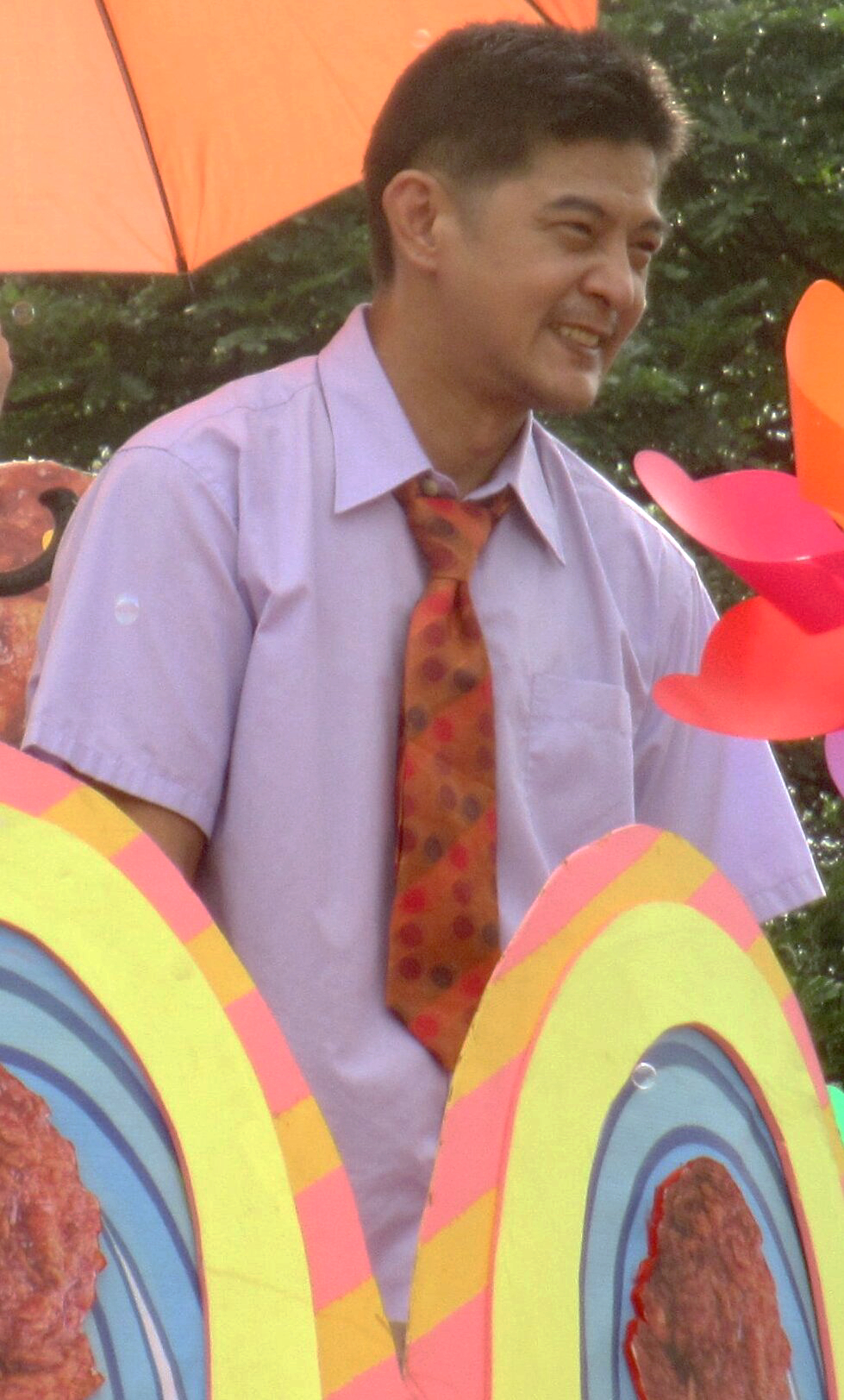
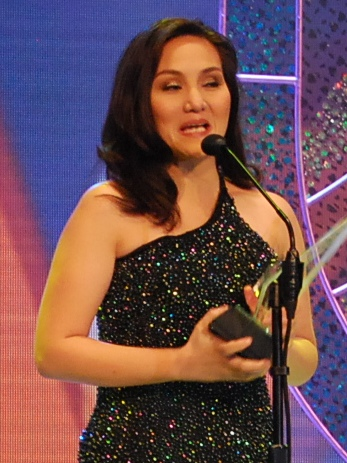
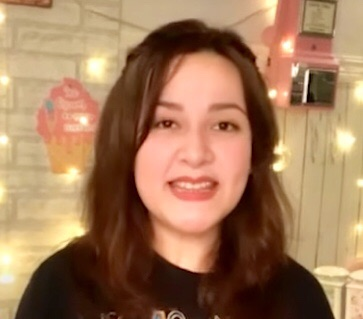
(Left to right) Sue Ramirez, Khalil Ramos, Vivoree Esclito, Romnick Sarmenta, Gladys Reyes, and Lilet
- Sue Ramirez as Lorina Dominguez, a young woman who lost a singing contest in 1984. She now works as a personal assistant to her cousin Jocelyn Alvarez, a pop star.
- Khalil Ramos as Entoy Mangarap, a fellow singer who encourages Lorina to pursue her dreams of being a musician again. He is the vocalist of Ang Banda Ni Tessa (lit. 'Tessa's Band'), which he named after his late mother.
- Vivoree Esclito as Jocelyn "Lyn-lyn/Jo-C" Alvarez, Lorina's cousin who is a rising teen pop star. Her look is heavily inspired by Jolina Magdangal's.
- Romnick Sarmenta as Ben, Entoy's father who is a Cebuano-speaking painter.
- Gladys Reyes as Ester, Lorina's aunt who has taken Lorina under her wing after her mother Carmen left to work in San Francisco in the United States.
- Lilet as Carmen, Lorina's mother who works as a caregiver in San Francisco.

The opening scene is a fictionalized depiction of Regine Velasquez' real-life win at the Ang Bagong Kampeon (lit. 'The New Champion') singing contest in 1984, in which Jackie Lou Blanco portrays her late mother Pilita Corrales. The film also features cameos from Filipino musicians who were popular in the 1990s, such as Dingdong Avanzado, Barbie Almalbis, Cooky Chua, Ito Rapadas, and Jay Durias.

== Reception ==
One Hit Wonder received mostly favorable reviews from Filipino critics, while foreign critics mostly gave it negative reviews.

Nathalie Tomada of The Philippine Star wrote that Wonder is "well-acted and tightly helmed", adding that it accurately portrays life in the Philippines in the 1990s. She also appreciated how the film emphasized Sue Ramirez' singing voice. Paul Emmanuel Enicola of The Movie Buff praised Ramirez' and Khalil Ramos' "natural musicality". He gave the film a C+ grade, praising its sincerity but criticizing its heavy-handed approach.

Common Sense Media's Barbara Shulgasser-Parker gave Wonder a highly negative review, writing that "no one will mistake One Hit Wonder for a great film or even a good one." She criticized what she perceived to be its lack of depth and realism, further describing Ramirez' and Ramos' singing voices as just "average". She gave the film two stars out of five. Ruchika Bhat of Digital Mafia Talkies said that she was excited by the opening scene of Ramirez singing, but found that the rest of the film failed to live up to its potential. However, she praised the musical numbers for being "very catchy and beautifully sung". She gave the film two and a half stars out of five. Anjali Sharma of the India-based pop culture site Midgard Times gave the film a mixed review, praising its charm but writing that the film was overall not so memorable. She gave it a rating of 6.5 out of 10.

== Soundtrack ==
Netflix released an official playlist containing all of the songs in One Hit Wonder's soundtrack.

1. "In Your Eyes" – George Benson
2. "To Love Again" – Sharon Cuneta
3. "Di Na Ko Aasa Pa" – Introvoys
4. "Will I Survive" – Introvoys
5. "Fix da World Up" – Mastaplann
6. "Kamusta Na?" – Yano
7. "Ulan" – Rivermaya
8. "Ligaya" – Eraserheads
9. "Bakit Nga Ba Mahal Kita" – Roselle Nava
10. "Ako'y Sa'yo, Ika'y Akin Lamang" – Iaxe
11. "Alapaap" – Eraserheads
12. "Torpe" – Hungry Young Poets
13. "Kahit Habang Buhay" – Smokey Mountain
14. "Prinsesa" – Teeth
15. "Say You'll Never Go" – Neocolours
