= Maria Diane Ventura =

Filipino-American filmmaker

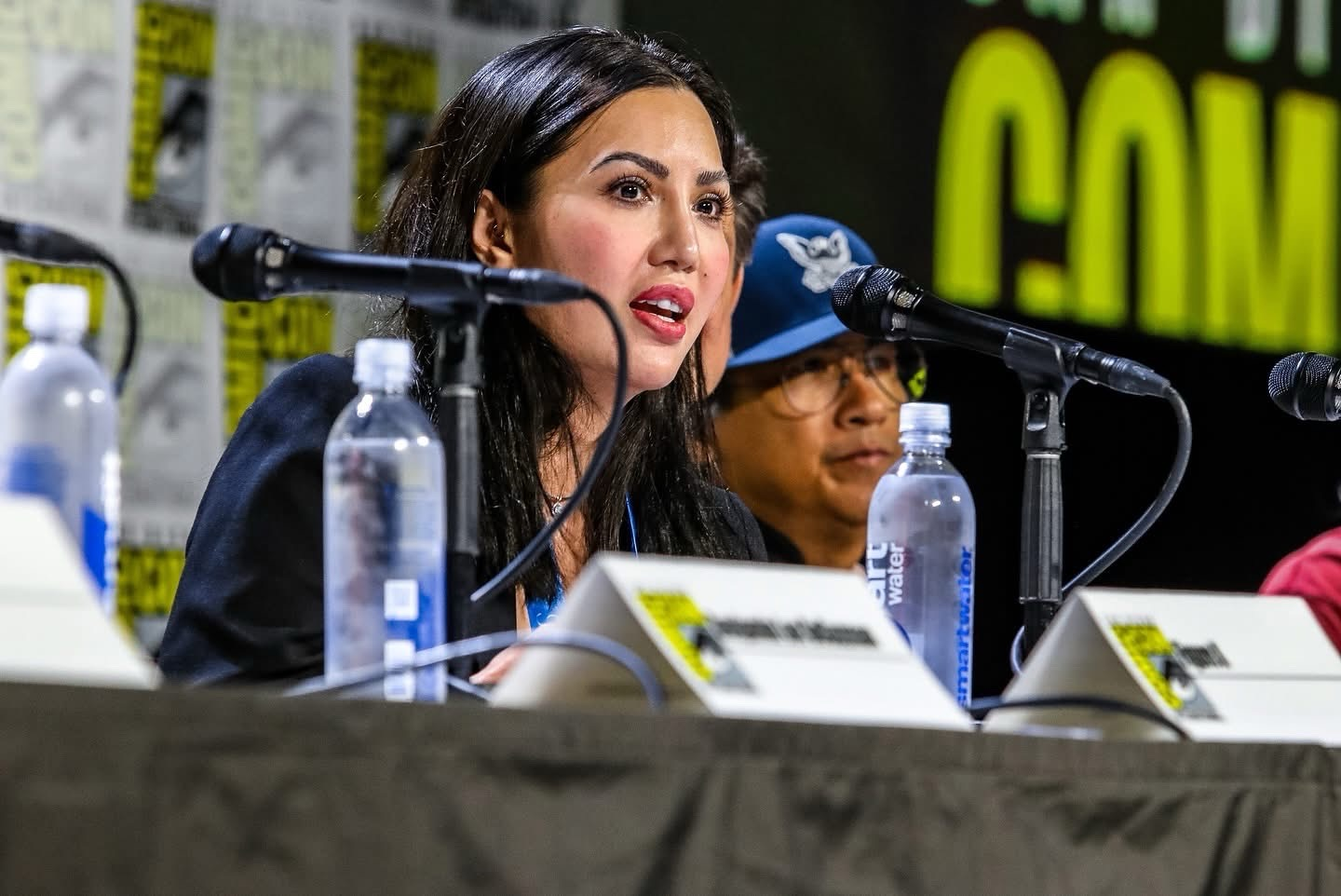
- Ventura at San Diego Comic-Con in 2025
- Born: Manila, Philippines
- Citizenship: Philippines; United States
- Occupations: Director; writer; producer
- Years active: 2011–present
- Spouse: Ely Buendia (formerly)

Maria Diane Ventura is a Filipino-American filmmaker. She is known for her documentary film Eraserheads: Combo on the Run (2026) and feature Your Color (Deine Farbe) (2021).

== Life and career ==
Ventura was born in Manila, Philippines. She pursued filmmaking, attending film classes at NYU Tisch School of the Arts and studying at the London Film Academy. She founded DVent Productions, a New York-based multimedia company focused on films and live concert production.

In the mid-2000s, Ventura managed the Filipino alternative rock band Pupil and served as producer of their debut album Beautiful Machines (2005). She wrote the lead single "Nasaan Ka?", provided vocals on the title track, and contributed backing vocals and piano on other tracks. She also co-wrote the songs "Beautiful Machines" and "Kalawakan".

Ventura began her filmmaking career with the 2011 short film TheRapist, starring Cherie Gil and Marco Morales, which premiered at the Cinemanila International Film Festival and depicts a psychologist assessing an accused rapist. Her feature film debut, Awaken (Mulat) (2014), an exploration of dream states and altered consciousness is a psychological drama starring Jake Cuenca and Loren Burgos, released on platforms like iflix and Amazon Prime. Her first international film, Your Color (Deine Farbe) (2021), is a socio-political drama and coming-of-age story starring Jannik Schümann and Nyamandi Adrian, the film follows two childhood friends from a small German town who move to Barcelona, where fate and their choices test their bond. Filmed in Germany and Spain, it premiered at the Hof International Film Festival.

Ventura produced the Eraserheads' Huling El Bimbo reunion concert in 2022, which drew over 75,000 attendees, co-produced the Eraserheads world tour in 2023–2024, and released Eraserheads: Combo on the Run, a documentary about the band's journey to that concert, which had its U.S. premiere at San Diego Comic-Con in 2025 and screened at the Hawaiʻi International Film Festival before its theatrical release through Warner Bros. Abramorama later acquired the North American distribution rights, and the film received the widest theatrical release of any Philippine documentary in North America when it opened in Canada and the United States on April 24, 2026, before becoming available on Netflix worldwide in May 2026.

== Personal life ==
Ventura was married to Filipino rock musician Ely Buendia, the lead vocalist of the Eraserheads.

== Filmography ==
Year	Film				
Year	Film	Director	Writer	Producer	Notes
2011	TheRapist	Yes	Yes	Yes	Short film
2015	Awaken (Mulat)	Yes	Yes	Yes	
2021	Your Color (Deine Farbe)	Yes	Yes	Yes	
2026	Eraserheads: Combo on the Run	Yes	Yes	Yes	Documentary

== Awards and nominations ==
Year	Result	Award	Category	Work	Ref.
2026	Won	The Long Island Music and Entertainment Hall of Fame	Best International Director	Eraserheads: Combo on the Run	
2026	Nominated	PMPC Star Awards for Movies	Documentary Movie of the Year	Eraserheads: Combo on the Run	
2026	Nominated	The EDDYS	Best Director	Eraserheads: Combo on the Run	
2026	Nominated	The EDDYS	Best Picture	Eraserheads: Combo on the Run	
