= Wild Life (Pupil album) =

2007 studio album by Pupil

Wildlife

Studio album by Pupil
- Released: November 9, 2007
- Recorded: 2007
- Studios: Soundsrite Studio (Makati City); Jack's Tone (Quezon City); Wombworks Studios
- Genres: Alternative rock; post-punk revival
- Length: 41:53
- Label: Sony BMG Music Entertainment (Philippines), Inc.
- Producers: Pupil; Jerome Velasco

Pupil chronology
Beautiful Machines (2005)	Wildlife (2007)	Limiters of the Infinity Pool (2011)

Singles from Wildlife
- 1. "Set Me Apart" Released: May 2007; 2. "Sala" Released: November 2007; 3. "Monobloc" Released: 2008; 4. "Teacher's Pet" Released: 2009; 5. "Disconnection Notice" Released: 2009

Wildlife is the second studio album by the Filipino alternative rock band Pupil, released on November 9, 2007 through Sony BMG Music Entertainment.

The album featured the single “Set Me Apart”, used as the theme song for Animax. It is also drummer Bogs Jugo’s last contribution to the band, as he was later replaced by Wendell Garcia of Barbie's Cradle.

== Recording ==
In 2007, the band were commissioned to write a new theme song for Animax. They recorded two songs, “Matador” and “Set Me Apart”, composed by their manager and Buendia's then-partner Diane Ventura (who later wrote the lead single "Sala" and album tracks "Fin" and "Bato"). "They just gave me the theme or the idea of what they wanted us to make for the target market of Animax," she said.

Animax chose "Set Me Apart", which was released in May 2007 with an animated music video premiering the following month. The video later won Best Music Video at the PromaxBDA Awards the following year. "Set Me Apart" also became drummer Bogs Jugo’s last song with the band, as he left soon after.

The band recruited Wendell Garcia of Barbie's Cradle as their new drummer. He said of his working relationship with the members: "Masaya. Malaking challenge sa repertoire ang ganitong music, first time ako tumugtog ng ganitong music (Fun. It's a big challenge to play this kind of music)."

Guitarist Yanni Yuzon stated that the album took three and a half weeks to record. "We intended to complete this in a month but we finished half a week ahead of our schedule," he said. Buendia continued: “Making the album was a breeze. We found it easy to talk to each other about it.” Yuzon also explained the reasoning for the title: “Chaos can be good or bad. We’d like to think we’re in control. But life is a series of unforeseen circumstances. We are the voice of the minority, the disenfranchised.”

== Release ==
The album was launched at a mall show at Eastwood City in Quezon City, where the band introduced Garcia and performed songs from the record.

The music video for "Disconnection Notice" was directed by Quark Henares and features Glaiza de Castro described as manic-dancing like Ian Curtis.

Wild Life was digitally remastered and rereleased as a special edition on July 10, 2009 to commemorate the band's fourth anniversary. Its bonus content included live performances, music videos, demos, and wallpapers of the band. It was later released to streaming services in February 2020 by Sony Music Philippines.

== Track listing ==
=== Original release ===
No.	Title	Writer(s)	Length
1.	"Fin"	Diane Ventura	1:13
2.	"Matador"	Ely Buendia; Ventura	3:19
3.	"Monobloc"	Buendia	3:36
4.	"Here I Go Again"	Buendia	3:56
5.	"Talon"	Yanni Yuzon	3:38
6.	"Sumasabay"	Dok Sergio; Day Cabuhat	4:10
7.	"Animal Lover"	Buendia	3:10
8.	"Teacher's Pet"	Buendia	3:17
9.	"Sala"	Ventura	3:46
10.	"Disconnection Notice"	Buendia	4:05
11.	"Bato"	Ventura	4:07
12.	"Set Me Apart"	Buendia	3:24
Total length:			41:53

=== 2009 Special Edition bonus tracks ===
No.	Title	Writer(s)	Length
1.	"Different Worlds (Live)"	Buendia	4:53
2.	"Sala (Live)"	Ventura	5:53
3.	"Here I Go Again (Live)"	Buendia	3:31
4.	"Monobloc (Live)"	Buendia	5:10
5.	"Teacher's Pet (Live)"	Buendia	4:23
6.	"Disconnection Notice (Live)"	Buendia	5:44
7.	"Teacher's Pet (Demo)"	Buendia	3:17
8.	"Sumasabay (Demo)"	Sergio; Cabuhat	5:48
9.	"Matador (Demo)"	Buendia; Ventura	4:15
Total length:			44:54

=== 2009 Special Edition music videos ===
No.	Title	Length
1.	"Sala"	3:45
2.	"Monobloc"	3:42
3.	"Disconnection Notice"	4:03
4.	"Teacher's Pet"	3:25

== Personnel ==
=== Pupil ===
- Ely Buendia - vocals, guitar
- Yanni Yuzon - guitar, vocals
- Dok Sergio - bass, vocals
- Wendell Garcia - drums

=== Production ===
- Pupil - producer
- Jerome Velasco - producer, guitars
- Jack Rufo - mixing
- Patrick Tirano - mastering

=== Design ===
- Mia Singson - sleeve design
- Dok Sergio - sleeve design
- Francis Magalona - photography
