= Infinity Pool =

Infinity Pool may refer to:

- infinity pool, a reflecting pool or swimming pool without visible boundaries
- Infinity Pool, a 2013 album by the Danish band When Saints Go Machine
- "Infinity Pool", a song on the 2021 album Ghost of Your Guitar Solo by MJ Lenderman
- Infinity Pool (film), a 2023 sci-fi horror film by Brandon Cronenberg

== See also ==
- Limiters of the Infinity Pool, a 2011 album by the Filipino alternative rock band Pupil
