= Zilch (album) =

2015 studio album by Pupil

Studio album by Pupil
- Released: March 6, 2015
- Genre: Rock; alternative rock
- Length: 42:30
- Label: MCA Music
- Producer: Pupil

Pupil chronology
| Limiters of the Infinity Pool (2011) | Zilch (2015) |

Singles from Zilch
- 1. "Out of Control" Released: July 21, 2014; 2. "Why" Released: January 26, 2015; 3. "Cheap Thrill" Released: March 11, 2016

Zilch is the fourth studio album by the Filipino alternative rock band Pupil, released on March 6, 2015 through MCA Music. It is the first album to feature Jerome Velasco as lead guitarist. Zilch features the singles "Out of Control", "Why", and "Cheap Thrill".

== Recording ==
The album features Velasco as lead guitarist after Yanni Yuzon left the band in 2013. “Parang back to zero kami—clean slate, kasi bago na yung gitarista namin (It's like we're back to zero...because we have a new guitarist). That changes the whole game,” vocalist Ely Buendia said. The album title refers to the band's "back to basics" approach to recording it.

Drummer Wendell Garcia recorded his parts on a marathon 15-hour session in a photo studio, surrounded by foam and mattresses. "'Pag narinig niyo yung album, please notice the drums. Pinaghirapan namin talaga (If you hear the album, please notice the drums. We really worked hard)," said Buendia. The band cited Led Zeppelin drummer John Bonham as an inspiration for the album's drum sound.

The vocalist also called bassist Dok Sergio a "geek and catalyst" for the band's experimentation while making the album. “Songwriting is still the key to good music,” Sergio added, recounting how he would often ask Buendia to critique his compositions.

== Release ==
The band released the album's first single "Out of Control" in July 2014. Its music video was directed by Erin Pascual and features model Ornusa Cadness in a dystopian Manila. The video was said to be inspired by Neill Blomkamp, Ridley Scott, and Steven Spielberg's Minority Report.

Originally slated for release in January 2015, the album was released on March with a launch party.

The music video for "Cheap Thrill" was launched at Saguijo Bar in Makati in April 2016. Also directed by Pascual, it features the band performing on an island.

== Track listing ==
| No. | Title | Writer(s) | Length |
|---|---|---|---|
| 1. | "Firewall" | Ely Buendia | 4:34 |
| 2. | "Why" | Buendia | 5:16 |
| 3. | "Out of Control" | Buendia | 4:58 |
| 4. | "Stem" | Buendia | 3:31 |
| 5. | "Resonate" | Buendia; Erwin Romulo | 4:23 |
| 6. | "Rain" | Buendia | 3:55 |
| 7. | "Cheap Thrill" | Buendia; Wendell Garcia | 4:28 |
| 8. | "Volatile" | Buendia | 3:22 |
| 9. | "Tachyon" | Dok Sergio | 3:29 |
| 10. | "MNL" | Buendia | 4:40 |
| Total length: | | | 42:30 |

== Personnel ==
=== Pupil ===
- Ely Buendia - vocals, guitar
- Jerome Velasco - lead guitar
- Dok Sergio - bass, vocals (track 9)
- Wendell Garcia - drums
