= In Love and War (Francis Magalona and Ely Buendia album) =

Studio album by Francis Magalona and Ely Buendia
- Released: May 25, 2010
- Recorded: 2008–2009
- Genre: Alternative rock; Rap
- Length: 36:50
- Label: Musiko Records & Sony Music Philippines

Francis Magalona chronology
Best of Francis M (2002)	In Love and War (2010)

Ely Buendia chronology
Wanted Bedspacer (2000)	In Love and War (2010)	Method Adaptor (2024)

Singles from In Love and War
- 1. "Higante" Released: November 2009; 2. "Bus Stop" Released: April 2010; 3. "Wasak Waltz" Released: September 2010

In Love and War is a collaborative studio album by Francis Magalona and Ely Buendia, posthumously released in May 25, 2010 after Magalona’s death. It also features contributions from Pupil, Gloc-9, Turbo Goth, Hilera, and Radha.

== Recording ==
Initially titled The Sickos Project, Magalona recorded the album with Buendia as he was undergoing chemotherapy for leukemia. They recorded "Higante" in late 2008.

== Release ==
In Love and War received nominations at the 2010 NU Rock Awards, including Album of the Year, Song of the Year for "Higante", and Artist of the Year for Magalona and Buendia. They eventually won Producer of the Year. "Higante" also won Favorite Collaboration at the 2010 MYX Music Awards.

== Track listing ==
No.	Title	Writer(s)	Featured Artist(s)	Length
1.	"Higante"	Francis Magalona	Hardware Syndrome	03:51
2.	"Bleeder"	Ely Buendia	Pupil	02:30
3.	"Bus Stop" (The Hollies cover)	Graham Gouldman		05:08
4.	"Buzzkill"	Buendia; Aristotle Pollisco	Gloc-9; Turbo Goth	03:33
5.	"Dreamdate"	Diane Ventura		02:59
6.	"Hands On"	Buendia	Hilera	03:13
7.	"Bum Ticker"	Ely Buendia	Hilera; Brigada	03:12
8.	"Wasak Waltz"	Buendia; Magalona		03:35
9.	"It's Alright, Ma (I'm Only Bleeding)" (Bob Dylan cover)	Bob Dylan	The Purplechickens; Radha	04:33
10.	"Unstrung Heroes" (DJ Kimosave Remix)	Buendia		04:16
Total length:				36:50
