= Beautiful Machines =

2005 studio album by Pupil

Studio album by Pupil
- Released: November 11, 2005
- Studio: Wombworks Studios
- Genres: Alternative rock; post-punk revival
- Length: 53:27
- Labels: Musiko Records; Sony BMG Music Entertainment
- Producers: Pupil; Patrick Tirano

Pupil chronology
Beautiful Machines (2005)	Wild Life (2007)

Singles from Beautiful Machines
- 1. "Nasaan Ka?" Released: November 6, 2005; 2. "Dianetic" Released: 2006; 3. "Dulo Ng Dila" Released: 2006; 4. "Gamu-Gamo" Released: 2006

Beautiful Machines is the debut studio album by the Filipino alternative rock band Pupil, released on November 11, 2005 through Sony BMG Music Entertainment. The album featured the singles “Nasaan Ka?”, "Dianetic", "Dulo Ng Dila", and "Gamu-Gamo".

== Background ==
Pupil was formed in 2005 as a spin-off of The Mongols, an underground band featuring Eraserheads vocalist Ely Buendia (vocals), Teeth guitarist Jerome Velasco (guitars), Yanni Yuzon (bass), and Bogs Jugo (drums). When Velasco left the band to study in the United States, the band members recruited Dok Sergio (who also played guitar for Teeth), who swapped duties with Yuzon and played bass. The band's manager and Buendia's then-partner Diane Ventura described Pupil's sound as "more pop" while The Mongols were "guitar-driven". The band signed with Sony BMG on September.

== Music and lyrics ==
All members contributed songs to the album. “It’s less indulgent. It’s more focused,” said Buendia. “This is uncompromised. We are now talking directly to the audience,” said Sergio. Jugo added: “We did as we please. We don’t care about making hits.” The band recorded at Wombwork Studios in Marikina.

The album featured the lead single “Nasaan Ka?”, which was written by Ventura (who also sings in the title track). A music video was directed by Quark Henares. “Nasaan Ka?” later won Best Performance by a New Group at the 19th Awit Awards.

One of the album tracks, "Blow Your House Down", appeared in the animated film Hoodwinked! The film, which was the first independently produced 3D animated feature to be produced in the Philippines, later premiered in December.

== Release ==
The band sold the first hundred copies of the album at a bar in Makati two days before it was released in stores.

== Track listing ==
No.	Title	Writer(s)	Length
1.	"Different Worlds"	Ely Buendia	4:00
2.	"Blow Your House Down"	Buendia	3:15
3.	"Nasaan Ka?"	Diane Ventura	3:05
4.	"She Talks to Trees"	Buendia	3:34
5.	"False Alarm"	Bogs Jugo	3:29
6.	"Gamu-Gamo"	Buendia	4:04
7.	"Mary"	Yanni Yuzon; Jojo Del Rosario	4:19
8.	"Hypersober"	Jugo	2:39
9.	"Dulo Ng Dila"	Dok Sergio	3:56
10.	"Beautiful Machines"	Buendia; Ventura; Jerome Velasco	4:47
11.	"All This Time"	Buendia	3:39
12.	"Dianetic"	Buendia	4:17
13.	"Kalawakan"	Buendia; Ventura	4:07
14.	"Lost Guide"	Yuzon; Amanda Lapus	4:25
Total length:			53:27

== Personnel ==
Pupil

- Ely Buendia - vocals, guitars
- Yanni Yuzon - guitars, vocals (track 7, 14)
- Dok Sergio - bass, vocals (track 9)
- Bogs Jugo - drums, vocals (track 5)

Additional musicians

- Diane Ventura - vocals (track 10), backing vocals (track 1, 6), piano (track 3)
- Jerome Velasco - additional guitar and keyboards (track 10)

Production

- Pupil - producer
- Patrick Tirano - producer, mixing, engineering
- Zach Lucero - mastering
- Diane Ventura - executive producer
- Rudy Tee - executive producer
- Vic Valenciano - A&R

Design

- Gorio Vicuna - art direction, graphic design
- Ryan Agoncillo - photography
- Mark Anthony Taduran - collage design
- Isha Andaya - stylist
- Dok Sergio - Wombworks session photos
