= Limiters of the Infinity Pool =

2011 studio album by Pupil

Studio album by Pupil
- Released: January 19, 2011
- Studio: Wombworks Studios
- Genre: Rock; alternative rock
- Length: 45:52
- Label: Sony Music Philippines
- Producer: Pupil; Patrick Tirano

Pupil chronology
Wild Life (2007)	Limiters of the Infinity Pool (2011)	Zilch (2015)

Singles from Limiters of the Infinity Pool
- 1. "TNT" Released: April 4, 2011; 2. "20/20" Released: July 22, 2011

Limiters of the Infinity Pool is the third studio album by the Filipino alternative rock band Pupil, released on January 19, 2011 through Sony Music Philippines.

== Recording ==
The album features contributions from The Dawn guitarist Francis Reyes and Singaporean musician Amanda Ling. In an interview with Bianca Gonzalez, Buendia said that he wrote "20/20" about loss of innocence.

== Release ==
The music video for "20/20" was directed by Jason Tan and shot on the streets of EDSA during Holy Week.

== Track listing ==
No.	Title	Writer(s)	Length
1.	"Let Her Rip"	Ely Buendia	4:13
2.	"Distortion"	Buendia	3:40
3.	"TNT"	Buendia	4:34
4.	"20/20"	Buendia	5:19
5.	"Pikit Bukas"	Dok Sergio	4:07
6.	"Pusakal"	Buendia	3:34
7.	"Pampalakas"	Sergio	3:27
8.	"One, Two"	Sergio	2:09
9.	"Obese"	Buendia	3:35
10.	"Deft Mechanic"	Sergio	3:01
11.	"Morning Gift"	Wendell Garcia	3:32
12.	"The Low End"	Buendia	4:41
Total length:			45:52

== Personnel ==
=== Pupil ===
- Ely Buendia - vocals, guitar
- Yanni Yuzon - guitar
- Dok Sergio - bass, vocals (tracks 5, 7, 8, 10)
- Wendell Garcia - drums, vocals (track 11)

=== Additional musicians ===
- Amanda Ling - keyboards (tracks 4, 8)
- Francis Reyes - guitar (track 4)

=== Production ===
- Pupil - producer
- Pat Tirano - producer, recording, mixing, mastering
