= Eraserheads: Combo on the Run =

2025 documentary film

- Theatrical release poster
- Directed by: Maria Diane Ventura
- Written by: Maria Diane Ventura; Aldus Santos; Chuck Gutierrez
- Produced by: Francis Lumen; Maria Diane Ventura
- Starring: Ely Buendia; Raimund Marasigan; Marcus Adoro; Buddy Zabala
- Cinematography: Hilarion Banks
- Edited by: Chuck Gutierrez; Hilarion Banks; Adrian Arcega
- Music by: Earl Drilon; Atlas Glaas
- Production companies: DVent Pictures; Offshore Music; Voyage Studios; WEU Events Management Services
- Distributed by: Warner Bros. Pictures
- Release date: March 19, 2025
- Running time: 102 minutes
- Country: Philippines

Eraserheads: Combo on the Run is a 2025 documentary film about the rock band Eraserheads. It follows the band's story leading up to their reunion concert in 2022. The film is directed by Maria Diane Ventura. The title comes from the song "Combo on the Run" from the band's debut album Ultraelectromagneticpop! (1993). The film was theatrically released on March 19, 2025, and was released worldwide on the streaming platform Netflix on May 30, 2026.

== Background ==
Considered one of the most influential and successful bands in the Philippines, Eraserheads first broke up in 2002. They later reunited for a series of reunion concerts in 2008 and 2009 and have since made sporadic touring and promotional appearances in the country and overseas.

In December 2022, the band held their third reunion concert, titled "Huling El Bimbo" after the song of the same name, at the SMDC Festival Grounds in Parañaque with an estimated 75,000 people in attendance. The success of the concert led to a world tour for the next three years.

Vocalist Ely Buendia first teased the documentary in a 2023 interview. The band later premiered the trailer for the documentary, directed by Buendia's former partner Maria Diane Ventura and named after the song of the same name, at San Diego Comic-Con in California in July 2024; it was later released online.

Ventura described the documentary as "a comprehensive deconstruction of the band’s mythology, humanity, complex relationship and the lasting mark they left on Filipino culture — one that transcends generations and differences". It took three years to complete, she added: "Each interview revealed new layers and complexities, which found us constantly reframing to deepen the narrative." Post-production for the film was done in Germany and the United States. It is also the first Philippine documentary to be mixed in Dolby Atmos.

== Release ==
A work-in-progress version of the documentary was screened at the Manila International Film Festival on March 4, 2025, with Ventura in attendance. It was then released in Philippine cinemas in March 2025. Initially planned for a limited release from March 21 to 23, its theatrical run was extended to the following weeks due to popular demand. The band held a surprise performance at a sold-out screening in Quezon City.

At the end of the documentary, the band announced an upcoming concert called Electric Fun Music Festival, to be held at SMDC Festival Grounds at a later date. They also teased new music, later announced as "Get This Love Thing Down", an unreleased song from recording sessions for their final studio album Carbon Stereoxide (2001). Commenting on the announcements in a press conference, Buendia declared that the band is "here to stay".

Combo on the Run was also screened at San Diego Comic-Con in July 2025, alongside the release of a comic book of the same name.

Abramorama acquired distribution rights for the film, which was theatrically released in North America on April 24, 2026. The film was released worldwide on the streaming platform Netflix on May 30, 2026.

== Reception ==
Billboard Philippines regarded the documentary as "a moving documentary for the younglings discovering their music and longtime fans reconnecting with the songs that defined their generation". Rappler pointed out the documentary's setup of the band members's individual interviews, adding: "The members largely didn’t know what each one was saying, and in the final product, that wonderfully leads to 'a-ha' moments for the viewer."

=== Accolades ===
Year	Award	Category	Recipient(s)	Result	Ref.
2026	The Long Island Music and Entertainment Hall of Fame	Best International Director	Maria Diane Ventura	Won	
2026	PMPC Star Awards for Movies	Documentary Movie of the Year	Maria Diane Ventura	Nominated	
2026	The EDDYS	Best Director	Maria Diane Ventura	Nominated	
2026	The EDDYS	Best Picture	Maria Diane Ventura	Nominated	
2026	The EDDYS	Best Cinematography	Hilarion Banks and Dom Dycaico	Nominated	
2026	The EDDYS	Best Editing	Hilarion Banks and Chuck Gutierrez	Nominated	
2026	The EDDYS	Best Visual Effects	Jaye Jacinto and Sonny Burgos	Nominated	
2026	The EDDYS	Best Sound	Jason Abell and Earl Drilon	Nominated	
