= Cheats (band) =

Filipino indie rock band

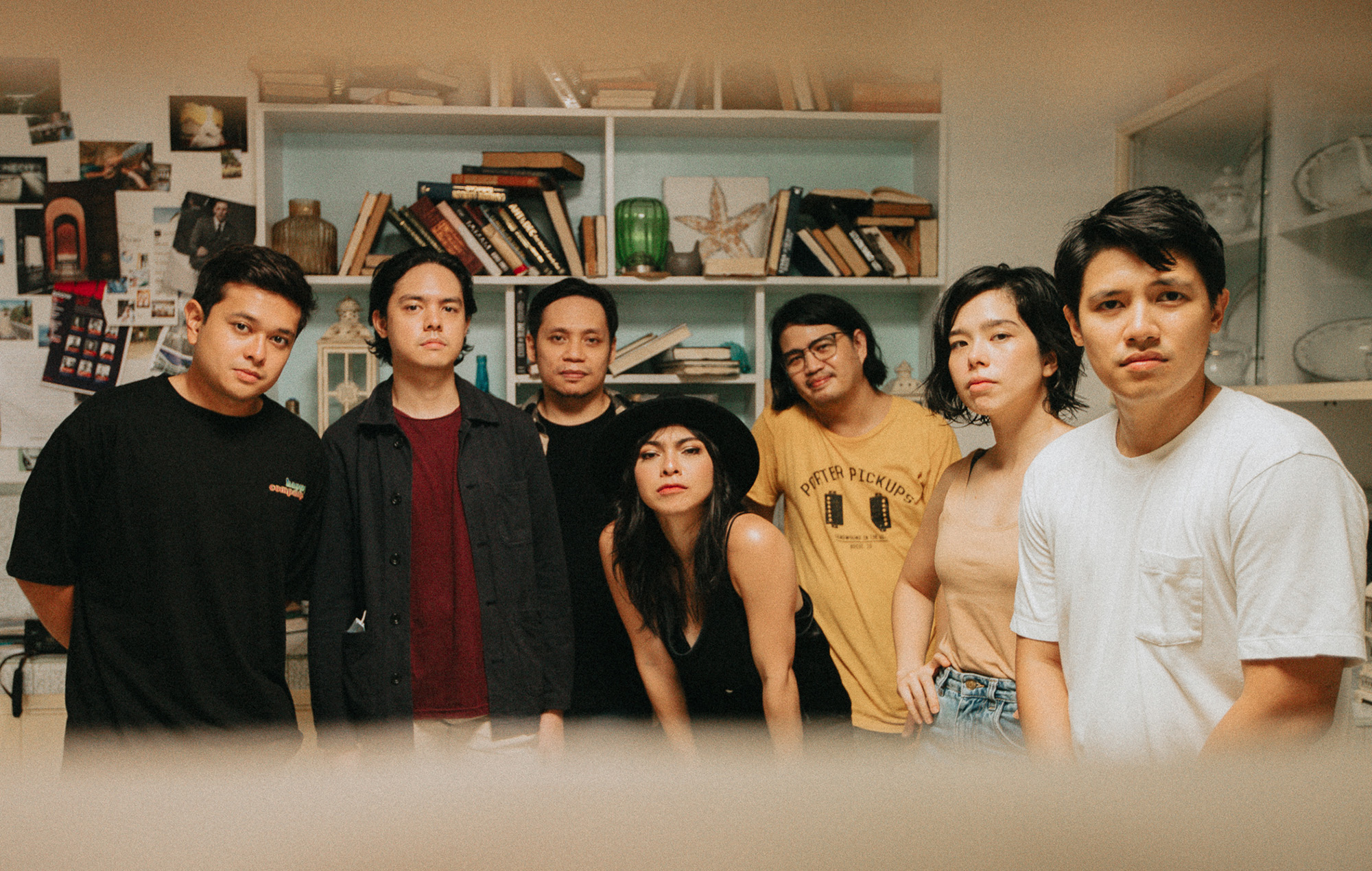
- Cheats in 2021

Background information
- Genres: Indie; Pop rock; Alternative rock
- Years active: 2013–present
- Labels: Offshore Music Philippines; Island Philippines; MCA Music
- Members: Jim Bacarro; Saab Magalona; Candy Gamos; Manny Tanglao; Kyle Quismundo; Enzo Hermosa; Jason Caballa
- Past members: Ernest Aguila; Mau Torralba; Cholo Hermosa

Cheats is a 7-piece Filipino indie rock band. The band was first formed by Jim Bacarro in 2013, and features Bacarro on vocals, keys, and guitar, Saab Magalona-Bacarro and Candy Gamos on vocals, Manny Tanglao on bass, Jason Caballa and Kyle Quismundo on guitars, and Enzo Hermosa on drums. Cheats' eponymous debut album was released in July 2015.

Originally signed under independent label LockedDown Entertainment and later under Ely Buendia's Offshore Music, the band has been signed under MCA Music thru sublabel Island Records Philippines since 2021.

Cheats celebrated their 10-year anniversary in a concert in Makati.

== History ==
=== Formation and early years ===
Cheats was first formed by Jim Bacarro in 2013. Jim, Manny Tanglao, and Ernest Aguila were originally part of a band called Ernville that broke up. Jim and Manny were originally just planning to be a duo, similar to LCD Soundsystem. Ernest then joined the group. They then invited their friends Saab Magalona and Candy Gamos, who were running a gig production group called Girlscout at the time, and had been booking Ernville before. The band name came from bonding over playing video games.

One of their biggest gigs during this time was the 7107 Music Festival Local Stage in Subic. It was their that audience took note of their chemistry, especially between Jim and Saab. Later on, Jason Caballa, the guitarist from the band Pedicab joined the group to step in for Ernest, who was preparing for bar exams. Kyle Quismundo and Enzo Hermosa were also added to the group on guitar and drums respectively. Jim and Saab would later marry on January 24, 2015.

=== Debut album ===
In July 2015, Cheats released their self-titled debut album, Cheats. It was produced by Ely Buendia, a friend of Saab's father. It also included the song "Newspaper Girl". Later that year, they had a gig at Saguijo, a well-known bar. They sold out the venue, and broke the record for most liquor sold during a gig. In 2016, they made their first appearance at the Laneway Festival in Singapore, opening for international acts Beach House, CHVRCHES, The 1975, and others. It was their first international festival and they became the first Filipino act to play for the festival.

=== Before the Babies ===
In 2017, Cheats went on a tour of the US with the band Sandwich and also performed at the Clockenflap Festival in Hong Kong. On December 8, 2017, they released their second album Before the Babies, which had been delayed twice. The title of the album came from the announcement that Jim and Saab were expecting twins.

In 2019, Cheats released an unofficial EP, Ultramilk. A third album was set for release in March 2020, but due to the COVID-19 pandemic, the album was scrapped. Still, they were able to release new music, as they collaborated with Buendia once again on the single "Plunder My Heart". They also performed at the digital ASEAN Music Showcase Festival.

=== Island Records and Houseplants ===
In 2021, Cheats released their first Tagalog single, "Tawid", with a music video shot during the pandemic. Later that year, they signed with under MCA Music thru sublabel Island Records Philippines. On October 27, 2021, they released their first single for their third album "Hakbang". Originally written in English during the pandemic, it was later translated to Tagalog. The single also came with a black and white music video that starred Piolo Pascual. Another single was released before the album, "Kapit", which was a homage to the Manila Sound movement of the 1970s. On November 11, 2022, they released their third album (and first under Island Records) Houseplants. This album focused on the feelings of security and anxiety and also included the songs "Milk" and "Machine Jr." from the Ultramilk EP.

Cheats celebrated their 10-year anniversary in a concert in Makati in 2024. They also performed at the Linya-Linya Land festival that year.

== Artistry ==
=== Influences ===
Cheats has cited a range of influences including LCD Soundsystem, Radiohead, and the Spice Girls. Arcade Fire was also one of their original influences, but decided to go in the direction of sounding "poppier" with the additions of the girls. Magalona-Bacarro, who is the daughter of famed rapper Francis Magalona, takes her rock and hip-hop influences from him, which include Nirvana, Beastie Boys, Rage against the Machine, and the Filipino band Sandwich. The band has also paid homage to the band New Order through their song "Cake", and Smashing Pumpkins through their song "Printers". Feist and Massive Attack, who they got to share the stage with in various festivals, are also seen as their "music heroes".

=== Musical style ===
Cheats has been described as alternative indie rock. The band has described their sound as "creating sweet melodies with a bitter aftertaste". They want listeners to "dance all night long and before crying on the ride home". In their second album Before the Babies, they experimented with more styles including funk and indie pop for a mellower sound. The band are also known for their live performances, with their "charismatic stage presence" and "fun sound" making them a hit at music festivals.

== Accolades ==
Award	Year	Nominees	Category	Result	Ref.
Awit Awards	2021	Cheats	Peoples' Voice Favorite Group Artist	Nominated	
Yahoo Celebrity Awards	2014	Cheats	Emerging Band of the Year	Nominated	

== Discography ==
=== Studio albums ===
- Cheats (2015)
- Before the Babies (2017)
- Houseplants (2022)

=== Singles ===
- Newspaper Girl
- Accidents
- Drunk
- Ringer
- Crumble
- Talk
- Milk
- Machine Jr.
- Hakbang
- Plunder My Heart (with Ely Buendia)
- Tawid
- Kapit
