= The Mongols (band) =

Filipino rock band

- Origin: Metro Manila, Philippines
- Genres: Rock; grunge
- Years active: 2003–2005
- Labels: Viva; Criminal
- Spinoffs: Pupil
- Spinoff of: Eraserheads; Teeth; Daydream Cycle
- Past members: Ely Buendia; Jerome Velasco; Yanni Yuzon; Bogs Jugo

The Mongols were a Filipino underground supergroup comprising Eraserheads vocalist Ely Buendia, Teeth guitarist Jerome Velasco, bassist Yanni Yuzon, and drummer Bogs Jugo.

Formed after Buendia left Eraserheads in 2002, The Mongols released an album, Buddha's Pest, in 2003. Velasco left the band soon after to study in the United States, and the rest of the band recruited Teeth guitarist Dok Sergio and renamed the band Pupil.

== History ==
=== 2002–2003: Formation ===
Buendia had left Eraserheads in March 2002. He later organized live shows with his friends, playing covers of his previous band, Teeth, and The Velvet Underground. Meanwhile, Teeth had gone on hiatus in 2003 after their vocalist Glenn Jacinto migrated to the United States. Velasco later met Buendia and got together for informal jam sessions.

Buendia came up with the name of the band after visiting the American Museum of Natural History in New York City with his partner Diane Ventura (who later managed the band), where they saw an exhibit featuring Mongolian llamas.

The band first performed in Davao in January 2003. They self-produced an EP, A Fraction of a Second, which they sold at their live shows.

=== 2003: Buddha's Pest ===
In November 2003, the band released an album, Buddha's Pest, through Viva Records. It included the lead single "Bulakbol".

=== 2005: Pupil ===
In 2005, Velasco left the Mongols to study in the United States. The band recruited Teeth guitarist Dok Sergio and renamed the band Pupil.

== Influences ==
The band's influences include the Velvet Underground, My Bloody Valentine, Sonic Youth, and The Jesus and Mary Chain.

== Members ==
- Ely Buendia – vocals, guitars
- Jerome Velasco – lead guitars
- Yanni Yuzon – bass
- Bogs Jugo – drums

== Discography ==
=== Studio albums ===
| Title | Album details |
|---|---|
| Buddha's Pest | Released: November 2003; Label: Viva; Format: CD |

=== EPs ===
- A Fraction of a Second (Redrum, 2003)

=== Music videos ===
| Year | Title | Director |
|---|---|---|
| 2004 | "Bakit Nga Ba?" | Francis Magalona |
| 2004 | "Keeper" | Kurt Kataract, Diane Ventura and Manie Magbanua Jr. |
| 2005 | "Heroine" | |
