= Wanted Bedspacer =

Wanted: Bedspacer

Studio album by Ely Buendia
- Released: December 21, 2000
- Studio: Suite 16 Studios (Buendia's home studio), Quezon City
- Genre: Electronica; lo-fi
- Length: 38:10
- Label: Musiko Records & BMG Records (Pilipinas) Inc.
- Producer: Ely Buendia; Sancho Sanchez

Ely Buendia chronology
Wanted: Bedspacer (2000)	In Love & War (2010)

Singles from Wanted: Bedspacer
- 1. "Wanted: Bedspacer" Released: November 2000; 2. "Santo" Released: November 2000

Wanted: Bedspacer is the debut solo album by Filipino musician Ely Buendia, released on December 21, 2000 by BMG Records (Pilipinas) Inc.

== Recording ==
Buendia started working on material for Wanted: Bedspacer in September 1999, initially writing them for Rico J. Puno. He recorded demos with a Roland VS-1680 multitrack recorder at his home studio in Quezon City (credited as Suite 16 Studios in the album liner notes). Buendia co-produced the album with his friend and housemate Romel “Sancho” Sanchez.

The album’s electronica sound expands on Eraserheads’s previous album Natin99 (1999), with tracks such as “Kakaiba” and “Hotchik” using synthesizers and drum machine beats with fuzz guitars. Buendia stated that he wanted a “dreamy” sound for the album, listening to electronic acts such as Cassius and Massive Attack during production. He wrote the track "Acid Tongue" about his father.

BMG reissued Wanted: Bedspacer in 2009.

In a 2024 interview with Daily Tribune promoting his second solo album Method Adaptor, Buendia said that he did not consider Wanted: Bedspacer to be an official release since "parang laro-laro lang ‘yun, nag-experiment lang ako sa kuwarto ko (because I was just playing around then, I just experimented a bit in the my room) and I decided to release it," he continued. He added in an interview with Rappler: “I didn’t really think about marketing it; it wasn’t promoted, and I didn’t want to.”

== Reception ==
Professional ratings
Review scores
Source	Rating
Allmusic	2/5 stars

Mon Castro of Manila Standard describes Wanted: Bedspacer as a wonderful experimental album. Poch Concepcion of Philippine Daily Inquirer noted that the album tries to sound different from Eraserheads which may elicit negative reactions among the band's fans. The album's experiments on electronica and studio effects were not warmly met by its audience.

== Track listing ==
All tracks are written by Ely Buendia.

No.	Title	Length
1.	"Wanted: Bedspacer"	6:15
2.	"Monday Mundane"	2:49
3.	"Kakaiba"	3:05
4.	"Santo"	3:46
5.	"Over 18"	3:45
6.	"Tapos Na"	3:13
7.	"Acid Tongue"	3:13
8.	"Oras"	3:33
9.	"Shallow Breathing"	4:20
10.	"Hotchik"	4:07
Total length:		38:10

- The cassette release of the album features a hidden track titled "In the Midnight".

== Personnel ==
- Ely Buendia - vocals, guitar, bass, synths, drum machine
- Romel "Sancho" Sanchez - guitar, bass
- Dex Aguila - drums
