= Hungry Young Poets =

Filipino band

Hungry Young Poets (a.k.a. HYP) was a band founded in the Philippines in 1996. They were originally formed as a duo by Barbie Almalbis (guitarist, vocalist, and songwriter) and Ricci Gurango (bassist). After releasing their first and only self-titled album, Franklin Benitez (drummer) officially completed the lineup as a trio.

In 1998, Gurango left the band to lead the cover band Little Green Men, before forming Mojofly. With Gurango's assertion of rights to the band's name, Almalbis and Benitez would later rename the group to Barbie's Cradle.

Barbie's Cradle later became a popular band, with Barbie Almalbis as lead vocalist, guitarist and songwriter, and Franklin Benitez as drummer. Rommel dela Cruz then joined the group as bassist, and by 1999, drummer Wendell Garcia joined replacing Benitez.

In 2005, the group disbanded and Almalbis went on to pursue a solo career, while Rommel dela Cruz soon became the bassist of Freestyle (the original bassist migrated to Australia).

== Discography ==
- 1998 - Barbie's Cradle
- 2000 - Music from the Buffet Table
- 2003 - Playing in the Fields

== Awards ==
- 2001 Katha Awards
  - Best Electronica Composition, "Up and at 'Em" (Power Puff Girls CD)
  - Best Folk Song, "Dear Paul"
  - Best Folk Vocal Performance, "Dear Paul" (single) by Barbie Almalbis
- 2001 NU107 Rock Awards
  - Best Music Video, "Money For Food" (video) by Monty Parungao
- 2000 Katha Awards
  - Best Alternative Song, "Goodnyt" (single)
  - Best Album Packaging, Barbie's Cradle (self-titled) by Barbie Almalbis/Yvette Co
- PARI 13th Awit Awards 2000
  - Best Album Packaging, Barbie's Cradle (self-titled)
- 1999 New Artist Awards Festival, 99.5RT
  - Best New Pop-Alternative Artist, Barbie's Cradle
- 1998 RX 93.1 OPM Yearend awards: Band of the Year
  - Best New Pop-Alternative Artist, Hungry Young Poets
- 1998 RX 93.1 OPM Yearend awards:
  - Top 7 OPM Request, Firewoman (2nd Place)
