= Pupil (band) =

Filipino rock band

- Origin: Metro Manila, Philippines
- Genres: Alternative rock; pop rock; Pinoy rock; post-punk revival
- Years active: 2005–2019; 2024–present
- Labels: Sony BMG; MCA Music
- Spinoff of: The Mongols; Eraserheads; Teeth; Barbie's Cradle; Daydream Cycle
- Members: Ely Buendia; Dok Sergio; Wendell Garcia; Jerome Velasco
- Past members: Yanni Yuzon; Bogs Jugo

Pupil are a Filipino alternative rock band. They currently consist of vocalist Ely Buendia, lead guitarist Jerome Velasco, bassist Dok Sergio, and drummer Wendell Garcia.

Formed as a spin-off of the Mongols, Pupil released their debut album Beautiful Machines in 2005. Jugo left soon after and was replaced by Garcia. The band released their second album Wild Life in 2007. Their third studio album, Limiters of the Infinity Pool, was released in 2011, after which Yuzon left the band in 2013. Velasco joined the band in 2014 after having produced Wild Life. They released their fourth studio album Zilch in 2015.

== History ==
=== 2005–2006: Formation, Beautiful Machines ===
Pupil was formed in 2005 as a spin-off of the Mongols, an underground band featuring Eraserheads vocalist Buendia, Teeth guitarist Velasco, Yuzon (bass), and Jugo (drums). When Velasco left the band to study in the United States, the band members recruited Sergio (who also played guitar for Teeth), who swapped duties with Yuzon and played bass.

Buendia got the name for Pupil after reading a medical book. Other names that were considered were Narcom, Tyrel Corp, Traitors, and The Gets. The band's manager and Buendia's then-partner Diane Ventura described Pupil's sound as "more pop" while the Mongols were "guitar-driven".

The band signed with Sony BMG on September and released their debut album Beautiful Machines in November. It featured the lead single “Nasaan Ka?”, which was written by Ventura (who also sings in the title track). A music video was directed by Quark Henares. “Nasaan Ka?” later won Best Performance by a New Group at the 19th Awit Awards.

The band contributed a song to the animated film Hoodwinked! called “Blow Your House Down”. The film, which was the first independently produced 3D animated feature to be produced in the Philippines, later premiered in December.

In 2006, the band collaborated with Barbie Almalbis on the Rockoustic Mania promotional campaign for Juicy Fruit. They released a promotional CD with two songs, “Nakakabaliw” and “Must Have”.

=== 2007–2010: Animax, Wild Life ===
In 2007, the band were commissioned to write a new theme song for Animax. They recorded two songs, “Matador” and “Set Me Apart”, with the latter being chosen. It was released in May 2007 with an animated music video premiering the following month. The video later won Best Music Video at the PromaxBDA Awards the following year. "Set Me Apart" also became Jugo’s last song with the band, as he left soon after.

The band added drummer Wendell Garcia of Barbie's Cradle to their lineup and released their second studio album Wild Life in November. It featured the singles "Sala", "Monobloc", "Teacher's Pet", and "Disconnection Notice". It was later rereleased as a special edition with bonus tracks in 2009.

The band opened for Nine Inch Nails in Manila on their Wave Goodbye tour in August 2009. They also recorded the theme song for the 2009 film Ang Panday, with a music video directed by Ventura.

In May 2010, the band released a book, Against the Light: A Pupil Tour Diary. They also opened for Tears for Fears with Buendia’s former bandmate Raimund Marasigan’s band Sandwich in the same month. The band contributed to Buendia’s collaborative album with rapper Francis M., In Love and War, released in 2010 after his death.

=== 2011–2013: Limiters of the Infinity Pool ===
The band released their third album Limiters of the Infinity Pool in January 2011. It features the singles “TNT” and “20/20”, of which a music video was shot on the empty streets of EDSA during Holy Week.

After Sony Music Philippines disbanded in 2012, Pupil signed with MCA Music. The band performed with General Luna at Dubai, United Arab Emirates in February 2013. Yuzon left the band soon after.

=== 2014–present: Zilch, hiatus ===
In 2014, Velasco officially joined the band as lead guitarist. He had previously worked with the band on their first two albums. The band released the first single from their upcoming album Zilch titled “Out of Control” in July. Its music video was directed by Erin Pascual and featured model Ornusa Cadness in a post-apocalyptic Manila. The band represented the Philippines at the annual Sundown Festival in Singapore on November.

Zilch was released in March 2015. Its follow-up singles included “Why” and “Cheap Thrill”.

The band was slated to perform at De La Salle University in June 2016, but later backed out after Buendia felt that the organizers "acted in bad faith" by promoting him instead of his band. In March 2019, the band performed with General Luna in Parañaque.

After a five-year hiatus, the band reunited for a live show with Sandwich and Chicosci in March 2024.

== Members ==
=== Current members ===
- Ely Buendia - vocals, rhythm guitar (2005–2019, 2024–present)
- Dok Sergio - bass, vocals (2005–2019, 2024–present)
- Wendell Garcia - drums, vocals (2007–2019, 2024–present)
- Jerome Velasco - lead guitar (2014–2019, 2024–present)

=== Former members ===
- Yanni Yuzon - lead guitar, vocals (2005–2013)
- Bogs Jugo - drums, vocals (2005–2007)

== Discography ==
=== Studio albums ===
| Title | Album details |
|---|---|
| Beautiful Machines | Released: November 11, 2005; Label: Sony BMG Music Entertainment; Format: CD |
| Wild Life | Released: November 9, 2007; Label: Sony BMG Music Entertainment (Philippines), Inc.; Format: CD |
| Limiters of the Infinity Pool | Released: January 19, 2011; Label: Sony Music Philippines; Format: CD |
| Zilch | Released: March 6, 2015; Label: MCA Music; Format: CD |

=== Extended plays ===
- Juicy Fruit Rockoustic Mania (with Barbie Almalbis) (Sony BMG Entertainment (Philippines), 2006)

=== Singles ===
List of singles, showing year released and album name
| Title | Year | Album |
|---|---|---|
| "Nasaan Ka?" | 2005 | Beautiful Machines |
| "Dianetic" | 2006 | Beautiful Machines |
| "Dulo Ng Dila" | 2006 | Beautiful Machines |
| "Gamu-Gamo" | 2006 | Beautiful Machines |
| "Set Me Apart" | 2007 | Wild Life |
| "Sala" | 2007 | Wild Life |
| "Monobloc" | 2008 | Wild Life |
| "Teacher's Pet" | 2009 | Wild Life |
| "Disconnection Notice" | 2009 | Wild Life |
| "TNT" | 2011 | Limiters of the Infinity Pool |
| "20/20" | 2011 | Limiters of the Infinity Pool |
| "Out of Control" | 2014 | Zilch |
| "Why" | 2015 | Zilch |
| "Cheap Thrill" | 2016 | Zilch |

=== Other appearances ===
| Title | Year | Album |
|---|---|---|
| "Blow Your House Down" | 2005 | Hoodwinked (Original Motion Picture Soundtrack) |
| "Bleeder" | 2010 | In Love and War |

=== Music videos ===
| Year | Title | Director |
|---|---|---|
| 2005 | "Nasaan Ka?" | Quark Henares |
| 2005 | "Dianetic" | |
| 2006 | "Dulo Ng Dila" | Wincy Ong and King Palisoc |
| 2006 | "Nakakabaliw" | R.A. Rivera |
| 2006 | "Must Have" | Pancho Esguerra |
| 2007 | ”Set Me Apart” | Tracy Wong |
| 2007 | "Sala" | Wincy Ong |
| 2008 | "Monobloc" | King Palisoc |
| 2009 | "Teacher's Pet" | King Palisoc |
| 2009 | "Disconnection Notice" | Quark Henares |
| 2009 | "Different Worlds (Live)" | |
| 2009 | "Ang Panday" | Diane Ventura |
| 2011 | "TNT" | |
| 2011 | "20/20" | Jason Tan |
| 2014 | "Out of Control" | Erin Pascual |
| 2015 | "Why" | Mike Talampas and Nick Santiago |
| 2016 | "Cheap Thrill" | Erin Pascual |

== Awards and nominations ==
| Year | Award giving body | Category | Nominated work | Results |
|---|---|---|---|---|
| 2006 | Awit Awards | Best Performance By A New Group | Pupil | Won |
| 2006 | MTV Pilipinas | Best Rock Video Award | "Nasaan Ka?" | Won |
| 2006 | MTV Pilipinas | Best Director | Quark Henares for "Nasaan Ka?" | Won |
| 2006 | NU Rock Awards | Bassist of The Year | Dok Sergio | Nominated |
| 2006 | NU Rock Awards | Producer/s of The Year | Patrick Tirano (Beautiful Machines) | Nominated |
| 2006 | NU Rock Awards | Song of The Year | "Nasaan Ka?" | Nominated |
| 2006 | NU Rock Awards | Band of The Year | Pupil | Nominated |
| 2006 | NU Rock Awards | Album of The Year | "Beautiful Machines" | Nominated |
| 2006 | SOP | Breakthrough Recording Artist of The Year | Pupil | Won |
| 2006 | SOP | Best Vocalist (Pasiklaband Awards) | Ely Buendia | Nominated |
| 2006 | SOP | Best Rock Band (Pasiklaband Awards) | Pupil | Nominated |
| 2007 | Awit Awards | Music Video of The Year | "Dulo Ng Dila" | Nominated |
| 2007 | MYX Music Awards | Favorite Media Soundtrack | "Nakakabaliw" with Barbie Almalbis for Juicy Fruit Rockoustic Mania | Nominated |
| 2007 | NU Rock Awards | Song of The Year | "Sala" | Nominated |
| 2007 | OPM Songhits Awards | Best Performance by a Group/Band | Pupil | Nominated |
| 2007 | OPM Songhits Awards | Best Male Vocalist | Ely Buendia | Won |
| 2007 | OPM Songhits Awards | Best Song for a Movie/TV/Stage play | "Set Me Apart" | Nominated |
| 2007 | OPM Songhits Awards | Rock Icon Award | Ely Buendia | Won |
| 2008 | Awit Awards | Best Performance By A Group Recording Artist/s (Performance Award) | "Sala" | Nominated |
| 2008 | Awit Awards | Best Performance By A Group Recording Artist/s (People's Choice Award) | "Sala" | Nominated |
| 2008 | Awit Awards | Best Rock Recording | "Sala" | Nominated |
| 2008 | Awit Awards | Best World/Alternative/Bossa Music | "Sala" | Nominated |
| 2008 | NU Rock Awards | Producer Of The Year | Jerome Velasco (Wild Life) | Won |
| 2008 | NU Rock Awards | Drummer Of The Year | Wendell Garcia | Won |
| 2008 | NU Rock Awards | Album Of The Year | Wild Life | Won |
| 2008 | NU Rock Awards | Artist Of The Year | Pupil | Won |
| 2008 | NU Rock Awards | Best Music Video | "Monobloc" | Won |
| 2008 | NU Rock Awards | Vocalist of the Year | Ely Buendia | Nominated |
| 2008 | NU Rock Awards | Bassist of The Year | Dok Sergio | Nominated |
| 2008 | NU Rock Awards | Song of the Year | "Monobloc" | Nominated |
| 2008 | Promax/BDA Awards (New York City) | Best Music Video | "Set Me Apart" | Won |
| 2008 | SOP | Best Rock Band (Pasiklaband Awards) | Pupil | Won |
| 2009 | NU Rock Awards | Song of The Year | "Different Worlds" (Live Version) | Nominated |
| 2009 | NU Rock Awards | Song of The Year | "Teacher's Pet" | Nominated |
| 2009 | NU Rock Awards | Best Music Video | "Teacher's Pet" Directed by King Palisoc | Nominated |
| 2012 | MYX Music Awards | Favorite Music Video | "20/20" Directed by Jason Tan | Won |
| 2012 | MYX Music Awards | Favorite Song | "20/20" | Nominated |
| 2012 | MYX Music Awards | Favorite Rock Video | "20/20" Directed by Jason Tan | Nominated |
| 2012 | Awit Awards | Music Video of the Year | "20/20" Directed by Jason Tan | Won |
| 2012 | Awit Awards | Best Engineered Recording | Patrick Tirano | Nominated |
| 2015 | MYX Music Awards | Favorite Rock Video | "Out of Control" Directed by Erin Pascual | Nominated |
| 2016 | MYX Music Awards | Favorite Rock Video | "Why" Directed by Mike Talampas and Nick Santiago | Nominated |
