= Barbie's Cradle =

Philippine alternative rock band

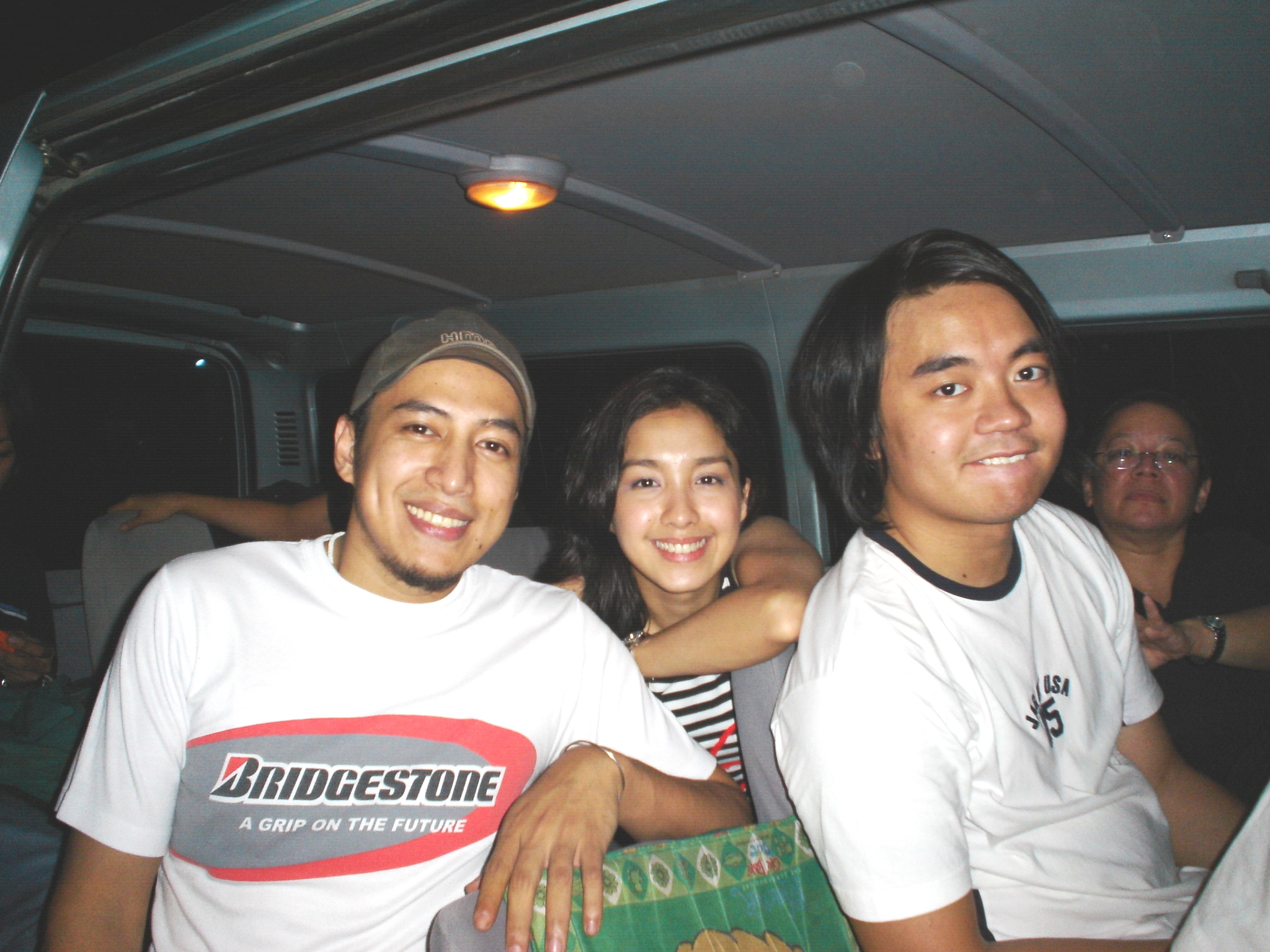
- Drummer Wendell Garcia, vocalist Barbie Almalbis, and guitarist Kakoi Legaspi after Barbie's Cradle's performance at the 2005 Febfair at UP Los Baños.

Background information
- Origin: Manila, Philippines
- Genres: Alternative rock, pop rock
- Years active: 1998–2005
- Labels: Warner Music Philippines
- Past members: Barbie Almalbis, Ricci Gurango, Franklin Benitez, Wendell Garcia, Rommel dela Cruz, Kakoi Legaspi

Barbie's Cradle was a Filipino alternative rock band, formed in 1998 by the remaining members of Barbie Almalbis' previous band, Hungry Young Poets, and disbanded in 2005 when Almalbis took up a solo career. The band released three albums, Barbie's Cradle, Music from the Buffet Table, and Playing in the Fields, the last two of which featured lyrics notable for their Christian-oriented content, brought about by personal changes in the life of songwriter Almalbis.

Aside from Almalbis, members over the years included Rommel de la Cruz who played bass throughout the band's existence; drummers Franklin Benitez and Wendell Garcia, who were part of the band before and after the release of Music from the Buffet Table respectively, and Kakoi Legaspi, who took up a second guitar position just prior to the band's dissolution in 2005.

== Origins ==
The first incarnation, called Hungry Young Poets started as a duo in 1997 by Barbie Almalbis (guitarist, vocalist, and songwriter) and Ricci Gurango (bassist). After releasing their only self-titled album, Franklin Benitez (drummer) would officially complete the trio.

In 1998, Gurango left the band to lead cover band, Little Green Men, before forming MOJOFLY. With Gurango's assertion of rights to the band's name, Almalbis and Benitez would later rename the group, Barbie's Cradle.

== Albums and lineup over the years ==
The band's original lineup consisted of Barbie Almalbis on vocals and guitar, Franklin Benitez on drums, and Rommel De La Cruz on Bass. This was the lineup that performed at a Manila show by Sixpence None The Richer and which recorded the song "Tabing Ilog" to serve as the title song for an afternoon soap opera of the same name. Soon after, the band would release their Eponymous first album, Barbie's Cradle in late 1999.

Drummer Franklin Benitez would leave the band before the release in 2000 of the band's second album, Music from the Buffet Table. Some of the tracks on that album were thus performed by Benitez, and some by Wendell Garcia. That album would be significant for introducing the Christian-themed lyrics that would be Barbie's Cradle's trademark until its disbandment, and of Barbie Almalbis as a solo artist thereafter.

The trio of Almalbis, De La Cruz, and Garcia, with their now-distinctive spiritually influenced songs, released Playing in the Fields in 2003.

In 2005, Rivermaya guitarist Kakoi Legaspi left that group to become part of Barbie's Cradle. Almalbis, however, decided to take up a solo career, which meant that no full Barbie's Cradle album would be made with the addition of Legaspi's guitar performance. The new Barbie's Cradle sound, with Legaspi's contribution, however, can be heard in the "Good Day" track which was released in Barbie: The Singles, a compilation album released in 2005 featuring songs by Hungry Young Poets, Barbie's Cradle, and Almalbis as a solo artist.

== After Barbie's Cradle ==
The band had one last performance as one of the performers at a benefit concert for the Philippine National Red Cross, in UP Diliman's Bahay ng Alumni.

After Almalbis left the band in 2005 to pursue a solo career, the other members of the group eventually took up positions in other bands. Rommel De La Cruz would take up the post of bass player in Freestyle, Wendell Garcia became the drummer for Pupil, and Kakoi Legaspi would be one of the founders of Salindiwa. Franklin Benitez worked with Almalbis again, taking up the drums for Almalbis' later albums as a solo artist.

== Discography ==
- 1999 - Barbie's Cradle
- 2000 - Music from the Buffet Table
- 2003 - Playing in the Fields

== Awards and nominations ==
Year	Award giving body	Category	Nominated work	Results
1999	New Artist Awards Festival (99.5RT)	Best New Pop-Alternative Artist	—N/a	Won
2000	Awit Awards	Best Album Packaging	"Barbie's Cradle"	Won
2000	Katha Awards	Best Alternative Song	"Goodnyt"	Won
2000	Katha Awards	Best Album Packaging	"Barbie's Cradle"	Won
2001	Katha Awards	Best Electronica Composition	"Up and at 'Em"	Won
2001	Katha Awards	Best Folk Song	"Dear Paul"	Won
2001	Katha Awards	Best Folk Vocal Performance	"Dear Paul"	Won
2001	NU Rock Awards	Best Music Video	"Money for Food"	Won
2001	NU Rock Awards	Artist of the Year	—N/a	Nominated
2001	NU Rock Awards	Album of the Year	"Music from the Buffet Table"	Nominated
2001	NU Rock Awards	Vocalist of the Year	(for Barbie Almalbis)	Nominated
2001	NU Rock Awards	Bassist of the Year	(for Rommel dela Cruz)	Nominated
2003	NU Rock Awards	Bassist of the Year	(for Rommel dela Cruz)	Won
2003	NU Rock Awards	Producer of the Year	"Playing in the Fields"	Won
