= Teeth (Filipino band) =

Filipino grunge band, active from 1992

- Origin: Manila, Philippines
- Genres: Alternative rock; grunge; shoegaze
- Years active: 1993–2003; 2014–present
- Labels: Warner Music Philippines; Soupstar Entertainment
- Members: Glenn Jacinto; Jerome Velasco; Andrew "Dok" Sergio; Pedz Narvaja; Mike Dizon

Teeth is a Filipino rock band formed in 1993. The band is currently composed of Glenn Jacinto on vocals, Jerome Velasco on guitars, Pedz Narvaja on bass, Mike Dizon on drums, and Dok Sergio on guitars (formerly on bass). Their music style is described as a mix of alternative rock and grunge, with some shoegaze influences evident in their third full-length album, I Was A Teenage Tree. The band is well known for the hits, "Laklak", "Prinsesa" and "Shooting Star".

== History ==
=== Formation and mainstream success (1993–2003) ===
The Filipino grunge band Teeth was born during the alternative rock boom of the 1990s and exploded onto the airwaves with "Laklak", a tale of youthful excess that became an anthem for drinking. The track topped the charts of the Philippines' adventurous alternative rock station LA-105 for 12 weeks. Teeth was formed in September 1993 by Glenn Jacinto (vocals), Jerome Velasco (guitars), Peding Narvaja (bass), and Mike Dizon (drums). Narvaja, Velasco, and Dizon were originally in a group called Riftshifta, while Jacinto was in Loudhouse. Signed to Warner Music Philippines, Teeth released their self-titled debut album in 1995; the LP went double-platinum. "Laklak" was re-recorded and crossed over into the mainstream, stirring controversy with its alcohol-fueled lyrics; it was voted Song of the Year at the 1995 NU 107 Rock Awards.

The video for Teeth's second single "Prinsesa" directed by Odin Fernandez was even played on MTV Asia. However, in 1996 Jacinto was hospitalized for a lung ailment; his illness left him unable to promote the album or fulfill concert dates for a year. In 1997, Jacinto recovered and Teeth recorded Time Machine. Although the alternative rock scene in Manila had begun to wane. When Narvaja left Teeth to move to the U.S., he was replaced by Andrew Sergio. In 1999, the band released I Was a Teenage Tree. The album contained the single "Shooting Star", which was awarded Song of the Year at the NU 107 Rock Awards in 2000.

=== Hiatus (2003–2014) ===
In 2003, their greatest hits album Dogs Can Fly (Teeth's Finest) was released. After the release, they went on a hiatus to focus on other musical ventures. Mike Dizon co-founded Sandwich in 1998 with Eraserheads’ drummer Raimund Marasigan; and later in 2005, Pedicab. Frontman Glenn Jacinto moved to California and he still performs regularly there. Also during 2003, former-Eraserheads frontman Ely Buendia formed The Mongols with Teeth’s Guitarist Jerome Velasco which was later joined by Teeth’s bassist (later second guitarist) Dok Sergio. As Jerome Velasco left The Mongols in 2005 to pursue a career in audio engineering and recording, it was later renamed into Pupil. Meanwhile, Jerome Velasco remained as a co-writer and producer for Pupil’s Beautiful Machines song from the album of the same name. He is also the chief musical producer for Pupil’s second album. Jerome and Dok are both members of the dreampop/electronica band, Daydream Cycle with The Mongols’/Pupil's Bogs Jugo and Rivermaya’s Japs Sergio. Sergio also sings Teeth songs with his current band, Pupil.

During the hiatus in around 2007, the band became semi-active and occasionally performs live without Jacinto and usually Dok Sergio takes the singing duties and sometimes other artists also take sessions as main vocals such as Ebe Dancel of Sugarfree.

=== Reunion (2014–present) ===
On May 15, 2014, the band reunited after 10 years of hiatus. For the first time, the band brought back Pedz Narvaja as bassist while Dok Sergio switched to guitars, thus making a five-piece line up. They performed a reunion concert at Metro Tent in Pasig. They later went on to perform several reunion shows in 2015. As of 2016, the band continued their other ventures as Jacinto and Narvaja are currently based in the United States, while Sergio and Velasco performs with Pupil and Dizon still plays drums with Sandwich and Pedicab.

== Members ==
Current members

- Glenn Jacinto - lead vocals, guitar (1993-2003, 2014-present)
- Jerome Velasco - guitar, backing vocals (1993-2003, 2014-present)
- Andrew "Dok" Sergio - guitar, backing vocals (2014–present), bass (1997-2003)
- Pedz Narvaja - bass (1993-1997, 2014–present)
- Mike Dizon - drums, percussion (1993-2003, 2014–present)

== Discography ==
Studio albums

- Teeth (1995)
- Time Machine (1997)
- I Was A Teenage Tree (1999)

Extended plays

- Bum Squad (1997)

Compilations

- Teeth - The Greatest Hits (2001)
- Dogs Can Fly - The Best of Teeth (2003)

== Awards ==
Year	Award giving body	Category	Nominated work	Results
1995	NU Rock Awards	Song of the Year	"Laklak"	Won
1998	NU Rock Awards	Album of the Year	"Time Machine"	Nominated
1998	NU Rock Awards	Best Album Packaging	"Time Machine"	Nominated
1998	NU Rock Awards	Drummer of the Year	(for Mike Dizon)	Nominated
2000	NU Rock Awards	Song of the Year	"Shooting Star"	Won
2000	NU Rock Awards	Drummer of the Year	(for Mike Dizon)	Won
2000	NU Rock Awards	Album of the Year	"I Was a Teenage Tree"	Nominated
2001	"MTV Pilipinas Music Award"	Favorite Group Video	"Shooting Star"	Nominated
2001	"MTV Pilipinas Music Award"	Video of the Year	"Shooting Star"	Nominated
