= Hilera =

Filipino rock band

- Origin: San Juan City, Philippines
- Genres: Pinoy rock, alternative rock, pop-punk, rockabilly
- Years active: 2004–present
- Label: PolyEast Records
- Members: Chris Padilla; Bobby Padilla; Luke Xavier Bayhon; Jeroy Padilla
- Past members: JC Tayag; Ivan Garcia; Buddy Zabala; Conrad Javier

Hilera is a Filipino rock band formed in December 2004. Originally a three-piece band, it currently consists of Chris Padilla, Bobby Padilla and Luke Xavier Bayhon.

== Formation ==
In February 2004, bandmates Chris Padilla and Ivan Garcia decided to form their own three-piece band. After months of searching, Padilla's brother Bobby was showing potential with his drumming skills. They decided to move forward with their lineup, and in December 2004 Hilera was officially formed.

The band joined the Nescafe Soundskool Battle of the Bands in 2005. The young band won the top spot and scored a recording contract with EMI Philippines. and release their first self titled debut album on October 30, 2006. Since then, the band has been very active and has been nominated at various award shows such as the NU Rock Awards, Myx Music Awards, IFM Pinoy Music Awards, and SOP (Pasiklaband).

On March 11, 2009, the band released their 2nd album "Nut House" features their carrier single "Radical"

In late 2015 Ivan Garcia left the band for personal reasons. He was later replaced by former Eraserheads and The Dawn bassist, Buddy Zabala. The band also announced that their upcoming album would be released in 2016.

On 2018, the band released a 6 track EP titled "The Other Way Around"

== Musical style ==
Their style of music is a mix of punk rock, alternative rock, and rockabilly. Padilla and Garcia had a fascination with metal and other genres starting out. However, listening to bands like The Clash, Green Day and the Stray Cats defined the band's musical direction.

== Discography ==
=== Studio albums ===
Album title	Tracks	Year	Released by
Hilera	Rhyme Without Reason; The Pot Of Gold; Pass The Walls; Define; Lies In The Head; Dehado; Up The Heavens; All Of This; Pilit; Sun Grass; Nothing New; Smiles And Fades	2006	PolyEast Records
NutHouse	Stop The Fight; Not This Time; Ded Ded Ded; Radical; It's A Crime; Another Face; No Lizard King; Murder; I'll Get By; So Be It; Floating In A Freewall; Wala Akong Alam; Stop Looking At Me; Protest; It All Ends; Doo Wop Pop	2009	PolyEast Records
Kid In A Coma	Kid In A Coma; Armageddon Time; Blackout! No Future; Bad Boy; Going Nowhere; It Sucks; Outcast; Dead End Street; Hypocrite; World On Fire; Who's Gonna Save Us Now?	2010	PsychoLab Records

=== Compilations ===
- Kami nAPO Muna Ulit (Universal Records, 2007)
- In Love and War (Sony Records, 2010)
- The Reunion: An Eraserheads Tribute Album (Star Records, 2012)

== Band members ==
- Chris Padilla – lead vocals, guitars (2004–present)
- Bobby Padilla – drums, percussion (2004–present)
- Luke Xavier Bayhon – bass guitar, backing vocals (2020–present)

=== Former members ===
- Ivan Garcia – bass guitar, upright bass, backing vocals (2004–2015)
- Buddy Zabala – bass guitar, backing vocals (2015–2019)
- Conrad Javier – bass guitar, backing vocals (2019–2020)
- JC Tayag – guitars, bass guitar, backing vocals (2020–2023)

== Awards and nominations ==
Year	Award-giving body	Category	Nominated work	Results
2005	Nescafe Soundskool	Grand Champion	—N/a	Won
2007	iFM Pinoy Music Awards	Song of the Year	"Pilit"	Won
2007	MYX Music Awards	Favorite New Artist	—N/a	Nominated
2007	NU Rock Awards	Best New Artist	—N/a	Won
2007	NU Rock Awards	Bassist of the Year	(for Ivan Garcia)	Nominated
2007	NU Rock Awards	Best Live Act	—N/a	Nominated
2008	MYX Music Awards	Favorite Remake	"Mahirap Magmahal ng Syota ng Iba"	Nominated
2008	SOP Pasiklaband	Breakthrough Artist	—N/a	Nominated
2009	NU Rock Awards	Best Live Act	—N/a	Won
2009	NU Rock Awards	Bassist of the Year	(for Ivan Garcia)	Won
2009	NU Rock Awards	Video of the Year	"Radical"	Nominated
2009	NU Rock Awards	Producer of the Year	"NutHouse"	Nominated
2009	NU Rock Awards	Best Album Packaging	(Timothy Wong for "NutHouse")	Nominated
2009	NU Rock Awards	Drummer of the Year	(for Bobby Padilla)	Nominated
2009	NU Rock Awards	Guitarist of the Year	(for Chris Padilla)	Nominated
2009	NU Rock Awards	Vocalist of the Year	(for Chris Padilla)	Nominated
2009	NU Rock Awards	Album of the Year	"NutHouse"	Nominated
2009	NU Rock Awards	Artist of the Year	—N/a	Nominated
2010	MYX Music Awards	Favorite Rock Video	"Radical"	Nominated
2010	MYX Music Awards	Favorite Music Video	"Radical"	Nominated

== Other media ==
=== Sponsors and endorsements ===
- Draven Shoes
- PRS Guitars

== Sources ==
- Official website
- Facebook
- MYX profile
- Philippine Star article
- Draven profile

Awards
Preceded by Up dharma Down	NU Rock Awards; Best New Artist; 2007	Succeeded by The Out of Body Special
