= Yanni Yuzon =

Filipino musician (born 1978)

- Birth name: Yan Yrastorza Yuzon
- Also known as: Yani/Yanni
- Born: March 7, 1978 (age 47); Philippines
- Origin: Philippines
- Genres: Alternative rock Pop rock OPM
- Instrument(s): Vocals, Guitar, Bass guitar, Keyboard
- Years active: 2000–present
- Labels: Sony Music (2005–present)
- Member of: Archipelago
- Formerly of: Pupil

Yan "Yanni" Yrastorza Yuzon (born March 7, 1978), is a Filipino singer, musician, writer, director, and acting coach best known as the former guitarist of the band Pupil. He was also the lead vocalist and guitarist for the band, Archipelago. A former theater professor at Ateneo de Manila University, he has also had leading roles in Tanghalang Ateneo productions, as well as writing and directing several of their plays.

== Personal life ==
Yuzon is the older brother of Sponge Cola guitarist and frontman, Yael Yuzon. The Yuzons are of Filipino and Basque descent. He is the older child of Johnny Yuzon (father) and Elsa Yuzon (mother) with middle brother Yael and younger sister Ysabel. The Yuzons are also related to actress and singer Donna Cruz, as she is their first cousin. He and his siblings attended Ateneo de Manila University from grade school to college. Their father, a public accountant, taught them how to play the guitar, but initially wasn't supportive of them pursuing a career in music. He graduated from Ateneo with a degree in AB Social Science. After graduating, he held a job at a call center for five months before becoming a theater teacher and musician.

== Career ==
=== As musician ===
==== With The Mongols and Pupil ====
In high school, Yuzon played in Ateneo's band, Tungaw. He was also a bassist and vocalist for the pop rock band Lilian. In 2003, Ely Buendia, who had just left the band Eraserheads, formed a new band with Yuzon on bass, guitarist Jerome Velasco from Teeth, and drummer Bogs Jugo. They produced one album together.

When guitarist Velasco left the band to study in the US in 2005, the band recruited Dok Sergio, who swapped duties with Yuzon. With Sergio, they decided to rename themselves as Pupil. He and Buendia were the guitarists and vocalists for Pupil. He was with Pupil on their first three albums. In 2013, he left the band.

==== With Archipelago ====
In 2004, Yuzon and Pat Tirano (of TOI) launched their own band called Archipelago. Its members were Wendell Garcia on drums, Chad Rialp on bass, Tirano on lead guitars, and Yuzon himself on front man duties. He directed the music video for their song "Gaan".

==== Other music ventures ====
Yuzon was featured in an instrumental compilation called "Mga Gitarista" ("The Guitarists"), wherein it features various instrumental songs from Filipino guitarists from different OPM bands such as Barbie Almalbis, Francis Reyes, Mong Alcaraz and Mike Elgar.

In 2008, he produced Sponge Cola's self-titled album, which was certified gold. He also produced their album Transit, which was certified platinum, and directed their music video for "Kay Tagal Kang Hinintay", which won Best Mellow Video at the 2012 MYX Music Awards.

Yuzon also taught music. In 2020, Yuzon held an online guitar tutorial in which he taught actor Dingdong Dantes.

=== As actor ===
Since the age of 12, Yuzon starred in plays from Tanghalang Ateneo and Dulaang UP. In 2006, he starred in the role of Romeo in the Metropolitan Theater Guild's production of Romeo and Juliet alongside Ina Feleo (a former student of his) as Juliet. He had previously appeared in local renditions of other Shakespearean plays like The Merchant of Venice and Filipino original plays such as Kahapon, Ngayon, at Bukas. He also starred in an indie film titled "Three Boys" for Cinemanila. The film is about a band which is composed of himself, Marc Abaya, and Ping Medina. It was directed by Ming Kai Leung and produced by Marie Jamora.

In 2021, Yuzon joined the cast of Almost Paradise, an American series shot in the Philippines. In 2022, he joined the cast of I Can See You: AlterNate. In 2021, Yuzon returned to the Tanghalang Ateneo where he starred in a modern-day adaptation of Oedipus Rex alongside Marian Rivera. In 2024, he starred in their productions of Mga Multo and Medea.

=== As theater practitioner and teacher ===
In high school, Yuzon wrote Linya, a one-act play that became so popular that it was included in the curriculum of several schools. He also taught theater direction at the Ateneo de Manila University. From 1998 to 2005, he also directed several of their plays, including a pop-culture adaptation of Bertolt Brecht's The Threepenny Opera, and Santuario. He then headed an acting workshop for GMA artists alongside director Maryo J. Delos Reyes and Chynna Ortaleza. His students throughout his teaching career include Ina Foleo and Mikee Quintos.

=== As writer and director ===
Yuzon also wrote screenplays and poems, and was a director. Before joining Buendia's band, he was the associate editor for FWD Magazine. He was also a writer for ABS-CBN's TV show Goin' Bulilit. In 2014, he directed Aso't, Pusa, Daga in the anthology film Bang Bang Alley. In 2016, he was a writer on the drama Someone to Watch Over Me. A poem that he wrote, "Maliit na Bagay" (Small Things) was featured in a 2020 short film that was directed by Dantes and starred his wife Marian Rivera.

== Filmography ==
=== TV Shows ===
- Goin' Bulilit – TV writer (2005–2019)
- Protégé: The Battle for the Big Artista Break – acting coach (2012)
- Someone to Watch Over Me – writer (2016)
- Almost Paradise (2021)
- I Can See You: AlterNate – Darwin Trinidad (2022)

=== Film ===
- Bang Bang Alley – Director (2014)

== Discography ==
=== With Pupil ===
Albums

- Beautiful Machines (2005)
- Wildlife (2007)
- Limiters of the Indefinite Pool (2011)

=== With Archipelago ===
Albums

- Travel Advisory (2009)

== Singles ==
=== With The Mongols ===
- It's Over

=== With Pupil ===
- Nasaan ka?
- Dianetic
- Nakakabaliw
- Gamu-Gamo
- Set Me Apart
- Dulo ng Dila
- Sala
- Monobloc
- Disconnection Notice
- Teacher's Pet
- Different Worlds
- One Two

=== With Archipelago ===
- MRI
- May 1
- Black Box
