= Barbie Almalbis =

Philippine singer-songwriter

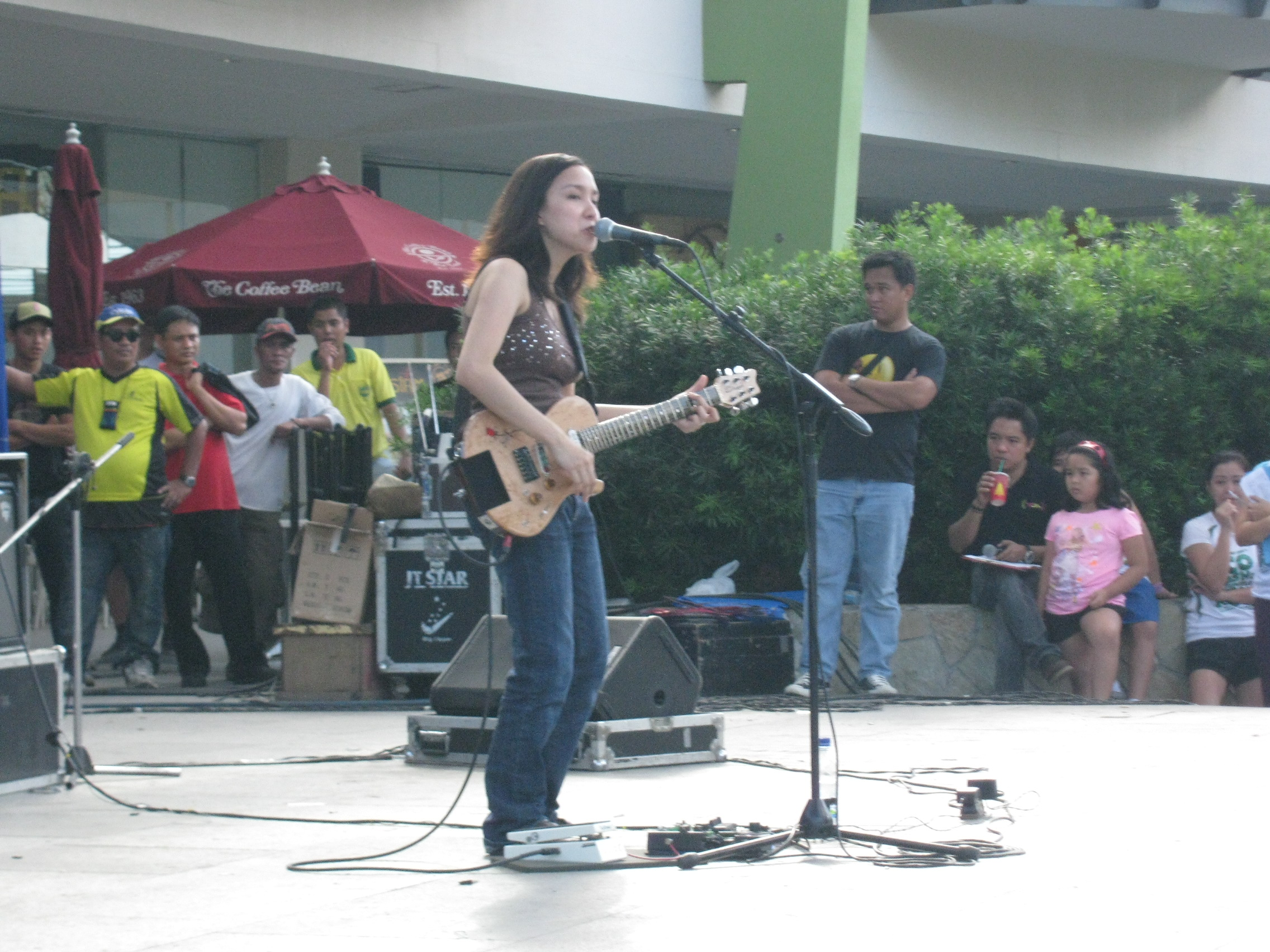
- Barbie Almalbis performing at the Ayala Center Cebu's Eco Dash: The Bottle School Run

Background information
- Born: Yvette Barbra Hontiveros Almalbis; August 26, 1977 (age 48)
- Origin: Roxas City, Capiz, Philippines
- Genres: Acoustic, pop rock, alternative rock
- Occupations: Singer, songwriter, guitarist
- Instruments: Vocals, guitar, piano
- Years active: 1996–present
- Labels: 12 Stone Records; Warner Music Philippines; Star Music
- Formerly of: Hungry Young Poets; Barbie's Cradle
- Website: www.barbiealmalbis.com

Yvette Barbra Hontiveros Almalbis (born August 26, 1977), better known as Barbie Almalbis, is a Filipino singer, songwriter and guitarist.

She is the niece of broadcast journalist Pia Hontiveros, current Philippine senator Risa Hontiveros, and singer Leah Navarro.

Formerly the lead singer of the bands Hungry Young Poets and Barbie's Cradle, she pursued a solo career in 2005, releasing her self-titled compilation album, Barbie: The Singles.

In 2006, she released her debut solo album, Parade. Her music is characterised by a rather quirky, but endearing vocal style, and guitar work.

In 2016, she was chosen to interpret Nica del Rosario's composition "Ambon" at the 2016 edition of Himig Handog: P-Pop Love Songs.

== Discography ==
=== By Hungry Young Poets ===
- Torpe
- Firewoman
- Panahon
- Maniwala ka
- Clear
- Runaway
- Radio
- Stars
- Deep
- Personal Flirt
- Rebirth
- Drowning

=== By Barbie's Cradle ===
- Tabing Ilog (soundtrack for ABS-CBN's Tabing Ilog; covered by Jireh Lim)
- The Dance
- Goodnyt
- Shiny Red Balloon
- Belinda Bye Bye
- Dear Paul
- Money for Food
- Langit Na Naman (Original by Hotdog Band)
- Pangarap
- All I Need
- Limang Dipang Tao (by Ryan Cayabyab, first popularized by Lea Salonga)
- Everyday
- Idlip
- Independence Day
- Good Day (soundtrack for Nescafe)

=== By Barbie Almalbis ===
- Just a Smile (soundtrack for Close-Up's TV Commercial)
- Power over You (soundtrack for SkinWhite TV Commercial)
- You're My Number One (soundtrack for Nido commercial with Sharon Cuneta)
- "Summer Day (soundtrack for Sunsilk TV commercial).

=== Parade (2006) ===
Parade

Studio album by Barbie Almalbis
- Released: 2006
- Genre: OPM
- Labels: 12 Stone Records, Warner Music

Barbie Almalbis chronology
Parade (2006)	Goodbye My Shadow (2011)

- Dahilan
- Give Yourself Away
- Overdrive (first popularized by the Eraserheads)
- Damsel
- Sorry Song
- Parading
- Little Miss Spider
- High (duet with The Speaks)
- Summer Day
- Pag-alis
- For the World
- 012 (with Rommel dela Cruz, Wendell Garcia, and Kakoy Legaspi)
- Credits Song

=== Barbie Rocks The Big Dome – Live (2007) ===
- Torpe
- Deadma (with Rocksteddy)
- Smile at Me (Rocksteddy)
- Tabing Ilog
- High (with Ney Dimaculangan)
- Just a Smile
- Majika (Kitchie Nadal)
- Firewoman (with Kitchie Nadal)
- Same Ground (Kitchie Nadal)
- Untitled (Harana Song)
- Dahilan
- Parading
- You Learn (with Mom)
- Summerday
- Goodnight
- 012

=== Goodbye My Shadow (2011) ===
Goodbye My Shadow

Studio album by Barbie Almalbis
- Released: 2011
- Genres: OPM, CCM
- Labels: 12 Stone Records, Star Music

Barbie Almalbis chronology
Parade (2006)	Goodbye My Shadow (2011)	My New Heart (2014)

- Ostrich Cowboy
- Goodbye My Shadow
- Constellations
- Unraveling
- Always You
- No Police
- Lights
- Where Have You Been?
- Child of Mine
- Wait til Sunday
- Buntala

=== My New Heart (2014) ===
My New Heart

Studio album by Barbie Almalbis
- Released: 2014
- Genres: OPM, CCM
- Labels: 12 Stone Records, Star Music

Barbie Almalbis chronology
Goodbye My Shadow (2011)	My New Heart (2014)

- Say Goodbye
- Emmanuel
- Run For Cover
- My New Heart
- Secrets
- Joyful, Joyful (Cover Music)
- We Are Slaves
- On This Train
- Ostrich Cowboy (2014 Edition)

=== Scenes From Inside (2021) ===
Scenes From Inside

Studio album by Barbie Almalbis
- Released: 2021
- Genre: OPM

Barbie Almalbis chronology
My New Heart (2014)	Scenes From Inside (2021)

- Kumpas
- Peace Where We Go
- Days Are Long
- An Aspin’s Song (For Tata)
- Iyong-iyo
- Comment
- Umagang Kay Ganda
- Silaw
- Cover (Acoustic Version)

=== Not That Girl (2025) ===
Not That Girl

Studio album by Barbie Almalbis
- Released: 2025
- Genre: OPM

Barbie Almalbis chronology
Scenes From Inside (2021)	Not That Girl (2025)

- Desperate Hours
- Homeostasis
- Happy Sad
- Platonic
- All U Wanna Do
- How To Weep
- Not That Girl
- Needy
- Wicked Heart

== Collaborations ==
- Tunog Acoustic (Warner Music Philippines, 2003) (with Barbie's Cradle)
- Supersize Rock (Warner Music Philippines, 2004) (with Barbie's Cradle)
- Tunog Acoustic 2 (Warner Music Philippines, 2004) (with Barbie's Cradle)
- Tunog Acoustic 3 (Warner Music Philippines, 2004)
- Ultraelectromagneticjam (Sony BMG Music Philippines, 2005)
- Tunog Acoustic 4 (Warner Music Philippines, 2004) (with The Speaks)
- Bandang Pinoy, Lasang Hotdog (Sony BMG Music Philippines, 2006)
- Kami nAPO muna (Universal Records, 2006)
- I-Star 15: The Best of Alternative & Rock (Star Music, 2010)
- Tribes (Every Nation Music, 2019)
- Yahweh (Every Nation Music, 2022)

=== Greatest Day ===
A collaboration between Harlene Delgado and Charlene Deslate in an old version. Anja Aguilar and Marika Sasaki to collaborate in a new version. The song was used for Unilever's Philippine TV Commercial of Sunsilk. The music video also featured both of them.

=== Rockoustic Mania ===
Barbie Almalbis and Pupil were chosen by Juicy Fruit as their advertising models to reach out to the younger generation in their Rockoustic Mania advertising events. The promotion included Juicy Fruit's Tugtog Mo! band competition, and Style mo! competition by Human and Pony footwear. The collaboration between the two artists offers a fusion of Rock and Acoustic. The AVCD features two songs, the music videos and some behind the scenes look at the artists' works. It was released on August 24, 2006.

The Juicy Fruit Rockoustic Mania Final Fusion event was held on November 17, at the Tanghalang Francisco Balagtas (Folk Arts Theater), Cultural Center of the Philippines. The show featured performances from Barbie Almalbis and Pupil, guest bands Sugarfree and Up Dharma Down, and of course, from the three finalists, WTC 11, Medea, and 7th Skool. The band 7th Skool won the Tugtog Mo! Band Competition.

Audio:
1. Nakakabaliw (E. Buendia, D. Ventura)
2. Must Have (E. Buendia, B. Almalbis, D. Sergio)

Video:
1. Nakakabaliw (Directed by RA Rivera)
2. Must Have (Directed by Pancho Esguerra)
3. MYX News

=== Tanaw Collective ===
Acel Bisa, Aia De Leon, Barbie Almalbis, Hannah Romawac, Kitchie Nadal, Lougee Basabas

=== Panatag ===
Hale ft. Barbie Almalbis 2024

=== Huling Sayaw | Tower Sessions ===
Kamikazee ft. Barbie Almalbis 2025

== Awards and nominations ==
Year	Award giving body	Category	Nominated work	Results
2006	Aliw Awards	Best Major Concert(Female)	"Barbie Rocks the Big Dome"	Nominated
2006	Awit Awards	Best Performance by a Female Recording Artist	"Just A Smile"	Won
2006	Meg Magazine Teens Choice Awards	Favorite Female Artist of the Year	—N/a	Won
2006	MTV Pilipinas Music Awards	Best Female Artist in a Video	"Dahilan"	Nominated
2006	MTV Pilipinas Music Awards	Best Animated Video	"Dahilan"	Nominated
2006	MYX Music Awards	Favorite Female Artist	—N/a	Nominated
2006	MYX Music Awards	Favorite Collaboration	"High" with The Speaks	Nominated
2006	MYX Music Awards	Favorite Media Soundtrack	"Just A Smile"	Nominated
2006	NU Rock Awards	Best Female Award	—N/a	Nominated
2007	MYX Music Awards	Favorite Media Soundtrack	"Nakakabaliw" with Pupil for Juicy Fruit Rockoustic Mania	Nominated
2018	Wish Music Awards	Wishclusive Rock/Alternative Performance of the Year	"Tabing Ilog"	Nominated

== Personal life ==
She is a daughter of Teresa Almalbis who is currently the vice-mayor of Roxas City, Capiz. She is married to Martin Honasan with two children, Noa Stina and Liam Israel.
