= 2018 in Philippine music =

The following is a list of notable events related to Philippine music in 2018.

== Events ==
=== May ===
- Sony Music Philippines resumed its operations after 6 years following the expiration of its distribution contract with Ivory Music, with their new office still in Ortigas Center, Pasig.

=== June ===
- June 2 – Janine Berdin from Lapu-Lapu, Cebu was hailed as the Grand Champion of the second year of Tawag ng Tanghalan on It's Showtime.

=== September ===
- Coke Studio Philippines announced its lineup of contemporary and indie Filipino acts for its 2nd season, namely: IV of Spades, Shanti Dope, December Avenue, Ben&Ben, KZ Tandingan, Moira Dela Torre, Sam Concepcion, Quest, Juan Miguel Severo, AJ Rafael, Khalil Ramos, Kriesha Chu, and DJ Patty Tiu.
- September 30 – Golden Cañedo of Cebu City was proclaimed as the champion of the first season of The Clash.

=== November ===
- November 11 — "Tugtog", composed by John Paul Salazar and interpreted by Bradz, was hailed as the winning entry in the 2018 A Song of Praise Music Festival Grand Finals Night held at the New Frontier Theater

== Debuts/Disbanded ==
=== Soloist ===
- John Roa
- Janine Berdin
- Zion Aquino
- Migz Haleco
- Karencitta
- Shanti Dope
- Mhot
- TALA
- RVRD
- Fern.
- Coeli
- Angelo Acosta
- Because
- Juan Miguel Severo
- Memphiis
- AC Bonifacio
- Janine Teñoso
- Unique
- Kyline Alcantara
- Isabella Vinzon
- Jeremy Glinoga
- Mark Oblea

=== Duoist/Bands/Groups ===
- Better Days
- Stellar
- Where's Ramona?
- Mandaue Nights
- One Click Straight
- Farewell Fair Weather
- Bawal Clan
- Music Hero Band
- MNL48
- Kakaiboys
- This Band
- AM/FM
- Over October
- Malana
- The Metro Fantastic
- July XIV
- SB19

=== Disbanded ===
- Jensen and The Flips

=== Reunion/Comeback ===
- Urbandub

=== On Hiatus ===
- Run Dorothy

== Albums released ==
The following albums are to be released in 2018 locally. Note: All soundtracks are not included in this list.

Date released	Title	Artist(s)	Label(s)	Source
January 8	Nagbabalik	Janno Gibbs	GMA Records	
January 13	Even Such Is Time	Cynthia Alexander	Independent	
January 19	Unit 406	Unit 406	Star Music	
January 26	Ating Panahon	727 Clique	Warner Music Philippines	
January 26	Realistick	Stick Figgas	MCA Music	
January 29	This	Migz Haleco	Star Music	
February 2	Flight	Franco	Independent	
February 4	Agsunta	AGSUNTA	Star Music	
February 8	Natsumi	Natsumi	Star Music	
February 8	Strings Attached	Moonstar88	Alpha Music	
February 16	Electro Sitti	Sitti Navarro	MCA Music	
February 19	Malaya	Moira Dela Torre	Star Music	
February 19	JC Santos	JC Santos	Star Music	
March 2	Walang Forever – EP	Erard	Star Music	
March 23	Synesthesia	Yeng Constantino	Star Music	
March 30	Fern.	Fern.	Universal Records	
April 1	Swerte	Angelo Acosta	Independent	
April 5	TALA	TALA	Universal Records	
April 13	This 15 Me	Sarah Geronimo	Viva Records	
April 15	Kyla (The Queen of R&B)	Kyla	Star Music	
April 28	K Brosas	K Brosas	Star Music	
May 4	Plug 'N Play	The Agadiers	Viva Records	
May 18	Claudia Barretto	Claudia Barretto	Universal Records	
May 25	Both of Us – EP	Bou	Curve Entertainment Inc.	
June 5	On The Bright Life	Moombahton Players	Fastplay Records	
June 12	Hearthbreak SZN	Because	Viva Records	
June 13	Alon	Hale	Warner Music Philippines	
June 15	Calypso	Juan Miguel Severo	PolyEast Records	
June 22	True Faith (Sentimental)	True Faith	Star Music	
June 29	Blank Pages	Farewell Fair Weather	Independent	
July 6	Stellar	Maris Racal	Star Music	
July 20	Angelina – EP	Angelina Cruz	Universal Records	
July 27	Breakthrough	Julie Anne San Jose	Universal Records	
July 27	Love, BoybandPH	BoybandPH	Star Music	
July 27	In My Room – EP	Jayda Avanzado	Star Music	
August 5	2ND Wave	Hashtags	Star Music	
August 5	Paid in Bawal	Bawal Clan	Independent	
August 6	Bela Padilla	Bela Padilla	Viva Records	
August 13	Grandma	UNIQUE	OC Records	
August 18	Hele Ng Maharlika	Rice Lucido	OC Records	
August 24	Familiarity	Runaway Crimes	Independent	
August 24	A J	AJ Ajrouche	Viva Records	
August 25	All My Friends	tide/edit	A Spur of the Moment Project	
August 31	Sequence	Lenses	Terno Recordings	
August 31	Like a Family	Kill the Boredom	Enterphil Entertainment Corporation	
September 9	Burnt Cookie	DZ SVG	Independent	
September 14	Virgo	Joslin	Viva Records	
September 19	Kyline	Kyline Alcantara	GMA Records	
September 21	Until I See You Again	Alden Richards	GMA Records	
September 25	Bugoy Decade	Bugoy Drilon	Star Music	
September 28	Kyle Juliano	Kyle Juliano	Universal Records	
September 28	Love You the Same	Janina Vela	Universal Records	
September 28	Nararamdaman – EP	Better Days	Universal Records	
September 28	Aitakatta – Gustong Makita	MNL48	Star Music	
October 3	Full Flood	Apartel	Offshore Music	
October 5	The Midnight Emotion	One Click Straight	Offshore Music	
October 11	Surprise	Donnalyn Bartolome	Viva Records	
October 13	D4 – EP	Daniel Padilla	Star Music	
October 13	Kyle Echarri	Kyle Echarri	Star Music	
October 19	Takipsilim	Autotelic	MCA Music	
October 19	Mandirigma ng Pag-Ibig	Banda ni Kleggy	Warner Music Philippines	
October 22	Loisa	Loisa Andalio	Star Music	
October 26	The Other Way Around – EP	Hilera	Warner Music Philippines	
October 26	Megastar	Sharon Cuneta	Star Music	
October 27	Serye	Marlo Mortel	Star Music	
November 2	Awit at Laro	Various Artists	Star Music	
November 23	@ Christmas Time	Various Artists	PolyEast Records	
November 25	Pag-Ibig Fortune Cookie	MNL48	Star Music	

== Concerts and music festivals ==
=== Local artists ===
Date(s)	Artist(s)	Venue	City	Event / Tour	Ref(s)
January 13	Cynthia Alexander; Ben&Ben	Music Museum	San Juan	Even Such Is Time Album Release	
January 13	December Avenue; Clara Benin	Mac Rock N' Roll and Blues Restobar	Cebu City	December Avenue x Clara Benin	
January 25	Nyoy Volante (Note: with special guests Kaye Cal, Sitti Navarro, Jay R, Yeng Constantino, Richard Poon, and Karla Estrada)	Music Museum	San Juan	Nyoy Volante Birthday Concert	
January 27	Julie Anne San Jose	Music Museum	San Juan	#Julie	
February 4	Maja Salvador (Note: with special guests Kakai Bautista, Vin Abrenica, Anna Fegi, and Joseph Marco)	IC3 Convention Center	Cebu City	Maja on Stage: Live in Cebu	
February 9	James Reid; Nadine Lustre	Smart Araneta Coliseum	Quezon City	Revolution: The JaDine Concert	
February 10	Martin Nievera; Ogie Alcasid; Regine Velasquez; Erik Santos	Mall of Asia Arena	Pasay	#paMORE	
February 13	Gabby Concepcion; Kuh Ledesma; Kris Lawrence; Isabelle	ABS-CBN Vertis Tent	Quezon City	Love Matters	
February 14	Joanna Ampil	BGC Arts Center	Taguig	Love Wins	
February 14	Lolita Carbon	Manila Hotel Grand Ballroom	Manila	Himig ng Pag-Ibig: A Lolita Carbon Valentine Special	
February 14	Ai-Ai delas Alas (Note: with special guest Piolo Pascual)	Palacio de Maynila	Manila	Ai Love U	
February 14	Jed Madela (Note: with special participation of Sarah Faye Bacal and WCOPA Team Philippines)	Kia Theatre	Quezon City	All About Love	
February 14	Rico Puno; Imelda Papin; Rey Valera; Claire de la Fuente (Note: with special participation of Rita Daniela and LA Santos)	Newport Performing Arts Theater, Resorts World Manila	Pasay	Timeless OPM	
February 14	Aiza Seguerra; The Company	Music Museum	San Juan	Aiza Seguerra & The Company's This Is Us. Hits: Originals & Covers	
February 14	Gary Valenciano (Note: featuring The Amp Band and with special guest Jona)	Shangri-La at the Fort Grand Ballroom	Taguig	Gary V: Love in Motion	
February 15	Basil Valdez (Note: with the Ateneo Chamber Singers)	Music Museum	San Juan	Love, Basil	
February 17	Bullet Dumas; Clara Benin; Ebe Dancel; Johnoy Danao; Reese Lansangan; Manila Philharmonic Orchestra	Bonifacio High Street Amphitheater	Taguig	Ensemble: A Valentine Concert	
February 17–18	Moira dela Torre	Kia Theatre	Quezon City	Tagpuan	
February 20	Morissette Amon	Smart Araneta Coliseum	Quezon City	Morissette is Made	
February 23	Maymay Entrata (Note: with special guest Edward Barber)	Kia Theatre	Quezon City	The Dream: Maymay in Concert	
February 24	Kisses Delavin (Note: with special guest Tony Labrusca)	Kia Theatre	Quezon City	Confidently, Kisses	
March 23	Maja Salvador	Kia Theatre	Quezon City	Maja on Stage: Live in Kia Theatre	
April 13	Sandwich	Metrotent, Metrowalk Ortigas	Pasig	Under the Glow of the Satellite: 20th Anniversary Concert	
April 14	Sarah Geronimo	Smart Araneta Coliseum	Quezon City	This 15 Me	
April 28	K Brosas	Kia Theatre	Quezon City	18K: The 18th Anniversary Concert	
May 18	Richard Poon	Newport Performing Arts Theater, Resorts World Manila	Pasay	RP10 : The 10th Anniversary Concert	
May 26	Darren Espanto	Kia Theatre	Quezon City	Unstoppable	
June 22	KZ Tandingan	SM Mall of Asia Arena (Note: KZ Tandingan's Supreme concert venue was originally going to be at the Smart Araneta Coliseum, but was later moved to SM Mall of Asia Arena for unknown reasons)	Pasay	Supreme	
July 13	Aegis	Smart Araneta Coliseum	Quezon City	20ble Dekada: Ang Soundtrack ng Buhay Mo	
July 28	The Dawn	Music Museum	San Juan City	Ascendants	
August 18	Anne Curtis	Smart Araneta Coliseum	Quezon City	Anne Kulit: Promise, Last na 'to! The 21st Anniversary Concert	
August 24	Ogie Alcasid	Smart Araneta Coliseum	Quezon City	Ogie Alcasid 30th Anniversary	
August 30	Jaya; Jay R Jason Dy	Newport Performing Arts Theater, Resorts World Manila (Note: SoulJa's concert venue was originally going to be at the Kia Theatre, but was later moved to Newport Performing Arts Theater, Resorts World Manila for unknown reasons)	Pasay	SoulJa	
September 1	James Reid; Nadine Lustre	Smart Araneta Coliseum	Quezon City	Revolution: The JaDine Concert The Repeat	
September 8	Kyline Alcantara	SM Skydome	Quezon City	Take Fl16ht: The Birthday Concert	
September 22	Erik Santos	Mall of Asia Arena	Pasay	Er1k 5antos: My Greatest Moments	
September 28	Sharon Cuneta	Smart Araneta Coliseum	Quezon City	Sharon: My 40 Years	
September 29	UNIQUE	Kia Theatre	Quezon City	The Grandma Tour	
October 19–20	Lea Salonga	PICC Plenary Hall	Pasay	Lea Salonga 40: The 40th Anniversary Concert	
October 25	True Faith	Music Museum	San Juan	Far From Perfect: 25th Anniversary Concert	
November 16	Jed Madela	Smart Araneta Coliseum	Quezon City	Jed Madela XV: Higher than High, The 15th Anniversary Concert	
November 17, 24 & 25	Regine Velasquez	New Frontier Theater	Quezon City	Regine at the Movies	
November 30	TNT Boys	Smart Araneta Coliseum	Quezon City	Listen! The Bigshot Trio Concert	
December 1	The Company	The Theatre at Solaire	Parañaque	Throwback	

=== International artists ===
Date(s)	Artist(s)	Venue	City	Event / Tour	Ref(s)
January 6	SF9	The Theatre at Solaire	Parañaque	Be My Fantasy	
January 13	Planetshakers	Smart Araneta Coliseum	Quezon City	Planetshakers Conference Manila/Quezon City	
January 14	JBJ	Smart Araneta Coliseum	Quezon City	Come True	
January 21	Nothing But Thieves	Kia Theatre	Quezon City	Broken Machine World Tour	
January 26	Foster the People	Kia Theatre	Quezon City	The Sacred Hearts Club Tour	
January 29	One Ok Rock	Mall of Asia Arena	Pasay	Ambitions Asia Tour	
February 7	The xx	World Trade Center	Pasay	I See You Tour	
February 9	Kard	Kia Theatre	Quezon City	Wild Kard: Tour in Asia	
February 9	Sungha Jung	J Centre Convention Hall	Mandaue	[Mixtape] Tour	
February 10	Sungha Jung	Newport Performing Arts Theater, Resorts World Manila	Pasay	[Mixtape] Tour	
February 10	Ji Soo	SM City North EDSA – Skydome	Quezon City	My One and Only	
February 16	Oh Wonder	Greenbelt	Makati	Oh Wonder Live at Ayala Malls	
February 17	Oh Wonder	U.P. Town Center	Quezon City	Oh Wonder Live at Ayala Malls	
February 17	Incubus	Smart Araneta Coliseum	Quezon City	8 Tour	
February 18	Oh Wonder	Alabang Town Center	Muntinlupa	Oh Wonder Live at Ayala Malls	
February 23	Alex Aiono (Note: with special guest Darren Espanto)	Uptown Mall	Taguig	Manila Tour 2018	
February 24	Alex Aiono	Eastwood City	Quezon City	Manila Tour 2018	
February 25	Alex Aiono	Venice Piazza Grand Canal Mall	Taguig	Manila Tour 2018	
February 26	Collabro	Newport Performing Arts Theater, Resorts World Manila	Pasay	Collabro Live in Manila	
March 6	Fifth Harmony	Kia Theatre	Quezon City	PSA Tour	
March 18	Neck Deep	SM City North EDSA – Skydome	Quezon City	The Peace and the Panic Tour	
March 21	John Legend	Smart Araneta Coliseum	Quezon City	Darkness and Light Tour	
April 2	Katy Perry	Mall of Asia Arena	Pasay	Witness: The Tour	
April 5–6	LANY	Smart Araneta Coliseum	Quezon City	LANY Live in Manila	
April 8 (Note: Ed Sheeran's ÷ Tour concert at the Mall of Asia Concert Grounds in Pasay on April 8 was originally scheduled for November 7, 2017, but was postponed due to Sheeran's injury from a bike accident.)	Ed Sheeran	Mall of Asia Concert Grounds	Pasay	÷ Tour	
April 13	Zedd	Cove Manila, Okada Manila (Note: Zedd's Echo Tour concert venue was at the Smart Araneta Coliseum, but was later moved to Cove Manila due to unforeseen circumstances.)	Parañaque	Echo Tour	
April 14	The Script	Mall of Asia Arena	Pasay	Freedom Child Tour	
May 1	Harry Styles (Note: with opening act Warpaint)	Mall of Asia Arena	Pasay	Harry Styles: Live on Tour	
May 3–4	Bruno Mars	Mall of Asia Arena	Pasay	24K Magic World Tour	
May 10	Ja Rule	Cove Manila, Okada Manila	Parañaque	Ja Rule Live in Manila	
May 11	Diplo	Cove Manila, Okada Manila	Parañaque	Diplo Live in Manila	
May 18	HRVY	Eastwood City	Quezon City	HRVY Live in Manila	
May 19	HRVY	Uptown Mall	Taguig	HRVY Live in Manila	
May 25	Kehlani	The Island at the Palace, Uptown Bonifacio	Taguig	Kehlani Live in Manila	
June 1	Boyce Avenue; Moira Dela Torre	Smart Araneta Coliseum	Quezon City	Boyce Avenue with Moira	
June 7	Andy Grammer	Music Museum	San Juan	Andy Grammer Live in Manila	
June 10	Niall Horan	Mall of Asia Arena	Pasay	Flicker World Tour	
June 15	Hillsong United; Hillsong Young & Free	Smart Araneta Coliseum	Quezon City	Hillsong: United × Young & Free 2018 Tour	
June 24	Scandal	SMX Convention Center	Pasay	Honey Asia Tour	
July 19–20	Celine Dion (Note: with opening act Véronic DiCaire)	Mall of Asia Arena	Pasay	Celine Dion Live 2018	
August 10	Halsey (Note: with special guest Niki)	Kia Theatre (Note: Halsey's Hopeless Fountain Kingdom World Tour concert venue was originally going to be at the Smart Araneta Coliseum, but was later moved to Kia Theatre due to unforeseen circumstances)	Quezon City	Hopeless Fountain Kingdom World Tour	
August 14	Walk the Moon	Market! Market!	Taguig	Live in Manila	
August 23 (Note: Paramore's Tour Four concert at the Mall of Asia Arena in Pasay on August 23 was originally scheduled for February 18, but was postponed due to the aggravation of lead vocalist Hayley Williams's throat and upper respiratory tract infection.)	Paramore	Mall of Asia Arena	Pasay	Tour Four	
August 24	Sabrina Carpenter	Uptown Mall	Taguig	Manila Tour 2018	
August 25	Sabrina Carpenter	Eastwood City	Quezon City	Manila Tour 2018	
August 26	Sabrina Carpenter	Venice Piazza Grand Canal Mall	Taguig	Manila Tour 2018	
August 26	Why Don't We	Samsung Hall, SM Aura Premier	Taguig	The Invitation Tour	
September 5	The Bootleg Beatles	PICC, Plenary Hall	Pasay	The Bootleg Beatles in Concert Live in Manila	
September 6	Kevyn Lettau	Newport Performing Arts Theater	Pasay	Kevyn Lettau: Shower the People You Love with Love	
September 7	Tiny Moving Parts	Skydome, SM City North EDSA	Quezon City	Tiny Moving Parts Live in Manila	
September 8	The Bootleg Beatles	IC3 Convention Center	Cebu City	The Bootleg Beatles in Concert Live in Manila	
September 14	Dua Lipa	Mall of Asia Arena	Pasay	Self-Titled Tour	
September 14	CNCO	SM City Cebu	Cebu City	CNCO Live!	
September 15	Tiffany and Debbie Gibson	Mall of Asia Arena	Pasay	Back to Back Concert	
September 15	CNCO	SM City Fairview	Quezon City	CNCO Live!	
September 16	CNCO	The Block – SM City North EDSA	Quezon City	CNCO Live!	
September 29	Seventeen	Mall of Asia Arena	Pasay	Ideal Cut Tour	
October 5	Sam Smith	Mall of Asia Arena	Pasay	The Thrill of It All Tour	
October 20	Panic! at the Disco	Mall of Asia Arena	Pasay	Pray for the Wicked Tour	
October 25	Kygo	Mall of Asia Arena	Pasay	Kids in Love Tour	
October 26	Mariah Carey	Smart Araneta Coliseum	Quezon City	Mariah Carey Live in Concert	
October 30	Calum Scott	New Frontier Theater	Quezon City	Only Human Asia Tour	
November 5	Khalid	Smart Araneta Coliseum	Quezon City	American Teen Tour	
November 10	Winner	Mall of Asia Arena	Quezon City	Everywhere Tour	
November 11	Guns N' Roses	Philippine Arena	Bocaue	Not in This Lifetime... Tour	
November 11	IKON	Mall of Asia Arena	Pasay	Continue Tour	
November 18	Aaron Carter	New Frontier Theater	Quezon City	Live in Manila	
November 25	Against the Current	Skydome, SM City North EDSA	Quezon City	The Past Lives Tour	
November 30	The Moffats	New Frontier Theater	Quezon City	Reunion Tour	
December 4	Michael Learns to Rock	Davao City		Still Asian Tour	
December 6	Michael Learns to Rock	Laguna		Still Asian Tour	
December 6	Per Sørensen	Newport Performing Arts Theater, Resorts World Manila	Pasay	The Voice of Fra Lippo Lippi	
December 7	Michael Learns to Rock	Cebu City		Still Asian Tour	
December 9	Michael Learns to Rock	Smart Araneta Coliseum	Quezon City	Still Asian Tour	
December 14	Taeyeon	New Frontier Theater	Quezon City	's... Tour	
December 15	Boyz II Men; Kyla; KZ Tandingan; Yeng Constantino; Angeline Quinto	Smart Araneta Coliseum	Quezon City	Boyz II Men with DIVAS	

=== Music festivals ===
Date(s)	Artist(s)	Venue	City	Festival	Ref(s)
February 10	Blue; Vertical Horizon; Stephen Speaks; Leigh Nash; Rivermaya; Moonstar88; MYMP	Circuit Makati	Makati	Playback Music Festival	
February 24–25	120 various artists	Aseana City Open Grounds	Parañaque	Rakrakan Festival 2018: Pinoy Muna!	
March 10	Kodaline; French Kiwi Juice; Lauv; Daniel Caesar; Jhene Aiko; Bag Raiders; IV of Spades; Basically Saturday Night; Carousel Casualties; Quest; Ben&Ben; Jess Connelly; Asch	Filinvest City Event Grounds	Muntinlupa	Wanderland Music and Arts Festival	
March 23–25	Hiatus Kaiyote; Laneous & The Family Yah; Ruby Ibarra; Stick Figgas; Skarm; Crwn; Yung Bawal	Malasimbo Amphitheater	Puerto Galera	Malasimbo Music and Arts Festival	
April 7	Mashd N Kutcher; Rave Radio; Teddy Cream; Skytek; Tom Taus; Ace Ramos; Patty Tiu; Marc Marasigan; Jet Boado; Funk Avy; Kat DJ; Katsy Lee; Cathy Frey; MC Pao; MC Boo	Globe Circuit Event Grounds, Circuit Makati	Makati	Chroma Music Festival 3.0	
April 14	17 various artists	B-Side, The Collective	Makati	Red Ninja Year 9 Fest	
May 5	Behemoth; At the Gates; Cradle of Filth; Death Angel; Crown the Empire; Jinjer; Attila; Crystal Lake; Nervecell; Secrets	Amoranto Sports Complex	Quezon City	Pulp Summer Slam	
May 5	Permanence; Mandaue Nights; Clara Benin; tide/edit; Pedicab; Oh, Flamingo!; Ruru; IV of Spades; UPRISING; The Sleeves; Tiger Pussy; Munimuni; She's Only Sixteen; X0809; Tom's Story; The Ransom Collective; BP Valenzuela; Dicta License	Century City Mall	Makati	Summer Noise: A The Rest Is Noise Show	
May 19	Various artists	Museo Orlina	Tagaytay	Tagaytay Art Beat 3	
June 2	Pepe Smith & other 60 Pinoy Rock Bands	Amoranto Sports Complex	Quezon City	Pepe Smith Rockfest 2018	
June 23	Various artists	Various venues	Makati	Fete de la Musique Philippines	
June 29	Various artists	Intramuros	Manila	Fete de la Musique Philippines	
June 30	Various artists	—N/a	Baguio	Fete de la Musique Philippines	
June 30	Various artists	—N/a	Laguna	Fete de la Musique Philippines	
October 27	Various artists	Globe Circuit Event Grounds	Makati	Jack TV MADFest	
November 24–25	Various artists	Century City Mall	Makati	All of the Noise: A The Rest Is Noise Year-End Show	
November 24	Various artists and DJs	SM Mall of Asia Concert Grounds	Pasay	Futureland Music Festival	
December 8	Various artists	Riverside Studios	Makati	Red Ninja Year-End Fest	

=== Canceled/postponed dates ===
Date(s)	Artist(s)	Venue	City	Event / Tour	Reason cited	Ref(s)
January 12	Nelly	Cove Manila, Okada Manila	Parañaque	Nelly Live in Manila	Unforeseen circumstances (to be postponed to a later date)	
November 6	Charlie Puth	Mall of Asia Arena	Pasay	Voicenotes Tour	Unforeseen circumstances	
December 7	The Weeknd	Mall of Asia Arena	Pasay	Asia Tour	Production requirement issues	
December 7	Various local artists	Mall of Asia Concert Grounds	Pasay	Coke Studio Season 2: Homecoming Concert	Safety concerns due to overcrowding. (postponed to April 2019)	

== Awarding ceremonies ==
- January 15 – 3rd Wish 107.5 Music Awards, organized by Wish 1075
- May 15 – Myx Music Awards 2018, organized by myx
- July 21 – MOR Pinoy Music Awards 2018, organized by MOR 101.9
- August 19 – 10th PMPC Star Awards for Music, organized by Philippine Movie Press Club
- October 15 – 31st Awit Awards, organized by the Philippine Association of the Record Industry

== Deaths ==
- March 27 – Bert Nievera (b. 1936), singer
- September 2 – Rene Garcia, (b. 1952), former member of Hotdog
- October 30 – Rico J. Puno (b. 1953), Filipino singer, comedian, actor and television host
