= Imperial Manila =

Filipino political pejorative epithet

"Imperial Manila" (Filipino: Maynilang Imperyal, Cebuano: Imperyal nga Manila) is a pejorative epithet used by sectors of Filipino society, particularly outside Metro Manila, to express the idea that all the affairs of the Philippines—whether in politics, economy and business or culture—are decided by what goes on in the capital region of Metro Manila, without considering the needs of the rest of the country, largely because of centralized government and urbanite snobbery. Empirical research finds that the "Imperial Manila" concept and its persistence over time has led to prolonged underdevelopment in Philippine provinces.

This sentiment is sometimes expressed by the proverb "Not a leaf can fall in our country without Malacañang's permission." (Note: An example of this proverb's use can be found the following quote from David C. Martínez: [W]e've left sacred and untouched, spotless and unsullied, the same centralist authority where near-absolute political power continues to reside: Imperial Manila. My father spoke the truth when he used to lament in Cebuano, "[Way] dahong mahulog sa atong nasud nga di mananghid sa Malacañang" (Not a leaf can fall in our country without Malacañang's permission)) Another expression of Manila's powerful influence was voiced by National Artist of the Philippines Nick Joaquin, who said, "When Manila sneezes, the Philippines catches cold."

== History ==
The oldest known use of the phrase "Imperial Manila" dates back to 1927, when an article in The American Chamber of Commerce Journal used the phrase to describe two cases heard by the Supreme Court, Gabriel v. Provincial Board of Pampanga and Luta v. Municipality of Zamboanga, concerning local government autonomy.

Contemporary use of the term dates to around the time of the People Power Revolution, when political writers, particularly those living outside Metro Manila, began using the term in the belief that the country's former president, Ferdinand Marcos, was toppled from his position without the participation of Filipinos living in areas outside of the capital region. In the 1970s, Marcos borrowed US$2.5 billion from the World Bank in order to establish Manila as a globally-competitive city. The funding facilitated government-backed expenditures on infrastructure and urban developments that displaced and relocated the urban poor while benefitting elites, who were able to profit.

In an article published in The Manila Times the day after the People Power Revolution, columnist Amando Doronila wrote that:

The people power movement has been an Imperial Manila phenomenon. Their (Note: Doronila here refers to the elites of the Philippine political class.) playing field is EDSA. They have excluded the provincianos from their movement with their insufferable arrogance and snobbery, ignoring the existence of the toiling masses and peasantry in agrarian Philippines.

== Uses ==
=== Politics ===
The term was used by Philippine President Gloria Macapagal Arroyo in her 2006 State of the Nation Address, which she said has "slowed down progress, has become open to over-competition and oppressed the provinces and its people". It was because of the country's centralized government that provincial governments favor constitutional amendments for a shift to federal government, as well as supporting Arroyo and rejecting calls from Manila-based activist groups demanding for her resignation due to corruption charges particularly the Philippine National Broadband Network controversy.

Local opinion polls have also been lambasted for solely sampling "Imperial Manila-based residents" when it comes to surveys that deal with nationwide issues. Meanwhile, the term also appears in government websites such as those of the League of Provinces and the Province of Bohol.

Sara Duterte-Carpio, Mayor of Davao City, daughter of President Rodrigo Duterte and future Vice President of the Philippines, questions the use of 1976 song Manila by Hotdog during the parade of Team Philippines at the 2019 Southeast Asian Games opening ceremony. She claims the title is capital-centric and does not represent the whole country, even suggesting to use budots instead since her fellow Davaoeños "invented" it.

=== Economy ===
Officials of the Mindanao-based group Moro Islamic Liberation Front have blamed "Imperial Manila" for making the Muslim Mindanao region the poorest in the country, stating that "the consequence of neocolonialism has deprived our people to run themselves unfettered and unhampered." Government figures show that the region's poverty incidence in 2006 is at 55.3%, with three of its six provinces (namely Tawi-Tawi, Maguindanao and Lanao del Sur) listed among the country's ten poorest provinces.

"Imperial Manila" is also used by many in the business sector in reference to the notion that advertising or marketing a product only requires a single campaign that would work in Mega Manila (another Manila-centric term used most frequently by the media), thinking that it would also attract customers in the provinces. Advertising agencies in Metro Manila are also faulted for publishing print advertisements in Manila-based newspapers that would reach other cities by mid-morning (when the residents have already read their own local daily) or running a television commercial at a primetime slot of 21:00 in Manila while the rest of the country is already asleep.

In 2009, economists from the University of the Philippines and the World Bank made statements encouraging the Philippine government to further concentrate national economic activity within Metro Manila rather than disperse it around the country. Meanwhile, in some parts of Luzon, in some scattered areas in the Visayas and in Mindanao, rolling blackouts happen almost daily. Metro Manila commuters, too, many of whom have had to leave their families in other parts of the country in order to look for work, suffer from the effects of traffic congestion.

=== Culture ===
The term is also used, particularly in Cebu, in conjunction with the perceived imposition of the Tagalog language, which is the language not just of Manila but also of many of the country's other provinces, as a national language. The provincial government of Cebu has even mandated that the national anthem be sung in Cebuano as a form of linguistic protest, in spite of a law that punishes the singing of the national anthem in languages other than Tagalog with fine or imprisonment.

The legal imposition of Tagalog as a national symbol also has social implications, such as pressure to use the words po and opo (a contraction of oo po, honorifics used for elders and persons of authority), honorifics which have no equivalent in most other indigenous languages in the country. Attempts have also been made to bring the orthographic conventions of other languages closer to those of Tagalog.

Notably, Tagalog-speakers themselves who are not from the capital region (e.g. Calabarzon or Mimaropa) are often derided as unsophisticated promdi (Tagalized form of "from the"; hicks or country bumpkins) because of their accent, grammar, vocabulary or rural customs.

== See also ==
- Balik Probinsya, a program by the Philippine government to reverse the migration of people to Metro Manila and other urban areas
