= Method Adaptor =

2024 studio album by Ely Buendia

Studio album by Ely Buendia
- Released: November 8, 2024
- Recorded: 2024
- Studios: Crow's Nest, Abbey Road, London
- Genre: Alternative rock
- Length: 43:24
- Labels: Sony Music Philippines; Offshore Music
- Producers: Jerome Velasco; Audry Dionisio

Ely Buendia chronology
In Love & War (2010)	Method Adaptor (2024)	Method Adaptor Remixed (2025)

Singles from Method Adaptor
- 1. "Bulaklak Sa Buwan" Released: August 16, 2024; 2. "Tagpi-Tagping Piraso" Released: October 17, 2024; 3. "Kandarapa" Released: November 8, 2024

Method Adaptor is the second solo studio album by Filipino musician Ely Buendia, first released on November 8, 2024, by Sony Music Philippines and Offshore Music. It is his first solo album since Wanted Bedspacer (2000).

== Background ==
Buendia released his first solo album, Wanted Bedspacer, in December 2000. After leaving Eraserheads, he formed the bands The Mongols, Pupil, The Oktaves, and Apartel. Buendia has also collaborated with the rapper Francis M. on the collaborative album In Love & War (2010) as well as the bands Itchyworms and Cheats. In 2016, he formed the independent record label Offshore Music.

Buendia reflected on his solo career. "I did have kind of an identity crisis as an artist and musician because after the breakup of the [Eraserheads], there was just a lot of noise, with regards to what an Ely Buendia song should be and how it should sound like," he said. To cope, the musician "adapted a methodology" in his creative process by working in specific genres, such as modern rock for Pupil, rockabilly for The Oktaves, and R&B for Apartel. This process later inspired the album title.

About writing songs for Method Adaptor, Buendia said in an interview with Daily Tribune: “It had been a while since I started writing new songs again. I experienced some sort of a mild writer’s block, and I decided to figure out how to be creative again." He also did not consider Wanted: Bedspacer to be an official release since "parang laro-laro lang ‘yun, nag-experiment lang ako sa kuwarto ko (because I was just playing around then, I just experimented a bit in the my room) and I decided to release it," he continued.

== Recording ==
Buendia wrote the songs for Method Adaptor in a month, with the melody for lead single "Bulaklak Sa Buwan" taking him five years to write. He recorded the tracks "Kandarapa" and "Deadbeat Creeper" at Abbey Road Studios in London while accompanying Ena Mori on her UK tour in early 2024. The album was produced by Buendia's longtime collaborator Jerome Velasco and Audry Dionisio, with additional contributions from Erwin Romulo.

In an interview with Philippine Daily Inquirer, Buendia stated that the album "represents what I really am as a songwriter — at least for this time period", with callbacks to his previous works. In a press release, Buendia added: “I think all the songs have something to do with rebelling—be it from the disappointments and hardships of life or from the control that people want to have on your mind. I would say these are the most defiant songs I’ve written so far."

== Singles ==
The album's first single "Bulaklak Sa Buwan" was released on August 16, 2024, with an accompanying music video. Produced by longtime collaborator Jerome Velasco, the song is about misinformation and propaganda. "I've been watching documentaries a lot, and I tried to distill everything in one song," Buendia explained.

The second single "Tagpi-Tagping Piraso" was released on October 17, 2024, with an accompanying lyric video. The song's sound is described as being "heavily reminiscent of fast-paced rock", with the lyrics tackling retrospection and "the beauty of letting things be". Its official music video was released a week later and features Buendia performing in a dystopian setting created through CGI from Glitch Real-time Animation.

"Kandarapa" was announced as the third single with the release of the album. Buendia describes the track as a reflection of pushing forward: “Sometimes you feel like you’re going to have to battle your way through the rest of your life."

== Release ==
Buendia launched the album with a live show at 123 Block in Mandaluyong City on its release date, with performances from Offshore Music artists ALYSON, Aviators, Carousel Casualties, Ligaya Escueta, and Pinkmen. A limited number of signed CD copies were made available to those who purchased tickets.

In January 2025, Buendia announced the physical release of Method Adaptor on limited edition vinyl, cassette, and newly issued CD.

A remix album featuring DJ Love and Raimund Marasigan's electronic project Squid 9 was released in April 2025.

== Reception ==
Rappler reviewed the album: "Buendia is still a man who knows his way around a tune and can navigate hackneyed phrases, such that — when he’s through with them — they’ll ring both true and new." Billboard Philippines praised the album as "a sonically adventurous record that represents an artist at his creative prime".

Method Adaptor won Album of the Year at the New Hue Video Music Awards in July 2025.

== Track listing ==
All tracks are written by Ely Buendia.

No.	Title	Length
1.	"Faithful Song"	3:03
2.	"Kandarapa"	4:15
3.	"Bulaklak Sa Buwan"	4:56
4.	"Tamang Hinala"	4:41
5.	"Deadbeat Creeper"	3:32
6.	"Sige"	3:46
7.	"Tagpi-Tagping Piraso"	4:46
8.	"Kontrabando"	4:21
9.	"Chance Passenger"	5:58
10.	"Esprit De Corpse"	4:04
Total length:		43:24

== Personnel ==
- Ely Buendia - vocals, guitars, bass, keys, synth
- Pat Sarabia - drums
- Ryan Goan - keyboards, synth
- Jerome Velasco - guitars, bass (track 2)
- Ena Mori - piano, synth (track 5)
- Audry Dionisio - backup vocals (track 8)
- Eon Buendia - backup vocals (track 9)
- Abot Tala Music Production Students - backup choir (track 3)

=== Production ===
- Ely Buendia - executive producer, mixing, mastering
- Pat Sarabia - executive producer
- Derick Villarino - executive producer
- Audry Dionisio - producer, recording engineer, vinyl and album supervisor
- Jerome Velasco - producer, mixing
- Erwin Romulo - additional production

=== Design ===
- Serious Studio - creative direction, vinyl layout
- JL Javier - album cover, photography
