= Method Adaptor Remixed =

2025 remix album by Ely Buendia

Remix album by Ely Buendia
- Released: April 30, 2025
- Genre: Electronic music
- Length: 42:20
- Label: Offshore Music; Sony Music Philippines
- Producer: Various

Ely Buendia chronology
Method Adaptor (2024)	Method Adaptor Remixed (2025)

Method Adaptor Remixed is a remix album of songs from Method Adaptor, the second solo studio album by Filipino musician Ely Buendia. It was released on April 30, 2025 by Offshore Music.

== Content ==
The original album’s lead single “Bulaklak Sa Buwan” was remixed by DJ Love, who popularized the budots genre. It is described as "exhilarating and fresh" and "transforms the original piece into a distinctly Filipino EDM experience". “Tagpi-Tagping Piraso” was remixed by Squid 9, the electronic project of Buendia’s Eraserheads bandmate Raimund Marasigan.

== Track listing ==
1. "Faithful Song" (atmorae-SynthNoYume Remix) - 3:32
2. "Kandarapa" (lipsum Remix) - 3:44
3. "Bulaklak Sa Buwan" (DJ Love Remix) - 4:31
4. "Tamang Hinala" (D Waviee Remix) - 6:25
5. "Deadbeat Creeper" (LOVOL Remix) - 2:53
6. "Sige" (Diego Mapa Remix) - 4:57
7. "Tagpi-Tagping Piraso" (Squid 9 Remix) - 5:10
8. "Kontrabando" (Mandaue Nights Remix) - 3:43
9. "Chance Passenger" (dani Remix) - 3:43
10. "Esprit de Corpse" (PYR0CL4ST Remix) - 3:42
