= Budots =

Philippine music genre

- Native name: Budots
- Etymology: "Slacker", in Bisaya slang
- Stylistic origins: House; techno; eurodance; Dutch house; Italo dance; Melbourne bounce; early hardstyle; Visayan pop
- Cultural origins: 2008, Davao City, Philippines
- Derivative forms: Full bass; battlemix

Budots (/buːˈdɒts/; boo-DOTS) is an electronic dance music (EDM) genre that originated in Davao City, Philippines, and is considered as street style techno. It eventually spread in Bisaya-speaking regions. Based on techno and house music with Visayan pop, it is regarded as the first "Filipino-fied" electronic music genre, characterized by its aggressive percussion, heavy use of sampling, off-beat basslines, high-pitched "tiw ti-ti-tiw" whistle hooks, and organic noises that surround the city. It is created to complement a form of freestyle street dance that bears the same name.

== Etymology ==
Budots is a Bisaya slang word for slacker (Tagalog: tambay). An undergraduate thesis published in University of the Philippines Mindanao suggests the slang originated from the Bisaya word burot meaning "to inflate", a euphemism for the glue-sniffing juvenile delinquents called "rugby boys". The publication also claims that rugby boys dance in a style that would be called budots to disguise their drug use. It can also be traced from the Bisaya word tabudots, which means "a person dancing with unpredictable movements."

== Origins ==
A demonstration of Davao-style Budots dance, as seen on one of DJ Love's music videos.

A budots dancer places his fist on his nose, similar to how "rugby boys" sniff glue through plastic bags.

The style seems "worm-like" or "ragdoll-like" in nature, wriggling the hips while moving the arms and legs in slow movements. One of its characteristic moves features opening and closing the knees while in a low squat, the arms swaying and pointing at random. Despite its freestyle movements.

Budots dance was performed with foreign electronic dance music until Sherwin Calumpang Tuna, an internet café manager who goes by the stage name DJ Love or Lablab, created a new techno music genre that would complement the dance using FL Studio, which locals referred to as "bistik" (short for Bisayang Tikno, "Visayan techno"). He also choreographed dance steps for his friends to perform on his budots music videos, which were uploaded on his YouTube channel since February 3, 2009. According to Vice, the budots dance compilation videos features "Myspace-era graphics, free-wheeling dances, and the names 'CamusBoyz' or 'DJ Love.'" In an article published on February 18, 2025, The Philippine Daily Inquirer writer Gabriel Pabico Lalu identified budots as a "Visayan pop dance craze".

While local impression about budots is through its association with overt sexuality, gang wars, and juvenile delinquency, DJ Love has distanced himself and his budots mixes from such issues that plague Davao City. His music videos are incorporated with captions such as, "Yes to Dance; No to Drugs" or "Yes to Dance; No to Riots." The genre–and its creators–have also become at the receiving end of cyberbullying.

== Characteristics ==
Asukarap Choy / Sayaw Mga Choy by DJ Arjay contains three breaks of uneven lengths, a single climax, and two lengthy vocal samples. The track was never officially released, as the creator screen-recorded his unrendered project on YouTube. Note the two notification sounds at the 46-second mark.

Budots music is characterized as a derivation from electronic and house music. It features 140 bpm four-on-the-floor patterns, notably having a kick-snare-kick-snare pattern, off-beat basslines, drum loops, a distinctive snare sound, distorted vocal samples, vocal chops, DJ fills placed throughout the track and distinct high-pitched dutch house inspired synth hooks that locals onomatopoetically refer to as tiw tiw. The melodies and patterns are similar of that from early forms of hardstyle and tribal rhythms. Its basslines are influenced from Eurodance. There are also expressions of emotional vulnerability in exchange for lewd jokes and calls for rowdy partying. Most budots tracks follow the structure of techno and early hardstyle. The energetic beats are usually accompanied with sound effects such as vinyl scratches or chipmunk laughter. Meanwhile, budots tracks with lyrics are written in any of the Bisayan languages, those that lack any lyrical content take advantage of sampling vocal speeches from any source. Budots producers also put their producer tags that typically goes "(DJ name) on the mix" or "(DJ name) on the beat".

Budots is known for its high-pitched whistle hooks, as heard in this sample from Gahi by DJ Eclipse.

Unlike most dance music that is commonly played in nightclubs, budots is performed on public places such as basketball courts. It also has an element of virality, as its distinct repetitive sound and the craziness of its dance moves serve as the background of a number of Filipino internet memes such as Hala Mahulog! ("Oh no, it's about to fall!") videos and Taga-asa Ka/ Tagasaan Ka ("Where are you from?") challenge.

In 2024, "Emergency Budots" by DJ Johnrey received international attention through a dance trend in TikTok and other short form content exposing budots to international audiences for the first time.

Music journalists in the Philippines have criticized budots music for its lack of form, repetitiveness, DIY quality, and "cheap-sounding" effects. In contrast, they also acknowledge how the people of Davao City have reinterpreted a Western music genre and have remolded it to their own liking, as well as the flexibility of budots music in keeping itself relevant by remixing any popular song at the moment.

Budots is comparable to other electronic dance music genres that have developed in neighboring Southeast Asian countries such as full bass in Indonesia and Vinahouse in Vietnam.

== Depictions in popular culture ==
Budots first appeared in Philippine mainstream media in 2008 when Ruben Gonzaga, the winner of Pinoy Big Brother: Celebrity Edition 2, performed the dance steps on national TV. An episode of GMA Network's news magazine program Kapuso Mo, Jessica Soho featured a segment about budots in 2012. In an effort to explain a regional subculture to a Metro Manila-based TV audience, host Jessica Soho called the budots dance as the Philippines' counterpart to other dance crazes at the time such as the dougie in the United States and the "horse dance" in Gangnam Style by Psy of South Korea, describing it as "seemingly freestyle like the pandanggo." She also said that in some instances, the performers did the "spageti dance" that was popularized by SexBomb Girls, but they spent much of the time grinding while in a squatting position that it was deemed vulgar by people who were unfamiliar with the genre.

BuwanBuwan, a Filipino electronic music collective, released a playlist of budots music in 2017 as part of their monthly challenge to their producers. Each track featured excerpts from speeches of Philippine president Rodrigo Duterte, a resident of Davao City. London-based collective and label Eastern Margins released a compilation album titled "Redline Legends," which features reinterpretations of East and Southeast Asian dance music genres such as budots, Vietnam's vinahouse, and Indonesia's funkot.

D'Squared Cru, a street dance group from Davao City, won second place in VIBE PH Dance Competition in 2018 after performing a routine that featured budots tracks namely Budotz by Q-York, Asukarap, and Kiat Jud Dai. Their choreography to the Kiat Jud Dai segment became viral in China after multiple content creators on TikTok and other social media replicated the dance steps, which they referred to as the "electric pendulum dance" (电摆舞, diàn bǎi wǔ). Chinese celebrity Wang Yibo danced to Kiat Jud Dai in an episode of Upward Everyday variety show on Hunan Television.

D'Squared Cru participated in the first season of World of Dance Philippines in 2019, also performing to budots, but failed to pass the Qualifiers. The group then flew to China that same year to participate in Shenzhen Satellite TV's Dance in Step. Their Round 1 performance featured their viral budots choreography, which impressed all three judges.

The documentary Budots: The Craze by Jay Rosas and Mark Paul Limbaga explored the music genre and its dance style, featuring an interview with DJ Love. According to Sun Star of Davao City, the film "raises questions on creative gatekeeping and the extent of ownership", as DJ Love's music was played on Filipino TV networks without proper acknowledgment and compensation. He also alleged a YouTuber claimed ownership of his popular mixes. The documentary premiered in 2019 at the Cinemalaya Philippine Independent Film Festival and was nominated for Best Documentary at the 43rd Gawad Urian Award.

A restaurant in Cagayan de Oro had its waitstaff dance to budots once the disco lights were turned on. An advertisement for Lucky Me! Pancit Canton in 2019 used budots as a mnemonic device for its "No Drain Cooking" method.

In February 2023, Manila Community Radio won Boiler Room's sixth Broadcast Lab grant to mount a showcase spotlighting budots and its many mutations. The Broadcast Lab grant scheme funds ideas in the broadcasting space, and brings new audiences to underrepresented scenes, communities, and artists. The recording session took place in April 2023 at an undisclosed location, featuring DJ Love, Libya Montes, Teya Logos, Showtime Official Club, T33G33, Hideki Ito, obese.dogma777, and Pikunin.

Budots remixes of popular songs have become mainstays in Philippine festivals, local radio stations, and Christmas parties. It has also become a form of "uncool" yet non-derogatory self-expression.

The 2022 Irish-Filipino horror film Nocebo also features Budots as part of its soundtrack.

In June 2024, the budots song "Emergency, paging Dr Beat" by DJ Johnrey (sampled from Miami Sound Machine's "Dr. Beat") went viral on TikTok accompanying short videos of people changing into a series of outfits. It caused a surge in popularity of other similar remixes like "Emergency Budots" by Linear Phase (also budots). Unlike the exaggerated and smoother comedic dance moves in budots (which are featured in earlier videos with the song on TikTok), the later TikTok trend feature subtler and stiffer movements while walking in place, due to it achieving popularity from TikTok videos of a Roblox emote.

The 2025 Filipino song "Baduy" by the P-pop girl group VVINK mixed bubblegum pop song with a spin of budots of DJ Love and Pio Balbuena.

== Usage in Philippine politics ==
A caption in DJ Love's Bloom Techmo Bomb Mix music video reads, "Under Martial Law With Love," which can be read as support for President Rodrigo Duterte's Proclamation No. 216.

During his term as mayor of Davao City, Duterte was seen dancing to budots on two occasions in 2015. One video featured Duterte dancing with Cebuano-speaking Americans from Hey Joe Show! YouTube channel, while the other clip showed him dancing with local teenagers at a public park. The virality of these videos may have helped him win the 2016 presidential elections. A discourse published in University of the Philippines Diliman claims that budots has become instrumental in cementing Duterte's populist posturing as a politician for the masses who is allegedly deeply immersed in Visayan culture. The captions found in DJ Love's budots dance videos, such as "Yes to Dance/ No to Drugs," can be read as support for Duterte's hardline stance on the criminalization of drug abuse.

Several Filipino politicians have used budots to attract voters, most notably Ramon Bong Revilla Jr., who ran for senator in 2019. He appeared in a national television advertisement dancing to budots music, which critics pointed out failed to mention any governance plans during his campaign. Revilla won the 11th Senate seat (out of 12), even doing a little dance after the official proclamation. DJ Love claimed Revilla used his track without permission and demanded compensation from Camus Girls, the dance group that popularized the choreography. Revilla's political advertisement was listed as one of the best Filipino internet memes in 2019. In a column for Daily Tribune, Larry Faraon wrote that Revilla's victory by dancing to budots reflected the culture of elections in the Philippines. Senator Panfilo Lacson lamented the "pathetic" situation of Filipino voters who are easily swayed by stage performances of election candidates, such as cracking jokes and dancing to budots.

Then-Davao City Mayor Sara Duterte-Carpio (daughter of President Duterte) questioned the use of the 1976 song Manila by Hotdog during the parade of Team Philippines at the 2019 Southeast Asian Games opening ceremony. She claimed the title is capital-centric and did not represent the whole country, even suggesting to use budots instead since her fellow Davaoeños "invented" it.

== See also ==
- Music of the Philippines
  - Tagonggo
- Electronic dance music
  - House music
  - Hardstyle
  - Techno music
- Electronic Dance Music genres in Southeast Asia
  - Funkot
  - Full Bass
  - Vinahouse
