= Bulaklak Sa Buwan =

2024 single by Ely Buendia

Single by Ely Buendia

from the album Method Adaptor
- Released: August 16, 2024
- Genre: Alternative rock
- Length: 4:56
- Label: Sony Music Philippines; Offshore Music
- Songwriter: Ely Buendia
- Producer: Jerome Velasco

Ely Buendia singles chronology
"Metro" (2021)	"Bulaklak Sa Buwan" (2024)	"Tagpi-Tagping Piraso" (2024)

"Bulaklak Sa Buwan" (lit. 'Flower on the Moon') is a song by Filipino musician Ely Buendia from his second solo album, Method Adaptor. It was released as a single on August 16, 2024, with an accompanying music video.

== Composition ==
Written by Buendia, the song is about misinformation and propaganda. "I've been watching documentaries a lot, and I tried to distill everything in one song," Buendia explained. He also stated that the song is open to interpretation. “I made sure it doesn’t sound like ‘this is what I feel should be what the world is.’ It's not fact," he continued. "I wanted to make people kind of also think about the song they’re listening to… [that] there’s participation on their part.”

The title came from a book on misinformation that Buendia had read, which contained a passage on “stuff being as rare as a flower from Mars”. He changed Mars to the moon (“buwan”) “because it sounded nicer to the ears,” he explained.

Produced by Buendia's longtime collaborator Jerome Velasco, the song's sound has been described as a "pristine pop gem" balanced by "sharp melodies and ferocious guitar work". It has also been compared to the Eraserheads album Sticker Happy (1997) and Buendia's other band Pupil. The song's melody took five years to write. Buendia wanted the song to sound as “tight” and “current” as possible so people can “be focused on what the song is saying” and not be “thrown off by the sonics of it”.

The song was remixed by DJ Love, best known for popularizing the budots genre, for Method Adaptor Remixed (2025).

== Music video ==
The music video, which was directed by Niko Cezar and Aimee Aznar of the KNYA Collective, was released alongside the single. It shows Buendia searching for a rare flower in the woods.

About working with the music video's directors, Buendia said: “I didn’t have a specific idea but I liked their pitch. Since we were working with a relatively small budget, I thought that I would just let them decide on the concept, because they knew best how to maximize the resources."

== Accolades ==
Awards and nominations for "Bulaklak Sa Buwan"
Organization	Year	Category	Result	Ref.
Wish 107.5	2025 Wish 107.5 Music Awards	Song of the Year (Rock/Alternative)	Nominated	
