= Full Flood =

2018 studio album by Apartel

Studio album by Apartel
- Released: October 3, 2018
- Studio: Crow's Nest
- Genre: Soul; funk
- Length: 46:06
- Label: Offshore Music
- Producer: Ely Buendia

Apartel chronology
Inner Play (2016)	Full Flood (2018)

Singles from Full Flood
- 1. "Pateros" Released: June 15, 2018; 2. "Sisid" Released: October 11, 2018; 3. "Pre-Loved" Released: October 20, 2020

Full Flood is the second studio album by the Filipino soul and R&B supergroup Apartel, released on October 3, 2018, through Offshore Music.

== Music and lyrics ==
The album features more contributions from vocalist Ely Buendia's bandmates. "We did it for us," he said. "The sound varies first of all because it’s not just me who wrote the songs. The whole band co-wrote it with me." The album's sound has been described as being influenced by Manila Sound and Paul Weller's band The Style Council.

== Release ==
The band released the first single from Full Flood, "Pateros", in June 2018.

Offshore Music released Full Flood in October 2018. Mastered by Bernie Grundman, it was later released on limited edition vinyl in June 2020. A music video for the album's second single "Sisid" was premiered the following month.

The band released a live performance video for "Pre-Loved" featuring Zia Quizon in October 2020.

== Track listing ==
Full Flood track listing
No.	Title	Writer(s)	Length
1.	"That's What She Said"	Ely Buendia	3:42
2.	"Pateros"	Buendia; Coco Coo; Audry Dionisio	5:35
3.	"See It to Believe It"	Buendia	3:32
4.	"Mahiwaga"	Buendia	5:10
5.	"Sisid"	Pat Sarabia; Kyle Quismondo	4:51
6.	"Underboner"	Coo	1:59
7.	"Pre-Loved" (featuring Zia Quizon)	Buendia	3:09
8.	"Quack King"	Buendia; Redge Concepcion	4:08
9.	"Ako Ang Dagat, Ikaw Ang Buwan"	Jun Lazo	4:18
10.	"Can I Be So High"	Buendia	5:03
11.	"Why You Gotta Do Me Like That?"	Buendia; Dionisio	4:39
Total length:			46:06

== Personnel ==
Apartel

- Ely Buendia – vocals, bass
- Coco Coo – guitars
- Redge Concepcion – guitars
- Jun Lazo – bass
- Ryan Goan – keyboards
- Deej Rodriguez – percussion
- Pat Sarabia – drums, percussion
- Telay Robles – backup vocals

Production

- Ely Buendia – producer
- Bernie Grundman – mastering
