= List of songs about Manila =

This is a list of songs about Manila, set there, or named after a location or feature of the city.

== Songs ==
- "A Orillas del Pasig" by José Rizal (1876)
- "Agila ng Maynila" by Freddie Aguilar (1988)
- "Alabang Girls" by Andrew E. (1992)
- "Anak ng Pasig" by Smokey Mountain (1990)
- "Ang Huling El Bimbo" by Eraserheads (1995)
- "Awit ng Maynila" by Antonio Villegas (1966)
- "City of Hope" by Journey (2011)
- "¿Donde vas con mantón de Manila?" by Tomás Bretón (1894)
- "eine nacht in manila" by Bilderbuch (2018)
- "Haligi ng Maynila" by The Jerks (1997)
- "Hari ng Tondo" by Gloc-9 ft. Denise Barbacena (2011)
- "Isang Probinsyano sa Maynila" by Ebe Dancel (2011)
- "Kalesa" by Sylvia La Torre (1959)
- "Kyusi" by Zild (2021)
- "La Flor de Manila" by Dolores Paterno (1879)
- "Limang Dipang Tao" by Lea Salonga (1994)
- "Mahal Kong Maynila" by Kakai Bautista and Vince De Jesus (2002)
- "Man From Manila" by Francis Magalona (1991)
- "Manila" by Amber Rowley (2006)
- "Manila" by Hotdog (1973)
- "Manila" by Sandwich (2008)
- "Manila" by Seelenluft (2002)
- "Manila Anthem" by Jump Smokers ft. Audiobot (2013)
- "Manila, Manila, Manila" by Los Panchos (1958)
- "Manila Girl" by Put3ska (1995)
- "Manila Street" by Amy Speace (2011)
- "Manila Teenage Death Squad" by Chicosci (2006)
- "Maynila" by Introvoys (1989)
- "Maynila" by Loonie (2010)
- "Maynila" by Noel Cabangon (2015)
- "Modelong Charing" by Blakdyak (1997)
- "Mutya ng Pasig" by Nicanor Abelardo (1926)
- "My Backyard (The Moon Over Manila)" by Catfish (1988)
- "Nasusunog ang Maynila" by Radioactive Sago Project (2007)
- "Pamaypay ng Maynila" by Sylvia La Torre (1954)
- "Pasko sa Maynila" by Ariel Rivera (1996)
- "Probinsyana" by Bamboo (2007)
- "¿Qué hago en Manila?" by Virus (1983)
- "Raining in Manila" by Lola Amour (2023)
- "Saan" by Maki (2023)
- "Shopping" by Ryan Bang ft. Donnalyn Bartolome (2015)
- "Swerte-Swerte Lang" by Joel P. Navarro (1978)
- "The Belle of Manila" by Louise Haack McLay (1898)
- "The Tribute to Manila" by Love Like Blood (1989)
- "Thrilla in Manila" by Greyson Chance (2014)

== See also ==
- Manila Sound
