= Balik Probinsya =

Philippine economic migration program

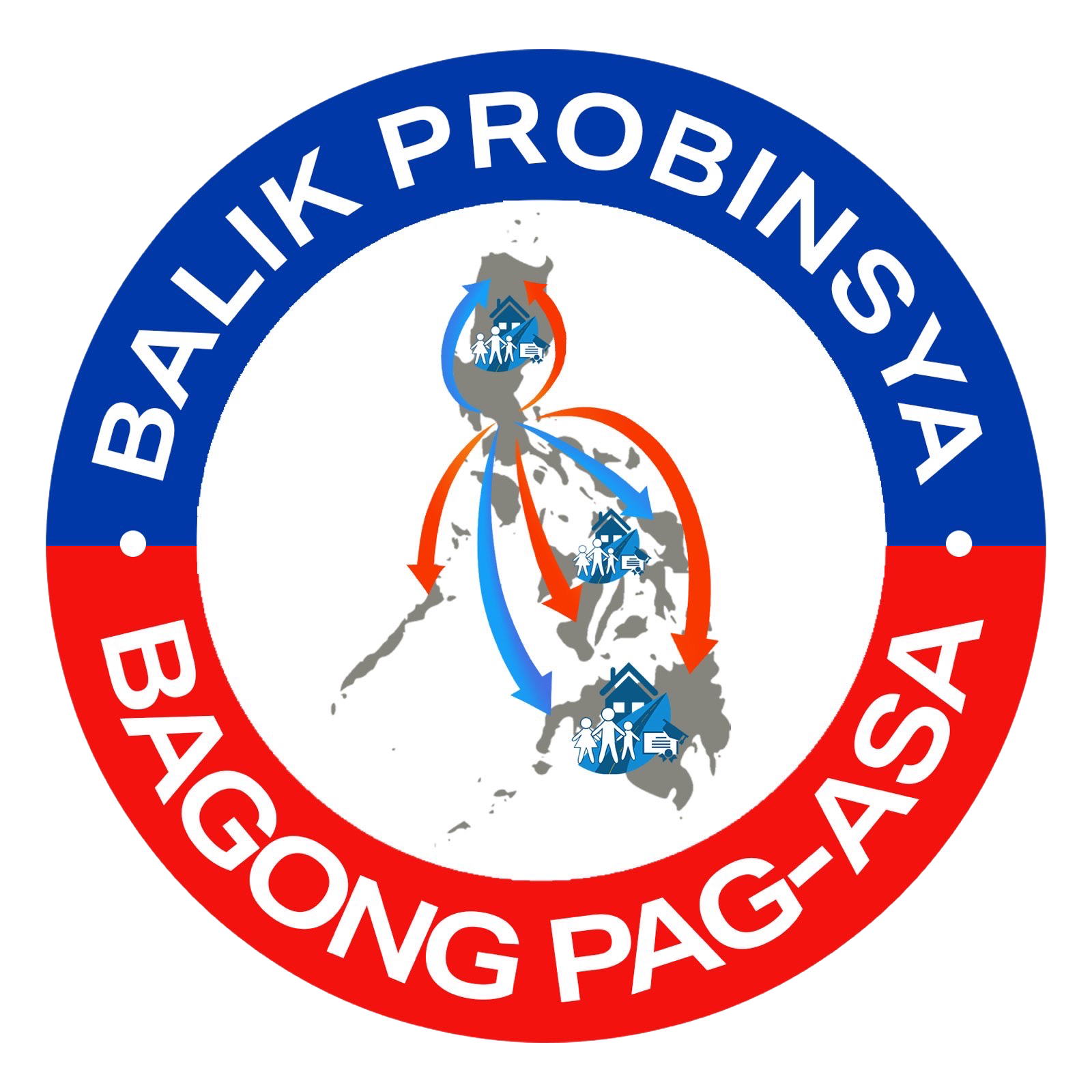
Logo of the Balik Probinsya program

Balik Probinsya, Bagong Pag-asa (abbreviated as BP2; literally "Return to the Province, New Hope"), or simply Balik Probinsya, is a socioeconomic program by the Philippine government to reverse the migration of people to Metro Manila and other urban areas, who were originally from more rural areas of the country.

== History ==
Executive Order No. 114 signed by President Rodrigo Duterte on May 6, 2020

The Balik Probinsya program was originally proposed by Senator Bong Go. Go touted the program as a platform to give a "fresh start" to people after the COVID-19 pandemic by implementing a series of programs to help develop the quality of life in rural areas, in effect decongesting the densely populated areas of the country such as Metro Manila by encouraging people to move to the countryside once COVID-19-related quarantine measures imposed across the country are lifted. Go argued that if Metro Manila had a lower population density, the government would be better equipped in dealing with future health emergencies.

President Rodrigo Duterte issued Executive Order (EO) No. 114 on May 6 which took effect immediately, institutionalizing the Balik Probinsya program. An inter-agency council was also established to formulate the framework of the program within 30 days. Executive Secretary Salvador Medialdea was appointed to lead the council.

To reverse migration to the NCR and other congested metropolises, as well as to attain rural prosperity through equitable distribution of wealth, resources and opportunities, a balanced regional development program to foster socially cohesive, resilient and sustainable rural communities needs to be institutionalized

— Part of the Executive Order (EO) No. 114 (2020) describing the intent of the Balik Probinsya program.

The implementation of the program was suspended on June 11, to give more focus on aiding non-Metro Manila residents get back to their home provinces and cities under the separate Hatid Tulong program.

== Council ==
President Duterte's executive order created the Balik Probinsya, Bagong Pag-asa Council, which is tasked to create a framework for the national government's implementation of the Balik Probinsya program. The composition of the council as follows:

- Chairperson: Executive Secretary
- Vice Chairperson: Socioeconomic Planning Secretary
- Other members:
  - Secretaries of Agriculture, Agrarian Reform, Budget and Management, Environment and Natural Resources, Education, Human Settlements and Urban Development, Finance, Health, Information and Communications Technology, Interior and Local Government, Labor and Employment, Public Works and Highways, Social Welfare and Development, Trade and Industry, Tourism, Transportation
  - Chairperson of the Commission on Higher Education
  - Director General of the Technical Education and Skills Development Authority
  - Head of Cooperative Development Authority
  - Head of Mindanao Development Authority

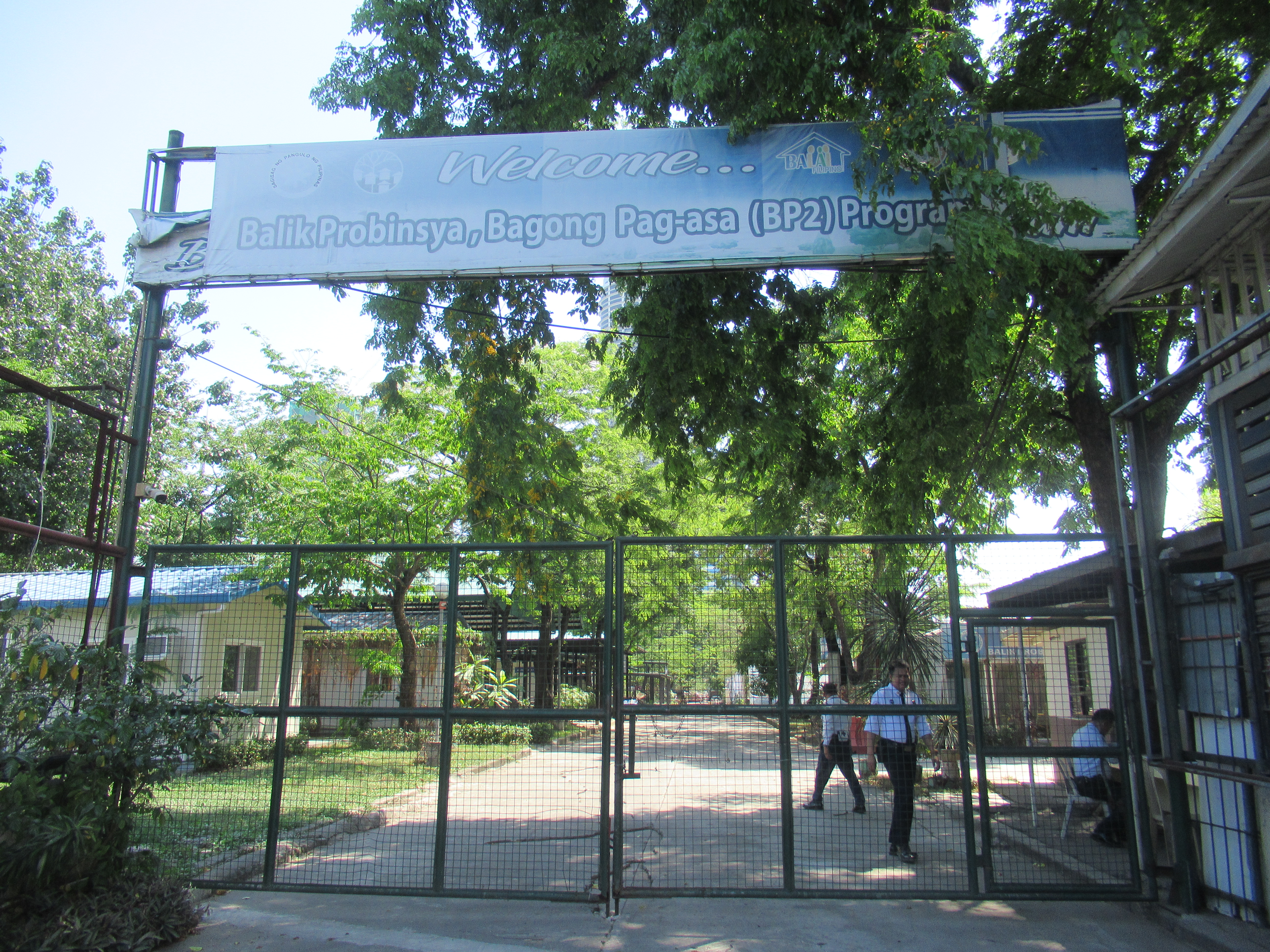
Welcome arch (BP2 Depot in Quezon City )

== Program ==
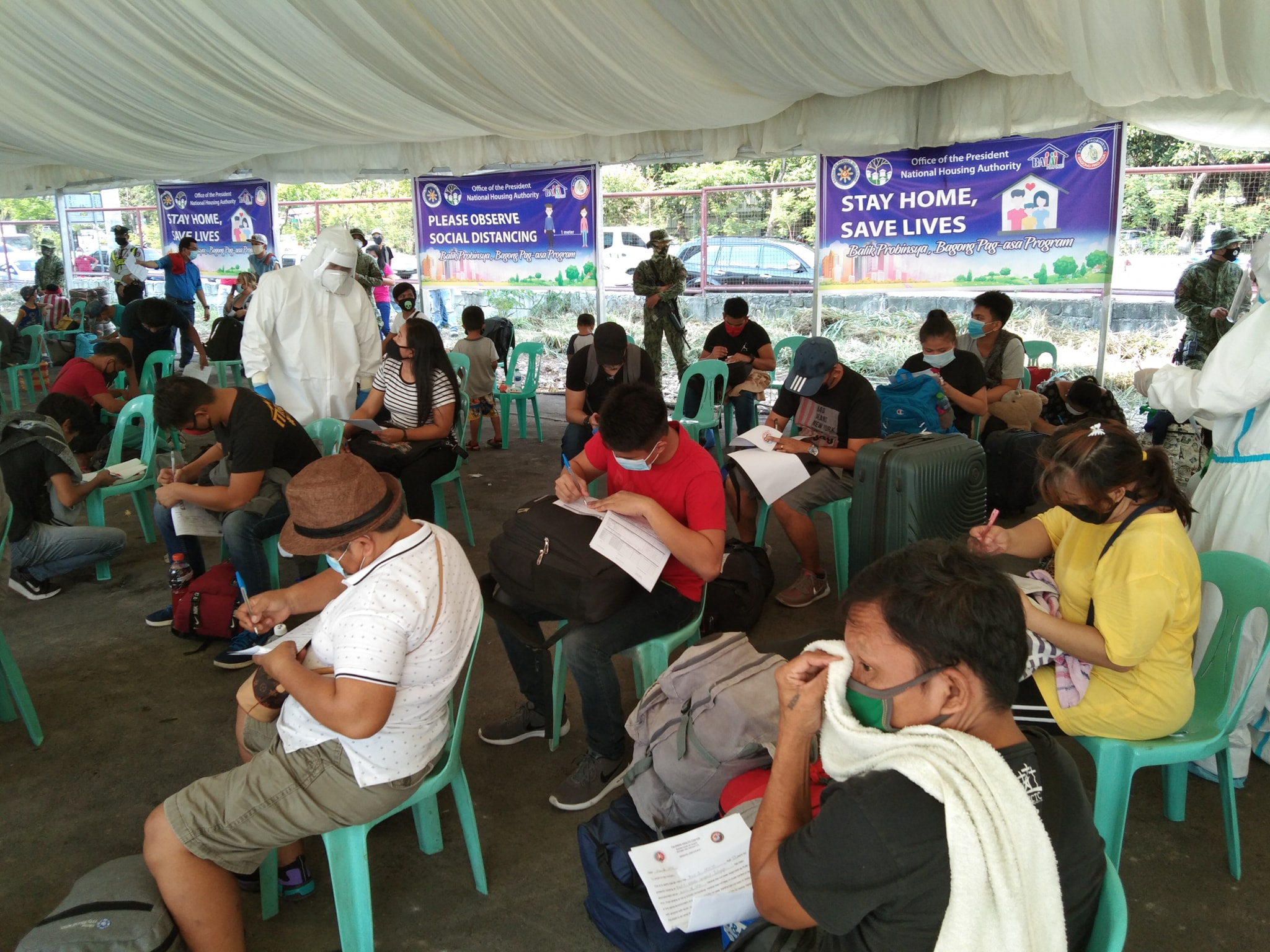
Balik Probinsya enrollees at a processing center in Quezon City.

The National Housing Authority (Philippines) (NHA) says that around 10,000 people have expressed interest in benefiting from the program within the first two or three days of the program's launch. Among the top ten provinces applicants want to move to are Camarines Sur, Bohol, Leyte, and Samar. The NHA has pledged to provide available houses to beneficiaries of the program and their voter registration will be adjusted accordingly by the Commission on Elections.

== Controversies ==
The Gabriela Women's Party has criticized the Balik Probinsya program, saying it could create a "wave" of new COVID-19 cases amidst the pandemic situation, and citing two alleged Balik Probinsya beneficiaries in Leyte testing positive for the disease. They also believe the program is proof of the government's preference for temporary relief over long-term solutions and the program will bring more socioeconomic problems in the countryside. However the Department of Interior and Local Government disputed Gabriela's claims, saying that the two Leyte cases involved beneficiaries of a separate program, Hatid Probinsya, which aims to help non-residents stranded in Metro Manila to return to their home provinces, and insists that the Balik Probinsya program is a long-term solution which seeks to provide a platform for low-income families in urban areas to move to their home provinces while implementing relevant livelihood and infrastructure programs in the rural areas of the country.

== See also ==
- Imperial Manila
