= Inner Play =

2016 studio album by Apartel

Studio album by Apartel
- Released: July 10, 2016
- Studio: The Bunker
- Genre: Soul; R&B
- Length: 55:27
- Label: Offshore Music
- Producer: Ely Buendia; Jay Ortega

Apartel chronology
Inner Play (2016)	Full Flood (2018)

Singles from Inner Play
- 1. "Is It Hip?" Released: September 17, 2016; 2. "Sala Sa Init" Released: March 30, 2017; 3. "Guijo St. (Makes You Wonder)" Released: November 9, 2017

Inner Play is the debut studio album by the Filipino soul and R&B supergroup Apartel, released on July 10, 2016, through Offshore Music.

== Background ==
Eraserheads and Pupil vocalist Ely Buendia formed Apartel in early 2016 with Gnash and DRT frontman Jay Ortega. Buendia had wanted to incorporate a big band sound to his live repertoire, adding a horn section to his recent solo concert to reinterpret Eraserheads songs with the big band sound. “I wanted to put a twist on the old songs,” he explained. “I finally was able to afford these musicians like the horn players. I’m pretty proud of the production because there’s nothing like it in the mainstream. And I’m proud of the arrangements of the old songs.” Many of the band members had listened to soul music at their early age from artists such as Earth, Wind & Fire, Stevie Wonder, Michael Jackson, and VST & Company.

== Release ==
Inner Play was first released through Buendia's record label Offshore Music in July. A music video for the lead single “Is It Hip?” directed by Marie Jamora premiered in September. The video was nominated for Best Music Video at the 2017 MYX Music Awards. The album was later released on vinyl in November.

In January 2017, the band announced that Ortega had left the group to focus on his solo career. The band released their second single “Sala sa Init” in April, with a giallo-inspired music video directed by drummer Pat Sarabia and Buendia's partner Audry Dionisio. They also directed the music video for the third single “Guijo St. (Makes You Wonder)”, released in November.

An EP featuring remixes of songs from Inner Play by Tandem 91, Tarsius, BP Valenzuela, Lustbass, and Couchlab was released to streaming services in November 2017. It was previously released as the second disc of the album's deluxe CD version.

== Track listing ==
Inner Play track listing
No.	Title	Writer(s)	Length
1.	"Is It Hip?"	Ely Buendia; Jay Ortega	5:08
2.	"Attraction"	Ortega	6:16
3.	"Better off"	Buendia	3:43
4.	"Sinta"	Ortega	3:49
5.	"Sala Sa Init"	Buendia	5:00
6.	"Ako Na Lang Sana"	Ortega	4:01
7.	"Guijo St. (Makes You Wonder)"	Buendia	5:00
8.	"Foolin’ Around"	Ortega	4:09
9.	"Designated Driver"	Buendia	3:43
10.	"WTF"	Buendia; Ortega; Redge Concepcion	3:53
11.	"Careless Love"	Buendia	3:49
12.	"On the Other Side"	Ortega	6:56
Total length:			55:27

Disc 2 of limited edition CD release / Full Flood (Remixes)
No.	Title	Length
1.	"Overture"	3:26
2.	"Better Off" (Tandems 91 Remix)	4:09
3.	"Designated Driver" (Tarsius Remix)	6:30
4.	"Is It Hip?" (Pasta Groove's Lowdown Dirty Remix)	2:59
5.	"Careless Love" (Sleepypasta Remix)	3:46
6.	"Sala Sa Init" (Lustbass Remix)	3:46
7.	"Guijo Street" (Couchlab Remix)	5:21

- Note: “Overture” was track 1 on the first disc of the CD release. It was later assigned as track 1 for the streaming release of the second disc.

== Personnel ==
Apartel

- Ely Buendia – vocals, bass
- Jay Ortega – vocals
- Pat Sarabia – drums, percussion
- Coco Coo – guitars
- Redge Concepcion – guitars
- RJ Pineda – piano, electric piano, organ, 12-string acoustic

with

- Louie Talan – bass (track 4)
- Buddy Zabala – bass (tracks 3, 8)
- Nitoy Adriano – guitar solo (track 7)
- Wendell Garcia – drums (tracks 6, 8)
- Deej Rodriguez – percussion
- Jan Ortega Roy – bass (track 12)
- Cookie Chua – backup vocals (track 12)
- Miguel Hernandez – percussion (track 9)
- Donna Senoran – live backup singer
- Ramonne Rodriguez – live backup singer

Additional musicians

- Joseph Cabanero – saxophone (tracks 1, 2, 5, 10)
- Wawi Ansano – trombone (tracks 1, 2, 5, 10)
- Pards Tupas – trumpet (tracks 1, 2, 5, 10)
- Roxy Modesto – saxophone (tracks 1, 3, 8)
- Roderick Camarce – trumpet (tracks 1, 3, 8)
- Nino Hernandez – flute (track 5)
- Telay Robles – backup vocals
- Lily Munoz – backup vocals
- Marge Rubiano – backup vocals

Production

- Ely Buendia – producer, mixing
- Jay Ortega – producer
- Jerome Velasco – recording, premixing
- Angee Rozul – mastering
- Estran Buendia – recording assistant
- Pat Sarabia – executive producer
- Philip Florendo – executive producer
- Derick Villarino – executive producer
- Anton Bengzon – executive producer

Design

- Bijan Gorospe – design and layout
- Paulina Ortega – logo design
- Jay Ortega – logo design
