= Vinahouse =

Electronic dance music genre, originated in Vietnam

Vinahouse is a genre of electronic dance music, popularised in Vietnam.

It rose to prominence in Vietnam in the 1990s. The initial name for the genre was "nhạc bay”, “nhạc sàn”, “nhạc vũ trường"; but the eventual common name for the genre became Vinahouse. It initially emerged in various discotheques and nightclubs across Vietnam, before spreading through Vietnamese diaspora communities in western countries such as in California and Australia.

Characteristics of the genre include a fusion of Vietnamese pop-songs across various genres such as pop, rock, or country; with the sounds of house music and bass music. It has been described by resident advisor as 'a style of EDM that jacks up local pop with blistering bass'. The production is typically as a relatively high BPM, with 140 BPM not being uncommon.

DJ Hoàng Anh has been credited as the first DJ to draw global attention to this genre of dance music, having been referred to by some as 'the king of Vinahouse'. In recent years, some local collectives in Vietnam such as Nhạc Gãy have begun to distance their sound from Vinahouse, yet still engage with the genre to some degree.
