= 2019 SEA Games opening ceremony =

2019 Southeast Asian Games Opening Ceremony
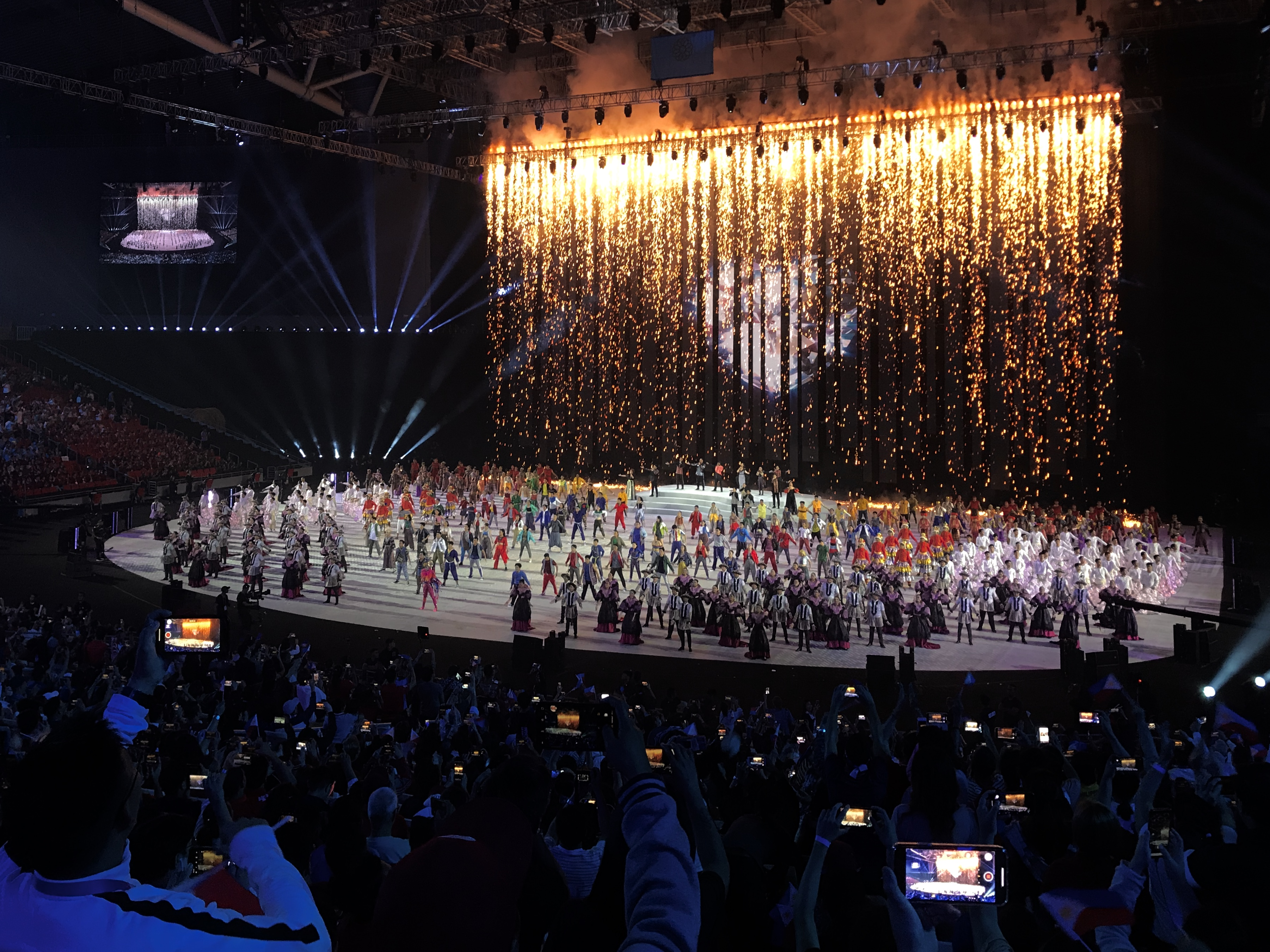
- Date: November 30, 2019
- Time: 19:00 - 20:35 PHT (UTC+08:00) (1 hour and 35 minutes)
- Location: Philippine Arena, Bocaue, Bulacan, Philippines
- Also known as: We Win As One
- Filmed by: NEP (on behalf of ABS-CBN, People's Television Network, and TV5 Network)
- Footage: The Opening Ceremony of the 30th South East Asian Games on YouTube

The opening ceremony of the 2019 Southeast Asian Games took place on the evening of Saturday, November 30, 2019, at the Philippine Arena, in Bocaue, Bulacan. The event commenced at 19:00 PST (UTC+08:00) and ended at 20:35 local time. Floy Quintos was the creative director of the ceremony. The ceremony featured LED strips and panels, which represent a bamboo forest, and was the first indoor opening ceremony of the Southeast Asian Games.

== Background ==
The opening ceremony was reportedly inspired by the opening ceremonies of the 2017 Southeast Asian Games in Kuala Lumpur, Malaysia, and the 2018 Winter Olympics in Pyeongchang, South Korea. The organizers announced plans to conduct a digital lighting of the flame during the event but added that they have a backup plan for a "normal, traditional opening ceremony". FiveCurrents, the live content creators that produced the London 2012 opening and closing ceremonies, were the producers for the 2019 Southeast Asian Games opening ceremonies together with the local producers; Video Sonic and Stage Craft.

During the rehearsals of the ceremony, the gymnast Carlos Yulo was responsible for lighting the cauldron, however at the ceremony he was replaced by boxer Manny Pacquiao. Pacquiao's presence was the big surprise of this ceremony.

Filipino-American artist Apl.de.ap of The Black Eyed Peas performed for the opening ceremony. Collaborating with Ryan Cayabyab, he performed a remix of his troupe's song rendered in Filipino traditional instruments and orchestral accompaniment. Previously the organizers negotiated with another Filipino-American artist, Bruno Mars, to do the same.

In August 2019, organizers planned to have local artists Lea Salonga and Arnel Pineda perform in the opening ceremony. However, on November 25, Salonga announced that she will not be able to perform due to her prior commitments with Sweeney Todd: The Demon Barber of Fleet Street. Pineda was also unable to perform.

== Preparations ==
Organizers are coordinating with the Department of Transportation regarding logistics for the games including the possible closure of the North Luzon Expressway to the public for 12 hours leading to the opening ceremony. Aside from the closure of NLEX, the Department of Public Works and Highways said that the interchange overpass bridge that is connected to NLEX will provide a road access to the Philippine Arena leading to the opening ceremony.

Around 2,000 police personnel as well as undisclosed number of personnel from Bulacan's Provincial Disaster Risk Reduction and Management Office, and the Presidential Security Group were deployed to secure the area.

== Proceedings ==
=== Pre-show ===
A preshow was held at 5:00 pm, two hours prior to the official start of the opening ceremony.

=== Welcome, national flag and anthem ===
The opening ceremony began with the introduction of two dignitaries: Philippine President Rodrigo Duterte and Bruneian Sultan Hassanal Bolkiah to the audiences, followed by a performance of the acapella version of the Philippine national anthem – "Lupang Hinirang" by Lani Misalucha, standing beside a Philippine Army personnel, who carried the flag of the Philippines fixed on a pole.

=== Countdown ===
A five-to-zero countdown of the large screens counted down from 5 to 0 in Philippines Filipino after the singing of the national anthem.

- 5 - Violet (Lima)
- 4 - Ocean Blue (Apat)
- 3 - Ginto (Tatlo)
- 2 - Magenta (Dalawa)
- 1 - Matcha Latte (Isa)
- 0 - Itim (Magsimula)

=== Main event ===
==== The Roots of Our Strength (Ugat ng Ating Lakas) ====
The first production part was entitled "The Roots of Our Strength" (Ugat ng Ating Lakas), featured a dance production by Ramon Obusan Folkloric Group and dance troupes from different colleges and universities, starting with Sarimanok dances and traditional dances including the Ginum of the Bagobo from the Mindanao highlands, the Pattong of the Kalinga people of Northern Luzon, a dance inspired by the pre-Hispanic self-defense art of Arnis, the Sagayan from Maguindanao, and the Singkil of the Maranao people from Lanao. The soundtrack is based from the musical "Misa", composed by local musician Ryan Cayabyab.

==== The Honor of Competition (Dangal) ====
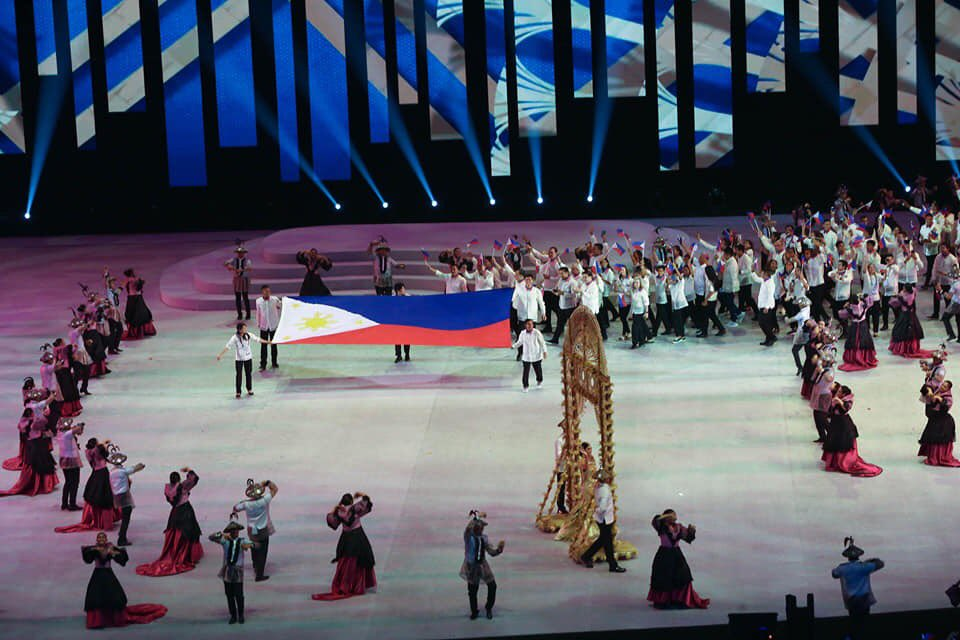
The Philippine delegation.

The second part of the show, entitled "The Honor of Competition" (Dangal), featured the La Jota Manileña dance, a blend of both Hispanic and pre-Hispanic style. Then, the parade of athletes started. As per tradition, the participating nations entered in alphabetical order, and finally by the host nation Philippines entering to Hotdog's hit song "Manila". The parade is inspired by the Flores de Mayo festival and 11 historical Filipina beauty titleholders served as muses for each of the 11 participating countries while two men are carrying a singkaban, a decorated bamboo arch usually used in Bulacan. The arches are used as a creative way to present the name of the participating Southeast Asian countries. Robert Seña performed a welcoming song to the tune of "Kay Ganda ng Ating Musika."

Muses of SEA Games 2019
Country	Muse	Beauty Pageant Title
Cambodia	Sophia Senoron	Miss Multinational 2018
Brunei Darussalam	Karen Gallman	Miss Intercontinental 2018
Indonesia	Megan Young	Miss World 2013
Laos	Cynthia Thomalla	Miss Eco International 2018
Malaysia	Lara Quigaman	Miss International 2005
Myanmar	Karen Ibasco	Miss Earth 2017
Philippines	Pia Alonzo Wurtzbach	Miss Universe 2015
Singapore	Jamie Herrell	Miss Earth 2014
Thailand	Angelia Ong	Miss Earth 2015
Timor Leste	Jannie Alipo-on	Miss Tourism International 2017
Vietnam	Sharifa Akeel	Miss Asia Pacific International 2018

==== Speeches and Protocol ====
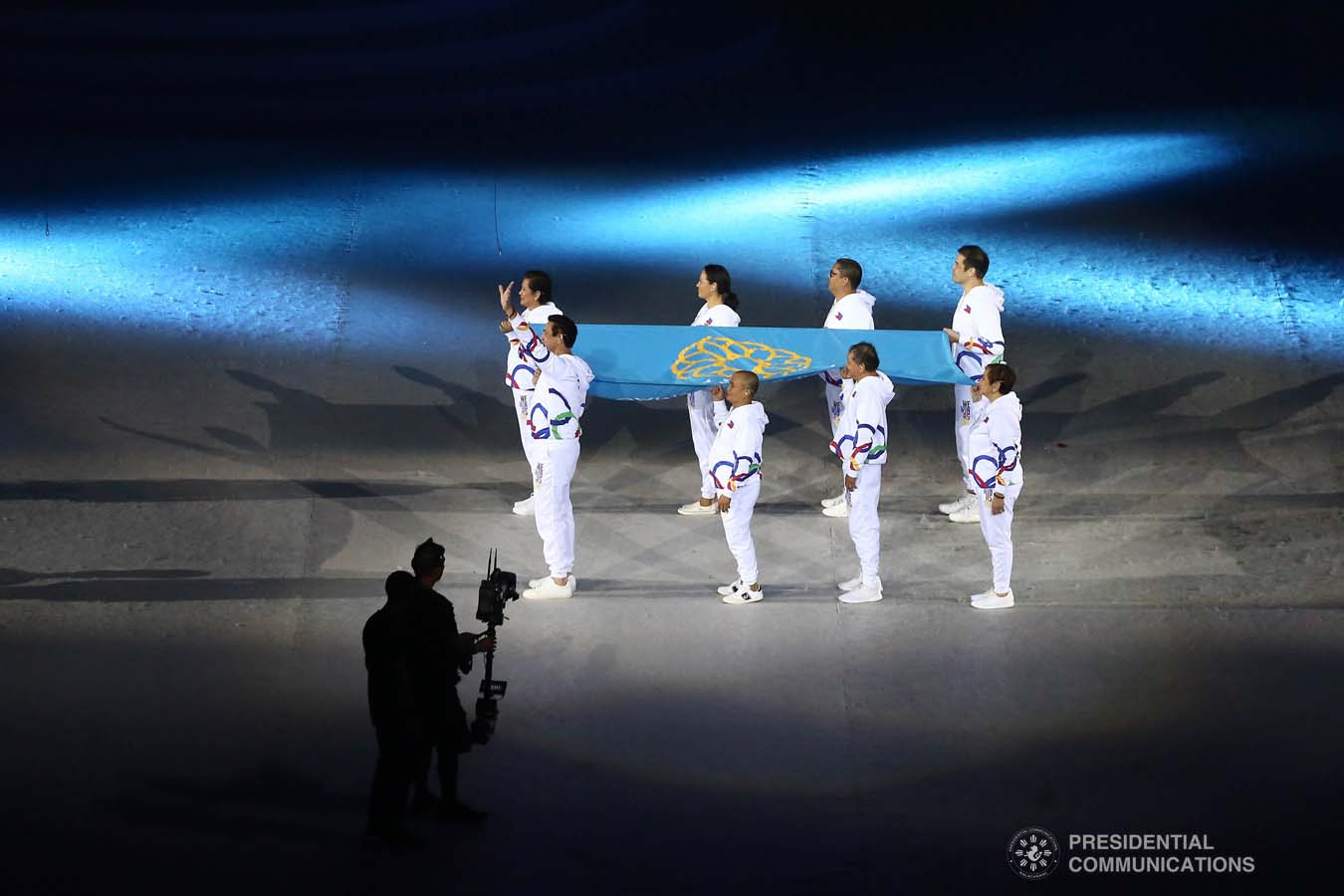
The flag of the Southeast Asian Games Federation flag being carried by eight Filipino sporting legends.

Alan Peter Cayetano, Speaker of the House of Representatives of the Philippines and Philippine Southeast Asian Games Organizing Committee (PHISGOC) chairman, delivered the first speech in the ceremony. He spoke about the ceremony, as a gathering of the Southeast Asian community that seeks to build a better world. He emphasized that the values of passion, sacrifice, discipline, teamwork, and respect, that is shown by the athletes, are everything that is needed for a better world. He continued to speak about the rich diversity of Southeast Asia. He ended his speech, saying "that through love - we pray as one, we build as one, we work as one, and We Win As One."

Member of the Philippine House of Representatives from the 8th District of Cavite and Philippine Olympic Committee President Abraham Tolentino was the next one to speak. He began by welcoming all delegates from the 11 participating countries, members of the international media and other guests. He spoke about how preparations for the SEA Games have been challenging, and that all the hard work put into the preparations was paid off. He also spoke about the opening ceremony as a "defining moment" for the country, showcasing what it has to offer. He emphasized that the 14-year wait for the Philippines to host the SEA Games is over, and that how the power of sports to unify the region, despite the diversity in culture, race, and religion. After he ended his speech, he invited President Rodrigo Duterte to formally open the 30th Southeast Asian Games.

I declare open the Southeast Asian Games for the 30th time. Celebrating the games of Southeast Asia. Mabuhay kayong lahat.

— President Duterte

After which, the flag of the Southeast Asian Games Federation was carried by eight Filipino sporting legends:

- Lydia de Vega (Track and Field; nine-time SEA Games gold medalist and two-time Asian Games gold medalist; considered as Asia's fastest woman in the 1980s.)
- Akiko Thomson-Guevara (Swimming; seven-time SEA Games gold medalist.)
- Eric Buhain (Swimming; 13-time SEA Games gold medalist.)
- Alvin Patrimonio (Basketball; four-time PBA Most Valuable Player and SEA Games gold medalist.)
- Bong Coo (Bowling; 1981 Southeast Asian Games gold medalist, five-time Asian Games gold medalist and four-time Ten-pin bowling World Champion.)
- Efren "Bata" Reyes (Billiards; four-time World Eight-ball Champion, 2002 Asian Games bronze medalist and four-time SEA Games bronze medalist.)
- Mansueto "Onyok" Velasco Jr. (Boxing; two-time SEA Games gold medalist, 1994 Asian Games gold medalist, and 1996 Summer Olympics silver medalist.)
- Rafael "Paeng" Nepomuceno (Bowling; 1991 Southeast Asian Games gold medalist, 2002 Asian Games gold medalist and four-time Bowling World Cup champion.)

The flag was raised by members of the Philippine Army Band.

This was followed by the oath-taking led by Francesca Altomonte (softball) for the athletes and Daren Vitug (esports) for the officials.

==== The Energy of the People (Sigla) ====
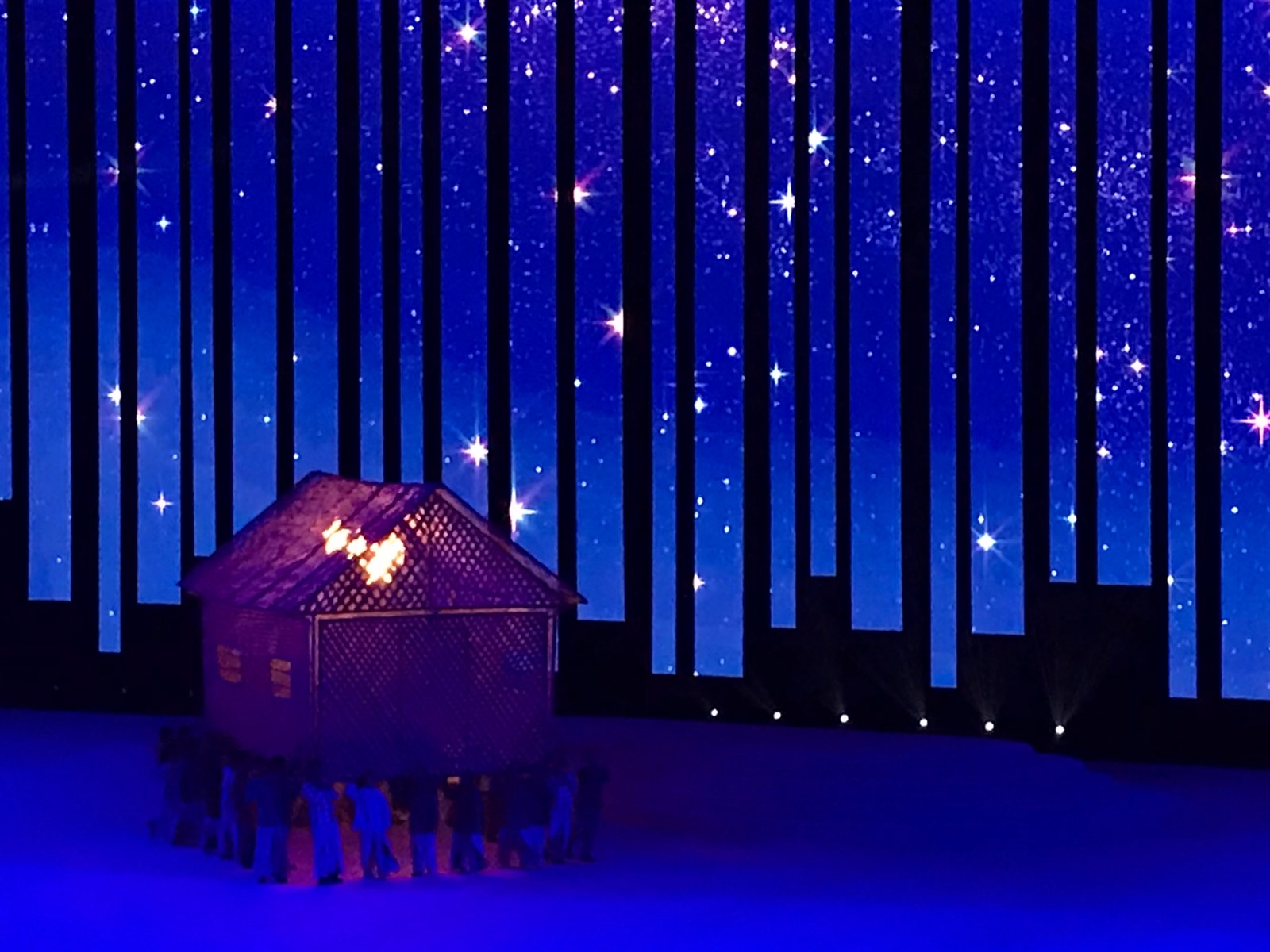
"The Energy of the People" featured the Bahay Kubo.

The third production suite called "The Energy of the People" (Sigla), featured Christian Bautista and Aicelle Santos singing a rendition of "Minamahal Kita", with a bahay kubo being carried into the middle, representing Bayanihan. The song rendition represents the courtship tradition of "Harana" (serenade). After which, hip-hop dancers explode from the bahay kubo, with Iñigo Pascual, Elmo Magalona, and KZ Tandingan singing "Mga Kababayan", "Man From Manila", and "Tayo'y Mga Pinoy", as a tribute to the late Francis Magalona. Black Eyed Peas' apl.de.ap then performed the song Bebot. At this segment, the LED backdrop featured the indigenous Indic script Baybayin, street art which depicts street games played by Filipino children, the Pis Syabit textile of the Tausug people, and the modern tattoo patterns inspired by Kalinga Warrior Status.

==== We Win As One (Pagkakaisa) ====
The final segment of the ceremony entitled "We Win As One" (Pagkakaisa) began with a dance that featured capiz lanterns, held by dancers, creating various formations. After which, all of the performers and dancers came to the stage to sing the official theme song, "We Win As One". The opening ceremony ending with in between the last final closing the end song, a video was shown featuring Filipino boxing icon Manny Pacquiao and 2019 AIBA Women's World Boxing Championships winner Nesthy Petecio, lighting the cauldron at the New Clark City Sports Complex. Innumerable dazzling fireworks were launched from the top of the "bowl rim". Then, numerous festival fireworks formed a huge circle of extravaganza, fireworks were fired in a one-off event from all New Clark City, launching from the top of the building outwards above the many spectators and well wishers below, Fireworks were launched in the shape and colour in a display that all minutes compared to being reduced to full minutes, symbolizing the successful. The closing ceremony ended at 20:35 PHT.

== Performers ==
The following artists and musicians performed during the opening ceremony: All of the performers sang "We Win As One", the official theme song of the 2019 Southeast Asian Games during the final part of the opening ceremony.

- Lani Misalucha (performing "Lupang Hinirang" (Philippine National Anthem) and "We Win As One")
- Christian Bautista (performing "Minamahal Kita" and "We Win As One")
- Aicelle Santos (performing "Minamahal Kita" and "We Win As One")
- Jed Madela (performing "We Win As One")
- Elmo Magalona (performing "Man From Manila" and "We Win As One")
- KZ Tandingan (performing "Tayo'y Mga Pinoy" and "We Win As One")
- Iñigo Pascual (performing "Mga Kababayan" and "We Win As One")
- The TNT Boys (performing "We Win As One")
- Anna Fegi (performing "We Win As One")
- Robert Seña (performing "Kay Ganda ng Pilipinas" (to the tune of Kay Ganda ng Ating Musika) and "We Win As One")
- apl.de.ap (performing "Bebot" and "We Win As One")

== Anthems ==
- (Philippines) Lani Misalucha - Lupang Hinirang, Philippine National Anthem

== Notable guests ==
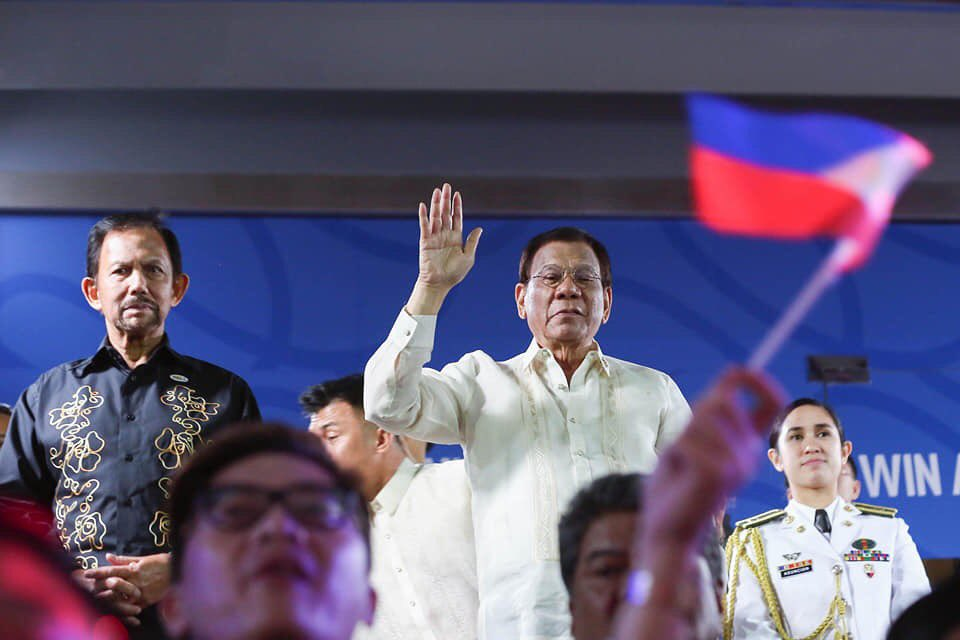
Philippine President Rodrigo Duterte (center) with Brunei Sultan Hassanal Bolkiah (left).

- Rodrigo Duterte, President of the Philippines
- Vicente Sotto III, Senate President of the Philippines
- Alan Peter Cayetano, Speaker of the House of Representatives of the Philippines and Philippine Southeast Asian Games Organizing Committee (PHISGOC) chairman
- Salvador Medialdea, Executive Secretary of the Philippines
- Abraham Tolentino, Member of the Philippine House of Representatives from the 8th District of Cavite and president of the Philippine Olympic Committee
- Ronald Dela Rosa, Senator of the Philippines
- Bong Go, Senator of the Philippines
- Francis Tolentino, Senator of the Philippines
- Miguel Zubiri, Senator of the Philippines
- William Ramirez, chairman of the Philippine Sports Commission
- Ramon Suzara, Philippine Southeast Asian Games Organizing Committee (PHISGOC) chief operating officer

=== Foreign dignitaries ===
- Hassanal Bolkiah, Sultan and Yang di-Pertuan of Brunei Darussalam
- Wei Jizhong, Vice President of the Olympic Council of Asia

== Reception ==
According to Kantar Media, the opening ceremony drew a large television audience. With a national TV rating of 29.2%, the ceremony was the most-watched program of the day.
