= Teddy Cream =

- Origin: Melbourne, Australia
- Genres: EDM; house; Melbourne Bounce
- Years active: 2010–present
- Labels: Ministry of Sound
- Members: Vince Calderone, Brandon Mangion

Teddy Cream are an Australian producer and DJ duo, consisting of Vincent Calderone and Brandon Mangion. They describe their music as hard-hitting, energetic, and uplifting..

Teddy Cream's commercial success came in 2017 with their remix of Daryl Braithwaite's "Horses" which peaked at number 55 on the Australian ARIA Charts in July 2017.

== Biography ==
Teddy Cream's career begin with DJing at underage events around Melbourne before starting to play at well known nightclubs around Victoria and Australia. They created Bootleg recordings of Smash Mouth, Pussycat Dolls and Mary J Blige have amassed hundreds of thousands of plays on SoundCloud and the support from some of the artists themselves. In 2015, Teddy Cream toured the UK and Croatia. The duo have performed with Steve Angello, Skrillex and Steve Aoki.

== Discography ==
=== Charted singles ===
Title	Year	Peak chart positions	Label
Title	Year	AUS	Label
"Horses" with Szabo	2017	55	Hussle Records / Ministry of Sound
