= Carousel Casualties =

Filipino alternative rock band

- Origin: Manila, Philippines
- Genres: Indie pop; Alternative rock; Synthpop
- Years active: 2016–present
- Labels: Warner Music Philippines; Offshore Music
- Members: Emmie Villegas; Pau Villanueva; Ryan Pineda; Stephen "Tep" Fortes
- Past members: Jot Nicanor; Earl Garcia

Carousel Casualties is a Filipino indie/alternative rock band. It is composed of Emmie Villegas on vocals, rhythm guitar and synths, Pau Villanueva on lead guitar and backing vocals, Ryan Pineda on drums, and Stephen "Tep" Fortes on bass.

Formed in 2016, the band has been released their 2017 debut EP Madison and its 2021 debut album Static Electricity Dreams of Longevity, both serving alternative dance and synthpop tunes. They are currently signed to Offshore Music.

== Band history ==
The band starting out in 2016 as a 16-to-20 sqm. bedroom music project by frontman and main songwriter Emmie Villegas. The project was later elevated into a reformed band after his initial college friends were unavailable and were filled-in by his closest mutual friends Pau Villanueva, Jot Nicanor and Ryan Pineda.

In 2017, the band has self-released their 6-track debut EP Madison, featuring songs like "Flats" and "Leona".

In 2018, the band performed at Wanderland Music and Arts Festival; they were one of two band acts from the festival's Wander Battle band contest alongside Basically Saturday Night.

In 2019, the band has signed to major label Warner Music Philippines. They released their first single "Always" under the said label.

In 2021, the band released its debut album Static Electricity Dreams of Longevity, a 10-track list featuring previously released singles such as "Waves" and "What's On Your Mind?" among others.

In January 2024, after a brief hiatus, the band officially joined the label Offshore Music. They began release several singles including "Hindi Ko Alam", "Bakasyon" and "Nananabik", and is set to release their sophomore album Cattleya slated to release by late 2026/early 2027.

== Musical influence ==
While the band's musical taste has a blend of "chopsuey" or eclectic, they drew some inspiration from 80s bands like Tears for Fears and Depeche Mode to indie bands like The 1975.

== Band members ==
=== Current ===
- Emmie Villegas – vocals, rhythm guitar, synthesizers (2016–present)
- Pau Villanueva – lead guitar, backing vocals (2016–present)
- Ryan Pineda – drums (2016–present)
- Stephen "Tep" Fortes – bass (2024–present)

=== Past members ===
- Jot Nicanor – bass (2016–2022)
- Earl Garcia

== Discography ==
=== Studio albums ===
List of studio albums with selected details
Title	Album Details
Static Electricity Dreams of Longevity	Released: February 19, 2021 (PH); Label: Warner Music Philippines; Format: Digital download, Streaming media

=== Extended plays ===
List of extended plays with selected details
Title	EP Details
Madison	Released: June 15, 2017 (PH); Label: Self-released; Format: Digital download, Streaming media, CD

== Accolades ==
Award	Year	Category	Recipient(s)	Result	Ref.
Monster RX 93.1 Music Awards	2025	Sleeper Hit of the Year	"Hindi Ko Alam"	Won	
