= Ena Mori =

Filipino and Japanese singer-songwriter

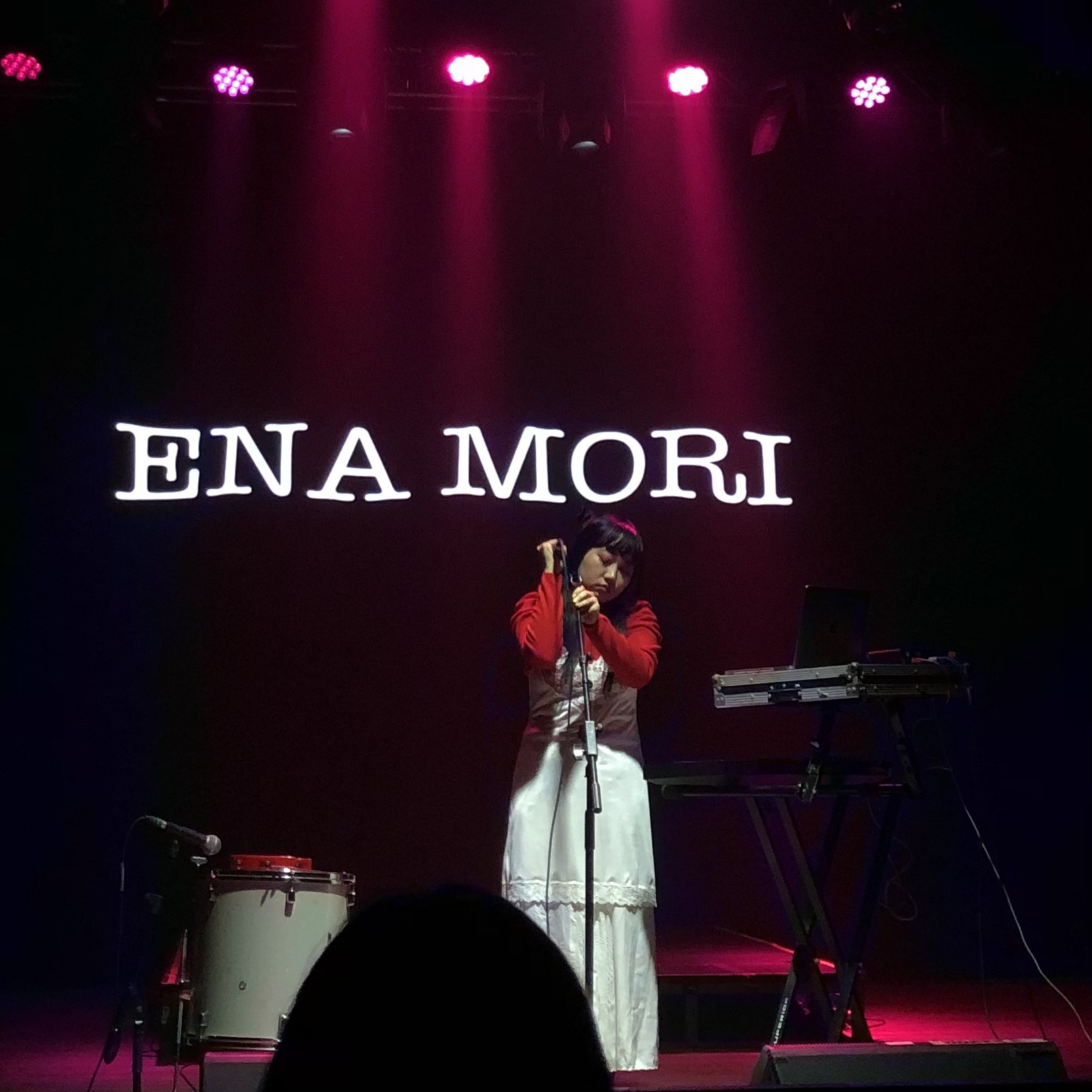
- Mori performing in 2024

Background information
- Born: Ena Patricia Mori Villa; Tokyo, Japan
- Origin: Metro Manila, Philippines
- Genres: Indie pop; electronic
- Occupations: musician; singer-songwriter; producer
- Instruments: vocals; piano; keyboards
- Years active: 2018–present
- Label: Offshore Music

Ena Patricia Mori Villa, known by her stage name Ena Mori (stylized in lowercase), is a Filipino and Japanese singer-songwriter and musician. Born in Japan, she moved to the Philippines to finish her senior highschool education in Las Piñas, Philippines. She studied Music Production in De La Salle–College of Saint Benilde from 2015 to 2019. She started pursuing her solo musical career in 2018, before launching her self-titled EP in 2020 and her debut album Don't Blame the Wild One! in 2022.

== Early years ==
Villa was born and raised in the suburb of Tokyo, Japan to a Filipino father and a Japanese mother. She later moved to the Philippines to finish high school and college education. She is the eldest of the two siblings. In her early years, she played classic piano and spent her time playing synthesizers as her habit.

== Career ==
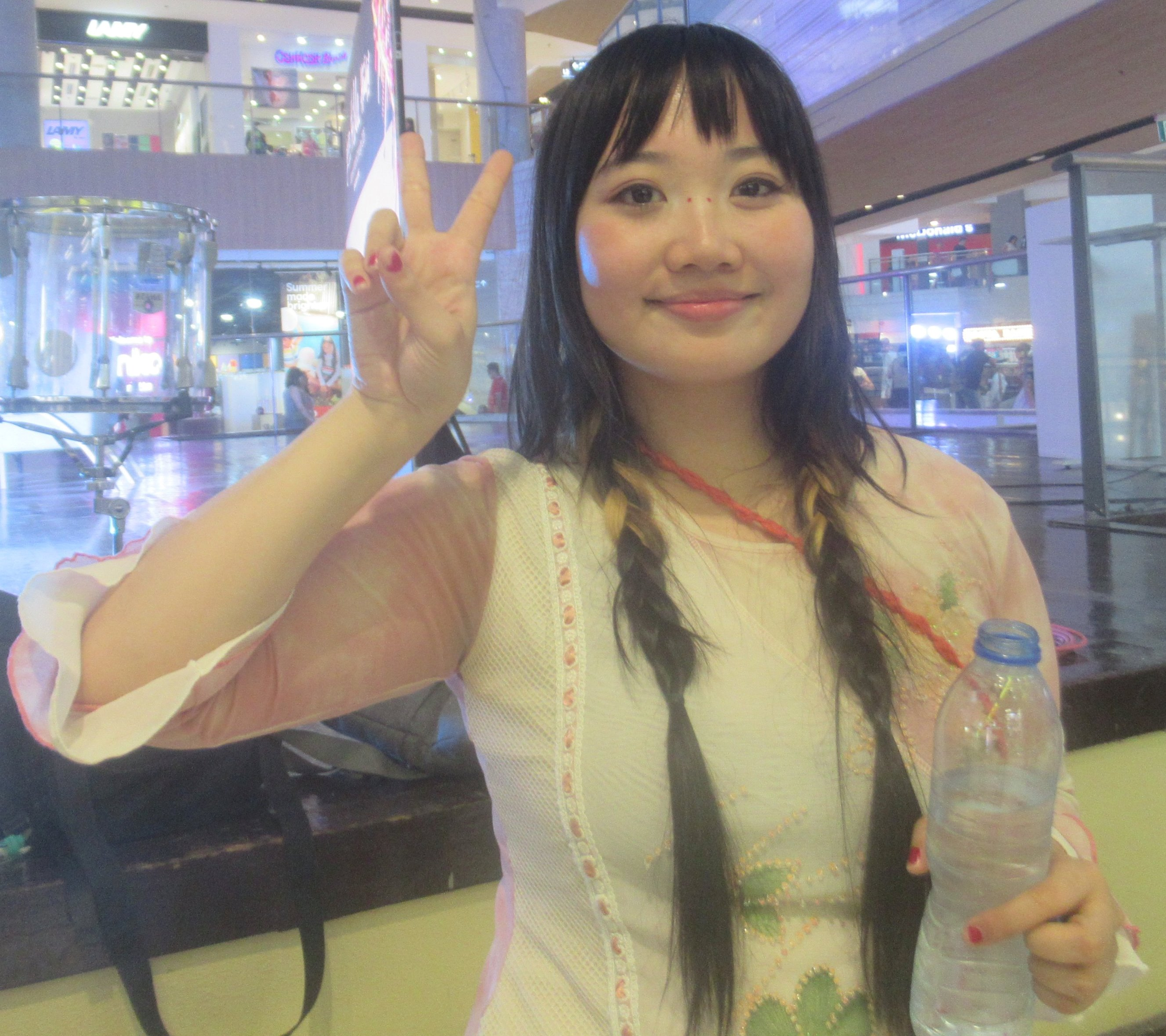
Villa in 2026

At the age of 15, Villa and her family moved to the Philippines as she prepared for college, studying music course at De La Salle–College of Saint Benilde. She initially joined the fusion band Dayaw as their keyboardist. She would later release her debut record in 2018 with "Got U Good".

In 2020, weeks before the COVID-19 pandemic, Mori released her debut self-titled EP, produced by One Click Straight drummer and producer Tim Marquez who is also Villa's batchmate at CSB.

In 2022, she released her debut album, Don't Blame the Wild One!, a 12-track list featuring hit songs like "Oh, Bleeding Hearts?", "Vivid", and "SOS". Her album later won in 2023 at the 36th Awit Awards.

In 2023, she performed at the South by Southwest (SXSW) festival in Austin, Texas.

In January 2024, she performed 4 solo shows for a UK residency with Sofar Sounds London. She is also scheduled to perform at the 2024 Wanderland festival in Manila. Later in 2024 she will perform in Australia at SXSW Sydney in October.

== Discography ==
=== Studio albums ===
Title	Album details
Don't Blame the Wild One!	Released: July 29, 2022 (PH); Label: Offshore Music; Formats: digital download, streaming

=== EPs ===
Title	Album details
ena mori	Released: February 20, 2020 (PH); Label: Offshore Music; Formats: digital download, streaming
Ore	Released: February 26, 2026; Label: Offshore Music / Sony Entertainment Philippines; Formats: digital download, streaming

== Accolades ==
Year	Award	Category	Recipient	Result	Ref
2023	36th Awit Awards	Best Album	Don't Blame the Wild One!	Won	
2026	Golden Indie Music Awards	Best Asian Creative Artist	—N/a	Won	
