= Uptown Mall =

Shopping mall in Taguig, Philippines

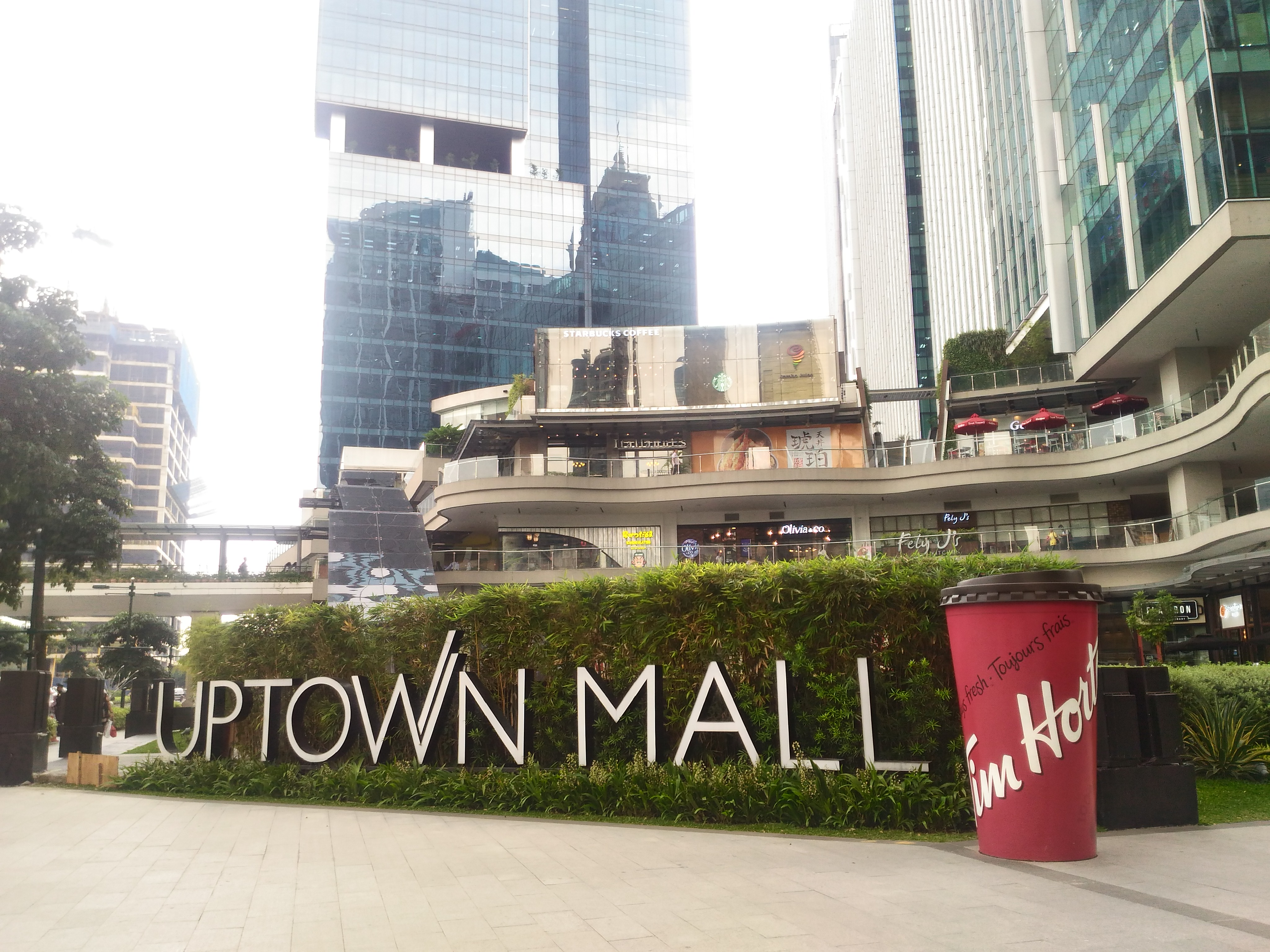
- Mall facade in 2017
- Coordinates: 14°33′23″N 121°03′16″E
- Address: 36th Street, Uptown Bonifacio, Bonifacio Global City, Taguig, Metro Manila, Philippines
- Opened: November 2015; 11 years ago
- Developer: Megaworld Corporation
- Manager: Megaworld Lifestyle Malls
- Num. of stores: 150+
- Floor area: 85,000 m^{2} (910,000 sq ft)
- Floors: Mall: 5 Carpark: 6 (from LG/B1 - B6)
- Public transit: N05 Uptown Mall; Future: MMS Kalayaan
- Website: Uptown Bonifacio

Uptown Mall is a lifestyle mall at the Bonifacio Global City in Taguig, Philippines.

== Features ==
=== Main mall ===
The Uptown Mall has five levels, including a lower ground level and six basement parking levels, starting from the Lower Ground Level (or Basement 1) to Basement 6.

The shopping mall also has a cinema with five theater auditoriums, including the Ultra Cinema with fully reclining La-Z-Boy seats and the Uptown Tempur Cinema (Cinema 3) with adjustable Tempur beds. Uptown Cinemas has the Boozy Bar, the country's first cinema cocktail bar.

The mall has an open-air area at the fourth level called The Deck, which hosts the St. Gabriel the Archangel Chapel, a Roman Catholic chapel, and restaurants offering al fresco dining. Uptown Mall also has its own VIP Lounge.

Outside the mall is a Las Vegas-inspired dancing fountain which also features pyrotechnics.

==== Links ====
Uptown Mall's second level is connected to Uptown Parade through the Uptown Parade Bridge. The mall is interconnected with One Uptown Residences through the underground Uptown Mall Link.

=== Uptown Parade ===
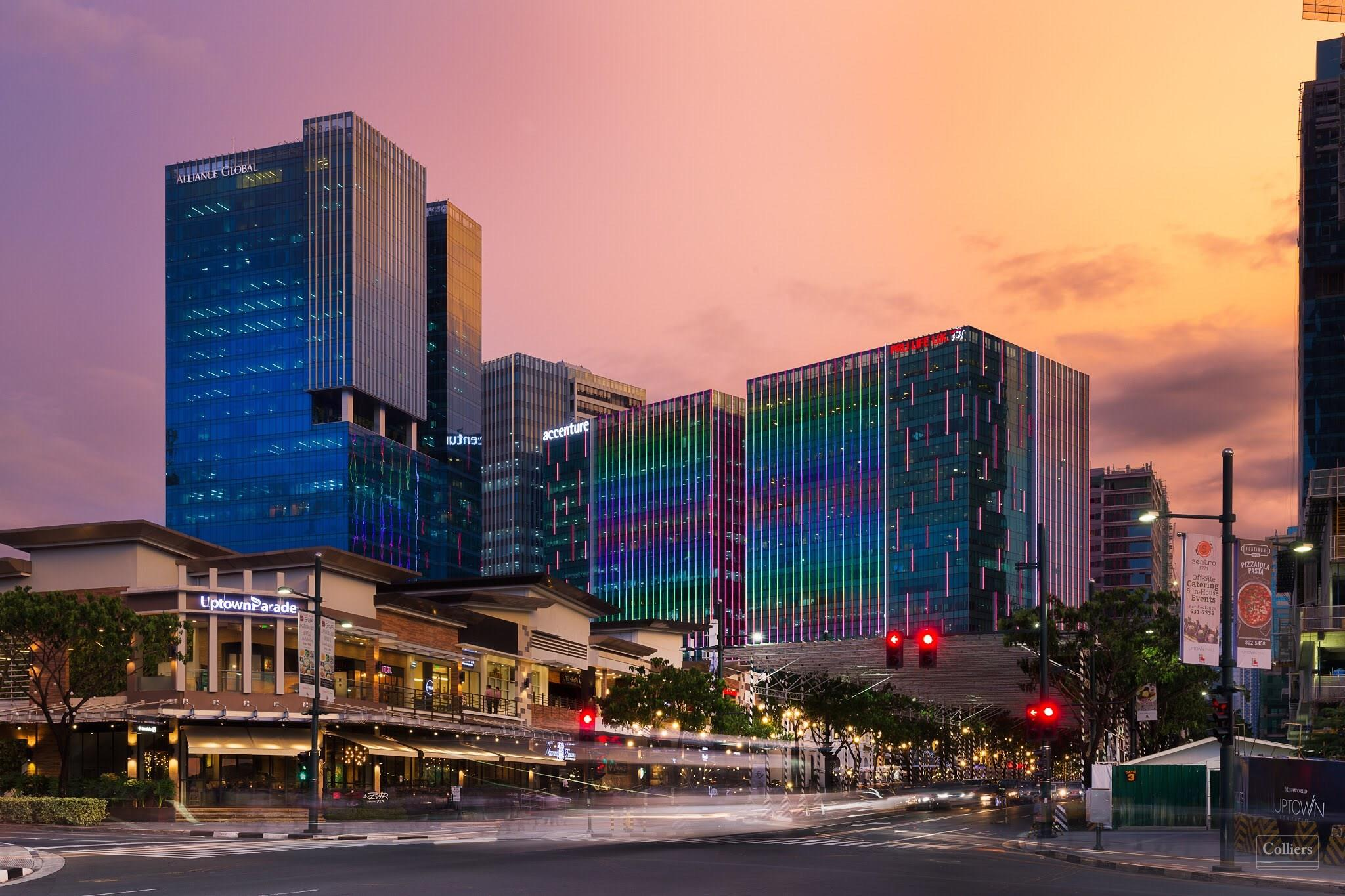
Uptown Place Towers (back) and Uptown Parade (foreground)

Uptown Parade is a two-level commercial strip across Uptown Mall. This 12,375-square-meter (133,200 sq ft) mall is primarily has restaurants and other food outlets as its tenants.

==== The Palace Manila ====
The Palace Manila is a collective group that hosts various bars and nightclubs within Uptown Parade. It was launched in 2014 by a group of nightlife entrepreneurs led by Embassy Superclub/Encore owner Erik Cua and his business partners including Tim Yap, Raymond Gutierrez and Erwan Heussaff among others, after consolidating most of its clubs including Republiq and Opus in Newport City (Pasay) and Privé Luxury Club back at The Fort Strip.

Valkyrie was The Palace's first nightclub. As of 2026, there are current nightclub sites operating: Revel, Yes Please, Clubhouse, and Medusa. XYLO, which took over Valkyrie's site in 2018, was closed in January 2026. The Palace also hosts The Island, an outdoor tropical day-and-night club.

=== Residences and office ===
The Uptown Mall serves as the podium of the Uptown Place Towers (formerly Uptown Corporate Center), a complex comprising four office buildings. The mall is also adjacent to residential condominiums such as One Uptown Residence, Uptown Ritz, Uptown Parksuites, and Uptown Arts Residence.

== Incidents ==
- March 29, 2022: A fire broke out at the non-operational Cinema 3 at 11:59 a.m. PHT, destroying the cinema chairs and projection room. It was declared under control at 1:37 p.m. and extinguished at 2 p.m.
- December 12, 2022: A Christmas tree on the mall's fourth level caught fire at 4:56 p.m. The fire was extinguished 23 minutes later.
- May 24, 2023: A ceiling collapse at the mall led to flooding, with water cascading from the second level, leaving the mall partially submerged.
