= Apartel (band) =

Filipino soul/R&B supergroup

- Origin: Metro Manila, Philippines
- Genres: Soul; R&B; funk; jazz
- Years active: 2016–present
- Labels: Offshore Music; Sony Music Philippines
- Spinoff of: Eraserheads; Gnash; DRT; Oh, Flamingo!
- Members: Ely Buendia; Redge Concepcion; Jun Lazo; Pat Sarabia; Deej Rodriguez; (Additional members)

Apartel are a Filipino soul and R&B supergroup. They currently consist of vocalist Ely Buendia, guitarist Redge Concepcion, bassist Jun Lazo, drummer Pat Sarabia, percussionist Deej Rodriguez, and a changing lineup of touring members.

Formed in 2016 by Buendia and Gnash and DRT frontman Jay Ortega, the band released their debut album Inner Play in 2016, followed by Full Flood in 2018.

== History ==
=== 2016–2017: Formation and Inner Play ===
Buendia and Ortega formed Apartel in early 2016. Buendia had wanted to incorporate a big band sound to his live repertoire, adding a horn section to his recent solo concert to reinterpret Eraserheads songs with the big band sound. “I wanted to put a twist on the old songs,” he explained. “I finally was able to afford these musicians like the horn players. I’m pretty proud of the production because there’s nothing like it in the mainstream. And I’m proud of the arrangements of the old songs.” Many of the band members had listened to soul music at their early age from artists such as Earth, Wind & Fire, Stevie Wonder, Michael Jackson, and VST & Company.

The band released their debut album Inner Play through Buendia's record label Offshore Music in July. It featured the lead single “Is It Hip?”, with a music video directed by Marie Jamora that premiered in September. The video was nominated for Best Music Video at the 2017 MYX Music Awards. The album was later released on vinyl in November.

In January 2017, the band announced that Ortega had left the group to focus on his solo career. The band released their second single “Sala sa Init” in April, with a giallo-inspired music video directed by drummer Pat Sarabia and Buendia's partner Audry Dionisio. They also directed the music video for the third single “Guijo St. (Makes You Wonder)”, released in November.

An EP featuring remixes of songs from Inner Play by Tandem 91, Tarsius, BP Valenzuela, Lustbass, and Couchlab was released to streaming services in November 2017. It was previously released as the second disc of the album's deluxe CD version.

=== 2018–present: Full Flood ===
The band released the first single from their second album Full Flood, “Pateros”, in June 2018.

Offshore Music released Full Flood in October 2018. Mastered by Bernie Grundman, it was later released on limited edition vinyl in June 2020. A music video for the album's second single "Sisid" was premiered the following month.

The band released a live performance video for “Pre-Loved” featuring Zia Quizon in October 2020.

== Members ==
=== Current members ===
- Ely Buendia – vocals, bass guitar (2016–present)
- Redge Concepcion – guitars (2016–present)
- Jun Lazo – bass (2016–present)
- Pat Sarabia – drums, percussion (2016–present), backing vocals (2017–2022)
- Deej Rodriguez – percussion (2016–present)

=== Additional musicians ===
- Brass Pas Pas Pas Pas – horns
  - Wendell Garcia – drums, percussion, backing vocals (2016–present)
  - Wowee Ansano – trumpet (2016–2020)
  - Pards Tupas – trombone (2016–2020)
  - Roxy Modesto – saxophone (2016)
- Nitoy Adriano – guitars (2016–present)
- Donna Sagun Señoran – harp, back-up vocals (2016–present)
- Joseph Cabañero – saxophone (2016–present)
- Diane Sagun – back-up vocals (2016–present)
- Roderick Camarce – trumpet (2016)
- Niño Hernandez – flute (2016)
- Audry Dionisio – rhythm guitar, synthesizer, backing vocals (2017–present)
- Dok Sergio – bass guitar, backing vocals (2022–present)
- Moon Carlo – drums, percussion (2023–present)
- Louie Talan – bass (2016)
- Buddy Zabala – bass (2016)
- Jan Ortega Roy – bass (2016)
- Cookie Chua – backup vocals (2016)
- Miguel Hernandez – percussion (2016)
- Ramonne Rodriguez – live backup singer (2016)

=== Past members ===
- Jay Ortega – vocals (2016–2017)
- RJ Pineda – vocals, keyboards (2016–2017)
- Coco Coo – guitars (2016–2018)
- Telay Robles – backing vocals (2016–2020)
- Lily Munoz – backing vocals (2016–2020)
- Marge Rubiano – backing vocals (2016–2020)
- Mayo Baluyut – bass guitar, electric guitar, vocals (2016–2017)
- Ryan Goan – keyboards, piano, backing vocals (2016–2020)
- Carissa Ramos – bass guitar, backing vocals (2016–2024)

== Discography ==
=== Studio albums ===
Title	Album details
Inner Play	Released: July 10, 2016; Label: Offshore Music; Format: LP, CD, download, streaming
Full Flood	Released: October 3, 2018; Label: Offshore Music; Format: LP, CD, download, streaming

=== Remix albums ===
- Inner Play (Remixes) (2017)

=== Singles ===
List of singles, showing year released and album name
Title	Year	Album
"Is It Hip?"	2016	Inner Play
"Sala sa Init"	2017	Inner Play
"Guijo St. (Makes You Wonder)"	2017	Inner Play
"Better off (Tandems 91 Remix)"	2018	Inner Play (Remixes)
"Pateros"	2018	Full Flood
"Sisid"	2018	Full Flood
"Pre-Loved" (Zia Quizon and Apartel)	2020	Full Flood

=== Other appearances ===
Title	Year	Album
"Isa Na Lang"	2018	Offshore Music Vol. 1
"Can I Be So High?"	2019	Offshore Music Vol. 2
"Mahiwaga"	2019	Offshore Music Vol. 2
"Pre-Loved” (Ukay version)	2024	Dimensions (vinyl edition bonus track)

=== Music videos ===
Year	Title	Director
2016	"Is It Hip?"	Marie Jamora
2017	"Sala sa Init"	Audry Dionisio and Pat Sarabia
2017	"Guijo St. (Makes You Wonder)"	Audry Dionisio and Pat Sarabia
2018	"Pateros"	
2018	"Sisid"	
2020	"Pre-Loved" (Zia Quizon and Apartel)	
2024	”Pre-Loved” (Ukay version)	KNYA Collective

== Awards and nominations ==
Year	Award-giving body	Category	Nominated work	Results
2017	2017 MYX Music Awards	Best Music Video	"Is It Hip?" Director: Marie Jamora	Nominated
