= Manila (song) =

Single by Hotdog

from the album Inspiration: Everybody Needs One
- B-side: "Ako'y Hindi Angel"
- Released: 1976
- Studio: Sampaguita Recording Studio
- Genre: Manila sound
- Label: RCA Victor
- Composer: Rene Garcia
- Lyricist: Dennis Garcia
- Producer: Dennis Garcia

"Manila" is a song by Filipino band Hotdog. The song is written about love for the Philippines, most specifically its capital, and tells about a man who misses his home country while living in another country for years. The upbeat song was inspired by Tony Bennett's hit single, "I Left My Heart in San Francisco". It topped the radio charts in 1976.

The song was used as the entrance of the Philippine delegates during the Parade of Nations on the opening ceremony of 2019 Southeast Asian Games held at the Philippine Arena in November 30, 2019.

== Background ==
=== Plot ===
The song centers on the story of an unnamed protagonist who left the Philippines for a foreign country to work and became homesick after living out for long, while also narrating of his many adventures outside the country and his eventual return to the Philippines.

In the beginning, the protagonist tells of a time he left the Philippines and its capital, Manila, to work in a foreign country in hopes of finding greener pastures, stating that he will never forget the place he came from but promises that he will eventually return someday. This process repeats itself during the times he left and returned to the country.

The lyrics are mostly a mix of literal and metaphorical meanings. "I walked the streets of San Francisco" tells of the protagonist's daily life overseas while "I've tried the rides in Disneyland" alludes to his love of visiting tourist spots and places of interest in his adopted homeland and other countries, which includes but not limited to natural spots, amusement and theme parks, and other places popular to tourists, Disneyland being one of them. He eventually makes a lasting friendship with foreigners and different nationalities including his fellow overseas Filipinos ("dated a million girls in Sydney"), but states that although he has experienced the attractions, social life, and offerings of other places as part of his love for overseas life and that he had gained the satisfaction he wanted, he felt the need for more and what he had wasn't enough ("somehow I feel that I don't belong").

The protagonist eventually realizes that the Philippines can only give him the best everlasting satisfaction and enjoyment, which starts in "Hinahanap-hanap kita Manila", stating that he misses the country's atmosphere and lifestyle as well as its culture and people ("ang ingay mong kay-sarap sa tenga, mga jeepney mong nagliliparan, mga babaeng mong nag-gagandahan") before expressing his desire to return to the Philippines and its capital for good ("Take me back in your arms Manila, Promise me you'll never let go", "miss you like hell Manila"). He then makes his decision to come home to his native country and settle down through the final lyrics "no place in the world like Manila, I'm coming home to stay".

=== Composition ===
In the 70's, during the Martial Law era, the Manila sound genre was getting to a successful peak. That was when the Hotdogs formed with Ella Del Rosario as lead vocals, Rene Garcia on vocals/lead guitarist, Ramon "Mon" Torralba as 2nd lead guitarist, Tito Del Rosario on 3rd lead guitar, Dennis Garcia on bass guitar, Lorrie Ilustre on keyboards with Jess Garcia and Roy Diaz de Rivera as drummers and backing vocalists.

After hearing Tony Bennett's hit single, "I Left My Heart in San Francisco" and Frank Sinatra's "New York, New York" on radio during one of their daily routines, Garcia brothers, Rene and Dennis, found out that the Philippine capital, Manila should have a song of its own.

Dennis Garcia, Hotdog’s original bassist and main songwriter, has said in an interview that "the band considers the song as “the mother of all Hotdog hits.” He added saying that he and his brother Rene "felt our favorite city should also have an anthem of its own, a tune that will last forever. Looks like we got ourselves a self-fulfilling wish”.

== Cover versions ==
Ever since Hotdog reunited and disbanded, the song has been covered by various artists like Gary Valenciano, Eraserheads, Side A, The CompanY, and REO Brothers.

Side A gave the song a groovier sound and more of a soft rock ballad theme. This was included on their 1998 album "Ang Ating Awitin" made during the celebration of the Centennial Philippine Independence. The REO Brothers gave a more "Beatles" sound to their cover of the song, which was released as part of a fundraising campaign for victims of the 2013 Typhoon Haiyan.

== Side notes ==
There is a possibility that this song was also inspired by Tayo Na Sa Antipolo, recorded by the Mabuhay Singers in their album Maligayang Araw, under the title Antipolo.

Contrary to suggestions that the song was inspired by the Mabuhay Singers’ Tayo Na sa Antipolo, Dennis Garcia (founding member of the Hotdogs) said that he had no idea how that story came about as “the song is 100 percent original and organic—borrowing from zero influences.”

== See also ==
- List of songs about Manila
