= Offshore Music =

Filipino independent record label

Offshore Music Philippines
- Founded: 2016
- Founder: Ely Buendia
- Distributor: Sony Music Philippines
- Genre: Various
- Country of origin: Philippines
- Location: Metro Manila, Philippines
- Official website: www.offshoremusicph.com

Offshore Music Philippines is an independent record label founded by Ely Buendia (of Eraserheads) in 2016. Offshore Music entered into a distribution agreement with Sony Music Philippines in 2023.

== History ==
Buendia formed Offshore Music in 2016. He has also taken on sound engineer and executive producer roles in its subsequent releases, with the label's artists being able to record in Buendia's home recording studio Crow's Nest. Offshore's first releases were Buendia's soul and R&B supergroup Apartel’s debut album Inner Play (2016) and his collaborations with Itchyworms, "Pariwara" and "Lutang", which were released as a 7-inch single for Record Store Day in 2017.

After briefly running out of funds, the label relaunched in 2018. “We don’t sign up every band we see. We pick the ones that we believe in, and whose music we like," Buendia said in a press release. "We don’t sign anyone we know we couldn’t support, as we have very little resources, and have a very small budget to work with.”

In August 2023, the label signed a partnership agreement with Sony Music Philippines, which includes global distribution, promotion of artists, and securing brand partnerships. They also signed ten acts to their roster later in October.

The label has rereleased Eraserheads's first three albums and their 2014 singles "Sabado" and "1995" on vinyl. General Manager Audry Dionisio has stated that the label prioritizes releasing its catalogue on vinyl. "It's a very tactile medium that adds to the experience of the consumption of music," she said.

== Artists signed to Offshore Music ==
=== Current ===
- ALYSON
- Amateurish
- Apartel
- Aviators
- Bree
- Carousel Casualties
- CRISHA
- Diego's Scenes
- Eliza Marie
- Elton Clark
- Ely Buendia
- Ena Mori
- Experience
- FOW
- GundamFunk Aviators
- Halina
- Her Name Is Noelle
- JDRX
- JR Oca Experience
- Juicebox
- Ligaya Escueta
- Marion Talavera
- M1ss Jade So
- MI MI
- Mt. Lewis
- neytan
- Paco Pastor
- Pamphleteer
- Pinkmen
- Sansette
- Pixie Labrador
- Savannah
- Sexy Jay
- Seedy and the Years
- Sulo
- Shades of Native
- Stef Aranas
- Tinay
- The Fixtion
- Velvet Howl

=== Catalog Offshore Music artists ===
- Eraserheads

=== Former ===
- Eyedress
- Itchyworms
- The Late Isabel
- Jun Lopito
- One Click Straight
- The Ransom Collective
