= Hotdog (band) =

Filipino band

- Origin: Manila, Philippines
- Genres: Manila sound; pop; disco; funk; OPM
- Years active: 1972–mid-1980s; 2000–2018
- Past members: Ramon "Mon" Torralba; Tito del Rosario; Dennis Garcia; Roy Diaz de Rivera; Lorrie Ilustre; Jess Garcia; Rene Enriquez; Gavin Zerby; Odette Quesada; Andy Caberte; Zsazsa Padilla; Maso Diez; Gina Montes; Rita Trinidad; Joy Reyes; Nadia Moore; Elaine Evangelista; Jun Alañon, Mon Alañon; Milla Poblete; Arthur Ritona; Tony Cortez

Hotdog was a Filipino band formed by brothers Dennis and Rene Garcia that achieved fame in the Philippines during the mid-1970s. Their first album, Unang Kagat, was released in 1974 by Villar Records. The album led to the 1978 movie of the same name, also starring the band. The band was credited by local journalists as a major influence on and leading exponent of the Manila Sound, a musical genre popular during that period.

Hotdog officially dissolved upon the death of its co-founder and bass guitarist, Dennis Garcia, in January 2020.

== History ==
The original band members included Dennis Garcia, Lorrie Ilustre, Rene Garcia, and Ramon Torralba, who were buddies at La Salle Green Hills. The brothers Dennis and Rene Garcia were members of Redfox, a mainstay band which performed at Third Eye in Manila. They eventually formed the new band which they named Hotdog and invited Ella del Rosario of Assumption Convent as their female solo vocalist.

At a time when Filipino music was hardly favored and practically in limbo, the band springboarded Filipino music and started a revolution that we know today as Original Pinoy Music. It was during the '70s that the local music industry was topped by foreign music playing disco and funk sounds. Most local artists would imitate these foreign tunes in the hopes of becoming visible. However, when Ella del Rosario, Dennis Garcia, Rene Garcia, Ramon Torralba (who composed the mega hit song "Pers Lab"), Lorrie Ilustre, Jess Garcia and Roy Diaz de Rivera first came together, the music landscape in the Philippines completely changed.

The band was instrumental in creating the "Manila Sound" genre, one of the first purely Pinoy music generas.

It was because of the Manila Sound, pioneered by the band, that Filipino music flourished from the mid-1970s onward. Many of the band's and Ella del Rosario's singles became hits and received gold and platinum status.

Amidst the success and fame that the band was garnering, Hotdog disbanded in the mid-'80s because the members wanted to pursue individual interests. Former vocalist Rita Trinidad is an entrepreneur, while Rene Garcia co-founded Bandang Pinoy Co-Op, an organization that helps aging and retired musicians develop new skills and find employment.

The band reunited (without three original members del Rosario, Ilustre and Torralba) sometime in 2000 to perform various gigs. On June 17, 2014, the band held a benefit concert for the Tacloban victims of Typhoon Haiyan (Typhoon Yolanda).

Lead vocalist Rene Garcia died on September 2, 2018. Dennis Garcia died on January 18, 2020.

== Legacy ==
One of the band's biggest hits is the song "Bongga Ka, 'Day" (1979). With the song was an eponymous motion picture released, starring renowned actors including Nora Aunor, Vilma Santos, Joseph Estrada, Fernando Poe Jr. and Boots Anson-Roa. Another one of their hit songs, "Annie Batungbakal", also produced a popular and successful movie of the same name.

The hits of Hotdog also sang of relevant social issues. "Manila" was a song dedicated to the millions of Overseas Filipino Workers (OFWs) who are away from their families and long for the taste of not just their home city, Manila, but also the entire Philippines.

== Discography ==
- Unang Kagat (1974)
- Pakagat Pa Nga! (1975)
- Inspiration: Everybody Needs One (1976)
- Jumbo (1976)
- Annie Batungbakal (1979)
- Laking Maynila (1979)
- 100% Pure Meat (1988)
- Di Mo Pansin (1991)
- Hotdogs Greatest Hits (1993; repackaged later as a digitally remastered in 2003

== Songs ==
- "Panaginip" - dreaming of a loved one
- "Annie Batungbakal" - about a disco queen from "Frisco" (San Francisco del Monte, Quezon City) and her addiction to partying (also covered by Jolina Magdangal-Escueta & Toni Gonzaga-Soriano)
- "Beh, Buti Nga" - getting even with a past crush who never knew you existed. (also covered by Parokya ni Edgar & Mark Bautista).
- "Bitin Sa 'Yo" - about a lover who never felt loved 'in public'. Another Ella and Rene duet hit.
- "Bongga Ka, 'Day" - a tribute to a 'fashionista'
- "Can't Forget You" - English love song with Zsa Zsa Padilla
- "Dying to Tell You" - about not being able to express one's feelings
- "Ikaw ang Miss Universe ng Buhay Ko" - a serenade to all beautiful Filipina women, Hotdog's inaugural 1974 hit duetted by Rene Garcia and Ella del Rosario (also covered by Andrew E., True Faith, Blaster Salonga Feat. former Sugarfree Frontman Ebe Dancel)
- "Ikaw Pa Rin" - after so many loves, only one love matters
- "Kasi Naman" - even after all the fights, you're still in love. Music composition by Ella del Rosario (also covered by Nikki Gil-Albert
- "Langit Na Naman" - tells that it's like heaven when you see, smell or be with someone you love (also covered by Donna Cruz, Daniel Padilla, Barbies Cradle, Sam Milby)
- "Manila" - an ode to the Philippines' famous capital (also covered by Eraserheads, Side A, REO Brothers, RJ Jacinto With The Late Original Hotdog Band Member Dennis Garcia, Jason Dhakal, Gary V.)
- "O, Lumapit Ka" - Ella del Rosario's solo signature seductive tune, her first mega-hit under her solo career and OctoArts' Canary Label, not under the Hotdog band. The song is a cover of “Só Em Teus Braços”, a bossa nova song first released by João Gilberto in 1960. Although both songs share the same melody, the lyrical contents are different. “Só Em Teus Braços”, which translates to “Only in Your Arms”, is about a man who romantically expresses that even though he had plans and dreams to pursue, only in his lover's arms can he find happiness. Whereas, “O, Lumapit Ka”, (Oh, Come Closer) is a song about a woman flirting with another man to dance with her. The way the song is sung by Ella Del Rosario suggests a sexual seductive tone. (also parody covered by TVJ)
- "Pers Lab" - loving from a distance, Hotdog's first mega-platinum hit under Villar Records sung and popularized by Ella del Rosario in 1974. Many covers of this song have emerged since, but none has matched the number of records sold of the original version. (Also covered by Vina Morales, Fil Brit Singer Charlie Green, Rita Daniela, Barbie Forteza, Rivermaya, Sarah Geronimo-Guidicellli & After 5)

== Covers ==
- The most covered Hotdog song is "Manila", including versions by Gary V., the Eraserheads & Side A, and a duet by Rene Garcia and Ramon Jacinto.
- Parokya ni Edgar & Mark Bautista were both covered and did their own version of "Beh, Buti Nga!"
- Sarah Geronimo also covered her version of "Pers Lab".
- Color It Red, The Akafellas and a duet with Rene Garcia and RJ Jacinto covered the song "Bongga Ka, 'Day".
- Nikki Gil recorded her version of a song composed by Ella del Rosario, "Kasi Naman".
- True Faith also recorded and did a cover version of "Ikaw Ang Miss Universe Ng Buhay Ko".
- Barbie's Cradle, Daniel Padilla and Donna Cruz also covered "Langit Na Naman".
- English-Filipino singer Charlie Green also covered "Pers Lab", making it his first Tagalog song.
