= Myx Music Awards 2010 =

Annual Philippine music awards ceremony

- Date: March 2, 2010
- Location: Music Museum, San Juan
- Hosted by: Myx video jockeys
- Most wins: Sarah Geronimo (4)
- Most nominations: Gloc-9, Rico Blanco, and Chicosci (6)

Television/radio coverage
- Network: Myx
- Produced by: Myx

Myx Music Awards 2010 was the 5th Myx Music Awards, an annual music awards ceremony established in 2006. Hosted by Myx video jockeys, it was broadcast on Myx and Studio 23. The nominees were announced on February 1, 2010, followed by the awards ceremony on March 2.

== Nomination night ==
Nomination night took place on February 1, 2010 at Eastwood Central Plaza, Quezon City, hosted by VJs Robi, Janine, Nel, Bianca, Chino, and Janine, Yael of Sponge Cola, Letter Day Story, 6cyclemind, Gloc-9, Champ of Hale, and Chicosci. With six nominations each, Gloc-9 (for Favorite Music Video, Favorite Male Artist, Favorite Urban Video, Favorite Collaboration, Favorite Remake, Favorite Myx Live! Performance), Rico Blanco (Favorite Music Video, Favorite Song, Favorite Artist, Favorite Male Artist, Favorite Rock Video, Favorite Myx Live! Performance) and Chicosci (Favorite Music Video, Favorite Song, Favorite Artist, Favorite Group, Favorite Rock Video, Favorite Myx Celebrity VJ) got the most number of nominations.

== Hosts ==
- Iya Villania
- Luis Manzano
- Nikki Gil

== Presenters ==
The awards were presented by Paolo Valenciano, Robin Nievera, Carl Guevarra, Lauren Young, Mong Alcaraz of Chicosci, Bangs Garcia, Jett Pangan, Daiana Menezes, Mickey Perz, Amber Davis, Rafael Rosell, April "Congrats" Gustilo, Mark Escueta of Rivermaya, Jolina Magdangal, Matteo Guidicelli, Saab Magalona, Aiza Seguerra, Sitti, Amir Garcia of Slapshock, Kyla, Richard Poon, Tim Yap, Jennylyn Mercado, Rhian Ramos, Ryan Eigenmann, Billy Crawford, Noel Cabangon, Aia de Leon of Imago, and Donita Rose.

== Performers ==
The ceremony featured performances from Aldred Gatchalian, Sam Concepcion, Kaye Miranda, Cheska Ortega, Gian Magdangal, Karylle, Nina, La Divas, Rayver Cruz, and Iya Villania, who performed a medley of songs nominated for Favorite Song. Knowa Lazarus, Kenjohns, Chelo Aestrid, and DJ Flavamatikz performed "Mainit," a Favorite Urban Video nominee.

A medley of Jose Mari Chan's songs was performed by Jay-R, Richard Poon, Yeng Constantino, Jayson Fernandez of Rivermaya, Rachel Ann Go, Kean Cipriano of Callalily, and Christian Bautista in celebration of Chan's receipt of the Myx Magna Award. Urbandub, joined by Aia de Leon of Imago, Kat Agarrado of Sinosikat, and Paolo Valenciano of Salamin, also performed during the ceremony.

Hilera performed "Radical," followed by an appearance by Rico Blanco, who joined the band for a performance of his song "Ayuz" and participated in a dance break.

== Winners and nominees ==
Winners are listed first and highlighted in boldface.

Favorite Music Video	Favorite Song
**"Kasalanan" – 6cyclemind & Gloc9**; "Antukin" – Rico Blanco; "Bahay Kubo" – Hale; "Diamond Shotgun" – Chicosci; "Radical" – Hilera	**"Back In Time" – Kyla & Jay-R**; "Antukin" – Rico Blanco; "Di Na Mababawi" – Sponge Cola; "Diamond Shotgun" – Chicosci; "Simulan Mo Na" – Pedicab
Favorite Artist	Favorite Female Artist
**Sarah Geronimo**; Chicosci; Christian Bautista; Rico Blanco; Sponge Cola	**Sarah Geronimo**; Charice; Karylle; Kyla; Yeng Constantino
Favorite Male Artist	Favorite Group
**Rico Blanco**; Billy Crawford; Christian Bautista; Gloc9; Richard Poon	**Sponge Cola**; 6cyclemind; Chicosci; Hale; Pedicab
Favorite Mellow Video	Favorite Rock Video
**"Old Friend" – Kyla**; "And I Love You So" – Regine Velasquez; "Tell Me Your Name" – Christian Bautista; "This Time I’ll Be Sweeter" – Rachelle Ann Go; "You And I" – Richard Poon	**"Diamond Shotgun" – Chicosci**; "Antukin" – Rico Blanco; "Radical" – Hilera; "Simulan Mo Na" – Pedicab; "Wala" – Kamikazee
Favorite Urban Video	Favorite New Artist
**"Upuan" – Gloc9 feat. Jeazelle Grutas**; "Katulad Ko" – D-Coy feat. Luke Mejares & Artstrong; "Mainit" – Knowa Lazarus, Kenjhons & Chelo Aestrid with DJ Flavamatikz; "Rendezvous" – Dice & K9 Mobbstarr; "That Girl" – Young JV	**Young JV**; Archipelago; Duster; Letter Day Story; Peryodiko
Favorite Indie Artist	Favorite Collaboration
**Archipelago**; Angulo; April Morning Skies; Ciudad; Us-2 Evil-0	**"Higante" – Francis M & Ely Buendia**; "Ayt!" – Sponge Cola & Gary Valenciano; "Back In Time" – Kyla & Jay-R; "Kasalanan" – 6cyclemind & Gloc9; "Tabi" – Paraluman & Kean Cipriano
Favorite Remake	Favorite Media Soundtrack
**"You Changed My Life" – Sarah Geronimo**; "Balita" – Gloc9 feat. Gabby Alipe; "Heart To Heart" – Kyla; "Human Nature" – Billy Crawford; "Tell Me Your Name" – Christian Bautista	**"Record Breaker" – Sarah Geronimo**; "Best About Life" – SinoSikat; "Tayong Dalawa" – Gary Valenciano; "Whisper I Love You" – Kim Chiu & Gerald Anderson; "You Changed My Life" – Sarah Geronimo
Favorite Guest Appearance in a Music Video	Favorite Myx Celebrity VJ
**Heart Evangelista ("Bahay Kubo" – Hale)**; Cristine Reyes ("Ayuz" – Rico Blanco); Jake Cuenca ("Neon Brights" – Taken by Cars); John Lloyd Cruz ("You Changed My Life" – Sarah Geronimo); Saab Magalona ("Diamond Shotgun" – Chicosci)	**Billy Crawford**; Chicosci; Kamikazee; Martin Nievera & Gary Valenciano; Rhian Ramos
Favorite Myx Live! Performance	Favorite Myx Bandarito Performance
**Rico Blanco**; Gloc9; Kamikazee; Richard Poon; Zsa Zsa Padilla	**Roots of Nature**; Bembol Rockers; Blue Boy Bites Back; Intolerant; The Lowtechs
Favorite International Video	Special Citation
**"Love Story" – Taylor Swift**; "Fire" – 2NE1; "Nobody" – Wonder Girls; "One Time" – Justin Bieber; "The Climb" – Miley Cyrus	**Christian Bautista**
Myx Magna Award
**Jose Mari Chan**
