= 6th PMPC Star Awards for Music =

- Date: September 14, 2014
- Venue: Solaire Resort & Casino, Parañaque
- Hosted by: Christian Bautista; Maja Salvador; Jake Cuenca

The 6th PMPC Star Awards for Music by the Philippine Movie Press Club (PMPC), honored the best Filipino music of 2013. The ceremony took place on September 14, 2014, at Solaire Resort & Casino in Parañaque.

The PMPC Star Awards for Music was hosted by Christian Bautista, Maja Salvador and Jake Cuenca.

== Winners and nominees ==
The following are the nominations for the 6th PMPC Star Awards for Music, covering music released in 2013.

Winners are listed first and indicated in bold.

=== Major categories ===
Album of the Year	Song of the Year
**"Liham at Lihim" – Gloc-9 (Universal Records)**; "Expressions" – Sarah Geronimo (Viva Records); "Hulog Ka ng Langit" – Regine Velasquez (Universal Records); "With You" – Gary Valenciano (Universal Records); "Jonalyn Viray" – Jonalyn Viray (Creative Media Entertainment); "Ultrablessed" – Sponge Cola (Universal Records); "Spread The Love" – Kris Lawrence (GMA Records)	**"Help Me Get Over" – Jonalyn Viray (Creative Media Entertainment)**; **Tata Betita, composer**; "Magda" – Gloc-9 (Universal Records); Gloc-9, composer; "Lord Patawad" – Bassilyo (MCA Music); Bassilyo & Emman D' Great Mixed, composers; "Ikot" – Sarah Geronimo (Viva Records); Thyro Alfaro & Pow Chavez, composers; "Gayuma" – Abra (Ivory Music); Raymond Abracosa, composer; "Nag-iisa" – Angeline Quinto (Star Music); Angeline Quinto and Jonathan Manalo, composers; "Ikaw Pala" – Kris Lawrence (GMA Records); Vehnee Saturno, composer
Male Recording Artist of the Year	Female Recording Artist of the Year
**Gary Valenciano – "With Love, Gary Valenciano" (Universal Records)**; Daniel Padilla – "I Heart You" (Star Music); Gloc 9 – "Liham at Lihim" (Universal Records); Vice Ganda – "Vice Ganda" (Star Music); Kris Lawrence – "Spread The Love" (GMA Records); Raymond Lauchengco – "The Promise" (Viva Records); Chad Borja – "Show Me the Way" (Warner Music Philippines)	**Sarah Geronimo – Expressions (Viva Records)**; Angeline Quinto – "Higher Love" (Star Music); Juris – "Dreaming of You" (S2S); Regine Velasquez – "Hulog Ka ng Langit" (Universal Records); Lani Misalucha – "The Nightingale Returns" (Star Music); Charice – "Chapter 10" (Star Music); Jonalyn Viray – "Jonalyn Viray" (Creative Media Entertainment)
New Male Recording Artist of the Year	New Female Recording Artist of the Year
**Herbert C – "Kinabukasan" (Ivory Music); and**; **Richard Yap – "Richard Yap" (Star Music) (tied)**; Abra – "Abra" (Ivory Music); Bassilyo – "Klasik" (MCA Music); Michael Pangilinan – "Michael Pangilinan" (Star Music); Alden Richards – "Alden Richards" (Universal Records); James Wright – "James Wright" (GMA Records); Renzo Vergara – "Renzo Vergara" (Star Music)	**Marion Aunor – "Marion Aunor" (Star Music)**; Janice Javier – "Janice Javier" (Universal Records); KZ Tandingan – "KZ Tandingan" (Star Music); Maja Salvador – "Believe" (Ivory Music); Barbie Forteza – "Barbie Forteza" (Universal Records)
Duo/Group of the Year	Music Video of the Year
**The Angelos – "From Our Hearts" (Star Music)**; Sponge Cola – "Ultrablessed" (Universal Records); Parokya ni Edgar – "Bente" (Universal Records); Rocksteddy – "Instadramatic" (12 Stone Records); 1:43 – "Kalye Pop" (Universal Records); Top Suzara and Jinky Vidal – "Reunited" (Viva Records); Tom Rodriguez and Dennis Trillo – "TomDen" (GMA Records)	**"The Prayer" – The Loboc Children Choir and Various artists (Star Music)**; **Paolo Abella, director**; "Papel" – Joey Ayala (Universal Records); Jaime Pacena II, director; "Magda" – Gloc-9 (Universal Records); Jaime Pacena II, director; "Ilusyon" – Abra (Ivory Music); Raymond Abracosa, director; "Ikot" – Sarah Geronimo (Viva Records); Paul Basinillo and Sarah Geronimo, directors; "Forever" – Tom Rodriguez and Dennis Trillo (GMA Records); Milos Curameng, director; "Tatanggapin Ba Kita" – DK Valdez (BWB Records); DK Valdez, director

=== Pop category ===
Pop Album of the Year	Male Pop Artist of the Year
**"Expressions" – Sarah Geronimo (Viva Records)**; "Higher Love" – Angeline Quinto (Star Music); "Dreaming of You" – Juris (S2S); "With You" – Gary Valenciano (Universal Records); "The Nightingale Returns" – Lani Misalucha (Star Music); "Palagi" – Zsa Zsa Padilla – (PolyEast Records); "Show Me The Way" – Chad Borja (Warner Music Philippines)	**Daniel Padilla – "I Heart You" (Star Music)**; Gary Valenciano – "With You" (Universal Records); Sam Concepcion – (Universal Records); Xian Lim – "XL2" (Star Music); Raymond Lauchengco – "The Promise" (Viva Records); Chad Borja – "Show Me the Way" (Warner Music Philippines); Dennis Trillo – "TomDen" (GMA Records)
Female Pop Artist of the Year	
**Angeline Quinto – "Higher Love" (Star Music)**; Juris – "Dreaming of You" (S2S); Sarah Geronimo – Expressions (Viva Records); Regine Velasquez – "Hulog Ka ng Langit" (Universal Records); Lani Misalucha – "The Nightingale Returns" (Star Music); Jonalyn Viray – "Jonalyn Viray" (Creative Media Entertainment); Charice – "Chapter 10" (Star Music)	

=== Rock, Rap, RnB and Acoustic category ===
Rock Album of the Year	Rock Artist of the Year
**"Ultrablessed" – Sponge Cola (Universal Records)**; "Malaya" – Kitchie Nadal (12 Stone Records); "Instadramatic" – Rocksteddy (12 Stone Records); "Monodramatic" – Silent Sanctuary (Ivory Music); "Only in the Philippines" – Banda ni Kleggy (Universal Records); "KZ Tandingan" – KZ Tandingan (Star Music); "Esoteric" – Urbandub (Universal Records)	**Sponge Cola – Ultrablessed (Universal Records)**; Kitchie Nadal – "Malaya" (12 Stone Records); Rocksteddy – "Instadramatic" (12 Stone Records); Silent Sanctuary – "Monodramatic" (Ivory Music); Banda ni Kleggy – "Only in the Philippines" (Universal Records); Urbandub – "Esoteric" (Universal Records); KZ Tandingan – "KZ Tandingan" (Star Music)
RnB Album of the Year	RnB Artist of the Year
**"Spread the Love" – Kris Lawrence (GMA Records)**; "Janice Javier" – Janice Javier (Universal Records); "Reunited" – Top Suzara and Jinky Vidal (Viva Records); "Flaunt" – Duncan Ramos (PolyEast Records)	**Kris Lawrence – "Spread the Love" (GMA Records)**; Janice Javier – "Janice Javier" (Universal Records); Duncan Ramos – "Flaunt" (PolyEast Records); Top Suzara – "Reunited" (Viva Records); Jinky Vidal – "Reunited" (Viva Records)
Rap Album of the Year	Rap Artist of the Year
**"Liham at Lihim" – Gloc-9 (Universal Records)**; "Abra" – Abra (Ivory Music); "Klasik" – Bassilyo (Universal Records); "Wala Pang Titulo" – Ron Henley (Universal Records); "Ultrasound" – Loonie (Universal Records); "Last of a Dying Breed" – Blaze N Kane (Flipmusic Records); "Shehyee" – Shehyee (Flipmusic Records)	**Gloc-9 – "Liham at Lihim" (Universal Records)**; Abra – "Abra" / (Ivory Music); Bassilyo – "Klasik" (Universal Records); Ron Henley – "Wala Pang Titulo" (Universal Records); Loonie – "Ultrasound" (Universal Records); Blaze N Kane – "Last of a Dying Breed" (Flipmusic Records); Shehyee – "Shehyee" (Flipmusic Records)
Acoustic Album of the Year	Male Acoustic Artist of the Year
**Acoustic Noel – Noel Cabangon (Universal Records)**; "Samu't Sari" – Johnoy Danao (Universal Records); "OPM" – Princess Velasco (Viva Records); "I Love Acoustic 6" - Sabrina (Universal Records); "Yssa Muhlach" – Yssa Muhlach (Viva Records); "My Acoustic" – Myk Perez (MCA Music); "Bossa Love" – Sitti (MCA Music)	**Noel Cabangon – "Acoustic Noel" (Universal Records)**; Johnoy Danao – "Samu't Sari" (Universal Records); Myk Perez – "My Acoustic" (MCA Music); JM de Guzman – "Tensionado" (Ivory Music); TJ Monterde – "Ikaw at Ako" (PolyEast Records)
Female Acoustic Artist of the Year	
**Zia Quizon – "A Little Bit of Lovin'" (PolyEast Records)**; Princess Velasco – "OPM" (Viva Records); Sabrina – "I Love Acoustic 6" (Universal Records); Yssa Muhlach – "Yssa Muhlach" (Viva Records); Sitti – "Bossa Love" (MCA Music)	

=== Novelty category ===
Novelty Album of the Year	Novelty Song of the Year
**"Eat Bulaga! Dabarkads D'Album (A Party for Every Juan)" – Various artists (Ivory Music)**; "Vice Ganda" – Vice Ganda (Star Music); "Pare, Pa-Kiss!" – Guadings (Viva Records)	**"Manhid Ka" – Vice Ganda (Star Music)**; "Karakaraka" – Vice Ganda (Star Music); "Cha-cha Dabarkads" – Jose Manalo, Wally Bayola and Ryzza Mae Dizon (Ivory Music); "Jump Brother" – Jose Manalo and Wally Bayola (Ivory Records); "Guapapa" – Guadings (Viva Records)
Novelty Artist of the Year	
**Vice Ganda – "Vice Ganda" (Star Music)**; Jose Manalo and Wally Bayola – "Eat Bulaga! Dabarkads D'Album (A Party for Every Juan)" (Ivory Music); Ryzza Mae Dizon – Eat Bulaga! Dabarkads D'Album (A Party for Every Juan) (Ivory Music); Guadings – "Pare, Pa-Kiss!" (Viva Records)

=== Album category ===
Dance Album of the Year	Revival Album of the Year
**"Believe" – Maja Salvador (Ivory Music)**; "Infinite" – Sam Concepcion (Universal Records); "King Of The Gil" – Enrique Gil (Star Music); "SOS" – Solenn Heussaff (Universal Records); "Batchmates" – Batchmates (Polymax Trax); "Jumpstart" – Pop Girls (Viva Records); "Chicser Party" – Chicser (Viva Records)	**"The Nightingale Returns – Lani Misalucha (Star Music)**; "Dreaming of You" – Juris (S2S); "Acoustic Noel" – Noel Cabangon (Universal Records); "Chapter 10" – Charice (Star Music); "The Promise" – Raymond Lauchengco (Viva Records); "Janice Javier" – Janice Javier (Universal Records)
Compilation Album of the Year	Album Cover of the Year
**"The Erik Santos Collection" – Erik Santos (Star Music)**; "Bente" – Parokya ni Edgar (Universal Records); "Ikaw Lamang" – Various artists (Star Music); "Muling Buksan ang Puso" – Various artists (Star Music); "One More Try" – Various artists (Universal Records); "Juan dela Cruz" – Various artists (Star Music); "Magkasama Tayo sa Kwento ng Pasko" – Various artists (Star Music)	**"Hulog Ka ng Langit" – Regine Velasquez (Universal Records)**; "Abra" – Abra (Ivory Music); "Infinite" – Sam Concepcion (Universal Records); "With You" – Gary Valenciano (Universal Records); "I Heart You" – Daniel Padilla (Star Music); "Expressions" – Sarah Geronimo (Viva Records); "Alden Richards" – Alden Richards (Universal Records)

=== Concert category ===
Concert of the Year	Male Concert Performer of the Year
**"Arise: Gary V 3.0" – Gary Valenciano**; **Gab Valenciano, director**; "Playlist" – Lea Salonga; Bobby Garcia, director; "I-Vice Ganda Mo Ako Sa Araneta" – Vice Ganda; Bobet Vidanes, director; "Voices of Love" – Martin Nievera and Regine Velasquez; Rowell Santiago, director; "25: I Write The Songs: – Ogie Alcasid; Rowell Santiago, director; "Missing You" – Lani Misalucha; Rowell Santiago, director; "The Intense Prince of Pop" – Erik Santos; Johnny Manahan, director	**Gary Valenciano – "Arise: Gary V 3.0"**; Daniel Padilla – "DOS"; Vice Ganda – "I-Vice Ganda Mo Ako sa Araneta"; Ogie Alcasid – "25: I Write The Songs"; Martin Nievera – "Voices of Love"; Erik Santos – "The Intense Prince of Pop"; Bamboo – "By Request"
Female Concert Performer of the Year	
**Lea Salonga – "Playlist"**; Regine Velasquez – "Voices of Love"; Anne Curtis – "Anne-Kapal"; Sarah Geronimo – "Perfect 10"; Lani Misalucha – "Missing You"; Charice – "Power of Two"; Aiza Seguerra – "Power of Two"	

Note: There were no entries for Alternative Album of the Year.

=== Special awards ===
Pilita Corrales Lifetime Achievement Award: Lea Salonga Parangal Levi Celerio: Ryan Cayabyab
