= Yael Yuzon =

Filipino musician

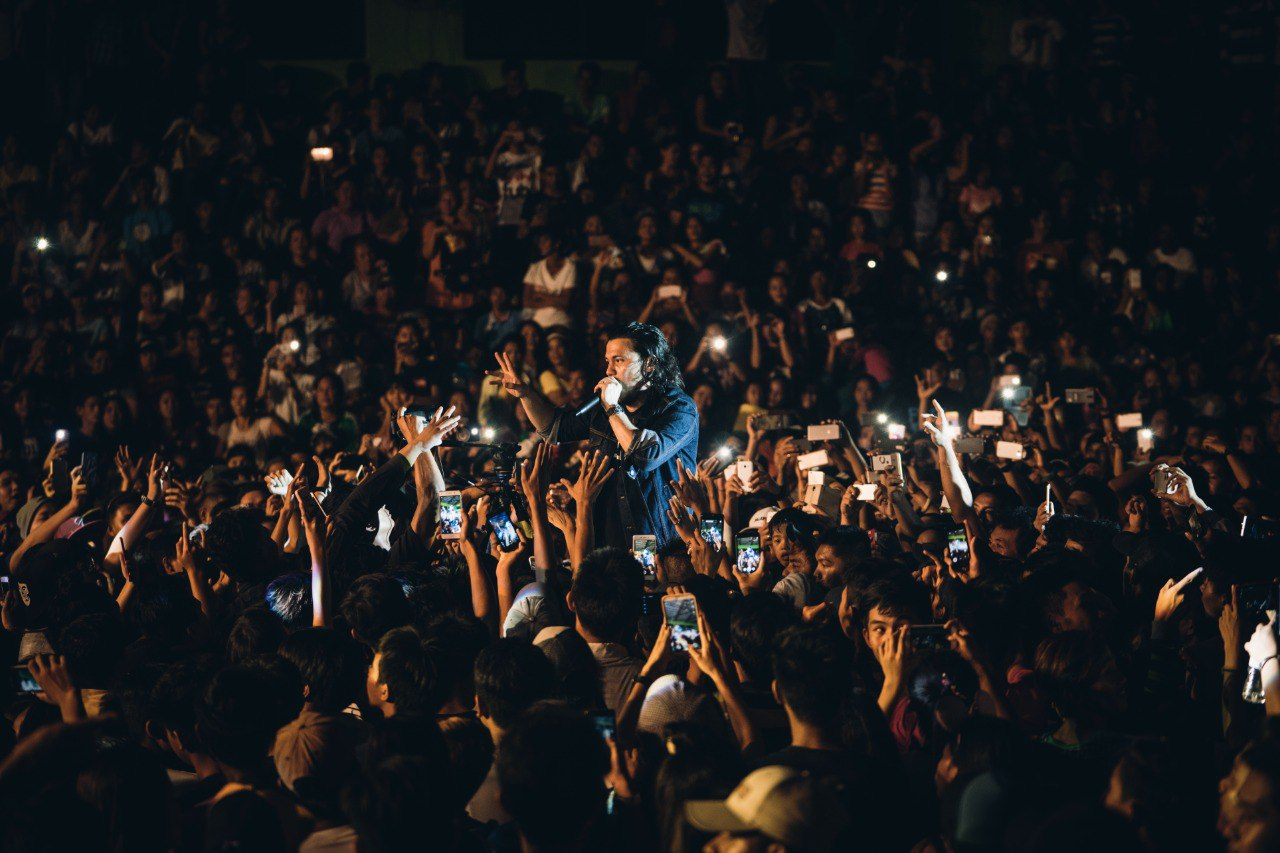
- Yuzon performing with Sponge Cola in 2019
- Born: Ysmael Yrastorza Yuzon; November 21, 1983 (age 42); Manila, Philippines
- Education: Ateneo de Manila University, (BA)
- Occupation: Singer-songwriter
- Years active: 2002–present
- Spouse: Karylle (m. 2014)
- Musical career
- Genres: Alternative rock, pop rock
- Instrument: Vocals, guitar, keyboards
- Label: Universal Records
- Member of: Sponge Cola

Ysmael "Yael" Yrastorza Yuzon (Tagalog: [jaˈʔɛl ˈjuzon]; born November 21, 1983) is a Filipino musician, best known as the vocalist and guitarist of the band Sponge Cola.

== Early life ==
Ysmael Yrastorza Yuzon was born on November 21, 1983, in Manila, Philippines. His elder brother is Yan Yuzon (of the bands Pupil and Archipelago) and he has a younger sister named Ysabel. His mother Elsa is a retired flight attendant and his father Johnny, a retired accountant. He is of Basque origin, as his grandfather was an immigrant from Gipuzkoa, Spain. He is a first cousin of Filipino singer and actress Donna Cruz.

Yuzon graduated from Ateneo de Manila University with a Bachelor of Arts in English Literature.

== Career ==
It all started in 1998 when Gosh Dilay and Yael Yuzon spotted each other in Ateneo High School and met through the theater club, Teatro Baguntao. Yuzon was the front man of a rock band named White Chapel at that time. However, since he and Gosh Dilay met, he always felt the urge to form a new band with Dilay and two other members of the group. That was then they form a band and call it "Sponge", named after R. S. Surtee's Mr. Sponge's Sporting Tour. However, soon after they formed Sponge, they learned about a Detroit grunge band already is using the name Sponge, that's why they all agree to add "cola" in result of "Sponge Cola." It gives their band name more semblances. This paved Yuzon's way to fame and the popularity of the band, as they competed and won several recognitions.

After a few years, Yuzon and Gosh Dilay remained in the band while the two other members leave and were replaced by Christopher "Chris" Cantada and Erwin "Armo" Armovit. Armovit was a former guitarist of the band Rampqueen, considered the sister band of Sponge Cola. Yuzon's career started early, though. His fame being the lead rock vocalist of the band has earned him many credits and awards as well. He and his bandmates came up with a self-titled EP in the last quarter of 2003. This is enclosed with five original songs namely, "Saturn," “Cigarette," “Jeepney," “Lunes," and "A Tear." These extensive songs have opened Yuzon's ability to adjust his vocal range to shift from mellow to scream o tone without losing its touch. With their self-titled EP, he was able to get more shows, exposures, and concerts from all over the country.

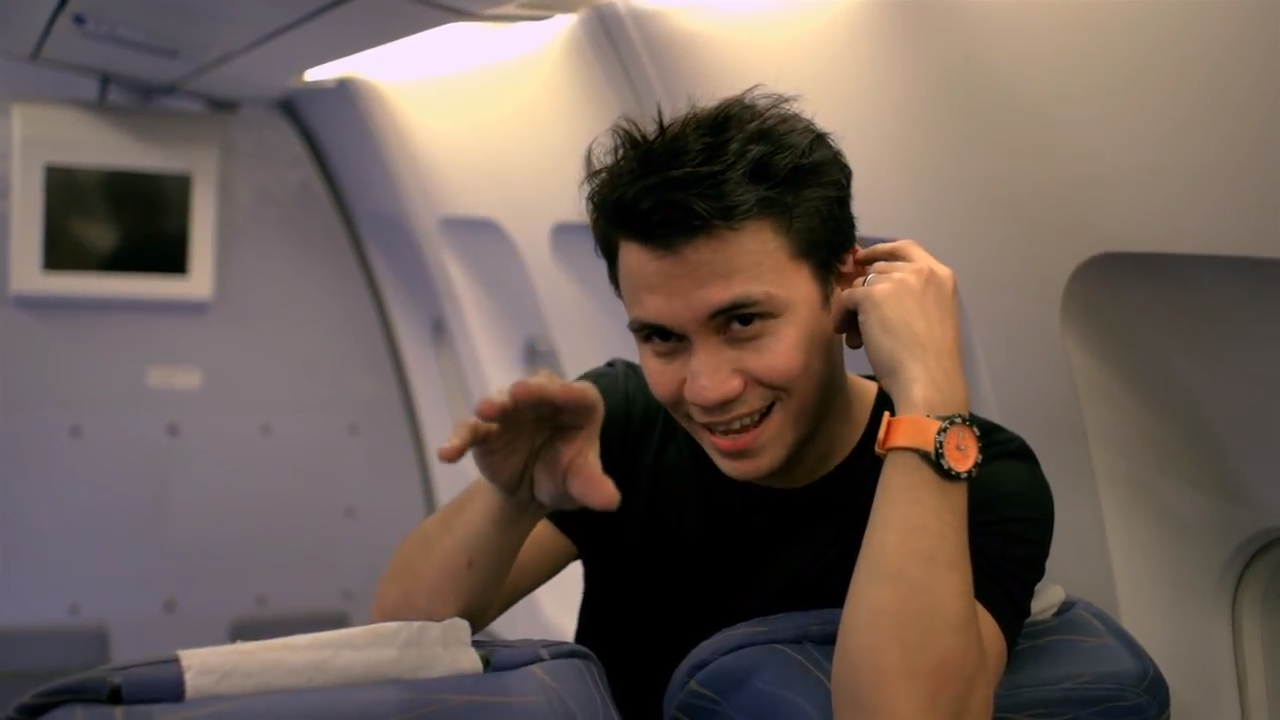
Yael Yuzon portrays as Eli in 2014 horror film Shake, Rattle & Roll XV.

Yuzon, too, managed to sing a version of Madonna’s "Crazy for You", which then became such an admired underground internet hit. The favorable response from the public further led Yuzon and his band mates to larger opportunities. The band's breakthrough in the mainstream was when they signed up for a record distribution under Sony BMG Records Philippines in their first full-length debut album. The band is now currently signed up for Universal Records.

The song "Tambay", which Yuzon co-wrote with Dilay, receives an outstanding Diamond record award with over 150,000 copies sold.

== Personal life ==
Yuzon was rumored to have dated singer-actress Karylle around 2010. In early 2011, both Yuzon and Karylle denied their relationship and have been rather evasive when it comes to said topic. By 2012, the two became more open about their relationship. On February 8, 2014, Karylle announced through It's Showtime that they are already engaged and their wedding is already set within March.

On March 21, 2014, Singer-actress Karylle married Yuzon in an afternoon ceremony attended by family and friends at the San Antonio de Padua Church in Silang, Cavite.

== Discography ==
=== With Sponge Cola ===
- Palabas (2004)
- Transit (2006)
- Sponge Cola (2008)
- Araw Oras Tagpuan (2011)
- Ultrablessed (2014)
- Sinag Tala (2016)
- Sea Of Lights (2019)
- Classic (2022)

=== EPs ===
- Sponge Cola EP (2003)
- Tambay EP (2011)
- District EP (2012)
- Sinag-Tala (2016)

=== Collaborations ===
- Super Size Rock (2003)
- Tunog Acoustic 3 (2004)
- Ultraelectromagneticjam: The Music of The Eraserheads (2005)
- Kami nAPO muna (2006)
- Super! The Biggest OPM Hits of the Year (2006)
- Pinoy Biggie Hits Vol. 2 (2006)
- Kami nAPO Muna Ulit (2007)
- Palabas: Best of OPM TV Themes (2007)
- Astig...The Biggest Band Hits (2008)
