= Tugish Takish =

Studio album by Pedicab
- Released: 2005
- Length: 30:18
- Label: Vicor Music Corporation
- Producer: Steven L. Tan

Pedicab chronology
Tugish Takish (2005)	Shinji Ilabas Mo Na Ang Helicopter (2008)

Tugish Takish is the debut studio album by the Filipino dance-punk band Pedicab, released 2005 on Vicor Music Corporation.

== Track listing ==
1. "Dizzy Boy" - 2:34
2. "Ang Kailangan" - 3:38
3. "Dito Tayo Sa Dilim" - 3:00
4. "Bleached Streaks" - 4:09
5. "A Stormy Night" - 4:13
6. "Bukas" - 2:59
7. "I Want It Now" - 2:13
8. "Konti Na Lang" - 2:27
9. "Giving and Receiving" - 3:06
10. "Sagot Kita" - 1:59
11. "Dizzy Boy" (Multimedia Track)
12. "A Stormy Night" (Multimedia Track)
