= Araw Oras Tagpuan =

Studio album by Sponge Cola
- Released: September 16, 2011
- Genres: Pinoy rock, pop rock, alternative rock, electronica
- Length: 48:35
- Label: Universal Records

Sponge Cola chronology
Sponge Cola (2008)	Araw Oras Tagpuan (2011)	District EP (2012)

Singles from Araw Oras Tagpuan
- 1. "Tambay" Released: March 18, 2011 (From Tambay EP); 2. "Regal" Released: July 17, 2011 (From Tambay EP); 3. "Kay Tagal Kitang Hinintay" Released: September 30, 2011; 4. "Stargazer" Released: January 20, 2012; 5. "She Wants You To" Released: April 5, 2012; 6. "Araw Oras Tagpuan" Released: July 1, 2012

Araw Oras Tagpuan (Day Time Rendezvous) is the fourth studio album of the Pinoy rock band Sponge Cola under Universal Records. The album is composed of 12 tracks, it was released on September 16, 2011. This is the first album to feature Tmac Cruz on drums.

== Composition ==
The album is mainly composed of rock ballads "Kay Tagal Kitang Hinintay,""Regal," "Stargazer," "She Wants You To" and "Araw Oras Tagpuan." The album features upcoming hip hop artists Ria Redulla and Los Magno, Salamin vocalist Paolo Valenciano, also Norma Love, Iwa Motor, and Mowmow. The collaboration with these artists adds hip hop, new metal, and retro to their music. Lead vocalist Yael Yuzon written or co-written nine tracks from the album along with Gosh Dilay. The tenth track "Warning" from the album features band member Tedmark Cruz on lead vocals.

== Album title ==
"Parang may swagger siya na... in this time, this place, I'll be there. Pero at the same time, meron din siyang parang dramatic element... time, date, place, setting. Parang part of a narrative or something... Parang may kuwento siya." -Yael Yuzon

The album's title comes from the 12th track "Araw Oras Tagpuan" which means date, time, setting.

== Singles ==
- "Tambay", the song was first released from the band's EP Tambay. The song's music video were released on April 19, 2011, and has already amassed over 2 million views.
- "Kay Tagal Kitang Hinintay", the song was first released from the band's 4th album. The song's music video were released on December 21, 2011, and has already amassed over 1 million views. The song is all about a love ballad; about waiting for that perfect someone and when it comes; it also describes the amazement and disbelief that the girl has accepted the man. The video was shot in Negros Occidental.
- "She Wants You To" is the 5th single and the most obscure of all released tracks from this album. The song is the only song released as a radio and internet single and the only song with no music video. The song is quite somber in tone, particularly, it is a continuation and reverse of the story that had occurred in the lyrics of "Kay Tagal Kitang Hinintay". The song is also set in English, and is the reverse of the supposedly emotional meaning of the Tagalog lyrics of "Kay Tagal Kitang Hinintay". Because of its hidden nature and less exposure, the song is only known by a few people.

== Track listing ==
All lyrics are written by Yael Yuzon and Gosh Dilay; all music is composed by Sponge Cola, except where noted.

No.	Title	Length
1.	"Tambay ("Hang Out")"	3:34
2.	"Stargazer"	4:06
3.	"Regal"	4:45
4.	"Ok Dito ("It's Okay Here")"	2:27
5.	"She Weeps"	3:58
6.	"Kay Tagal Kitang Hinintay ("I've Been Waiting For You For So Long ")"	4:43
7.	"She Wants You To"	3:32
8.	"Walang Wakas ("Never Ending")"	4:18
9.	"New Steel" (featuring Paolo Valenciano, Ria Redulla, & Los Magno)	3:20
10.	"Warning:" (featuring Norma Love, Iwa Motor, & Mowmow)	5:43
11.	"Scenic View"	4:38
12.	"Araw Oras Tagpuan ("Day Time Setting")"	3:31

== Bonus Track ==
No.	Title	Length
13.	"Ez As Pi"	9:29

== Personnel ==
Sponge Cola

- Yael Yuzon - vocals, rhythm guitar
- Gosh Dilay - bass guitar, backing vocals
- Erwin Armovit - lead guitar
- Tmac Cruz - drums, percussion, vocals in "Warning"

== Release history ==
Region	Date	Label
Philippines	September 16, 2011	Universal Records
