= Una (song) =

Single by Sponge Cola

from the album Palabas
- Released: 2004
- Genre: Hard rock, post-grunge
- Length: 4:41
- Songwriter: Gosh Dilay

"Una" (transl. First ) is a song performed by Filipino rock band Sponge Cola. It is tenth track from their debut album, Palabas. It became #1 in Philippines' popular music charts.

The song begins with a dramatic nylon guitar intro riff by lead guitarist Erwin Armovit, which is then layered by rhythm guitarist Yael Yuzon's chords. This section is carried on throughout all verses, except for the choruses, in which both guitars become heavily distorted.

The song is written and composed by Gosh Dilay.

== Music video ==
The music video was directed by Wincy Ong. It shows the band playing the song in an antique-styled, possibly haunted room.

Butterflies can be seen on the band's instruments while they are playing.

The room becomes darker on each chorus. On the bridge of the song, large amounts of dry ice are used all over the room. After a while, cut papers are seen flying in the room. Rain then occurs on the last chorus.
