= Chris Cantada =

Filipino musician, content creator and cosplayer

- Genres: Alternative rock; pop rock; OPM
- Instruments: Vocals, Drums
- Years active: 2002–present
- Formerly of: Sponge Cola

Chris Cantada (born 1985) is a Filipino musician, vlogger, podcaster and cosplayer best known as the former drummer and backing vocalist of the band Sponge Cola. He was featured in the music video of Sponge Cola's "Tambay" in a cameo guest appearance per post band departure. Cantada released his first solo album Heartbeat in 2011 with the carrier single of the same name. Since leaving the band, he has become a content creator.

== Early life ==
Cantada began as the lead singer of a band when he was in the 7th grade of high school. When he saw the film, That Thing You Do, he was inspired to become a drummer instead. Although he took a few formal drumming lessons, he mostly learned to play the drums by watching YouTube videos and live bands.

== Career ==
=== Sponge Cola ===
In high school, Cantada met Yael Yuzon as they were both part of a theater group at Ateneo High School. With Yuzon looking for a drummer, Cantada joined them. The band, which became known as Sponge Cola, was made up of Yuzon (vocals, guitar), Gosh Dilay (bass), Erwin Armovit (lead guitar) and Cantada (drums). Sponge Cola's debut album Palabas, was released in 2004 under Sony BMG, spawning radio hits like "KLSP", "Gemini", and "Jeepney". He was with the band for seven years. Together they released three albums.

However, their schedule took a toll on his health, as the band played two to three gigs a night. In 2008, it was announced that Cantada would be leaving the band. Cantada's departure however was done gradually as he was still in the band's forthcoming videos and TV appearances meant to promote new records. Sponge Cola hired session drummers to fill in Cantada's slot during live gigs, until Tedmark Cruz was officially announced as the new drummer in 2009.

==== Departure statement ====
This was a message from Erwin "Armo" Armovit (lead guitarist) to their fans:

Chris Cantada is leaving Sponge Cola, due to a worsening health condition, after the recording of the new selftitled album, he left the band. After the release of Transit (second album), he already said he would leave the band after one last album. No worries, there is no love lost between the boys and they keep the fire burning.

=== Solo ===
After leaving Sponge Cola due to health problems, Cantada worked as an audio engineer in a production house for several years. Three years after leaving the band, he released his solo debut album entitled Heartbeat (with all but one of the songs written by Cantada himself), distributed under Universal Records and co-produced by Yael Yuzon. The music video of his carrier single also titled "Heartbeat" was released in 2011. The music video for "Heartbeat" shows Cantada playing all musical instruments for the song.

Cantada's music video of the song "Jillian" was released in 2013. Sponge Cola was a featured artist in the music video with Cantada on guitar and vocals, Yuzon on drums, Dilay on bass, Armovit on guitar and Cruz on percussion. The song's title is a reference to Cantada's wife Jillian Gatcheco-Cantada. "Jillian" was first featured in Sponge Cola's debut studio album Palabas which was released in 2004 and was written and sang by Cantada himself in the album. Also during that year he reunited with Sponge Cola for their 15th anniversary concert at the Music Museum for a performance of "Gemini".

In 2023, Cantada released his first song since his solo album, "Dragon, Fly". He wrote it as a tribute to Jason David Frank, who he became friends with through his content creating career. In 2024, he released "Once", a song based on his devotion to the girl group Twice, specifically Jeongyeon. "Once" was recognized by Spotify Philippines as the Top Song in "Fresh Finds Philippines" of 2024.

=== Cosplaying and content creating ===
Cantada is also a known vlogger and cosplayer under the name Chris Cantada Force. An avid fan of Star Wars, he is a member of the 501st Legion, a Star Wars costuming community. He also cosplayed as members of the Power Rangers. After the release of his solo album, he focused on creating content on his YouTube channel Chris Cantada Force. His content is often focused on his love for Power Rangers, Star Wars, superheroes, or toy collecting. He was signed to Maker Studios, and has collaborated with cosplayer Alodia Gosiengfiao, actress Bianca King, and Power Rangers actor Chris Lee.

In 2024, Cantada launched his own podcast, “Once and Always a Fanboy,” where he interviews celebrities and artists.

== Personal life ==
Cantada is a graduate of Information Design at Ateneo De Manila University. He is influenced by drummer Dave Grohl of the Foo Fighters.

Cantada was obese until his second year in college. In 2009, he was diagnosed with tuberculosis pericarditis, which required surgery.

== Awards and nominations ==
Awards and nominations received by Chris Cantada
| Award | Year | Recipient | Category | Result | Ref(s) |
|---|---|---|---|---|---|
| NU Rock Awards | 2007 | Chris Cantada | Drummer of the Year | Nominated | |

== Discography ==
=== With Sponge Cola ===
- Albums
  - Palabas (2004)
  - Transit (2006)
  - Sponge Cola (2008)
- EPs
  - Sponge Cola EP

=== Solo ===
- Albums
  - Heartbeat (2011)
