= Dating Gawi =

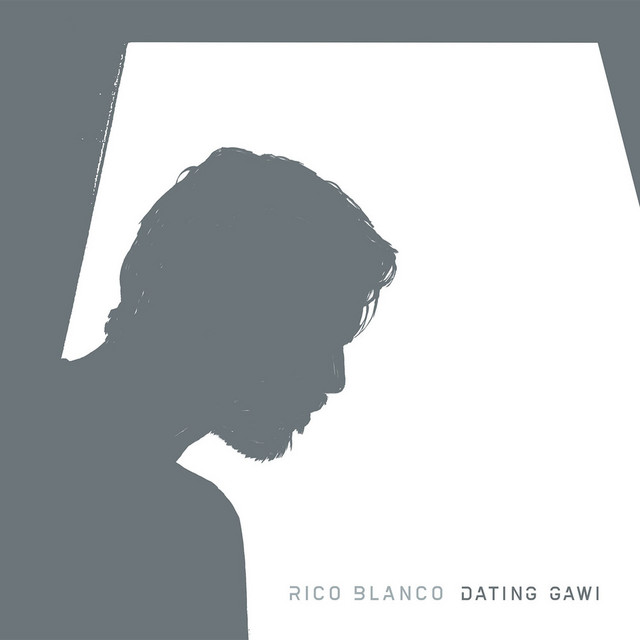

Studio album by Rico Blanco
- Released: November 27, 2015
- Recorded: 2015
- Genres: Alternative rock, symphonic rock
- Length: 27:50
- Label: Universal Philippines

Rico Blanco chronology
Galactik Fiestamatik (2012)	Dating Gawi (2015)

Singles from Dating Gawi
- 1. "Videoke Queen" Released: October 23, 2015

Dating Gawi (lit. 'Old Habits' in Tagalog) is the third studio album by Filipino singer-songwriter and multi-instrumentalist Rico Blanco. It was released in December 11, 2015, through Universal Records Philippines. It serves as his first album in three years, following his previous album, Galactik Fiestamatik. It features eight tracks, written in Filipino by Rico Blanco.

== Background and release ==
Rico Blanco premiered his third solo album, Dating Gawi, at Bootleg Bistro in Pasig on Thursday night. It was released the following day on November 27, 2015. The album is his first with Universal Records Philippines and his third since going solo in 2008, following the traditional method with the help of his friends Raimund Marasigan, Buddy Zabala, and Roll Martinez.

== Composition ==
The eight-track album, which features a mix of traditional instruments and unconventional ones, was recorded by Blanco alone using a cowbell, melodica, and a neighbor's junk.

In an interview, Blanco emphasized that Dating Gawi is a departure from his previous album, Galactik Fiestamatik, focusing on unconventional elements and avoiding innovative ones to ensure their success. He believes this approach aligns with his personal rule of not doing anything too innovative.

== Track listing ==
All tracks are written by Rico Blanco.

No.	Title	Length
1.	"Parang Wala Na"	3:08
2.	"Sorry Naman"	3:40
3.	"Walang Basagan"	2:41
4.	"Videoke Queen"	4:28
5.	"Wag Mong Aminin"	3:40
6.	"Alaala"	3:29
7.	"Umuwi Ka Na"	3:46
8.	"Chess"	2:53
Total length:		27:50
