= Palabas =

Studio album by Sponge Cola
- Released: October 18, 2004; August 23, 2005 (Romeo and Juliet Experience)
- Genres: Pinoy rock; alternative rock; pop rock
- Length: 58:17 (original release); 83:03 (repackaged version)
- Label: Sony BMG Music Philippines
- Producer: Sponge Cola

Sponge Cola chronology
Sponge Cola EP (2003)	Palabas (2004)	Transit (2006)

Singles from Palabas
- 1. "Una" Released: June 9, 2004; 2. "KLSP" Released: January 22, 2005; 3. "Gemini" Released: August 2, 2005; 4. "Jeepney" Released: October 15, 2005; 5. "Lunes" Released: March 21, 2006; 6. "Dragonfly" Released: April 13, 2006

Palabas is the debut studio album by Filipino rock band Sponge Cola. It was released on October 18, 2004, under Sony Music Philippines. This album contains some songs that the band members made even before the group was officially formed, and includes an abundance of Tagalog-language tracks.

Palabas spawned the singles "KLSP", "Lunes", "Gemini", "Una", and "Jeepney". An additional song, "Dragonfly", was released as online single in April 2006. The album was certified Gold by the Philippine Association of the Record Industry (PARI) in 2005 with sales of 15,000 physical CD copies. To date the album has sold over 28,000 pure CD copies.

In 2005, Sponge Cola released a repackaged edition of the album with a bonus CD that contains a music video for "Gemini", and some bonus audio tracks, including a remastered version of "Gemini", acoustic versions of "KLSP" and "Jeepney", and an unreleased track titled "Boundless".

In December 2013, Palabas was re-issued as part of Palabas & Transit Collection, a release that also includes the deluxe edition of Sponge Cola's second album, Transit.

== Background ==
Palabas means a "show / program" or "to come out" in Tagalog.

== Track listing ==
No.	Title	Writer(s)	Length
1.	"22"	Gosh Dilay	3:41
2.	"Partisan"	Yael Yuzon	4:41
3.	"KLSP"	Yuzon, Dilay, Chris Cantada	3:36
4.	"Neon"	Yuzon	4:37
5.	"On the Floor"	Yuzon	5:48
6.	"Stone's Throw"	Ely Buendia	3:53
7.	"Jillian"	Cantada	4:14
8.	"Lunes ("Monday")"	Dilay	3:35
9.	"To the Sly and Cunning"	Yuzon	3:39
10.	"Una ("First")"	Dilay	4:41
11.	"Dragonfly"	Yuzon	4:48
12.	"Gemini"	Yuzon	3:32
13.	"Jeepney"	D. Pendatum	5:23
14.	"Closure"	Yuzon	2:13
Total length:			58:17

Palabas: The Romeo and Juliet Experience
No.	Title	Length
1.	"Gemini" (Music video)	4:44
2.	"Gemini" (Remastered version)	3:50
3.	"KLSP" (Acoustic version)	3:52
4.	"Boundless"	4:01
5.	"Jeepney" (Acoustic version)	5:09
6.	"Gemini" (Piano version)	3:10
Total length:		1:23:03

== Personnel ==
Sponge Cola

- Yael Yuzon - vocals, rhythm guitar
- Gosh Dilay - bass guitar
- Erwin Armovit - lead guitar
- Chris Cantada - drums, backing vocals

Album Credits

- Drums Recorded by: Louie Talan at the Wombworks Studios
- Recorded at: The Three Studios
- Mixed by: Sponge Cola at the Three Studios and By Mong Alcaraz & Jorel Corpuz at Funkville Studios
- Mastered by: Zach Lucero
- Additional Guitar tracks for tracks 2,5 & 12 recorded at: Knive Studios
- Album Cover Design & Layout by: Jade Maravillas
- Photography by: Raymond Fabul

== Accolades ==
Year	Award giving body	Category	Nominated work	Result
2005	Nu 107.5 2004 Year End Countdown	Top 107 Songs for 2004 (ranked from #107 to #1)	"Jeepney"	59th
2005	Nu 107.5 2004 Year End Countdown	Top 107 Songs for 2004 (ranked from #107 to #1)	"KLSP"	102nd
