= Paalam (song) =

2025 single by Rico Blanco

Single by Rico Blanco
- Language: Tagalog
- English title: Goodbye
- Released: August 1, 2025
- Genre: Ballad; Soft rock
- Length: 3:03
- Label: Sony Philippines
- Songwriter: Rico Blanco
- Producer: Rico Blanco

Rico Blanco singles chronology
"Kisapmata" (2024)	"Paalam" (2025)

"Paalam" (transl. Goodbye) is a song by Filipino singer-songwriter and multi-instrumentalist Rico Blanco. It was released as a digital single on August 1, 2025, through Sony Music Philippines. Written and produced by Blanco and mastered by Simon Gibson, the track describes as a hauntingly spare yet exquisitely crafted ballad that captures the bittersweet and hopeful glory of goodbyes.

== Background and release ==
Following the renewed success of Blanco's solo singles, who recently resurged on the internet, peaked on the Spotify Philippines. He also returns with his new single, "Paalam" on August 1, 2025. It is his first single release in 2025, which follows his rendition of Rivermaya's song "Kisapmata," which was released on July 19, 2024.

Blanco revealed that his single "Paalam" was the longest song he's released, taking him years to complete, despite most of his songs were finished in minutes, days, or weeks.

== Composition ==
The track was written and produced by Rico Blanco, with provided by Simon Gibson for mastering engineer and Angelo Rozul for mixing engineer. Musically described as "equal parts love song and meditation on loss," "Paalam" is a heartfelt ballad that also utilizes powerful and primal elements through its intricate orchestral build and kundiman arrangements. It serves as a hauntingly spare yet exquisitely crafted ballad that captures the bittersweet and hopeful glory of goodbyes. Blanco said in a press statement that he expressed his desire for a timeless, traditional arrangement in the song's production.

The song was inspired by a former Rivermaya bandmate's departure in the 90s, evolved after Blanco's brother, King, who died in May 2025. For years, he initially focused on finding the right singer for the song, but the song required something personal.

== Credits and personnel ==
Credits are adapted from Apple Music.

- Rico Blanco – vocals, songwriter, lyrics, producer, mixing engineer
- Simon Gibson – mastering engineer
- Angelo Rozul – mixing engineer
