= Nasaan si Francis? =

- Directed by: Gabriel Fernandez
- Written by: Gabriel Fernandez (play); Lore Reyes
- Produced by: Christopher De Leon; Epi Quizon
- Starring: Epi Quizon; Paolo Contis; Rico Blanco; Christopher De Leon
- Cinematography: Miguel V. Fabie III
- Edited by: Michael de Castro
- Release date: February 1, 2006
- Running time: 84 minutes
- Country: Philippines
- Languages: Tagalog; English

Nasaan si Francis? (English: Where is Francis?) is 2006 Philippine comedy film by Gabriel Fernandez which stars Paolo Contis, Epi Quizon, Christopher De Leon and former Rivermaya frontman Rico Blanco. The movie is based on Fernandez's theatrical play of the same name.

== Plot ==
Boy (Paolo Contis) is struggling to save his girlfriend Sofia (Tanya Garcia), who is forced to work as a prostitute for the scheming Madam San (Rio Locsin). Boy and his best friend Sonny (Rico Blanco) visit their childhood friend Francis (Epi Quizon), who is now a violent drug dealer. Unexpectedly, Francis suffers from a heart attack and dies. Instead of reporting the incident to his family, Boy and Sonny hid Francis' body as they searched the entire house for the tablets of Ecstasy, which they were hoping to sell. Chaos ensues when Francis' family and girlfriend, as well as drug pusher Rocky (Christopher De Leon) find out about his death.

== Cast ==
=== Main cast ===
- Epi Quizon as Francis
- Paolo Contis as Boy
- Rico Blanco as Sonny

=== Supporting cast ===
- Christopher de Leon as Rocky
- Angel Aquino as Anne
- Rita Avila as Lin-Lin
- Julia Clarete as Candy
- Ricky Davao as Manong Jay
- Michael de Mesa as policeman
- Tanya Garcia as Sofia
- Mark Gil as Lin-Lin's boyfriend
- Rio Locsin as Mama Bel
- Karl Roy as Marmar
- Monty Macalinao as Rocky's driver
