= Tambay (EP) =

EP by Sponge Cola
- Released: April 19, 2011
- Length: 25:10
- Label: Universal Records

Sponge Cola chronology
Sponge Cola (2008)	Tambay (2011)	Araw Oras Tagpuan (2011)

Singles from Tambay
- 1. "Tambay" Released: April 19, 2011; 2. "Regal" Released: August 1, 2011

Tambay is the second EP by the Pinoy rock band Sponge Cola, released under Universal Records on April 19, 2011.

== Scope ==
After a three-year hiatus due to personal issues, on April 19, 2011, Sponge Cola released its second EP, Tambay. It is only available by purchasing three 1.5 Liter Coca-Cola's at supermarkets and exchanging the receipt to a nearby redemption center. The album contains six tracks, the shortest of all albums they had made in years, but Yael says that it will contain newer and catchy tunes that will entice new listeners and as well as their long-time followers.
The first three songs of the album was a precursor to the development of their fourth studio album, Araw Oras Tagpuan, thus the three are also included in the said album, which was released on September 16, 2011.

== Commercial sales ==
Tambay EP became the first album by a band to receive a Diamond Record Award since Eraserheads. The album was awarded the Diamond Record Award for selling more than 150,000 units.

== Track listing ==
No.	Title	Length
1.	"Tambay"	3:37
2.	"Stargazer"	4:06
3.	"Regal"	4:45
4.	"E-Z as PI"	5:08
5.	"Walang Wakas"	4:17
6.	"Tambay (Acoustic)"	3:21

== Credits ==
- Yael Yuzon - vocals, rhythm guitar
- Gosh Dilay - bass guitar, backup vocals
- Erwin Armovit - lead guitar
- Tmac Cruz - drums
