= Galactik Fiestamatik =

Studio album by Rico Blanco
- Released: July 10, 2012
- Genre: Alternative rock, electronic rock, synthpop, symphonic rock, pop punk
- Length: 34:39
- Label: Warner Music Philippines

Rico Blanco chronology
Your Universe (2008)	Galactik Fiestamatik (2012)	Dating Gawi (2015)

Singles from Galactik Fiestamatik
- 1. "Amats" Released: June 11, 2012; 2. "Burado" Released: December 22, 2012; 3. "Lipat Bahay" Released: May 24, 2013

Galactik Fiestamatik is the second studio album by Filipino singer, Rico Blanco. It was released in 2012 and was his last release with Warner Music Philippines.

== Track listing ==
All tracks are written by Rico Blanco.

No.	Title	Length
1.	"Amats"	03:49
2.	"Burado"	02:51
3.	"Lipat Bahay"	03:21
4.	"When The Wheels Turn"	03:49
5.	"Sayaw"	04:28
6.	"Hours and Days"	05:21
7.	"Chismis"	02:39
8.	"What It Is?"	03:34
9.	"Ngayon"	04:47
Total length:		34:39

=== Bonus tracks ===
iTunes (bonus track version)
No.	Title	Length
10.	"The Endless"	06:31
Total length:		41:10
