= Rico Blanco =

Filipino musician (born 1973)

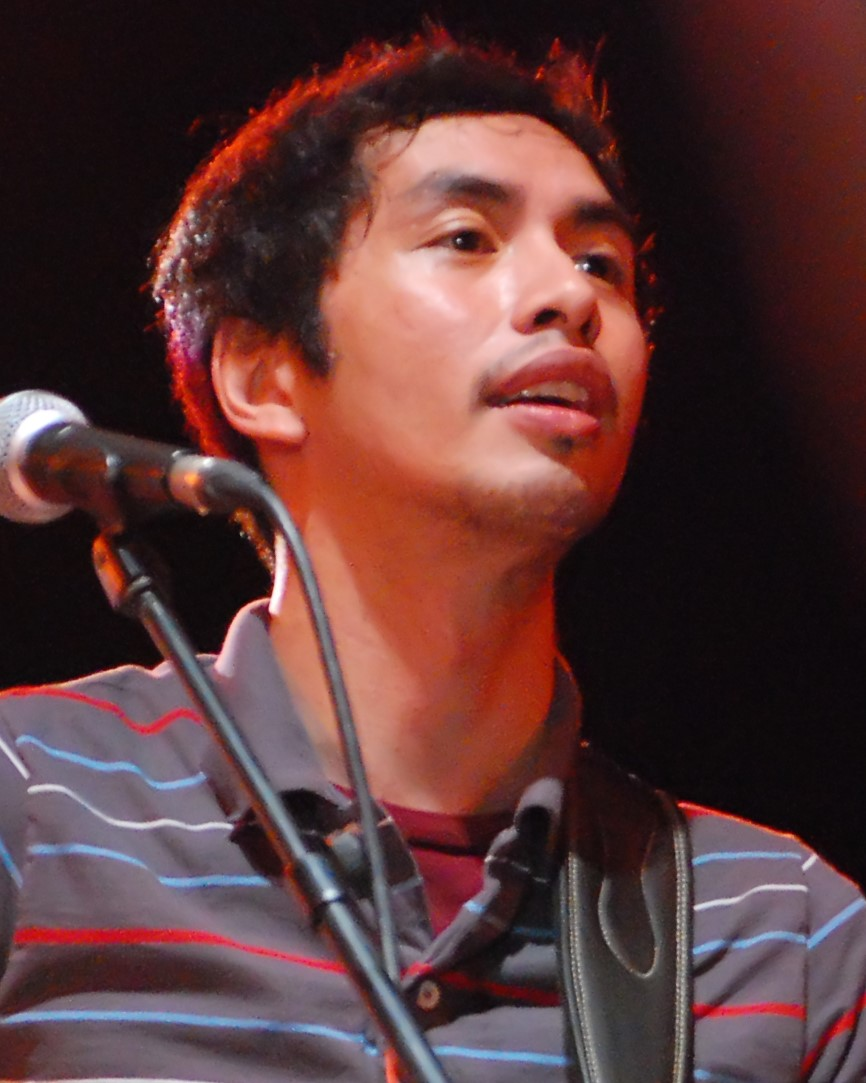
- Blanco in 2009

Background information
- Also known as: "Korics" "The (Music) Genius" "The Brains of Rivermaya"
- Born: Rico Rene Granados Blanco; March 17, 1973 (age 53); Ermita, Manila, Philippines
- Origin: San Pedro, Laguna, Philippines
- Genres: Alternative rock; pop rock; post punk; hard rock; folk rock; folktronica; symphonic rock; synthpop
- Occupations: Singer-songwriter; musician; actor; entrepreneur; record producer; endorser
- Instruments: Vocals; guitar; keyboards; bass guitar; drums; synthesizers; percussion
- Years active: 1993–2017; 2019–present
- Labels: Balcony Entertainment; Sony Music Philippines (current); Viva; Warner Music Philippines; Universal Records (former)
- Relatives: Kitchie Nadal (cousin)

Rico Rene Granados Blanco (born March 17, 1973) is a Filipino singer, songwriter, multi-instrumentalist, record producer, actor, endorser and entrepreneur. He began his career as one of the founding members, and served as the chief songwriter, vocalist, guitarist, and keyboardist of the Filipino rock band Rivermaya from 1994 until 2007, and has been a solo artist since 2008.

Blanco's songs and performances gained success and critical acclaim, earning himself a reputation of being one of the well-received local music icons in the Philippines.

== Early life ==
Rico Blanco was born at Manila Doctors Hospital in Ermita, Manila on March 17, 1973, to Rene Aldeguer Blanco of Iloilo City and Purita Crisostomo Granados of Leyte, Leyte. Blanco grew up in San Pedro, Laguna. Blanco graduated grade school at O. B. Montessori Center, high school at the Benedictine Abbey (now called San Beda College Alabang) and college at the Ateneo de Manila University with a degree in AB Management Economics where he was once a classmate of Kris Aquino. Blanco was an A-student and was accelerated twice in grade school. He was once a Sangguniang Kabataan chairman.

== Musical influences ==
At a young age, Blanco listened heavily to his uncle's records which included The Beatles, jazz and 1970s rock. He moved on to appreciate late 1970s to 1980s punk rock, post punk, synth pop and new wave artists (mostly from the U.K.) such as XTC, The Cure, The Smiths, U2, Echo & the Bunnymen, The Sex Pistols, The Clash, Depeche Mode, Kraftwerk, OMD, Tears for Fears, Ultravox, New Order, Madness, Terry Hall, Siouxsie & the Banshees, Midnight Oil (Aus), among others. He also listened to Filipino artists such as Deans December, Violent Playground, Identity Crisis, Urban Bandits, Joey Ayala, among others. The music he listened to while growing up is largely credited for his musical style.

== Early career ==
Blanco was one of the founding members of the Filipino rock band Rivermaya, in varying roles as vocalist, keyboardist, guitarist, and main songwriter from 1994 to 2007.

Among the albums Blanco produced are Slapshock's Project 11–41, Sugarfree's Sa Wakas, The Dawn's Salamat (Millennium edition single), Teeth's I Was a Teenage Tree and Rivermaya's Free album which won him an NU Rock award for Producer of the year. Blanco also used to host Myx Live!. He also composed and arranged scores for many commercials & other various corporate functions around the Philippines.

In May 2007, Blanco announced his departure from Rivermaya. His last performance with Rivermaya was on May 4, 2007, at the Metro Bar (wherein two other high-profile Filipino bands opened the show, Pupil and Sandwich; two spin-off bands of the legendary pop-rock group Eraserheads). It was coincidental that Blanco's first gig as singer for Rivermaya was also held at the Metro Bar (formerly known as "Kampo"). Furthermore, first ever Rivermaya gig (where Blanco was keyboardist) was in Las Piñas in 1993 where the band was the opening act for Eraserheads.

In 2007, he launched a clothing line for a clothing brand in the Philippines, Human. Blanco also wrote and produced an electronic dance music song titled "Control" for the album of Nancy Castiglione. In the same year, Rico Blanco was also cast as the voice actor of Ryusuke Minami, lead guitarist of the fictional band, Beck, in the Filipino dubbed edition of the anime series BECK: Mongolian Chop Squad.

== Solo career ==
=== Your Universe (2008–2011) ===
On June 12, 2008, Warner Music Philippines, launched Rico Blanco's first single "Yugto" which marked his entry in the Filipino music industry as a solo artist. Critics and music fans immediately hail it as a "neo-epic". The song won a host of awards, among them 4 major Awit awards including Song of the Year. His first album titled Your Universe was released on August 8, 2008. The 10-track CD is a unique fusion of diverse sounds, among them the ethno-rock "Yugto", the heart-tugging title track "Your Universe", the rockabilly/punk feel of "Ayuz", the sweet, Pinoy-folk "Para Hindi Ka Mawala", and the sing-along anthem "Antukin". Also notable is his return to his roots as a keyboard player as evidenced by the infusion of synthesizer and electronic elements throughout the album. Incidentally, Warner Music Philippines are known for disbanding bands and turning their respective lead vocalists into solo artists.

Blanco's live band was usually composed of Robert de la Cruz (of Queso and Skychurch) on drums and Ricci Gurango (formerly of Hungry Young Poets and Mojofly) on bass, while Blanco plays guitars and keyboards. Many other session musicians join him on stage from time to time.

In November 2008, Blanco won the "Vocalist of the Year" award in the NU Rock Awards. In December 2008, he was heralded RX93.1 "OPM Solo Artist of the Year". He also opened for Myx Mo 2008 and performed "Yugto". Aside from his band, The Mandaluyong Children's Choir, Manila Symphony Orchestra, Kulintangan musicians (headed by Malou Matute), and various Percussionists (headed by Iggy de Dios), all performed with him. The opening set was touted to be the biggest in the event's history.

In February 2009, he won as "Best New Artist" in the Myx Music Awards 2009. Then, Blanco was picked by Unilever Philippines to re-write and sing a version of the regional campaign song of Close Up toothpaste, released a single entitled "Come Closer".

In December 2009, Blanco launched his new music video for the single "Ayuz", it features his dance tribute to Gene Kelly and Fred Astaire, with Cristine Reyes as special guest.

The same year, Rico Blanco launched his first album "Your Universe" in other Asian countries such as Singapore and Hong Kong. The Asian release featured a new single "Neon Lights", the song quickly gained the number 1 spot in Hong Kong charts beating other artists such as Justin Bieber, Avril Lavigne, Wonder Girls and Mika.

On June 10, 2010, Rico Blanco Collaborated with PLDT-SME with the title "Bossing Ako" with Arnel Pineda. and was launched in NBC Tent at the Fort, Taguig City to serves as an anthem for entrepreneurs and would-be entrepreneurs.

In the same year, Blanco co-wrote the song "Chemistry" with Solenn Heussaff for the latter's self-titled debut album.

=== Galactik Fiestamatik ===
In 2012, Blanco released a new single, Amats, available for digital download via iTunes. The single was taken from his second studio album Galactik Fiestamatik released on July 10, 2012.

=== Dating Gawi ===
On October 6, 2015, Rico Blanco signs with Universal Records and plans to release his album in a November release with the help of fellow musicians Roll Martinez (Hale), Buddy Zabala (Eraserheads) & Raimund Marasigan (Eraserheads).

On November 11, 2015, Blanco released a Lyric Video on his new carry single "Videoke Queen". On November 27, 2015, Blanco released his third album Dating Gawi. His single "Wag Mong Aminin" was the number 1 song for 2016 in Magic 89.9's OPM chart.

=== Rivermaya semi reunion ===
On January 9, 2016, he re-united with his former Rivermaya co-members, Perf de Castro, Nathan Azarcon and Mark Escueta for a "surprise mini semi-reunion", following de Castro's gig at 19 East, Muntinlupa.

On July 3, 2019, Blanco collaborated with Filipino pop-funk band IV of Spades with the song "Nagbabalik" and a Music Video was released on July 15, 2019.

On July 28, 2019, his solo debut "Your Universe" was released in Vinyl Format

On May 1, 2020, Blanco released his new song "This Too Shall Pass" which served as a message to bring comfort to those who needed light and love amidst the COVID-19 pandemic and a music video was subsequently released on May 17, 2020

On August 25, 2020, Blanco released "Happy Feeling" and a music video was released on December 11, 2020

On May 27, 2021, Imperial Blue Whisky release a commercial with Rico Blanco singing the song "Alaala" as a tribute to summers past. On June 15, 2021, he posted a music video of the song "Alaala"(which was shot 6 years prior) on his YouTube channel.

On August 23, 2021, Rico Blanco produced the posthumous solo debut album of Slapshock frontman Jamir Garcia. He released the single "Paraiso" on September 5, 2021

On September 14, 2021, Blanco released his newest single, a reimagined version of "Pinoy Ako" entitled "Pinoy Tayo" for Pinoy Big Brother: Kumunity Season 10, the 10th season of the Philippine reality show Pinoy Big Brother. and a music video was released on February 7, 2022.

In 2024, Blanco created the musical score, which was inspired by electronic music and The Chemical Brothers single "Elektrobank", of the film Sunshine, starring his former partner Maris Racal.

On August 1, 2025, Blanco released his first original single, "Paalam", after his re-recorded single "Kisapmata" was released on July 19, 2024.

== Discography (as solo artist) ==
=== Albums ===
Year	Album title	Certifications	Label
2008	Your Universe	5× Platinum	Warner Music Philippines
2012	Galactik Fiestamatik	–	Warner Music Philippines
2015	Dating Gawi	–	Universal Records

=== Singles ===
List of singles as lead artist, showing year released, selected chart positions, and associated albums
Year	Title	Peak chart positions		Album
Year	Title	PHL	TPS	Album
2008	Yugto	–	–	Your Universe
2008	Your Universe	6	3	Your Universe
2009	Antukin	73	–	Your Universe
2009	Ayuz	–	–	Your Universe
2010	Bangon	–	–	Your Universe:Deluxe + Kahit Walang Sabihin (2-disc set)
2010	Neon Lights	–	–	Your Universe:Deluxe + Kahit Walang Sabihin (2-disc set) / Your Universe Southeast Asian Version
2011	Kahit Walang Sabihin	–	–	Your Universe:Deluxe + Kahit Walang Sabihin (2-disc set)
2012	Amats	–	–	Galactik Fiestamatik
2012	Burado	–	–	Galactik Fiestamatik
2013	Lipat Bahay	–	–	Galactik Fiestamatik
2013	Ang Tangi Kong Pangarap	–	–	Non-album singles
2014	Panahon Na Naman Ng Harana	–	–	Non-album singles
2014	Ito Ang Ating Sandali	–	–	Non-album singles
2014	World Without Strangers	–	–	Non-album singles
2014	Time For You	–	–	Non-album singles
2015	All The Seconds in Our Hours	–	–	Non-album singles
2015	Videoke Queen	–	–	Dating Gawi
2016	Wag Mong Aminin	–	–	Dating Gawi
2016	Sorry Naman	–	–	Dating Gawi
2019	Nagbabalik	–	–	Non-album singles
2019	Balisong - Transformed	88	–	Non-album singles
2020	Happy Feelin'	–	–	Non-album singles
2020	This Too Shall Pass	–	–	Non-album singles
2021	Pinoy Tayo	–	–	Non-album singles
2022	Palibot-libot	–	–	Non-album singles
2023	You'll Be Safe Here	16	6	Non-album singles
2023	Sayong sayo (Papel, Gunting, Bato)	–	–	Non-album singles
2024	Kisapmata (Note: Released as a re-recorded single)	–	–	Non-album singles
2025	Paalam	—	—	Non-album singles
2025	Healing (Someday I Might Fly)	—	—	Non-album singles

=== Year-end charts ===
Chart (2025)	Title	Position	Ref
Philippines Hot 100	"Your Universe"	49	

== Awards and nominations (as individual/solo artist) ==
Year	Award giving body	Category	Nominated work	Results
2008	NU Rock Awards	Vocalist of the Year	—N/a	Won
2008	NU Rock Awards	Guitarist of the Year	—N/a	Nominated
2008	NU Rock Awards	Artist of the Year	—N/a	Nominated
2008	NU Rock Awards	Producer of the Year	"Your Universe"	Nominated
2008	RX93.1 FM	OPM Solo Artist of the Year	—N/a	Won
2009	Awit Awards	Best Performance by a Male Recording Artist	"Yugto"	Won
2009	Awit Awards	Song of the Year	"Yugto"	Won
2009	Awit Awards	Best Musical Arrangement	"Yugto"	Won
2009	Awit Awards	Best Engineered Recording	Angee Rozul for "Yugto"	Won
2009	Myx Music Awards	Favorite New Artist	—N/a	Won
2009	NU Rock Awards	Song of the Year	"Antukin"	Won
2009	Philippine Radio Music Awards	Album of the Year	"Your Universe"	Won
2009	Philippine Radio Music Awards	Best Solo Artist	—N/a	Won
2009	Philippine Radio Music Awards	Best New Artist	—N/a	Won
2010	Myx Music Awards	Favorite Myx Live Performance	—N/a	Won
2012	25th Awit Awards	Best Performance by a Male Recording Artist	"Kahit Walang Sabihin"	Nominated
2012	25th Awit Awards	Music Video of the Year	"Kahit Walang Sabihin"	Nominated
2012	25th Awit Awards	Best Rock/Alternative Recording	"Ngayon"	Nominated
2012	PMPC Star Awards	Rock Artist of the Year	"Galactik Fiestamatik"	Won
2014	Myx Music Awards	Favorite Collaboration	with Gloc 9 for "Magda"	Won
2017	Myx Music Awards	Favorite Rock Video	"Videoke Queen"	Won
2021	34th Awit Awards	Best Pop Recording	"Happy Feelin"	Won
2023	36th Awit Awards	Dangal ng Musikang Pilipino Award	—N/a	Won
2023	36th Awit Awards	People's Voice Male Artist	—N/a	Nominated
2023	36th Awit Awards	World Music Recording	"Pumila Ka"	Nominated
2026	9th Eddy's Awards	Best Musical Score	Sunshine	Nominated
2026	9th Eddy's Awards	Best Supporting Actor	Manila's Finest	Won

== Charity and social activism ==
Blanco was a founding Sangguniang Kabataan chairman in his hometown of San Pedro, Laguna long before he started his music career.

Aside from his songwriter credits in his solo album and in Rivermaya, Blanco also arranged and wrote music for various cause-oriented projects such as the United Nations Millennium Development Goals theme "Tayo Tayo Rin", The Philippine Department of Tourism theme "Biyahe Tayo", both of which were performed by veteran Filipino musicians, such as Freddie Aguilar, the APO Hiking Society, Lea Salonga, and Sharon Cuneta. He also co-wrote "Posible", which has been used as a theme song for the 2005 Southeast Asian Games.

During his hiatus from music in 2007, Blanco spent his time with philanthropic work. In late 2007 he came out of retirement to sing for the Sumilao farmers who walked 1,700 km from Bukidnon to reach the Department of Agrarian Reform in Metro Manila.

Blanco, together with Imago vocalist Aia de Leon, and Sandwich frontman Raimund Marasigan, sang "Ako ang Simula", the theme song for a campaign which calls on Filipinos, especially the youth, to actively participate in the 2010 elections.

When super typhoons ravaged the Philippines in September 2009, Blanco responded quickly by writing, recording, and releasing "Bangon", to raise awareness and, ultimately, funds to help the victims of the typhoons. Blanco gave away the song as a free download to give hope to the victims; it served as a salute to the volunteers and responders, and to inspire people to continue helping. Blanco also said that he is waiving all royalties due to him for the mobile downloads of the song, which he will instead give to affected families.

In March 2011, Sesame Street Philippines went into a partnership with Blanco to launch the new education campaign called Sesame Street "Kid Ako". The campaign will launch in schools which will use Sesame Street books and videos to help encourage learning among kids at an early age. Blanco is also set to make two songs for the campaign.

When Typhoon Haiyan devastated his mother's home province, Blanco decided to spend the New Year holidays in a still-reeling and electricity-less Leyte and perform in as many evacuation centers as possible to comfort the survivors and help educate them about the importance of hygiene in preventing the spread of post-calamity diseases. A few weeks prior, just after the typhoon struck, Blanco nearly cancelled his appearance at the Sundown Music Festival in Singapore, but decided to forge on and dedicated his performance and talent fees to the people of Leyte.

In 2014, he released a single "Ito ang Ating Sandali" which become The ABS-CBN Sports+Action's station ID.

In 2016, Blanco became the president of the Filipino Society of Composers Authors and Publishers (FILSCAP), a non-profit, non-government collective management organization that champions intellectual property rights.

== Personal life ==
Blanco was in a relationship with actress and singer-songwriter Maris Racal from 2019 to 2024.

In January 2025, Rico's younger brother, King, suffered from an advanced squamous cell carcinoma, a type of sinus cancer. Months later, his brother died in May 2025.

== Other ventures ==
=== Acting ===
Rico Blanco is also a stage, film, and television actor. In May 2010, Blanco was announced to be on the cast of ABS-CBN's supernatural-political thriller TV series Imortal which stars John Lloyd Cruz and Angel Locsin, Blanco also sang the song "Kahit Walang Sabihin" for the said TV series. He also starred in another ABS-CBN soap opera May Isang Pangarap alongside Carmina Villarroel and Vina Morales.

In theater, he starred alongside Noel Cabangon and Joey Ayala in the Music Museum and 1970s Bistro production of Jesus Christ Superstar, while in movie, he starred alongside Epy Quizon and Christopher de Leon in the independent film Nasaan si Francis?. He also directed several music videos, won an award for his work as advertising musical arranger.

=== Visual Art ===
Blanco also dabbles in photography and painting. He also has several digital arts compiled in another Instagram account dedicated for such.

=== Endorsements ===
Throughout his career, Rico Blanco has partnered with some of the biggest brands in the Philippines for their advertising campaigns.

In 2014, he released a single "Ito ang Ating Sandali" which become The ABS-CBN Sports+Action's station ID.

In the same year, Rico Blanco was introduced as the newest brand ambassador of Giordano Philippines and released the song "World Without Strangers". Also on the same year, he teamed up with Valde Pastilles and released the song "Time For You" which was used for the brand's TV commercials.

=== Business interests ===
Blanco was a partner in Capone's Makati, and Alphonse Bistro/Vault in Pasig. He is currently a partner in Time in Manila in Makati and The Brewery at the Palace in Taguig.

In 2010, Rico Blanco established Loudbox, an audio production/post studio mainly catering to the Advertising industry. His business partners are Manuel Legarda of Wolfgang, Sach Castillo, Allan Feliciano, and Edsel Tolentino.

Also on the same year, following his endorsement in Human clothing brand, Blanco launched his own brand named Koboi, located at San Juan City, Metro Manila.

Also in 2010, Rico Blanco launched his record label company Balcony Entertainment in cooperation with Warner Music Philippines. It's likewise an artist management company with Ebe Dencel, Raven, Zild, Maris Racal and Never the Strangers, among others as artists under its roster.

In March 2022, Blanco revealed his biggest project that has nothing to do with music, and that he is set to open a commercial space. He opened a hotel in San Juan, La Union in 2025.

In February 2023, Blanco opened the doors of Balcony Music House, a music hall catering to different music artist and music events.

== Filmography ==
=== Television ===
Year	Title	Role
2004	Myx Live!	Host
2007	Beck: Mongolian Chop Squad	Voice of Ryusuke Minami
2010–2011	Imortal	Lucas Teodoro
2013	Kanta Pilipinas	Host/Judge
2013	May Isang Pangarap	Joseph 'Otep' Santos
2016	Born To Be A Star	Host/Judge
2016, 2021	ASAP Natin To	Himself / Performer
2022	The Goodbye Girl	

=== Movies ===
Year	Title	Role
1994	Pare Ko: The Movie	Himself/Rivermaya
1996	Istokwa	Himself/Rivermaya
2006	Nasaan si Francis?	Sonny
2011	Segunda Mano	Owen
2015	Liwanag sa Dilim	
2016	Camp Sawi	Aaron
2025	Manila's Finest	Epifanio Javier
2026	Project Baby	Migo

=== Music Video director ===
Year	Title	Artist/Band
2004	Liwanag Sa Dilim	Rivermaya
2013	Lipat Bahay	Rico Blanco
2015	Sabay	Never the Strangers
2021	Asa Naman	Maris Racal
2022	Di Papakawalan	
