= District (EP) =

EP by Sponge Cola
- Released: November 9, 2012
- Genre: Pinoy Rock
- Length: 24:49
- Label: Universal Records

Sponge Cola chronology
Araw Oras Tagpuan (2011)	District (2012)	Ultrablessed (2014)

Singles from Tambay
- 1. "XGF" Released: September 1, 2012; September 14, 2012 (Official Full Release); 2. "Mahaba Pa Ang Gabi" Released: November 2, 2012; 3. "Pick Your Poison" Released: April 12, 2013

District is the third EP by the Pinoy rock band Sponge Cola, released under Universal Records last November 9, 2012.

== Track listing and durations ==
No.	Title	Length
1.	"Mahaba Pa Ang Gabi"	3:51
2.	"Pick Your Poison"	2:53
3.	"Fireworks"	4:46
4.	"XGF"	2:57
5.	"It's About You Girl (XGF What She Said REMIX) Featuring Los Magno & Sitti"	2:58
6.	"Twelve"	3:13
7.	"Mahaba Pa Ang Gabi (Acoustic Version)"	4:11

== Personnel ==
- Yael Yuzon - vocals, rhythm guitar
- Gosh Dilay - bass guitar, backup vocals
- Erwin Armovit - lead guitar
- Tmac Cruz - drums
- Los Magno - rap (on tracks 4 & 5)
- Sitti - Guest vocals (track 5)
- Chito Miranda - Guest vocals (track 4)
