= Ultrablessed =

Studio album by Sponge Cola
- Released: January 31, 2014; February 14, 2015 (Thank You Edition)
- Genres: Pop rock, rock
- Length: 34:42
- Label: Universal Records

Sponge Cola chronology
District (EP) (2012)	Ultrablessed (2014)	Palabas & Transit Collection (2014)

Singles from Ultrablessed
- 1. "Kailangan Kita" Released: November 27, 2013; 2. "Anting-Anting" Released: February 7, 2014; 3. "Singapore Sling (Dahil Kilala Na Kita)" Released: March 23, 2014; 4. "+63 (Featuring Yeng Constantino)" Released: July 5, 2014; 5. "Move On (from Thank You Edition)" Released: February 11, 2015; 6. "Walk Away (Radio Promo only)" Released: May 28, 2015; 7. "Iyong-Iyong-Iyo" Released: June 28, 2015

Ultrablessed (Stylized as ULTRABLESSED) is the fifth studio album of the Pinoy rock band Sponge Cola. The album is composed of 11 tracks, and it was released on January 31, 2014 under Universal Records. This album shows the journey and friendship of the members of the band for the past 10 years and also shows some new and fresh musical arrangements and quality which shows the showmanship of Sponge Cola.

The first single from Ultrablessed is "Kailangan Kita". The deluxe edition was bundled with a maximum capacity DVD for a limited release. Ultrablessed Thank You Edition was released on February 14, 2015.

== Track listing ==
=== Ultrablessed track listing ===
All music is composed by Sponge Cola, except where noted.

Standard disc
No.	Title	Lyrics	Length
1.	"Hawla"	Gosh Dilay	3:11
2.	"Kailangan Kita"	G. Dilay	3:06
3.	"Anting-Anting" (featuring Gloc-9 and Denise Barbacena)	Yael Yuzon, G. Dilay, Aristotle Pollisco, Barbacena	4:22
4.	"Iyong-Iyong-Iyo"	Yael Y., G. Dilay	4:40
5.	"9 To Sawa"	Yanni Yuzon	3:25
6.	"+63" (featuring Yeng Constantino)	Yael Yuzon, G. Dilay	4:53
7.	"Walk Away"	Gabriel Ignatius Chee Kee	2:13
8.	"R.I.C.E"	Karylle Tatlonghari	0:35
9.	"Singapore Sling (Dahil Kilala Na Kita)"	Yael Y., G. Dilay	4:40
10.	"The Answer"	Yael Yuzon	3:37
Total length:			34:42

Bonus track
No.	Title	Lyrics	Length
11.	"Segundo / Dragonfly"	Yael Yuzon, Paul Arsemin	10:02
Total length:			44:44

=== Thank You Edition ===
Thank You Edition disc
No.	Title	Lyrics	Length
12.	"Move On"	Yael Yuzon, Gosh Dilay	3:54
13.	"Iyong-Iyong-Iyo (Flying Through the Hills version)"	Yael Y., Paul Arsemin	4:35
14.	"Kailangan Kita (acoustic version)"		3:01
Total length:			56:02

== Maximum Capacity Concert ==
DVD
No.	Title	Length
1.	"22"
2.	"KLSP"
3.	"Tuliro"
4.	"Tambay"
5.	"Ako Na Lang (featuring Zia Quizon)"
6.	"Una"
7.	"Jillian(Cut)"
8.	"Gemini (featuring Chris Cantada on piano)"
9.	"AYT (featuring Gary Valenciano)"
10.	"Puso (featuring Gary Valenciano)"
11.	"Neon (Acoustic)"
12.	"Jeepney (Acoustic)"
13.	"XGF (featuring Ryan Bang and Los Magno)"
14.	"Bitiw (featuring Ryan Bang)"
15.	"Kay Tagal Kitang Hinintay"

== Personnel ==
- Yael Yuzon = vocals, rhythm guitar
- Gosh Dilay = bass guitar, backup vocals
- Erwin Armovit = lead guitar
- Tmac Cruz = drums

== Release history ==
Region	Date	Label	Version
Philippines	January 31, 2014	Universal Records	Standard & Deluxe editions
Philippines	February 14, 2015	Universal Records	Thank You edition
