= Myx Live! =

Philippine music television program

- Genre: Music television
- Presented by: Jett Pangan (until 2014); Rico Blanco (2005)
- Country of origin: Philippines
- No. of seasons: 4

Production
- Camera setup: Single-camera setup
- Running time: 30 minutes

Original release
- Network: Myx Global
- Release: June 3, 2002 – present

Myx Live! is a Philippine television music television program broadcast by Myx Global. Originally hosted by Jett Pangan, it premiered on June 3, 2002.

== Premise ==
The program showcased performances from various Filipino artists and bands, including Chicosci, Sugarfree, Kamikazee, Gloc-9, Paraluman, Hilera, and Mayonnaise. In 2014, the show was described by Myx as "an intimate, private concert in the comfort of your home" featuring weekly showcases of bands and solo performers.

== Hosts ==
Host

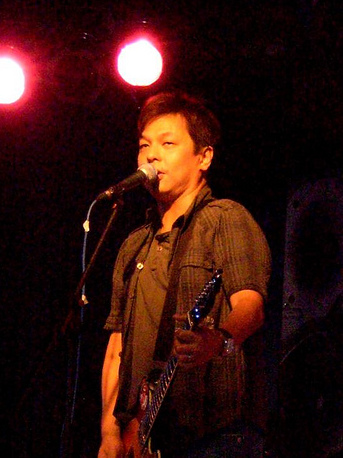
Jett Pangan

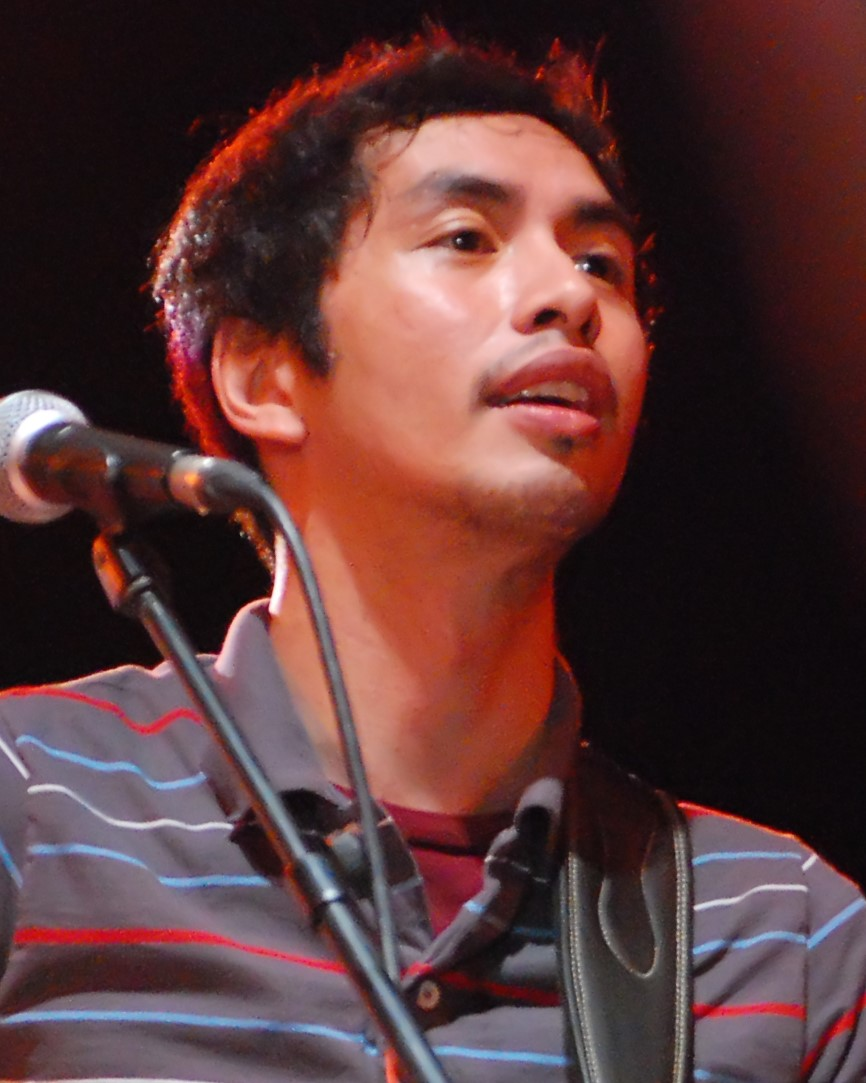
Rico Blanco

- Jett Pangan
- Bernard Palanca
- Rico Blanco

== Revival ==
=== Season 1 ===
On September 22, 2022, Myx Live! returned with a new season as part of Myx Global's expanded digital programming initiatives. The revived format retained the show's signature one-camera performance setup while incorporating mini-interviews and behind-the-scenes segments. According to Myx head Miguel Llanera, the revival aimed to bring back "a staple show that's been on Myx for a while" while introducing a refreshed presentation with new artists and aesthetics.

The new season featured local and international artists including Magnus Haven, Alamat, and Clara Benin.

=== Season 2 ===
Further information about this season is currently unavailable.

=== Season 3 ===
The third season of Myx Live! premiered on September 15, 2023. The season featured performances by Ben&Ben, Sugarcane, Kaia, Maki, Last Section, PlayerTwo, Leanne & Naara, and Rob Deniel.

=== Season 4 ===
The fourth season of Myx Live! premiered on September 5, 2024.

Season 4 also introduced a more artistic visual approach, encouraging featured artists to incorporate creative fashion, style, and imagery into their performances.

== Accolades ==
Accolades received by Myx Live!
| Year | Award | Category | Recipient | Result | Ref. |
|---|---|---|---|---|---|
| 2005 | 14th KBP Golden Dove Awards | Best TV Culture and Arts Program, National Category | Myx Live! | Won | |

On October 25, 2005, Myx Live! won as Best TV Culture and Arts Program, National Category in the 14th KBP Golden Dove Awards. The winning episode was the Great Original Pilipino Music, which featured the San Miguel Philharmonic Orchestra, the San Miguel Master Chorale with its artistic and executive director Ryan Cayabyab. This was made possible by the San Miguel Foundation for the Performing Arts and Sony BMG.
