= Pedicab (band) =

Filipino alternative rock band

- Origin: Manila, Philippines
- Genres: Alternative rock; rap rock; dance-punk; electronica
- Years active: 2004–present
- Labels: MCA Music; Soupstar Entertainment; Vicor Music
- Members: Diego Mapa; Jason Caballa; Raimund Marasigan; Mike Dizon; RA Rivera

Pedicab is a Filipino electronic rock group based in Manila formed in 2004.

== History ==
Pedicab is composed of Diego Mapa ("Daddy Maps") on lead vocals and synths, Raimund Marasigan ("Sugar Raims") on synth bass and percussion, Mike Dizon ("Masterbeat") on drums and percussion, Jason Caballa ("J.Sonic") on guitar, and RA Rivera ("Just Toni") on synths, sampler, and percussion.

The band formed in August 2004 and played their first gig in September that year. In 2005, the band released their self-produced debut album entitled Tugish Takish under Vicor Music. Recorded in four days at Sound Creation Studios, Tugish Takish contains ten tracks, including the singles "Dizzy Boy," "Dito Tayo Sa Dilim," "Konti Na Lang," and "Bleached Streaks," with videos directed by RA Rivera. The band capped off the year by earning nominations for Album of the Year and Best New Artist at the NU 107 Rock Awards, winning in the latter category.

A home demo entitled "Pa-Experience" was written for the compilation Rock Against The Round: Musicians Against The WTO in 2005. (A full band recording of the song was retitled "Pa-Taste" and appeared on the band's second album.) In December of that year, Pedicab performed in a street concert in Hong Kong (along with Noel Cabangon and the Radioactive Sago Project) organized by various Filipino NGOs in protest against the World Trade Organization. In July 2006, when the WTO reconvened in Geneva, Switzerland, the band flew there to perform as well.

In 2007, Pedicab recorded a version of the VST and Company classic "Awitin Mo, Isasayaw Ko," which was included in the "Manila Sound" tribute compilation Hopia Mani Popcorn 2: The Best Of Manila Sound, released under Viva Records.

The group signed a recording deal with MCA Music for their second album, Shinji Ilabas Mo Na Ang Helicopter, released in 2008. Produced by the band with assistance from Buddy Zabala and Mong Alcaraz, the album is a progression from the raw, dance-punk sound of their first record, with more varied beats and grooves, multiple guitar tracks, samples, and melodic (i.e. sung) vocals. The video for the carrier single "Ang Pusa Mo" was again directed by RA Rivera, and featured the band members being physically abused by beautiful women, including cosplay sisters Alodia Gosiengfiao and Ashley Gosiengfiao, current TV5 news anchor Shawn Yao, fashion blogger Tricia Gosingtian, and others. It won the Favorite Rock Video award at the 2009 Myx Music Awards.

In March 2009, the band performed in Singapore for the annual Mosaic Music Festival, sharing the stage with Thai indie-pop quintet 15th Scenery and Chinese new wavers New Pants.

In 2012, Pedicab released Kaya Mo Mag-Sando?, a six-track EP with the singles "Otomatik" and "Insekto." The EP showcases an even more evolved sound from the previous record, with several songs featuring acoustic guitars, various percussion instruments, and even more samples. That same year, the band contributed a new song, "Ubusan ng Lahi," recorded live for the soundtrack of the Marie Jamora-directed feature-length film and 2012 Cinemalaya Festival entry, Ang Nawawala. The band also appeared in the movie as themselves, performing the song live. The Ang Nawawalang Soundtrack was released on vinyl in 2013.

In 2013, Pedicab wrote and recorded "Ang Dakilang Duwag Ng Katipunan" for the Rock Ed Philippines and Ballet Philippines production, Rock Supremo, a ballet performance about the life of Philippine revolutionary hero Andres Bonifacio, set to original music contributed by Filipino rock acts, including Ebe Dancel, Sandwich, Peryodiko, Peso Movement, Radioactive Sago Project, and others. The show ran for eight dates in September 2013.

In 2014, Pedicab performed at the P-Fest UK in Leeds and London, United Kingdom together with Top Junk, Kate Torralba, Squid 9, The Diegos, Sandwich (band) and Yano, as well as UK-based Filipino bands.

The band spent most of 2015 writing new songs and are getting ready to go into the studio to record a new album in 2016.

== Members ==
- Diego Mapa (lead vocals/guitar/synths)
- Jason Caballa (lead guitar/backing vocals)
- Raimund Marasigan (synth bass/keyboards/keytar/backing vocals)
- Mike Dizon (drums/percussion)
- RA Rivera (sampler/programming/mixing/keyboard synths/percussion/backing vocals)

== Discography ==
=== Studio albums ===
- Tugish Takish (2005; Vicor Records)
- Shinji Ilabas Mo Na Ang Helicopter (2008; MCA Music, Inc.)
- Kaya Mo Mag-Sando? (2012; MCA Music, Inc.)
- Remuda Triangle (2017; Soupstar Music)

=== Compilations ===
- "Pa-Experience," Rock Against The Round: Musicians Against The WTO (2005; independent)
- "Awitin Mo, Isasayaw Ko" (VST and Company cover), Hopia Mani Popcorn 2: The Best Of Manila Sound (2007; Viva Records)
- "Sakto Sa Pasko," Sakto Sa Pasko (2008; Soupstar Music)
- "Ubusan Ng Lahi," Ang Nawawalang Soundtrack (2012; Indie Pop Records)
- "Ang Dakilang Duwag Ng Katipunan," Rock Supremo (2013; Rock Ed Philippines/Ballet Philippines)

=== Singles ===
- "Dizzy Boy"
- "Dito Tayo sa Dilim"
- "Konti Na Lang"
- "Bleached Streaks"
- "Ang Pusa Mo"
- "FX"
- "Simulan Mo Na"
- "Otomatik"
- "Insekto"
- "What's The Algorithm?"

== Awards ==
Year	Award giving body	Category	Nominated work	Results
2005	NU Rock Awards	Best New Artist	—N/a	Won
2005	NU Rock Awards	Drummer of the Year	(for Mike Dizon)	Nominated
2005	NU Rock Awards	Rising Sun Award	—N/a	Nominated
2005	NU Rock Awards	Best Male Award	(for Diego Mapa)	Nominated
2005	NU Rock Awards	Album of the Year	"Tugish Takish"	Nominated
2008	NU Rock Awards	Drummer of the Year	(for Mike Dizon)	Nominated
2008	NU Rock Awards	Best Album Packaging	(Ge Madriaga-Mapa for "Shinji Ilabas Mo Na Ang Helicopter")	Nominated
2008	NU Rock Awards	Best Music Video	"Ang Pusa Mo"	Nominated
