= Shinji Ilabas Mo Na Ang Helicopter =

Studio album by Pedicab
- Released: July 11, 2008
- Genre: Dance-punk, electronic rock
- Length: 46:15
- Label: MCA, Universal
- Producer: Mong Alcaraz, Buddy Zabala

Pedicab chronology
Tugish Takish (2006)	Shinji Ilabas Mo Na Ang Helicopter (2008)

Shinji Ilabas Mo Na Ang Helicopter is the second studio album by the Filipino dance-punk band Pedicab, released July 11, 2008 on MCA Records.

== Track listing ==
1. "FX" - 2:55
2. "Simulan Mo Na" - 3:56
3. "Ang Pusa Mo" - 3:51
4. "Deafening Silence" - 2:36
5. "Breaking Away" - 3:00
6. "Good to Go" - 4:26
7. "Put the Pieces Together" - 2:56
8. "Follow Through" - 3:25
9. "Laway" - 3:14
10. "Pa-Taste" - 3:01
11. "Mixed Feelings" - 2:43
12. "Deep Eyes" - 10:17
