= Transit (Sponge Cola album) =

Sponge Cola album

Studio album by Sponge Cola
- Released: September 8, 2006
- Recorded: Wombworks Studio
- Genre: Pinoy rock
- Length: 48:55 (original); 1:11:36 (repackaged version)
- Label: Universal Records
- Producer: Patrick Tirano; Sponge Cola

Sponge Cola chronology
Palabas (2004)	Transit (2006)	Sponge Cola (2008)

Singles from Transit
- 1. "Bitiw" Released: September 2, 2006; 2. "Tuliro" Released: December 1, 2006; 3. "Movie" Released: August 4, 2007; 4. "Pasubali" Released: January 21, 2008

Transit is the second studio album by the Pinoy rock band Sponge Cola, released on September 8, 2006, and their first under Universal Records. The album was certified Platinum by the Philippine Association of the Record Industry (PARI) with sales of 40,000 physical CD copies to date.

Transit spawned a carrier single, "Bitiw", which was released to radio stations on August 23. In 2008, Transit was re-released as Transit Deluxe, which features additional songs, acoustic versions of songs, a cover song by Apo Hiking Society, and a radio edit version, as well as a Video CD (VCD) containing music videos.

In late 2013, Transit Deluxe was re-issued as part of Palabas & Transit Collection, a release that also includes the standard edition of Sponge Cola's debut album Palabas; this release does not include a VCD.

== Background ==
In an interview, Yael Yuzon explained, "I think on the first record we just wanted to have an album out as a collection of songs written from high school; while on Transit, we wanted to push the limits of our song-writing so we took a creatively different approach for every song."

== In popular culture ==
The single "Bitiw" was used as a theme song for the television series Pedro Penduko. It was also performed in the second season of Your Face Sounds Familiar, when Yael Yuzon dueted with KZ Tandingan, the latter of whom impersonated Yael.

== Track listing ==
No.	Title	Writer(s)	Length
1.	"Bitiw ("Let Go")"	Words: by Dilay & Yuzon Music by: Dilay, Yuzon, Cantada Armovit	3:21
2.	"Tuliro ("Dumbfounded")"	Dilay	4:19
3.	"Movie"	Words by Armovit, Yuzon, Music by Yuzon	4:34
4.	"The Wandering"	Words: by Armovit & Yuzon Music by: Dilay, Yuzon, Cantada Armovit	5:45
5.	"Gunita ("Memory")"	Dilay	3:03
6.	"Do You Know the Feeling"	Words by Armovit, Yuzon, Yan Yuzon Music by Yan Yuzon	3:45
7.	"Sa Bingit ng Isang Paalam ("In The Brink of a Farewell")"	Dilay	4:15
8.	"Myself in You"	Cantada	4:34
9.	"All We Need"	Armovit & Yuzon	4:04
10.	"Nocturne"	Yael Yuzon	2:44
11.	"Pasubali ("Reservations")"	Dilay	4:59
12.	"Harapin ("To Face It")"	Dilay	3:33

=== Transit Deluxe (VCD) ===
Music Videos
No.	Title	Length
1.	"Sponge Cola Intro"
2.	"Bitiw"
3.	"Nakapagtataka"
4.	"Tuliro"
5.	"Tuloy Pa Rin"
6.	"Movie"
7.	"Pasubali"

=== Transit Deluxe (2008)/Palabas & Transit Collection(2013) ===
AVCD(Transit Deluxe)/Bonus Track(Palabas & Transit Collection)
No.	Title	Writer(s)	Length
1.	"Tuloy Pa Rin"	Dilay	2:58
2.	"Tuliro (Acoustic Version)"	Dilay	4:05
3.	"Nakapagtataka"	Jim Paredes	3:53
4.	"Pasubali (Acoustic Version)"	Dilay	3:56
5.	"Intercept"	Lyrics: Yael Yuzon, Music: Sponge Cola	4:03
6.	"Pasubali (Radio Edit)"	Dilay	4:06

== Members ==
- Yael Yuzon - vocals, rhythm guitar
- Gosh Dilay - bass guitar, additional guitar (track 12)
- Erwin Armovit - lead guitar
- Chris Cantada - drums, additional guitar (track 12), backing vocals

Additional Musicians

- Patrick Tirano - Additional Vocals (track 2,11), Additional Guitars (track 5,6)
- Bea Garcia - Additional Vocals (track 4)
- Yan Yuzon - Keyboards (track 6,9), Additional Guitars (track 6)
- Yosef Garcia - Additional Vocals (track 9)

== Album Credits ==
- Executive Producer: Sponge Cola, Raymund R. Fabul, Kathleen Dy-Go
- Track 2,6 & 10 Co Produced by: Yan Yuzon
- Engineered & Mixed By: Patrick Tirano
- Recorded at: Wombworks Studios Except "Nakapagtataka" Recorded at Sound Creation Studios by Shinji Tanaka
- Mastered By: Zach Lucero
- Additional Samples For "Nocturnal" Recorded at: Knives Studios
- Album Design & Concept by: Ginio & Sponge Cola
- CD Graphics, Artistic Direction: GOrio/Multimedia Productions
- Photography: Paolo Pineda
- Wardrobe: Guada Reyes
- Hair & Make Up: Cathy Cantada
