= Sponge Cola =

Filipino rock band

- Origin: Quezon City, Philippines
- Genres: OPM; alternative rock; pop rock; post-grunge (early)
- Years active: 2002–present
- Labels: Sony Music; Universal
- Members: Yael Yuzon; Gosh Dilay; Armo Armovit; Tedmark Cruz
- Past members: Chris Cantada

Sponge Cola (sometimes spelled Spongecola) is a Filipino rock band formed in 2002. The band is composed of Yael Yuzon on vocals and guitars, Gosh Dilay on bass, Armo Armovit on guitars and drummer Tedmark Cruz.

One of the most popular rock bands in the Philippines, Sponge Cola has produced a number of hit songs, including "Jeepney", "KLSP", "Gemini", "Bitiw", "Tuliro", "Di Na Mababawi", "Tambay", "Kay Tagal Kitang Hinintay", and "XGF". The band's debut album, Palabas, was released in 2004. It was followed by Transit (2006) and Sponge Cola (2008), the latter of which was the last to feature their original drummer Chris Cantada. The band has released a total of seven albums to date, as well as several extended plays (EPs). Their eighth full-length album, Hometown, was released on December 14, 2022.

== Formation and early years ==
The band formed between 1998 and 2002. Ysmael "Yael" Yuzon and Reynaldo "Gosh" Dilay, both from Ateneo de Manila High School, met through the school's theatre guild, Teatro Baguntao. Yuzon decided to form a band with Dilay and two other members of Teatro Baguntao. They named the group "Sponge", after R.S. Surtees' Mr. Sponge Sporting Tour, and the band won in several high school competitions, boosting their popularity on campuses.

After a couple of lineup changes, drummer Christopher "Chris" Cantada and Rampqueen guitarist Erwin "Armo" Armovit joined the band permanently. Later on, the band heard of a Detroit grunge band already using the name Sponge. "But we wanted to keep the word Sponge in our band name because people have already associated us with that name...so we decided to add 'Cola', since it's an easy enough word to remember," Yuzon said. Sponge Cola was officially formed in summer of 2003.

In the midst of touring the healthy local gig circuit during their senior year in high school, they released a 5-track, all-original, self-titled EP in 2003. It is from here that critics and music aficionados immediately took note of the songs "Lunes" (Monday) and "Jeepney", slowly creating a buzz in the Philippine underground music scene.

In the same year, the band performed a cover of Madonna's seminal classic "Crazy for You", a bootlegged copy of which was shared and downloaded immensely via peer-to-peer networks.

This, along with the EP, helped the band break into mainstream consciousness and popularity, gaining extensive airplay from several local pop and rock music radio stations.

== Career ==
=== Palabas and mainstream success (2004–2006) ===
In 2004, Sponge Cola signed a record distribution deal with Sony BMG Philippines and released their first full-length debut album entitled Palabas (The Show), an allusion to their roots in theatre. "KLSP", the album's lead single, further spread the band's name all over the Original Pilipino Music (OPM) market, gaining heavy airplay in local radio stations and music channels.

Other hits include the Shakespeare-inspired "Gemini", "Una" (The First), and a remastered "Jeepney", all hitting the number 1 spot in various music charts in the Philippines. This, along with a slew of other releases from other OPM bands, spearheaded the resurgence of Pinoy rock, and revitalized OPM as a whole.

After a subsequent repackaged release the following year, Palabas was certified Gold in 2005.

=== Transit (2006–2008) ===
The band's second full-length CD, Transit, was released in 2006 under Universal Records. The album was certified gold in less than four months after release, mainly due to the success of lead single "Bitiw" (Let Go), which enjoyed massive radio and television airplay. The song also became the theme song of the ABS-CBN television series Pedro Penduko. The album's second and third singles, "Tuliro" (Dumbfounded) and "Pasubali" (Conditions), were hits in their own right, and proved to be two of the band's most requested during their live sets.

Sponge Cola also contributed to three tribute albums. They recorded covers of the Eraserheads hit, "Pare Ko", on Ultraelectromagneticjam, and APO Hiking Society's classics "Nakapagtataka" and "Saan Na Nga Ba'ng Barkada" on the tribute albums Kami nAPO muna and Kami nAPO Muna ULIT respectively.

The band won four awards in the 2007 MYX Music Awards, besting other OPM acts in both the Favorite Artist and Favorite Group categories, while "Bitiw" was voted as both the Favorite Song and Favorite Rock Video. In the same year, ABS-CBN once again tapped Sponge Cola for the theme song of Pedro Penduko at ang mga Engkantao, "Tuloy Pa Rin". The band was also featured in the MYX show Myxellaneous, following their fast evolution from young upstarts to one of the more stellar acts in the Philippine rock music scene.

The single "Pasubali" was released in 2008, along with a deluxe edition of Transit, and was used as the theme song for ABS-CBN's airing of the Koreanovela Lovers. Transit's deluxe edition included a bonus AVCHD featuring "Tuloy Pa Rin", "Nakapagtataka", "Tuliro (Semi-Emo Version)", "Pasubali (Acoustic Version)", "Intercept", and "Pasubali (Radio Edit)". It also included the music videos of "Bitiw", "Nakapagtataka", "Tuliro", "Tuloy Pa Rin", "Movie", and "Pasubali", and hit platinum a week after release.

=== Self-titled album (2008–2010) ===
The band released their third album, the eponymous Sponge Cola, in September 2008. The self-titled record was a success both critically and commercially, led by the official theme song for Season 71 of the UAAP – "Puso" (Heart). The song would continue to be the league's anthem in the next four years. Other singles from the album included the massive hit "Di Na Mababawi" (You Can't Take it Back), "Wala Kang Katulad" (You Are Like No Other), "Makapiling Ka" (To Be With You), and "Ayt!" (a collaboration with Gary Valenciano). The band also re-recorded Gino Padilla's classic "Closer You and I" for Close-Up Toothpaste.

During the recording of the album, Chris Cantada left the band, citing the heavy touring as contributing to his health problems. A handful of drummers joined the band on tours, most notably Pupil's Wendell Garcia. By 2009, Tedmark "Tmac" Cruz signed on as the band's official drummer.

Sponge Cola became the first Philippine band to release its new album in mp3 and mp4 format. All songs, including those in past albums, were included in the music players launched on January 4, 2009, with "'Di Na Mababawi" on the variety show ASAP.

=== Tambay EP, Araw Oras Tagpuan, District EP (2010–2012) ===
In late 2011, the band released their fourth full-length studio album under Universal Records. Entitled Araw Oras Tagpuan (Day Time Setting), it contains 12 tracks, including songs from the band's Tambay (Hanging Out) EP, released earlier in 2010 via a Coca-Cola promo. The outstanding sales of Tambay and Araw Oras Tagpuan gave Sponge Cola a diamond record award as the latter sold over 200,000 units that summer. Araw Oras Tagpuan featured the lead single "Tambay", and following singles "Araw Oras Tagpuan", "Regal", "Kay Tagal Kitang Hinintay", and "Stargazer".

Former drummer Chris Cantada had a cameo guest appearance in the music video for "Tambay". Fran of RX 93.1, Kim Marvilla of defunct radio station NU 107, film director Wincy Aquino Ong, and singer Zia Quizon also appear in the said video, which, according to the band, pays homage to the film franchise Back to the Future.

In September of the following year, the band's six-track District EP was released, with lead single "XGF" featuring Parokya ni Edgar vocalist Chito Miranda and rapper Los Magno. Shortly after its release, "XGF" became the top download of MyMusicStore for seven weeks. Considered fresh and innovative, District also ruled the sales charts of local record store Odyssey upon release.

Other singles "Mahaba pa ang Gabi" (The Night is Young) and "Pick Your Poison" enjoyed success as well, and the latter was used for GMA Films' Metro Manila Film Festival entry Sosy Problems.

=== Ultrablessed and Thank You (2014–2016) ===
Sponge Cola released their fifth album, Ultrablessed, on January 31, 2014. The same day they release their first DVD concert called "Maximum Capacity" which was recorded last July 19, 2013. On February 14, 2015, a repackaged version of the album, the Ultrablessed "Thank You Edition", was released; this edition of the album includes the single "Move On", featuring Jane Oineza.

=== Sinag Tala (2016) ===
Following Ultrablessed, Sponge Cola released two EPs: #Sinag and #Tala. These were later combined into Sinag Tala, an 11-song LP that contains the singles Bahaghari and Butterflies, along with crowd favorites Coda and Pag-Ibig.

Pag-Ibig is the opening theme song of Dangwa, a romance drama series that aired on GMA from 2015 to 2016, and starred Janine Gutierrez.

=== Sea of Lights (2019) ===
Sponge Cola took to the road following the release of Sinag Tala, playing across The Philippines and abroad to promote their latest material. New songs were written throughout this two-year period, and the band were in and out of the studio again to work on what would become Sea of Lights. The band worked at Tower of Doom with Eric Perlas as producer.

Sea of Lights contains the singles Kunwari, Tempura, and Manila Bay.

=== Singles and upcoming album (2020–present) ===
After promoting Sea of Lights with another packed year of stadium and festival shows, the COVID-19 pandemic started in December 2019, grounding all live music to a halt. The band took a short break from touring and started spending more time writing new songs. The band had also just signed on to Sony Music Philippines so an album was on order.

Sponge Cola released Lumipas Ang Tag-Araw in July 2020, the first single from their upcoming album. The band recorded their parts at home separately, sending each other files until they had the song finished. According to Armo, "It's a story of connection in separation, and how we can be a source of comfort for each other during difficult times". The song is mixed and produced by Angee Rozul.

Following Lumipas Ang Tag-Araw (and with COVID-19 lockdowns in Manila lifted) the band went into the studio in August 2020 to write music together for their album. This time the boys worked with producer DJ Joey Santos at his Love One Another Sound Production studio, and in December 2020 they released Siguro Nga. Siguro Nga is a song inspired by the K-Drama Start Up starring Kim Seon-Ho and Bae Suzy.

The band continued to hammer away at new music, and in 2021 released the singles Labis-Labis and JAIRAH. JAIRAH was written by Agassi Ching for his then-girlfriend (now fiancee) Jai Asuncion. Yael liked it and helped produce the song, turning the track into a sunny 90s driving soundtrack.

Sponge Cola also released Alamat in late 2021, the theme song for the Mobile Legends 5th Anniversary celebration. The track fused an edgy electronica-meets-trap sound with the band's signature anthemic hooks. The music video features streaming celebrities Mika Salamanca, Akosi Dogie, Benedict Repaso, and more. Heartthrob Daniel Padilla also makes an appearance in the video.

In January 2022 the band released Kung Ako Ang Pumiling Tapusin Ito. The song was actually the first track that they worked on with DJ Joey Santos back in 2020, but it was only finished a year later. "Some songs need to simmer—to evolve and mature so they can reach their full potential. This is one such song. It benefitted from hindsight and just being able to go back and tweak instruments and refine production details," says Santos. The music video for Kung Ako Ang Pumiling Tapusin Ito features actress Heaven Peralejo.

== Members ==
Current members

- Yael Yuzon – lead vocals, guitars (1998–present)
- Gosh Dilay – bass guitar, backing vocals (1998–present)
- Armo Armovit – lead guitar, occasional backing vocals (1998–present)
- Tedmark Cruz – drums, percussion, occasional backing vocals (2009–present)

Early members

- Chris Cantada – drums, percussion, backing vocals, keyboards, synthesizer, additional guitars (1998–2008)

Touring substitutes

- Wendell Garcia – drums, percussion (2008–2009)
- Eo Marcos – drums
- Brian Sombero – guitar
- Oliver "Ole" Romblon – guitar
- Sid Buan - drums
- Paul Regalado - drums

== Discography ==
=== Albums ===
- Palabas (2004)
- Transit (2006)
- Sponge Cola (2008)
- Araw Oras Tagpuan (2011)
- Ultrablessed (2014)
- Sinag Tala (2016)
- Sea of Lights (2019)
- Hometown (2022)
- 8th Studio Album (2023)

=== EPs ===
- Sponge Cola EP (2003)
- Tambay EP (2011)
- District EP (2012)
- Sinag (2016)
- Tala (2016)

=== Compilations ===
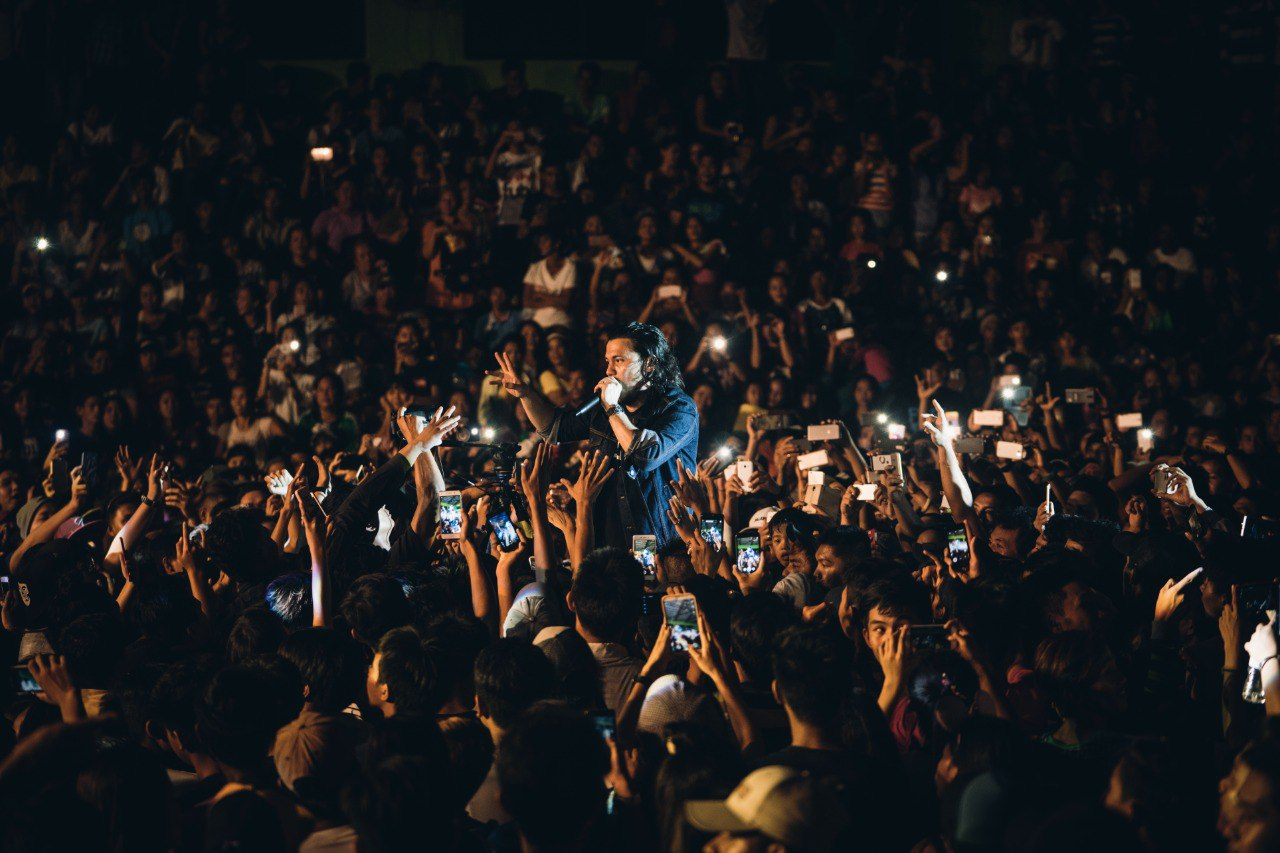
Sponge Cola performing in 2019

- Super Size Rock (Warner Music Philippines, 2003)
- Tunog Acoustic 3 (Warner Music Philippines, 2004)
- Ultraelectromagneticjam!: The Music Of The Eraserheads - "Pare Ko" (Sony BMG Music Philippines, 2005)
- Kami nAPO Muna - "Nakapagtataka" (Universal Records, 2006)
- Super! The Biggest Opm Hits Of The Year (Universal Records, 2006)
- Pinoy Biggie Hits Vol. 2 (Star Records, 2006)
- Kami nAPO Muna Ulit - "Saan Na Nga Ba Ang Barkada" (Universal Records, 2007)
- Level Up! The Album - "Intercept" (Star Records, 2007)
- Palabas: Best of OPM TV Themes (Universal Records, 2007)
- Astig...The Biggest Band Hits (Universal Records, 2008)
- Super Astig Hits (Universal Records, 2016)

=== Songs ===
- "Crazy for You" (2003)
- "Una" (2004)
- "KLSP" (2005)
- "Gemini" (2005)
- "Jeepney" (2005)
- "Pare Ko" (Original by Eraserheads) (2005)
- "Lunes" (2006)
- "Dragonfly" (2006, Internet only)
- "Nakapagtataka" (Original by APO Hiking Society) (2006)
- "Bitiw" (2006)
- "Tuliro" (2006)
- "Tuloy Pa Rin" (2007)
- "Saan Na Nga Ba'ng Barkada" (Original by APO Hiking Society) (2007)
- "Movie" (2007)
- "Pasubali" (2008)
- "Closer You And I" (Original by Gino Padilla) (2008)
- "Puso" (2008)
- "Di Na Mababawi" (2009)
- "Ayt!" (2009)
- "Wala Kang Katulad" (2009)
- "Makapiling Ka" (2010)
- "Tambay" (2011)
- "Regal" (2011)
- "Kay Tagal Kitang Hinintay" (2011)
- "Stargazer" (2012)
- "She Wants You To" (2012)
- "Araw Oras Tagpuan" (2012)
- "XGF" (Featuring Chito Miranda and Los Magnos) (2012)
- "Mahaba Pa Ang Gabi" (2012)
- "Pick Your Poison" (2013)
- "Segundo" (Himig Handog P-Pop Love Songs Entry) (2013)
- "Kailangan Kita" (2013)
- "Anting-Anting" (featuring Gloc-9 and Denise Barbacena) (2014)
- "Singapore Sling (Dahil Kilala Na Kita)" (2014)
- "+63" (featuring Yeng Constantino) (2014)
- "Move On" (featuring Jane Oineza) (2015)
- "Walk Away" (2015)
- "Iyong-Iyong-Iyo" (2015)
- "Pag-Ibig" (2016)
- "Coda" (2016)
- "Bahaghari" (2016)
- "Tempura" (2019)
- "Kunwari" (2019)
- "Phantoms" (2019)
- "Paliyabin Na Ang Lahat" (2019)
- "Lumipas Ang Tag-Araw" (2020)
- "Siguro Nga" (2020)
- "Labis-Labis" (2021)
- "JAIRAH" (2021)
- "Alamat" (2021)
- "Kung Ako Ang Pumiling Tapusin Ito" (2022)
- "Laman Ng Panaginip" (2022)
- "Hometown" (2022)
- "Tatlong Buwan" (2024)
- "Isang Tugon" (2024)
- "Kelly" (2024)
- "Liwanag" (2025)

== Awards and nominations ==
Year	Award giving body	Category	Nominated work	Results
2004	99.5 RT	Song of the Year	"KLSP"	Won
2004	NU Rock Awards	Rising Sun Award	—N/a	Won
2004	RX 93.1	Independent Artist of the Year	—N/a	Won
2005	NU Rock Awards	Best Male Award	for Yael Yuzon	Won
2006	ASAP Pop Viewer's Choice	Pop Band of The Year	—N/a	Won
2006	Awit Awards	Music Video of the Year	"Gemini"	Nominated
2006	MTV Pilipinas Video Music Awards	Favorite New Artist in a Video	"Una"	Nominated
2006	MYX Music Awards	Favorite Rock Video	"KLSP"	Won
2006	MYX Music Awards	Favorite Music Video	"Gemini"	Nominated
2006	MYX Music Awards	Favorite Song	"Gemini"	Nominated
2006	MYX Music Awards	Favorite New Artist	—N/a	Nominated
2006	NU Rock Awards	Music Video of The Year	"Bitiw"	Nominated
2006	SOP Music Awards	Revival '06	"Pare Ko"	Nominated
2006	SOP Pasiklaband	Best Rock Song	"Jeepney"	Nominated
2006	SOP Pasiklaband	Best Revival	"Pare Ko"	Nominated
2007	ASAP Pop Viewer's Choice	Pop Band of The Year	—N/a	Won
2007	Awit Awards	Best Performance by a Group	—N/a	Nominated
2007	Awit Awards	Album of the Year	Transit	Nominated
2007	Awit Awards	Best Selling Album of the Year	Transit	Nominated
2007	Awit Awards	Best Album Packaging	Transit	Nominated
2007	Awit Awards	Music Video of the Year	"Bitiw"	Nominated
2007	MYX Music Awards	Favorite Song	"Bitiw"	Won
2007	MYX Music Awards	Favorite Rock Video	"Bitiw"	Won
2007	MYX Music Awards	Favorite Artist	—N/a	Won
2007	MYX Music Awards	Favorite Group	—N/a	Won
2007	MYX Music Awards	Favorite Music Video	"Bitiw"	Nominated
2007	MYX Music Awards	Favorite Remake	"Nakapagtataka"	Nominated
2007	NU Rock Awards	Drummer of the Year	for Chris Cantada	Nominated
2007	OPM Songhits Awards	Best Male Vocalist	Yael Yuzon	Won
2007	OPM Songhits Awards	Pinoy Magazine Brand Award	—N/a	Won
2008	ASAP Pop Viewer's Choice	Pop Band of The Year	—N/a	Won
2008	MYX Music Awards	Favorite Media Soundtrack	Tuloy Pa Rin	Won
2008	MYX Music Awards	Favorite Group	—N/a	Won
2008	MYX Music Awards	Favorite Music Video	"Tuliro"	Won
2008	MYX Music Awards	Favorite Artist	—N/a	Nominated
2008	NU Rock Awards	Song of the Year	"Pasubali"	Nominated
2009	ASAP Pop Viewer's Choice	Best Performance in a Music Video	"Di Na Mababawi"	Won
2009	GMMSF Box-Office Entertainment Awards	Most Popular Recording Group	—N/a	Won
2010	MYX Music Awards	Favorite Group	—N/a	Won
2012	Awit Awards	Favorite Performance by a Group	—N/a	Nominated
2012	Awit Awards	Song of the Year		Nominated
2012	Awit Awards	Album of the Year		Nominated
2012	Awit Awards	Best Rock/Alternative Recording		Nominated
2012	GMMSF Box-Office Entertainment Awards	Most Popular Recording/Performing Group	—N/a	Won
2012	MYX Music Awards	Favorite Mellow Video	"Kay Tagal Kitang Hinintay"	Won
2012	MYX Music Awards	Favorite Song	"XGF"	Nominated
2012	PMPC Star Awards for Music	Album of the Year	Araw Oras Tagpuan	Won
2012	PMPC Star Awards for Music	Male Rock Artist of the Year	—N/a	Won
2014	PMPC Star Awards for Music	Rock Album of the Year	Ultrablessed	Won
2014	PMPC Star Awards for Music	Rock artist of the Year	—N/a	Won
2015	Wish 107.5 Music Awards	Wish Alternative Song of the Year	"Move On"	Won
2019	PMPC Star Awards for Music	Album of the Year	Sea of Lights	Nominated
2024	Wish 107.5 Music Awards	Wishclusive Collaboration of the Year	"So Close" (Note: Received ₱100 thousand for their beneficiaries, the Cancer Treatment And Support Foundation and the Philippine Educational Theater Association.) (with Morissette)	Won
