= Sponge Cola (album) =

Studio album by Sponge Cola
- Released: September 19, 2008
- Genre: Pinoy rock
- Length: 58:00
- Label: Universal Records
- Producer: Patrick Tirano; Sponge Cola; Yan Yuzon

Sponge Cola chronology
Transit (2006)	Sponge Cola (2008)	Tambay (2011)

Singles from Sponge Cola
- 1. "Puso" Released: September 17, 2008; 2. "Di Na Mababawi" Released: January 5, 2009; 3. "Ayt!" Released: June 23, 2009; 4. "Wala Kang Katulad" Released: November 1, 2009; 5. "Makapiling Ka" Released: February 12, 2010

Sponge Cola is the self-titled third studio album by the Pinoy rock band Sponge Cola. Under Universal Records, Sponge Cola is already out in all major record bars. This was the last album to feature original drummer Chris Cantada who left the band following the release of the album due to a health problem.

"Puso" is the first single from the album and is frequently heard after games during the UAAP Broadcast on Studio 23 as it was selected as the theme song for season 71. Their 2nd single "Di Na Mababawi", marked the band's departure from the standard full band rock formula, opting for simpler instrumentation. They then released the repackaged version of this album along with the 3rd single Ayt. The new version of the song featured Gary Valenciano on vocals and synths. This is essentially the band's first dance song. Sponge Cola then released their 4th single Wala Kang Katulad and then released their 5th single Makapiling Ka.

On 2009, a repackaged album of their 3rd album was released with a 2nd disc with 4 new and updated songs.

== Track listing ==
No.	Title	Length
1.	"Ayt!"	3:31
2.	"Puso ("Heart")"	3:56
3.	"Step Back"	3:18
4.	"Di Na Mababawi ("Will Never Be Recovered")"	3:13
5.	"In Another Life"	4:36
6.	"G.K.T."	3:24
7.	"A Tear"	4:41
8.	"All The Time"	2:59
9.	"Wala Kang Katulad ("You're Incomparable")"	4:10
10.	"Makapiling Ka ("To be With You")"	4:06
11.	"Lights"	3:57
12.	"Meteor Shower"	4:47
13.	"Saturn"	4:58
14.	"Keep the Fire Burning"	6:32

== Repackaged Album ==
Bonus Disc
No.	Title	Length
1.	"Ayt(Featuring Gary V.)"	4:25
2.	"Closer you & I"	2:32
3.	"Di Na Mababawi(Band Version)"	3:49
4.	"Puso(Bonfire version)"	7:04

== Credits ==
Sponge Cola

- Yael Yuzon - vocals, rhythm guitar
- Gosh Dilay - bass guitar
- Erwin Armovit - lead guitar
- Chris Cantada - drums, backup vocals

== In popular culture ==
- "Puso" was used as boxer Nesthy Petecio's entrance music during her semifinals and finals bouts at the 2020 Summer Olympics in Tokyo.
