= 2nd PMPC Star Awards for Music =

- Date: October 10, 2010
- Venue: Henry Irwin Lee Theater; Ateneo de Manila University, Quezon City
- Hosted by: Kuh Ledesma; Jolina Magdangal; Christian Bautista

The 2nd PMPC Star Awards for Music by the Philippine Movie Press Club (PMPC), honored the best Filipino music of 2009. The ceremony took place on October 10, 2010, in Henry Irwin Lee Theater, Ateneo de Manila University, Quezon City.

The PMPC Star Awards for Music was hosted by Kuh Ledesma, Jolina Magdangal and Christian Bautista. A delayed telecast for the award ceremony was broadcast by Net 25 on October 24, 2010.

== Winners and nominees ==
The following are the nominations for the 2nd PMPC Star Awards for Music, covering music released in 2009.

Winners are listed first and indicated in bold.

=== Major categories ===
Album of the Year	Song of the Year
**"Lapit" – Yeng Constantino (Star Records)**; "Callalily" – Callalily (Sony Music Philippines); "KC" – KC Concepcion (Sony Music Philippines); "Maharlika" – Kenyo (Universal Records); "Now Playing" – Juris (Star Records); "Project 6 Cyclemind" – 6cyclemind (Star Records)	**"Pusong Ligaw" – Jericho Rosales from the album "Change" (Star Records)**; "Di Lang Ikaw" – Juris from the album "Now Playing" (Star Records; "Hanggang Sa Muli" – Kenyo from the album "Maharlika" (Universal Records); "Lapit" – Yeng Constantino from the album "Lapit" (Star Records); "Nananaginip" – Callalily from the album "Callalily" (Sony Music Philippines)
Male Recording Artist of the Year	Female Recording Artist of the Year
**Christian Bautista – Romance Revisited: The Love Songs of Jose Mari Chan (Universal Records); and**; **Erik Santos – "The Jim Brickman Songbook" (Star Records) (tied)**; Gary Valenciano – "As 1" (Universal Records); Gino Padilla – "Let Me Be The One" (Vicor Records); Martin Nievera – "As Always" (PolyEast Records); Noel Cabangon – "Byahe" (Universal Records); Piolo Pascual – "Decades" (Star Records)	**Sarah Geronimo – "Music and Me" (Viva Records)**; Aiza Seguerra – "Aiza Seguerra Live" (Star Records); KC Concepcion – "KC" (Sony Music Philippines); Jaya – "Real Love Stories" (GMA Records); Joey Albert – "Songs of the Heart" (Viva Records); Nina – "Renditions of the Soul" (Warner Music Philippines); Rachel Alejandro – "Believe" (Sony Music Philippines); Yeng Constantino – "Lapit" (Star Records)
New Male Recording Artist of the Year	New Female Recording Artist of the Year
**Rhap Salazar – "Rhap Salazar" (Star Records)**; Aljur Abrenica – "Aljur Abrenica" (GMA Records and Sony Music Philippines); Bryan Termulo – "Bryan Begins" (BWB Records and Music); Charlie Green – "A Friend Like You/" (Viva Records); Kid Camaya – "Soul Session" (Ivory Music); Davey Langit – "Mad About Acoustic" (Viva Records); Geoff Taylor – "Frencheska-Geoff" (GMA Records)	**Princess Velasco – "Addicted To Acoustic 1" Vicor Records**; Carol Leus – "Carol Leus" (Sunrays Music); Frencheska Farr – "Frencheska-Geoff" (GMA Records); Gretchen Espina – "Shining Through" (Sony Music Philippines); Hanna Flores – "Hanna Flores" / (Star Records)
Duo/Group of the Year	Music Video of the Year
**La Diva – "La Diva" (GMA Records and Sony Music Philippines)**; Eurasia – "Eurasia" (Viva Records); Freestyle – "Playlist" (Viva Records); The Company – "Lighthearted" (Viva Records); True Faith – "Love and Parade" (Viva Records); Side A – "Only One" (MCA Music Inc.); XLR8 – "XLR8" (Viva Records)	**"Kasiping" – La Diva (GMA Records and Sony Music Philippines)**; **Louie Ignacio, director**; "Babe" – Piolo Pascual (Star Records); Mae Cruz, director; "Beautiful Girl" – Christian Bautista (Universal Records); Treb Monteras II, director; "Because of You" – Sabrina (MCA-Universal Records); Treb Monteras II, director; "Kahit Maputi Na Ang Buhok Ko" – Noel Cabangon (Universal Records); Louie Ignacio, director; "Pusong Ligaw" – Jericho Rosales (Star Records); Mark Ocampo, director; "Why Can't It Be" – Gino Padilla (Vicor Records); Marla Ancheta, director
Dance Video of the Year	
**"Supahdance 2" – Various artists (Star Records)**	

=== Pop category ===
Pop Album of the Year	Male Pop Artist of the Year
**"The Jim Brickman Songbook" – Erik Santos (Star Records)**; "As Always" – Martin Nievera (PolyEast Records); "Aiza Seguerra Live" – Aiza Seguerra (Star Records); "As 1" – Gary Valenciano (Universal Records); "Music and Me" – Sarah Geronimo (Viva Records); "Renditions of the Soul" – Nina (Warner Music Philippines); "Romance Revisited: The Love Songs of Jose Mari Chan" – Christian Bautista (Universal Records)	**Erik Santos – "The Jim Brickman Songbook" (Star Records)**; Christian Bautista – "Romance Revisited: The Love Songs of Jose Mari Chan" (Universal Records); DJ Myke – "Homework" (Ivory Music); Gary Valenciano – "As 1" (Universal Records and PolyEast Records); Martin Nievera – "As 1" (Universal Records and PolyEast Records); Jericho Rosales –"Change" (Star Records); Piolo Pascual – "Decades" (Star Records)
Female Pop Artist of the Year	
**Nina – Renditions of the Soul (Warner Music Philippines)**; KC Concepcion – "KC" (Sony Music Philippines); Jaya – "Real. Love. Stories" (GMA Records; Jennylyn Mercado – "Love Is.." (Viva Records); Rachel Alejandro – "Believe" (Sony Music Philippines); Roselle Nava – "Forever Love Songs" (Viva Records); Sarah Geronimo – "Music and Me" (Viva Records)	

=== Rock, RnB, Rap and Acoustic category ===
Rock Album of the Year	Rock Artist of the Year
**"In Love and War" – Francis Magalona and Ely Buendia (Sony Music Philippines);**; **"Lapit" – Yeng Constantino (Star Records); and**; **"Mornings and Airports" – Sugarfree (PolyEast Records) (tied)**; "Callalily" – Callalily (Sony Music Philippines); "Cariño Brutal" – Slapshock (PolyEast Records); "Project 6 Cyclemind" – 6cyclemind/ (Sony Music Philippines); "Sponge Cola" – Sponge Cola (Universal Records)	**Slapshock – "Cariño Brutal" (PolyEast Records)**; 6cyclemind – "Project 6 Cyclemind" (Sony Music Philippines); Callalily – "Callalily" (Sony Music Philippines); Rivermaya – "Closest Thing to Heaven" (Warner Music Philippines); Sponge Cola – "Sponge Cola" (Universal Records); Sugarfree –"Morning and Airports" (PolyEast Records); Yeng Constantino – "Lapit" (Star Records)
RnB Album of the Year	RnB Artist of the Year
	**Jay R – "Jay R Sings OPM Love Classics" (Universal Records)**; Amber Davis – "Filam" (Viva Records); Kris Lawrence – "Moments of Love" (MCA Music Inc.)
Rap Album of the Year	Rap Artist of the Year
**"Chika Lang 'Yon" – Blanktape (Alpha Records); and**; **"Clubzilla" – Andrew E. (Dongalo Wreckords) (tied)**; "Bagsakan Na'to" – Dagtang Lason (Ivory Music); "Matrikula" – Gloc-9 (Sony Music Philippines); "Ready or Not" – Young JV (PolyEast Records)	**Blanktape – "Chika Lang 'Yon" (Alpha Records)**; Andrew E. – "Clubzilla" (Dongalo Wreckords); Dagtang Lason – "Bagsakan Na'to" (Ivory Music); Gloc-9 – "Matrikula" (Sony Music Philippines); Young JV – "Ready or Not" (PolyEast Records)
Acoustic Album of the Year	Acoustic Artist of the Year
**"Aiza Seguerra Live" – Aiza Seguerra (Star Records)**; "Addicted To Acoustic 2" – Princess Velasco (Vicor Music); "I Love Acoustic Too" – Sabrina (MCA Music Inc.); "Lighthearted" – The Company (Viva Records); "Mad About Acoustic" – Davey Langit (Viva Records); "Intimately Acoustic" – Miki Hahn (Viva Records); "Renditions of the Soul" – Nina (Warner Music Philippines)	**Aiza Seguerra – "Aiza Seguerra Live" (Star Records);**; **Sabrina – "I love Acoustic Too" (MCA Music Inc.); and**; **Chris Cayzer – "The Only Thing" (Warner Music Philippines) (tied)**; Miki Hahn – "Intimately Acoustic" (Viva Records); Nina – "Renditions of the Soul" (Warner Music Philippines); Princess Velasco – "Addicted to Acoustic 2" (Vicor Music); Suy – "Simply Suy" (Ivory Music); Davey Langit – "Mad About Acoustic" (Viva Records); Toto Sorioso – "Totoismo" (MCA Music Inc.)

=== Novelty and jazz category ===
Novelty Album of the Year	Novelty Song of the Year
**"Masculados Dos" – Masculados Dos (Universal Records)**; "Hey Tambalan Na (D' Nakakalurkei Na Album)" – Nicole Hyala and Chris Tsuper (Ivory Music); "I've Got The Power" – Mystica (Mystica Productions and Viva Records); "The Return of The Horseback" – Richie D'Horsie (Warner Music Philippines); "Sino Ba?" – Blakdyak (Viva Records)	**"Nagmahal Ako ng Bakla" – Dagtang Lason (Ivory Music)**; "Mahal Kita Kasi" – Nicole Hyala (Ivory Music); "May Ganun?" – Mr. Fu (Warner Music Philippines); "Sino Ba?" – Blakdyak (Viva Records)
Novelty Artist of the Year	Jazz Artist of the Year
**Blakdyak – "Sino Ba?" (Viva Records)**; Nicole Hyala and Chris Tsuper – "Hey Tambalan Na (D' Nakakalurkei Na Album)" (Ivory Music); Masculados Dos – "Masculados Dos" (Universal Records); Mystica – "I've Got The Power" (Mystica Productions and Viva Records); Richie D'Horsie – "The Return of The Horseback" (Warner Music Philippines)	**Charlie Green – "A Friend Like You" (Viva Records)**; Charmaine Clamor – "Jazzi Pino" (Viva Records)

=== Album category ===
Album Cover Design of the Year	Revival Album of the Year
**"Decades" – Piolo Pascual (Star Records)**; "As Always" – Martin Nievera (PolyEast Records); "Aiza Seguerra Live" – Aiza Seguerra (Star Records); "As 1" – Gary Valenciano and Martin Nievera (Universal Records and PolyEast Records); "Change" – Jericho Rosales (Star Records); "The Jim Brickman Songbook" – Erik Santos (Star Records); "KC" – KC Concepcion (Sony Music Philippines); "Homework" – DJ Myke (Ivory Music); "White Lace and Promises" – Agot Isidro (PolyEast Records)	**"Decades" – Piolo Pascual (Star Records)**; "As 1" – Gary Valenciano and Martin Nievera (Universal Records and PolyEast Records); "Aiza Seguerra Live" – Aiza Seguerra (Star Records); "As Always" – Martin Nievera (PolyEast Records); "Byahe" – Noel Cabangon (Universal Records); "Renditions of the Soul" – Nina (Warner Music Philippines); "Romance Revisited: The Love Songs of Jose Mari Chan" – Christian Bautista (Universal Records)
Compilation Album of the Year	
**"The Best of Mga Awit Kapuso" – Various artists (GMA Records)**; "Blessings of Love" – Kris Aquino (Universal Records); "Greatest Love" – Kris Aquino (Universal Records); "Paalam, Maraming Salamat (A Memorial Tribute)" – Various artists (Star Records); "Sa'yo Lamang" – Various artists (Star Records); "Senti 1" – Various artists (Viva Records); "Back 2 Back" – Side A and Freestyle (Viva Records)	

Note: There were no entries for RnB Album of the Year and Alternative Album of the Year.

=== Special awards ===
- Lifetime Achievement Awards: Pilita Corrales
- Male Face of the Night: Jericho Rosales
- Female Face of the Night: Sarah Geronimo
- Male Star of the Night: Piolo Pascual
- Female Star of the Night: KC Concepcion
