= 13th PMPC Star Awards for Music =

- Date: October 12, 2022
- Venue: Newport Performing Arts Theater, Pasay City
- Hosted by: Ciara Sotto; RS Francsico; Tessa Prieto-Valdes

The 13th PMPC Star Awards for Music by the Philippine Movie Press Club (PMPC), honored the best Filipino music of 2020. The ceremony took place on October 12, 2022 in Newport Performing Arts Theater, Pasay City

The PMPC Star Awards for Music was hosted by Ciara Sotto, RS Francisco and Tessa Prieto-Valdes

== Winners and nominees ==
The following are the nominations for the 13th PMPC Star Awards for Music, covering music released in 2020.

Winners are listed first and indicated in bold.

=== Major categories ===
Album of the Year	Song of the Year
**"Patawad – Moira Dela Torre (Star Music)**; "Himig Handog: 11th Edition" – Various artists (Star Music); "Huwag Matakot" – This Band (Viva Records); "Songbook" – Rico Blanco (Viva Records); "Umaga Live" – The Juans and Janine Teñoso (Viva Records); "Unplugged" Imago (Universal Records); "Wildest Dreams – Nadine Lustre (Careless Music)	**"Paubaya" – Moira Dela Torre (Star Music)**; "Binibini" – Matthaios feat. Calvin de Leon (Midas Records); "Di Ka Sayang" – Ben&Ben (Sony Music Philippines); "Magandang Dilag" – JM Bales (Empire Philippines and Star Music); "Marikit" – Juan Caoile and Kyleswish (Viva Records); "Marupok" – KZ Tandingan (Star Music); "Pati Pato" – Parokya ni Edgar, Gloc-9, and Shanti Dope (Universal Records)
Male Recording Artist of the Year	Female Recording Artist of the Year
**Christian Bautista – "Bukas Wala Nang Ulan" (Universal Records)**; Alden Richards – "Goin Crazy" (GMA Music); Arnel Pineda – "Your Soldiers" (Star Music); Ebe Dancel – "Wag Mong Aminin" (Viva Records); Erik Santos – "Walang Hanggang Paalam" (Star Music); Martin Nievera – "Di Na Muli" (Vicor Music); Piolo Pascual – "Iiyak sa Ulan" (Star Music)	**Moira Dela Torre – "Paubaya" (Star Music)**; Aicelle Santos – "Bilangin Ang Bituin Sa Langit" (GMA Music); Ima Castro – "This Little Child" (Trina Belamide Music); Julie Anne San Jose – "Bahaghari" (Universal Records); KZ Tandingan – "Marupok" (Star Music); Morissette – "Love You Still" (Underdog Music Philippines); Regine Velasquez – "Mahal Ko O Mahal Ako" (Star Music)
New Male Recording Artist of the Year	New Female Recording Artist of the Year
**Jeremiah Tiangco – "Titulo" (GMA Music)**; CJ Villavicencio – "Kulang Na Kulang" (Viva Records); John Arcenas – "A Single Smile" (Believe Music); John Gabriel – "O Pilipina" (BMW8 Entertainment Art and Services); Kokoy De Santos – "Lagi Lagi" (Star Music); Rich Patawaran – "Bumibitiw Ka Na" (Vehnee Saturno Music); Rob Deniel – "Ulap" (Viva Records); Vance Larena – "Tama" (Star Music)	**Christi Fider – "Teka Teka Teka" (Star Music)**; Bianca Umali – "Kahit Kailan" (GMA Music); Charo Laude – "Himalay Laganap" (Alakdan Records); Edsel of Ppop Generation – "Dumating Ka Na" (Viva Records); Hannah Precillas – "Sabi Ko Na Nga Ba" (GMA Music); Heaven Peralejo – "Ikaw Pala" (Star Music); Maine Mendoza – "Parang Kailan Lang" (Universal Records)
Duo/Group of the Year	New Group of the Year
**Ben&Ben – "'Di Ka Sayang" (Sony Music Philippines)**; Agsunta – "Sa Huling Pagkikita" (Star Music); December Avenue – "Bakas ng Talampakan" (Tower of Doom Records); Sandiwa – "Tulong" (Ivory Music); The Company – "Sumakabilang Puso" (Star Music); True Faith – "Your Ready Smile" (Viva Records); XOXO – "XOXO" (GMA Music)	**Bandang Lapis – "Kabilang Buhay" (Viva Records)**; Emotikons – "Dudera" (Star Music); JThree – "Love Kita, Maniwala Ka" (Viva Records); Kiss N Tell – "Pahina" (Star Music); Nameless Kids – "Outlaws" (Star Music); The Knobs – "Paalam" (Universal Records)
Music Video of the Year	
**"Paubaya" – Moira Dela Torre (Star Music)**; **Niq Ablao, director**; "A Trilogy: Patawad Paalam, Paalam, and Patawad" – Moira Dela Torre feat. I Belong to the Zoo and Ben&Ben (Star Music); Niq Ablao, director; "Alab (Burning)" – SB19 (Sony Music Philippines); "Di Ka Sayang" – Ben&Ben (Sony Music Philippines); Jorel Lising, director; "Love You Still" – Morissette (Underdog Music Philippines); Jason Max, director; "Parang Kailan Lang" – Maine Mendoza (Universal Records); Treb Maano, director; "Try Love Again" – Julie Anne San Jose (Universal Records); Mellan Bernardino, director	

=== Pop category ===
Pop Album of the Year	Male Pop Artist of the Year
**"Wildest Dreams – Nadine Lustre (Careless Music**; "Distanced" – Timmy Albert (Universal Records); "Heartbreak" – Because (Viva Records); "Huwag Matakot" – This Band (Viva Records); "Purple Afternoon" – Paolo Sandejas (Universal Records); "Songbook" – Rico Blanco (Universal Records); "Umaga Live!" – The Juans (Viva Records)	**Iñigo Pascual – "Lost" (Star Music)**; Darren Espanto – "Sana Tayo Na" (Star Music); Erik Santos – "Walang Hanggang Paalam" (Star Music); Marlo Mortel – "Blue" (Marlowel Music); Ruru Madrid – "Maghihintay" (GMA Music); Sam Concepcion – "Loved You Better" (Star Music); The Juans – "Pangalawang Bitaw" (Viva Records)
Female Pop Artist of the Year	
**Jayda Avanzado – "Sana Tayo Na" (Star Music)**; Esang De Torres – "This Feeling" (Vehnee Saturno Music); Janine Teñoso – "Kahit Anong Mangyari" (Viva Records); Julie Anne San Jose – "Try Love Again" (Universal Records); Kim Chiu – "Bawal Lumabas" (Star Music); Marion Aunor – "Kahit Anong Mangyari" (Viva Records); Maymay Entrata – "I Love You" (Star Music)	

=== Rock, Rap, RnB and Acoustic category ===
Rock Album of the Year	Rock Artist of the Year
**"Kaimerah" – Kaimerah (Ivory Music)**; "EP2: The After Party" – The Cokeheads (Ivory Music); "Self Induced Trance" – Ignatius Coloma (Ivory Music)	**Agsunta – "Sa Huling Pagkikita" (Star Music); and**; **Cool Cat Ash – "Diyosa ng Kaseksihan' (Viva Records) (tied)**; Aegis – "Ang Sa Iyo Ay Akin" (Star Music); Arnel Pineda – "Your Soldiers" (Star Music); Bloodflowers – "Sana" (Ivory Music); Sandiwa – "Tulong" (Ivory Music); Unit 406 – "Tala" (Star Music)
RnB Album of the Year	RnB Male Artist of the Year
**"Better Weather" – Leila Alcasid (Star Music)**; "Init ng Gabi" – Bryant (Star Music); "Tsansa" – JKris (Universal Records)	**Garth Garcia – "Kick It" (Ivory Music); and**; **JV Decena – "Paano Ba?" (Believe Music Media Sync Production) (tied)**; Bryant – "Init ng Gabi" (Star Music); JMKO | Bakit Pa Ba- Star Music; Rich Patawaran – "Bumibitaw Ka Na" Vehnee Saturno Music); Sam Concepcion – "Thrill of It" (Star Music); Tank B Music – "Life" (Ivory Music)
RnB Female Artist of the Year	Inspirational Song of the Year
**Kiana Valenciano – "Corners" (Star Music)**; Fana – "Out" (Star Music); Kyrill – "Gunita" (GMA Music); Lirah – "Bakit Hindi" (Ivory Music); Vera – "Baby" (Star Music)	**"Ihip ng Hangin" – Sarah Javier (Independent)**; "Beautiful" – Ogie Alcasid and Moira Dela Torre (Star Music); "Habangbuhay – Noel Cabangon, Leanne and Naara (Universal Records); "Heal" – Various artists (Star Music); "Live For Jesus" – Ogie Alcasid, Regine Velasquez, Gary Gotidoc and Jaya (Star Music); "Tulong" – Sandiwa and Gloc-9 (Ivory Music); "We Are Here" – Christian Bautista and Delon (Universal Records)
Rap Album of the Year	Rap Artist of the Year
**"Heartbreak Szn 2" – Because (Viva Records)**; "This Is Us" – Allmo$t (Viva Records)	**Juan Caoile – "Marikit" (Viva Records)**; Aikee – "Mapa" (Warner Music Philippines); Kritiko – "Amazak" (Star Music); Lil Vincey – "Chinita Girl" (Vehnee Saturno Music); Matthaios – "Binibini" (Midas Records); Pio Balbuena – "Ikaw Pa Rin" (Viva Records); Takayuki Sakamoto – "Want It To" (Viva Records)
Male Acoustic Artist of the Year	Female Acoustic Artist of the Year
**Marlo Mortel – "Blue" (Marlowe Music)**; Bryan Chong – "Takipsilim" (GMA Music); Dan Ombao – "Muling Maramdaman" (Star Music); Jem Macatuno – "LDR" (Star Music)	**Jos Garcia – "Nagpapanggap" (Viva Records)**; Acel Bisa – "Lagi Na Lang" (Star Music); Janine Teñoso – "Umiibig Muli" (Viva Records); Meg Zurbito – "Salamat" (Ivory Music); Trishia Denise – "Ika'y Mamahalin" (Star Music)
Folk/Country Recording of the Year	Collaboration of the Year
**"Dungo" –Davey Langit (Star Music)**; "Bulalakaw" – Janine Berdin and Joanna Ang (Star Music); "Habangbuhay" Noel Cabangon, and Leanne and Naara (Universal Records); "Hinulog Lang" – Noel Bernaldo (Vehnee Saturno Music); "Dili Pwede" – Kervin Kane (Star Music); "Pipiliin Pang Maghintay" – Noel Cabangon (Universal Records)	**"Beautiful" – Ogie Alcasid and Moira Dela Torre (Star Music)**; "Sana Tayo Na" – Darren Espanto and Jayda Avanzado (Star Music); "Bahaghari" – Gloc-9 and Julie Anne San Jose (Universal Records); "Tayo Hanggang Dulo" – JaMill (Star Music); "Kahit Anong Mangyari" – Janine Teñoso and Marion Aunor (Viva Records); "Ikaw Pa Rin" – Moira Dela Torre and Erik Santos (Star Music); "Iiyak sa Ulan" – Piolo Pascual and Yeng Constantino (Star Music)

=== Novelty category ===
Novelty Song of the Year	Novelty Artist of the Year
**"Bawal Lumabas" – Kim Chiu (Star Music)**; "Corona Bye Bye Na" – Vice Ganda (Star Music); "Diyosa ng Kaseksihan" – Cool Cat Ash (Viva Records); "GGSS" – Diday Ong (Vehnee Saturno Music); "Lumaban Ka" – Gari Escobar (Ivory Music); "Nang Minahal Mo Ang Mahal Ko" – Betong Sumaya (GMA Music); "Sabi Ko Na Nga Ba" – Hannah Precillas (GMA Music)	**Kim Chiu – "Bawal Lumabas" (Star Music)**; Betong Sumaya – "Nang Minahal Mo Ang Mahal Ko" (GMA Music); Gari Escobar – "Lumaban Ka" (Ivory Music); KJ Reyes – "Tagay Na" (KJ Ng Pilipinas Music Productions); Vice Ganda – "Corona Bye Bye Na" (Star Music)

=== Album category ===
Dance Album of the Year	Revival Album of the Year
**"Sana All" – Ivana Alawi (Star Music)**; "Huwag Kang Bibitaw" – Kim Chiu (Star Music); "Isa Dalawa Tatlo" – Kyline Alcantara (GMA Music); "I'm Serious" – Kyle Echarri (Star Music); "Marikit" – Juan Caoile and Kyleswish (Viva Records); "Sa'yo Lang" – Enchong Dee (Star Music); "White Rabbit" – Nadine Lustre (Careless Music)	**"Malaya" – Noel Cabangon (Universal Records)**; "Ikaw Nga" – Princess Velasco (GMA Music); "Mahal Ko O Mahal Ako" – Regine Velasquez (Star Music); "Sa Aking Panaginip" – Maricris Garcia (GMA Music); "Simpleng Tao" – Zephanie (Star Music); "This I Promise You" – Christian Bautista (Universal Records); "Walang Hanggang Paalam" – Ice Seguerra (Universal Records)
Compilation Album of the Year	
**"Unplugged" – Imago (Universal Records)**; "Himig Handog 11th Edition – Various artists (Star Music); "Kaibigan" – Troy Laureta (Star Music); "Mga Awit Kapuso Vol. 11" – Various artists (GMA Music)	

=== Concert category ===
Concert of the Year	Male Concert Performer of the Year
**Unified – Regine Velasquez and Sarah Geronimo (Viva Live Inc.)**; 1 for 3 Concert – Christian Bautista, Mark Bautista, and Aicelle Santos (Solaire Resort & Casino and PLDT Home); A Night At the Theatre – Ely Buendia (Full House Theatre Company and Resorts World Manila); And The Story Begins – Ryan Cayabyab, Basil Valdez, and Lani Misalucha (CCC Productions and Resort World Manila); Apollo: A Daniel Padilla Digital Experience – Daniel Padilla (Star Events); Co Love Concert – Jennylyn Mercado and Dennis Trillo (Quantum Films, GMA Network, and Becky Aguila Entertainment); TwoTogether Again – Martin Nievera and Pops Fernandez (Star Media Entertainment, DSL and Solaire Resort & Casino)	**Daniel Padilla – Apollo: A Daniel Padilla Digital Experience (Star Events); and**; **Ogie Alcasid – Kilabotitos (A Team and Frontrow International) (tied)**; Alden Richards – Alden's Reality (GMA Network and Synergy); Arnel Pineda – Let It Love Let It Rock Concert (ABU EMP Entertainment Productions); Christian Bautista – 1 for 3 Concert (Solaire Resort & Casino and PLDT Home); Ely Buendia – A Night At The Theatre (Full House Theatre Company and Resorts World Manila); Martin Nivera – Twogether (Starmedia Entertainment, DSL and Solaire Resort & Casino)
Female Concert Performer of the Year	
**Regine Velasquez – Unified (Viva Live, Inc.)**; Aicelle Santos – 1 For 3 Concert- (Solaire Resort & Casino and PLDT Home); Jennylyn Mercado – Co Love Concert (Quantum Films, GMA Network and Becky Aguila Entertainment); Lani Misalucha – And The Story Begins (CCC Productions and Resorts World Manila); Pops Fernandez – Twogether (Starmedia Entertainment, DSL and Solaire Resort & Casino); Rachelle Ann Go – The Homecoming Concert (Cornerstone Concert and Resorts World Manila); Sarah Geronimo – Unified (Viva Live, Inc.)	

Note: There were no entries for Alternative Album of the Year, no entries for Rap Album category

=== Special awards ===
**Pilita Corrales Lifetime Achievement Award**
- **Martin Nievera**
**Gawad Parangal Levi Celerio**
- **Vehnee Saturno**

=== People's Choice awards ===
**Dance Recording of the Year**: **Kyle Echarri – “Im Serious” (Star Music)**	**Music Video of the Year**: **Love You Still – Morissette Amon (Underdog Music Philippines)**; **Director: Jason Max**
**Male R&B Artist of the Year**: **JV Decena – “Paano Ba?” (Media Sync Production)**	**Duo/Group Artist of the Year**: **Sandiwa – “Tulong” (Ivory Music)**
**New Group Artist of the Year**: **The Knobs – “Paalam” (Universal Records)**	**New Female Recording Artist of the Year**: **Hannah Precillas – “Sabi Ko Na Nga Ba” (GMA Music)**
**New Male Recording Artist of the Year**: **Kokoy De Santos – “Lagi Lagi” (Star Music)**	**Rap Artist of the Year**: **Matthaios – “Binibini” (Midas Records)**
**Female R&B Artist of the Year**: **Kyrill – “Gunita” (GMA Music)**	**Song of the Year**: **“Binibini” – Matthaios feat. Calvin de Leon (Midas Records)**
