= 8th PMPC Star Awards for Music =

Annual Philippine music awards ceremony

- Date: October 23, 2016; November 20, 2016 (Delayed Telecast on ABS-CBN's Sunday's Best)
- Location: Monet Grand Ballroom, Novotel Manila Araneta Center, Cubao, Quezon City
- Hosted by: Robi Domingo; Alex Gonzaga; Luis Manzano; Jodi Sta. Maria; Kim Chiu; Xian Lim

Television/radio coverage
- Network: ABS-CBN
- Produced by: Airtime Marketing Philippines, Inc.
- Directed by: Bert de Leon

The 8th PMPC Star Awards for Music (also known as the integral part of the 2016 Star For M-TV Awards, with the theme The Fusion of Philippine Entertainment’s Best) was organized by Philippine Movie Press Club headed by current president Fernan de Guzman and produced by Airtime Marketing Philippines, Inc. headed by Tessie Celestino-Howard. It was held at the Novotel Manila, Araneta Center, Cubao, Quezon City on October 23, 2016.

The set of awards were given to Filipino music artists who have major contributions in promoting the Original Pilipino Music (OPM) industry for the past year.

== Major categories ==
Album of the Year	Song of the Year
"Wish I May" – Alden Richards (GMA Records); "Back To Love" – Jolina Magdangal (Star Music); "Be With You" – Darren Espanto (MCA Music); "Bless This Mess" – Bamboo (PolyEast Records); "Marion" – Marion Aunor (Star Music); "The Great Unknown" – Sarah Geronimo (Viva Records); "Nando'n Ako" – Willie Revillame (GMA Records)	"Wish I May" – Alden Richards (GMA Records); Agatha Obar, composer; "Gusto Kita" – Bailey May (Star Music); Jamie Cruz-Mendoza, composer; "Home" – Darren Espanto (MCA Music); Darren Espanto, composer; "Maghihintay Ako" – Jona (Star Music); Dante Bantatua, composer; "Take A Chance" – Marion Aunor (Star Music); Vehnee Saturno, composer; "Tala" – Sarah Geronimo (Viva Records); Emmanuel Sambayan and Nica del Rosario, composers; "Nando'n Ako" – Willie Revillame (GMA Records); Vehnee Saturno, composer
Male Recording Artist of the Year	Female Recording Artist of the Year
Jed Madela – "Iconic" (Star Music); Bamboo – "Bless This Mess" (PolyEast Records); Darren Espanto – "Be With Me" (MCA Music); Erik Santos – "Champion Reborn" (Star Music); Jovit Baldivino – "JB Jukebox" (Star Music); Martin Nievera – "Kahapon Ngayon" (PolyEast Records); Ogie Alcasid – "Ikaw Ang Buhay Ko" (Universal Records)	Jolina Magdangal – Back to Love (Star Music); Aiza Seguerra – "Araw-Gabi: Mga Awit ni Maestro Ryan" (Universal Records); Donna Cruz – "Now and Forever" (Star Music); Marion Aunor – "Marion" (Star Music); Toni Gonzaga – "My Love Story" (Star Music); Zsa Zsa Padilla – "Beginnings" (PolyEast Records)
New Male Recording Artist of the Year	New Female Recording Artist of the Year
Derrick Monasterio – "Derrick Monasterio" (GMA Records); and; Idolito dela Cruz – "Ngayong Nandito Ka" (DB Energy Music Co.) (tied); Bailey May – "Bailey May" (Star Music); Daryl Ong – "Daryl Ong" (Star Music); JC de Vera – "Stellar" (Ivory Music); Kenneth Ray Parsad – "Still" (Universal Records); Matteo Guidicelli – "Matteo Guidicelli" (Star Music)	Janella Salvador – "Janella Salvador" (Star Music); Alyssa Angeles – "Falling in Love" (Synergy Music); Esang de Torres – "Ako ay Kakanta" (MCA Music); Maxine – "Maxine" (Ivory Music); Michelle Ortega – "Michelle Ortega" (Universal Records); Pauline Cueto – "Pauline Cueto" (MCA Music); Yassi Pressman – "Yassi" (Viva Records)
Duo/Group of the Year	Music Video of the Year
T.O.P. – "Top One Project" (GMA Records); Callalily – "Greetings From Callalily" (Universal Records); Never the Strangers – "Screenburn" (Universal Records); Silent Sanctuary – "Langit Luha" (Ivory Music); Six Part Invention – "Always and Ever" (Universal Records); The Company – "Nostalgia" (Universal Records); The Juans – "The Juans" (Universal Records)	"Puso Kong Ito" – Edward Benosa (Star Music); and; Carlo Obispo, director; "Wag Kang Pabebe" – Vice Ganda (Star Music); Jasper Salimbagon, director (tied); "Bibitawan Ka" – Juris (Star Music); Richmond Cadsawan, director; "Cruisin" – Christian Bautista and Julie Anne San Jose (Universal Records); Mark Reyes, director; "Ipapadama Na Lang" – Matteo Guidicelli (Star Music); Peewee Gonzales and Lloyd Corpuz, directors; "Kalsada" – Sam Concepcion (Universal Records); Miguel Tanchanco, director; "Tayo" – Rivermaya (Universal Records); Musseli Cruz, director

== Pop category ==
Pop Album of the Year	Male Pop Artist of the Year
"Wish I May" – Alden Richards (GMA Records); "I Feel Good" – Daniel Padilla (Star Music); "Be With Me" – Darren Espanto (MCA Music); "Champion Reborn" – Erik Santos (Star Music); "Jadine: On The Wings of Love" – James Reid and Nadine Lustre (Star Music); "The Great Unknown" – Sarah Geronimo (Viva Records)	Alden Richards – "Wish I May" (GMA Records); and; Darren Espanto – "Be With Me" (MCA Music) (tied); Daniel Padilla – "I Feel Good" (Star Music); James Reid – "Jadine: On the Wings of Love" (Star Music); Jovit Baldivino – "JB Jukebox" (Star Music); Piolo Pascual – "The Breakup Playlist" (Star Music); Sam Concepcion – "Bago" (Universal Records)
Female Pop Artist of the Year	
Marion Aunor – "Marion" (Star Music); Janella Salvador – "Janella Salvador" (Star Music); Karylle – "A Different Playground" (PolyEast Records); Kathryn Bernardo – "Christmas Duets" (Star Music); Nadine Lustre – "Jadine: On the Wings of Love" (Star Music); Sarah Geronimo – "The Great Unknown" (Viva Records); Toni Gonzaga – "My Love Story" (Star Music)	

== Acoustic, Rock and RnB category ==
Acoustic Album of the Year	Acoustic Artist of the Year
"Araw Gabi: Mga Awit ni Maestro Ryan" – Aiza Seguerra (Universal Records); "Bawat Daan" – Ebe Dancel (Star Music); "Sa'yo Lamang Papuri't Inspirasyon" – Noel Cabangon (Universal Records); "TJ Monterde" – TJ Monterde (PolyEast Records)	Aiza Seguerra – "Araw Gabi: Mga Awit ni Maestro Ryan" (Universal Records); Ebe Dancel – "Bawat Daan" (Star Music); Noel Cabangon – "Sa'yo Lamang Papuri't Inspirasyon" (Universal Records); TJ Monterde – "TJ Monterde" (PolyEast Records)
Rock Album of the Year	Rock Artist of the Year
Avalon Beyond" – Avalon Beyond (Pulp Live Records); "Bless This Mess" – Bamboo (PolyEast Records); "Dating Gawi" – Rico Blanco (Universal Records); "Debris" – Sandwich (PolyEast Records); "Greetings From Callalily" – Callalily (Universal Records); "Langit Luha" – Silent Sanctuary (Ivory Music); "Screenburn" – Never the Strangers (Universal Records)	Bamboo – "Bless This Mess" (PolyEast Records); Avalon Beyond – "Avalon Beyond" (Pulp Live Records); Callalily – "Greetings From Callalily" (Universal Records); Never the Strangers – "Screenburn" (Universal Records); Rico Blanco – "Dating Gawi" (Universal Records); Sandwich – "Debris" (PolyEast Records); Silent Sanctuary – "Langit Luha" (Ivory Music)
RnB Album of the Year	RnB Artist of the Year
"Most Requested Playlist" – Kris Lawrence (Universal Records); "Daryl Ong" – Daryl Ong (Star Music); "Jason Dy" – Jason Dy (MCA Music)	Kris Lawrence – "Most Requested Playlist" (Universal Records); Daryl Ong – "Daryl Ong" (Star Music); Jason Dy – "Jason Dy" (MCA Music)

== Album category ==
Dance Album of the Year	Revival Album of the Year
"#Hashtags" – Hashtags (Star Music); "Bago" – Sam Concepcion (Universal Records); "Bailey" – Bailey May (Star Music); "Be With You" – Darren Espanto (MCA Music); "Classy Girls" – Classy Girls (LOP Productions); "The Juans" – The Juans (Viva Records); "Top One Project" – Top One Project (GMA Records); Zayaw Pilipinas" – Ron Antonio (MCA Music)	"JB Jukebox" – Jovit Baldivino (Star Music); "Big Mouth, Big Band" – Martin Nievera (PolyEast Records); "Araw-Gabi: Mga Awit ni Maestro Ryan" – Aiza Seguerra (Universal Records); "Iconic" – Jed Madela (Star Music); "Ikaw ang Buhay Ko" – Ogie Alcasid (Universal Records); "Kahapon Ngayon" – Martin Nievera (PolyEast Records); "Nostalgia" – The Company (Universal Records); "Now and Forever" – Donna Cruz (Star Music)
Compilation Album of the Year	Album Cover Design of the Year
"Gold" – Gary Valenciano (Universal Records); "#AldubIsForever" – Various artists (Universal Records); "Theme Song Compilation" – Various artists (Star Music); "Himig Handog P-pop Love Songs" – Various artists (Star Music); "Bituin Walang Ningning" – Mark Bautista and Cris Villonco (Viva Records)	"Be With You" – Darren Espanto (MCA Music); "Araw-Gabi: Mga Awit ni Maestro Ryan" – Aiza Seguerra (Universal Records); "I Feel Good" – Daniel Padilla (Star Music); "Now and Forever" – Donna Cruz (Star Music); "Gold" – Gary Valenciano (Universal Records); "Iconic" – Jed Madela (Star Music); "We Are All God's Children" – Jamie Rivera (Star Music); "Back To Love" – Jolina Magdangal (Star Music); "The Great Unknown" – Sarah Geronimo (Viva Records)

== Concert category ==
Concert of the Year	Male Concert Performer of the Year
"Love Catcher" – Lani Misalucha (Independent); Frank Lloyd Mamaril, director; "All Request 5" – Jed Madela; "Birthday Concert" – Darren Espanto; "Flying High" – Kyla (Dreamstar Events); Marvin Caldito, director; "From the Top" – Sarah Geronimo (Viva Concerts); Paolo Valenciano, director; "Gary V. Presents" – Gary Valenciano (Manila Genesis Inc.); Paolo Valenciano, director; "Royals" – Regine Velasquez, Martin Nievera, Erik Santos, and Angeline Quinto	Martin Nievera – "Royals"; Arnel Pineda – "Love Rock N' Roll"; Darren Espanto – "Birthday Concert"; Erik Santos – "Royals"; Gary Valenciano – "Gary V. Presents"; Jed Madela – "All Requests 5"; Mark Bautista – "Here Sings Love"
Female Concert Performer of the Year	
Sarah Geronimo – "From the Top"; Angeline Quinto – "Royals"; Dulce – "Rhe Timeless Diva"; Kyla – "Flying High"; Lani Misalucha – "Love Catcher"; Regine Velasquez – "Royals"; Zsa Zsa Padilla – "Beginnings"	

== Special awards ==
=== Special awards ===
Pilita Corrales Lifetime Achievement Award
- Dulce
Parangal Levi Celerio
- Vicente "Vic" del Rosario, Jr. (Viva Records)
Stars of the Night
- Arjo Atayde and Ria Atayde
