= 15th PMPC Star Awards for Music =

- Show title card
- Date: April 25, 2024
- Venue: Virtual Award Ceremony
- Hosted by: Kris Lawrence; Laarni Lozada; Ethereal Diva

The 15th Star Awards for Music of the Philippine Movie Press Club (PMPC) was aired and livestreamed on Abante TV platforms on December 29, 2024, under the leadership of then-PMPC President Rodel Ocampo Fernando.

The PMPC Star Awards for Music was hosted by Kris Lawrence and Laarni Lozada

== Winners and nominations ==
The following are the nominees for the 15th PMPC Star Awards for Music, covering music released in 2022.

Winners only are listed first and indicated in bold.

Note: The 14th and 15th PMPC Star Awards for Music were schedule both on the same day (on April 25, 2025) via Virtual Award Ceremony.

=== Major categories ===
Album of the Year	Song of the Year
**"Liwanag" – The Juans (Viva Records)**; "Angela Ken" – Angela Ken (Star Music); "Be Us" – BGYO (Star Music); "Feel Good" – Bini (Star Music); "Looking Back" – Lola Amour (Warner Music Philippines); "Run To Me" – Alexa Ilacad and KD Estrada (Star Music)	**"Uhaw" – Dilaw (Warner Music Philippines)**; "Babaguhin ang Buong Mundo" – Julie Anne San Jose (GMA Music); "Give Me Your Forever" – Zack Tabudlo (UMG Philippines); "Higit Sa Sapat" – This Band (Viva Records); "Kumpas" – Moira Dela Torre (Star Music); "Paninindigan Kita" – Ben&Ben (Sony Music Philippines); "Pasilyo" – SunKissed Lola (Ditto Music)
Male Recording Artist of the Year	Female Recording Artist of the Year
**Gary Valenciano – "Pwede Pang Mangarap" (Universal Records)**; Christian Bautista – "Everybody Hurts" (Universal Records); Erik Santos – "Hanggang sa Huli" (Star Music); Gloc-9 – "Paliwanag" (Universal Records); James Reid – "Hatdog" (Island Records Philippines); Noel Cabangon – "Para Sa'yo" (Universal Records); Piolo Pascual – "Tawag Mo" (Star Music); Zack Tabudlo – "Give Me Your Forever" (UMG Philippines)	**Morisette – "Gusto Ko Nang Bumitaw" (Star Music)**; Julie Anne San Jose – "Babaguhin Ang Buong Mundo" (GMA Music); KZ Tandingan – "Tawag Mo" (Star Music); Lani Misalucha – "Isang Panalangin" (Vehnee Saturno Music); Moira Dela Torre – "Kumpas" (Star Music); Nina – "How Can I" (Star Music); Yeng Constantino – "Paliwanag" (Universal Records)
New Male Recording Artist of the Year	New Female Recording Artist of the Year
**Johnrey Rivas – "Twinkle Star" (Philstagers Productions)**; Bernie Batin – "Pabili Wanpipte" (Ivory Music); Jaycee Domincel – "Hanggang Saan Mo Ako Mamahalin" (Mart-O Music Production); Kim de Leon – "Safe With Me" (GMA Music); Raven – "Tayo Pa Rin Talaga" (Sony Music Philippines); Romm Burlat – "Sarili'y Pagbigyan" (TTP Productions); Wize Estabillo – "Mekaniko ng Puso" (Star Music)	**Sanya Lopez – "Hot Maria Clara" (GMA Music)**; Ally Gonzales – "Ating Kabanata" (Vehnee Saturno Music); Ashley Del Mundo – "Can't Get Out" (Star Music); Claudia – "Trigger" (Viva Records); Faith Da Silva – "Sana Sabihin Mo Na Lang" (GMA Music); Mariane Osabel – "Bakit Mahal Pa Rin Kita" (GMA Music)
Duo/Group of the Year	New Group of the Year
**Ben&Ben – "Paninindigan Kita" (Sony Music Philippines)**; Magnus Haven – "Maria Clara" (Warner Music Philippines); Mayonnaise - "Butanding" (Yellow Room Music); Moonstar88 – "Next Week" (Warner Music Philippines); Sponge Cola – "Kung Ako Ang Pumiling Tapusin Ito" (Sony Music Philippines); SunKissed Lola – "Pasilyo" (Ditto Music); True Faith – "Muli" (Viva Records)	**SV Squad – "Nevermind" (Believe Artist Services)**; 1st.One – "Turn Up" (Warner Music Philippines); Calista – "Race Car" (Merlion Events Production Inc.); G22 – "Bang" (CS Music); Vxon – "The Beast" (CS Music); YGIG – "Shaba Shaba" (Universal Records)
Music Video of the Year	
**"WYAT (Where You At)" – SB19 (Warner Music Philippines)**; **Jireh Christian Bacasno, director**; "Ayoko Lang" – Angelina Cruz (Universal Records); Dan Angelo Eligado, director; "Everybody Hurts" – Christian Bautista and Julie Anne San Jose (Universal Records); Treb Monteras, director; "Bang" – G22 (CS Music); Jed Regala, director; "Hot Maria Clara" – Sanya Lopez (GMA Music); Njel de Mesa, director; "Pabalik Sayo" – Darren Espanto (Republic Records Philippines); Darren Espanto and Jonathan Tal Placido, directors; "Re-Up" – Ez Mil (FFP Records and Management Inc.); Life Garland, director	

=== Pop category ===
Pop Album of the Year	Male Pop Artist of the Year
**"Run To Me" – Alexa Ilacad and KD Estrada (Star Music)**; "Habangbuhay" – Ebe Dancel (Widescope Entertainment and Backspacer Records); "Hometown" – Sponge Cola (Sony Music Philippines); "Kasing Kasing Dalampasigan" – Anji Salvacion (Star Music); "Leaving Home" – Any Name's Okay (Sony Music Philippines); "Pasahili" – Arthur Miguel (Warner Music Philippines); "Pasulong" – Alamat (Viva Records)	**LA Santos – "'Di Maghihiwalay" (Star Music)**; Adie – "Kabado" (O/C Records); Arthur Nery – "Sinag" (Viva Records); Darren Espanto – "Pabalik Sa'yo" (Republic Records Philippines); Erik Santos – "Hanggang sa Huli" (Star Music); Jeric Gonzales – "Hihintayin Kita" (GMA Music and BenTria Productions); KD Estrada – "When I See You Again" (Star Music)
Female Pop Artist of the Year	
**Belle Mariano – "Closer" (Star Music)**; Alexa Ilacad – "When I See You Again" (Star Music); Gigi de Lana – "Akin Ka Na Lang" (Star Music); Hannah Precillas – "Sadly Feelings" (GMA Music); Jos Garcia – "Nami-miss Ko Na" (Independent); Maris Racal – "Pumila Ka" (Balcony Entertainment); Zephanie – "Kung Ikaw Ang Kasama" (GMA Music)	

=== Rock, RnB, Rap and Acoustic category ===
Rock Artist of the Year	Rap Artist of the Year
**Juan Karlos – "Shot Puno" (Island Records Philippines)**; Bloodflowers – "Tulong" (Ivory Music); Mayonnaise – "Butanding" (Yellow Room Music); Kanishia – "Here I am Now" (Star Music); Magnus Haven – "Maria Clara" (Warner Music Philippines); True Faith – "Muli" (Viva Records); December Avenue – "Saksi ang Langit" (Ingrooves Music and Tower of Doom Music)	**Ez Mil – "Re-Up" (FFP Records and Management, Inc.)**; Flow G – "Batugan" (Ex Battalion Music); Gloc-9 – "Bahay Yugyugan" (Universal Records); Mhot – "Basic" (Universal Records); Pablo – "La Luna" (Sony Music Philippines); Shanti Dope – "City Girl" (Universal Records); Skusta Clee – "Solo" (Panty Droppaz League and Ex Battalion Music)
Male RnB Artist of the Year	Female RnB Artist of the Year
**Jojo Santor – "Hanggang Dito Na Lang" (Independent)**; Cean Jr – "Still Miss You" (O/C Records and Waybetter Music); Dionela – "Musika" (Republic Records Philippines); Jace Roque – "Trust" (Independent); Janno Gibbs – "Future Lover" (Viva Records); Matt Lozano – "Kwarto" (GMA Music); Psalms David – "Kaulayaw" (GMA Music)	**Marion Aunor – "Traydor Na Pag-ibig" (Viva Records)**; Jona – "Always On Time" (Star Music); Kiana Valenciano – "Heartbeat On Me" (Manila Genesis); Kyla – "'Di Ko Kayang Limutin" (Star Music); KZ Tandingan – "Sabi Sabi" (Star Music); Nina – "How Can I" (Star Music); Rhodessa – "Ideya" (Viva Records)
Male Acoustic Artist of the Year	Female Acoustic Artist of the Year
**Noel Cabangon – "Para Sa'yo" (Universal Records)**; Denin Sy – "Minsan Kape, Minsan Ikaw" (Independent); Nico Frayn – "Marupok" (Independent); Gabo – "Puhon" (Gabo Music); Johnoy Danao – "Kulay Rosas Ang Bukas, Anak" (Bacon and Shrimpie Records); Mcoy Fundales – "Ang Forever Ko'y Ikaw" (GMA Music)	**Sarah Javier – "Happy Anniversary" (Independent)**; Christi Fider – "Heto Na Naman" (Enterphil Entertainment Corporation); Hannah Abogado – "Take Me Out of the Dark" (Independent); Soleil Misalucha – "Pabebe" (Catterfly Records); Eugenie Tan – "Shine" (Independent); Mia Grace – "Para sa Taong Naniniwala" (LAYA Manila)
Inspirational Song of the Year	
**"Isang Panalangin" – Lani Misalucha (Vehnee Saturno Music)**; "Alam Niya" – The Juans (KDR Music House); "Bayaning Marino" – Paul Michael and Bendeatha (FlipMusic Records); "Oh How I Love You Jesus" – Nick Vera Perez (NVP1 Music); "Rosas" – Nica del Rosario (FlipMusic Productions); "Take Me Out of the Dark" – Hannah Abogado (Independent); "There Is a Name" – Hope Filipino Worship (Independent)	

=== Novelty category ===
Novelty Song of the Year	Novelty Artist of the Year
**"Gusto Kita" – Louie Roa (Interstreet Recording)**; "Barbero" – KJ Reyes (KJ Ng Pilipinas Music); "Pabile, Wanpipte!" – Bernie Batin (Ivory Music); "Pag-ibig Ko'y Panalo" – Kakai Bautista (Star Music); "Quaranfling" – Ken Chan (GMA Music); "Wag Kang Bitter" – Seth Mendoza (Gasera Records)	**Bernie Batin – "Pabile, Wanpipte!" (Ivory Music and Video)**; Louie Roa – "Gusto Kita" (Interstreet Recordings); Kakai Bautista – "Pag-ibig Ko'y Panalo" (Star Music); Ken Chan – "Quaranfling" (GMA Music); KJ Reyes – "Barbero" (KJ Ng Pilipinas Music); Seth Mendoza – "Wag Kang Bitter" (Gasera Records)

=== Album category ===
Dance Recording (Album) of the Year	Revival Recording (Album) of the Year
**"Sumayaw" - Kelvin Miranda (GMA Music)**; "Blah Blah" – Kaia (Sony Music Philippines); "Entertain Me" – Ylona Garcia (Warner Music Philippines); "Heart That You Break" – Bryan Termulo (Independent); "Kung Ikaw Ang Kasama" – Zephanie (GMA Playlist); "The Beast" – Vxon (CS Music)	**"Nosi Balasi" – Marion Aunor (Viva Records and Wild Dream Records)**; "214" – Jeremiah Tiangco (GMA Music); "Akin Ka Na Lang" – Gigi de Lana (Star Music); "Ang Huling El Bimbo" – Ace Banzuelo (Sony Music Philippines); "Gusto Ko Nang Bumitaw" – Morissette (Star Music); "Ikaw Lang Ang Iibigin" – Jessica Villarubin (GMA Music); "Magasin" – Nobita (Sony Music Philippines)
Compilation Album of the Year	Collaboration of the Year
**"The Clash Season 4 Finalists Sing Originals" – Various artists (GMA Music)**; "Bola Bola (Original Soundtrack)" – Various artists (Star Music); "Breathe Again" – Various artists (Viva Records); "How To Move On in 30 Days (Original Soundtrack)" – Jeremy G and Angela Ken (Star Music); "Love In 40 Days (Official Soundtrack)" – Various artists (Star Music); "Lyric and Beat (Original Soundtrack Vol. 1)" (Star Music)	**"Mahika" – Adie and Janine Berdin (O/C Records)**; "Sinag" – Arthur Nery and Sam Benwick (Viva Records); "Ikaw Ang" – Sam Concepcion, Yuridope, and Moophs (Tarsier Records); "ILY" – Ogie Alcasid, Regine Velasquez and DJ M.O.D (Star Music); "Basic" – Shanti Dope and Mhot (Universal Records); "Tawag Mo" – Piolo Pascual and KZ Tandingan (Star Music); "Iba" – Zack Tabudlo and Moira Dela Torre (Island Records Philippines)

=== Concert category ===
Concert of the Year	Male Concert Performer of the Year
**Eraserheads Huling El Bimbo – The Eraserheads (Ant Savvy Creatives and Entertainment)**; Becoming Ice: 35th Anniversary Concert – Ice Seguerra (Fire and Ice Media and Productions); Four Kings and A Queen – Nonoy Zuñiga, Hajji Alejandro, Rey Valera, Marco Sison, and Pops Fernandez (Full House Theater Company); Iconic – Sharon Cuneta and Regine Velasquez (iMusic Entertainment Inc. and NY Productions, Inc.); Martin Nievera Live Again! The Best of the Concert King – Martin Nievera (Bloomberry Resorts Corp. and Solaire Resort); Rico Blanco Live at the Araneta Coliseum – Rico Blanco (KDR Music House); SB19 WYAT Tour – SB19 (Black Star Entertainment)	**Martin Nievera – Martin Nievera Live Again! The Best of the Concert King | Bloomberry Resorts Corp. and Solaire Resort**; Bamboo – Rock and Soul Supremacy (Neuwave Events and Productions); Ez Mil – Panalo Homecoming Tour (MAK Entertainment Services); Gloc-9 – Rapsody (Full House Theater Company); Ogie Alcasid – Kilabotitos (A-Team); Rey Valera – Four Kings and a Queen (Full House Theater Company); Rico Blanco – Rico Blanco Live at the Araneta Coliseum (KDR Music House)
Female Concert Performer of the Year	Dou/Group Concert of the Year
**Ice Seguerra – Becoming Ice: 35th Anniversary Concert (Fire and Ice Media and Productions)**; Anne Curtis – Luv Anne Viva Live Inc.; Klarisse de Guzman – Her Time (Jose Marie Viceral and Ambie Burac (Independent Production)); Sharon Cuneta – Iconic (iMusic Entertainment Inc. and NY Productions, Inc.); Julie Anne San Jose – JulieVerse (GMA Synergy); Pops Fernandez – Four Kings and a Queen (Full House Theater Company); Regine Velasquez – Iconic (iMusic Entertainment Inc. and NY Productions, Inc.)	**Eraserheads – Eraserheads Huling El Bimbo (Ant Savvy Creatives and Entertainment)**; Ben&Ben – Ben&Ben Homecoming Concert (Ovation Production); Calista – Vax to Normal Concert (Merlion Events Production Inc.); MNL48 – Magical Night of Love (HalloHallo Entertainment); SB19 – SB19 WYAT Tour (Black Star Entertainment); Side A – Then and Now: Redux 360 Concert (Full House Theater Company); The Juans – The Juans Live in Araneta (KDR Music House & Viva Live Inc.)

=== Special awards ===
**Pilita Corrales Lifetime Achievement Award**
- **Vernie Varga**
**Gawad Parangal Levi Celerio**
- **Odette Quesada**
