= 12th PMPC Star Awards for Music =

- Date: October 10, 2021
- Venue: Virtual awards ceremony
- Hosted by: Alfred Vargas; Sanya Lopez

The 12th PMPC Star Awards for Music by the Philippine Movie Press Club (PMPC), honored the best Filipino music of 2019. The ceremony took place on October 10, 2021 in a Virtual Awarding ceremony via RAD Streaming and STV (Social TV).

The PMPC Star Awards for Music was hosted by Alfred Vargas and Sanya Lopez

== Winners and nominees ==
The following are the nominations for the 12th PMPC Star Awards for Music, covering music released in 2019.

Winners are listed first and indicated in bold.

=== Major categories ===
| Album of the Year | Song of the Year |
|---|---|
| **"Himig Handog 2019" – Various artists (Star Music)**; "Amgo" – John Roa (Viva Records); "BobRey Live" – Ken Chan and Rita Daniela (GMA Music); "Evolution" – Jake Zyrus (Star Music); "Feels Trip" – Agsunts (Star Music); "Langit Mong Bughaw" – December Avenue (Tower of Doom Music); "Limasawa Street" – Ben&Ben (Sony Music Philippines) | **"Mabagal" - Daniel Padilla and Moira Dela Torre (Star Music)**; "Huling Sandali" – December Avenue (Tower of Doom Music); "Imposible" – KZ Tandingan feat. Shanti Dope (Star Music); "Kung 'Di Na Ako" – Agsunta (Star Music); "Pagtingin" – Ben&Ben (Sony Music Philippines); "Patawad, Paalam" – Moira Dela Torre feat. I Belong to the Zoo (Star Music); "Pusong Naliligaw" – Sharlene San Pedro feat. Zack Tabudlo (Ivory Music) |
| Male Recording Artist of the Year | Female Recording Artist of the Year |
| **Daniel Padilla – "Mabagal" (Star Music)**; Garrett Bolden – "Handa Na Maghintay" (GMA Music); Gloc-9 – "Dungaw" (Aristotle Pollisco Music); Janno Gibbs - "Walang Kupas" (Viva Records); John Rendez – "Think About It" (Star Music); Sam Mangubat – "Ikaw At Ikaw Pa Rin" (Star Music); TJ Monterde – "Karera" (PolyEast Records) | **Regine Velasquez – "I Am Beautiful" (Vehnee Saturno Music)**; Aicelle Santos – "Bakit Siya" (GMA Music); Julie Anne San Jose – "Nobela" (Universal Records); Kuh Ledesma – "Sama-Sama sa Pasko" (Bravo Records); KZ Tandingan – "Halik sa Hangin" (Star Music); Moira Dela Torre – "Mabagal" (Star Music); Sarah Geronimo – "Ang Tangi Kong Pangarap" (Viva Records) |
| New Male Recording Artist of the Year | New Female Recording Artist of the Year |
| **Lucas Garcia – "Because You Believed" (Star Music)**; Bryan Chong – "Pakiusap" (GMA Music); Jem Macatuno – "Can't Get Out" (Star Music); Jeric Gonzales – "Taksil" (GMA Music); KD Estrada – "One of Many" (Star Music); Kyle Raphael – "Buwan ng Mayo" (Viva Records); Lance Busa – "Kapit Lang" (Star Music) | **Zephanie – "Pangarap Kong Pangarap Mo" (Star Music)**; AC Bonifacio – "Slide into my DM" (Ivory Music); Ashtine Olviga – "Sabihin Mo Na" (Viva Records); Eamarie Gilayo – "Ikaw at Linggo" (Star Music); Princess Sevillena – "Walang Kasing Ikaw" (Star Music); Sachzna Laparan – "Miss Flawless" (Ex Battallion Music and Frontrow International); Trishia Denise – "Kapag Ako Ay Nagmahal" (Star Music) |
| Duo/Group of the Year | New Group of the Year |
| **Ben&Ben – "Pagtingin" (Sony Music Philippines)**; December Avenue – "Huling Sandali" (Tower of Doom Music); Ken Chan and Rita Daniela – "Tayo ay Forever" (GMA Music); MYMP – "Wishes and Dreams" (Ivory Music); SB19 – "Go Up" (Sony Music Philippines); Side A – "No More Tears" (Ivory Music); The Company – "'Sang Tawag Mo Lang" (Star Music) | **Three Two One – "Hinahanap" (Star Music)**; Chiquerella – "Kalangitan" (Star Music); Hulo – "Sumama Ka" (Star Music); Jose Carlito – "Blankong Imahe" (Star Music); Mntklya – "I Love You Saba'y Bawi" (Ivory Music); Room for Cielo – "Hanggang Dito" (Ivory Music); Sandiwa – "Paraya" (Ivory Music) |
| Music Video of the Year | |
| **"Miss Flawless" – Ex Battalion feat. Bosx1ne, Flow G, and Sachzna Laparan (Ex Battalion Music and Frontrow International)**; **Jomar Lovena and Jill Urdaneta, directors**; "I am Beautiful" – Regine Velasquez (iFace Incorporated); John Lozano, director; "Mabagal" – Daniel Padilla and Moira Dela Torre (Star Music); Peewee Gonzales, director; "Pusong Naliligaw" – Sharlene San Pedro feat. Zack Tabudlo (Ivory Music); John Manalo, director; "Segundo" – Lovi Poe (Viva Records); Nolan Bernardino, director; "Walang Kupas" – Janno Gibbs (Viva Records); Nolan Bernardino, director; "Wishes and Dreams" – MYMP (Ivory Music) | |

=== Pop category ===
| Pop Album of the Year | Male Pop Artist of the Year |
|---|---|
| **"Lara Maigue" – Lara Maigue (Star Music)**; "Ang Soundtrack ng Buhay Mo" – Various artists (Star Music); "Dinner Hour" – Pure Mind Quiet Heart (Ivory Music); "Ikaw ang Melody" – MNL48 (Star Music) | **Garrett Bolden – "Handa Na Maghintay" (GMA Music)**; Carlo Aquino – "Balisong" (Ivory Music); Iñigo Pascual – "Next In Line" (Star Music); Matteo Guidicelli – "Sundo" (Viva Records); Pong Idusora – "Sapi" (Lodi Records); Ruru Madrid – "Nawawala" (GMA Music); TJ Monterde – "Karera" (PolyEast Records) |
| Female Pop Artist of the Year | |
| **Sarah Geronimo – "Ang Tangi Kong Pangarap" (Viva Records)**; Golden Cañedo – "More than Before" (GMA Music); Julie Anne San Jose – "Nobela" (Universal Records); Klarisse de Guzman – "NBSB" (Star Music); Lovi Poe – "Segundo" (Viva Records); Maricris Garcia – "Kahit Ganun Pa Man" (GMA Music); Marion Aunor – "Paasa" (Viva Records) | |

=== Rock, Rap, RnB and Acoustic category ===
| Rock Album of the Year | Rock Artist of the Year |
|---|---|
| **"Langit Mong Bughaw" – December Avenue (Tower of Doom Music)**; "Feels Trip" – Agsunta (Star Music); "Fools and Foes" – Fools and Foes (A Spur of the Moment Project); "Peklat Cream" – Bita and Botflies (O/C Records) | **December Avenue – "Huling Sandali" (Tower of Doom Music)**; Bita and Botflies – "Chopchop Blues" (O/C Records); Fools and Foes – "Rift" (A Spur of the Moment Project); Imago – "Partida" (Universal Records); Wilabaliw – "Not So Fast" (Tower of Doom Music); Yeng Constantino – "Sana Na Lang" (Star Music); Yonin High – "Rock N' Roll Angel" (Star Music) |
| RnB Album of the Year | RnB Male Artist of the Year |
| **"Evolution" – Jake Zyrus (Star Music)**; "Letters Never Sent" – Arthur Nery (Viva Records); "Rowena" – Because (Viva Records) | **Garth Garcia – "Asian Girls" (Ivory Music)**; Arthur Nery – "Binhi" (Viva Records); Because – "Direct" (Viva Records); Justine Vasquez – "Namimiss Kita" (Star Music); Reymond Sajor – "Road Trip" (Ivory Music); Young JV – "Malandi Ka" (Star Music) |
| RnB Female Artist of the Year | Rap Artist of the Year |
| **KZ Tandingan – "Halik sa Hangin" (Star Music)**; Jake Zyrus – "Love Even If" (Star Music); Kyrill – "Silent Rumblings" (GMA Music); Mikee Misalucha – "Unlove You" (Viva Records) | **"Miss Flawless" – Ex Battalion feat. Bosx1ne, Flow G, and Sachzna Laparan (Ex Battalion Music and Frontrow International)**; Arvey – "Dalaga" (Star Music); Blanktape – "My Love" (Star Music and Lodi Records); Gloc-9 – "Dungaw" (Aristotle Pollisco Music); Kritiko – "Salamat Sa" (Star Music); Pio Balbuena – "Lakompera" (Viva Records); Shanti Dope – "Imposible" (Star Music) |
| Male Acoustic Artist of the Year | Female Acoustic Artist of the Year |
| **Jeric Gonzales – "Taksil" (GMA Music)**; Bryan Chong – "Pakiusap" (GMA Music); Jem Macatuno – "Can't Get Out" (Star Music); Mcoy Pundales – "Bakit Kita Hahabulin" (GMA Music); Santy Leonardo – "Rooftop" (Ivory Music) | **Marion Aunor – "Paasa" (Viva Records)**; Alekzandra – "Alalala" (Star Music); Kyline Alcantara – "Paalam Na" (GMA Music); Princess Velasco – "Kaunti Na Lang" (GMA Music) |
| Folk/Country Recording of the Year | Collaboration of the Year |
| **"Oryang" – Davey Langit (Star Music)**; "Ayaw" – Syd Hartha (Sony Music Philippines); "Buwan ng Mayo" – Kyle Raphael (Viva Records); "Sampaguita" – Ben&Ben (Sony Music Philippines) | **"Mabagal" – Daniel Padilla and Moira Dela Torre (Star Music)**; "Bakit Siya" – Aicelle Santos and Maricris Garcia (GMA Music); "Tag-araw" – Bela Padilla and Xia Vigor (Viva Records); "Miss Flawless" – Ex Battalion Bosx1ne, Flow G and Sachzna Laparan (Ex Battalion Music and Frontrow International); "Partida" – Imago and Bente Dos (Universal Records); "Perfectly Imperfect" – Jeremy Glinoga and Jayda Avanzado (Star Music); "Imposible" – Shanti Dope and KZ Tandingan (Star Music) |

=== Novelty category ===
| Novelty Song of the Year | Novelty Artist of the Year |
|---|---|
| **"Mataba" – Cool Cat Ash (Star Music)**; "Amfee" – Alex Gonzaga (Star Music); "Hanggang Andito Pa" – Gari Escobar (Ivory Music); "My Love" – Blanktape (Star Music and Lodi Records) | **Cool Cat Ash – "Mataba" (Star Music)**; Alex Gonzaga – "Amfee" (Star Music); Blanktape – "My Love" (Star Music and Lodi Records); Gari Escobar – "Hanggang Andito Pa" (Ivory Music) |

=== Album category ===
| Dance Album of the Year | Revival Album of the Year |
|---|---|
| **"Pinapa" – Ianna Dela Torre (Star Music)**; "Adios" – Iñigo Pascual (Star Music); "Dungaw" – Gloc-9 (Aristotle Pollisco Music); "Hagod" – Ron Antonio (Total Music Entertainment); "Rewind" – Riva Quenery (Ivory Music); "Sabay sa Bayle" – Thyro Alfaro and Yumi Lacsamana (Viva Records); "Slide Into My DM" – AC Bonifacio (Ivory Music) | **"Next in Line" – Iñigo Pascual (Star Music)**; "Ako'y Sayo Ika'y Akin" – KZ Tandingan (Star Music); "Bawat Daan" – Zephanie (Star Music); "Maghintay Ka Lamang" – Anthony Rosaldo (GMA Music); "Maging Sino Ka Man" – Kim Molina (Viva Records); "Nobela" – Julie Anne San Jose (Universal Records); "Sundo" – Matteo Guidicelli (Viva Records) |
| Compilation Album of the Year | |
| **"Himig Handog 2019" – Various artists (Star Music)**; "Budots Version Non Stop" – Various artists (Star Music); "Gold Squad Album" – Various artists (Star Music); "Idol Philippines" – Various artists (Star Music); "Kantalikasan" – Various artists (Ivory Music) | |

=== Concert category ===
| Concert of the Year | Male Concert Performer of the Year |
|---|---|
| **Perfect Ten – Lea Salonga (Resorts World Manila, Ultimate Shows, Inc. and Full House Theater Company, Inc.)**; Angeline K' To: Concert Namin 'To – Angeline Quinto and K Brosas (Star Events and Cornerstone Entertainment); Braver – Moira Dela Torre (Star Events and Cornerstone Entertainment); Iconic – Sharon Cuneta and Regine Velasquez (iME, NSYshows and Artisthouse); Juris – Juris (Resorts World Manila); Ogie and the Hurados – Ogie Alcasid (Ultimate Shows, Inc.); The OPM Hitmen – Various artists (BrentSystem Corporation and LilBravehearts, Inc.) | **Luke Mejares – Sound Trip Sessions Vol. 1 |(Dragon Arc Events Management)**; Chad Borja – The OPM Hitmen Live! (BrentSystem Corporation and LilBravehearts, Inc.); Ogie Alcasid – Ogie and The Hurados (Ultimate Shows, Inc.); Raymond Lauchengco – Into The 80's (Solaire Resort & Casino); Richard Reynoso – The OPM Hitmen Live! (BrentSystem Corporation and LilBravehearts, Inc.); Rico Blanco – Rico Blanco x IV of Spades Live in Concert (Balcony Entertainment and IVOS); Ronnie Liang – Love x Romance Concert (Viva Live, Inc.) |
| Female Concert Performer of the Year | Duo/Group Concert of the Year |
| **Regine Velasquez – Iconic (iME, NSYshows and Artisthouse)**; Angeline Quinto – Angeline K' To: Concert Namin 'To (Star Events and Cornerstone Entertainment); Katrina Velarde – Sikat i2: Katrina Velarde Live In Concert (Viva Live, Inc.); Lea Salonga – Perfect Ten (Resorts World Manila, Ultimate Shows, Inc. and Full House Theater Company, Inc.); Moira Dela Torre – Braver (Star Events and Cornerstone Entertainment); Sharon Cuneta – Iconic (iME, NSYshows and Artisthouse); Zsa Zsa Padilla – Totally Zsa Zsa (Ultimate Shows, Inc.) | **South Border – Romantic Wednesdate (Red Crane Productions and Resorts World Manila)**; Freestyle – Romantic Wednesdate (Red Crane Productions and Resorts World Manila); IV of Spades – Rico Blanco x IV of Spades Live in Concert! (Balcony Entertainment and IVOS); Ken Chan and Rita Daniela – My Special Love #BoBreyInConcert (GMA Music and Starmedia Entertainment); Mayonnaise – #Mayonnaiseventeen: Mayonnaise 17th Anniversary Show (Yellow Room Music Philippines and Macbeth Philippines); The Company – Party of 5 (Uno High School Alumni Association Inc.); True Faith – Romantic Wednesdate (Red Crane Productions and Resorts World Manila) |

Note: There were no entries for Alternative Album of the Year, no entries for Rap Album category

=== Special awards ===
Pilita Corrales Lifetime Achievement Award: Kuh Ledesma

Parangam Levi Cerelio: Louie Ocampo

Plaque of Appreciation for PMPC Benefit Concert Awit ng Pandemya

- Kuh Ledesma
- Christian Bautista
- Jed Madela
- Gerald Santos
- Jeric Gonzales
- Ima Castro
- Alden Richards
