= PMPC Star Award for Male Recording Artist of the Year =

Annual Philippine music award

- Country: Philippines
- Presented by: PMPC
- First award: 2009
- Final award: 2026
- Currently held by: TJ Monterde - "Sariling Mundo"

The PMPC Star Award for Male Recording Artist of the Year is one of the awards handed out at the annual PMPC Star Awards for Music.

The Male Recording Artist of the Year award is one of the most prestigious categories of the awards (alongside Song of the Year, Album of the Year And Female Recording Artist of the Year). It was first awarded in 2009 and presented to Ogie Alcasid for their album "The Great Filipino Songbook".

Jed Madela is the artist to win the awards with 5.

== Recipients ==
Ed. (Year)	Winner(s)	Work	Nominees	Ref.
1st (2009)	Ogie Alcasid	"The Great Filipino Songbook"	Billy Crawford – "Groove"; Gary Valenciano – "Rebirth"; Jed Madela – "Songs Rediscovered 2"; Martin Nievera – "Ikaw ang Aking Pangarap"; Richard Poon – "For You"; Rico Blanco – "Your Universe"	
2nd (2010)	Christian Bautista; Erik Santos	"Romance Revisited: the Love Songs of Jose Mari Chan"; "The Jim Brickman Songbook"	Gary Valenciano – "As 1"; Gino Padilla – "Let Me Be The One"; Martin Nievera – "As Always"; Noel Cabangon – "Byahe"; Piolo Pascual – "Decades"	
3rd (2011)	Jed Madela	"The Classics Album"	Cesar Montano – "Cesar Montano"; Christian Bautista – "A Wonderful Christmas"; Erik Santos – "All I Want This Christmas"; Gary Valenciano – "Replay"; Jim Paredes – "Laro"; Martin Nievera – "Himig ng Damdamin"; Ogie Alcasid – "Ngayon at Kailanman"	
4th (2012)	Jed Madela	"Breathe Again"	Basil Valdez – "Basil Valdez"; Christian Bautista – "Outbound"; Erik Santos – "Awit Para Sa'yo"; Gary Valenciano – "With Love"; Martin Nievera – "Mga Awit at Damdamin"; Noel Cabangon – "Panaginip"	
5th (2013)	Jed Madela	"All Originals"	Christian Bautista – "X Plus"; Gary Valenciano – "Just For You"; Gerald Santos – "The Prince of Ballad"; Marco Sison – "Isang Pagkakataon"; Martin Nievera – "3D Tatlong Dekada"; Ogie Alcasid – "The Songwriter And The Hitmakers"	
6th (2014)	Gary Valenciano	"With Love, Gary Valenciano"	Chad Borja – "Show Me The Way"; Daniel Padilla – "I Heart You"; Gloc-9 – "Liham At Lihim"; Kris Lawrence – "Spread The Love"; Raymond Lauchengco – "The Promise"; Vice Ganda – "Vice Ganda"	
7th (2015)	Gloc 9; Vice Ganda	"Biyahe ng Pangarap"; "Trending"	Christian Bautista – "Soundtrack"; Janno Gibbs – "Novela"; Martin Nievera – "Big Mouth Big Band"; Noel Cabangon – "Throwback"; Richard Poon – "The Crooner Sings Bacharach"	
8th (2016)	Jed Madela	"Iconic"	Bamboo – "Bless This Mess"; Darren Espanto – "Be With Me"; Erik Santos – "Champion Reborn"; Jovit Baldivino – "JB Jukebox"; Martin Nievera – "Kahapon Ngayon"; Ogie Alcasid – "Ikaw Ang Buhay Ko"	
9th (2017/18)	Martin Nievera	"Kahapon Ngayon"	Alden Richards – "Say It Again"; Daniel Padilla – "Greatest Hits and More"; Gary Valenciano – "Gary V @ Primetime"; Lloyd Umali – "Bakit Ka Pa Bumalik"; Michael Pangilinan – "Michael"; Piolo Pascual – "Greatest Themes"; Richard Poon – "Richard x Richard: The Chinito Crooners"	
10th (2018)	Christian Bautista	"Kapit"	Dingdong Avanzado – "Jessa Zaragoza Hits Medley"; Ebe Dancel – "Sa 'Yo"; Janno Gibbs – "My Jagiya"; Ogie Alcasid – "Nakakalokal"; Sam Milby – "Tunay Na Pag ibig"; Xian Lim – "Getting To Know Each Other Too Well"	
11th (2019/20)	Christian Bautista; Jed Madela	"Aking Mahal"; "Di Matitinag"	Alden Richards – "Until I See You Again"; Billy Crawford – "Filipina Girl"; Daniel Padilla – "Malay Ko"; Gary Valenciano – "Ililigtas Ka Niya"; Juan Karlos Labajo – "Buwan"; Ronnie Liang – "Ligaya"	
12th (2020/21)	Daniel Padilla	"Mabagal"	Garrett Bolden – "Handa Na Maghintay"; Gloc-9 – "Dungaw"; Janno Gibbs – "Walang Kupas"; John Rendez – "Think About It"; Sam Mangubat – "Ikaw At Ikaw Pa Rin"; TJ Monterde – "Karera"	
13th (2021/22)	Christian Bautista	"Bukas Wala Nang Ulan"	Alden Richards – "Goin Crazy"; Arnel Pineda – "Your Soldiers"; Ebe Dancel – "Wag Mong Aminin"; Erik Santos – "Walang Hanggang Paalam"; Martin Nievera – "Di Na Muli"; Piolo Pascual – "Iiyak sa Ulan"	
14th (2022/23)	Zack Tabudlo	"Binibini"	Arnel Pineda – "Cardo Dalisay"; Arthur Nery – "Iisa Lang"; Erik Santos – "Sigaw ng Puso"; Juan Karlos Labajo – "Boston"; Mark Carpio – "Para Sayo Lang"; Rico Blanco – "Pinoy Ako"	
15th (2023/24)	Gary Valenciano	"Pwede Pang Mangarap"	Christian Bautista – "Everybody Hurts"; Erik Santos – "Hanggang sa Huli"; Gloc-9 – "Paliwanag"; James Reid – "Hatdog"; Noel Cabangon – "Para Sa'Yo"; Piolo Pascual – "Tawag Mo"; Zack Tabudlo – "Give Me Your Forever"	
16th (2024)	Juan Karlos Labajo; Ogie Alcasid	"Ere"; "Huwag Mo Kong Iwan"	Bamboo – "Treading Water"; Billy Crawford – "Love Is In The Air"; Christian Bautista – "You Are Everything"; Erik Santos – "Kasunod"; Zack Tabudlo – "Akin Ka"	
17th (2025/26)	TJ Monterde	"Sariling Mundo"	Darren Espanto – "Iyo"; Iñigo Pascual – "Kahit Di Mo Ko Nakikita 2"; Juan Karlos – "Tanga Mo Juan"; Maki – "Dilaw"; Rob Deniel – "Happy Ending"	

== Artist with multiple awards ==
Five awards

- Jed Madela

Four awards

- Christian Bautista

Two awards

- Gary Valenciano
- Ogie Alcasid

== Artist with multiple nominations ==
Ten nominations

- Christian Bautista

Nine nominations

- Gary Valenciano
- Martin Nievera

Eight nominations

- Erik Santos

Six nominations

- Jed Madela
- Ogie Alcasid

Four nominations

- Daniel Padilla
- Gloc-9
- Juan Karlos Labajo
- Noel Cabangon
- Piolo Pascual

Three nominations

- Alden Richards
- Billy Crawford
- Janno Gibbs
- Richard Poon
- Zack Tabudlo

Two nominations

- Arnel Pineda
- Bamboo
- Darren Espanto
- Ebe Dancel
- Rico Blanco
- TJ Monterde
- Vice Ganda
