= PMPC Star Award for Female Recording Artist of the Year =

Annual Philippine music award

- Country: Philippines
- Presented by: PMPC
- First award: 2009
- Final award: 2026
- Currently held by: Moira Dela Torre - "San Ka Na"

The PMPC Star Award for Female Recording Artist of the Year is one of the awards handed out at the yearly PMPC Star Awards for Music. The Female Recording Artist of the Year award is one of the most prestigious categories of the awards (alongside Song of the Year, Album of the Year And Male Recording Artist of the Year). It was first awarded in 2009 and presented to Regine Velasquez for their album "Low Key".

Sarah Geronimo is the artist to win the awards with 6.

== Recipients ==
Ed. (Year)	Winner(s)	Work	Nominees	Ref.
1st (2009)	Regine Velasquez	"Low Key"	Aiza Seguerra – "Open Arms"; Bayang Barrios – "Biyaya"; Lani Misalucha – "Reminisce"; Lea Salonga – "Inspired"; Rachelle Ann Go – "Falling In Love"; Sarah Geronimo – "OPM"	
2nd (2010)	Sarah Geronimo	"Music and Me"	Aiza Seguerra – "Aiza Seguerra Live"; Jaya – "Real Love Stories"; Joey Albert – "Songs of the Heart"; KC Concepcion – "KC"; Nina – "Renditions of The Soul"; Rachel Alejandro – "Believe"; Yeng Constantino – "Lapit"	
3rd (2011)	Sarah Geronimo	"One Heart"	Frencheska Farr – "Inside My Heart"; Kyla – "Private Affair"; Lea Salonga – "Your Songs"; Regine Velasquez – "Fantasy"; Toni Gonzaga – "All Me"; Vina Morales – "Awit Ng Buhay"	
4th (2012)	Aiza Seguerra (Note: Due to Identify as Transman Aiza/Ice seguerra Won the Female Recording Artist of the Year for Songs from the Vault and Wag Kang Aalis in the 4th and 14th pmpc star awards for music According to the PMPC for Music that Gender Categories is Assigned at Birth that means Not Allowed Aiza/Ice Seguerra in the Male Recording Artist Category Because of Identity Crisis)	"Songs from the Vault"	Angeline Quinto – "Fall In Love Again"; Ivy Violan – "In Love"; Jaya – "All Souled Out"; Juris – "Forevermore"; Lea Salonga – "The Journey So Far"; Yeng Constantino – "Yeng Versions Live"	
5th (2013)	Sarah Geronimo	"Pure"	Angeline Quinto – "Fall In Love"; Jessa Zaragoza – "Pag Wala ng Ulan"; Juris – "Paskong Puno ng Kasiyahan"; Lani Misalucha – "The Love Collection"; Nina – "All Good"; Yeng Constantino – "Metamorphosis"	
6th (2014)	Sarah Geronimo	"Expressions"	Angeline Quinto – "Higher Love"; Charice Pempengco – "Chapter 10"; Jonalyn Viray – "Jonalyn Viray"; Juris – "Dreaming Of You"; Lani Misalucha – "The Nightingale Returns"; Regine Velasquez – "Hulog Ka ng Langit"	
7th (2015)	Sarah Geronimo	"Perfectly Imperfect"	Jamie Rivera – "We Are All God's Children"; Kuh Ledesma – "Memories"; Pilita Corrales – "Duets"; Sheryl Cruz – "Sa Puso Ko'y Ikaw Pa Rin"; Toni Gonzaga – "Celestine"; Yeng Constantino – "All About Love"	
8th (2016)	Jolina Magdangal	"Back to Love"	Aiza Seguerra – "Araw Gabi: Mga Awit Ni Maestro Ryan"; Donna Cruz – "Now And Forever"; Marion Aunor – "Marion"; Sarah Geronimo – "The Great Unknown"; Toni Gonzaga – "My Love Story"; Zsa Zsa Padilla – "Beginnings"	
9th (2017/18)	Angeline Quinto	"@LoveAngelineQuinto"	Charice Pempengco – "Catharsis"; Ima Castro – "Ikaw Na Ba?"; Jennylyn Mercado – "Ultimate"; Jona – "Jona"; Julie Anne San Jose – "Chasing The Light"; KZ Tandingan – "Soul Supremacy"; Vina Morales – "Vina XXX"	
10th (2018)	Moira Dela Torre	"Malaya"	Glaiza de Castro – "Sinta"; Jessa Zaragoza – "Sa Ngalan ng Pag-ibig"; Jona – "Sampu"; Kyla – "Only Gonna Love You"; Laarni Lozada – "Ikaw Yun"; Regine Velasquez – "Hugot"; Sarah Geronimo – "Ganito"	
11th (2019/20)	Moira Dela Torre	"Kahit Maputi na ang Buhok ko"	Alex Gonzaga – "Chambe"; Jaya – "Hanggang Dito Na Lang"; Jona – "Ngayon at Kailanman"; Julie Anne San Jose – "Tayong Dalawa"; Juris – "Say That You Love Me"; Regine Velasquez – "Ikaw Ang Aking Mahal"; Sharon Cuneta – "Hanggang Dulo"	
12th (2020/21)	Regine Velasquez	"I Am Beautiful"	Aicelle Santos – "Bakit Siya"; Julie Anne San Jose – "Nobela"; Kuh Ledesma – "Sama Sama sa Pasko"; KZ Tandingan – "Halik sa Hangin"; Moira Dela Torre – "Mabagal"; Sarah Geronimo – "Ang Tangi Kong Pangarap"	
13th (2021/22)	Moira Dela Torre	"Paubaya"	Aicelle Santos – "Bilangin Ang Bituin Sa Langit"; Ima Castro – "This Little Child"; Julie Anne San Jose – "Bahaghari"; KZ Tandingan – "Marupok"; Morissette – "Love You Still"; Regine Velasquez – "Mahal Ko O Mahal Ako"	
14th (2022/23)	Ice Seguerra	"Wag Kang Aalis"	Angeline Quinto – "Huwag Kang Mangamba"; Jona – "Init Sa Magdamag"; KZ Tandingan – "Dodong"; Moira Dela Torre – "Ikaw at Ako"; Morissette – "Shine"; Yeng Constantino – "Kumapit"	
15th (2023/24)	Morissette	"Gusto Ko Nang Bumitaw"	Julie Anne San Jose – "Babaguhin Ang Buong Mundo"; KZ Tandingan – "Tawag Mo"; Lani Misalucha – "Isang Panalangin"; Moira Dela Torre – "Kumpas"; Nina – "How Can I"; Yeng Constantino – "Paliwanag"	
16th (2024)	Sarah Geronimo	"Habang Buhay"	Julie Anne San Jose – "Something"; Katrina Velarde – "Ako Ba o Siya"; KZ Tandingan – "Walang Kapalit"; Moira Dela Torre – "Pangako"; Morissette Amon – "Something All We Know"; Regine Velasquez – "Nag iisa Lang"; Yeng Constantino – "Hamon Ng Mundo"	
17th (2025/26)	Moira Dela Torre	"San Ka Na"	Dia Mate – "Ganda Gandahan"; Eliza Maturan – "Museo"; Janah Zaplan – "I Luv U"; Jayda Avanzado – "Right Lover, Wrong Time"; Klarisse de Guzman – "Minamahal Pa Rin Ako"; KZ Tandingan – "Toyo"	

== Artist with multiple awards ==
Six awards

- Sarah Geronimo

Four awards

- Moira Dela Torre

Two awards

- Regine Velasquez
- Aiza/Ice Seguerra

== Artist with multiple nominations ==
Ten nominations

- Sarah Geronimo

Eight nominations

- Moira Dela Torre
- Regine Velasquez

Seven nominations

- KZ Tandingan
- Yeng Constantino

Six nominations

- Julie Anne San Jose

Five nominations

- Aiza/Ice Seguerra
- Angeline Quinto
- Jonalyn/Jona Viray

Four nominations

- Juris Fernandez
- Lani Misalucha
- Morissette Amon

Three nominations

- Jaya
- Lea Salonga
- Nina
- Toni Gonzaga

Two nominations

- Aicelle Santos
- Charice Pempengco/Jake Zyrus
- Ima Castro
- Jessa Zaragoza
- Kyla
- Kuh Ledesma
- Vina Morales
