= Star Awards for Music =

Annual Philippine music award ceremony

PMPC Star Awards for Music
- Current: 16th PMPC Star Awards for Music
- Awarded for: Excellence in Philippine music
- Country: Philippines
- Presented by: Philippine Movie Press Club
- First award: October 29, 2009; 17 years ago
- Final award: June 25, 2026; 4 months ago

Star Awards for Music is an annual award ceremony recognizing outstanding music industries in the Philippines. It is organized by the Philippine Movie Press Club (PMPC), an organization of entertainment writers and reporters founded in 2009.

== History ==
After the major success of award ceremonies of film and television counterparts, the Philippine Movie Press Club (PMPC) formed the award-giving ceremony to recognize the music industries in the Philippines.The event was conceived and established under the leadership of then-President Roldan Castro, who also served as the Overall Chairman. He was joined by Chairman Romel Galapon and Co-Chairman Rodel Fernando in bringing the project to life, with the invaluable support of the National Press Club (NPC) and the Alyansa ng Filipinong Mamamahayag (AFIMA) as the event’s producers. The inaugural award ceremony was held at Skydome, SM City North EDSA, in Quezon City on October 29, 2009.

== Ceremonies ==
Edition	Date	Venue	City	Ref.
1st	October 29, 2009	Skydome, SM City North EDSA	Quezon City	
2nd	October 10, 2010	Henry Lee Irvin Theater, Ateneo de Manila University	Quezon City	
3rd	October 16, 2011	Henry Lee Irvin Theater, Ateneo de Manila University	Quezon City	
4th	September 9, 2012	Meralco Theater	Pasig	
5th	October 13, 2013	Solaire Resort & Casino	Parañaque	
6th	September 14, 2014	Solaire Resort & Casino	Parañaque	
7th	November 10, 2015	Kia Theater	Quezon City	
8th	October 23, 2016	Novotel Manila Araneta Center	Quezon City	
9th	September 9, 2018	Newport Performing Arts Theater	Pasay	
10th	September 9, 2018	Newport Performing Arts Theater	Pasay	
11th	January 23, 2020	Skydome, SM City North EDSA	Quezon City	
12th	October 10, 2021	Virtually held due to COVID-19 pandemic in the Philippines		
13th	October 12, 2022	Newport Performing Arts Theater	Pasay	
14th	April 25, 2024	Announced through Facebook		
15th	April 25, 2024	Announced through Facebook		
16th	October 27, 2024	Carlos P. Romulo Auditorium, RCBC Plaza	Makati	
17th	June 25, 2026	Teatrino Promenade	San Juan	

== Award categories ==
=== Major awards ===
- Album of the Year (since 2009)
- Song of the Year (since 2009)
- Male Recording Artist of the Year (since 2009)
- Female Recording Artist of the Year (since 2009)
- New Male Recording Artist of the Year (since 2009)
- New Female Recording Artist of the Year (since 2009)
- Duo/Group Artist of the Year (since 2009)
- Music Video of the Year (since 2009)

=== Genre awards ===
==== Active awards ====
- Male Pop Artist of the Year (since 2009)
- Female Pop Artist of the Year (since 2009)
- Pop Album of the Year (since 2009)
- Revival Album of the Year (since 2009)
- Dance Album/Recording of the Year (since 2009)
- Rock Album of the Year (since 2009)
- Rock Artist of the Year (since 2009)
- Male Acoustic Artist of the Year (since 2010)
- Female Acoustic Artist of the Year (since 2010)
- Rap Artist of the Year (since 2010)
- Novelty Artist of the Year (since 2010)
- Novelty Song of the Year (since 2010)
- R&B Male Artist of the Year (since 2018)
- R&B Female Artist of the Year (since 2018)
- Collaboration of the Year (since 2020)
- New Group Artist of the Year (since 2020)

==== Retired awards ====
- Acoustic Album of the Year (2009–2014; 2016–2024)
- Acoustic Artist of the Year (2016; 2020)
- Album Cover Design of the Year (2009–2018)
- Alternative Album of the Year (2009; 2011; 2013)
- Duo/Group Concert Performer of the Year (2012; 2021; 2024)
- Folk/Country Recording of the Year (2020–2024)
- Jazz Artist of the Year (2010)
- Male Rock Artist of the Year (2012; 2015)
- Female Rock Artist of the Year (2012; 2015)

=== Special awards ===
Pilita Corrales Lifetime Achievement Award (since 2009)

- 2009: APO Hiking Society
- 2010: Pilita Corrales
- 2011: Nora Aunor
- 2012: Jose Mari Chan
- 2013: Freddie Aguilar
- 2014: Lea Salonga
- 2015: Rey Valera
- 2017: Imelda Papin
- 2018: Basil Valdez
- 2020: Regine Velasquez
- 2021: Kuh Ledesma
- 2022: Martin Nievera
- 2023: Hajji Alejandro
- 2024 (15th): Vernie Varga
- 2024 (16th): Gary Valenciano
- 2026: Andrew E. and Celeste Legaspi

Parangal Levi Celerio Achievement Award (since 2014)

- 2014: Ryan Cayabyab
- 2015: Ogie Alcasid
- 2018: Gary Valenciano
- 2020: Jose Mari Chan
- 2021: Louie Ocampo
- 2022: Vehnee Saturno
- 2023: Rey Valera
- 2024 (15th): Odette Quesada
- 2024 (16th): Homer Flores
- 2026: Mon Del Rosario
