= 3rd PMPC Star Awards for Music =

- Date: October 16, 2011
- Venue: Henry Irwin Lee Theater; Ateneo de Manila University, Quezon City
- Hosted by: Karylle; Nikki Gil; Christian Bautista; Gian Magdangal

The 3rd PMPC Star Awards for Music by the Philippine Movie Press Club (PMPC), honored the best Filipino music of 2010. The ceremony took place on October 16, 2011, in Henry Irwin Lee Theater, Ateneo de Manila University in Quezon City.

The PMPC Star Awards for Music was hosted by Karylle, Nikki Gil, Gian Magdangal and Christian Bautista. A delayed telecast for the award ceremony was broadcast by Net 25 on October 22 and 23, 2011.

== Winners and nominees ==
The following are the nominations for the 3rd PMPC Star Awards for Music, covering music released in 2010.

Winners are listed first and indicated in bold.

=== Major categories ===
Album of the Year	Song of the Year
**"Tropa" – Siakol (Synergy Music)**; "All Me" – Toni Gonzaga (Star Records); "Cesar Montano" – Cesar Montano (Sony Music Philippines); "Fantasy" – Regine Velasquez (Universal Records); "One Heart" – Sarah Geronimo (Viva Records); "Private Affair" – Kyla (PolyEast Records); "Talumpati" – Gloc-9 (Sony Music Philippines)	**"Patuloy Ang Pangarap" – Angeline Quinto from the album "Angeline Quinto" (Star Records)**; "Can't Help Myself" – Toni Gonzaga from the album "All Me" (Star Records); "Darating Ang Araw" – Cesar Montano from the album "Cesar Montano" (Sony Music Philippines); "Ituloy Mo Lang" – Siakol from the album "Tropa" (Synergy Music); "Maghihintay" – Mark Alain from the album "Mark Alain" (Sony Music Philippines); "Sino Nga Ba Siya?" – Sarah Geronimo from the album "One Heart" (Viva Records); "Walang Natira" – Gloc-9 from the album "Talumpati" (Sony Music Philippines)
Male Recording Artist of the Year	Female Recording Artist of the Year
**Jed Madela– "The Classics Album" (Universal Records)**; Cesar Montano – "Cesar Montano" (Sony Music Philippines); Christian Bautista – "A Wonderful Christmas" (Universal Records); Erik Santos – "All I Want This Christmas" (Star Records); Gary Valenciano – "Replay" (Universal Records; Jim Paredes – "Laro" (MCA Music); Martin Nievera – "Himig ng Damdamin" (PolyEast Records); Ogie Alcasid – "Ngayon at Kailanman" (Universal Records)	**Sarah Geronimo – "One Heart" (Viva Records)**; Frencheska Farr – "Inside My Heart" (GMA Records); Kyla – "Private Affair" (PolyEast Records ); Lea Salonga – "Your Songs" (Sony Music Philippines); Regine Velasquez – "Fantasy" (Universal Records); Toni Gonzaga – "All Me (Star Records); Vina Morales – "Awit Ng Buhay" (Star Records)
New Male Recording Artist of the Year	New Female Recording Artist of the Year
**Jake Vargas – "Ngiti" (Dyna Music)**; Jaco – "Ako Naman" (PolyEast Records); Joel Mendoza – "Pakinggan Mo Ako" (Viva Records); Jovit Baldivino – "I'd Do Anything For Love" (Star Records); Mark Alain – "Mark Alain" (Sony Music Philippines); Marvin Estrella – "Marvin Estrella" (Synergy Music); Marvin Ong – "Marvin Ong" (Viva Records)	**Angeline Quinto – "Angeline Quinto" (Star Records)**; Maggie Trinidad – "Back Home" (Mamarazzi Entertainment Production); Tricia Garcia – "Kulay" (MCA Music); Yssa Alvarez – "Addicted to Acoustic 3" (Viva Records)
Duo/Group of the Year	Music Video of the Year
**Sakto (Rodjun Cruz, Lucky Mercado and Edgar Allan Guzman) – "Sakto" (Sony Music Philippines)**; Cueshé –"Life" (Sony Music Philippines); Frio – "Overboard" (Synergy Music); "Mayonnaise – "Pula" (Viva Records); Parokya ni Edgar – "Pop Rockers" (Universal Records); Siakol – "Tropa" (Synergy Music); 3AM – "3AM" (Star Records)	**"Walang Natira" – Gloc-9 (Sony Music Philippines)**; **Jaime Pacena II, director**; "I Believe" – Jed Madela (Universal Records); "Hanging Habagat" – Champ Lui Pio (PolyEast Records); "Kahit May Mahal ka Nang Iba" – Mark Bautista (Viva Records); "Kaya Mo" – Tutti Karingal, Kean Cipriano, and Ney Dimaculangan (Star Records); "You Were There" – Piolo Pascual (Star Records); "You Don't Know" – Regine Velasquez (Universal Records)

=== Pop category ===
Pop Album of the Year	Male Pop Artist of the Year
**"Decades 2" – Piolo Pascual (Star Records)**; Nagmamahal – Mark Bautista (Viva Records); "Nang Dahil Sa Pag-ibig" – Bugoy Drilon (Star Records); "Ngayon at Kailanman" – Ogie Alcasid (Universal Records); "One Heart" – Sarah Geronimo (Viva Records); "Pinakahihintay" – Gerald Santos (PolyEast Records); "Your Songs" – Lea Salonga (Sony Music Philippines)	**Gerald Santos – "Pinakahihintay" (PolyEast Records); and**; **Piolo Pascual – "Decades 2" (Star Records) (tied)**; Bugoy Drilon –"Nang Dahil Sa Pag-ibig" (Star Records); Jed Madela – "The Classics Album" (Universal Records); Mark Bautista – "Nagmamahal" (Viva Records); Martin Nievera – "Himig ng Damdamin" (PolyEast Records); Ogie Alcasid – "Ngayon at Kailanman" (Universal Records)
Female Pop Artist of the Year	
**Toni Gonzaga – All Me (Star Records)**; Carol Banawa – "My Music, My Life" (Star Records); Faith Cuneta – "A Twist of Faith" (PolyEast Records); Frencheska Farr – "Inside My Heart" (GMA Records); Lea Salonga – "Your Songs" (Sony Music Philippines); Regine Velasquez –"Fantasy" (Universal Records; Sarah Geronimo – "One Heart" (Viva Records)	

=== Rock, Rap and Acoustic category ===
Rock Album of the Year	Rock Artist of the Year
**"Tropa" – Siakol (Synergy Music)**; "Contra Tiempo" – Sandwich (PolyEast Records); "Life" – Cueshé (Sony Music Philippines); "Overboard" – Frio (Synergy Music); "Pop Rockers" – Parokya ni Edgar (Universal Records); "Pula" – Mayonnaise (Viva Records); "Synergy" – Champ Lui Pio (PolyEast Records)	**Siakol – "Tropa" (Synergy Music)**; Champ Lui Pio – "Synergy" (PolyEast Records); Cueshé– "Life" (Sony Music Philippines); Frio – "Overboard" (Synergy Music); Mayonnaise – "Pula" (Viva Records); Parokya Ni Edgar – "Pop Rockers" (Universal Records); Sandwich – "Contra Tiempo" (PolyEast Records)
Rap Album of the Year	Rap Artist of the Year
**"Talumpati" – Gloc-9 (Sony Music Philippines)**; "Revolution" – Join The Quest (Cornerstone); "Tayo ang Bagay" – Aikee (PRP Records)	**Gloc 9 – "Talumpati" (Sony Music Philippines)**; Aikee – "Tayo Ang Bagay" (PRP Records); Quest – "Revolution" (Cornerstone)
Acoustic Album of the Year	Male Acoustic Artist of the Year
**"I Love Acoustic Too" – Sabrina (MCA Music)**; "Acoustic Princess" – Princess Velasco (Vicor Records); "Addicted to Acoustics 3" – Yssa Alvarez (Viva Records); "Cesar Montano" – Cesar Montano (Sony Music Philippines); "In You" – Nyoy Volante (MCA Music); "My Music, My Life" – Carol Banawa (Star Records); "Under Covers" – Suy (Ivory Music)	**Cesar Montano – "Cesar Montano" (Sony Music Philippines)**; Nyoy Volante – "In You" (MCA Music)
Female Acoustic of the Year	
**Sabrina – "I Love Acoustic" (MCA Music)**; Carol Banawa – "My Music, My Life" (Star Records); Princess Velasco – "Acoustic Princess" (Vicor Records); Suy – "Under Covers" (Ivory Music); Yssa Alvarez – "Addicted To Acoustic 3" (Viva Records)

=== Novelty category ===
Novelty Album of the Year	Novelty Song of the Year
**"Willing Willie" – Willie Revillame (Viva Records)**; "Fat Session" – Fat Session (Viva Records); "Todo Bigay" – Bayani Agbayani (Sony Music Philippines); "UnLi" – Blanktape (PolyEast Records)	**"Tantaran" – Willie Revillame (Viva Records)**; "Jejecall at Jejetext" – Blanktape (PolyEast Records); "Kung Sexy Lang Ako" – Fat Session (Viva Records); "Todo Bigay" – Bayani Agbayani (Sony Music Philippines)
Novelty Artist of the Year	
**Willie Revillame – "Willing Willie" (Viva Records)**; Bayani Agbayani – "Todo Bigay" (Sony Music Philippines); Blanktape – "Jejecall at Jejetext" (PolyEast Records); Fat Session – "Fat Session" (Viva Records)	

=== Album category ===
Alternative Album of the Year	Revival Album of the Year
**"RPG Metanoia" – Various artists (Star Records)**; "Ney (Dmac)" – Ney Dimaculangan (Star Records); "Pop Rockers" – Parokya ni Edgar (Universal Records); "3AM" – 3AM (Star Records)	**"The Classics Album" – Jed Madela (Universal Records)**; "Ang Awit ng Ating Buhay" – Vina Morales (Star Records); "Decades 2" – Piolo Pascual (Star Records); "Handog Ni Pidol" – Various artists (PolyEast Records); "Himig ng Damdamin" – Martin Nievera (PolyEast Records); "I'd Do Anything For Love" – Jovit Baldivino (Star Records); "Ngayon at Kailanman" – Ogie Alcasid (Universal Records)
Compilation Album of the Year	
**George Canseco Works" – Various artists (Viva Records)**; "Inspirations" – Jamie Rivera (Star Records); "Kris Aquino: My Heart's Journey" – Various artists (Universal Records); "Ngayong Pasko, Magniningning Ang Pilipino" – Various artists (Star Records); "Replay" – Gary Valenciano (Universal Records); "Willy Cruz Works" – Various artists (Viva Records); "60 Taong ng Musika at Soap Opera" – Various artists (Star Records)	

Note: There were no entries for RnB Album of the Year and Alternative Album of the Year.

=== Special awards ===
- Pilita Corrales Lifetime Achievement Awards: Nora Aunor
