= PMPC Star Award for Album of the Year =

Annual Philippine music award

- Country: Philippines
- Presented by: PMPC
- First award: 2009
- Final award: 2026
- Currently held by: James Reid – "jgh"

The PMPC Star Award for Album of the Year is one of the awards handed out at the yearly PMPC Star Awards for Music. The Album of the Year award is one of the most prestigious categories of the awards (alongside Song of the Year, Male Recording Artist of the Year, and Female Recording Artist of the Year). It was first awarded in 2009 and presented to Rico Blanco for his 2008 album Your Universe.

== Recipients ==
Ed. (Year)	Winner(s)	Work	Nominees	Ref.
1st (2009)	Rico Blanco	Your Universe	Biyaya – Bayang Barrios; Buhay – Rivermaya; Captured – Christian Bautista; OPM – Sarah Geronimo; The Itchyworms – The Itchyworms; Rebirth – Gary Valenciano	
2nd (2010)	Yeng Constantino	Lapit	Callalily – Callalily; KC – KC Concepcion; Maharlika – Kenyo; Now Playing – Juris; Project 6 Cyclemind – 6cyclemind	
3rd (2011)	Siakol	Tropa	All Me – Toni Gonzaga; Cesar Montano – Cesar Montano; Fantasy – Regine Velasquez; One Heart – Sarah Geronimo; Private Affair – Kyla; Talumpati – Gloc-9	
4th (2012)	Sponge Cola	Araw Oras Tagpuan	Awit Para Sa'yo – Erik Santos; Breathe Again – Jed Madela; Forevormore – Juris; No Water, No Moon – Bamboo; Outbound – Christian Bautista; Stay Alive – Nina	
5th (2013)	Gloc-9	Mga Kuwento Ng Makata	All Good – Nina; Flower Power – Callalily; Isang Pagkakataon – Marco Sison; Panatang Makabanda – Rivermaya; Sa Isang Sulyap Mo – 1:43; 3D Tatlong Dekada – Martin Nievera	
6th (2014)	Gloc-9	Liham At Lihim	Expressions – Sarah Geronimo; Hulog Ka ng Langit – Regine Velasquez; With You – Gary Valenciano; Jonalyn Viray – Jonalyn Viray; Ultrablessed – Sponge Cola; Spread The Love – Kris Lawrence	
7th (2015)	Toni Gonzaga	Celestine	All About Love – Yeng Constantino; Darren – Darren Espanto; Deeper – Julie Anne San Jose; Haymabu – Siakol; Never Alone – Jennylyn Mercado; Perfectly Imperfect – Sarah Geronimo	
8th (2016)	Alden Richards	Wish I May	Back To Love – Jolina Magdangal; Be With You – Darren Espanto; Bless This Mess – Bamboo; Marion – Marion Aunor; The Great Unknown – Sarah Geronimo; Nando'n Ako – Willie Revillame	
9th (2017)	Alden Richards	Say It Again	Chasing the Light – Julie Anne San Jose; Michael – Michael Pangilinan; Jona – Jona; Pogi Years Old – Parokya Ni Edgar; Soul Supremacy – KZ Tandingan; Sukli – Gloc-9	
10th (2018)	Moira Dela Torre	Malaya	Kapit – Christian Bautista; Klarisse – Klarisse de Guzman; Nakakalokal – Ogie Alcasid; Palm Dreams – James Reid; Sa Kabila ng Lahat – Rivermaya; This 15 Me – Sarah Geronimo	
11th (2020)	Jaya	Queen of Soul	Alon – Hale; Breakthrough – Julie Anne San Jose; Himig Handog 2018 – Various artists; Megastar – Sharon Cuneta; Sea of Lights – Sponge Cola; Sentimental – True Faith; Superhero – Jed Madela	
12th (2021)	Various artists	Himig Handog 2019	Amgo – John Roa; BobRey Live – Ken Chan and Rita Daniela; Evolution – Jake Zyrus; Feels Trip – Agsunta; Langit Mong Bughaw – December Avenue; Limasawa Street – Ben&Ben	
13th (2022)	Moira Dela Torre	Patawad	Himig Handog 11th Edition – Various artists; Huwag Matakot – This Band; Songbook – Rico Blanco; Umaga Live – The Juans and Janine Teñoso; Unplugged – Imago; Wildest Dreams – Nadine Lustre	
14th (2022)	SB19	Pagsibol	Borbolen – Parokya ni Edgar; Episode – Zack Tabudlo; Halfway Point – Moira Dela Torre; MPowered – Maymay Entrata; Pebble House, Vol. 1: Kuwaderno – Ben&Ben; Trophy – Morissette	
15th (2022)	The Juans	Liwanag	Angela Ken – Angela Ken; Be Us – BGYO; Feel Good - Bini; Looking Back – Lola Amour; Run To Me – Alexa Ilacad and KD Estrada	
16th (2024)	SB19	Pagtatag!	I Find Love So. So. Weird – Cool Cat Ash; Isapuso – Alamat; Sad Songs and Bullshits Part 1 – Juan Karlos; Songs From Home – Ogie Alcasid; Zack: For All – Zack Tabudlo	
17th (2026)	James Reid	jgh	Lola Amour – Lola Amour; Method Adaptor – Ely Buendia; MU – Arthur Miguel; Sariling Mundo – TJ Monterde; Talaarawan – Bini; The Traveller Across Dimensions – Ben&Ben	

== Artist with multiple awards ==
Two awards

- Alden Richards
- Gloc-9
- Moira Dela Torre
- SB19

== Artist with multiple nominations ==
Seven nominations

- Sarah Geronimo

Three nominations

- Christian Bautista
- Gloc-9
- Rivermaya

Two nominations

- Alden Richards
- Bamboo
- Ben&Ben
- Darren Espanto
- Gary Valenciano
- Jed Madela
- Jona
- Julie Anne San Jose
- Juris
- Lola Amour
- Moira Dela Torre
- Nina
- Ogie Alcasid
- Parokya ni Edgar
- Rico Blanco
- SB19
- Siakol
- Sponge Cola
- The Juans
- Toni Gonzaga
- Yeng Constantino
- Zack Tabudlo
