= Ethnic Faces =

Filipino rock band

- Genres: Alternative rock, new wave
- Years active: 1980s-present
- Labels: PolyEast Records (1995); Grey Market Records
- Members: Boyet Miguel; Jack Sikat; Jayvee Torres; Rhany Torres

Ethnic Faces is a Filipino alternative rock band from the 1980s. The band members are Jack Sikat on vocals, Rhany Torres on bass, Boyet Miguel on guitar, and Jayvee Torres on drums. They have 17 songs, including "Love", "Balikbayan", "Back Home" and "Golden Boy", and two albums, New Wave: 1986-1987 Recordings and Dekada. Their record labels are PolyEast Records and Grey Market Records.

Ethnic Faces gained national attention after winning a punk band contest on a noontime TV show.

== Discography ==
=== Albums ===
Year	Title	Catalog No.	Label
1995	Dekada	OCD-924 (CD) ORING 11.37 (cassette)	OctoArts International, Inc.
2022	New Wave - 1986–1987 Recordings	TGM-005	Grey Market Records

=== Compilation appearances ===
Year	Title	Songs	Catalog No.	Label
1985	Brave New World Live!	"Love", "Within Tribes"	TRC-02	Twisted Red Cross
1987	Subterranean Romance: Rise of the Martial Law Babies	"Golden Boy"		Instance Records
1989	10 of Another Kind	"Golden Boy", "Balikbayan"	CDP-94.569 (CD) P-94569 (LP, vinyl)	WEA Records Phils.
1990	Dear Cory	"A Soldier's Corner", "Brutal Scar"	DYP-86/38 (LP, vinyl) TC-DYP-86/38 (cassette)	Dyna Products Inc.
1995	Banda Mania	"Ubos Oras"		OctoArts International, Inc.
1996	L.A. Rock 105.9	"Parang Bowling"		Ivory Records (Tone Def)
2006	Pinoy Jam: 100% Homegrown Pinoy Alternative Rock	"Pusong Negro", "Within Tribes"	0094637657225	EMI Philippines
2014	Planet CD Compilation	"Hindi Tao, Hindi Hayop"	WSTCD 001	
