= Garth Garcia =

Filipino-American actor

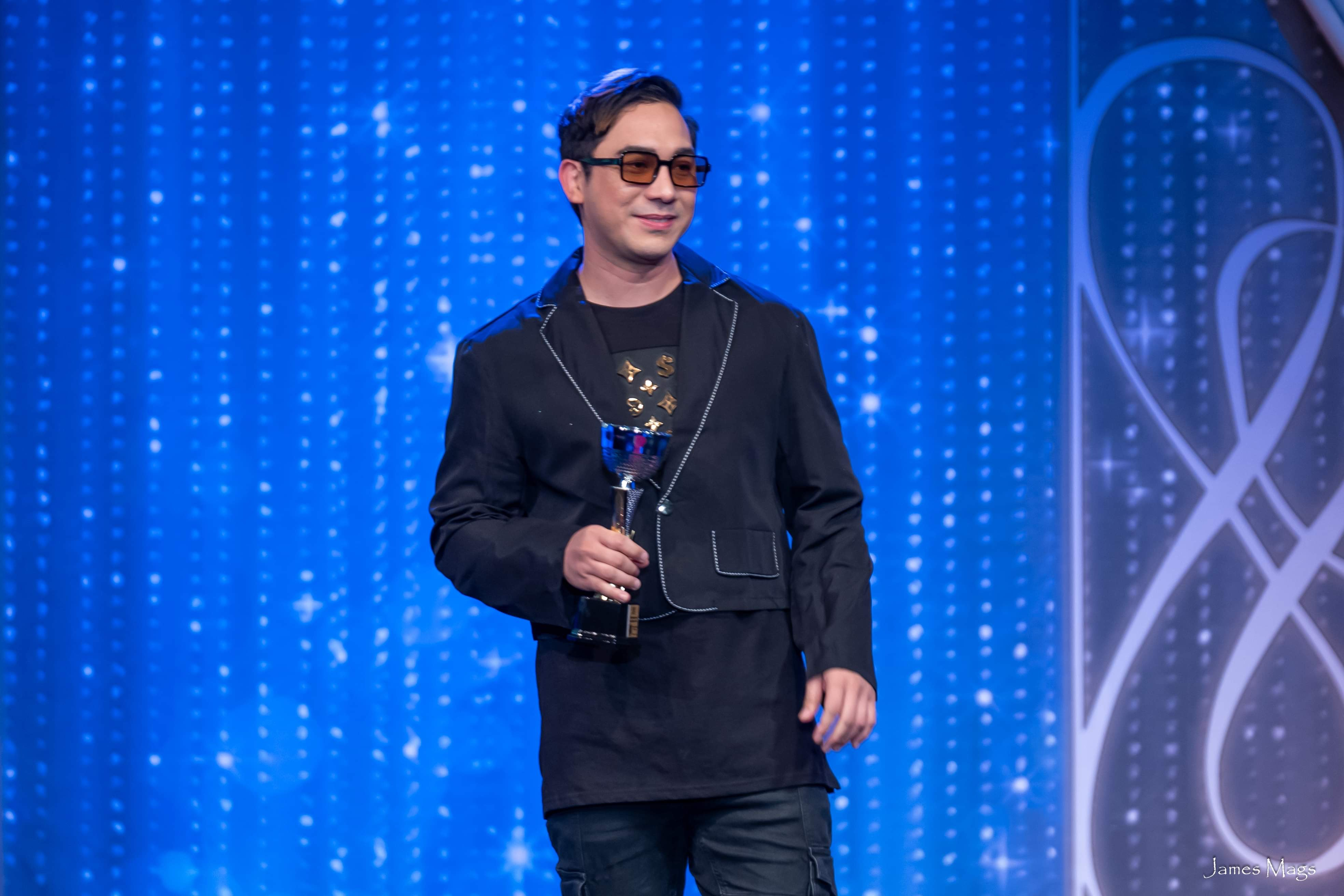
- Garcia in 2023
- Born: Garth Garcia Balasico
- Occupations: Singer; Producer
- Years active: 2014–present
- Musical career
- Origin: Philippines
- Genre: Pop
- Instruments: Vocals
- Label: Ivory Music and Video
- Website: garthgarcia.com

Garth Garcia Balasico, better known as Garth Garcia, is a Filipino-American singer, producer, and actor based in Los Angeles, California. He gained recognition as a finalist in the ABS-CBN reality singing competition Star in a Million in 2006.

== Life and career ==
Garcia's passion for music started at a young age, and he began singing in church choirs in Davao, where he grew up. He later moved to the capital city of Manila to pursue his dream of becoming a singer, and it was there that he joined "Star in a Million." Although he did not win the competition, Garcia impressed the judges and the audience with his vocal prowess and stage presence.

After "Star in a Million," Garcia signed with Ivory Music & Video. He released his debut album, "Garth Garcia," in 2014, which included the hit single "Masaya na akong iniwan mo". He also collaborated with other Filipino artists, such as Sheryn Regis, Jay R and Jaya.

In 2016, Garcia moved to Los Angeles to pursue a career in the American music industry. He continued to release music, including the singles "Wouldnt You" in 2017 and "Kick it" in 2019, and the EP "Collab Sessions" in 2019. He also collaborated with Grammy-nominated duo The Klubjumpers on the single "Together Again" in 2022.

He often makes bold statements on stage and in his music videos through his unique style. He has been featured in fashion magazines and has worked with designers such as Oliver Tolentino, Alexis Monsanto, Veejay Floresca, Kenneth Barlis and Carl Andrada.

In 2022, Garcia received recognition from The Outstanding Filipino Americans (TOFA) Awards,

Garcia has been signed to Ivory Music and Video in the Philippines and Starlink Music in the United States. He is also a member of the board at the Asian American Press Club of the US, which condemns Asian hate crimes in the country.

== Discography ==
=== Singles ===
Year	Title
2014	Masaya Na Akong Iniwan Mo
2017	Nilisan nang Pasko
2018	Take Over EP
2018	Wouldn't You
2019	Sa'yo
2019	Asian Girls
2020	Walang Mapapala
2020	Kick it
2020	Collab Sessions EP
2020	Bakit Malungkot ang Pasko
2021	Do You Miss Me
2021	Hits Reimagined EP
2021	The Christmas Song with Jay R
2022	Malabo
2022	Together Again with Grammy-nominated duo Klubjumpers
2022	Write a Song
2022	Lost
2022	Have Yourself a Merry little Christmas with Jaya (singer)
2023	Round Round
2023	Paint My Love with Lucho Beech and Juls King
2023	A Song for Mama with Kevin Hermogenes and Jasper Lacson
2023	Ipinapangako ko
2023	Kung Di mo ako Mahal
2023	Always in my Head which topped the U.S. iTunes Electronic Music chart in October 2023
2023	Kasadya Ning Taknaa
2024	Lifelines EP
2024	I Wanna Dance with Somebody with Tootsie Guevara
2024	Dancing Queen
2025	Ablaze
2025	Lifelines(Ginzee Remix)
2025	Almost Doesn't Count
2026	I still think of You
2026	Pangarap ng Puso
2026	Di Ko Alam with Kenneth Laurente and Cristiani Rebada

== Filmography ==
Year	Programs	Roles
2019	FILAMS in LA	Himself
2020	Garth Garcia feat. Moon Blue: Kick It	Himself
2021	So Jannelle	Himself
2022	Garth Garcia: Together Again	Himself
2024	No Room for Love	Matt
