= Arthur Miguel =

Filipino singer-songwriter (born 1999)

- Born: Arthur Miguel Quimpo; December 2, 1999 (age 26); San Jose del Monte, Bulacan
- Origin: Philippines
- Genres: Pop; OPM
- Occupations: Singer; songwriter; visual artist
- Years active: 2018–present
- Label: Warner Music Philippines

Arthur Miguel Quimpo (born December 2, 1999) is a Filipino singer-songwriter and visual artist. He was discovered when he first posting cover songs on YouTube in 2018. He gained popularity in 2023 with his song "Lihim" in which it debuted at number 23 Billboard Philippines Songs chart and peaked at number thirteen.

== Early life ==
Arthur Miguel Quimpo was born on December 2, 1999, in San Jose del Monte, Bulacan. He was a student in the CIIT College of Arts and Technology.

== Career ==
Arthur was discovered when he started posting his cover songs like Everything Has Changed & You Are The Reason. In December 2019, he posted his first original song, "Handa Na Ba?" featuring Caine, and released as independent in 2020.

In February 2020, he gained popularity on YouTube when he posted a cover from Nexxus, called "I'll Never Go". Because of his success, he signed a label with Warner Music Philippines in 2021.

He was a Taylor Swift fan, in which he also covered "Crazier" in 2021 on YouTube, in which later on released as a cover single on digital platforms on July 11, 2021.

Arthur gained widespread recognition in 2022 when he released "Ang Wakas" (lit. 'The End'), featuring Trisha Macapagal, and went viral on other digital platforms.

In May 2022, Arthur released his single, titled "Kupido" (lit. 'Cupid'). The following month, Arthur released his another single, titled "Huli". On October, Arthur released his debut album, titled "Pasahili". (Note: Shortened for 'para sa hindi pinili')

In July 2023, Arthur released his new single, "Lihim" (lit. 'Secret'). In which it became a viral on social media. On October, he went on to perform his viral hit "Lihim" on the second episode of Billboard Philippines Soundwave, after his song debuted at number 23 and peaked at number 11 on Billboard Philippines Songs. He also launched his gig series, titled "Ang Lihim ni Arthur" (lit. 'Arthur's Secret') on October.

In February 2024, Arthur and dwta released their collaboration single, titled "Tahan Na" (lit. 'Calm Down'). On the same year, Arthur released his two pre-singles, "Isaoras" and "Maling Panahon" (lit. 'Wrong Time') for his second extended play, MU. On May, he released his EP, MU. (Note: Acronym for "Malabong Usapan") On August, Arthur is one of the headliners to headline Warner Music Philippines' "We Play Here" on August 23 in University of the Philippines (UP) College of Science Amphitheater in Quezon City.

On February 26, 2025, Arthur and Filipino band Sugarcane embarked on a three-day tour across the Ayala Malls, beginning March 9 in Cebu and ended on March 29 in Tagaytay, as part of their "We Play Here" tour. In April, Arthur released his single titled "PDKL", (Note: Acronym for "Pwedeng Dito Ka Lang") following the release of his song titled "Pagitan" (lit. 'Between'), which was previously released in January.

== Artistry ==
Arthur cites musical influences like Taylor Swift. His songs like "Lihim" and "Pasahili" are inspired from Taylor's songwriting and is also present to his songs. He stated that "Whenever I listen to their songs, I get inspired to write more stories for my songs."

== Discography ==
=== Studio album ===
List of studio albums, with release date, label, and format shown
Title	Details	Ref.
Pasahili	Released: October 26, 2022; Label: Warner Music Philippines; Formats: Digital download, streaming	

=== Extended plays ===
List of extended plays, with release date, label, and format shown
Title	Album details
Kahapon	Released: October 11, 2020; Label: Warner Music Philippines; Formats: Digital download, streaming
MU	Released: May 10, 2024; Label: Warner Music Philippines; Formats: Digital download, streaming

=== Singles ===
List of singles, showing year released, selected chart positions, and associated albums
Title	Year	Peak chart positions	Album	Ref.
Title	Year	PHL	Album	Ref.
"Bitaw"	2020	—	Non-album singles	
"Handa Na Ba? (with Caine)"	2020	—	Non-album singles	
"Sana Mapansin"	2020	—	Non-album singles	
"Tadhana (with Trisha Macapagal)"	2020	—	Kahapon	
"Lagi Nalang"	2020	—	Kahapon	
"Kahapon"	2020	—	Kahapon	
"Sa Susunod"	2020	—	Kahapon	
"SIYA"	2021	—	Non-album singles	
"I'll Never Go"	2021	—	Non-album singles	
"Crazier" (Note: Cover version of the song by Taylor Swift)	2021	—	Non-album singles	
"Tangi"	2021	—	Non-album singles	
"Dito, Sa Ilalim Ng Buwan"	2021	—	Non-album singles	
"Ang Wakas (with Trisha Macapagal)" (original, or revisualized version)	2022	—	Pasahili	
"paraiso"	2022	—	Non-album singles	
"Bibitaw, aasa"	2022	—	Non-album singles	
"Kupido"	2022	—	Non-album singles	
"Huli"	2022	—	Non-album singles	
"Leron (with Trisha Macapagal)"	2022	—	Pasahili	
"Pasahili (para sa hindi pinili)"	2022	—	Pasahili	
"PAANO?"	2023	—	Non-album singles	
"Di Lahat Minamahal"	2023	—	Non-album singles	
"Walang Kapalit (AM VER.)" (Note: Cover version of the song by Rey Valera)	2023	—	Non-album singles	
"Lihim"	2023	11	Non-album singles	
"Your Universe" (Note: Cover version of the song by Rico Blanco)	2023	—	Non-album singles	
"Lihim (Nuarin Sasabihon) [with dwta]"	2023	—	Non-album singles	
"Bawat Taon"	2023	—	Non-album singles	
"Isaoras"	2024	—	MU	
"Maling Panahon"	2024	—	MU	
"Malabong Ugnayan (with jikamarie)"	2024	—	MU	
"GHINOST"	2024	—	MU	
"Dati"	2024	—	MU	
"Pagitan"	2025	—	Non-album singles	
"PDKL"	2025	—	Non-album singles	
"Sulyap"	2025	—	Non-album singles	

== Awards and nominations ==
Award ceremony	Year	Category	Recipient(s)	Result	Ref.
Awit Awards	2023	Best Global Collaboration Recording	"I Feel Good" (with Pink Sweats)	Won	
Wish Music Awards	2025	Wishclusive Ballad Performance of the Year	"Maling Panahon"	Nominated	
