= Dungaw =

Song by Gloc-9

Single by Gloc-9 featuring Keiko Necesario
- Language: Tagalog
- Released: September 13, 2019
- Recorded: 2019
- Genre: hip hop
- Length: 4:42
- Label: Aristotle Pollisco
- Composer(s): Aristotle Pollisco

Gloc-9 singles chronology
"Pati Pato" (2019)	"Dungaw" (2019)	"KKK (Kanya Kanyang Kayod)" (2019)

Keiko Necesario chronology

"Dungaw" (lit. 'To look out') is a song written and performed by Filipino rapper Gloc-9 and featuring Filipino indie singer Keiko Necesario. The song was released independently on September 13, 2019. The track features a wake from the perspective of the deceased who laments the injustices of life, culminating in an open letter addressed to God.

== Track listing ==
No.	Title	Length
1.	"Dungaw" (featuring Keiko Necesario)	4:42
