= Real Love Stories =

Real. Love. Stories.

Studio album by Jaya Ramsey
- Released: August 23, 2009
- Recorded: 2009
- Genres: R&B, soul, pop
- Label: GMA
- Producers: Felipe S. Yalung (EVP and COO); Buddy Medina (Executive Producer); Rene A. Salta (Managing Director)

Jaya Ramsey chronology
Cool Change (2007)	Real. Love. Stories. (2009)	All Souled Out (2011)

Singles from Real. Love. Stories.
- 1. "Hiding Inside Myself" Released: 2009; 2. "Real Love" Released: 2009; 3. "I Won't Last a Day Without You" Released: 2010; 4. "Breathe Again" Released: 2010

Real Love Stories (stylized as Real. Love. Stories.) is the tenth album of singer/actress/host Jaya Ramsey. It is a 14-track covers album produced and released by GMA Records on August 23, 2009, both on CD and digital format.

It is also her second album under the said recording company. The first one was Cool Change which earned a gold record award for its outstanding sales.

== Overview ==
Like its predecessor, Jaya's effort is a collection of cover songs composed of classic love ballads written and performed by international recording artists.

In this 14-track album, Jaya renders her own versions of carefully selected songs that tell stories of life, love, and all its other intricacies. Jaya wanted to sing some of her personal favorite songs. She cited two songs—"I Won't Last a Day Without You" and "All of My Life".

== Track listing ==
No.	Title	Writer(s)	Length
1.	"After All"	Al Jarreau	4:20
2.	"All of My Life"	Michael Randall	4:15
3.	"Anyone Can See"	Bruce Roberts, Irene Cara	3:43
4.	"Breathe Again"	Babyface	4:25
5.	"Finding Out the Hard Way"	Frank Stallone	3:33
6.	"Hiding Inside Myself"	Kenny Rankin	3:45
7.	"I Just Can't Let Go"	David Pack, David Robert	4:20
8.	"I Will Survive"	Freddie Perren, Dino Fekaris	4:31
9.	"I Won't Last a Day Without You"	Paul Williams	4:35
10.	"Maybe This Time"	Michael Martin Murphey	4:25
11.	"Old Friend"	Thom Bell, Linda Creed	4:49
12.	"Real Love"		4:34
13.	"Save the Best for Last"	Philip Galdstone, Jon Lind	4:15
14.	"You on My Mind"		4:44

== Personnel ==
- Buddy C. Medina – executive producer
- Kedy Sanchez – supervising album producer
- Rene A. Salta – marketing
- Dominic Benedicto – engineer, recording, mixing
- Nikki Cunanan – recording, mixing
- Jeff Felix – recording, mixing
