= Music and Me (Sarah Geronimo album) =

Studio album by Sarah Geronimo
- Released: December 22, 2009
- Recorded: 2005–2009
- Genre: Pop
- Length: 54:02
- Language: English
- Label: VIVA
- Producer: Christian De Walden

Sarah Geronimo chronology
OPM (2008)	Music and Me (2009)	One Heart (2011)

Singles from Music and Me
- 1. "Record Breaker (promo only)" Released: October 2009; 2. "Right Here Waiting" Released: January 2010; 3. "Please Be Careful with My Heart (with Christian Bautista)" Released: May 2010; 4. "Love Will Keep Us Together" Released: August 2010; 5. "Could've Been" Released: August 2010

Music and Me is the seventh studio album by Filipino singer Sarah Geronimo, released in the Philippines on December 22, 2009 by VIVA Records. The album consists of revivals of both foreign and OPM classics. It features four of Geronimo's past singles namely—"Can This Be Love", "Very Special Love", "You Changed My Life in a Moment" and "Something New in My Life"—all of which were used as soundtracks for Star Cinema films, which became box-office hits. Geronimo personally selected the tracks featured on the album. Also included on the album is "Record Breaker", a song from Geronimo's Sunsilk endorsement.

The album was made available on digital download through iTunes on July 5, 2009. It reached platinum status after a month of its release, eventually selling 20,000 copies. In August 2010, "Love Will Keep Us Together" was included on the album as a bonus track.

== Track listing ==
No.	Title	Original artist(s)	Length
1.	"Right Here Waiting"	Richard Marx	4:10
2.	"Lost in Your Eyes"	Debbie Gibson	3:34
3.	"Can This Be Love" (theme song from Can This Be Love)	Smokey Mountain	3:43
4.	"Listen to Your Heart"	Roxette	3:51
5.	"Have You Ever?"	Brandy	4:30
6.	"Please Be Careful with My Heart" (with Christian Bautista)	Jam Morales/Jose Mari Chan and Regine Velasquez	3:36
7.	"Fall for You"	Shanice	5:28
8.	"Could've Been"	Tiffany	3:36
9.	"Before I Fall in Love"	Coco Lee; Joanne Pennock	3:46
10.	"You Changed My Life in a Moment" (theme song from You Changed My Life)	Janie Fricke	3:30
11.	"Never Gonna Let You Go"	Faith Evans	4:27
12.	"Something New in My Life" (theme song from In My Life)	Stephen Bishop	3:07
13.	"Very Special Love" (theme song from A Very Special Love)	Maureen McGovern	4:01
14.	"Record Breaker" (theme song from Sunsilk)		2:36

Re-release bonus track
No.	Title	Original artist(s)	Length
15.	"Love Will Keep Us Together" (theme song from Hating Kapatid)	Neil Sedaka
16.	"This Is My Dream" (theme song from Superstar.PH)

== Release history ==
Country	Release date	Format
Philippines	December 22, 2009	Standard (CD)
United States	July 5, 2009	Standard (download)

== Awards ==
- ASAP POP VIEWER'S CHOICE AWARDS 2010:

Pop Album Pop Music Video (Right Here Waiting) Pop Movie Soundtrack: (Love Will Keep Us Together)

- PMPC STAR AWARDS FOR MUSIC:

Best Female Recording Artist (For Music And Me)

== Certifications ==
Country	Provider	Certification	Sales
Philippines	PARI	Platinum	20,000+
