= Your Universe =

Studio album by Rico Blanco
- Released: August 8, 2008; January 2010 (Southeast Asian version); April 13, 2011 (+ Kahit Walang Sabihin 2 CD Version); June 28, 2019 (Vinyl Version release)
- Genres: Alternative rock, electronic rock, synthpop, symphonic rock, pop punk
- Length: 44:45
- Label: Warner Music Philippines
- Producer: Jim Baluyot

Rico Blanco chronology
Your Universe (2008)	Galactik Fiestamatik (2012)

Singles from Your Universe
- 1. "Yugto" Released: June 12, 2008; 2. "Your Universe" Released: November 14, 2008; 3. "Antukin" Released: May 14, 2009; 4. "Bangon" Released: October 12, 2009; 5. "Ayuz" Released: December 8, 2009; 6. "Neon Lights" Released: May 8, 2010; 7. "Kahit Walang Sabihin" Released: April 8, 2011

Your Universe is the debut album by former Rivermaya frontman, Rico Blanco, released in 2008. A vinyl version of the album were released on July 28, 2019.

== Overview ==
After announcing his departure on Rivermaya, Rico went on a year-long leave from the local music scene and toured the US and Europe. On June 12, 2008 he returned to the music scene and released his debut single "Yugto". The album "Your Universe" was in the works and was released the following month.

== Track listing ==
All tracks are written by Rico Blanco.

Your Universe track listing
No.	Title	Length
1.	"Say Forever"	04:10
2.	"Your Universe"	03:58
3.	"Yugto"	05:25
4.	"Ayuz"	05:01
5.	"Helpless"	03:10
6.	"Start Again"	04:15
7.	"Outta This"	05:45
8.	"Para Hindi Ka Mawala"	03:21
9.	"Antukin"	04:48
10.	"Metropolis"	04:52

Deluxe + Kahit Walang Sabihin 2-disc Set
No.	Title	Length
11.	"Neon Lights"
12.	"Your Universe" (Acoustic Version)
13.	"Bangon"
14.	"Kahit Walang Sabihin"

== Personnel ==
- Rico Blanco - Guitars, Bass, Drums, Piano, Synths, Programming
- Nathan Azarcon - Bass on "Your Universe"
- Buddy Zabala - Bass on "Say Forever"
- Cynthia Alexander - Bass on "Yugto"
- Louie Talan - Bass on "Yugto"
- Rommel dela Cruz - Bass on "Ayuz" and "Yugto"
- Nick Azarcon - Jam Guitars on "Ayuz"
- Junjun Regalado - Drums
- Otep Concepcion - Drums on "Yugto"
- Boyet Aquino - Drums on "Yugto"
- Wendell Garcia - Drums on "Your Universe"
- Paolo Santiago - Drums on "Say Forever"
- Archie Lacorte - Sax on "Say Forever"
- Jack Rufo - Co-arranged the song "Start Again"
- Strings: Denise Huang, Rachelle Alcances, Ma. Christina & Ed Pasamba on "Your Universe"
- String Arrangement by: Arnold Buena on "Your Universe"
- Special Thanks to: Alan Feliciano on "Your Universe"
- Choir Vox: Rico Blanco; Choir: Rico Blanco, Mark Villena, Frey Zambrano, Paolo Santiago on "Yugto"
- Horns: Archie Lacorte, Precious dela Cruz, Gilbert Francisco, Lowel Lalic of Brass Monkeys on "Ayuz"
- Strings: Denise Huang, Rechelle Alcances, Ma. Cristina & Ed Pasamba on "Yugto"
- Horn Section: Wowie Ansano & Fards Tupas of Radioactive Sago Project on "Yugto"
- Strings Arranged by: Rico Blanco notated and conducted by: Arnold Buena on "Yugto"
