= Vehnee Saturno =

Filipino sonngwriter

- Born: Venancio A. Saturno; April 1, 1954 (age 72); Iloilo City, Philippines
- Origin: Cabuyao, Laguna, Philippines
- Genres: OPM, Pop, CCM
- Occupations: Composer, songwriter, record producer
- Years active: 1982–present

Venancio Saturno (born April 1, 1954), better known as Vehnee Saturno, is a Filipino composer, songwriter and record producer. He found success in 1982 by winning first place at the Metro Manila Popular Music Festival for the song "Isang Dakot".

== Early life ==
Saturno was born in Iloilo City on April 1, 1954, to a carpenter and a housewife who struggled together with his nine siblings with poverty which inspired him to write songs.

His dream was to be a journalist, but due to his family's financial situation he was not able to finish his studies. He trained at the Philippine Air Force after high school and eventually did odd jobs including working as a photocopy machine operator.

== Music career ==
In 1982, his composition "Isang Dakot" was interpreted by Sonia Singson which won the Grand Prize at the Metropop. In 1983, "Be My Lady" was interpreted by Pedrito Montaire and became a finalist at the Metropop; this song was his first major big hit when it was recorded by Martin Nievera and was released under Vicor Music.

His songs "Be My Lady", "Sana Kahit Minsan", "Mula sa Puso" and "'Till My Heartaches End", "Nag-iisang Ikaw", "Sana Kahit Minsan" became hits in the Philippines. In the late 1990s, Saturno produced hits for female artists Jessa Zaragoza (for her album Just Can't Help Feelin') and Jaya (for the album In the Raw) and in 2001, for Rachel Alejandro.

Saturno also owns his own music label, Vehnee Saturno Music Corp. He often writes songs and manages artists through this label.

In 2024, Saturno composed the theme song for the Philippines' participation in the 2024 Summer Olympics titled "Isangdaan Taong Laban para sa Bayan" (transl. A hundred-year fight for the people), as well as the theme song "Hamon" for the biographical film Mamay: A Journey to Greatness.

== Awards and nominations ==
| Year | Awards | Category | Result |
|---|---|---|---|
| 1982 | Metro Manila Popular Music Festival | Best composition (Isang Dakot) | Won |
| 1983 | Metro Manila Popular Music Festival | Best composition (Ako'y Ako) | Nominated |
| 1983 | Metro Manila Popular Music Festival | Best composition (Be My Lady) | Nominated |
| 1995 | FAMAS Award | Best Musical Score | Won |
| 1995 | FAP Awards | Best Musical Score | Won |
| 1995 | FAP Awards | Best Original Song | Won |
| 1996 | Star Awards for Movies | Musical Scorer of the Year | Won |
| 1996 | Gawad Urian Award | Best Music | Nominated |
| 1996 | FAP Awards | Best Original Song | Won |
| 1996 | FAMAS Award | Best Movie Theme Song | Nominated |
| 1996 | FAMAS Award | Best Musical Score | Won |
| 2000 | FAP Awards | Best Original Theme Song | Won |
| 2001 | FAP Awards | Best Original Song | Won |
| 2001 | FAMAS Award | Best Theme Song | Won |
