= Ivory Music and Video =

Record label in the Philippines

- Parent company: Independent (1983–2023); Viva Music Group (2023–present)
- Founded: August 11, 1983; 43 years ago
- Founder: Steven Tan; Tony Ocampo
- Status: Active
- Distributor: Self-distributed
- Genre: OPM
- Country of origin: Philippines
- Location: 7/F East Tower, Tektite Towers, Exchange Road, Ortigas Center, Pasig, Metro Manila
- Official website: Ivory Music & Video on Facebook

Ivory Music and Video, Inc. (formerly Ivory Records Corporation) is a Philippine record label owned by Viva Music Group, a subsidiary of Viva Communications.

The label works with OPM veteran artists and bands/groups such as the Company, Side A, Wolfgang, MYMP, Roselle Nava and April Boy Regino, as well as contemporary artists like Maja Salvador and Silent Sanctuary.

Ivory Music and Video also released video karaoke VCDs versions of the label's songs in the Philippines. The label handled the catalog for Sony Music Entertainment in the Philippines from July 2011 until February 2018.

== History ==
Tony Ocampo set up Ivory Music and Video (as Ivory Records at that time) on August 11, 1983. The name came from the fact that he and his siblings were encouraged by their parents to play the piano. Ivory started operations by licensing products for Victor Musical Industries and Enigma Records. Not long after, they started to shift its focus to homegrown music by signing up Asin, Ketama, the Company and Roselle Nava, among others.

Ivory gave birth to rising acoustic group MYMP in 2003 when iFM management led by Raymund Ryan saw their gig and it caught Ivory's attention. In that same year during their 20th anniversary, they welcomed Marielle and broadcast journalist Love Anover to their roster and moved its offices from the Quad Center Building in Ortigas Avenue, San Juan to the Dona Parel Building at the Aurora Boulevard in Quezon City until sometime in early 2018. By that same period, they handled distribution for some releases of GMA Records until sometime in 2007.

The label began handling distribution for the catalog of Sony Music in the Philippines on July 1, 2011, as part of the Philippine branch's downsize in operations. Eventually, Sony Music Philippines closed its operations after a long battle with widespread piracy in February 2012. Years later, Ivory Music launched its digital label and talent management unit, Enterphil Entertainment.

Updates on the artists of Sony Music were phased out from their social media pages by January 2018, and it was apparent that the distribution deal with Sony Music had been expired by that time as Sony Music was preparing for the resumption of its operations in the Philippines.

The label, ahead of its 40th anniversary celebration in 2023, formally launched a new batch of artists like CJ Navato, Nonoy Pena, Karl Zarate, Meg Zurbito, Leann Ganzon, and bands like Stereotype.

On June 30, 2023, Viva Communications acquired Ivory Music, making this record label, the fifth flagship label under Viva.

== Artists ==
=== Current ===
- Amiel Sol (since 2024)
- Cuatro
- Ferodina
- GAT
- Kylu
- Meg Zurbito
- Quaderno
- Yana and Yna (since 2026)

=== Former ===
- Abet Alfonso
- AC Bonifacio (2018–21)
- Ai-Ai Delas Alas
- Alecx Estrada
- Alex Catedrilla
- Alvin Nunez
- Arlene Salvado (1999–2002)
- April Boys (1993–1994)
- April Boy Regino (1995–2002; deceased)
- Asin
- Bambi Perez
- Bert Del Rosario
- Bethel Shima
- Bing Rodrigo
- Blanktape
- Blind Stereo Moon (2019–21)
- Bo Sanchez (2013–16)
- Bobby Duran
- Boom
- Bryan Termulo (2017–23)
- Camille Victoria
- Carol Claire
- Carlo Aquino (2019–22)
- Cheri
- Chris Tsuper and Nicole Hyala (2007–10)
- CJ Navato (2019–20)
- The Company (1990–96)
- Crazymix (2020–23)
- Dagtang Lason (2009–11)
- Darwin Monteclar (2000–02)
- David Archuleta (2012)
- Dayaw
- Defoe (1999–2001)
- Donna Bay
- DJ Myke Salomon (2009–11)
- Edgar Allan Guzman (2014–17)
- Eevee (2017–23)
- Erectus
- Ethnic Faces
- Eugene Villaluz
- Eva Alejo
- Eva Regino
- Florante
- Freddie Aguilar
- Freshmen
- Gary Granada
- Garth Garcia
- Geca Morales (2021–23)
- Gerald Santos (2011–15)
- Gerry Lara
- Gravity
- Idonnah Villarico
- Iktus (2017–23)
- Isla Era (2005–07)
- Iza Calzado (2014–16)
- Jab
- Jason Fernandez (2012–13)
- Jayson Martinez
- JC de Vera (2016–17)
- Jennylyn Mercado (2016–18)
- JM de Guzman (2011–13)
- Join the Club
- John Lesaca
- John Melo
- Jojo Abellana
- Josh Yape
- Joy & Bevs (2004–06)
- Joyce Versoza
- Julia Clarete (2005–08)
- Kaligta (2012–15)
- Karl Zarate (2020–23)
- Keith Cruz
- Ketama (1995–98)
- Kim Flores (2005-2007)
- L.A. Lopez (1992–94)
- Leann Ganzon (2021–23)
- Lianne Loren
- Lilet (2003–05; as Marielle)
- Lokal Brown
- Love Anover (2003–06)
- Louie Reyes
- Luke Mejares (2012–13)
- Madeline (2019–22)
- Maja Salvador (2014–19)
- Manilyn Reynes
- Martin Avila (1996)
- M.C. Lara and the Rapbusters
- Melodia
- Michelle Ramirez
- Mix Fenix (2021–23)
- Moira Dela Torre (2014–17)
- Moira Lacambra
- Moonstar88 (2012–14)
- MYMP (2003–09, 2018–22)
- Myrtle Sarrosa (2015–17)
- Necie Lacson
- Nerissa
- Nerveline (2005–07)
- Nonoy Pena (2021–23)
- Olivia
- Orient Pearl
- Pal Villaluz
- Paolo Santos (2008–12)
- Part III (2011–13)
- Patrick Cuneta
- Paullete
- Pen-Pen
- Pilita Corrales
- Puro
- Rey Salac
- Riva Quenery (2018–21)
- Rodel Naval
- Ron Antonio
- Room for Cielo (2019–20)
- Roselle Nava (1993–97)
- Rudy Lozano
- Ryan Christopher (2014–17)
- Ryzza Mae Dizon (2012–14)
- Sampaguita
- Sandiwa (2019–23)
- Sharlene San Pedro (2018–21)
- Side A (1985–91, 2018–20)
- Silent Sanctuary (2013–17)
- Simpatiko (2018–20)
- The Small World Children's Choir (formerly known as The Small World Children's Club) (1987–2000)
- Stereotype (2019–22)
- Suy Galvez
- Syato
- Tangerine
- Tank B Music
- Ted Ito
- The End
- The OPM Hitmen (Renz Verano, Richard Reynoso, Rannie Raymundo, and Chad Borja) (2018–21)
- The Triplet – Filipino female vocal trio consisting of Manilyn Reynes, Tina Paner, and Sheryl Cruz.
- Thor Dulay (2005–09)
- Troy Montero (2004–06)
- Vernon De Leon
- Vic Robinson
- Virna Lisa
- Wolfgang (1994–96)
- Young Men (2009–10)
- Zack Tabudlo (2014–18)

==== Enterphil Entertainment ====
- Aicelle Santos
- Carleen Sky Aclan
- Cherryz Mendoza
- Chris Sta. Romana
- The Cokeheads
- Erika Mae Salas
- Marquiss
- Maxine Tiongson
- Mei Cruz
- Nitoy Maliliin
- Patrisha Samson
- Via Saroca
