= Noel Cabangon =

- Born: Noel Genetiano Cabangon; December 25, 1963 (age 62); Rosario, La Union, Philippines
- Genres: Folk
- Occupations: Singer, Composer
- Instruments: Vocals, guitar
- Years active: 1982–present
- Formerly of: Buklod

Noel Genetiano Cabangon (born December 25, 1963) is a Filipino folk singer and composer, known for composing socially-relevant songs. In 1987, he formed the group Buklod together with Rene Boncocan and Rom Dongeto.

== Early life and education ==
Noel Gadiano Cabangon was born on December 25, 1963, in Rosario, La Union. At the age of ten, he began his musical career and learned to play the guitar that he borrowed from a neighbor. He made a name for himself in the local music scene in 1982 beginning in little-known folk houses and bars. He graduated from the Philippine Women's University with a degree in Bachelor of Music Popular Music in 2024.

== Music career ==
In 1987, he formed the group Buklod together with Rene Boncocan and Rom Dongeto. They produced three albums: Bukid at Buhay, Tatsulok, and Sa Kandungan ng Kalikasan. The band wrote and performed songs about the environment, human rights, and politics.

After the group disbanded, Noel Cabangon went on to record six solo albums; perform solo at music bars and private events; compose songs for the movies and for other artists; and enter the local theater industry as a musical director, as a composer or sometimes as an actor.

He wrote the book Ang Bayan Ko at Lupa: Awit ng Diwa in 2005, and co-authored Ako'y Isang Mabuting Pilipino (I Am A Good Filipino) in 2012.

Cabangon played Jesus Christ in a local production of Jesus Christ Superstar in 2000.

== Discography ==
=== Albums ===
- Pasakalye (2000)
- Huwag Mangamba (Mga Awit Ng Pagtatagpo) (2002)
- Himig Nating Pag-ibig (2006)
- Byahe (2009)
- Panaginip (2011)
- Tuloy Ang Byahe (2012)
- Acoustic Noel (2014)
- Sa'Yo Lamang: Papuri At Inspirasyon (2016)

== Awards and nominations ==
Award	Song title	Award giving body	Date	Result
Best Folk-Pop Recording	Dito Sa Kanto	Awit Award	2000	Won
Best Performance by a Male Recording Artist	Kahit Maputi na ang Buhok ko	Awit Award	2010	Won
Best World Music Recording	Binibini	Awit Award	2010	Won
Best Song Written for Movie/TV/Stage Play	Ang Buhay nga Naman	Awit Award	2010	Won
Album of the Year	Byahe	Awit Award	2010	Won
Album of the Year	Panaginip	Awit Award	2012	Won
Best Christmas Recording	Pasko Ng Pagbibigayan	Awit Award	2012	Won
Best Regional Recording	Usahay	Awit Award	2013	Won
