= GMA Music =

Record label division of GMA Network

- Parent company: GMA Network Inc.
- Founded: 1995; 31 years ago
- Distributors: RGMA Marketing and Productions Inc.
- Genre: Various
- Country of origin: Philippines
- Location: GMA Network Center, EDSA corner Timog Avenue, Diliman, Quezon City, Philippines
- Official website: gmanetwork.com/records

GMA Productions, Inc., doing business as GMA Music (formerly known as Infiniti Music and GMA Records), is a Philippine record label owned and operated by GMA Network Inc. It is engaged in the production, marketing, and distribution of music and concerts. GMA Music is a member of PARI and has the distinction of having two Diamond Record awards in the highly competitive music scene.

== Current artists ==
Male

- Alden Richards
- Anthony Rosaldo
- Apl.de.ap (since 2026)
- Derrick Monasterio
- Janno Gibbs (2004–18, since 2025)
- JC Regino
- Jeremiah Tiangco
- Jeric Gonzales
- Ken Chan
- Kristofer Martin
- King Girado (since 2026)
- Migo Adecer
- Ruru Madrid

Female

- Angel Guardian
- Arra San Agustin
- Barbie Forteza
- Bianca Umali
- Golden Cañedo
- Jessica Villarubin
- Jillian Ward
- Kyline Alcantara
- Maricris Garcia
- Mariane Osabel
- Mikee Quintos
- Princess Velasco
- Sanya Lopez
- Ysabel Ortega
- Zephanie Dimaranan

== Former artists ==
- Aicelle Santos (2005–14)
- Bryan Chong (2019–21)
- Gerald Santos (2006–11)
- Dingdong Avanzado (1996–99)
- Frencheska Farr (2009–16)
- Gary Granada
- Geoff Taylor (2009–11)
- James Wright (2013–16)
- Jaya (2007–11)
- Jessa Zaragoza (2012–14)
- Jolina Magdangal (2004–09)
- Jona (2005–13)
- Julie Anne San Jose (2012–17, 2020)
- Kitchie Nadal (2007–08)
- Kris Lawrence (2012–14)
- Nar Cabico (2016–18)
- Sunshine Cruz (1999–2000)
- The Tux
- Top One Project (2016–19)
- Willie Revillame (2015–22)
- Yasmien Kurdi (2005–08)
- YMAN

== Compilations of GMA Music ==
- All About Love (2009)
- Isang Kinabukasan: A Kapuso Benefit Album (collaboration with GMA Kapuso Foundation) (2007)
- Tunog Kapuso: The Best of GMA TV Themes Vol. 1 (2005)
- Metropop Song Festival compilation album (1996–2002)
- Mga Awit Kapuso Vol. 5 (2008)
- Mga Awit Mula Sa Puso: The Best of GMA TV Themes Vol. 2 (2006)
- Mga Awit ng Kapuso: The Best of GMA TV Themes Vol. 3 (2007)
- Mga Awiting Kapuso: Best of GMA TV Soundtracks Vol. 4 (2008)
- Mga Awit Mula Sa Puso: The Best of GMA TV Themes Vol. 6 (2013)
- Mga Awit Kapuso Volume 7 (2016)
- Kapuso Sa Pasko: The GMA Records All Star Christmas Album (2005)
- Pinoy Pop Superstar Grand Contender Vol. 1 (2005)
- Pinoy Pop Superstar Grand Contender Vol. 2 (2006)
- Pinoy Pop Superstar Grand Contender Vol. 3 (2007)
- Seasons of Love: The Best of Mga Awit Kapuso Vol. 7 (2014)
- The Best Of Mga Awit Kapuso (2009)
- Awit Kapuso: Kay Sarap Maging Kapuso (2011)
- Take1: The Best Of Awit Kapuso Originals (2013)

== Movie soundtracks on GMA Music ==
- Mulawin The Movie Soundtrack (2005)
- Lovestruck (2008)
- Moments Of Love (2006)
- Pers Lab: The Music of First Time (2010)
- Tween Academy: Class of 2012 (Official Movie Soundtrack) (2011)

== GMA Records Home Video ==
=== Movies and TV movies ===
Some movies are released with GMA Films partners (most being Regal Entertainment or Viva Films) but the following are solely released by GMA Records Home Video:

- Deathrow
- DOSENA: Bubble Gang Movie For TV
- I Wanna Be Happy
- Imagine You and Me
- Jose Rizal
- Just One Summer
- Let The Love Begin
- Ligalig
- Lovestruck
- Moments Of Love
- Michael V.: The Bubble G. Anthology
- My Kontrabida Girl
- Panaghoy Sa Suba
- Pitong Tagpo
- Ploning
- Sa Pusod Ng Dagat
- Temptation Island
- The Road
- The Witness
- Tween Academy: Class of 2012
- San Lazaro
- Sosy Problems

=== TV series ===
- Amaya
- Adik Sa'Yo
- Ang Babaeng Hinugot sa Aking Tadyang
- Ang Mahiwagang Baul
- Asian Treasures
- Bayan Ko
- Carmela
- Dyesebel
- Encantadia
- Endless Love
- First Time
- Forever in My Heart
- Genesis
- I ♥ You, Pare!
- Ilustrado
- Kung Mamahalin Mo Lang Ako
- Lupin
- MariMar
- Mulawin
- My Favorite Recipes
- My Husband's Lover
- Munting Heredera
- Pepito Manaloto
- Quickfire: 10 Minute Kitchen Wonders
- Rosalinda
- Saang Sulok ng Langit
- Stairway to Heaven
- Totoy Bato
- The Best Of Bubble Gang
- The Best Of Yari Ka!: Bitoy's Funniest Videos

== Sub-labels ==
- AltG Records
- GMA Playlist
- GMV Studios (partnership with Viva Records)
