= List of awards and nominations received by Gloc-9 =

Gloc-9 awards and nominations
Awards and nominations
Award	Wins	Nominations
Awit Awards	21	34
FAMAS Awards	1	1
Globe Tatt Awards	1	1
GMMSF Box-Office Entertainment Awards	1	1
Katha Music Awards	1	1
MMFF Awards	1	1
MTV Pilipinas Music Awards	1	1
MOR Pinoy Music Awards	0	1
Myx Music Awards	18	45
Philippine Hip-Hop Awards	5	5
PMPC Star Awards for Music	9	18
Tambayan 101.9 OPM Awards	1	2
USTv Students' Choice Awards	1	1
Waki OPM Awards 101.9	1	1
Wave891 Urban Music Awards	1	3
Wish 107.5 Music Awards	0	4
Yahoo! (Philippines) Celebrity Awards (formerly Yahoo! OMG! Awards)	0	3

Totals (Note: Certain award groups do not simply award one winner. They acknowledge several different recipients, have runners-up, and have third place. Since this is a specific recognition and is different from losing an award, runner-up mentions are considered wins in this award tally. For simplification and to avoid errors, each award in this list has been presumed to have had a prior nomination.)
- Wins: 63
- Nominations: 123

Gloc-9 has received numerous awards in his career. Most of his awards came from Myx Music Awards, Awit Awards and PMPC Star Awards for Music. Below is a list of all the notable awards he has received:

== Awit Awards ==
Year	Nominee / work	Award	Result
2002	"Isang Araw"	Best Rap Recording	Won
2003	"Pasko Na Naman"	Best Christmas Song	Won
2008	"Lando" (with Francis Magalona)	Best Rap Recording	Won
2008	"Lando" (with Francis Magalona)	Best Performance by a Duet	Nominated
2008	"Sumayaw Ka"	Best Dance Recording	Won
2010	"Upuan"	Best Rap Recording	Won
2010	"Upuan"	Song of the Year	Won
2010	"Upuan"	Best Collaboration Performance	Won
2010	"Upuan"	Best Engineered Recording	Won
2010	"Upuan"	Best Musical Arrangement	Nominated
2010	"Upuan"	Texters' Choice for Song of the Year	Nominated
2010	"Martilyo"	Best Rock/Alternative Recording	Won
2012	"Walang Natira" (with Sheng Belmonte)	Song of the Year	Nominated
2012	"Walang Natira" (with Sheng Belmonte)	Best Rap Recording	Won
2012	"Walang Natira" (with Sheng Belmonte)	Best Collaboration Performance	Won
2012	"Walang Natira" (with Sheng Belmonte)	Best Engineered Recording	Nominated
2012	"Walang Natira" (with Sheng Belmonte)	Music Video of the Year	Nominated
2013	"Sirena" (with Ebe Dancel)	Best Collaboration	Nominated
2013	"Sirena" (with Ebe Dancel)	Song of the Year	Won
2013	"Sirena" (with Ebe Dancel)	Best Rap Recording	Nominated
2013	"Sirena" (with Ebe Dancel)	Music Video of the Year	Won
2013	"Bagsakan" (with Parokya ni Edgar and Frank Magalona)	Best Rap Recording	Nominated
2013	MKNM: Mga Kwento Ng Makata	Album of the Year	Won
2014	"Magda" (with Rico Blanco)	Best Collaboration	Won
2014	"Magda" (with Rico Blanco)	Song of the Year	Won
2014	"Magda" (with Rico Blanco)	Best Rap Recording	Won
2014	"Magda" (with Rico Blanco)	Music Video of the Year	Nominated
2014	Liham at Lihim	Album of the Year	Won
2014	"Kunwari" (with Kamikazee, Biboy Garcia of Queso and Manuel Legarda of Wolfgang)	Best Rock/Alternative Recording	Nominated
2014	"Ang Parokya" (with Parokya ni Edgar and Frank Magalona)	Best Performance by a Group Recording Artists	Won
2014	"Papel" (with Joey Ayala and Denise Barbacena)	Best Novelty Recording	Won
2014	"Papel" (with Joey Ayala and Denise Barbacena)	Best World Music Recording	Nominated
2015	"Businessman" (with Vinci Montaner)	Best R&B Recording	Nominated
2016	"Ang Probinsyano" (with Ebe Dancel)	Best Song Written for Movie/TV/Stage Play	Won

== FAMAS Awards ==
Year	Nominee/Work	Award	Result	Ref.
2012	"Hari ng Tondo" (from Manila Kingpin: The Asiong Salonga Story) (with Denise Barbacena)	Best Theme Song	Won	
2015	"Hindi Pa Tapos" (from Bonifacio: Ang Unang Pangulo)	Best Original Theme Song	Won	
2015	"Asintado" (from Asintado)	Best Original Theme Song	Nominated	

== Globe Tatt Awards ==
Year	Nominee / work	Award	Result
2012	Himself	Indie Rocker	Won

== GMMSF Box-Office Entertainment Awards ==
Year	Nominee / work	Award	Result
2015	Himself	Male Recording Artist of the Year	Won

== Golden Screen Awards ==
Year	Nominee / work	Award	Result
2012	"Hari ng Tondo" (from Manila Kingpin: The Asiong Salonga Story) (with Denise Barbacena)	Best Original Song	Nominated

== Katha Awards ==
Year	Nominee / work	Award	Result
2002	"Isang Araw"	Best Rap Recording	Won

== Metro Manila Film Festival Awards ==
Year	Nominee/Work	Award	Result	Ref.
2014	"Hindi Pa Tapos" (from Bonifacio: Ang Unang Pangulo) (with Denise Barbacena)	Best Original Theme Song	Won	

== MOR Pinoy Music Awards ==
Year	Nominee/Work	Award	Result	Ref.
2019	"Nanay, Tatay" with (Darren Espanto & Anne Curtis)	Best Collaboration of the Year	Nominated	

== MTV Pilipinas Awards ==
Year	Nominee / work	Award	Result
2005	"Sayang"	Video of the Year	Won

== MYX Music Awards ==
Year	Nominee / work	Award	Result
2006	"Tula"	Favorite Urban Video	Won
2006	"Koro"(with Greyhoundz and Francis M.)	Favorite Collaboration	Nominated
2008	"Lando" (with Francis M.)	Favorite Urban Video	Nominated
2008	"Lando" (with Francis M.)	Favorite Collaboration	Nominated
2008	Himself	Favorite Male Artist	Nominated
2008	Himself	Favorite Myx Live! Performance	Nominated
2010	"Kasalanan" (with 6cyclemind and Wendell Garcia of Pupil)	Favorite Music Video	Won
2010	"Kasalanan" (with 6cyclemind and Wendell Garcia of Pupil)	Favorite Collaboration	Nominated
2010	"Upuan" (with Jeazelle Grutas of Zelle)	Favorite Urban Video	Won
2010	Himself	Favorite Male Artist	Nominated
2010	Himself	Favorite Myx Live! Performance	Nominated
2010	"Balita" (with Gabby Alipe of Urbandub	Favorite Remake	Nominated
2011	"Martilyo" (with Dex of Letter Day Story	Favorite Collaboration	Nominated
2011	Himself	Favorite Male Artist	Won
2012	"Walang Natira" (with Sheng Belmonte)	Favorite Song	Nominated
2012	"Walang Natira" (with Sheng Belmonte)	Favorite Collaboration	Nominated
2012	"Sari-Saring Kwento" (with Champ Lui Pio and Noel Cabangon)	Favorite Collaboration	Nominated
2012	"One Hit Combo" (with Parokya Ni Edgar)	Favorite Collaboration	Won
2012	"Elmer" (with Jaq Dionesio of Kiss Jane and Jomal Linao of Kamikazee)	Favorite Urban Video	Won
2012	Himself	Favorite Artist	Nominated
2012	Himself	Favorite Male Artist	Won
2013	"Sirena" (with Ebe Dancel)	Favorite Song	Won
2013	"Sirena" (with Ebe Dancel)	Favorite Music Video	Nominated
2013	"Sirena" (with Ebe Dancel)	Favorite Urban Video	Nominated
2013	"Sirena" (with Ebe Dancel)	Favorite Collaboration	Won
2013	Himself	Favorite Artist	Nominated
2013	Himself	Favorite Male Artist	Nominated
2013	Himself	Favorite Myx Live! Performance	Won
2013	"Bakit Hindi" (with Billy Crawford)	Favorite Collaboration	Nominated
2014	"Magda" (with Rico Blanco)	Favorite Music Video	Won
2014	"Magda" (with Rico Blanco)	Favorite Song	Won
2014	"Magda" (with Rico Blanco)	Favorite Urban Video	Won
2014	"Magda" (with Rico Blanco)	Favorite Collaboration	Won
2014	Himself	Favorite Male Artist	Nominated
2014	Himself	Favorite Artist	Nominated
2014	"Ang Parokya" (with Parokya ni Edgar and Frank Magalona)	Favorite Collaboration	Nominated
2015	"Takipsilim" (with Regine Velasquez-Alcasid)	Favorite Music Video	Nominated
2015	"Takipsilim" (with Regine Velasquez-Alcasid)	Favorite Collaboration	Won
2015	Himself	Favorite Artist	Nominated
2015	Himself	Favorite Male Artist	Nominated
2015	"Businessman" (with Vinci Montaner)	Favorite Urban Video	Won
2016	Tandaan Mo 'To (with Erik Santos)	Favorite Collaboration	Nominated
2017	Himself	Favorite Male Artist	Nominated
2017	"Hoy!"	Favorite Urban Video	Won
2017	"Hoy!"	Best Music Video (Special Award)	Won

== Philippine Hip-Hop Awards ==
Year	Nominee / work	Award	Result
2005	Himself	Rap Artist of the Year	Won
2006	Himself	Rap Artist of the Year	Won
2007	Himself	Rap Artist of the Year	Won
2008	Himself	Rap Artist of the Year	Won
2009	Himself	Rap Artist of the Year	Won

== PMPC Star Awards for Music ==
Year	Nominee / work	Award	Result
2011	"Walang Natira"	Song of the Year	Nominated
2011	"Walang Natira"	Music Video of the Year	Won
2011	Talumpati	Album of the Year	Nominated
2011	Talumpati	Rap Album of the Year	Won
2011	Himself	Rap Artist of the Year	Won
2013	MKNM: Mga Kwento Ng Makata	Album of the Year	Won
2013	MKNM: Mga Kwento Ng Makata	Rap Album of the Year	Nominated
2013	Himself	Rap Artist of the Year	Nominated
2013	"Sirena"	Song of the Year	Nominated
2013	"Sirena"	Music Video of the Year	Won
2014	"Magda"	Song of the Year	Nominated
2014	Liham at Lihim	Male Recording Artist of the Year	Nominated
2014	Liham at Lihim	Album of the Year	Won
2014	Liham at Lihim	Rap Album of the Year	Won
2014	"Magda"	Music Video of the Year	Nominated
2014	Himself	Rap Artist of the Year	Won
2015	Biyahe ng Pangarap	Male Rocording Artist of the Year	Won
2019	"Lagi"	Rap Artist of the Year	Nominated

== Tambayan 101.9 OPM Awards ==
Year	Nominee / work	Award	Result
2010	"Upuan"	Song of the Year	Won
2010	Himself	Male Artist of the Year	Nominated

== USTv Students' Choice Awards ==
Year	Nominee / work	Award	Result
2012	"Walang Natira" (with Sheng Belmonte)	Best Local Music Video	Won

== Waki OPM Awards 101.9 ==
Year	Nominee / work	Award	Result
2009	"Sumayaw Ka"	Best Dance Hit	Won

== Wave 891 Urban Music Awards ==
Year	Nominee / work	Award	Result
2014	"Magda" (with Rico Blanco)	Best Original Song	Won
2014	Liham at Lihim	Best Album	Nominated
2014	Himself	Best Rap Artist	Nominated

== Wish 107.5 Music Awards ==
Year	Nominee / work	Award	Result
2016	Himself	Wish Male Artist of the Year	Nominated
2016	"Businessman"	Best Wishclusive Performance by a Male Artist	Nominated
2016	"Businessman"	Wish Urban Song of the Year	Nominated
2016	"Businessman"	Wish Original Song of the Year	Nominated

== Yahoo! Celebrity Awards ==
Year	Nominee / work	Award	Result
2012	Himself	Male Singer of the Year	Nominated
2013	Himself	Male Performer of the year	Nominated
2014	"Magda" (with Rico Blanco)	Song of the year	Nominated
