= 5th PMPC Star Awards for Music =

- Date: October 13, 2013
- Venue: Solaire Resort & Casino, Parañaque
- Hosted by: KC Concepcion; Xian Lim; Erich Gonzales; Billy Crawford

The 5th PMPC Star Awards for Music by the Philippine Movie Press Club (PMPC), honored the best Filipino music of 2012. The ceremony took place on October 13, 2013 at Solaire Resort & Casino in Parañaque.

The PMPC Star Awards for Music was hosted by KC Concepcion, Erich Gonzales, Billy Crawford and Xian Lim. A delayed telecast for the award ceremony was broadcast by ABS-CBN Sunday's Best on October 20, 2013.

== Winners and nominees ==
The following are the nominations for the 5th PMPC Star Awards for Music, covering music released in 2010.

Winners are listed first and indicated in bold.

=== Major categories ===
| Album of the Year | Song of the Year |
|---|---|
| **"MKNM: Mga Kwento ng Makata" – Gloc-9 (Universal Records)**; "All Good" – Nina (Viva Records); "Flower Power" – Callalily – (Universal Records); "Isang Pagkakataon" – Marco Sison (Viva Records); "Panatang Makabanda" – Rivermaya (Universal Records); "Sa Isang Sulyap Mo" – 1:43 (MCA Music); "3D: Tatlong Dekada" – Martin Nievera (PolyEast Records) | **"Sa Isang Sulyap Mo" – 1:43 (MCA Music)**; **Myrus, composer**; "Anong Nangyari sa Ating Dalawa?" – Aiza Seguerra (Star Records); Jovinor Tan, composer; "Ayoko Na" – Marvin Ong (Viva Records); Marvin Ong, composer; "Bakit Ngayon?" – Julie Anne San Jose (GMA Records); Barbara Jeanne Bufete Ponciano, composer; "Nasa 'Yo Na Ang Lahat" – Daniel Padilla (Star Records); Jungee Marcelo, composer; "Pasasalamat" – Callalily (Universal Records); Andrew John Jamnague, composer; "Pusong Lito" – Myrus (Viva Records); Myrus, composer; "Sirena" – Gloc-9 (Universal Records); Gloc-9, composer |
| Male Recording Artist of the Year | Female Recording Artist of the Year |
| **Jed Madela – "All Originals" (Star Records)**; Christian Bautista – "X-Plus" (Universal Records); Gary Valenciano – "Sings Just For You" (Universal Records); Gerald Santos – "The Prince Of Ballad" (Prinstar Music And Big Eyes Production); Marco Sison – "Isang Pagkakataon" (Viva Records); Martin Nievera – "3D: Tatlong Dekada" (PolyEast Records); Ogie Alcasid – "The Songwriter & The Hitmakers" (Universal Records) | **Sarah Geronimo – "Pure" (Viva Records)**; Angeline Quinto – "Fall In Love" (Star Records); Jessa Zaragoza – "Pag Wala ng Ulan" (GMA Records); Juris – "Paskong Puno ng Kasiyahan" (Star Records); Lani Misalucha – "The Love Collection" (Universal Records); Nina – "All Good" (Viva Records); Yeng Constantino – "Metamorphosis" (Star Records) |
| New Male Recording Artist of the Year | New Female Recording Artist of the Year |
| **Daniel Padilla – "Daniel Padilla" (Star Records)**; Clifford Allen Estrala – "If Only In My Dreams)" (Golden Music Arts Records and AVP Records); Khalil Ramos – "Khalil Ramos" (Star Records); Kimpoy Feliciano – "Kimpoy Feliciano" (Universal Records); Paulo Avelino – "Your Love" (Universal Records); Teejay Marquez – "Ako Na Lang" (Goldmine Productions And Bellhaus Recording); Xian Lim – "So It's You" (Star Records) | **Julie Anne San Jose – "Julie Anne San Jose" (GMA Records)**; Alexis – "Arimundingmunding" (Viva Records); Bea Binene – "Bea Binene" (PolyEast Records); Isabelle de Leon – "Love Zone" (PolyEast Records); Liezel Garcia – "Liezel Garcia" (Star Records); Myrtle Sarrosa – "Myrtle Sarrosa" (Star Records); Zendee – "I Believe" (Warner Music Philippines) |
| Duo/Group of the Year | Music Video of the Year |
| **The Company –"Light Hearted OPM" (Viva Records)**; Callalily – "Flower Power" (Universal Records); Moonstar88 – "This Year" (Ivory Music); Parokya ni Edgar – "Inuman Sessions Vol. 2" (Universal Records); Rivermaya – "Panatang Makabanda" (Universal Records); Shamrock – "Legacy" (Viva Records); 1:43 – "Sa Isang Sulyap Mo" (MCA Music) | **"Sirena" – Gloc-9 feat. Ebe Dancel (Universal Records)**; **Jaime Pacena, director**; "Burado" – Rico Blanco (Warner Music Philippines); Pancho Esguerra, director; "Chinito" – Yeng Constantino (Star Records); Avid Liongoren, director; "Daleng-Dale" – MMJ (Vicor Music); Enzo Valdez, director; "Himig ng Pag-Ibig" – Pio Balbuena (Viva Records); Carby Salvador, director; "HKM" – Callalily (Universal Records); Treb Monteras II, director; "It Might Be You" – Gary Valenciano (Universal Records); Enzo Marcos, director; "Pag Wala Na ang Ulan" – Jessa Zaragosa (GMA Records); Raymund Isaac, director |

=== Pop category ===
| Pop Album of the Year | Male Pop Artist of the Year |
|---|---|
| **"DJP" – Daniel Padilla (Star Records)**; "Sa Isang Sulyap Mo" – 1:43 (MCA Music); "Julie Anne San Jose" – Julie Anne San Jose (GMA Records); "Sings Just For You" – Gary Valenciano (Universal Records); "The Love Collections" – Lani Misalucha (Universal Records); "The Songwriter and The Hitmakers" –Ogie Alcasid (Universal Records); "3D: Tatlong Dekada" – Martin Nievera (PolyEast Records) | **Marvin Ong – "Sigaw Ng Puso" (Viva Records)**; Gerald Santos – "Prince Of Ballad" /(Prinstar Music And Big Eyes Production); Jericho Rosales – "Korona" (Star Records); Mark Bautista – "The Sound of Love" (Viva Records); Noel Cabangon – "Tuloy ang Byahe" (Universal Records); Piolo Pascual – "Decades III, Best of OPM" (Star Records); Richard Poon – "Legends" (Universal Records) |
| Female Pop Artist of the Year | |
| **Jessa Zaragoza – "Pag Wala Na Ang Ulan" (GMA Records)**; Angeline Quinto – "Fall in Love" (Star Records); Jennylyn Mercado – "Forever By Your Side" (PolyEast Records); Julie Anne San Jose – "Julie Anne San Jose" (GMA Records); Juris – "Paskong Puno ng Kasiyahan" (Star Records); Nina – "All Good" (Viva Records); Sarah Geronimo – "Pure" (Viva Records) | |

=== Rock, Rap, RnB and Acoustic category ===
| Rock Album of the Year | Rock Artist of the Year |
|---|---|
| **"Metamorphosis" – Yeng Constantino (Star Records)**; "District" – Sponge Cola (Universal Records); "Flower Power" – Callalily (Universal Records); "Galactik Fiestamatik" – Rico Blanco – (Warner Music Philippines); "Inuman Sessions Vol. 2" – Parokya ni Edgar (Universal Records); "Panatang Makabanda" – Rivermaya (Universal Records); "Legacy" – Shamrock (Viva Records) | **Rico Blanco – "Galactik Fiestamatik" (Warner Music Philippines)**; Callalily – "Flower Power (Universal Records); Jovit Baldivino – "OPM's Great" (Star Records); Parokya ni Edgar – "Inuman Sessions Vol. 2" (Universal Records); Rivermaya – "Panatang Makabanda" (Universal Records); Shamrock – "Legacy" (Viva Records); Sponge Cola – "District" (Universal Records) |
| Rap Album of the Year | Rap Artist of the Year |
| **"Metal Dog" – John Rendez (PolyEast Records)**; "Dukha" – Pio Balbuena (Viva Records); "Doin' It Big" – Young JV (Star Records); "MKNM: Mga Kwento ng Makata" – Gloc-9 (Universal Records); "Sana'y Mapansin" – Blanktape (GMA Records) | **John Rendez –"Metal Dog" (PolyEast Records)**; Blanktape – "Sana'y Mapansin" (GMA Records); Gloc-9 – "MKNM: Mga Kwento ng Makata" (Universal Records); Kenjohns – "Matinik" (Viva Records); Pio Balbuena – "Dukha" (Viva Records); Young JV – "Doin' It Big" (Star Records) |
| Acoustic Album of the Year | Male Acoustic Artist of the Year |
| **"Tuloy Pa Rin" – Nyoy Volante (MCA Music)**; "Acoustic Princess II" – Princess Velasco (Vicor Music); "Angela Sings Queen" – Angela (PolyEast Records); "I Love Acoustic 5" – Sabrina (MCA Music); "The Dans" – Stephanie & Kim (PolyEast Records); "Tuloy Ang Byahe" - Noel Cabangon (Universal Records) | **Noel Cabangon – "Tuloy Ang Byahe" (Universal Records)**; Nyoy Volante – "Tuloy Pa Rin" (MCA Music) |
| Female Acoustic Artist of the Year | RnB Artist of the Year |
| **Princess Velasco – "Acoustic Princess II" (Vicor Music)**; Angela – "Angela Sings Queen" (PolyEast Records); Juris – "Paskong Puno ng Kasiyahan" (Star Records); Sabrina – "I Love Acoustic 5" (MCA Music); Stephanie & Kim – "The Dans" (PolyEast Records) | **Luke Mejares – "Kasayaw" (Ivory Music)**; Jason Hernandez – "Bukod Tangi" (Viva Records); Liezel Garcia – Liezel Garcia (Star Records) |

=== Novelty category ===
| Novelty Album of the Year | Novelty Song of the Year |
|---|---|
| **"Dekada" – Masculados (Universal Records)**; "Arimundingmunding" – Alexis (Universal Records); "Boy Pick Up" – Ogie Alcasid (Universal Records); "May Tama" – Blakdyak (Viva Records) | **"Arimunding-Munding" – Alexis (Viva Records)**; **Christian Martinez (composer); and**; **"Pinoy na Krismas" – The Company (Signature Music Inc.)**; **Ogie Alcasid and Jose Mari Chan, composers (tied)**; "Hawakan Mo Na" – Masculados (Universal Records); RJ Jimenez, composer; "Hayahay" – Blanktape (GMA Records); Blanktape, composer; "Kahit Na" – Toni Gonzaga (Star Records); Jumbo de Belen, composer; "Kesa" – Daniel Grospe (Ivory Music); Edwin Marollano, composer; "Song of the Firefly" – Jose Mari Chan (Signature Music Inc.); Jose Mari Chan, composer |
| Novelty Artist of the Year | |
**Alexis – "Arimunding-Munding" (Viva Records)**; Blakdyak – "May Tama" (Viva Records); Masculados – "Dekada" (Universal Records)

=== Album category ===
| Alternative Album of the Year | Revival Album of the Year |
|---|---|
| **"This Year" – Moonstar88 (Ivory Music)**; "Different Corners" – General Luna (Warner Music Philippines); "She's Only Sixteen" – SOS (Universal Records) | **"The Prince Of Ballad" – Gerald Santos (Prinstar Music and Big Eyes Production)**; "Decades III, Best of OPM" – Piolo Pascual (Star Records); "Sings Just For You" – Gary Valenciano (Universal Records); "Lighthearted OPM" – The Company (Viva Records); *Legends" – Richard Poon (Universal Records); "The Songwriter and The Hitmakers" – Ogie Alcasid (Universal Records); "Tuloy Pa Rin" – Nyoy Volante (MCA Music) |
| Compilation Album of the Year | Dance Album of the Year |
| **"Himig Handog: P-Pop Love Songs" – Various artists (Star Records)**; "Hanggang Sa Dulo ng Walang Hanggan" – Various artists (Viva Records); "Ina Kapatid Anak" – Various artists (Star Records); "Tunog Natin: Songs From Home" – Various artists (MCA Music); "Philippine Popular Music Festival 2012" – Various artists (Ivory Music); "The X-Factor Philippines" – Various artists (Star Records) | **"Best Of The Teen Pop Idol" – Eurika (Aika Records)**; "Chicser" – Chicser (Viva Records); "Daleng-Dale" – MMJ (Vicor Records); "Dekada" – Masculados (Universal Records); "Doin' It Big" – Young JV (Star Records); "Kasayaw" – Luke Mejares (Ivory Music); "Matinik" – Kenjohns (Viva Records) |
| Inspirational Album of the Year | Album Cover Design of the Year |
| **"ASOP: A Song of Praise" – ASOP (BMPI Inc.)**; "Where's The Sheep?" – Wher's the Sheep (Viva Records) | **3D: Tatlong Dekada – Martin Nievera (PolyEast Records)** |

=== Concert category ===
| Concert of the Year | Male Concert Performer of the Year |
|---|---|
| **"Foursome" – Martin Nievera, Ogie Alcasid, Pops Fernandez, and Regine Velasquez (Star Media, iMusic, DSL Productions and GMA Network)**; "Daniel Live!" – Daniel Padilla (ABS-CBN); "Jose and Wally: A Party for Every Juan" – Jose Manalo and Wally Bayola (APT Entertainment); "Silver – Regine Velasquez (iMusic and GMA Network); "X Class: The Xtian Bautista Year 10 Concert" – Christian Bautista (Stages Talent Management); "3-25: Tatlong Beinte Singko" – Dingdong Avanzado (Viva Concert); "24/SG" – Sarah Geronimo (Viva Concerts) | **Martin Nievera – "Foursome" (Star Media, iMusic, DSL Productions and GMA Network)**; Christian Bautista –"X-Class: The Xtian Bautista Year 10 Concert" (Stages Talent Management); Daniel Padilla –"Daniel Live!" (ABS-CBN); Dingdong Avanzado – "3-25 Tatlong Beinte Singko" (Viva Concert); Gerald Santos – "Prince of Ballad"; Jose Manalo and Wally Bayola – "Jose and Wally: A Party for Every Juan" (APT Entertainment); Ogie Alcasid (Foursome) "Foursome" (Star Media, iMusic, DSL Productions and GMA Network) |
| Female Concert Performer of the Year | |
| **Regine Velasquez – "Foursome" (Star Media, iMusic, DSL Productions and GMA Network)**; Regine Velasquez – "Silver"; Pops Fernandez – "Foursome" (Star Media, iMusic, DSL Productions and GMA Network); Sarah Geronimo – "24/SG" (Viva Concerts) | |

Note: There were no entries for RnB Album/RnB Artist, Rap Album/Rap Artist of the Year and NO Alternative Album of the Year.

=== Special awards ===
- Lifetime Achievement Awards: Freddie Aguilar
- Special Citation: Jose Mari Chan
- **Icons of Original Pilipino Music (OPM)**
  - Dulce
  - Imelda Papin
  - Rey Valera
  - Rico J. Puno
  - Sampaguita
  - Vic Sotto
