= Biyahe ng Pangarap =

Live album and Video by Gloc-9
- Released: November 9, 2014
- Recorded: September 1, 2014
- Genres: Pinoy hip hop, Hip hop, OPM
- Label: Universal Records
- Producer: Kathleen Dy-Go

Gloc-9 non-studio album chronology
Biyahe ng Pangarap (2014)	Sukli (2016)

Biyahe ng Pangarap (lit. 'Journey of [the] Dream') is the first live album and DVD of Filipino rapper Gloc-9, originally released on November 9, 2014. The album featured songs from his previous albums MKNM: Mga Kwento Ng Makata (6 tracks), Liham at Lihim (5 tracks) and Talumpati (1 track). Also, the album has one bonus track (studio recorded) entitled Businessman with former Parokya Ni Edgar vocalist Vinci Montaner arranged by Jazz Nicholas of Itchyworms which also serves as the album's first single.

== Track listing ==
No.	Title	Length
1.	"Intro"	1:46
2.	"Apatnapung Bara (Forty Bars)"	2:36
3.	"Tsinelas Sa Putikan (Slippers in Mud)" (featuring Marc Abaya of Kjwan)	5:02
4.	"Pison (Steamroller)" (featuring Chito Miranda)	3:41
5.	"Lando" (featuring Chito Miranda)	4:38
6.	"Huminahon Ka (Calm Down)" (featuring Sly Kane & Lirah Bermudez)	3:30
7.	"Hari ng Tondo (King of Tondo)" (featuring Denise Barbacena)	4:20
8.	"Sirena (Mermaid)" (featuring Ebe Dancel)	4:52
9.	"Magda" (featuring Rico Blanco)	5:29
10.	"Hindi Sapat (Not Enough)" (featuring Cooky Chua and Ryan Cayabyab)	4:07
11.	"Thankful" (featuring Maychelle Baay)	6:16
12.	"Alalay Ng Hari (King's Assistant)" (featuring Johnoy Danao)	4:02
13.	"Takipsilim (Twilight)" (featuring Tippy Dos Santos)	4:15

Bonus Track
No.	Title	Length
14.	"Businessman" (featuring Vinci Montaner)	3:36
