= Matrikula =

Studio album by Gloc-9
- Released: September 13, 2009
- Genre: Pinoy hip hop
- Labels: Musiko Records & Sony Music Philippines Inc.
- Producer: Rudy Y. Tee

Gloc-9 chronology
Diploma (2007)	Matrikula (2009)	Talumpati (2011)

Matrikula (lit. 'Tuition Fee') is a 2009 album and his 4th album by Filipino rapper Gloc-9. It has 16 tracks and was released under Musiko Records & Sony Music Philippines.

== Track listing ==
All tracks are written by Gloc9.

No.	Title	Length
1.	"Intro ni Mike Swift (Mr. Swift's Introduction)"	1:51
2.	"Lipat Mo (track filler)"	0:05
3.	"Martilyo (Hammer)" (featuring Letter Day Story)
4.	"Papel (Paper)"
5.	"Tinta (Ink)"
6.	"Balita (News)" (featuring Gabby Alipe of Urbandub)
7.	"Upuan (Chair/Seat)" (featuring Jeazell Grutas of Zelle)
8.	"Bituin (Star)" (featuring Allan Mitchel)
9.	"Biyahe ni Syke (Syke's Journey)" ((Interlude))
10.	"Bayad Ko (My Fare)" (featuring Noel Cabangon)
11.	"Bahala Na (Come what may)" (featuring Moymoy Palaboy, Sisa of Crazy As Pinoy and Biboy of Queso)
12.	"The Bobo Song (The Dumb Song)" (featuring Loonie of Stickfiggas)
13.	"Pasakalye ng Pangarap (Introduction of Ambition)"
14.	"Pangarap (Ambition)" (featuring Raimund Marasigan)
15.	"Kaibigan Ko (My Friend)" (featuring The Hardware Syndrome with Itoy and Willie of the Spindicate Posse)
16.	"Tao (Man)" (featuring feat. Cookie Chua of Color It Red)

== Singles ==
=== Upuan ===
Upuan is the first single of Gloc-9 off the album. The song features Jeazel Grutas of the band Zelle.

=== Balita ===
Balita is the second single of Gloc-9. It features Gabby Alipe of Urbandub.

=== Martilyo ===
Martilyo is the third single of Gloc-9 of the album.

== Album credits ==
- Executive producer: Rudy Y. Tee
- A&R Executive: Vic Valenciano
- Marketing directors: Narciso Chan, Mario Joson
- Photography and art direction: J. Pacena II
- Assistant photographer: Mary Ann Sy
- Stylists: David Baky Jr.(for Thea, Shaun and Daniel Pollisco's wardrobe for Matrikula Album and Jeazell Grutas and Gloc-9's wardrobe for Upuan music video), Kel Sampayan (for Matrkula Album Cover and Gloc-9's Matrikula wardrobe)
- Make-up artist: Em Rejano
