= Diploma (album) =

Studio album by Gloc-9
- Released: May 20, 2007
- Genre: Pinoy hip hop
- Label: Musiko Records & Sony BMG Music Entertainment (Philippines), Inc.
- Producer: Gloc-9

Gloc-9 chronology
| Ako Si… (2005) | Diploma (2007) | Matrikula (2009) |

Diploma is the third studio album by Filipino rapper Gloc-9. It has 14 tracks and was released under Musiko Records & Sony BMG Music Entertainment (Philippines), Inc. in 2007.

== Track listing ==
All tracks produced by Gloc-9.

| No. | Title | Writer(s) | Length |
|---|---|---|---|
| 1. | "Diploma" | Aristotle Pollisco | 4:24 |
| 2. | "Lando (feat. Francis M.)" | Pollisco; Alfonso Miranda Jr. | 5:11 |
| 3. | "The Task Is Done (featuring Gobas & Reg Rubio of Greyhoundz)" | Pollisco; Arvin Bernat | 4:53 |
| 4. | "Sumayaw Ka" | Pollisco | 3:42 |
| 5. | "B.I." | Pollisco; Cornell Haynes; Jason Lee Epperson | 3:55 |
| 6. | "Lov na Lov (featuring Lovi Poe)" | Pollisco | 3:59 |
| 7. | "Blues Niyang Itim (featuring Czarina Rosales)" | Pollisco | 3:54 |
| 8. | "Demo Tape (Interlude)" | Pollisco | 1:49 |
| 9. | "Sila (featuring Loonie of Stick Figgas & Konflick of Death Threat)" | Pollisco; Marlon Peroramas; Rome Pagkanlungan | 4:45 |
| 10. | "Lapis at Papel" | Pollisco | 3:10 |
| 11. | "Torpedo (featuring JP Cuison of Kiko Machine)" | Pollisco; Ely Buendia | 4:20 |
| 12. | "Kayo (featuring Mitchell)" | Pollisco | 3:34 |

Bonus tracks

| No. | Title | Writer(s) | Length |
|---|---|---|---|
| 1. | "Lando (featuring Chito Miranda)" | Pollisco; Miranda | 5:08 |
| 2. | "Lando [Radio Edit]" | Pollisco; Miranda | 3:25 |

Sample credits:

- "B.I" heavily samples and uses the melody of "E.I." performed by Nelly and written by Cornell Haynes and Jason Lee Epperson.
- "Torpedo" is a remixed version of the original song of the same name by Eraserheads, from their 1995 album Cutterpillow.
