= Ian Tayao =

- Born: Ian Irving Vega Tayao; May 10, 1978 (age 48)
- Origin: Manila, Philippines
- Genres: Experimental rock, alternative metal, nu metal, funk metal, reggae rock
- Occupations: Musician, vlogger, skateboarder, producer
- Instruments: Vocals, guitar, percussion
- Years active: 1994–present
- Labels: Warner Music Philippines (Cheese), EMI Music (Queso), Independent (Binabaliw, Armalite)

Ian Irving Vega Tayao (born May 10, 1978) is a Filipino musician, producer, vlogger and skateboarder, known for fronting the bands Queso (formerly Cheese), Wilabaliw, and Armalite.

Hailed as one of the Philippines' "Three Kings of Slam" (along with Greyhoundz's Reg Rubio and Slapshock's Jamir Garcia), he is well known for his aggressive yet experimental musicianship.

== Music career ==
=== Cheese (1994 to present) ===
1994, Queso started out using the name Cheese. The original members were Enzo Ruidera, 2TS Calinawan and Pao Rosal. Tayo, cousin of Power Rosario, CJ Olaguera, 8 Toleran and RT de Ano joined later. In 1997, the band released a two-song demo, the songs "Fine" and "The Way" were in it. Five thousand copies was sold out in a week. "Fine" eventually garnered airplay on NU107 and eventually hit the charts. The band was signed by Warner Music Philippines. In 1998, the self-titled debut album Cheese was released. The singles "10x Karma" and "Fine" climbed the charts and the band was nominated in a number of categories at the 1999 NU107 Rock Awards. Maly Andres, the producer of the album, won Producer of the Year award for his work it. The album won an Awit Award for Rom Villaseran's work on the album cover layout.

The band toured the album, and went to Korea to represent the Philippines in the 2000 Pusan Rock Festival. The band went on to write new materials. Biboy Garcia who went on to record with the band on their sophomore effort replaced RT de Ano. 2001 saw the release of Cheese's second album, Pilipinas. The album was named "the richest rock release of that year". The album went on to win Vocalist of the Year, People's Choice Award and Album of the Year in the 2002 NU107 Rock awards.

In 2003, Queso officially announced that they were changing their name to Queso from Cheese. The same year drummer Pow Rosal was replaced by drummer Robert dela Cruz. Robert came in to continue touring the album all throughout the country. In 2004, the band went back to the studio to write new materials. In 2005, Queso released Buhay Queso, a DVD documentary about the band, members and their adventures. A year after, 2006, the band finished recording and releases their self-titled effort Queso.

The band (along with Slapshock and Greyhoundz) headed the country's annual music festival PULP Summer Slam.

The band broke up after their third album but reunited in 2012.

=== Wilabaliw (2010 to present) ===
Tayao conceptualized the project 8 years ago, back when he was still active with Queso. The perfect chance to manifest the idea did not become so vivid until he was able to cosmically find members or better yet the members finding him.

Consisting musicians from their respective bands: Tayao himself, Robert dela Cruz (his bandmate in Queso, also plays for Skychurch), Francis Magat (from Salindiwa) and Louis Isok (of Enemies of Saturn). The band played heavier stuff compared to their groups.

The debut album 10.10.10. was independently-released in 2010 (believed as one of the reasons for the album's title), unleashing tracks like the groovy "Me Techie Love You Long Time", hard-hitting "Diveler" and the hit single "Illuminate I". In 2012, they released their song "Samadi" through Tower of Doom's Tower Sessions program on YouTube .

At the end of 2013, the band's line-up changed as Magat and Dela Cruz were replaced by Nino Avenido (of Greyhoundz) and Jesso Ron "Pornstar" Montejo (of 4th Draztik). In the following year, the band released their song "Fahira", followed by "Not So Fast" not long after, which they turned up to the Wilabaliw TeeDee ( a combination of CD and T-Shirt) through Built by Sonic.

After two years, the band released new songs, called "Jack Stone", "Sunken ID" and "Hindi Na Makita" (also claimed as the band's first Tagalog song) in 2017. Before the year 2017 ended, line-up changed for the bassist as Nino Avenido was replaced by Keith Francisco (of Arcadia).

=== Armalite (2014 to present) ===
The quintet was formed in 2014, consists of Queso buddies Tayao, Ocho Toleran, Biboy Garcia with Martin Hocson and Michael Gemina, spawned songs such as "Smoke Screen" and "Halo Jump", which later turned into a CD, which was launched on December 17, 2014, at 19 East Parañaque.

Later, Gemina was replaced by Allan "Bords" Burdeos of Kamikazee, as stated in the band's Facebook page on October 20, 2016.

== Solo projects ==
Outside his bands, Tayao is still making music in his own movement. Collaborated with his musician friends such as Randy Pages, Wendell Garcia, and Louie Talan, in covering a song of another band Brain Salad titled "Bulong (Mo Sa Dilim)". He also formed an acoustic project called BatCat, together with Nino Avenido and Zach Lucero of Imago. He also collaborated with progressive/power metal group Plethora, with Greyhoundz' Audz Avenido on the song "Triangulo".

Tayao also recorded his own songs such as "Dandy", "Mauricio", "The Dragon That Never Sleeps" and "Pull The Plug".

Tayao collaborated on the song "Apatnapungbara" for Gloc 9's album MKNM: Mga Kwento Ng Makata in 2012, and later collaborated for the song "Tarantatula" from Binabaliw's recently released Aurum in 2019. He was also featured with Nicole Asensio on the love song "All in All", from Asensio's debut album Schizoprano in 2015.

In 2017, Tayao collaborated with metal band Vie for the song "Ganid".

In February 2018, Tayao collaborated with female-fronted band Saydie on their latest single "Yokai".

== Musical styles ==
Musicians and listeners can't exactly define Tayao's musical sensibilities and styles. In Queso, he is regarded as part of the Filipino nu-metal scene. But since his voice is a fusion of reggae, funk, hard alternative and heavy metal, even playing with Wilabaliw and Armalite, his voice is the signature of his musicianship: familiar yet different, as FHM Philippines stated.

== Other pursuits ==
Tayao is an affiliate of Ragdoll Development, a group of artists, videographers, and companies who support Filipino skaters. He also created a Facebook show called "Timon and Pumba Live", along with Ramon Mager (of Sickpig).

In 2011, Tayao also starred in a short film entry for International Academy of Film and Television (IAFT) by Karl Porio, titled "The Gap" as the lead role of Danny.

== Discography ==
=== With Cheese/Queso ===
- Cheese (Warner Music Philippines, 1998)
- Pilipinas (Warner Music Philippines, 2002)
- Queso (EMI Music, 2006)

=== With Wilabaliw ===
- 10.10.10 (2010)
- Aurum (2019)

=== With Armalite ===
- Armalite- Built to Kill (2014)
