= Death threat (disambiguation) =

Death threat is a threat by one person or a group of people to kill another person or group of people.

Death threat may also refer to:

- Death Threat (hip hop group), a hip hop group
- Death Threat (film), a 1980 crime drama film
- "Death Threat", an episode of Night Court
- Death Threat, a 90s Connecticut hardcore punk band
