= 26th Awit Awards =

2013 Philippine music awards ceremony

- Date: December 11, 2013
- Location: Sequoia Hotel, South Triangle, Quezon City

Highlights
- Most awards: Gloc-9; Angeline Quinto (3)
- Most nominations: Alwyn Cruz (8)
- Album of the Year: MKNM: Mga Kwento Ng Makata by Gloc-9
- Song of the Year: "Sirena" by Gloc-9

The 26th Awit Awards were held in Sequoia Hotel, Quezon City. They honored the best of Filipino music for the year 2012. The Philippine Association of the Record Industry decided to hold a small event, where only the winners were invited, due to the tragic Typhoon Yolanda (Haiyan) that affected the country last month. The money to be used for the planned extravagant awards ceremony was instead donated to the calamity fund. Being a simple ceremony, no performances occurred.

Nominees were announced on June 3, 2013. Alwyn Cruz led the pack with eight nominations. He was followed by Jonathan Manalo with seven. Gloc-9 and Vic Valenciano came next receiving six nods.

Gloc-9 and Angeline Quinto won most of the awards with three. For the third consecutive time, Ronnie Ricketts was given a certificate of appreciation again for his campaign against piracy.

== Winners and nominees ==
Winners are listed first and highlighted in bold. Nominated producers, composers and lyricists are not included in this list, unless noted. For the full list, please go to their official website.

=== Performance Awards ===
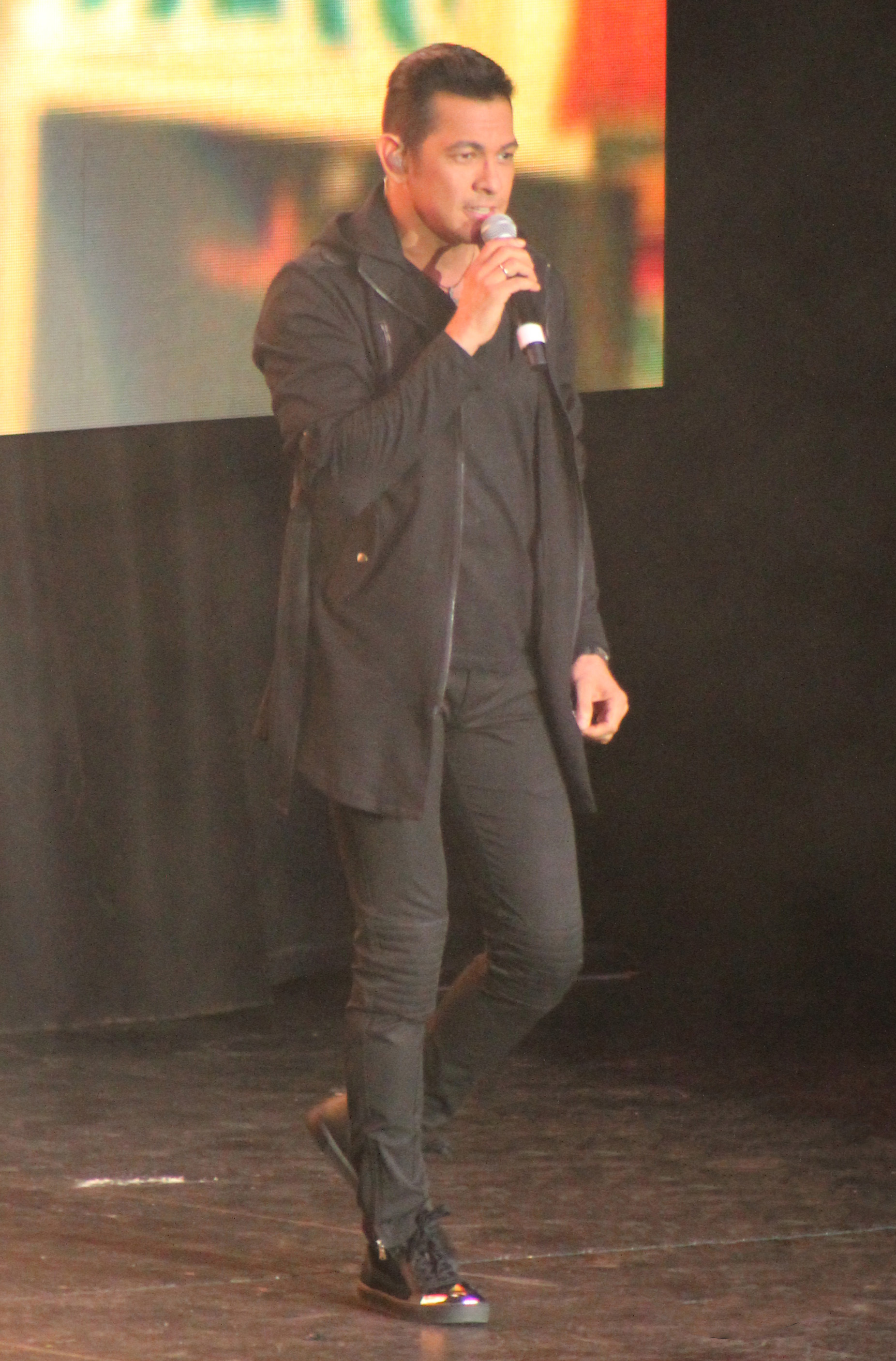
Gary Valenciano, Best Male winner

Best Performance by a Female Recording Artist	Best Performance by a Male Recording Artist
**"With a Smile" – Aiza Seguerra**; "Tao" – Sarah Geronimo; "Saan Darating ang Umaga" – Angeline Quinto; "On My Own" – Lea Salonga; "I’ll Be There" – Julie Anne San Jose	**"Hanggang sa Dulo ng Walang Hanggan" – Gary Valenciano**; "Piso" – Joey Ayala; "Tuwing Umuulan at Kapiling Ka" – Noel Cabangon; "Kontrabida" – Sam Concepcion; "Ipadarama" – Martin Nievera; "In Your Eyes" – Gary Valenciano
Best Performance by a Group Recording Artists	Best Performance by a New Female Recording Artist
**"12:51" – Krissy & Ericka**; "Minsan" – Callalily; "Pick Your Poison" – Sponge Cola; "Love You Like a Love Song" – Stephanie & Kim; "Buksan" – Where's The Sheep?	**"That Time of Year" – Sheila Valderrama**; "Ayaw na Kung Ayaw" – Cathy Go; "Inseparable" – K-La; "I’ll Be There" – Julie Anne San Jose; "Wag Ka Nang Umiyak" – KZ Tandingan
Best Performance by a New Male Recording Artist	Best Performance by a New Group Recording Artists
**"Kesa" – Daniel Grospe**; "Maria" – Jason Fernandez; "Biglang Liko" – Ron Henley; "Grow Old with You" – Daniel Padilla; "Kung Ako Ba Siya" – Khalil Ramos	**"Bigtime" – Baihana**; "Got to Be Real" – AKA Jam; "Alive" – Never the Strangers; "Dying to Meet You!" – She's Only Sixteen; "KPL" – The Oktaves
Best Collaboration
**"With a Little Help from My Friends" – Tria Bascon feat. The Company**; "Sirena" – Gloc-9 feat. Ebe Dancel; "Himig ng Panahon" – Duncan Ramos, Luke Mejares, Loonie, Thyro & Yumi; "Lipad ng Pangarap" – Angeline Quinto feat. Regine Velasquez; "XGF" – Sponge Cola feat. Chito Miranda & Los Magno

=== Creativity Awards ===
Album of the Year	Song of the Year
**MKNM: Mga Kwento Ng Makata – Gloc-9**; Tuloy ang Byahe – Noel Cabangon; Pure OPM Classics – Sarah Geronimo; Find My Way to You – Cathy Go; Julie Anne San Jose – Julie Anne San Jose	**"Sirena"** **Aristotle Pollisco (composer & lyricist)**; "12:51" Krissy Villongco (composer & lyricist); "Ayaw na Kung Ayaw" Mike Villegas (composer & lyricist); "Magkikita pa Rin Naman Tayo" Moy Ortiz (composer & lyricist); "Paboritong Tag-ulan" Jonathan Manalo (composer) Jericho Rosales (lyricist)
Best Selling Album of the Year	Best Ballad Recording
**Daniel Padilla – Daniel Padilla**	**"Hanggang sa Dulo ng Walang Hanggan" – Gary Valenciano**; "Tuwing Umuulan at Kapiling Ka" – Noel Cabangon; "Tao" – Sarah Geronimo; "12:51" – Krissy & Ericka; "I’ll Be There" – Julie Anne San Jose
Best Rock/Alternative Recording	Best World Music Recording
**"Better Days" – Franco**; "Tayo-tayo Lang" – Ebe Dancel; "Maria" – Jason Fernandez; "Halik" – Kamikazee; "KPL" – The Oktaves	**"Pinoy na Krismas" – The Company**; "Muli" – RJ Jacinto feat. Sitti
Best Novelty Recording	Best Dance Recording
**"Kesa" – Daniel Grospe**; "Pusong Bato" – Alon; "Kape Ka Ba?" – Boy Pick-Up; "Mahal Kita Kasi" – Kedebon Colim; "Brown" – Brownman Revival & James Leyte	**"Matinik" – Kenjhons**; "Sayaw" – Rico Blanco; "Pinoy Ako 2012" – Toni Gonzaga; "Kasayaw" – Luke Mejares; "Your Name" – Young JV
Best Inspirational/Religious Recording	Best Christmas Recording
**"Lipad ng Pangarap" – Angeline Quinto feat. Regine Velasquez**; "Bawat Hakbang" – Mark Bautista & The Akafellas; "Wag Ka Nang Umiyak" – KZ Tandingan; "Liliwanag" – Acel van Ommen; "Buksan" – Where's The Sheep?	**"Christmas Moments" – Jose Mari Chan feat. Michael Philip Chan,** **Jose Antonio Chan, Liza Chan-Parpan & Franco Chan**; "Kumukutikutitap" – Rachelle Ann Go; "Paskong Puno ng Kasiyahan" – Juris; "This Christmas" – The Morning Episodes; "Pasko na Sinta Ko" – Basil Valdez
Best Rap Recording	Best Jazz Recording
**"Tao Lang" – Loonie feat. Quest**; "Sirena" – Gloc-9 feat. Ebe Dancel; "Biglang Liko" – Ron Henley feat. Pow Chavez; "Bagsakan" – Parokya ni Edgar feat. Gloc-9 & Frank Magalona; "Rock This Town" – Young JV feat. Laze & Yumi	**"Bigtime" – Baihana**
Best R&B Recording	Best Regional Recording
**"Enough" – Julie Anne San Jose**; "Dota o Ako" – Aikee feat. Sabrina; "Dance with Me" – Liezel Garcia; "Himig ng Panahon" – Duncan Ramos, Luke Mejares, Loonie, Thyro & Yumi	**"Usahay" (in Cebuano) – Noel Cabangon**; "Basi pa Lang" (in Hiligaynon) – 3BU
Best Song Written for Movie/TV/Stage Play
**"Nag-iisang Bituin" (from Princess and I) – Angeline Quinto**; "Growing Up" (from Growing Up) – Yeng Constantino; "Dahil Sa 'Yo" (from E-Boy) – Juris

=== Technical Achievement Awards ===
Best Musical Arrangement	Best Vocal Arrangement
**"With a Little Help from My Friends" – JD Villanueva**; "Makita Kang Muli" – Jimmy Antiporda; "Send in the Clowns" – Homer Flores; "Piso" – Krist Melecio; "Tonight" – Bobby Velasco	**"With a Little Help from My Friends" – Moy Ortiz**; "Got to Be Real" – Cezar Aguas & Jimmy Antiporda; "December 25" – Robert Delgado; "Overjoyed" – Mon Faustino; "Bawat Hakbang" – Karl Villuga
Best Engineered Recording	Best Album Package
**"Send in the Clowns" – Willy Villa**; "Amats" – Rico Blanco; "I'm Old Fashioned" – Dominic Benedicto; "Alipin Ako" – Dante Taňedo; "Roll the Dice" – Pat Tirano	**First Class: Outbound Expanded Edition** **Idee Kreativ (graphic design)** **Kathleen Dy-Go (album concept)** **Pat Dy & Jay Javier (photography)**; **This Year** **JP Cuison & Robert Perez (graphic design & album concept)** **Carina Altomonte (photography)**; 3D Tatlong Dekada Willie Monzon (graphic design & album concept) Raymund Isaac (photography); Decades III Andrew Castillo (graphic design & album concept) Raymund Isaac (photography); Doin' It Big Andrew Castillo (graphic design & album concept) Xander Angeles (photography)
Music Video of the Year
**"Sirena" – Gloc-9 feat. Ebe Dancel** **J. Pacena II (director)**; "La Belle Vie" – Tria Bascon Chuck Gutierrez & Voyage Studios (directors); "Amats" – Rico Blanco Maria Ancheta (director); "Halik" – Kamikazee Avid Liongoren (director); "Ligaw" – Moonstar88 Mark Lenard Mendoza (director)

=== Digital Awards ===
EGG's AllHits.ph Most Downloaded Song for 2012	EGG's AllHits.ph Most Downloaded Artist for 2012
**"Akala" – Chito Miranda**^{[A]}	**Where's The Sheep?**
I-Gateway Mobile Philippines Inc.'s Most Downloaded Song for 2012	I-Gateway Mobile Philippines Inc.'s Most Downloaded Artist for 2012
**"Ligaw" – Herbert Hernandez**^{[A]}	**Angeline Quinto**
MyMusicStore's Most Downloaded Song for 2012	MyMusicStore's Most Downloaded Artist for 2012
**"XGF" – Yael Yuzon & Los Magno**^{[A]}	**Sponge Cola**

Note:

^[A]The awards were given specifically to the composers, instead of the recording artists/groups.

=== Special Award ===
Certificate of Appreciation
- **Ronnie Ricketts**
