= Liham at Lihim =

Studio album by Gloc-9
- Released: October 26, 2013
- Recorded: 2013 (Sonic State Recording Audio Studio; Studio Z Audio Productions & Recording Studios; Tower of Doom Studios)
- Genre: Pinoy hip hop
- Label: Universal
- Producers: Kathleen Dy-Go (executive), Jonathan Arnold Ong, Eric Perlas

Gloc-9 chronology
MKNM: Mga Kwento Ng Makata (2012)	Liham at Lihim (2013)	Sukli (2016)

Liham at Lihim (lit. 'Letter and Secret') is the seventh album by the Filipino rapper Gloc-9. In an interview by Myx, Gloc-9 stated that he had a dream collaboration with a certain artist that happened on this album (though he did not reveal the name of that artist). The album has tracks featuring Regine Velasquez-Alcasid, Rico Blanco, Quest, Marc Abaya of Kjwan, Zia Quizon, Kamikazee, Eunice Jorge of Gracenote, Denise Barbacena and Sly Kane. The album is released in October 2013 with the song "Magda" featuring Rico Blanco as its first single. It has 12 tracks under the Universal label.

== Track listing ==
No.	Title	Length
1.	"Huminahon Ka (Calm Down)" (featuring Sly Kane)	3:30
2.	"Takip Silim (Twilight)" (featuring Regine Velasquez-Alcasid)	4:00
3.	"KMT" (featuring Eunice Jorge of Gracenote)	3:53
4.	"Magda" (featuring Rico Blanco)	5:20
5.	"Rap Ka Nga (You Rap)"	3:05
6.	"Kwento Mo (Your Story)" (featuring Glocnine)	3:09
7.	"Tsinelas Sa Putikan (Slippers in Mud)" (featuring Marc Abaya of Kjwan)	4:51
8.	"Siga" (featuring Quest)	4:52
9.	"Hindi Sapat (Not Enough)" (featuring Denise Barbacena)	4:02
10.	"Katulad Ng Iba (Like the Others)" (featuring Zia Quizon)	2:58
11.	"Kunwari (Sham)" (featuring Kamikazee, Biboy Garcia of Queso and Manuel Legarda of Wolfgang)	4:30
12.	"Itak ni Andres (Bolo of Andres)"	3:12

"Magda"
41-second sample from the song "Magda" from the album Liham at Lihim (2013).

== Certifications ==
Country	Provider	Certification	Sales
Philippines	PARI	Platinum	15,000+
