= Wag Ka Nang Umiyak =

2007 song by Sugarfree

Single by Sugarfree

from the album Tala-Arawan
- Language: Tagalog
- Released: 2007
- Genre: Pop rock
- Length: 5:35
- Label: EMI Philippines
- Songwriter: Ebe Dancel

Music video
- "Wag Ka Nang Umiyak" on YouTube

"Wag Ka Nang Umiyak" (Note: The name is written without an apostrophe before "Wag", a contraction of the word "Huwag".) (transl. "Don't Cry Anymore") is a song originally recorded by Filipino pop rock band Sugarfree for the band's third studio album Tala-Arawan. It was written by Ebe Dancel, and released in 2007 through EMI Philippines (now known as PolyEast Records).

== Background ==
The song was written by the band's lead vocalist Ebe Dancel. According to Dancel, the song was inspired of someone he knew who easily cries whenever seeing something sad. The song was written in 10 minutes, the fastest song ever written by him.

== KZ Tandingan version ==
"Wag Ka Nang Umiyak"

Single by KZ Tandingan
- Released: 2014
- Length: 4:40
- Label: ABS-CBN Film Productions, Inc.
- Songwriter: Ebe Dancel

In 2014, a version of the song by KZ Tandingan become a theme song of the movie The Trial. The song was released by ABS-CBN Film Productions, Inc. KZ Tandingan received two nominations at the 26th Awit Awards for her performance of the song.

Award	Year (Note: Indicates the year of ceremony. Each year is linked to the article about the awards held that year, wherever possible.)	Recipient(s) and nominee(s)	Category	Result	Ref.
Awit Award	2013	Wag Ka Nang Umiyak	Best Performance by a New Female Recording Artist	Nominated	
Awit Award	2013	Wag Ka Nang Umiyak	Best Performance by a New Female Recording Artist	Nominated	

== Gary Valenciano version ==
"Wag Ka Nang Umiyak"

Single by Gary Valenciano

from the album FPJ's Ang Probinsyano: The Official Soundtrack
- Released: September 29, 2015
- Genre: Pop, Ballad
- Length: 5:11
- Label: ABS-CBN Film Productions, Inc.
- Songwriter: Ebe Dancel

One year after the released of the version of KZ Tandingan, ABS-CBN Film Productions, Inc. once again released a new version this time by Gary Valenciano. The version of Valenciano has been included in the soundtrack of FPJ's Ang Probinsyano.

This version by Valenciano gained more prominence as the theme of the action drama series FPJ's Ang Probinsyano starring Coco Martin. The theme would go on to be the subject of Internet memes and would later be dubbed the pambansang theme song (Filipino: national theme song).

== Usage in other media ==
Later, it was used for the Maalaala Mo Kaya episode Plano featuring the life of PS/Insp. Garry Erana, one of the casualties of the Mamasapano clash, which starred Coco Martin and Angel Locsin.

It was also used in the 2016 movie The Super Parental Guardians starring Vice Ganda and Coco Martin.
