= Walang Natira =

Single by Gloc-9

from the album Talumpati
- Released: December 2010
- Recorded: 2010
- Genre: Pinoy hip hop
- Label: Musiko Records & Sony Music Philippines Inc.
- Songwriter: Aristotle Pollisco
- Producer: Rudy Y. Tee

Gloc-9 singles chronology
""Martilyo""	"Walang Natira"	""Elmer""

Music video
- "Walang Natira" on YouTube

"Walang Natira" (lit. 'Nothing Left') is the first single of the Filipino rapper, Gloc-9 off his 5th studio album, Talumpati. The song has been written by Gloc-9 and released under Sony Music Philippines. The song also features former Pinoy Dream Academy scholar, Sheng Belmonte. It is an advocacy song dedicated to all Overseas Filipino workers (OFWs) who have opted to work thousands of miles away from their loved ones in an effort to provide a good life for their family. Gloc-9 shared that the song is inspired by his own experience having an OFW Father who worked in Saudi Arabia.

== Message and structure ==
The song tells the situation in the Philippines on why some Filipinos are working abroad. The song also relates the experiences of OFWs while working abroad, like being restless (pahinga’y iipunin para magamit pag-uwi), or sometimes being abused, or dying without even a witness (...gugutumin, sasaktan, malalagay sa peligro. Uuwing nasa kahon ni wala man lang testigo).
