= Ako Si... =

Studio album by Gloc-9
- Released: March 10, 2005
- Genre: Pinoy hip hop
- Label: Star Music
- Producer: Aristotle Pollisco (Gloc-9)

Gloc-9 chronology
G9 (2003)	Ako Si... (2005)	Diploma (2007)

Ako Si... (lit. 'I am...') is the second album and his last album from Star Music of Pinoy rapper, Gloc-9. It has 14 tracks and released under Star Music in 2005.

== Track listing ==
1. D Intro
2. Slick n Sly feat. Slick N Sly Kane
3. Tula
4. Ipagpatawad Mo
5. Love Story Ko
6. English Tracks
7. Get 2 Know You – with Keith Martin
8. My Number
9. Pa'no Kaya? feat. Aj Jr. & Gayle
10. Liwanag – feat Francis Magalona
11. Usap Tayo (Hi-Jakk Diss Track)

Bonus Tracks

1. Nag-iisang Mundo
2. Usap Tayo-extended Mix
3. Liwanag-Acoustic Version

== Album credits ==
- Executive producers: Annabelle M. Regalado, Enrico C. Santos
- Overall album producer: Aristotle Pollisco a.k.a. Gloc-9
- Album supervision: Civ Fontanilla
- Album coordination: Monina B. Quejano
- Publishing coordination: Beth Faustino, Peewee Apostol
- Cover concept: Nixon Sy, Andrew S. Castillo
- Cover layout and design: Andrew S. Castillo, Joseph De Vera
- Photography: Dominique James
