= Upuan =

Single by Gloc-9 featuring Jeazell Grutas of Zelle

from the album Matrikula
- Released: June 22, 2009
- Genre: Pinoy hip hop; Political hip hop
- Length: 4:13
- Label: Musiko Records; Sony Philippines
- Songwriter: Aristotle Pollisco
- Producer: Rudy Tee

Gloc-9 singles chronology
"B.I."	"Upuan"	"Balita"

Music video
- "Upuan" on YouTube

"Upuan" (lit. 'Chair') is the first single of Filipino rapper Gloc-9, from his fourth album Matrikula. The song features Jeazell Grutas, vocalist of the band Zelle. Written by Aristotle Pollisco, the track employs the metaphor of an "upuan" (transl. chair) to symbolize the comfort of those in power, while ordinary people suffer in poverty. It was also associated with "Baha sa Luneta" (lit. 'Flood in Luneta') and "Trillion Peso March" protests held nationwide in September 2025.

The song resurged on social media 16 years after its release amid controversy over multibillion-peso ghost flood control projects. Following its repopularity, the track entered at two Billboard Philippines charts, debuting at number 23 and number 40 on the Top Philippine Songs and Philippines Hot 100 respectively.

== Composition ==
The song was recorded at Sonic State Studio. The track uses the metaphor of an "upuan" (chair) to represent those in power living in comfort while ordinary people struggle in poverty. It also explores the symbolism of corrupt politicians in positions of power, contrasting them with the impoverished populace they are intended to serve.

It opens with the line, "Kayo po na nakaupo, subukan n’yo namang tumayo, at baka matanaw na n’yo ang tunay na kalagayan ko."(transl. "Those of you who are sitting, try standing up, and maybe you will see my true condition.") According to him, the song's meaning extends beyond politics, referring to influential figures in other sectors.

During an interview in 2020, Pollisco told that he wrote the song while on hospital duty as a nursing student. He attributed the inspiration to the environment similar to public hospitals in the Philippines.

== Reception ==
"Upuan" is one of Gloc-9's most successful songs in terms of chart performance, especially in local radio countdowns. The song reached number 17 in the Myx Hit Chart, number 3 in Pinoy Myx Countdown, and both number 1 in The i10 Countdown and Saturday Top 20 of WRR 101.9. The song also topped the charts on 102.7 Star FM while also charting on 91.5 Energy FM, 90.7 Love Radio, and 101.1 YES FM.

Commercially, the song debuted at number 23 on the Billboard's Top Philippine Songs and number 40 on the Philippines Hot 100 on September 13.

== Music video ==
The music video was premiered on Myx music channel on June 29, 2009 and directed by J. Pacena II (who also directed Gloc-9's "Lando", "Balita", "Pangarap" and "Torpedo"). The video was also produced under Sony Music Philippines. It stars (aside from Gloc-9 and Jeazell) Agnes and Paul De Vera, Tom Sembrano and Armand Bentigan.

== Live performances ==
In 2015, during the third of his concert series, "Ang Kwento ng Makata", Gloc-9 performed the song alongside Yeng Constantino. On May 2, 2022, he performed the song at a rally for then-Philippine presidential candidate Leni Robredo in Baguio City.

=== Use in protests ===
Since its release 16 years later, the song resurged on the internet amid the controversy over multibillion-peso ghost flood control projects. In September 2025, the song was associated with nationwide protests, including "Baha sa Luneta" (lit. 'Flood in Luneta') at Rizal Park and the Trillion Peso March at the People Power Monument. The events coincided with the 53rd anniversary of Martial Law and addressed allegations of corruption in flood control projects, which were being investigated in Congress of the Philippines.

== Accolades ==
The song received numerous awards, most of them from the 23rd Awit Awards. The song won in the Best Collaboration, Song of the Year, Best Rap and Best Engineered Recording categories in the 23rd Awit Awards. The song was also nominated in the Best Musical Arrangement category from the same award-giving body and also won as Best Urban Video at the Myx Music Awards 2010.

== Credits and personnel ==
Credits are adapted from Sony Music Philippines.

- Gloc-9 – vocalist, composer
- Jeazell Grutas – vocalist
- Jonathan Ong – arranger, mixing engineer, mastering engineer
- Robert Javier – sound engineer
- Rudy Tee – producer

== Charts ==
Chart performance for "Upuan"
Chart (2025)	Peak position
Philippines (IFPI)	15
Philippines (Philippines Hot 100)	25
Philippines (Top Philippine Songs)	14
