= 1:43 =

1:43 may refer to:

- 1:43 scale, a size of die-cast model cars
- 1:43 (band), a band from the Philippines
