= Myx Music Awards 2012 =

7th annual Myx Music Awards

- Date: March 13, 2012
- Location: Music Museum, Greenhills Shopping Center, San Juan
- Hosted by: Myx video jockeys

Television/radio coverage
- Network: Myx
- Produced by: Myx

Myx Music Awards 2012 was the 7th Myx Music Awards, an annual music awards ceremony established in 2006. Hosted by Myx video jockeys, it was broadcast on Myx. Unlike the other Myx Music Awards, it has no Favorite Indie category, and for the first time fans can vote online through Myxph.com, Twitter and Facebook.

== Winners and nominees ==
Winners are listed first and highlighted in boldface.

Favorite Music Video	Favorite Song
**"20/20" – Pupil (Director: Jason Tan)**; "Gaano Ko Ikaw Kamahal" – Itchyworms (Director: King Palisoc); "Hey Daydreamer" – Somedaydream (Director: Bianca King and Envo Valdez); "Pangarap Lang Kita" – Parokya ni Edgar feat. Happee Sy (Director: Avid Liongoren); "Pera Pera" – Sandwich (Director: Marie Jamora)	**"Pangarap Lang Kita" – Parokya ni Edgar feat. Happee Sy**; "20/20" – Pupil; "Ako Na Lang" – Zia Quizon; "Hey Daydreamer" – Somedaydream; "Walang Natira" – Gloc-9 feat. Sheng Belmonte
Favorite Artist	Favorite Female Artist
**Parokya ni Edgar**; Christian Bautista; Gloc-9; Somedaydream; Yeng Constantino	**Yeng Constantino**; Karylle; Kyla; Sarah Geronimo; Zia Quizon
Favorite Male Artist	Favorite Group
**Gloc-9**; Bamboo; Christian Bautista; Sam Concepcion; Somedaydream	**Parokya ni Edgar**; Itchyworms; Pupil; Slapshock; Sponge Cola
Favorite Mellow Video	Favorite Rock Video
**"Kay Tagal Kitang Hinintay" – Sponge Cola (Director: Yan Yuzon)**; "Hindi Kita Iiwan" – Sam Milby (Director: Treb Monteras); "Lagi" – Kiss Jane (Director: J. Pacena); "Wag Mo Na Munang Sabihin" – Sitti (Director: Rember Gelera); "Wala Na Tayo" – Bbs feat. Kean Cipriano (Director: J. Pacena)	**"Halik" – Kamikazee (Director: Avid Liongoren)**; "20/20" – Pupil (Director: Jason Tan); "Ngayon Na" – Slapshock (Director: Team Manila); "Pera Pera" – Sandwich (Director: Marie Jamora); "Unbelievable" – Chicosci (Director: Tower Of Doom / Paolo Ruiz)
Favorite Urban Video	Favorite New Artist
**"Elmer" – Gloc-9 feat. Jaq Dionisio and Jomal Linao (Director: J. Pacena)**; "Ain't A Crime" – Amber Davis (Director: Luis Daniel Tabuena); "Connection" – Chelo A, Q-York and Jay R (Director: Treb Monteras); "Heartbreaker" – Mobbstarr (Director: Ace Villena); "Kaibigan Lang" (Remix) – Young JV	**Solenn**; Angeline Quinto; Ebe Dancel; Somedaydream; Zia Quizon
Favorite Collaboration	Favorite Remake
**"One Hit Combo" – Parokya ni Edgar feat. Gloc-9**; "Meron Akong Ano" – Kamikazee feat. Chito Miranda, Reg Rubio and Ian Tayao; "Pawiin" – Bbs feat. Kean Cipriano and Jay Durias; "Sari-Saring Kuwento" – Champ feat. Noel Cabangon and Gloc-9; "Walang Natira" – Gloc-9 feat. Sheng Belmonte	**"Unbelievable" – Chicosci**; "Fire" – Solenn; "Forever Young" – Sam Concepcion; "Gaano Ko Ikaw Kamahal" – Itchyworms; "Love Moves In Mysterious Ways" – Christian Bautista feat. Kris Aquino
Favorite Media Soundtrack	Favorite Guest Appearance in a Music Video
**"Fallin'" – Sarah Geronimo (Catch Me, I'm in Love)**; "Bumuhos Man Ang Ulan" – Jericho Rosales (Green Rose); "I'm Already King" – Christian Bautista (A Special Symphony); "Kahit Walang Sabihin" – Rico Blanco (Imortal); "Where Do I Begin" – Gary Valenciano (In the Name of Love)	**Jasmine Curtis ("Hey Daydreamer" – Somedaydream)**; Alodia Gosiengfiao ("All That's Left" – Christian Bautista); Enrique Gil ("Ako Na Lang" – Zia Quizon); JM De Guzman ("Pangarap Lang Kita" – Parokya ni Edgar feat. Happee Sy); Kuya Kim and Eugene Domingo ("Wala Na Tayo" – Bbs feat. Kean Cipriano)
Favorite Myx Celebrity VJ	Favorite Myx Live! Performance
**Somedaydream**; Enchong Dee; Kean Cipriano; Rocksteddy; Sam Concepcion	**Parokya ni Edgar**; Ebe Dancel; Juris; Kyla; Pupil
Favorite International Video	Favorite K-Pop Video
**"Moves Like Jagger" – Maroon 5 feat. Christina Aguilera**; "Born This Way" – Lady Gaga; "Lego House" – Ed Sheeran; "The Lazy Song" – Bruno Mars; "Speak Now" – Taylor Swift	**"Mr. Simple" – Super Junior**; "Break Down" – Kim Hyun Joong; "Lonely" – 2NE1; "The Boys" – Girls' Generation; "Tonight" – Big Bang
Myx Magna Award
**Ryan Cayabyab**
