= Sukli =

Studio album by Gloc-9
- Released: June 5, 2016
- Recorded: 2015–2016
- Genre: Pinoy hip hop
- Length: 38:28
- Label: Star Music

Gloc-9 chronology
Liham at Lihim (2013)	Sukli (2016)	Rotonda (2017)

Sukli (lit. 'Change') is the eighth studio album by Filipino rapper Gloc-9. It was released on June 5, 2016, under Star Music.

"Hoy" was released last May 2016 on MYX and it peaked #5 on Pinoy MYX Countdown & #6 on MYX Daily Top 10.

"Sagwan" was released last December 14, 2016 on MYX. It peaked #10 on Pinoy MYX Countdown (as of December 25, 2016) & #9 on MYX Daily Top 10: Pinoy Edition (as of December 2016).

== Track listing ==
No.	Title	Length
1.	"Barya Lang (Intro)"	0:27
2.	"Hoy"	4:00
3.	"Sukli" (featuring Maya)	3:59
4.	"Industriya" (featuring KZ Tandingan)	6:29
5.	"Sagwan" (featuring Monty Macalino)	5:41
6.	"Kalye" (featuring Yosha)	6:16
7.	"Payag"	4:17
8.	"Ang Probinsyano" (featuring Ebe Dancel)	3:03
9.	"Sukli (Acoustic Version)" (featuring Miro Valera)	4:25
Total length:		38:28
