= Pareho Tayo =

Single by Gloc-9
- Released: 7 January 2016
- Recorded: 2015
- Genre: OPM, Pinoy Hip Hop
- Length: 3:19
- Songwriter: Aristotle Pollisco

Gloc-9 singles chronology
| "Payag" | "Pareho Tayo" |

Pareho Tayo (lit. We Are the Same) is a song written and performed by Gloc-9. It was released independently and is currently available in digital format (free download) through SoundCloud account of the artist.

== Background ==
The song can be downloaded for free through Gloc-9's official SoundCloud account. It is the second song of Gloc-9 to be released independently after the song Payag. The song tackles how one person could relate to what other people go through in their everyday lives, despite their personal differences. Also, some national issues were mentioned in the song like lining up in train stations and how students struggle to finish their studies.

== Commercial performance ==
The song had almost 600 downloads and 8,000 hits in span of one and a half days after its upload.
