= Talumpati =

Studio album by Gloc-9
- Released: February 23, 2011
- Recorded: 2010
- Genre: Pinoy hip hop
- Label: Musiko Records & Sony Music Philippines
- Producer: Rudy Y. Tee; Jonathan Ong

Gloc-9 chronology
Matrikula (2009)	Talumpati (2011)	MKNM: Mga Kwento Ng Makata (2012)

Talumpati (lit. 'Speech') is the 5th (overall) studio album and his last album for Sony Music of Filipino rapper, Gloc-9. It has 16 tracks and released under Musiko Records & Sony Music Philippines. It also features guest appearances from Aiza Seguerra, Yeng Constantino, Top Suzara, Mcoy Fundales, Wency Cornejo, G-Dawg, Sheng Belmonte, Gab Chee Kee, Aia De Leon, Jaq Dionicio, Jomal Linao, Tanya Markova, and Gloc-9's twin sons Daniel and Shaun. The album has been available in the record bars since January 23, 2011, though its launching happened on February 23 in the same year at Eastwood City, Quezon City.

== Background ==
After the release of Matrikula in 2009, Gloc-9 made plans for his next album while studying for his nursing licensure exam. He met up with Jonathan Ong, who had worked with him on an earlier single, to produce his next album. The album blends socio-political commentaries with rap, pop, heavy rock, soul, and reggae, but is more upbeat than his previous album Diploma. The Philippine Daily Inquirer called it "a rebuttal to the incisive, social realism of his previous album, Matrikula”.

Talumpati was released on February 23, 2011, at the Eastwood Central Plaza. With it being released in 2011, it kept up Gloc-9's streak of releasing an album every two years.

=== Single ===
"Walang Natira" is the lead single on this album. It is about the plight of Overseas Filipino Workers (OFWs) and his struggles as a rapper. The song features Pinoy Dream Academy season 2 alumna, Sheng Belmonte.

== Critical reception ==
GMA News praised the album, in regards to its production and storytelling.

== Track listing ==
No.	Title	Length
1.	"walang intro 'Intro ni' Aristotle (ARISTOTLE)" (featuring Top Suzara)
2.	"Buti na Lang" (featuring Mcoy Fundales of Kenyo)
3.	"Bugtong (Riddle)" (featuring Yeng Constantino)
4.	"Akin Lang Naman (On My Part)" (featuring Gordon Lambatan a.k.a. G-Dawg)
5.	"Walang Natira" (featuring Sheng Belmonte)
6.	"Baon" (featuring Gab Chee Kee of Parokya ni Edgar)
7.	"Reporter Part 1"
8.	"Atik Laham (reversed of Mahal Kita which means I Love You)" (featuring Wency Cornejo)
9.	"Tissue"
10.	"Rap Showdown"
11.	"Salbahe" (featuring Tanya Markova)
12.	"Reporter Part 2"
13.	"Elmer" (featuring Jaq Dionisio of Kiss Jane and Jomal Linao of Kamikazee)
14.	"Gusto Ko (I Want)" (featuring Wonder Twins Sean Daniel and Daniele Shaun)
15.	"Kislap (Shine)" (featuring Aiza Seguerra)
16.	"Talumpati (Speech)" (featuring Aia de Leon of Imago and Pointblanc)
