= Zelle (band) =

Filipino alternative pop/rock band

- Origin: Manila, Philippines
- Genres: Alternative rock; pop rock
- Years active: 2007–2011; 2016–present
- Labels: Sony BMG Music Entertainment (Philippines), Inc.
- Members: Jeazell Grutas; Archie Salvador; Chester Ventura; Jing Gonzales; John Abiathar de Leon
- Past members: Anthony Ramirez; Enan Cruz; Jasper Grutas

Zelle is a Filipino alternative pop/rock band.

== Career ==
Formed by and named after the group's female vocalist, Jeazell Grutas, the band released their debut album Search for Warmth in 2007 on Sony BMG, which consists of 11 original songs.

At the Myx Music Awards 2008, the band won the award for Favorite Bandarito Performance.

In 2010, Grutas' collaboration with rap artist Gloc-9, titled "Upuan", won five awards including Song of the Year at the 23rd Awit Awards.

The band disbanded in late 2011 when Grutas married to a Danish national and emigrated abroad.

In 2016, the band came back together to make a self-titled album. In 2020, the band made the album Zelle 2, the sequel to their 2016 album.

== Band members ==
=== Current Members ===
- Jeazell Grutas - lead vocals, acoustic guitar (2007–2011, 2016–present)
- Archie Salvador - lead guitar, backing vocals (2007–2011, 2016–present)
- Chester Ventura - violin (2016–present)
- Jing Gonzales - bass (2016–present)
- John Abiathar de Leon - drums (2016–present)

=== Past Members ===
- Anthony Ramirez - violin/keyboard (2007–2011)
- Enan Cruz - bass (2007–2011)
- Jasper Grutas - drums (2007–2011)

== Discography ==
- Search for Warmth (2007), Sony BMG
- Zelle (2016)
- Zelle 2 (2020)
- Kaya Kong Mabuhay (2020) - single

== Awards and nominations ==
Year	Award giving body	Category	Nominated work	Results
2008	Awit Awards	Best Performance by a New Group Recording Artists (Performance Award)	"Sabihin"	Nominated
2008	Awit Awards	Best Ballad Recording	"Sabihin"	Nominated
2008	Awit Awards	Best Performance by a New Group Recording Artists (People's Choice Award)	"Sabihin"	Nominated
