= Greyhoundz =

Filipino nu metal band

- Origin: Manila/Bohol, Philippines
- Genres: Nu metal; alternative metal; rap metal
- Years active: 1997–present
- Labels: Indie Record Label; Sony Music Philippines (now Ivory Music & Video); PolyEast Records Philippines; MCA Music, Inc.
- Members: Reg Rubio; Niño Avenido; TJ Brillantes; Audie Avenido
- Past members: Allen Cudal (deceased); B-Boy Garcia
- Website: Greyhoundz

Greyhoundz is a Filipino nu metal band based in Manila. Formed in the late 1990s, they gained international recognition for their alternative metal/rap metal sound.

== Background ==
Greyhoundz was formed in 1997 by cousins Niño and Audie Avenido who at first just wanted to join a local battle of the bands contest together with other bandmates that included Allen Cudal. The contest was canceled so they opted to audition at the now defunct Club DREDD that was based in Manila.

They later recruited Reg Rubio, who was from another band that also played at Club Dredd and TJ Brillantes came on board shortly after.

In March 1999, the band signs with Sony Music Philippines. on August 1, 1999, The band launched their debut album "Seven Corners of Your Game" at NU 107's "In The Raw" radio show hosted by Francis Brew Reyes. the album has sold almost 10,000 copies in a month since its release. In May 2002, the album attained platinum status.

In March 2002, the band released their 2nd self titled album. the band released singles "Even" and "Pull". In May 2002 the band launch their first music video on their single "Your Puppet and Clown".

On May 6, 2004, Allen Cudal died from a car accident. The 2004 Pulp SummerSlam was the last time the band performed with their complete line up.

Despite the tragic event and as a sign of respect for their late bandmate, the group now performs as a four-piece band instead of hiring a new member.

On March 28, 2022, Project Ear along with Greyhoundz's Reg Rubio, Ian Tayao of Wilabaliw, and two former Slapshock Members Lean Ansing and Chi Evora released the single "Fade to Black". As a tribute for the late Slapshock frontman Jamir Garcia and rapper D-Coy.

on March 25, 2023, the band released a song "XXV" with Gloc 9 to celebrate the 25th anniversary

In April 13, 2024. the band hold a special vinyl launch show for the re-released at their 1999 album "7 Corners Of Your Game" in vinyl format at Eastside Events Place, Marikina City,

== Behind the name ==
The name “Greyhoundz” was borrowed from the former band of Audie Avenido's father.

== Members ==
- Reg Rubio - vocals
- Niño Avenido - bass guitar
- TJ Brillantes - drums
- Audie Avenido - guitars

=== Former member(s) ===
- Allen Cudal (deceased) - guitars
- B-Boy Garcia - turntables

== Discography ==
Year	Title	Singles	Certification	Label
1999	7 Corners of Your Game	Mr. P.I.G., Party at 802	Platinum	Sony Music
2001	Greyhoundz	Even, Karmic	Platinum	Sony Music
2005	Apoy	Apoy, Doble Kara		PolyEast
2009	Execution Style	Gunner, Shoot to Kill		MCA Music
2026	Photo Album	TBA		alt164 Press

== Singles and videography ==
Singles

- Pigface
- Mr. P.I.G.
- Party at 802
- Taking U High (featuring Jamir Garcia of Slapshock, Ian Tayao of Cheese (later known as Queso), and Bogoy Espejo of Zooom)
- Leech
- Pull
- Even (Asian Edition Soundtrack Album from Spider-Man movie soundtrack)
- Your Puppet and Clown
- Karmic (featuring Ian Tayao of Cheese)
- Bonfires and Sandcastles
- Apoy
- Koro (featuring Gloc 9, Ocho Toleran of Queso, and Francis M.)
- Doble Kara
- Battle Cry (RF Online Theme)
- Shoot To Kill
- Gunner
- Dragon Flies
- Taya
- Gaba
- Ang Bagong Ako (feat. Loonie & B-Boy Garcia of Queso)
- Krus

Videos

- Your Puppet and Clown
- Hole
- Karmic featuring Ian Tayao of Queso
- Apoy
- Koro featuring Gloc 9, Ocho Toleran of Queso, and Francis M.
- Doble Kara
- Shoot To Kill
- Taya
- Ang Bagong Ako (featuring Loonie & B-Boy Garcia of Queso)
- Krus

== Spider-Man official soundtrack ==
Greyhoundz’ song, "Even", was included in the official soundtrack of the blockbuster movie Spider-Man (2002), as one of the Asian Edition Bonus Tracks of the album. The soundtrack also features music from artists such as Alien Ant Farm, The Strokes, Macy Gray and Aerosmith. Greyhoundz is the only Filipino band included in this release. Also, their song, "Hole", was included in the soundtrack of the original The Ring

== Awards and nominations ==
Year	Award giving body	Category	Nominated work	Results
2000	NU Rock Awards	Vocalist of the Year	(for Reg Rubio)	Nominated
2000	NU Rock Awards	Bassist of the Year	(for Niño Avenido)	Nominated
2002	8th Katha Awards	Best Album Design	"Greyhoundz"	Nominated
2002	NU Rock Awards	Bassist of the Year	(for Niño Avenido)	Won
2002	NU Rock Awards	Artist of The Year	—N/a	Nominated
2002	NU Rock Awards	Album of the Year	"Greyhoundz"	Nominated
2002	NU Rock Awards	Best Album Packaging	"Greyhoundz"	Nominated
2002	NU Rock Awards	Song of the Year	"Your Puppet and Clown"	Nominated
2002	NU Rock Awards	Best Rock Video of the Year	"Your Puppet and Clown"	Nominated
2002	NU Rock Awards	Vocalist of the Year	(for Reg Rubio)	Nominated
2002	NU Rock Awards	Drummer of the Year	(for TJ Brilliantes)	Nominated
2002	NU Rock Awards	Producer of the Year	(for Noel Brackinghe)	Nominated
2003	NU Rock Awards	Best Music Video	"Karmic"	Nominated
2005	NU Rock Awards	Bassist of the Year	(for Niño Avenido)	Won
2005	NU Rock Awards	Vocalist of the Year	(for Reg Rubio)	Nominated
2005	NU Rock Awards	Guitarist of the Year	(for Audie Avenido)	Nominated
2005	NU Rock Awards	Drummer of the Year	(for TJ Brillantes)	Nominated
2005	NU Rock Awards	Album of the Year	"Apoy"	Nominated
2006	MYX Music Awards	Favorite Collaboration	"Koro" with Francis Magalona and Gloc9	Nominated
2008	NU Rock Awards	Best Live Act	—N/a	Nominated
2024	37th Awit Awards	Best Rock/Metal Recording	XXV (Featuring Gloc 9)	Won
