= Zia Quizon =

Filipino singer-songwriter and recording artist

- Born: Zia Denise Marie Padilla Quizon; September 23, 1991 (age 34)
- Origin: Manila, Philippines
- Genres: OPM, pop
- Occupations: Singer, songwriter
- Years active: 2011–present
- Labels: PolyEast

Zia Denise Marie Padilla Quizon (born September 23, 1991), known by her stage name Zia Quizon, is a Filipino singer and songwriter. She began her career after being signed to PolyEast Records and releasing her self-titled debut album in 2011.

== Biography ==
Zia Denise Marie Padilla Quizon was born on September 23, 1991. She is the daughter of actor and comedian Dolphy Quizon and actress and singer Zsa Zsa Padilla. She was raised with her older half-sister Karylle and younger sister, Nicole. She has seventeen half-siblings through her father's previous relationships.

== Career ==
Quizon made her debut in October 2011 with an original song called "Ako Na Lang", which was written and produced by Jungee Marcelo. It was the first single from her self-titled debut album. The song was received well commercially and its music video peaked at No. 1 on Myx chart. She then released a second single called "Dear Lonely", written by Kiko Salazar. Her self-titled debut album, Zia, consists of six tracks with three being original composition and the other being covers. She later received many awards for the work from the album including a "Favorite New Artist" award from Myx and a Gold Record Award from ASAP.

On July 7, 2013, she announced that her second studio album be released and will contain mainly original composition than her previous album. The first single from the album premiered on July 8 at My Only Radio FM radio station titled, "Bakit Hindi Ka Crush Ng Crush Mo?", the official theme song for the film of the same name. The song was written by Jungee Marcelo who also wrote her debut single. The music video for the song was released on ABSstarcinema's YouTube channel on July 23. The video's plot features Quizon at a photo shoot session while being pursued by a man who works on set, played by Ramon Bautista who is also the author of the book which the film was based on. The title of her second studio album was later announced to be "A Little Bit Of Lovin'" and was released digitally on July 18. The album contains ten tracks as opposed to her debut album, with eighth original tracks and two covers of "Seven Nation Army" by American rock duo The White Stripes and "Masdan Mo Ang Kapaligiran" from Pinoy rock band Asin. The carrier single "Pasakalye", premiered on July 16.

== Personal life ==
Quizon went to De La Salle University. On July 10, 2012, Quizon's father died at the age of 83. She was in a relationship with Robin Nievera when they first dated in 2017.

On March 4, 2019, Zia admitted suffering from Body dysmorphic disorder. In August 2022, Pops Fernandez said Zia and Robin Nievera were still friends despite the breakup. On July 31, 2022, Zia revealed that she wed "Aleksa Rahul" in Serbia.

== Filmography ==
Television
Year	Title	Role	Notes
2011–present	ASAP	Herself	Regular performer, member of ASAP Jambayan
2012	Sarah G. Live	Herself	Guest Performer
2012	Gandang Gabi, Vice!	Herself	Guest
2025	It's Showtime	Herself	Guest Performer

== Discography ==
Year	Album title and Singles Released	Recording Company	PARI Certification
2011	Zia: Ako Na Lang(Released Jan 1,2011); Dear Lonely (Released Feb 4, 2011)	*PolyEast EMI	Gold
2013	A Little Bit Of Lovin': Katulad Ng Iba (Duet With Gloc 9); Bakit Hindi Ka Crush Ng Crush Mo; Pasakalye	*PolyEast EMI	—

== Awards ==
- 2012 – Gold Record Award for her Debut Album (ASAP)
- 2012 – MYX Music Awards 2012: Favorite New Artist
- 2012 – Awit Award for Best Performance by a Female Recording Artist "Ako Na Lang”
- 2012 – Awit Award for Best Performance by A New Female Recording Artist "Ako Na Lang”
- 2012 – Awit Award for Song of the Year "Ako Na Lang”
- 2012 – Awit Award for Best Engineered Recording: “Simple Girl”
- 2013 GMMSF Box-Office Entertainment Awards – Promising Female Singer/Performer
- 2014 – Awit Awards for Best Performance by a Female Recording Artist – "Pasakalye" & Best Song Written for Movie/TV/Stage Play – "Bakit Di Ka Crush Ng Crush Mo?"
