= 1:43 (band) =

Filipino pop boy band

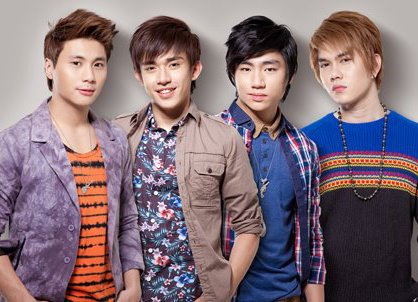
- 1:43 in 2010

Background information
- Also known as: One Forty-Three
- Origin: Manila, Philippines
- Genre: P-pop
- Years active: 2010–2016 (original lineup); 2017–2018; 2021–present (permanent lineup)
- Label: MCA Universal Music, Inc.
- Members: Anjo Resurreccion; Gold Aquino; Yuki Sakamoto; Yheen Valero
- Past members: Kim Nicolas; Kent Malunda; Ronald Golding; Ced Miranda; Art Artienda; Jason Allen; Wayne Avellano

1:43 (pronounced as "one forty-three") is a Filipino pop boy band based in the Philippines. They are signed with MCA Records.

Their debut album titled Time for Love under MCA Records was released on April 27, 2011. The album debuted at No. 2 on Odyssey Records and Videos' list of best-selling OPM albums in its first week and No. 5 overall (including foreign artists).

== History ==
=== 2010: Online debut ===
1:43 debuted on YouTube on November 7, 2010 with their first digital single, "Merry Christmas Na". It was released as a promotional single which made them instant YouTube celebrities.

In 2010, 1:43 was originally composed of Anjo Resurreccion, Gold Aquino, Kim Nicolas, and Yuki Sakamoto.

The 2nd and former line-up includes actor and model Art Artienda, Filipino-Chinese ramp, print, and commercial model Ced Miranda, Filipino-American singer and dancer Jason Allen, and Filipino-Canadian dancer and host Wayne Avellano.

=== 2011: First album ===
1:43 released their first mini-album titled Time for Love on April 27, 2011. It features trivia about and exclusive photos of its members, and a collection of feel-good original Pinoy pop songs, including their minus one versions. It was declared by Odyssey Record Bar as the second bestselling OPM album of the week. It has also landed a few times in the top 10 bestselling OPM album chart of record store Astrovision and Astroplus in 2011.

Time for Love is a mini-album that contains a refreshing mix of five original Filipino pop songs, along with their respective minus one tracks. The album aims to define the sound of today's OPM pop genre by bringing together critically acclaimed producer and arranger Jonathan Ong of SonicState Studio and singer-composer and vocal arranger Myrus in a creative collaboration.

The opening track and single "PiNK (Pag-Ibig Na Kaya?)" is a collaboration track with Myrus.

The group became a part of Tunog Natin: Songs from Home, a compilation album with 16 OPM artists including Pepe Smith, Apo Hiking Society's Jim Paredes, Myrus, Princess Velasco, Gloc-9, Tanya Markova, Arnee Hidalgo, Letter Day Story, Kiss Jane, Mcoy Fundales, Barbie Almalbis, Tricia Garcia, Faith Cuneta, Sheng Belmonte and True Faith.

1:43 released their second album on Mymusicstore.com.ph on September 17, 2012 and the physical album on September 25, 2012 under MCA Music. It was titled Sa Isang Sulyap Mo after their hit song and viral music video. The music video was part of the Mang Inasal Mang Aawit music advocacy program.

The album's carrier single "Sa Isang Sulyap" became a radio hit with listeners, especially among teens.

Sa Isang Sulyap Mo includes all-original tracks co-written by Myrus and the group's manager Chris Cahilig and arranged by Jonathan Ong of SonicState Studio.

"Sa Isang Sulyap" went on to become the official soundtrack of Pinoy Big Brother Teen Edition 4. It has been played in popular TV shows like ASAP 2012, Party Pilipinas, Gandang Gabi Vice, The Buzz, Walang Tulugan and KrisTV, among others.

=== 2012–2013: Sa Isang Sulyap Mo, rise to fame and line-up changes ===
Their single "Sa Isang Sulyap Mo" became popular after being featured in the 2012 reality show, Pinoy Big Brother: Teen Edition 4. The group has since guested in many shows namely Kris TV. Because of this, the song has been revived by many artists including Bryan Termulo for the OST soundtrack of the drama, Juan dela Cruz in 2013.

On August 4, 2012, it was announced that 18-year-old Kent Malunda would be joining the group and was already in the studio to record his vocals for the group's second album. Then on August 7, it was revealed that member Kim Nicholas would be leaving the group and that Malunda was brought in to take his place. A statement on the group's official Facebook page revealed that Nicholas wanted to pursue a career in photography. The band went on to release their debut album, Sa Isang Sulyap Mo, on October 7, 2012.

On February 26, 2013, it was announced that new member Ronald Golding Jr, had replaced Malunda due unknown circumstances. The group went on to have a cameo appearance on Juan dela Cruz on its March 4 episode. They also competed in the noontime variety show, It's Showtime in the Bida Kapamilya: Celebrity Round talent segment on March 11. They went on to release their single, "Ikaw at Ako", on July 4. It premiered on 95.5 Pinas FM. This was the first single to feature member Ronald.

=== 2014: Kalye Pop, new line up ===
On January 15, 2014, the group released their single "Hayop Sa Ganda". The song became "The Most Wanted Song of the Week" on the radio station 97.1 Barangay LS and landed on the station's weekly chart "The Big Ten". The music video for the song premiered on January 28 and featured Miss International Queen 2012 winner Kevin Balot. On March 26, the group announced that their third studio album would be titled "#KalyePop" (Kpop) which was released on April 29. Its lead single, titled "Ang Saya-Saya", was used as the theme song for GMA-7's comedy TV series Ismol Family.

On January 9, 2015, it was announced that Yheen Valero would be joining the band. While there was no formal announcement regarding Golding's departure from the group, he later tweeted on February 9 about pursuing a career as a pilot. On the same month, the group released their single, titled "Tara Na", the first material to feature Valero. The official music video premiered on February 14.

In May 2017, the management of 1:43 announced on the group's official Facebook account its new line up composed of Filipino-Chinese model Agassi Ching, emerging actor and singer Art Artienda, Filipino-American model and dancer Jason Allen, and Filipino-Canadian dancer and model Wayne Avellano. For undisclosed reason, Ching was replaced by Filipino-Chinese model Ced Miranda. The new group released on September 1, 2017 their comeback single "Trapik Tralala", a cover of an Apo Hiking Society song composed by Jim Paredes. They released their second comeback single titled "Pasensya Na" composed by Jayson Dedal on December 8, 2017.

=== 2021–present: 11th Year Anniversary, Original line-up reunion ===
On August 16, there was speculation that the original line-up members of the band will have their reunion in the future. This rumors was started when a film and music production and content creation company Insight 360 posted on YouTube some highlight success hits of the original members from 2010 to 2016 and left a comment below and asked some fans with the question "who wants a comeback from the original line up?"

== Current members ==
- Anjo Resurreccion (2010-present)
- Gold Aquino (2010-present)
- Yuki Sakamoto (2010–present)
- Yheen Valero (2015–present)

== Former members ==
- Kimmeth "Kim" Nicolas (2010–2012)
- Kent Malunda (2012–2013)
- Ronald "Argee" Golding Jr. (2013–2014)
- Agassi Ching (2017)
- Ced Miranda (2017–2018)
- Art Artienda (2017–2018)
- Jason Allen (2017–2018)
- Wayne Avellano (2017–2018)

== Discography ==
=== Albums ===
- Time for Love (EP) (2011)
- Sa Isang Sulyap Mo (EP) (2012)
- #KalyePop (2014)

=== Singles ===
- "Merry Christmas Na" (2010)
- "Sa Isang Sulyap Mo" (2012)
- "Ikaw at Ako" (2013)
- "Hayop Sa Ganda" (2014)
- "Ang Saya-Saya" (2014)
- "Tara Na" (2015)
- "Maria Clara" (2016)
- "Trapik Tralala" (2017)
- "Pasensya Na" (2017)

=== Compilation appearances ===
- Tunog Natin: Songs from Home (2011)

== Awards ==
Year	Award-Giving Body	Category	Work	Result
2013	PMPC Star Music Awards	Song of the Year	"Sa Isang Sulyap Mo"	Won
2014	GMMSF Box-Office Entertainment Awards	Most Promising Recording/Performing Group	"Sa Isang Sulyap Mo"	Won
