= Sirena (song) =

Single by Gloc-9

Single by Gloc-9 featuring Ebe Dancel

from the album MKNM: Mga Kwento ng Makata
- Released: August 25, 2012
- Recorded: 2012
- Genre: Pinoy hip hop, LGBTQ hip hop, conscious hip-hop
- Length: 4:33
- Label: Universal
- Songwriter: Gloc-9
- Producers: Gloc-9; Kathleen Dy-Go

Gloc-9 featuring Ebe Dancel singles chronology
""Hari ng Tondo""	"Sirena"	""Bakit Hindi""

Music video
- "Sirena" on YouTube

"Sirena" (lit. 'Mermaid') is a Tagalog-language song by Filipino rapper Gloc-9. It was released as the lead single from the rapper's sixth album, MKNM: Mga Kwento Ng Makata. The song features Ebe Dancel, the former vocalist of Sugarfree.

== Composition ==
"I think this is the first time that a song about a gay man is presented in a first person's point of view, I worked very hard on this song for it not to be offending to anyone." -Gloc-9

The song is about the life of a gay person ("bakla"), from his childhood to his teenage years until the deathbed of his father.

In a 2024 interview, Gloc-9 revealed that he initially expressed hesitancy to release the song fearing that it might offend some people. He also revealed that "Sirena" is dedicated to his son Sean Daniel who eventually came out as gay in 2022, more than a decade after the song's release.

== Music video ==
The video for "Sirena" was directed by J. Pacena II (who also directed Gloc-9's "Lando", "Balita", "Upuan" among others). The video also features prominent gay personalities like members of the Ladlad Party List such as Danton Remoto and Boy Abunda. The uploaded music video of this song on YouTube reached 2 million views in less than a month. It tells the narration of the events of the song, where the "Sirena" was portrayed by Abner Delina, Jr.

== See also ==
- "Gayuma"
