= Death Threat (hip-hop group) =

Filipino hip hop group

- Also known as: DTG
- Origin: Philippines
- Genre: Pinoy hip hop
- Years active: 1993–present
- Label: Real Deal Productions
- Members: O.G Beware; Konflick Dalubhasa; Phat-L; aka Dyablo; Jo Hussle
- Past members: Hi-Jakkk; Gloc-9; Genezide; Radical MK; O-Dogg (deceased)

Death Threat is a hip-hop group in the Philippines. The group is credited for pioneering gangsta rap in the Philippines and for launching the career of Gloc-9. Death Threat was started in 1992 or 93 when Beware met Genezide.This was the time of the golden age of hip-hop.

== History ==
Death Threat initially consisted of Ron "Beware" Salonga and Gerald "Genezide" Acelajado. Their self-titled debut album Death Threat:Gusto Kong Bumaet was released in 1993. It contained the song "Gusto Kong Bumaet (Pero 'Di Ko Magawa)" (English: "I Want to Become Good (But I Cannot)") which told tales of the daily lives of the young impoverished Filipino youth growing up in the city streets and slum areas. It is considered the first Filipino gangsta rap album and was certified gold.

Three years later, they added more members with emcees Michael P. "Hi-Jakkk" Reyes, and Lawrence "O-Dogg" Panganiban. They were also joined by Aristotle Pollisco. The group suggested him the rap alias "Glock-9". He then changed it to "Gloc-9". Their second album, Death Threat: Wanted contained the song "Ilibing ng Buhay (Ang Mga Sosyal)" (English: "Bury (The Elitists) Alive") with Pooch (the alter-ego of Andrew E.). The song became a hit despite not getting radio play. Another song, "Who's Next?", is considered one of the first Filipino diss tracks written, as they called out rival rappers and the radio station LA 105.9. The album itself was certified double platinum.

Beware left the Philippines after the release of the album, and the group became the duo of Hi-Jakkk and Gloc-9, and released the third album Kings of da Undaground in 1997. Kings of da Undaground went on to become a four-time platinum album. Beware then returned to the Philippines in 1998 to release the album Death Threat: The Return that was recorded in California.

In 2002, Death Threat released another album, Death Threat: Still Wanted. It contained "Private Diane", which featured Ely Buendia and Francis Magalona.

During the 2000s, several members left the group. For a time, Gloc-9 and Hi-Jakkk performed together as a duo, releasing Domination I and Domination II. Hi-Jakk produced and arranged their albums. Gloc-9 then signed with Star Music and became one of the best-selling and most successful hip-hop artists in the Philippines. Hi-Jakkk also became a solo artist, releasing several albums and worked with ABS-CBN Music in 2023. O-Dogg spent the next 15 years as an RTC employee. In 2014, he was shot dead in Muntinlupa.

In 2019, Death Threat performed on the Wish 107.5 bus. They also released "Gusto Kong Bumaet Pero Di Ko Magawa: Part 2". By 2025, Death Threat started the production of "Tha Last Chapter", a 2-disc album produced by Jeuel Param a.k.a. "JPMBeats" consisting of remixed and remastered versions of the rap group's classic and most popular songs.

== Discography ==
=== Albums ===
- 1993: Death Threat: (self titled)
- 1995: Death Threat: Wanted
- 1997: Death Threat: Kings of da Undaground
- 1998: Beware: The Return (O.G. Beware)
- 1999: Reincarnation (compilation album)
- 1999: Genezide: Kasalanan
- 2002: Death Threat: Still Wanted: Da 2nd Chapter
- 2005: Beware: Revenge of tha Undaground
- 2005: Da Best of Death Threat (1993-2003)
- 2014: The Best of Beware (2-disc album)
- 2025: Tha Last Chapter (Disc 1)
- 2026: Tha Last Chapter (Disc 2)
