= MKNM: Mga Kwento ng Makata =

Studio album by Gloc-9
- Released: July 2012
- Recorded: 2012
- Genre: Pinoy hip hop, alternative hip hop
- Label: Universal
- Producer: Gloc-9 (executive), Kathleen Dy-Go(executive)

Gloc-9 chronology
Talumpati (2011)	MKNM: Mga Kwento ng Makata (2012)	Liham at Lihim (2013)

Singles from MKNM: Mga Kwento Ng Makata
- 1. "Sirena" Released: August 2012; 2. "Bakit Hindi" Released: November 2012; 3. "Hindi Mo Nadinig" Released: January 2013

MKNM: Mga Kwento ng Makata (lit. 'The Stories of a Poet') is the 6th overall (first in Universal Records Philippines) album by the Filipino rapper Gloc-9. It has 15 tracks including two bonus tracks: Hari ng Tondo featuring his protégé Denise Barbacena and Kung Tama S'ya featuring Jaq Dionisio of Kissjane.

== Background and composition ==
“I have worked very hard for this album. Before, I would record albums for about two months. For MKNM: Mga Kwento Ng Makata, it took me around six months.” -Gloc-9

== Track listing ==
All tracks are written by Gloc9

No.	Title	{{{extra_column}}}	Length
1.	"Balak ni Syke (Syke's Plan)"
2.	"Apatnapungbara" (featuring Ian Tayao)
3.	"Silup (anadrome of the Tagalog word Pulis which means "Police")" (featuring Denise Barbacena)
4.	"Alalay Ng Hari (King's Assistant)" (featuring Allan Mitchell Silonga)
5.	"Sirena (Mermaid)" (featuring Ebe Dancel)
6.	"Hindi Mo Nadinig (You Haven't Heard/You Didn't Hear)" (featuring Jay Durias)
7.	"Sino (Who)"	(interlude)
8.	"Salarin (Malefactor)" (featuring Bamboo Mañalac)
9.	"Inday (Pinoy slang for maid)" (featuring Cathy Go)
10.	"Bakit Hindi (Why Not)" (featuring Billy Crawford)
11.	"Malakas (Strong)"	(interlude)
12.	"Pison (Steamroller)" (featuring Chito Miranda)
13.	"Thankful" (featuring Maychelle Baay of Moonstar88 and Bambu)
14.	"Hari ng Tondo (King of Tondo)" (featuring Denise Barbacena)
15.	"Kung Tama Siya (If He Is Right)" (featuring Jaq Dionisio of Kissjane)

== Certifications ==
Country	Provider	Certification	Sales
Philippines	PARI	Gold	7,500+
