= Denise Barbacena =

Filipino actress, singer and comedienne

- Born: Denise Ysabel Barbacena; November 2, 1994 (age 31); Manila, Philippines
- Education: Our Lady of Fatima University
- Occupations: Actress; singer; comedienne
- Spouse: Carlos Velasco (m. 2023)
- Musical career
- Genres: Hip hop; alternative hip hop
- Instruments: Vocals; piano
- Years active: 2011–2025
- Labels: Jive; Sony; Universal; GMA

Denise Ysabel Barbacena-Velasco (born November 2, 1994) is a Filipino former actress, singer, comedienne and popularly known as finalist of the first season of the reality show, Protégé: The Battle For The Big Break (2011), a reality search contest, created by GMA Network as an official protégé of Gloc-9.

She is best known for her collaborations with Gloc-9, such as "Hari ng Tondo" and "Dapat Tama". As an actress, she appears in the gag show Bubble Gang as well as other television series such as A1 Ko Sa 'Yo, Legally Blind and Little Nanay. In film, she became part of the main cast of 1st ko si 3rd.

== Career ==
In 2011, Barbacena became a contestant for the talent search show Protégé: The Battle For The Big Break of GMA Network where she represented Mega Manila. Barbacena was chosen by of Gloc 9 to be his protégé in the said television show. She made it to the finals after singing "Pag-ibig Ko'y Pansinin," which was originally recorded by Faith Cuneta. After being eliminated on November 6, 2011, she landed on the eighth place.

Barbacena was featured in Gloc 9's song "Hari ng Tondo." It was used as a theme song for the 2011 film Manila Kingpin: The Asiong Salonga Story and their collaboration won the Best Theme Song in the 60th FAMAS Awards. Another collaboration with Gloc 9 happened in 2013 as they were tapped by GMA News and Public Affairs to do "Dapat Tama," an advocacy campaign jingle for public awareness during mid-term Philippine elections in 2013. In 2014, the campaign including the music video of "Dapat Tama" gained merit honors in the 49th Anvil Awards given by the Public Relations Society of the Philippines under the category Public Relations Programs in a Sustained Basis. For winning the Anvil Awards, the Philippine House of Representatives adopted resolution number 1694 commending the achievement of the "Dapat Tama" campaign.

In 2013, Barbacena joined the cast of Bubble Gang where she had done many comedy skits including spoofing Yaya Dub, the character of Maine Mendoza in "Kalyeserye." Incidentally, in 2017, Barbacena recorded the singles "Aking Tadhana" and "To Be Yours, I'm Destined" for the original soundtrack of Destined to Be Yours, which top billed by Maine Mendoza and Alden Richards. In the pilot episode of Destined to be Yours in February 2017, "Aking Tadhana" topped the iTunes PH list of songs.

She also starred in the comedy series A1 Ko Sa 'Yo in 2016. Barbacena was included in the main cast of the indie film 1st ko si 3rd making her film debut.

== Personal life ==
In 2020, Barbacena finished her bachelor's degree in medical technology from Our Lady of Fatima University. On September 29, 2023, she married her non-showbiz partner, Carlos Velasco.

== Discography ==
=== Singles ===
- "Hari Ng Tondo" - from the original soundtrack of Manila Kingpin: The Asiong Salonga Story
- "Dapat Tama" (ft. Gloc-9) - GMA Network campaign jingle for Philippine elections of 2013
- "Papel" (ft. Joey Ayala & Gloc9 a song finalist for PhilPop Music Festival 2013)
- "Aking Tadhana" and "To Be Yours, I'm Destined" from the original soundtrack of Destined to be Yours
- "My Jagiya" (with Janno Gibbs) - from the original soundtrack of My Korean Jagiya
- "Last Thing I'd Do" - local soundtrack of About Time
- "Aking Mundo" - from the original soundtrack of Bolera
- "Akin Na 'To" - from the original soundtrack of Abot-Kamay na Pangarap
- "Pangako Hanggang sa Dulo" - from the original soundtrack of The Missing Husband

== Filmography ==
=== Television ===
| Year | Title | Role | Notes |
|---|---|---|---|
| 2011 | Protégé: The Battle for the Big Break | Herself / Guest | Contestant |
| 2011–2013 | Party Pilipinas | Herself / Guest | Performer |
| 2012 / 2017 | Tunay Na Buhay | Herself / Guest | Episode Guest |
| 2013–2022 | Bubble Gang | Herself / Various | Mainstay |
| 2013–2014 | Sunday All Stars | Herself / Guest | Performer |
| 2014 | Basta Every Day, Happy! | Herself / Guest | Guest Performer |
| 2015 | Sabado Badoo | Herself / Guest | Cameo Role |
| 2015 | Maynila: Sikretong Malupit | Sandra | Episode Role |
| 2015 | Little Nanay | Trixie | Guest Role |
| 2016 | Maynila: Lucky I'm In Love | Jane | Episode Role |
| 2016 | The Millionaire's Wife | Grace | Guest Role |
| 2016 | Karelasyon | Elisa | Episode Role |
| 2016 | A1 Ko Sa 'Yo | Kaycee Molina | Support Role |
| 2016 | Dear Uge: My Millenial Mom | Majie | Episode Role |
| 2016 | Superstar Duets | Herself / Guest | Contestant |
| 2017 | Legally Blind | Sabrina | Guest Role |
| 2017 | Alyas Robin Hood | Prisoner 1 | Guest Role |
| 2017 | Wish Ko Lang: Si Aileen at si Alexa | Alexa | Episode Role |
| 2017 | Road Trip | Herself / Guest | Episode Role |
| 2017 | Magpakailanman: My Heart Belongs to You (The Bud and Gloria Brown Story) | Gloria | Episode Role |
| 2018 | Contessa | Miadora Jimenez | Support Role |
| 2019 | TODA One I Love | young Dyna | Guest Role |
| 2019 | Dragon Lady | young Ginger | Guest Role |
| 2019 | Hanggang sa Dulo ng Buhay Ko | Brooke | Support Role |
| 2019 | Beautiful Justice | Shine | Guest Role |
| 2020 | I Can See You | Deedee | Series title: Love on the Balcony |
| 2021–22 | All-Out Sundays | Herself / Various | Performer |
| 2021 | Owe My Love | Dolores Santos | Guest Role |
| 2022 | Artikulo 247 | Chi Chi | Support Role |
| 2022 | Happy Together: Kotse | Esther | Episode Role |
| 2022–24 | Abot-Kamay na Pangarap | Dra. Eulalia "Eula" Sarmiento† | Recurring Role |

=== Film ===
Film performances
| Year | Title | Role | Notes |
|---|---|---|---|
| 2014 | 1st ko si 3rd | | Main cast, 2014 Cinemalaya entry (English title: Third Is My First) |

== Awards and nominations ==
The name of the award ceremony, year presented, nominee(s) of the award, award category, and the result of the nomination
| Award ceremony | Year | Category | Nominee(s)/work(s) | Result |
|---|---|---|---|---|
| Aliw Award | 2019 | Best New Female Artist | Herself | Nominated |

== See also ==
- Gloc-9
