= Ebe Dancel =

Filipino musician (born 1976)

- Born: Vincent Ferdinand Layugan Dancel; May 30, 1976 (age 50); Ilagan, Isabela, Philippines
- Origin: Manila, Philippines
- Genres: Alternative rock; Pop rock; Pinoy rock
- Occupation: Musician
- Instruments: Vocals; guitar
- Years active: 1999–present
- Labels: PolyEast Records; Warner Music Philippines; Star Music; Widescope Entertainment
- Formerly of: Cambio (until 2007); Sugarfree (until 2011)

Vincent Ferdinand "Ebe" Layugan Dancel (born May 30, 1976) is a Filipino musician. He was the former lead vocalist of Sugarfree from 1999 to 2011. Following the disbandment of the band, he pursued a solo career and released three albums Dalawang Mukha Ng Pag-Ibig (2011), Bawat Daan (2015) and Baliktanaw (2020).

== Early life ==
Vincent Ferdinand "Ebe" L. Dancel was born on May 30, 1976, in Ilagan, Isabela. He is the fourth of six siblings. He graduated from University of the Philippines Rural High School in Los Baños, Laguna. He later transferred to the University of the Philippines Diliman, where he pursued a degree in Creative Writing and began composing his own music.

== Career ==
=== Sugarfree ===
During his college years, Dancel formed several bands until he met the musicians who would later become his bandmates in Sugarfree in 1999. The group initially signed with Viva Records, but their first album was not released as planned. With help from producer Angee Rozul, their debut album Sa Wakas (2003) was released under EMI Philippines (now PolyEast Records), with production handled in collaboration with Rico Blanco.

Dancel also collaborated with several notable producers on Sugarfree's albums, including Buddy Zabala and Raymund Marasigan for Dramachine (2004), Robin Rivera for Tala-Arawan (2006), and Buddy Zabala who worked on their second album and Romel "Sancho" Sanchez for Mornings and Airports (2009). The resulting albums featured some of the band's most well-known songs, including "Tulog Na", "Hari ng Sablay" and "Makita Kang Muli" achieving mainstream success.

=== Cambio ===
Dancel was also a member of the band Cambio, where he served as co-lead vocalist and lead guitarist alongside Raymund Marasigan, Kris Dancel, Diego Mapa, and Buddy Zabala, until the group disbanded in 2007.

=== Solo career and other works ===
After Sugarfree disbanded in 2011, Dancel pursued a solo career. He also contributed to television soundtracks, including performing "Hanggang Sa Dulo" for the TV5 fantasy series 8 Kingdom (2011). He later released his debut album, Dalawang Mukha Ng Pag-Ibig (2011), which included the single "Maligalig" (2012), a song that gained attention as he performed it while serving as a peace ambassador in Cotabato.

Dancel released his second album Bawat Daan in 2015 under Star Music. A vinyl edition was later released in 2021, featuring ten remastered tracks by Shinji Tanaka at Kodama Studios, and packaged with a gatefold cover and new artwork layout by Ryan de Jesus. He released his third album Baliktanaw (2020), produced by longtime collaborator Chino David. It was produced with the help of Shinji Tanaka, who also worked on Bawat Daan, as well as Hazel Pascua at Kodama Studios and Emil dela Rosa.

In 2024, Dancel released his extended play (EP) Habangbuhay, featuring the songs "Manatili", "Tanging Kailangan", and "Huling Unang Sayaw", under Widescope Records. In an interview with ABS-CBN, he shared that the EP was inspired by how his songs are often used in weddings and same-day edit videos, leading him to create what he called a "wedding soundtrack".

== Artistry ==
According to Billboard Philippines, Dancel's music is known for his poignant lyrics, big choruses, and catchy vocal melodies. On Sugarfree's track "Insomya" (2003) from their album Sa Wakas, Dancel played a simple guitar solo that fit the song's theme of sleeplessness. Also his music is described as having an "acoustic" style and "emotional" lyrics. He started making music after learning to play the guitar, which his brothers borrowed from a neighbor. Many of his songs are based on real-life experiences, and his honest style has made him a well-loved artist in the OPM scene.

== Personal life ==
In 2015, Dancel was diagnosed with depression and anxiety, which he believes he may have experienced since childhood.

Dancel is married to Nikita Dancel. His brother, Vin Dancel, is a lawyer and the lead vocalist of the band Peryodiko. His sister-in-law Kris Gorra Dancel, a former member of Cambio, is the wife of his brother.

== Accolades ==
Award	Year	Category	Recipient(s)	Result	Ref.
35th Awit Awards	2022	Best Ballad Recording	"Manatili"	Won	
35th Awit Awards	2022	People's Voice Favorite Male Artist	Ebe Dancel	Nominated	
37th Awit Awards	2024	Best Collaboration	"Sa Duyan Ng Bayan" by Noel Cabangon, Ebe Dancel, Gloc-9	Nominated	

== Discography ==
=== With Sugarfree ===
- Sa Wakas (2003)
- Dramachine (2004)
- Tala-Arawan (2006)
- Mornings & Airports (2009)

=== With Cambio ===
- Excerpt EP (2003)
- Derby Light (2004)
- Matic (2007)

=== As a solo artist ===
- Dalawang Mukha Ng Pag-Ibig (2011)
- Bawat Daan (2015)
- Baliktanaw (2020)

=== Collaborations ===
- "Para Sa Masa" – with Various Artists (2005)
- "Sirena" – with Gloc-9 (2012)
- "Halik Sa Hangin" – with Abra (2014)
- "Pagmamahal Ngayong Pasko" – with Various Artists (2021)
- "Pasalubong" – with Ben&Ben (2021)
- "Magbabalik" – with Imago (2023)
