= Gloc-9 =

Filipino rapper, singer, and songwriter (born 1977)

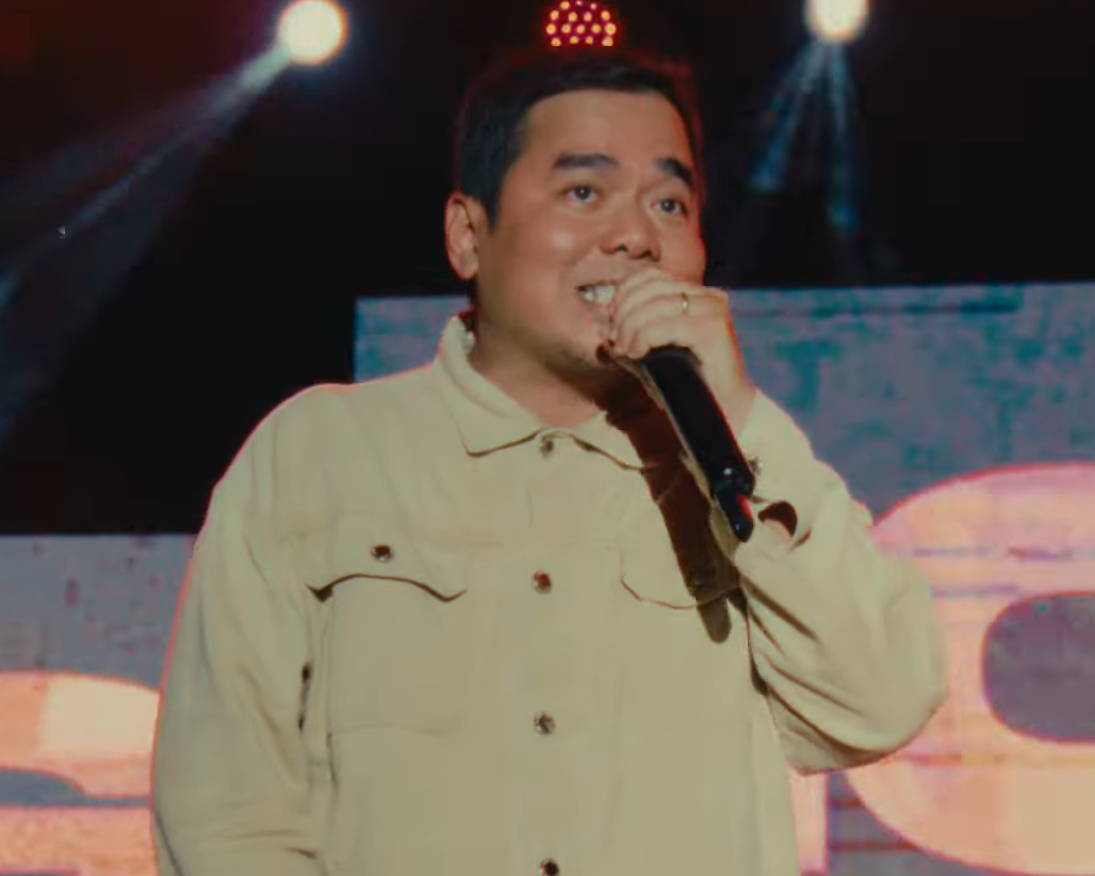
- Gloc-9 in 2024
- Born: Aristotle Condenuevo Pollisco; October 18, 1977 (age 49); Binangonan, Rizal, Philippines
- Occupations: Rapper; singer; songwriter
- Years active: 1992–present
- Spouse: Thea Gomez
- Awards: NCCA Gawad Sudi (National Music Awards) 2010–2020 awardee
- Musical career
- Genres: Pinoy hip hop; alternative hip hop; rap rock; political hip hop
- Instrument: Vocals
- Labels: Star Music (2000–2005, 2016); Sony Music Philippines (2005–2012); Universal Records (2012–2016, 2021– present); Independent (1992–2000, 2020–2021); Asintada
- Website: www.glocdash9.com

Aristotle Condenuevo Pollisco (born October 18, 1977), known professionally as Gloc-9, is a Filipino rapper, singer, and songwriter. Regarded as one of the best Filipino rappers of all time, his fast-flowing chopper vocal style has made him one of the best-selling and most successful hip-hop artists in the Philippines. He was described by fellow Filipino rapper Francis Magalona as "a blacksmith of words and letters, and a true Filipino poet."

He is referred to as a trailblazer and the long-standing giant of the Pinoy Hip-Hop scene. In a career spanning 25 years, Gloc-9 has won over 60 awards including the prestigious 'Sudi National Music Award' by the National Commission for Culture and the Arts. He is also a recipient of 2 FAMAS Awards, 21 Awit Awards, 18 Myx Music Awards and 9 PMPC Star Awards. His albums Liham at Lihim (2013) and MKNM: Mga Kwento Ng Makata (2012) have been certified Platinum and Gold respectively by the Philippine Association of the Record Industry (PARI). In 2019, he was inducted at the Calle Con Hall of Fame.

He has collaborated on almost a dozen songs with other OPM artists; "Lando" with Francis Magalona, "Upuan" with Jaezelle, "Bagsakan" with Parokya ni Edgar and Francis Magalona, "Baon" with Gab Chee Kee and Francis Magalona, and "Sari-Saring Kwento" with Noel Cabangon and Champ Lui Pio. His songs mostly tackle social issues such as social injustices, poverty, and patriotism. He began his musical career with the gangsta rap group Death Threat.

Gloc-9 is notably one of the few artists in the Philippine music scene who has won an award for almost every album he released.

== Career ==
=== In Death Threat ===
In his song "Talumpati", Gloc-9 states that he joined a drive-by show by Andrew E. After the show, a member of the Filipino hip hop group Death Threat came to him then gave a paper on which the contact number of the group's leader Beware (Ronald Salanga) was written. After a phone call with Beware, he joined the group in which he began to make a name for himself in the local underground hip hop scene. His stage name "Gloc-9" came into rising when Beware told him that he must have a rap name to become a rapper. A number of options were suggested: MAGNUM45 and KALIBRE28 were rejected outright, but he decided that Glock 9, minus the "k", sounded catchy.

Death Threat released several albums until one-day Beware had to leave the group and asked Gloc-9 to be the leader of the group together with Hi-Jakk (whom Gloc-9 described as a "rapper who does not know how to rap" in "Talumpati"). In 1997, Death Threat released their third album, "Kings of Da Undaground," but it only features Hi-Jakkk and Gloc-9. The album received 4× platinum certification despite having no mainstream promotion but the only word of mouth in the streets.

=== As duo with Hi-Jakkk ===
Within the same year, the duo of Gloc-9 and Hi-Jakkk started to release albums not carrying the name of Death Threat under Viva Records. These albums are Domination that was certified gold, Tha Revelation certified platinum and Domination II certified gold. In his release "Talumpati", Gloc-9 describes these albums as ones that have not been thought-out and of being full of boastfulness. After their third album together, Gloc-9 was kicked out of the group Death Threat by Beware without any clear reason. Later, Hi-Jakkk decided to leave the group and in 2021, he decided to join Andrew E.'s Dongalo Wreckords.

=== Solo with Star Music ===
While working as a duo, both Gloc-9 and Hi-Jakkk continued to submit their solo demos until the year 2000, when Christian Martinez of Star Music finally discovered Gloc-9's talent after 3 months of searching, when an executive of ABS-CBN accidentally put on his demo from a recording found in a scrap box.

At first, Gloc-9 composed and sang his own songs for soundtracks of several Star Cinema films like Trip and Jologs. In 2002, he also joined Himig Handog Love Songs, a song-writing competition operated by the ABS-CBN Corporation and Star Music with his song "Bakit?" (co-written with Mike Villegas). The song has been interpreted by him together with Cookie Chua, becoming one of the finalists in the competition but without winning the title as the grand prize went to "Kung Ako Na Lang Sana" written by Socrates Villanueva and interpreted by Bituin Escalante. In this song-writing competition, one of his competitors was Jimmy Antiporda with the song "Hindi Na Bale" performed by Jessa Zaragoza. The latter was mentioned in Gloc-9's song "Gusto Ko".

In 2003, Gloc-9 released his debut album under Star Music entitled G9. Included in this album are songs that had been used in several Star Cinema films before. His second album, Ako Si... was released in 2005 under Star Music.

In February 2021, Gloc-9 announced a new album titled Poot at Pag-ibig, which he would be releasing on YouTube one track a day from February 14–19.

== Personal life ==
In a 2024 interview, Gloc-9 revealed that the song "Sirena" is dedicated to his son Sean Daniel who came out as gay in 2022, more than a decade after the song's release.

== Discography ==
=== Studio albums ===
- G9 (2003)
- Ako Si... (2005)
- Diploma (2007)
- Matrikula (2009)
- Talumpati (2011)
- MKNM: Mga Kwento ng Makata (2012)
- Liham at Lihim (2013)
- Sukli (2016)
- Poot at Pag-ibig (2021)
- Pilak (2023)
- Sari-Sari Story (2024)
- Project A (2025)

=== EPs and demos ===
- Limang Kanta Lang (2006)
- Rotonda (2017)
- TULAy (2019)

=== Live albums ===
- Biyahe ng Pangarap (2014)

=== Collaborative and Underground albums ===
- Kings of da Undaground (with Death Threat) (1997)
- Domination (with Hi-Jakkk) (1997)
- Domination II (with Hi-Jakkk) (1999)
- Still Wanted: Da 2nd Chapter (with Death Threat) (2002)

=== Singles ===
- "Hari ng Tondo" (feat. Denise Barbacena) (from the 2011 movie Manila Kingpin: The Asiong Salonga Story)
- "Isang Araw"
- "Tugo-Tugo-Pak" (feat. Vhong Navarro)
- "Laban, Krystala"
- "Sayang"
- "Ako Si"
- "Simpleng Tao"
- "Bakit" (feat. Cooky Chua)
- "Ayoko Na"
- "Masama Yan"
- "Nag-iisang Mundo"
- "Nginig"
- "Tula"
- "Ipagpatawad Mo" (feat. Dzing Macanaya)
- "Love Story Ko"
- "Liwanag" (feat. Francis Magalona)
- "B.I."
- "Jologs"
- "Get 2 Know You" (feat. Keith Martin)
- "Diploma"
- "Lando" (feat. Francis Magalona)
- "Torpedo" (feat. JP Cuison of Kiko Machine)
- "Bagsakan" (feat. Parokya ni Edgar & Francis Magalona) (from their 2005 album Halina Sa Parokya)
- "Sumayaw Ka"
- "Upuan" (feat. Jeazell Grutas of Zelle)
- "Balita" (feat. Gabby Alipe of Urbandub)
- "Martilyo" (feat. Letter Day Story)
- "Walang Natira" (feat. Sheng Belmonte)
- "Elmer" (feat. Jaq Dionisio & Jomal Linao of Kamikazee)
- "Kung Tama Siya" (feat. Jaq Dionisio)
- "One Hit Combo" (feat. Parokya ni Edgar) (from their 2011 album Middle-Age Juvenile Novelty Pop-Rockers)
- "Sirena" (feat. Ebe Dancel)
- "Alalay ng Hari" (feat. Allan Mitchell Silonga)
- "Bakit Hindi" (feat. Billy Crawford)
- "Salarin" (feat. Bamboo)
- "Hindi Mo Nadinig" (feat. Jay Durias)
- "Buti Na Lang" (feat. Mcoy Fundales of Kenyo)
- "Kunwari" (Kamikazee feat. Biboy Garcia & Manuel Legarda)
- "Dapat Tama" (feat. Denise Barbacena) (GMA Network Campaign for Election 2013)
- "Katulad ng Iba" (feat. Zia Quizon)
- "Sikat na si Pepe"
- "Tinta"
- "Magda" (feat. Rico Blanco)
- "Siga" (feat. Quest)
- "Hindi Sapat" (feat. Denise Barbacena)
- "Ipaglaban Mo!" (with KZ Tandingan) (from the 2014 TV series of the same title)
- "Takipsilim" (feat. Regine Velasquez-Alcasid)
- "Pison" (feat. Chito Miranda)
- "Bayad Ko" (feat. Noel Cabangon)
- "Bugtong" (feat. Yeng Constantino)
- "Inday" (feat. Cathy Go)
- "Guitarero" (feat. Denise Barbacena)
- "Ang Parokya" (feat. Parokya ni Edgar & Frank Magalona) (from their 2013 album Bente)
- "Anting-Anting" (Sponge Cola & Denise Barbacena) (Sponge Cola's second single from their fifth album Ultrablessed)
- "Booster C One Shot" (feat. Denise Barbacena)
- "Kasalanan" (6cyclemind)
- "The Bobo Song" (feat. Loonie)
- "Tao" (feat. Cookie Chua)
- "Bituwin" (feat. Allan Mitchel)
- "Kaibigan Ko" (feat. The Hardware Syndrome with Itoy & Willie of the Splindicate Posse)
- "Pangarap" (feat. Raimund Marasigan)
- "Bahala Na" (feat. Moymoy Palaboy & Sisa of Crazy as Pinoy & Biboy)
- "Liwanag" (feat. Francis Magalona)
- "Ako Ay Ikaw Rin"
- "Excuse Me Po"
- "My Number" (feat. Mitchell)
- "Usap Tayo"
- "Lapis at Papel"
- "Kayo" (feat. Mitchell)
- "Okay Ako"
- "Pangarap"
- "Sila" (feat. Loonie & Konflick of Death Threat)
- "Businessman" (feat. Vinci Montaner)
- "Para Sa Bayan" (feat. Lirah Bermudez)
- "Basta't Kasama Ka" (feat. Lirah Bermudez)
- "Hinahanap ng Puso" (feat. Hannah Romawac of Session Road)
- "Pareho Tayo" (feat. Allan Mitchell)
- "Ang Probinsyano" (feat. Ebe Dancel)
- "Hoy!"
- "Sagwan" (feat. Monty Macalino of Mayonnaise)
- "Industriya" (feat. KZ Tandingan)
- "Ice Tubig"
- "Lagi" (feat. Al James)
- "Maleta" (feat. Julie Anne San Jose)
- "Halik" (feat. Flow G of Ex Battalion)
- "Gera Gera" (feat. Raymund Marasigan)
- "Abakada" (with Mark Beats)
- "Tamang Panahon" (with Pio Balbuena)
- "AHON" (feat. Bugoy Drilon)
- "Iba't Ibang Bangka" (feat. Monty Macalino)
- "TANAN" (feat. Lirah)
- "All School"
- "Bahay Ni Gloc-9"
- "Macho Rap" (feat. Lirah) (Inspired by Mang Tomas)
- "Kantang Canton"
- "Kahit Malayo"
- "Sanib" (feat. Loir)
- "ARAW NA ITO"
- "Apoy" (feat. Third Flo')
- "Luma" (Feat. Akbeats by Akuma)
- "Sa 'kin 'Yan" (feat. Honcho of Ex Battalion)
- "Buhay"
- "Tunay"
- "PASAN" (feat. Hero)
- "Saranggola" (feat. Yuridope of Ex Battalion)
- "Bente Kwatro"
- "Langit Lupa" (feat. Hellmerry of Young God Records)
- "Paliwanag" (feat. Yeng Constantino)
- "Maulit Man" (feat. Grace Cristobal)
- "Pag-Nagising Ako" (feat. Jillian Ita-as)
- "BUHOK" (feat. Liezel Garcia)
- "Bahay Yugyugan" (feat. Flow G)
- "Bisekleta sa America"
- "HEBISHRAM" (feat. Hero, Bishnu Paneru & Ramdiss)
- "RESBAK" (feat. Pricetagg, Omar Baliw, CLR, & Shanti Dope)
- "Dash 9"
- "Halimaw" (feat. Abaddon, Smugglaz, & Hero)
- "Ambag" (feat. Shockra)

== Awards ==
Year	Ceremony	Award	Result
2021	6th Wish107. 5 Music Awards	Wish Artist of the YearWish Hip-hop Song of the Year – "ABAKADA" ft. Mark Beats	Won
2019	50th Box Office Entertainment Awards	Male Recording Artist of the Year	Won
2017	12th Myx Music Awards	Favorite Urban Video – "Hoy!"	Won
2017	12th Myx Music Awards	Best Music Video (Special Award) – "Hoy!"	Won
2015	10th Myx Music Awards	Favorite Urban Video – "Businessman"	Won
2015	10th Myx Music Awards	Favorite Collaboration – "Takipsilim" ft. Regine Velasquez-Alcasid	Won
2015	7th PMPC Star Awards for Music	Male Recording Artist of the Year – Biyahe ng Pangarap	Won
2014	9th Myx Music Awards	Favorite Music Video – "Magda"	Won
2014	9th Myx Music Awards	Favorite Song – "Magda"	Won
2014	9th Myx Music Awards	Favorite Urban Video – "Magda"	Won
2014	9th Myx Music Awards	Favorite Collaboration – "Magda" ft. Rico Blanco	Won
2014	6th PMPC Star Awards for Music	Album of the Year – Liham at Lihim	Won
2014	6th PMPC Star Awards for Music	Rap Album of the Year – Liham at Lihim	Won
2014	6th PMPC Star Awards for Music	Rap Artist of the Year	Won
2014	27th Awit Awards	Album of the Year – Liham at Lihim	Won
2014	27th Awit Awards	Song of the Year – "Magda"	Won
2014	27th Awit Awards	Best Novelty Recording – "Papel"	Won
2014	27th Awit Awards	Best Rap Recording – "Magda"	Won
2014	27th Awit Awards	Best Collaboration – "Magda" ft. Rico Blanco	Won
2014	27th Awit Awards	Best Performance by a Group Recording Artists – "Ang Parokya" by Parokya Ni Edgar ft. Gloc-9 and Frank Magalona	Won
2013	8th Myx Music Awards	Favorite Song – "Sirena"	Won
2013	8th Myx Music Awards	Favorite Collaboration – "Sirena" ft. Ebe Dancel	Won
2013	8th Myx Music Awards	Favorite Myx Live! Performance	Won
2013	5th PMPC Star Awards for Music	Music Video of the Year – "Sirena"	Won
2013	26th Awit Awards	Album of the Year – MKNM: Mga Kwento Ng Makata	Won
2013	26th Awit Awards	Song of the Year – "Sirena"	Won
2013	26th Awit Awards	Music Video of the Year – "Sirena"	Won
2012	Globe Tatt Awards 2012	Indie Rocker	Won
2012	7th Myx Music Awards	Favorite Male Artist	Won
2012	7th Myx Music Awards	Favorite Urban Video – "Elmer"	Won
2012	7th Myx Music Awards	Favorite Collaboration – "One Hit Combo" by Parokya Ni Edgar ft. Gloc-9	Won
2012	25th Awit Awards	Best Collaboration – "Walang Natira" ft. Sheng Belmonte	Won
2012	25th Awit Awards	Best Rap Recording – "Walang Natira"	Won
2011	6th Myx Music Awards	Favorite Male Artist	Won
2011	3rd PMPC Star Awards for Music	Music Video of the Year – "Walang Natira"	Won
2011	3rd PMPC Star Awards for Music	Rap Album of the Year – Talumpati	Won
2011	3rd PMPC Star Awards for Music	Rap Artist of the Year	Won
2010	23rd Awit Awards	Song of the Year – "Upuan" (the first Rap Song in the history of Awit Awards)	Won
2010	23rd Awit Awards	Best Rap Recording – "Upuan"	Won
2010	23rd Awit Awards	Best Collaboration – "Upuan"	Won
2010	23rd Awit Awards	Best Sound Engineered – "Upuan"	Won
2010	23rd Awit Awards	Best Rock/Alternative Recording – "Martilyo"	Won
2010	Tambayan 101.9 OPM Awards	Song of the Year – "Upuan"	Won
2010	5th Myx Music Awards	Favorite Urban Video – "Upuan"	Won
2010	Wave891 Urban Music Awards	Best Male Hip Hop	Won
2009	Waki OPM Awards 101.9	Best Dance Hit – "Sumayaw Ka"	Won
2009	Philippine Hip Hop Awards	Rap Artist of the Year	Won
2008	Philippine Hip Hop Awards	Rap Artist of the Year	Won
2008	21st Awit Awards	Best Dance Recording – "Sumayaw Ka"	Won
2007	Philippine Hip Hop Awards	Rap Artist of the Year	Won
2006	Philippine Hip Hop Awards	Rap Artist of the Year	Won
2005	Philippine Hip Hop Awards	Rap Artist of the Year	Won
2005	MTV Pilipinas	Video of the Year – "Sayang"	Won
2003	Awit Awards	Best Christmas Song – "Pasko Na Naman"	Won
2002	Awit Awards	Best Rap Recording – "Isang Araw"	Won
2002	Katha	Best Rap Recording – "Isang Araw"	Won

== See also ==
- Filipino hip hop
- Death Threat (hip hop group)
- Francis Magalona
- List of Filipino hip hop artists
- List of awards and nominations received by Gloc-9
