= Pinoy hip-hop =

Philippine hip hop music and culture

- Other names: Filipino hip hop, Pinoy rap
- Stylistic origins: Hip-hop (United States)
- Cultural origins: Early 1980s, Metro Manila, Philippines
- Typical instruments: voice, turntable, Sampler (musical instrument), drum machine

Subgenres
- Battle rap; conscious rap; Gangsta rap; trap

Fusion genres
- Hip hop-pop; Hip hop-R&B

Regional scenes
- Metro Manila; Cebu City; Davao City; Zamboanga City

Other topics
- Filipino diaspora; FlipTop; Code-switching in music

Pinoy hip-hop, also called Filipino hip-hop or Pinoy rap, is hip-hop music and culture produced in the Philippines and within the Filipino diaspora. Artists perform in Tagalog, English, and regional languages including Cebuano, Ilocano, and Chavacano. Hip-hop practices reached the Philippines in the early 1980s through U.S. media, film, and exchanges around American military facilities and urban nightlife, and by the 1990s locally produced rap and DJ culture had a commercial presence alongside independent scenes.

Scholars note code-switching and multilingual performance as characteristic features, and point to links between Philippine scenes and Filipino American turntablism and production.

== History ==
=== 1980s ===
Hip-hop reached urban communities in and around Manila during the early 1980s through film, recordings, visiting DJs, and cultural exchange with U.S. bases at Clark Air Base and Subic Bay Naval Base. Local crews and mobile sound systems adopted breaking, DJ mixing, and rapping, and early commercial recordings and television exposure followed later in the decade. Influential hip-hop films such as Wild Style (1982), Breakin' (1984), and Krush Groove (1985) circulated in the Philippines and informed early practice. In 1980, Dyords Javier issued "Na Onseng Delight", a parody of "Rapper's Delight" by the Sugarhill Gang. That same year, Vincent Daffalong released singles including "Ispraken-Delight" and "Mahiwagang Nunal". Early breaking crews included Whooze Co. International, The Eclipse, Info-Clash Breakers, and Ground Control, and performers such as Jay "Smooth" MC of Bass Rhyme Posse; mobile DJ crews such as Rock All Parties Crew produced future Pinoy rap figures including Andrew E. and Norman B.

=== 1990s ===
By the early 1990s, Philippine rap albums and singles entered mainstream radio and television, while DJ culture and club competitions expanded. Commentators describe a period of stylistic diversification that included socially aware lyricism, party-oriented singles, and harder-edged narratives. Francis Magalona released Yo! (1990) and Rap Is Francis M (1992), frequently cited for national themes and social commentary. Andrew E. issued "Humanap Ka ng Pangit" (1990), and Michael V. followed with "Maganda ang Piliin" (1991), framed as a response single. The tri-lingual group Rapasia released a self-titled debut (1991), with "Hoy! Tsismosa" mixing Tagalog, Chavacano, and English. Death Threat released Gusto Kong Bumaet in 1994, often cited as the first Filipino gangsta rap album. In the late 1990s, the underground collective Pamilia Dimagiba released Broke-N-Unsigned (Tenement Records), noted for political subject matter that blended hip-hop and Filipino folk elements. The label Dongalo Wreckords was established in 1997.

=== 2000s ===
Independent labels, campus events, and television music channels supported a new wave of artists from Metro Manila and regional centres such as Cebu and Davao. Salbakuta (Dongalo Wreckords) found mainstream success with "Stupid Luv", later adapted for film. In 2005, Aikee released Ang Bawat Bata at age eleven. Rap groups outside Manila gained attention, including Dice & K9 a.k.a. Mobbstarr from Cebu City with "Itsumo" (2003), Thavawenyoz from Davao City with Hubag (2005), and Zambo Top Dogz from Zamboanga City, known for Chavacano tracks "Noticias" and "Conversa Ta". English-dominant acts such as Pikaso, Audible, and Krook and J.O.L.O. drew airplay. Discussion around language use surfaced publicly in 2004 when an opening act at a Black Eyed Peas concert in Manila alleged an "English only" policy for performers. The group Stick Figgas, participants in Francis Magalona's Rappublic of the Philippines project, released Critical Condition (2006).

=== 2010s ===
The FlipTop battle league launched in 2010, popularising filmed a cappella rap battles in the Philippines, with events across Luzon, Visayas, and Mindanao, and millions of views on video platforms.

=== 2020s ===
Major-label initiatives focused on local hip-hop appeared, including Def Jam Philippines projects from 2019 to 2021. The collective 8 Ballin' gained attention with "Know Me" (2021) and later signed to Def Jam Philippines; other signings included JMara, Fateeha, VVS Collective, and Karencitta. Streaming metrics during the mid-2020s showed high domestic engagement with rap, with artists such as Hev Abi leading local charts in 2024. Ez Mil gained international notice when "Panalo" went viral in 2021, and in 2023 he signed a joint deal with Shady Records, Aftermath Entertainment, and Interscope Records.

== Characteristics and language ==
Philippine hip-hop commonly features code-switching between Tagalog and English, and draws on regional languages depending on artist background and audience. Studies of Philippine popular music and discourse describe intra- and inter-sentential switching and audience-address functions that align with bilingual practice in everyday communication. Producers and DJs employ practices shared with global hip-hop, including sampling, scratching, and live performance mixing.

== Elements ==
=== DJing and turntablism ===
From the 1990s onward, Filipino and Filipino American DJs were central to the evolution of hip-hop DJing and turntablism: inventing scratch techniques, winning DMC titles, and founding influential DJ institutions.

- Invisibl Skratch Piklz (ISP), a Bay Area crew formed in the early 1990s, featured Filipino American members DJ Qbert, Mix Master Mike, Shortkut, and DJ Apollo, along with YogaFrog and other collaborators. Invisibl Skratch Piklz pioneered advanced scratch techniques and group routines that helped codify turntablism as an art form.
- Rock Steady DJs, a crew featuring DJ Qbert, Mix Master Mike, and DJ Apollo under the blessing of Crazy Legs, won the 1992 DMC World DJ Championship.
- Triple Threat DJs, founded in the Bay Area in the late 1990s, featured Filipino American members DJ Apollo, Shortkut, and Vinroc, blending battle DJing with club performance and mixtape culture.
- Beat Junkies, a Los Angeles crew, included Filipino American members Shortkut, D-Styles, DJ Babu, Rhettmatic, and Melo-D, among others. Members won national and international championships and later established a DJ school.
- 5th Platoon, a New York crew active in the late 1990s and early 2000s, featured Filipino American members DJ Kuttin Kandi, DJ Roli Rho, DJ Neil Armstrong, and Vinroc, among others.
- DJ Qbert, an ISP co-founder, won the DMC USA title in 1991 and, with Rock Steady DJs and then as the Dream Team pairing with Mix Master Mike, DMC World titles in 1992 to 1994.
- Mix Master Mike, an ISP member, won three consecutive DMC World titles from 1992 to 1994 and later joined the Beastie Boys as their DJ.
- Shortkut, an ISP co-founder and member of Triple Threat DJs and Beat Junkies, helped Alex Aquino establish the International Turntablist Federation (ITF), which formalized technical categories and peer-led judging.
- D-Styles, an ISP and Beat Junkies member, released Phantazmagorea (2002), often cited as an album composed entirely from scratched sounds.
- DJ Babu, Beat Junkies and Dilated Peoples member, is frequently credited in 1990s sources with helping popularise the term "turntablism", particularly via the mixtape Comprehension and the track "Turntablism". Scholarship and journalism note that attribution is contested.

Overall, Filipino and Filipino American DJs won multiple U.S. and world titles in the DMC during the 1990s and 2000s.

==== Institutions ====
- International Turntablist Federation (ITF), founded in the mid-1990s by Alex Aquino with help from Shortkut, introduced technical categories and peer-led judging. Filipino champions such as Vinroc, DJ Babu, and D-Styles brought prominence to the federation and influenced turntablism standards worldwide.
- Thud Rumble, founded in 1996 by DJ Qbert and YogaFrog, developed DJ tools, battle records, and mixers used internationally. The company collaborated with technology firms and promoted turntablism through events and gear innovation.
- Beat Junkie Institute of Sound (BJIOS), founded in 2017 by the Beat Junkies crew in Glendale, California, established a school and online platform for teaching DJing, beat juggling, and turntablism.

==== Other notable turntablists of Filipino heritage ====
Beyond the mainland crews, Filipino American DJs from Hawaiʻi and across the continental United States also achieved early community recognition as individual champions, collaborators, and local scene leaders.

- DJ ELITE (Oʻahu; Hawaiʻi's first hip-hop DJ champion in 1990; co-founder of the DJ and production super-group CrossFade Disciples (CFD) and the rap and production super-group 808 Natives; Creative Director for Elite Empire Creative Studio).
- DJ Skinny Guy (Maui; Hawaiʻi's first DJ to battle in the ITF and DMC competitions in 1996).
- Nokturnal Sound Krew (NSK) (Oʻahu; Filipino American-led crew founded in the late 1990s. Featuring brothers Jami and Compose with cousin Logoe, along with DJs Deception and SSSolution, NSK won consecutive ITF World Team Championships in 2001 and 2002, and helped establish Honolulu as a hub for competitive turntablism).
- DJ Jester the Filipino Fist (San Antonio, Texas; Austin Music Award winner in 2000).
- DJ Deeandroid and DJ Celskiii (San Francisco Bay Area; battle DJs and co-founders of Skratchpad in the mid-2000s. They are also members of the all-female crew La Femme Deadly Venoms (FDV), which competed in the 2010 DMC U.S. Team Battle and performed at international turntablism events).

=== Rapping and vocal performance ===
Sources identify landmark mainstream figures in the Philippines such as Francis Magalona and Gloc-9, and a range of regional-language and English-language performers across decades.

=== Producers ===
Filipino and Filipino American producers have worked across Philippine and international scenes. Chad Hugo of The Neptunes and N.E.R.D. produced hits for U.S. artists including Jay-Z, Nelly, Gwen Stefani, and Snoop Dogg. Producers associated with Philippine projects include label and compilation curators for Def Jam Philippines during the 2020s.

=== Beatboxing ===
Beatboxing appears alongside rapping and DJing in live events and competitions. Xam Penalba, known as The Bigg X, represented the Philippines at the Beatbox Battle World Championship in May 2015. He is associated with the Philippine Human Beatbox Alliance and the group Microphone Mechanics with members G-Who, Leaf, Mouthfx, and Abdhul.

=== Graffiti and visual art ===
Graffiti and street art linked to hip-hop have been present in Manila and other urban centres since the 1980s, with crews and artists active alongside b-boys and DJs. Named practitioners in scene histories include Flip-1, Bonz, Ripe-1, Dope, Chas-1, Meow, and Xzyle, and crews such as Samahan Batang Aerosol (SBA), Pinoy Bomber Crew (PBC), Pinoy Style Insight (PSI), Day Night Bombers (DNB), Katipunan Street Team (KST), and Crime In Style Crew (CIS). In the United States, Oakland's Those Damn Kids (TDK) and the late King Dream (Michael Francisco) are frequently cited in discussions of Filipino American graffiti and hip-hop culture.

== Industry and institutions ==
Media outlets, campus circuits, and independent venues supported the scene through the 1990s and 2000s. In the 2010s, battle leagues and online video platforms increased national reach for rap performances. Stations that programmed R&B, hip-hop, and rap included Power 108 FM and Blazin' 105.9 FM. Former stations such as 89 DMZ continued as internet radio. In 2007, Wave 891 shifted to hip-hop and R&B formats; Monster RX 93.1 also featured hip-hop content. In 2014, Wish 107.5 launched the Wish Mobile Radio Bus for live performance videos; a U.S. counterpart followed in 2018, which contributed to online exposure for Filipino hip-hop acts.

== Regional scenes ==
While Metro Manila dominates commercial production and media coverage, regional scenes in Cebu, Davao, and Zamboanga have produced artists whose releases mix local languages and styles with nationally circulating pop and R&B forms.

== Filipino diaspora ==
Filipino American artists have played a significant role in global hip-hop. Crews such as Invisibl Skratch Piklz and the Beat Junkies advanced turntablism internationally, while producers and rappers including apl.de.ap and Chad Hugo collaborated with U.S. and Philippine artists. Media coverage also highlights Filipino American rappers Ruby Ibarra, Klassy, Rocky Rivera, and Guapdad 4000. In 2023, Ibarra received the Vilcek Foundation Prize for Creative Promise in Music, and in 2025 she won NPR's Tiny Desk Contest for the song "Bakunawa".

== Reception and influence ==
Critics highlight Philippine hip-hop's multilingualism, code-switching, and engagement with social themes in both domestic and diaspora contexts. Studies of DJ culture cite Filipino and Filipino American contributions as central to 1990s turntablism, performance, and pedagogy.

== See also ==
- Music of the Philippines
- Pinoy rock
- Original Pilipino Music
