= Darius Semaña =

Filipino guitarist

- Also known as: Dar, Darioken
- Born: Darius Gerard Laluna Semaña; June 30, 1973 (age 53); Mataasnakahoy, Batangas, Philippines
- Origin: Mataasnakahoy, Batangas
- Genres: Rock, Hard rock, Alternative rock, Funk
- Occupation: Musician
- Instrument: Guitar
- Years active: 1993–present
- Label: Universal Records
- Member of: Parokya ni Edgar

Darius Gerard Laluna Semaña (born June 30, 1973) is a Filipino musician. He is the lead guitarist of the band Parokya ni Edgar and is the oldest member of the group.

== Biography ==
Semaña grew up in Mataasnakahoy, Batangas and attended Fine Arts in the University of the Philippines Diliman in Quezon City. He, along with Vinci Montaner, are the only members of Parokya ni Edgar who have earned a bachelor's degree. It is also publicly known that he is one of two band members who did not attend Ateneo de Manila University, the other member being bassist Buwi Meneses who is lesser known as a non-Atenean graduate and is a childhood friend of Chito Miranda instead. Semaña and Meneses were former bandmates before joining Parokya ni Edgar. Semaña is a high school alumnus of Ateneo's rival school, De La Salle (Lipa City, Batangas branch), which serves as material for many of the band's running jokes in their songs.

Semaña is mostly seen playing a Fender Stratocaster. He is a member of the Tau Gamma Phi fraternity in the Philippines along with bandmate Buwi Meneses.

Semaña is married to a make-up artist and they have a son.

== Discography ==
=== With Parokya ni Edgar ===
- Khangkhungkherrnitz (1996)
- Buruguduystunstugudunstuy (1997)
- Jingle Balls Silent Night Holy Cow (1998)
- Gulong Itlog Gulong (1999)
- Edgar Edgar Musikahan (2002)
- Bigotilyo (2003)
- Halina Sa Parokya (2005)
- Solid (2007)
- Middle-Aged Juvenile Novelty Pop Rockers (2010)
- Pogi Years Old (2016)
- Borbolen (2021)
