= Chito Miranda =

Filipino musician (born 1976)

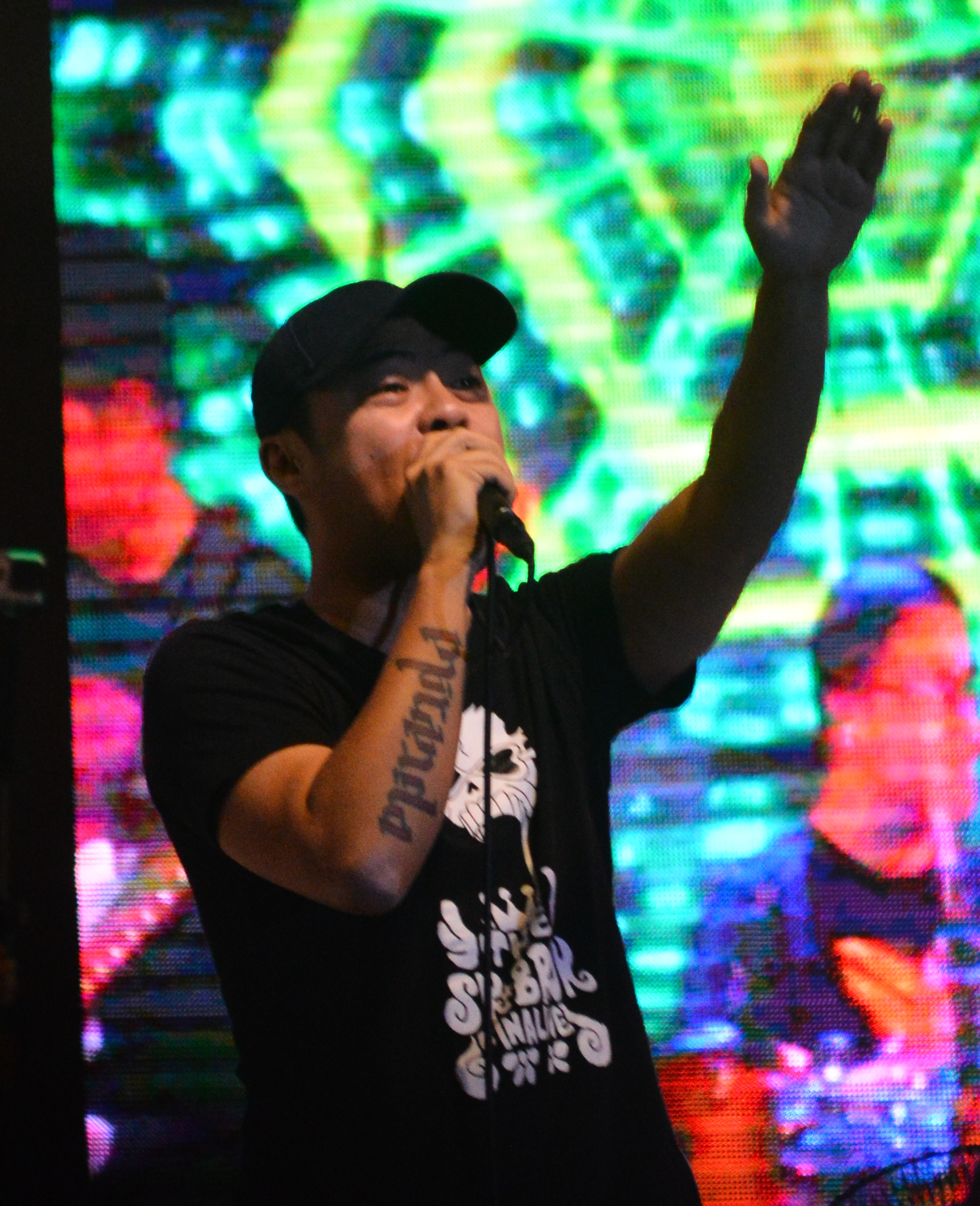
- Miranda in 2016
- Born: Alfonso Yanga Miranda Jr. February 7, 1976 (age 50)
- Education: UP Diliman (B.A.)
- Occupations: Singer-songwriter, actor
- Years active: 1993–present
- Spouse: Neri Naig (m. 2014)
- Relatives: Francis Pangilinan (uncle)
- Musical career
- Genres: Alternative rock; Pinoy rock; comedy rock; hard rock
- Instrument: Vocals, guitar (occasionally), drums (occasionally), keyboards (occasionally)
- Label: Universal Records

Alfonso "Chito" Yanga Miranda Jr. (born February 7, 1976) is a Filipino singer and songwriter, best known as one of the founding members and lead singer for the band Parokya ni Edgar.

== Early life and career ==
Miranda attended grade school and high school at the Ateneo de Manila University where he met Gab Chee Kee, Vinci Montaner, Jeric Estaco, and Mikko Yap. They formed a garage band during their high school years. Miranda attended college at the University of the Philippines Diliman.

The group was known in school to be class clowns. Normally in shows, they would show up in women's clothing to entertain victims of earthquakes and typhoons and sing off-key in poetry readings.

They eventually landed the role of front act band for the locally well-known Filipino alternative rock band Eraserheads. Later on, childhood friend Buwi Meneses and schoolmate Dindin Moreno joined as bassist and drummer, respectively. When they graduated high school, Estaco and Yap decided to leave the group to pursue other interests. Shortly thereafter, Darius Semaña (lead guitar), Meneses's former bandmate, joined to complete the sextet.

Originally Parokya ni Edgar was called 'Comic Relief'. However, they decided to change the name in homage to a Noli me tangere joke in their student days.

Later on, Parokya ni Edgar performed regularly in Club Dredd, one of the famous clubs in Manila during that time. The band slowly gained popularity during the height of the Filipino rock explosion, with the local rock community opening up to the influence of foreign grunge acts such as Nirvana, Pearl Jam and Soundgarden.

Eventually the late managing director of Universal Records, Bella Dy Tan and Alexis Tan signed them as contract artists after witnessing one of their performances at Club Dredd. The band garnered a triple platinum award for their first album Khangkhungkherrnitz.

== Personal life ==
Miranda was born to Alfonso Miranda, a first cousin of senator Francis Pangilinan.

=== Relationships and lifestyle ===
Miranda is good friends with fellow artists Kamikazee vocalist Jay Contreras, and rappers Gloc-9 and Francis Magalona. Miranda is a member of the Alpha Kappa Rho fraternity in Ateneo de Manila University batch 1994. Miranda is also notable amongst the public as a fishing and shooting sports enthusiast. Known to be a heavy smoker since high school, Miranda quit smoking after undergoing an executive health check-up in late 2013.

Miranda was in a relationship with actress Kaye Abad which lasted until 2009. In 2014, Miranda married actress Neri Naig twice: in a civil ceremony on December 13 and in a formal wedding in Tagaytay the following day. In August 2015, Miranda confirmed that Naig had suffered from a miscarriage, which would have been their first child. Their first child, a son, Miggy Alfonso was born in November 22, 2016. Their second child, Manuel Alfonso aka Cash, was born in October 8, 2021. As of December 2021, the couple are also in the process of officially adopting a Pia who is Naig's niece.

=== Sex scandal ===
On August 3, 2013, video clips of Miranda having sexual intercourse with Naig appeared in YouTube. On his Twitter account, Miranda said his room was recently robbed. Among those stolen was his hard disk drive, where photo and video files were stored. Miranda expressed his sadness on the leaking of the private video and apologized. The following month, another video featuring Miranda and Naig was uploaded on Facebook.

== Discography ==
=== With Parokya ni Edgar ===
- Khangkhungkherrnitz (1996)
- Buruguduystunstugudunstuy (1997)
- Jingle Balls Silent Night Holy Cow (1998)
- Gulong Itlog Gulong (1999)
- Edgar Edgar Musikahan (2002)
- Bigotilyo (2003)
- Halina Sa Parokya (2005)
- Solid (2007)
- Middle-Aged Juvenile Novelty Pop Rockers (2010)
- Pogi Years Old (2016)
- Borbolen (2021)

=== As featured artist ===
- "Ligaw" with Moonstar88 (2012)
- "Diwata" with Abra (2014)
- "XGF" with Sponge Cola (2012)
- "Dito sa Kanto" with Noel Cabangon (2001)
- "Salamat Pre" with Salbakuta (2005)

=== Collaborations ===
- "Hosanna Ngayong Pasko" (1998) with Ely Buendia
- "The Ordertaker" (2005) with Kamikazee
- "Panahon Naman ng Harana" (2014) with Rico Blanco
- "Swimming Pool" (2021) with Ben&Ben

== Filmography ==
=== Film ===
- Coming Soon (2013) (Miranda's debut film)

=== Television ===
- Idol Philippines (season 2) (as James Reid's replacement)
- The Voice Generations
