= Gab Chee Kee =

Filipino guitarist and singer-songwriter

- Born: Gabriel Ignatius Juan Chee Kee; July 30, 1976 (age 49); Manila, Philippines
- Genres: Rock, hard rock, soft rock
- Occupations: Musician, singer-guitarist, composer
- Instruments: Guitar, vocals
- Years active: 1993–present
- Label: Universal

Gabriel Ignatius Juan Chee Kee (born July 30, 1976) is a Filipino guitarist, singer, songwriter and one of the founding members of the band Parokya ni Edgar.

== Biography ==
Chee Kee, whose parents are both former teachers, is one of the four members of Parokya ni Edgar who attended Ateneo de Manila University during their grade school to high school years. In 2003, Chee Kee married his then girlfriend, adult entertainer Apple Umali. They separated sometime in 2010.

Chee Kee is known for composing and singing the lead vocals in Parokya ni Edgar's sleeper hit "Your Song (My One and Only You)" from their album Bigotilyo.

Chee Kee was diagnosed with lymphoma in late 2022 for which he started chemotherapy. He kept his diagnosis private and continued performing with Parokya until his doctor advised him to rest. In January 2023, Chee Kee was admitted under intensive care due to pneumonia; his family then publicized his diagnosis. To raise money for Chee Kee's hospital bills, Parokya ni Edgar and fellow musicians Ebe Dancel, Moira Dela Torre, Gloc-9, Shanti Dope, Flow G, Kamikazee, Gracenote and December Avenue held a series of fundraising shows. Parokya memorabilia were also auctioned for the cause. Chee Kee was discharged from the hospital in March 2023 and will continue with his chemotherapy.

== Discography ==
=== With Parokya ni Edgar ===
- Khangkhungkherrnitz (1996)
- Buruguduystunstugudunstuy (1997)
- Jingle Balls Silent Night Holy Cow (1998)
- Gulong Itlog Gulong (1999)
- Edgar Edgar Musikahan (2002)
- Bigotilyo (2003)
- Halina Sa Parokya (2005)
- Solid (2007)
- Middle-Aged Juvenile Novelty Pop Rockers (2010)
- Pogi Years Old (2016)
- Borbolen (2021)

=== Compositions ===
- Sampip
- Lazy
- Swimming Beach
- Superstar
- Y?
- It's Ok
- Absorbing Man
- Tsaka Na Lang
- Sad Trip
- Your Song
- Halina Sa Parokya
- Victor Could
- Nandito
- Don't Think
- Sing

=== As a featured artist ===
- "Baon" with Gloc-9
