= Buwi Meneses =

Filipino musician

- Born: Buhawi Francia Meneses; June 4, 1976 (age 50); Manila, Philippines
- Genres: Rock, hard rock, alternative rock, funk
- Occupation: Musician
- Instruments: bass guitar, vocals
- Years active: 1993–present
- Labels: Universal, MCA Music, Inc.

Buhawi "Buwi" Francia Meneses (born June 4, 1976) is a Filipino bassist for the band Parokya ni Edgar, and formerly for Franco.

== Biography ==
Meneses is the second of four children and only son of breast cancer activist Danny Valenzuela Meneses and the late Rosa Francia-Meneses.

Meneses took up Fine Arts at the University of the Philippines, Diliman. During his second year in the program, he stopped schooling and at the same time took care of his ill mother as she was diagnosed with breast cancer that same year. Not long after, Meneses joined the band of his childhood friend Chito Miranda to form Parokya ni Edgar and pursue a music career.

He won the "Bassist of the Year" award at the NU Rock Awards in 1999 and also wrote the topseller Parokya ni Edgar song “Mr. Suave” in their 2003 album Bigotilyo.

Meneses was one of the castaways for GMA-7's Celebrity Edition of Survivor Philippines in August 2010. He was the 4th castaway to be voted out.

=== Personal life ===
Meneses is married to Febe Meneses who previously worked for GMA-7's Startalk under the moniker Pepita Smith. They have two sons, Zephyr and Zayd. He is a member of Tau Gamma Phi fraternity in the Philippines.

In early 2015, Meneses went on hiatus, relocating with his family to the USA.

== Discography ==
=== With Parokya ni Edgar ===
- Khangkhungkherrnitz (1996)
- Buruguduystunstugudunstuy (1997)
- Jingle Balls Silent Night Holy Cow (1998)
- Gulong Itlog Gulong (1999)
- Edgar Edgar Musikahan (2002)
- Bigotilyo (2003)
- Halina Sa Parokya (2005)
- Solid (2007)
- Middle-Aged Juvenile Novelty Pop Rockers (2010)
- Pogi Years Old (2016)
- Borbolen (2021)

=== With Franco ===
- Franco (2010)

== Television ==
Year	Title	Role	Network
2010	Survivor Philippines: Celebrity Showdown	Himself/Castaway	GMA 7 Kapuso
