= Dindin Moreno =

- Born: Ferdinand Alvarez Moreno; March 16, 1976 (age 50); Quezon City, Philippines
- Genres: Rock, hard rock, soft rock
- Occupation: Musician
- Instrument: Drums
- Years active: 1993–present
- Label: Universal

Ferdinand "Dindin" Alvarez Moreno (born March 16, 1976) is a Filipino drummer for the band Parokya ni Edgar.

== Biography ==
Moreno is one of the four members of Parokya ni Edgar who attended Ateneo de Manila University during their grade school to high school years. He went to UP Diliman and took up Geodetic Engineering in college.

Besides his musical interests, Moreno is an avid technology and gadget hobbyist and is very active in the tech community. He reviews gadgets and writes for tech publications. He is also currently sponsored by a local drums brand.

Moreno currently resides in Manila, with his wife "Billie", and their daughter "Andie" and son "Nacho".

== Discography ==
=== With Parokya ni Edgar ===
- Khangkhungkherrnitz (1996)
- Buruguduystunstugudunstuy (1997)
- Jingle Balls Silent Night Holy Cow (1998)
- Gulong Itlog Gulong (1999)
- Edgar Edgar Musikahan (2002)
- Bigotilyo (2003)
- Halina Sa Parokya (2005)
- Solid (2007)
- Middle-Aged Juvenile Novelty Pop Rockers (2010)
- Pogi Years Old (2016)
- Borbolen (2021)
