= Vinci Montaner =

Filipino singer (born 1976)

- Also known as: Mr. Suave; Mang Jose "The Backup Extraordinaire"
- Born: Francis Vincent Rosales Montaner; November 27, 1976 (age 49); Manila, Philippines
- Genres: Rock, comedy rock, hard rock, alternative rock
- Occupations: Singer, stage actor
- Instruments: Vocals, backup vocals
- Years active: 1993–2012; 2016–present
- Label: Universal Records

Francis Vincent Rosales Montaner (born November 27, 1976) is a Filipino singer best known for his work with the band Parokya ni Edgar where he served as a backup vocalist and one of its founding members. He left Parokya ni Edgar in late 2012 after a near 20-year stint with the band but returned in late 2016.

== Early life and career ==
Montaner was born to Francisco and Mila Montaner and has three siblings nicknamed Chicco, Dikki and Chachi. He finished his lower education levels at the Ateneo de Manila University, and took a college degree course in Public Advertising at the University of the Philippines Manila.

He temporarily left the group in 2005 to finish his education but at the same time was able to contribute to their album Halina sa Parokya and appeared in some of the music videos. He later rejoined the band and appeared on their 2007 album Solid. Montaner is also popularly known by the band's audience as the resident prankster of the group both in music videos and in live performances.

The band's song "The Yes Yes Show" is a satirical song about Chito Miranda and Montaner arguing over the lead vocal duties. Montaner also performed lead vocals on the song "Picha Pie" (Filipino slang term for pizza pie), a parody cover of Gloria Gaynor's "I Will Survive".

He also had occasional gigs with the band Rivermaya after lead singer Jayson Fernandez left in mid-2011.

=== Departure from Parokya ni Edgar ===
At around 2 am of October 14, 2012, he announced through Parokya ni Edgar's official Facebook page that he left the band a couple of weeks back for personal reasons. Chito Miranda immediately confirmed Vinci's departure from the band.

Posted in official Parokya ni Edgar Facebook Fanpage:

Hi! Sorry! I have left the band a couple of weeks back for personal reasons. I won't be back, like what happened before. Continue to support the best band in the world. See you around.

Thank you very much for the love for Parokya!

--Vinci

His last gig with the band before leaving was on September 24, 2012, at 70s Bistro. His former bandmates respected his decision as they parted ways in good terms and still remain very good friends. Miranda stated in an official post that Montaner chose to have a new career path and opted to live privately.

Montaner temporarily reunited with Parokya ni Edgar during the band's launching of their 13th album Bente for its cover art and album signings. Montaner was also part of the recording of Gloc-9's 2014 single entitled "Businessman" and is being featured on its music video as well.

=== Return to Parokya ===
Montaner appeared on the Parokya's tenth studio album as a featured artist entitled Pogi Years Old, which was released on October 17, 2016. He eventually took part in album launches and later fully rejoined the band. He went in hiatus again in 2019.

== Other works ==
Aside from Parokya ni Edgar, Montaner also owns a school for special children and is said to be one of the primary reasons he left Parokya ni Edgar as he wanted to focus in managing the said school.

== Personal life ==
Montaner married in August 2014 then they separated. He is a Roman Catholic.

== Discography ==
=== With Parokya ni Edgar ===
- Khangkhungkherrnitz (1996)
- Buruguduystunstugudunstuy (1997)
- Jingle Balls Silent Night Holy Cow (1998)
- Gulong Itlog Gulong (1999)
- Edgar Edgar Musikahan (2002)
- Bigotilyo (2003)
- Inuman Sessions Vol.1 (2004)
- Halina Sa Parokya (2005)
- Matira Matibay: PG-13 (Singles 1994-2007) (2007)
- Solid (2007)
- Middle-Aged Juvenile Novelty Pop Rockers (2010)
- Inuman Sessions Vol.2 (2012)
- Bente (2013)
- Pogi Years Old (2016)
- Borbolen (2021)

=== Featured single ===
- "Businessman" (Gloc 9, 2014)
