= 9th PMPC Star Awards for Music =

- Date: September 9, 2018
- Venue: Newport Performing Arts Theater, Pasay City
- Hosted by: Karylle; Kim Chiu; Christian Bautista; Aljur Abrenica; Xian Lim

The 9th PMPC Star Awards for Music by the Philippine Movie Press Club (PMPC), honored the best Filipino music of 2016. The ceremony took place on September 9, 2018 in Newport Performing Arts Theater in Pasay.

The PMPC Star Awards for Music was hosted by Kim Chiu, Christian Bautista , Karylle, Aljur Abrenica and Xian Lim.

== Winners and nominees ==
The following are the nominations for the 9th PMPC Star Awards for Music, covering music released in 2016.

Winners are listed first and indicated in bold.

=== Major categories ===
Album of the Year	Song of the Year
**"Say It Again" – Alden Richards (GMA Records)**; "Chasing the Light" – Julie Anne San Jose (GMA Records); "Michael" – Michael Pangilinan (Star Music); "Jona" – Jona (Star Music); "Pogi Years Old" – Parokya Ni Edgar ((Universal Records)); "Soul Supremacy" – KZ Tandingan (Star Music); "Sukli" – Gloc-9 (Star Music)	**"Dahil Sa'yo" – Iñigo Pascual (Star Music)**; "Chasing the Light" – Julie Anne San Jose (GMA Records); "Hanggang Kailan" – Michael Pangilinan (Star Music); "My Destiny" – James Wright (GMA Records); "Paasa" – Yeng Constantino (Star Music); "Rescue Me" – Alden Richards (GMA Records); "Sila" – Sud (Warner Music Philippines)
Male Recording Artist of the Year	Female Recording Artist of the Year
**Martin Nievera – "Kahapon... Ngayon" (PolyEast Records)**; Alden Richards – "Say It Again" (GMA Records); Daniel Padilla – "Greatest Hits and More" (Star Music); Gary Valenciano – "Gary V @Primetime" (Star Music); Lloyd Umali – "Bakit Ka Pa Bumalik?" (8 Trimedia PRO, Inc.); Michael Pangilinan – "Michael" (Star Music); Richard Poon – "Richard x Richard: The Chinito Crooners" (Star Music and Cornerstone Entertainment, Inc.); Piolo Pascual – "Greatest Themes" (Star Music)	**Angeline Quinto – "@LoveAngelineQuinto" (Star Music)**; Charice Pempengco – "Catharsis" (Star Music); Ima Castro – "Ikaw Na Ba?" (8 Trimedia PRO, Inc.); Jennylyn Mercado – "Ultimate" (Ivory Music); Jona – "Jona" (Star Music); Julie Anne San Jose – "Chasing the Light" (GMA Records); KZ Tandingan – "Soul Supremacy" (Star Music); Vina Morales – "Vina XXX" (Star Music)
New Male Recording Artist of the Year	New Female Recording Artist of the Year
**Iñigo Pascual – "Iñigo Pascual" (Star Music); and**; **LA Santos – "LA Santos" (Star Music) (tied)**; Caleb Santos – "Nakaraan" ((Viva Records)); JC del Rosario IV – "Mahika" (Red Line Production); Kian Dionisio – "Kian Dionisio" (GMA Records); I am Ready – "I am Ready" (Warner Music Philippines); Paul Michael – "Istorya ng Buhay, Paul Michael" (Homeworkz Music)	**Ylona Garcia – "My Name is Ylona Garcia" (Star Music)**; Alexa Ilacad – "To The Moon and Back" (Star Music); Aubrey Caraan – "Ang Bagal Mo Chong" (Viva Records); China Gerona – "China Gerona" (Star Music); Ella Cruz – "Sabi na Sa'yo Eh" (Viva Records); Janine Teñoso – "Can Love Find A Way" (Viva Records); Natalia Moon – "May Forever Pa More" (GMA Records); Sassa Dagdag – "Sassy Sassa" (PolyEast Records)
Duo/Group of the Year	Music Video of the Year
**Hashtags – "#Hashtag" (Star Music)**; BoybandPH – "BoyBandPH" (Star Music); Gimme 5 – "Sophomore" (Star Music); Migz and Maya – "Migz and Maya" (Star Music); Parokya ni Edgar – "Pogi Years Old" (Universal Records); Rash Juzen and Aries Concepcion – "R and A Brothers Zodiac Duo" (PolyEast Records); Sponge Cola – "Sinag Tala" (Universal Records); The Juans – "The Juans" (Viva Records)	**"Kailan Darating Ang Ayoko Na?" – Orlando Sol (Star Music)**; **Maryo J. Delos Reyes, director**; "Hoy" – Gloc-9 (Star Music); Paul Basinillo, director; "Hagdan" – Jennylyn Mercado (Ivory Music); Tey Clamor, director; "Hanggang Kailan?" – Michael Pangilinan (Star Music); Frank Lloyd Mamaril, director; "Narinig Mo Ba?" – Julie Anne San Jose (GMA Records); Chris Librojo, director; "Unli" – BoybandPH (Star Music); Peter Edward Dizon, director; "Your Guardian Angel" – Alden Richards (GMA Records); Miggy Tanchanco, director

=== Pop category ===
Pop Album of the Year	Male Pop Artist of the Year
**"Say It Again" – Alden Richards (GMA Records)**; "@LoveAngelineQuinto" – Angeline Quinto (Star Music); "BoybandPH" – BoyBandPH (Star Music); "Iñigo Pascual" – Iñigo Pascual (Star Music); "Chasing the Light" – Julie Anne San Jose (GMA Records); "Handwritten" – Paolo Onesa (HomeworkzEntertainment Services); "My Name is Ylona Garcia" – Ylona Garcia (Star Music)	**Alden Richards – "Say It Again" (GMA Records)**; Daniel Padilla – "Greatest Hits and More" (Star Music); Gary Valenciano – "Gary V @Primetime" (Star Music); Lloyd Umali – "Bakit Ka Pa Bumalik?" (8 Trimedia PRO, Inc.); Martin Nievera – "Kahapon...Ngayon" (PolyEast Records); Michael Pangilinan – "Michael" (Star Music); Richard Poon – "Richard x Richard: The Chinito Crooners" (Star Music and Cornerstone Entertainment, Inc.); Elmo Magalona – "Elmo" (Universal Records); Iñigo Pascual – "Iñigo Pascual" (Star Music); James Wright – "Just Wright" (GMA Records); Joaquin Garcia – "Kahit Kailan" (PolyEast Records); Piolo Pascual – "Greatest Themes" (Star Music)
Female Pop Artist of the Year	
**Julie Anne San Jose – "Chasing the Light" (GMA Records)**; Angeline Quinto – "@LoveAngelineQuinto" (Star Music); Jona – "Jona" (Star Music); Jennylyn Mercado – "Ultimate" (Ivory Music); Myrtle Sarrosa – "Now Playing Myrtle" (Ivory Music); Solenn Heussaff – "Solenn" (Universal Records); Ylona Garcia – "My Name is Ylona Garcia" (Star Music)	

=== Rock, Rap, RnB and Acoustic category ===
Rock Album of the Year	Rock Artist of the Year
**"Sinag Tala" – Sponge Cola (Universal Records)**; "Catharsis" – Charice Pempengco (Star Music); "Pogi Years Old" – Parokya ni Edgar (Universal Records); "Y10" – Yeng Constantino (Star Music)	**Sponge Cola – "Sinag Tala" (Universal Records)**; Charice Pempengco – "Catharsis" (Star Music); Parokya ni Edgar – "Pogi Years Old" (Universal Records); Yeng Constantino – Y10 (Star Music)
RnB Male Artist of the Year	RnB Female Artist of the Year
**Jay R – "Kamusta Ka" (Homeworkz Entertainment Services)**; Michael Pangilinan – "Michael" (Star Music)	**KZ Tandingan – "Soul Supremacy" (Star Music)**
Rap Album of the Year	Rap Artist of the Year
**"Sukli" – Gloc-9 (Star Music)**; The Hybrid Project – "The Hybrid Project" (GMA Records)	**Gloc-9 – "Sukli" (Star Music)**; The Hybrid Project – "The Hybrid Project" (GMA Records)
Acoustic Album of the Year	Acoustic Artist of the Year
**"Kaye Cal" – Kaye Cal (Star Music)**; "I Love Acoustic 10.1" – Sabrina (MCA Music, Inc.); "Kahit Kunwari" – TJ Monterde (PolyEast Records); "Kian Dionisio" – Kian Dionisio (GMA Records); "Migz and Maya" – Migz and Maya (Star Music); "Salubungan" – Johnoy Danao (Universal Records)	**Sabrina – "Love Acoustic 10.1" (MCA Music, Inc.)**; Johnoy Danao – "Salubungan" (Universal Records); Kaye Cal – "Kaye Cal" (Star Music); Kian Dionisio – "Kian Dionisio" (GMA Records); Migz and Maya – "Migz and Maya" (Star Music); TJ Monterde – "Kahit Kunwari" (PolyEast Records)

=== Album category ===
Compilation Album of the Year	Dance Album of the Year
**"Life Songs with Charo Santos" – Various artists (Star Music)**; "A Love to Last: The Official Sound Track" – Various artists (Star Music); "Daniel Padilla Greatest Hits and More" – Daniel Padilla (Star Music); "Gary V @ Primetime" – Gary Valenciano (Star Music); "Mga Awit Mula sa Puso Vol. 7" – Various artists (GMA Records); "Philpop 2017 – Various artists (Viva Records); "Greatest Themes" – Piolo Pascual (Star Music)	**"#Hashtag" – Hashtags (Star Music)**; "BoybandPH" – BoyBandPH (Star Music); "EDM: Enchong Dee Moves" – Enchong Dee (Star Music); "Sophomore" – Gimme 5 (Star Music); "Now Playing: Myrtle" – Myrtle Sarrosa (Ivory Music)
Album Cover of the Year	
**Gary V @ Primetime – Gary Valenciano (Star Music)**; "Say It Again" – Alden Richards (GMA Records); "@LoveAngelineQuinto" – Angeline Quinto (Star Music); "Life Songs with Charo Santos" – Various artists (Star Music); "Kahapon... Ngayon" – Martin Nievera (PolyEast Records); "Richard X Richard (The Chinito Crooners)" – Richard Poon and Richard Yap (Cornerstone Entertainment and Star Music); "Y10" – Yeng Constantino (Star Music)	

=== Concert category ===
Concert of the Year	Male Concert Performer of the Year
**Birit Queens – Angeline Quinto, Morissette, Jona, and Klarisse de Guzman (Star Events and ABS-CBN Events)**; Divas in Manila – Angeline Quinto, Kyla, KZ Tandingan, and Yeng Constantino (Cornerstone Concerts); Masquerade – Lani Misalucha (Star Media Entertainment); Queen of the Night – Jona (Star Events, Big Eyes Events and Creative Media Entertainment); Pusuan Mo si Vice sa Araneta – Vice Ganda (Star Events and ABS-CBN Events); Something New in My Life – Gerald Santos (Twin M Productions International); The Great Unknown: Sarah Geronimo Live at Kia Theatre – Sarah Geronimo (Viva Live Incorporated); Upsurge – Alden Richards (GMA Network and GMA Records)	**Erik Santos – Hugot Playlist (ATeam and PLDT Home)**; Alden Richards – Upsurge (GMA Network and GMA Records); Gerald Santos – Something New In My Life (Twin M Productions International); Martin Nievera – Masquerade (Star Media Entertainment); Ogie Alcasid – Hugot Playlist (ATeam and PLDT Home); Richard Poon – Richard x Richard The Chinito Crooners (Cornerstone Concerts and Star Events); Vice Ganda – Pusuan Mo Si Vice Sa Araneta (Star Events and ABS-CBN Events)
Female Concert Performer of the Year	
**Lani Misalucha – Masquerade (Star Media Entertainment)**; Angeline Quinto – Birit Queens (Star Events and ABS-CBN Events); Jona – Queen of The Night (Star Events, Big Eyes Events and Creative Media); KZ Tandingan – Divas In Manila (Cornerstone Concerts); Kyla – Divas In Manila (Cornerstone Concerts); Morisette – Morisette Live At The Music Museum (Star Events and ABS-CBN Events); Sarah Geronimo – The Great Unknown Live in KIA Theatre (Viva Live Incorporated); Vina Morales – Vina XXX (DSL Events and Production); Yeng Constantino – Divas in Manila (Cornerstone Concerts)	

Note: There were no entries for Alternative Album of the Year and Novelty category

=== Special awards ===
The OPM Icons

- Martin Nievera
- Basil Valdez
- Imelda Papin
- Gary Valenciano
