= Mataasnakahoy =

Municipality in Batangas, Philippines

- Municipality
- Municipality of Mataasnakahoy
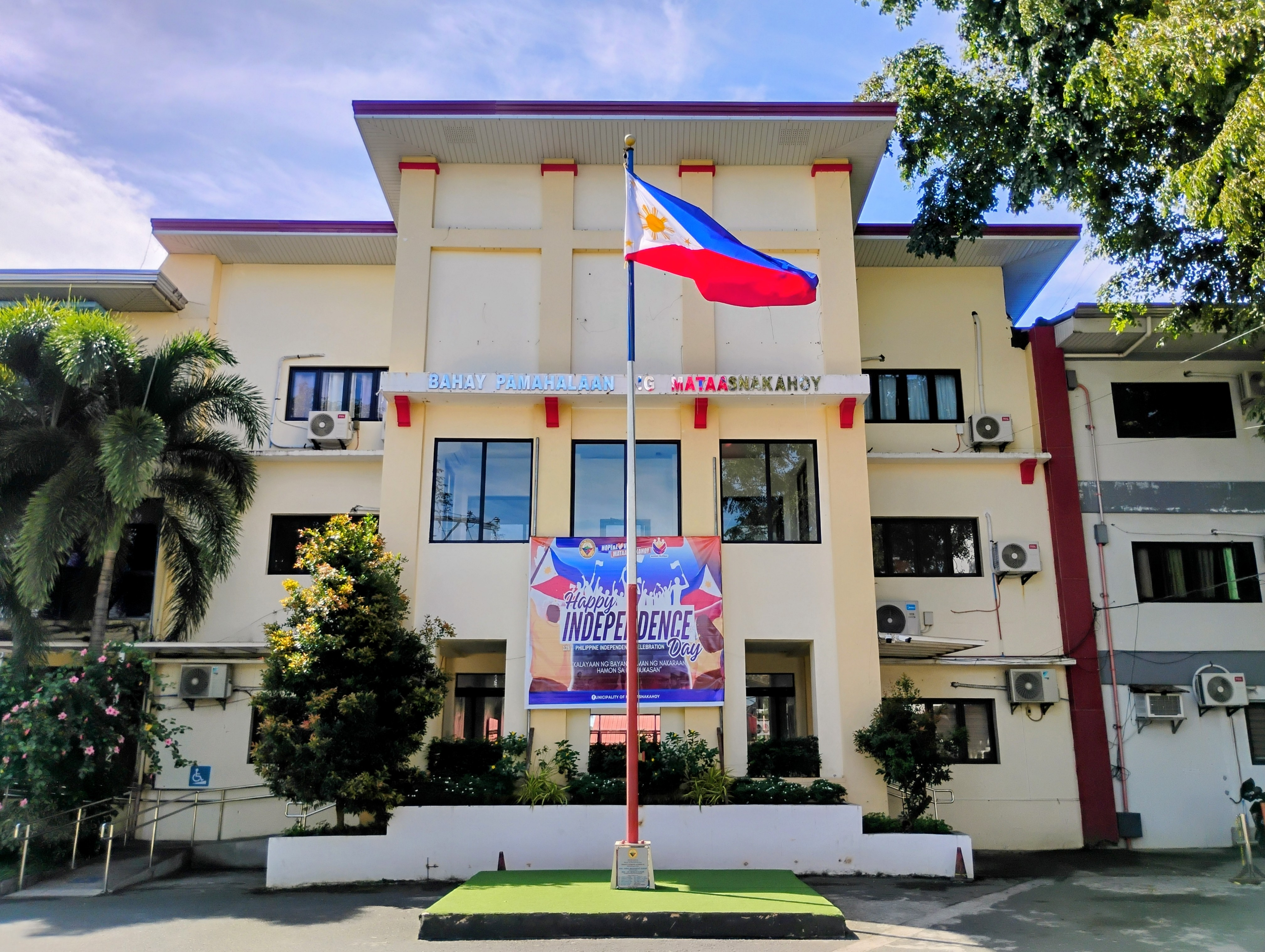
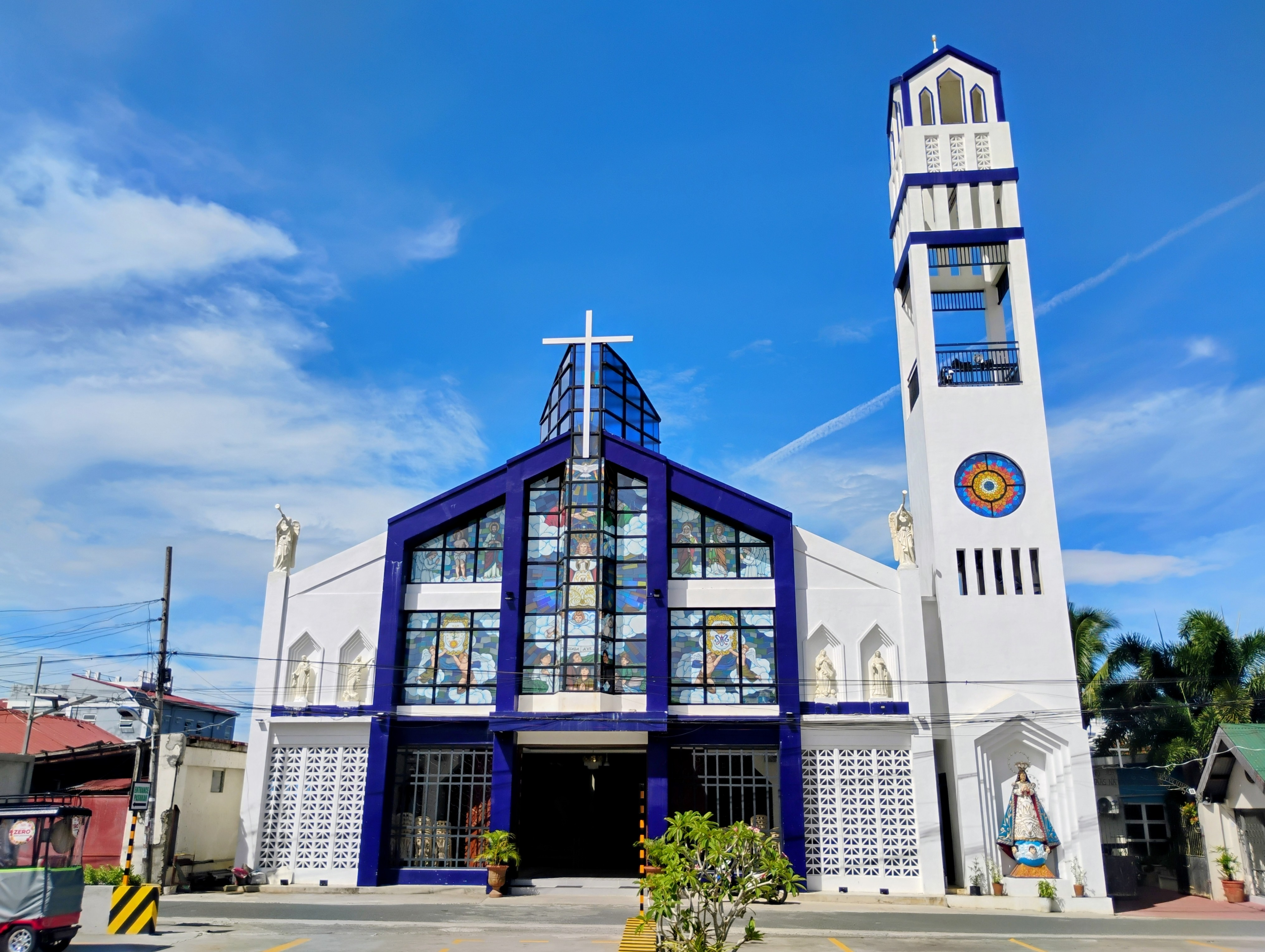
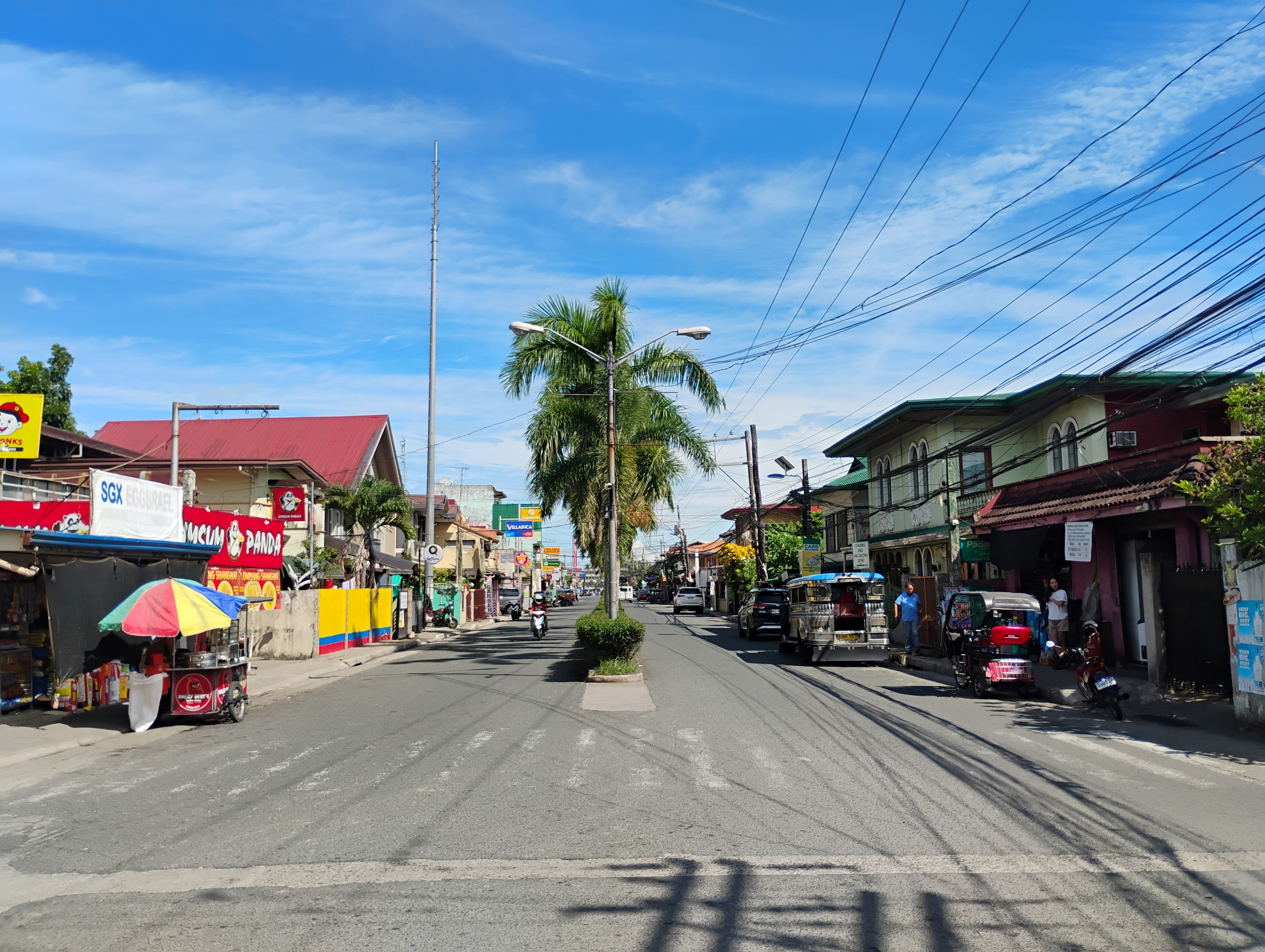
- Mataasnakahoy Municipal Hall Immaculate Conception Parish Church Mataasnakahoy Town Proper

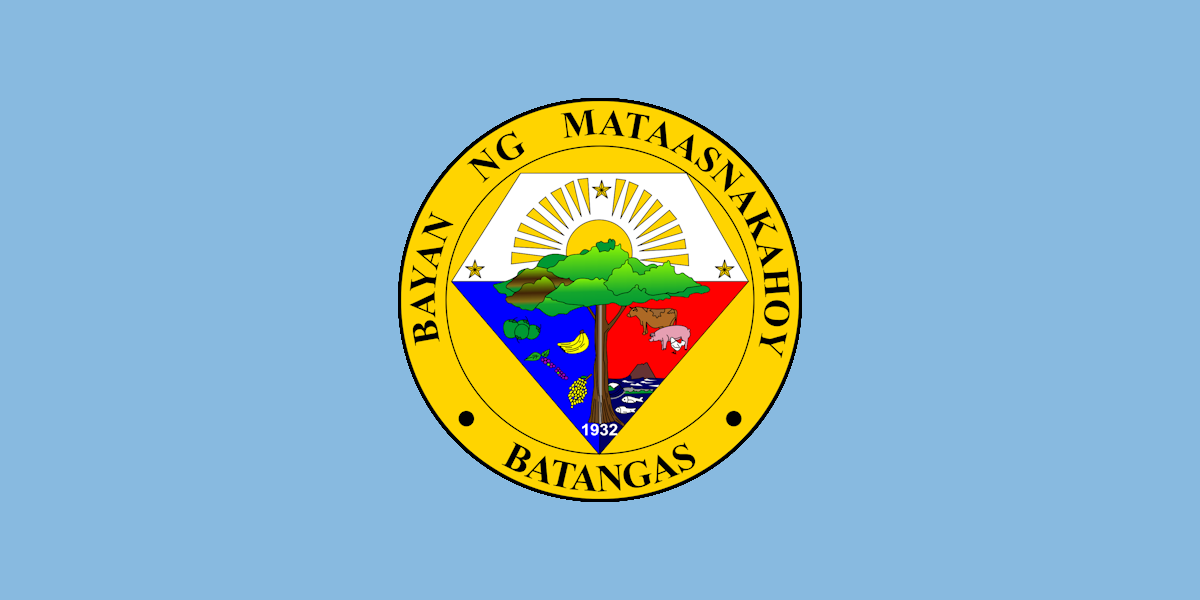
- Flag Seal
- Nicknames: MK, Kahoy
- Map of Batangas with Mataasnakahoy highlighted
- Interactive map of Mataasnakahoy
- Location within the Philippines
- Coordinates: 13°57′33″N 121°06′45″E
- Country: Philippines
- Region: Calabarzon
- Province: Batangas
- District: 3rd district
- Founded: January 2, 1932
- Barangays: 16 (see Barangays)

Government
  - Type: Sangguniang Bayan
  - Mayor: Lucia Ellery L. Gardiola-Silva
  - Vice Mayor: Earel Benedicto L. Gardiola
  - Representative: King George Leandro Antonio V. Collantes
  - Municipal Council: Members: Ferdinand L. Dimaano; Julie Ann G. Silva; Carmelita V. Acerimo; Antonio L. Bathan; Jorgen M. Landicho; Mark Gerico R. Sandoval; Arnel M. Benedicto; Montano S. Dimaculangan
  - Electorate: 22,311 voters (2025)

Area
  - Total: 22.10 km^{2} (8.53 sq mi)
- Elevation: 201 m (659 ft)
- Highest elevation: 410 m (1,350 ft)
- Lowest elevation: 5 m (16 ft)

Population (2024 census)
  - Total: 31,912
  - Density: 1,444/km^{2} (3,740/sq mi)
  - Households: 7,685

Economy
  - Income class: 3rd municipal income class
  - Poverty incidence: 6.15% (2023)
  - Revenue: ₱ 167.5 million (2024)
  - Assets: ₱ 437.9 million (2024)
  - Expenditure: ₱ 83.12 million (2024)
  - Liabilities: ₱ 76.56 million (2024)

Service provider
  - Electricity: Batangas 2 Electric Cooperative (BATELEC 2)
- Time zone: UTC+8 (PST)
- ZIP code: 4223
- PSGC: 0401018000
- IDD : area code: +63 (0)43
- Native languages: Tagalog
- Website: lgumataasnakahoy.com

Mataasnakahoy, officially the Municipality of Mataasnakahoy (Tagalog: Bayan ng Mataasnakahoy), is a municipality in the province of Batangas, Philippines. According to the 2024 census, it has a population of 31,912 people.

== Etymology ==
Although the town's name is always written as one word, it comes from the Tagalog phrase mataás na kahoy, meaning "tall wood." The town’s report for the Historical Data Papers, released in May 1953 by a commission comprising local schoolteachers, dates the name "mataás na kahoy" to 1862. The then-Capitán Municipal (equivalent of a mayor) in Lipa decided to found a settlement in that particular place as a barrio of his town, and the head of the new village recalled a tall tree ("mataás na kahoy") in the area. Additional folklore links the tall tree to a fruit that had cured an old woman of illness.

== History ==
Mataasnakahoy was originally a barrio of Lipa. Its present-day barangay, Lumang Lipa (lit. transl. Old Lipa), served as the second municipal seat of Lipa from 1724 to 1754, until it was relocated to Balete due to an eruption of the Taal Volcano.

Mataasnakahoy was created as a municipality through Executive Order No. 308 signed by acting Governor-General of the Philippines George C. Butte on March 27, 1931, effective on January 2, 1932.

During World War II, the Empire of Japan expanded Lipa Air Base a kilometre away from Mataasnakahoy's población. The Imperial Japanese Army Air Service occupied the town, burning many homes and massacring male residents. After the war, the town was rapidly rehabilitated.

== Geography ==
According to the Philippine Statistics Authority, the municipality has a land area of 22.10 square kilometers (8.53 sq mi) constituting 0.71% of the 3,119.75-square-kilometer (1,204.54 sq mi) total area of Batangas.

Mataasnakahoy has 16 barangays and its total land area is 22.10 square kilometers (8.53 sq mi). It is bounded by Balete and Lipa with Taal Lake on its western edge. The town is known for its cool climate due to its high elevation of 379 meters (1,243 ft).

=== Barangays ===
Mataasnakahoy is politically subdivided into 16 barangays, as indicated in the matrix below. Each barangay consists of puroks and some have sitios.

PSGC	Barangay	Population			±% p.a.	
		2024		2010		
041018001	District I (Poblacion)	7.3%	2,324	2,153	▴	0.53%
041018002	District II (Poblacion)	7.3%	2,314	2,222	▴	0.28%
041018003	District III (Poblacion)	9.9%	3,158	3,099	▴	0.13%
041018004	District IV (Poblacion)	5.3%	1,699	1,698	▴	0.00%
041018006	Bayorbor	3.4%	1,076	966	▴	0.75%
041018008	Bubuyan	4.4%	1,412	1,204	▴	1.11%
041018009	Calingatan	9.6%	3,067	2,550	▴	1.29%
041018010	Kinalaglagan	7.7%	2,446	2,377	▴	0.20%
041018011	Loob	3.4%	1,093	1,007	▴	0.57%
041018012	Lumang Lipa	6.5%	2,088	1,974	▴	0.39%
041018013	Manggahan	2.6%	819	740	▴	0.71%
041018014	Nangkaan	7.4%	2,374	2,217	▴	0.48%
041018015	San Sebastian	2.5%	809	748	▴	0.54%
041018016	Santol	5.8%	1,837	1,749	▴	0.34%
041018017	Upa	5.3%	1,685	1,483	▴	0.89%
041018018	Barangay II‑A (Poblacion)	3.1%	986	990	▾	−0.03%
	Total		31,912	27,177	▴	1.12%

=== Climate ===
Climate data for Mataasnakahoy
Month	Jan	Feb	Mar	Apr	May	Jun	Jul	Aug	Sep	Oct	Nov	Dec	Year
Mean daily maximum °C (°F)	26 (79)	28 (82)	29 (84)	31 (88)	29 (84)	28 (82)	27 (81)	26 (79)	26 (79)	27 (81)	27 (81)	26 (79)	28 (82)
Mean daily minimum °C (°F)	17 (63)	17 (63)	18 (64)	20 (68)	22 (72)	22 (72)	22 (72)	22 (72)	22 (72)	21 (70)	19 (66)	18 (64)	20 (68)
Average precipitation mm (inches)	11 (0.4)	13 (0.5)	14 (0.6)	32 (1.3)	101 (4.0)	142 (5.6)	208 (8.2)	187 (7.4)	175 (6.9)	131 (5.2)	68 (2.7)	39 (1.5)	1,121 (44.3)
Average rainy days	5.2	5.0	7.4	11.5	19.8	23.5	27.0	25.9	25.2	23.2	15.5	8.3	197.5
Source: Meteoblue (modeled/calculated data, not measured locally)

== Demographics ==
Population census of Mataasnakahoy

Year	Pop.	±% p.a.
1939	4,692	—
1948	5,487	+1.75%
1960	7,744	+2.91%
1970	9,885	+2.47%
1975	10,928	+2.03%
1980	12,057	+1.99%
1990	15,240	+2.37%

Year	Pop.	±% p.a.
1995	16,726	+1.76%
2000	20,706	+4.68%
2007	25,400	+2.86%
2010	27,177	+2.49%
2015	29,187	+1.37%
2020	30,621	+1.01%
2024	31,912	+1.00%

Source: Philippine Statistics Authority

In the 2024 census, Mataasnakahoy had a population of 31,912 people. The population density was 1,400 inhabitants per square kilometer (3,600/sq mi).

=== Religion ===
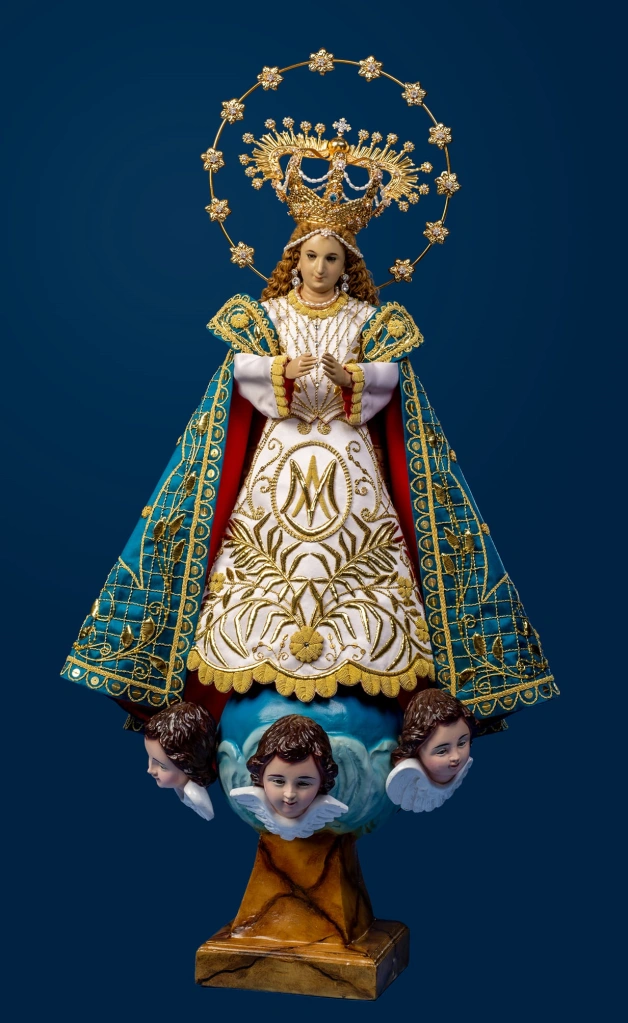
La Inmaculada Concepción de Mataasnakahoy

The townsfolk are predominantly Roman Catholic, with minorities belonging to other religious groups like the Iglesia ni Cristo, United Methodist Church, Baptist denominations, Jehovah's Witnesses, Jesus is Lord Church and Members Church of God International.

The Patroness of Mataasnakahoy is the Blessed Virgin Mary of the Immaculate Conception. The devotion to her started in 1874 which later grew significantly through its episcopal coronation on December 8, 2022. Following this, the Sangguniang Bayan ng Mataasnakahoy declared her patronage through the Resolution No. 31-039-S-2025, released on October 7, 2025, recognizing her as the "Mother, Queen and Patroness of the Town of Mataasnakahoy." This declaration, officially proclaimed on November 29, 2025, recognizes the "Nuestra Señora de la Inmaculada Concepción" as "Ang Birhen ng Mataasnakahoy."

== Economy ==
Poverty incidence of Mataasnakahoy (%)

Source: Philippine Statistics Authority

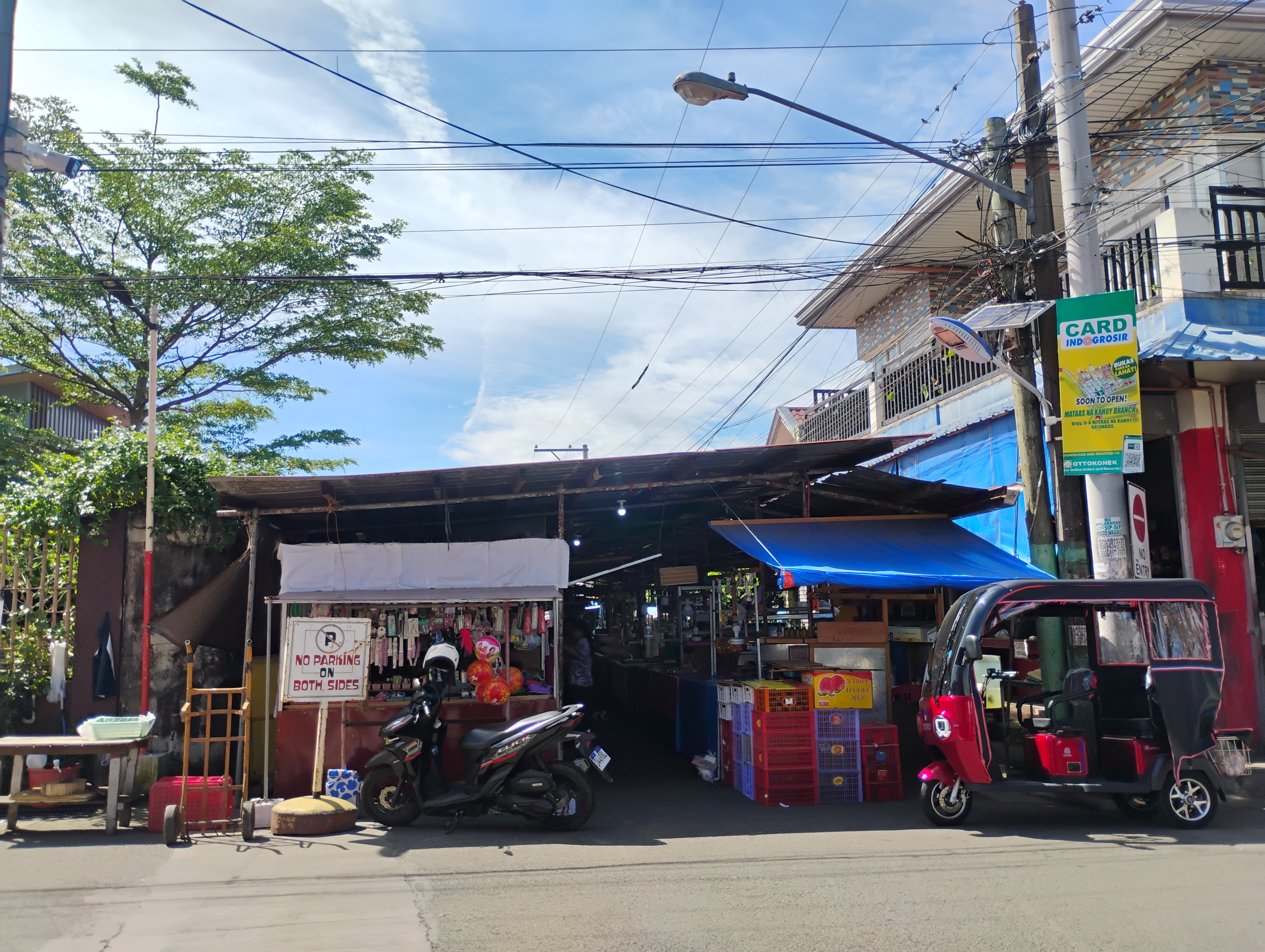
Mataasnakahoy Public Market

Its economy is primarily agricultural with coffee, coconut and banana as the major crops. Fish culture, with milkfish and tilapia being the major culture species, is also practiced in the coastal barangays of Nangkaan, Lumang Lipa and Kinalaglagan. Piggery and poultry farms from backyard to large scale operation represent a big part of the town's economy. Supporting the town's agribusiness are two feed mills namely, MAGICORP and AICOM.

Several banks (Mataasnakahoy Rural Bank, Lipa Development Bank, Savings and Loan Association of Mataasnakahoy) serve the townspeople. Small businesses like stores and groceries abound and the town center has a flea market (talipapa or tiangge) where fresh fish, meat and vegetables are available daily and a pharmacy, Generika Drugstore. Several small garment factories partly fuel the town's business activity. Telephone service and internet access are available.

=== Residential development ===
Residential subdivisions (Victomar, Crisanta Homes, Immaculate Conception Village, Sinforosa and Monte Vista, among others) have started real estate development in the town. Gawad Kalinga, a free house and lot project for the poor sponsored by the religious organization Couples for Christ, is also established in Barangay Bubuyan.

== Government ==
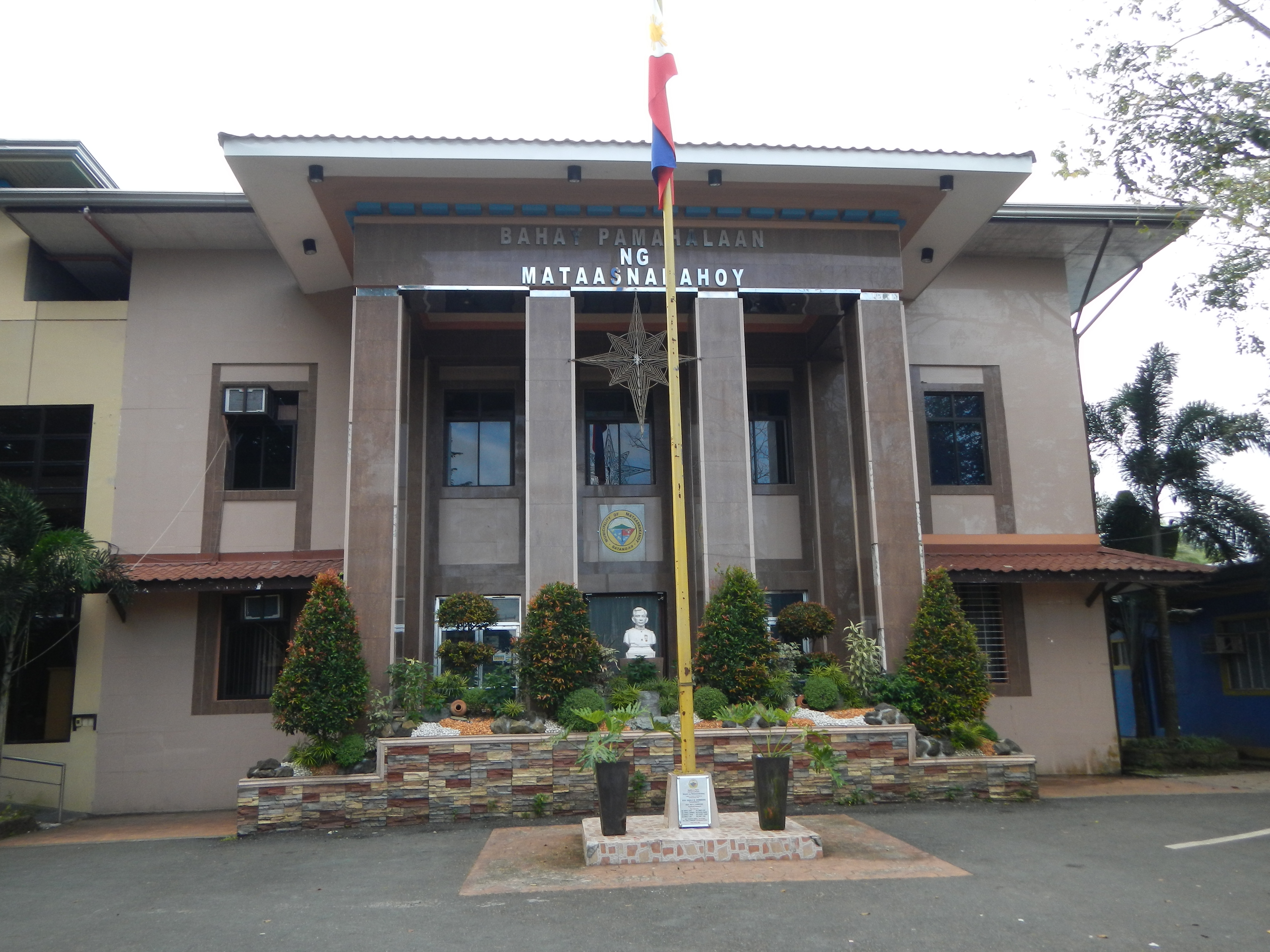
Municipal hall, 2013

=== Elected officials ===
Municipal council (2025-2028):

- Mayor: Lucia Ellery L. Gardiola-Silva
- Vice Mayor: Earel Benedicto L. Gardiola
- Councilors:
  - Ferdinand L. Dimaano
  - Julie Ann G. Silva
  - Carmelita V. Acerimo
  - Antonio L. Bathan
  - Jorgen M. Landicho
  - Mark Gerico R. Sandoval
  - Arnel M. Benedicto
  - Montano S. Dimaculangan

=== List of mayors ===
- Antonio Mandigma - 1932–1933
- Candido O. Recinto - 1933–1934
- Vicente R. Matanguihan - 1935–1939
- Santiago P. Luna - 1939–1945
- Jose Pepito M. Landicho - 1946–1958
- Felino R. Templo - 1959–1962
- Soriano L. Lubis - 1963–1979
- Reynaldo L. Lubis - 1979–1980
- Florencio F. Landicho - 1980–1983
- Isagani S. Laluna - 1983–1986
- Victorino P. Lescano - 1987–1988 (OIC)
- Celso A. Landicho - 1986–1995
- Loreto E. Laqui - 1995–1998
- Arnulfo L. Rivera - 1998–2001
- Loreto E. Laqui - 2001–2002
- Calixto M. Luna, Jr. - 2002–2004
- Danilo M. Sombrano - 2004–2013
- Jay M. Ilagan - 2013–2016
- Gualberto R. Silva - 2016–2019
- Janet M. Ilagan - 2019–2025
- Lucia Ellery L. Gardiola-Silva - 2025-present

== Transportation ==
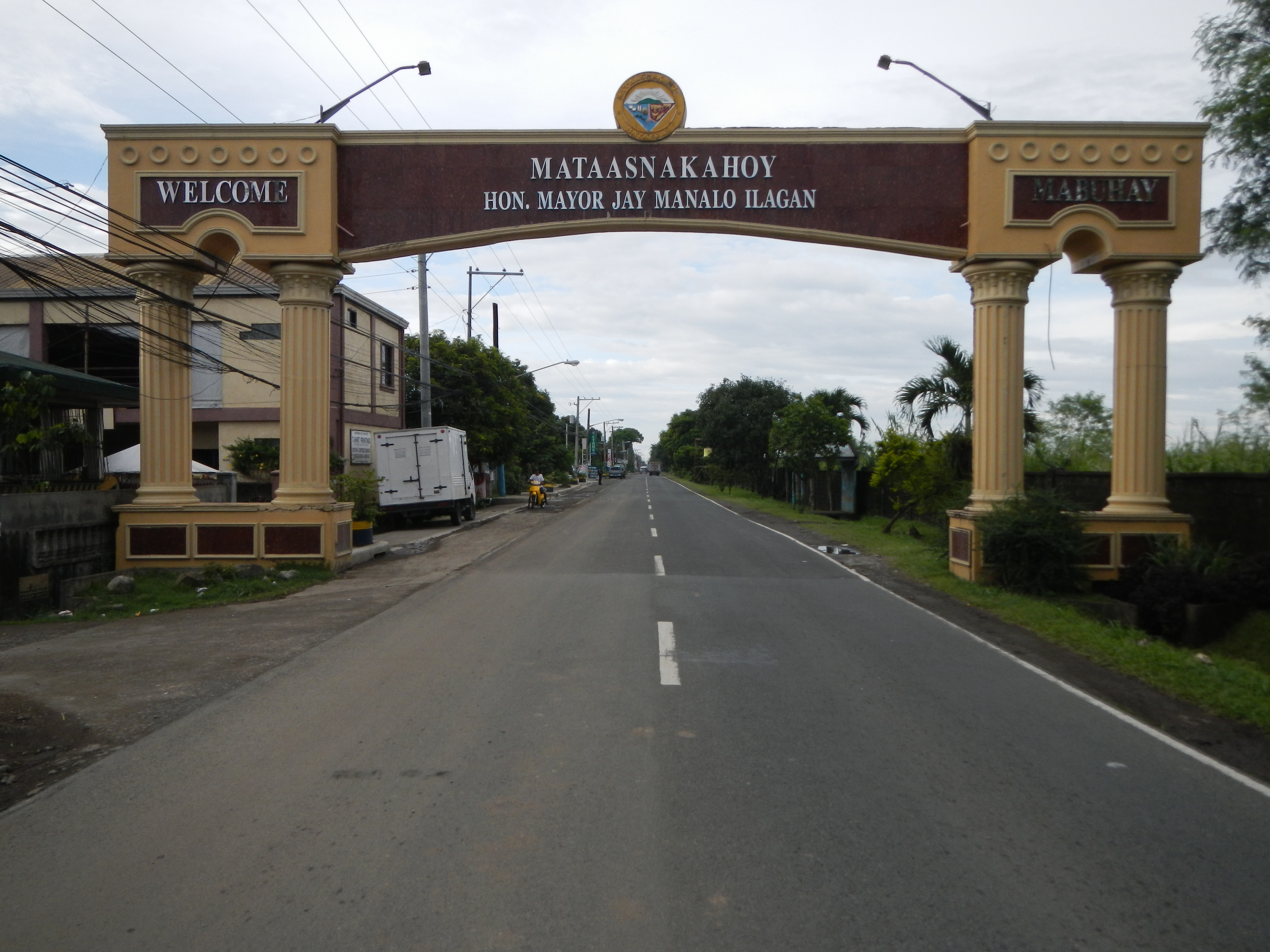
Welcome arch (outdated)

The town is easily accessible via Lipa City though passenger jeepneys plying the route from dawn (3:00 AM) till night (9:00 PM). It is also accessible via the national road through a two-kilometer (1.2 mi) concrete road along the southern boundary of Basilio Fernando Air Base. Tricycles are available for going around town and the innermost barangays.

== Tourism ==
Several resorts operate in different barangays and the town is starting to be known for these resorts. Shercon Resort, the first one which ventured in this line of business, is located in Barangay San Sebastian. Subsequently, El Madero in Barangay II and Galilee Place (Barangay San Sebastian), La Virginia in Barangay Manggahan started operation, Eco Hotel and Honey Bee Farm at Barangay Bayorbor before the arc of Barangay Nangkaan.

=== Fiesta and religious celebrations ===
Mataasnakahoy celebrates its town fiesta every January 3. The series of activities leading to the celebration starts several days before the actual fiesta and this would consist of sporting events, singing contests, street dancing competitions and the likes. The actual feast would be observed with food and alcoholic drinks in almost every household, the celebrations almost an annual reunion for relatives and friends. Marching bands, usually hired or sponsored by barangay officials, add to the music from rented videoke machines in some households. The celebration is usually concluded by a variety show in the town plaza with performers and celebrities, lasting until dawn of the next day.

The town also celebrates various religious feasts with mass and processions. Holy Week is observed solemnly by the townsfolk, with devout families usually sponsoring a pabasa, or ritual chanting of the Pasyón epic narrative centred on Jesus’ passion, death, and resurrection. Several processions are also conducted during Holy Week, with all rituals culminating in Easter Sunday celebrations.

All Saints' Day on November 1 and All Souls' Day on November 2 are observed as in other parts of the country by throngs of people heading to cemeteries to visit ancestral tombs. Flowers, candles, and prayers are offered at the graves by the living relatives who sometimes come even from afar.

The feast of Immaculate Conception of the Blessed Virgin Mary on December 8 celebrates the town's patron saint. A Mass and procession around town with elaborate fireworks are held, with food in the church grounds for devotees.

As is everywhere in the Philippines, the town celebrates the long Christmas season, with decorations hung as early as November 2 and lasting until early January. On Christmas Day, children visit relatives and godparents to ask for blessings, which can also be interpreted as politely requesting for Christmas gifts.

== Education ==
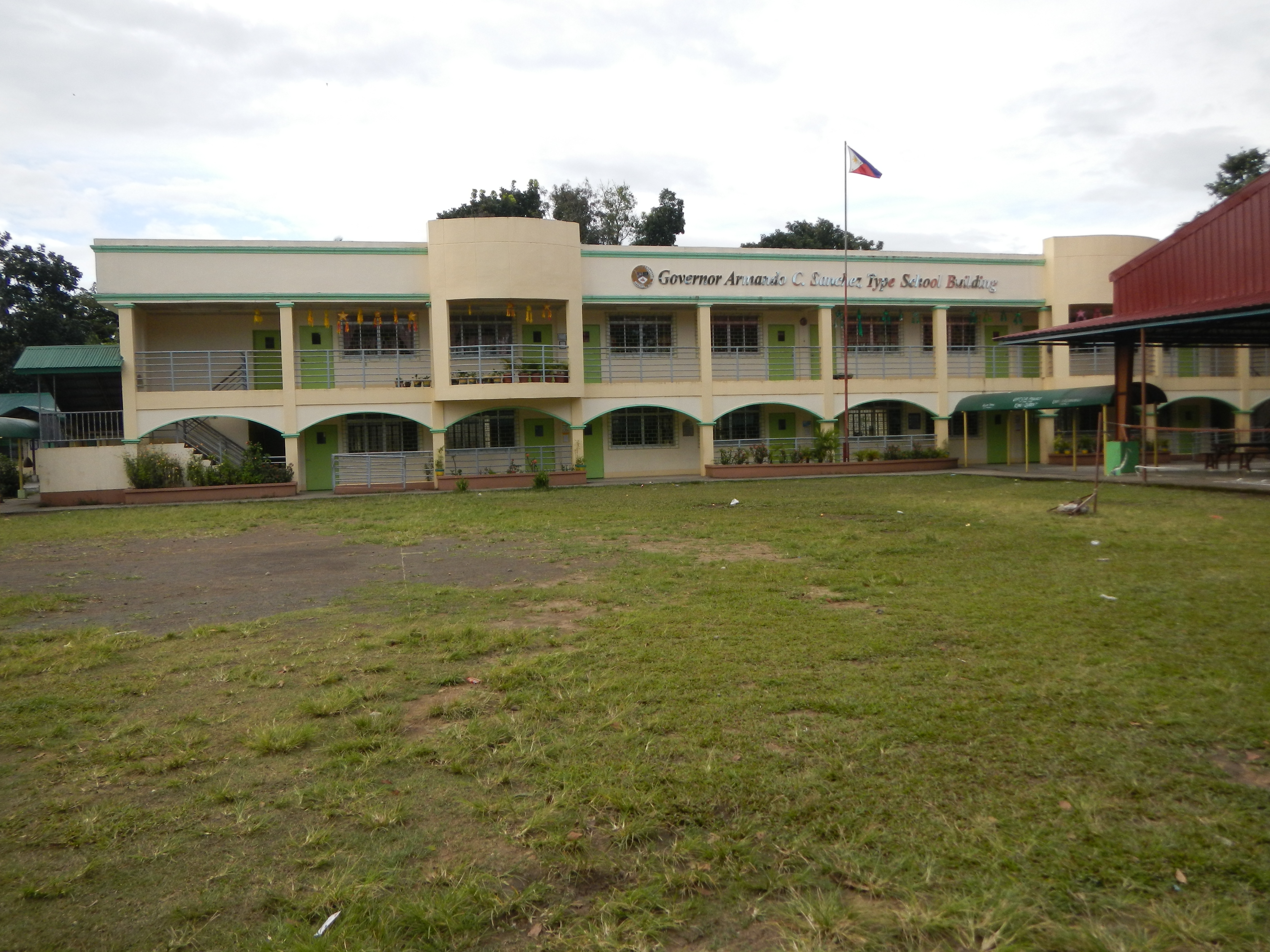
A school building in town

The Mataasnakahoy Schools District Office governs all educational institutions within the municipality. It oversees the management and operations of all private and public, from primary to secondary schools.

The town is home to several secondary schools: La Purisima Concepcion Academy (Barangay II), Holy Trinity School of Padre Garcia, Bats., Mataasnakahoy Branch Inc. (Barangay IV), Mataasnakahoy National High School (Barangay IV), Bayorbor National High School (Bayorbor), Mataasnakahoy Senior High School (Bayorbor) and Mother Chiara Biagiotti School (Santol).

=== Primary and elementary schools ===
- Bubuyan Elementary School
- Holy Trinity School of Padre Garcia
- La Purisima Concepcion Academy
- Mother Chiara Biagiotti School
- Paaralang Elementarya ng Bayorbor
- Paaralang Elementarya ng Calingatan
- Paaralang Elementarya ng Kinalaglagan
- Paaralang Elementarya Ng Loob
- Paaralang Elementarya ng Lumanglipa
- Paaralang Sentral ng Mataasnakahoy
- Paaralang Elementarya ng Nangkaan
- San Sebastian Primary School
- Santol-Manggahan Elementary School
- Timothy Christian Academy Batangas
- Upa Primary School

=== Secondary schools ===
- Bayorbor National High School
- Mataas na Kahoy National High School
- Mataasnakahoy Senior High School

== Notable personalities ==
- Darius Semaña - musician, lead guitarist of the band Parokya ni Edgar
