= Barkada =

Barkada may refer to:

- Barkada (album), a 2014 album by the American rappers Prometheus Brown and Bambu
- "Barkada" (song), a 1999 song by the Filipino alternative rock band Parokya ni Edgar
- Barkada (film), a 1958 film by the Filipino film studio LVN Pictures
