= Pogi Years Old =

Studio album by Parokya ni Edgar
- Released: October 17, 2016
- Recorded: 2011–2015
- Genre: Pinoy rock, OPM
- Label: Universal Records

Parokya ni Edgar chronology
Middle-Aged Juvenile Novelty Pop Rockers (2010)	Pogi Years Old (2016)	Borbolen (2021)

Singles from Pogi Years Old
- 1. "Sing" Released: September 25, 2015; 2. "Lagi Mong Tatandaan" Released: November 15, 2015; 3. "Wala Lang Yun" Released: December 2017; 4. "Friendzone Mong Mukha Mo" Released: January 2018

Pogi Years Old is the tenth studio album by Filipino rock band Parokya ni Edgar. The album was released on October 17, 2016 nationwide and on digital format through Universal Records. Long-time member and backup vocalist Vinci Montaner appears as a featured artist on the album. This marks the first studio album after 6 years since 2010's Middle-Aged Juvenile Novelty Pop Rockers.

== Overview ==
The cover was revealed on September 2, 2016 and it was announced that former member Vinci Montaner would appear on the album as a featured artist. The title was also revealed to be titled Pogi Years Old. On September 9, 2016, the band held a free surprise show at the Bonifacio Shrine in Manila. The band held an album launch at Eastwood Central Plaza on October 16, 2016.

In a press conference held last October 19, 2016, Chito Miranda shared that "Wala Lang Yun" and "Friendzone Mo Mukha Mo" are songs he wrote for his wife Neri Naig.

== Track listing ==
All tracks are written by Parokya ni Edgar, except where noted.

No.	Title	Length
1.	"Friendzone Mo Mukha Mo"	3:14
2.	"Si Aiza, Si Norma, At Si Jen"	5:17
3.	"Sing" (featuring Rico Blanco)	4:33
4.	"Wala Lang Yun"	3:05
5.	"Lagi Mong Tatandaan"	4:23
6.	"OK Katol" (Filler)	0:05
7.	"Kweba ng Ermitanyo"	4:33
8.	"Beautiful Girl" (featuring Vinci Montaner)	3:10
9.	"Chaleco" (Filler)	0:15
10.	"Pan De Monio"	5:16
11.	"Ulan"	3:41
12.	"O Inday (Isang Munting Harana ni Gardo sa Maid ni Mr. Lim)"	5:02
13.	"Ngayong Wala Ka Na"	3:33
14.	"Hamon ng Buhay"	3:59
15.	"Ang Parokya" (featuring Gloc 9 and Frank Magalona)	5:07
16.	"Francis Vincent Montaner Backup Extraordinaire" (Filler)	0:30
17.	"Panahon Na Naman ng Harana" (featuring Rico Blanco)	3:46
18.	"Long Live Loyzaga Bros" (Filler)	0:49
19.	"Tanduay"	1:59
20.	"Nakapunta Ka Na sa America?" (Filler)	0:13
21.	"Salamat Po"	2:59
Total length:		1:05:29

== Personnel ==
Parokya ni Edgar

- Chito Miranda – lead vocals
- Buwi Meneses – bass guitar
- Darius Semaña – lead guitar
- Gab Chee Kee – rhythm guitar, backing vocals
- Dindin Moreno – drums, percussion

Additional musicians

- Vinci Montaner – backup vocals, lead vocals on "Beautiful Girl"
- Rico Blanco – vocals on "Sing" and "Panahon Na Naman ng Harana"
- Frank Magalona, Gloc 9 – rapping on "Ang Parokya"
- Paolo Bernaldo – bass guitar
