= Generika Drugstore =

Philippine pharmacy chain

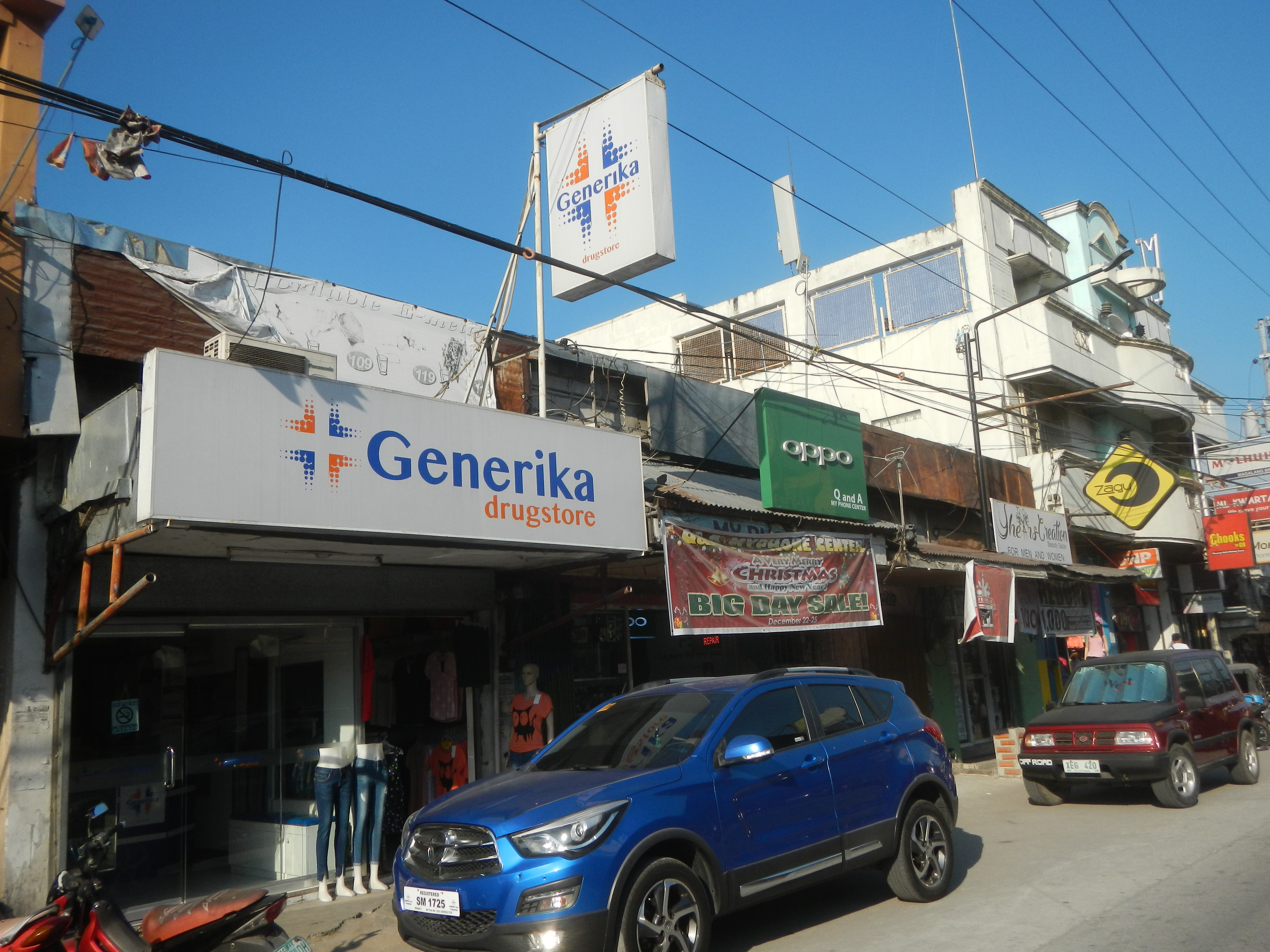
- A branch in Magalang, Pampanga
- Type: Private
- Industry: Retail
- Founded: September 2003
- Founders: Teodoro Ferrer; Julien Belo
- Headquarters: Parañaque, Metro Manila, Philippines
- Number of locations: 700+ stores
- Area served: Philippines
- Owner: Ayala Healthcare Holdings, Inc. Teodoro Ferrer
- Website: www.generika.com.ph

Generika Drugstore is a Philippine pharmacy chain specializing in generic medicines established by Teodoro Ferrer and Julien Belo in 2003.

The company became a part of Ayala Healthcare Holdings, Inc. since 2015.

== History ==
=== Founding and early development ===
Generika Drugstore was co-founded by Teodoro Ferrer and Julien Belo after observing that most Filipinos were unable to complete their medical treatments due to the rising cost of medicines. At the time of its founding, generic medicines were not widely adopted in the Philippines.

Generika positioned itself as a more affordable alternative by offering affordable generic drugs that are generally less costly than their proprietary counterparts. They began with a small apartment office in Goodwill Village in Parañaque.

=== Early expansion (2004) ===
The company grew gradually. In 2004, they opened the first store in Montillano in Muntinlupa.

By 2008, the company had expanded to 16 owned stores and had begun developing its own franchising business model. In 2011, Generika launched nationwide, reaching Visayas and Mindanao. This expansion also included smaller towns and barangays through franchised stores.

=== Ayala acquisition (2015) ===
In 2015, Ayala Healthcare Holdings Inc. acquired a 50 percent stake in Generika Drugstore. The stake was purchased from co-founder Julien Bello's family. While the other 50 percent was retained by Generika's co-founder, Teodoro Ferrer.

In 2019, they acquired an additional stake in the Generika Group, raising their stake to 52.5 percent. This transaction allowed them to raise additional capital for operations and expansion.

By 2023, Generika operates in over 700 outlets across the Philippines.
