= Parokya ni Edgar =

Filipino alternative rock band

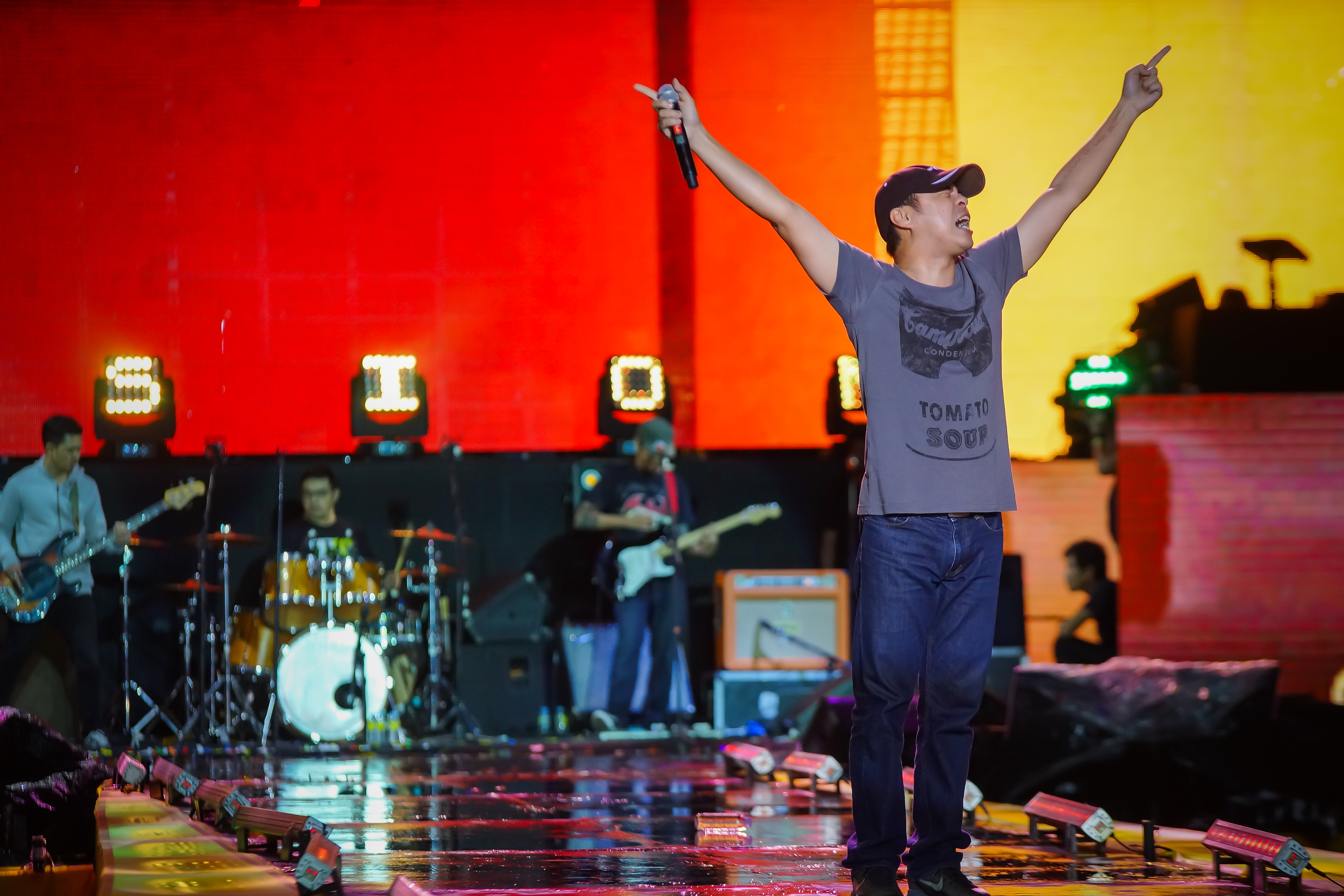
- Parokya ni Edgar at a live performance in 2016

Background information
- Also known as: Comic Relief
- Origin: Quezon City, Philippines
- Genres: Alternative rock; pop rock; comedy rock; experimental; novelty; rap rock; funk rock; Pinoy rock; alternative metal
- Years active: 1993–present
- Label: Universal
- Members: Chito Miranda; Gab Chee Kee; Buwi Meneses; Darius Semaña; Dindin Moreno; Vinci Montaner
- Website: www.parokyaniedgarph.com

Parokya ni Edgar (lit: Edgar's Parish) is a Filipino rock band formed in 1993, composed of Chito Miranda (lead vocals), Gab Chee Kee (rhythm guitar, vocals), Buwi Meneses (bass guitar), Darius Semaña (lead guitar), Dindin Moreno (drums, percussion), and Vinci Montaner (backing vocals). The band is known for its original rock novelty songs and often satirical covers of popular songs both foreign and local. The band is adept at playing in various musical genres.

Parokya ni Edgar has been referred to by local media outlets as "The National Band of the Philippines". As of 2005, the band has reportedly sold 600,000 albums in the Philippines for their first eight albums.

== History ==
=== Formation and early years ===
Originally named Comic Relief, the band's initial members were a group of high school students composed of vocalists Chito Miranda, Jeric Estaco, and Vinci Montaner, along with guitarists Mikko Yap and Gab Chee Kee, all hailing from Ateneo de Manila University. They were regulars in after-school jam sessions, before performing an opening number for an Eraserheads concert. This served as their break in the music industry and prompted them to add a drummer and bassist – Ateneo schoolmate Dindin Moreno and Miranda's childhood friend Buwi Meneses, respectively. Around the same time they changed the band's name to Parokya ni Edgar. After high school, Mikko and Jeric withdrew from the band to pursue other interests. Soon after, the remaining band members invited Darius Semaña, Meneses's former bandmate, to take the role of lead guitar.

=== Career ===
==== Name origin ====
The band name's origin had been a subject of debate among fans as the band members had never given full confirmation. It was not until 2013 that Chito Miranda officially addressed it through a post on their Facebook page. The title "Parokya Ni Edgar" came from a joke a classmate named Bambi Cuna made during one of their high school classes. Sources state that the class subject was Filipino. When the teacher asked Cuna where Jose Rizal's fictional hero, Crisostomo Ibarra (in the novel Noli Me Tangere) was educated, it was said that Cuna made up a daft answer, "sa Parokya ni Edgar". Then-vocalist Jeric Estaco decided on impromptu to introduce the band as "Parokya ni Edgar" in their first live performance. From there, the band name just stuck.

==== Mainstream ====
The band's initial recordings, "Buloy", "Trip (Siopao Na Special)" and "Lutong Bahay (Cooking Ng Ina Mo)", gained radio airplay. Their first album, Khangkhungkherrnitz (1996) became a triple platinum hit in the Philippines, having sold 120,000 units. The next albums were equal successes - Buruguduystunstugudunstuy (1997) was awarded triple platinum, Jingle Balls Silent Night Holy Cow (1998) with gold, and Gulong Itlog Gulong (1999) with triple platinum. This included the single "Halaga", one of the most popular songs of the band. "Halaga" was such a hit in the country that it further boosted PNE's career, cementing their name in the OPM scene.

In 1999, 2 years after Eraserheads won as Best Southeast Asian Music Video Award Winner for "Ang Huling El Bimbo" in 1997, Parokya won as Best Southeast Asian Music Video Award Moon Man Winner for the music video "Harana" in the MTV Music Video Music Awards 1999 which was held in New York City.

After a four-year hiatus, they released their studio album Edgar Edgar Musikahan in 2002.

=== Millennium success: 2003-2009 ===
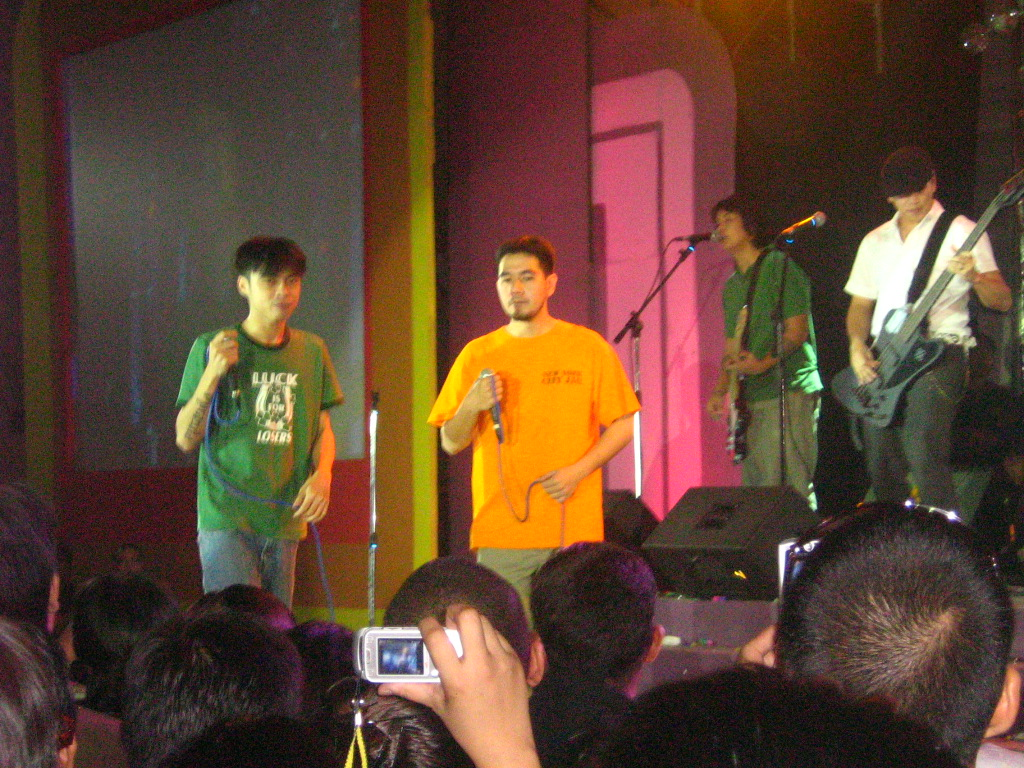
Parokya ni Edgar in 2007

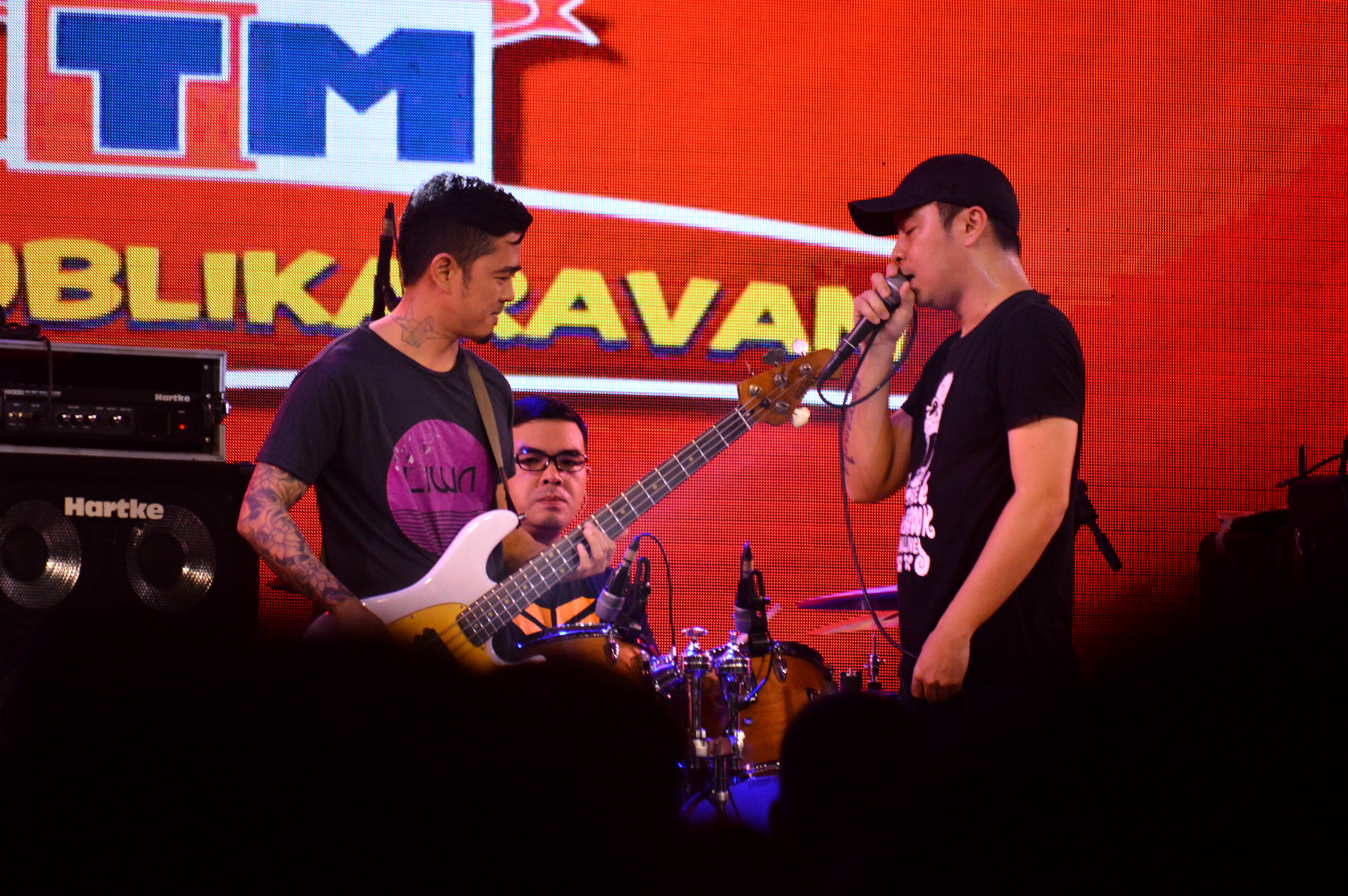
Parokya ni Edgar in 2016

All throughout 2015, the band toured selected cities in the United States; they headlined at the Landmark Loews Theater in Jersey City, New Jersey on March 21, 2015. That same year, the band began recording for their next album and contained the tracks "Sing" and "Lagi Mong Tatandaan", the former featuring Rico Blanco. Their 9th studio album and their 14th overall album is entitled Pogi Years Old. The cover album was revealed on September 2, 2016 through their Facebook page and expected to be released by 2016. Former member Vinci Montaner was said to appear on the album as a featured artist. On September 9, 2016, the band held a free surprise show at the Bonifacio Shrine in Manila. The album was released on October 17, 2016 nationwide and on digital format. The band held an album launch at Eastwood Central Plaza on October 16, 2016, marking the return of Vinci Montaner, who would join permanently days later.

On November 22, 2017, Parokya was named as the newest celebrity music star inductee in the 2017 Eastwood City Walk of Fame in Eastwood City Mall Quezon City for their influence in Pinoy rock music. Parokya was the third related music group and first OPM rock band to be inducted to the Eastwood City Walk Of Fame.

=== Current: 2020-present ===
As of 2020, Parokya is still active with more gigs and is scheduled to release their new single together with the band Kamikazee.

== Activism ==
Parokya joined PETA's Free Mali campaign in 2013. "Mali has been sentenced to a miserable life of solitary confinement with absolutely nothing to do day after day, year after year", says lead vocalist Chito Miranda. Scientists, politicians, religious leaders, and tens of thousands of other concerned people have joined PETA in calling for Mali to be freed. "We in Parokya ni Edgar do, too. Even if the elephant exhibit at the Manila Zoo were to be doubled or tripled in size, it would still not be adequate to house one elephant, never mind additional ones. While zoos around the world have spent upwards of 2 billion pesos on attempts at more appropriately sized elephant exhibits, more and more zoos have recognized that the needs of these complex and intelligent animals cannot be met in captivity".

== Band members ==
Current members

- Chito Miranda – lead vocals (1993–present)
- Gab Chee Kee – rhythm guitar, vocals (1993–present)
- Buwi Meneses – bass guitar, occasional backing vocals (1993–present; intermittent touring since 2015) (Note: — in 2015, Meneses and his family relocated to the United States and now resides there. Although, he is still listed as an official member of the band, he occasionally plays during world tours, vacation to the Philippines, and other gigs. Paolo Bernaldo formerly of Moonstar88 fills-in for in him on bass duties.)
- Darius Semaña – lead guitar (1993–present)
- Dindin Moreno – drums, percussion (1993–present)
- Vinci Montaner – backing vocals, monologue, spoken word, vocal ad-libs, occasional percussion (1993–2005, 2007–2012, 2016–present; one-off appearance in 2013; intermittent touring since 2019) (Note: — Montaner had announced his departure on October 14, 2012, through the band's official page on Facebook citing personal reasons. This marked the second time that Montaner left the group. Montaner temporarily left the band to attend school in 2005 and later rejoined them in the making of their album, "Solid", released in 2007. Montaner briefly reunited with the band in 2013 in a one night only appearance during the launching date of PNE's 13th album "Bente" and back again as featured back up vocals in PNE's 10th studio album (14th overall) "Pogi Years Old" which was released in 2016. He officially returned on the same year. His live appearances with band become semi-regular, however he is still a member of the band.)

Touring and session members

- Paolo Bernaldo (of Moonstar88) – bass guitar (2015–present; touring substitute for Meneses)
- Andrew Panaligan (of iktus) – acoustic guitar, backing vocals (2022–present)

Timeline

== Discography ==
=== Albums ===
==== Studio albums ====
- Khangkhungkherrnitz (1996)
- Buruguduystunstugudunstuy (1997)
- Gulong Itlog Gulong (1999)
- Edgar, Edgar Musikahan (2002)
- Bigotilyo (2003)
- Halina Sa Parokya (2005)
- Solid (2007)
- Middle-Aged Juvenile Novelty Pop Rockers (2010)
- Pogi Years Old (2016)
- Borbolen (2021)

==== Christmas albums ====
- Jingle Balls Silent Night Holy Cow (1998)

==== Compilation albums ====
- Matira Matibay: PG-13 (Singles 1994-2007) (2007)
- Bente (2013)

==== Live albums ====
- Inuman Sessions Vol. 1 (2004)
- Inuman Sessions Vol. 2 (2012)

=== DVDs ===
- Inuman Sessions VOL.1 DVD (2004)
- Matira Matibay: PG-13 ("Singles 1994-2007") DVD (2007)
- Inuman Sessions VOL.2 DVD (2012)
- Bente: Parokya Ni Edgar 20th Anniversary DVD (2013)

=== Collaborative album appearances ===
- Akustic Natin (Universal Records, 2004)
- Akustic Natin Vol. 2 (Universal Records, 2004)
- The Best of OPM Acoustic Hits (Universal Records, 2005)
- The Best of OPM Love Ballads (Universal Records, 2005)
- Pinoy Ako (Star Music, 2005)
- OPM Superstars Christmas (Universal Records, 2005)
- Superbands (Universal Records, 2005)
- Kami nAPO Muna (Universal Records, 2006)
- OPM Gold Christmas Album (Universal Records, 2006)
- The Biggest OPM Hits of The Year SUPER (Universal Records, 2006)
- Bandang Pinoy, Lasang Hotdog (Musiko/Sony BMG Music Philippines, Repackaged 2006)
- Kami nAPO Muna Ulit (Universal Records, 2007)
- Pinoy Biggie Hits Rewind (Star Music, 2007)
- Level Up: The Album (Star Music, 2007)
- OPM Platinum Christmas (Universal Records, 2007)
- Another Biggest OPM Hits of The Year SUPER 2 (Universal Records, 2007)
- Pinoy Biggie Hits Vol. 3 (Star Music, 2007)
- Astig...The Biggest Band Hits (Universal Records, 2008)
- Harana: OPM's Biggest Hits In Guitar (Ivory Music, 2009)
- I-Star 15: The Best Of Alternative & Rock Songs (Star Music, 2010)
- OPM All Star Christmas (Universal Records, 2010)
- A Perfectly Acoustic Experience (PolyEast Records, 2011)
- Awit Kapuso: Kay Sarap Maging Kapuso (GMA Music, 2012)
- Super Astig Hits (Universal Records, 2016)

=== Singles ===
- 1996: "Buloy"
- 1996: "Lutong Bahay (Cooking ng Ina Mo)"
- 1996: "Tatlong Araw"
- 1996: "Maniwala Ka Sana"
- 1997: "Silvertoes"
- 1997: "Sayang"
- 1997: "Harana" (composed by Eric Yaptangco and originally sung by former Smokey Mountain singer and incumbent Finance Undersecretary Tony Lambino; also PNE's 1st cover song and was also covered by APO Hiking Society in 2001)
- 1997: "Sampip" (Parokya's 1st English Rock Song)
- 1999: "Picha Pie"
- 1999: "Halaga"
- 1999: "Inuman Na"
- 1999: "Oka Tokat" (theme song for the TV series of the same title)
- 1999: "Wag Mo Na Sana" (originally composed and performed by Frasco as "Oo Na Mahal Na Kung Mahal Kita")
- 2002: "Swimming Beach"
- 2002: "Sorry Na"
- 2002: "This Guy's in Love with You Pare" (a song of Himig Handog 2002)
- 2002: "Beh! Buti Nga!" (cover of the Hotdog song)
- 2003: "Mr. Suave"
- 2003: "The Yes Yes Show"
- 2003: "Alumni Homecoming"
- 2004: "Chikinini"
- 2004: "Your Song (My One and Only You)"
- 2005: "Kaleidoscope World" (cover of the Francis Magalona song, also featuring Magalona)
- 2005: "First Day Funk" (commercial ad jingle for Rexona)
- 2005: "Mang Jose"
- 2005: "Bagsakan" (featuring Francis M and Gloc-9)
- 2005: "Para Sa 'Yo"
- 2005: "Papa Cologne"
- 2005: "The Ordertaker"
- 2005: "Gitara"
- 2006: "Pumapatak ang Ulan" (cover of the APO Hiking Society song)
- 2007: "American Junk" (featuring Kamikazee) (cover of the APO Hiking Society song)
- 2007: "Nescafé" (commercial ad jingle for Nescafé)
- 2007: "Macho"
- 2007: "Boys Do Falling Love" (cover of the Robin Gibb song)
- 2007: "Lastikman (Walang Susuko)" (theme song for the TV series of the same title)
- 2008: "Akala"
- 2008: "Reunion" (an alternate version was used as a commercial ad jingle for Jollibee with the title "Iisang Sarap")
- 2010: "I-Bulsarap!" (commercial ad jingle for Mang Tomas All-Around Sarsa)
- 2010: "Panday Kids" (theme song for the TV series of the same title)
- 2010: "Pakiusap Lang (Lasingin Nyo Ako)"
- 2012: "Pangarap Lang Kita" (featuring Happee Sy)
- 2013: "One Hit Combo" (featuring Gloc-9)
- 2013: "Ang Parokya" (featuring Gloc-9)
- 2014: "Salamat Po"
- 2015: "Sing" (featuring Rico Blanco)
- 2015: "Lagi Mong Tatandaan"
- 2016: "Beautiful Girl" (cover of the Jose Mari Chan song)
- 2017: "Wala Lang Yun"
- 2018: "Friendzone Mo Mukha Mo"
- 2020: "Pati Pato" (featuring Gloc-9 & Shanti Dope)
- 2020: "Smile"
- 2021: "It's Masarap"
- 2021: "Borbolen"
- 2022: "Rosas"
- 2022: "Wag Ka Na"
- 2022: "Until Now" (feat. Eunice Jorge of Gracenote)
- 2026: San Ka Na (feat. Moira) - brand new single

=== Parodies and samples ===
Parokya ni Edgar is also known for parodying songs of famous singers and bands.

- "Trip" - "Creep" by Radiohead
- "Alimango" - "Animal" by Pearl Jam
- "The Crush (Bakit Ang Pangit Pangit Mo?)" - "Should I Stay or Should I Go" by The Clash
- "Papa Cologne" - interpolates "Lança Perfume" by Rita Lee
- "Picha Pie" - "I Will Survive" by Cake (originally by Gloria Gaynor)
- "Chikinini" - "Banal Na Aso, Santong Kabayo" by Yano
- "Nakaw ang Wallet Ko" - "Knockin' on Heaven's Door" by Guns N' Roses (originally by Bob Dylan)
- "The Ordertaker" - a mashup of "Chop Suey!" and "Toxicity" by System of a Down
- "Macho" - "Macho Man" by Village People
- "Tange" - "The Popeye Theme"
- "Celfone Wallet" / "Celfone Celfone Wallet" - from the "Seiko Wallet Jingle" by Bing Rodrigo
- "Pedro, Basura Man" - "The Popeye Theme"
- "Bagsakan" - interpolates "Pollux Diving" by Keltscross and the Contra theme song from Base I (Stage 2) and II (Stage 4)
- "Mang Jose" - Interpolates the lyrics of the opening theme for Daimos and even referenced the mecha anime in its lyrics.
- "Laging Mong Tatandaan" - interpolates "Pusong Bato" by Aimee Torres
- "It's Masarap" - interpolates "Eat Bulaga"
- "Wag Ka Na" - interpolates "Disney's Camp Rock 2"

=== Music videos ===
- Buloy (1996, debut music video)
- Maniwala Ka Sana (1996)
- Silvertoes (1997)
- Harana (1998, 1st Music Video in 16mm & won 2 years later as Best Southeast Asia Music Video in MTV Video Music Awards in New York City in 1999)
- Halaga (1999, parody dance from Backstreet Boys & Blink-182)
- Picha Pie (1999, spoofs Ace Ventura & Tekken 3)
- Inuman Na (1999)
- Swimming Beach (2002, inspired from Survivor reality TV series)
- Sorry Na (2002, inspired from Jane Fonda Aerobics Video)
- This Guy Is In Love With You Pare (2002, a song finalist in Himig Handog P-Pop Love Songs 2002)
- Chikinini (2003)
- Mr. Suave (2003, theme song from a comedy movie of the same title)
- The Yes Yes Show (2003, inspired from a Hip-Hop Music Video)
- First Day Funk (2005, inspired from Rexona)
- Mang Jose (2005, inspired from Batman)
- Para Sa Yo (2005, inspired from PBB Season 1)
- The Ordertaker (2005, parodied from WWE's The Undertaker)
- Papa Cologne (2005, inspired from an AXE Deo Cologne and spoofs Player's Cologne for men ad from 1991)
- Gitara (2005, inspired from a Koreanovela)
- Bagsakan (2006, inspired from a High School theater)
- Macho (2007, inspired from Village People)
- Akala (2007)
- Pakiusap Lang (2010)
- Pangarap Lang Kita (2010, 1st music video in HD)
- One Hit Combo (2010)
- Ang Parokya (2013, inspired from Nirvana's "You Know You're Right")
- Salamat Po (2013, Parody Of a romance drama movie, "Broke back Mountain" )
- Sing (2016)
- Lagi Mong Tatandaan (2016)
- Wala Lang Yun (2018, inspired from a big heads effects & also 1st aired on MYX)
- Friendzone Mo Mukha Mo (2020, Tower Sessions S04E17.1)
- Pati Pato (2020, inspired from an American Rock Band Linkin Park)
- It's Masarap (2021, inspired from a long running noontime show "Eat Bulaga")
- Rosas (2022, 2nd music video in HD)
- Wag Ka Na (2022, parody of Disney's Camp Rock 2's This Is Our Song)
- Until Now "feat. Eunice Jorge of Gracenote" (2022, inspired from MTV Unplugged)

== Awards and nominations ==
Year	Award giving body	Category	Nominated work	Results
1996	Awit Awards	Album of the Year	Khangkhungkherrnitz	Nominated
1996	Awit Awards	Best New Group	—N/a	Nominated
1996	Awit Awards	Best Rock Performance	—N/a	Nominated
1996	Awit Awards	Music Video of the Year	"Buloy"	Nominated
1996	DWLS FM	New OPM Artist of The Year	—N/a	Won
1996	NU Rock Awards	Best New Artist	—N/a	Won
1996	NU Rock Awards	Best Live Act	—N/a	Won
1998	NU Rock Awards	Song of the Year	"Don't Touch My Birdie"	Won
1998	NU Rock Awards	Best Album Packaging	Buruguduystunstugudunstuy	Won
1999	Awit Awards	Best Novelty Recording	"Don't Touch My Birdie"	Won
1999	Awit Awards	Best TV Theme Song	"!Oka Tokat"	Won
1999	MTV Music Awards	International Viewer's Choice Award for MTV Southeast Asia	"Harana"	Won
1999	NU Rock Awards	Artist of the Year	—N/a"	Won
1999	NU Rock Awards	Bassist of the Year	(for Buwi Meneses)	Won
2000	Awit Awards	Best Alternative Recording	"Inuman na"	Won
2000	Guillermo Memorial Foundation	Best Group	—N/a	Won
2000	NU Rock Awards	Artist of the Year	—N/a"	Won
2001	MTV Pilipinas	Favorite Group Video	"Inuman Na"	Won
2002	MTV Pilipinas	Favorite Song	"Swimming Beach"	Won
2002	NU Rock Awards	Best Album Packaging	Edgar Edgar Musikahan	Won
2002	NU Rock Awards	Artist of The Year	—N/a	Nominated
2003	Awit Awards	Best Album Package	Edgar Edgar Musikahan	Won
2003	Awit Awards	Best Novelty Recording	"This Guy's In Love With You Pare"	Won
2003	NU Rock Awards	Artist of the Year	—N/a	Won
2004	Awit Awards	Best Performance By a Duo or Group Recording Artist	"Mr. Suave"	Won
2004	Awit Awards	Record of the Year	"Mr. Suave"	Won
2004	Awit Awards	Music Video Performance	"Mr. Suave"	Won
2004	Awit Awards	Best Novelty Recording	"Mr. Suave"	Won
2004	Awit Awards	Best Rap Recording	"The Yes Yes Show"	Won
2004	Awit Awards	Best Rap Recording	"Bagsakan"	Nominated
2004	MTV Asia Awards	Favorite Artist Philippines	—N/a	Won
2005	Awit Awards	Album of the Year	"Halina sa Parokya"	Nominated
2005	MTV Pilipinas	MTV Ayos! Award for Best Dance Sequence	"First Day Funk"	Won
2005	NU Rock Awards	Bassist of the Year	(for Buwi Meneses)	Nominated
2005	NU Rock Awards	Best Live Act	—N/a	Nominated
2005	NU Rock Awards	Song of the Year	"Mang Jose"	Nominated
2005	NU Rock Awards	Artist of the Year	—N/a	Nominated
2006	Awit Awards	Best Selling Album of the Year	"Halina sa Parokya"	Nominated
2006	Awit Awards	Best Novelty Recording	"Mang Jose"	Nominated
2006	Awit Awards	Best Dance Recording	"First Day Funk"	Nominated
2006	Awit Awards	Music Video of the Year	"Mang Jose"	Nominated
2006	MYX Music Awards	Favorite Music Video	"Mang Jose"	Nominated
2006	MYX Music Awards	Favorite Rock Video	"Mang Jose"	Nominated
2006	MYX Music Awards	Favorite MYX Live Performance	—N/a	Nominated
2006	MYX Music Awards	Favorite Media Soundtrack	"First Day Funk"	Nominated
2007	ASAP Pop Viewers Choice Awards	Best Pop Band	—N/a	Nominated
2007	MYX Music Awards	Favorite Rock Video	"The Ordertaker" with Kamikazee	Nominated
2007	MYX Music Awards	Favorite Collaboration	"The Ordertaker" with Kamikazee	Nominated
2008	ASAP Pop Viewers Choice Awards	Best Pop Band	—N/a	Nominated
2008	Awit Awards	Best Soundtrack	"Walang Susuko" from Lastikman	Nominated
2008	Awit Awards	Album of the Year	Solid	Nominated
2008	Awit Awards	Best Ballad Recording	"Iisa Lang"	Nominated
2008	MYX Music Awards	Favorite MYX Celebrity VJ	—N/a	Nominated
2008	1st Nickelodeon Philippines Kids Choice Awards	Favorite Musical Act	—N/a	Nominated
2008	SOP PasiklaBAND Awards	Best Rock Band	—N/a	Nominated
2008	SOP PasiklaBAND Awards	Best Song Revival	"Boys Do Fall In Love"	Nominated
2008	SOP PasiklaBAND Awards	Favorite Vocalist	(for Chito Miranda)	Nominated
2008	SOP PasiklaBAND Awards	Best Favorite Band of The Year	—N/a	Nominated
2009	MYX Music Awards	Favorite Remake	"Macho"	Nominated
2009	Philippine Radio Music Award	Best Alternative Group	—N/a	Won
2011	Awit Awards	Best Ballad Recording	"Pangarap Lang Kita"(Feat. Happy Sy)	Won
2011	Awit Awards	Best Collaboration	"Pangarap Lang Kita"(Feat. Happy Sy)	Won
2011	Awit Awards	Best Performance by a Group	"Paki-usap Lang"	Won
2011	Awit Awards	Best Song of the Year	"Paki-usap Lang"	Won
2011	Guillermo Memorial Foundation	Most Popular Recording/Performing Group	—N/a	Won
2011	MYX Music Awards	Favorite Group	—N/a	Won
2011	MYX Music Awards	Favorite Song	"Pakiusap Lang (Lasingin Nyo Ako)"	Nominated
2011	MYX Music Awards	Favorite MYX Celebrity VJ	—N/a	Nominated
2011	MYX Music Awards	Favorite Artist	—N/a	Nominated
2012	Guillermo Memorial Foundation	Most Popular Recording/Performing Group	—N/a	Won
2012	MYX Music Awards	Favorite MYX Live! Performance	—N/a	Won
2012	MYX Music Awards	Favorite Guest Appearance in a Music Video	for JM de Guzman "Pangarap Lang Kita"	Won
2012	MYX Music Awards	Favorite Collaboration	"One Hit Combo" (feat. Gloc9)	Won
2012	MYX Music Awards	Favorite Artist	—N/a	Won
2012	MYX Music Awards	Favorite Song	"Pangarap Lang Kita"(feat. Happee Sy)	Won
2012	MYX Music Awards	Favorite Group	—N/a	Won
2012	Yahoo! Philippines OMG Awards	Band Of The Year	—N/a	Won
2014	M.O.R. 101.9 Music Award	M.O.R. Rock Icon Award	—N/a	Won
2014	MYX Music Awards	MYX Magna Award	—N/a	Won
2014	MYX Music Awards	Favorite Group	—N/a	Won
2014	Yahoo! Philippines OMG Awards	Band Of The Year	—N/a	Won
2017	Eastwood City Walk Of Fame	Celebrity Music Category Star Inductee	—N/a	Won

== Other projects ==
Parokya ni Edgar band vocalist member Chito Miranda is also an occasional movie actor, starring in his debut movie appearance "Coming Soon" which was released in 2013. Miranda is also an occasional solo artist, having collaborations with Abra, Gloc-9, Maysh Baay of Moonstar88,Sponge Cola in song called "XGF", former Rivermaya frontman Rico Blanco, and Eunice Jorge of Gracenote. Parokya also had collaborations with Francis M and with Eraserheads frontman Ely Buendia for the single "Hosanna Ngayong Pasko" as part of the band's Christmas album, "Jingle Balls Silent Night Holy Cow" which was released in 1998. Miranda is also a T-shirt brand ambassador endorser of Uniqlo Philippines in 2012 together with former singer-actress Nikki Gil-Albert and other actors and sports personalities. Miranda was also their first solo T-shirt endorser. Miranda has recently endorsed, with wife Neri and his Miggy, for a Bonakid Kids Milk Commercial in 2021. Chito is now also a celebrity bank endorser of an oldest bank in Southeast Asia, Bank of the Philippine Islands Chito is now the recent newest judge in a brand new season of Idol Philippines replacing original judge James Reid and comedian Vice Ganda now replaces Gary V. as the newest judge while original Idol PH judges Asia's songbird TV host and actress Regine Velasquez-Alcasid and commercial jingle singer and TV host Moira Dela Torre will return again also in a recent new season in 2022. Chito is also dueted for the first time with his fellow Idol Philippines Judge and also his new best friend Moira Dela Torre for the song San Ka Na (Which also originally sang by Moira Dela Torre) with Chitos Band version of Parokya Ni Edgar in 2026.

Parokya's backing vocalist Vinci Montaner is also a solo artist and also worked with Pinoy hip hop artist Gloc-9 in 2019. Monataner also covered Jose Mari Chan's iconic signature song, "Beautiful Girl", which was his all-time favorite love song. This cover single becomes a rock ballad cover song and was also part of Parokya's 14th overall album, "Pogi Years Old" released in 2016.

Buwi Meneses is also a commercial endorser for "RJ Guitars" which he had his first solo commercial, playing bass. Meneses is also a former member of the band Franco in 2010, with Franco Reyes. Buwi is also venture into acting aside from playing bass guitar as he also joined as a former contestant of a filipino adaptation of Survivor Philippines Celebrity Doubles Showdown and was formerly Aired on GMA Channel 7 in 2010, but he was lost to Japanese model & actor Akihiro Sato.

Paolo Bernaldo is the band's regular touring and session bassist filling in for long time bassist Buwi Meneses who is currently residing in the US. Meneses still plays in the band in US tours and occasional visits in the Philippines. Bernaldo is also a former member of the band Moonstar88 along with Maysh Baay who also had a duet with Parokya lead singer Chito Miranda.

Andrew Panaligan is now currently the recent newest band member Parokya replaced from long time back up singer Vinci "Vinch" Montaner who is now currently migrated and also residing in California, Montaner is also part of the band where he still sings in mostly U.S. & Canada Tours and he also occasionally visits the Philippines. Panaligan is a former band member of "Iktus".

== Notes ==
Awards
Preceded by Put3ska	NU Rock Awards; Best New Artist; 1996	Succeeded by P.O.T.
