= Middle-Aged Juvenile Novelty Pop Rockers =

Studio album by Parokya ni Edgar
- Released: September 30, 2010
- Genre: Alternative rock, novelty
- Label: Universal Records
- Producer: Robert Javier

Parokya ni Edgar chronology
Solid (2007)	Middle-Aged Juvenile Novelty Pop Rockers (2010)	Pogi Years Old (2016)

Middle-Aged Juvenile Novelty Pop Rockers is the ninth studio album of the Filipino alternative rock band Parokya ni Edgar, released in 2010 by Universal Records. This was Vinci Montaner's final album as a permanent member; he left the band in October 2012 but eventually returned following the release of Pogi Years Old in October 2016.

The album's title and artwork is a parody of the comic book and cartoon series Teenage Mutant Ninja Turtles.

== Track listing ==
All lyrics are written by Chito Miranda; all music is composed by Parokya ni Edgar.

No.	Title	Length
1.	"Original Song"	2:17
2.	"Ganito O!" (Filler)	0:08
3.	"Reunion (Panahon Ng Kasiyahan)"	3:14
4.	"Orange"	2:52
5.	"Pangarap Lang Kita" (ft. Happee Sy)	3:15
6.	"OK Katol!" (Filler)	0:06
7.	"Pakiusap Lang (Lasingin Nyo Ako)"	3:11
8.	"Francis Vincent Montaner" (Filler)	0:24
9.	"Red Pants"	4:00
10.	"Yakult"	0:12
11.	"Walong Baso"	3:09
12.	"One Hit Combo" (ft. Gloc9)	2:50
13.	"Tuloy Po Kayo" (Filler)	0:25
14.	"Lolo Bye"	3:40
15.	"Ok Lang Ako"	3:18
16.	"Pangarap Lang Kita" (ft. Francis Vincent Montaner)	3:28
Total length:		36:08
