= Khangkhungkherrnitz =

Studio album by Parokya Ni Edgar
- Released: 1996
- Recorded: Digital FX
- Genre: Alternative rock, novelty
- Label: Universal Records
- Producer: Robert Javier

Parokya Ni Edgar chronology
Khangkhungkherrnitz (1996)	Buruguduystunstugudunstuy (1997)

Professional ratings
Review scores
Source	Rating
AllMusic	3/5 stars

Khangkhungkherrnitz is the debut studio album by Filipino alternative rock band Parokya ni Edgar, released in 1996 under Universal Records.

== Track listing ==
All lyrics are written by Chito Miranda; all music is composed by Parokya ni Edgar

No.	Title	Length
1.	"Galactic Lady Intro" (Filler)	0:42
2.	"Bato"	1:32
3.	"Pangarap Ko sa Buhay"	2:36
4.	"Nakaw ang Wallet Ko" (Knockin' on Heaven's Door parody)	4:33
5.	"MUHMEE!! Instant Mami Noodles" (Filler)	0:10
6.	"Labsung"	1:00
7.	"Paparap"	1:39
8.	"Buloy Buys Hubbu-Bubbu Chisnax" (Filler)	0:29
9.	"Buloy"	4:13
10.	"Funkydelic Hirit" (Filler)	5:56
11.	"Edgar Orders Pizza" (Filler)	0:24
12.	"Lutong Bahay (Cooking ng Ina Mo)"	2:47
13.	"Trip (Siopao na Special)" (Creep parody)	3:41
14.	"The Crush" (Should I Stay or Should I Go parody)	2:50
15.	"Shamforla Wuffer Stick" (Filler)	0:16
16.	"Maniwala Ka Sana"	3:13
17.	"Tatlong Araw"	2:14
18.	"Outro ni Kuya Kunot" (Filler)	0:23
19.	"Karaoke ni Edgar" (Filler)	6:32
Total length:		44:28

- The name "Charles Manlapato" is also mentioned in their album Bigotilyo. After this filler comes a hidden track but it was considered as part of the filler.

== Notes ==
- Morlock, the dog that was mentioned in "Buloy" is seen on the disc.
