= Edgar Edgar Musikahan =

Studio album by Parokya ni Edgar
- Released: January 31, 2002
- Recorded: Digital FX
- Genre: Alternative rock, novelty
- Label: Universal Records

Parokya ni Edgar chronology
Gulong Itlog Gulong (1999)	Edgar Edgar Musikahan (2002)	Bigotilyo (2003)

Professional ratings
Review scores
Source	Rating
AllMusic	3/5 stars

Edgar Edgar Musikahan (English translation: Edgar Edgar Musical Show) is the fourth studio album and fifth overall album by the Filipino alternative rock band Parokya ni Edgar, released in 2002 by Universal Records.

== Track listing ==
No.	Title	Length
1.	"Intro"	0:16
2.	"Madapaka!"	2:58
3.	"Sige Na Naman"	3:30
4.	"Swimming Beach"	4:25
5.	"Superstar"	5:21
6.	"Pumapatak ang Ulan"	3:07
7.	"Sorry Na"	4:10
8.	"Family Dinner"	3:41
9.	"Chuerva Gold"	0:11
10.	"Nanjan"	4:01
11.	"Tungkol Sa'yo"	6:28
12.	"Y?"	3:30
13.	"Beh Buti Nga"	2:44
14.	"All Right"	2:31
15.	"It's Ok"	4:02
16.	"Wag Kang Mag-alala"	4:21
17.	"This Guy's in Love with You Pare (bonus track)"	3:12
