= Halina Sa Parokya =

Studio album by Parokya ni Edgar
- Released: May 26, 2005
- Genre: Alternative rock; Novelty; Pinoy rock
- Label: Universal Records
- Producer: Robert Javier

Parokya ni Edgar chronology
Bigotilyo (2003)	Halina Sa Parokya (2005)	Solid (2007)

Professional ratings
Review scores
Source	Rating
AllMusic	4/5 stars

Halina Sa Parokya is the sixth studio album and seventh overall album of the Filipino alternative rock band Parokya ni Edgar, released on May 26, 2005 by Universal Records. The album contains the singles "Para Sa 'Yo", "Gitara", "Papa Cologne", "Mang Jose", "Bagsakan feat. Francis Magalona and Gloc-9", "The Ordertaker feat. Kamikazee" and "First Day Funk".

== Track listing ==
No.	Title	Length
1.	"Halina Sa Parokya"	3:11
2.	"Walang Nangyari"	3:49
3.	"Para Sa 'Yo"	4:12
4.	"Gitara"	4:02
5.	"Victor Could"	2:23
6.	"Papa Cologne"	3:17
7.	"Nandito"	4:22
8.	"Mang Jose"	4:06
9.	"Telepono"	5:56
10.	"Kayang Kaya Kaya?"	3:49
11.	"Bagsakan" (ft. Francis Magalona and Gloc-9)	3:27
12.	"The Ordertaker" (ft. Kamikazee)	4:05
13.	"Muli"	4:56
14.	"Name Fun"	2:24
15.	"First Day Funk (Version 1)"	2:34
16.	"Pedro's Basura Mix"	3:38
17.	"First Day Funk (Version 2)"	3:00
Total length:		1:03:21
