= Buruguduystunstugudunstuy =

Studio album by Parokya Ni Edgar
- Released: 1997
- Recorded: Tracks Studios
- Genre: Alternative rock; novelty
- Label: Universal
- Producer: Robert Javier

Parokya Ni Edgar chronology
Khangkhungkherrnitz (1996)	Buruguduystunstugudunstuy (1997)	Gulong Itlog Gulong (1999)

Singles from Buruguduystunstugudunstuy
- 1. "Silvertoes"

Professional ratings
Review scores
Source	Rating
Allmusic	4/5 stars

Buruguduystunstugudunstuy is the second studio album by the Filipino alternative rock band Parokya Ni Edgar, released in 1997 under Universal Records.

== Track listing ==
All tracks are written by Chito Miranda, except where noted.

No.	Title	Writer(s)	Length
1.	"G.L.I"		0:26
2.	"Intro ni Mr. Lambert"		0:29
3.	"High"		2:36
4.	"Alimango"		2:11
5.	"Sayang"		3:00
6.	"Okatokat"		2:44
7.	"It's a Bird"		0:08
8.	"Please Don't Touch My Birdie"		4:43
9.	"Public Service #1"		0:36
10.	"Batangas Coffee"	Darius Semana	3:35
11.	"Sampip"	Chito Miranda, Gabriel Chee Kee	4:06
12.	"Atras Abante"		0:22
13.	"Silvertoes"		3:43
14.	"Public Service #2"		0:18
15.	"Buttsins"	Buhawi Meneses	3:36
16.	"Gudibningpo"		0:15
17.	"Harana"	Eric Yaptangco	3:02
18.	"Pentelpen #8712"		2:03
19.	"Magic Spaceship"		5:42
20.	"Killer Filler"		2:45
21.	"Sampip (Acoustic)(CD Version Only)"	Chito Miranda, Gabriel Chee Kee	4:24
22.	"Sampip (All)(Cassette version only)"	Chito Miranda, Gabriel Chee Kee	2:53

== Album credits ==
- Executive Producer: Bella Tan
- Engineered/Mixed/Digitally Enhanced by: Angee Rozul (with the help of Yordi & Elmer)
- Album Cover Concept and Illustration: Chito Miranda and Ian Sta. Maria
- Art Direction and Lay out: Grahic Axcess, Inc
