= Bigotilyo =

Studio album by Parokya ni Edgar
- Released: July 14, 2003
- Genres: Alternative rock; Pop rock; OPM
- Label: Universal Records
- Producer: Robert Javier

Parokya ni Edgar chronology
Edgar Edgar Musikahan (2002)	Bigotilyo (2003)	Halina Sa Parokya (2005)

Professional ratings
Review scores
Source	Rating
AllMusic	3/5 stars

Bigotilyo is the fifth studio album and sixth overall album of the Filipino alternative rock band Parokya ni Edgar, released in 2003 by Universal Records. The album contains the singles "Chikinini", "Mr. Suave" and "The Yes Yes Show".

== Track listing ==
No.	Title	Length
1.	"Alumni Homecoming"	4:42
2.	"Choco Latte"	3:33
3.	"Iwanan Mo Na Siya"	4:37
4.	"Chikinini"	4:17
5.	"Absorbing Man"	5:09
6.	"Parang Ayoko Na Yata"	5:32
7.	"Hamburglar Skit"	0:34
8.	"Katawan"	1:31
9.	"Taimo Pesticide"	0:38
10.	"Tsaka Na Lang"	4:31
11.	"Mr. Suave"	4:28
12.	"Something in Common, Pt. 1"	0:21
13.	"The Yes Yes Show"	3:57
14.	"Sad Trip"	4:46
15.	"Ted Hannah"	6:20
16.	"Something in Common, Pt. 2"	0:40
17.	"Your Song"	2:49
Total length:		53:28
