= Gulong Itlog Gulong =

Studio album by Parokya ni Edgar
- Released: August 1999
- Recorded: Pink Noise
- Genre: Alternative rock, novelty
- Label: Universal Records
- Producer: Robert Javier

Parokya ni Edgar chronology
Buruguduystunstugudunstuy (1997)	Gulong Itlog Gulong (1999)	Edgar Edgar Musikahan (2002)

Professional ratings
Review scores
Source	Rating
AllMusic	3/5 stars

Gulong Itlog Gulong (English translation: Roll Egg Roll) is the third studio album and fourth overall album of the Filipino alternative rock band Parokya ni Edgar, released in 1999 by Universal Records. The album received Platinum certification from the Philippine Association of the Record Industry, Inc. in September 24, 1999.

== Track listing ==
No.	Title	Length
1.	"(Intro) Magic Time...Minsan"	2:04
2.	"Halaga"	5:52
3.	"Picha Pie (I Will Survive cover ) popularized by Gloria Gaynor"	3:18
4.	"Order Picha Pie"	0:20
5.	"Wag Mo Na Sana"	2:58
6.	"Tanong Mo Kay Papa"	0:25
7.	"Lazy"	3:09
8.	"Shine Sapatos"	0:30
9.	"Gising Na"	3:47
10.	"Yakinikitombo"	1:28
11.	"Cobra Bird"	3:45
12.	"Nagtatanong Ka Na Eh"	0:18
13.	"Inuman Na!"	4:04
14.	"Yakinikitombo...Happy Birthday Toyo"	1:16
15.	"Saan Man Patungo"	4:02
16.	"Victor Would"	5:00
17.	"Pwedeng Makausap Si Girlie?"	0:14
18.	"Kailan Pa"	3:38
19.	"Repair Sapatos"	0:24
20.	"Barkada"	2:40
21.	"Itlog ng Pugo"	0:20
22.	"Moonsong"	3:11
23.	"Mukha ng Pera"	7:55
24.	"Pwedeng Magtanong"	0:15
25.	"Magic Time"	6:36

== Album credits ==
- Executive Producer: Bella Tan
- Recorded at: Pink House Studio by Jun Reyes
- Digitally Mastered at: Tracks Studios by Angee Rozul
- Album Concept by: Parokya ni Edgar
- Design & Art Direction: Graphic Axcess Inc
- Photography by: Allen Villalon Studios

== Awards and nominations ==
Awards and nominations
Year	Award giving body	Category	Nominated work	Results
2000	2000 NU Rock Awards	Album of the Year	Gulong Itlog Gulong	Included
