= Universal Records (Philippines) =

Recording label company in the Philippines

- Parent company: Warner Music Group (1977–1992); Independent (1992–present)
- Founded: 1977 (as WEA Records Philippines)
- Founder: Warner Music Group; Bella Dy Tan
- Status: Active
- Distributor: self-distributed
- Genre: Various
- Country of origin: Philippines
- Location: 9/F, Universal Tower, 1487 Quezon Avenue, West Triangle, Quezon City, Metro Manila, Philippines
- Official website: universalrecords.com.ph

Universal Records Philippines, Inc. is a Philippine record label founded in 1977 as part of Warner Music Group. It has been an independent label since 1992. The label is currently a member of the Philippine Association of the Record Industry.

== History ==
URPI was founded in 1977 as WEA Records Philippines Inc. The company was the licensee of WEA in the Philippines for 15 years. Nevertheless, the company decided to set up its own office, the forerunner of what is now Warner Music Philippines.

in 1992, the company adopted a new name, Universal Records Philippines Inc. and has since risen to become one of the best and biggest record labels in the Philippines.

Universal Records officially distributed K-pop albums beginning in September 2009, followed by several J-pop albums announced in late May 2011.

Currently, it is the leading independent record label in the country and hosts the best-selling OPM artists.

In 2018, the company launched Mustard Music, a sub-label focused on the growth of homegrown indie acts.

== Distributed labels ==
As of 2011 :

=== Local ===
- 12 Stone Inc.
- GMA Music
- Jesuit Communications Foundation
- Jesuit Music Ministry
- Soupstar Music

=== Foreign ===
- (United States) 618 International Records
- (Japan) AI Entertainment
- (United Kingdom) All Around the World Productions
- (United States) American Laundromat Records
- (United Kingdom) Angular Recording Corporation
- (Canada) Arts & Crafts
- (Japan) Avex Group
  - Avex Taiwan
  - (Hong Kong) Avex Asia
    - (Netherlands) Armada Music
    - (Japan) Johnny's Entertainment
    - (Germany) Kontor Records
    - (Japan) / (Singapore) Major Chord Records
    - (South Korea) Purple Communication
    - (South Korea) S.M. Entertainment
    - (Netherlands) Vandit
- (United Kingdom) Beggars Banquet Records
- (United Kingdom) Blanco y Negro Records
- (Sweden) Bonnier Amigo Music Group
- (United States) Brickhouse Direct
- (United Kingdom) Cooking Vinyl
  - (United Kingdom) Take Me to the Hospital
- (United Kingdom) Domino Records
- (Germany) Edel Music
- (Spain) Elefant Records
- (South Korea) FNC Music
- (Japan) Geneon Entertainment (music division)
- (Japan) Imperial Records
- (United Kingdom) Instant Karma
- (Germany) Kitty-Yo
- (Sweden) Labrador Records
- (Australia) Liberation Music
- (Sweden) Licking Fingers
- (South Korea) LOEN Entertainment
  - (South Korea) Stardom Entertainment
- (United Kingdom) LTM Recordings
- (United States) Matador Records
- (United Kingdom) Moshi Moshi Records
- (United States) NeoMONDE Productions
- (South Korea) NH Media
- (Japan) Nippon Columbia
- (United States) Om Records
- (European Union) PIAS
- (Sweden) Playground Music Scandinavia
- (South Korea) Pledis Entertainment
- (Japan) Pony Canyon
  - (Malaysia) Interglobal Music (Pony Canyon MY)
  - (Japan) Leafage
- (United States) Secretly Canadian
- (Sweden) Service
- (Sweden) Sincerely Yours
- (United States) TC Music
- (United States) TVT Records
- (United States) Ultra Records
- (United Kingdom) XL Recordings
- (South Korea) Yejeon Media
- (South Korea) YG Entertainment (until 2012)

== Artists ==
=== Current artists ===
- Will Mikhael (2022–present)
- Angelina Cruz (2016–present)
- Better Days (2017–present)
- Bey Pascua (2021–present)
- Christian Bautista (2009–present)
- David Licauco (2023–present)
- DJ Loonyo (2021–present)
- Donny Pangilinan (2017–present)
- Dotty's World (2018–present)
- Elmo Magalona (2015–present)
- Gary Valenciano (1983–present)
- Gehlee Dangca (2026-present)
- Gloc-9 (2012–present)
- I Belong to the Zoo (2022–present)
- Ice Seguerra (2015–present)
- Imago (band) (2006–2010; 2019–present)
- Janina Vela (2017–present)
- JKris (2018–present)
- Julie Anne San Jose (2017–present)
- Karencitta (2017–present)
- Kemrie Barcenas (2020–present)
- Kurei (2019–present)
- Kyle Juliano (2017–present)
- Mark Oblea (2017–present)
- Maine Mendoza (2017–present)
- Noel Cabangon (2009–present)
- Paolo Mallari (2017–present)
- Paolo Sandejas (2018–present)
- Parokya ni Edgar (1993–present)
- Shanti Dope (2017–present)
- Sponge Cola (2006–present)
- TALA (2017–present)
- Thea Astley (2023–present)
- COLN (2019–present)
- The Knobs (2020–present)
- Troy Laureta (2021–present)

=== Mustard Music (sublabel) ===
- Good Kid$ (2018–2020)
- Issa Rodriguez (2018–present)
- Joey tha Boy (2018–present)
- The Ransom Collective (2019–present)
- Timmy Albert (2019–present)
- Barq (Arkin Magalona) (2019–present)
- La Playa (2019–present)

=== Former artists ===
- APO Hiking Society (now disbanded)
- Celeste Legaspi
- Pilita Corrales
- Samantha Chavez
- Willy Garte
- Roel Cortez
- Sheryl Cruz
- Hotdog (now disbanded)
- Itchyworms (still performing)
- Masta Plann (now currently bases in California)
- Orange and Lemons
- Gino Padilla
- Milyo Naryo
- Max Surban
- Universal Motion Dancers
- The New Everlasting Band
- Jaymie Baby
- Miguel Vera
- Dyords Javier
- Nexxus
- Jose Mari Chan (1985–2012, still performing)
- Neocolours (1988–2000)
- Lyon Smith
- Mel Valic
- Wadab
- George Yang (now chief executive of McDonald's Philippines)
- Flavors
- Willie Revillame (2002–2005)
- Karylle (2001–2008)
- Geneva Cruz (formerly from Smokey Mountain; moved to Curve Entertainment)
- Jed Madela (2003–2013)
- Dingdong Avanzado (2004–2007)
- Jessa Zaragoza (2004–2007)
- Billy Crawford (2004–2018, moved to VIVA Records)
- Kamikazee (2005–2015)
- Shamrock (2005–2010)
- Lani Misalucha (2006–2010)
- Silent Sanctuary (2006–2012)
- Ogie Alcasid (2007–2016, moved to Star Music)
- Regine Velasquez (2007–2016, returned to VIVA Records)
- Sam Concepcion (2007–2017, moved to VIVA Records)
- Nina (2010–2012)
- Jaya (2011–2014, now based in the US)
- Callalily (2012–2017, moved to O/C Records)
- Rivermaya (2012–2014, returned to Sony Music Philippines)
- She's Only Sixteen (2012–2015)
- Alden Richards (2013–2015, moved to GMA Music)
- Nikki Gil (2014–2015)
- The Company (2015–2017)
- Rico Blanco (2015–2017, moved to Sony Music Philippines)
- Fern. (2017–2020, moved to Island Records Philippines)
- Claudia Barretto (2016–2020, moved to VIVA Records)

== Trade name dispute with UMG ==
Universal Music Group cannot use the Universal name in the Philippines because URPI owns rights to that brand name. Thus, the UMG business in the Philippines became known as MCA Music, Inc., UMG's former global trade name.

On November 3, 2021, MCA Music changed its current name to UMG Philippines.

== See also ==
- PolyEast Records
- Warner Music Group (ex-parent of URPI)
- Universal Music Group (North American label)
