= Jona discography =

Filipino artist discography

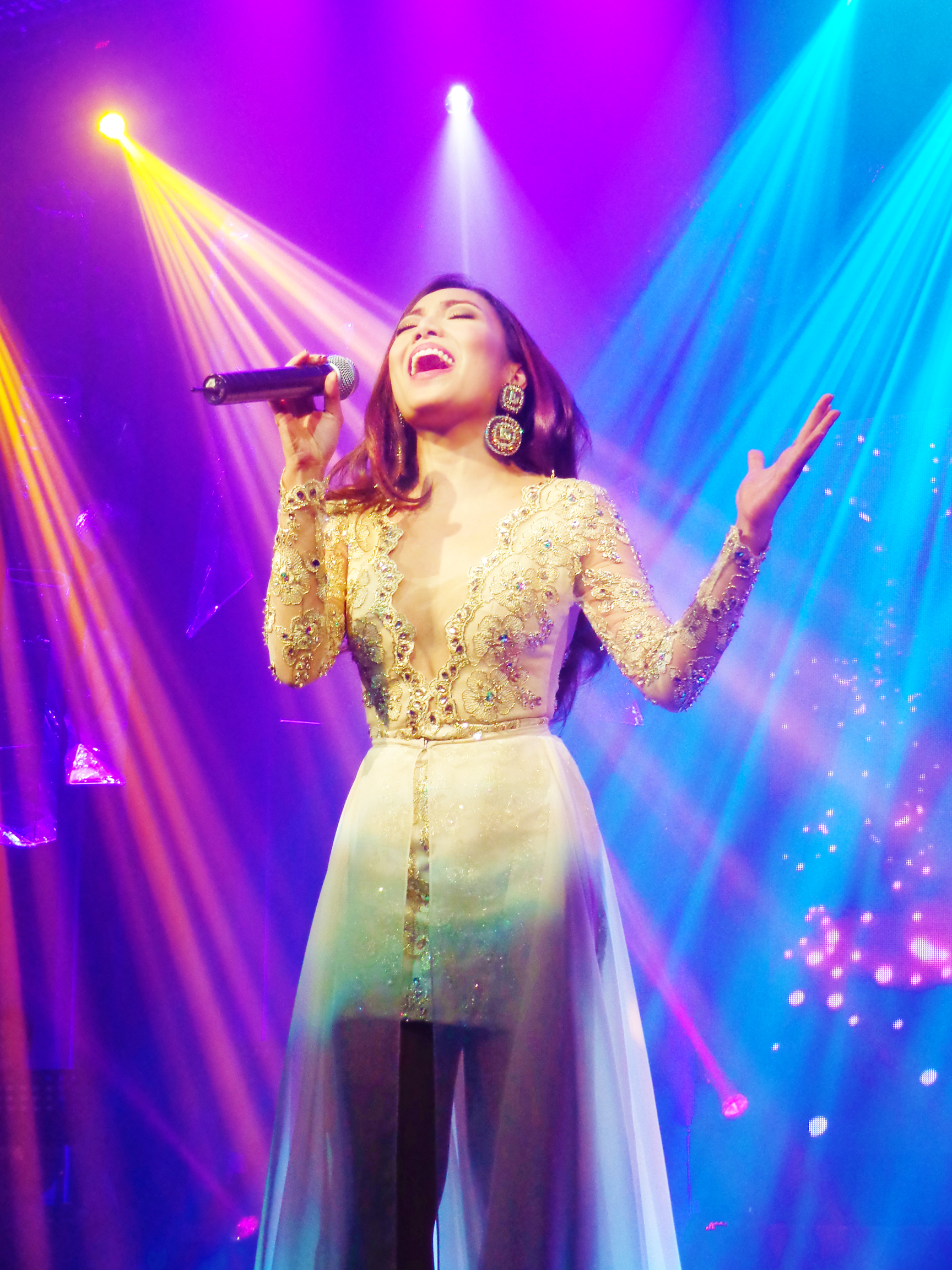
- Viray in 2013
- Studio albums: 2
- EPs: 1
- Singles: 15
- Promotional singles: 10

Filipino singer Jona has released two studio albums, one extended play and fifteen singles (including nine promotional singles). In addition, her songs have been used in 23 films and television series. In 2005, she won the television talent show Pinoy Pop Superstar and released her solo debut album On My Own the same year. It was certified Gold by the Philippine Association of the Record Industry (PARI), selling 15,000 units in the country. In 2013, she released her debut EP Jonalyn Viray under Creative Media Entertainment. Upon release, it became one of Astrovision /Astroplus best sellers and spawned the commercially successful single "Help Me Get Over". The song won 'Song of the Year' at the 6th PMPC Star Awards for Music and earned nominations at Myx Music Awards.

Her self-titled sophomore album Jona (2017) proved to be a major success. It was the best-selling album of the year while Jona was awarded the most streamed and most downloaded artist of the year at the 31st Awit Awards. The album received Gold and Platinum certifications from the Philippine Association of the Record Industry. The success of the albums' carrier singles "Maghihintay Ako", "You" and "Pusong Ligaw" made her become the first Filipino artist to simultaneously chart three songs within the Top 10 of Billboard Philippines Top 20. She earned five nominations at the 9th PMPC Star Awards for Music including 'Album of the Year' and 'Female Artist of the Year'. In 2018, Jona released the R&B song "Take It to Forever", a collaboration with Jay R and REQ. It won 'Best R&B Recording' at the 32nd Awit Awards.

== Albums ==
=== Studio albums ===
List of studio albums, with sales figures and certifications
Title	Album details	Sales	Certifications
On My Own	Released: July 1, 2005; Label: GMA Records; Format: CD, Digital download	PHI: 15,000 (Note: Philippine music certification equivalent for sales of On My Own.)	PARI: Gold
Jona	Released: February 27, 2017; Label: Star Music; Format: CD, Digital download	PHI: 15,000 (Note: Philippine music certification equivalent for sales of Jona.)	PARI: Platinum

== Extended plays ==
List of extended plays
Title	Album details
Jonalyn Viray	Released: May 19, 2013; Label: Creative Media Entertainment; Format: CD, Digital download

== Singles ==
=== As lead artist ===
List of singles as lead artist, showing year released and originating album
Title	Year	Associated album	Ref(s)
If We Just Hold On		Pinoy Pop Superstar: The Finalists	
Close to Where You Are	2005	On My Own	
Bawat Pasko	2013	Non-album single	
Nakita Kang Muli	2013	Jonalyn Viray	
Help Me Get Over	2013	Jonalyn Viray	
Sa Piling Mo	2013	Jonalyn Viray	
Heart of Glass	2015	Non-album single	
Maghihintay Ako	2016	Jona	
Ano Nga Ba Tayo?	2016	Jona	
You	2016	Jona	
I'll Never Love This Way Again (Note: The song has a duet version with Gary Valenciano, also included in Jona album)	2016	Jona	
Pusong Ligaw	2017	Jona	
Till the End of Time (with BoyBandPH, and Gabriela Nika Monique)	2017	Jona	
Last Message	2017	Jona	
Take It to Forever (with Jay R & REQ)	2018	Non-album single	

=== Promotional singles ===
List of promotional singles, showing year released and originating album
Title	Year	Album	Ref(s)
Because You Loved Me (with Kyla)	2016	Life Songs: MMK 25 Commemorative Album)	
Maybe (with Jed Madela)	2017	Hey It's Me, Jamie (30th Anniversary Album)	
Sampu	2017	Himig Handog P-Pop Love Songs	
Dark Side of Your Moon	2018	Chosen (Songs from an Original Musical)	
Bahay Kubo	2018	Awit at Laro	
Tinatapos Ko Na	2020	Himig Handog P-Pop Love Songs	
Heal	2020	Non-album promotional single	
Kaya Pala	2021	OPM Fresh Songwriters Series Vol. 1	
Someone To Love Me	2022	GILIW: A Troy Laureta OPM Collective Vol. 2	
Always On Time	2022	The Music of Jonathan Manalo: 20 Years	
Please Forgive Me	2024	GILIW: A Troy Laureta OPM Collective Vol. 3	

== Usages as soundtracks ==
List of media in which Jona's songs have been used
Year	Film / Series	Song(s)	Ref(s)
2005	Mulawin: The Movie	Ikaw Nga	
2005	Darna	Hindi Na Mag-iisa	
2006	Bakekang	Ang Mundo Ko'y Ikaw	
2007	Kung Mahawi Man ang Ulap	Mahawi Man ang Ulap	
2008	Maging Akin Ka Lamang	Maging Akin Ka Lamang	
2012	Faithfully	Ayoko na Sana	
2012	Cielo de Angelina	Natutulog Ba ang Diyos? (with Jillian Ward)	
2013	My Husband's Lover	Help Me Get Over You	
2013	Lola	Sa Piling Mo	
2013	Padam Padam	Nakita Kang Muli	
2014	Innamorata	Tanging Ika'y Mamahalin	
2014	Ang Dalawang Mrs. Real	Ikaw, Ako, at Siya (with Gabriela, and Janno Gibbs)	
2015	Kailan Ba Tama ang Mali?	Kailan Ba Tama ang Mali?	
2016	We Will Survive	I Will Survive	
2016	Dolce Amore	Spark (Note: Spark is part of the television series Dolce Amore's official soundtrack album titled Choose Amore, Choose Love.)	
2016	Barcelona:A Love Untold	I'll Never Love This Way Again	
2017	Pusong Ligaw	Pusong Ligaw	
2017	My Ex & Whys	You	
2018	Asintado	Dahil Mahal Na Mahal Kita	
2018	Sana Dalawa ang Puso	Sana Dalawa ang Puso (with Daryl Ong)	
2018	Changing Partners	Yung Pakiramdam	
2018	Ngayon at Kailanman	Ngayon at Kailanman	
2020	Paano ang Pasko?	Pasko na, Sinta Ko?	
2021	Init sa Magdamag	Init sa Magdamag	
2022	The Broken Marriage Vow	Tinatapos Ko Na	
