= Maricris Garcia =

Filipino actress and singer (born 1987)

Maricris Garcia-Cruz
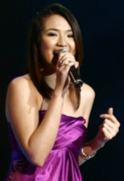
- Garcia in 2009

Background information
- Born: Maria Cristina Yu Garcia; September 26, 1987 (age 38); Caloocan, Philippines
- Genres: P-Pop, R&B, OPM
- Occupations: Singer, actress
- Years active: 2003–present
- Label: GMA Records

Maria Cristina "Maricris" Yu Garcia-Cruz (Tagalog: [mɐɾiˈkɾis gaɾˈsɪa ˈkɾus]; born September 26, 1987) is a Filipino singer and actress. She came to prominence after winning the third season of Pinoy Pop Superstar. She is the Philippines' Divine Siren.

== Early life and education ==
Maricris Garcia was born as Maria Cristina Yu Garcia on September 26, 1987, in Caloocan, Philippines. She studied tourism at the La Consolacion College in Caloocan.

== Career ==
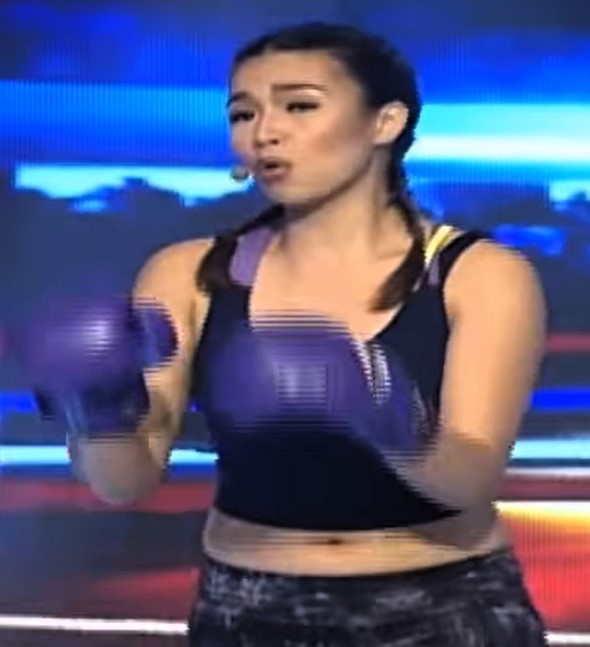
Garcia on Eat Bulaga! "BoxSing" Challenge Accepted in 2016.

She first auditioned in the first year of Pinoy Pop Superstar year but did not become a finalist. Two years later, she won with her rendition of Barry Manilow's "One Voice" at the 2007 Grand Finale of Pinoy Pop Superstar, held in Araneta Coliseum. Thus, she was awarded as the 3rd Pinoy Pop Superstar champion. Her voice is distinctly similar to the Divine Diva Zsa Zsa Padilla's voice, so she has been given the title of the "Divine Princess".

== Personal life ==
On December 16, 2016, Garcia married TJ Cruz. In May 2020, Garcia announced via Instagram that she is expecting her first child. Their daughter was born in January 2021.

== Discography ==
=== Albums ===
- Pinoy Pop Superstar Year 3 Grand Contenders' Album
  - Track 4: Beautiful Disaster (written by Rebecca Johnson & Matthew Wilder)
- Mga Awit Kapuso (Best Of GMA TV Themes) Volume 4
  - Track 5: Mahal Kita (written by Daniel Tan)
- Mahal Kita
- Pangako ng Kailanman

=== Singles ===
- Kahit Isang Saglit (revival from Martin Nievera)
- Bakit Ikaw Pa Rin (revival from Jaya)
- With You

=== Soundtracks ===
- Nang Dahil Sa Iyo (from Mga Mata ni Anghelita)
- Mahal Kita (from MariMar)
- Kung Sana Bukas (from Babangon Ako't Dudurugin Kita)
- Kung Alam Mo Lang (from Kakambal ni Eliana)
- Pinakamamahal (from The Borrowed Wife)
- Ibibigay Ko Ang Lahat (from The Half Sisters)
- Lihim (from Ang Lihim ni Annasandra)
- Nasaan (with Aicelle Santos) (from Beautiful Strangers)
- Iniibig Kita (from MariMar)
- Ako'y Mahalin (from Destiny Rose)
- Ako na Lang Ang Bibitaw (from Koreanovela series Carmina)
- Magkaibang Mundo (with Ralph King) (from Magkaibang Mundo)
- Natatanging Pag-ibig (from Sinungaling Mong Puso)
- Di Malilimot (from Someone to Watch Over Me)
- Pangarap (from Legally Blind)
- Destiny originally sung by Lyn (from My Love from the Star)
- Huwag Kang Papatay (from Ika-5 Utos)
- Tao Lang (from Pamilya Roces)
- Ganito Ako (from Dragon Lady)
- Walang Ganti (from Bihag)
- Bakit Siya? (with Aicelle Santos) (from The Better Woman)
- Kahit Ganun Pa Man (from Magkaagaw)
- Bukas Ay Para Sa Akin (from Artikulo 247)
- Sagot Sa Dalangin (from Abot-Kamay na Pangarap)
- Dito Ka Lang (from In My Heart)

== Filmography ==
=== Television ===
Year	Title	Role
2007	Pinoy Pop Superstar: Year 3	Herself
2007–10	SOP Rules	Herself
2008	Ligaw na Bulaklak	Maria Cristina
2010–13	Party Pilipinas	Herself/host
2013	Mga Basang Sisiw	Cecilia "Cecille" Reyes
2013–15	Sunday All Stars	Herself
2014–15	Yagit	Cece Ortega-Guison
2015–16	Marimar	Natalia Montenegro
2016–17	Someone to Watch Over Me	Monique
2017	My Love from the Star	Shanel Luz-Meneses
2018	The Cure	Josie
2018–19	Asawa Ko, Karibal Ko	Allison "Alice" Bravante
2018–19	Studio 7	Herself
2022–present	All-Out Sundays	Herself

== Contemporaries ==
- Jona, Pinoy Pop Superstar Year 1's Grand Winner
- Brenan Espartinez, Pinoy Pop Superstar Year 1's 1st Runner-up
- Gerald Santos, Pinoy Pop Superstar Year 2's Grand Winner
- Aicelle Santos, Pinoy Pop Superstar Year 2's 1st Runner-up
- Bryan Termulo, Pinoy Pop Superstar Year 3's 1st Runner-up

== Awards ==
- 3rd Pinoy Pop Superstar Grand Champion (June 2007)
- Best New Female Recording Artist in 1st PMPC Star Awards for Music (October 29, 2009)

== Trivia ==
- She is a GMA Network and GMA Records contract star.
- She sang Mahal Kita, one of Marimar's theme songs.
- She sang the final station ID of Q-11, with Geoff Taylor until now defunct in 2011.
- Her first music video was "Kahit Isang Saglit" in which Dennis Trillo appeared.
- Her song Mahal Kita was originally sung by the Pinoy Pop Superstar Year 2 Grand Champion Gerald Santos and revived by Maricris Garcia and became the love theme of Marimar
- She was part of a trio group named La Diva wherein her co-singers were Aicelle Santos, Jonalyn Viray.
- The "La Diva" sang the Philippine National Anthem during the Pacquiao-Cotto fight last November 15, 2009.
