= The Pinoy Pop Superstar Year 2 Grand Contenders' Album =

Compilation album by various artists
- Released: 2006
- Recorded: 2006
- Genre: Pop
- Label: GMA
- Producer: Raul Mitra

Various artists chronology
Pinoy Pop Superstar: The Finalists (2005)	The Pinoy Pop Superstar Year 2 Grand Contenders' Album (2006)	Pinoy Pop Superstar Year 3 Grand Contenders' Album (2007)

The Pinoy Pop Superstar Year 2 Grand Contenders' Album is a compilation album released in 2006 featuring pop songs sung by the finalists of the second series of the Philippine TV Show Pinoy Pop Superstar.

== Track listing ==
1. "To Where You Are" (Linda Thompson Jennes, Richard Marx) – Harry Santos
2. "Kahit Isang Saglit" (Alan Ayque, Louie Ocampo) – Gerald Santos (4:33)
3. "All the Man That I Need" (Michael Gore, Dean Pitchford) – Aicelle Santos (3:17)
4. "If I Could" (Ron Miller, Ken Hirsch, Marti Sharron) – Irra Cenina (3:34)
5. "How Can You Mend a Broken Heart" (Barry Gibb, Robin Gibb) – Denver Regencia (5:01)
6. "(You Make Me Feel Like) A Natural Woman" (Gerald Goffin, Carole King Larkey, Jerry Wexler) – Elise Estrada (2:43)
7. "Neither One of Us" (Rosemarie Tan) – Rosemarie Tan (4:17)
8. "Magsimula Ka" (Gines Tan) – (4:57)
9. "To Where You Are" (Minus One) – (4:02)
10. "Kahit Isang Saglit" (Minus One) – (4:34)
11. "All the Man That I Need" (Minus One) – (3:17)
12. "If I Could" (Minus One) – (3:34)
13. "How Can You Mend a Broken Heart" (Minus One) – (5:06)
14. "(You Make Me Feel Like) A Natural Woman" (Minus One) – (2:44)
15. "Neither One of Us" (Minus One) – (4:15)
16. "Magsimula Ka" (Minus One) – (4:53)
