= Aicelle Santos =

Filipino singer and actress (born 1985)

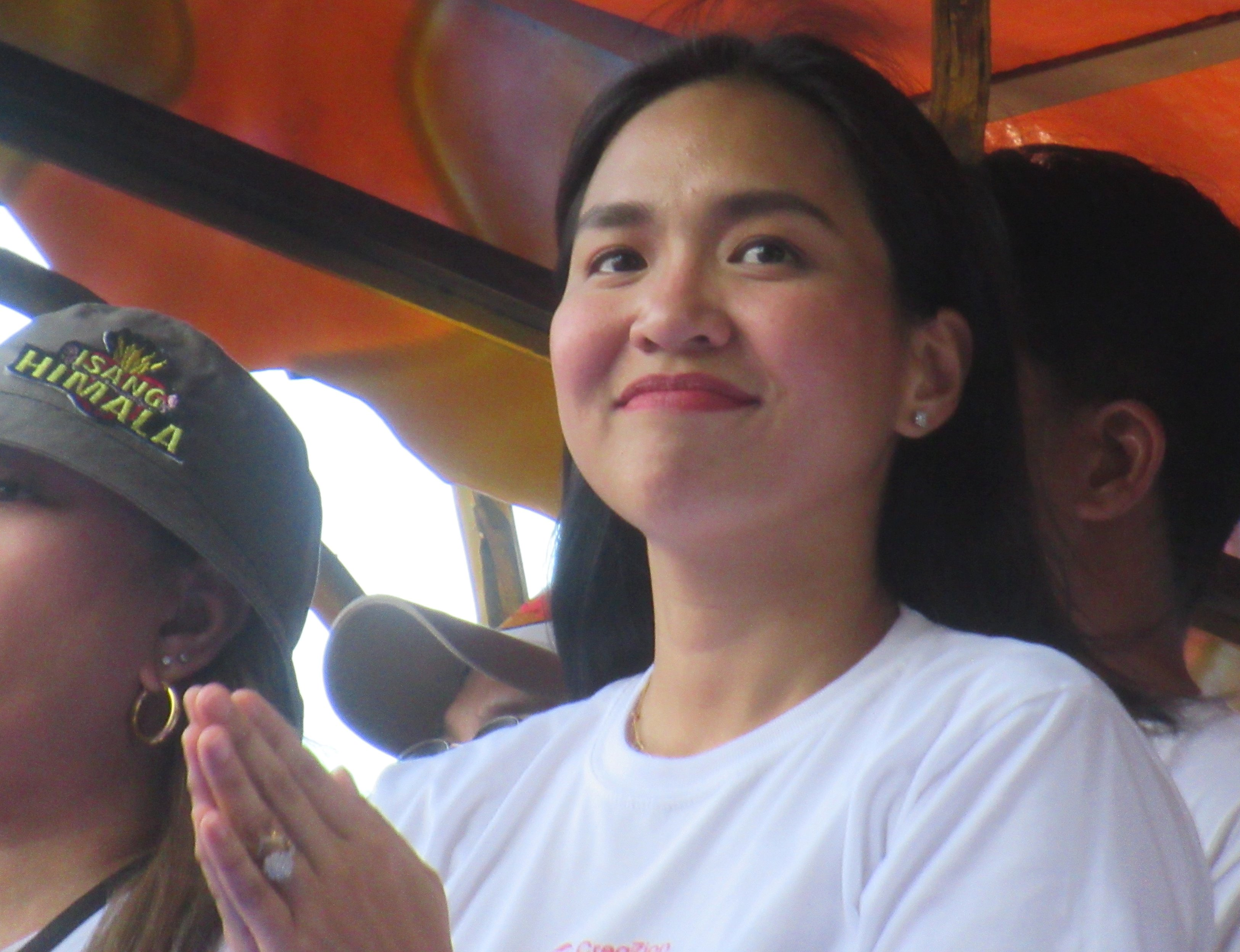
- Santos in 2024
- Born: Aicelle Anne Coronel Santos; February 24, 1985 (age 41); Manila, Philippines
- Occupations: Singer; songwriter; pianist; actress
- Years active: 2003–present
- Agent: Sparkle GMA Artist Center (2007–present)
- Spouse: Mark Zambrano (m. 2019)
- Children: 2
- Musical career
- Genres: Pop; soul; R&B
- Label: GMA Music

Aicelle Anne Coronel Santos-Zambrano (born February 24, 1985) is a Filipino singer, songwriter, pianist, actress, and TV host who first emerged in the Philippine music scene as a contestant in Star in a Million. She has been known as the "First Undefeated Pinoy Pop Superstar", when she achieved eight straight wins in GMA Network's Pinoy Pop Superstar.

== Biography ==
=== Early life and career ===
At the age of six, Aicelle Santos or "AA" received abecedarian musical training at the St. Theresa's College Quezon City, and the University of the Philippines College of Music for piano. The early training allowed Santos to indulge in her original dream to become a famous pianist. However, a shift in focus took place as she realized she would rather be a famous singer than be a known pianist. Aicelle's inspiration on the field came from Walt Disney's character Ariel from the movie The Little Mermaid. The movie's theme song "Part of Your World" was the first song Santos memorized, which she also performed during her elementary school programs.

While still at her first year of college at the Pamantasan ng Lungsod ng Maynila, Santos joined ABS-CBN's Season 1 of Star in a Million (2003), her first take on a nationwide televised singing competition. The competition opened many doors for Aicelle. Although she sometimes struggled, she eventually struck a balance between attending university and focusing on her blossoming singing career.

Santos took advantage of the minor fame that her Star in a Million appearance gave her and showcased her talents on top performers' settings with a new acoustic group Dream Sequence. Dream Sequence proved to be a success on its own right, and brought its three members to many cities around the Philippines. The Metro's prime stages Bagaberde, Chef and Brewer, Phi Bar, Fiesta San Miguel in Dusit, E's Bar in Edsa Shangri-La, and others became the group's main performing stages. The nightly gigs are believed to have been Aicelle's training ground for improving her vocal and stage performance.

On January 4, 2016, Santos interpreted "Sa Iyo Lamang" which was composed by Cris Bautista in A Song of Praise Music Festival year 4, a gospel songwriting competition, in UNTV with Reymond Sajor, Leah Patricio, Rachelle Ann Go, Frencheska Farr, Jonalyn Viray, Rita De Guzman, RJ Buena & Kyla.

In 2018, Santos bid farewell to fans as she will be leaving for United Kingdom to star as Gigi Van Tranh in the hit musical Miss Saigon.

== Auditions ==
=== Pinoy Pop Superstar ===
In 2005, Santos once again decided to aim for a solo singing career by joining the second season of Pinoy Pop Superstar. An eight-straight win during preliminaries put Santos on top and on the show's history, as the first 'Undefeated Superstar.' She showcased her wide vocal range on her performances of:

- "All The Man That I Need" – Week 1
- "I Need You" – Week 2
- "Natural Woman" – Week 3
- "A House Is Not a Home" – Week 4
- "Respect" – Week 5
- "Summertime" – Week 6
- "A Song for You" – Week 7
- "Man in the Mirror" – Week 8

Santos got into the finals favored to win. On PPS's season finale, Aicelle Santos claimed first runner-up and signed a record deal and an exclusive management contract under GMA Artist Center. Her story in Pinoy Pop Superstar is somehow related to Sheryn Regis.

=== Music career ===
Santos possesses the vocal range of a lyric contralto, spanning three full octaves (from the lowest note of Bb2 to the highest note of Bb5).

Santos won "Best Performance of Own Country Song" representing the Philippines in Astana Music Festival in Kazakhstan. Santos bested delegates from 13 countries around the world, including Mexico, Peru, Finland, Romania, Latvia, Bulgaria, Czech Republic, Tajikistan, Lithuania, Sri Lanka, Indonesia, Malta, and China. Her winning piece was entitled "Bakit Di Subukan", a Vehnee Saturno composition which is a Tagalog-English song ("If We Just Hold On" in English). Following this triumph was Aicelle's recognition for "People's Choice Best New Female Artist" in the 2007 Awit Awards.

In 2007, Santos is visible in the Philippines recording scene with her debut album Make Me Believe, a 14-cut album under GMA Records. "Ikaw Pa Rin" is her hit single in the charts.

In 2008, she joined fellow Pinoy Pop Superstar contestants Jona and Maricris Garcia to form the musical group La Diva.

On February 25, 2015, Santos held her first solo concert, Class A, at the PETA Theatre. On the same year, she released the music video of her latest single Kapangyarihan ng Pag-ibig.

=== Theatrical work ===
In 2012, Santos auditioned and was part of the shortlist for the 2014 West End revival of Miss Saigon.

In 2013, she debuted in the theatrical scene by portraying the role of Katy in Katy! the Musical. She also stars in Rak of Aegis where she plays the lead character, Aileen (alternating with Kim Molina). The musical had several runs but Aicelle continues to play the role till present. Aicelle won Best Actress in a Musical in the 2014 Aliw Awards for her performance in Rak of Aegis.

In 2015, Santos had a special participation in the musical entitled Sabel: Love and Passion.

In 2017, she played Perla in the musical adaptation of Manila in the Claws of Light and won the 2017 Aliw Award for Best Actress in a Featured Role.

In 2018, Santos played Elsa in the second revival of Himala: Isang Musikal, based on the 1982 film starring Nora Aunor. She is set to play the role of Gigi in the UK/Ireland tour of Miss Saigon.

On May 6, 2023, Santos was part of the one-night staging of Larawan as Contra Mundum, a grand tribute concert to kick off National Heritage Month and to mark 50 years of the establishment of the Philippine's Order of National Artists. She played Candida in Act 2.

== Personal life ==
Santos married her boyfriend of three years, former broadcast journalist Mark Zambrano, on November 16, 2019, in San Juan, Batangas. In June 2020, Santos announced on an Instagram post that she and Zambrano were expecting their first child, due in December.

== Discography ==
=== Studio albums ===
- Make Me Believe (2007)
- Liwanag (2015)

=== Singles ===
- "Ikaw Pa Rin" (2007)
- "Make Me Believe" (2007)
- "Kapangyarihan ng Pag-Ibig" (2015)
- "Liwanag" (2016)
- "Palaging Ikaw" (2017)

=== Soundtracks ===
- "Tayong Dalawa" (2006) (from Bakekang)
- "Maghihintay" (2007) (from Impostora)
- "I'll Never Go" (with Gian Magdangal) (2013) (from My Lady Boss)
- "Paliparin ang Pangarap" (with Maricris Garcia) (2013) (from Adarna)
- "Liyab" (2014) (from Niño)
- "Be With You" (2015) (from The Rich Man's Daughter)
- "Nasaan" (with Maricris Garcia) (2015) (from Beautiful Strangers)
- "Hanggang Makita Kang Muli" (2016) (from the theme song of same teleserye)
- "Sa Lahat ng Iba" (with Hannah Precillas) (2016) (from Ika-6 na Utos)
- "Kumapit Ka Lang" (2017) (from Tadhana)
- "Haplos" (2017) (from Haplos)
- "Nasa Iyong Tabi" (2017) (from Super Ma'am)
- "Bahagi Ko ng Langit (2018) (from The Stepdaughters)
- "Panata sa Bayan" (2019) (from Eleksyon 2019 and Eleksyon 2022 Coverages of GMA News)
- "Bakit Siya?" (with Maricris Garcia) (2019) (from The Better Woman)
- "Ikaw ang Aking Daigdig" (2022) (from Unica Hija)

=== Compilation albums ===
- The Pinoy Pop Superstar Year 2 Contenders' Album (2006)
  - Track 3: All the Man That I Need
- Mga Awit mula sa Puso, Vol. 2 (2006)
  - Track 3: "Tayong Dalawa"
- Mga Awit Kapuso, Vol. 4 (2008)
  - Track 3: "Marimar"
  - The Best of Mga Awit Kapuso (2009)
  - Track 10: "Tayong Dalawa"
- GMA Records No.1 Hits (2013)
  - Track: "Ikaw Pa Rin" (with Janno Gibbs)
- Take1: the Best of Awit Kapuso Originals (2013)
  - Track 9: "Marimar"
- Versions 7.1 (2014)
  - Track 2: "All the Man That I Need"

== Theatre ==
Year	Title	Role	Venue
2013	Katy! the Musical	Katy	CCP Theater
2014	Rak of Aegis	Aileen	PETA Theater
2015	Sabel: Love and Passion	(special participation)	Music Museum
2017	Maynila sa mga Kuko ng Liwanag	Perla	Kia Theater
2018	Himala: Isang Musikal	Elsa	PowerMac Center Spotlight

== Filmography ==
=== Film ===
Year	Title	Role	Note(s)	Ref(s).
2017	Ang Larawan	Violet		
2024	Isang Himala	Elsa		

=== Television ===
As herself

Year	Program	Notes
2005	Star in a Million	As contestant
2005–2006	Pinoy Pop Superstar: Year 2	As contestant
2006–2010	SOP	As performer
2010–2013	Party Pilipinas	As performer
2013–2015	Sunday All Stars	As performer
2015–2017	Eat Bulaga!	As Aegis Pa More contestant (2015) as judge on various segments (2015–2016) as co-host for Traffic Diva segment (2016) and Music Hero segment (2016–2017) as model on Kalyeserye segment (2016) as Cord Sponsor on Kalyeserye: The Wedding (2016)
2016	Superstar Duets	As Judge
2018–2019	Studio 7	As co-host / performer
2020–present	All-Out Sundays	As co-host / performer
2020–2021	Centerstage	Judge

As actress

Year	Program	Role
2012–2013	Temptation of Wife	Katrina P. Sebastian
2013	Love and Lies	Ligaya Salvador
2014	Ang Dalawang Mrs. Real	May
2014	Strawberry Lane	Lani Delgado
2015–2016	Buena Familia	Olga Vergara
2017	Impostora	Deedee Castro

== Awards and recognitions ==
Year	Award giving body	Category	Nominated work	Results
2006	Astana Music Festival (Kazakhstan)	Best Performance of Own Country Song	"Bakit Di Subukan"	Won
2006	Astana Music Festival (Kazakhstan)	Interpreter (gold medal)	"Aking Ama"	Won
2008	21st Awit Awards	Best Performance by a Female Recording Artist (People's Choice)	"Ikaw Pa Rin"	Won
2008	21st Awit Awards	Best Performance by a Female Recording Artist (Performance Award)	"Ikaw Pa Rin"	Nominated
2008	21st Awit Awards	Best R&B Recording (Creativity Awards)	"Ikaw Pa Rin"	Nominated
2008	Guillermo Mendoza Awards	Most Promising Female Singer	—N/a	Won
2014	Aliw Awards	Best Actress in a Musical	Rak of Aegis	Won
2015	7th PMPC Star Awards for Music	Female Concert Performer of the Year	Class A	Nominated
2017	Aliw Awards	Best Actress for a Featured Role	Maynila sa mga Kuko ng Liwanag	Won
2018	Gawad Buhay Awards	Female Featured Performance in a Musical	Maynila sa mga Kuko ng Liwanag	Won
2024	50th Metro Manila Film Festival	Best Actress	Isang Himala	Nominated
2025	Gawad Urian 2025	Best Actress	Isang Himala	Nominated

== Contemporaries ==
- Jona
- Carla Humphries
- Maricris Garcia
- Bryan Termulo
- Jan Nieto
- Gian Magdangal
