= Blue town syndicate =

Blue Town Syndicate is a Hollywood music production house/talent management and music publishing company based in Los Angeles founded by one of SkeeTV's music producer/songwriter and Angry Mob Music artist TH8A a.k.a. Joe Fabio in the summer of 2009. It now houses some of the important names in the indie world of music such as Philippines' Pop and R&B sensation Brenan, soul singer/songwriter Jack Davey of J*Davey, MC/songwriter Shawn Anthony Wright and Asian singer/songwriter and rap artist Dianne Franc.

TH8A a.k.a. Joe Fabio is known for producing, performing and releasing the song Working Life for the showtime TV series Shameless last January 2013. He started working with Filipino popstars Brenan and Dianne Franc last February 2013 and released singles for their upcoming albums Unrestricted and Virtual Love Affair. All albums are released through Bandcamp as of the moment but word is out that they will be hitting iTunes for the entire tracks soon.

== Blue Town Syndicate Released Songs ==
Brenan:

Unrestricted- single

Dianne Franc:

Album- Dianne Franc

Songs: Virtual Love Affair Tyranny

Full album is set to release on June 30, 2013

Jack Davey:

The Road to Hell- single

Shawn Anthony Wright:

Album- Fallbrook

Songs: Yes No, Good As Good, Best Actress, Hey There Beautiful, The Love
