= Make Me Believe =

Studio album by Aicelle Santos
- Released: 2007
- Genre: pop
- Label: GMA Records

Make Me Believe is a music album of Pinoy Pop Superstar 2006 1st runner up and GMA Network talent Aicelle Santos. It was released under GMA Records and released 2 successful singles "Ikaw Pa Rin" and "Make Me Believe".

== Composition ==
Make Me Believe's lead single is "Ikaw Pa Rin", which was written by Janno Gibbs. The album also features covers of "A House Is Not A Home" and "Give Me One Reason".

== Track Listing ==
1. Ikaw Pa Rin (Video)
  Lyrics & Music by: Janno Gibbs / Arranged by: Marvin Querido
2. Lullabies
  Lyrics & Music by: Francis Salazar / Arranged by: Albert Tamayo
3. Make Me Believe (Video)
  Lyrics & Music by: Francis Salazar / Arranged by: Melvin Morallos
4. All Gone (My Lingering's Over)
  Lyrics by: Aicelle Santos / Music by: Ryan Padecio & Mike Delos Reyes / Arranged by: Marvin Querido
5. A House Is Not A Home
  Lyrics by: Hal David / Music by: Burt Bacharach / Arranged by: Marvin Querido
6. Nasaan
  Lyrics & Music by: Vehnee Saturno / Arranged by: Marc Santos
7. Give Me One Reason
  Lyrics & Music by: Tracy Chapman / Arranged by: Jun Tamayo
8. Tunay Bang Iibigin
  Lyrics by: Aicelle Santos / Music by: Ryan Padecio, Redj Saguin, & Mike Delos Reyes / Arranged by: Jun Tamayo
9. Kung Bakit Ngayon
  Lyrics & Music by: Vehnee Saturno / Arranged by: Marc Santos
10. All The Man That I Need
  Lyrics by: Dean Pitchford / Music by: Michael Gore
11. Maghihintay
  Lyrics & Music by: Tata Betita

== Singles ==
Year	Title	Peak
2007	Ikaw Pa Rin	1
2007	Make Me Believe	15

== See also ==
- GMA Network
