= Pusong Ligaw (song) =

2009 song performed by Jericho Rosales

Single by Jericho Rosales

from the album Change
- Released: January 11, 2010
- Recorded: October 24, 2009
- Genre: Alternative rock Pop
- Length: 4:06
- Label: Star Records
- Songwriters: Jericho Rosales; Augusto Elizalde, Jr.

Music video
- "Pusong Ligaw" on YouTube

"Pusong Ligaw" (transl. The Misguided Heart) is a single by Filipino singer and actor Jericho Rosales. The song was written by Rosales and was released on January 11, 2010, under the Star Records label. The song is included in his 2009 album, Change.

Rosales adapted the song for the 2009 television series Dahil May Isang Ikaw, where he starred alongside former off-screen partner Kristine Hermosa. According to him, the production requested a song for the series, leading him to rewrite an existing unreleased composition to fit the show's narrative.

== Track listing ==
Digital download
No.	Title	Length
1.	"Pusong Ligaw"	4:06

== Chart performance ==
=== Weekly charts ===
Chart (2017)	Peak position
Philippines (Catalog Charts)	3

== Michael Pangilinan version ==
"Pusong Ligaw"

Single by Michael Pangilinan
- Released: April 28, 2015
- Recorded: 2015
- Genre: Pop
- Length: 4:08
- Label: ABS-CBN Film Productions, Inc.
- Songwriters: Jericho Rosales; Augusto Elizalde, Jr.

In 2015, Filipino singer Michael Pangilinan recorded and released his version of Pusong Ligaw for the television series, Bridges of Love. One of the leading actors of the said television series is Jericho Rosales, the composer and the original recording artist of the song.

=== Track listing ===
Digital download
No.	Title	Length
1.	"Pusong Ligaw"	4:08

== Jona version ==
"Pusong Ligaw"

Song by Jona

from the album Jona
- Language: Tagalog
- Genre: Pop
- Length: 4:26
- Label: ABS-CBN Film Productions, Inc.
- Songwriters: Jericho Rosales; Augusto Elizalde, Jr.
- Producer: Jonathan Manalo

In 2017, the song was again recorded this time by Jona for her 2017 self-titled album (after changing her screen name from Jonalyn Viray to Jona). Just like the version of Michael Pangilinan, Jona's version was also used as the theme song of the 2017 television series of the same name.

=== Chart performance ===
==== Weekly charts (Jona version) ====
Chart (2017)	Peak position
Philippines (Philippine Hot 100)	28
Philippines (Philippine Top 20)	3

==== Year-End charts (Jona version) ====
Chart (2017)	Rank
Philippines (Philippine Top 20)	4
