= Superstar Duets =

2016 Philippine television reality show

- Title card
- Genre: Reality show
- Directed by: Bert de Leon
- Presented by: Jennylyn Mercado
- Judges: Allan K.; Aicelle Santos; Christian Bautista
- Country of origin: Philippines
- Original language: Tagalog
- No. of episodes: 16

Production
- Executive producer: Maria Luisa Cadag
- Camera setup: Multiple-camera setup
- Running time: 60 minutes
- Production company: GMA Entertainment TV

Original release
- Network: GMA Network
- Release: September 3 – December 17, 2016

Superstar Duets is a 2016 Philippine television reality show broadcast by GMA Network. Directed by Bert de Leon, it is hosted by Jennylyn Mercado. It premiered on September 3, 2016 on the network's Sabado Star Power sa Gabi line up. The show concluded on December 17, 2016, with a total of 16 episodes.

== Cast ==
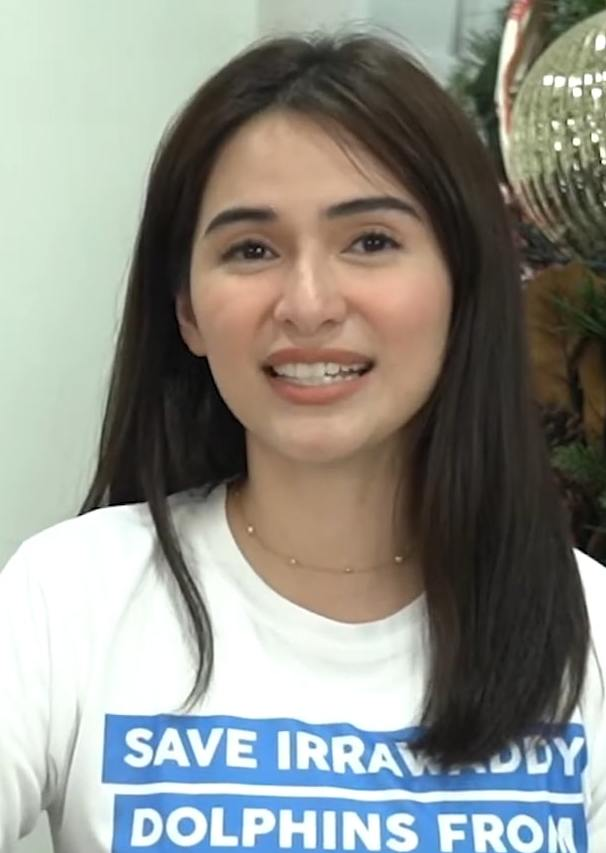
Jennylyn Mercado served as a host.

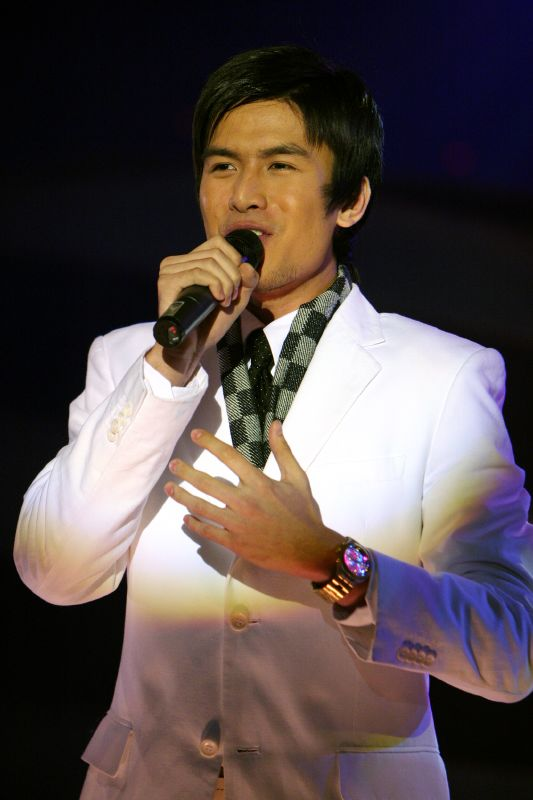
Christian Bautista served as a judge.

Host

- Jennylyn Mercado
- Regine Velasquez (guest host)

Judges

- Allan K.
- Aicelle Santos
- Christian Bautista

Contestants

- Michael "Pekto" Nacua
- Joross Gamboa
- Jerald Napoles
- Rita Daniela
- Denise Barbacena
- Divine Aucina
- Nar Cabico
- Jeffrey "Osang" Soliven

== International star impersonators ==
1st batch Episodes 1-4	2nd batch Episodes 5-7	3rd batch (UPM) Episodes 8-10	4th batch Episode 11
Celine Dionesia; Seeyah Later; Adele Antada^{1}; Samboy Smith; Justin Tatlong Bibe; Nicki Balaj; Ariana Venti; Jessie J. Puno	Tina Torture^{1}; Ma. Katy Perry; Ibon Jovi; Gutom Jones; Cher Gil; White Lady Gaga	Whitney Usedto; Amy Beerhouse; Michael Jackstone^{1}^{3}; Freddie Mercules^{1}; Luther Vandolph; Punk Sinatra	Bruno Marshmallow; Meghanon Trainor; Piggy Azalea; Adam Levintador; Christina Basagulera^{3}
5th batch^{2} Episode 13	6th batch Episode 14	7th batch Episode 15	
A. Bono; Kabibeyonce; Diana Chos; Rihanna Ramos; Drake Vargas	Stevie Wonder Woman; Madonna Cruz; Vinaboy George; Prince Epal	Miley Virus; Pinkantadia; Adele Antada	

1. International star impersonator performed in the wildcard round.
2. The Top 5 celebrity contestants were also the international star impersonators on this episode.
3. International star impersonator performed in the grand finals.

== Preliminary rounds ==
Color key

Contestant safe from elimination
Contestant placed in bottom group
Contestant eliminated
Contestant granted immunity
Contestant re-enters the competition

=== Round 1 ===
The contestants will be divided into two batch. Each batch will have two contestants who got the lowest score placed in the bottom group . Bottom group contestants will face the elimination round while the safe contestants will fight for immunity.

Episode	Order	Contestant	Partner	Song	Score
Episode 1 (September 3)	1	Mike 'Pekto' Nacua	Seeyah Later	"Chandelier"	14 stars
Episode 1 (September 3)	2	Denise Barbacena	Nicki Balaj	"Super Bass"	17 stars
Episode 1 (September 3)	3	Rita Daniela	Ariana Venti	"Break Free"	< 14 stars
Episode 1 (September 3)	4	Jeffrey 'Osang' Soliven	Justin Tatlong Bibe	"Baby"	19 stars
Episode 2 (September 10)	1	Divine Aucina	Jessie J. Puno	"Domino"	15 stars
Episode 2 (September 10)	2	Jerald Napoles	Celine Dionesia	"The Prayer"	13 stars
Episode 2 (September 10)	3	Nar Cabico	Samboy Smith	"Lay Me Down"	19 stars
Episode 2 (September 10)	4	Joross Gamboa	Adele Antada	"Rolling in the Deep"	< 13 stars
Episode 3: First elimination (September 17)	1	Jerald Napoles	Celine Dionesia	"Power of Love"	16 stars
Episode 3: First elimination (September 17)	2	Rita Daniela	Ariana Venti	"One Last Time"	19 stars
Episode 3: First elimination (September 17)	3	Joross Gamboa	Adele Antada	"Someone Like You"	15 stars
Episode 3: First elimination (September 17)	4	Pekto Nacua	Seeyah Later	"Titanium"	14 stars
Episode 4: Immunity round (September 24)	1	Osang Soliven	Justin Tatlong Bibe	"Eenie Meenie"	< 19 stars
Episode 4: Immunity round (September 24)	2	Nar Cabico	Samboy Smith	"Stay with Me"	19 stars
Episode 4: Immunity round (September 24)	3	Divine Aucina	Jessie J. Puno	"Price Tag"	< 19 stars
Episode 4: Immunity round (September 24)	4	Denise Barbacena	Nicki Balaj	"Starships"	< 21 stars

=== Round 2 ===
The same rule applies for this round except for the immunity round.

Episode	Order	Contestant	Partner	Song	Score
Episode 5 (October 1)	1	Osang Soliven	Tina Torture	"Proud Mary"	17 stars
Episode 5 (October 1)	2	Rita Daniela	Ma. Katy Perry	"California Gurls"	< 17 stars
Episode 5 (October 1)	3	Joross Gamboa	Ibon Jovi	"It's My Life"	< 17 stars
Episode 6 (October 8)	1	Denise Barbacena	Cher Gil	"Believe"	Did not reveal
Episode 6 (October 8)	2	Jerald Napoles	Gutom Jones	"Sexbomb"	Did not reveal
Episode 6 (October 8)	3	Divine Aucina	White Lady Gaga	"Bad Romance"	Did not reveal
Episode 7: Second Elimination (October 15)	1	Jerald Napoles	Gutom Jones	"Kiss"	> 12 stars
Episode 7: Second Elimination (October 15)	2	Rita Daniela	Ma. Katy Perry	"Firework"	> 12 stars
Episode 7: Second Elimination (October 15)	3	Denise Barbacena	Cher Gil	"Strong Enough"	12 stars
Episode 7: Second Elimination (October 15)	4	Joross Gamboa	Ibon Jovi	"You Give Love A Bad Name"	> 12 stars

=== Round 3 ===
The same rule applies for this round except for the third elimination wherein each of the bottom group contestants will have their Celebrity resbaker.

Episode	Order	Contestant	Partner	Celebrity Resbaker	Song	Score
Episode 8 (October 22)	1	Nar Cabico	Whitney Usedto	—N/a	"I Will Always Love You"	Did not reveal
Episode 8 (October 22)	2	Osang Soliven	Amy Beerhouse	—N/a	"Rehab"	Did not reveal
Episode 8 (October 22)	3	Divine Aucina	Michael Jackstone	—N/a	"I'll Be There"	Did not reveal
Episode 9 (October 29)	1	Joross Gamboa	Freddie Mercules	—N/a	"Bohemian Rhapsody"	18 stars
Episode 9 (October 29)	2	Rita Daniela	Luther Vandolph	—N/a	"Dance With My Father"	17 stars
Episode 9 (October 29)	3	Jerald Napoles	Punk Sinatra	—N/a	"Fly Me To The Moon"	< 17 stars
Episode 10: Third Elimination (November 5)	1	Rita Daniela	Luther Vandolph	Julie Anne San Jose	"I'd Rather"	16 stars
Episode 10: Third Elimination (November 5)	2	Divine Aucina	Michael Jackstone	Jak Roberto	"Beat It"	18 stars
Episode 10: Third Elimination (November 5)	3	Osang Soliven	Amy Beerhouse	Kim Idol	"Valerie"	14 stars
Episode 10: Third Elimination (November 5)	4	Jerald Napoles	Punk Sinatra	Boobsie	"New York, New York"	16 stars

=== Round 4 ===
The five remaining contestants will perform. The contestant with lowest star rating from the judges will be eliminated from the competition.

Episode	Order	Contestant	Partner	Song	Score
Episode 11 (November 12)	1	Joross Gamboa	Bruno Marshmallow	"Uptown Funk"	16 stars
Episode 11 (November 12)	2	Nar Cabico	Meghanon Trainor	"Like I'm Gonna Lose You"	> 16 stars
Episode 11 (November 12)	3	Rita Daniela	Piggy Azalea	"Fancy"	> 16 stars
Episode 11 (November 12)	4	Divine Aucina	Adam Levintador	"Moves Like Jagger"	15 stars
Episode 11 (November 12)	5	Jerald Napoles	Christina Basagulera	"Fighter"	> 16 stars

=== Wildcard round ===
The 4 eliminated contestants perform again for a second chance to be back at the competition. The contestant with highest star rating will re-enter the competition. All songs performed on this episode are songs of Aegis.

Episode	Order	Contestant	Partner	Song	Score
Episode 12 (November 19)	1	Mike "Pekto" Nacua	Tina Torture	"Basang-basa Sa Ulan"	< 18 stars
Episode 12 (November 19)	2	Denise Barbacena	Michael Jackstone	"Halik"	< 18 stars
Episode 12 (November 19)	3	Osang Soliven	Adele Antada	"Luha"	< 18 stars
Episode 12 (November 19)	4	Divine Aucina	Freddie Mercules	"Sinta"	18 stars

== Finals ==
Color key

Contestant safe from elimination
Contestant eliminated
Contestant announced as the runner-up
Contestant announced as the grand winner

=== Round 5 ===
The Final 5 contestants will impersonate an international star of their choice instead of having an impersonator partner as duet. Each celebrity contestant will be paired to OPM icons. The contestant with lowest score will be eliminated from the competition.

Episode	Order	Contestant	Partner	Song	Score
Episode 13 (November 26)	1	Joross Gamboa as A. Bono	Jett Pangan	"With or Without You" / "Salamat"	Did not reveal
Episode 13 (November 26)	2	Rita Daniela as Kabibeyonce	Joey Generoso	"Love on Top" / "Tuloy Pa Rin Ako"	Did not reveal
Episode 13 (November 26)	3	Nar Cabico as Diana Chos	Imelda Papin	"It's My Turn" / "Bakit"	Did not reveal
Episode 13 (November 26)	4	Divine Aucina as Rihanna Ramos	Jessa Zaragosa	"Umbrella" / "Bakit Pa"	Did not reveal
Episode 13 (November 26)	5	Jerald Napoles as Drake Vargas	Andrew E.	"Hotline Bling" / "Humanap Ka Ng Panget"	Did not reveal

=== Quarter finals ===
The Final 4 contestants perform. The celebrity contestant with lowest star rating will be eliminated from the competition. All songs performed are songs of Regine Velasquez.

Episode	Order	Contestant	Partner	Song	Score
Episode 14 (December 3)	1	Nar Cabico	Stevie Wonder Woman	"Hanggang Ngayon"	> 15 stars
Episode 14 (December 3)	2	Divine Aucina	Madonna Cruz	"Dadalhin"	15 stars
Episode 14 (December 3)	3	Jerald Napoles	Vinaboy George	"Pangako"	> 15 stars
Episode 14 (December 3)	4	Rita Daniela	Prince Epal	"Kailangan Ko'y Ikaw"	20 stars

=== Semi finals ===
The final 3 contestants perform. The celebrity contestant with lowest star rating will be eliminated from the competition. Ai-Ai delas Alas served as a judge.

Episode	Order	Contestant	Partner	Song	Score
Episode 15 (December 10)	1	Jerald Napoles	Miley Virus	"Wrecking Ball"	24 stars
Episode 15 (December 10)	2	Rita Daniela	Pinkantadia	"Just Give Me a Reason"	23 stars
Episode 15 (December 10)	3	Nar Cabico	Adele Antada	"All I Ask"	28 stars

=== Grand finals ===
The grand finals consists of 3 rounds wherein the final 2 contestants will perform. On the first round, they will have a concert style duet with Lani Misalucha. The second round will be video mirroring challenge wherein they will copy a music video content. And for the third round, the final 2 will have a duet with international superstar of their choice. Ai-Ai delas Alas served as the 4th judge.

Episode	Round	Contestant	Partner	Song	Score
Episode 16 (December 17)	1	Jerald Napoles	Lani Misalucha	"Queen of the Night"	19 stars
Episode 16 (December 17)	1	Nar Cabico	Lani Misalucha	"Queen of the Night"	19 stars
Episode 16 (December 17)	2	Jerald Napoles	—N/a	"24K Magic"	19 stars
Episode 16 (December 17)	2	Nar Cabico	—N/a	"24K Magic"	19 stars
Episode 16 (December 17)	3	Jerald Napoles	Michael Jackstone	"Smooth Criminal"	24 stars
Episode 16 (December 17)	3	Nar Cabico	Christina Basagulera	"Lady Marmalade"	26 stars

== Ratings ==
Urban Luzon and NUTAM (Nationwide Urban Television Audience Measurement) ratings are provided by AGB Nielsen Philippines while Kantar Media Philippines provide Nationwide ratings (Urban + Rural).

No.	Episode	Original air date	AGB Nielsen Urban Luzon			Kantar Media Nationwide			Ref.
No.	Episode	Original air date	Rating	Timeslot rank	Primetime rank	Rating	Timeslot rank	Primetime rank	Ref.
1	"Round 1–part 1"	September 3, 2016	18.3%	#1	#4	13.2%	#2	#9	
2	"Round 1–part 2"	September 10, 2016	13.0%	#2	#7	9.8%	#2	#9	
3	"First Elimination Night"	September 17, 2016	15.1%	#1	#6	10.7%	#2	#9	
4	"Immunity Round"	September 24, 2016	13.9%	#2	#7	10.5%	#2	—N/a	
5	"Round 2–part 1"	October 1, 2016	14.3%	#1	#6	10.4%	#2	#9	
6	"Round 2–part 2"	October 8, 2016	12.9%	#2	#9	9.3%	#2	#9	
7	"Second Elimination Night"	October 15, 2016	14.3%	#1	#8	10.1%	#2	#9	
8	"Round 3–part 1"	October 22, 2016	14.3%	#1	#7	9.2%	#2	#9	
9	"Round 3–part 2"	October 29, 2016	13.3%	#1	#7	9.3%	#2	#9	
10	"Third Elimination Night"	November 5, 2016	13.3%	#1	#7	9.6%	#2	#9	
11	"Round 4"	November 12, 2016	14.0%	#1	#6	9.5%	#2	#9	
12	"Wildcard Round"	November 19, 2016	15.1%	#1	#5	—N/a	—N/a	—N/a	
13	Round 5"	November 26, 2016	13.1%	#1	#5	9.5%	#2	#9	
14	"Quarter Finals"	December 3, 2016	11.5%	#1	#8	9.5%	#2	#9	
14	"Quarter Finals"	December 3, 2016	AGB Nielsen NUTAM			Kantar Media Nationwide			
15	"Semi Finals"	December 10, 2016	12.0%	#1	#8	10.9%	#2	#9	
16	"Grand Finals"	December 17, 2016	11.8%	#3	#8	9.9%	#2	#8	

== Accolades ==
Accolades received by Superstar Duets
Year	Award	Category	Recipient	Result	Ref.
2017	31st PMPC Star Awards for Television	Best Game Show	Superstar Duets	Nominated	
2017	31st PMPC Star Awards for Television	Best Game Show Host	Jennylyn Mercado	Nominated	
