= Maghihintay Ako =

2017 song by Jona Viray

Single by Jona Viray

from the album Jona
- Released: March 1, 2017
- Label: Star Music
- Songwriter: Dante Bantatua

Jona Viray singles chronology
""Matibay" (featuring Regine Velasquez)" (2017)	"Maghihintay Ako" (2017)	""Till the End of Time"" (2017)

Music video
- "Maghihintay Ako" on YouTube

"Maghihintay Ako" is a song recorded by Filipino singer Jona Viray for her third studio album, Jona (2017), originally made for Himig Handog 2016. It was written by Dante Bantatua and arranged by Albert Tamayo. "Maghihintay Ako" was released on March 1, 2017, by Star Music as the lead single from Jona.

In the Philippines, the song debuted at number 4 and peaked at No. 3 on the first Billboard Philippine Top 20 becoming Jona's second top ten song on the chart after "Pusong Ligaw" has peaked at number three. This made Jona the first top 10 arrival for a lead female artist making her first Top 20 appearance. The song peaked at number one in Myx Hit Chart for three weeks. The song also enjoyed a massive success in FM radio stations airplay. The song also won "Song of The Year" for MOR 2017 Music Awards.

== Weekly charts ==
Year	Title	Peak position	Reference
2017	Billboard Philippine Top 20	3	
2017	Billboard Philippine Hot 100	28	
2017	MYX Weekly Chart	1	
