= Beautiful Strangers (TV series) =

2015 Philippine television drama series

- Title card
- Genre: Drama
- Created by: Aloy Adlawan
- Written by: Glaiza Ramirez; Marlon Miguel; Glibeys Sardea
- Directed by: Albert Langitan
- Creative director: Roy Iglesias
- Starring: Heart Evangelista; Lovi Poe
- Theme music composer: Jon Meer Vera Perez; Adonis Tabanda
- Opening theme: "Nasaan" by Aicelle Santos and Maricris Garcia
- Country of origin: Philippines
- Original language: Tagalog
- No. of episodes: 80 (list of episodes)

Production
- Executive producer: Kaye Atienza-Cadsawan
- Cinematography: Rommel Santos
- Editors: Lara Linsangan; Mark Sison; Julius Castillo
- Camera setup: Multiple-camera setup
- Running time: 26–32 minutes
- Production company: GMA Entertainment TV

Original release
- Network: GMA Network
- Release: August 10 – November 27, 2015

Beautiful Strangers is a 2015 Philippine television drama series broadcast by GMA Network. Directed by Albert Langitan, it stars Heart Evangelista and Lovi Poe. It premiered on August 10, 2015, on the network's Telebabad line up. The series concluded on November 27, 2015, with a total of 80 episodes.

The series is streaming online on YouTube.

== Premise ==
The story revolves around Kristine and Joyce. Their lives intertwine when Kristine helps the homeless amnesiac Leah, which is Joyce who was sexually abused by Kristine's father. They become friends and will eventually find out the truth.

== Cast and characters ==
Cast

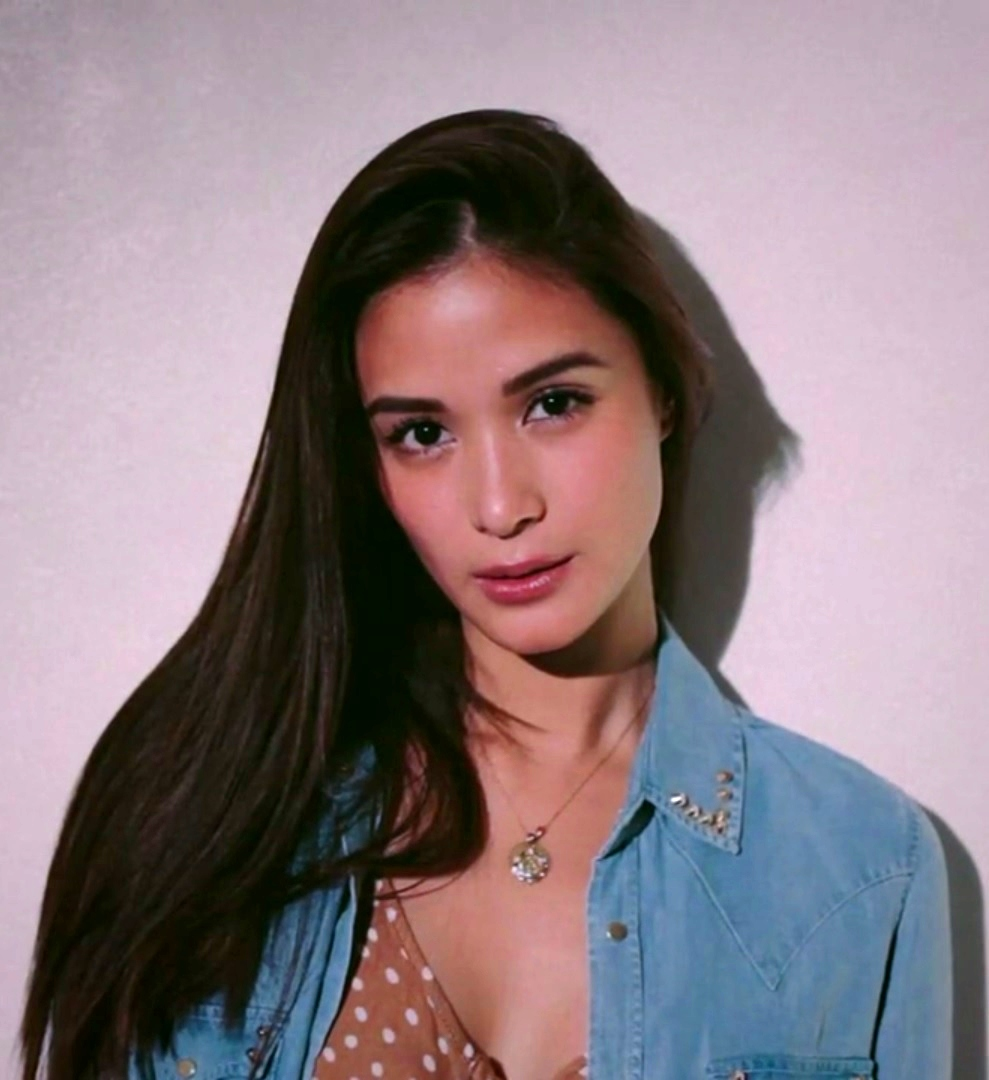
Heart Evangelista

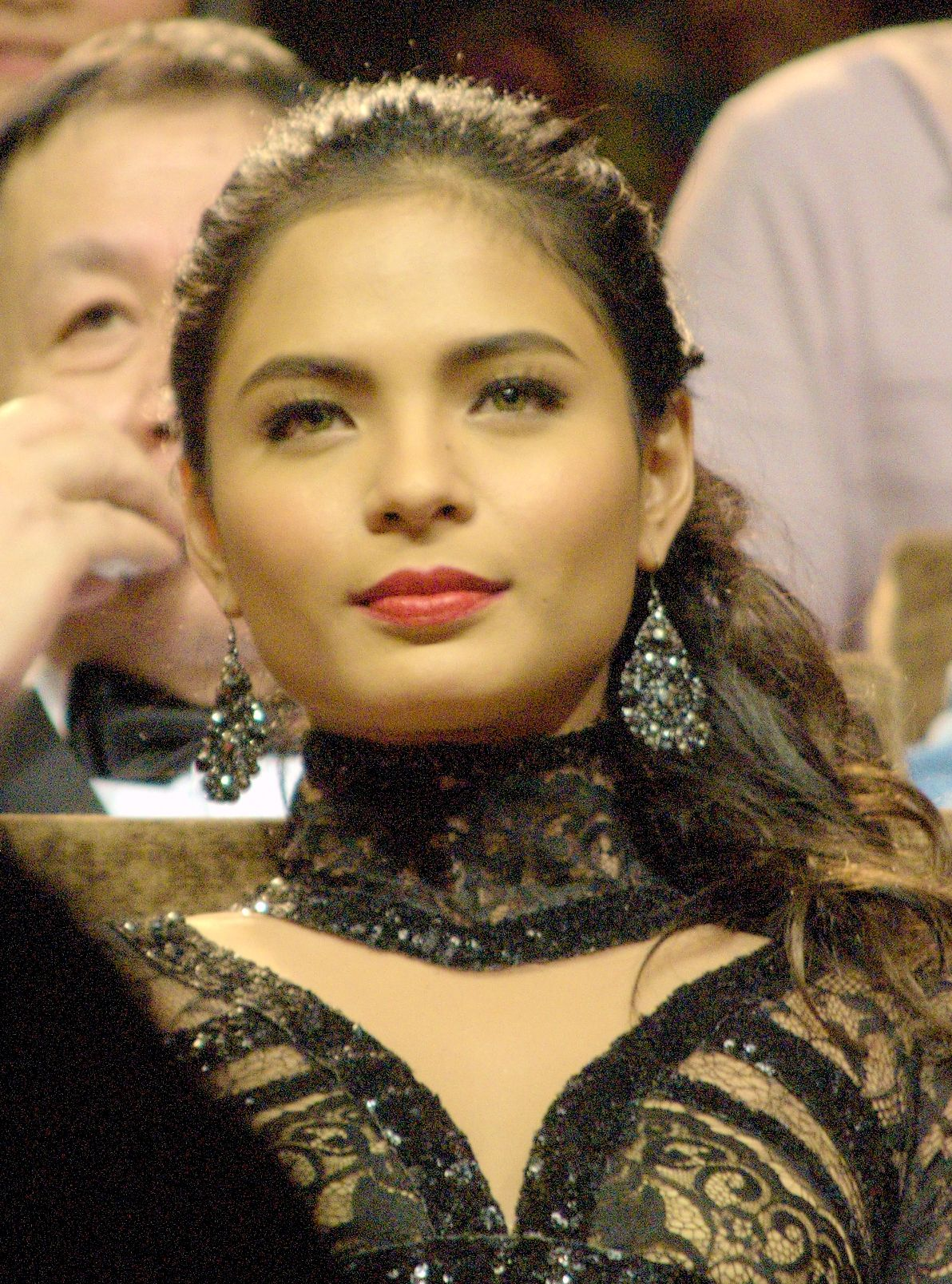
Lovi Poe

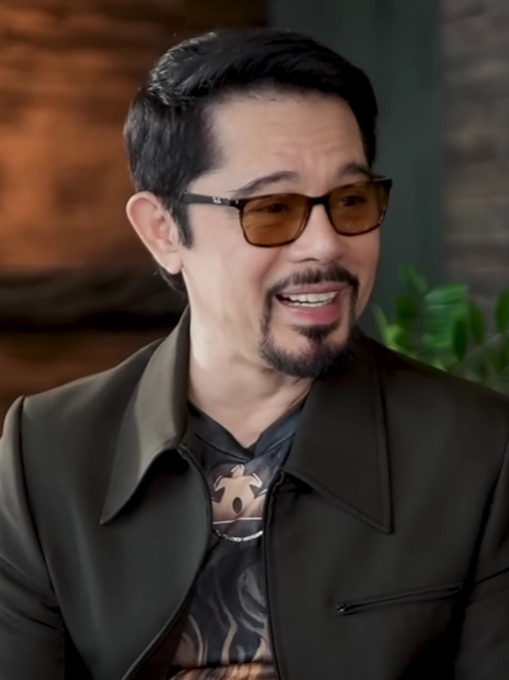
Christopher de Leon

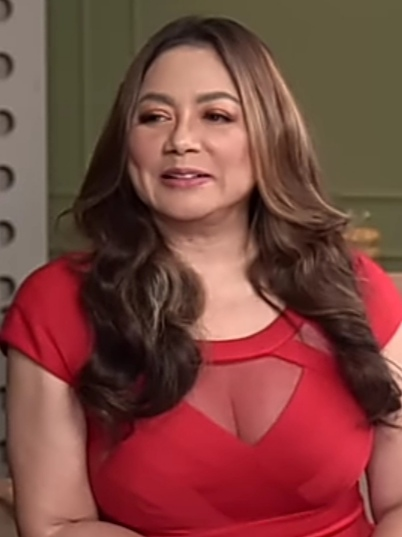
Dina Bonnevie

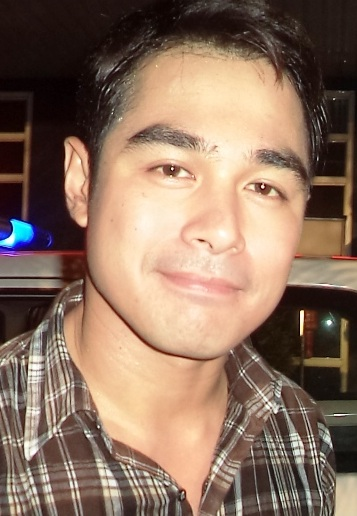
Benjamin Alves

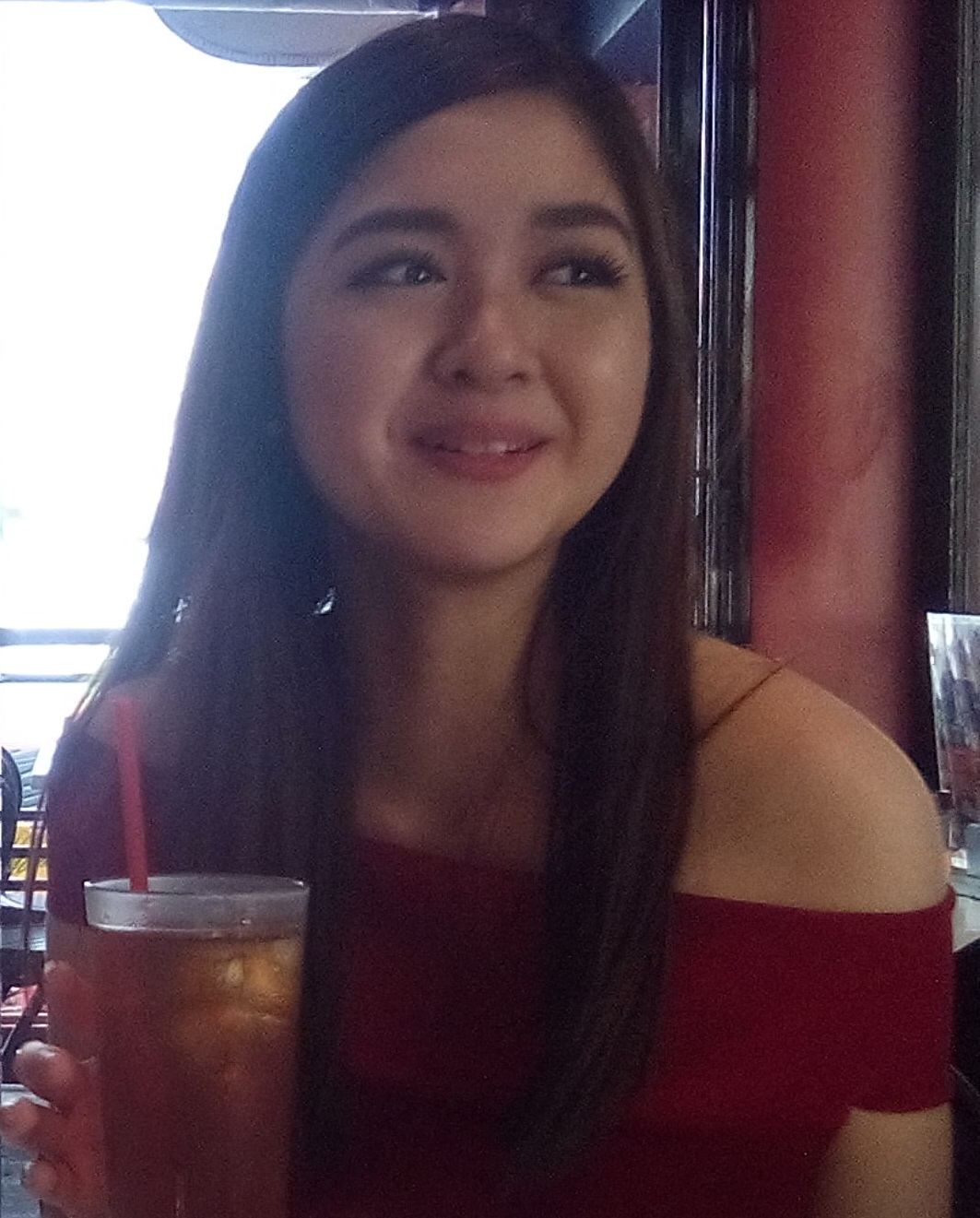
Mariel Pamintuan

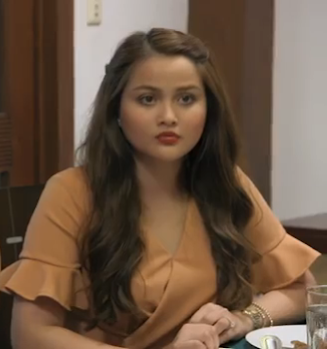
Dianne Medina

Lead cast

- Heart Evangelista as Kristine de Jesus Castillo-Ilagan
- Lovi Poe as Jocelyn "Joyce" Rodriguez-Castillo / Lea

Supporting cast

- Christopher de Leon as Ronaldo Castillo
- Dina Bonnevie as Alejandra Valdez-Castillo
- Rocco Nacino as Noel Ilagan
- Benjamin Alves as Lawrence "Lance" Castillo
- Emilio Garcia as Nestor Ilagan
- Kier Legaspi as Rigor Lacsamana
- Ayen Munji-Laurel as Lourdes de Jesus
- Lovely Rivero as Imelda Rodriguez
- Renz Valerio as Jason Rodriguez
- Mariel Pamintuan as Leslie de Jesus
- Gabriel de Leon as Rex Buenaventura
- Djanin Cruz as Hannah Mamaril
- Dianne Medina as Monica Aragon
- Nar Cabico as Shakira / Rodolfo Vicente
- Divina Valencia as Salve Valdez
- Rez Cortez as Mike Mamaril

Recurring cast

- Gabby Eigenmann as Isagani Mendoza
- Ervic Vijandre as Mark
- Diva Montelaba as Georgia Lacsamana

Guest cast

- Pen Medina as Andres Rodriguez
- Althea Ablan as younger Kristine
- Toby Alejar
- Rafa Siguion-Reyna
- Ozu Ong
- Bing Babao
- Robbie Sy
- Maimai Davao
- Rina Reyes
- Crispin Pineda
- Mike Magat
- Paolo Rivero
- Luz Fernandez

== Production ==
Principal photography commenced in July 2015.

== Ratings ==
According to AGB Nielsen Philippines' Mega Manila household television ratings, the pilot episode of Beautiful Strangers earned a 21.4% rating. The final episode scored a 21.7% rating. The series had its highest rating on September 10, 2015, with a 22.6% rating.

== Accolades ==
Accolades received by Beautiful Strangers
Year	Award	Category	Recipient	Result	Ref.
2016	30th PMPC Star Awards for Television	Best Drama Actress	Heart Evangelista	Nominated	
2016	30th PMPC Star Awards for Television	Best Drama Supporting Actor	Christopher de Leon	Nominated	
