= Battle of the Judges =

2023 Philippine television reality show

- Title card
- Genre: Reality competition
- Based on: La France a un incroyable talent: La Bataille Du Jury (2020)
- Directed by: Rico Gutierrez
- Presented by: Alden Richards
- Judges: Annette Gozon-Valdes; Boy Abunda; Bea Alonzo; Jose Manalo
- Country of origin: Philippines
- Original language: Tagalog
- No. of episodes: 12

Production
- Executive producer: Irene Pacana
- Camera setup: Multiple-camera setup
- Production company: GMA Entertainment Group

Original release
- Network: GMA Network
- Release: July 15 – September 30, 2023

Battle of the Judges is a 2023 Philippine television reality talent competition show broadcast by GMA Network. Directed by Rico Gutierrez, it is hosted by Alden Richards. It premiered on July 15, 2023 on the network's Sabado Star Power sa Gabi line-up. The show concluded on September 30, 2023, with a total of 12 episodes.

== Cast ==
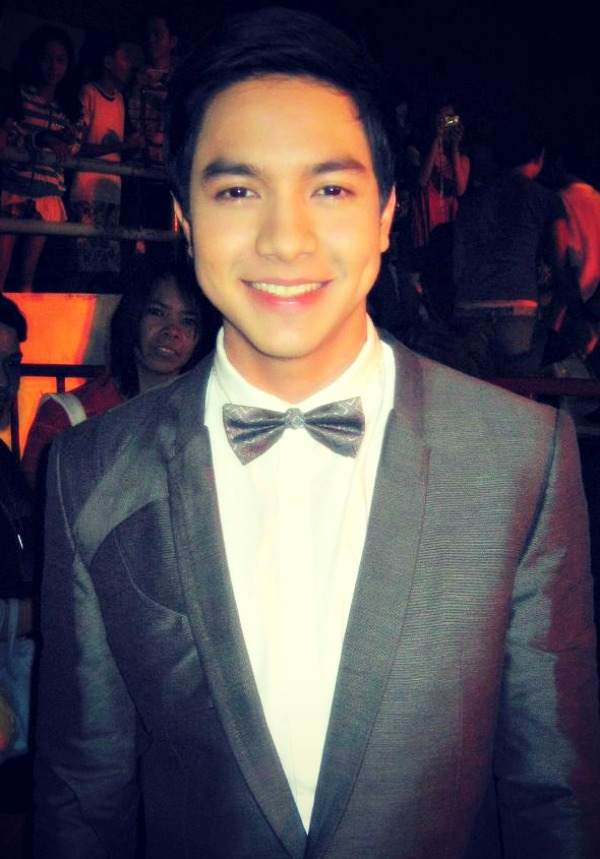
Alden Richards served as a host.

Host

- Alden Richards

Judges

- Annette Gozon-Valdes
- Boy Abunda
- Bea Alonzo
- Jose Manalo

== Format ==
This show is a spin-off of the Got Talent franchise. The format of the show is based on the French version of the show with the same name. The competition between judges begins as they mentor and prepare their squad members for the three levels of competition: Battle of the Best or the elimination round, is the thrilling encounter of 24 squad members who will fight it out in 12 Battles.

Battle to the Top is the semifinal round where the four judges will continue to guide the remaining 12 performers who will compete against each other in 6 battles in order to move forward to the final level, The Ultimate Battle, or the Championship round. Here, the remaining six performers will face each other to conquer the battle stage and be voted as the one and only ultimate champion of the competition, who will receive one million pesos.

== Teams ==
Judges

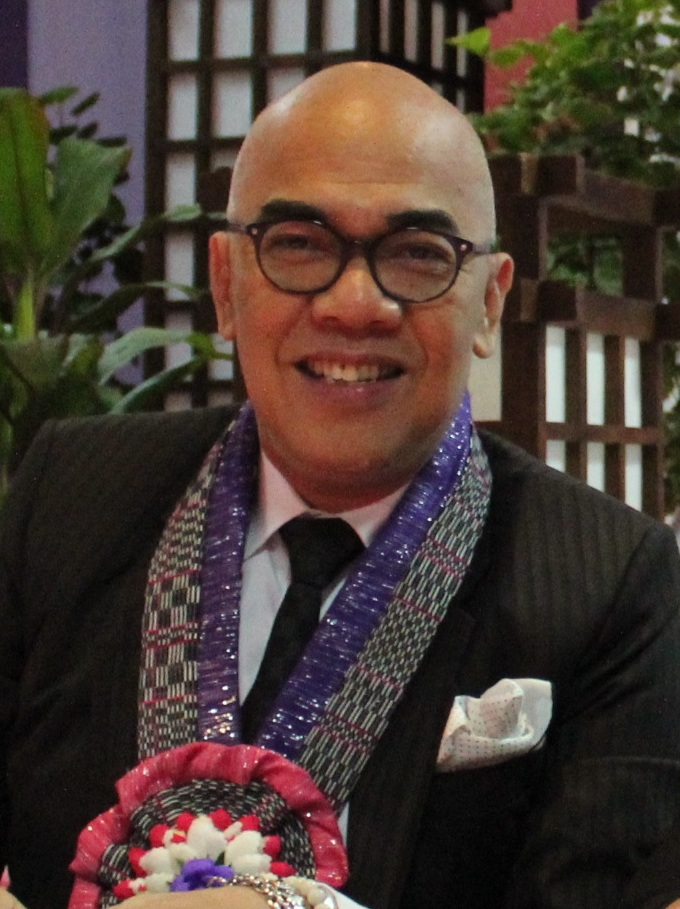
Boy Abunda

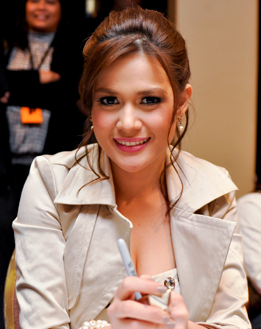
Bea Alonzo.

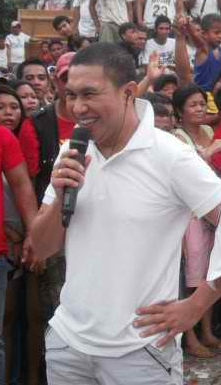
Jose Manalo

Color key

- Winner
- Runner-up
- Third place
- 4th-7th place
- Eliminated in the Wildcard
- Eliminated in the Battle to the Top
- Eliminated in the Battle of the Best
- Withdrew

Judges	24 squad members					
Boy Abunda						
Boy Abunda	Shammah	Kathy Hipolito Mas (Note: Won the toss coin tiebreaker.)	Brenan Espartinez	Clyde Basbas (Note: Lost the toss coin tiebreaker.)	Nocturnal Dance Company	Shaneya
Bea Alonzo						
Bea Alonzo	Joseph Erwin Valerio (Note: Chosen to be Moses Gozun's replacement.)	Amazing Duo	Jay-R Siaboc	Erwin Reyes	Moses Gozun (Note: Withdrew due to his competition in WCOPA 2023.)	Roni Mariano
Annette Gozon-Valdes						
Annette Gozon-Valdes	Power Impact Dancers	Ver5us	Vianna Ricafranca	Kendal Fabroa	Nomer Lasala	Shadow Arts Theater
Jose Manalo						
Jose Manalo	Marvin Peralta	JB Dela Cruz	Steps of Gold	Electro Groovers	Roxor Beat	Marlou Mangeron
Note: Italicized names are eliminated squad members who were selected by their judges to compete in the wildcard round.

== Battle of the Best ==
In this round, 24 squad members of the four judges will fight it out in 12 battles. The winner for each battle will be based on the votes of the two non-competing judges and 100 studio audience.

Color key

✔	Judges' and Audiences' Choice
	Squad member won the battle and advanced to the Battle to the Top
	Squad member lost the battle, but was picked by their judge to compete in the Wildcard
	Squad member lost the battle and was eliminated

=== Episode 1 (July 15) ===
Battle	Order	Team	Participant	Voting result				
Battle	Order	Team	Participant	Boy	Bea	Annette	Jose	Audience's vote
1	1	Boy Abunda	Nocturnal Dance Company	—N/a	✔	—N/a	–	✔
1	2	Annette Gozon-Valdes	Shadow Arts Theater	—N/a	–	—N/a	✔	–
2	1	Jose Manalo	Marlou Mangeron	–	—N/a	✔	—N/a	–
2	2	Bea Alonzo	Moses Gozun	✔	—N/a	–	—N/a	✔

=== Episode 2 (July 22) ===
Battle	Order	Team	Participant	Voting result				
Battle	Order	Team	Participant	Boy	Bea	Annette	Jose	Audience's vote
1	1	Jose Manalo	Electro Groovers	—N/a	✔	✔	—N/a	✔
1	2	Boy Abunda	Shaneya	—N/a	–	–	—N/a	–
2	1	Bea Alonzo	Jay-R Siaboc	–	—N/a	—N/a	–	–
2	2	Annette Gozon-Valdes	VER5US	✔	—N/a	—N/a	✔	✔

=== Episode 3 (July 29) ===
Battle	Order	Team	Participant	Voting result				
Battle	Order	Team	Participant	Boy	Bea	Annette	Jose	Audience's vote
1	1	Annette Gozon-Valdes	Nomer Lasala	—N/a	–	—N/a	–	–
1	2	Boy Abunda	Shammah	—N/a	✔	—N/a	✔	✔
2	1	Bea Alonzo	Amazing Duo	✔	—N/a	–	—N/a	✔
2	2	Jose Manalo	Roxor Beat	–	—N/a	✔	—N/a	–

=== Episode 4 (August 5) ===
Battle	Order	Team	Participant	Voting result				
Battle	Order	Team	Participant	Boy	Bea	Annette	Jose	Audience's vote
1	1	Annette Gozon-Valdes	Kendal Fabroa	✔	–	—N/a	—N/a	–
1	2	Jose Manalo	Marvin Peralta	–	✔	—N/a	—N/a	✔
2	1	Bea Alonzo	Roni Mariano	—N/a	—N/a	–	–	–
2	2	Boy Abunda	Kathy Hipolito Mas	—N/a	—N/a	✔	✔	✔

=== Episode 5 (August 12) ===
Battle	Order	Team	Participant	Voting result				
Battle	Order	Team	Participant	Boy	Bea	Annette	Jose	Audience's vote
1	1	Jose Manalo	Steps of Gold	–	–	—N/a	—N/a	–
1	2	Annette Gozon-Valdes	Vianna Ricafranca	✔	✔	—N/a	—N/a	✔
2	1	Boy Abunda	Clyde Basbas	—N/a	—N/a	✔	–	✔
2	2	Bea Alonzo	Joseph Erwin Valerio	—N/a	—N/a	–	✔	–

=== Episode 6 (August 19) ===
Battle	Order	Team	Participant	Voting result				
Battle	Order	Team	Participant	Boy	Bea	Annette	Jose	Audience's vote
1	1	Boy Abunda	Brenan Espartinez	—N/a	✔	–	—N/a	–
1	2	Jose Manalo	JB Dela Cruz	—N/a	–	✔	—N/a	✔
2	1	Annette Gozon-Valdes	Power Impact Dancers	✔	—N/a	—N/a	–	–
2	2	Bea Alonzo	Erwin Reyes	–	—N/a	—N/a	✔	✔

== Battle to the Top ==
In this semi-final round, 12 remaining squad members of the four judges will fight it out in 6 battles. The winner for each battle will be based on the votes of the two non-competing judges and 100 studio audience.

Color key

✔	Judges' and Audiences' Choice
	Squad member won the battle and advanced to the Ultimate Battle
	Squad member lost the battle and was eliminated

=== Episode 7 (August 26) ===
Joseph Erwin Valerio replaced Moses Gozun due to his competition in WCOPA 2023.

Battle	Order	Team	Participant	Voting result				
Battle	Order	Team	Participant	Boy	Bea	Annette	Jose	Audience's vote
1	1	Annette Gozon-Valdes	Vianna Ricafranca	-	-	—N/a	—N/a	-
1	2	Jose Manalo	JB Dela Cruz	✔	✔	—N/a	—N/a	✔
2	1	Boy Abunda	Nocturnal Dance Company	—N/a	—N/a	–	✔	-
2	2	Bea Alonzo	Joseph Erwin Valerio	—N/a	—N/a	✔	–	✔

=== Episode 8 (September 2) ===
Battle	Order	Team	Participant	Voting result				
Battle	Order	Team	Participant	Boy	Bea	Annette	Jose	Audience's vote
1	1	Bea Alonzo	Erwin Reyes	–	—N/a	–	—N/a	–
1	2	Jose Manalo	Marvin Peralta	✔	—N/a	✔	—N/a	✔
2	1	Annette Gozon-Valdes	VER5US	—N/a	–	—N/a	✔	–
2	2	Boy Abunda	Shammah	—N/a	✔	—N/a	–	✔

=== Episode 9 (September 9) ===
Battle	Order	Team	Participant	Voting result				
Battle	Order	Team	Participant	Boy	Bea	Annette	Jose	Audience's Vote
1	1	Boy Abunda	Kathy Hipolito Mas	✔ (Note: Judge Boy Abunda chose a toss coin to break the tie.)	–	✔	✔	–
1	2	Boy Abunda	Clyde Basbas	–	✔	–	–	✔
2	1	Jose Manalo	Electro Groovers	–	—N/a	–	—N/a	–
2	2	Bea Alonzo	Amazing Duo	✔	—N/a	✔	—N/a	✔

== Battle to the Top Wildcard Edition ==
In this wildcard round, 4 previously eliminated squad members of the four judges will return to fight it out in one battle and be part of the Ultimate Battle. The winner will be based on the voting of the judges and the studio audience. In this round, five battle stars will be given: four from the judges (with the judges aren't allowed to vote on their own squad member), and one from the studio audience. In the event of a tie, the studio audience will vote again to break the tie.

Color key

Squad member won the battle and advanced to the Ultimate Battle
Squad member lost the battle and was eliminated

=== Episode 10 (September 16) ===
Order	Team	Participant	Voting result				
Order	Team	Participant	Boy	Bea	Annette	Jose	Audience's vote
1	Annette Gozon-Valdes	Power Impact Dancers	✔	✔	—N/a		✔ (Note: Voted by the audience in a tiebreaker.)
2	Bea Alonzo	Jay-R Siaboc		—N/a			✔
3	Boy Abunda	Brenan Espartinez	—N/a		✔	✔	
4	Jose Manalo	Steps of Gold				—N/a	

== Ultimate Battle ==
In this 2-part final round, seven remaining squad members of the four judges will fight it out in one ultimate battle. The winner will be determined by the number of battle stars to be given by the judges and the studio audience.

Color key

- Winner
- Runner-up
- 3rd Place

=== Episode 11 (September 23) ===
Order	Team	Participant	Voting result						
Order	Team	Participant	Boy	Bea	Annette	Jose	Audience	Total Battle Stars Received	Placement
1	Annette Gozon-Valdes	Power Impact Dancers	–	21	—	–	–	89.05	Runner-up
2	Bea Alonzo	Joseph Erwin Valerio	–	—N/a	–	22	–	77	5th Place
3	Jose Manalo	JB Dela Cruz	–	–	–	—N/a	18.78	73.78	7th Place

=== Episode 12 (September 30) ===
Order	Team	Participant	Voting result						
Order	Team	Participant	Boy	Bea	Annette	Jose	Audience	Total Battle Stars Received	Placement
1	Boy Abunda	Shammah	—	–	–	–	21.54	86.54	3rd Place
2	Jose Manalo	Marvin Peralta	20	–	–	—	–	91.52	Winner
3	Boy Abunda	Kathy Hipolito Mas	—N/a	–	–	20	–	74.05	6th Place
4	Bea Alonzo	Amazing Duo	–	—N/a	18	–	–	84.4	4th Place

== Ratings ==
According to AGB Nielsen Philippines' Nationwide Urban Television Audience Measurement People in television homes, the pilot episode of Battle of the Judges earned an 11.8% rating.
