= List of Beautiful Strangers episodes =

Beautiful Strangers is a 2015 Philippine television drama series broadcast by GMA Network. It premiered on the network's Telebabad line up and worldwide on GMA Pinoy TV from August 10, 2015 to November 27, 2015, replacing Let the Love Begin.

Mega Manila ratings are provided by AGB Nielsen Philippines.

== Series overview ==
Month	Episodes	Monthly Averages
Month	Episodes	Mega Manila
August 2015	16	20.2%
September 2015	22	20.2%
October 2015	22	19.1%
November 2015	20	19.8%
Total	80	19.8%

== Episodes ==
=== August 2015 ===
Episode		Original air date	Social Media Hashtag	AGB Nielsen Mega Manila Households in Television Homes			Prod. Code	Ref.
Episode		Original air date	Social Media Hashtag	Rating	Timeslot Rank	Primetime Rank	Prod. Code	Ref.
1	Pilot	August 10, 2015	#BeautifulStrangers	21.4%	#2	#3	1001 - A	
2	Unang Pagkikita	August 11, 2015	#UnangPagkikita	20.6%	#2	#4	1002 - B	
3	Kristine at Joyce	August 12, 2015	#KristineAtJoyce	21.0%	#2	#3	1003 - C	
4	Pagsubok at Pangarap	August 13, 2015	#PagsubokAtPangarap	21.2%	#2	#4	1004 - D	
5	Pagmamahal ni Noel	August 14, 2015	#PagmamahalNiNoel	19.9%	#2	#4	1005 - E	
6	Pagkakamali ni Ronaldo	August 17, 2015	#PagkakamaliNiRonaldo	19.5%	#2	#5	1007 - G	
7	Utos ni Alejandra	August 18, 2015	#UtosNiAlejandra	19.5%	#2	#4	1006 - F	
8	Kristine at Noel	August 19, 2015	#KristineAtNoel	19.1%	#2	#6	1008 - H	
9	Half Sister ni Lawrence	August 20, 2015	#HalfSisterNiLawrence	19.9%	#2	#5	1009 - I	
10	Taong Grasa	August 21, 2015	#TaongGrasa	19.2%	#2	#6	1010 - J	
11	Muling Pagkikita	August 24, 2015	#MulingPagkikita	20.9%	#2	#4	1011 - K	
12	Joyce Saves Kristine	August 25, 2015	#JoyceSavesKristine	20.0%	#2	#4	1012 - L	
13	Totoong Damdamin	August 26, 2015	#BSTotoongDamdamin	20.4%	#2	#4	1013 - M	
14	Mukha ni Lea	August 27, 2015	#BSMukhaNiLea	20.3%	#2	#4	1014 - N	
15	Joyce Returns	August 28, 2015	#BSJoyceReturns	20.2%	#2	#4	1016 - P	
16	Painful Truth	August 31, 2015	#BSPainfulTruth	19.7%	#2	#5	1017 - Q	

=== September 2015 ===
Episode		Original air date	Social Media Hashtag	AGB Nielsen Mega Manila Households in Television Homes			ProdCode	Ref.
Episode		Original air date	Social Media Hashtag	Rating	Timeslot Rank	Primetime Rank	ProdCode	Ref.
17	Origami ni Joyce	September 1, 2015	#BSOrigamiNiJoyce	20.5%	#1	#3	1018 - R	
18	Muling Pagtatagpo	September 2, 2015	#BSMulingPagtatagpo	20.2%	#2	#4	1015 - O	
19	Alejandra vs. Lourdes	September 3, 2015	#BSAlejandraVsLourdes	19.7%	#2	#5	1019 - S	
20	Complicated Love	September 4, 2015	#BSComplicatedLove	20.3%	#2	#4	1020 - T	
21	Ang Pagtataksil	September 7, 2015	#BSAngPagtataksil	20.1%	#2	#4	1022 - V	
22	Hinala ni Kristine	September 8, 2015	#BSHinalaNiKristine	19.5%	#1	#3	1021 - U	
23	Confrontation	September 9, 2015	#BSConfrontation	20.8%	#2	#4	1023 - W	
24	Poot ni Kristine	September 10, 2015	#BSPootNiKristine	22.6%	#1	#3	1024 - X	
25	Galit ni Ronaldo	September 11, 2015	#BSGalitNiRonaldo	21.5%	#2	#4	1025 - Y	
26	Alejandra's Threat	September 14, 2015	#BSAlejandrasThreat	20.1%	#2	#4	1026 - Z	
27	Muling Paghaharap	September 15, 2015	#BSMulingPaghaharap	20.5%	#2	#4	1027 - AA	
28	Pagsabog ni Ronaldo	September 16, 2015	#BSPagsabogNiRonaldo	20.4%	#1	#3	1028 - BB	
29	The Truth	September 17, 2015	#BSTheTruth	20.4%	#2	#4	1029 - CC	
30	Tangka sa Buhay	September 18, 2015	#BSTangkaSaBuhay	20.4%	#2	#4	1030 - DD	
31	Lawrence's Proposal	September 21, 2015	#BSLawrencesProposal	20.3%	#2	#4	1031 - EE	
32	Away Pamilya	September 22, 2015	#BSAwayPamilya	17.7%	#2	#5	1032 - FF	
33	Masamang Plano	September 23, 2015	#BSMasamangPlano	20.6%	#2	#5	1033 - GG	
34	Pagbalik ng Alaala	September 24, 2015	#BSPagbalikNgAlaala	20.3%	#2	#6	1036 - JJ	
35	Rodriguez Castillo Wedding	September 25, 2015	#BSRodriguezCastilloWedding	20.3%	#2	#5	1034 - HH	
36	Para sa Katotohanan	September 28, 2015	#BSParaSaKatotohanan	18.3%	#2	#6	1035 - II	
37	Truth vs. Lie	September 29, 2015	#BSTruthVsLie	20.5%	#2	#5	1037 - KK	
38	Revenge Begins	September 30, 2015	#BSRevengeBegins	18.7%	#2	#5	1038 - LL	

=== October 2015 ===
Episode		Original air date	Social Media Hashtag	AGB Nielsen Mega Manila Households in Television Homes			ProdCode	Ref.
Episode		Original air date	Social Media Hashtag	Rating	Timeslot Rank	Primetime Rank	ProdCode	Ref.
39	Joyce Attacks Ronaldo	October 1, 2015	#BSJoyceAttacksRonaldo	20.5%	#2	#5	1039 - MM	
40	Galit ni Kristine	October 2, 2015	#BSGalitNiKristine	17.9%	#2	#5	1040 - NN	
41	Kristine and Joyce's Clash	October 5, 2015	#BSKristineJoyceClash	20.0%	#2	#6	1041 - OO	
42	Bintang kay Cristine	October 6, 2015	#BSBintangKayKristine	19.6%	#2	#6	1042 - PP	
43	Plano ni Ronaldo	October 7, 2015	#BSPlanoNiRonaldo	19.0%	#2	#4	1043 - QQ	
44	Confession	October 8, 2015	#BSConfession	19.3%	#2	#6	1044 - RR	
45	Kristine in Jail	October 9, 2015	#BSKristineInJail	19.5%	#2	#6	1046 - TT	
46	Alejandra's Jail Visit	October 12, 2015	#BSAlejandrasJailVisit	20.3%	#2	#5	1047 - UU	
47	Pagtakas	October 13, 2015	#BSPagtakas	20.1%	#2	#5	1045 - SS	
48	Atty. Gani	October 14, 2015	#BSAttyGani	20.3%	#2	#5	1048 - VV	
49	Bintang ni Kristine	October 15, 2015	#BSBintangNiKristine	18.3%	#2	#5	1050 - XX	
50	Noel in Danger	October 16, 2015	#BSNoelInDanger	20.0%	#2	#5	1049 - WW	
51	Panalong Panig	October 19, 2015	#BSPanalongPanig	18.4%	#2	#6	1052 - ZZ	
52	Sakripisyo ni Noel	October 20, 2015	#BSSakripisyoNiNoel	19.2%	#2	#5	1051 - YY	
53	Patient Lawrence	October 21, 2015	#BSPatientLawrence	16.5%	#2	#7	1053 - AAA	
54	Pangungulila	October 22, 2015	#BSPangungulila	17.4%	#2	#5	1054 - BBB	
55	Caught in the Act	October 23, 2015	#BSCaughtInTheAct	18.9%	#2	#5	1055 - CCC	
56	Muling Pagtutuos	October 26, 2015	#BSMulingPagtutuos	19.2%	#2	#5	1057 - EEE	
57	Hostage	October 27, 2015	#BSHostage	19.4%	#2	#5	1056 - DDD	
58	Ebidensya	October 28, 2015	#BSEbidensya	18.1%	#2	#5	1058 - FFF	
59	Rebelasyon	October 29, 2015	#BSRebelasyon	19.6%	#2	#5	1059 - GGG	
60	Babala ni Ronaldo	October 30, 2015	#BSBabalaNiRonaldo	19.5%	#2	#5	1060 - HHH	

=== November 2015 ===
Episode		Original air date	Social Media Hashtag	AGB Nielsen Mega Manila Households in Television Homes			ProdCode	Ref.
Episode		Original air date	Social Media Hashtag	Rating	Timeslot Rank	Primetime Rank	ProdCode	Ref.
61	Seeking the Truth	November 2, 2015	#BSSeekingTheTruth	20.0%	#2	#3	1061 - III	
62	Plano ni Joyce	November 3, 2015	#BSPlanoNiJoyce	21.5%	#2	#5	1062 - JJJ	
63	Losing Hope	November 4, 2015	#BSLosingHope	18.9%	#2	#5	1063 - KKK	
64	Reconcillation	November 5, 2015	#BSReconcillation	20.0%	#2	#5	1064 - LLL	
65	Selos ni Noel	November 6, 2015	#BSSelosNiNoel	19.6%	#2	#5	1065 - MMM	
66	Warning	November 9, 2015	#BSWarning	22.1%	#2	#4	1067 - OOO	
67	Demolition Job	November 10, 2015	#BSDemolitionJob	21.0%	#2	#5	1066 - NNN	
68	Hinala kay Joyce	November 11, 2015	#BSHinalaKayJoyce	20.6%	#2	#4	1068 - PPP	
69	Girl Fight	November 12, 2015	#BSGirlFight	20.8%	#2	#5	1069 - QQQ	
70	Sakripisyo ni Ronaldo	November 13, 2015	#BSSakripisyoNiRonaldo	19.7%	#2	#6	1070 - RRR	
71	Agreement	November 16, 2015	#BSAgreement	18.2%	#1	#6	1071 - SSS	
72	False Accusation	November 17, 2015	#BSFalseAccusation	18.2%	#1	#5	1072 - TTT	
73	Ronaldo's Worry	November 18, 2015	#BSRonaldosWorry	17.6%	#1	#6	1073 - UUU	
74	Secret Revealed	November 19, 2015	#BSSecretRevealed	18.0%	#1	#6	1074 - VVV	
75	Ang Paghihiganti	November 20, 2015	#BSAngPaghihiganti	21.1%	#1	#6	1075 - WWW	
76	Laban kay Alejandra	November 23, 2015	#BSLabanKayAlejandra	20.5%	#1	#6	1077 - YYY	
77	Hunt for Justice	November 24, 2015	#BSHuntForJustice	18.7%	#1	#6	1076 - XXX	
78	Desperate Moves	November 25, 2015	#BSDesperateMoves	19.4%	#1	#6	1078 - ZZZ	
79	Kristine and Joyce in Danger	November 26, 2015	#BSKristineJoyceInDanger	18.8%	#1	#5	1079 - a	
80	Finale	November 27, 2015	#BeautifulStrangersFinale	21.7%	#1	#4	1080 - b	
