= Nar Cabico =

Filipino singer, stage and TV actor

- Born: Russ Narcies Cabico; September 16, 1990 (age 35)
- Occupations: Actor, singer
- Years active: 2010–2019
- Agent: GMA Artist Center (2015–2019)

Russ Narcies "Nar" Cabico (born September 16, 1990) is a Filipino singer, stage and TV actor known after being the grand champion of GMA Network's singing contest, Superstar Duets.

== Career ==
Before entering showbiz, Cabico was already a theatre actor. The last stage play he did was "3 Stars and a Sun", wherein he sang music from the late Francis Magalona. He then appeared in the show Beautiful Strangers. In 2016, he became the first grand champion of the singing contest Superstar Duets.

In August 2026, He was announced as one of the artists to participate, as a composer and performer, for the Philippine Selection Night, the national selection for the Eurovision Song Contest Asia 2026, with his song "Chéri(e)" together with Elha Nympha, Esang de Torres and Lance Reblando.

== Filmography ==
=== Film ===
Year	Title	Role
2010	Rekrut	Uncredited
2011	Zombadings 1: Patayin sa Shokot si Remington	Georgia
2012	Kimmy Dora and the Temple of Kiyeme	Charito's uncle

=== Television ===
Year	Title	Role	Notes
2015	Beautiful Strangers	Rodolfo Vicente / Shakira	Supporting cast
2016	Encantadia	Banjo	Guest cast
2016	Superstar Duets	Himself	Winner Contestant
2016	Dear Uge	Emong	Episode Guest
2017	Full House Tonight	Himself	Co-host / Performer
2017	My Love from the Star	Jun	Supporting cast
2017	Magpakailanman	Georgie	Episode: "Pinay in the Happiest Place on Earth"
2017	All Star Videoke	Himself / Laglager	with Jennylyn Mercado
2018	The One That Got Away	Bonifacio "Bunny" Samson	Supporting cast
2018	Kapag Nahati ang Puso	Samson	Supporting cast
2019	Love You Two	Miguel "Migs" Borromeo	Supporting cast

== Discography ==
Year	Title	Album	Label
2016	Sumigaw, Umiglaw (with Betong Sumaya)	Various Artists – One Heart	GMA Records
2017	"GaGa" (single)	The One That Got Away soundtrack	GMA Records
2018	"Natapos Tayo" (single)		GMA Records
