= Pinoy Pop Superstar: The Finalists =

Compilation album by various artists
- Released: 2005
- Recorded: 2005
- Genre: Pop
- Label: GMA Records

Various artists chronology
Pinoy Pop Superstar: The Finalists (2005)	The Pinoy Pop Superstar Year 2 Grand Contenders' Album (2006)

Pinoy Pop Superstar: The Finalists is a compilation album released in 2005 featuring pop songs sung by the finalists of the first series of the Philippine TV show Pinoy Pop Superstar.

== Track listing ==
1. "My Miracle" (Raul Mitra) – The Finalists [4:57]
2. "If You're Not the One" (Daniel Bedingfield) – Micheal [4:10]
3. "If You Don't Know Me by Now" (Kenneth Gamble, Leon Huff) – Kristel [3:48]
4. "I Believe" (Louie Biancanieno, Tamyra Gray, Samuel Waters) – Charmaine [5:04]
5. "Home" (Brian McKnight) – Brenan [4:20]
6. "Through the Fire" (David Foster, Tom Keane, Cynthia Weils) – MC [4:41]
7. "It Might Be You" (Dave Grusin, Alan & Marilyn Bergman) – Jonalyn [5:09]
8. "My Miracle" (Minus One; Raul Mitra) – The Finalists [4:57]
