= Bryan Termulo =

Filipino actor and singer

- Also known as: Prince of Teleserye Themesongs
- Born: Bryan Bryll Cruz Termulo; March 8, 1988 (age 38); Bocaue, Bulacan, Philippines
- Genre: Pop
- Occupations: Actor; singer
- Years active: 2007–present
- Labels: BWB Records; GMA Records (2007–2011); GMA Artist Center (2007–2011); Star Music (2011–2015); Star Magic (2011–2015); Warner Music (2015–2017); Ivory Music and Video (2017–2022)
- Website: http://www.bryantermulo.com/

Bryan Bryll Cruz Termulo (born March 8, 1988) is a Filipino actor and award winning singer-songwriter, who was the runner-up in Pinoy Pop Superstar Year 3. He is best known for singing the theme song of Filipino TV series Walang Hanggan entitled "Dadalhin" and 100 Days to Heaven's "Bihag". He then gained the title "'Prince of Teleserye Themesongs'".

== Early life ==
Termulo was born on March 8, 1988, in Bocaue, Bulacan, the third of four children of Benigno Termulo of Bulacan and Ruth Cruz of Bagbag, Bauang, La Union. Yan, as he is fondly called, is very simple yet promising, vigorous and young at heart. He earned his high school diploma from Pulong Buhangin National High School in Santa Maria, Bulacan.

== Career ==
After Pinoy Pop Superstar Year 3 in GMA Network in 2007, he earned a silver medal in the World Championships of Performing Arts (WCOPA). He released his first album in 2010, entitled Begin. In December that year, his elder brother succumbed to dengue. Despite his sorrow, Termulo decided to pursue living and fulfilling his dreams. He pursued his college education and took up mass communication and later moved to communication arts. As part of his career move, he moved to ABS-CBN and became a part of Star Magic and was chosen to be a part of the all-boy group, Boys R Boys. In 2012, he released his second album Hanggang Ngayon. He has released digital recordings for Warner Music. He released his first single, "Mundong Imposible", with Maris Racal as the leading lady on the video. He recorded "I Can't Fight This Feeling", originally sung by REO Speedwagon. Then, he went to Ivory Music and he was able to record original Filipino music with "OPM" streamed in digital platforms. "Agwat" had 1.2 million streams on Spotify. "Taguan" was his second single on same label.

== Bryan XXV ==
In 2013, on the day after his 25th birthday, his first major concert took place at Music Museum entitled "BRYAN XXV", with guest performers Khen Magat, Bugoy Drilon, Angeline Quinto and KZ Tandingan.

== Discography ==
=== Albums ===
Album	Tracks	Year	Label	Certification
Begin'	1. Tangan Ka Pa; 2. Sayang Ang Bukas; 3. Danny Song; 4. In My Life; 5. Begin; 6. I Will; 7. Bihag; 8. Paano Nangyari; 9. More Today Than Yesterday; 10. Dapit Hapon	2010	BWB Records	
Hanggang Ngayon	1. Lagay Ng Puso; 2. Nasan Ka Na; 3. Kung Maibabalik; 4. Nagtatanong; 5. Aanhin Pa; 6. Hanggang Ngayon; Bonus tracks: 7. Dadalhin; 8. Pagdating Ng Panahon	2012	BWB Records	Gold

=== Television theme song ===
Year	Program title	Song title
2011	Ikaw Ay Pag-Ibig	"Tangan Ka Pa"
2011	100 Days to Heaven	"Bihag"
2011	100 Days to Heaven	"Paano Nangyari"
2012	Kung Ako'y Iiwan Mo	"Hanggang Ngayon"
2012	Ina, Kapatid, Anak	"Kailan"
2012	Walang Hanggan	"Dadalhin"
2012	Dahil Sa Pag-ibig	"Pagdating Ng Panahon"
2013	Juan Dela Cruz	"Sa Isang Sulyap Mo"
2014	Honesto	"Kung Maibabalik"
2014	Honesto	"Bakit Ba Ganyan"

=== Digital release ===
Year	Song title
2015	Mundong Imposible
2015	Erase Ka Na Sa Puso Ko
2016	Can't Fight This Feeling
2017	Agwat
2018	Taguan

== Filmography ==
=== Television ===
Year	Title	Role
2007	Pinoy Pop Superstar Year 3	Himself
2007–2010	SOP	Himself
2009	All My Life	Dino
2011–present	ASAP	Himself
2011–2012	Budoy	Ryan
2011	Wansapanataym: Cacai Kikay	Jeremy
2012	Wansapanataym: Hannah Panahon	Jeremy
2012	It's Showtime	Himself / Judge
2012	Maalaala Mo Kaya: Kabibe	Ronald
2013	Huwag Ka Lang Mawawala	Victor
2014–2016	Umagang Kay Ganda	Segment Host
2014	The Ryzza Mae Show	Himself
2014–2015	Dream Dad	Kenneth Sta. Maria
2015	The Ryzza Mae Show	Himself
2015	Eat Bulaga!	Himself / Performer
2016	Salamat Dok	Himself
