= Brenan Espartinez =

Filipino singer

- Born: Brenan Espartinez; February 18, 1986 (age 40); Pangasinan, Philippines
- Other name: Bren
- Occupations: Singer, actor
- Years active: 1991–present

Brenan Espartinez is a Filipino singer and former child actor.

== Music career ==
Brenan Espartinez started singing at an early age. He used to sing the theme song of Bayani, an educational show aired on ABS-CBN in the early 1990s. At age 15, he auditioned for Ryan Cayabyab who was in search of new singing talents. He passed the audition and became part of a pop group named Kaya, which consisted of Espartinez and three females (Shemara Fe Flatts, Ernestina Jacinto and Lougee Basabas). Kaya was under BMG Records (now named Sony Music) handled by Ryan Cayabyab, Rudy Tee and Boy Abunda.

Kaya had a total of four music videos; two videos of their own ("Oblivious" and "I Know"), one video they sang for a competition ("Tara Tena" with Kyla which won as JAM: Himig Handog Sa Makabagong Kabataan 2001's Song of the Year, Best R&B Song and Best R&B Performance) and one video they were featured on ("Radio Guy" sung by Ciudad). Kaya was nominated as Best New Band of the Year by MTV Pilipinas in 2001. After the group, Espartinez joined Pinoy Pop Superstar in 2004.

Espartinez worked with Hollywood's Bluetown Syndicate and one of SkeeTV's producers, Th8a a.k.a. Joe Fabio along with singer/songwriter Dianne Franc for his 5-track album entitled Unrestricted. The title track "Unrestricted" was the carrier single written by Franc and produced by Th8a for the album released in March 2013.

Espartinez released his self-titled album, Brenan under Bellhaus Entertainment. It features 8 tracks including a cover of the Side A song “Forevermore” and his first carrier single, “Di Nagpaalam”.

== Filmography ==
=== Television ===
- That's Entertainment (1991–1996)
- Sine'skwela (1994–2000)
- Lunch Break Muna (2002–2003)
- Pinoy Pop Superstar (1st runner-up; 2005)
- SOP Rules (2006–2010)
- Kemis Ke Misis Umaasa (2007)
- Party Pilipinas (2010–2013)
- It's Showtime (2014–2020)
- Battle of the Judges (2023)

== Discography ==
=== Albums ===
With Kaya

- Kaya (2000; Sony Music)

Singles:

  - "Oblivious"
  - "I Know"
  - "Don't Want to Live My Life (Without You)"

With Bluetown Syndicate

- Unrestricted (2013)

Singles:

  - "Unrestricted"

Solo album

- Brenan (2009; Universal Records)

Singles:

  - "'Di Nagpapaalam"
  - "I'm Yours and You're Mine"
  - "Ikaw"
  - "Mahal na Mahal Kita"
  - "Sineskwela"
  - "Bayani"
  - "Superstar" (featuring Thai VG)
