= Jona (album) =

Studio album by Jona
- Released: March 3, 2017
- Recorded: 2016–2017
- Genre: Pop; soul; R&B
- Language: English, Filipino
- Label: Star Music

Jona chronology
Jonalyn Viray (2013)	Jona (2017)

Singles from Jona
- 1. "Maghihintay Ako"; 2. "You"; 3. "Ano Nga Ba Tayo?"; 4. "Pusong Ligaw"; 5. "Till the End of Time"; 6. "Last Message"; 7. "Sampu"; 8. "Matibay feat. Regine Velasquez"

Jona is the second studio album by Filipino singer Jona. It is her first album released under Star Music Philippines. The twelve-track album features collaborations with Regine Velasquez on the song "Matibay" and with the newly formed BoyBand PH for "Till the End of Time". Jona also recorded Basil Valdez's "You" and Jericho Rosales' "Pusong Ligaw" for the album. Also included is the hit song "Maghihintay Ako." The album became available for streaming on Spotify on February 27, 2017, music stores on March 3, 2017, and on iTunes on March 4, 2017. It received double certifications of Gold and Platinum record.

== Singles ==
Maghihintay Ako served as the first successful single. "Ano Nga Ba Tayo" served as the lead and second single from the album. It was written by Kiko Salazar. The music video of the song was directed by Giselle Andre, it was posted on Star Music Philippines' official YouTube Channel on March 26, 2017, the day of its release.

== Track listing ==
No.	Title	Length
1.	"Ano? Bakit? Paano?"	4:02
2.	"You"	4:27
3.	"I'll Never Love This Way Again"	4:25
4.	"Ano Nga Ba Tayo?"	4:11
5.	"Pusong Ligaw"	4:27
6.	"Last Message"	4:22
7.	"Matibay" (featuring Regine Velasquez)	4:08
8.	"Maghihintay Ako"	3:48
9.	"Till the End of Time"	4:28
10.	"Ano? Bakit? Paano?" (cinematic version)	4:20
11.	"Till the End of Time" (featuring Boyband PH)	4:26
12.	"I'll Never Love This Way Again" (featuring Gary Valenciano)	4:02
