= Jona Viray =

Filipino singer (born 1989)

Jona
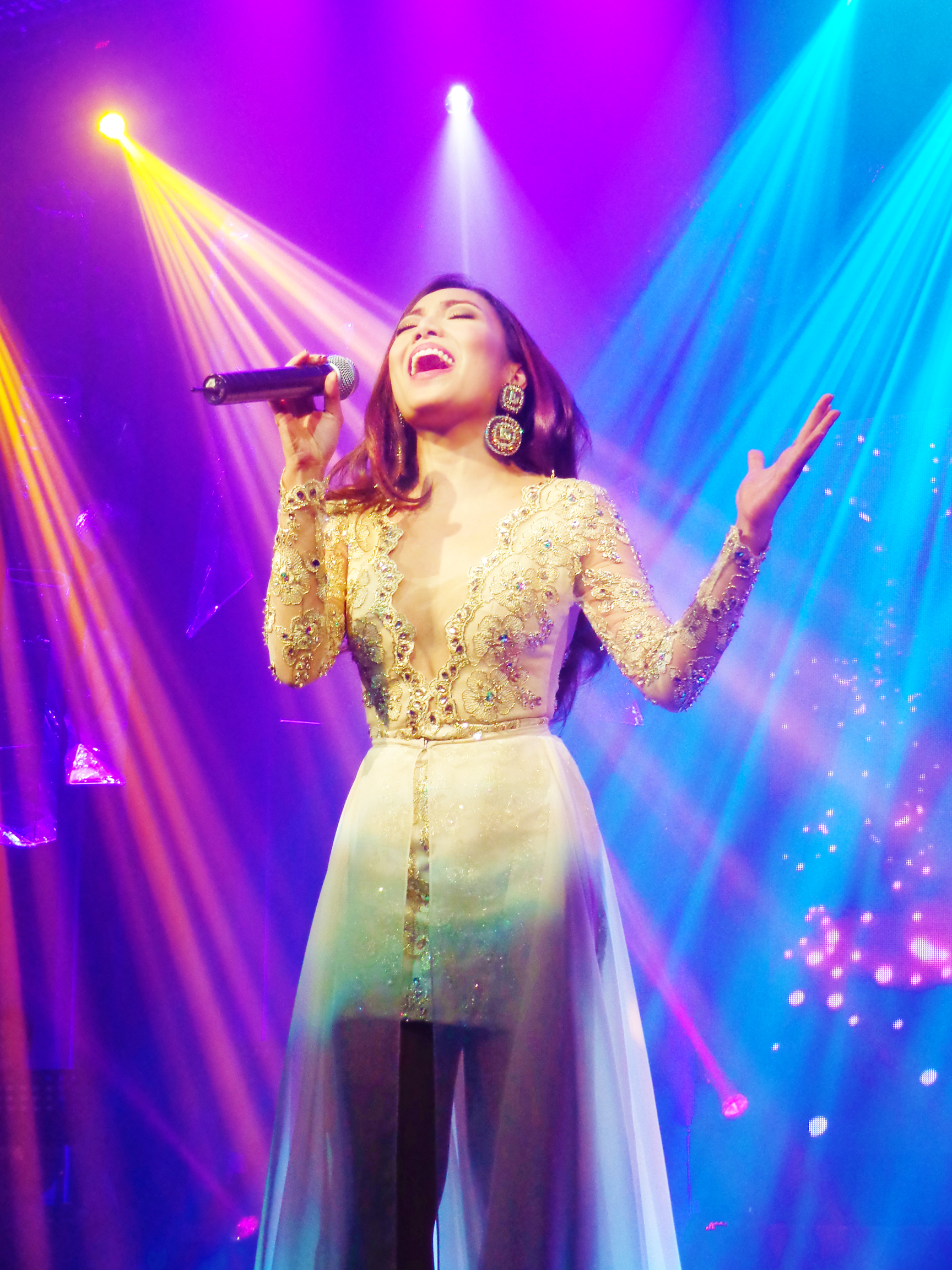
- Jona in 2013
- Born: Jonalyn Roxas Viray; November 15, 1989 (age 36); Marikina, Philippines
- Education: University of Santo Tomas Conservatory of Music
- Occupations: Singer, songwriter
- Years active: 1995–present
- Agent(s): GMA Artist Center (2004–2016); Star Magic (2016–2023); Viva Artists Agency (2023–present)
- Musical career
- Origin: Pio Duran, Albay, Philippines
- Genres: Pop, R&B, soul, classical
- Instrument: Vocals
- Labels: GMA Records; Creative Media Entertainment; Star Music
- Website: YouTube channel

Jonalyn Roxas Viray (born November 15, 1989), known mononymously as Jona, is a Filipino singer and songwriter. She gained recognition after winning Pinoy Pop Superstar. She was previously the lead singer of trio girl-group La Diva. Following the group's disbandment, she released her single "Help Me Get Over" which was awarded the Song of the Year Award at the 6th PMPC Star Awards for Music. In February 2016 she changed her screen name to Jona. She has won several awards, both solo and as member of La Diva. She is known for her belting technique, melismatic singing style, and her ability to sing operatic arias.

== Early life and career ==
=== Early life ===
Jonalyn Roxas Viray was born on November 15, 1989. She is the only girl and the eldest of four children from Pio Duran, Albay. In a 2025 interview with Toni Gonzaga, Jona disclosed that she experienced sexual abuse by her father at the age of ten.

Jona started joining singing contests at an early age. She won first runner-up in Birit Bulilit of IBC as a child and one of the finalists in MTB Teen Pop Star of ABS-CBN's Magandang Tanghali Bayan where her winning piece was Mariah Carey's "Never Too Far". She also sang Regine Velasquez's version of "I Don't Want to Miss a Thing" on Batang Vidaylin of ABC in 2000.

Jona was 15 years old when she competed in the singing competition Pinoy Pop Superstar on GMA Network. She emerged as the weekly champion after singing the Whitney Houston hit song "Run to You". She also sang "Reflection", "I Have Nothing" and "Never Too Far" in the weeks that follow, and after four consecutive weeks of being weekly champion, she qualified for the grand finals. For winning the title of Pinoy Pop Superstar, Jona won ₱1 million in cash and became the owner of a Futura Classic house and lot developed by Filinvest and a brand-new Toyota Innova. She also won an exclusive one-year contract with GMA Records, the recording arm of GMA Network, and received ₱100,000 (equivalent to ₱176,729 in 2021) worth of Belo Medical services, plus gift certificates worth ₱150,000 (equivalent to ₱265,094 in 2021) from Gandang Ricky Reyes.

=== Transfer to ABS-CBN ===
In February 2016, Jona ended her decade of exclusivity with GMA and transferred to rival network ABS-CBN. Part of her reintroduction was the changing of her screen name to Jona. Her earliest project in the Kapamilya Network saw her competing in the 2016 edition of Himig Handog, a songwriting and music video competition and also singing "I Will Survive", the theme song of primetime drama series, We Will Survive.

From then on she has sung several theme songs for ABS-CBN films and drama series, became a mainstay of the longest noontime musical variety show ASAP, released her first album under Star Music which achieved Gold and Platinum certifications, held two major concerts, and competed and won second place in Himig Handog 2017. On the 31st Awit Award, Jona won 6 awards, Most Downloaded Artist, Most Streamed Artist, Most Downloaded Song for "You", Most Streamed Song for "Pusong Ligaw", People's Voice for Favorite Collaboration for "Till the End of Time" with BoybandPH and Best Selling Album of the Year for self-titled album "Jona". Her collaboration with Regine Velasquez, "Matibay", also won Best Musical Arrangement award for composer Marvin Querido.

=== ASAP Birit Queens ===
On May 15, 2016, ASAP launched a group called the ASAP Birit Queens. The group is composed of Jona, Morissette, Angeline Quinto and Klarisse de Guzman. The group held a concert on March 31, 2017, at the Mall of Asia Arena.

The group temporarily disbanded in late 2017 but has since reunited occasionally.

On the launch of the Billboard Philippines, three of Jona's songs charted in Billboard Philippines Top 20: "Pusong Ligaw" and "Maghihintay Ako" charted at number 3 and number 4 respectively, and "You" charted at number 9. She performed at the 27th Asian Television Awards that included a cover of "Somewhere Over The Rainbow" a rendition of "The Magic Flute "Queen of the Night aria" ("Der Hölle Rache kocht in meinem Herzen"). On the artist's night, she performed "Love Don't Cost A Thing", "Into the Unknown", "Fifth Element Aria" and her own song "Till the End of Time". She also headlined the YouTube Music Night for Southeast Asia in 2021.

== Artistry ==
=== Influences ===
Jona has said that from childhood she has been influenced by Regine Velasquez, Céline Dion, and Mariah Carey for her musical style, and sound. She also admires to Aretha Franklin, Barbra Streisand, Beyoncé, Christina Aguilera, Etta James, Stevie Wonder, Michael Jackson, Whitney Houston, and Sam Smith.

=== Voice and timbre ===
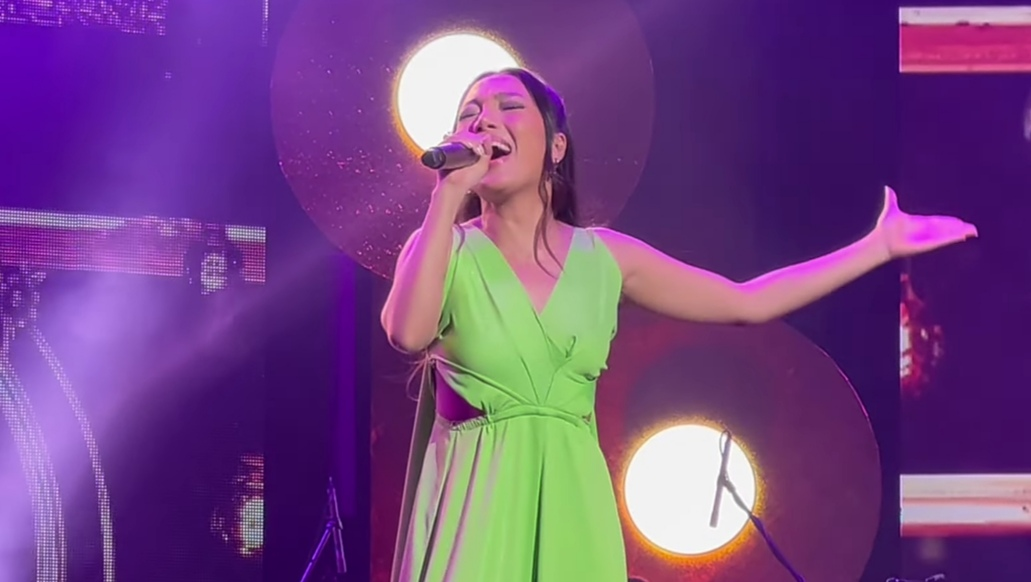
Jona performing at the Newport Performing Arts Theater, Pasay, in 2022

Jona has been noted for her "melismatic singing style" or use of melodic variations. Her voice has been described "soulful" and "powerful". She is a classically trained artist from the UST Conservatory of Music with a major in classical voice. Critics often lists her among the Top Filipino singers in the world alongside music icons like Lea Salonga for "her powerful vocals and her ability to convey raw emotion through her performances" and has been referred to as the Philippines' "Soul Princess" for her vocal talent.

=== Musical Style ===
Love is the subject for the vast majority of Jona's music. She is also known for her power ballads which deals with themes of heartbreak, hope, and perseverance.

== Personal life and advocacy ==
Jona, being the eldest child, is a breadwinner of her family.

Aside from her musical career, Jona is an animal welfare advocate and rescuer. In 2020, amidst the COVID-19 pandemic, she built her private animal sanctuary in Tanay, Rizal, which serves as a home to over 70 rescued dogs and cats as of 2025.

== Discography ==
Studio albums

- On My Own (2005)
- Jona (2017)

Extended plays

- Jonalyn Viray (2013)

== Concerts ==
List of concerts, with dates, venues and number of performances
Title	Date	Venue	Notes
Jonalyn: Uncovered	February 11, 2011	Bagaberde Grill and Bar	• 24th Aliw Awards Best Performer in Hotels, Music Lounges, Bars (Female)
Beyond Limits	September 2, 2011	Music Museum	• Co-headlined with Julie Anne San Jose and Frencheska Farr.
One Love	February 15, 2012	Metrobar	• Nominated for Best Concert Performer - Female at the 25th Aliw Awards.
Fearless	February 28, 2014	Music Museum	• 26th Aliw Awards Best Female Performer in a Concert.
Journey Into My Heart	November 27, 2015	Music Museum	• Guest performers includes Ice Seguerra, Kyla, Tres Marias, and The Angelos.
Queen of the Night: Jona	November 25, 2016	Kia Theater	• Nominated for Best Major Concert Performer - Female at the 30th Aliw Awards.
ASAP Birit Queens	March 31, 2017	Mall of Asia Arena	• Co-headlined with Angeline Quinto, Morissette and Klarisse de Guzman.
Prima Jona	November 18, 2017	The Theater at Solaire	• Guest performers includes Regine Velasquez and Arman Ferrer.
Love, Jona	March 30, 2019	Online	• YouTube Music Night free online concert].
The Aces	March 30, 2019	Smart Araneta Coliseum	• Co-headlined with Lani Misalucha and Darren Espanto.
Jona: Journey to the Arena, 20th Anniversary Concert	October 10, 2025	SM Mall of Asia Arena	• First major solo concert in one of the biggest venues in the Philippines. Guests include Regine Velasquez, Lani Misalucha, Zsa Zsa Padilla, Alamat, and former members of La Diva Maricris Garcia and Aicelle Santos whom she was a part of.

== Television appearances ==
Year	Title	Notes
1996	Birit Bulilit	Herself
2004	MTB Teen Popstar	Herself
2004—2005	Pinoy Pop Superstar	Herself
2005—2010	SOP	Herself
2005	My Guardian Abby	Herself
2006	I Luv NY	Jenny de Castro
2010—2013	Party Pilipinas	Herself
2012	My Daddy Dearest	Guest Singer
2013—2015	Sunday All Stars	Herself
2013	Walang Tulugan with the Master Showman	Guest
2013	Kahit Nasaan Ka Man	Herself
2014	Cattleya	Herself
2015	Sarap Diva	Herself
2015—2016	Marimar	Real Ate Corazón
2016–present	ASAP	Herself
2017	Magandang Buhay	Herself
2018	I Can See Your Voice	Herself
2023–present	Tawag ng Tanghalan	Hurado
2025	Your Face Sounds Familiar (season 4)	Round 6 guest performer as Mariah Carey

== Accolades ==
Awards and nominations received by Jona
Award	Year (Note: Indicates the year of ceremony. Each year is linked to the article about the awards held that year, wherever possible.)	Recipient(s)	Category	Result	Ref(s)
Aliw Awards	2011	Jonalyn Uncovered	Best Performance by a Female in Hotel Lounges and Bars	Won	
Aliw Awards	2012	One Love	Best Performance in a Concert (Female)	Nominated	
Aliw Awards	2014	Dares to be Fearless	Best Performance in A Concert (Female)	Won	
Aliw Awards	2017	Queen of the Night	Best Major Concert (Female)	Nominated	
Aliw Awards	2025	Journey to Arena	Best Female Artist in a Major Concert	Nominated	
Aliw Awards	2025	Jona	Best Female Artist	Won	
Aliw Awards	2025	Jona	Entertainer of the Year	Won	
Awit Awards	2018	"Sampu"	Best Performance by Female Recording Artist	Won	
Awit Awards	2018	"Till the End of Time"	Best Collaboration	Won	
Awit Awards	2018	"You"	Most Downloaded Song	Won	
Awit Awards	2018	"Pusong Ligaw"	Most Streamed Song	Won	
Awit Awards	2018	Jona	Most Downloaded Artist	Won	
Awit Awards	2018	Jona	Most Streamed Artist	Won	
Awit Awards	2018	Jona	Best Selling Album of the Year	Won	
Awit Awards	2019	"Take It To Forever"	Best R&B Performance	Won	
ASOP Music Festival	2013	"Ikaw"	Song of the Year	Won	
Box Office Entertainment Awards	2018	Birit Queens	Most Promising Female Concert Artist of the Year	Won	
MOR Pinoy Music Awards	2017	"Maghihintay Ako"	Song of the Year	Won	
Myx Music Awards	2017	"I'll Never Love This Way Again"	Favorite Remake	Nominated	
Myx Music Awards	2018	"Ano Nga Ba Tayo?"	Song of the Year"	Nominated	
Myx Music Awards	2018	Jona	Female Artist of the Year	Nominated	
Myx Music Awards	2018	"Til the End of Time"	Collaboration of the Year	Nominated	
Myx Music Awards	2018	"Pusong Ligaw"	Media Soundtrack of the Year	Nominated	
Myx Music Awards	2019	"Take it to Forever" (Note: with Jay R)	Collaboration of the Year	Nominated	
Star Awards for Music	2014	"Help Me Get Over You"	Song of the Year	Won	
Star Awards for Music	2016	"Naghihintay"	Song of the Year	Nominated	
Star Awards for Music	2017	Jona	Female Recording Artist of the Year	Nominated	
Star Awards for Music	2017	Jona	Album of the Year	Nominated	
Star Awards for Music	2017	Jona	Female Artist of the Year	Nominated	
Star Awards for Music	2017	Queen of The Night Jona	Female Performer of the Year	Nominated	
Star Awards for Music	2017	Birit Queens (Note: with Angeline Quinto, Morissette, & Klarisse de Guzman)	Concert of the Year	Won	
Star Awards for Music	2018	"Sampu"	Song of the Year	Nominated	
Star Awards for Music	2018	"Sampu"	Female Recording Artist of the Year	Nominated	
Star Awards for Music	2018	Prima Jona	Concert of the Year	Nominated	
Star Awards for Music	2018	Prima Jona	Female Concert Performer of the Year	Nominated	
Star Awards for Music	2019	"Ngayon at Kailanman"	Female Recording Artist of the Year	Nominated	
Star Awards for Music	2019	"Ngayon at Kailanman"	Revival Recording of the Year	Nominated	
Wish 107.5 Music Awards	2018	"Ano Nga Ba Tayo"	Ballad Song of the Year	Won	
World Championship of the Performing Arts	2006	Jona	Industry Award For Female Solo	Gold	
World Championship of the Performing Arts	2006	Jona	Gold Medal for Broadway	Gold	
World Championship of the Performing Arts	2006	"Close to Where You Are"	Gold Medal for Original Song	Gold	
World Championship of the Performing Arts	2006	Jona	Gold Medal for Pop	Gold	
World Championship of the Performing Arts	2006	Jona	Gold Medal for R&B/Jazz	Gold	
World Championship of the Performing Arts	2006	Jona	Gold Medal for Variety	Gold	
World Championship of the Performing Arts	2006	"Close To Where You Are"	Overall Champion for Female Vocal Solo (Original)	Gold	
World Championship of the Performing Arts	2006	Jona	Overall Champion for Female Vocal Solo (Broadway)	Gold	
World Championship of the Performing Arts	2006	Jona	Overall Champion Female Vocal Solo (Pop)	Gold	
World Championship of the Performing Arts	2006	Jona	Gold Medal for Best Pop Duet (Note: with Brenan Espartinez))	Gold	
World Championship of the Performing Arts	2006	Jona	Gold Medal for Best R&B/Jazz Duet (Note: with Brenan Espartinez)	Gold	
World Championship of the Performing Arts	2006	Jona	Vocal Duet Industry Award	Gold	
World Championship of the Performing Arts	2006	Jona	Overall Champion for Best Duet (Broadway)	Gold	
World Championship of the Performing Arts	2006	Jona	Overall Champion for Best Duet (Pop)	Gold	
World Championship of the Performing Arts	2006	Jona	Overall Champion for Best Duet (Gospel)	Gold	
