= Pinoy Pop Superstar =

Philippine television reality show

- Title card
- Genre: Reality competition
- Presented by: Regine Velasquez
- Judges: Jaya; Floy Quintos; Danny Tan
- Country of origin: Philippines
- Original language: Tagalog
- No. of seasons: 3

Production
- Camera setup: Multiple-camera setup
- Running time: 60 minutes
- Production company: GMA Entertainment TV

Original release
- Network: GMA Network
- Release: July 3, 2004 – June 2, 2007

Pinoy Pop Superstar (transl. Filipino pop superstar) is a Philippine television reality competition show broadcast by GMA Network. Hosted by Regine Velasquez, it premiered on July 3, 2004. The show concluded on June 2, 2007, with a total of three seasons.

== Seasons ==
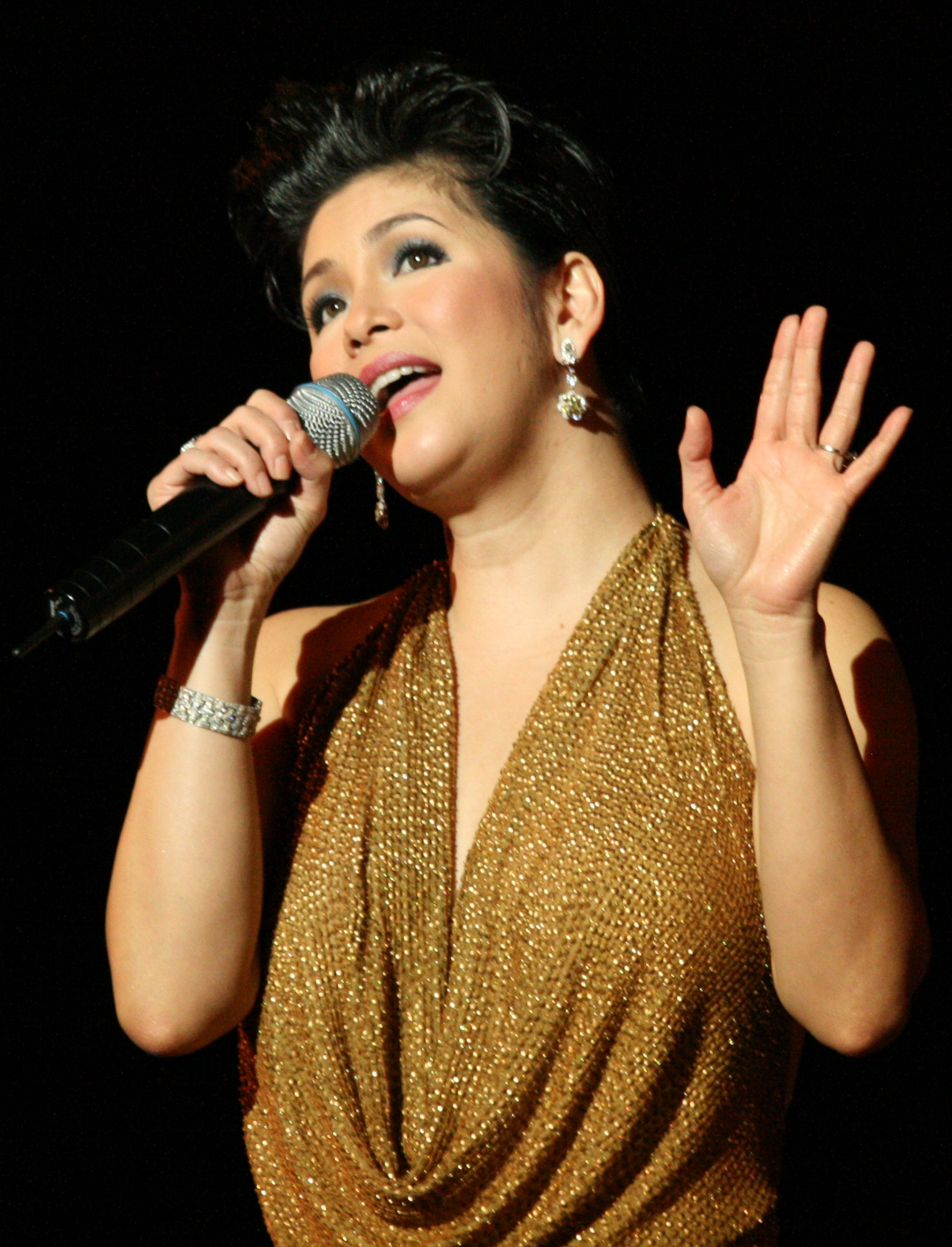
Regine Velasquez serves as the host.

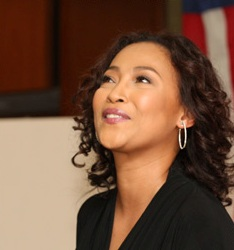
Jaya serves as a judge.

Seasons of Pinoy Pop Superstar
Season	Premiere	Finale	Grand champion	Runner-up	Final four	Grand contenders
1	July 3, 2004	May 7, 2005	Jonalyn Viray	Brenan Espartinez	Michael Anthony Garcia Charmaine Piamonte	Kristel Arianne Astor MC Monterola Sheila Ferrari Philbert de Torres
2	July 2, 2005	May 6, 2006	Gerald Santos	Aicelle Santos	Denver Regencia Harry Santos	Irra Cenina Elise Estrada Rosemarie Tan
3	July 1, 2006	June 2, 2007	Maricris Garcia	Bryan Termulo	Miguel Naranjilla Joyce Tanaña	Jennie Escalada Marvin Gagarin John Louie Abaigar April delos Santos Jae Buensuceso

== Contestants ==
Season 1

- Michael Garcia
- Kristel Astor
- Charmaine Piamonte
- MC Monterola
- Brenan Espartinez
- Jonalyn Viray
- Philbert de Torres from Canada
- Sheila Ferrari from the United States

Season 2

- Harry Santos
- Gerald Santos
- Aicelle Santos
- Denver Regencia
- Irra Cenina
- Ronnie Liang
- Daryl Ong
- Elise Estrada from Canada
- Rosemarie Tan from the United States

Season 3

- Joyce Tanaña
- Miguel Naranjilla
- Maricris Garcia
- Jennie Escalada
- Marvin Gagarin
- Bryan Termulo
- John Louie Abaigar
- April delos Santos
- Jae Buensuceso from the United States

== Accolades ==
Accolades received by Pinoy Pop Superstar
Year	Award	Category	Recipient	Result	Ref.
2006	20th PMPC Star Awards for Television	Best Talent Search Program Host	Regine Velasquez	Won	
2007	21st PMPC Star Awards for Television	Best Talent Search Program	Pinoy Pop Superstar	Nominated	
2007	21st PMPC Star Awards for Television	Best Talent Search Program Host	Regine Velasquez	Nominated	

== See also ==
- Pinoy Pop Superstar: The Finalists
