= Rivermaya discography =

Artist discography

- Studio albums: 10
- Singles: 48

This is the discography of OPM band Rivermaya.

== Albums ==
=== Studio albums ===
Title	Album details	Certifications (sales thresholds)
RiverMaya	Released: November 1994; Label: BMG Records (Pilipinas), Inc.; Formats: CD, cassette (CS)	PARI: 3× Platinum
Trip	Released: February 14, 1996; Label: BMG Records (Pilipinas), Inc.; Formats: CD, cassette (CS)	PARI: 4× Platinum
Atomic Bomb	Released: January 31, 1997; Label: BMG Records (Pilipinas), Inc.; Formats: CD, cassette (CS)	
It's Not Easy Being Green	Released: January 14, 1999; Label: BMG Records (Pilipinas), Inc.; Formats: CD, cassette (CS)	
Free	Released: August 30, 2000; Label: Self-released; Formats: CD	
Tuloy ang Ligaya	Released: October 15, 2001; Label: VIVA Records; Formats: CD, cassette (CS)	
Between the Stars and Waves	Released: October 10, 2003; Label: VIVA Records; Formats: CD, cassette (CS)	
Isang Ugat, Isang Dugo	Released: October 10, 2006; Label: VIVA Records; Formats: CD	
Buhay	Released: January 21, 2008; Label: Warner Music; Formats: CD	
Closest Thing to Heaven	Released: September 20, 2009; Label: Warner Music; Format: CD	
Panatang Makabanda	Released: March 19, 2013; Label: Universal; Format: CD	
Sa Kabila ng Lahat	Released: September 15, 2017; Label: Star Music; Format: CD	

=== Extended plays (EP) ===
Title	Album details
Alab ng Puso	Released: 2001; Label: VIVA Records
You'll Be Safe Here	Released: 2005; Label: VIVA Records; Format: CD
Bagong Liwanag	Released: 2007; Label: VIVA Records; Format: CD

=== Live album ===
2002 — Live and Acoustic

=== Remix album ===
1998 — Remixed

=== Compilation albums ===
- 2001 — Rivermaya Greatest Hits
- 2005 — You'll Be Safe Here (Asian Edition)
- 2006 — Rivermaya: Greatest Hits 2006
- 2007 — The Best of Rivermaya (Malaysia Release)
- 2008 — Silver Series
- 2010 — 18 Greatest Hits

== Singles ==
List of singles as lead artist, showing year released, selected chart positions, and associated albums
Title	Year	Peak chart positions		Album
Title	Year	PHL	TPS	Album
"Ulan" / "Awit ng Kabataan"	1995	–	–	RiverMaya
"214"	1995	–	–	RiverMaya
"Bring Me Down"	1995	–	–	RiverMaya
"Kisapmata"	1995	–	–	Trip
"Himala"	1996	–	–	Trip
"Panahon Na Naman"	1996	–	–	Trip
"Hinahanap-Hanap Kita"	1997	–	–	Atomic Bomb
"Elesi"	1997	–	–	Atomic Bomb
"Kung Ayaw Mo, Huwag Mo"	1998	–	–	Atomic Bomb
"214" (Tripnotic '98 Mix)	1998	–	–	Remixed
"Kisapmata" (Mayhem '98 Mix)	1998	–	–	Remixed
"Nerbyoso"	1999	–	–	It's Not Easy Being Green
"Shattered Like"	1999	–	–	It's Not Easy Being Green
"Rodeo"	1999	–	–	It's Not Easy Being Green
"Faithless"	2000	–	–	Free
"Ambulansya"	2000	–	–	Free
"Alab ng Puso"	2001	–	–	Alab ng Puso
"Umaaraw, Umuulan"	2001	–	–	Tuloy ang Ligaya
"'Wag Na Init Ulo Baby"	2001	–	–	Tuloy ang Ligaya
"A Love to Share"	2003	–	–	Between the Stars and Waves
"Balisong"	2003	–	–	Between the Stars and Waves
"Ka Greenwich Ka"	2004	–	–	Non-album single
"Liwanag sa Dilim (Kaya Mo 'To)"	2004	–	–	You'll Be Safe Here
"You'll Be Safe Here"	2005	16	6	You'll Be Safe Here
"Sunday Driving"	2005	–	–	Between the Stars and Waves
"Makaaasa Ka"	2005	–	–	Non-album single
"241 (My Favorite Song)"	2006	–	–	Between the Stars and Waves
"Posible"	2006	–	–	Rivermaya: Greatest Hits 2006
"Isang Bandila"	2006	–	–	Isang Ugat, Isang Dugo
"Golden Boy"	2006	–	–	Isang Ugat, Isang Dugo
"Inosente Lang ang Nagtataka"	2007	–	–	Isang Ugat, Isang Dugo
"Sayang"	2007	–	–	Bagong Liwanag
"Sugal ng Kapalaran"	2008	–	–	Buhay
"Maskara"	2008	–	–	Buhay
"Sleep"	2008	–	–	Buhay
"Ligawan Stage (Nerbyoso Part 2)"	2008	–	–	Buhay
"Dangal"	2009	–	–	Closest Thing to Heaven
"Ambotsa"	2010	–	–	Closest Thing to Heaven
"Lipad"	2010	–	–	Non-album single
"Reminis"	2011	–	–	Closest Thing to Heaven
"Nowhere to Run"	2011	–	–	Non-album single
"Pilipinas, Kailan Ka Magigising?"	2013	–	–	Panatang Makabanda
"Nasa Sa'yo" (featuring Gloc-9)	2013	–	–	Panatang Makabanda
"Malayang Magmahal"	2013	–	–	Panatang Makabanda
"Tayo Lang Dalawa"	2013	–	–	Panatang Makabanda
"Tayo"	2013	–	–	Panatang Makabanda
"Manila"	2017	–	–	Sa Kabila ng Lahat
"8 to 5"	2017	–	–	Sa Kabila ng Lahat
"Casino"	2022	–	–	Non-album single

=== Collaborations ===
1896 Ang Pagsilang (1996)

- "Panahon na Naman"

Gimmicknation (2002)

- "Alab ng Puso"

Pulp Freakshow: The Album (2002)

- "Basketbol"

Electrico - Hip City (2006)

- "All Around the World"
