= Live and Acoustic (Rivermaya album) =

Live album by Rivermaya
- Released: January 28, 2003
- Recorded: Music Museum
- Genre: Alternative rock/Pop
- Length: 1:08:16
- Label: Viva Records
- Producer: Lizza G. Nakpil

Rivermaya chronology
Tuloy ang Ligaya (2001)	Live and Acoustic (2003)	Between the Stars and Waves (2003)

Live and Acoustic is a live album and the ninth overall album of the Filipino rock band, Rivermaya featuring Slapshock. This is a 2-disc album and has 22 tracks (13 audio tracks from Disc 1 and 9 music videos from Disc 2). The album has been released under Viva Records on January 28, 2003. This is the band's first live album filmed and recorded on May 18, 2002 from the "Double Trouble: Akoustik Rampage" concert at the Music Museum, Greenhills, San Juan. The bonus track "Basketbol" was performed at the Fort on December 8, 2001 to celebrate the 2nd Anniversary at Pulp Magazine also dubbed as "The Freakshow". The song was also included at the live album "Pulp: The Freakshow Album", released on 2002.

== Track listing ==
All tracks' words and music by Rico Blanco, except where noted.

No.	Title	Writer(s)	Note(s)	Length
1.	"Umaaraw, Umuulan"			6:09
2.	"Imposible"	Rico Blanco / Rivermaya	Features excerpt from "Jóga", Words & Music: Björk, Sjón	6:57
3.	"Alab Ng Puso"		Intro features excerpt from "Just Like Heaven", Words & Music: Smith, Gallup, Tolhurst, Williams; Outro features excerpt from "We Are The Champions", Words & Music: Freddie Mercury	5:22
4.	"Faithless"			5:17
5.	"Slap Vs. Freak*"		performed by: Slapshock	4:00
6.	"Agent Orange*"		performed by: Slapshock	4:32
7.	"Madapaka*"		performed by: Slapshock	3:31
8.	"Evil Clown (Slapshock Cover)"			6:42
9.	"Shiver"	G. Berryman, J.Buckland		5:31
10.	"'Wag Na Init Ulo Baby"			4:26

Bonus Tracks
No.	Title	Writer(s)	{{{extra_column}}}	Length
11.	"Basketbol"		Live at PULP Summer Slam, The Fort, December 8, 2001	5:31
12.	"Perslab"	Ramon Torralba & Dennis Garcia		3:44
13.	"Alab Ng Puso (Studio Version)"			6:34

DISC 2: (Video CD)
No.	Title	Length
1.	"Umaaraw, Umuulan"
2.	"Imposible"
3.	"Alab Ng Puso"
4.	"Faithless"
5.	"Evil Clown"
6.	"Shiver"
7.	"'Wag Na Init Ulo Baby"
8.	"Umaaraw, Umuulan (Concept Video) Bonus Track"
9.	"'Wag Na Init Ulo Baby (Concept Video) Bonus Track"

== Personnel ==
- Rico Blanco (lead vocals & keyboards)
- Mark Escueta (drums, percussion & vocals)
- Mike Elgar (guitar & vocals)
- Japs Sergio (bass guitar)
- Kakoy Legaspi (guitar)

== Production ==
- Executive producers: Vic del Rosario, Jr. and Vincent G. del Rosario
- Produced by Rico Blanco
- A&R: Rommel Sanchez
- Photography: Patrick Dy, Miggy Matute, and Ross Capili
- Art direction: Mark Escueta
- Album cover design and layout: Mark Escueta
