= Mike Elgar =

Filipino musician

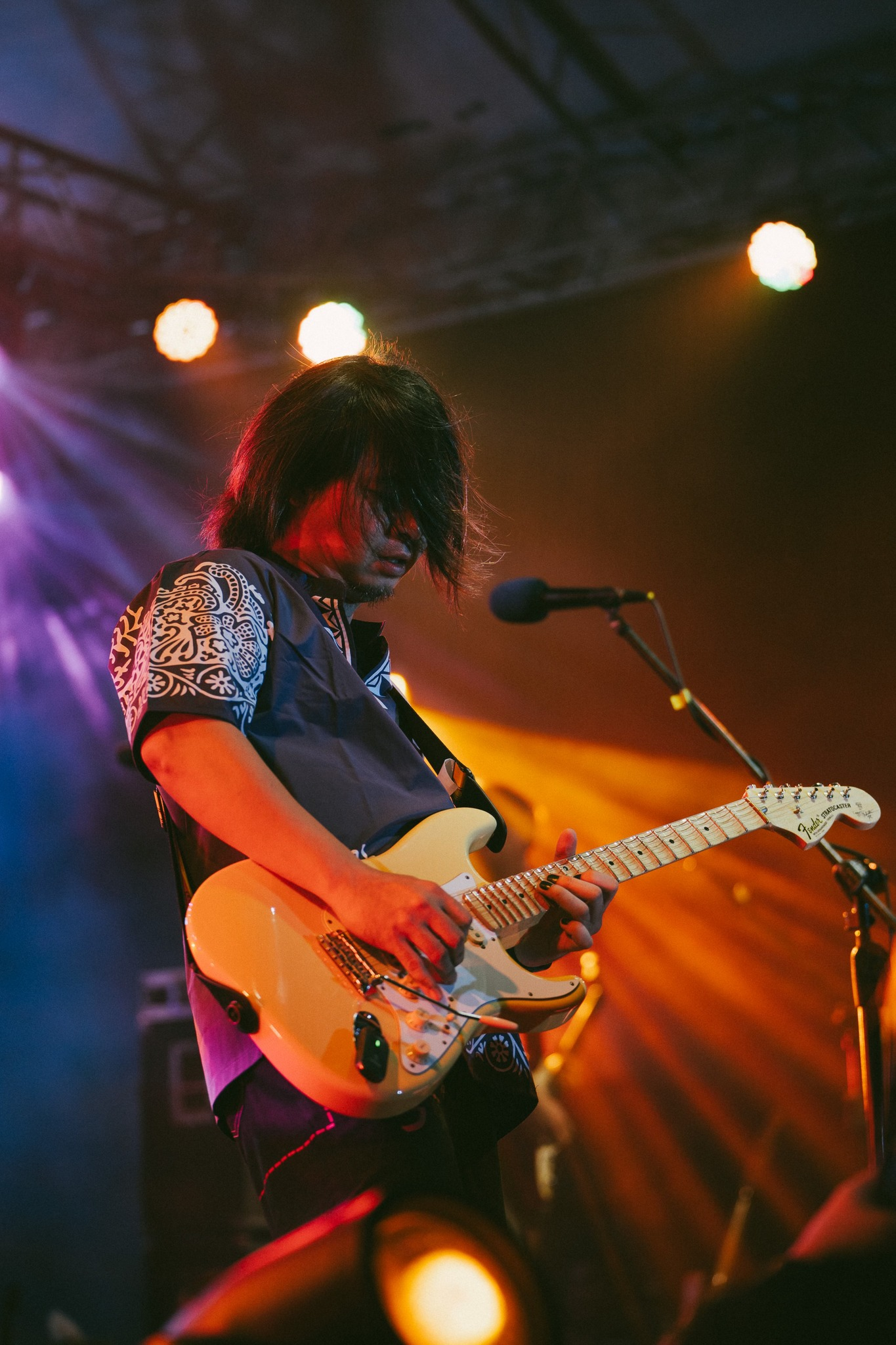
- Elgar in 2024

Background information
- Also known as: Greenman Six
- Born: Michael Maximino C. Elgar; May 8, 1976 (age 50); Manila, Philippines
- Genres: Rock, pop rock, alternative rock, Pinoy rock
- Occupations: Singer, Songwriter, Musician, Guitarist
- Instruments: Vocals, guitar, bass, drums, keyboards
- Years active: 1999–present
- Labels: Viva Records, Universal Records, Star Music

Michael Maximino C. Elgar, more commonly known as Mike Elgar, (born May 8, 1976) is a Filipino musician. He is popularly known as a guitarist and one of the lead vocalists for the band Rivermaya though he has been on hiatus from the band since 2023. He has been the band's longest serving guitarist ever since he joined in May 2001, and the second overall longest serving member next to Mark Escueta. As of 2024, he is currently performing under the moniker Greenman Six, his side solo project along with session musicians, which later became a full-fledged band.

== Music career ==
At the age of 10, he learned to play guitar. When he was 13 years old, he had already formed a band and played his first gig and in 1992 (15 years old), he was already a national guitar champion.

In 1999, he signed as a recording artist in the Jett Pangan Group and produced an Extended Play and an album before it was dissolved in 2001.

In 2000, he formed the band 7 Foot Junior as its frontman and guitarist.

He was later recruited by Rivermaya in May 2001 with Japs Sergio (from Daydream Cycle) and Kakoy Legaspi (from Mr. Crayon) after the departure of the original bassist Nathan Azarcon and session/touring guitarist J-John Valencia (who left by the summer of 2001).

He has since played with the band as the lead guitarist and eventually became one of the lead vocalists. Additionally, he contributes to the band as a songwriter.

On May 29, 2024, Elgar released a music video for the song "We Are Not Heroes" under a new moniker Greenman Six on his official Facebook account and newly formed YouTube channel. This marks Elgar's first publicly known musical venture since the reunion of Rivermaya's "classic lineup". There has been no official announcement from Elgar nor the band whether he left Rivermaya as of the song's release. Following this, Elgar also released music videos for "Hangin" on July 5, 2024, and "Andito Lang Ako" on August 11, 2024, on his new YouTube channel.

== Personal life ==
Elgar is a communications graduate of the Ateneo de Manila University. Elgar previously worked as a writer for ASAP, a Philippine television musical variety show produced by ABS-CBN.

== Discography ==
Rivermaya

- Tuloy ang Ligaya (2001)
- Between the Stars and Waves (2003)
- You'll Be Safe Here (EP) (2005)
- Isang Ugat, Isang Dugo (2006)
- Bagong Liwanag (EP) (2007)
- Buhay (2008)
- Closest Thing to Heaven (2009)
- Panatang Makabanda (2013)
- Sa Kabila ng Lahat (2017)
