= You'll Be Safe Here (Rico Blanco song) =

2023 song by Rico Blanco

Single by Rico Blanco
- Language: English
- Released: October 13, 2023
- Studio: Tracks Studios
- Genre: Alternative rock; OPM
- Length: 5:04
- Label: UMG Philippines
- Songwriter: Rico Blanco
- Producer: Rico Blanco

Rico Blanco singles chronology
"Palibot libot" (2022)	"You'll Be Safe Here" (2023)	"Sayong sayo (Papel, Gunting, Bato)" (2023)

"You'll Be Safe Here" is a song by Filipino singer-songwriter Rico Blanco. It was released as a digital re-recorded single on October 13, 2023. It was written and produced by Rico Blanco. The song was originally released as an extended play of the same name from his former band, Rivermaya in 2005. The song is an alternative rock track that sincerest a declaration of devotion to a lover, promising to protect and be with them, especially during the most difficult of times.

== Background and release ==
The EP of the same name, You'll Be Safe Here, was originally released by Rico Blanco's former band, Rivermaya in 2005, was pulled out of streaming platforms after the re-recorded version was released in 2023.

== Composition ==
"You'll Be Safe Here" is five minutes and four seconds long, composed in the key of B with a time signature of 4/4, and has a tempo of 75 beats per minute.

== Music video ==
Directed by M.G Bayani, he pays a subtle homage to the original music video, with similar elements to the visualizer. The video features Rico Blanco wearing a furry jacket, a reference to the original music video. The dark forest-fallen leaves motif also resembles the Rivermaya video, where the band performs in a dark forest. The sun shines in the visualizer, lighting up the castle-like setting, while the original music video illuminates the forest in sunshine during the last chorus.

In December 2023, the music video of "You'll Be Safe Here" was included in the Billboard Philippines' list of The Top 10 Music Videos Of 2023.

== Commercial performance ==
In 2024, the song debuted at number eighty-one on the Billboard Philippines Hot 100 on July 6, after the Philippines Songs were discontinued on July 1. On December 18, "You'll Be Safe Here" debuted at number six on Billboard Philippines' Top Philippine Songs, becoming Blanco's first entry. The song later topped at number sixteen on Billboard Philippines Hot 100 on the same week.

In March 2025, the song surpassed 80 million streams on Spotify.

== Charts ==
=== Weekly charts ===
Weekly chart performance for "You'll Be Safe Here"
Chart (2024)	Peak position
Philippines Hot 100 (Billboard Philippines)	16
Philippines (Top Philippine Songs)	6

=== Year-end charts ===
Year-end chart performance for "You'll Be Safe Here"
Chart (2024)	Position
Philippines (Philippines Hot 100)	66
