= Isang Ugat, Isang Dugo =

Studio album by Rivermaya
- Released: October 10, 2006
- Studio: The Birdhouse
- Genres: Alternative rock, pop rock, punk rock, hard rock
- Length: 53:01
- Label: Viva Records
- Producers: Vic del Rosario; Vincent del Rosario; Rico Blanco

Rivermaya chronology
Rivermaya: Greatest Hits 2006 (2006)	Isang Ugat, Isang Dugo (2006)	Bagong Liwanag (2007)

Singles from Isang Ugat, Isang Dugo
- 1. "Isang Bandila" Released: September 25, 2006; 2. "Inosente Lang Ang Nagtataka (Featuring Raimund Marasigan)" Released: February 7, 2007

Professional ratings
Review scores
Source	Rating
titikpilipino.com	4/5 stars

Isang Ugat, Isang Dugo (Filipino: "One Vein, One Blood") is the eighth studio album by Filipino rock band Rivermaya, released on October 10, 2006, through Viva Records. Except for original track "Isang Bandila (One Flag)", it is a covers album featuring songs by Filipino artists in the 1980s, including The Jerks, Joey Ayala, and Wuds.

Isang Ugat, Isang Dugo was the final album recorded featuring Rico Blanco as founding member and songwriter. "Isang Bandila" was used as the theme song for ABS-CBN's late-night news program Bandila from 2006 to 2018.

The album went platinum in March 2007.

== Track listing ==
No.	Title	Writer(s)	Originally by	Length
1.	"Isang Bandila (One Flag)"	Rico Blanco	Rivermaya	4:43
2.	"Golden Boy"	Jack Sicat	Ethnic Faces	3:54
3.	"Things Are Getting Complicated"	Binky Lampano	Dean's December	3:19
4.	"Tupperware Party"	Maly Andres	Violent Playground	3:08
5.	"Ilog (River)"	Joey Ayala	Joey Ayala	3:54
6.	"My Sanctuary"	Lenny Llapitan	Identity Crisis	5:46
7.	"Things Within"	Ronniel Francisco	Silos	4:03
8.	"Healing"	Lampano	Dean's December	4:10
9.	"Romantic Kill"	Chikoy Pura	The Jerks	2:30
10.	"Never the Bright Lights"	Andres	Violent Playground	4:24
11.	"Padayon (Continue)"	Ayala	Ayala	5:10
12.	"Inosente Lang Ang Nagtataka (Only the Innocent Wonders)"	Bobby Balingit	Wuds	4:01
13.	"Sumigaw, Umawit Ka (Shout, Sing)"	Llapitan	Identity Crisis	4:57

== Personnel ==
- Rico Blanco – lead vocals, keyboards, guitar, synths
- Mark Escueta – drums, percussion, backing vocals, trumpet
- Mike Elgar – guitar, backing vocals
- Japs Sergio – bass

Additional musicians:

- Kitchie Nadal – additional vocals on "Ilog"
- Raimund Marasigan – additional vocals on "Inosente Lang Ang Nagtataka"
- Junji Lerma – additional guitars on "Sumigaw, Umawit Ka"

== Album credits ==
- Executive Producers: Vic Del Rosario Jr. & Vincent Del Rosario
- Album Producer: Rico Blanco
- Supervising Producer: Marivic Benedicto
- Associate Producer: Mally Paraguya
- Coordinator: Raffy Lising
- Album Design and Layout: Paolo Lim
- Cover and Inside photos: Al Guerrero
