= You'll Be Safe Here =

EP by Rivermaya
- Released: January 28, 2005
- Recorded: 2005
- Studio: Tracks Studios; HIT Productions
- Genre: OPM
- Length: 21:16
- Label: Warner Music Philippines
- Producer: Rivermaya

Rivermaya chronology
Between the Stars and Waves (2003)	You'll Be Safe Here (2005)	Rivermaya: Greatest Hits 2006 (2006)

Singles from You'll Be Safe Here
- 1. "You'll Be Safe Here" Released: December 4, 2004; 2. "You'll Be Safe Here (International Release)" Released: April 15, 2005

You'll Be Safe Here is an EP by OPM rock band Rivermaya that features the eponymous song first used as the theme song of the 2004 ABS-CBN TV horror-drama series Spirits.

The CD of the EP includes two music videos for "You'll Be Safe Here", where the second video used an advanced technology that translates the song's lyrics into Filipino. The song was performed by the band at the 2006 MTV Asia Awards, where Rivermaya was the only Filipino band to perform. The song reached #1 on the Philippine music charts during its release. Two years after its release, it gained popularity in Asia and was thereafter slated for a European release.

The song "Liwanag Sa Dilim" was previously released as a single in July 2004 and added to the December 2004-released repackaged version of the band's 2003 album Between the Stars and Waves. It was also used as a jingle in a Pepsi advertisement, and later in an LBC Express advertisement that had the tagline "Basta Abot ng Araw, Abot ng LBC Remit Express".

The song "Imbecilesque" on the EP was previously recorded for the band's 2000 album Free.

In 2023, Rico Blanco released a re-recorded version of the song with an overhauled arrangement. All official versions of the original 2005 version has since been removed from streaming platforms.

== Other notable versions ==
- In 2018, Agsunta released a cover of the song as part of the official soundtrack of the iWant series Spirits: Reawaken.
- In 2022, Kean Cipriano, Janine Teñoso, and Adie all released their respective versions of the song as part of the official soundtrack of the film 366.
- In 2023, Moira Dela Torre released a cover of the song as part of the official soundtrack of the series Can’t Buy Me Love.

== Track listing ==
No.	Title	Writer(s)	Length
1.	"You'll Be Safe Here"	Rico Blanco	5:05
2.	"Liwanag Sa Dilim (Kaya mo 'to)"		3:41
3.	"You'll Be Safe Here (Acoustic version)"		4:53
4.	"Liwanag Sa Dilim (Kaya mo 'to) (Acoustic version)"		3:25
5.	"Imbecilesque"		4:12

== Personnel ==
- Rico Blanco – lead vocals, guitar, keyboard
- Mark Escueta – drums, percussion, vocals
- Mike Elgar – guitar, vocals
- Japs Sergio – bass guitar, backing vocals on track 4

Additional musicians:

- Mel Villana - strings arrangement
- Antonio Bautista, Eleazar Bautista, Proceso Yusi, Bernadette Cadorniga - violins (track 1 & 3)
- Leonardo Malazo, Regina Malazo, Maritess Ibero - cellos (track 1 & 3)
- Delfin Calderon - bass (track 1 & 3)

== Production ==
- Track 1 Recorded at: Tracks Studios, Mixed at Tracks Studios & HIT Productions by Angee Rozul & Rico Blanco
- Track 2 Recorded at: Tracks Studios, Mixed at HIT Productions by Rico Blanco
- Track 3 & 5 Recorded and Mixed at: Tracks Studios
- Track 4 Recorded & Mixed at: HIT Productions. Mastered By Angee Rozul at Tracks Studios
- Executive Producer: Revolver Music
- Producer: Rivermaya
- Design layout: Paolo Lim

== "Liwanag sa Dilim" in Leni Robredo's presidential campaign ==
On 8 February 2022, the remaining members of Rivermaya appeared at Leni Robredo's proclamation rally in Naga City, signaling the start of Robredo's 2022 campaign, and performed "Liwanag sa Dilim". The following day, Robredo's daughter Jillian uploaded an Instagram video post with the song on the background. Rivermaya's appearance at the rally would be the first of many appearances the band would make throughout the campaign, in which "Liwanag sa Dilim" virtually became the anthem for Robredo's supporters. On 17 April, Rivermaya created a new music video for the song, with Yeng Constantino on vocals and featuring volunteers and other celebrities involved in the Robredo campaign. On 26 April, another video with the song, featuring various celebrity musicians and singers led by singer Regine Velasquez, was released to further support the last days of the Robredo campaign.
