= Closest Thing to Heaven (album) =

Studio album by Rivermaya
- Released: 16 September 2009
- Recorded: 2009
- Studio: Tracks Studios
- Genre: Alternative rock, pop
- Length: 41:00
- Label: Warner Music Philippines
- Producer: Rivermaya

Rivermaya chronology
Buhay (2008)	Closest Thing to Heaven (2009)	Panatang Makabanda (2013)

Singles from Closest Thing to Heaven
- 1. "Dangal" Released: 10 September 2009; 2. "Here We Are Again" Released: 18 September 2009; 3. "Ambotsa" Released: 3 April 2010; 4. "Remenis" Released: 6 March 2011

Closest Thing to Heaven is the tenth studio album by the Filipino rock band Rivermaya. It contains ten tracks and was released under Warner Music Philippines in 2009. This is the final album with Jayson Fernandez and Japs Sergio, who left the band in 2011 and 2012, respectively. Rivermaya released three singles from the album: "Dangal", "Ambotsa", and "Remenis".

== Track listing ==
All tracks are written by Japs Sergio, except where noted

No.	Title	Writer(s)	Length
1.	"Mulat"		4:19
2.	"Ms. Estatic"		3:31
3.	"Ongano"		4:00
4.	"Remenis"	Mark Escueta	4:59
5.	"Locomoco"	Mike Elgar	3:40
6.	"Dangal"		3:28
7.	"Ambotsa"		3:55
8.	"Save Your Soul"	Mike Elgar	3:10
9.	"Here We Are Again"	Mike Elgar	5:29
10.	"The Sight of You"		3:27

== Personnel ==
- Jayson Fernandez – lead vocals, guitar
- Japs Sergio – bass, backing vocals, lead vocals (track 10)
- Mike Elgar – guitar, backing vocals, keyboards
- Mark Escueta – drums, percussion, backing vocals, guitar, trumpet

Additional musicians:

- Amanda Ling – keyboards (track 2)
- Aldwin Perez – violin (track 9)
- Akemi Elgar – "I Know Right" and "Daddy, That's Enough" (track 7)
- Jolina Magdangal and Al – additional clappers (track 1)

== Album credits ==
- Executive producer: – Jim Baluyut
- Associate producer – Neil Gregorio
- Studio coordinator – Liz Lorenzo
- All songs arranged by Rivermaya
- All songs recorded at Tracks Studios
- Engineered by Angee Rozul
- Assistant engineers – Monty Macalino, Liz Lorenzo, Rivermaya
- All songs mixed by Angee Rozul & Rivermaya
- Produced by Rivermaya & Angee Rozul
- Mastered by Angee Rozul
