= Panatang Makabanda =

Studio album by Rivermaya
- Released: March 19, 2013; January 15, 2015 (Repackaged Edition)
- Recorded: 2012–2013
- Studio: Tracks Studios; Sound Creative Studios; Birdhouse
- Genre: Pinoy rock, pop rock
- Label: Universal

Rivermaya chronology
| Closest Thing to Heaven (2009) | Panatang Makabanda (2013) | Sa Kabila ng Lahat (2017) |

Singles from Panatang Makabanda
- 1. "Pilipinas, Kailan Ka Magigising?" Released: March 16, 2013; 2. "Malayang Magmahal" Released: September 16, 2013; 3. "Tayo Lang Dalawa" Released: October 23, 2014; 4. "Nasa Sa'yo (Featuring Gloc 9)" Released: May 7, 2015; 5. "Tayo" Released: February 12, 2016

Panatang Makabanda (lit. 'Pledge of Allegiance') is the 11th studio album released by the Filipino rock band Rivermaya on March 19, 2013. It was their first album since 2009 and the first released without former members Jason Fernandez and Japs Sergio.

This is also the first album with drummer Ryan Peralta and the only album to feature vocalist/bassist Norby David prior to his departure in 2016.

== Track listing ==
| No. | Title | Writer(s) | Length |
|---|---|---|---|
| 1. | "Pilipinas, Kailan Ka Magigising?" | Words By Mark Escueta, Music By Rivermaya | 4:15 |
| 2. | "Malayang Magmahal" | Words By Mark Escueta, Music By Rivermaya | 4:43 |
| 3. | "Tayo Lang Dalawa" | Mike Elgar | 3:36 |
| 4. | "Magic Wand" | Mike Elgar | 3:55 |
| 5. | "Tayo" | Words By Mark Escueta, Music By Ryan Peralta | 5:21 |
| 6. | "Hey, Goodbye" | Mark Escueta | 3:01 |
| 7. | "Nasa Sa'yo (Featuring Gloc 9)" | Words By Mark Escueta, Rap By Gloc 9, Music By Rivermaya | 4:31 |
| 8. | "Can't Hide It Anymore" | Norby David | 4:29 |
| 9. | "Song About You" | Mike Elgar | 3:34 |
| 10. | "The Better One" | Ryan Peralta | 2:51 |
| 11. | "Perfect Crime" | Mike Elgar | 3:36 |
| 12. | "Paalam" | Mike Elgar | 3:47 |

Bonus DVD tracklist
| No. | Title | Length |
|---|---|---|
| 1. | "Lyric Videos" |
| 2. | "Outtakes & Live Performances" |
| 3. | "Music Video: Tayo Lang Dalawa; Malayang Magmahal; Pilipinas, Kailan Ka Magigising?" |

== Personnel ==
- Mark Escueta – lead vocals (tracks 2, 5, 6, 7), guitars, percussion, backing vocals
- Mike Elgar – lead vocals (track 3, 4, 9, 11, 12), guitars, backing vocals
- Norby David – lead vocals (tracks 1, 8, 10), bass, backing vocals
- Ryan Peralta – drums, percussion & keyboards

Additional musician:

- Gloc 9 – rap (track 7)

== Album credits ==
- Executive Producer: Kathleen Dy-Go
- Produced By: Rivermaya
- All Tracks mixed by Angee Rozul except Track 1 Mixed By Shinji Tanaka at Sound Creative Studios and Track 6 Mixed By Mark Escueta At The Birdhouse
- Mastered By Angee Rozul
- Album Concept And Layout By: Jay Saturnino Lumboy
- Photography By: Niko Villegas Of Edge Of Light Studios
- Additional Photos By: Jay Saturnino Lumboy
- Styling By: Angelo Ramirez De Cartagena
- Make Up: Amanda Padilla
