= Identity Crisis (band) =

Philippine new wave band

- Origin: Manila, Philippines
- Genres: New wave, post-punk
- Years active: 1986-1990, 2011
- Label: Dyna
- Past members: Lenny Llapitan; Resty Cornejo; Buddy Arceo; Arleigh "Bogs" Ambrosio (deceased); Marvin Mendiola; Carla Abaya

Identity Crisis was a Philippine new wave band. Known for its songs "Imagining Oktober" and "My Sanctuary", it was one of the bands that helped dominate the Philippine new wave scene, along with the Dawn.

== History ==
Identity Crisis was formed in 1986, consisting of Lenny Llapitan (keyboards), Resty (guitar), Buddy Boy (vocals), Bogs (bass), Marvin (drums) and Carla Abaya (vocals), also known as Cool Carla of the now-defunct radio station WXB 102. The band brought in elements of gothic rock, Middle Eastern, classical and jazz, backed with Abaya's gothic vocals, to make a distinct new wave sound. Following a pre-release single, "Whispering Castles," in late 1987, they released their debut album Tale Of Two, on April 4, 1988. Its singles "Imagining Oktober" and "My Sanctuary" received regular airplay. In 1990, the band recorded their last album Water Came Running, but broke up later the same year. By 1992, Abaya and Llapitan formed Mariya's Mistress, which lasted until 1997. In 2011, Identity Crisis reunited for a one-off concert, with bassist Tabs Tabuñar stepping in on behalf of Arleigh Ambrosio, who died earlier that year.

== Discography ==
=== Singles ===
- 1987 - Whispering Castles (Dyna Products, Inc.)
- 1989 - Will I Ever Know? (Dyna Products, Inc.)
- 1990 - To Live Another Day (Alpha Records Corportation)

=== Albums ===
- 1988 - Tale of Two (Dyna Products, Inc.)
- 1989 - Water Came Running (Dyna Products, Inc.)

== Other songs featured on compilations ==
- 1988 - Saviour (from Dyna's Christmas Album)
- 1989 - Where is My Eden? (from Karapatang Pantao)
- 1990 - To Live Another Day (from Pinagpalang Mundo)
