= It's Not Easy Being Green (album) =

Studio album by Rivermaya
- Released: January 14, 1999
- Studio: Pink Noise; Tracks Studios
- Genre: Alternative rock
- Length: 55:41
- Label: Musiko Records & BMG Records (Pilipinas) Inc.
- Producer: Rico Blanco

Rivermaya chronology
Atomic Bomb (1997)	It's Not Easy Being Green (1999)	Free (2000)

Singles from It's Not Easy Being Green
- 1. "Nerbyoso" Released: January 1999; 2. "Shattered Like" Released: 1999; 3. "Rodeo" Released: September 1999

It's Not Easy Being Green is the fourth studio album by Filipino rock band Rivermaya, released on January 14, 1999.

The album features the singles "Nerbyoso", "Rodeo", and "Shattered Like". It is the first album after Bamboo Mañalac's departure. This is also their first album with Rico Blanco as the lead vocalist. It is also the last album they recorded for BMG Records Pilipinas until in 2022 when they rejoined the label, now as Sony Music Philippines. The album hit gold barely a month after its release.

== Commercial performance ==
The album sold 40,000 units in the Philippines, reaching platinum certification status, though it is the band's lowest-selling album.

== Critical reception ==
Professional ratings
Review scores
Source	Rating
AllMusic	3/5 stars

David Gonzales of AllMusic reviewed the album and noticed some Britpop influences in "(A Little) Sorry (Should Make Everything Alright)" and "Shattered Like". He critiqued about Blanco's performance as vocalist on the album. He stated "...While Blanco is a fine singer, it's possible that the loss of the charismatic Bamboo has shaken the band's confidence."

== Track listing ==
All songs by Rico Blanco except where noted.

No.	Title	Writer(s)	Length
1.	"Grounded ang Girlfriend Ko"		2:32
2.	"Rodeo"		5:43
3.	"Shattered Like"		4:24
4.	"May Kasalanan"	N. Azarcon	3:30
5.	"Strontium 90"		1:10
6.	"(A Little) Sorry (Should Make Everything Alright)"		3:26
7.	"Bagong Taon"		7:10
8.	"It's Getting Late"		5:23
9.	"Nerbyoso"	M. Escueta /R. Blanco	3:46
10.	"Prodigal Dub 1 & 2"	N. Azarcon	5:01
11.	"Never Been Better"		4:14
12.	"She's So Uncool"	N. Azarcon	3:58
13.	"Homecoming"	N. Azarcon	5:31

== Personnel ==
- Rico Blanco – lead vocals, guitars, keyboards, synths
- Nathan Azarcon – bass guitar, vocals, lead vocals (tracks 4, 10, 12)
- Mark Escueta – drums & percussion, vocals

== Album credits ==
- Executive Producer for Rana Entertainment, Inc.: Chito Roño & Lizza G. Nakpil
- Executive Producers for BMG Records Pilipinas: Rudy Y. Tee
- A & R Direction: Vic Valenciano & Rommel Sanchez
- Album Photography: Eddie Boy Escudero & Eric Liongoren
- Digital Photography: Mark Escueta, Rico Blanco & Ryan Peralta
- Package Concept & Design: Mark Escueta & Rico Blanco
- Technical Assistant & Additional Layout: John Joel Lopez
- Recorded At: Pink Noise & TRACKS Studios
- Sound Engineer: Jun Reyes (Pink Noise) & Angee Rozul (TRACKS Studios)
- Album Mix: Angee Rozul & Rivermaya
- Horn Arrangements on "May Kasalanan" and "Bagong Taon": Mel Villena
- Horn Section: JD Villanueva (baritone sax & bass clarinet), Ernesto Abarillo & Glenn Joel Lucero (trumpets), Ronnie Marqueses (trombone) & Dix Lucero (clarinet & alto sax)

== Accolades ==
Year	Award giving body	Category	Nominated work	Result
1999	RX 93.1 Year-End Awards for OPM artists	Top 7 Ranking OPM Song Requests	"Shattered Like"	4th
1999	RX 93.1 Year-End Awards for OPM artists	Top 7 Ranking OPM Song Requests	"Rodeo"	6th
