= Free (Rivermaya album) =

Studio album by Rivermaya
- Released: August 30, 2000
- Genre: Alternative rock
- Length: 46:30
- Label: Self-released
- Producer: Rico Blanco

Rivermaya chronology
It's Not Easy Being Green (1999)	Free (2000)	Rivermaya Greatest Hits (2001)

Singles from Free
- 1. "Ambulansya" Released: 2000; 2. "Faithless" Released: 2000

Professional ratings
Review scores
Source	Rating
AllMusic	2.5/5 stars

Free is the fifth studio album from the Filipino rock band Rivermaya. It has 10 tracks and was released on August 30, 2000 by the band independently, literally given away for free which was a first for any Filipino artist previously signed to a major label. Free was named Album of the Year at the NU Rock Awards 2000. This was the last album to feature Nathan Azarcon who left the band in 2001; he eventually returned in 2016.

The song "Imbecillesque" was re-released on their 2005 EP, You'll Be Safe Here. The song "Straight No Chaser" was later covered by actor and reggae artist Boy2 Quizon. The song "Ambulansya" was prominently featured in the 2002 movie "Gamitan" (Viva Films).

On the back cover of the album, tracks #7 and #8 were typed incorrectly as in the order of the songs in the album.

== Track listing ==
All tracks are written by Rico Blanco, except where noted. All lead vocals by Rico Blanco, except where noted.

No.	Title	Writer(s)	Lead vocals	Length
1.	"Faithless"			4:19
2.	"Serious Offender"			4:17
3.	"Again"	Nathan Azarcon	Azarcon	3:17
4.	"Stranded"			3:56
5.	"Imbecillesque"			4:12
6.	"Ambulansya"			7:15
7.	"It's Strange But It's True"			4:24
8.	"Straight No Chaser"	Azarcon	Azarcon	3:10
9.	"Tulog"			3:47
10.	"Steady"			7:53
Total length:				46:30

== Personnel ==
Adapted from the liner notes.

Rivermaya

- Rico Blanco – guitars, vocals (all tracks except 3 and 8), keyboards, synthesizer
- Nathan Azarcon – bass, vocals (tracks 3 and 8)
- Mark Escueta – drums, percussion

Production

- Rico Blanco – producer, cover art
- Angee Rozul – engineer
