= Buhay (album) =

Studio album by Rivermaya
- Released: January 21, 2008
- Recorded: 2007
- Studios: The Birdhouse; El Garden & Japs Loft Studios
- Genre: Alternative rock/Pop
- Length: 66:32
- Label: Warner Music Philippines
- Producer: Rivermaya

Rivermaya chronology
Bagong Liwanag (2007)	Buhay (2008)	Closest Thing to Heaven (2009)

Singles from Buhay
- 1. "Sugal ng Kapalaran" Released: November 25, 2007; 2. "Maskara" Released: April 6, 2008; 3. "Sleep" Released: June 24, 2008; 4. "Ligawan Stage (Nerbyoso Part 2)" Released: December 17, 2008

Buhay (Filipino, "Life") is the ninth studio album of the Filipino rock band, Rivermaya. It contains 16 tracks and was released under Warner Music Philippines on January 21, 2008. This album is the first of Rivermaya without Rico Blanco as the band's vocalist. He is replaced by then 18-year-old Jayson Fernandez, who won the search for a new vocalist in a series of reality TV auditions. The band members took turns on vocals with the arrangement that whoever wrote the song, will be the one to sing it. The band has released four singles from this album, "Sugal ng Kapalaran", "Maskara", "Sleep" and "Ligawan Stage (Nerbyoso Part 2)".

== Track listing ==
No.	Title	Writer(s)	Length
1.	"Nice To"	Mark Escueta	4:11
2.	"All For You"	Japs Sergio	4:37
3.	"Ligawan Stage (Nerbyoso Part 2)"	Japs Sergio, Jayson Fernandez, Mark Escueta	3:44
4.	"I Want You"	Mike Elgar	4:00
5.	"Checkmate"	Japs Sergio	4:44
6.	"A.M"	Mike Elgar	3:02
7.	"Maskara"	Mark Escueta	3:49
8.	"Closer"	Mark Escueta	4:40
9.	"Sugal Ng Kapalaran"	Japs Sergio	4:24
10.	"Restless"	Mark Escueta	5:25
11.	"Piping Tom"	Japs Sergio	3:15
12.	"Pure"	Mike Elgar	3:54
13.	"Hindi Ako Susuko"	Mike Elgar	3:45
14.	"Alone"	Mike Elgar	6:20
15.	"Kemikal Reaction"	Japs Sergio	2:48
16.	"Sleep"	Mark Escueta	3:53

== Personnel ==
- Japs Sergio – lead vocals (tracks 2, 5, 9, 11, 15), bass, guitar (tracks 15, 16), backing vocals
- Jayson Fernandez – lead vocals (tracks 3, 4, 9, 13, 16), guitar, backing vocals
- Mike Elgar – lead vocals (tracks 6, 12, 14), guitar, keyboards, backing vocals
- Mark Escueta – lead vocals (tracks 1, 7, 8, 10), drums, percussion, trumpet, guitars, synths (tracks 8, 10), backing vocals

Additional musicians:

- Aia de Leon – additional vocals (track 3)
- Hans Dimayuga – backing vocals (track 12)
- Mike Vicente – Piano & Organ (track 12), Synth & Organ (Track 14)
- Jerome Velasco – lead guitar (track 9)

== Album credits ==
- Executive Producer: Jim Baluyut
- Associate Producers: Lizza Nakpil & Chito S. Roño
- Producer: Rivermaya
- Art Direction: Sarah Gaugler
- Sound Engineers: Mark Escueta, Japs Sergio, Mike Elgar and Jayson Fernandez
- Mastered by Angee Rozul at Tracks Studios
- All Songs arranged by Rivermaya
- All Tracks are recorded at the Birdhouse, El Garden & Japs Loft Studios; Mixed at the Birdhouse
