= Atomic Bomb (album) =

Studio album by Rivermaya
- Released: January 31, 1997
- Recorded: July–October 1996
- Studio: Digital FX International Inc.
- Genre: Acid jazz; Experimental rock; Alternative rock; Jazz rock; Pop rock
- Length: 1:07:18
- Label: Musiko Records & BMG Records (Pilipinas) Inc.
- Producer: Rico Blanco

Rivermaya chronology
Trip (1996)	Atomic Bomb (1997)	It's Not Easy Being Green (1999)

Singles from Atomic Bomb
- 1. "Hinahanap-Hanap Kita" Released: 1997; 2. "Elesi" Released: 1997; 3. "Kung Ayaw Mo, Huwag Mo" Released: August 1997; 4. "If" Released: 1998; 5. "Luha" Released: 1998

Professional ratings
Review scores
Source	Rating
Allmusic	4.5/5 stars

Atomic Bomb is the third studio album by Filipino rock band Rivermaya. It has 16 tracks and was released by BMG Records (Pilipinas) Inc. on 31 January 1997.

It was reported that the album had gone gold before it hit the stores on January 31. Basing on initial orders from Metro Manila record bars, BMG shipped out 25,000 cassettes. Major record bars in malls reported they were out of stock after a few days. In the Philippines, an album must sell 20,000 copies to be certified gold.

This is the last Rivermaya album with Bamboo Mañalac as lead singer.

== Track listing ==
All tracks by Rico Blanco, except where noted.

No.	Title	Writer(s)	Length
1.	"Mabuhay"		3:58
2.	"Elesi"		5:00
3.	"Inst. 1: Spike The Mayo"		2:20
4.	"Sunny Days"		4:49
5.	"Hangman (I Shot the Walrus)"	B. Mañalac/Rivermaya (part 1 and 3), Rico Blanco (part 2)	6:46
6.	"Saturday (Bakit Ako?)"	N. Azarcon/Rivermaya	2:22
7.	"Inst. 2: The Chase"		1:15
8.	"If"	N. Azarcon	5:28
9.	"Wild Angel Candy"		2:47
10.	"Hinahanap-Hanap Kita"		6:03
11.	"Luha"	N. Azarcon	4:04
12.	"Tea For Two"	N. Azarcon/Rivermaya	3:33
13.	"Ballroom Dancing"		4:01
14.	"Inst. 3: Ground Control To Major Tom"		0:56
15.	"Fever"	B. Mañalac/Rivermaya	5:14
16.	"Kung Ayaw Mo, Huwag Mo"		3:47
17.	"Destiny (CD Bonus Track)"		4:55

== Personnel ==
- Francisco "Bamboo" Mañalac – lead vocals, backing vocals (track 6)
- Rico Blanco – guitars, keyboards, backing vocals, lead vocals (tracks 5, 11, 12)
- Nathan Azarcon – bass guitar, lead vocals (track 6)
- Mark Escueta – drums & percussion, lead vocals (track 6)

== Album credits ==
- Producer: Rico Blanco
- Executive producer for Rana Entertainment, Inc.: Chito Roño & Lizza G. Nakpil
- Executive producers for BMG Records Pilipinas: Rudy Y. Tee
- A&R direction: Vic Valenciano
- Sound engineer: Slick
- Assistant sound engineers: Caryl Campos & Minnith Mota
- Album mix: Slick with Rivermaya
- Recorded at Digital FX International Inc.
- Additional string tracks recorded at Cinema Audio, Inc. Recording Studio
- Package design: Ariel Dalisay of Artworks Adv.
- Cover photography: courtesy of Philippine Daily Inquirer
- B&W inside photography: courtesy of Philippine Daily Inquirer
- Back cover and color photography: Eddie Boy Escudero
- Strings for "If" and "Luha" arranged by Mel Villena
- Strings for "If" and "Luha" performed by Sonata Strings led by Benjie Bautista

== Accolades ==
Year	Award giving body	Category	Nominated work	Result
1997	RX 93.1 Year-End Awards	Top 20 Requested OPM Songs	"Hinahanap Hanap Kita"	5th
1997	RX 93.1 Year-End Awards	Top 20 Requested OPM Songs	"Kung Ayaw Mo, Huwag Mo"	8th
1997	RX 93.1 Year-End Awards	Top 20 Requested OPM Songs	"Elesi"	9th
1997	RX 93.1 Year-End Awards	Top 20 Requested OPM Songs	"If"	20th
1998	RX 93.1 Year End Awards	Top 7 Ranking OPM Requests	"Ballroom Dancing"	6th
