= Trip (Rivermaya album) =

Studio album by Rivermaya
- Released: February 14, 1996
- Studio: Digital FX International Inc.
- Genre: OPM, Alternative Rock, Dream pop
- Label: Musiko Records; BMG Records (Pilipinas) Inc.
- Producer: Rico Blanco, Chito S. Roño & Lizza G. Nakpil

Rivermaya chronology
RiverMaya (1994)	Trip (1996)	Atomic Bomb (1997)

Professional ratings
Review scores
Source	Rating
Allmusic	review

Trip is the second studio album by Filipino rock band Rivermaya. It has 13 tracks and was released by BMG Records (Pilipinas) Inc. in 1996. It is the first album to introduce Rico Blanco as the band's full-time guitarist following the departure of Perf de Castro the previous year. Since the album release, the album went gold overnight and reached platinum status in six days and the carrier single "Kisapmata" became the most requested tune in Top Rating FM Stations. On June 30, 1996, the band launched their first Music Video for their next single "Himala" at the TV show ASAP.

The album saw the band's departure from its AOR-oriented sound in favor of more alternative rock direction that continued for subsequent albums.

== Track listing ==
All tracks written by Rico Blanco, except where noted.

No.	Title	Writer(s)	Length
1.	"The Princess of Disguise"		3:06
2.	"Hilo"		4:30
3.	"Monopoly"		4:44
4.	"Himala"		4:08
5.	"Flowers"		5:37
6.	"Sunog"	Rico Blanco; Nathan Azarcon	6:12
7.	"Is It Sunny Where You Are?"	Blanco; Azarcon	3:08
8.	"Kundiman"		5:27
9.	"Lost"		3:40
10.	"Kisapmata"		4:43
11.	"Nerd Kills Goliath"		0:41
12.	"Out Of Reach"		4:30
13.	"Panahon Na Naman (vocals Rico Blanco, original version)"		6:07
Total length:			56:33

== Trivia ==
- The album art was illustrated by well-known X-Men comic-book artist and Image Comics co-founder Whilce Portacio.
- The single "Panahon na Naman" were included in the compilation album "1896: Ang Pagsilang". The album commemorates the historical 1896 uprising of Filipinos against the Spanish colonizers.
- Former member Bamboo Mañalac stated the song "Flowers" is his favorite Rivermaya song.
- In 2000, Comedian Michael V covered the song Kisapmata in English Version "Twinkle of an Eye". The track was included in his album "MEB: Miyusik English Bersyon".
- In 2007, The song "Kisapmata" was covered by Yasmien Kurdi and was used as a carrier single for her 2nd album Love Is All I Need. The song was also covered by YouTube sensation Raphiel Shannon and release as a debut single. A few days after its online release, her song grabbed the No. 4 spot on Spotify’s Philippines Viral 50 chart last March 30, 2018.
- The song Himala was covered by Kitchie Nadal as a theme song for the 2008 ABS CBN TV drama series Humingi Ako Sa Langit starring Judy Ann Santos.

== Personnel ==
- Francisco "Bamboo" Mañalac – lead vocals, backing vocals (track 13)
- Rico Blanco – guitars, keyboards, backing vocals, lead vocals (tracks 9, 12, 13)
- Nathan Azarcon – bass, backing vocals, guitars (tracks 2, 4, 6, 7)
- Mark Escueta – drums & percussion, backing vocals

Additional musician

- Francisco Llorin – cello (track 13)

== Album credits ==
- Produced by: Rico Blanco
- Supervising Producers: Chito Roño & Lizza G. Nakpil
- Executive Producers: Rudy Y. Tee
- A & R: Vic Valenciano
- Sound Engineer: Slick
- Album Mix: Slick with Rico Blanco and Nathan Azarcon
- Package Art: Whilce Portacio
- Package Direction: Rico Blanco

== Accolades ==
Year	Award giving body	Category	Nominated work	Result
1996	RX 93.1 Year-End Awards	Top 20 Requested OPM Songs	"Himala"	1st
1996	RX 93.1 Year-End Awards	Top 20 Requested OPM Songs	"Kisapmata"	3rd
1996	RX 93.1 Year-End Awards	Top 20 Requested OPM Songs	"Panahon na Naman"	13th
1996	RX 93.1 Year-End Awards	Top 20 Requested Songs	"Himala"	8th
1996	RX 93.1 Year-End Awards	Top 20 Requested Songs'	"Kisapmata"	10th
1997	RX 93.1 Year-End Awards	Top 20 Requested OPM Songs	"Kundiman"	13th
