= Japs Sergio =

Filipino musician

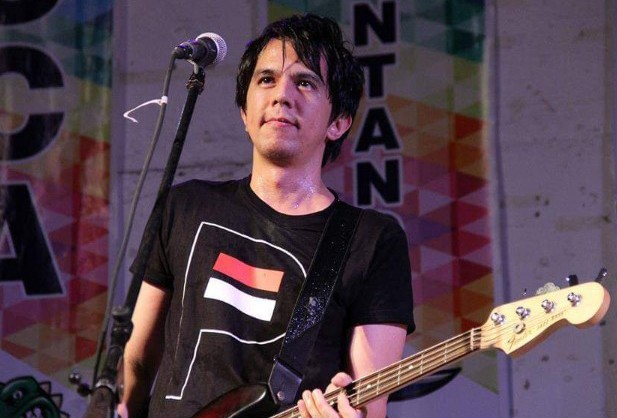
- Sergio as a touring musician for Rivermaya in 2016

Background information
- Also known as: Japsuki
- Born: John Paul Ricafranca Sergio; August 20, 1979 (age 46); Parañaque, Philippines
- Genres: Rock; pop rock; alternative rock
- Occupations: Musician, Record producer
- Instruments: Guitar; vocals; bass; drums; synthesizer
- Years active: 2001–present

John Paul "Japs" Ricafranca Sergio (born August 20, 1979) is a Filipino musician and record producer. He is a former bassist, vocalist, guitarist of the Filipino band Rivermaya and the current guitarist/vocalist/frontman for the band Peso Movement.

== Career ==
Sergio joined the band in April 2001 as a session member when he took over the role of Nathan Azarcon, who left the band in February 2001. When Kakoy Legaspi and Mike Elgar joined in May 2001, Sergio was officially absorbed and the band began recording for "Tuloy ang Ligaya". Their first performance under their new lineup was at NU Pocket Concerts in Alabang Town Center on June 2, 2001. Known to many as Japs, Japsuki, and JP, he is actually initially a drummer. Furthermore, he is also one of the founders of the band Daydream Cycle and is the guitarist and co-songwriter of the said band.

He went on hiatus some time in 2011 in Rivermaya as he was focusing with Daydream Cycle. On December 19, 2011, Sergio released his project solo album titled Monologue Whispers under the mononym Japsuki. In November 2012, Sergio posted on his official Facebook page that he is no longer with Rivermaya. Currently, he is the frontman of the band Peso Movement along Francis Reyes, Macky Macaventa and Kurt Floreska. Sergio labels the group's genre as "dirty rock". On 2013, the band released their first song "Aling Pag-ibig Pa" as a part of the compilation album Rock Supremo, a 150th birth anniversary that aims to honor the life and legacy of Andres Bonifacio. In 2014, the band released their debut album "The Gentle Sound of Chaos" with its carrier single "Bawal Simangot". The album was well received by critics. In 2015, the band released their 2nd single "Dadami Pera".

In 2015, he released his 2nd album "Pinoy Pop" under the mononym Japsuki, with the carrier single "Hirap Bago Sarap".

In 2016, Sergio temporarily returned to Rivermaya taking over Norby David after he left the band the same year. He toured on some live shows until original bassist Nathan Azarcon permanently filled in the position.

He co-produced two tracks on Rivermaya's 13th studio album Sa Kabila ng Lahat, which was released on September 15, 2017. On the same year, he released his third solo album "Stereo Mood Swings".

== Personal life ==
His older brother Andrew Ryan Steve "Dok" Sergio (born February 27, 1976) is the bassist of his other band, Daydream Cycle and the Ely Buendia-led Pupil.

Sergio attended Manresa School in BF Homes Parañaque from preparatory school until high school. Sergio graduated from De La Salle University–College of Saint Benilde in 2000 with a degree in AB Human Resources Management.

== Discography ==
=== With Rivermaya ===
- Tuloy ang Ligaya (2001)
- Between the Stars and Waves (2003)
- You'll Be Safe Here (EP) (2005)
- Isang Ugat, Isang Dugo (2006)
- Bagong Liwanag (EP) (2007)
- Buhay (2008)
- Closest Thing to Heaven (2009)
- Sa Kabila ng Lahat (2017) — as Producer

=== With Daydream Cycle ===
- Daydream Cycle (2001)
- You're Still Young At Heart (2003)
- Underwater Kite (2005)

=== With Peso Movement ===
- The Gentle Sound of Chaos (2014)

=== As Japsuki ===
- Monologue Whispers (2011)
- Pinoy Pop (2015)
- Stereo Mood Swings (2017)
- Steady Lang (2025)
