= Between the Stars and Waves =

Album by Rivermaya

Studio album by Rivermaya
- Released: October 10, 2003; December 2004 (Special Edition Release)
- Recorded: 2003
- Studio: Birdhouse (Escueta Residence/Studio Espesyal)
- Genre: Pinoy rock, alternative rock, pop rock
- Length: 57:16
- Label: Viva Records
- Producer: Rivermaya

Rivermaya chronology
Live and Acoustic (2002)	Between the Stars and Waves (2003)	You'll Be Safe Here EP (2005)

Repackaged Edition

Singles from Between the Stars and Waves
- 1. "A Love To Share" Released: October 7, 2003; 2. "Balisong" Released: April 28, 2004; 3. "Liwanag Sa Dilim" Released: July 1, 2004; 4. "Sunday Driving" Released: September 19, 2005; 5. "241 (My Favorite Song)" Released: May 12, 2006

Professional ratings
Review scores
Source	Rating
titikpilipino.com	4/5 stars

Between the Stars and Waves is the 7th studio album of the Filipino rock band Rivermaya. It has been released on 2003 under Viva Records. It has 15 tracks. A Special Edition of the album were released in December 2004 including bonus tracks "Liwanag sa Dilim" and the acoustic version of the song.

It is also the last album they recorded with Kakoy Legaspi who left a year later after the album was released.

== Track listing ==
All songs composed by Rico Blanco except where noted.

No.	Title	Writer(s)	Length
1.	"Sunday Driving"	Music By Japs Sergio / Rico Blanco	4:12
2.	"A Love to Share"		3:15
3.	"241 (My Favorite Song)"		4:35
4.	"One Good Afternoon"	Japs Sergio	3:48
5.	"Balisong"	Kakoy Legaspi / Rico Blanco	3:40
6.	"Take My Cue"	Mike Elgar	3:39
7.	"Table for Two"	Japs Sergio	3:17
8.	"Atat"	Elgar / Rico Blanco	3:50
9.	"She"	Elgar	3:39
10.	"Noontime Show"	Japs Sergio	2:31
11.	"I Can't Let Go"	Elgar	4:40
12.	"Pinaiyak Mo Naman Ako"	Elgar	3:44
13.	"Squeezy"	Elgar	5:03
14.	"Home"	Elgar	4:30
15.	"A Love to Share (Acoustic)"		2:53

Liwanag Sa Dilim (Between The Stars And Waves Special Edition) (2004)
No.	Title	Length
16.	"Liwanag sa Dilim"	3:38
17.	"Liwanag Sa Dilim (Acoustic Version)"	3:53

== Personnel ==
- Rico Blanco – lead vocals, guitar, keyboards, synths
- Mark Escueta – drums, percussion, trumpet, backing vocals
- Mike Elgar – guitar, backing vocals, lead vocals (track 9, 12, 13)
- Japs Sergio – bass, lead vocals (track 7), backing vocals on Liwanag Sa Dilim (Acoustic Version)
- Kakoy Legaspi – guitar

Additional musicians:

- Kathy Meneses of Daydream Cycle – additional vocals (track 4)
- Jerome Nunez of Mannos – violin (track 9)

== Album credits ==
- Executive Producers: Vic del Rosario Jr. & Vincent del Rosario
- Associate Producer: Joey E. Singian
- A & R: Romel Sanchez
- Art Direction, Photography and Original Artwork Commissioned for the Album: Kawayan de Guia
- Graphic Design and Lay-out: Maria Regina Tuazon
- Additional Lay-out: Restyabellatica
- Producer: Rivermaya
- Sound Engineer: Mark Escueta
- Assistant Sound Engineer: Rico Blanco, Mike Elgar, Japs Sergio, Kakoy Legaspi
- Track 4 features an excerpt from "Panic" by the Smiths. Words and Music by Marr & Morrissey.
- All songs arranged by Rivermaya.
- All songs recorded and mixed at the Birdhouse (Escueta Residence/Studio Espesyal)
- Additional recordings at Hit Productions Inc.
- Mastered by Angee Rozul and Rivermaya at Tracks Studios.
- Liwanag Sa Dilim: recorded at Tracks Records by Angee Rozul and at HIT Productions by Rico Blanco. Acoustic Version was recorded by Rico Blanco at HIT Productions
- Executive Producer (Liwanag Sa Dilim): Lizza Nakpil/Rivermaya/Pepsi-Cola Product Philippines, Inc.
- Associate Producer (Liwanag Sa Dilim): Mony Romano
- Original Cover Artwork (Liwanag Sa Dilim): Wakasan oil on canvas by Rico Blanco
- Graphic Design And Lay-out (Liwanag Sa Dilim): Fudge Magazine, Sesame Seed Creatives Inc.

== Songs ==
=== Balisong ===
Written by Rico Blanco and Kakoy Legaspi, the song was re-released when Rivermaya came out with their International EP You'll Be Safe Here.

Two music videos have been made for "Balisong". The first came out in 2004. It begins with a piano intro by vocalist Rico Blanco, then the band starts to play the song inside a room that is lit by sunlight. As the song progresses, pictures and letters are shown all over the room, revealing the "past relationship" that the song is portraying was being reminisced.

The second video came out on February 13, 2007, directed by Rizal Mantovani. when Rivermaya had just released their international debut "You'll Be Safe Here". The video was set in a carnival where Rivermaya is one of the acts. This video also shows Rico Blanco playing the piano, but to a lesser extent. As the video plays, Rico Blanco is attracted to a certain woman (Mariana Renata), dressed in a red gown. He then comes up to the woman and sings to her the chorus of the song. The song ends when all the carnival acts leave and the band is left alone. This video was renamed "Bali Song," possibly to differentiate it from the first video.

"Balisong" is one of very few OPM songs which have two different videos made for them. Other songs performed by OPM bands which have two music videos are "You'll Be Safe Here" also by Rivermaya, "Narda" and "Ambisyoso" by Kamikazee, "Stars" by Callalily, "Yugto" by Rico Blanco, and "With A Smile" by Eraserheads.

In Philippine culture, balisong is a knife with a retractable blade. Strangely, the song does not reference the knife or even mentioned in the song lyrics. This song served as the official theme song of the 2017 movie 100 Tula Para Kay Stella, which stars Bela Padilla and JC Santos. Aside from the said movie in connection to the song, Balisong, the song is also used in CreamSilk's Modern Filipinas Transformed campaign with the appearances of Nadine Lustre, Yassi Pressman, Julie Anne San Jose, Coleen Garcia, Rachelle Ann Go, Heart Evangelista, Pia Wurtzbach, Lea Salonga, Anne Curtis & Sam Pinto in coincidence with the celebration of International Women's Day which is celebrated annually by all women worldwide.

== Accolades ==
Year	Award giving body	Category	Nominated work	Result
2005	Nu 107.5 2004 Year End Countdown	Top 20 OPM Songs on the 2004 NU107 Countdown	"Balisong"	10th
2005	Nu 107.5 2004 Year End Countdown	Top 20 OPM Songs on the 2004 NU107 Countdown	"Liwanag Sa Dilim"	14th
2005	Nu 107.5 2004 Year End Countdown	Top 107 Songs for 2004 (ranked from #107 to #1)	"Balisong"	15th
2005	Nu 107.5 2004 Year End Countdown	Top 107 Songs for 2004 (ranked from #107 to #1)	"Liwanag Sa Dilim"	22nd
