= Sa Kabila ng Lahat (Rivermaya album) =

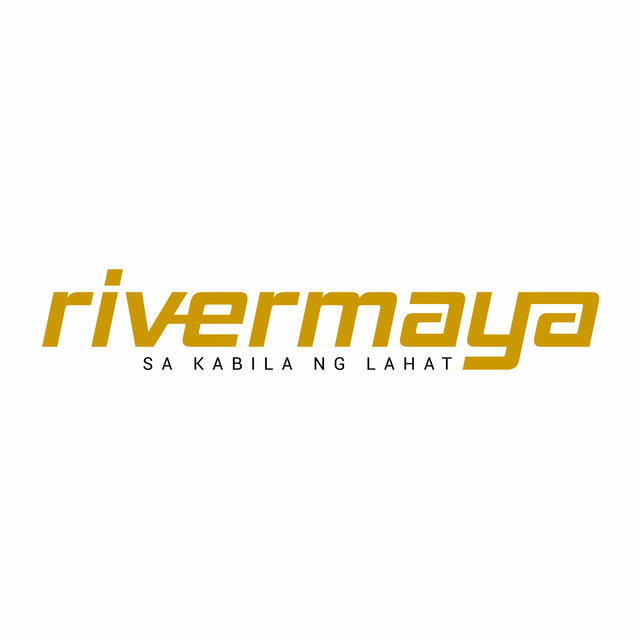

Studio album by Rivermaya
- Released: September 15, 2017
- Recorded: 2016–2017
- Studio: Tower Of Doom
- Genre: Pinoy rock, OPM
- Label: Star Music
- Producer: Rivermaya

Rivermaya studio album chronology
Panatang Makabanda (2013)	Sa Kabila ng Lahat (2017)

Singles from Sa Kabila ng Lahat
- 1. "Manila" Released: June 14, 2017; 2. "8 to 5" Released: September 7, 2017; 3. "#SBN" Released: September 28, 2018

Sa Kabila ng Lahat (transl. Despite Everything) is the twelfth studio album by Filipino rock band Rivermaya. The album was released on September 15, 2017, nationwide and digital format through Star Music. This is the first album to feature bassist Nathan Azarcon after his departure in 2001 and the last album to feature drummer Ryan Peralta who left the band a year later.

== Overview ==
In mid-2016, the band began recording for their upcoming 13th studio at Tower of Doom Studios in Diliman, Quezon City with former member Japs Sergio co-producing the album. On May 22, 2017, the band signed with ABS-CBN-owned record label Star Music and later announced that it will release its 13th studio album. Angelo Rozul serves as the album's sound engineer. The first single, "Manila" was released on June 14, 2017. On September 7, 2017, the band released a lyric video of their second single entitled "8 to 5". They also announced that the album will be released on September 15 on all digital platforms nationwide and an album tour was also announced.

== Track listing ==
All tracks are written by Rivermaya except Track 5 co-written by Jay-O Orduña.

No.	Title	Length
1.	"Manila"	3:32
2.	"One Step"	3:30
3.	"8 to 5"	5:04
4.	"Sabay Tayo"	4:06
5.	"Mula Ngayon"	5:21
6.	"#SBN" (Sobrang Bagay Natin)	5:26
7.	"Sana Ikaw"	3:24
8.	"Irena"	3:40
Total length:		33:53

== Personnel ==
Rivermaya

- Mark Escueta – lead vocals (tracks 4, 5, 6), backing vocals, guitars, percussion
- Mike Elgar – lead vocals (tracks 3, 7), backing vocals, guitars
- Nathan Azarcon – lead vocals (tracks 1, 2, 5, 8), backing vocals, bass
- Ryan Peralta – drums, percussion, keyboards

Additional musicians:

- Deejay Rodriguez – additional percussion (track 2)
- Anna San Juan, Symoun Durias, Miki Boado – additional backing vocals (track 2)
- Raymund Fabul, Jerry Benig, Buboy Aratea, Kaka Castillo, Anna San Juan, Symoun Durias, Kyle Clayton – additional backing vocals (track 3)

== Album credits ==
- Executive Producers: Malou N. Santos, Roxy Liquigan, Rivermaya
- Co-Produced by: Kyle Clayton And Eric Perlas
- Audio Content Head: Jonathan Manalo
- Promo Supervisor: Jayson Sarmientoo
- Promo Specialist: Jholina Luspo
- Promo Associate: London Angeles
- Promo Coordinators: Mela Ballano & Ron Care
- Star Songs Inc, And Media Head: Marivic Benedicto
- Music Publishing Officer: Abbey Alledo
- Music Publishing Specialist: Luisa Ponceca
- New Media Technical Assistant: Eaizen Almazan
- Music Servicing Officer: Abbey Aledo
- Sales And Distribution: Milette Quizon
- Photography By: Dianna Capco
- Additional Photography By: Raymund Fabul
- Album Inlay By: Margaux Paras, Andrew Castillo
- Creative Head: Andrew Castillo
- Track 1 & 8 Co-Produced By: Japs Sergio
- Recorded At Tower At Doom
- Engineered, Mixed, And Mastering By: Kyle Clayton & Eric Perlas
