= Bagong Liwanag =

EP by Rivermaya
- Released: August 15, 2007
- Recorded: May–July 2007
- Genres: Rock, OPM
- Label: Warner Music Philippines
- Producer: Rivermaya

Rivermaya chronology
Isang Ugat, Isang Dugo (2006)	'''Bagong Liwanag''' (2007)	Buhay (2008)

Singles from Bagong Liwanag
- 1. "Sayang" Released: June 22, 2007; 2. "Sumigaw" Released: September 3, 2007; 3. "Banda Ng Bayan" Released: May 13, 2009

Bagong Liwanag (Tagalog for "New Light") is an EP and the 11th overall album of the Filipino pop rock band, Rivermaya. It has 5 main tracks, 5 instrumental tracks and 2 audio messages which also included demos of songs from their upcoming album. It was released under Warner Music Philippines and released on August 15, 2007.

The carrier single "Sayang" was released weeks after the departure of Rico Blanco from the band after serving as the band's chief songwriter, keyboardist, guitarist and vocalist for 13 years.

== Track listing ==
No.	Title	Writer(s)	Length
1.	"Banda Ng Bayan"	Japs Sergio	4:38
2.	"Sumigaw"	Mark Escueta	2:57
3.	"Nawawala"	Mike Elgar	5:21
4.	"Olats"	Mark Escueta	3:47
5.	"Sayang"	Japs Sergio	4:39
6.	"High Speed Audio 1"		19:40
7.	"Banda Ng Bayan (Instrumental)"	Japs Sergio	4:38
8.	"Sumigaw (Instrumental)"	Mark Escueta	2:57
9.	"Nawawala (Instrumental)"	Mike Elgar	5:23
10.	"Olats (Instrumental)"	Mark Escueta	3:47
11.	"Sayang (Instrumental)"	Japs Sergio	4:40
12.	"High Speed Audio 2"		7:30

== Personnel ==
- Japs Sergio – lead vocals (tracks 1 & 5), bass, backing vocals
- Mark Escueta – lead vocals (tracks 2 & 4), drums & percussion, backing vocals
- Mike Elgar – lead vocals (track 3), guitar, keyboards, backing vocals

Additional musicians

- Champ Lui Pio – acoustic guitar (track 5)
- DJ Rodriguez – tambourine (track 5)

== Album credits ==
- Executive Producer: Revolver Music, Lizza Nakpil & Chito S. Roño
- Sound Engineer: Mark Escueta
- Assistant Sound Engineers: Mike Elgar & Japs Sergio
- Mastered By Angee Rozul at Tracks Studios
- Sleeve By Paolo Lim
- Artist Photography by Nina Sandejas
