= Rivermaya =

Filipino rock band

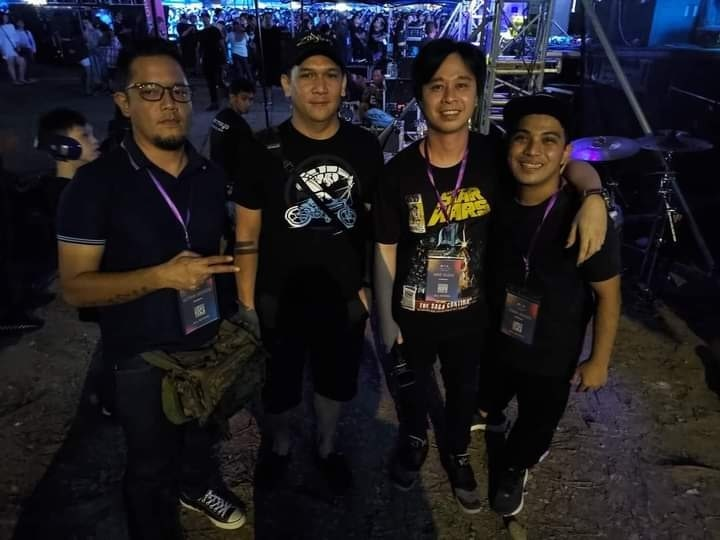
- Rivermaya in 2019 (from left to right: Nathan Azarcon, Mark Escueta, Mike Elgar, and touring member Aiman Borres)

Background information
- Origin: Metro Manila, Philippines
- Genres: Alternative rock; pop rock; hard rock; Pinoy rock
- Years active: 1994–present
- Labels: Star; Universal; BMG/Sony; Viva; Warner; Revolver
- Members: Mark Escueta; Nathan Azarcon; Clint Caballero
- Past members: Rico Blanco; Bamboo Mañalac; Perf de Castro; Mike Elgar; Japs Sergio; Kakoy Legaspi; Jayson Fernandez; Norby David; Ryan Peralta
- Website: www.rivermaya.ph

Rivermaya is a Filipino alternative rock band. Formed in 1994, it is one of the several bands that spearheaded the 1990s Philippine alternative rock explosion.

Rivermaya is currently composed of original members Mark Escueta and Nathan Azarcon. Notable former original members include chief songwriter/multi-instrumentalist Rico Blanco and vocalist Bamboo Mañalac, who later formed the band Bamboo and eventually went on his solo career.

The classic 1994–1998 quartet lineup of Mañalac, Blanco, Azarcon, and Escueta performed a major reunion concert, with the event held at the SMDC Festival Grounds in Parañaque on February 17, 2024 and produced by Live Nation Philippines. The event received positive reviews from fans and critics alike.

Rivermaya is among the top thirty best-selling artists in Philippine history.

== History ==
=== Earlier formation (1993) ===
The band's predecessor consisted of Jesse Gonzales on vocals, Kenneth Ilagan on guitars, Nathan Azarcon on bass guitar, Rome Velayo on drums, and Rico Blanco on keyboards and backing vocals whom Azarcon and Ilagan recommended to the management after hearing him play his portable piano rendition of Metallica's "Seek & Destroy" during the audition process. They were managed by Lizza Nakpil and director Chito S. Roño who had the intention of molding the group into a rock showband. The group was called Xaga.

=== Classic lineup and mainstream success (1994–2001) ===
In the process of grueling practice sessions, Azarcon's schoolmate Francisco "Bamboo" Mañalac replaced Gonzales who was asked to leave the band for not meeting expectations; Azarcon's childhood friend Mark Escueta replaced Velayo who no-showed and left shortly after sensing he is not fit with the group's musical style, and Ilagan (a family friend of Roño), who eventually left the band later on for personal reasons concerning his studies, was replaced by Perfecto "Perf" de Castro who owned the rehearsal studio where the band used to jam. With Ilagan leaving and de Castro as the new guitarist, the band members disbanded Xaga and formed the band Rivermaya. The name "River" was already in place, as mutually agreed by the whole band, while the added "maya", to serve as a distinction, was said to be initially coined by Blanco which was then strongly suggested and vouched by de Castro to Nakpil. With the exception of Blanco, de Castro and Azarcon, who were aged 20, 19, and 18, respectively, Mañalac and Escueta were both minors when they signed up with the band (both aged 17). They started putting together original songs like "Ulan" [Rain], "214", and "Awit ng Kabataan" [Song of the Youth] (mostly composed by Rico Blanco) in demo form for prospective recording companies.

By November 1994, the band had released its first album, the self-titled Rivermaya, and its first single was "Ulan"; followed by "214". Both songs were critically acclaimed.

Citing artistic differences with the management, Perf de Castro was adamant in leaving the group in late 1995 in the middle of recording of their second studio album and returned to his project band "The Blues Trio", a band later renamed "Axis" until its final inception as "Triaxis." The band continued as a quartet and Rico Blanco became the full-time guitarist while Nathan Azarcon's friend Edward Alfafara filled in as session additional guitar player on live shows for the remainder of the year until he was replaced by J-John Valencia (also a friend of Azarcon) in 1996.

The band's second album, Trip, released in 1996, contains the singles "Kisapmata" [Blink of an Eye], "Himala" [Miracle], "Flowers", "Princess of Disguise" and "Panahon Na Naman" [It's Time Once Again]. Whilce Portacio, co-creator of the X-Men's "Bishop" and co-founder of Image Comics, illustrated the album art for Trip.

On January 31, 1997, the band released its third album, Atomic Bomb, with the single "Hinahanap-hanap Kita" [Always Wanting to See You]. The album gained positive responses from listeners and received heavy airplay from radio stations. In October 1998, Rivermaya also released the Rivermaya Remixed album, put together with the help of DJ Toti Dalmacion of Groove Nation.

==== Departure of Bamboo Mañalac (1998) ====
The band then embarked on a US and Canada tour in 1998. Despite the band's successful tour, it was also at this time that Bamboo Mañalac decided to stay in the U.S. with his family, and also to finish his studies. His last show with the band was on October 10, 1998, in Oakland, CA. He eventually went on to form his eponymous band upon his return to the Philippines in 2003.

Rivermaya decided to forge on, with Rico Blanco taking on lead vocals and released their fourth album, It's Not Easy Being Green on January 15, 1999, containing the singles "Nerbyoso" [Nervous], "Shattered Like", and "Rodeo". the album hits Gold barely a month after the album was released.

On January 22, 2000, the band performed at the Nescafe's Open Up concert in Baguio City with Mike Hanopol. On June 30, 2000, the band performed at Channel [V] Philippines Concert for Peace at the University of the Philippines (UP) Sunken Garden.

The band appeared on the cover of the May 2000 issue of Pulp Magazine.

On August 30, 2000, the band released its fifth studio album, aptly called Free. entirely for free on the Internet as well as on CDs distributed at their gigs. Free went on to be named "Album of the Year" at the NU Rock Awards and Rico Blanco winning Producer of the Year for producing the album and Teeth's "I was a Teenage Tree" album.

=== Second evolution of lineup (2001–2007) ===
In April 2001, Nathan Azarcon departed from the group to focus on other musical interests (later revealed he got kicked out due to serious unruly behavior off-screen), leaving Rico Blanco and Mark Escueta as remaining members. Japs Sergio (from Daydream Cycle) filled in on Azarcon's position in gigs. They were later signed with Viva Records and released an EP "Alab ng Puso" [Passion of the Heart] in June 2001, an original soundtrack for the film Buhay Kamao which starred Robin Padilla. The EP also featured a remix by Raimund Marasigan's Squid 9. By Summer of 2001, J-John Valencia (who had been a session guitarist for the band since 1996) has left the band. Diego Mapa of Cambio and Pedicab was considered to be hired and fill in as an additional guitarist for the band but did not make the cut. By May 2001, the lineup was officially changed as they recruited familiar local guitar heroes, Victor "Kakoy" Legaspi (from blues band Mr. Crayon) and Mike Elgar (from 7 Foot Junior), with Sergio officially absorbed in the band as well. They later began writing songs recording for their 6th studio album. The new line-up made its first performance at NU Pocket Concerts in Alabang Town Center on June 2, 2001. It would allow Rico Blanco to handle vocal duties full-time during live shows.

By August 2001, the band had finished recording for their 6th studio album, Tuloy ang Ligaya, which was released on October 15, 2001 ['The Fun Continues'] and released singles including "Umaaraw, Umuulan" [Sometimes It Shines, Sometimes It Rains] and "Wag Na Init Ulo, Baby" [Don't Be Mad Anymore, Baby]. Their music videos won the Favorite Group Video in the MTV Pilipinas Music Award in 2002 and 2003, respectively. The video for "Wag Na Init Ulo, Baby" won a special award for Highest Jump in the same event in 2003.

The band appeared on the cover again of Pulp Magazine in the October–November 2001 issue.

On December 8, 2001, the band also performed at the Fort (also known as Bonifacio Global City) to celebrate Pulp Magazine's 2nd Anniversary also dubbed as "The Freakshow".

On August 3, 2002, the band opened for the English new wave band the Lotus Eaters for their concert at Rockwell Club Tent, Makati City.

In September 2003, the band announced a US tour to promote the album Tuloy ang Ligaya.

On October 10, 2003, they released their 7th studio album, Between the Stars and the Waves, containing the singles "A Love to Share", "Balisong" [Butterfly Knife], "Sunday Driving", "Table for Two", "241", and "Atat" [Eager]. A Special Edition of the album were released in December 2004 featuring 2 new songs "Liwanag Sa Dilim" and the acoustic version of the song.

==== International success (2004–2007) ====
The band were nominated in the MTV Asia Awards 2004 for Favorite Artist Philippines, which was won by Parokya ni Edgar.

In mid-2004, Legaspi resigned from the band for undisclosed reasons. He then later performed as a session player with other musicians such as Julianne Tarroja, and Peryodiko, among others, thus, the band became a four-piece line-up once again and has been that ever since during the mid-2000s Pinoy rock era. In July of that same year, the band released a jingle for and became the endorser of Greenwich Pizza; the limited physical CD featuring their jingle was available in every outlet of the pizza chain.

On February 5, 2005, the band won Favorite Artist Philippines in MTV Asia Awards 2005.

The band found a variety of partners who commissioned such works as "Liwanag sa Dilim" [Light In The Dark], "Posible" [Possible] (Southeast Asian Games' Athletes Anthem), released on November 7, 2005, "Makaasa Ka" (from Globe), released on July 16, 2005, and "You'll Be Safe Here".

"You'll Be Safe Here", originally created as the theme for the ABS-CBN TV series Spirits was released as an EP by Warner Music Philippines and became the song that MTV Asia selected for performance at the 2006 Asia Awards. Kelly Rowland of Destiny's Child introduced the group, and they were backed up by Thailand’s Royal Symphony Orchestra during their live performance. It was the first time that a Filipino band was invited to perform in the event.

An album of compiled works, also titled You'll Be Safe Here, was distributed in Singapore, Thailand, Malaysia, and Indonesia.

Rivermaya embarked on a series of Asian tours, including at Thailand's Pattaya Music Fest (2005, 2008, 2009) as well as Singapore's Mosaic Festival (run by The Esplanade); and Bangkok's Fat Fest as well as in Indonesia's MTV Staying Alive show. In the Philippines, on December 13, 2005, the band released a compilation album called Greatest Hits 2006 album. The album hit gold award at February 2006, followed by an album dedicated to its music heroes: Isang Ugat, Isang Dugo ['One Vein, One Blood'] released on October 10, 2006. At the end of March 2007, Rivermaya scored again another first for the Philippines as their videos, "You'll Be Safe Here" and the recent video remake "Balisong" were chosen as the first Asian artists to have full-length music videos featured on the Star World Channel.

Also during this time, Rivermaya has been often referred to as "Banda ng Bayan" [The Band of the Nation], a nickname they share with Parokya ni Edgar.

==== Departure of Rico Blanco (2007) ====
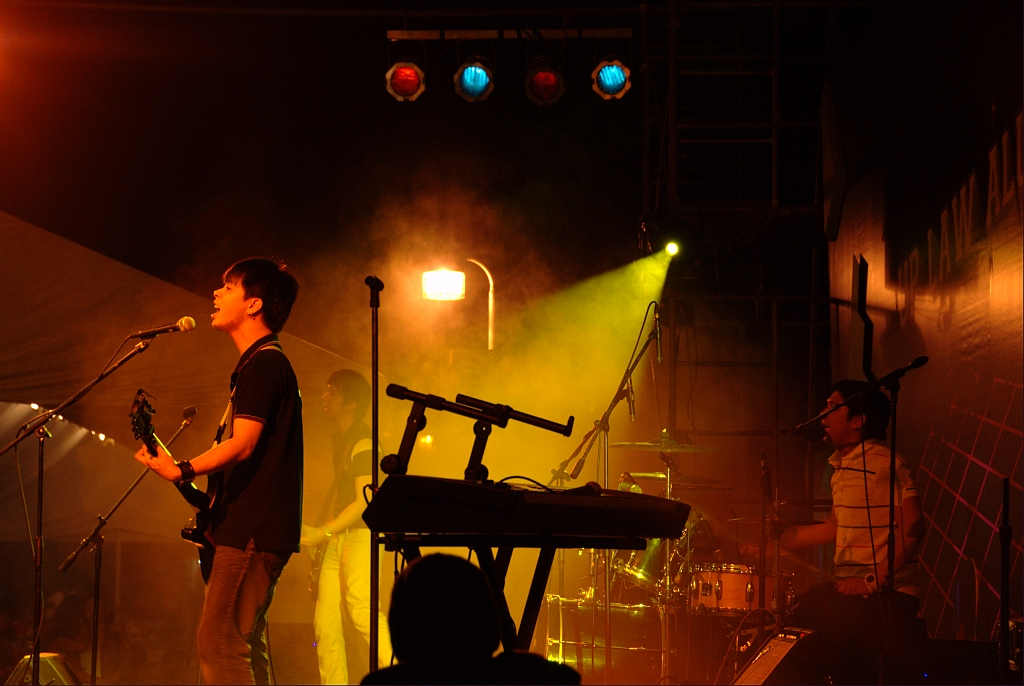
Rivermaya (Elgar, Sergio, and Escueta) performing at U.P. Diliman (2007) following the departure of Rico Blanco

On May 24, 2007, Rico Blanco officially announced his departure from the group citing personal reasons. His last performance with the band was on May 4, 2007, at the Metro Bar. Despite the rumors that the band would eventually disband, both Rivermaya and its management denied the rumors as a result.

After Rico Blanco left, Rivermaya released a new single, "Sayang" [Such a Waste], penned and sung by Japs Sergio and described by the band as "an open letter to the fans", the single premiered on June 22, 2007. In addition, Studio 23 announced the selection of Rivermaya to create the new theme song for the station. The new song is titled "Sumigaw" [Shout] and marks the release of a second single in two months for the band, accelerating Rivermaya's pace for new songs rapidly (in previous years, the band had managed to release only a single every 12 months).

On August 11, 2007, during a mini press conference held at Mogwai Bar and Café in Cubao's Marikina Shoe Expo, Rivermaya released its all-new 5-song Bagong Liwanag ['New Light'] EP, which hit stores nationwide starting August 15. This 5-song EP is released on the band's own label, Revolver Music, and licensed to Warner Music Philippines.

=== Third evolution of lineup (2007–2012) ===
On August 24–25, 2007, The band held a two-day audition for a new vocalist. The auditions was televised on Studio 23, which was titled Bagong Liwanag. Aside from the band members, main judges are Rivermaya manager Lizza Nakpil, The Dawn guitarist Francis Reyes, and Razorback bassist Louie Talan. On October 24, 2007, then-18-year-old Jayson Fernandez (usually spelled as "Jason") was announced as the winner and new member of Rivermaya.

On December 7, 2007, the band opened for the American alternative rock band Vertical Horizon in their concert at the Araneta Coliseum.

On January 21, 2008, Rivermaya released the album entitled Buhay ['Life'] with the carrier single "Sugal ng Kapalaran" [Gamble of Fate] penned by Sergio with both Fernandez and Sergio doing the vocals, while Elgar and Escueta do backing vocals. During this time, the band parted ways with manager-director Chito Roño and Lizza Nakpil.

On May 30, 2008, the band opened for the American pop rock band The Click Five in their concert at the Araneta Coliseum.

Rivermaya has played in Singapore at the Marina Bay New Year Countdown on December 31, 2008, while in September 2009, the group is the first Filipino band invited to perform on 3 different stages at the 2009 Formula 1 Singapore Grand Prix. and in the same month and year, the band released the album Closest Thing to Heaven with the track "Dangal" [Dignity] as the carrier single.

On January 9, 2010, the band opened for Ne-Yo in his concert at SM Mall of Asia Concert Ground. Also, the band announced a nationwide album tour.

==== Band name ownership disputes (2008–2009) ====
After allegedly discovering several acts of misappropriation of funds involving the bands' royalties and talent fees, then Rivermaya band members announced that the band had parted ways with their longtime manager Lizza G. Nakpil on October 29, 2008. She was charged with the crime of estafa, sued for damages, and the court issued a Writ of Preliminary Injunction forbidding further contact with Rivermaya. Also in October 2008, longtime member Mark Escueta filed his own application at the Intellectual Property Office (IPO), solely in his name for Rivermaya but was rejected by the IPO. In August 2009, a decision of the IPO confirmed that the "Rivermaya" name ownership of the trademark belongs to Nakpil. However, in October of the same year, Escueta was granted with a Temporary Restraining Order (TRO) issued by the Regional Trial Court of Lucena City. The TRO prevents Nakpil from claiming sole ownership of the "Rivermaya" band name while the case and appeal issued by both parties are still being studied by the court, thus allowing Escueta to continue using the band name regardless of the IPO decision as there was no Entry of Judgment/Execution that has been issued. On November 15, 2012, the Bureau of Legal Affairs of the Intellectual Property Office posted a notice of order stating that Nakpil had come to an agreement with the band members to withdraw her pending application for registration of the name Rivermaya and not to hinder the application of the aforementioned name filed by Escueta.

==== Departure of Jayson Fernandez and Japs Sergio (2011–2012) ====
On February 22, 2011, Rivermaya's official Facebook page announced that they would release their music video titled "Remenis" [Reminisce] and the music video was released on February 28 on Myx Channel. On August 28, 2011, Jayson Fernandez left Rivermaya after 4 years with the group citing musical differences as the primary reason. Paolo Valenciano (son of Gary Valenciano) of Salamin, Pochoy Labog of Malay and Dicta License, and Vinci Montaner of Parokya ni Edgar are among the notable personalities who simultaneously filled in as temporary lead vocalists for some occasional gigs weeks after Fernandez's departure. After taking a brief hiatus, in November 2012, Japs Sergio posted on his official Facebook page that he left Rivermaya, in order to pursue his new band, Peso Movement.

=== Fourth evolution of lineup (2012–2016) ===
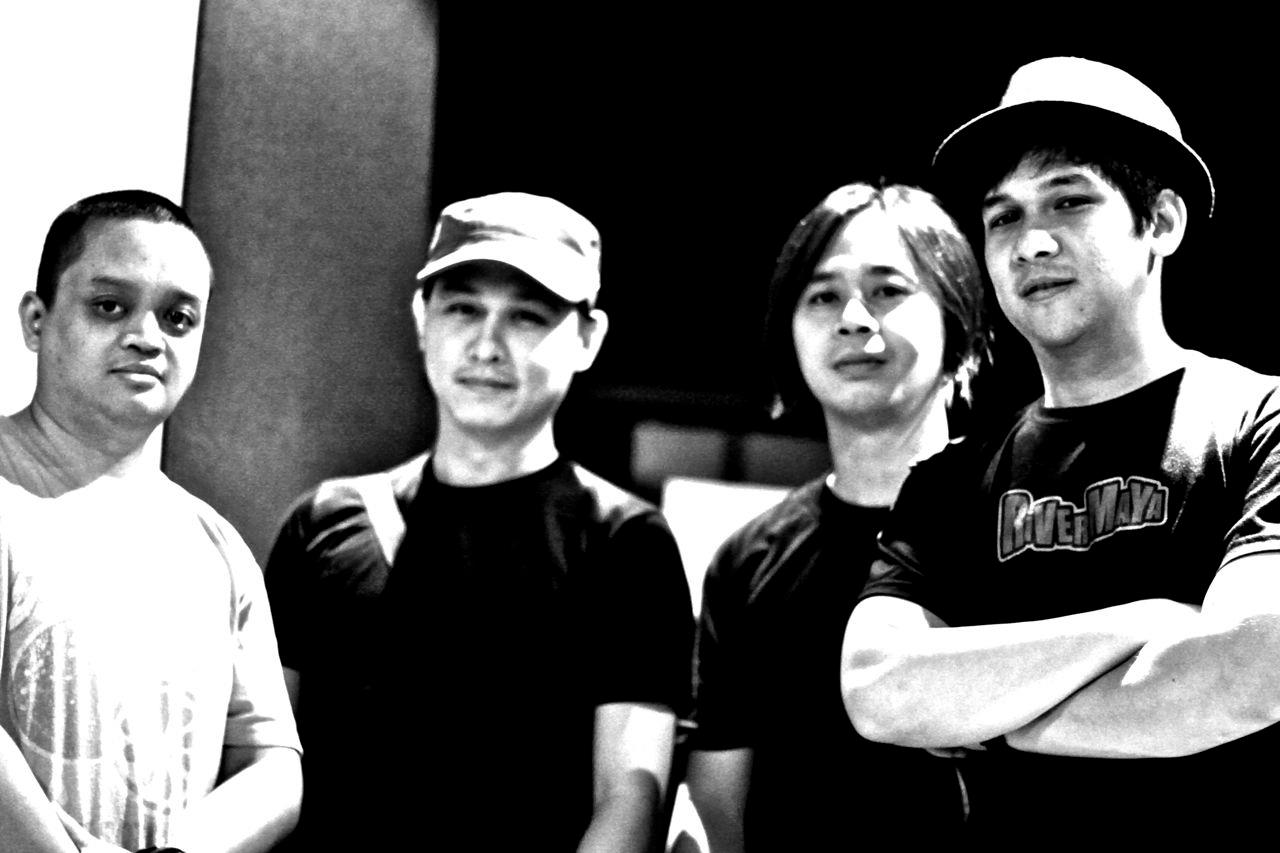
Rivermaya line-up from 2012-2016; David left the band in 2016 while Peralta left in 2018.

In 2012, on a gig at Hard Rock Cafe, the band formally introduce their new members, Ryan Peralta who was the band's regular session player and Norby David of the band Overtone. During this time, Mark Escueta, Mike Elgar and Norby David simultaneously switched over the lead vocal duties.

==== Panatang Makabanda and mini reunion (2012–2016) ====
In February 2013, the band released the single "Pilipinas, Kailan Ka Magigising" to promote their upcoming album.

On March 19, 2013, Rivermaya released the album Panatang Makabanda ['Pledge of Allegiance of a Band Passionate'] and a repackaged edition was released on January 15, 2015.

On May 8, 2013, the band opened for the American rock band Aerosmith in their Concert at SM Mall of Asia Arena.

On 2014, the band collaborated with Khomeini Bansuan on the song "Kapayapaan" which was used as a theme song for the Movie "Magnum. 357" which is an official entry to the 2014 Metro Manila Film Festival.

On January 9, 2016, members from the original classic line-up consisting of Perf de Castro, Nathan Azarcon, Mark Escueta, and Rico Blanco were reunited at 19 East in Muntinlupa after receiving an invitation from de Castro following one of his gigs. The event also coincided with Escueta's 40th birthday. The performance, which they described as a "surprise mini semi-reunion," featured Rico Blanco on keyboards, de Castro on guitar, Azarcon on bass, and Escueta on drums. Blanco and de Castro took turns on lead vocals throughout the set, while Azarcon and Escueta provided backing vocals. Bamboo Mañalac was also invited, but reports indicated he was out of the country at the time. Mike Elgar and Ryan Peralta were reportedly backstage, watching the original members perform.

=== Fifth evolution of lineup (2016–present) ===
==== Departure of David and return of Azarcon (2016) ====
On February 12, 2016, the band released the music video of their fifth and final single for the Panatang Makabanda album, "Tayo", on Facebook and later uploaded on YouTube on March 9, 2016. On March 6, 2016, bassist and vocalist Norby David posted a statement on Facebook that he quit the band primarily claiming it was ultimately a lack of communication as the reason for his departure. Days after his departure, former members Japs Sergio and Nathan Azarcon took over bass duties in live shows. Later on, Azarcon have permanently replaced David and returned full-time to the band after 15 years.

==== Sa Kabila ng Lahat and departure of Ryan Peralta (2016–2018) ====
In mid-2016, the band began recording for their upcoming 13th studio at Tower of Doom Studios in Diliman, Quezon City with former member Japs Sergio co-producing the album. On May 22, 2017, the band signed with ABS-CBN-owned record label Star Music and later announced that it will release its 13th studio album, Sa Kabila ng Lahat. The first single, "Manila" was released on June 14, 2017. On September 7, 2017, the band released a lyric video of their second single, "8 to 5". The album was released on September 15 on all digital platforms nationwide and an album tour was also announced.

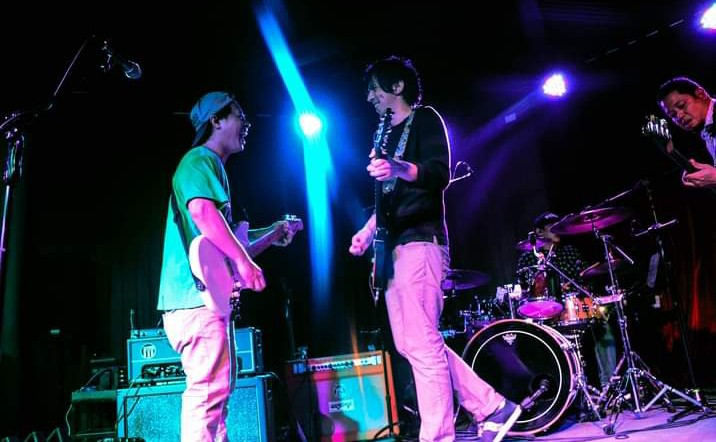
Rivermaya performing on a gig in 2018. From left to right: Elgar on guitars, Japs Sergio on guitars (as a session player), Escueta on drums, and Azarcon on bass.

On February 10, 2018, the band performed on the Playback Music Festival at Circuit Grounds, Makati. Also on the same year, the band was chosen to represent the Philippines to perform in the 16th Soundrenaline Music Festival, one of the biggest music festival on Indonesia. In late 2018, Peralta voluntarily left the band in good terms prompting Escueta to switch back to playing drums.

==== Present status (2019–present) ====
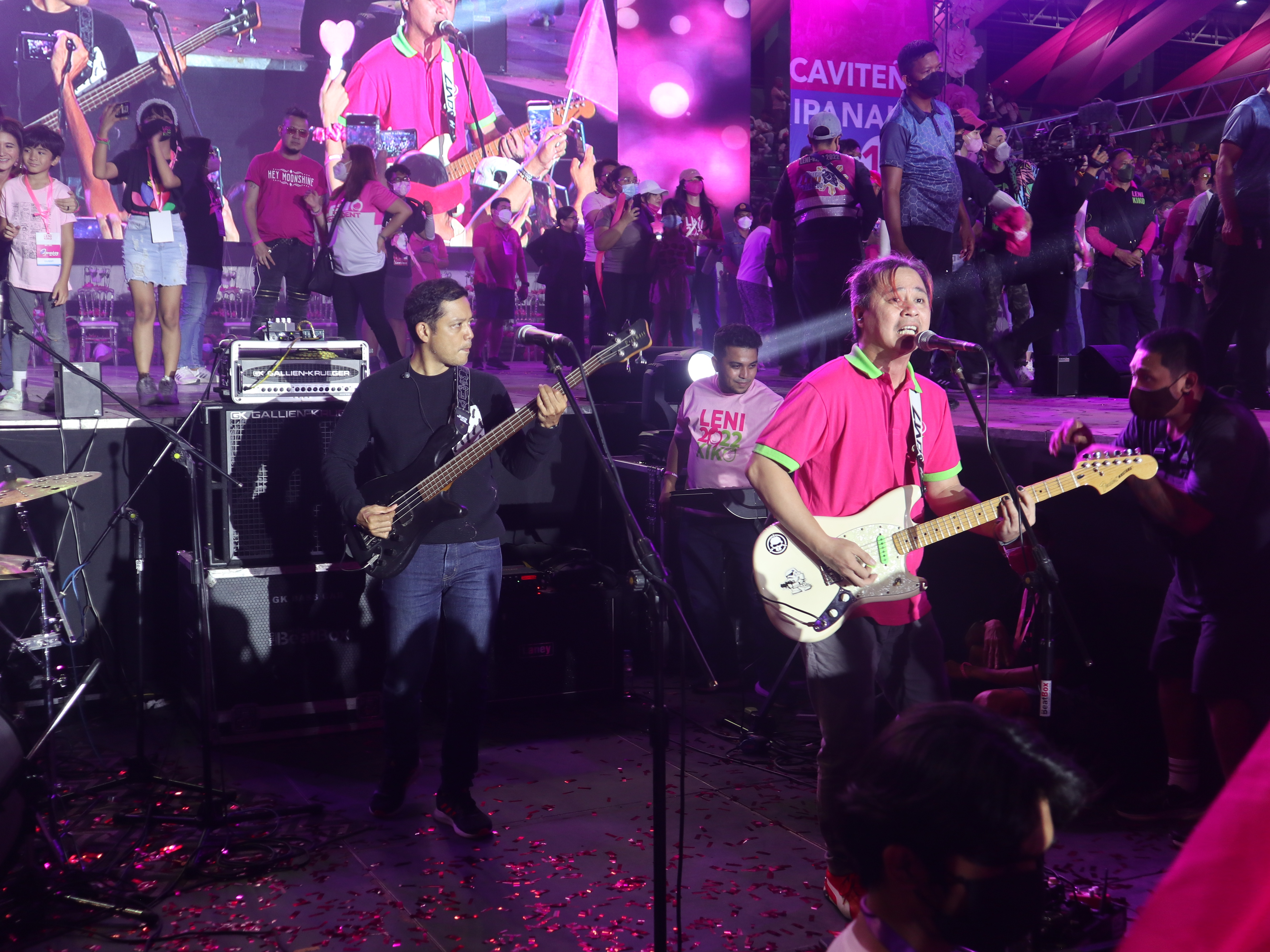
Rivermaya performing at a Leni-Kiko rally in 2022.

On May 15, 2019, Rivermaya was honored as the newest MYX Magna Award 2019 recipient for their contribution in the OPM rock band scene and was the 3rd OPM rock band honored and who won the award after Eraserheads in 2012 and Parokya Ni Edgar in 2014, respectively. On May 7, 2022, the band release a lyric video of their new single "Casino", their first single since 2018, followed by a Music Video released on May 12, 2022.

The band was inducted in the Eastwood City Walk of Fame on March 6, 2024 represented by Escueta, Azarcon and former member Kakoy Legaspi. Elgar was reportedly out of the country taking a vacation leave during the event. Former member Japs Sergio was also invited to the event but was not able to make it; he instead posted a message of gratitude in his official Facebook account the following day.

On May 8, 2024, Rivermaya updated the display picture on their official Facebook account, showing only Escueta and Azarcon. This sparked speculation among fans that Elgar might have left the band, although no official announcement has been made by either the band’s management or Elgar himself. Elgar is the longest-serving guitarist in the band's history.

===== Rivermaya: The Reunion concert of the classic lineup (2024–2025) =====
On October 31, 2023, concert producer Live Nation Philippines posted a five-second teaser showing blurred images resembling classic Rivermaya members Rico Blanco, Bamboo Mañalac, Mark Escueta, and Nathan Azarcon. Less than a week later, on November 6, it was confirmed that the four are set for the much-anticipated reunion concert to be held at SMDC Festival Grounds on February 17, 2024. Meanwhile, an overwhelming number of fans aired their disappointment online after noticing the absence of Perf de Castro from the promotional materials. De Castro himself then posted in his social media accounts confirming that he will not be a part of the reunion concert as he was not approached by the producers of the show. De Castro also urged the fans to enjoy the upcoming show even though he will not be there. In a separate interview with Mark Escueta on Raymund Marasigan's podcast dated February 8, 2024, he mentioned that Live Nation made it clear to them from the beginning that the producer's original plan all along is that only the four out of the five from the "classic lineup" (sans de Castro) will be participating in the "reunion concert" since the scope that Live Nation wanted to focus on was the lineup from the band's second and third studio albums. Escueta added and clarified that Mike Elgar is still part of the band's present lineup but will be having a vacation leave for the meantime.

On February 17, 2024, Rico Blanco, Nathan Azarcon, Mark Escueta, and Bamboo Mañalac, performed an almost three-hour show at the SMDC Festival Grounds in Aseana City, Tambo, Parañaque City. The concert was presented by Live Nation Philippines with the band playing most of the songs from their second and third albums (Trip and Atomic Bomb, respectively), a few songs from their first/debut self-titled album, Mañalac's take on the song "Nerbyoso" from the album It's Not Easy Being Green, and a solo performance from Blanco of the song "You'll Be Safe Here".

On February 22, 2024, Escueta posted on his official Facebook page that the "classic lineup reunion" will be having a North American tour to be called Rivermaya: The Reunion Tour and to be presented by Tiana Entertainment. The U.S. and Canada tour were held between September 8, 2024 and October 6, 2024 as the first and last shows respectively. Due to the success of the North American tour, the same "classic lineup" returned for a World tour which began at February 9, 2025 and toured in Dubai, Qatar and Saudi Arabia.

== Members ==
Current members

- Mark Escueta – co-lead vocals (2011–present, occasional lead 2007–2011); drums (1994–2011, 2018–present); percussion, backing vocals (1994–present); guitars (2011–2018, occasional 2007–2011)
- Nathan Azarcon – co-lead vocals (2016–present); bass guitar, backing vocals (1994–2001, 2016–present)

Current regular touring members

- Aiman Borres – keyboards, keytar, synths (2017–present)
- Dan Billano – co-lead vocals, guitars (2025–present)
- Clint Caballero – guitars (2025–present)

Former members

- Rico Blanco – lead vocals (1998–2007; occasional touring 2024–2025); co-lead and backing vocals (1994–1998; occasional touring 2024–2025); guitars, keyboards, synths (1994–2007; occasional touring 2024–2025)
- Bamboo Mañalac – lead vocals (1994–1998, occasional touring 2024–2025)
- Perf de Castro – guitars, backing vocals (1994–1995; occasional guesting 2019–present)
- Mike Elgar – co-lead vocals (2011–2024); guitars, backing vocals (2001–2024); keyboards (2007–2011) — currently on hiatus since 2024
- Kakoy Legaspi – guitars (2001–2004; touring 2007–2008)
- Japs Sergio – bass guitar, occasional lead and backing vocals, occasional guitars (2001–2012; touring 2016)
- Jayson Fernandez – lead vocals, guitars (2007–2011)
- Norby David – co-lead vocals, bass guitar, occasional guitars (2011–2016)
- Ryan Peralta – drums, percussion, keyboards (2011–2018; touring 1998, 2008–2011)

Notable former touring members

- Edward Alfafara – guitars (1995–1996)
- J-John Valencia – guitars (1996–2001)
- Martin Jamora – keyboards (1998–1999)
- Kettle Mata – co-lead vocals, guitars (2024–2025)

=== Gallery of Notable Former Members ===
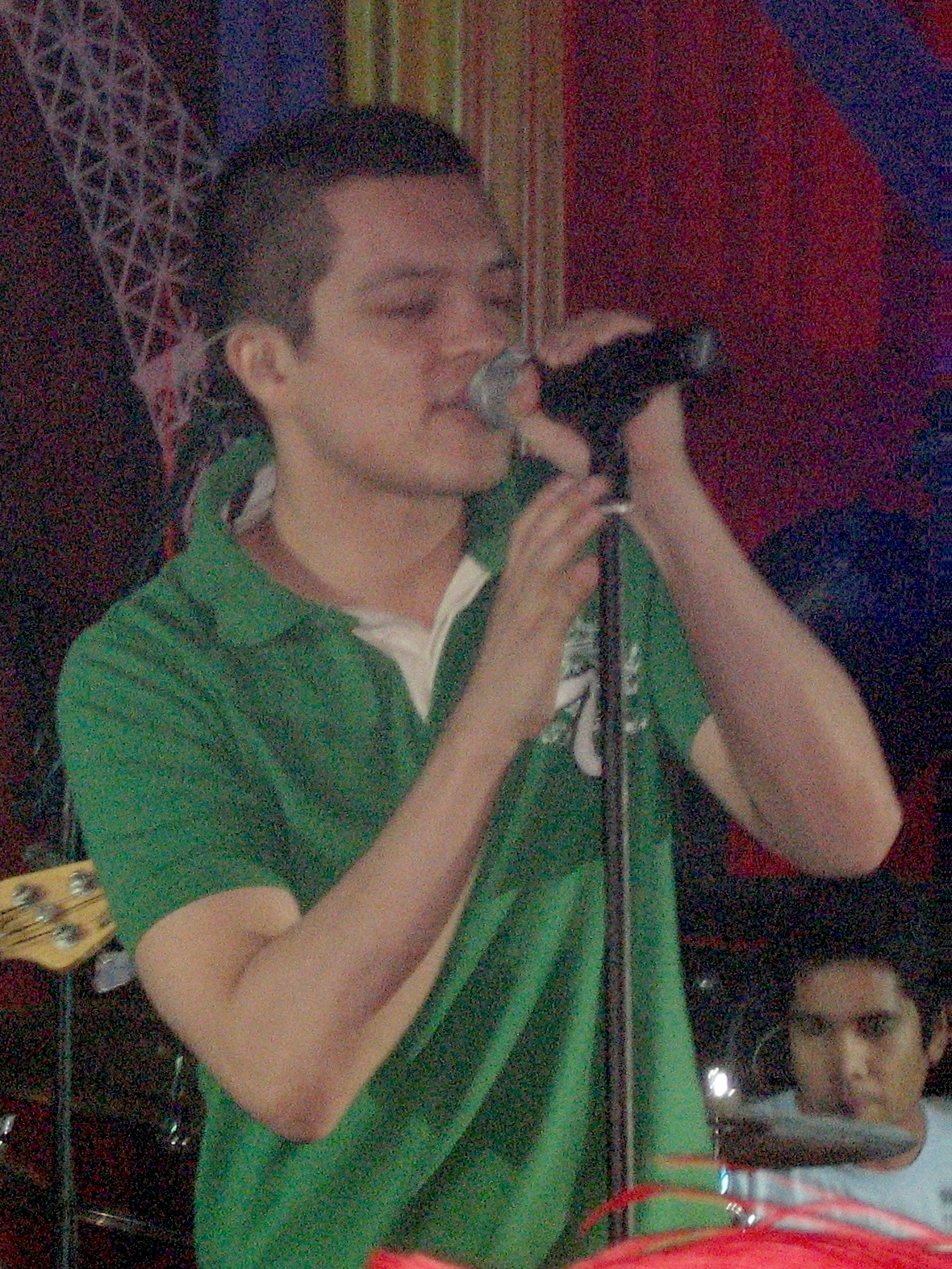
Bamboo Mañalac was the band's lead vocalist from 1994 to 1998 and its original frontman.

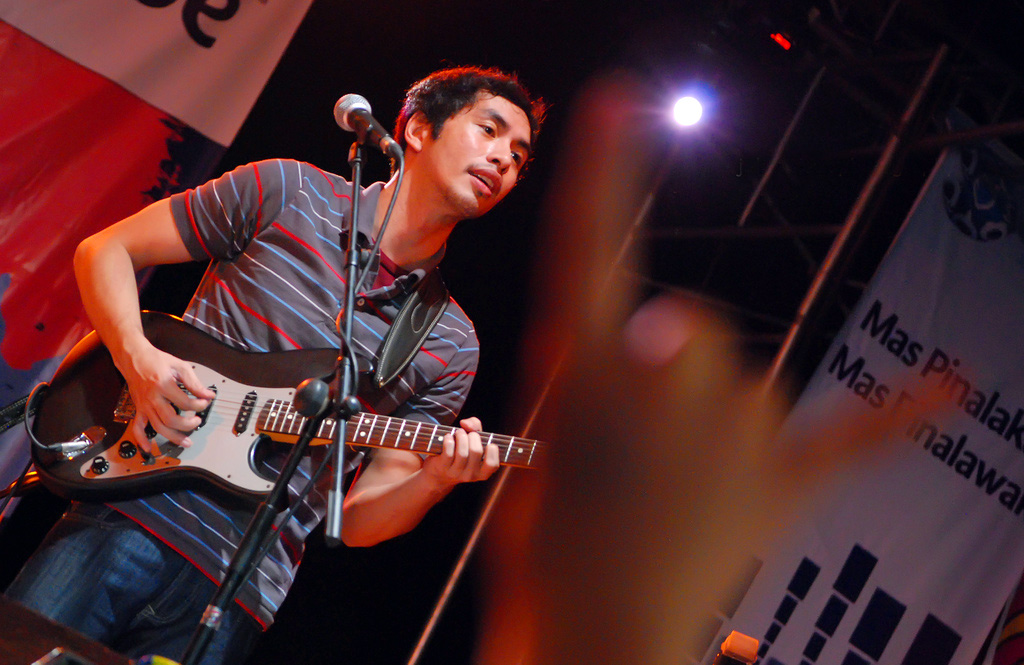
Rico Blanco, the chief composer and lyricist of the band; he was the band's keyboardist/guitarist and backing vocalist by the time the debut album was released. He later became the band's sole full-time guitarist when Perf de Castro left a year after their debut album was released & later became the band's frontman after Bamboo's departure in 1998. He left in 2007.

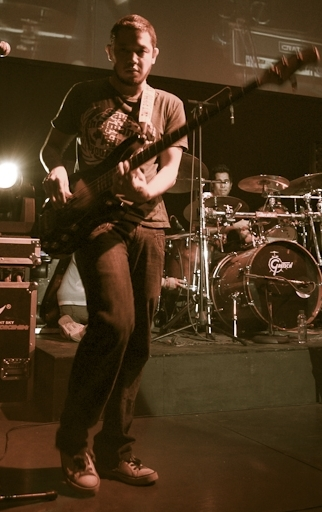
Bassist Nathan Azarcon was one of the original members of Rivermaya from 1994 to 2001. He eventually returned in 2016.

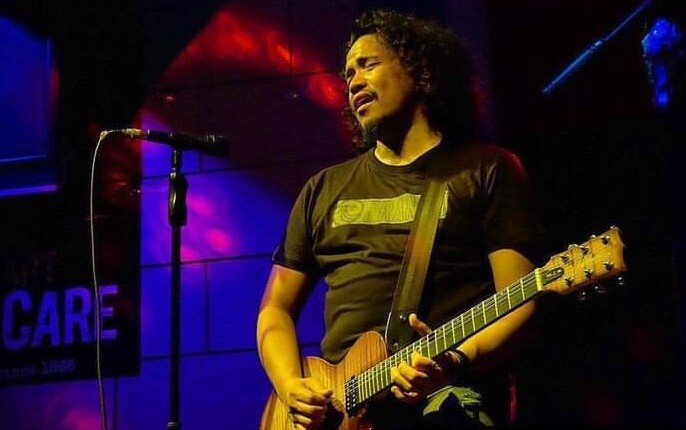
Perf de Castro was the band's original lead guitarist from 1994 to 1995. He left the band after a year from its inception and release of their first album.

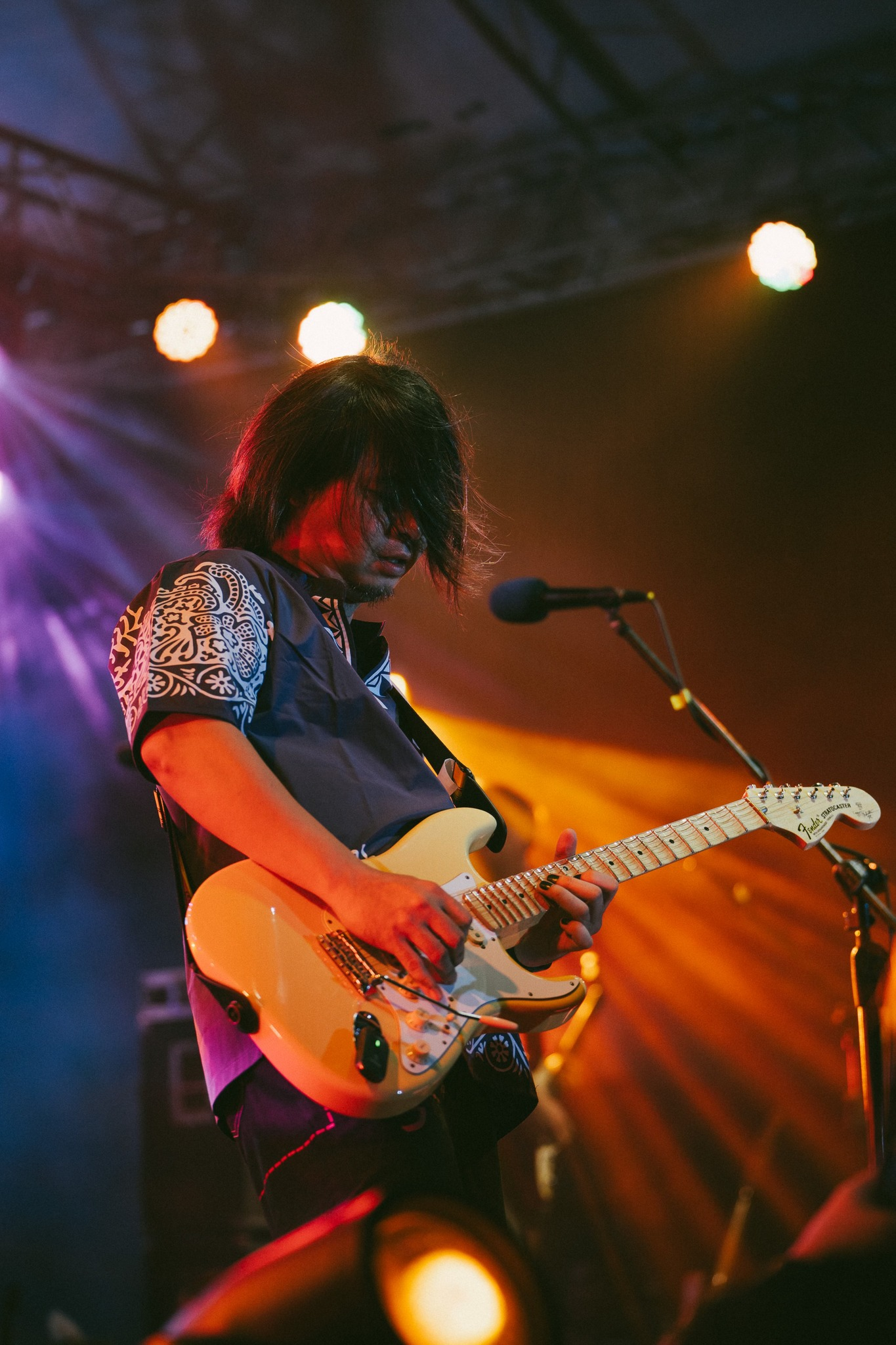
Mike Elgar was the longest-serving guitarist of Rivermaya, from 2001 to 2024.

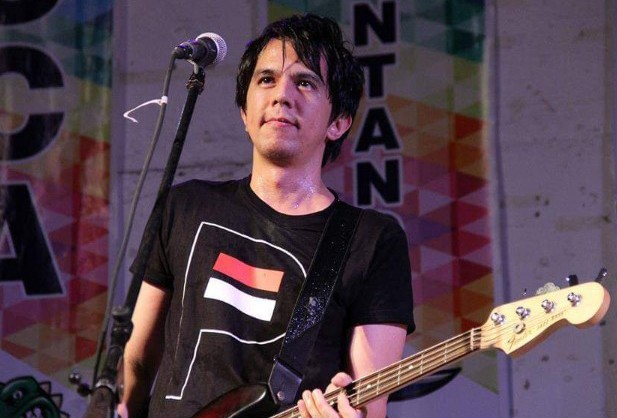
Japs Sergio replaced Nathan Azarcon when the latter left in 2001. Sergio amicably left the band in 2012.

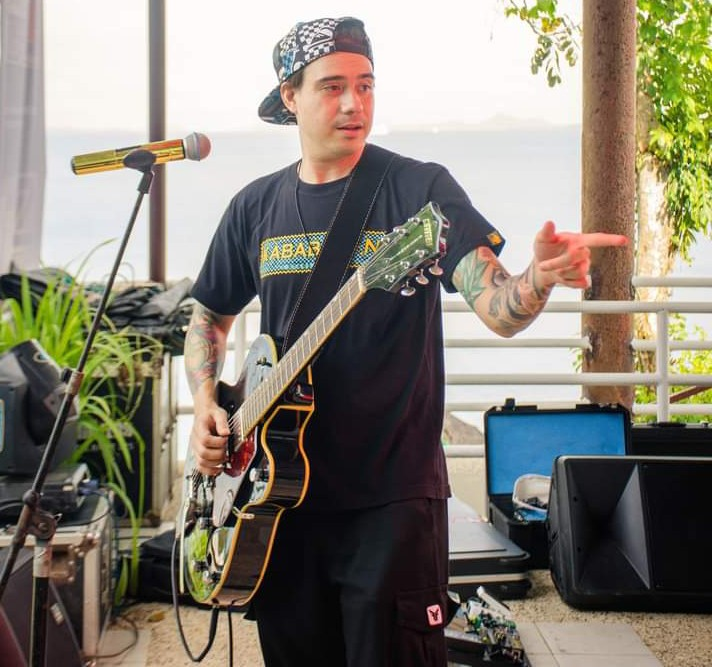
Jayson Fernandez served as the lead vocalist after Blanco's departure from 2007 to 2011. Fernandez eventually joined the second season of The Voice of the Philippines in 2014 and became a runner-up in Tawag ng Tanghalan Celebrity Champions in 2019.

== Discography ==
For a full, detailed list, see: Rivermaya discography

- Rivermaya (1994)
- Trip (1996)
- Atomic Bomb (1997)
- It's Not Easy Being Green (1999)
- Free (2000)
- Tuloy ang Ligaya (2001)
- Between the Stars and Waves (2003)
- You'll Be Safe Here (EP) (2005)
- Isang Ugat, Isang Dugo (2006)
- Bagong Liwanag (EP) (2007)
- Buhay (2008)
- Closest Thing to Heaven (2009)
- Panatang Makabanda (2013)
- Sa Kabila ng Lahat (2017)

== Awards and nominations ==
| Year | Award giving body | Category | Nominated work | Results |
|---|---|---|---|---|
| 1996 | RX 93.1 Year End Countdown | Song of the Year | "Himala" | Won |
| 1996 | NU Rock Awards | Vocalist of the Year | (for Bamboo Mañalac) | Nominated |
| 1996 | NU Rock Awards | Bassist of the Year | (for Nathan Azarcon) | Nominated |
| 1996 | NU Rock Awards | Keyboardist of the Year | (for Rico Blanco) | Nominated |
| 1996 | NU Rock Awards | Drummer of the Year | (for Mark Escueta) | Nominated |
| 1996 | NU Rock Awards | Album of the Year | "Trip" | Nominated |
| 1996 | NU Rock Awards | Best Album Cover | "Trip" | Nominated |
| 1996 | NU Rock Awards | Music Video of the Year | "Himala" | Nominated |
| 1996 | NU Rock Awards | Best Live Act | —N/a | Nominated |
| 1996 | NU Rock Awards | Artist of the Year | —N/a | Nominated |
| 1997 | RX 93.1 Year End Countdown | Band of the Year | —N/a | Won |
| 1998 | 4th Katha Music Awards | Best Rock Performance by a Duo or Group with Vocal | "Kung Ayaw Mo, Huwag Mo" | Nominated |
| 1999 | 12th Awit Awards | Best Album Packaging | "Nathan Azarcon & John Joel Lopez for (Remixed)" | Won |
| 1999 | Nu Rock Awards | Best Music Video | "Rodeo" | Nominated |
| 2000 | NU Rock Awards | Album of the Year | "Free" | Won |
| 2000 | NU Rock Awards | Producer of the Year | "Rico Blanco" | Won |
| 2000 | NU Rock Awards | Guitarist of the Year | (for Rico Blanco) | Nominated |
| 2001 | NU Rock Awards | Song Of the Year | "Ambulansya" | Nominated |
| 2001 | 7th Katha Awards | Best Rock Composition | "Faithless" | Won |
| 2001 | 7th Katha Awards | Best Rock Album | "Free" | Won |
| 2002 | 15th Awit Awards | Best Alternative Recording Artist | "Umaaraw, Umuulan" | Won |
| 2002 | NU Rock Awards | Artist of The Year | —N/a | Nominated |
| 2002 | NU Rock Awards | Song of the Year | "Umaaraw, Umuulan" | Nominated |
| 2002 | NU Rock Awards | Best Rock Video of the Year | "Umaaraw, Umuulan" | Nominated |
| 2002 | NU Rock Awards | Producer of the Year | "Rico Blanco" | Nominated |
| 2002 | NU Rock Awards | Album of the Year | "Tuloy Ang Ligaya" | Nominated |
| 2002 | NU Rock Awards | Best Album Packaging | "Tuloy Ang Ligaya" | Nominated |
| 2002 | NU Rock Awards | Vocalist of the Year | (for Rico Blanco) | Nominated |
| 2002 | NU Rock Awards | Guitarist of the Year | (for Mike Elgar & Kakoi Legaspi) | Nominated |
| 2002 | NU Rock Awards | Bassists of the Year | (for Japs Sergio) | Nominated |
| 2002 | NU Rock Awards | Drummer of the Year | (for Mark Escueta) | Nominated |
| 2002 | MTV Pilipinas Music Award | Best Director | Lyle Sacris for "Umaaraw, Umuulan" | Won |
| 2002 | MTV Pilipinas Music Award | Video of the Year | "Umaaraw, Umuulan" | Won |
| 2002 | MTV Pilipinas Music Award | Favorite Group Video | "Umaaraw, Umuulan" | Won |
| 2002 | MTV Pilipinas Music Award | Favorite Song | "Umaaraw, Umuulan" | Nominated |
| 2002 | 8th Katha Award | Best Rock Song | "Alab ng Puso & Umaaraw, Umuulan" | Nominated |
| 2002 | 8th Katha Award | Best Engineered Recording | "Alab ng Puso & Umaaraw, Umuulan" | Nominated |
| 2002 | 8th Katha Award | Best Rock Song Vocal Performance | "Alab ng Puso" | Nominated |
| 2003 | 16th Awit Awards | Best Engineered Recording | Angee Rozul for (Faithless) | Won |
| 2003 | MTV Pilipinas Music Award | Favorite Group Video | "Wag Na Init Ulo Baby" | Won |
| 2003 | MTV Pilipinas Music Award | Favorite Song | "Wag Na Init Ulo Baby" | Nominated |
| 2003 | MTV Pilipinas Music Award | Best Director | Lyle Sacris for "Wag Na Init Ulo Baby" | Nominated |
| 2004 | MTV Asia Awards | Favorite Artist: Philippines | —N/a | Nominated |
| 2004 | 17th Awit Awards | Best Performance by A Group Recording Artists | "A Love to Share" | Nominated |
| 2004 | MTV Pilipinas Music Award | Favorite Group Video | "A Love to Share" | Nominated |
| 2004 | MTV Pilipinas Music Award | Favorite Song | "A Love to Share" | Nominated |
| 2004 | NU Rock Awards | Artist of The Year | —N/a | Nominated |
| 2004 | NU Rock Awards | Guitarist of the Year | (for Mike Elgar & Kakoi Legaspi) | Nominated |
| 2004 | NU Rock Awards | Bassists of the Year | (for Japs Sergio) | Nominated |
| 2004 | NU Rock Awards | Drummer of the Year | (for Mark Escueta) | Nominated |
| 2005 | MTV Asia Awards | Favorite Artist: Philippines | —N/a | Won |
| 2005 | NU Rock Awards | Music Video of the Year | "You’ll Be Safe Here" | Nominated |
| 2005 | MTV Pilipinas Music Award | Best Director | Pedring Lopez for "You’ll Be Safe Here" | Nominated |
| 2005 | MTV Pilipinas Music Award | Video of the Year | "You’ll Be Safe Here" | Nominated |
| 2005 | MTV Pilipinas Music Award | Favorite Group Video | "You’ll Be Safe Here" | Won |
| 2005 | MTV Pilipinas Music Award | Favorite Song | "Balisong" | Won |
| 2005 | 18th Aliw Awards | Best Major Concert (Group) | —N/a | Nominated |
| 2005 | 18th Aliw Awards | Best Major Concert (Collaboration) | "Kitchie Nadal & Rivermaya" | Nominated |
| 2006 | MTV Asia Awards | Favorite Artist: Philippines | —N/a | Won |
| 2006 | MTV Pilipinas Music Awards | Favorite Group in a Video | "Sunday Driving" | Won |
| 2006 | MTV Pilipinas Music Awards | Best Animated Video | "Sunday Driving" | Nominated |
| 2006 | MYX Music Awards | Favorite Music Video | "You'll Be Safe Here" | Won |
| 2006 | MYX Music Awards | Favorite Media Soundtrack | "You'll Be Safe Here" for (Spirits) | Won |
| 2006 | 19th Awit Awards | Music Video Of The Year | "You'll Be Safe Here" | Won |
| 2006 | 19th Awit Awards | Best Song Written for Movie/TV/Stage Play | "You'll Be Safe Here" | Won |
| 2007 | MYX Music Awards | Favorite Media Soundtrack | "Isang Bandila" for Bandila | Nominated |
| 2007 | 55th FAMAS Award | Best Theme Song | "Umaaraw, Umuulan" | Nominated |
| 2007 | NU Rock Awards | Drummer of the Year | (for Mark Escueta) | Won |
| 2007 | NU Rock Awards | Guitarist of the Year | (for Mike Elgar) | Nominated |
| 2007 | NU Rock Awards | Bassist of the Year | (for Japs Sergio) | Nominated |
| 2007 | NU Rock Awards | Best Album Packaging | Paolo Lim for Isang Ugat, Isang Dugo | Nominated |
| 2007 | 20th Awit Awards | Song of the Year | "Isang Bandila" | Nominated |
| 2007 | 20th Awit Awards | Best Rock Song | "Inosente Lang Ang Nagtataka" | Nominated |
| 2008 | MYX Music Awards | Favorite Collaboration | with Raimund Marasigan for "Inosente Lang Ang Nagtataka" | Nominated |
| 2008 | NU Rock Awards | Best Music Video | "Maskara" | Nominated |
| 2009 | 1st PMPC Star Awards For Music | Album of the Year | "Buhay" | Nominated |
| 2009 | 1st PMPC Star Awards For Music | Alternative Album of the year | "Buhay" | Nominated |
| 2009 | 1st PMPC Star Awards For Music | Duo/Group Artist of the Year | —N/a | Nominated |
| 2010 | 2nd PMPC Star Awards for Music | Rock Artist of the Year | (for "Closest Thing to Heaven" album) | Nominated |
| 2010 | 23rd Awit Awards | Music Uplate Live Texters' Choice Poll Best Performance by a Group Recording Artists | "Dangal" | Won |
| 2010 | 23rd Awit Awards | Best Performance by a Group Recording Artists | "Dangal" | Nominated |
| 2013 | 5th PMPC Star Awards For Music | Album of the Year | "Panatang Makabanda" | Nominated |
| 2013 | 5th PMPC Star Awards For Music | Rock Album of the Year | "Panatang Makabanda" | Nominated |
| 2013 | 5th PMPC Star Awards For Music | Duo/Group Artists of the Year | (for "Panatang Makabanda" album) | Nominated |
| 2013 | 5th PMPC Star Awards For Music | Rock Artists of the Year | (for "Panatang Makabanda" album) | Nominated |
| 2014 | 27th Awit Awards | Best Rock/Alternative Recording | "Pilipinas, Kailan Ka Magigising?" | Nominated |
| 2016 | 8th PMPC Star Awards for Music | Music Video Of The Year | "Tayo" | Nominated |
| 2018 | MOR 101.9 Pinoy Music Awards 2018 | Album of the Year | "Sa Kabila ng Lahat" | Nominated |
| 2018 | PMPC Star Awards for Music 2018 | Album Of The Year | "Sa Kabila ng Lahat" | Nominated |
| 2018 | PMPC Star Awards for Music 2018 | Rock Album of the Year | "Sa Kabila ng Lahat" | Won |
| 2018 | PMPC Star Awards for Music 2018 | Rock Artists Of The Year | —N/a | Won |
| 2018 | 31st Awit Awards | Best Rock/Alternative Recording | "Manila" | Won |
| 2018 | 31st Awit Awards | Music Video of the Year | "Manila" | Nominated |
| 2019 | Myx Music Awards 2019 | Myx Magna Award | —N/a | Won |

Awards
| Preceded by "Grip Stand Throw" by Sandwich & "Serve in Silence" by Wolfgang | NU Rock Awards; Album of the Year "Free (Rivermaya album)" 2000 | Succeeded by "4-Track Mind"; Sandwich |
