= Nathan Azarcon =

Filipino musician

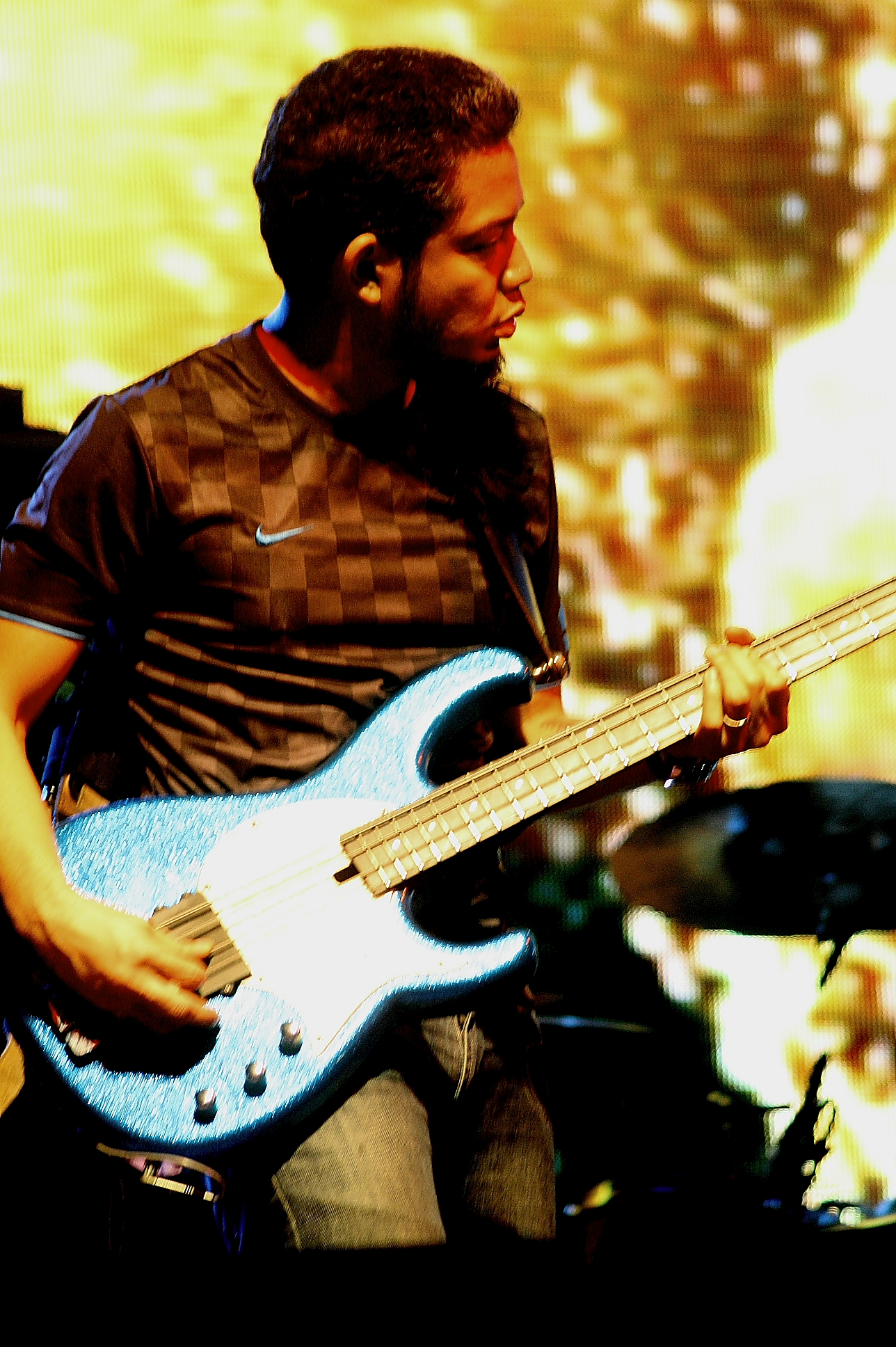

Background information
- Born: Nathan Peter Hachero Azarcon; 29 January 1975 (age 51); Philippines
- Origin: BF Homes Parañaque
- Genres: Alternative rock; pop rock; Pinoy rock
- Occupations: Music producer; musician; songwriter; arranger
- Instruments: Bass guitar; guitar; vocals
- Years active: 1992–present
- Labels: EMI Music Philippines, Inc.
- Formerly of: Rivermaya; Bamboo; Kapatid; Pinikpikan; Hijo

Nathan Peter Hachero Azarcon (born January 29, 1975) is a Filipino musician, songwriter, and producer. He is currently the bassist, vocalist and one of the founding members of Filipino rock band Rivermaya. He was also a member of the rock bands Pinikpikan, Kapatid and a founding member of Bamboo and Hijo (where he was the lead vocalist).

His complete body of work includes hits produced while he was a member of four different bands. In recognition of his work, he has been honored by NU Rock Awards; Katha Music Awards; MTV Pilipinas Music Awards; and the Awit Awards, which are presented and organized by the Philippine Association of the Record Industry (PARI).

== Background ==
A fierce advocate of South East Asian culture, Azarcon, who was a prominent fixture on magazine covers during the '90s and 2000s is partially credited (along with Karl Roy, MMA fighter Brandon Vera) for the popular resurgence of the Austro-Polynesian/Indo-Malay script Baybayin in modern Filipino culture.

=== Early career ===
Azarcon first started playing bass during the early '90s with punk funk rock band, Bazurak. They covered songs from Sex Pistols, Red Hot Chili Peppers, and the Ramones. The members included Junji Lerma, guitar player for Radioactive Sago Project; Richard Recto on vocals; Paolo Lerma on drums; J-John Valencia on guitars; and Mark Escueta on drums.

In 1998, Azarcon started his apprenticeship under Sammy Asuncion, guitar player of Pinoy funk-reggae-rock band Spy and ethnic rock group Pinikpikan, a group renowned for reinventing musical pieces using indigenous tribal instruments. Azarcon eventually joined Pinikpikan. Notable members include Grace Nono, Rene "Chong" Tengasantos and Bob Aves. Azarcon under the moniker "Elqpal", fit well with the band's ethno-tribal rhythms.

In 2000, the band released their album Atas on the Tropical Records label, a subsidiary of A&M Records. The recording won the Philippine's 2001 Katha Music Award for Album of the Year, Best World Song, and Best Performance for "Kalipay". Other standout tracks on the album include "Aumoon", "Salidumay", and "Singkilan".

In February 2001, Azarcon departed from Rivermaya after a 7-year stint with the band since its inception in 1994. He eventually went back to the band 15 years later.

The band Kapatid (lit. English: sibling) came together through an informal gathering of friends with diverse musical talents in other bands. The original lineup included Karl Roy of Advent Call and P.O.T.; Marinito "J-hoon" Balbuena of Kjwan; Ira Cruz previously of Passage; Azarcon; and Chico Molina.

In 2002, the band went on to release their debut album Edsa 524. The album contains the singles "Pagbabalik ng Kwago", "I Like It Like This", and "Visions". The band split apart rather quickly, with a couple of members leaving for other bands under less than amicable circumstances. Roy later stated of the breakup, "There was lots of talk about brotherhood and respect and the joy of playing music together. Unfortunately, things didn't turn that way". First, guitarist Ira Cruz left, and then Azarcon followed, and the two eventually hooked up with former Rivermaya bandmate Francisco "Bamboo" Mañalac."

In 2003, after living in Los Angeles following the Rivermaya tour in America, Mañalac returned to the Philippines. Azarcon introduced Mañalac to Cruz and Vic Mercado (drums) and together, they formed the band Bamboo.

Sometime in 2010, Nathan's brother Nick left his band Sinosikat? while Nathan's bandmate Ira Cruz became the new guitarist for Sinosikat?.

In January 2011, news had been circulating that Bamboo had allegedly disbanded. DJ KC Montero of Wave 89.1 confirmed the breakup on Wave's The KC Show and via Twitter. Montero clarified that all the members of the band "have decided to move on," and that he did not know why they called it quits. The group did not initially release an official statement on the issue, according to ABS-CBNNews.com.

Bamboo's lead vocalist Bamboo Mañalac finally confirmed the breakup of his band in an official statement posted before midnight of 11 January on the group's website.

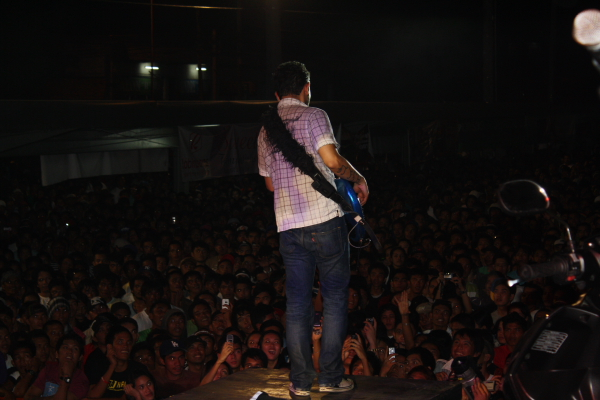
Azarcon in May 2010

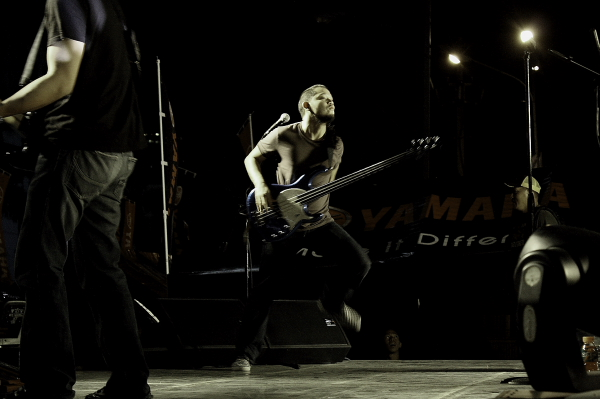
Azarcon in one of Bamboo's live performances

=== Hijo (2011–2013) ===
Three months after the breakup of Bamboo, Azarcon, Cruz and Mercado reunited to form the band "Hijo" [pronounced as ee'-ho] (a Spanish word that pertains to a male human offspring or a son). The new band was composed of Nathan Azarcon on vocals and bass, Ira Cruz on guitar, and Vic Mercado on drums. The band also includes Junji Lerma on guitar and Jay-O Orduña on keyboard synthesizer and backing vocals. They performed their first gig at Route 196 on 16 April 2011. In 2012, Orduña was replaced by Wowee Posadas on keyboards and backing vocals and Mercado was replaced by Paolo Manuel on drums. Posadas later left the group on the same year. Two years after Hijo was formed, other band members left the band and left Azarcon as the sole member. Azarcon posted on his Facebook account that new members will be introduced in 2015.

Azarcon posted teasers on Facebook of his new band called "Disband" which features Bea Lao of General Luna as the drummer. Azarcon then later posted that instead of renaming the band, it will still bear the name Hijo but would be called Hijo 2.0.

The band's music influence and genre is described by critics as "alternative metal" however the band rather label themselves as "Kung-Fu rock".

=== Return to Rivermaya (2016–present) ===
On January 9, 2016, Azarcon re-united with his former Rivermaya co-members, Perf de Castro, Mark Escueta and Rico Blanco for a "surprise mini semi-reunion", following de Castro's gig at 19 East, Taguig. Months later, Azarcon returned full-time to the band replacing Norby David for the first time since his departure in 2001.

== Personal life ==
Azarcon is a member of the Tau Gamma Phi fraternity. He is married and has two kids.

== Equipment ==
Azarcon has been known to use Fender, Music Man and Modulus bass guitars. He now uses Warwick basses exclusively.

== Discography ==
Rivermaya

- Rivermaya (1994)
- Trip (1996)
- Atomic Bomb (1997)
- It's Not Easy Being Green (1999)
- Free (2000)
- Sa Kabila ng Lahat (2017)

Bamboo

- As the Music Plays (2004)
- Light Peace Love (2005)
- We Stand Alone Together (2007)
- Tomorrow Becomes Yesterday (2008)
