= Mark Escueta =

Filipino musician

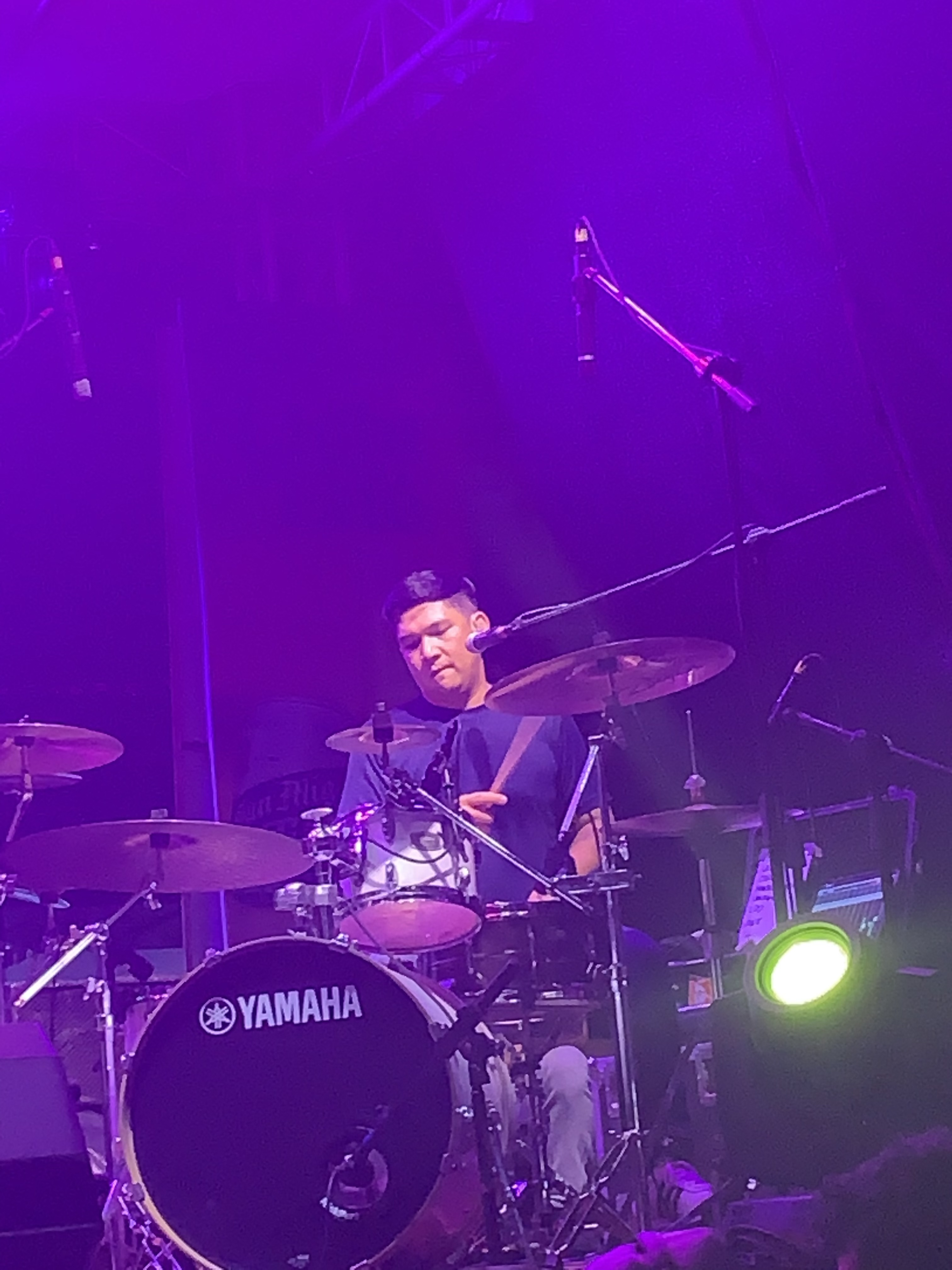
- Escueta in 2022

Background information
- Also known as: "The Heart and Soul of Rivermaya"
- Born: Mark Edward Penabella Escueta; 9 January 1976 (age 50)
- Genres: Alternative rock; Pinoy rock; pop rock
- Occupation: Musician
- Instruments: Drums; guitar; percussion; trumpet; vocals
- Years active: 1994–present
- Spouse: Jolina Magdangal (m. 2011)

Mark Edward Penabella Escueta (Tagalog pronunciation: [ʔɛsˈkwɛta]; born 9 January 1976) is a Filipino musician and one of the founding members of the Filipino rock band Rivermaya. Escueta has been the only constant member of Rivermaya since its inception in 1994.

== Early life ==
Escueta is the eldest of four siblings. He has two younger brothers and one sister. Escueta finished high school at De La Salle Santiago Zobel School and took Business Administration major in Computer Applications at the De La Salle-College of Saint Benilde. His father is lawyer Eduardo U. Escueta, a retired official of the National Police Commission (NAPOLCOM). Escueta's family originally hails from Tiaong, Quezon.

== Musical career ==
=== Rivermaya (1994–present) ===
Escueta began playing drums at the age of 13. He entered the Philippine music industry when he became the drummer of the band Bazurak where one of his bandmates, Nathan Azarcon was the bass player. Azarcon introduced Escueta to another band, Xaga, where Azarcon also played bass. In 1994, he replaced Rome Velayo as drummer and percussionist of Xaga which eventually disbanded and was renamed Rivermaya. He served as drummer of Rivermaya until 2011 when Ryan Peralta replaced him as the drummer. He gradually switched to guitars and became the lead vocalist of the band (along with Mike Elgar and later Nathan Azarcon). Peralta left in May 2018 and Escueta resumed his role as the band’s drummer.

On his birthday at 9 January 2016, he re-united with his former Rivermaya co-members, Perf de Castro, Nathan Azarcon and Rico Blanco for a "surprise mini semi-reunion", following de Castro's gig at 19 East, Muntinlupa.

=== Other musical interests ===
Escueta is also the former drummer of the short-lived band, Planet Garapata formed by Eraserheads drummer, Raimund Marasigan in 1996.

== Personal life ==
Escueta married singer-actress Jolina Magdangal on 21 November 2011. The two have kids named Pele and Vika.

== Discography ==
Rivermaya

- Rivermaya (1994)
- Trip (1996)
- Atomic Bomb (1997)
- It's Not Easy Being Green (1999)
- Free (2000)
- Tuloy ang Ligaya (2001)
- Between the Stars and Waves (2003)
- You'll Be Safe Here (EP) (2005)
- Isang Ugat, Isang Dugo (2006)
- Bagong Liwanag (EP) (2007)
- Buhay (2008)
- Closest Thing to Heaven (2009)
- Panatang Makabanda (2013)
- Sa Kabila ng Lahat (2017)
