= Kakoy Legaspi =

Filipino musician

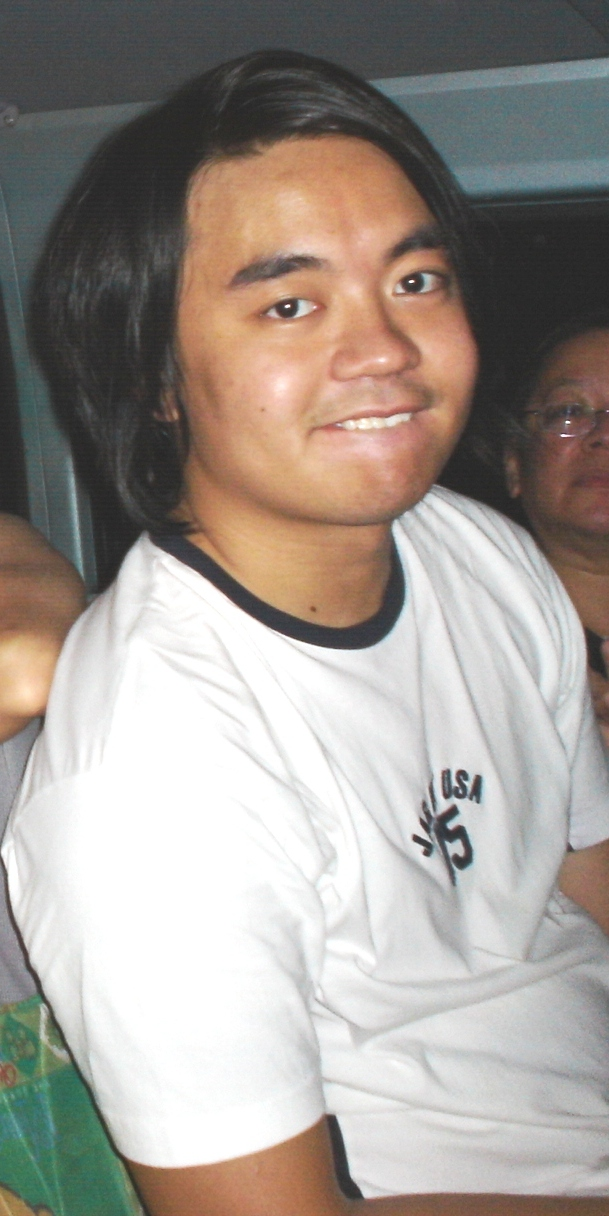
- Legaspi in 2005
- Born: Victor Legaspi; May 7, 1981 (age 44); Philippines
- Occupation: Musician (guitarist)
- Years active: 2001–present
- Known for: Rivermaya
- Notable work: Rivermaya, Barbie's Cradle, Mr. Crayon, Peryodiko, Bamboo Mañalac, Julianne Tarroja, Bullet Dumas, Dong Abay

Victor "Kakoy" Legaspi (sometimes misspelled Kakoi) is a Filipino musician, best known for being a part of the second evolution of the Rivermaya lineup wherein he served as guitarist from 2001 until 2004 and co-writing the band's hit song "Balisong". He was with Rivermaya in two studio albums, one extended play, and one live album.

Legaspi also played for Barbie's Cradle and Peryodiko, and plays as a session guitarist for Bamboo Mañalac and Dong Abay.

== See also ==
- Rivermaya
- Barbie's Cradle
- Bullet Dumas
