= The Voice of the Philippines discography =

- Studio albums: 6
- Singles: 8

The Voice of the Philippines is a singing reality competition on ABS-CBN. Since its inception, its contestants (dubbed as "artists" in the show) have released various albums under MCA Music and Star Records, ABS-CBN's record label arm.

== Singles ==
=== During The Voice of the Philippines ===
Artist	Season	Final standing	Song	Year	Record label	Source
Mitoy Yonting	1	Winner	"Bulag"	2013	MCA Music	
Klarisse de Guzman	1	Runner-up	"Slowly"	2013	MCA Music	
Janice Javier	1	Third place	"Coming Home"	2013	MCA Music	
Myk Perez	1	Fourth place	"Fix You"	2013	MCA Music	
Thor	1	Finalist	"Antay"	2013	MCA Music	
Paolo Onesa	1	Finalist	"Lucky In Love"	2013	MCA Music	
Radha	1	Finalist	"Huwag Kang Mainis"	2013	MCA Music	
Morissette	1	Finalist	"Begin"	2013	MCA Music	

=== After The Voice of the Philippines ===
Artist	Season	Final standing	Song	Year	Record label	Source
Klarisse de Guzman	1	Runner-up	"Di Kayang Pilitin"	2014	MCA Music	
Jessica Reynoso	1	Finalist	"Just Like You"	2014	BMBX Entertainment	

== Albums ==
=== By artist ===
Artist	Season	Final standing	Album	Release date	Record label	Source
Mitoy Yonting	1	Winner	The Voice of the Philippines – The Complete Season 1 Collection	October 18, 2013	MCA Music	
Myk Perez	1	Fourth place	Myk Perez: My Acoustic	February 3, 2014	MCA Music	
Paolo Onesa	1	Finalist	Paolo Onesa: Pop Goes Standards	February 17, 2014	MCA Music	
Janice Javier	1	Third place	Janice Javier	April 22, 2014	MCA Music	
Klarisse de Guzman	1	Runner-up	Klarisse de Guzman	June 2, 2014	MCA Music	
Darryl Shy	1	Finalist	Darryl Shy	July 18, 2014	Star Records	
Mitoy Yonting	1	Winner	Hanggang Wakas	August 1, 2014	MCA Music	
Moira dela Torre	1	Eliminated at the Battles	Moira dela Torre	October 2014	Ivory Music	
Thor	1	Finalist	Master Of Soul	February 17, 2015	Cornerstone Music, Star Records	
Morissette	1	Finalist	Morissette	March 20, 2015	Star Records	

=== Season albums ===
Artist	Season	Final standing	Album	Release date	Record label	Source
Top 16 artists	1	Top 16	The Voice of the Philippines: The Final 16	September 20, 2013	MCA Music	
Final 4 artists	1	Final 4	The Voice of the Philippines the Final 4	October 11, 2013	MCA Music	
