= The Voice of the Philippines season 1 =

The Voice of the Philippines
- Season 1
- Hosted by: Toni Gonzaga
- Coaches: apl.de.ap; Lea Salonga; Sarah Geronimo; Bamboo Mañalac
- Winner: Mitoy Yonting
- Winning coach: Lea Salonga
- Runner-up: Klarisse de Guzman
- Finals venue: Newport Performing Arts Theater, Resorts World Manila, Newport City, Pasay

Release
- Original network: ABS-CBN; The Filipino Channel (International broadcaster)
- Original release: June 15 – September 29, 2013

Season chronology
- Next → Season 2

The first season of The Voice of the Philippines is a Philippine reality singing competition. It is part of The Voice franchise and is based from a similar competition format in the Netherlands called The Voice of Holland. The show is hosted by Toni Gonzaga with Robi Domingo, and Alex Gonzaga serving as the V-Reporters or as the social media correspondents. Bamboo Mañalac, Sarah Geronimo, Lea Salonga, and apl.de.ap serve as the four coaches and the judging panel of the show.

The show has a primer called Mic Test: The Voice of the Philippines Primer that aired on June 9, 2013. The first season premiered on June 15, 2013 on ABS-CBN. It aired every Saturdays at 9:00 p.m. (PST), and Sundays at 8:15 p.m. (PST). It was also aired internationally via The Filipino Channel, ABS-CBN's international channel.

On September 29, 2013, Mitoy Yonting of Team Lea won the competition winning the grand prize of two million pesos along with an Asian tour, a brand new car, an entertainment package, and a four-year recording contract. Klarisse de Guzman of Team Sarah was proclaimed as the runner-up.

== Development ==
ABS-CBN acquired the rights of the franchise back in 2011 after the success of its American counterpart. The Philippines was then listed as one of the countries who bought the rights for the franchise as posted in Talpa's website. The show was later confirmed by Laurenti Dyogi, a Filipino director who had notable success with reality shows like Pinoy Big Brother, Pinoy Dream Academy, and Junior MasterChef Pinoy Edition.

A teaser was shown during the commercial break of Sarah G. Live and Gandang Gabi Vice last December 30, 2012. A teaser, showing the recorded snippets of the blind auditions, was aired on May 15, 2013. Another trailer was posted in the show's official Facebook fan page on May 24, 2013, showing the coaches' bantering, rapport, and eagerness to fight over an auditionee.

A teaser revealed the premier date of the show was aired during the final performance night of the fourth season of Pilipinas Got Talent. A primer, dubbed as Mic Test: The Voice of the Philippines Primer, was also announced in the same night. It aired on June 9, 2013. The primer had a special participation of Danny O'Donoghue, The Script's frontman, who at that time sits as a coach in The Voice UK.

=== Coaches and hosts ===
The coaches of the first season of The Voice of the Philippines

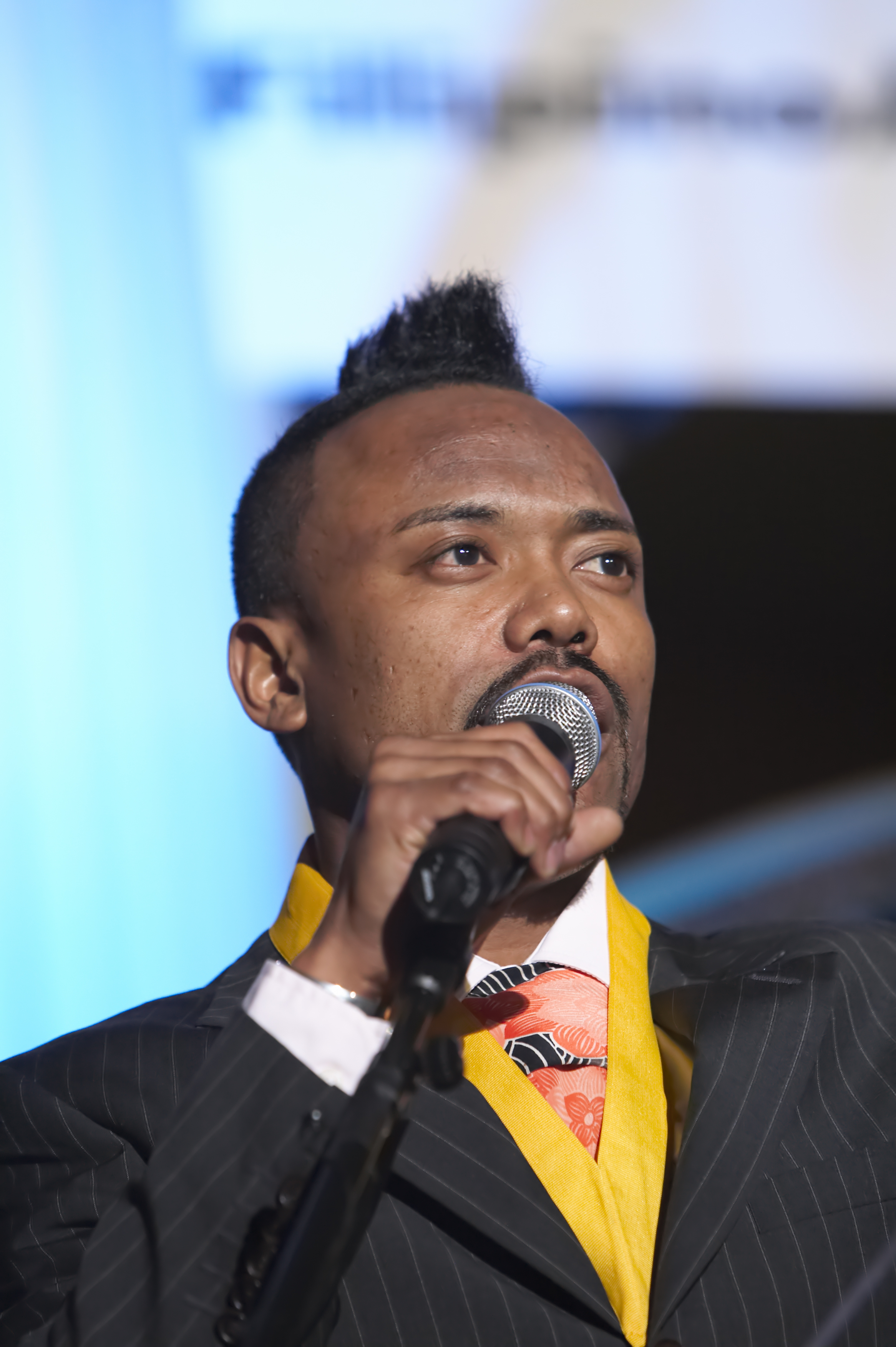
apl.de.ap

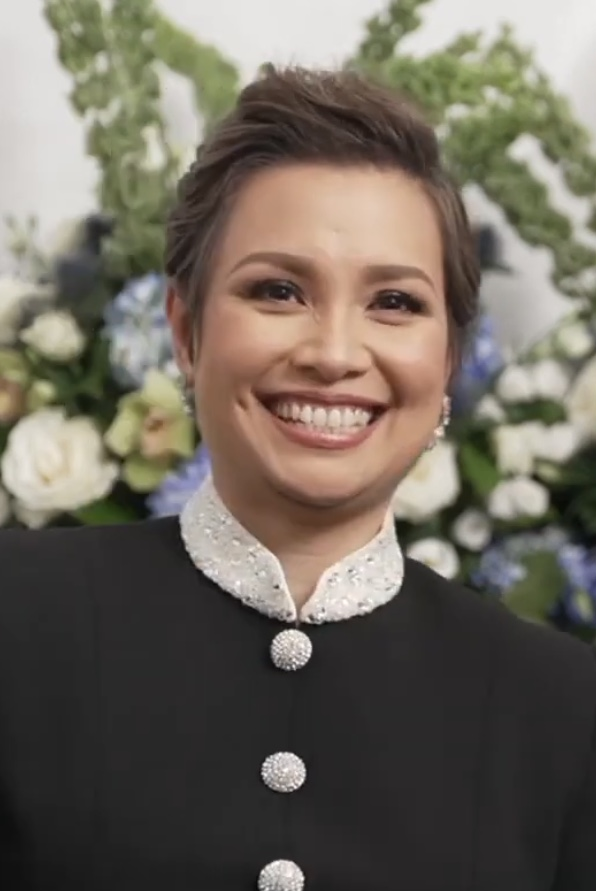
Lea Salonga

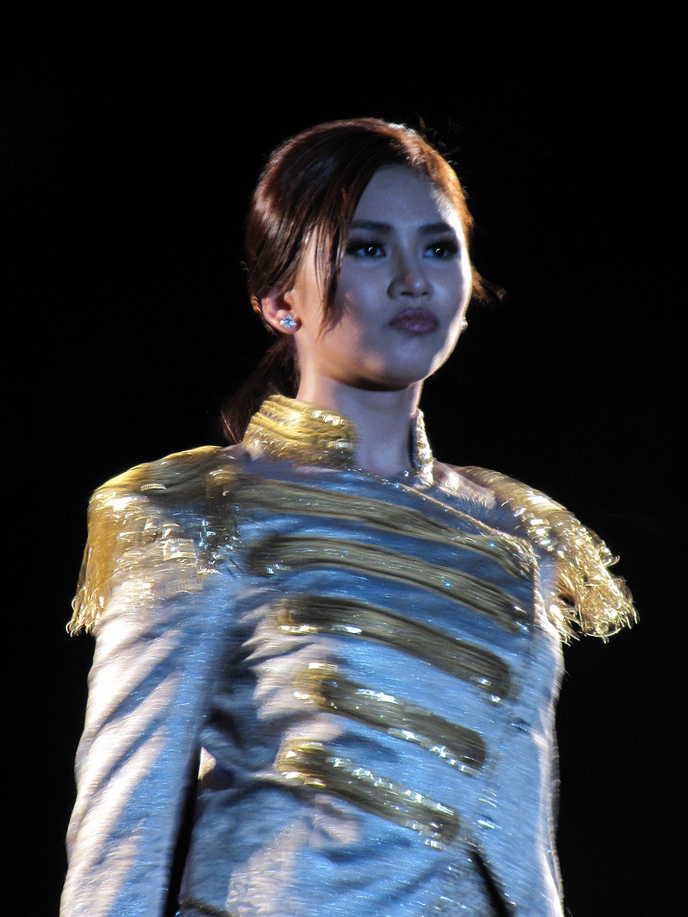
Sarah Geronimo

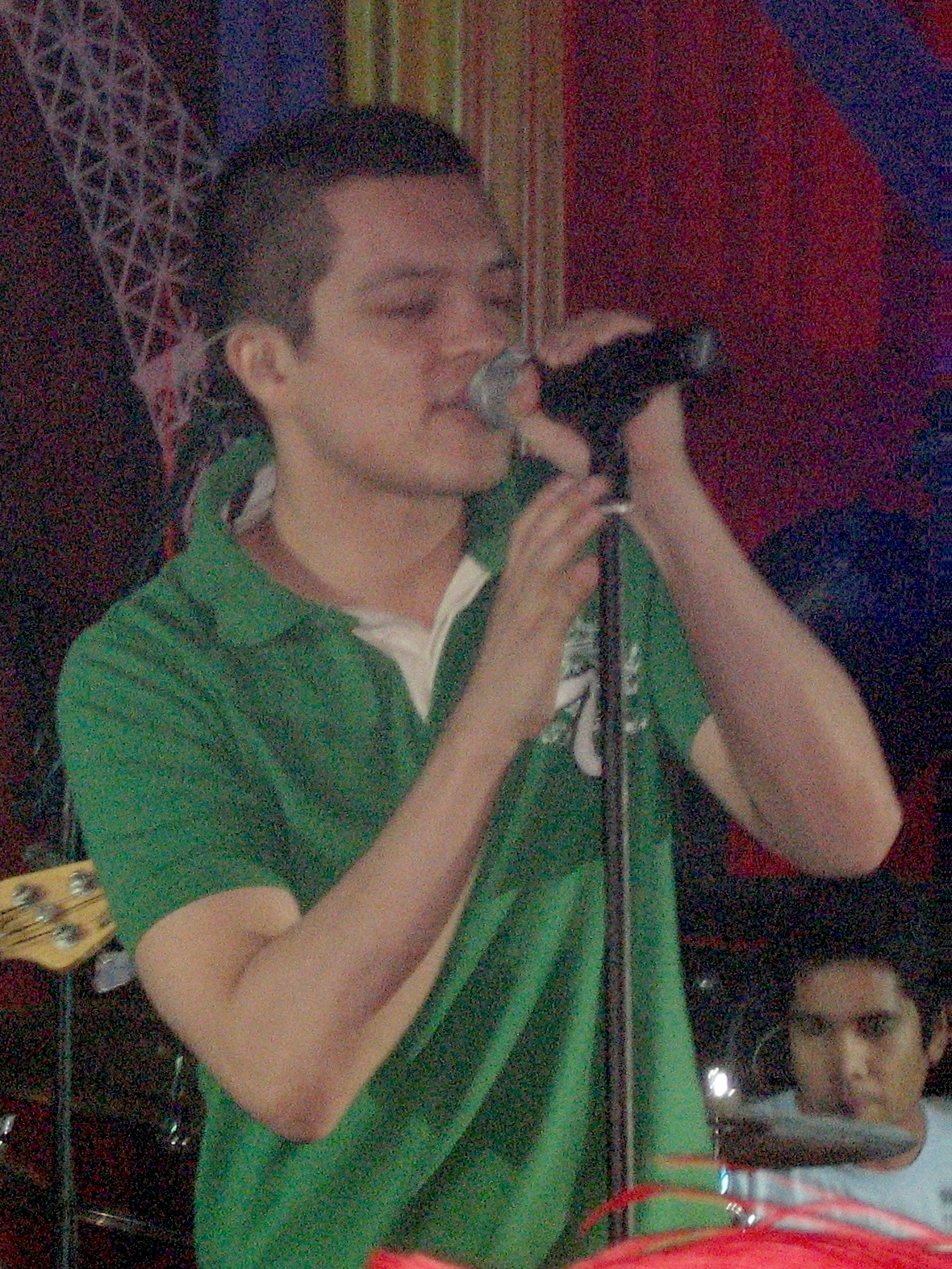
Bamboo Mañalac

Rumors had been circulating that Toni Gonzaga and Robi Domingo, and even Lea Salonga were said to host the show. Also, Zsa Zsa Padilla was rumored as one of the coaches. However, all of these rumors were debunked as the production team stated that there were still no confirmed hosts or coaches for the reality show.

After months of speculations, Toni Gonzaga was confirmed to host the franchise. It was announced on Gonzaga's talk show, The Buzz. Gonzaga later confirmed that she will be joined by Robi Domingo as the show's media correspondent. Incidentally, this marks Gonzaga and Domingo's third time to work together after Pinoy Big Brother: Unlimited and Pinoy Big Brother: Teen Edition 4 which were also under the unit of Director Lauren Dyogi.

On February 6, 2013, it was announced that Sarah Geronimo will be one of the four coaches. During the last episode of Sarah G. Live on February 10, 2013, Bamboo Mañalac revealed that he was proud that he will be collaborating with Geronimo on a new big project, which will be The Voice of the Philippines. On February 14, 2013, ABS-CBN aired a promotional plug during the airtime of Kahit Konting Pagtingin, a pre-primetime television drama, confirming Bamboo Mañalac's stint in the show as coach and judge. On the night of February 19, 2013, Lea Salonga confirmed her stint as an official coach in the show via her official Twitter account. In the same night, ABS-CBN later confirmed Salonga's role on the show. It was announced in early March 2013 that apl.de.ap of The Black Eyed Peas was being negotiated to join the said reality show. On March 7, 2013, it was announced through ABS-CBN's entertainment website, Push, that apl.de.ap will sit as the fourth coach. On an article posted in the network's official website dated March 20, 2013, apl.de.ap was slated to do the initial promotional plug with TFC London and was scheduled to arrive in Manila by April to meet and work with the three other coaches and the rest of the show's team.

On April 16, 2013, Alex Gonzaga, the younger sister of Toni Gonzaga, was revealed to join the show, teaming up with Robi Domingo as V-Reporters or as the show's social media correspondents.

=== Prizes ===
The winner of The Voice of the Philippines is set to win an entertainment package from Sony Bravia, an Asian tour for two, a brand new car from Ford Philippines, a tax-free cash prize of 2 million pesos, and a four-year recording contract from MCA Universal.

=== Auditions ===
Cities in the Philippines where the auditions were held.

Auditions started in September 2012. Open Call Auditions were held on September 15, 2012 at Island Pacific Supermarket in Panorama City, Los Angeles, California and on September 16, 2012 at California's Great America Parkway in Santa Clara, California. The auditions were only open to people with Filipino ancestry in Southern California.

Radio screenings were also held on January 7–11, 2013 at various ABS-CBN Radio stations in key cities such as Metro Manila, Naga, Legazpi City, Baguio, Tacloban, Cebu City, Davao City, General Santos, Zamboanga City, Cagayan de Oro, Bacolod, Iloilo City, and Dagupan. Radio screenings were called The Voice ng Radyo (The Voice of Radio), where daily and weekly winners will have the chance to participate in the Blind auditions.

Auditions in key cities throughout the Philippines were announced in the finale episode of Sarah G. Live, Sarah Geronimo's night variety show, on February 10, 2013. On the same night, the online auditions were also introduced which ran from February 9 to 19, 2013.

On-ground auditions of The Voice of the Philippines
Date	Venue	Location
Auditions held outside the Philippines
September 15, 2012	Island Pacific Supermarket	Panorama City, Los Angeles, California, United States
September 16, 2012	California's Great America Parkway	Santa Clara, California, United States
Auditions held in the Philippines
February 23, 2013	ABS-CBN Bacolod Broadcasting Complex	Bacolod, Negros Occidental
February 23, 2013	Sarabia Manor Hotel & Convention Center	Iloilo City, Iloilo
February 23, 2013	CCB Gym, Leyte Park Resort & Hotel	Tacloban, Leyte
February 23, 2013	Sarossa International Hotel & Residential Suites	Cebu City, Cebu
March 2, 2013	Ellis Arcade and Suites	General Santos, South Cotabato
March 2, 2013	ABS-CBN Zamboanga	Zamboanga City
March 2, 2013	N Hotel	Cagayan de Oro, Misamis Oriental
March 2, 2013	ABS-CBN Davao Broadcasting Complex	Davao City
March 9, 2013	ABS-CBN Palawan Complex	Puerto Princesa, Palawan
March 9, 2013	Plaza Del Norte Hotel and Convention Center	Laoag, Ilocos Norte
March 9, 2013	ABS-CBN Naga	Naga, Camarines Sur
March 9, 2013	Porta Vaga Mall	Baguio, Benguet
March 9, 2013	Studio 5, ABS-CBN Broadcasting Center	Quezon City

== Teams ==
Color key

- Winner
- Runner-up
- Third place
- Fourth place
- Eliminated in the Live Shows
- Eliminated in the Battles

Coaches	Top 52 artists				
apl.de.ap					
apl.de.ap	Janice Javier	Thor	Jessica Reynoso	Penelope Matanguihan	Stan Perfecto
apl.de.ap	Cora dela Cruz	Jessica Corpuz	Emmanuelle Vera	Lance Fabros	Cara Manglapus
apl.de.ap	Moira Dela Torre	Sir Lord Lumibao	Lorenzana Siblings		
Lea Salonga					
Lea Salonga	Mitoy Yonting	Radha	Kimpoy Mainit	Darryl Shy	Diday Garcellano
Lea Salonga	RJ dela Fuente	Marissa Saroca	Juvie Pelos	Rainer Acosta	MJ Podolig
Lea Salonga	Taw Muhammad	Japs Mendoza	Chien Berbana		
Sarah Geronimo					
Sarah Geronimo	Klarisse de Guzman	Morissette	Eva delos Santos	Maki Ricafort	Yuki Ito
Sarah Geronimo	Junji Arias	Gabriel Ramos	Rouxette Swinton	Hans Dimayuga	Michaellen Temporada
Sarah Geronimo	Dave Jonathan Lamar	Kathreen Castro	Lecelle Trinidad		
Bamboo Mañalac					
Bamboo Mañalac	Myk Perez	Paolo Onesa	Isabella Fabregas	Lee Grane Maranan	Angelique Alcantara
Bamboo Mañalac	Talia Reyes	John Philip Duka	Denise Sagun	Angelica Prado	Cordovales Father & Son
Bamboo Mañalac	Deborah Victa	Nicole Parada	Dan Billano		

== Blind auditions ==
The Voice of the Philippines' coaches (from left to right): Bamboo Mañalac, Sarah Geronimo, Lea Salonga, and apl.de.ap sitting on their respective red chairs while waiting for the artist to perform during the Blind auditions.

The Blind auditions, which was the main highlight of the show, were filmed last April 2013. Geronimo, on an interview made by The Buzz last April 14, 2013, elaborated that the first day of taping for the blind auditions started on April 15, 2013 and ended on April 18, 2013 in Studio 2 – ABS-CBN Broadcasting Center, Quezon City, Metro Manila. In an article published by Philippine Daily Inquirer and written by Lea Salonga, she wrote that a total of one hundred twenty one artists performed during the Blind auditions.

During the guest appearance of the four coaches on July 11, 2013 in ABS-CBN's noontime variety show, It's Showtime, Salonga teased for a 'big twist' that will affect the mechanics of forming their final teams who will be going into the Battles. Initially, it was reported that, from one hundred twenty one artists, only forty eight artists will advance to the Battles. However, in the said twist revealed last July 21, 2013, an additional artist was added per team. Thus increasing the total number of artists advancing to the Battles to fifty two.

The Blind auditions, composed of thirteen episodes, were aired from June 15, 2013 until July 27, 2013.

Color key

✔	Coach hit his/her "I WANT YOU" button
	Artist defaulted to this coach's team
	Artist elected to join this coach's team
	Artist eliminated with no coach pressing his or her "I WANT YOU" button

=== Episode 1 (June 15) ===
The first episode was graced by an opening performance of the coaches and sang their own rendition of "Hall of Fame" by The Script.

Order	Artist	Age	Hometown	Song	Coach's and artist's choices			
Order	Artist	Age	Hometown	Song	apl.de.ap	Lea	Sarah	Bamboo
1	Darryl Shy	44	Baguio	"Tatsulok"	✔	✔	—	—
2	Deborah Victa	21	Laguna	"American Boy"	—	—	—	✔
3	Romel Colao	32	Bukidnon	"Natutulog Ba Ang Diyos"	—	—	—	—
4	Andy Go	16	Cagayan de Oro	"Ngayon at Kailanman"	—	—	—	—
5	Kevin Ibañez	N/A	N/A	"Let Me Be the One"	—	—	—	—
6	Chien Berbana	31	Ipil, Zamboanga Sibugay	"Sayang Na Sayang"	✔	✔	—	—
7	Thor	32	Davao del Norte	"I Have Nothing"	✔	✔	✔	✔

=== Episode 2 (June 16) ===
Order	Artist	Age	Hometown	Song	Coach's and artist's choices			
Order	Artist	Age	Hometown	Song	apl.de.ap	Lea	Sarah	Bamboo
1	Cora dela Cruz	27	Cavite	"Usok"	✔	✔	—	—
2	Edward Benosa	23	Quezon City	"It Will Rain"	—	—	—	—
3	Taw Muhammad	24	Iloilo	"Ironic"	—	✔	✔	—
4	Junji Arias	36	Makati	"I'll Be There for You"	—	✔	✔	✔
5	Miriam Manalo	24	Pampanga	"A Natural Woman"	—	—	—	—
6	Alden Asehan, Jr.	N/A	Cebu	"The Last Time"	—	—	—	—
7	Ian Masaga	N/A	N/A	"Yakap Sa Dilim"	—	—	—	—
8	Abby Asistio	29	Antipolo	"Girl on Fire"	—	—	—	—

=== Episode 3 (June 22) ===
Order	Artist	Age	Hometown	Song	Coach's and artist's choices			
Order	Artist	Age	Hometown	Song	apl.de.ap	Lea	Sarah	Bamboo
1	Monique delos Santos	24	Cebu	"Oh! Darling"	—	—	—	—
2	Eva delos Santos	51	Cebu	"Proud Mary"	✔	—	✔	—
3	Lorenzana Siblings (Grace and Guji Lorenzana)	25 & 33	Taguig	"Need You Now"	✔	✔	—	—
4	Sir Lord Lumibao	23	Zamboanga City	"I'll Be"	✔	—	—	—
5	Jasmine Abrenica	N/A	N/A	"Firework"	—	—	—	—
6	Raymund Portosa	N/A	N/A	"Use Somebody"	—	—	—	—
7	Lee Grane Maranan	29	Makati	"Anak"	—	—	✔	✔

=== Episode 4 (June 23) ===
Order	Artist	Age	Hometown	Song	Coach's and artist's choices			
Order	Artist	Age	Hometown	Song	apl.de.ap	Lea	Sarah	Bamboo
1	Morissette	16	Quezon City	"Love on Top"	—	—	✔	—
2	Radha	36	Parañaque	"What's Love Got to Do with It"	—	✔	✔	—
3	Abigail Garza	N/A	N/A	"21 Guns"	—	—	—	—
4	Marielle Mamaclay	27	Nueva Ecija	"Rolling in the Deep"	—	—	—	—
5	Isabella Fabregas	24	Quezon City	"Lean on Me"	—	—	✔	✔
6	Jaron Liclican	22	California, USA	"Feeling Good"	—	—	—	—
7	Michaellen Temporada	24	Zamboanga del Sur	"Summertime"	✔	✔	✔	✔

=== Episode 5 (June 29) ===
Order	Artist	Age	Hometown	Song	Coach's and artist's choices			
Order	Artist	Age	Hometown	Song	apl.de.ap	Lea	Sarah	Bamboo
1	Nicole Floirendo	20	Cagayan de Oro	"Titanium"	—	—	—	—
2	Angelique Alcantara	17	Samal, Davao del Norte	"Diamonds"	—	—	—	✔
3	Moira Dela Torre	19	Makati	"Hallelujah"	✔	—	—	—
4	Mac Escolano	21	Novaliches, Quezon City	"Maging Sino Ka Man"	—	—	—	—
5	Gabriel Ramos	21	Laguna	"Tulak ng Bibig, Kabig ng Dibdib"	—	—	✔	—
6	Michael Salzsieder	28	Batangas	"Yugyugan Na"	—	—	—	—
7	Mitoy Yonting	43	Pangasinan	"Bakit Ako Mahihiya"	—	✔	—	✔

=== Episode 6 (June 30) ===
Order	Artist	Age	Hometown	Song	Coach's and artist's choices			
Order	Artist	Age	Hometown	Song	apl.de.ap	Lea	Sarah	Bamboo
1	Cara Manglapus	25	Muntinlupa	"At Last"	✔	—	—	—
2	Cordovales Father & Son (Willy and Mark Cordovales)	42/19	Antipolo	"Pagsubok"	—	✔	—	✔
3	Hans Dimayuga	24	Parañaque	"Stand by Me"	—	—	✔	—
4	Andrea Koreen Medina	18	Santa Rosa City, Laguna	"River Deep, Mountain High"	—	—	—	—
5	Joanne Bernal	17	N/A	"Mas que Nada"	—	—	—	—
6	Jacob Benedicto	21	Parañaque	"The Way You Look Tonight"	—	—	—	—
7	Myk Perez	22	Palawan	"I'm Yours"	✔	✔	✔	✔
8	Robert Cozma	36	Angeles, Pampanga	"Habang May Buhay"	—	—	—	—

=== Episode 7 (July 6) ===
Order	Artist	Age	Hometown	Song	Coach's and artist's choices			
Order	Artist	Age	Hometown	Song	apl.de.ap	Lea	Sarah	Bamboo
1	Ramoncito Alfonso	29	Quezon City	"Di Na Natuto"	—	—	—	—
2	Angelica Prado	24	Bacolod	"Dreams"	—	✔	—	✔
3	Paolo Onesa	19	Zamboanga City	"Yakap Sa Dilim"	—	—	—	✔
4	Diday Garcellano	21	Quezon City	"Mercy"	—	✔	—	—
5	Janel Favila	21	Cainta, Rizal	"Oo"	—	—	—	—
6	Katrina Madrigal	N/A	N/A	"Bukas Na Lang Kita Mamahalin"	—	—	—	—
7	Argel Laur	N/A	N/A	"Mahal Pa Rin Kita"	—	—	—	—
8	Juvie Pelos	21	Surigao	"Uwahig"	✔	✔	✔	✔

=== Episode 8 (July 7) ===
Order	Artist	Age	Hometown	Song	Coach's and artist's choices			
Order	Artist	Age	Hometown	Song	apl.de.ap	Lea	Sarah	Bamboo
1	Ayana Grico	21	General Santos	"Sweet Child o' Mine"	—	—	—	—
2	Kathreen Castro	20	Davao	"Rolling in the Deep"	—	✔	✔	✔
3	Lance Fabros	28	Valenzuela	"Chasing Cars"	✔	—	—	—
4	Stan Perfecto	19	Manila	"It Will Rain"	✔	—	—	—
5	Jumed Nicolas	N/A	N/A	"Forget You"	—	—	—	—
6	Lana Mariano	N/A	N/A	"Iisa Pa Lamang"	—	—	—	—
7	Nicole Parada	23	Batangas City	"Inseparable"	—	—	—	✔
8	Wilson Peñaflor	26	Pangasinan	"How Am I Supposed to Live Without You"	—	—	—	—
9	Yuki Ito	22	Bulacan	"It's a Man's Man's Man's World"	—	✔	✔	—

=== Episode 9 (July 13) ===
Order	Artist	Age	Hometown	Song	Coach's and artist's choices			
Order	Artist	Age	Hometown	Song	apl.de.ap	Lea	Sarah	Bamboo
1	Sherin Hidayat	18	Antique	"Bakit Labis Kitang Mahal"	—	—	—	—
2	Marissa Saroca	28	Australia	"Crazy in Love"	—	✔	—	—
3	Marian Kilroy	N/A	N/A	"Valerie"	—	—	—	—
4	Tori Ingram	N/A	N/A	"Where Have You Been"	—	—	—	—
5	John Philip Duka	28	Davao	"Secrets"	✔	—	—	✔
6	MJ Podolig	32	Sorsogon	"Handog"	—	✔	—	—
7	Genesis Butil	25	Bukidnon	"Grabe"	—	—	—	—
8	Jennifer Bautista	N/A	N/A	"If I Ain't Got You"	—	—	—	—
9	Its Saludo	N/A	N/A	"Vision of Love"	—	—	—	—
10	Janice Javier	38	Pasay	"A Natural Woman"	✔	✔	✔	✔

=== Episode 10 (July 14) ===
Order	Artist	Age	Hometown	Song	Coach's and artist's choices			
Order	Artist	Age	Hometown	Song	apl.de.ap	Lea	Sarah	Bamboo
1	Rainer Acosta	29	Bulakan, Bulacan	"Muli"	—	✔	—	—
2	Talia Reyes	20	Quezon City	"Sunday Morning"	—	—	—	✔
3	Angeline Paylado	N/A	N/A	"Come Together"	—	—	—	—
4	Abigail Alamo	N/A	N/A	"Tulak ng Bibig, Kabig ng Dibdib"	—	—	—	—
5	Lecelle Trinidad	17	Gapan, Nueva Ecija	"Bust Your Windows"	—	✔	✔	—
6	Jordan Castillo, Jr.	20	Fairview, Quezon City	"Ordinary People"	—	—	—	—
7	Penelope Ann Matanguihan	21	Batangas	"Love on Top"	✔	✔	✔	—
8	Japs Mendoza	16	Malolos, Bulacan	"Truth"	—	✔	—	—

=== Episode 11 (July 20) ===
Order	Artist	Age	Hometown	Song	Coach's and artist's choices			
Order	Artist	Age	Hometown	Song	apl.de.ap	Lea	Sarah	Bamboo
1	Nicole Angela Judalena	22	Quezon City	"Sunday Morning"	—	—	—	—
2	Maki Ricafort	34	Tondo, Manila	"Foolish Heart"	—	—	✔	—
3	Charlene and Charmaine Albino	18-18	Quezon City	"Salamat"	—	—	—	—
4	Jessica Corpuz	18	Tarlac City	"Sana'y Wala ng Wakas"	✔	—	—	✔
5	Keane Andeza	27	Antipolo	"I Started a Joke"	—	—	—	—
6	Klarisse de Guzman	21	Makati	"Tulak ng Bibig, Kabig ng Dibdib"	✔	✔	✔	✔
7	RJ dela Fuente	27	Parañaque	"Get Here"	—	✔	—	—

=== Episode 12 (July 21) ===
Order	Artist	Age	Hometown	Song	Coach's and artist's choices			
Order	Artist	Age	Hometown	Song	apl.de.ap	Lea	Sarah	Bamboo
1	Chivas Malunda	N/A	N/A	"Honestly"	—	—	—	—
2	Aia De Leon	35	Parañaque	"The Way You Make Me Feel"	—	—	—	—
3	Micah Nepomuceno	16	N/A	"The Way You Look Tonight"	—	—	—	—
4	Regine Saga	17	Parañaque	"Human Nature"	—	—	—	—
5	Denise Sagun	34	Subic	"You Were Meant For Me"	—	—	—	✔
6	Jessica Reynoso	16	San Pedro, Laguna	"Fallin'"	✔	✔	✔	—
7	Kimpoy Mainit	16	Bohol	"Nobody's Perfect"	—	✔	—	—
8	Mavie Lozano	19	Quezon City	"Drive"	—	Team full	—	—
9	Florie Mae Cruz	N/A	Zamboanga City	"We Found Love"	—	Team full	—	—
10	Dan Billano	30	Marikina	"This Love"	—	Team full	—	✔

=== Episode 13 (July 27) ===
Order	Artist	Age	Hometown	Song	Coach's and artist's choices			
Order	Artist	Age	Hometown	Song	apl.de.ap	Lea	Sarah	Bamboo
1	Rouxette Swinton	16	Malolos, Bulacan	"Safe & Sound"	—	Team full	✔	Team full
2	Emmanuelle Vera	18	Manila	"Somewhere Over The Rainbow"	✔	Team full	—	Team full
3	Mico Cruz	N/A	N/A	"Please Don't Stop The Music"	Team full	Team full	—	Team full
4	Kate Torres	N/A	N/A	"Love Story"	Team full	Team full	—	Team full
5	Bryan Aquino	N/A	N/A	"Someone Like You"	Team full	Team full	—	Team full
6	Dave Jonathan Lamar	22	Quezon	"The Man Who Can't Be Moved"	Team full	Team full	✔	Team full

== The Battles ==
The Battles stage. Toni Gonzaga is in the center of the stage, while the coaches are in the front of it who are accompanied by their "guest advisers."

The Battles were filmed on July 8 and 9, 2013 at the Studio 10 of ABS-CBN Broadcasting Center in Quezon City. From the one hundred twenty one invited artists during the Blind auditions, only fifty two artists will proceed to the Battles. Each coach will pick two to three artists and pit them together into a battle of vocals. The winner of the battle will only be determined by his or her coach. The other coaches can only provide their comments to the performances of the artists. The winner will earn a spot in the six artist-slots per team and will advance to the next round, the Live shows.

Prior to the battle of vocals, each team will be guided and trained by their respective coaches with the aid of some "guest advisers." Arnel Pineda, the frontman of Journey, aided apl.de.ap's team; while Gerard Salonga, an orchestrator and musical director, accompanied his sister Lea Salonga. On the other hand, Gary Valenciano helped Sarah Geronimo; while Joey Ayala, a contemporary pop music artist, joined Bamboo Mañalac.

The first episode aired on July 28, 2013. The Battles aired until August 17, 2013.

In some episodes guests were invited to perform for the show, while the coaches and their guest advisers performed in the remaining episodes of the Battles. During the first episode, Yeng Constantino, KZ Tandingan, and Charice performed "Locked out of Heaven" by Bruno Mars. On the second episode aired last August 3, 2013, coach Sarah Geronimo and her guest adviser, Gary Valenciano, performed "Clarity" by Zedd; while Bamboo Mañalac and Joey Ayala performed Mañalac's "Ikot ng Mundo" on the third episode aired last August 4, 2013. In the fourth episode aired on August 10, 2013, it was Lea Salonga along with her brother, Gerard Salonga, performed in the Battle stage. Lea sang "Grenade" by Bruno Mars while Gerard was at the piano playing the song. On August 11, 2013, apl.de.ap, together with A.K.A Jam member Jhelsea Flores, performed a medley of his songs and his group, The Black Eyed Peas. In the middle of the episode aired on August 17, 2013, the Gonzaga sisters made a special number were they performed "Heart Attack" by Demi Lovato.

Color key

Artist won the Battle and advanced to the Live shows
Artist lost the Battle and was eliminated

Episode	Coach	Order	Artists			Song	Source
Episode 14 (July 28)	apl.de.ap	1	Stan Perfecto	Lorenzana Siblings		"Signed, Sealed, Delivered"	
Episode 14 (July 28)	Bamboo Mañalac	2	Lee Grane Maranan	Dan Billano		"One"	
Episode 14 (July 28)	Sarah Geronimo	3	Morissette	Lecelle Trinidad		"No More Tears"	
Episode 14 (July 28)	Lea Salonga	4	Mitoy Yonting	Chien Berbana		"Alone"	
Episode 15 (August 3)	apl.de.ap	1	Sir Lord Lumibao	Thor		"I'll Make Love to You"	
Episode 15 (August 3)	Lea Salonga	2	Diday Garcellano	Japs Mendoza		"Daylight"	
Episode 15 (August 3)	Sarah Geronimo	3	Kathreen Castro	Yuki Ito		"Baliw"	
Episode 15 (August 3)	Bamboo Mañalac	4	Nicole Parada	Angelique Alcantara	Deborah Victa	"Set Fire to the Rain"	
Episode 16 (August 4)	Bamboo Mañalac	1	Cordovales Father & Son	Paolo Onesa		"Panalangin"	
Episode 16 (August 4)	Lea Salonga	2	Taw Muhammad	Kimpoy Mainit		"Without You"	
Episode 16 (August 4)	apl.de.ap	3	Cara Manglapus	Moira dela Torre	Penelope Matanguihan	"One Night Only"	
Episode 16 (August 4)	Sarah Geronimo	4	Junji Arias	Dave Jonathan Lamar		"Bohemian Rhapsody"	
Episode 17 (August 10)	Bamboo Mañalac	1	Isabella Fabregas	Angelica Prado		"Don't Speak"	
Episode 17 (August 10)	apl.de.ap	2	Janice Javier	Lance Fabros		"Don't Stop Believin'"	
Episode 17 (August 10)	Lea Salonga	3	MJ Podolig	Darryl Shy		"Tuwing Umuulan at Kapiling Ka"	
Episode 17 (August 10)	Sarah Geronimo	4	Eva delos Santos	Michaellen Temporada		"I Just Can't Stop Loving You"	
Episode 18 (August 11)	Sarah Geronimo	1	Maki Ricafort	Hans Dimayuga		"What About Love?"	
Episode 18 (August 11)	apl.de.ap	2	Jessica Reynoso	Emmanuelle Vera		"Just Give Me a Reason"	
Episode 18 (August 11)	Bamboo Mañalac	3	Denise Sagun	Talia Reyes		"Under the Bridge"	
Episode 18 (August 11)	Lea Salonga	4	Juvie Pelos	Rainer Acosta	RJ dela Fuente	"What's Going On"	
Episode 19 (August 17)	apl.de.ap	1	Cora dela Cruz	Jessica Corpuz		"Makita Kang Muli"	
Episode 19 (August 17)	Bamboo Mañalac	2	Myk Perez	John Philip Duka		"Hey Jude"/"Come Together"	
Episode 19 (August 17)	Sarah Geronimo	3	Klarisse de Guzman	Gabriel Ramos	Rouxette Swinton	"Somebody That I Used to Know"	
Episode 19 (August 17)	Lea Salonga	4	Radha	Marissa Saroca		"Respect"	

== Live shows ==
The Voice of the Philippines Live show stage at the Newport Performing Arts Theater, Resorts World Manila.

The Live Shows first aired on August 25, 2013 at the Newport Performing Arts Theater, a theater with a 1,500 audience capacity, Resorts World Manila in Newport City, Pasay, Metro Manila. It aired every Sundays and was the only part of the show which was broadcast live. A total of twenty-four artists, or six artists per team, made it to the last stage of the competition. For each live show, all four coaches pitted half of his/her team whom all performed a solo number on stage for the public's votes. Differentiating from its foreign counterparts, the performances and the results were aired on the same night. The voting lines were immediately opened after all the performances per team are finished. Viewers were then given approximately 10 minutes during commercial break to vote for which artist from each team should advance. During Saturday episodes, the show highlighted the life stories of the artists, and coaching and mentoring sessions called The Life Shows. The show served as a companion episode to the Live show to be aired the following day. Prior to the Live shows, a special episode was aired on August 18, 2013 which highlighted the coaches and their respective artists' bonding and coaching moments, and their preparation for the Live shows.

The voting system for the Live shows was based on the public's decision through different platforms (text messaging, using vote cards, and iTunes downloads of the studio versions of the artists' performances), and by the coaches. Each week during the first two Live shows, the accumulated votes from the public chose the first artist to advance from each team. Their respective coaches chose the second. From the third Live shows, the iTunes bonus took effect and the artists' was decided by an equal say from both the public's vote and their respective coach's scores. In the Finals, each team was represented by one artist and the winner of the competition was only decided by the public's vote.

On September 17, 2013, the setup for the fifth Live show was changed wherein it is composed of two episodes, one of which had replaced The Life Shows episode. The voting mechanics was also changed. Voting lines were still opened during the 10-minute commercial gap wherein the accumulated votes for the Saturday and Sunday episodes were summed up. The fifth Live show also featured an à la Battle performance wherein the final two artists per team performed one song, deviating from the usual solo performances of the artists from the four other Live shows.

Color key

Artist was saved by the Public's votes
Artist was saved by his/her coach.
Artist's song reached in the Top 10 of iTunes
Artist was eliminated

=== Weeks 1 & 2 (August 25 & September 1) ===
After the Top 24 were decided, with six finalists for each coach, August 25, 2013 saw the launching of the live shows with half of the teams performing.

Public voting across multiple platforms commenced at this point, with two artists eliminated from each participating team in the first two live shows. Voting lines were opened immediately after the broadcast of each live show. Each team will advance four artists, with two drawing from public votes and two from the coach's choice.

Episode	Coach	Order	Artist	Song	Votes	Result
Episode 22 (Sunday, August 25, 2013)	Lea Salonga	1	Darryl Shy	"Danny's Song"	51.41%	Public's choice
Episode 22 (Sunday, August 25, 2013)	Lea Salonga	2	Radha	"River Deep – Mountain High"	unrevealed	Lea's choice
Episode 22 (Sunday, August 25, 2013)	Lea Salonga	3	RJ dela Fuente	"I'll Stand by You"	unrevealed	Eliminated
Episode 22 (Sunday, August 25, 2013)	apl.de.ap	4	Cora dela Cruz	"Nosi Ba Lasi"	unrevealed	Eliminated
Episode 22 (Sunday, August 25, 2013)	apl.de.ap	5	Thor	"Narito"	43.63%	Public's choice
Episode 22 (Sunday, August 25, 2013)	apl.de.ap	6	Jessica Reynoso	"I Believe"	unrevealed	Apl's choice
Episode 22 (Sunday, August 25, 2013)	Bamboo Mañalac	7	Talia Reyes	"You Oughta Know"	unrevealed	Eliminated
Episode 22 (Sunday, August 25, 2013)	Bamboo Mañalac	8	Myk Perez	"California Gurls"/"Isn't She Lovely?"	54.80%	Public's choice
Episode 22 (Sunday, August 25, 2013)	Bamboo Mañalac	9	Lee Grane Maranan	"Make You Feel My Love"	unrevealed	Bamboo's choice
Episode 22 (Sunday, August 25, 2013)	Sarah Geronimo	10	Eva delos Santos	"So Far Away"	unrevealed	Sarah's choice
Episode 22 (Sunday, August 25, 2013)	Sarah Geronimo	11	Junji Arias	"I Don't Want to Miss a Thing"	unrevealed	Eliminated
Episode 22 (Sunday, August 25, 2013)	Sarah Geronimo	12	Morissette	"Jar of Hearts"	57.16%	Public's choice
Episode 24 (Sunday, September 1, 2013)	Bamboo Mañalac	1	Angelique Alcantara	"Nobela"	unrevealed	Eliminated
Episode 24 (Sunday, September 1, 2013)	Bamboo Mañalac	2	Paolo Onesa	"You Give Me Something"	46.37%	Public's choice
Episode 24 (Sunday, September 1, 2013)	Bamboo Mañalac	3	Isabella Fabregas	"You've Got a Friend"	unrevealed	Bamboo's choice
Episode 24 (Sunday, September 1, 2013)	Sarah Geronimo	4	Yuki Ito	"A Song for You"	unrevealed	Eliminated
Episode 24 (Sunday, September 1, 2013)	Sarah Geronimo	5	Klarisse de Guzman	"Beggin'"	unrevealed	Sarah's choice
Episode 24 (Sunday, September 1, 2013)	Sarah Geronimo	6	Maki Ricafort	"Without You"	36.75%	Public's choice
Episode 24 (Sunday, September 1, 2013)	apl.de.ap	7	Penelope Matanguihan	"Ordinary People"	unrevealed	Apl's choice
Episode 24 (Sunday, September 1, 2013)	apl.de.ap	8	Stan Perfecto	"When I Was Your Man"	unrevealed	Eliminated
Episode 24 (Sunday, September 1, 2013)	apl.de.ap	9	Janice Javier	"I Believe I Can Fly"	42.82%	Public's choice
Episode 24 (Sunday, September 1, 2013)	Lea Salonga	10	Diday Garcellano	"Rumour Has It"	unrevealed	Eliminated
Episode 24 (Sunday, September 1, 2013)	Lea Salonga	11	Kimpoy Mainit	"Hallelujah"	unrevealed	Lea's choice
Episode 24 (Sunday, September 1, 2013)	Lea Salonga	12	Mitoy Yonting	"Don't Stop Me Now"	82.29%	Public's choice

Non-competitive Performances
Order	Performer	Song
22.1	apl.de.ap, Bamboo Mañalac, and Week 1 performing artists (Cora dela Cruz, Thor, Jessica Reynoso, Talia Reyes, Myk Perez, and Lee Grane Maranan)	"The Apl Song"
22.2	Lea Salonga, Sarah Geronimo, and Week 1 performing artists (Darryl Shy, Radha, RJ dela Fuente, Eva delos Santos, Junji Arias, and Morissette)	"Tag-Ulan"
22.3	Lea Salonga, apl.de.ap, and Week 2 performing artists (Penelope Matanguihan, Stan Perfecto, Janice Javier, Diday Garcellano, Kimpoy Mainit, and Mitoy Yonting)	"I'd Do Anything for Love"
22.4	Sarah Geronimo, Bamboo Mañalac, and Week 2 performing artists (Angelique Alcantara, Paolo Onesa, Isabella Fabregas, Yuki Ito, Klarisse de Guzman, and Maki Ricafort)	"Live It Up"
24.1	Sarah Geronimo, and Week 1 winning artists (Eva delos Santos and Morissette)	"Roar"

=== Weeks 3 & 4 (September 8 & 15) ===
After the Top 16 were decided, with four finalists for each coach, August 25, 2013 saw the launching of the live shows with half of the teams performing.

Public voting across multiple platforms commenced at this point, with two artists eliminated from each participating team in the first two live shows. Voting lines were opened immediately after the broadcast of each live show.

For the first week, four artists reached the Top 10 of the Philippine iTunes chart. Darryl Shy peaked at #1, Paolo Onesa at #3, Morissette at #5, and Maki Ricafort at #10.

For the second week, Myk Perez peaked at #1, Radha at #2, Klarisse de Guzman at #3, and Isabella Fabregas' version of "No One" peaked at #9.

Episode	Coach	Order	Artist	Song	Summary of points			Result
Episode	Coach	Order	Artist	Song	Coach's	Public's	Total	Result
Episode 26 (Sunday, September 8, 2013)	Sarah Geronimo	1	Morissette	"What About Love"	60.00	50.41	110.41	Safe
Episode 26 (Sunday, September 8, 2013)	Sarah Geronimo	2	Maki Ricafort	"Every Breath You Take"	40.00	49.59	89.59	Eliminated
Episode 26 (Sunday, September 8, 2013)	Lea Salonga	3	Darryl Shy	"Balita"	40.00	55.89	95.89	Eliminated
Episode 26 (Sunday, September 8, 2013)	Lea Salonga	4	Mitoy Yonting	"Paano"	60.00	44.11	104.11	Safe
Episode 26 (Sunday, September 8, 2013)	Bamboo Mañalac	5	Lee Grane Maranan	"Losing My Religion"	40.00	18.76	58.76	Eliminated
Episode 26 (Sunday, September 8, 2013)	Bamboo Mañalac	6	Paolo Onesa	"Skyfall"	60.00	81.24	141.24	Safe
Episode 26 (Sunday, September 8, 2013)	apl.de.ap	7	Penelope Matanguihan	"Superstar"	45.00	35.28	80.28	Eliminated
Episode 26 (Sunday, September 8, 2013)	apl.de.ap	8	Thor	"Lately"	55.00	64.72	119.72	Safe
Episode 28 (Sunday, September 15, 2013)	apl.de.ap	1	Janice Javier	"Chain of Fools"	65.00	39.88	104.88	Safe
Episode 28 (Sunday, September 15, 2013)	apl.de.ap	2	Jessica Reynoso	"Ikaw"	35.00	60.12	95.02	Eliminated
Episode 28 (Sunday, September 15, 2013)	Sarah Geronimo	3	Eva delos Santos	"Ikaw Lang Ang Mamahalin"	45.00	31.09	76.09	Eliminated
Episode 28 (Sunday, September 15, 2013)	Sarah Geronimo	4	Klarisse de Guzman	"I Can't Make You Love Me"	55.00	68.91	123.91	Safe
Episode 28 (Sunday, September 15, 2013)	Bamboo Mañalac	5	Isabella Fabregas	"No One"/"Where Is The Love?"	45.00	33.87	78.87	Eliminated
Episode 28 (Sunday, September 15, 2013)	Bamboo Mañalac	6	Myk Perez	"Chasing Pavements"	55.00	66.13	121.13	Safe
Episode 28 (Sunday, September 15, 2013)	Lea Salonga	7	Kimpoy Mainit	"Weak"	40.00	34.50	74.50	Eliminated
Episode 28 (Sunday, September 15, 2013)	Lea Salonga	8	Radha	"Time After Time"	60.00	65.50	125.50	Safe

Non-competitive Performances
Order	Performer	Song
26.1	Week 3 performing artists (Morissette, Maki Ricafort, Darryl Shy, Mitoy Yonting, Lee Grane Maranan, Paolo Onesa, Penelope Matanguihan, and Thor)	"Another One Bites the Dust"
26.2	Lea Salonga, Patti Austin, and Week 4 performing artists (Janice Javier, Jessica Reynoso, Eva delos Santos, Klarisse de Guzman, Isabella Fabregas, Myk Perez, Kimpoy Mainit, and Radha)	"If I Believe" / "In my Life"
28.1	Bamboo Mañalac and Week 3 winning artists (Thor, Morissette, Mitoy Yonting, and Paolo Onesa)	"Wonderwall"

=== Week 5: Semifinals (September 21 & 22) ===
The fifth Live show was aired as a two-part episode. The September 21 episode also served as special charity event in benefit of the Payatas Kids Choir.

Recorded versions of the Top 4’s performances on Sunday made the Top 10 iTunes charts, with De Guzman at No 3, Perez at No. 4, and Javier at No. 7. The Top 4 contestants' original songs peaked the top four slots of the chart.

Coach	Artist	Episode 29 (Saturday, September 21, 2013)		Episode 30 (Sunday, September 22, 2013)		Summary of points			Result
Coach	Artist	Order	à la Battles song	Order	Solo song	Coach's	Public's	Total	Result
apl.de.ap	Thor	1	"Umagang Kay Ganda"	7	"Climb Ev'ry Mountain"	45.00	42.15	87.15	Eliminated
apl.de.ap	Janice Javier	1	"Umagang Kay Ganda"	8	"Imagine"	55.00	57.85	112.85	Safe
Bamboo Mañalac	Myk Perez	2	"Change the World"	3	"Baby, I Love Your Way"	55.00	48.08	103.08	Safe
Bamboo Mañalac	Paolo Onesa	2	"Change the World"	4	"Elesi"	45.00	51.92	96.92	Eliminated
Lea Salonga	Mitoy Yonting	3	"Against All Odds"	1	"The Power of Love"	45.00	63.78	108.78	Safe
Lea Salonga	Radha	3	"Against All Odds"	2	"Let It Be"	55.00	36.22	91.22	Eliminated
Sarah Geronimo	Klarisse de Guzman	4	"The Voice Within"	6	"To Love Somebody"	55.00	63.39	118.39	Safe
Sarah Geronimo	Morissette	4	"The Voice Within"	5	"Who You Are"	45.00	36.61	81.61	Eliminated

Non-competitive Performances
Order	Performer	Song
29.1	Top 8 artists (Thor, Janice Javier, Myk Perez, Paolo Onesa, Mitoy Yonting, Radha, Klarisse de Guzman, and Morissette)	"Hawak Kamay"
29.2	Top 8 artists with the Payatas Kids Choir	"Paraiso"
30.1	apl.de.ap, Venus Raj, and Top 8 Artists	"Balikbayan"
30.2	Mitoy Yonting (team winner)	"Bulag"
30.3	Myk Perez (team winner)	"Fix You"
30.4	Klarisse de Guzman (team winner)	"Slowly"
30.5	Janice Javier (team winner)	"Coming Home"

=== Week 6: The Final Showdown (September 28 & 29) ===
Just like the previous Live show, the finale was also aired as a two-part episode. It also had a different set of voting mechanics. Eligibility to download songs from iTunes and through mobile truetone downloads were opened immediately after the end of the fifth Live show wherein each song downloaded was equal to 5 votes per artist. Voting lines were opened at the start of the first episode of the finale and was temporarily paused after. The votes accumulated on Saturday were then summed up with the votes accumulated from the downloads. The results of the votes were then revealed on the second episode of the finals, where the final two artists had to perform in a final showdown. After the two top artists were revealed, the scores were reset to zero. The voting lines were then opened for the final two, wherein the artist who garnered the highest votes was declared the winner of the competition. The finals was held in Newport Performing Arts Theater, Resorts World Manila, Pasay.

Color key

Artist was proclaimed as the winner
Artist ended as the runner-up
Artist ended as the third placer
Artist ended as the fourth placer
Artist was advanced on the second round

==== First round ====
Coach	Artist	Episode 31 (Saturday, September 28, 2013)				Episode 32 (Sunday, September 29, 2013)			Votes	Result
Coach	Artist	Order	Solo song	Order	Original song	Order	Performance with Coach and Guest	with	Votes	Result
apl.de.ap	Janice Javier	1	"The Greatest Love of All"	4	"Coming Home"	3	"Himig Ng Pag-ibig"/"The Time"	apl.de.ap & Lolita Carbon	13.56%	Third place
Lea Salonga	Mitoy Yonting	2	"Anak"	3	"Bulag"	4	"Total Eclipse of the Heart"	Lea Salonga & Vice Ganda	unrevealed	Advanced
Bamboo Mañalac	Myk Perez	3	"Give Me Love"	2	"Fix You"	2	"Morning Rose"	Bamboo Mañalac & Lim Olmo	12.81%	Fourth place
Sarah Geronimo	Klarisse de Guzman	4	"The Climb"	1	"Slowly"	1	"Your Song"	Sarah Geronimo & Robert Seña	unrevealed	Advanced

==== Second round ====
Coach	Artist	Order	Final showdown song	Votes	Result
Sarah Geronimo	Klarisse de Guzman	1	"Magsimula Ka"	42.35%	Runner-up
Lea Salonga	Mitoy Yonting	2	"Help!"	57.65%	Winner

Non-competitive Performances
Order	Performer	Song
31.1	Top 4 Artists	"Some Nights" / "We Are Young"
31.2	Resorts World Special Acts	–
31.3	Top 4 and their coaches	"Will You Be There"
32.1	Klarisse de Guzman	"I'm Every Woman"
32.2	Myk Perez	"Everything"
32.3	Janice Javier	"We Found Love"
32.4	Mitoy Yonting	"Leaving on a Jet Plane"
32.5	Shane Filan and Top 4 Artists	"Fool Again" / "Uptown Girl"
32.6	The Voice Coaches	"Man in the Mirror"

== Elimination Chart ==
=== Results summary ===
Color key
Artist's info

- Artist from Team apl
- Artist from Team Lea
- Artist from Team Sarah
- Artist from Team Bamboo

Result details

- Winner
- Runner-up
- Third place
- Fourth Place
- Artist was saved by the public
- Artist was saved by his/her coach
- Artist was saved after receiving the highest accumulated points
- Artist did not perform on that particular week
- Eliminated

Artist	Week 1	Week 2	Week 3	Week 4	Week 5	Week 6	
Artist	Week 1	Week 2	Week 3	Week 4	Week 5	Round 1	Round 2
Mitoy Yonting		Safe^{2}	Safe		Safe	Safe	Winner
Klarisse de Guzman		Safe		Safe	Safe	Safe	Runner-up
Janice Javier		Safe^{2}		Safe	Safe	Third place	Eliminated (Week 6)
Myk Perez	Safe^{1}			Safe	Safe	Fourth place	Eliminated (Week 6)
Morissette	Safe^{1}		Safe		Eliminated	Eliminated (Week 5)	
Paolo Onesa		Safe^{2}	Safe		Eliminated	Eliminated (Week 5)	
Radha	Safe			Safe	Eliminated	Eliminated (Week 5)	
Thor	Safe^{1}		Safe		Eliminated	Eliminated (Week 5)	
Eva delos Santos	Safe			Eliminated	Eliminated (Week 4)		
Isabella Fabregas		Safe		Eliminated	Eliminated (Week 4)		
Kimpoy Mainit		Safe		Eliminated	Eliminated (Week 4)		
Jessica Reynoso	Safe			Eliminated	Eliminated (Week 4)		
Lee Grane Maranan	Safe		Eliminated	Eliminated (Week 3)			
Penelope Matanguihan		Safe	Eliminated	Eliminated (Week 3)			
Maki Ricafort		Safe^{2}	Eliminated	Eliminated (Week 3)			
Darryl Shy	Safe^{1}		Eliminated	Eliminated (Week 3)			
Angelique Alcantara		Eliminated	Eliminated (Week 2)				
Diday Garcellano		Eliminated	Eliminated (Week 2)				
Yuki Ito		Eliminated	Eliminated (Week 2)				
Stan Perfecto		Eliminated	Eliminated (Week 2)				
Junji Arias	Eliminated	Eliminated (Week 1)					
Cora dela Cruz	Eliminated	Eliminated (Week 1)					
RJ dela Fuente	Eliminated	Eliminated (Week 1)					
Talia Reyes	Eliminated	Eliminated (Week 1)					

=== Per Team ===
Artist's info

- Artist from Team apl
- Artist from Team Lea
- Artist from Team Sarah
- Artist from Team Bamboo

Result details

- Winner
- Runner-up
- Third place
- Fourth place
- Artist did not perform on that particular week
- Eliminated
- Artist reached the top 10 of iTunes.
- Number of performances reached Top 10 on iTunes

Artist	Week 1	Week 2	Week 3	Week 4	Week 5	Week 6	
Artist	Week 1	Week 2	Week 3	Week 4	Week 5	Round 1	Round 2
Janice Javier		Public's Choice^{2}		Advanced	Advanced	Third place	
Thor	Public's Choice^{1}		Advanced		Eliminated		
Jessica Reynoso	Coach's Choice			Eliminated			
Penelope Matanguihan		Coach's Choice	Eliminated				
Stan Perfecto		Eliminated					
Cora dela Cruz	Eliminated						
Mitoy Yonting		Public's Choice^{2}	Advanced		Advanced	Advanced	Winner
Radha	Coach's Choice			Advanced	Eliminated		
Kimpoy Mainit		Coach's Choice		Eliminated			
Darryl Shy	Public's Choice^{1}		Eliminated				
Diday Garcellano		Eliminated					
RJ dela Fuente	Eliminated						
Klarisse de Guzman		Coach's Choice		Advanced	Advanced	Advanced	Runner-up
Morissette	Public's Choice^{1}		Advanced		Eliminated		
Eva delos Santos	Coach's Choice			Eliminated			
Maki Ricafort		Public's Choice^{2}	Eliminated				
Yuki Ito		Eliminated					
Junji Arias	Eliminated						
Myk Perez	Public's Choice^{1}			Advanced	Advanced	Fourth place	
Paolo Onesa		Public's Choice^{2}	Advanced		Eliminated		
Isabella Fabregas		Coach's Choice		Eliminated			
Lee Grane Maranan	Coach's Choice		Eliminated				
Angelique Alcantara		Eliminated					
Talia Reyes	Eliminated						

Notes

1. ^ ^{a} ^{b} ^{c} ^{d} Thor was automatically saved from elimination after he received 43.63% of the public's vote, the highest percentage in Team apl; in Team Lea, Darryl Shy received 51.41%; in Team Bamboo, Myk Perez received the 54.80%; and in Team Sarah, Morissette received 57.16%.
2. ^ ^{a} ^{b} ^{c} ^{d} Paolo Onesa was automatically saved from elimination after he received 46.37% of the public's vote, the highest percentage in Team Bamboo; In Team Sarah, Maki Ricafort received 36.75%; In Team apl, Janice Javier received 42.82%; and in Team Lea, Mitoy Yonting received 82.29%.

== Music releases ==
=== Singles ===
Every week since the third Live show, the songs performed by the artists were digitally available on iTunes for download. The versions released on the online platform were studio versions of the songs they have performed.

Stage	Artist	Song	Originally by	Released on	Source
Third Live show	Morissette	"What About Love"	Heart	Digitally released on iTunes (September 8, 2013)	
Third Live show	Maki Ricafort	"Every Breath You Take"	The Police	Digitally released on iTunes (September 8, 2013)	
Third Live show	Darryl Shy	"Balita"	Asin	Digitally released on iTunes (September 8, 2013)	
Third Live show	Mitoy Yonting	"Paano"	Dulce	Digitally released on iTunes (September 8, 2013)	
Third Live show	Lee Grane Maranan	"Losing My Religion"	R.E.M.	Digitally released on iTunes (September 8, 2013)	
Third Live show	Paolo Onesa	"Skyfall"	Adele	Digitally released on iTunes (September 8, 2013)	
Third Live show	Penelope Matanguihan	"Superstar"	Delaney & Bonnie and Friends	Digitally released on iTunes (September 8, 2013)	
Third Live show	Thor	"Lately"	Stevie Wonder	Digitally released on iTunes (September 8, 2013)	
Fourth Live show	Janice Javier	"Chain of Fools"	Aretha Franklin	Digitally released on iTunes (September 15, 2013)	
Fourth Live show	Jessica Reynoso	"Ikaw"	Sharon Cuneta	Digitally released on iTunes (September 15, 2013)	
Fourth Live show	Eva delos Santos	"Ikaw Lang Ang Mamahalin"	Joey Albert	Digitally released on iTunes (September 15, 2013)	
Fourth Live show	Klarisse de Guzman	"I Can't Make You Love Me"	Bonnie Raitt	Digitally released on iTunes (September 15, 2013)	
Fourth Live show	Isabella Fabregas	"No One"	Alicia Keys	Digitally released on iTunes (September 15, 2013)	
Fourth Live show	Myk Perez	"Chasing Pavements"	Adele	Digitally released on iTunes (September 15, 2013)	
Fourth Live show	Kimpoy Mainit	"Weak"	SWV	Digitally released on iTunes (September 15, 2013)	
Fourth Live show	Radha	"Time After Time"	Cyndi Lauper	Digitally released on iTunes (September 15, 2013)	
Fifth Live show	Thor	"Climb Ev'ry Mountain"	Shirley Bassey	Digitally released on iTunes (September 22, 2013)	
Fifth Live show	Thor	"Antay"	Ariel Rivera	Digitally released on iTunes (September 22, 2013)	
Fifth Live show	Janice Javier	"Imagine"	John Lennon	Digitally released on iTunes (September 22, 2013)	
Fifth Live show	Janice Javier	"Coming Home"	Diddy – Dirty Money	Digitally released on iTunes (September 22, 2013)	
Fifth Live show	Paolo Onesa	"Elesi"	Rivermaya	Digitally released on iTunes (September 22, 2013)	
Fifth Live show	Paolo Onesa	"Lucky in Love"	The Rolling Stones	Digitally released on iTunes (September 22, 2013)	
Fifth Live show	Myk Perez	"Baby, I Love Your Way"	Big Mountain	Digitally released on iTunes (September 22, 2013)	
Fifth Live show	Myk Perez	"Fix You"	Coldplay	Digitally released on iTunes (September 22, 2013)	
Fifth Live show	Radha	"Let It Be"	The Beatles	Digitally released on iTunes (September 22, 2013)	
Fifth Live show	Radha	"Huwag Kang Mainis"	Ed Lapiz	Digitally released on iTunes (September 22, 2013)	
Fifth Live show	Mitoy Yonting	"The Power of Love"	Jennifer Rush	Digitally released on iTunes (September 22, 2013)	
Fifth Live show	Mitoy Yonting	"Bulag"	Randy Santiago	Digitally released on iTunes (September 22, 2013)	
Fifth Live show	Morissette	"Who You Are"	Jessie J	Digitally released on iTunes (September 22, 2013)	
Fifth Live show	Morissette	"Begin"	Morissette	Digitally released on iTunes (September 22, 2013)	
Fifth Live show	Klarisse de Guzman	"To Love Somebody"	Bee Gees	Digitally released on iTunes (September 22, 2013)	
Fifth Live show	Klarisse de Guzman	"Slowly"		Digitally released on iTunes (September 22, 2013)	
Finals	Janice Javier	"The Greatest Love of All"	Whitney Houston	Digitally released on iTunes (September 30, 2013)	
Finals	Mitoy Yonting	"Anak"	Freddie Aguilar	Digitally released on iTunes (September 30, 2013)	
Finals	Myk Perez	"Give Me Love"	Ed Sheeran	Digitally released on iTunes (September 30, 2013)	
Finals	Klarisse de Guzman	"The Climb"	Miley Cyrus	Digitally released on iTunes (September 30, 2013)	

=== Albums ===
Two albums were released in September 2013 with the Top 16 artists' studio version of the songs they performed on the Third and Fourth Live shows, and the Top 8 artists' original songs all produced and distributed by MCA/Universal.

== Reception ==
=== Critical reception ===
During the pilot episode, the show received fairly negative reviews from the viewers emphasizing the design of the infamous red chairs, and set. The show was also observed having longer commercial loads ending up to a huge gaps per show. The coaches' opening performance was also deemed unrehearsed. Pooled reviews from novices of the franchise stated that the coaches were found to be a bit exaggerated on television. Avid fanatics of the franchise however explained that certain aspects of the said coaches can also be seen across franchises. Ms. Lea Salonga together with her fellow coaches were even bashed on Twitter. On an article written by Joey Aquino of The People's Journal on June 21, 2013, Aquino commented that Salonga has already gave much prestige to the country and with the bashing that had happened on Twitter, Salonga deserves much respect that she is entitled.

Aside from the pilot week reviews and criticisms, the show was also criticized for Bamboo Mañalac's controversial decisions. Mañalac received many negative comments after the season one's first episode of the Battles aired last July 28, 2013 after he made a controversial choice on picking Lee Grane Maranan over Dan Billano. The two performed the ballad song "One" by U2, wherein Maranan was vocally outperformed by Billano. Billano was even praised by Joey Ayala, Mañalac's guest adviser during the Battles, and that according to him Billano was the clear winner of that Team Bamboo's first vocal battle. Billano was also praised by apl.de.ap; while Maranan was praised by Lea Salonga for her emotional delivery of the song. Mañalac's choice of letting Maranan win over Billano was based on the former's soulfulness and emotions rather than basing the result on the two's vocal performances, which caused rave of negative comments from the netizens. It is noted that Maranan was a crowd favorite during her Blind auditions. Maranan undeniably admitted her loss over Billano but he thanked her coach for picking her and later added a promise that she will do better in the next round of the competition.

=== Television ratings ===
Television ratings for the first season of The Voice of the Philippines on ABS-CBN were gathered from two major sources, namely from AGB Nielsen and Kantar Media. AGB Nielsen's survey ratings were gathered from Mega Manila households, while Kantar Media's survey ratings were gathered from urban and rural households all over the Philippines.

Episode		Original airdate	Timeslot (PST)	AGB Nielsen			Kantar Media			Source
Episode		Original airdate	Timeslot (PST)	Rating	Timeslot	Primetime	Rating	Timeslot	Primetime	Source
1	"The Blind auditions premiere"	June 15, 2013	Saturday 9:00 p.m.	27.8%	#1	#1	30.5%	#1	#2	
2	"The Blind auditions – part 2"	June 16, 2013	Sunday 8:15 p.m.	24.2%	#2	#3	27.7%	#1	#1	
3	"The Blind auditions – part 3"	June 22, 2013	Saturday 9:00 p.m.	28.5%	#1	#1	32.0%	#1	#2	
4	"The Blind auditions – part 4"	June 23, 2013	Sunday 8:15 p.m.	25.3%	#1	#2	29.2%	#1	#1	
5	"The Blind auditions – part 5"	June 29, 2013	Saturday 9:00 p.m.	26.3%	#1	#2	28.0%	#1	#3	
6	"The Blind auditions – part 6"	June 30, 2013	Sunday 8:15 p.m.	26.6%	#2	#2	29.1%	#1	#1	
7	"The Blind auditions – part 7"	July 6, 2013	Saturday 9:00 p.m.	25.8%	#1	#1	27.4%	#1	#3	
8	"The Blind auditions – part 8"	July 7, 2013	Sunday 8:15 p.m.	27.5%	#2	#2	30.8%	#1	#1	
9	"The Blind auditions – part 9"	July 13, 2013	Saturday 9:00 p.m.	27.3%	#1	#1	29.9%	#1	#3	
10	"The Blind auditions – part 10"	July 14, 2013	Sunday 8:15 p.m.	25.7%	#2	#2	31.3%	#1	#1	
11	"The Blind auditions – part 11"	July 20, 2013	Saturday 9:00 p.m.	27.4%	#1	#1	28.7%	#1	#3	
12	"The Blind auditions – part 12"	July 21, 2013	Sunday 8:15 p.m.	26.2%	#2	#2	27.8%	#1	#1	
13	"The Blind auditions – part 13"	July 27, 2013	Saturday 9:00 p.m.	24.9%	#1	#1	26.7%	#1	#3	
14	"The Battles premiere"	July 28, 2013	Sunday 8:15 p.m.	26.2%	#2	#3	28.9%	#1	#1	
15	"The Battles – part 2"	August 3, 2013	Saturday 9:00 p.m.	23.1%	#1	#3	27.6%	#1	#3	
16	"The Battles – part 3"	August 4, 2013	Sunday 8:15 p.m.	23.7%	#2	#3	29.2%	#1	#1	
17	"The Battles – part 4"	August 10, 2013	Saturday 9:00 p.m.	18.6%	#3	#7	23.6%	#1	#3	
18	"The Battles – part 5"	August 11, 2013	Sunday 8:15 p.m.	15.7%	#2	#8	20.8%	#2	#4	
19	"The Battles – part 6"	August 17, 2013	Saturday 9:00 p.m.	23.7%	#2	#4	23.5%	#1	#4	
20	"Highlights"	August 18, 2013	Sunday 8:15 p.m.	17.8%	#3	#6	20.0%	#1	#5	
21	"The Life shows premiere"	August 24, 2013	Saturday 9:00 p.m.	19.2%	#2	#5	20.5%	#1	#5	
22	"The Live shows premiere"	August 25, 2013	Sunday 8:15 p.m.	22.8%	#1	#3	22.5%	#1	#3	
23	"The Life shows – part 2"	August 31, 2013	Saturday 9:00 p.m.	18.3%	#2	#5	21.1%	#1	#4	
24	"The Live shows – part 2"	September 1, 2013	Sunday 8:15 p.m.	17.4%	#2	#5	21.4%	#1	#2	
25	"The Life shows – part 3"	September 7, 2013	Saturday 9:00 p.m.	17.0%	#2	#7	20.3%	#1	#4	
26	"The Live shows – part 3"	September 8, 2013	Sunday 8:15 p.m.	18.6%	#2	#3	22.4%	#1	#3	
27	"The Life shows – part 4"	September 14, 2013	Saturday 9:00 p.m.	16.0%	#2	#9	17.2%	#1	#7	
28	"The Live shows – part 4"	September 15, 2013	Sunday 8:15 p.m.	17.6%	#2	#6	19.8%	#2	#6	
29	"Semifinals – part 1"	September 22, 2013	Saturday 9:00 p.m.	19.0%	#2	#7	18.5%	#1	#4	
30	"Semifinals – part 2"	September 23, 2013	Sunday 8:15 p.m.	21.3%	#3	#5	23.4%	#1	#3	
31	"Finals – part 1"	September 28, 2013	Saturday 9:00 p.m.	22.8%	#2	#6	24.3%	#1	#4	
32	"Finals – part 2"	September 29, 2013	Sunday 8:15 p.m.	27.7%	#1	#2	30.3%	#1	#1	
Season average				22.81%	#2	#4	25.44%	#1	#3	
