= Dave Lamar =

Filipino singer-songwriter (born 1992)

- Born: Dave Jonathan diGesu Lamar; December 20, 1992 (age 33); Manila, Philippines
- Occupations: Singer; songwriter; producer; director
- Years active: 2011–present
- Agent: Underdog Music PH
- Spouse: Morissette (m. 2021)
- Musical career
- Genres: Pop; R&B
- Instruments: Vocals; guitar
- Member of: From The Sea
- Website: set.page/davelamar/

Dave Jonathan Lamar (born December 20, 1992) is an American-Filipino singer, songwriter, record producer, and director.

== Early life ==
Dave Jonathan Lamar was born on December 20, 1992, in Manila, Philippines. Born to an American mother and a Filipino father, he is the oldest child and has two siblings, Micah and Catherine. He is a Christian. His parents ran an orphanage called Faith Hope & Love Kids’ Ranch (2003–2019) in Sariaya, Quezon.

== Career ==
=== Television competition shows ===
In 2013 Lamar participated in the first season of the Philippine version of The Voice. He performed "The Man Who Can't Be Moved" by The Script, and Sarah Geronimo selected him for her team. During the Battle Round, he lost to Junji Arias and failed to advance to the live shows. The two performed "Bohemian Rhapsody" by the band Queen.

In 2015 Lamar auditioned for the fourteenth season of American Idol.

=== From the Sea ===
In 2021 Lamar and his fiancee Morissette wedded and established a musical duo, From the Sea. The name derives from his last name, which translates to "the sea" in Spanish. In 2022, they released debut eponymous EP, which served as the soundtrack of their wedding. On June 28, 2023, they released their first album, If We Never Happened. On July 7 of the same year, the duo had their first concert together at the Music Museum titled "Feels Like Home", at which they launched the album.

== Personal life ==
Lamar married singer-songwriter Morissette on June 28, 2021. They had begun a relationship 8 years earlier, and both competed on the first season of The Voice of the Philippines in 2013.

== Filmography ==
Morissette's television credits
Year	Title	Role	Notes	Ref(s)
2011	Fan*tastik	Himself	Guest	
2013	The Voice of the Philippines	Himself	Contestant	
2015	American Idol	Himself	Contestant	

== Discography ==
=== Studio albums ===
List of studio albums, with selected details
Title	Album details	Ref(s)
If We Never Happened	Artists: with From the Sea and Morissette; Released: June 28, 2023; Label: Underdog Music PH; Formats: Digital download, streaming	

=== Extended plays ===
List of extended plays with relevant details
Title	Album details	Ref.
Detours	Released: March 20, 2016; Label: Variant Records and Underdog Music PH; Formats: Digital download, streaming; Track listing: 1. Drown Me in Your Love; 2. Pictures; 3. Castle; 4. Dirty Little Secrets; 5. You Should Be Here; 6. Call It Falling	
Homesick	Released: February 1, 2019; Label: Cornerstone Music; Formats: Digital download, streaming; Track listing: 1. Hi, Kamusta?; 2. Feel My Love; 3. Something Only We Know; 4. Palagi; 5. Time Machine; 6. I Miss You	
From The Sea	Artists: with From the Sea and Morissette; Released: January 28, 2022; Label: Underdog Music PH; Formats: Digital download, streaming; Track listing: 1. Free; 2. Up And Away; 3. True North; 4. Luna	

=== Singles ===
List of singles, showing year released and album name
Title	Year	Album	Ref.
As lead artist
"Come Out Come Out"	2013	Non-album singles	
"Happiest Man On Earth"	2014	Non-album singles	
"Christmas Miss List"	2014	Non-album singles	
"Feel My Love"	2018	Homesick EP	
"Something Only We Know"	2019	Homesick EP	
"Choices"	2020	Non-album singles	
"Desperate for Love"	2020	Non-album singles	
"Always" (with Orien Hills)	2022	Non-album singles	
"Boundless"	2022	Non-album singles	
"Different"	2023	Non-album singles	
"How to Love (Nanny's Song)"	2023	Non-album singles	
"Will You Stay (His Version)" (with From The Sea and Morissette)	2023	If We Never Happened	
"Something Only We Know (Her Version)" (with From The Sea and Morissette)	2023	If We Never Happened	
As featured artist
"A Feel Good Song About a High School Prom" (Signalgiant featuring Dave Lamar)	2022	Non-album single	

== Concerts ==
- Feels Like Home (with Morissette) (2023)

== Awards and nominations ==
Name of the award ceremony, year presented, nominee(s) of the award, category, and the result of the nomination
Award	Year (Note: Indicates the year of ceremony. Each year is linked to the article about the awards held that year, wherever possible.)	Recipient(s) and nominee(s)	Category	Result	Ref(s)
Awit Awards	2022	"Up and Away"	Favorite Song	Nominated	
Awit Awards	2022	"Luna"	Favorite Song	Nominated	
Awit Awards	2022	Himself, Morissette, From the Sea	Favorite Group Artist	Nominated	
