= Rose Marielle Mamaclay =

- Born: Rose Marielle T. Mamaclay; Cabanatuan City, Nueva Ecija, Philippines
- Occupations: Singer, voice coach
- Known for: WCOPA Grand Champion Performer; member of 5thGen; X Factor Malta contestant

Rose Marielle Mamaclay (also known as Marielle Corpus) is a Filipino singer and voice coach from Cabanatuan City, Nueva Ecija, Philippines. She gained international recognition after being crowned Grand Champion Performer of the World at the 14th World Championships of Performing Arts (WCOPA) in 2010, winning multiple gold medals. She was also one of the Filipinos who dominated in WCOPA winners’ list in subsequent years.

She served as a mentor and participant on X Factor Malta, impressing judges with her performances and advancing to the semi-finals. Her elimination sparked strong reactions from locals, with commentary about the fairness of non-Maltese contestants being referred to as culturally divisive. She also expressed gratitude after her exit, saying, “I hope you’ll remember me,” to her fans.

== Career ==
Mamaclay's early prominence came from her success at the WCOPA, where she represented the Philippines and won the Grand Champion Performer of the World title in 2010.

She later joined the vocal group 5thGen, which released the album Contagious in 2015 under Vega Entertainment Productions, and performed on the Wish 107.5 Bus with her groupmates.

In television and film, Mamaclay appeared on The Voice of the Philippines (2013) as a performer. In 2017, she appeared in the TV special R3.0 as herself. She also portrayed the character Rosario in the Philippine TV series Jhon en Martian (2019).

== Discography ==
=== With 5thGen ===
- Contagious (2015) – Vega Entertainment Productions

== Awards and recognition ==
- Grand Champion Performer of the World, WCOPA (2010)
- Multiple gold medals, WCOPA (2010)
