= Junji Arias =

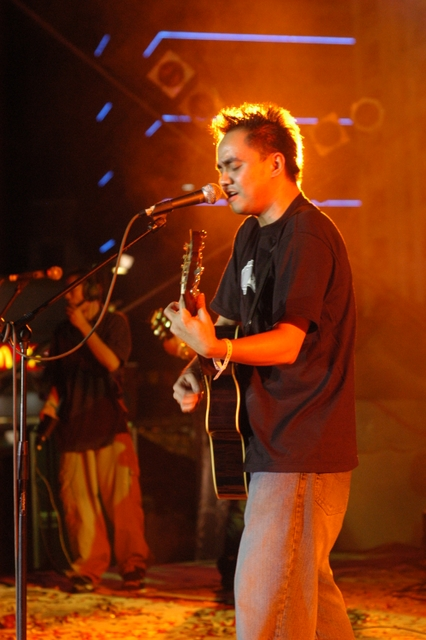
- Junji Arias during the Oktoberfest 2003

Background information
- Born: Anthony James Arias; August 5, 1976 (age 50); Makati, Philippines
- Genres: Rock, pop, OPM
- Occupations: Singer, composer, producer, entrepreneur
- Instruments: Vocals, guitar, keyboards, other percussion instruments
- Years active: 1993–2014
- Labels: Warner Music Philippines, Viva Records
- Formerly of: Excerpt, Velcro

Anthony James Arias, better known for his stage name Junji Arias, is a Filipino singer, record producer, composer, and was the former vocalist and chief songwriter for the band, Excerpts (1993–1999) and Velcro (1999–2008). Arias has been well known for his raw, sharp-edged raspy vocals. He was one of the pioneers of the acoustic Rock alternative scene during the late 1990s and early 2000s. He is also musically versatile, playing a wide range of instruments, including the guitar, keyboards, and several percussion instruments.

Arias auditioned for the first season of The Voice of the Philippines where he was able to join Sarah Geronimo's team. He was able to go to reach the team's final 6 before getting eliminated.

== Background ==
Arias was born on August 5, 1976, in Makati, Philippines to Atty. Ariel Arias and jewellry designer, Redenta Villegas. He is the nephew of renowned author, curator, jeweller, antiquities dealer and poet, Ramon Villegas and descendant of Philippine revolutionary General Miguel Malvar. He began his education at Colegio San Agustin-Makati, but got into a lot of trouble growing up and went on to different high schools to finish, then to college at International Academy of Management and Economics, taking up a degree majoring in Management and Economics.

He is married to French model and financial advisor, Anais Arias.

== Career ==
=== Beginnings and early success ===
He began his singing career as a solo act, at the age of 17, at Ka Freddies in Tagaytay in 1993 after being discovered by international folk star, Freddie Aguilar. He released his first album under Warner Music Philippines with the band Excerpts in 1999. In 2000, he formed Velcro, an acoustic group together with Rivermaya drummer, Mark Escueta, and coExcerpts member and lead guitarist, James Diaz. This trio pioneered the acoustic rock band scene in the early 2000's and made the Cajón a staple in the local music scene. They were later joined by veteran musicians, Bolichie Suzara of Freestyle on Bass and Alex Fidel of Parliament Syndicate on Drums. Their combination of genres created a unique pop alternative rock sound in their debut album, "Ubod ng Lakas na Dikoryenteng Kombo" which was released in 2004 and was distributed by Viva Records.

He was also able to collaborate with different artists, including Rachel Alejandro, Rico Blanco, Jay Durias, and Top Suzara. He composed, arranged and co-produced Geneva Cruz's album, "To Manila", which was released October 2013. He also composed jingles for different commercial ads. He co-owned the now defunct iconic Bar and music venue Capone's Bistro with Jay Server together with Rivermaya's Rico Blanco, and Mark Escueta which ruled the Makati nightlife scene for several years in the 2000s.

In 2007, he released his single "98 Seconds" in Germany and China.

=== The Voice of the Philippines ===
In June 2013, he joined The Voice of the Philippines wherein he sang "I'll Be There for You" by Bon Jovi. He was able to make Lea Salonga, Bamboo Mañalac, and Sarah Geronimo turn their respective chairs. He later picked the latter as his coach. During the Battles, he was paired up with Dave Lamar where they sang "Bohemian Rhapsody." Arias later won that round and which made him advanced to the Live shows. In the first Live show, he sang Aerosmith's "I Don't Want to Miss a Thing while suffering from mononucleosis." He was later eliminated after Geronimo picked Eva delos Santos over him.

=== Post The Voice of the Philippines ===
After ending his stint in The Voice of the Philippines, Arias continued his career in doing musical gigs at both local and international venues. Until 2015, he decided to focus on fatherhood and expanding his Travel company. In 2022, he wrote and produced Geneva Cruz comeback single, "Sinungaling" and co-wrote carrier single of pop duo, Suzara, entitled "Kakalimutan". In 2026, Velcro released previously unreleased original recordings from the early 2000's on all music platforms.

== Discography ==
With Excerpts

- Sunday Jam sa Tagaytay
- Una

With Velcro

- Ubod ng Lakas na Dikoryenteng Kombo
- The Closer (Close up toothpaste commercial)
- Released

Solo albums

- 98 Seconds
- Six Pack Blues

Collaborations

- Hearts Desire (album) (with Rachel Alejandro)
- To Manila (album) (with Geneva Cruz)
- Sinungaling (with Geneva Cruz)
- Kakalimutan (with Suzara)
