= Jacob Benedicto =

Filipino singer and actor

- Born: Josemari Jacob K. Gayanelo; April 29, 1992 (age 34); Manila, Philippines
- Occupations: Singer; actor; host
- Years active: 2012–present
- Agents: FameFactory, Inc. (2012–present) Star Magic (2014–2015); Active Social Management (2015–present)
- Musical career
- Genres: Pop; soul; OPM
- Instrument: Vocals
- Years active: 2014–present
- Label: Star Music (2014–2015)

Jacob Benedicto is a Filipino singer and actor born in Manila. He first gained recognition when he joined the blind auditions of The Voice of the Philippines. Although none of the judges' chairs turned, Benedicto dominated social media because of his good looks and soulful voice. The following year, in April 2014, he joined Pinoy Big Brother: All In. Dubbed as the "Cutie Crooner ng Paranaque", Jacob spent 5 weeks inside the house and was the 4th housemate to be evicted on the 3rd elimination night.

== ABS-CBN Career ==
Benedicto is currently a regular on the ABS-CBN series Dream Dad as Jaymart. His first single "Pagka't Ikaw" is also included in the newly launched 'OPM Fresh' album from Star Music.

== Filmography ==
=== Television ===
Year	Title	Role
2015	Baker King	Alex
2015	Ningning	Hope's boyfriend
2015	Pinoy Big Brother: 737	Himself/Houseguest
2015	Dream Dad	Jaymart
2014	Ipaglaban Mo! "Akin Ka Lang"	James
2014	Maalaala Mo Kaya "Manika"	Albert
2014	Pure Love	Diane's Classmate
2014	Pinoy Big Brother: All In	Himself/Housemate
2014	The Voice of the Philippines (season 1)	Himself/Contestant
2013	Kanta Pilipinas	Himself/Contestant

=== Film ===
Year	Title	Role	Note
2014	Past Tense	Diego	

== Discography ==
=== Singles ===
Year	Title	Composer	Album	Label
2015	Pagka't Ikaw	Jeffrey Hidalgo	OPM Fresh	Star Music
