= Radha Cuadrado =

Filipino singer and actress (born 1976)

- Born: December 13, 1976 (age 49); Manila, Philippines
- Occupations: Singer; actress
- Years active: 1986–present
- Known for: Being the lead vocalist of Kulay
- Musical career
- Instruments: Vocals; guitar
- Formerly of: 14-K; Kulay; Dye Vest

Radha Cuadrado (born December 13, 1976) is a Filipino singer and actress best known as an original member of the Filipino-Canadian hip-hop group Kulay. Prior to that, she was part of the group 14-K. After leaving Kulay, Cuadrado pursued a solo career and performed in theater and lounge shows. She later starred in the TV series Diva on GMA 7. She also took part in the first season of The Voice of the Philippines and the second season of Masked Singer Pilipinas.

== Career ==
=== Early work ===
Cuadrado began performing at a young age. She sang in church, in family gatherings, and at school in St. Theresa's College in Quezon City. By age ten, she was performing professionally, singing "Tomorrow" from the musical Annie for the revue The Great White Way. She learned to play the guitar at 13 years and joined the group 14-K, formed by Ryan Cayabyab with Jolina Magdangal, Arnee Hidalgo, and Tenten Muñoz, for two years.

=== Kulay ===
Her big break came at the age of 15, when she became the lead singer of the hip-hop group Kulay, which also included her cousin Boom Dayupay and his girlfriend Jennie Oakman. They released their debut album, 100,000 Pesos Worth of Karma, in 1995. In 1997, they were signed internationally by Sony Music Entertainment. Cuadrado left the group in 2000. That year, she performed two songs live with the rock band Wolfgang, which were later included on their album Acoustica.

=== Solo musical career ===
In 2001, she embarked on a solo career, signing with Ronnie Henares' agency Primeline. She took part in the Himig Handog song contest JAM: Himig Handog sa Makabagong Kabataan, performing the song "You Can Make It Happen", written by Dodjie Simon and Ellis Simon. This won her the Best Pop Female Vocal Performance award at the 8th Katha Awards in 2002. She then recorded a duet with Martin Nievera, "Why Can't We?" She also performed in theaters as well as putting on lounge shows. She additionally performed with Jed Madela and Aliya Parcs in the band Dye Vest at night clubs for a brief period in the early 2000s.

=== Other activities ===
Cuadrado went on to make several appearances on television, beginning with the series Diva in 2010. In 2013, she successfully auditioned for the first season of The Voice of the Philippines and eventually advanced to the live shows, managing to reach the semi-finals. She held several concerts, including one with Bituin Escalante and Frenchie Dy in 2016, a revue with Basti Artadi in 2017, and a benefit concert for the Antipolo City Special Education Center in 2018. She also dabbled in modeling. In 2019, she performed at the ASOP Music Festival.

In 2022, Cuadrado competed in season two of Masked Singer Pilipinas as "Cara-bow". In 2025, she featured in a TEDx Talk held in Bonifacio Global City. She also appeared in the Philippine productions of the musicals Once on This Island and The Bodyguard: The Musical.

== Artistry ==
Cuadrado's influences include Aretha Franklin, Mary J. Blige, Stevie Wonder, Whitney Houston, Chaka Khan, Prince, and Otis Redding. She has a dramatic coloratura mezzo-soprano vocal range.

== Personal life ==
Cuadrado's grandmother is actress Lolita Rodriguez, and her grandfather is actor Eddie Arenas (whose real name was Eddie Cuadrado). As a plus-size performer since her departure from Kulay, she has become an advocate for body positivity.

== Discography ==
=== with Kulay ===
Album	Year
100,000 Pesos Worth of Karma	1995
Flavour of da Moment	1996
Vibestation	1997
Chapter What?	1999
Kulay Remixes	1999
Kulay: OPM Timeless Collection Gold Series 4	2000

== Filmography ==
=== Film ===
Year	Title	Role	Ref.
1999	Virtual Sexuality	Herself	

=== Television ===
Year	Title	Role	Ref.
1995	Music Bureau	Host	
2010	Diva	Maria	
2013	The Voice of the Philippines	Herself	
2022	Masked Singer Pilipinas	Cara-bow / herself	

== Theater ==
Year	Title	Role	Ref.
2005, 2024	Once on This Island	Asaka	
2025	The Bodyguard: The Musical	Ensemble	
