= Myk Perez =

- Also known as: Myk Perez
- Born: Don Micheal Perez; November 18, 1990 (age 35); Puerto Princesa, Palawan, Philippines
- Genres: Pop, soul, alternative rock, R&B
- Occupations: Singer, musician
- Instrument: Guitar
- Years active: 2010–present
- Label: MCA Universal

Don Micheal Perez (born November 18, 1990), known by his stage name Myk Perez, is a Filipino recording artist. He is best known for participating in the first season of The Voice of the Philippines where he finished in fourth place. Before competing on The Voice, Perez was a freelance singer in Palawan.

== Career ==
=== 1990-2011: Early life and musical beginnings ===
Don Micheal Perez, nicknamed 'Myk' was born on November 18, 1990, was raised in Puerto Princesa, Palawan, Philippines. He is the son of Olive Viray Perez (died June 2010) and Amador Dizon Perez Jr. Perez attended Conservatory of Music in University of Santo Tomas in Manila.

=== 2013: The Voice ===
In late 2012, Perez auditioned in the first season of the Voice of the Philippines in ABS-CBN Palawan in Puerto Princesa.

During the blind audition, he sang his own rendition of Jason Mraz's "Im Yours" where four of the judges, Apl.de.Ap, Lea Salonga, Sarah Geronimo and Bamboo Mañalac, turned their chairs. He chose to be part with Bamboo who noted a "match made in heaven". The episode was aired on June 30.

On August 17, 2013, Perez won in the battle round through the public vote against John Paul Dunca. They sang a cover of the Beatles' "Hey Jude" remixed with the song "Come Together".

In the live show performances, Perez sang a cover of Katy Perry's "California Gurls" in sequenced with the song "Isn't She Lovely" where he received mixed comments from judges. He however saved by the public votes. On September 15, of week four, he sang an acoustic cover of "Chasing Pavements" in which he paired to compete with Isabella Fabregas who sang a remix of "No One" and "Where Is The Love". In result, he won with the total points of 121, consisting 55 percent by his coach, Bamboo and 66 by the public votes.

In week five; September 21, the semi-finals, he sang an acoustic rendition of "Change The World". The live performance was also part of charity works. On September 22, he crooned a cover of "Baby I Love Your Way" wherein he scored 55 percent given by the coach against Paolo Onesa and was declared as the finalist for team Bamboo, with the total score of 103 points.

In finals, of first night on September 28, Perez performed an acoustic soul cover of Ed Sheeran's "Give Me Love" to which he received noble self-esteem remarks by his coach. After the accounted performances, he then sang his original song "Fix You". In the second night and final performances, he performed a duet with his coach in the song "Morning Rose". Perez, however eliminated in results of final four and declared as fourth placer in the competition.

The Voice also have had going beyond in iTunes Philippines, Perez's "Chasing Pavements" and "Fix You" were both peaked at #1 in the Philippines and #11 in Asia Pacific in iTunes chart. His studio version in "Baby, I Love Your Way" and "Give Me Love" also tops at #6 and #4, respectively.

Table – The Voice performances and results
Round	Song	Original artist	Order	Result
Blind Audition	"I'm Yours"	Jason Mraz	43	Apl.de.Ap, Lea Salonga, Sarah Geronimo and Bamboo Mañalac; Perez joined Bamboo's Team.
Battle Round	"Hey Jude"/"Come Together" (vs. Philip D.)	The Beatles	22	Saved (Public Vote)
Top 24	"California Gurls"/"Isn't She Lovely?"	Katy Perry/Stevie Wonder	8	Safe
Top 16	"Chasing Pavements"	Adele	14	Safe
Semi-Final/Top 8	"Change the World"	Eric Clapton	2	Safe
Semi-Final/Top 8	"Baby, I Love Your Way"	Peter Frampton	3	Safe
Finals/Top 4	"Give Me Love"	Ed Sheeran	2	Eliminated, Fourth placer
Finals/Top 4	"Morning Rose"	Bamboo Mañalac	2	Eliminated, Fourth placer
Original Song	"Fix You"	Himself	3	Sang after the results (Semi & finals)
– Studio version of the song reached the iTunes Top 10

== Discography ==
Album

- My Acoustic (2014)

Compilation

- The Voice Season 1 (2013)

As a featured artist

- "Almost Is Never Enough" with Sabrina (2014)

== Appearances ==
- Kris TV
- ASAP 18
- Minute to Win It
- Myx Philippines (August 28, 2013)
- It's Showtime (September 26, 2013)
- Gandang Gabi, Vice! (October 2013)
