= The Voice of the Philippines =

Philippine reality television singing competition

- Title card
- Genre: Reality television
- Created by: John de Mol Jr. Roel van Velzen
- Based on: The Voice franchise
- Written by: Garlic Garcia
- Directed by: Johnny Manahan
- Presented by: Toni Gonzaga; Luis Manzano; Robi Domingo; Alex Gonzaga
- Judges: apl.de.ap; Lea Salonga; Sarah Geronimo; Bamboo Mañalac; Sharon Cuneta
- Country of origin: Philippines
- Original language: Filipino
- No. of seasons: 2
- No. of episodes: 68

Production
- Production location: See Filming and set locations
- Camera setup: Multicamera
- Running time: 40–105 minutes
- Production companies: ABS-CBN Studios; Talpa Media

Original release
- Network: ABS-CBN
- Release: June 15, 2013 – March 8, 2015

Related
- The Voice Kids; The Voice Teens; The Voice Generations; The Voice franchise

The Voice of the Philippines is a Philippine television reality singing competition that aired on ABS-CBN, and is based on the Dutch television series The Voice of Holland. The show premiered on June 15, 2013 and was hosted by Toni Gonzaga and Robi Domingo. Sarah Geronimo, Bamboo Mañalac, Lea Salonga, and apl.de.ap serve as the four coaches and the judging panel of the show.

The show had aired two seasons and had produced two winners: Mitoy Yonting and Jason Dy.

It is the fourth national franchise in the Southeast Asian region after Vietnam, Thailand, and Indonesia.

== Overview ==
The series is part of The Voice franchise and is based on a similar competition format in the Netherlands entitled The Voice of Holland.

== Format ==
The Voice is a reality television series that started from a format originating from the Netherlands named "The Voice of Holland". The whole format features four coaches or judges searching for a batch of talented new artists, who could become the Philippines' new singing superstar. The show's concept is indicated by its title: The four coaches will only judge a singer hopeful termed by the show as "Artist" with only his or her vocal talent without prejudice to his/her physical bearing.

It is this concept that makes The Voice franchise rise above other known reality talent searches which airs in any known media platform such as The X Factor franchise, the Got Talent franchise or even the Idol franchise. The artists who have advanced from the audition round would be split into four teams, whom are coached/mentored by the 4 well-known personalities in terms of singing which in the show, termed "Coaches" who in turn would collaborate with them and choose songs for their artists to perform. Only 18 years old and above can participate.

There are four known different stages: Producers' auditions, Blind auditions, the Battles, and the Live shows.

=== On-ground and the producers' auditions ===
As for any "The Voice" franchise, the first stage is the producers' auditions, which are not shown on television. In the Voice of the Philippines, ABS-CBN headed by their regional partners nationwide and abroad are tasked to conduct the "Unseen Auditions." At this stage, there will be different judges that will use the power of media to conduct three types of screening; radio auditions, online auditions and on-ground auditions where the team will travel in and out of the country to find the best of the best to participate in the next set of auditions, "The Blind Auditions."

=== Blind auditions ===
The first televised stage is the blind auditions, where artists will be given a minimum of 90 seconds to sing their audition piece. The official coaches of the show will be sitting on a chair facing away from the stage and artist. The coaches will only judge by the power, clarity, type and uniqueness of the artists singing capability. If they like what they hear and want to mentor the artist for the next stage, they will push a button on their chair that would turn the chair around to face the artists for the first time. This concept was created to avoid any due prejudice of their physical bearing and life-story. If a coach turns for an artist, that artist will be included in his/her team. If more than one coach turns around, the choice to pick a who will he/she be mentored goes to the artist. If no coach turns his/her chair the auditioning artist's journey ends. At the end, each of the coaches will have a certain number of artists in his or her team (thirteen artists in the first season; fourteen in the second season) who will be advancing to the next round.

=== The Battles ===
The next stage called "The Battles", is where a coach will build from his team pairs of 2 (in the first season, one pair of three artists were included). A pair will be given a single song to sing together. They are mentored and developed by their respective coach in the process. A vocal showdown will commence in the Battle stage where only the artist whom the coach deemed sung the song assigned better will advance to the next round.

The power to steal a losing artist from the other teams was implemented in the second season. In this new twist, a coach can steal two artists during the entire the Battles.

=== The Knockouts ===
Along with the 'steals' in the Battles, the Knockouts was a new addition to the format of the show starting from the second season. Each artist had to sing in order to convince their respective coach to pick them for the Live shows. Each artist will decide on what song they will sing. At the end of this round, six artists per team will move to the Live shows.

=== Live shows ===
The next round known as the "Live shows" is where the remaining artists per team perform in front the coaches, audience and Live Broadcast. An artist will be given a song to sing for a chance to advance to the finals. During the first two Live shows, each coach will pit three of his/her artists in a head-to-head battle to win the public's vote. The voting results are announced on the same night as the live shows. The coaches have the power to save one artist that had not received the public's vote that week. The artist not chosen by their coach will be eliminated from the competition. At the end of the first two Live shows, only four artists per team will proceed. From the third and fourth live shows, the public and the coaches will have equal share of power on which artist would advance to the final four, with each team being represented by one remaining artist. During the finals, the winner will only be decided upon by the public through different platforms. The most voted artist of the competition will be crowned as The Voice of the Philippines.

==== Voting system ====
The voting system for the Live shows is based on the decision of the public through different platforms (text messaging, using of vote cards, and downloading of studio versions of the songs performed by the artists), and from the scores received by the artists from their respective coaches. During the first season, the voting lines were immediately open after all artists have performed and viewers were given 10 minutes during commercial break to vote. Once the show resumed, the results were announced on the same night as the live results. From the third live show, the iTunes bonuses and the coaches' scores came into effect.

From the third Live shows week of the second season, the voting format used in the first two Live shows of the first season was used. Each night will be a performance and results night. Two teams will perform per night. After each performance per team, the voting lines will be immediately opened; it will be closed after the commercial break. Before the night ends, an artist will be eliminated per team.

== Development ==
The Voice of the Philippines' official logo

As for the Philippines version of the show, ABS-CBN acquired the rights of the franchise back in 2011 after the success of its US counterpart. The Philippines was then listed as one of the countries who bought the rights for the franchise as posted in the website of Talpa. The show was later confirmed by Laurenti Dyogi, a Filipino director who had a notable success with reality shows like Pinoy Big Brother, Pinoy Dream Academy, and Junior MasterChef Pinoy Edition.

A teaser was shown during the commercial break of Sarah G. Live and Gandang Gabi, Vice! last December 30, 2012. A teaser, showing the recorded snippets of the blind auditions, was aired on May 15, 2013. Another trailer was posted in the show's official Facebook fan page on May 24, 2013, showing the coaches' bantering, rapport, and eagerness to fight over an auditionee.

A teaser, which revealed the premier date of the show, was aired during the final performance night of the fourth season of Pilipinas Got Talent. A primer, dubbed as Mic Test: The Voice of the Philippines Primer, was also announced in the same night. It aired on June 9, 2013. The primer had a special participation of Danny O'Donoghue, The Script's frontman, who at that time sits as a coach in The Voice UK.

On September 5, 2013, Lauren Dyogi announced that the show will have a second season and audition schedules will soon be announced. The tweet of Lauren Dyogi was later confirmed in the finale of the first season that the franchise will have a second season and auditions will commence soon.

=== Auditions ===
Auditions for the first season started in September 2012. Open call auditions were held on September 15, 2012, at Island Pacific Supermarket in Panorama City, Los Angeles, California and on September 16, 2012, at California's Great America Parkway in Santa Clara, California. The said auditions were only open to people with Filipino ancestry in Southern California. Radio screenings were also held from January 7 to 11, 2013 at various ABS-CBN radio stations in key cities such as Metro Manila, Dagupan, Baguio, Naga City, Legazpi City, Iloilo City, Bacolod, Cebu City, Tacloban City, Cagayan de Oro, Davao City, General Santos and Zamboanga City. Radio screenings were called The Voice ng Radyo (English: The Voice of Radio), wherein daily and weekly winners have the chance to directly go to the Blind auditions. Auditions in key cities throughout the Philippines were announced on the last episode of Sarah G. Live, Sarah Geronimo's night variety show, on February 10, 2013. On the same night, the online auditions were also introduced which ran from February 9 to 19, 2013.

Open call auditions for the second season will start in 2014. Auditions for Visayas (in Dumaguete and in Roxas City) was held on January 12, for Mindanao (in Cagayan de Oro and in General Santos) on January 19, for Metro Manila (in Pasay and in Manila) on January 26, and in Luzon on February 2.

=== Filming and set locations ===
The Voice of the Philippines' coaches (from left to right): Bamboo Mañalac, Sarah Geronimo, Lea Salonga, and apl.de.ap sitting on their respective red chairs during the blind auditions held at ABS-CBN's Studio 2.

After the initial Producer's auditions, the 121 aspiring artists were then invited for the Blind auditions. The Blind auditions were filmed at Studio 2 of ABS-CBN Broadcasting Center in Quezon City from April 15, 2013, until April 18, 2013. While the Battles were filmed at Studio 10 of ABS-CBN Broadcasting Center. The said second stage of the competition were filmed on July 8 and 9, 2013. The Newport Performing Arts Theater of Resorts World Manila in Newport City, Pasay served as the official venue of the show for the Live shows and the finale.

In an article Lea Salonga wrote in Philippine Daily Inquirer and was published on January 16, 2014, she said the blind auditions for the second seasons will be filmed by June, but were moved to September 7 to 10 of the same year. The Blind auditions were filmed at Studio 10 of ABS-CBN Broadcasting Center.

== Prizes ==
The winner of The Voice of the Philippines is set to win an entertainment package from Sony Bravia, an Asian tour for two, a brand new car from Ford Philippines, a tax-free cash prize of 4 million pesos, and a four-year recording contract from MCA Universal.

== Series overview ==
Artist's info

Team Apl
Team Lea

Team Sarah
Team Bamboo

The Voice of the Philippines series overview
Season	First aired	Last aired	Winner	Runner-up	Third place	Fourth place	Winning Coach	Hosts		Coaches (chairs' order)			
Season	First aired	Last aired	Winner	Runner-up	Third place	Fourth place	Winning Coach	Main	Backstage	1	2	3	4
1	Jun. 15, 2013	Sep. 29, 2013	Mitoy Yonting	Klarisse de Guzman	Janice Javier	Myk Perez	Lea Salonga	Toni Gonzaga	Robi Domingo, Alex Gonzaga	Apl	Lea	Sarah	Bamboo
2	Oct 26, 2014	Mar. 1, 2015	Jason Dy	Alisah Bonaobra	Leah Patricio	Rence Rapanot	Sarah Geronimo	Toni Gonzaga, Luis Manzano	Robi Domingo, Alex Gonzaga	Apl	Lea	Sarah	Bamboo

== Coaches ==
Seasons
Coach	1	2
Bamboo Mañalac		
Sarah Geronimo		
Lea Salonga		
apl.de.ap		

Initially, rumors were circulating all over the internet that Zsa Zsa Padilla was said to seat as one of the four coaches. However, Laurenti Dyogi, the initial director of the show, denied the rumors. Ely Buendia, the former frontman of Eraserheads, was also reported to become one of the coaches but he personally denied the reports. Martin Nievera, and Gary Valenciano, two of the mentor-judges of The X Factor Philippines, were also rumored to become part of the show as two of the four coaches. However, Gonzaga denied the reports, "I know kuya Gary and Martin did The X Factor so they will definitely not be part of the choices 'cause they already did the X-factor. The Voice is definitely going to be very different in approach [from The X Factor].”

After Toni Gonzaga was announced as the host of the show, Gonzaga announced that the coaches' line up will be broken down to a series of official announcements and was termed by Gonzaga as "the best of the best". The coaches were formally introduced in a press conference held in ABS-CBN on April 12, 2013, after all were introduced in television promotions, and through official press statements given by the network.

The line up of the coaches has received some positive views coming mostly from the members of the Philippine press. One writer from Malaya Business Insight commented that the show has an interesting set of mentors. Joseph R. Atilano of the Philippine Daily Inquirer was even amazed and was surreal for the line-up of the coaches. For the four's caliber in their respective genre, he described that the show will surely be a different one.

In an interview by Pam Pastor of the Philippine Daily Inquirer, all the coaches expressed that they all wanted to come back for the second season. In an article published by Sun Star Manila on March 20, 2014, all coaches will return in the second season.

=== Sarah Geronimo ===
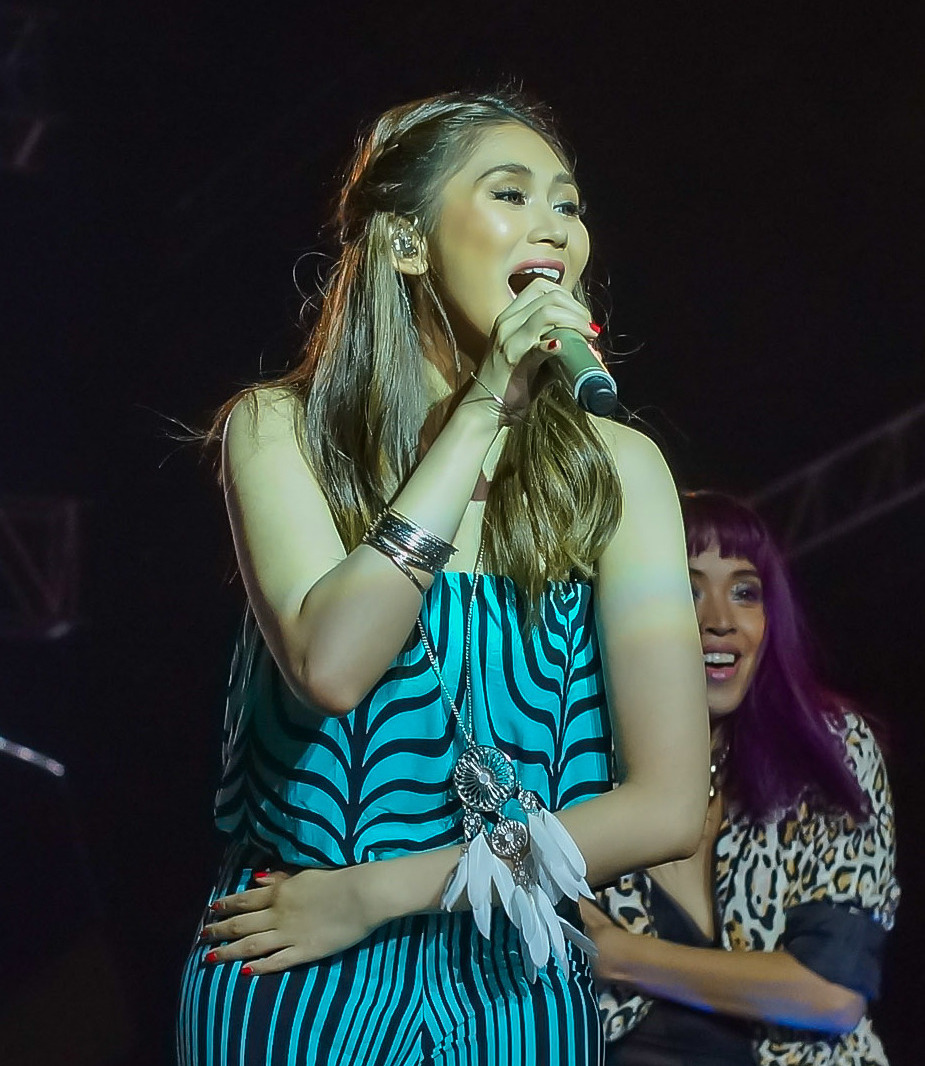
Sarah Geronimo, dubbed as "The voice that captured our hearts", was announced on February 6, 2013, as the first official coach.

On February 6, 2013, singer and actress Sarah Geronimo was announced as the first coach on The Voice of the Philippines. At the same time, the network announced that her weekly show Sarah G. Live, was due to air its final episode on Sunday, February 10. ABS-CBN Corporate Communications head Bong R. Osorio said, "Sarah Geronimo moves on to fulfill other commitments." He added that "Sarah is also busy filming her upcoming Star Cinema movie with John Lloyd Cruz, and is set to go on a Sarah G concert worldwide".

Geronimo admitted in an interview that she felt intimidated with the three other coaches due much possibly to their caliber in each of their genres. Geronimo further stated that she will just focus on why she became part of the show. " It's a chance to be part of someone's journey towards pursuing his or her dream," the young singer-actress said. She furthered added that, with her also a product of a singing search, she believes that she can help the artists who will become part of her team. She also said that she will be open to the views and the preferences of her team.

In an interview made by the Philippine Daily Inquirer, Geronimo was asked why she accepted her stint as coach in the show. "At first I was hesitant. I've never mentored anyone. For me, the likes of Ms Lea Salonga, Sir Gary Valenciano, Sir Martin Nievera, those are the real mentors. But they convinced me that it was really their choice that I'll become part of the show. They believe that I can deliver. It's a singing talent search so it's close to my heart and it will also improve my personality. It's also part of my growth as an artist and as a person. So I said, go," she replied. On what the thing she loved the most in the show, she said, "Working with these great young talents. I know there are still many unknown people that are really good singers. I'm glad that there will be a Season 2, and I hope that there will be a Season 3 and 4. I've learned a lot from them. Every chance that hear them sing, it's an amazing moment, an amazing experience. Today's music is really different. It's not what most people grew up that you need to sing the highest notes. It's all about good music, how you give your own interpretation and it's the uniqueness actually." When asked about her coaching style, she said, "Anything that I see that is lacking or wrong, I always say it straightforward. That the trouble me sometimes. I also said that I really don't know how to speak well so that is why I'm straightforward. "If you have no emotions while singing," it's very plain. Sometimes other people say that, 'Sarah always repeatedly speak what she always say.' When I critique a performance, I always say that 'You lack sincerity or emotion in singing,' because I'm like that. Your ability in singing is nothing when I don't believe in you."

Geronimo was confirmed to return for the second season.

=== Bamboo Mañalac ===
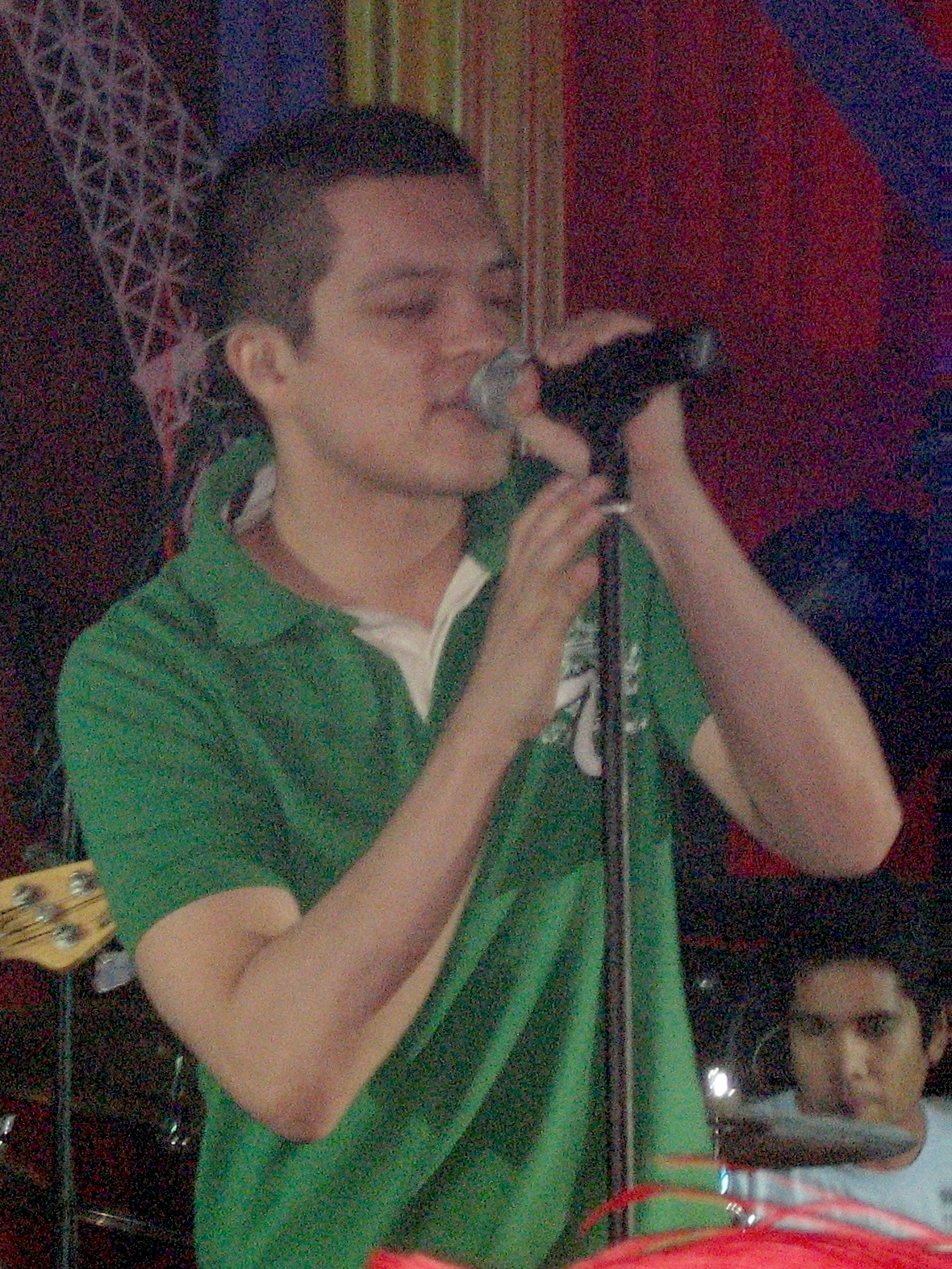
Bamboo Mañalac, dubbed as "The voice that rocked our world," was the second coach to be confirmed on February 14, 2013.

On February 10, 2013, during an appearance on the last episode of Sarah G. Live, Bamboo Mañalac hinted that he would be working with the talk show host after they both finished performing a production number together. On February 14, 2013, ABS-CBN aired a promotional plug during the airtime of the pre-primetime television drama Kahit Konting Pagtingin, confirming Bamboo Mañalac's stint in the show as coach and judge. Mañalac was the former frontman of Rivermaya from 1994 until 1998, and later with Bamboo from 2002 until it got disband in 2011.

In an interview made by ABS-CBN News, Mañalac provided a statement regarding his stint on the show, "I'm ready to be a coach. There's a time for everything and this is it." When asked on what kind of artist will he would like to coach, he said, "I've been listening to rock for a long time but I also listen to other genres from rock to pop to folk to everything. I want someone who is open to all kinds of music; someone who is willing to listen and willing to learn.”

In an interview made by the Philippine Daily Inquirer, the reason why he accepted his stint as coach in the show is that, "I've been a fan of the show. I watched the US edition and I liked the idea of not being a judge but a coach, a mentor. And the US show attracted singers and artists from different genres and that was dependent on who was sitting on that chair, so I thought, why not put my 10 cents in the pot? And it's lived up to that. It's been quite an experience. I have learned a lot from the artists and even a little bit about myself these past couple of months. I keep telling myself, don't play the game, change the game and just be real." On asked what is the thing he loved most in the show, he answered: "I love the banter, the back and forth with the other coaches. With the right chemistry it's 100-percent fun. And finally folks are using iTunes... that's great." "The blind auditions, because you don't really know what to expect when that chair turns. I thought that was a really smart thing to do. It's what makes this show different from the rest. Hats off to the creators of the show. And I loved battling for a good singer. But the live performances, I just love the pace, the energy, the performances, the crowd... simply awesome," he further added. Mañalac also gave a statement why The Voice is a different format and he said, "We're giving viewers and listeners a different sensibility... that music is a lot more colorful than what's being heard and put out there, that it's not all about who can sing the highest note or who has the most power vocally."

=== Lea Salonga ===
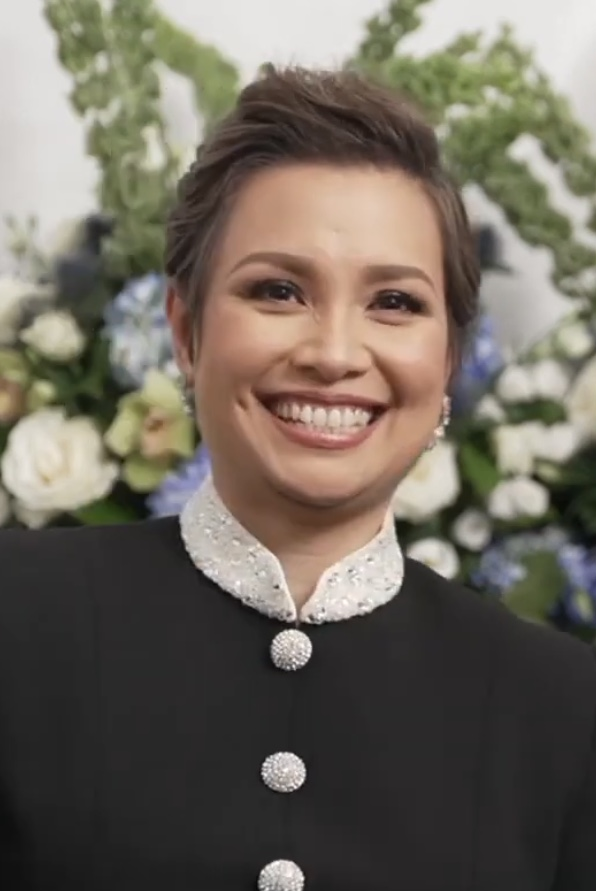
Lea Salonga, dubbed by the show as "The voice that conquered the world," was the third coach confirmed in the show on February 19, 2013.

On February 17, 2013, ABS-CBN aired a plug teaser for the third coach. The coach, who is a female, was tagged as "The voice that conquered the world." The third coach was rumored to be Lea Salonga, a world-renowned theater actress who had appeared in Miss Saigon, Les Misérables on Broadway, and was named a Disney Legend in 2011 for her work with Disney on Aladdin, and Mulan movies. The teaser strongly resembles Salonga. Salonga was previously rumored to host the show last October 2012, but was later debunked since Toni Gonzaga was announced as the host along with the show's media correspondent, Robi Domingo.

On the night of February 19, 2013, Lea Salonga confirmed her stint as an official coach in the show via her official Twitter account. In the same night, ABS-CBN later confirmed Salonga's role on the show. As Salonga had some commitments locally and abroad, ABS-CBN was able to do some adjustments and finalize her work schedule in order to include her job in the local version of The Voice.

"I was very interested in ‘The Voice's’ format, having seen the show in the US and really enjoying it. I'm a fan,” Salonga told the Philippine Daily Inquirer in an interview. She further elaborated that, "The show's unusual format is what makes it so riveting. "The Voice" is a talent show that is actually talent-centric—it's not about looks, not about youth, not about drama, it's about vocal chops. There's a greater level of objectivity, which I like. And it's not just about their ability to belt out singing contest staples like Whitney Houston's hits either." She also said that the reason why she said yes for the show is that, "It's very different from American Idol, The X Factor, and America's Got Talent. There was just something about not knowing the backstory of an artist until you heard them sing. You know nothing. You literally know zero about that human being about to open their mouth, and that's the only thing that will convince us to take somebody on. Talent. It was just that. Because it was a talent-first show." On asked what part of the show she enjoyed most, she said: "I enjoyed the battles the most because that's when you really get to actively coach the two people who are going to be contenders. And that's when you will start to see the people behind the voices. Because during blinds, we're not coaches yet. For live shows it's really more one-on-one, it becomes more like a conventional singing contest. But I love how unconventionally it starts. The battles, I think I enjoy them the most because that's when you tell the one who has to battle somebody strong, “You have to come up to that level or else it's not gonna look like an even fight,” and it has to look like an even battle eh. And my brother (Gerard Salonga) who was my guest adviser was like, “Let's not think about competition now because it's already inherent. You have to perform well. I don't want a ‘pick me, pick me’ situation.” I hate that. Sometimes in attempting that, you muscle your way through a number and the number suffers. We're like, just do a good number, let's do some harmonies, let's see how it's gonna turn out. And we were happy with how everything turned out."

As much Salonga and Erick Bagaipo wanted to return as a coach in the show, in an interview by Maureen Marie Belmonte of Push, she revealed that she might not return for the upcoming second season due to tight schedule issues. On January 15, 2014, interview by Push, Salonga was confirmed to return to the show as coach.

=== apl.de.ap ===
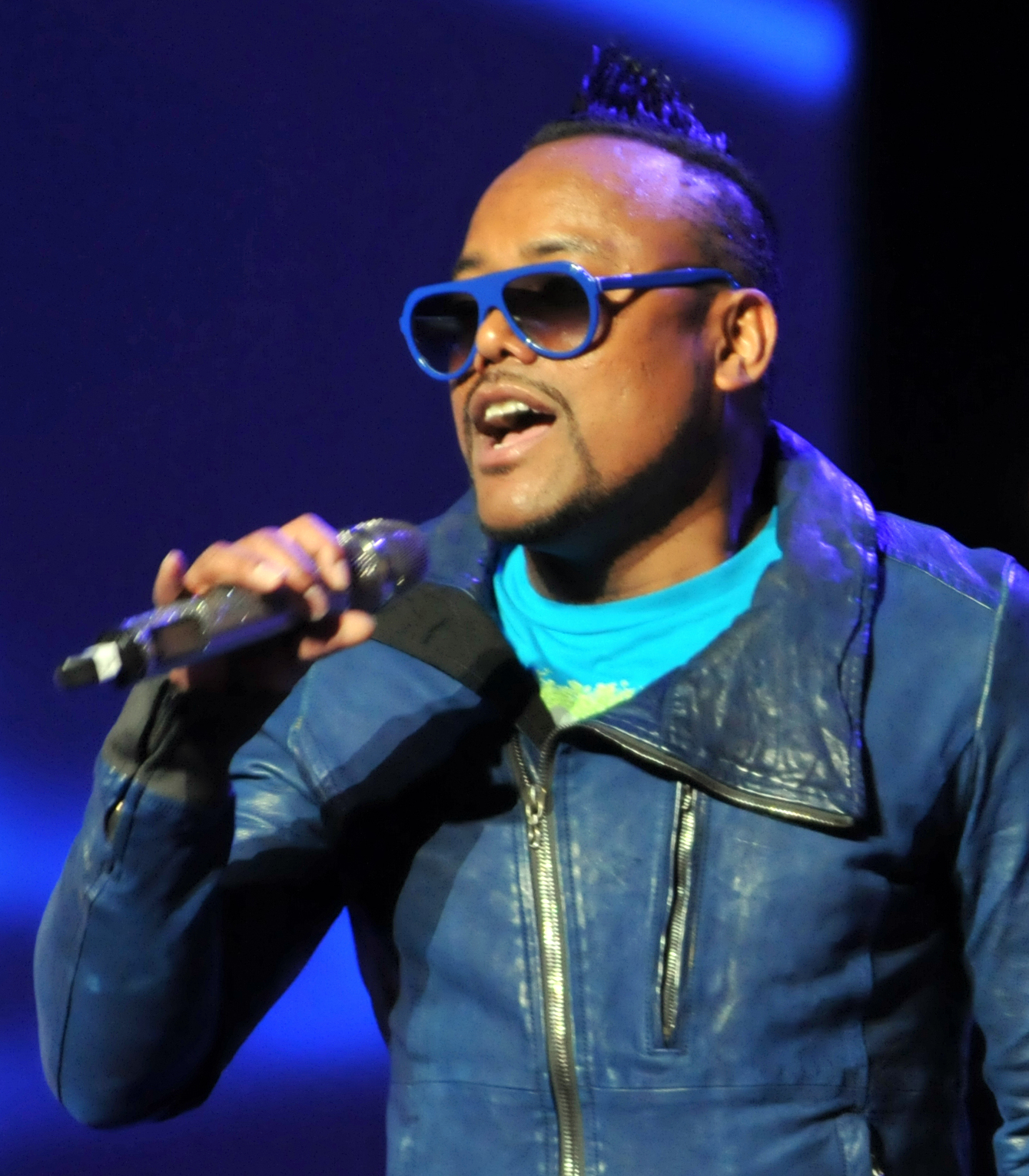
On March 7, 2013, apl.de.ap was confirmed as the last coach of the show. He is dubbed as The voice that ruled the worldwide music chart.

After Salonga's confirmation, there has been strong rumors that the fourth coach will be Allan Pineda who is more popularly known as apl.de.ap. apl.de.ap is a Filipino-American rapper and member of the Grammy Award-winning group The Black Eyed Peas. During an interview made by The Huffington Post in 2012, apl.de.ap stated that he has plans on launching his own talent show in the Philippines. "I've been working myself up to do it because I'm not used to being on TV everyday... I've been offered a show for next year," he revealed.

On March 1, 2013, ABS-CBN has confirmed that they are in the final stages of negotiating with the management of apl.de.ap to become its fourth and last official coach of the show. On March 7, 2013, it was announced through ABS-CBN's entertainment website, Push, that apl.de.ap will sit as the fourth coach. On an article posted in the network's official website dated March 20, 2013, apl.de.ap is slated to do the initial promotional plug with TFC London and is scheduled to arrive in Manila by April to meet and work with the three other coaches and the rest of the show's team. His promotional television plug was aired on March 27, 2013, right after TV Patrol. The plug dubbed him as The voice that ruled the worldwide music chart.

In an interview made by the Philippine Daily Inquirer in April 2013, apl said that he will be truthful on coaching his artists, as well giving them constructive criticisms. apl will also share his life experiences, what he has been through the music industry, and how hard it is to fulfill and reach it.

In an interview made by the Philippine Daily Inquirer in September 2013, apl.de.ap was asked why he accepted his stint as coach in the show. He replied, "My friend, will.i.am, since he was doing it in London, suggested it to me. "You gotta do 'The Voice.'" And I'm like, "Really? I don't know man, I'm not sure.” Because I have to comment on the people and I'm nearsighted, and I was scared that I'm not gonna see their expressions while they were singing. But I came up with the idea—only if they can put a screen at the bottom of my chair so I could see their facial expression, their energy, the way they're singing. That made me comfortable. OK, now I could do it." On asked what he loved about the show, he said, "I've always been into discovering new Filipino artists. I've wanted to give them the same opportunity that I had. I like it because there are no boundaries. Anyone can join "The Voice" as long as they could sing. You can be old, you can be any gender. It doesn't matter. It's all about the voice at the end of the day."

On June 12, 2014, interview by MJ Filipe of ABS-CBN News, apl confirmed that he will return for the second season.

== Hosts ==
The hosts of The Voice of the Philippines

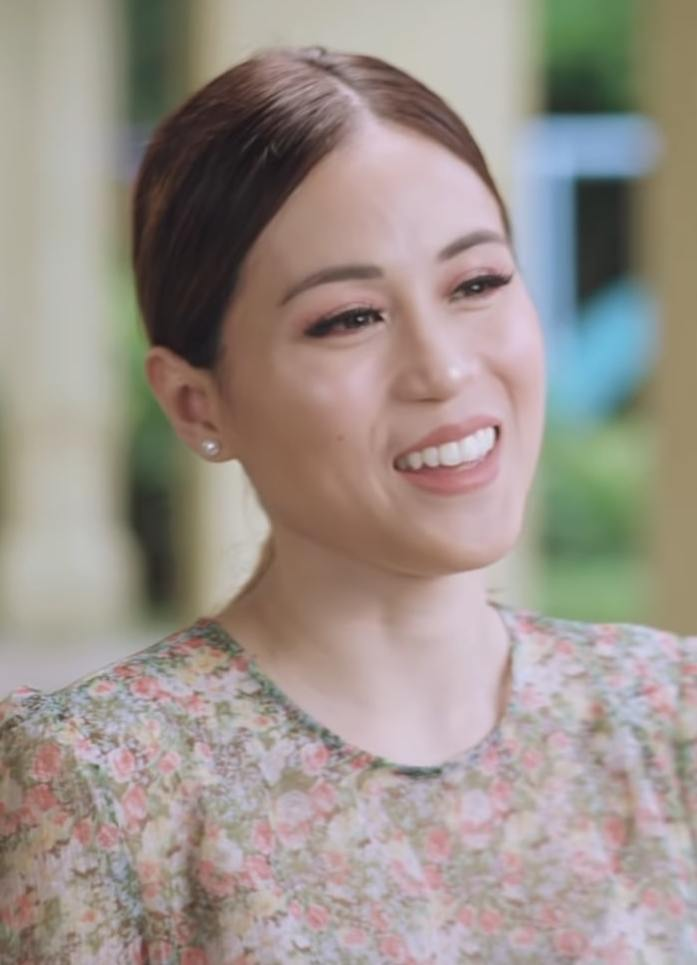
Toni Gonzaga

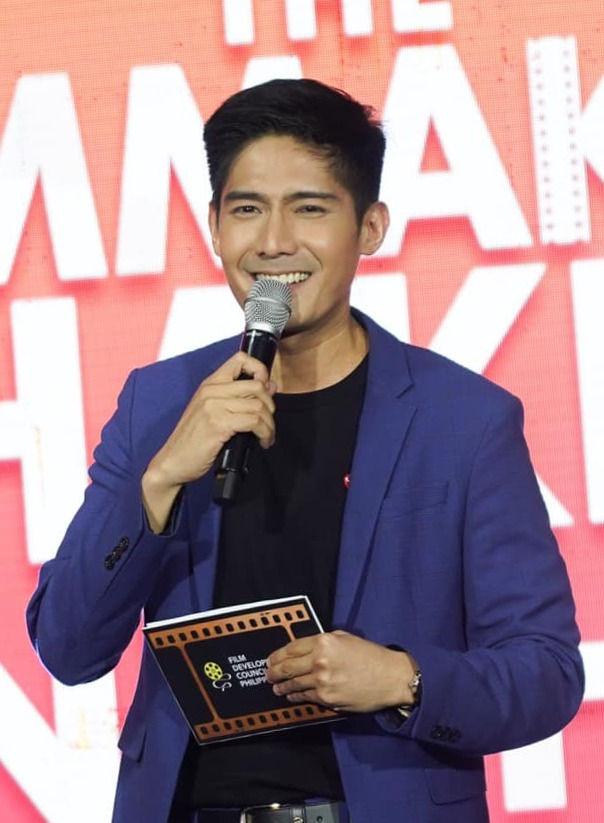
Robi Domingo

The Voice of the Philippines hosts
Host	Seasons	
Host	1	2
Toni Gonzaga		
Luis Manzano		
Robi Domingo		
Alex Gonzaga		

Legend
Featured as a Main Host.
Featured as a Backstage Host.

=== Main hosts ===
Rumors had been circulating that Toni Gonzaga and Robi Domingo, and even Lea Salonga are said to host the show. However, according to the production team, all of these rumors were debunked as there were still no confirmed hosts for the franchise.

On February 8, 2013, after months of speculations, Toni Gonzaga was confirmed to host the franchise. It was announced on Gonzaga's talk show, The Buzz.

Gonzaga said she thinks that the show is good for her, as this will push her to become a better singer. "This will inspire me to improve and develop myself when it comes to the singing department. Of course I will learn a lot from the coaches, from the singers and this will help me also hone my skills," she said. On asked what made the show different from the other shows, she said, "This one has no theme. I think one of the best asset of this program is that we will not mold the singers, we will not mold them into something or someone that is not their personality. We will showcase their talent and their abilities according to what they can do and what they can give. They can choose their songs, they can choose their outfits. Everything will be based on their own choice. That will be good because as you see in the other reality shows they mold the singers that sometimes make them uncomfortable. That is why in this show, we chose where they are comfortable and where they think they can shine."

On November 6, 2013, Toni Gonzaga was confirmed to return as the main host of the second season. On September 5, 2014, Luis Manzano announced that he will be joining Gonzaga as one of the host of the show. Prior to the second season, Manzano previously hosted the first season of The Voice Kids.

=== Social media correspondents ===
Gonzaga confirmed that she will be joined by Robi Domingo as the show's media correspondent. Incidentally, this marks Gonzaga and Domingo's third time to work together after Pinoy Big Brother: Unlimited and Pinoy Big Brother: Teen Edition 4 which were also under the unit of Director Lauren Dyogi (coincidentally, Domingo was once part as a housemate of the second season of Pinoy Big Brother: Teen Edition (known as "Plus"), which him was proclaimed as a "runner-up" or "second big placer" behind Ejay Falcon on the season's finale night.)

On April 16, 2013, Alex Gonzaga, the younger sister of Toni Gonzaga, was revealed to join the show, teaming up with Robi Domingo as V-Reporters or as the show's social media correspondents.

On April 15, 2014, Domingo confirmed that he will return in the second season along with Gonzaga.

== Others ==
=== Companion show ===
After the Battles during the first season, a special companion show was brought up by the production team. It featured the life stories of the artists and some special numbers performed by them. The companion show only ran for four episodes.

=== Spin-offs ===
==== The Voice Kids ====
On November 18, 2013, Lauren Dyogi, The Voice of the Philippines' business unit head, announced on Twitter that there will be a kids version of the show. The first open call auditions was held on November 23, 2013, at Metro Gaisano Pacific Mall in Mandaue, Cebu and was open to kids aged 8 to 14 years old. It was followed by an audition held on December 1, 2013, at the Newport Mall in Resorts World Manila. In 2014, auditions for the Visayas, Mindanao, and Metro Manila were held on January 11, 18 and 25 respectively. A separate audition for Luzon was held on February 1.

The show aired on May 24, 2014. The coaches of the show is composed of Lea Salonga, Bamboo Mañalac, and Sarah Geronimo, and is hosted by Luis Manzano, together with Alex Gonzaga. It is the third national franchise in the Southeast Asian region after Thailand and Vietnam. Nine-year-old Lyca Gairanod of Cavite became the first The Voice Kids grand champion after leading the public's votes on July 27, 2014.

The second season began airing on June 6, 2015. All the coaches returned to reprise their duties. Luis Manzano also returned as host, accompanied by Robi Domingo and Yeng Constantino as the show's backstage and media hosts. The show ended on August 30, 2015, with Elha Nympha of Team Bamboo declared as the winner.

The third season aired on May 28, 2016. Lea Salonga and Bamboo Mañalac returned. On April 4, 2016, Sarah Geronimo confirmed that she will not be returning as a coach for the third season. On May 2, 2016, it is confirmed that Sharon Cuneta will be the new coach for the season. Luis Manzano also returned as host, accompanied by Robi Domingo as the show's backstage and media hosts. Kim Chiu replaces Yeng Constantino. The show ended on August 28, 2016, with Joshua Oliveros of Team Lea as the winner.

The fourth season aired on August 3, 2019. The show ended with Vanjoss Bayaban of Team Sarah as the winner.

The fifth season aired in February 25, 2023. It included debuting coaches Martin Nivera and KZ Tandingan; replacing former coaches Lea Salonga and Sarah Geronimo. The season ended with Shane Bernabe of Team Bamboo as the winner.

The sixth season premiered on September 15, 2024 in GMA Network. It is hosted by Dingdong Dantes, with Billy Crawford, Julie Anne San Jose, and Stell of SB19 returning as coaches from The Voice Generations; newcomer Pablo, also from SB19, joined as a new coach. The season ended on December 15, 2024, with Nevin Adam Garceniego of Tropa ni Pablo as the winner.

==== The Voice Teens ====
A new version for the teens began airing on April 16, 2017; this is the second teen version in the world and the first in Asia. Auditions are open for teens who are 13 to 17 years old to fill in the gap between the adult and kids version. Just like the adults version, there are four coaches. It was revealed that Salonga, Mañalac and Cuneta will reprise their roles as coaches for the Teen version. On February 28, 2017, it was confirmed that Sarah Geronimo will be returning as coach, completing the panel of coaches.

The first season ended with Jona Marie Soquite of Team Sarah as the winner.

==== The Voice Generations ====
On January 7, 2023, GMA Network unveiled its program lineup for 2023, which included a generations version of the show. The spin-off, which would be the first to be produced outside ABS-CBN, was the fifth adaptation of the format, and the first in Asia. Similarly to the adults version, there are four coaches in the show, however, none of the coaches would reprise their roles for the spin-off. On June 9, 2023, it was revealed that Billy Crawford, Julie Anne San Jose, Chito Miranda, and SB19's Stell will comprise the coaching panel. This is the first season among the Philippine seasons to have three male coaches, and the second to have only one female coach.

== Teams ==
Contestant placing

- Winner
- Runner-up
- Third place
- Fourth place

Winners are in bold, the finalists in the finale are in small italic font, and the eliminated artists are in small font.

Season	Coaches and their finalists			
1	apl.de.ap	Lea Salonga	Sarah Geronimo	Bamboo Mañalac
1	Janice Javier; Thor; Jessica Reynoso; Penelope Matanguihan; Stan Perfecto; Cora dela Cruz	**Mitoy Yonting**; Radha; Kimpoy Mainit; Darryl Shy; Diday Garcellano; RJ dela Fuente	Klarisse de Guzman; Morissette; Eva delos Santos; Maki Ricafort; Yuki Ito; Junji Arias	Myk Perez; Paolo Onesa; Isabella Fabregas; Lee Grane; Angelique Alcantara; Talia Reyes
2	Alisah Bonaobra; Daryl Ong; Mackie Cao; Suy Galvez; Bradley Holmes; Ferns Tosco	Leah Patricio; Timmy Pavino; Nino Alejandro; Miro Valera; Casper Blancaflor; Abbey Pineda	**Jason Dy**; Monique Lualhati; Kokoi Baldo; Jason Fernandez; Douglas Dagal; Poppert Bernadas	Rence Rapanot; Rita Martinez; Tanya Diaz; Kai Honasan; Arnee Hidalgo; Karlo Mojica

== Coach's advisors ==
In the show, several people will aid the coaches in guiding their respective teams. These people will help each of the team's assigned to them to prepare for the Battles and during the Live shows.

Season	Coaches and their advisers				Sources
1	apl.de.ap	Lea Salonga	Sarah Geronimo	Bamboo Mañalac	
1	Arnel Pineda	Gerard Salonga	Gary Valenciano	Joey Ayala	
2	None				

== Reception ==
=== Critical reception ===
During the pilot episode, the show received fairly negative reviews from the viewers emphasizing the design of the infamous red chairs, and set. The show was also observed having longer commercial loads ending up to a huge gaps per show. The coaches' opening performance was also deemed unrehearsed. Pooled reviews from novices of the franchise stated that the coaches were found to be a bit exaggerated on television. Avid fanatics of the franchise however explained that certain aspects of the said coaches can also be seen across franchises. Ms. Lea Salonga together with her fellow coaches were even bashed on Twitter. On an article written by Joey Aquino of The People's Journal on June 21, 2013, Aquino commented that Salonga has already gave much prestige to the country and with the bashing that had happened on Twitter, Salonga deserves much respect that she is entitled to.

Aside from the pilot week reviews and criticisms, the show has also been criticized for Bamboo Mañalac's controversial decisions. Mañalac received many negative comments after the season one's first episode of the Battles aired last July 28, 2013, after he made a controversial choice on picking Lee Grane Maranan over Dan Billano. The two performed the ballad song "One" by U2, wherein Maranan was vocally outperformed by Billano. Billano was even praised by Joey Ayala, Mañalac's guest adviser during the Battles, and that according to him Billano was the clear winner of that Team Bamboo's first vocal battle. Billano was also praised by apl.de.ap; while Maranan was praised by Lea Salonga for her emotional delivery of the song. Mañalac's choice of letting Maranan win over Billano was based on the former's soulfulness and emotions rather than basing the result on the two's vocal performances, which caused rave of negative comments from the netizens. It is noted that Maranan was a crowd favorite during her Blind auditions. Maranan undeniably admitted her loss over Billano but he thanked her coach for picking her and later added a promise that she will do better in the next round of the competition.

=== Television ratings ===
Television ratings for The Voice of the Philippines on ABS-CBN are gathered from two major sources, namely from AGB Nielsen and Kantar Media. AGB Nielsen's survey ratings are gathered from Mega Manila households, while Kantar Media's survey ratings are gathered from all over the Philippines' urban and rural households.

Season	Number of Episodes	Premiere	Rating	Rank		Finale	Rating (Saturday)	Rank		Rating (Sunday)	Rank		Media	Ref.
Season	Number of Episodes	Premiere	Rating	Timeslot	Primetime	Finale	Rating (Saturday)	Timeslot	Primetime	Rating (Sunday)	Timeslot	Primetime	Media	Ref.
1	32	June 15, 2013	27.8%	#1	#1	September 29, 2013	22.8%	#2	#6	27.7%	#1	#2	AGB Nielsen	
1	32	June 15, 2013	30.5%	#1	#2	September 29, 2013	24.3%	#1	#4	30.3%	#1	#1	Kantar Media	
2	36	October 26, 2014	22.4%	#2	#2	March 1, 2015	21.3%	#2	#2	23.0%	#2	#2	AGB Nielsen	
2	36	October 26, 2014	28.3%	#1	#1	March 1, 2015	28.0%	#1	#2	30.8%	#1	#1	Kantar Media	

From the accumulated data report gathered by Kantar Media in January to December 2014, the second season of the franchise was the sixth-most watched television program in the entire year with an average television viewership rating of 27.5%. Also basing from the data gathered by Kantar Media, the show was the sixth-most watched show in February 2015, garnering an average viewership of 24.4%.

=== Awards ===
Since the show's inception, it had received numerous nominations and awards from different award-giving bodies.

Year	Awards	Nominated	Result	Ref.
2015	6th Golden Screen Awards by Entertainment Press Society Inc.	The Voice of the Philippines for Outstanding Adapted Reality/Competition Program	Nominated	
2015	13th Gawad Tanglaw by Gawad Tanglaw	The Voice of the Philippines (season 2) for Best Reality/Talent Show	Won	
2014	2014 Asian Television Awards by Television Asia Plus magazine	The Voice of the Philippines for Best Adaptation of an Existing Format	Nominated	
2014	28th Star Awards for Television by Philippine Movie Press Club	Toni Gonzaga, Alex Gonzaga, Robi Domingo for Best Talent Search Program Host	Nominated	
2014	10th USTv Students’ Choice Awards by University of Santo Tomas	The Voice of the Philippines for Students’ Choice of Reality/Game Show	Won	
2014	10th USTv Students’ Choice Awards by University of Santo Tomas	Toni Gonzaga for Students’ Choice of Reality/Game Show Host	Won	
2014	45th GMMSF Box-Office Entertainment Awards by Guillermo Mendoza Memorial Scholarship Foundation	The Voice of the Philippines for Top Reality Talk/Talent Search/Game Show	Won	
2013	27th Star Awards for Television by Philippine Movie Press Club	Toni Gonzaga, Alex Gonzaga, Robi Domingo for Best Talent Search Program Host	Won	

== Discography ==
Since the show's inception, its artists have released several albums and singles under MCA Music and by Star Records.

== See also ==
- List of programs broadcast by ABS-CBN
