= Sarah G. Live =

2012–13 Philippine television musical variety show

- Title card
- Genre: Musical, variety show
- Written by: Isa Reyes; Jomar Baptista; Gerrome Esguerra
- Directed by: Erick C. Salud
- Presented by: Sarah Geronimo; Luis Manzano
- Theme music composer: Louie Ocampo
- Country of origin: Philippines
- Original language: Filipino
- No. of seasons: 2
- No. of episodes: 51

Production
- Executive producer: Marvi Manikan-Gelito
- Producer: Marcus Alacon
- Editors: Michael Abarintos; Ariel Diaz
- Running time: 1 hour
- Production company: ABS-CBN Studios

Original release
- Network: ABS-CBN
- Release: February 26, 2012 – February 10, 2013

Sarah G Live! is a Philippine television variety show broadcast by ABS-CBN. Hosted by Sarah Geronimo. It aired from February 26, 2012 to February 10, 2013, replacing Junior MasterChef Pinoy Edition and was replaced by the fourth season of Pilipinas Got Talent. It features different segments showcasing Geronimo's singing and dancing capabilities.

== Format ==
The show usually starts with an opening song and dance number by Geronimo together with G-Force. The opening act features different songs from Beyoncé, Katy Perry, Rihanna, Britney Spears, Christina Aguilera, etc. It also airs different segments like Sige Go!, Sarah Loves You, Swag, Sine Gang and Smash-up. On her final song, Geronimo frequently states her message for the viewers and sings her statement song.

== Hosts ==
=== Main host ===
- Sarah Geronimo

=== Co-host ===
- Luis Manzano

== Award ==
- 21st KBP Golden Dove Awards 2013's Best Variety Program.

== See also ==
- List of programs broadcast by ABS-CBN
- The Sharon Cuneta Show
