= 22nd Awit Awards =

2009 Philippine music awards ceremony

- Date: December 7, 2009
- Location: Filoil Flying V Arena, Corazon de Jesus, San Juan
- Hosted by: Eugene Domingo; Piolo Pascual

Highlights
- Most awards: Itchyworms (4)
- Most nominations: Gary Valenciano (13)
- Album of the Year: Eraserheads: The Reunion Concert 08.30.08 by Eraserheads
- Song of the Year: "Yugto" by Rico Blanco

Television/radio coverage
- Network: Ustream (online only)
- Produced by: Bellhaus Entertainment

The 22nd Awit Awards were held on December 7, 2009 at the Filoil Flying V Arena, San Juan. They honored the achievements in the Philippine music industry for the year 2008.

Gary Valenciano led the nominations with thirteen. Rico Blanco and Jonathan Manalo followed with eight. They were followed by Bamboo and Itchyworms with six nods.

The awards show was broadcast live through Ustream, an online video streaming service. Itchyworms won most of the awards with four. A two-hour concert was held right after the awards ceremony.

== Winners and nominees ==
Winners are listed first and highlighted in bold. Nominated producers, composers and lyricists are not included in this list, unless noted.

=== Performance Awards ===
Best Performance by a Female Recording Artist	Best Performance by a Male Recording Artist
**"Open Arms" – Aiza Seguerra**; "Gotta Go My Own Way" – Nikki Gil; "Love Will Lead You Back" – Nina; "And I Am Telling You (I’m Not Going)" – Charice Pempengco; "And I Love You So" – Regine Velasquez	**"Yugto" – Rico Blanco**; "Paano na Kaya" – Bugoy Drilon; "Wag Mo na Sanang Isipin" – Richard Poon; "Mabuti pa Sila" – Rico J. Puno; "When I Hear You Call" – Gary Valenciano
Best Performance by a Group Recording Artists	Best Performance by a New Female Recording Artist
**"Penge Naman Ako Nyan" – Itchyworms**; "Kailan" – Bamboo; "K.I.T.T.Y." – Kitty Girls; "Sana" – Kenyo; "Laughter All the Time" – South Border	**"Childhood" – Raki Vega**; "Imposible" – KC Concepcion; "Mahal Kita" – Maricris Garcia; "Kung Iniibig Ka Niya" – Laarni Lozada; "And I Am Telling You (I’m Not Going)" – Charice Pempengco
Best Performance by a New Male Recording Artist	Best Performance by a New Group Recording Artists
**"Summer Wind" – Charlie Green**; "Lawlaw" – DJ Sundalong Bata; "Paano na Kaya" – Bugoy Drilon; "Ikaw Lang ang Iibigin" – David Idol; "Suko Na" – Zacariah	**"Di Nakikita" – Roots of Nature**; "Kaiisip" – Check; "K.I.T.T.Y" – Kitty Girls; "Sulyap" – Manibela; "Tabi" – Paraluman
Best Performance by a Child/Children Recording Artist/s	Best Collaboration
**"Summer Wind" – Charlie Green**	**"Letting Go" – Gary Valenciano and Powerplay feat. Mon Faustino,** **Mon Espia, May Ann Casal-Soriano & Ma. Melissa Alsisto**; "Captured" – Christian Bautista feat. Sitti; "Back in Time" – Kyla & Jay-R; "Ang Sarap Dito" – Project 1; "Baby, It's Cold Outside" – Sitti feat. Christian Bautista

=== Creativity Awards ===
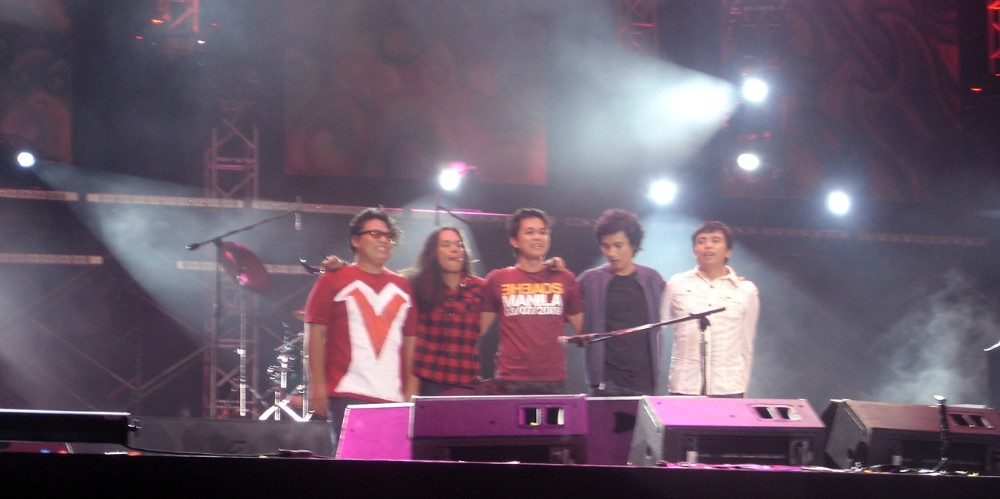
Eraserheads, Album of the Year winner

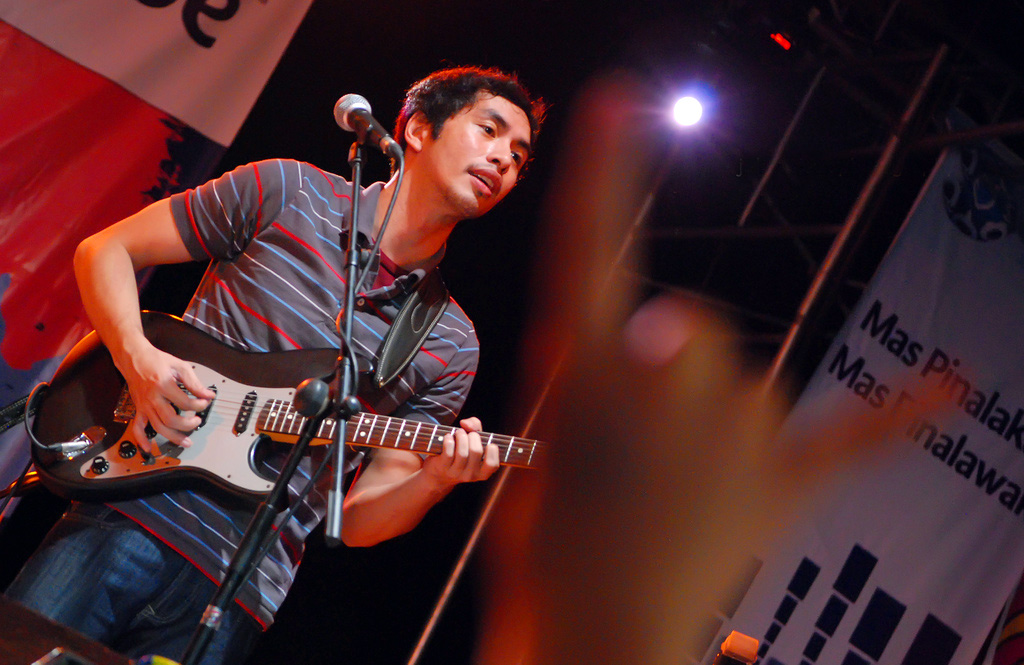
Rico Blanco, Song of the Year and Best Male winner

Album of the Year	Song of the Year
**Eraserheads: The Reunion Concert 08.30.08 – Eraserheads**; The Great Filipino Song Book – Ogie Alcasid; Tomorrow Becomes Yesterday – Bamboo; A.k.a Cassandra – KC Concepcion; Journey – Yeng Constantino	**"Yugto"** **Rico Blanco (composer & lyricist)**; "Betamax" Raimund Marasigan, Mike Dizon & Myrene Academia (composers & lyricists); "Kailan" Nathan Azarcon, Ira Cruz, Bamboo Mañalac & Vic Mercado (composers & lyricists); "Paano na Kaya " Ryan Cayabyab (composer & lyricist); "Penge Naman Ako Nyan" Jazz Nicolas (composer) Jugs Jugueta (lyricist)
Best Selling Album of the Year	Best Ballad Recording
**Charice – Charice Pempengco**	**"When I Hear You Call" – Gary Valenciano**; "Your Universe" – Rico Blanco; "Paano na Kaya" – Bugoy Drilon; "Ikaw ang Pangarap" – Martin Nievera; "Softly Saying Sorry" – Ariel Rivera
Best Rock/Alternative Recording	Best World/Bossa/Reggae/Latin Music
**"Penge Naman Ako Nyan" – Itchyworms**; "Kailan" – Bamboo; "Ang Pusa Mo" – Pedicab; "FX" – Pedicab; "Procrastinator" – Sandwich	**"Usahay" – Evelyn Juteau**; "Boracay (Alaala Mo)" – Evelyn Juteau & Mon David; "Could You Be Messiah" – Kuh Ledesma; "Di Nakikita" – Roots of Nature; "Ngayong Pasko" – Sitti
Best Novelty Recording	Best Dance Recording
**"Mabuti pa Sila" – Rico J. Puno**; "Gikumot-kumot" – Kantin Dudg; "Ayos na ang Buto-buto" – Vhong Navarro; "Giling-giling" – Willie Revillame; "Sabay Sabay Tayo" – Marian Rivera	**"Freak-out, Baby" – Itchyworms**; "Breathe" – KC Concepcion; "Jump Around" – Amber Davis; "Kiri Kiri" – Dos Fuertes; "Shout For Joy (Gabriel Mix)" – Gary Valenciano
Best Inspirational/Religious Recording	Best Christmas Recording
**"Never Give Up" – Erik Santos & Christian Bautista**; "I Believe" – Christian Bautista; "Ngiti Lang" – KC Concepcion; "Won’t Be Lost" – Angie Padua & Lay Howell; "When I Hear You Call" – Gary Valenciano	**"Wish List" – MYMP**; "Pasko na Sinta Ko" – Martin Nievera; "Pasko na Sinta Ko" – Sheryn Regis; "Ngayong Pasko" – Sitti; "Pasko Natin ‘To" – The Bloomfields
Best Rap Recording	Best Jazz Recording
**"Wawasakin" – D-Coy**; "Palakpakan Everyone" – Beware	**"Mama Said So" – Charlie Green**; "‘Wag Mo na Sanang Isipin" – Richard Poon; "Laughter All the Time" – South Border; "Nubian Princess" – Aya Yuson
Best R&B Recording	Best Regional Recording
**"Paano" – Rachelle Ann Go**; "You Make Me Feel" – Kyla; "Laughter All the Time" – South Border; "Suko Na" – Zacariah	**"Sarung Banggi" (in Bicolano) – Alibata**; **"Gikumot-kumot" (in Cebuano) – Kantin Dudg**
Best Song Written for Movie/TV/Stage Play
**"Ikaw ang Pangarap" (from Lobo) – Martin Nievera**; "Ngayon, Bukas at Kailanman" (from Baler) – Sarah Geronimo; "Asero" (from Codename: Asero) – Janno Gibbs; "Buksan ang 'Yong Puso" (from The Legend) – Jolina Magdangal; "Lipad" (from Dayo: Sa Mundo ng Elementalia) – Lea Salonga with FILharmoniKA; "Ang Aking Mundo" (from Dyesebel) – SugarPop

=== Technical Achievement Awards ===
Best Musical Arrangement	Best Vocal Arrangement
**"Yugto" – Rico Blanco**; "Last Days on a Cruise Ship" – Bamboo; "Laughter All the Time " – Jay Durias; "When I Hear You Call" – Gary Valenciano; "Ribbon in the Sky" – Bobby Velasco	**"Letting Go" – Mon Faustino**; "Take Me out of the Dark " – Mon Faustino; "Nahuli Mo na Ba Ako?" – Itchyworms; "Paano" – Jonathan Manalo; "Ribbon in the Sky" – Arnie Mendaros
Best Engineered Recording	Best Album Package
**"Yugto" – Angee Rozul**; "OHHH" – Jerry Joanino & Don Manalang; "When I Hear You Call" – Jerry Joanino & Don Manalang; "Last Days on a Cruise Ship" – Angee Rozul; "Muli" – Angee Rozul	**S Marks the Spot** **Inksurge (graphic design & album concept)** **Dan Gil (photography)**; Fisheye John Ed de Vera (graphic design, album concept & photography); Low Key Jay Lumboy (graphic design & album concept) Mark Nicdao (photography); Rebirth Ethos Creative Solutions (graphic design & album concept) Jun de Leon (photography)
Music Video of the Year
**"Procrastinator" – Sandwich** **Quark Henares (director)**; "Yugto" (Southeast Asia version) – Rico Blanco Quark Henares (director); "Baroque" – My Odessa Avid Liongoren (director); "Message in a Bottle" – The Dawn Mike Sandejas (director); "When I Hear You Call" – Gary Valenciano Luis Tabuena (director)

=== People's Choice Awards ===
Best Performance by a Female Recording Artist	Best Performance by a Male Recording Artist
**"And I Love You So" – Regine Velasquez**; "Open Arms" – Aiza Seguerra; "Gotta Go My Own Way" – Nikki Gil; "Love Will Lead You Back" – Nina; "And I Am Telling You (I’m Not Going)" – Charice Pempengco	**"Paano na Kaya" – Bugoy Drilon**; "Yugto" – Rico Blanco; "Wag Mo na Sanang Isipin" – Richard Poon; "Mabuti pa Sila" – Rico J. Puno; "When I Hear You Call" – Gary Valenciano
Best Performance by a Group Recording Artists	Best Performance by a New Female Recording Artist
**"Penge Naman Ako Nyan" – Itchyworms**; "Kailan" – Bamboo; "K.I.T.T.Y." – Kitty Girls; "Sana" – Kenyo; "Laughter All the Time" – South Border	**"Kung Iniibig Ka Niya" – Laarni Lozada**; "Childhood" – Raki Vega; "Imposible" – KC Concepcion; "Mahal Kita" – Maricris Garcia; "And I Am Telling You (I’m Not Going)" – Charice Pempengco
Best Performance by a New Male Recording Artist	Best Performance by a New Group Recording Artists
**"Suko Na" – Zacariah**; "Summer Wind" – Charlie Green; "Lawlaw" – DJ Sundalong Bata; "Paano na Kaya" – Bugoy Drilon; "Ikaw Lang ang Iibigin" – David Idol	**"Tabi" – Paraluman**; "Di Nakikita" – Roots of Nature; "Kaiisip" – Check; "K.I.T.T.Y" – Kitty Girls; "Sulyap" – Manibela
Song of the Year	Music Video of the Year
**"Paano na Kaya "** **Ryan Cayabyab (composer & lyricist)**; "Yugto" Rico Blanco (composer & lyricist); "Betamax" Raimund Marasigan, Mike Dizon & Myrene Academia (composers & lyricists); "Kailan" Nathan Azarcon, Ira Cruz, Bamboo Mañalac & Vic Mercado (composers & lyricists); "Penge Naman Ako Nyan" Jazz Nicolas (composer) Jugs Jugueta (lyricist)	**"Baroque" – My Odessa** **Avid Liongoren (director)**; "Procrastinator" – Sandwich Quark Henares (director); "Yugto" (Southeast Asia version) – Rico Blanco Quark Henares (director); "Message in a Bottle" – The Dawn Mike Sandejas (director); "When I Hear You Call" – Gary Valenciano Luis Tabuena (director)
Favorite Female Recording Artist	Favorite Male Recording Artist
**Sheryn Regis**	**Zacariah**
Favorite Group Recording Artists
**La Diva**

=== Special Award ===
Dangal ng Musikang Pilipino Award
- **Hotdog**
