= Buklod =

Filipino folk rock band

Buklod was a Filipino folk rock band formed in the 1980s based in Metro Manila. Many of their songs were about social issues, including the environment and human rights.Some of their popular songs include "Tatsulok," "Kanlungan," and "Oyayi sa Mundo."

The band disbanded in 1994, but Noel Cabangon continued his solo career and remains active in the music industry.

== History ==
Borne out of the anti-Marcos struggle, Buklod was founded by Noel Cabangon, Rom Dongeto, and Rene Boncocan. Their name, "Bukluran ng Musikero para sa Bayan," translates to "Solidarity of Musicians for the Nation."

Buklod disbanded 1994 due to a combination of personal reasons and growing political differences among its members. Some of their songs like "Tatsulok" is now revived by Bamboo, and "Kanlungan" remains a popular Filipino song. Each member went on to successful solo careers, with Cabangon being the most prominent.

In 2018, the group reunited after more than two decades to create music that reflects current social and political issues in the Philippines. Original members Noel Cabangon, Romeo Dongeto, and Rene Boncocan returned to record 3 Dekada: Ang Muling Pag-awit, celebrating 30 years since their debut.

== Discography ==
- Bukid At Buhay (1988)
1. Kasaysayan
2. Buhay At Bukid
3. Nasa Atin Ang Panahon
4. Sag-od / Lupao
5. Magsasaka, Ikaw Ay Bayani
6. Awit Ng Magsasaka
7. Lupang Mutya
8. Sakada
9. Buksan Ang Iyong Puso
10. Buhay Ay Di Singganda Ng Pangarap
- Tatsulok (1991)
1. Tatsulok (featured the popular song later covered by Bamboo)
2. Hindi Ko Kailangan
3. Tumindig Ka
4. Buhay Ko
5. Muro Ami
6. Awit Para Sa Mga Bata
7. Lea
8. Ang Ating Awit
- Sa Kandungan ng Kalikasan
1. Oyayi Sa Mundo
2. Kanlungan
3. Wastea And Gone
4. Maynila
5. Usok
6. Inang Lawa
7. Kawalan Ng Pag-Asa
8. Para Kay Andre
9. Sierra Madre
10. Hanggang Kailan
11. Isang Awit, Isang Mundo
12. Sa Kandungan Ng Kalikasan
- Tatlong Dekada: Buklod, Ang Muling Pag-Awit
