= Introvoys =

Filipino pop rock band

INTRoVOYS
- Origin: Manila, Philippines
- Genres: Alternative rock; OPM; pop rock; new wave (early work)
- Years active: 1986–present
- Labels: Dyna Records; 2Heaven Muzik
- Members: Paco Arespacochaga; Jonathan Buencamino; JJ Buencamino; Vic Carpio
- Past members: 3rd-G Cristobal; Ira Cruz; Jobert Buencamino; Paku Herrera; Toto Villanueva; Henry Abesamis; Steve Guadiz; Chot Ulep; Tim De Ramos; Gary Padre; Art Pangilinan; G3 Misa; Jonathan Dela Paz; Jonathan Manuel
- Website: http://introvoys.com

INTRoVOYS is a Filipino pop rock band formed in 1986 by 3rd-G Cristobal, Paco Arespacochaga and Jonathan Buencamino. The band is now based in Los Angeles, California. They released their debut album, Back to the Roots in 1990, and their second album, Breaking New Grounds (1992), achieved quadruple platinum status.

== History ==
=== 1986–1988: Formation and early years ===
INTRoVOYS was formed in Manila, Philippines in 1986 by 3rd-G Cristobal, Paco Arespacochaga, Jonathan Buencamino. 3rd-G and Paco were classmates in high school, but have known each other since elementary. The first incarnation of INTRoVOYS had Jonathan Buencamino, Paco Arespacochaga and 3rd-G Cristobal in a small rehearsal space on the corner of Katipunan and Santolan in Quezon City, Philippines. During their first rehearsal, 3rd-G taught Paco how to play the drums. Later, they added Jonathan Buencamino's younger brother Jj to play keyboards, Ira Cruz, lead guitars, and Jobert Buencamino for bass guitar.

=== 1989–1991: Back to the Roots ===
In 1989, the band contributed two original songs, "Just A Dream" and "Lullaby", to the compilation Ten of Another Kind, which showcased 10 tracks from five emerging acts in the Philippines' alternative music scene. Due to other priorities, 3rd-G had to give up his position as the band's rhythm guitar player. The band released their debut album, Back to the Roots in 1990. Their first two singles received a lukewarm response and the band's label, Dyna Records, was ready to drop them. In spite of this, their third single "However Which Way", went to No. 1 in Metro Manila in just two weeks. It became the No. 1 song in the country after a month, paving the way for a national tour. "Lullaby", the final track from Ten of Another Kind, would also be included in their debut album, and re-released as one of its follow-up singles.. Ira Cruz left the band in 1991.

=== 1991–1994: Breaking New Grounds and Line To Heaven ===
When Cruz left INTRoVOYS, Vic Carpio replaced him as their new guitarist. The band's second album, Breaking New Grounds, was released in 1992. Included in this album were the hits Will I Survive, Di Na Ako Aasa Pa, Stay and Are You Happy. The album achieved quadruple platinum status, earning INTRoVOYS the tag "The No. 1 Band in the Land".. In 1993, the band released their third album, Line to Heaven, wherein the carrier single was written after Arespacochaga suffered the tragic loss of his parents. This album also included another hit song, "Kailanman".

=== 1994–1999: Greatest Hits...Live, One and Eroplano ===
Jobert Buencamino left the band in 1994 for health and personal reasons. The band invited Paku Herrera of Neocolours to take on Jobert's chores. They released their first greatest hits concert Greatest Hits...Live followed by their carrier single Living My Life in 1995. The band's fourth album One released in 1996, included hits Tell Me Why, More Than A Friend and Magkaisa Tayong Lahat. This was Arespacochaga's last album and he left the band in 1996 and was replaced by Toto Villanueva as the new drummer. They released their fifth album Eroplano features the hits "Fool", "My Child", "Eroplano", "The Big Ride" and a cover of Mr. Rey Valera's hit Kung Kailangan Mo Ako. A year later, Jonathan Buencamino was forced to leave due to an illness that caused him to lose his voice indefinitely.

=== 2000–2004: Short-Lived Reunion and Hiatus ===
In 2000, Paco Arespacochaga went solo and released his album called Rebirth, featuring three popular songs of his former band and a collaboration with his former wife Geneva Cruz. Paco Arespacochaga rejoined the band in 2000. Ira Cruz, who had played with INTRoVOYS from 1988 to 1991, rejoined with the original line-up members. Paco, Jonathan, Jj & Jobert Buencamino and Vic Carpio for the short-lived reunion run in 2001 and after that, he decided to pursue other interests. He joined Passage and Co-founded the Band Kapatid. Vic Carpio and Jobert Buencamino decided to retire and pursue other interests and the other members decided to go on an indefinite hiatus.

=== 2005–2013: A Brighter Day and New Beginnings ===
After years of hiatus, Arespacochaga, Jonathan & Jj Buencamino decided to get back together and work on a new album with their two new members, Henry Abesamis on bass guitar and Jonathan Manuel on guitars. In 2005, they released a single "Desire" which can be downloaded from their mailing list. and the band released their album entitled A Brighter Day, marks a beginning of a new chapter for the band. The landmark album, released 7 years after their last album, Eroplano, marks the exodus of the band from the Philippines to the United States.

In December 2006, the band released their first studio Greatest Hits album entitled, New Beginnings, a collection of re-arranged 18 major hits and introduced two new members, Steve Guadiz on guitar and Chot Ulep on bass.

In April 2009, Tim De Ramos joined the band as the new drummer while Arespacochaga assumed duties as the new lead guitarist, Steve Guadiz left INTRoVOYS followed by Chot Ulep. In September of that same year, G3 Misa, formerly with Shanghaied and Mystery became the new guitarist and Gary Padre became the new bassist.

In October 2011, at the Tanduay Rockfest, Arespachochaga performed signature INTRoVOYS hits including Line To Heaven and Di Na Ako Aasa Pa. Buoyed by the warm welcome he got from the crowd, he stated, "Salamat. Maraming, maraming salamat. By next year, kasama ko na ang buong banda" ("Thank you. Thank you very much. By next year, the rest of the band will be with me.") In June 2012, Jonathan Dela Paz became the new bassist for the band. In May 2013, Jj Buencamino decided to retire and Art Pangilinan became their new keyboardist.

=== 2014–present: New Single and Where We Left Off ===
In July 2014, INTRoVOYS released their single "Nasaan Ka" and launched a music video filmed in Los Angeles, CA. In August 2014, the band's drummer Arespacochaga was featured on Tunay Na Buhay on GMA 7. In September 2014, INTRoVOYS performed in "Mga Bokalista ng Dekadang Nubenta" US Tour along Jett Pangan, Gary Ignacio, Cooky Chua, and Wency Cornejo.

In May 2015, keyboardist Art Pangilinan left INTRoVOYS, they continue touring as a four piece. In the end of 2015, Jj Buencamino – INTRoVOYS’ original keyboard player re-joined the band. In January 2016, INTRoVOYS released their latest album, "Where We Left Off". It is currently available for download on their website, www.introvoys.com/store. This year, G3 Misa left and INTRoVOYS’ guitar player Vic Carpio returns. In May 2018, bassist JD dela Paz announced his hiatus with the band.

== INTRoVOYS line-ups ==
Year	Lineup	Releases
1986-1987	3rd-G Cristobal - guitars; Paco Arespacochaga - drums; Jonathan Buencamino - vocals
1987-1988	Ira Cruz - lead guitar; Jobert Buencamino - bass guitars; Jj Buencamino - keyboards; 3rd-G Cristobal - rhythm guitar; Paco Arespacochaga - drums; Jonathan Buencamino - vocals
1989-1991	Ira Cruz - guitars; Jobert Buencamino - bass guitars; Jj Buencamino - keyboards; Paco Arespacochaga - drums; Jonathan Buencamino - vocals	"Back to the Roots" (1990)
1991-1994	Vic Carpio - guitars; Jobert Buencamino - bass guitars; Jj Buencamino - keyboards; Paco Arespacochaga - drums; Jonathan Buencamino - vocals	Breaking New Grounds (1992); Line to Heaven (1993)
1994-1996	Paku Herrera - bass guitar; Vic Carpio - guitars; Jj Buencamino - keyboards; Paco Arespacochaga - drums; Jonathan Buencamino - vocals	Greatest Hits...Live (1994); One (1996)
1997-1999	Toto Villanueva - drums; Paku Herrera - bass guitar; Vic Carpio - guitars; Jj Buencamino - keyboards; Jonathan Buencamino - vocals	Eroplano (1997)
2000-2001	Ira Cruz - guitars; Jobert Buencamino - bass guitar; Vic Carpio - lead guitar; Jj Buencamino - keyboards; Paco Arespacochaga - drums; Jonathan Buencamino - vocals
2005-2006	Henry Abesamis - bass guitar; Jonathan Manuel - guitars; Jj Buencamino - keyboards; Paco Arespacochaga - drums; Jonathan Buencamino - vocals	A Brighter Day (2005)
2006-2008	Steve Guadiz - guitars; Chot Ulep - bass guitar; Jj Buencamino - keyboards; Paco Arespacochaga - drums; Jonathan Buencamino - vocals	New Beginnings (2007)
2009	Tim De Ramos - drums; Steve Guadiz - guitars; Chot Ulep - bass guitar; Jj Buencamino - keyboards; Paco Arespacochaga - lead guitars; Jonathan Buencamino - vocals
2009	Tim De Ramos - drums; Chot Ulep - bass guitar; Jj Buencamino - keyboards; Paco Arespacochaga - lead guitars; Jonathan Buencamino - vocals, guitars
2009-2011	G3 Misa - guitars; Gary Padre - bass guitar; Paco Arespacochaga - drums; Jj Buencamino - keyboards; Jonathan Buencamino - vocals
2012-2013	Jonathan Dela Paz - bass guitar; G3 Misa - guitars; Jj Buencamino - keyboards; Paco Arespacochaga - drums; Jonathan Buencamino - vocals
2013–2014	Art Pangilinan - keyboards; Jonathan Dela Paz - bass guitar; G3 Misa - guitars; Paco Arespacochaga - drums; Jonathan Buencamino - vocals
2015–2016	Jj Buencamino - keyboards; Jonathan Dela Paz - bass guitar; G3 Misa - guitars; Paco Arespacochaga - drums; Jonathan Buencamino - vocals	Where We Left Off (2016)
2016–2017	Vic Carpio - guitars; Jj Buencamino - keyboards; Jonathan Dela Paz - bass guitar; Paco Arespacochaga - drums; Jonathan Buencamino - vocals
2018–present	Vic Carpio - guitars; Jj Buencamino - keyboards; Paco Arespacochaga - drums; Jonathan Buencamino - vocals

== Discography ==
=== Studio albums ===
- Back to the Roots (Dyna Music, 1989)
- Breaking New Grounds (MCA Music Philippines, 1993)
- Line to Heaven (MCA Music Philippines, 1994)
- One (MCA Music Philippines, 1996)
- Eroplano (MCA Music Philippines, 1997)
- A Brighter Day (MCA Music Philippines, 2005)
- Where We Left Off (BMAD Media, 2016)

=== Live albums ===
- Greatest Hits...Live (PolyEast Records, 1994)

=== Compilation albums ===
- New Beginnings: The Greatest Hits Collection (2heaven Muzik, 2007)

== Singles ==
- "Just a Dream"
- "However Which Way"
- "Kaibigan"
- "Calling All Nations"
- "Maynila"
- "Lullabye"
- "Will I Survive"
- "'Di Na Ko Aasa Pa" (now covered by Sabrina Orial)
- "Binibini"
- "Are You Happy"
- "Line to Heaven" (1993)
- "Kailanman"
- "My Girl"
- "Kapayapaan"
- "Tell Me Why"
- "More Than a Friend"
- "Magkaisa Tayong Lahat"
- "Living My Life"
- "In a Little While"
- "Desire"
- "Nasaan Ka" (2013)
