= Kapatid =

Kapatid is the Tagalog word for "sibling".

Kapatid may refer to:

- Kapatid (band), a Filipino rock band formed in 2003
- TV5 Network, Philippine media and entertainment conglomerate
  - TV5 (Philippine TV network), known as the Kapatid Network, a television network in the Philippines
  - Kapatid Channel, a Philippine-based television channel available outside the Philippines
