= No Water, No Moon =

Studio album by Bamboo Mañalac
- Released: November 20, 2011
- Recorded: Ambient Studios
- Label: PolyEast Records
- Producer: Bamboo Mañalac and Pancho Gonzales

Bamboo Mañalac chronology
No Water, No Moon (2011)	Bless This Mess (2015)

Singles from No Water, No Moon
- 1. "Questions" Released: 2011; 2. "Ikot ng Mundo" Released: 2012; 3. "In This Life" Released: 2013; 4. "Carousel" Released: April 24, 2013

No Water, No Moon is the debut album by Bamboo Mañalac, released in 2011 by PolyEast Records, following his departure from his former band, Bamboo. Its lead single was "Questions". It was reissued in 2013 with bonus tracks.

== Track listing ==
All tracks are written by Bamboo Mañalac

No.	Title	Length
1.	"Questions"	6:21
2.	"In Shadow"	3:18
3.	"Please"	4:48
4.	"Morning Rose"	3:42
5.	"Back on My Feet"	4:02
6.	"Spin"	3:09
7.	"In This Life"	3:57
8.	"Down the Line"	4:35
9.	"All Hail the Fool"	4:02
10.	"The Only Way"	4:00
11.	"Just Go"	3:03
12.	"Ikot ng Mundo"	4:46

2013 re-issued version
No.	Title	Length
13.	"Carousel"	4:06
Total length:		53:45

== Personnel ==
- Bamboo Mañalac - vocals
- Ria Osorio - piano, keyboard, orchestrator
- Kakoy Legaspi - guitars
- Junjun Regalado - drums
- Simon Tan - bass guitar
- Bong Gonzales - guitars

Additional Musicians

- Joy Tamayo, Apple - Back Up Vocals
- Kids Choir - Isabella, Lucius, Nadia Tamayo, Vaikunta Tamayo, Zoe Tan, Danny Tan, Cai Yambao, Miles Reyes, Rolfe Reyes
- Mabuhay Singers - Raye Lucero, Cely Bautista, Peping De Leon
- Strings - Claudia Berenguer, DJ Salonga, Ed Pasamba, Tina Pasamba, Michelle Roque, Mitchie Andra, Patrick Feliciano, Ralph Taylan, Rodel Lorenzo, Roxanne Gutierrez, Silke Hipolito, Ranieza Santos
- Ikot Ng Mundo Choir - Angela Valdes, Stella Valdes, itas Valdes, Chico Gonzales
- Horns - Wowee De Guzman, Robert De Pano, Romy Javier, Benito San Jose, Romy San Jose

== Production ==
- Produced By: Bamboo Mañalac and Pancho Gonzales
- Arrangements By: Bamboo Mañalac, Ria Osario, Kakoy Legaspi
- Recorded at: Ambient Studios
- Engineer: Chaitanya Tamayo
- Guitar tracks for Questions, Back at my Feet, Please, In This Life, Morning Rose, The Only Way & In Shadows recorded at Trax Studios by Angee Rozul
- Mixed By: Scott Mcdowell at Hyde Street Studios
- Mastered By: Brad Blackwood at Euphonic Masters
- Label Manager: Ethel Cachapero
- Sleeve Design and Layout by: Willie A. Manzon
- Photography By: Mark Nicdao
- Styling By Millet Argaza
