= G3 Misa =

Filipino singer-songwriter

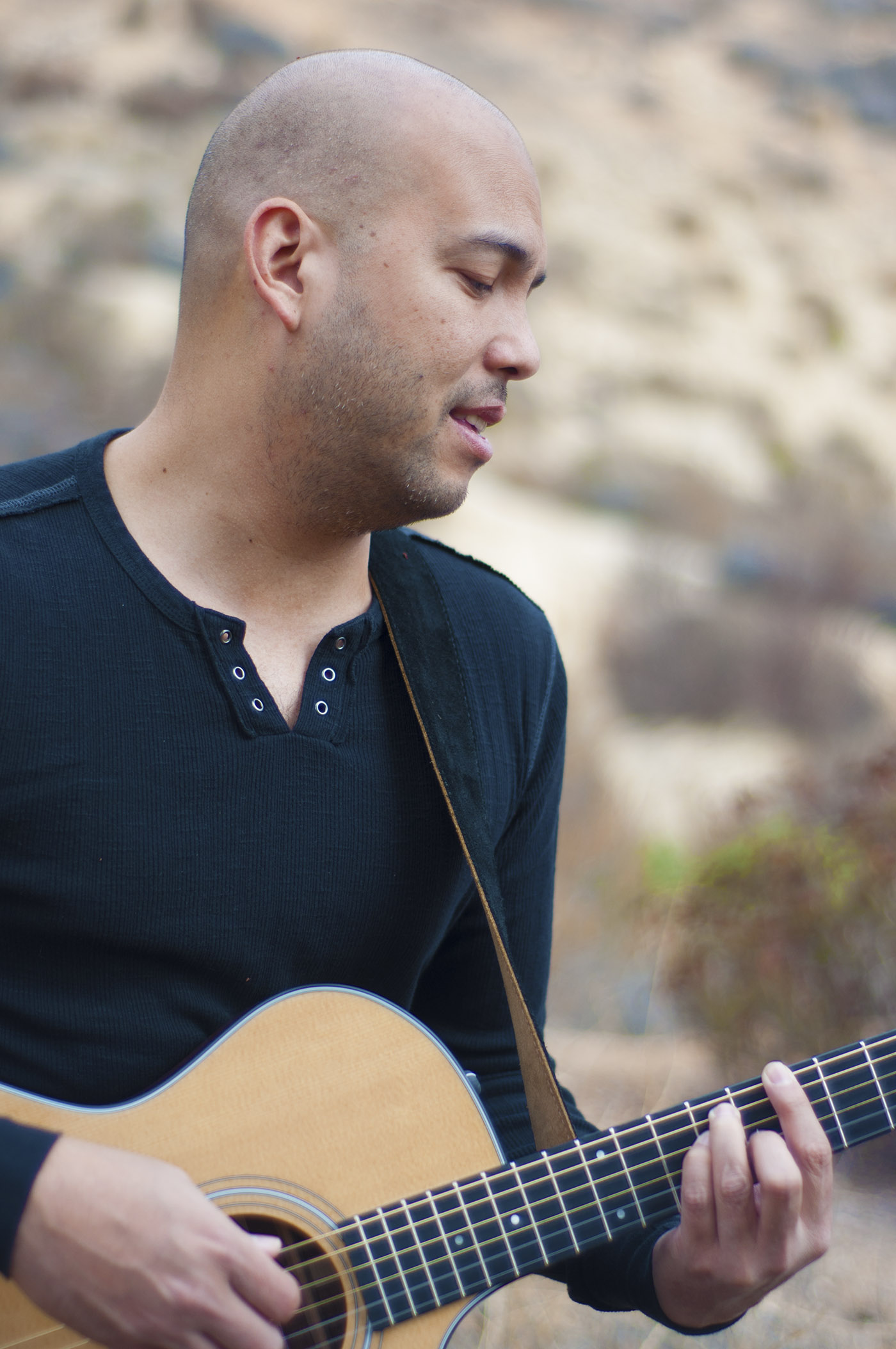
- G3 Misa with Taylor Guitar 2014

Background information
- Born: Guillermo Vicente Misa III; Manila, Philippines
- Origin: Manila, Philippines
- Genres: OPM, pop, rock, alternative rock
- Occupations: Musician, songwriter, software engineer
- Instruments: Vocals, guitar, bass guitar, drums, piano
- Years active: 1990–present
- Label: Claymind
- Website: www.g3misa.com

Guillermo Vicente Misa III, nicknamed "G3" is a Filipino singer/songwriter and recording artist based in Los Angeles. He is also the former lead guitarist of the band Introvoys.

He is known for the song "Habangbuhay", his carrier single from his 2014 solo album "Never Look Back". The music video for "Habangbuhay" features singer/actress Geneva Cruz as his leading lady.

G3 comes from a family of musicians. Jim Paredes of Apo Hiking Society is his uncle. G3 started playing acoustic guitar at the age of 13 when his dad, GV Misa (singer/actor/commercial model) taught him some 3 chord Beatles and Beach Boys songs. At age 15, he played the electric guitar and formed his first band 'Trial and Error' along with his classmates from De La Salle Santiago Zobel School. He continued on to play in various bands during his college days. G3 was a member of the bands Violent Playground, Spinning Jenny, Mystery and Shanghaied. He would occasionally play guitar for the band Rivermaya whenever Rico Blanco would get sick.

In 1991, G3 along with Vanessa Garcia of the band Prettier Than Pink put up a studio called "Session Band Rehearsal & Recording Studio" located at the basement parking of Makati Cinema Square. It was where bands like Rivermaya formed. Razorback and Wolfgang also rehearsed and recorded demo material at Session Studio.

== Violent Playground (1993) ==
In 1993, G3 was invited to be the guitarist of Violent Playground. The line up was RJ Oca on vocals, Raton del Gallego on guitar, Boom Jose on drums and Mali Andres on bass. They played regularly at "Weekends Live" at the Atrium of Makati.

== Shanghaied (1994) ==
In 1994, G3 joined the alternative rock band "Shanghaied", which recorded a cover of the hit song, "Batugan", by Labuyo from the compilation album "Mga Himig Natin – Pinoy Rock Revisited" under Vicor Records. Batugan became the number one song for 6 straight weeks at DWLA 105.9 radio. Other chart toppers included "Laklak" by The Teeth and "Lakas Tama" by Siakol. They also released their own version of "Little Drummer Boy" as part of a Christmas compilation album called "Christmas on the Rocks" under Viva Records.

== Mystery (1997) ==
In 1997, G3 got a call from his former classmate, Paco Arespacochaga to join his band Mystery. He went to Pink Noise recording studio thinking he would audition for guitars but he was asked to sing instead. His vocal audition made it straight into Mystery's album "Jigsaw" released under Star Records. They also released a music video for their single "Someday me and you" produced by Star Cinema. G3 also appeared as a guest along with his bandmates in the TV show Gimik.

== Career change (2000) ==
G3 had a passion for computer programming. He would always bring a programming book to a gig and read it during breaks. In 1995, he developed a Billing and Collection system as well as a Payroll system for his own business, Session Band Rehearsal and Recording Studio. In 2000, G3 left Mystery to pursue a software engineering career. He started as a software developer in Fujitsu Philippines where he learned Java, C# and SQL. In 2002, he became the Application Development Manager for Jollibee Foods Corporation, one of the biggest companies in the Philippines. In 2007, he migrated to Los Angeles to become a Lead Software Developer for Myspace. He then focused on e-commerce projects and implemented website and app projects for Vans, The North Face, Fandango, Fender Musical Instruments Corporation and Mercari. In 2012, he founded Claymind, a software company.

== Introvoys (2008–2016) ==
In Los Angeles, G3 got a call again from Paco Arespacochaga, asking if he could be the guitarist for Introvoys which was also now based in Los Angeles. G3 gladly agreed and is now actively writing songs, recording and performing with the band Introvoys. They released their latest album called "Where we left off" in January 2015. G3 wrote the songs "I don't wanna lose you" and "Sekreto" and co-wrote "Paradise", "Let's Dance", "Healing Hearts", "Why" and "Swim to the Sky".

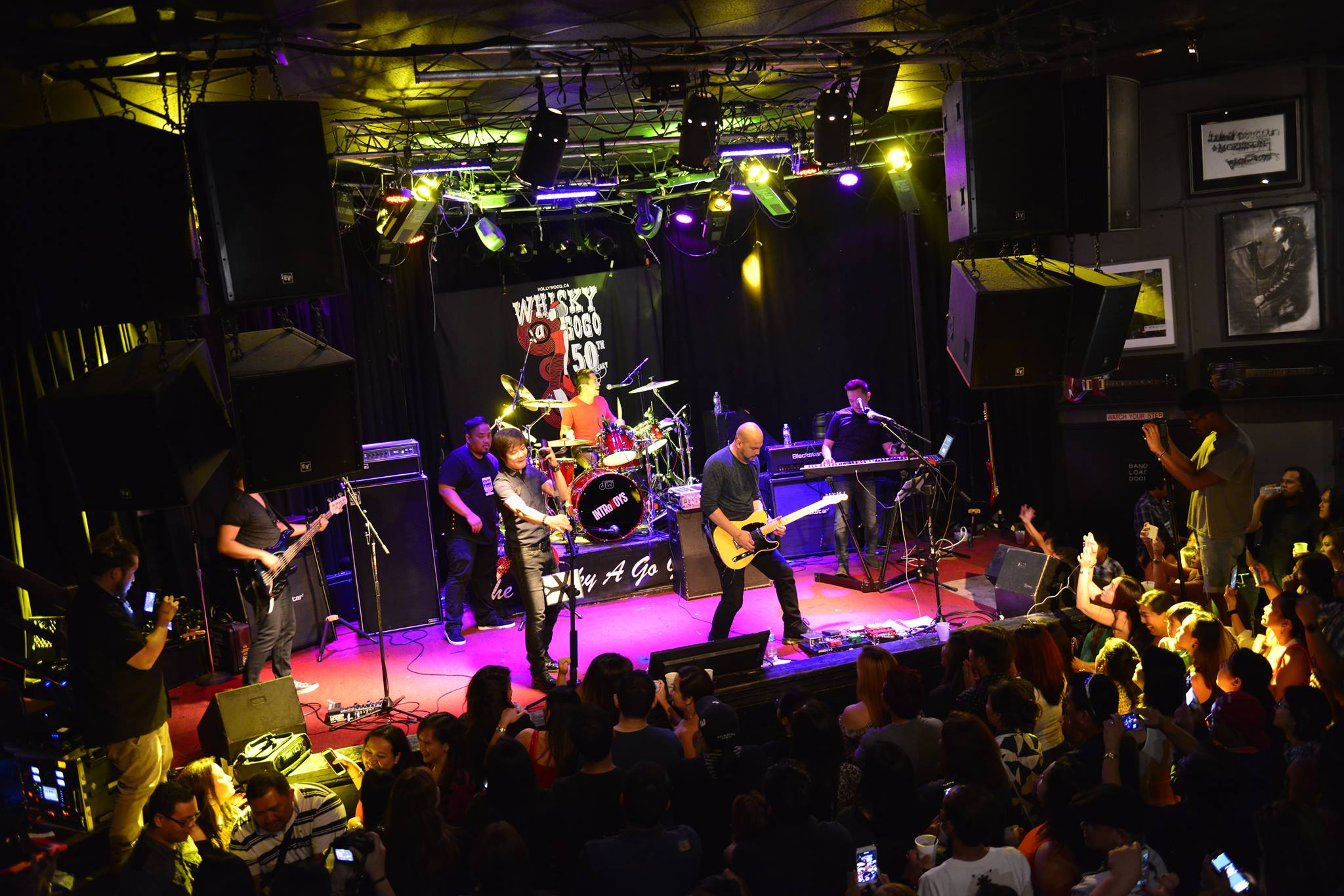
Introvoys Live at The Whisky a Go Go Hollywood

== Solo album (2014) ==
On November 12, 2014, G3 released his debut solo album entitled "Never Look Back" published by Claymind Music. His carrier single "Habangbuhay" featured Filipina singer and actress Geneva Cruz on its music video which was filmed in Los Angeles. G3 and Geneva are long time friends. Way back in 1999, G3 composed the song "How Can I Forget?" which was part of her album "On Fire". The Habangbuhay music video was directed and edited by Paco Arespacochaga. All 10 tracks in G3's album were composed, arranged, performed and recorded by G3 himself in his home studio.

== Gear and Equipment ==
G3 Misa mainly uses a Fender Telecaster and a Fender Stratocaster for live shows. He is also seen using a PRS Custom, a Gibson Les Paul, a Gibson ES-335 and a Gibson ES-175 on some occasions. For acoustic playing, he uses a Taylor 314CE. His guitar pedals include a Wampler Dual Fusion, a Wampler Tape Echo, a Wampler Faux Spring Reverb, a Dunlop 535Q Crybaby Wah, an Ernie Ball Volume Pedal, a Digitech Harmony Man and a Digitech Drop. G3 plugs into an Avalon VT-737sp Tube Preamp which goes straight into a Behringer X32 mixer. When not using In-Ear monitors, G3 uses a Fender Twin Reverb '65 Reissue or a Mesa Single Rectifier with 4x10 Mesa oversized cab.

== Live Session Performances ==
Artist	Venue	Year
Pepe Smith	Kampo	1994
Rivermaya	Enchanted Kingdom	1997
Geneva Cruz	Music Museum	1998
Antoinette Taus	Chicago	2013
Jett Pangan	Los Angeles; Chicago; San Diego; San Francisco	2014
Wency Cornejo	Los Angeles; Chicago; San Diego; San Francisco	2014
Cooky Chua	Los Angeles; Chicago; San Diego; San Francisco	2014
Gary Ignacio	Los Angeles; Chicago; San Diego; San Francisco	2014

== See also ==
- Introvoys
