= Bless This Mess =

Bless This Mess may refer to:

- Bless This Mess (TV series), American single-camera-sitcom, 2019
- Bless This Mess (By Divine Right album), 1999
- Bless This Mess (Lisa Mitchell album), 2012
- Bless This Mess (Bamboo Mañalac album), 2015
- Bless This Mess (U.S. Girls album), 2023
- Bless this Mess, a 2012 album by Prima Donna
