= Tomorrow Becomes Yesterday =

Studio album by Bamboo
- Released: September 26, 2008; September 9, 2010 (Repackaged Edition)
- Recorded: Tracks Studios
- Studio: Tracks Studios
- Length: 40:43 (Original Version) 43:45 (Repackaged Version)
- Label: EMI Philippines, Inc.

Bamboo chronology
We Stand Alone Together (2007)	Tomorrow Becomes Yesterday (2008)

Repackaged Version
- Released under PolyEast records, Inc.

Singles from Tomorrow Becomes Yesterday
- 1. "Kailan" Released: August 22, 2008; 2. "Last Days On A Cruise Ship (Don't Wait For Tomorrow)" Released: March 7, 2009; 3. "Muli" Released: July 3, 2009; 4. "Kalayaan" Released: March 29, 2010; 5. "Bagong Sigaw" Released: April 13, 2010

Tomorrow Becomes Yesterday is the fourth and final album of the Filipino alternative rock band Bamboo, originally released in 2008. It is the first release of original material by the band since 2005's Light Peace Love. It achieved platinum status on September 28, 2008 (two days after its release).

In 2010, the band released a new single "Bagong Sigaw" and repackaged version of the album with a bonus DVD containing music videos of the singles released in the album.

== Track listing ==
All tracks are written by Nathan Azarcon and Bamboo (band), except where noted

No.	Title	Writer(s)	Length
1.	"Kalayaan"		3:38
2.	"Blown Away"		4:14
3.	"Little Child"		3:40
4.	"Kailan"	with Keith Errol "KEN" Navarroza	4:19
5.	"Nobody Knows"		4:49
6.	"24/7"		3:07
7.	"Last Days On A Cruise Ship (Don't Wait For Tomorrow)"		4:17
8.	"Wake Up Call"		3:21
9.	"Muli"	Epy Quizon	5:23
10.	"Looking Out For #1"		3:55

2010 Repackaged Edition
No.	Title	Length
11.	"Bagong Sigaw"	3:02
12.	"Kailan (Music Video)"
13.	"Last Days On A Cruise Ship (Don't Wait For Tomorrow) (Music Video)"
14.	"Muli (Music Video)"
15.	"Kalayaan (Music Video)"

== Personnel ==
- Francisco "Bamboo" Mañalac - lead vocals
- Ira Cruz - guitars
- Nathan Azarcon - bass, vocals
- Vic Mercado - drums

== Album credits ==
- Mixed and recorded by Angee Rozul/Tracks Studios
- Mastered by Gil Tamazyan/Threshold sound+vision
- Cover layout: wham!
