= P.O.T. =

Filipino rock band

- Origin: Manila, Philippines
- Genres: Pinoy rock, alternative rock, funk metal, stoner metal
- Years active: 1994–2000, 2004–2005, 2022-present
- Label: PolyEast Records
- Members: Mally Paraguya; Ian Umali; Red Dela Peña; Les Banzuelo
- Past members: Karl Roy; Francis Reyes; Jeff Lima; Harley Alarcon; Jayman Alviar

P.O.T. was a Filipino rock band, formed in 1994 and officially disbanded in 2005. The band was fronted by Karl Roy who also fronted the bands Advent Call and Kapatid. The group is famous for their 1997 remake of the song "Yugyugan Na", originally performed by The Advisors in 1977. The band held a reunion concert on July 22, 2006, at The 70's Bistro in Quezon City. On 1997, Harley Alarcon left the band and was replaced by Jay Alviar who also left a year later. In 1999, Ian Umali left the band to go back to school and continue his studies.

In February 2005, EMI Philippines released a repackaged version of the first (and only) P.O.T. album. with an additional bonus tracks a new version of the song Ulitin", “Piece of This", and “Panaginip", as well as a brand new song.

The initials of the band name P.O.T. is a pseudo-acronym, meaning it doesn't stand for anything at all or as what Karl Roy stated in an interview, fans of the band can freely decide in making up any meanings that fit the initials.

In the early morning of March 13, 2012, Karl Roy died due to cardiac arrest.

== Return ==
P.O.T. performed again for the first time in almost 16 years on June 25, 2022, at The 70's Bistro with original members Paraguya and Umali, Red Dela Peña of Ojo Rojo (Red Eye) filling in for vocals, and Reli de Vera on drums. The band kicked off their return with a show on July 16, 2022, at 19 East in Parañaque City.

== Members ==
=== Current Members ===
- Mally Paraguya – Bass
- Ian Umali – Guitars
- Red Dela Peña – Lead Vocals
- Les Banzuelo – Drums

=== Former Members ===
- Karl Roy† – Lead Vocals
- Harley Alarcon – Drums
- Francis Reyes – Guitars
- Jeff Lima – Drums
- Carol Hope Castillo – Drums
- Jayman Alviar – Drums
- Reli De Vera – Drums
- JP Dela Rama – Drums

=== Session musicians ===
- Tom Vinoya – Keyboards
- Jay Gapasin – Percussion
- Jam Bumanlag – Guitars
- Aldrin Asuncion – Drums

== Discography ==
=== Studio albums ===
- P.O.T. (1997; PolyEast Records)
- Remastered (2005; PolyEast Records)

== Singles ==
- "Yugyugan Na!"
- "Fishcake"
- "F.Y.B."
- "Hindi N'yo Alam"
- "Overload"
- "Love to See"
- "Monkey on my Back"
- "Posse-bility"
- "Panaginip"
- "Don't Blink"
- "Ulitin"
- "Piece of This"
- "It Don't Matter"

== Awards ==
Year	Award giving body	Category	Nominated work	Results
1997	NU Rock Awards	Best New Artist	—N/a	Won
1997	NU Rock Awards	Album of the Year	"P.O.T"	Won
1997	NU Rock Awards	Bassist of the Year	(for Mally Paraguya)	Won
1997	NU Rock Awards	Drummer of the Year	(for Harley Alarcon)	Won
1998	"4th Katha Music Awards"	Best New Artist	—N/a	Nominated
1998	"4th Katha Music Awards"	Best Rock Performance by a Duo or Group with Vocal	"Yugyugan Na"	Won
1998	"4th Katha Music Awards"	Best Rock Album	"P.O.T"	Won
1998	"11th Awit Award"	Best Performance a New Duo or Group of Recording Artists	"Yugyugan Na"	Won
1998	"11th Awit Award"	Best Performance by a Duo or Group of Recording Artists	"Yugyugan Na"	Won
