= Ira Cruz =

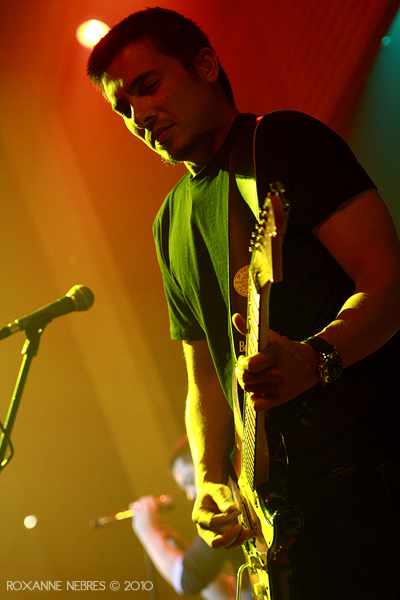
- Ira Cruz at Rock Overload Festival 2010

Background information
- Origin: Philippines
- Genres: Rock, alternative rock, OPM
- Occupations: Musician, songwriter
- Instruments: Guitar, acoustic guitar, bass guitar, vocals
- Years active: 1986–present
- Labels: EMI Music Philippines, Inc.

Ira Cara Cruz is a Filipino musician, songwriter and producer. He was a founding member of Filipino rock bands Hijo, Bamboo, Introvoys, Passage and Kapatid.

== Professional background ==
=== Introvoys (1987-1991, 2001) ===
Introvoys was formed in 1986 by 3rd-G Cristobal, Paco Arespacochaga, and Jonathan Buencamino. Their first album was a "diamond in the rough". After two singles, Dyna Records, which was the band's label, was ready to drop them like a hot potato. However, fate had a different plan. "However Which way" which was the band's third single shot all the way to No. 1 in Metro Manila in just 2 weeks. After a month, the song became the country's No. 1 song thus paving the way for a national tour for the Introvoys. Culled from the same album are certified No. 1 singles such as "Calling All Nations", "Maynila" and "Lullabye", among many others. Their second album sealed Introvoys' status in the mainstream. Born from this album were songs that are now classified as standard hits. These songs are "Will I Survive", "Di Na Ko Aasa Pa", "Binibini" and "Are You Happy". Eventually, the album shot to quadruple platinum status earning the Introvoys the tagged "the No. 1 Band in the Land!". In 1994, they released the album Line to Heaven which has melodies that are catchy and pop-inflected, some of which are imbedded in rock-styled arrangements. The carrier single was written after Arespacochaga suffered a terrible tragedy, the loss of his parents in a car accident. He left the band in 1996 rejoined in 2000. Ira Cruz, who had played with Introvoys from 1987 to 1991, joined Passage and Kapatid. In 2001, Ira rejoined Introvoys for the short-lived reunion run.

=== Kapatid (2002-2003) ===
Kapatid (English: Siblings; Brother/ Sister) came together through an informal gathering of friends with diverse musical talents in other bands. The original lineup included Karl Roy of Advent Call and P.O.T.; Marinito "J-hoon" Balbuena of Kjwan; Ira Cruz previously of Passage; Azarcon; and Chico Molina. In 2002, the band went on to release their debut album "Edsa 524". The album contains the singles "Pagbabalik Ng Kwago", "I like it like this", and "Visions". The band split apart rather quickly, with a couple of members leaving for other bands under less than amicable circumstances. Roy later stated of the breakup, "There was lots of talk about brotherhood and respect and the joy of playing music together. Unfortunately, things didn’t turn that way. The band split apart rather quickly, as a couple of members left for another band, under less amicable circumstances. First, Ira left, and then Nathan followed, and the two eventually hooked up with Bamboo."

=== Bamboo (2003-2011) ===
In 2003, after living in Los Angeles following the Rivermaya tour in America, Mañalac returned to the Philippines. Azarcon introduced Mañalac to Cruz and Vic Mercado (drums) and together, they formed Bamboo.

In January 2011, News had been circulating that Bamboo has allegedly disbanded. DJ KC Montero of Wave 89.1 confirmed the breakup on Wave's The KC Show and via Twitter.

Montero clarified that all the members of the band "have decided to move on," and that he does not know why they called it quits. The group has not released an official statement on the issue, according to ABS-CBNNews.com.

Bamboo's lead vocalist Francisco "Bamboo" Mañalac finally confirmed the breakup of his band in an official statement posted before midnight of January 11 on the group's website.

==== As the Music Plays ====
In February 2004, Bamboo released their debut album, As the Music Plays. The album was certified Double Platinum by the Philippine Association of the Record Industry (PARI). A double-disc repackaged edition was released in 2005.

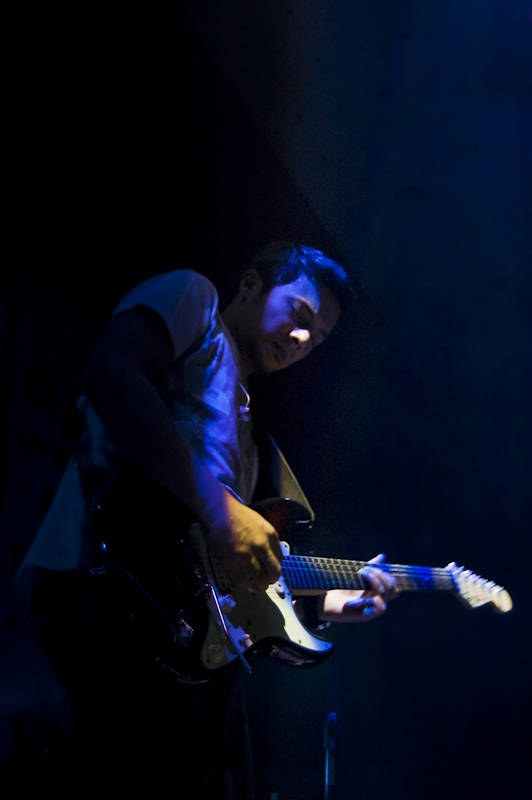
Ira Cruz on a live gig with Bamboo

The first single from the album, "Noypi" (a slang term meaning "Filipino"), was a hard rock anthem that captivated the hearts of the youth and sparked patriotism in the Philippines. The album contains ten tracks, with three in Tagalog, namely: "Noypi", "Hudas", and "Masaya". The initial release of the album used a white cover, while a second black-cover release later in the year contained six bonus tracks and three video clips of "Noypi", "Masaya", and "Mr. Clay".

The album was honored at the AWIT Awards, NU Rock Awards, and MTV Pilipinas Music Awards. The Awit Awards honored them as the Best Performance of a New Duo or Group Recording Artists for their performance of "Noypi". The song was also honored as Best Rock Recording of the Year and People's Choice Favorite Song of the Year. Bamboo received the MTV Award for Favorite New Artist in a Video, Favorite Group Video, and Favorite Song for "Noypi". The NU Rock Awards honored the band with the awards for Listener's Choice, Song of the Year, and Band of the Year. Mercado was additionally honored as Best Drummer, while Mañalac was recognized as Best Vocalist.

==== "Noypi" ====
Rumors circulating the Pinoy rock scene were rampantly claiming that (karl)Roy wrote "Noypi" (originally as a reggae song) and that Azarcon stole the song from him. The truth about the recording was offered in a 2008 interview with Karl Roy, presented in Rogue Magazine. Nathan had originally written the megahit rock anthem "Noypi" for Kapatid, but Karl didn't like it. "It takes a while for me to like a song," Karl explains, and to this day, he regrets not paying enough attention to what Nathan was doing.

The album was honored at the AWIT Awards, NU Rock Awards, and MTV Pilipinas Music Awards. The band also won Awit Awards for Best Performance of a New Duo or Group Recording Artists for their performance of "Noypi". The song was also honored as Best Rock Recording of the Year and People's Choice Favorite Song of the Year. the band also received the MTV Award for Favorite New Artist in a Video, Favorite Group Video, and Favorite Song for "Noypi". The NU Rock Awards honored the band with the awards for Listener's Choice, Song of the Year, and Band of the Year.

==== Light Peace Love ====
In 2005, Bamboo released their second album, Light Peace Love. The album received the Awit Award for Album of the Year. The album was certified Platinum by PARI.

The song "Much Has Been Said" received the award for Best Ballad of the Year, while the song "Hallelujah" was honored with the 2006 Awit Award for People's Choice as Favorite Song and Best Rock Recording. The song "Hallelujah" was released prior to the actual release of the album, becoming an instant hit and winning the 2006 Awit Award for People's Choice as Favorite Song and Best Rock Recording.

In addition to rock, the band incorporated a variety of styles including rap or scat-style singing, as well as a gospel music theme on the song "Alpha Beta Omega". In 2006, the band was honored at the MTV Pilipinas Music Awards for Best Cinematography in a Video for the song "Much Has Been Said".

==== We Stand Alone Together ====
In 2007, Bamboo released their third album, We Stand Alone Together. The album is a double disc recording package of revived cover songs. The album also includes a cover of Sting's "Englishman In New York", presented as a hidden track.

Among the cover songs included on the album are Buklod's "Tatsulok" and Anak Bayan's "Probinsyana" from Anak Bayan, Pearl Jam's "Alive", and Paul Simon's "50 Ways to Leave Your Lover". It also includes bonus tracks like unplugged versions of their hit songs from previous albums such as "Mr. Clay", "These Days", and "Hallelujah". "Tatsulok" and "Probinsyana" were released as singles and became hits on local radio.

In 2008, the Awit Awards honored "Tatsulok" with the awards for Best Performance by a Group Recording Artist and Best Rock Song. "Probinsyana" received the awards for Best Musical Arrangement, Best Engineered Recording, and Music Video of the Year. NU Rock Awards recognized the band as the Best Live Act. The album was certified Gold by PARI.

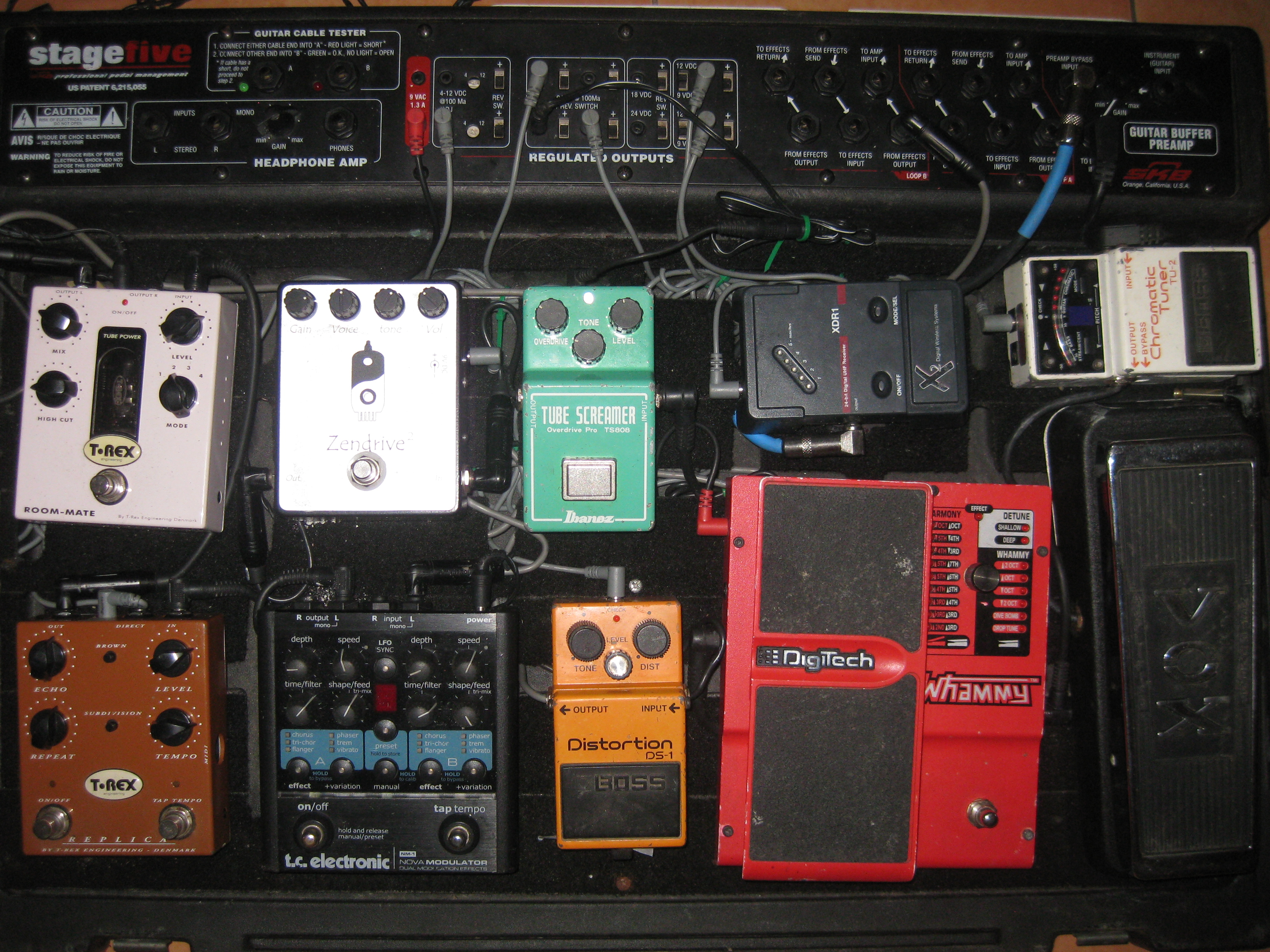
Ira Cruz's pedalboard

==== Tomorrow Becomes Yesterday ====
The band's Tomorrow Becomes Yesterday album was certified Platinum status on September 28, 2008 — two days after its release. The album consists of ten tracks with the lead-off single "Kailan". The title of the album came from the phrase of the fifth track, "Little Child".

Hits from Tomorrow Becomes Yesterday include "Last Days On A Cruise Ship (Don't Wait For Tomorrow)" and "Probinsyana". The 2008 Awit Awards honored "Probinsyana" as Best Musical Arrangement, Best Engineered Recording, and Music Video of the Year. The NU Rock Awards recognized "Last Days On A Cruise Ship" as Music Video of the Year.

=== Hijo (2011) ===
Three months after the breakup of Bamboo, Azarcon and three former members reunited to form the band Hijo. The new band is composed of Nathan Azarcon on vocals and bass, Ira Cruz on guitar, and Vic Mercado on drums. The band also includes Junji Lerma on guitar and Jay-O Orduna on keyboards and backing vocals. They performed their first gig at Route 196 on April 16, 2011. Orduna was eventually replaced by Wowee Posadas while Mecado was replaced by Paolo Manuel. In 2015, Posadas did not return to Hijo for their short-lived reunion.

== Awards ==
Philippine Radio Music Awards

- International Artist Award (2009)

Awit Awards

- Best Performance by a New Group Recording Artist - "Noypi" (2005)
- Best Rock Recording - "Noypi" (2005)
- People's Choice Favorite Song - "Noypi" (2005)
- Best Performance by a New Group Recording Artist - "Hallelujah" (2006)
- Album of the Year - "Light Peace Love" (2006)
- Song of the Year - "Hallelujah" (2006)
- Best Ballad Recording - "Much Has Been Said" (2006)
- Best Rock Recording - "Hallelujah" (2006)
- People's Choice Favorite Song - "Hallelujah" (2006)
- Best Performance by a Group Recording Artist - "Tatsulok" (2008)
- Best Rock Song - "Tatsulok" (2008)
- Best Musical Arrangement - "Probinsyana" (2008)
- Best Engineered Recording - "Probinsyana" (2008)
- Music Video of the Year - "Probinsyana" (2008)

NU Rock Awards

- Guitarist of the Year - Ira Cruz (2003)
- Artist of the Year (2004)
- Song of the Year - "Noypi" (2004)
- Vocalist of the Year - Bamboo Mañalac (2004)
- Drummer of the Year - Vic Mercado (2004)
- Listeners Choice Awardee (2004)
- Album of the Year - "Light Peace Love" (2005)
- Vocalist of the Year - Bamboo Mañalac (2005)
- Listeners Choice Awardee (2005)
- Artist of the Year (2007)
- Guitarist of the Year - Ira Cruz (2007)
- Bassist of the Year - Nathan Azarcon (2007)
- Drummer of the Year - Vic Mercado and Mark Escueta of Rivermaya (2007)
- Listeners Choice Awardee (2007)
- Best Live Act (2007)
- Music Video of the Year - "Last Days On A Cruise Ship" (2009)

MTV Pilipinas

- Favorite New Artist in a Video - Noypi (2004)
- Favorite Song - "Noypi" (2004)
- Favorite Group Video - "Noypi" (2004)
- Guitarist of the Year - Ira Cruz (2004)
- MTV Ayos! Best Commercial Video - "Fiestamazing" (2005)
- Best Cinematography in a Video - "Much Has Been Said" (2006)

93.1 RX Year End Awards

- Song of the Year - "Noypi (2004)
- New Local Artist of the Year (2004)
- Group of the Year (2004)

89.9 TM Year End Awards

- Song of the Year - "Masaya" (2004)
- New Local Artist of the Year (2004)
- Song of the Year - "Noypi" (2005)

SOP Music Awards

- Strictly Alternative Category Winner - "Hallelujah" (2005)

SOP Pasiklaband

- Best Rock Band (2006)
- Vocalist of the Year - Bamboo Mañalac (2006)

ALIW AWARDS

- Most Promising Entertainer (2006)
- Best Major Concert-(Group) (2006)

THE 2bU! CLICK AWARDS

- Most Clickable Band (2006)

Box Office Entertainment Awards

- Most Popular Recording Group (2007)

== Discography ==
Year	Album title	Band
1989	Ten of Another Kind	Introvoys
1991	Back to the Roots	Introvoys
1995	Passage	Passage
2000	The Disco Project	Passage
2003	Kapatid	Kapatid
2004	As the Music Plays	Bamboo
2005	Light Peace Love	Bamboo
2007	We Stand Alone Together	Bamboo
2008	Tomorrow Becomes Yesterday	Bamboo

== See also ==
- Bamboo
- Introvoys
- Kapatid
