= Charlie Green (album) =

Studio album by Charlie Green
- Released: 2008
- Recorded: September–October 2008
- Genres: Pop, jazz, swing, Big band
- Length: 30:01
- Label: Star Records

Charlie Green chronology
Charlie Green (2008)	A Friend Like You (2010)

Charlie Green is the debut album of English child swing singer Charlie Green. The album was released under Star Records in autumn 2008.

== Track listing ==
No.	Title	Length
1.	"Summer Wind"	3:00
2.	"What a Wonderful World"	3:36
3.	"Fly Me to the Moon"	2:30
4.	"All of Me"	2:30
5.	"Smile"	2:37
6.	"Mama Said So"	2:37
7.	"In My World"	3:01
8.	"Dahil Sa'yo"	3:19
9.	"Hands Around the World"	3:43
10.	"Rockin' Around the Christmas Tree"	2:37
11.	"Santa Claus Is Coming to Town"	2:31
