= Karl Roy =

Filipino singer (1968–2012)

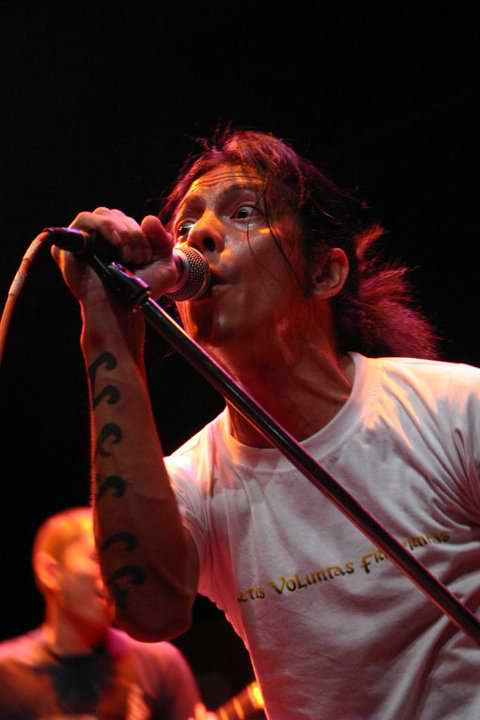
- Roy performing with Kapatid in 2005

Background information
- Born: May 25, 1968; Manila, Philippines
- Died: March 13, 2012 (aged 43) San Juan, Metro Manila, Philippines
- Genres: Pinoy rock, funk rock
- Occupation: Rock singer
- Instrument: Vocals

Karl Roy (May 25, 1968 – March 13, 2012) was a Filipino rock singer. He was the lead singer of the groups Advent Call, Kapatid and P.O.T.

== Early life ==
Karl Roy was the elder brother of Kevin Roy, the lead singer of the band Razorback, and the first cousin of Jose "Judd" Roy III, one of the defense lawyers of the impeachment trial of Philippine Chief Justice Renato Corona. Roy's other siblings are Ralph, Keith, Krys and Kathryn. His aunt was Vilma Roy-Duavit, the wife of GMA Network founder and former Representative from Rizal's 1st District Gilberto Duavit Sr., which makes him cousins with GMA Network president Gilberto Duavit Jr. His late grandfather, Jose Roy, was a Senator in the Philippines.

Roy was also a member of the Tau Gamma Phi fraternity.

== Music career ==
Roy began his career in 1990, when he replaced Reujen Lista as lead vocalist of the alternative group Advent Call; but he did not become well known to the general public until after founding another rock band, P.O.T. in 1994, especially when the group had hits with "Yugyugan Na" ("Time to shake"), "Panaginip", "Overload" and "Have a Piece of This". Roy was one of the most influential Filipino artists of his time. "Yugyugan Na" was a cover of the song by the band The Advisors. P.O.T. ended up going on an indefinite hiatus in 2000, but later reformed in 2004. The group, however, officially disbanded in 2005. Two years prior, he formed a new group named Kapatid together with Nathan Azarcon (bass), J-Hoon Balbuena (drums), Ira Cruz (guitar) and Chico Molina (guitar). With Kapatid, he released the albums Kapatid (2003) and Luha (2006). Roy's rock image made him a crowd favorite. He was also popularly known for his eccentric behavior while performing on stage. In September 2007, shortly after returning home from the recording of a TV commercial for San Miguel's Red Horse Beer, Roy suffered a stroke, paralyzing the right side of his body. He recovered, however, and rejoined Kapatid.

== Personal life ==
Roy has a daughter named Ariana Nicole (born 1994), his only child with his ex-girlfriend Maria Nieves San Diego (Yvette). Roy married Dena Devries in 2000. Roy was also famous for being an avid tattoo and piercing wearer. He had a wide variety of tattoos and piercings all over his body.

== Death ==
Karl Roy died on March 13, 2012, reportedly due to cardiac arrest, although he was diagnosed with pulmonary edema. Prior to his death, he was rushed to the Cardinal Santos Medical Center (sometimes also known as the Cardinal Rufino Santos Hospital) in San Juan City where he was put in ICU. He is survived by his wife Dena and daughter Ariana. Hours after his death, Roy became the top trending topic on Twitter Philippines. His remains were cremated and his wake was held at the Our Lady of Mount Carmel Shrine in New Manila, Quezon City. On March 18, his urn was transferred to his family mausoleum at the Loyola Memorial Park as the permanent resting place.
