= Kapatid (band) =

Filipino rock band formed in 2003

- Origin: Quezon City, Philippines
- Genres: Pinoy rock, progressive rock, experimental rock
- Years active: 2003–2012
- Labels: PolyEast Records, Sony Music Philippines
- Past members: Karl Roy (deceased); Chico Molina (deceased); J-Hoon Balbuena; Louie Talan; Ira Cruz; Nathan Azarcon; Philippe Arriola; Anjones Elemos; Paolo Rosal

Kapatid was a Filipino rock supergroup fronted by Karl Roy, the brother of Kevin Roy of Razorback. He was also the vocalist of bands Advent Call and P.O.T.

The band was originally composed of Nathan Azarcon (of Rivermaya, Bamboo and Hijo) on bass, J-Hoon Balbuena (of Kjwan) on drums, Ira Cruz (of Passage, Bamboo and Hijo) on rhythm guitar and the late Chico Molina on lead guitar. The band was managed by Pam Lunar. They went on to release their first self-titled LP with hit songs "Prayer", "Pagbabalik ng Kwago", and "Visions" among others, in 2003.

== Career ==
Joined by Karl Roy were veteran musician and bassist Louie Talan (of Razorback), guitarist Anjones Elemos, and drummer Paolo Rosal (of Queso, formerly Cheese). Together they recorded their second album Luha, with carrier songs "Doon", "Psycho Love", and "Sunday Shining" (included in the Pinoy Blonde soundtrack), released in February 2006 and distributed by Sony Records.

== Death of Karl Roy ==
On March 13, 2012, Roy, the band's lead vocalist, died due to cardiac arrest.

== Discography ==
- Kapatid (2003)
- Luha (2006)
- Kapatid EP (2009)

=== Compilation appearances ===
- The Best of Manila Sound: Hopia Mani Popcorn - "Hanggang Magdamag"

== Members ==
=== Final line-up ===
- Karl Roy† – lead vocals
- Anjones Elemos† – lead guitar
- Ryan Ventura – bass guitar
- Paolo Rosal – drums

=== Former members ===
- Chico Molina† – lead guitar
- Nathan Azarcon – bass guitar
- Ira Cruz – rhythm guitar
- J-Hoon Balbuena – drums
- Louie Talan – bass guitar
- Paul Zialcita – percussion

== Awards and nominations ==
| Year | Award giving body | Category | Nominated work | Results |
|---|---|---|---|---|
| 2003 | NU Rock Awards | Guitarist of the Year | Ira Cruz | Won |
| 2003 | NU Rock Awards | Vocalist of the Year | Karl Roy | Nominated |
| 2003 | NU Rock Awards | Bassist of the Year | Nathan Azarcon | Nominated |
| 2003 | NU Rock Awards | Drummer of the Year | J-hoon Balbuena | Nominated |
| 2003 | NU Rock Awards | Producer of the Year | Bob Aves & Kapatid for Kapatid album | Nominated |
| 2003 | NU Rock Awards | Best New Artist | — | Nominated |
| 2006 | NU Rock Awards | Drummer of the Year | J-hoon Balbuena | Nominated |
