= Bamboo Mañalac =

Filipino musician (born 1976)

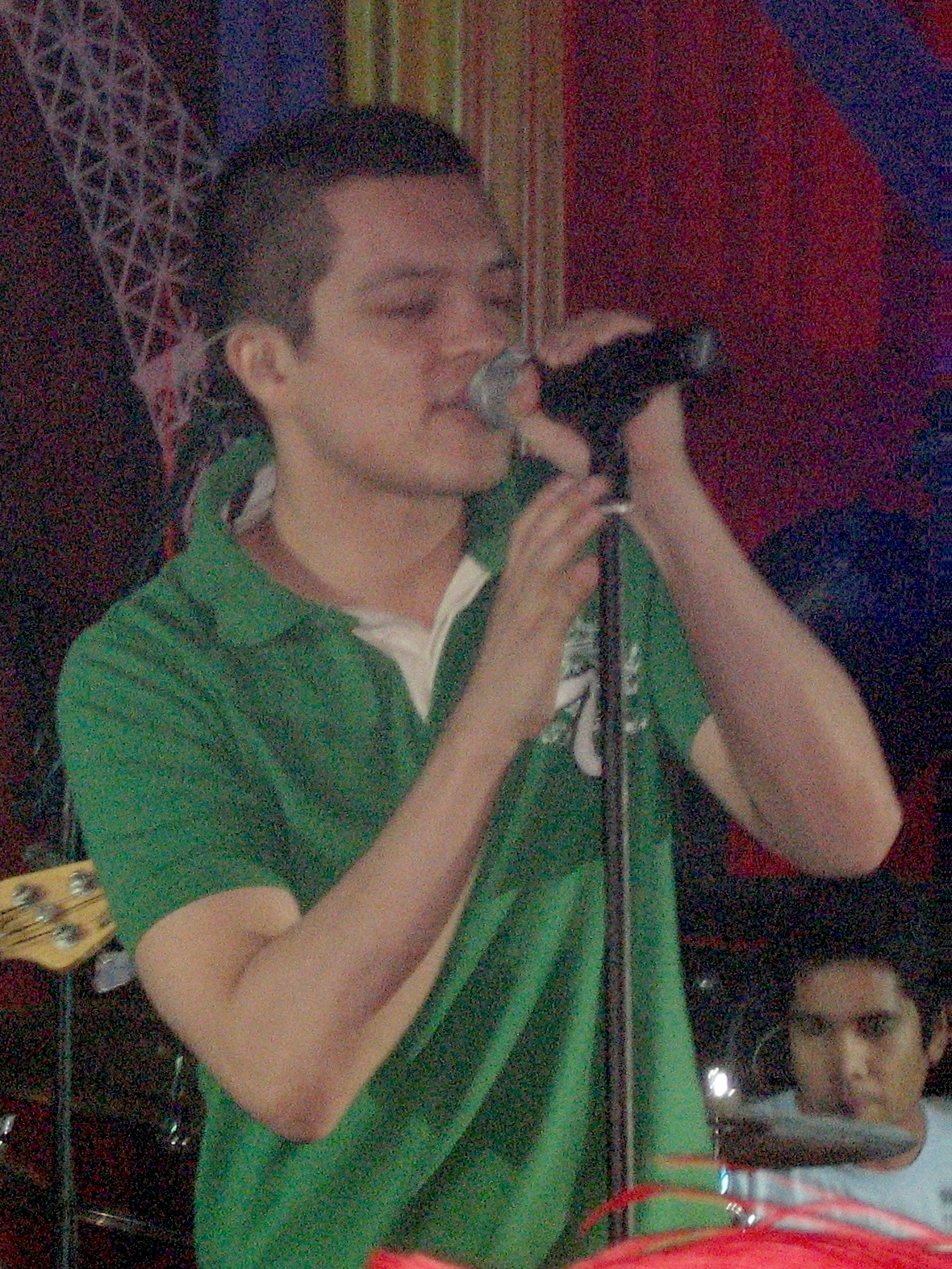
- Bamboo in 2006

Background information
- Also known as: Bamboo; "The Prince of (Philippine) Rock"; "The Rock Vocal Maestro"; "The Rockstar Royalty"
- Born: Francisco Gaudencio Lope Belardo Mañalac; March 21, 1976 (age 50); Quezon City, Metro Manila, Philippines
- Origin: San Francisco, California, U.S.
- Genres: OPM; Pinoy rock; alternative rock; pop rock; bluegrass; jazz fusion
- Occupations: Musician; singer; songwriter
- Instruments: Vocals; guitar
- Years active: 1994–present
- Label: PolyEast Records
- Website: Official website

Francisco Gaudencio Lope Belardo Mañalac (Tagalog pronunciation: [mɐɲaˈlɐk]; born March 21, 1976), popularly known as Bamboo Mañalac or simply by the mononym Bamboo, is a Filipino musician, singer, and songwriter. He began his career as vocalist and original frontman of Rivermaya and later fronted his own band, Bamboo. Bamboo band disbanded in 2011 and Mañalac then pursued a solo career and released his first solo album, No Water, No Moon.

Mañalac is known for his distinct vocals, which combines elements of rock with a mellow technique; he also has a notably eccentric style in live performances. His musical and singing style as well as his band's polished sound have made him an icon in the Philippine music industry.

== Early life ==
Bamboo Mañalac was born as Francisco Gaudencio Lope Belardo Mañalac in Quezon City, Metro Manila, Philippines to Filipino parents. His family emigrated to San Francisco, California when he was ten years old and he spent the rest of his childhood there. He was named after his grandfathers, father, and coincidentally after his home city. His mother gave him the nickname “Bamboo” when he was still a kid.

== Career ==
=== Band frontman ===
==== 1994–1998: Rivermaya ====
Rivermaya's roots came from a band named Xaga consisting of Jesse Gonzales on vocals, Kenneth Ilagan on guitars, Nathan Azarcon on bass guitar, Rome Velayo on drums, and Rico Blanco on keyboards and backing vocals. The band was managed by Lizza Nakpil and director Chito S. Roño. In the process of grueling practice sessions, Azarcon's former schoolmate Mañalac replaced Gonzales, as well as Azarcon's childhood friend, Mark Escueta, replaced Velayo, and later, Ilagan was replaced with Perf de Castro. With Ilagan leaving and de Castro as guitarist, the band members themselves decided to disband Xaga and form the band Rivermaya. They started putting together original songs like "Ulan", "214", and "Awit ng Kabataan" in demo form for prospective recording companies. Since its formation, the band has launched several successful albums, received numerous awards, and has undertaken several successful concerts and tours.

After the band's successful US and Canada tours, Mañalac decided to leave the band after a 4-year stint and stay with his family in the United States. His last performance with the band was on October 10, 1998, in Oakland, CA. Despite the popular belief and rumors saying that he was removed from the group due to drug addiction, Mañalac dismissed this as a mere "fan theory" claiming that he does not even smoke and have not tried taking drugs ever since, even out of curiosity. He actually went back to school in San Francisco and Los Angeles and took up English, Philosophy and Film which were his majors and did several odd jobs.

==== 2003–2011: Bamboo ====
In 2002, after living in Los Angeles following the Rivermaya tour in America, Mañalac returned to the Philippines. His former bandmate in Rivermaya, Nathan Azarcon, introduced him to Ira Cruz and Vic Mercado. Later, all of them joined together and formed the band Bamboo. Since then, the band had launched four successful albums, and received numerous awards.

Rumors were initially spreading on January 10, 2011, after KC Montero tweeted on Twitter that the band has decided to call it quits. On January 11, 2011, Mañalac published an official statement in the band's official website. He said:

As a group we've come to a point where you have to trust your gut, your heart and your head and accept that all things change. The hardest part as always is to know when to pack it up and part ways." He further said that, "We've learned that this journey is not only about us but includes all who came along for the trip. Family, friends and of course our front row believers who were there for the best reason of all. To simply listen. So it didn't come easy winding down to this decision. So here we go. IT'S OFFICIAL. THE BAND. IT'S OVER.

=== Solo career ===
==== 2011–present ====
In November 2011, Mañalac released his solo debut album, No Water, No Moon, under the label of PolyEast Records. The album consists of 12 tracks with "Questions" as its carrier single. The album reached gold record in February 2013 after selling more than 7,500 copies.

In January 2012, Mañalac joined ASAP as a mainstay cast and a performer in the show.

On February 10, 2013, during an appearance on the last episode of Sarah G. Live, Bamboo Mañalac hinted that he would be working with Sarah Geronimo after they both finished performing a production number together. On February 14, 2013, ABS-CBN aired a promotional plug during the airtime of the pre-primetime television drama Kahit Konting Pagtingin, confirming Bamboo Mañalac's stint in The Voice of the Philippines as coach and judge. In an interview made by ABS-CBN News, Mañalac provided a statement regarding his stint on the show, "I'm ready to be a coach. There's a time for everything and this is it." When asked on what kind of artist will he would like to coach, he said, "I’ve been listening to rock for a long time but I also listen to other genres from rock to pop to folk to everything. I want someone who is open to all kinds of music; someone who is willing to listen and willing to learn."

Bamboo, alongside Sarah Geronimo, and Lea Salonga returned as coaches for The Voice Kids Philippines from 2014 to present.

In October 2015, four years after the release of his first album, Bamboo released his second solo album entitled Bless this Mess. The 10-track album was recorded in Grand Street Recording Studio, Brooklyn, New York.

== Personal life ==
Mañalac is married and has kids, including a son named Lucius. Mañalac is evasive when it comes to his personal life.

== Discography ==
Solo albums

- No Water, No Moon (2012)
- Bless This Mess (2015)

with Bamboo

- As the Music Plays (2004)
- Light Peace Love (2005)
- We Stand Alone Together (2007)
- Tomorrow Becomes Yesterday (2008)

with Rivermaya

- Rivermaya (1994)
- Trip (1996)
- Atomic Bomb (1997)

== Filmography ==
List of television performances
Year	Title	Role	Network
2011–present	ASAP Natin To!	Himself	ABS-CBN; Kapamilya Channel
2013	My Myx	Himself	Myx
2013	Backtrax	Himself	Myx
2013	Rock Myx	Himself	Myx
2013	Pinoy Myx	Himself	Myx
2013	The Voice of the Philippines	Himself	ABS-CBN
2013	Kapamilya, Deal or No Deal	Himself	ABS-CBN
2014	The Voice Kids	Himself	ABS-CBN
2014	The Voice of the Philippines (season 2)	Himself	ABS-CBN
2015	The Voice Kids (Philippines season 2)	Himself	ABS-CBN
2016	The Voice Kids (Philippines season 3)	Himself	ABS-CBN
2017	The Voice Teens (Philippines season 1)	Himself	ABS-CBN
2019	The Voice Kids (Philippines season 4)	Himself	ABS-CBN
2020	The Voice Teens (Philippine season 2)	Himself	ABS-CBN
2023	The Voice Kids (Philippine season 5)	Himself	Kapamilya Channel

NOTE: This list only includes Mañalac's regular television shows. Short television guestings are not included.

== Awards ==
Year	Organisation	Award	Work	Result
2004	13th NU Rock Awards	Vocalist of the Year	Bamboo Mañalac (of Bamboo)	Won
2005	13th NU Rock Awards	Vocalist of the Year	Bamboo Mañalac (of Bamboo)	Won
2006	SOP Pasiklaband	Vocalist of the Year	Bamboo Mañalac (of Bamboo)	Won
2006	14th NU Rock Awards	Vocalist of the Year	Bamboo Mañalac (of Bamboo)	Nominated
2008	SOP Pasiklaband	Vocalist of the Year	Bamboo Mañalac (of Bamboo)	Nominated
2012	25th Awit Awards	Best Performance by a Male Recording Artist	Bamboo Mañalac (for "Questions")	Won
2014	Myx Music Awards 2014	Favorite Male Artist	Bamboo Mañalac	Won
2014	Myx Music Awards 2014	Favorite Rock Video	Bamboo Mañalac (for "Carousel")	Won
2014	Myx Music Awards 2014	Favorite Media Soundtrack	Bamboo Mañalac (for "Carousel")	Won
2016	Myx Music Awards 2016	Favorite Song	Bamboo Mañalac (for "Firepower")	Nominated
