= Charlie Green (singer) =

English-Filipino singer

- Born: Charlie Green (Note: Charlie Green was born in the United Kingdom. Thus, he does not possess his mother's maiden name which is Sumargo.)
- Origin: Droitwich, Worcestershire, England
- Genres: Jazz, pop, swing, adult contemporary
- Occupations: Singer, actor
- Instruments: Vocals, piano, trumpet, cornet, bass guitar
- Years active: 1999-present
- Labels: Star (2008–2010); Viva (Philippines, 2010–present); Universal (Rest of Asia, 2010–present); 19 Music (2010–12)
- Website: charliegreenmusic.co.uk

Charlie Green is an English–Filipino singer from Droitwich, Worcestershire, England. Green is best known for appearing on the second series of Britain's Got Talent in 2008. After the show, Green signed a record deal with Star Records and released his debut album, Charlie Green. He has since toured the U.S. and embarked on promotional tours in Asia. In February 2010, Green signed a two-year recording contract and agency with Viva Records. Green toured various countries to promote the album.

== Early life and singing career ==
Green was born in Droitwich, Worcestershire to Roger Green who is English and Cecilia Sumargo who is a Filipina. He first performed in front of an audience at the age of 2 on a cruise ship. He asked for the microphone, got on stage and sang New York City and when he was 5, he performed at the Royal Opera House. When Green was 8, he was invited, by the 'Not Forgotten' Association for ex-servicemen, to perform at their annual concert at St James' Palace. The highlight of his day was being presented to the Princess Royal. In fall 2007, Cedric Whitehouse produced the song "Hands Around the World" for Green which was used to raise money and increase awareness of muscular dystrophy. The song topped the chart of iTunes during the Christmas holidays, and is also featured on his debut album.

=== 2008: Britain's Got Talent ===
In his audition, which was televised on 19 April 2008, Green sang Frank Sinatra's "Summer Wind," and received a standing ovation from the audience. Amanda Holden predicted he could win the show. Simon Cowell gave highly positive comments, dubbing Green 'a little star'. Piers Morgan said Green "has it all". He received three yes votes from the judges. Eventually, he was put through to the live shows.

Green performed for a second time during the semi-final on 28 May 2008, singing an original song written for him called All I Wanna Do Is Sing. His overall presentation received mixed reviews from all three judges. Although Green was highly praised for his performance, with comments coming from Piers Morgan stating, "Everything about you says you're a young star," to Holden's, "You're such a pro. And you have a wonderful wonderful voice", his non-standard song choice was unanimously criticized. Simon Cowell in particular commented that the song was "terrible", but went on to say that he would rate Green's performance as a 10, and his song choice as a 2.

Streetdancer George Sampson finished first according to the public vote, leaving the judges to choose between Green and martial arts duo Strike. Although Cowell acknowledged that Green was hampered by his song choice, he thought that he had high potential to win, so he chose Green. Both Amanda Holden and Piers Morgan selected Strike instead thus eliminating Green from the competition.

Cedric Whitehouse (who wrote the song) subsequently received hate mail from angry fans who claimed he ruined Green's career. He later revealed that the production company originally intended for Green to sing Dean Martin's "Ain't That A Kick In The Head?".

After the show, negotiations for Simon Cowell's record label failed and Green instead signed a 1-year recording contract with record label Star Records, and released his eponymous debut album, Charlie Green in the fall of 2008.

=== 2008–2010: Post Talent ===
Since Britain's Got Talent, Green has appeared in some of the UK's premier concert venues including the Bridgewater Hall, Manchester, Fairfield Hall, Croydon, and twice at Birmingham's Symphony Hall.

In the summer of 2008 Green embarked on a two-week promotional tour during which he appeared as a guest in Pinoy Dream Academy and ASAP and received an award for his talents at the 20th anniversary celebrations of the National Music Museum together with Charice. He stayed at the Shangri-la hotel in Manila where he gave a concert on 9 August 2008. Green signed up with Star Magic released his debut album, Charlie Green under Star Records in Autumn 2008.

In December 2008 Green visited the Philippines again. During this trip he performed at a family party of former president Joseph Estrada. He sang a duet with him: "Dahil Sa Iyo". He attended the party together with his parents; his mother is a family friend of the Estradas. He was featured in a single page of the 2009 Star Magic Catalogue. He also appeared in the first major mainstream magic show in the Philippines on 27 December with a group of magicians called "The Illusive".

Green made his acting debut in the 2008 short film "Waiting in Rhyme". The film's dialog consisted entirely of poetry and was made in aid of Macmillan Cancer Support. Green played the role of a bullied boy and did his performance in rap.

In March 2009, Green embarked on a US tour in a bid for world stardom. The tour began on 12 March and lasted until the end of April. Green appeared in 14 major cities including Los Angeles, Las Vegas, Chicago and San Francisco. He was also singled out to appear on one of the USA's most prestigious daytime TV shows. In October Green visited the US and Canada for a brief concert tour before flying to the Philippines at the beginning of November, for a special guest appearance on Sarah Geronimo's new show at the Araneta Coliseum in Manila.

=== 2010–present: Second album ===
In January, Green attended the Awit Awards, and won 3 awards – Best Performance by a New Male Artiste and Best Performance by a Child Artiste for his performance of Summer Wind on Britain's Got Talent. He won the Best Jazz Recording Award for his performance of Mama Said So, by Richard Poon. Green, however, because of commitments in the UK, was not present at the ceremony to collect his awards.

On 3 February 2010, it was reported that Green had signed a 2-year contract with Viva Records, and has begun recording his second album with record producer Christian de Walden. Green began recording the album on 3 February. The album was composed of 12 to 13 tracks, 2 of which are original songs while some are American Songbook classics. Green toured various countries to promote the album. The music video for the single Liquid Ice was directed by British director Leon Mitchell the video featured actor James Davies, who played Chase in the television series Power Ranger Dino Charge

Green, whose showbiz career used to be handled by Star Magic, spoke about why he chose to sign with Viva Records. "I had a good time [with Star Magic]. But something has changed over years so we decided to go with Viva. The contract with Star Records was only one year anyway, so it's either we stay or go to Viva." I toured with Sarah [Geronimo] last year, so I went to America, Canada ... so I was all around the world. It was quite nice, it's quite good, especially at my age. I'm really lucky and I'm so thankful that I was able to do those sort of things."

Green had a series of concerts to promote the album, with the following dates: Eastwood City, Quezon City on 10 February, McKinley Hill, Taguig on 12 February.

== Personal life ==
Green attended Westacre Middle School in Droitwich, Worcestershire.

== Discography ==
=== Albums ===
Year	Album	Peak chart positions	
Year	Album	UK	IRE
2008	Charlie Green: Released: November 2008; Labels: Star Records	–	–
2010	A Friend Like You: Released: 9 May 2010; Labels: Viva Records	–	–
2012	Rainbow: Released: February 2012; Labels: Viva Records	–	–

=== Singles ===
Year	Single	Chart positions		Album
Year	Single	UK	IRE	Album
2007	"Hands Around The World"	–	–	Non-Album Single
