= Bless This Mess (Bamboo Mañalac album) =

Studio album by Bamboo Mañalac
- Released: October 30, 2015
- Recorded: Grand Street Recording Studios
- Languages: English, Filipino
- Label: PolyEast

Bamboo Mañalac chronology
No Water, No Moon (2011)	Bless This Mess (2015)

Bless This Mess is the second studio album by Bamboo Mañalac. Its lead single is "Firepower".

"Firepower" debuted at number one on Myx charts. The second release, "Nothing Like You", peaked at number 9 on Pinoy Myx Countdown and number 13 on Myx Hit Chart. "C@ll", the album's third release, premiered on New Year's Day 2017 on Myx. It peaked at number 2 on Myx Daily Top 10: Pinoy Edition (as of January 6, 2017) and number 3 on Pinoy Myx Countdown (as of January 7, 2017).

== Track listing ==
All tracks are written by Bamboo Mañalac, except Track 4 & 10 written by Kakoy Legaspi.

No.	Title	Length
1.	"Nothing Like You"	5:23
2.	"Firepower"	3:27
3.	"C@ll"	4:18
4.	"Lingering Love"	5:18
5.	"I Want It All"	3:02
6.	"Mr. Wang"	3:15
7.	"Last Dance"	4:58
8.	"Untitled"	4:06
9.	"Fire"	5:05
10.	"Anak Ng OPM Blues (Bonus Track)"	5:19

== Personnel ==
- Bamboo Mañalac - vocals
- Ria Osorio - piano, keyboard, orchestrator
- Kakoy Legaspi - guitars
- Junjun Regalado - drums
- Simon Tan - bass guitar
- Bong Gonzales - guitars

== Album Credits ==
- All Songs are written by Bamboo except track 4 & 10 written by Kakoy Legaspi
- Recorded at Grand Street Recording Studios
- Tracked and Mixed by: Jake Lummus
- Mastered by: Fred Kevorkian
- Album Packaging: Will Monzon
