= Paco Arespacochaga =

- Born: Enrico Luis Victor Santos Arespacochaga; 21 July 1971 (age 55)
- Origin: Manila, Philippines
- Genres: OPM, rock, pop
- Occupations: Musician, songwriter
- Instruments: Drums, guitar, vocals
- Years active: 1986–present
- Label: 2Heaven Music
- Member of: Introvoys
- Formerly of: Mystery, Skin
- Spouses: Geneva Cruz (m. 1995; ann. 2001) Janelle Aguirre (m. 2001)

Enrico Luis Victor "Paco" Santos Arespacochaga (born 21 July 1971) is a Filipino musician and songwriter. He is the drummer of the Filipino pop-rock band Introvoys. Aside from receiving several gold and multi-platinum awards, he has also received the Guillermo Mendoza Award. Since 1995, he has been a Zildjian endorser.

== Career ==
=== Introvoys (1986–1996) ===
In 1986, Arespacochaga became one of the founding members of Introvoys along with 3rd-G Cristobal and Jonathan Buencamino. Introvoys albums shot to quadruple platinum status earning the band the label "the No. 1 Band in the Land!". In 1994 they released an album, Line to Heaven, in which Paco sang the title song which he had composed after losing both his parents. In 1996, Arespacochaga left the band.

=== Mystery (1997–2000) ===
Arespacochaga formed Mystery in 1997. The line up was Marvin Yrastorza on vocals, Joseph Cruz on keyboards, G3 Misa on guitar, Mark Cruz on bass and Paco on drums. The band disbanded after three years. They released the album Jigsaw under Star Records.

=== Skin (2000–2001) ===
Arespacochaga formed Skin in 2000. The line up was Norby David on vocals, Jonathan Manuel on guitar, Henry Abesamis on keyboards, and Paco on drums.

=== Solo album (2000) ===
In 2000, Arespacochaga released his solo album entitled Rebirth.

=== Introvoys (2001–present) ===
Arespacochaga reunited with Introvoys and they had a US tour. After the tour, he decided to migrate to Los Angeles, California as did the rest of the band. Their single "Nasaan Ka?" was released in June 2014.

== Personal life ==
Arespacochaga married fellow singer Geneva Cruz but both later annulled their marriage. They had one child, a son, Heaven. He is married to Janelle Aguirre and they currently reside in California with their children.
