= Geneva Cruz =

Filipino actress and singer

- Born: Geneva Mendoza Cruz; April 2, 1976 (age 50)
- Origin: Tondo, Manila, Philippines
- Genres: OPM; pop
- Occupations: Singer, songwriter, dancer, actress, model
- Instruments: Vocals, guitar
- Years active: 1989–present
- Formerly of: Smokey Mountain
- Spouses: Paco Arespacochaga (m. 1995; ann. 2001) KC Montero (m. 2004; div. 2012)
- Relatives: Sheryl Cruz (cousin); Donna Cruz (cousin); Sunshine Cruz (cousin); Rayver Cruz (cousin); Rodjun Cruz (cousin); Tirso Cruz III (uncle); Ricky Belmonte (uncle)
- Military career
- Allegiance: Philippines
- Branch: Philippine Air Force; Air Force Reserve Command
- Service years: 2023–present
- Rank: Sergeant

Geneva Mendoza Cruz (Tagalog pronunciation: [ˈkɾus]; born April 2, 1976) is a Multiplatinum Filipino singer and actress known for her songs "Anak ng Pasig" ("Child of Pasig River") and "Kailan" ("When"). She was discovered and mentored by National Artist of the Philippines for Music, Ryan Cayabyab who formed the music group Smokey Mountain, of which she was a member. In 2020, Cruz moved back to Manila in the Philippines, from the United States, where she worked as a weight-loss coach for a few years.

On March 9, 2022, Cruz earned the rank of sergeant under the Philippine Air Force Reserve Command after she graduated from its military training.

== Early life ==
Geneva Mendoza Cruz was born in Gagalangin, Tondo, Manila. One of the great-granddaughters of Tirso Cruz Sr., her relatives include actors Tirso Cruz III, Sunshine Cruz, Sheryl Cruz, and Donna Cruz.

Cruz first married Paco Arespacochaga, with whom she had a son, Heaven. After declaration of nullity, she married KC Montero. After their 10-year marriage, she dated non-showbiz partners Nikolaus Booth and Lee Paulsen, the latter of which she had a daughter, London, born on May 10, 2014. In May 2024, Cruz and Montero joined It's Showtime's "EXpecially for You".

In 2024, Cruz enrolled in the Bachelor of Business Administration course at Philippine Christian University. She studied Bachelor of Literature at the University of Santo Tomas.

== Career ==
Cruz began her career in 1989 as one of the lead singers of the vocal music group Smokey Mountain. The album Smokey Mountain went double platinum. She also represented the Philippines in 1992 at "The Voice of Asia" in Alma-Ata, Kazakhstan, Russia, where she won gold and became the Grand Champion, of which she was and still is, the youngest ever to win the title. Cruz's first solo album, I Like You, went double platinum and included several hit songs, including the title track and "Anak ng Pasig" (from the film of the same title) in which Geneva appeared. "Anak ng Pasig" was also chosen as Best Pop Song by the 1992 Catholic Mass Media Awards. Her second solo album In the Name of Love went platinum and included hits like "Ang Gaan ng Feeling" and "In the Name of Love".

Cruz's most recent album was released in August 2013 entitled To Manila. She moved back to Manila, Philippines in 2023 to pursue acting and continue performing worldwide. Aside from singing and acting, Cruz also dances and plays the guitar. In 2026, Cruz was among the 20 selected "lucky stars" in the ABS-CBN game show Kapamilya Deal or No Deal, and was chosen as a contestant in the episode aired September 5. At the end of the game, the board contained the final two amounts of ₱50 and the ₱1 million top prize, and the final banker's offer was ₱333,000. Cruz declined the final offer, and ended up winning the former amount of ₱50 for her charity.

== Personal life ==
Cruz dated former MTV VJ KC Montero in 1999 and they were married from 2004 until 2010.

On May 10, 2014, Cruz gave birth to a baby girl named London Lee Cruz (with her ex-fiancé) and is currently living in Manila, Philippines, with her. Her son Heaven Arespacochaga, with musician Paco Arespacochaga, resides in Los Angeles, California and is a rapper and songwriter that goes by the name HEAVENKNEW.

Cruz has been a long-time environmentalist and an animal rights advocate.

In 2013, Cruz joined the PETA campaign to free Mali, an elephant currently in captivity at the Manila Zoo, and have her transferred to Boon Lott's elephant sanctuary in Thailand. She posed for a photoshoot with Sanya Smith, Amanda Griffin, Ornussa Cadness, Mia Ayesa, Julia Sniegowski, Sheena Vera Cruz and Daiana Menezes, all of whom were asking for Mali to be freed.

== Filmography ==
=== Film ===
| Year | Title | Role |
|---|---|---|
| 1992 | Anak ng Pasig | |
| 1993 | Secret Love | Carmina |
| 1995 | Campus Girls | Diane |
| 1995 | I Love You Sabado | Band member |
| 2001 | Weyt a Minit, Kapeng Mainit | Joy |
| 2002 | Burles King (Daw O...)! | Jessica |
| 2002 | Walang Iba Kundi Ikaw | Abril |
| 2020 | Coming Home | |

=== Television ===
| Year | Title | Role |
|---|---|---|
| 1995–2001 | ASAP | Herself / performer / host |
| 1999–2001 | Bingo Filipino | Herself |
| 2001–2002 | Ikaw Lang ang Mamahalin | Melody |
| 2004 | Mulawin | Haraya |
| 2005 | Bubble Gang | Herself / guest |
| 2006 | Encantadia: Pag-ibig Hanggang Wakas | Sari-a |
| 2011 | PNP Pacers | |
| 2011 | Survivor Philippines: Celebrity Showdown | Castaway |
| 2020 | I Can See Your Voice (season 2) | Guest singer / contestant |
| 2020 | I Can See Your Voice (season 3) | Guest singer / contestant (with Jeffrey Hidalgo) |
| 2021 | Your Face Sounds Familiar (season 3) | Herself / contestant |
| 2022 | Little Princess | Odessa Hidalgo-Montivano |
| 2022 | Tadhana: The Stepdaughter | Betty |
| 2022 | Wish Ko Lang: Tita | Matet |
| 2022 | Tadhana: Isabella | Elvira Reyes |
| 2023 | Wish Ko Lang: Lihim ni Mister | Jenny |
| 2023 | Tadhana: Pangarap | Tessie |
| 2023 | Walang Matigas na Pulis sa Matinik na Misis | Iris "Mrs. Virus" Dehado |
| 2024 | Abot-Kamay na Pangarap | Irene Castro-Benitez |
| 2024 | Lilet Matias: Attorney-at-Law | |
| 2025 | Rainbow Rumble | Herself / contestant |
| 2026 | Born to Shine | Sugar Halari-Chua (guest cast) |
| 2026 | Kapamilya Deal or No Deal | Herself (Briefcase Number 17) / contestant |

== Discography ==
=== Albums ===
- Smokey Mountain
- I Like You
- In the Name of Love
- On Fire!
- Geneva
- To Manila

=== Singles ===
- "Sinungaling" (2021)

=== Awards ===
- Catholic Mass Media Awards – Best song for "Anak ng Pasig"
