= Tatsulok =

Filipino anti-fascist folk-rock song

Song
- Language: Filipino
- Length: 4:15
- Composer: Rom Dongeto
- Lyricist: Rom Dongeto

Music video
- Tatsulok on YouTube

"Tatsulok" (lit. 'Triangle') is a Filipino folk song originally composed by Rom Dongeto in 1989 and released in 1991 by his folk-rock trio band Buklod, which includes Noel Cabangon and Rene Boncocan. The song explains to a young man that there's an ongoing war and that the war is just the effect of a bigger problem. It tells the young man to take action and topple a pyramid upside-down to end a never-ending war between the rich and the poor.

The song was popularized in 2007 by the band Bamboo when they released their version of the song as a single from their third album We Stand Alone Together. Since the release of Bamboo's Tatsulok, the song has become the anthem of young Filipino activists.

== History ==
"Tatsulok" was originally sung in 1991 by a trio folk-rock band, Buklod, who writes and performs songs about environment, politics, and human rights. The song was written in 1989 by Rom Dongeto, during the so-called "Total War Policy" of Philippine Government, under the late President Corazon Aquino with New People's Army (NPA), the armed wing of the communist revolutionary organization, the Communist Party of the Philippines. The NPA is referenced in the song as the color "Red" (Filipino: "pula") due to association to Communism and the Philippine Government is referenced as the color "Yellow" (Filipino: "dilaw"), being the color that Aquino is known for.

The song explains that the armed conflict between the NPA and the Philippine Government under Aquino Administration is just the effect of a bigger problem. To fully understand, before Aquino came into office, Philippines was on a nine year Martial Law under late President Ferdinand Marcos. And NPA was one of the groups that helped toppled Marcos, vacating the seat which Aquino later took when she was inaugurated on February 25, 1986. So the war of the NPA with the previous Marcos administration of Philippine Government simply continued under Aquino administration, thus the "never-ending war".

== Other versions ==
In 2007, a now-defunct Filipino rock band, Bamboo released their third album, We Stand Alone Together, with their version of "Tatsulok" as the carrier single. The song topped the Philippine Music charts breathing new life to the song.

In 2018, Buklod re-released the song on their new album which marked the band's three decades since formation in 1987.

In 2020, Filipino folk-pop band, Ben&Ben, performed a ballad rendition of the song on their BBTV episode on August 12, 2020.
