= Bamboo (Filipino band) =

Filipino alternative rock band

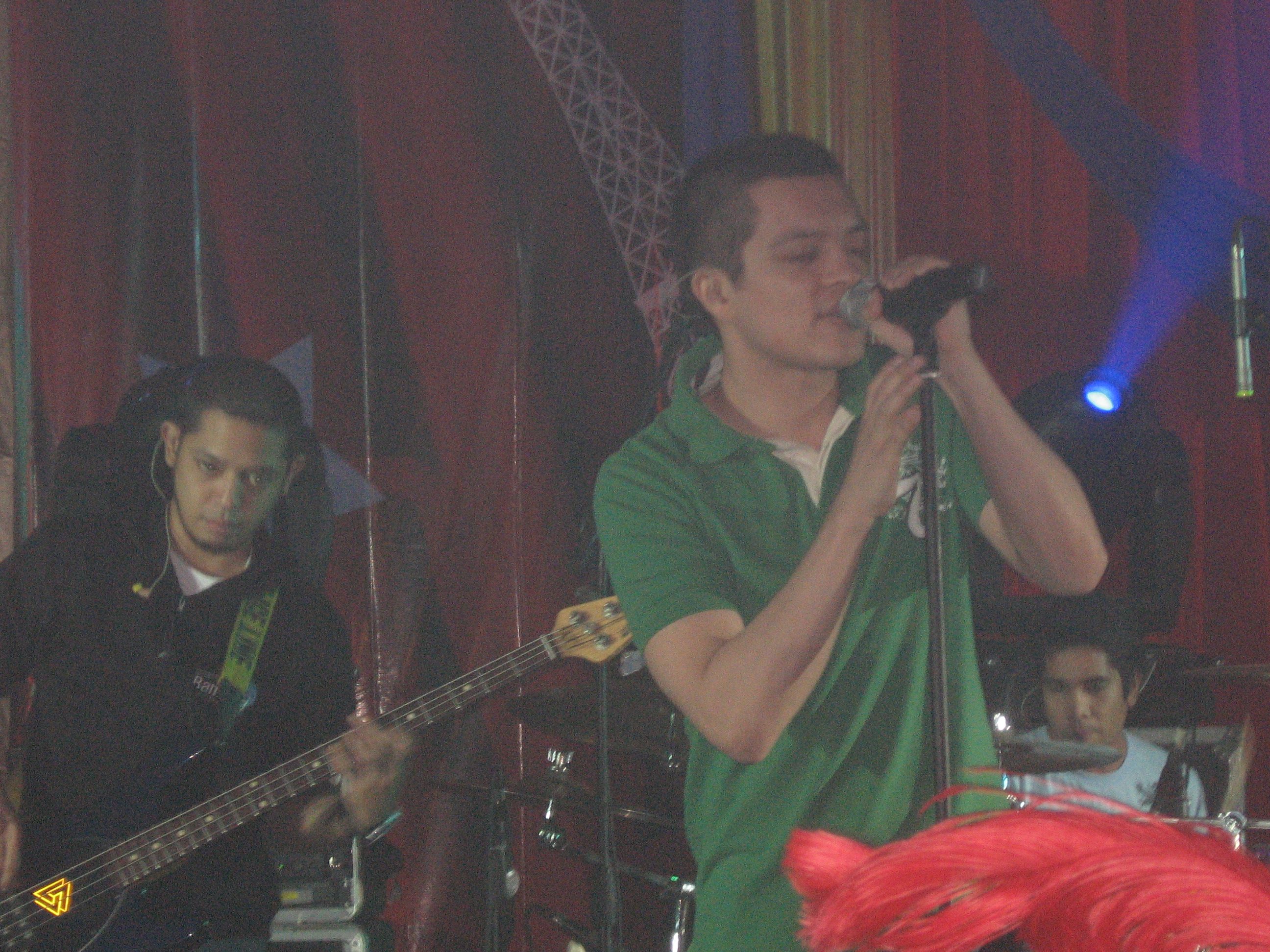
- Bamboo during a live performance. From left: Bassist Nathan Azarcon, vocalist Bamboo Mañalac, and drummer Vic Mercado.

Background information
- Origin: Metro Manila, Philippines
- Genres: Alternative rock; hard rock; pop rock; jazz fusion
- Years active: 2003–2011
- Label: EMI/PolyEast
- Past members: Bamboo Mañalac; Nathan Azarcon; Ira Cruz; Vic Mercado
- Website: bamboo.com.ph

Bamboo was a Filipino alternative rock band formed in 2003 by Nathan Azarcon and Bamboo Mañalac. The band was composed of lead vocalist Mañalac, bassist Azarcon, lead and rhythm guitarist Ira Cruz, and drummer Vic Mercado.

== History ==
=== Band formation ===
Francisco "Bamboo" Mañalac serves as the band's frontman. Ira Cruz, the band's guitarist claimed that the name of the band was not just derived from their vocalist's name but also from the word bamboo, the characteristics of which are associated with strength and durability with an island feel to it. Also, it's very Filipino and Asian at the same time, and coincidentally happens to be Mañalac's nickname.

Two of its members, Bamboo Mañalac and Nathan Azarcon, were formerly part of Rivermaya. The other two members, Ira Cruz and Vic Mercado, were former instrumentalists of another band, Passage. Cruz and Azarcon were also former members of the band Kapatid during that time.

Four years after their departure from Rivermaya, Mañalac and Azarcon caught up again with each other, during which Azarcon introduced him to Cruz and Mercado.

=== 2004–2006 ===
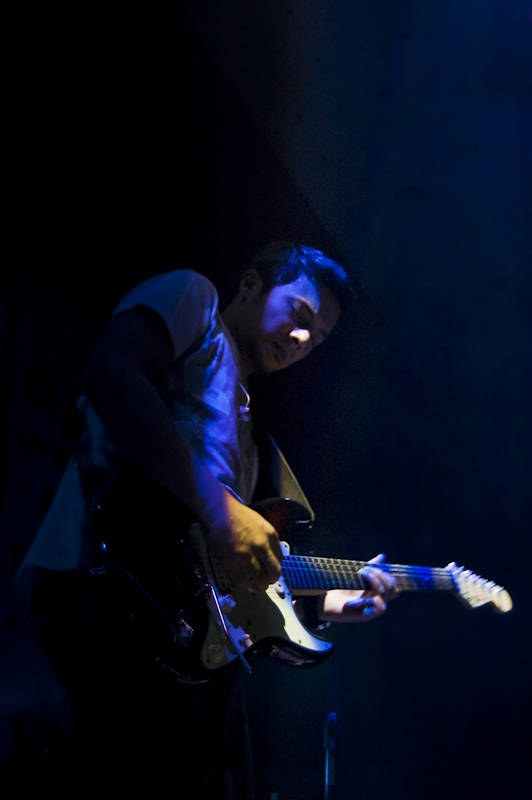
Lead guitarist Ira Cruz

Bamboo's debut album, As The Music Plays, was released in February 2004, where it received positive response from fans and critics alike. The album also won numerous awards at the AWIT Awards, NU 107 Rock Awards, and MTV Pilipinas 2004. and a repackaged version release on October 25, 2004.

Their second album, Light Peace Love, which was released on June 4, 2005, consists of ten songs with differing moods and subjects, and took only 3 months to record. This album has a softer sound with both its lyrics and delivery. For this album, the band added a variety of more instruments, including strings and trumpets. The band admitted that this album had a personal feel to it. They experimented with several new styles that may please new listeners, at the risk of disappointing fans of the more conventional rock of their first album.

On 2005, the band represented the Philippines at the EMI Music Southeast Asia three-day annual regional conference in Singapore

=== 2007–2008 ===
Their third album, We Stand Alone Together, was released on February 16, 2007. It contains covers of local songs such as Buklod's "Tatsulok" and international songs such as Paul Simon's 50 Ways to Leave Your Lover, from different generations. It also includes bonus tracks like unplugged versions of their hit songs from previous albums such as "Mr. Clay", "These Days", and "Hallelujah". Once again, opting to do away with the conventional rock image that was attached to them, they produced sounds which were more jazzy than expected.

Star Music—backed up by ABS-CBN and MYX—produced and created the official soundtrack for the tele-epiko "Rounin", wherein the title track "Argos" was performed by Bamboo. A new avenue was opened to the band, as "Argos" is said to be the band's first venture to record a song for a primetime television show. It is also the first time for the multi-awarded band and Star Music to work together. The band was also part of the "Days of Peace" Campaign by UNICEF with Gary Valenciano.

The band's fourth album, Tomorrow Becomes Yesterday achieved platinum status on September 28, 2008 - just two days after its release. In 2010, they released the repackaged version of the album, containing a DVD of the music videos for its singles.

== Break-up and aftermath ==
=== Disbandment ===
News circulated on January 9, 2011, that Bamboo had "allegedly disbanded". DJ KC Montero of Wave 89.1 confirmed the breakup on Wave's The KC Show and via Twitter. Montero clarified that all the members of the band "have decided to move on," and that he does not know why they called it quits. The group has not released an official statement on the issue, according to ABS-CBNNews.com. On January 11, 2011, Bamboo's lead vocalist Francisco "Bamboo" Mañalac finally confirmed the breakup of his band in an official statement posted on the group's website.

=== Reformation as Hijo without Bamboo ===
A few months after the band disbanded, the group reformed without the vocalist (Bamboo Mañalac) and formed the band Hijo composed of Nathan Azarcon (vocals & bass), Ira Cruz (guitar), Vic Mercado (drums), Junji Lerma of Wahijuara (guitar) and Jay-O Orduña of Cauio (keyboards and backing vocals).

The band's frontman Bamboo Mañalac pursued a solo career and released his first album as a solo artist in November 2011.

== Band members ==
- Bamboo Mañalac – vocals
- Nathan Azarcon – bass guitar, backing vocals, chief songwriter
- Ira Cruz – lead guitar, backing vocals
- Vic Mercado – drums, percussion

== Discography ==
=== Albums ===
- As The Music Plays (2004) - Double Platinum (A 2-disc Repackaged Version was released in 2004)
- Light Peace Love (2005) - Platinum
- We Stand Alone Together (2007) - Gold
- Tomorrow Becomes Yesterday (2008) - Platinum (A 2-disc Repackaged Version was released in late 2010)

=== Compilations ===
- Full Volume:The Best Of Pinoy Alternative (2005 Polyeast Records)

includes As The Music Plays (Jam Version)

- Rounin OST (2007 Star Music) :includes Argos
- Astig...The Biggest OPM Hits (2008 Universal Records)
- Platinum Hits Collection (2011 Polyeast Records)

=== Singles ===
Year	Single	Album
2004	Noypi	As the Music Plays
2004	Mr. Clay	As the Music Plays
2004	Masaya	As the Music Plays
2005	Hallelujah	Light Peace Love
2005	F.U.	Light Peace Love
2005	Much Has Been Said	Light Peace Love
2005	Truth	Light Peace Love
2005	Peace Man	Light Peace Love
2006	Argos	Rounin OST
2007	Tatsulok	We Stand Alone Together
2007	Probinsyana	We Stand Alone Together
2007	So Far Away	We Stand Alone Together
2008	Kailan	Tomorrow Becomes Yesterday
2009	Last Days on a Cruise Ship	Tomorrow Becomes Yesterday
2009	Muli	Tomorrow Becomes Yesterday
2010	Kalayaan	Tomorrow Becomes Yesterday
2010	Bagong Sigaw	Tomorrow Becomes Yesterday

== Awards and nominations ==
Year	Award giving body	Category	Nominated work	Results
2004	89.9 TM Year End Awards	Song of the Year	"Masaya"	Won
2004	89.9 TM Year End Awards	New Local Artist	—N/a	Won
2004	93.1 RX Year End Awards	Song of the Year	"Noypi"	Won
2004	93.1 RX Year End Awards	New Local Artist of the Year	—N/a	Won
2004	93.1 RX Year End Awards	Group of the Year	—N/a	Won
2004	MTV Pilipinas Music Awards	Favorite New Artist in a Video	"Noypi"	Won
2004	MTV Pilipinas Music Awards	Favorite Song	"Noypi"	Won
2004	MTV Pilipinas Music Awards	Favorite Group Video	"Noypi"	Won
2004	MTV Pilipinas Music Awards	Guitarist of the Year	(for Ira Cruz)	Won
2004	NU Rock Awards	Artist of the Year	—N/a	Won
2004	NU Rock Awards	Song of the Year	"Noypi"	Won
2004	NU Rock Awards	Vocalist of the Year	(for Bamboo Mañalac)	Won
2004	NU Rock Awards	Drummer of the Year	(for Vic Mercado)	Won
2004	NU Rock Awards	Listener's Choice	—N/a	Won
2005	89.9 TM Year End Awards	Song of the Year	"Noypi"	Won
2005	Awit Awards	Best Performance by a New Group Recording Artist	"Noypi"	Won
2005	Awit Awards	Best Rock Recording	"Noypi"	Won
2005	Awit Awards	People's Choice Favorite Song	"Noypi"	Won
2005	MTV Pilipinas Music Awards	MTV Ayos! Best Commercial Video	"Fiestamazing"	Won
2005	MTV Pilipinas Music Awards	Favorite Group Video	"Masaya"	Nominated
2005	NU Rock Awards	Album of the Year	"Light Peace Love"	Won
2005	NU Rock Awards	Vocalist of the Year	(for Bamboo Mañalac)	Won
2005	NU Rock Awards	Listener's Choice	—N/a	Won
2005	NU Rock Awards	Guitarist of the Year	(for Ira Cruz)	Nominated
2005	NU Rock Awards	Bassist of the Year	(for Nathan Azarcon)	Nominated
2005	NU Rock Awards	Drummer of the Year	(for Vic Mercado)	Nominated
2005	NU Rock Awards	Best Live Act	—N/a	Nominated
2005	NU Rock Awards	Song of the Year	"Hallelujah"	Nominated
2005	NU Rock Awards	Best Male Award	(for Bamboo Mañalac)	Nominated
2005	NU Rock Awards	Artist of the Year	—N/a	Nominated
2005	NU Rock Awards	Music Video of the Year	"Hallelujah"	Nominated
2005	SOP Music Awards	Strictly Alternative	"Hallelujah"	Won
2006	Aliw Awards	Most Promising Entertainer	—N/a	Won
2006	Aliw Awards	Best Major Concert(Group)	—N/a	Won
2006	Awit Awards	Best Performance by a New Group Recording Artist	"Hallelujah"	Won
2006	Awit Awards	Album of the Year	"Light Peace Love"	Won
2006	Awit Awards	Song of the Year	"Hallelujah"	Won
2006	Awit Awards	Best Ballad Recording	"Much Has Been Said"	Won
2006	Awit Awards	Best Rock Recording	"Hallelujah"	Won
2006	Awit Awards	People's Choice Favorite Song	"Hallelujah"	Won
2006	MTV Pilipinas Music Awards	Best Cinematography in a Video	"Much Has Been Said"	Won
2006	MTV Pilipinas Music Awards	Favorite Group Video	"Much Has Been Said"	Nominated
2006	MTV Pilipinas Music Awards	Favorite Pop Video	"Much Has Been Said"	Nominated
2006	MTV Pilipinas Music Awards	Best Production in a Video	"Much Has Been Said"	Nominated
2006	MYX Music Awards	Favorite Artist	—N/a	Nominated
2006	MYX Music Awards	Favorite Song	"Hallelujah"	Nominated
2006	MYX Music Awards	Favorite Group	—N/a	Nominated
2006	MYX Music Awards	Favorite Rock Video	"Hallelujah"	Nominated
2006	MYX Music Awards	Favorite MYX Live Performance	—N/a	Nominated
2006	NU Rock Awards	Best Male Award	(for Bamboo Mañalac)	Nominated
2006	SOP Pasiklaband	Best Rock Band	—N/a	Won
2006	SOP Pasiklaband	Vocalist of the Year	(for Bamboo Mañalac)	Won
2006	The 2bU! Click Awards	Most Clickable Band	—N/a	Won
2007	GMMSF Box-Office Entertainment Awards	Most Popular Recording Group	—N/a	Won
2007	NU Rock Awards	Artist of the Year	—N/a	Won
2007	NU Rock Awards	Guitarist of the Year	(for Ira Cruz)	Won
2007	NU Rock Awards	Bassist of the Year	(for Nathan Azarcon)	Won
2007	NU Rock Awards	Drummer of the Year	(for Vic Mercado)	Won
2007	NU Rock Awards	Listener's Choice	—N/a	Won
2007	NU Rock Awards	Best Live Act	—N/a	Won
2007	NU Rock Awards	Vocalist of the Year	(for Bamboo Mañalac)	Nominated
2007	NU Rock Awards	Song of the Year	"Tatsulok"	Nominated
2007	NU Rock Awards	Album of the Year	"We Stand Alone Together"	Nominated
2007	NU Rock Awards	Producer of the Year	with Angee Rozul for "We Stand Alone Together"	Nominated
2007	NU Rock Awards	Best Music Video	"Probinsyana"	Nominated
2008	Awit Awards	Best Rock Recording	"Tatsulok"	Won
2008	Awit Awards	Best Performance by a Group Recording Artist (Performance Award)	"Tatsulok"	Won
2008	Awit Awards	Best Musical Arrangement	"Probinsyana"	Won
2008	Awit Awards	Best Engineered Recording	"Probinsyana"	Won
2008	Awit Awards	Music Video of the Year	"Probinsyana"	Won
2008	Awit Awards	Best Performance by a Group Recording Artist (Performance Award)	"Argos"	Nominated
2008	Awit Awards	Best Performance by a Group Recording Artist (People's Choice Award)	"Argos"	Nominated
2008	Awit Awards	Best Performance by a Group Recording Artist (People's Choice Award)	"Tatsulok"	Nominated
2008	Awit Awards	Best Rock Recording	"Argos"	Nominated
2008	Awit Awards	Best Rock Recording	"Probinsyana"	Nominated
2008	Awit Awards	Best Song Written for Movie/TV/Stage Play	"Argos" (from Rounin)	Nominated
2008	Awit Awards	Music Video of the Year	"So Far Away"	Nominated
2008	Awit Awards	Music Video of the Year (People's Choice Award)	"Probinsyana"	Nominated
2008	Awit Awards	Music Video of the Year (People's Choice Award)	"So Far Away"	Nominated
2008	GMMSF Box-Office Entertainment Awards	Most Popular Recording Group	—N/a	Won
2008	MYX Music Awards	Favorite Music Video	"Probinsyana"	Nominated
2008	MYX Music Awards	Favorite Group	—N/a	Nominated
2008	MYX Music Awards	Favorite Remake	"Tatsulok"	Nominated
2008	MYX Music Awards	Favorite Rock Video	"Tatsulok"	Nominated
2009	NU Rock Awards	Music Video of the Year	"Last Days on a Cruise Ship"	Won
2009	Philippine Radio Music Awards	International Artist	—N/a	Won
2010	GMMSF Box-Office Entertainment Awards	Group Recording Artist/Performer of the Year	—N/a	Won

== Other media ==
=== Commercial endorsements ===
- Smart
- Nescafé
- Colt 45
- Pepsi
- Yamaha Motors
- Tanduay Rhum T5 (with 6cyclemind, Chicosci, Kamikazee, and Sandwich)
