= Kanta Pilipinas =

Philippine television reality show

- Title card
- Genre: Reality
- Created by: Futuretainment Inc. TV5
- Developed by: Futuretainment Inc.
- Directed by: GB Sampedro
- Creative director: Jimmy Antiporda
- Presented by: Rico Blanco
- Judges: Ryan Cayabyab; Lani Misalucha; Rico Blanco
- Opening theme: "Kanta Pilipinas" by Lea Salonga
- Country of origin: Philippines
- Original language: Tagalog
- No. of episodes: 8

Production
- Running time: 60 minutes
- Production companies: Futuretainment Inc. Cignal Entertainment

Original release
- Network: TV5
- Release: February 9 – March 24, 2013

Related
- Talentadong Pinoy

Kanta Pilipinas (lit. 'Sing Philippines') is a Philippine television reality competition show broadcast by TV5. Hosted by Rico Blanco, it aired from February 9 to March 24, 2013, replacing Talentadong Pinoy and was replaced by Boracay Bodies.

== Overview ==
The show is produced by TV5 and Futurentertainment Inc., owned by Marvin Agustin.

=== Format ===
Kanta Pilipinas is a reality singing competition. It was open to Filipino males and females, whether solo, duo, trio or group of singers with a maximum of five members. From the initial number of auditionees who passed the regional auditions, 24 of them will proceed to the final auditions round. From the top 24 auditionees, 12 are then selected to become the top 12 finalists whom will then compete for the vetted position of the first ever winner of Kanta Pilipinas, and of the grand prize of 1 million pesos, a recording and management contract from TV5.

=== Judges and hosts ===
Lea Salonga and Sharon Cuneta were rumored to host Kanta Pilipinas. Cuneta formerly hosted Star Power, a singing competition aired on ABS-CBN. However, TV5 and people behind the show failed to comment on the rumors. Salonga was eventually selected to sing the theme song of the show.

In January 2013, it was announced that Rico Blanco will host the show. It was also revealed in January 2013 that Ryan Cayabyab, Lani Misalucha and Rico Blanco, the show's host, will serve as the judging panel.

== Selection process ==
=== Auditions ===
Cities where the auditions were held.

Auditions took place in the following locations:

Date	Venue	City
February 24, 2012	SM City Cagayan de Oro	Cagayan de Oro
March 2, 2012	SM City Cebu	Cebu
March 10, 2012	SM City Davao	Davao City
March 16, 2012	SM City Baguio	Baguio
March 23, 2012	SM City Iloilo	Iloilo
March 30, 2012	SM City North EDSA	Quezon City
April 20, 2012	SM City Batangas	Batangas City

=== Online auditions ===
Online auditions also took place from February to June 2012.

=== Top 24 auditionees ===
Before the show aired on February 9, 2013, the top 24 auditionees were already announced. In the final auditions, each auditionee must present themselves and sing their final audition songs. From the top 24 auditionees, 12 finalists will advance for the semifinals and compete for the grand prize.

The following are the top 24 auditionees:

The Top 24 auditionees of Kanta Pilipinas
Solo	Adrian Tabaldo; Allan Gonzales; Allison Gonzales; Chadleen Lacdo-o; Dea Formilleza; Esther Martinez; Ferns Tosco; Giancarlo Baldonido; Gregory Llamoso; Haizel Fernando; Isaiah Antonio; Jacob Gayanelo; Janeth Gomez; Jeniffer Maravilla; Pia Diamante; Raz Mendoza; Ricky Deloviar; Roshelle Soledad; Thara Jordana; Timothy Pavino; Zari Bilon
Duos	Daniel and JB (composed of Daniel Grospe and JB Landrito); Carlo and Nicole (composed of Carlo and Nicole David)
Groups	5az1 (composed by Bryann Foronda, Ghielan Rex Flores, Herbert Kho, Jr., John Maynard Aisa, and Mick Pronteras)

=== Final auditions ===
The top 24 auditionees were divided into 4 batches. 1 batch composed of 6 hopefuls will perform in front of the judges and the audience per episode.

The series of results of the final auditions is divided into two parts. The first results were aired on February 16, 2013 after 12 of the top 24 auditionees had already performed; the second results will be aired on March 2, 2013, wherein half of the remaining auditionees will be eliminated and the other half, whom will complete the top 12, will advanced for the semifinal rounds.

Vehnee Saturno served as a guest judge for the whole duration of the final auditions.

Episode	Order	Name	Age, Hometown	Song (Original artist)	Result
February 9, 2013 (Batch 1)	1.1	Timmy Pavino	23, Parañaque	"Go the Distance" (Michael Bolton)	Advanced
February 9, 2013 (Batch 1)	1.2	Thara Therese Jordana	22, Metro Manila	"The Only Exception" (Paramore)	Advanced
February 9, 2013 (Batch 1)	1.3	Janeth Gomez	17, Quezon City	"On My Own" (Nikka Costa)	Eliminated
February 9, 2013 (Batch 1)	1.4	5az1	20 – 26, Metro Manila	"More than This" (One Direction)	Advanced
February 9, 2013 (Batch 1)	1.5	Giancarlo Baldonido	26, Sampaloc, Manila	"I'll Never Say Goodbye" (Melissa Manchester)	Eliminated
February 9, 2013 (Batch 1)	1.6	Carlo & Nicole	24 & 26, Quezon City	"Always" (Atlantic Starr)	Advanced
February 16, 2013 (Batch 2)	2.1	Dea Formilleza	18, Compostela Valley	"Don't Know Why" (Norah Jones)	Advanced
February 16, 2013 (Batch 2)	2.2	Adrian Tabaldo	26, California, United States	"If I Ain't Got You" (Alicia Keys)	Eliminated
February 16, 2013 (Batch 2)	2.3	Haizel Fernando	20, Makati	"California King Bed" (Rihanna)	Eliminated
February 16, 2013 (Batch 2)	2.4	Zari Bilon	18, Bacoor, Cavite	"You and I" (Lady Gaga)	Eliminated
February 16, 2013 (Batch 2)	2.5	Isaiah Antonio	22, Manila	"She Will Be Loved" (Maroon 5)	Eliminated
February 16, 2013 (Batch 2)	2.6	Allan Gonzales	26, Quezon City	"Ikaw Lamang" (Ogie Alcasid)	Advanced
February 23, 2013 (Batch 3)	3.1	Chadleen Lacdo-o	17, Cebu City	"Beautiful" (Christina Aguilera)	Advanced
February 23, 2013 (Batch 3)	3.2	Daniel and JB	22 & 24, Las Piñas	"Man in the Mirror" (Michael Jackson)	Advanced
February 23, 2013 (Batch 3)	3.3	Pia Diamante	19, Naga, Camarines Sur	"I'm with You" (Avril Lavigne)	Advanced
February 23, 2013 (Batch 3)	3.4	Esther Martinez	17, Surigao City	"Lipad Ng Pangarap" (Dessa)	Eliminated
February 23, 2013 (Batch 3)	3.5	Raz Mendoza	21, Valenzuela City	"Get Here" (Oleta Adams)	Eliminated
February 23, 2013 (Batch 3)	3.6	Jacob Gayanelo	20, Parañaque	"Broken Vow" (Lara Fabian)	Eliminated
March 2, 2013 (Batch 4)	4.1	Jeniffer Maravilla	19, San Pedro, Laguna	"Habang May Buhay" (AfterImage)	Advanced
March 2, 2013 (Batch 4)	4.2	Ricky Deloviar	23, Iloilo City	"Goodbye" (Air Supply)	Advanced
March 2, 2013 (Batch 4)	4.3	Gregory Llamoso	25, Lucena City, Quezon	"Saving All My Love for You" (Whitney Houston)	Eliminated
March 2, 2013 (Batch 4)	4.4	Allison Gonzales	20, Quezon City	"Only Hope" (Switchfoot)	Eliminated
March 2, 2013 (Batch 4)	4.5	Roshelle Soledad	23, Marilao, Bulacan	"I Need You" (LeAnn Rimes)	Eliminated
March 2, 2013 (Batch 4)	4.6	Ferns Tosco	26, Boracay Island, Aklan	"Island Called Boracay" (Ferns Tosco)	Advanced

== Finalists ==
Finalists
Males	Timmy Pavino	Allan Gonzales	Ricky Deloviar
Females	Thara Therese Jordana	Dea Formilleza	Pia Diamante
Females	Chadleen Lacdo-o	Jennifer Maravilla	Ferns Tosco
Duos and groups	5az1	Carlo and Nicole	JB and Daniel

== Results summary ==
Color keys

- – Winner
- – Runner-up
- – Part of the bottom group but still safe from elimination
- – Part of a bottom group
- – Eliminated at the Finals
- – Automatically eliminated
- – Eliminated

Weekly results per contestant
Contestants	Week 1	Week 2	Week 3	Week 4: Finals	
Contestants	Week 1	Week 2	Week 3	Round 1	Round 2
Chadleen Lacdo-o	Safe	Bottom seven	Safe	Safe	Winner
Jeniffer Maravilla	Safe	Safe	Safe	Safe	Runner-up
Ricky Deloviar	Safe	Safe	Safe	Eliminated	Eliminated (Week 4)
Thara Jordana	Safe	Bottom seven	Safe	Eliminated	Eliminated (Week 4)
Carlo and Nicole	Safe	Safe	Eliminated	Eliminated (Week 3)	
Ferns Tosco	Bottom four	Bottom four	Eliminated	Eliminated (Week 3)	
Pia Diamante	Safe	Safe	Eliminated	Eliminated (Week 3)	
Timmy Pavino	Safe	Bottom seven	Eliminated	Eliminated (Week 3)	
5az1	Safe	Bottom four	Eliminated (Week 2)		
Daniel and JB	Bottom four	Bottom four	Eliminated (Week 2)		
Allan Gonzales	Bottom four	Bottom four	Eliminated (Week 2)		
Dea Formilleza	Bottom four	Eliminated (Week 1)			

== Weekly performances ==
=== Week 1 (March 9) ===
- Challenge: Group performances
- Guest mentor & judge: Noel Cabangon

Group	Order	Contestant	Song (Original artist)	Result
Group 1	1	Daniel & JB	"Kahit Maputi Na Ang Buhok Ko" (Sharon Cuneta) "Kasama Kang Tumanda" (Toni Gonzaga)	Bottom four
Group 1	1	Dea Formilleza	"Kahit Maputi Na Ang Buhok Ko" (Sharon Cuneta) "Kasama Kang Tumanda" (Toni Gonzaga)	Bottom four
Group 1	1	Allan Gonzales	"Kahit Maputi Na Ang Buhok Ko" (Sharon Cuneta) "Kasama Kang Tumanda" (Toni Gonzaga)	Bottom four
Group 1	1	Ferns Tosco	"Kahit Maputi Na Ang Buhok Ko" (Sharon Cuneta) "Kasama Kang Tumanda" (Toni Gonzaga)	Bottom four
Group 2	2	5az1	"Bulong" (Kitchie Nadal) "Pagsubok" (Orient Pearl)	Safe
Group 2	2	Ricky Deloviar	"Bulong" (Kitchie Nadal) "Pagsubok" (Orient Pearl)	Safe
Group 2	2	Pia Diamante	"Bulong" (Kitchie Nadal) "Pagsubok" (Orient Pearl)	Safe
Group 2	2	Thara Therese Jordana	"Bulong" (Kitchie Nadal) "Pagsubok" (Orient Pearl)	Safe
Group 3	3	Carlo & Nicole	"Hanggang" (Wency Cornejo) "Ngayon" (Basil Valdez)	Safe
Group 3	3	Chadleen Lacdo-o	"Hanggang" (Wency Cornejo) "Ngayon" (Basil Valdez)	Safe
Group 3	3	Jeniffer Maravilla	"Hanggang" (Wency Cornejo) "Ngayon" (Basil Valdez)	Safe
Group 3	3	Timmy Pavino	"Hanggang" (Wency Cornejo) "Ngayon" (Basil Valdez)	Safe
Sagip round (Final performance)
Group 1	1	Ferns Tosco	"Tao" (Sampaguita)	Safe
Group 1	2	Allan Gonzales	"Imagine" (John Lennon)	Safe
Group 1	3	Daniel & JB	"This Love" (Maroon 5)	Safe
Group 1	4	Dea Formilleza	"Huwag na Huwag Mong Sasabihin" (Kitchie Nadal)	Eliminated

=== Week 2 (March 16) ===
- Challenge: Group performances
- Guest mentor: Jamie Rivera

Group	Order	Contestant	Song (Original artist)	Result
Aegis group	1	Carlo & Nicole	"Halik" & "Sinta" (Aegis)	Safe
Aegis group	1	Pia Diamante	"Halik" & "Sinta" (Aegis)	Safe
Aegis group	1	Ricky Deloviar	"Halik" & "Sinta" (Aegis)	Safe
Aegis group	1	Jeniffer Maravilla	"Halik" & "Sinta" (Aegis)	Safe
Willie Revillame group	2	Chadleen Lacdo-o	"Ikaw Na Nga" & "I Love You" (Willie Revillame)	Bottom seven
Willie Revillame group	2	Allan Gonzales	"Ikaw Na Nga" & "I Love You" (Willie Revillame)	Bottom four
Willie Revillame group	2	Timmy Pavino	"Ikaw Na Nga" & "I Love You" (Willie Revillame)	Bottom seven
Willie Revillame group	2	5az1	"Ikaw Na Nga" & "I Love You" (Willie Revillame)	Bottom four
Gloc-9 group	3	Daniel & JB	"Hari Ng Tondo" & "Sirena" (Gloc-9)	Bottom four
Gloc-9 group	3	Thara Therese Jordana	"Hari Ng Tondo" & "Sirena" (Gloc-9)	Bottom seven
Gloc-9 group	3	Ferns Tosco	"Hari Ng Tondo" & "Sirena" (Gloc-9)	Bottom four
Sagip round (Final performance)
Gloc-9 group	1	Daniel & JB	"Ipagpatawad Mo" (Janno Gibbs)	Eliminated
Willie Revillame group	2	5az1	"All Out of Love" (Air Supply)	Eliminated
Gloc-9 group	3	Ferns Tosco	"Dito pa rin Ako" (Ferns Tosco)	Safe
Willie Revillame group	4	Allan Gonzales	"Just the Way You Are" (Bruno Mars)	Eliminated

The Aegis group was announced Safe, while the Willie Revillame and Gloc-9 groups became the two bottom groups. From the two bottom groups, the four weakest contestants (2 from each groups) performed in the Sagip round.

=== Week 3 (March 23) ===
- Challenge: Sing-off performances

Contestant	Order	Song (Original artist)	Result
Pia Diamante	1	"Survivor" (Destiny's Child)	Eliminated
Thara Therese Jordana	1	"Survivor" (Destiny's Child)	Safe
Chadleen Lacdo-o	2	"'Di Bale Na Lang" (Gary Valenciano)	Safe
Carlo & Nicole	2	"'Di Bale Na Lang" (Gary Valenciano)	Eliminated
Timmy Pavino	3	"Whenever You Call" (Mariah Carey)	Eliminated
Jeniffer Maravilla	3	"Whenever You Call" (Mariah Carey)	Safe
Ferns Tosco	4	"Nosi Ba Lasi" (Sampaguita)	Eliminated
Ricky Deloviar	4	"Nosi Ba Lasi" (Sampaguita)	Safe

Note that, during this week, the contestants were grouped in pairs. The designated pair of contestants battled in a sing-off wherein the weaker contestant in each pair would be automatically be eliminated. There is no Sagip round held this week.

=== Finals (March 24) ===
- Challenge: Duet and solo performances
- Celebrity performers: Lea Salonga performed "Kanta Pilipinas theme song" together with the top 12 finalists
- Group performance: "Kanta Pilipinas theme song" with Lea Salonga along with the other eliminated top 8 finalists
- Debut performances: Thara Therese Jordana performed "The Only Exception"; Chadleen Lacdo-o performed "Beautiful"; Jeniffer Maravilla performed "Habang May Buhay"; Ricky Deloviar performed "Goodbye"

Contestant	Order	Duet round		Order	Solo round	Results
Contestant	Order	First song (Original artist)	Duet with	Order	Second song (Original artist)	Results
Chadleen Lacdo-o	1	"Ewan" (APO Hiking Society)	Aia De Leon	1	"Himala" (Rivermaya)	Winner
Jeniffer Maravilla	2	"Foolish Heart" (Steve Perry)	Nina	2	"Someone Who Believes in You" (Russell Hitchcock)	Runner-up
Thara Therese Jordana	3	"Upuan" (Gloc-9)	Gloc-9	3	"Skyscraper" (Demi Lovato)	Eliminated
Ricky Deloviar	4	"Luha" (Aegis)	Aegis	4	"Maghintay Ka Lamang" (Ted Ito)	Eliminated
