= The Voice of the Philippines season 2 =

The Voice of the Philippines
- Season 2
- Hosted by: Toni Gonzaga; Luis Manzano
- Coaches: apl.de.ap; Lea Salonga; Sarah Geronimo; Bamboo Mañalac
- Winner: Jason Dy
- Winning coach: Sarah Geronimo
- Runner-up: Alisah Bonaobra
- Finals venue: Newport Performing Arts Theater, Resorts World Manila, Newport City, Pasay

Release
- Original network: ABS-CBN; The Filipino Channel (International broadcaster)
- Original release: October 26, 2014 – March 8, 2015

Season chronology
- ← Previous; Season 1

The second season of The Voice of the Philippines was a reality singing competition in ABS-CBN which started airing on October 26, 2014. apl.de.ap, Lea Salonga, Sarah Geronimo, and Bamboo Mañalac returned as coaches for this season. Toni Gonzaga also returned to host the show; she was also joined by The Voice Kids host, Luis Manzano. Robi Domingo and Alex Gonzaga also returned to reprise their roles as the show's V-reporters.

The show aired every Saturdays 8:45 p.m. (PST) and Sundays at 8:30 p.m. (PST).

On March 8, 2015, Jason Dy of Team Sarah won the competition, beating Alisah Bonaobra of Team apl.

== Development ==
=== Coaches and hosts ===
The coaches of the second season of The Voice of the Philippines

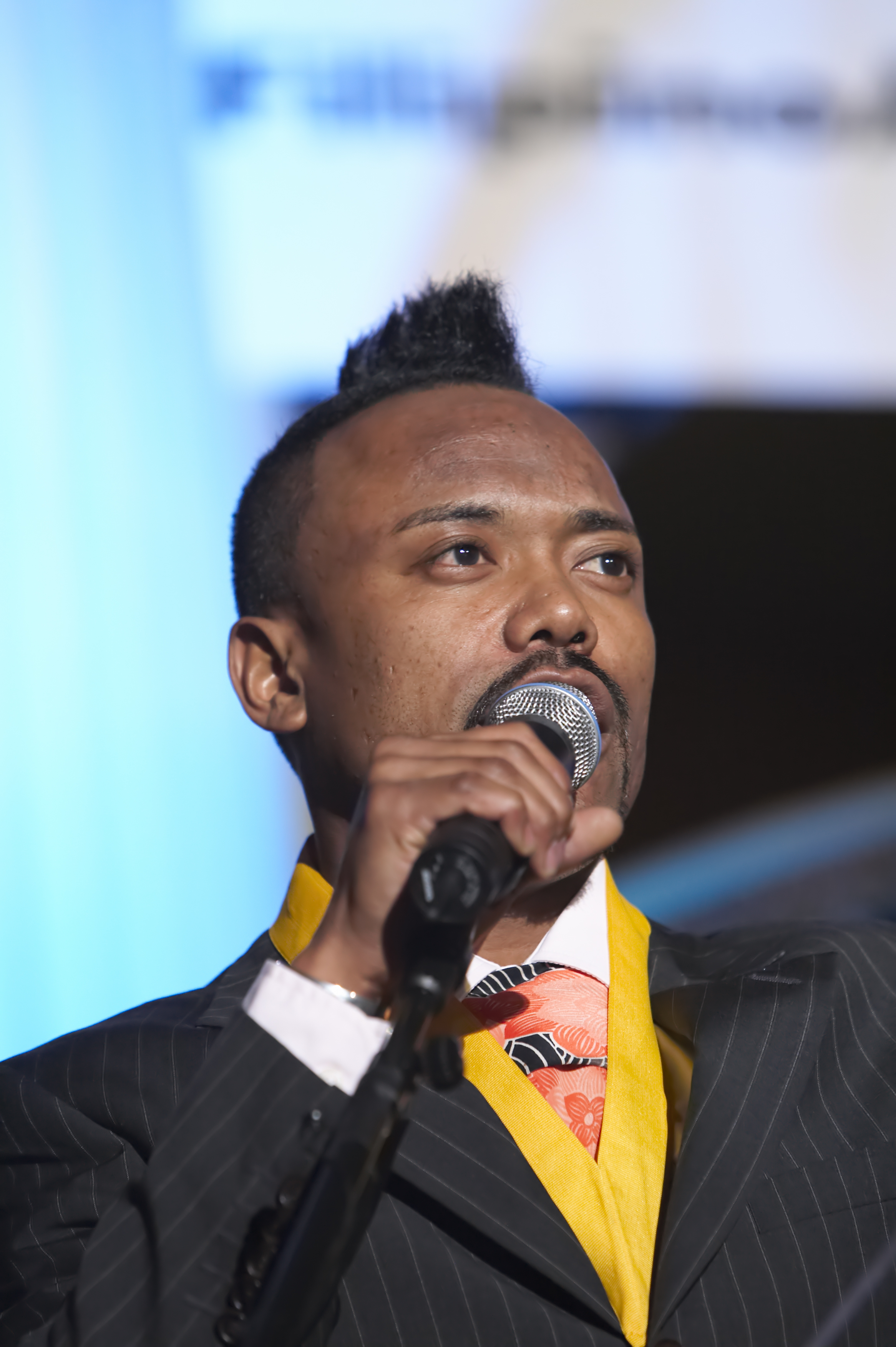
apl.de.ap

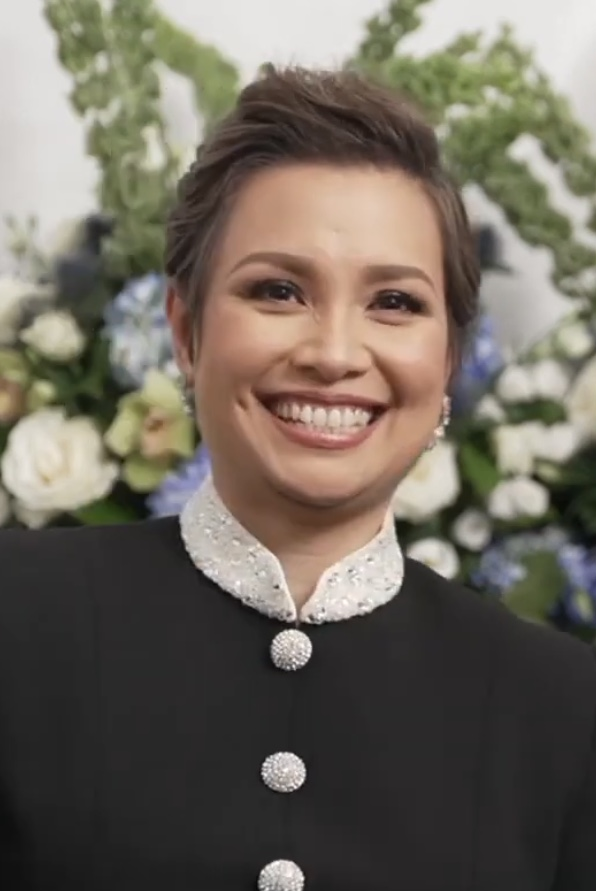
Lea Salonga

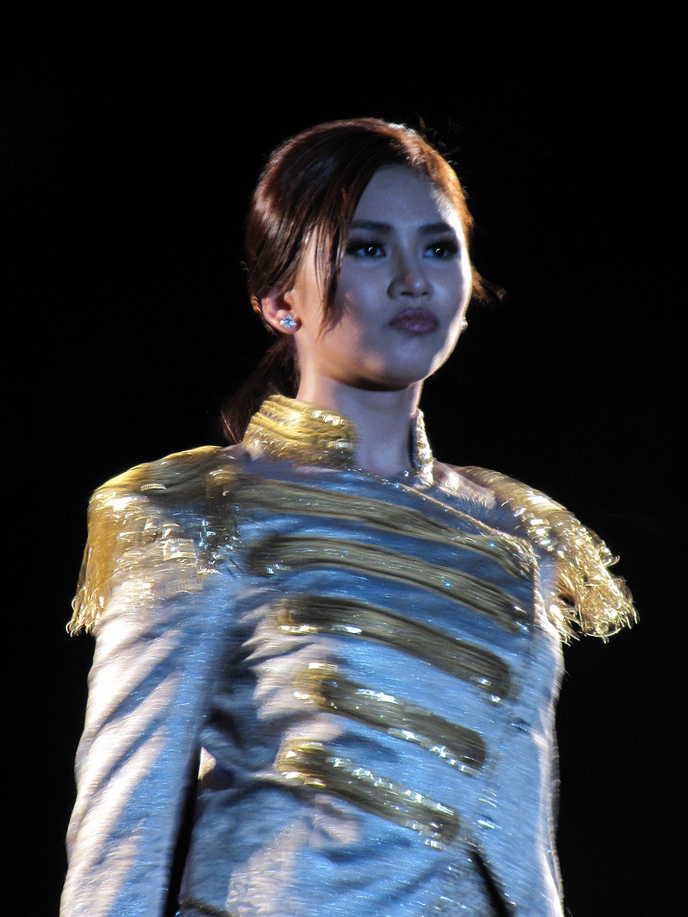
Sarah Geronimo

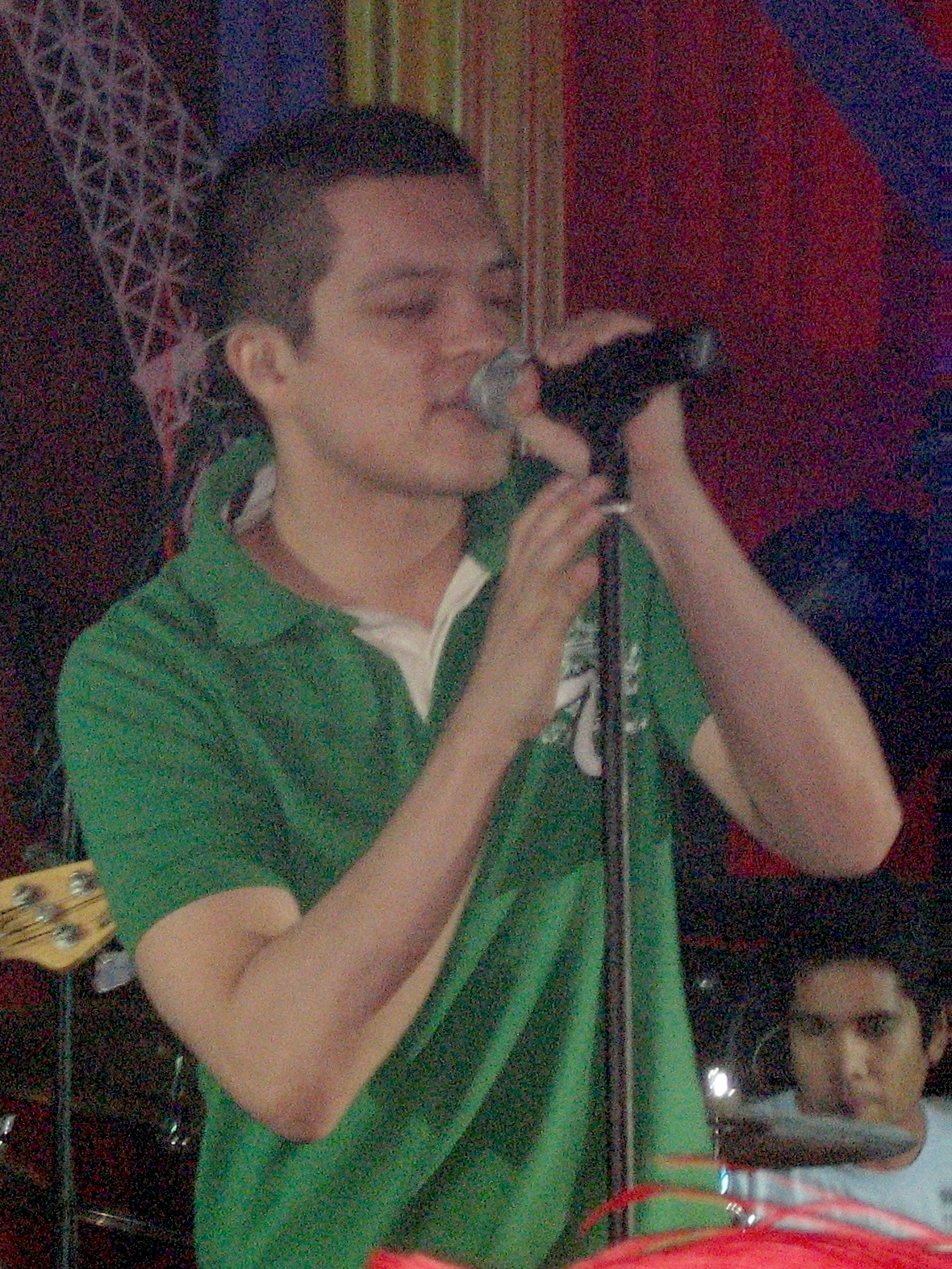
Bamboo Mañalac

Sarah Geronimo confirmed that she had a hard time working as a coach during the first season, but she confirmed that she was still willing to work as a coach for the second season. On December 16, 2013, it was announced that Geronimo signed an exclusive contract with ABS-CBN for two years. Part of her contract was her stint as a coach for the second season. Lea Salonga also expressed that she wanted to return as a coach for the second season. However, depended on her schedule. "I want to do it again. I would be defending. I kind of would love to stay but then there are external forces that are no longer in my control. There's my schedule, there's a call of Broadway and there's a call of other things. It was magical the first season because all of the stars aligned perfectly," said Salonga. On January 15, 2014 interview by Push, Salonga confirmed her return as coach in the show. "The Voice is coming back. I mean first it's okay to announce it, I have not been given the go ahead yet to say anything yet but I am certainly coming back so my chair is going to turning again for people so I am excited," she said. Salonga also confirmed that there were rumors that apl.de.ap will not return to the show. She commented, "As for Season 2, I have no idea what the plans are for Apl if he is going to return, I hope he does because over the first season the four of us have developed a really nice rapport and banter and chemistry and it would be nice to pick up where we left off rather than start over but those things are not up to me. So I am only hoping that he returns for Season 2 if he doesn't we hope we find somebody who will be able to fit the chair and be able to keep up with us because the three of us are on, it is so on, it is just the trash talking begins." It was noted that near the end of the first season, apl.de.ap along with Bamboo Mañalac had expressed their intentions to return for the second season. On March 20, 2014, the Sun Star Manila confirmed the return of all coaches for the second season. On June 12, 2014 interview by MJ Filipe of ABS-CBN News, apl confirmed his return for the second season.

Toni Gonzaga also returned as the host. On April 15, 2014, Domingo confirmed his return for the second season. By September of the same year, Alex Gonzaga was confirmed to return while Luis Manzano was added as T. Gonzaga's co-host.

=== Prizes ===
The winner of the second season of the franchise won a trophy designed by Leeroy New, a house and lot worth 2 million pesos from Camella Homes, a business package from Brother Philippines worth 1 million pesos, a shopping spree and an Asian tour package for two from Jag worth 350 thousand pesos, a brand new Ford Fiesta, a musical instrument package worth 100 thousand pesos, an MCA Universal recording contract, and 2 million pesos from Systema Toothpaste.

=== Broadcast ===
An air date of November 15, 2014 was first reported by Salonga; however, it was pushed to October 26, 2014, three weeks earlier than the initial air date. Its first two episodes aired only on Sundays. Starting on November 8, the show aired every Saturdays and Sundays — completely occupying the weekend time slots of I Do.

=== Auditions ===
Cities in the Philippines where the auditions for the second season of The Voice of the Philippines were held.

The show was renewed for a second season after it garnered immense popularity and high television ratings. ABS-CBN later announced that auditions for January 2014 for the Luzon, Metro Manila, Visayas, and Mindanao regions together with the auditions for the first season of The Voice Kids. Online auditions were slated for summer 2014, but were pushed to June 2014.

On-ground auditions of The Voice of the Philippines
Date	Location	Venue	Source
January 12, 2014	Dumaguete, Negros Oriental	Robinsons Place Dumaguete	
January 12, 2014	Roxas, Capiz	Capiz Gym Villareal Stadium	
January 19, 2014	Cagayan de Oro	SM City Cagayan de Oro	
January 19, 2014	General Santos	KCC Mall of General Santos	
January 26, 2014	Pasay	Resorts World Manila	
January 26, 2014	Manila	Lucky Chinatown Mall	
February 2, 2014	Lucena, Quezon	Pacific Mall	
February 2, 2014	Dagupan	CSI Stadia	
June 8, 2014	Taguig	Market! Market! Activity Center	
June 11, 2014	Davao City	Apo View Hotel	
June 28, 2014	Cordova, Cebu	Alta Cebu Resort and Convention Center	
June 29, 2014	Mandaue, Cebu	Pacific Mall	
July 3 & 4, 2014	Bacolod, Negros Occidental	Robinsons Place Bacolod	
July 5 & 6, 2014	Puerto Princesa, Palawan	Robinsons Place Palawan	
July 6, 2014	Legazpi, Albay	Pacific Mall	
August 16, 2014	Tagbilaran, Bohol	Island City Mall	
August 17, 2014	Quezon City	ABS-CBN Broadcasting Center	

== Teams ==
Color key

- Winner
- Runner-up
- Third place
- Fourth place
- Eliminated in the Live shows
- Eliminated in the Knockouts
- Stolen in the Battles
- Eliminated in the Battles
- Withdrew

Coaches	Top 56 artists			
apl.de.ap				
apl.de.ap	Alisah Bonaobra	Daryl Ong	Mackie Cao	Suy Galvez
apl.de.ap	Bradley Holmes	Ferns Tosco	Jannet Cadayona	Mark Cando
apl.de.ap	Patricia Gomez	~~Abbey Pineda~~	~~Jason Fernandez~~	~~Arnee Hidalgo~~
apl.de.ap	Krystina Ng	Samantha Felizco	Mecerdita Quiachon	Mark Angelo Avila
Lea Salonga				
Lea Salonga	Leah Patricio	Timmy Pavino	Nino Alejandro	Miro Valera
Lea Salonga	Casper Blancaflor	Abbey Pineda	Jem Cubil	Mic Llave
Lea Salonga	Charlie Catbagan	Julienne Cañeda	Christelle Tiquis	Emil Sinagpulo
Lea Salonga	Thara Jordana	Karl Tanhueco	Humfrey Nicasio	Philippe Go
Sarah Geronimo				
Sarah Geronimo	Jason Dy	Monique Lualhati	Kokoi Baldo	Jason Fernandez
Sarah Geronimo	Douglas Dagal	Poppert Bernadas	Shaira Cervancia	Carol Leus
Sarah Geronimo	Demie Fresco	~~Elmerjun Hilario~~	Rizza Cabrera	Vanessa Monot
Sarah Geronimo	Rosalyn Navarro	Jireh Singson	Shaira Opsimar	Daniel Ombao
Bamboo Mañalac				
Bamboo Mañalac	Rence Rapanot	Rita Martinez	Tanya Diaz	Kai Honasan
Bamboo Mañalac	Arnee Hidalgo	Karlo Mojica	Lougee Basabas	Elmerjun Hilario
Bamboo Mañalac	Joniver Robles	~~Shaira Cervancia~~	~~Casper Blancaflor~~	~~Patricia Gomez~~
Bamboo Mañalac	~~Suy Galvez~~	Sean Oquendo	Dang Del Rosario	Ramonne Rodriquez
Note: Italicized names are stolen artists (names struck through within former teams).

== Blind auditions ==
Lea Salonga wrote in the Philippine Daily Inquirer that blind auditions were t be filmed by June, but they were moved to September 7 to 10 of the same year. At the end of the blind auditions, each team had 14 artists.

A week prior to the start of the first episode, several teasers were aired. Two were blind auditions teasers wherein two female contestants sang their respective audition piece.

The blind auditions first aired on October 26, 2014. and ended on November 30, 2014 after 10 episodes.

Color key

✔	Coach hit his/her "I WANT YOU" button
	Artist defaulted to this coach's team
	Artist elected to join this coach's team
	Artist eliminated with no coach pressing his or her "I WANT YOU" button

=== Episode 1 (October 26) ===
The first episode had an opening performance of the coaches. Sarah Geronimo and Lea Salonga sang "Run the World" by Beyoncé, and were followed by Bamboo Mañalac and apl.de.ap who sang "Ten Feet Tall" by Afrojack. All then performed a mash-up of the two songs.

Order	Artist	Age	Hometown	Song	Coach's and artist's choices			
Order	Artist	Age	Hometown	Song	apl.de.ap	Lea	Sarah	Bamboo
1	Timmy Pavino	24	Seattle, Washington, United States	"You Are My Song"	—	✔	✔	✔
2	Tanya Diaz	27	Mandaluyong	"What About Love"	✔	✔	✔	✔
3	Bryan Babor	20	Dumaguete, Negros Oriental	"The Scientist"	—	—	—	—
4	Jannet Cadayona	40	Marabut, Samar	"Tukso"	✔	—	—	—
5	Kokoi Baldo	35	Bacolod, Negros Occidental	"One Day"	✔	✔	✔	✔

=== Episode 2 (November 2) ===
Order	Artist	Age	Hometown	Song	Coach's and artist's choices			
Order	Artist	Age	Hometown	Song	apl.de.ap	Lea	Sarah	Bamboo
1	Mark Cando	24	Quezon City	"Get Here"	✔	—	—	—
2	Kai Honasan	25	Marikina	"Teenage Dream"	✔	✔	✔	✔
3	Daniel Ombao	17	Mariveles, Bataan	"Tadhana"	—	—	✔	—
4	Karlo Mojica	35	Makati	"Bulag, Pipi at Bingi"	✔	—	—	✔
5	Katherine dela Cruz	22	Bay Area, California, United States	"All of Me"	—	—	—	—
6	Bradley Holmes	31	Quezon City	"Long Train Runnin'"	✔	✔	✔	—

=== Episode 3 (November 8) ===
Order	Artist	Age	Hometown	Song	Coach's and artist's choices			
Order	Artist	Age	Hometown	Song	apl.de.ap	Lea	Sarah	Bamboo
1	Dorica Carla Puno	30	Taguig City	"American Boy"	—	—	—	—
2	Juan Rocho Puno	28	Las Piñas	"Every Breath You Take"	—	—	—	—
3	Demie Fresco	16	Tacurong, Sultan Kudarat	"Ikaw"	✔	—	✔	✔
4	Vanessa Monot	25	Paris, France	"Pangarap Lang"	—	—	✔	—
5	Rence Rapanot	21	Cavinti, Laguna	"Mateo Singko"	✔	✔	✔	✔
6	Jem Cubil	20	Cebu City	"Use Somebody"	✔	✔	—	—
7	Karla Estrada	39	Quezon City	"What's Up?"	—	—	—	—

=== Episode 4 (November 9) ===
Order	Artist	Age	Hometown	Song	Coach's and artist's choices			
Order	Artist	Age	Hometown	Song	apl.de.ap	Lea	Sarah	Bamboo
1	Rhoda del Rosario	30	Bulacan	"Araw Gabi"	—	✔	—	✔
2	Leah Patricio	35	Tondo, Manila	"I Will Always Love You"	—	✔	✔	—
3	Miro Valera	35	Quezon City	"Ticket to Ride"	—	✔	—	✔
4	María Krista Aguilar	26	Sampaloc, Manila	"Diamonds"	—	—	—	—
5	Monique Lualhati	23	Quezon City	"When I Was Your Man"	✔	—	✔	—
6	Jerrica Santos	26	Canada	"Crazy"	—	—	—	—
7	Jason Luis	N/A	N/A	"Sunday Morning"	—	—	—	—
8	Iñigo	N/A	N/A	"Titanium"	—	—	—	—
9	Fidel Cascabel	N/A	Cebu City	"Buko"	—	—	—	—
10	Jason Dy	24	Butuan	"Stay With Me"	✔	✔	✔	—

=== Episode 5 (November 15) ===
Order	Artist	Age	Hometown	Song	Coach's and artist's choices			
Order	Artist	Age	Hometown	Song	apl.de.ap	Lea	Sarah	Bamboo
1	Ramonne Rodriquez	20	Laguna	"Wala Na Bang Pag-ibig"	—	—	—	✔
2	Samantha Felizco	19	Marikina	"Hurt"	✔	✔	—	—
3	Shaira Cervancia	19	Puerto Princesa, Palawan	"Sabihin"	—	—	✔	✔
4	Philippe Go	25	Quezon City	"Hanggang"	—	✔	—	✔
5	Musica Cristobal	27	Cavite	"Unbreak My Heart"	—	—	—	—
6	Carol Leus	24	Batangas	"Tattooed Heart"	—	—	✔	—
7	Nino Alejandro	37	BF Homes, Parañaque City	"Highway to Hell"	✔	✔	✔	✔

=== Episode 6 (November 16) ===
Order	Artist	Age	Hometown	Song	Coach's and artist's choices			
Order	Artist	Age	Hometown	Song	apl.de.ap	Lea	Sarah	Bamboo
1	Jenelyn Garcia	18	Cavite	"Kiliti"	—	—	—	—
2	Douglas Dagal	34	Quezon City	"Superstition"	—	—	✔	✔
3	Lougee Basabas	30	Las Piñas	"Strong Enough"	✔	—	—	✔
4	Mecerdita Quiachon	19	Bohol	"Listen"	✔	—	—	—
5	Liezel Quiachon	18	Bohol	"I Don't Want to Miss a Thing"	—	—	—	—
6	Charlie Catbagan	26	Guam, USA	"One Last Cry"	—	✔	✔	—
7	Christian Montañez	22	New York City, United States	"Rude"	—	—	—	—
8	Alisah Bonaobra	19	Paco, Manila	"Domino"	✔	✔	✔	—

=== Episode 7 (November 22) ===
Order	Artist	Age	Hometown	Song	Coach's and artist's choices			
Order	Artist	Age	Hometown	Song	apl.de.ap	Lea	Sarah	Bamboo
1	Elmerjun Hilario	25	Bago City, Negros Occidental	"The Sign"	—	—	✔	—
2	Christelle Tiquis	20	San Pablo City, Laguna	"Make You Feel My Love"	✔	✔	—	—
3	Ferns Tosco	28	Boracay, Aklan	"Ang Buhay Ko"	✔	✔	—	—
4	Sean Oquendo	25	General Santos	"Ako Na Lang"	—	—	—	✔
5	Patricia Gomez	21	Muntinlupa	"Hit the Road Jack"	—	—	—	✔
6	Genesis Ryan	21	Parañaque City	"Love on Top"	—	—	—	—
7	Joniver Robles	36	General Trias	"I Don't Need No Doctor"	✔	✔	✔	✔

=== Episode 8 (November 23) ===
Order	Artist	Age	Hometown	Song	Coach's and artist's choices			
Order	Artist	Age	Hometown	Song	apl.de.ap	Lea	Sarah	Bamboo
1	Shaira Opsimar	18	Davao City	"Mamma Knows Best"	—	—	✔	—
2	Mark Angelo Avila	19	Naga, Camarines Sur	"Ordinary People"	✔	—	—	—
3	Gemma Vergara	23	Pilar, Bohol	"Isang Lahi"	—	—	—	—
4	Jason Fernandez	25	Santa Rosa, Laguna	"Ang Huling El Bimbo"	✔	—	—	—
5	Thara Jordana	23	Cebu City	"We Can't Stop"	✔	✔	—	—
6	Humfrey Nicasio	24	Tagbilaran, Bohol	"Happy"	—	✔	✔	—
7	Krystina Ng	16	General Santos	"The House of the Rising Sun"	✔	—	—	—
8	Poppert Bernadas	27	Davao City	"Luha"	✔	✔	✔	✔

=== Episode 9 (November 29) ===
Order	Artist	Age	Hometown	Song	Coach's and artist's choices			
Order	Artist	Age	Hometown	Song	apl.de.ap	Lea	Sarah	Bamboo
1	Jireh Singson	21	Makati	"Makita Kang Muli"	✔	—	✔	—
2	Abbey Pineda	34	Parañaque City	"I Just Can't Stop Loving You"	✔	—	—	—
3	Rita Martinez	30	Marikina	"Sweet Child o' Mine"	—	—	—	✔
4	Karl Tanhueco	25	Angeles, Pampanga	"All of Me"	—	✔	—	—
5	Nena Zamora & Kynah Anzano	19 & 19	Bacolod, Negros Occidental	"Sino ang Baliw"	—	—	—	—
6	Rosalyn Navarro	19	Naga, Camarines Sur	"Get Here"	✔	—	✔	—
7	Renz	N/A	N/A	"Ordinary People"	—	—	—	—
8	Luise	16	N/A	"Muli"	—	—	—	—
9	Brao	N/A	N/A	"Unbreak My Heart"	—	—	—	—
10	Daryl Ong	27	Quezon City	"Paano"	✔	✔	✔	—
11	Rizza Cabrera	22	Cebu City	"Clarity"	—	—	✔	—

=== Episode 10 (November 30) ===
Order	Artist	Age	Hometown	Song	Coach's and artist's choices			
Order	Artist	Age	Hometown	Song	apl.de.ap	Lea	Sarah	Bamboo
1	Suy	33	Davao City	"What a Wonderful World"	—	—	Team full	✔
2	Mackie Cao	23	Los Baños, Laguna	"Listen"	✔	✔	Team full	—
3	Isaiah Antonio	24	Quezon City	"A Thousand Miles"	—	—	Team full	—
4	Dovie Belardo	34	TBA	"What's Up?"	—	—	Team full	—
5	Faith Cuneta	32	Pasay	"Ikaw"	—	—	Team full	—
6	Arnee Hidalgo	32	Parañaque City	"Feeling Good"	✔	—	Team full	—
7	Mic Llave	27	Quezon City	"Panalangin"	Team full	✔	Team full	—
8	Julienne Cañeda	21	Bacolod, Negros Occidental	"Hurt"	Team full	✔	Team full	✔
9	Casper Blancaflor	25	Quezon City	"Kisapmata"	Team full	✔	Team full	✔
10	Emil Sinagpulo	25	Dasmariñas, Cavite	"Who You Are"	Team full	✔	Team full	Team full

== The Battles ==
The power to steal an artist from the other teams was implemented during this season. At the end of the Battles, each coach had nine artists who advanced to the Knockouts, two of whom were stolen artists from the other teams.

The Battles opened with Lea Salonga and Bamboo Mañalac singing Stevie Wonder's "Someday at Christmas", followed by Sarah Geronimo and apl.de.ap singing Mariah Carey's "All I Want for Christmas Is You." The coaches sang ABS-CBN's Christmas Station ID's "Ang Babait Ninyo" together, originally sung by The Voice Kids top four finalists.

The first episode of the Battles aired on December 6, 2014, and the sixth and last episode aired on December 21, 2014.

Color key

Artist won the Battle and advanced to the Knockouts
Artist lost the Battle but was stolen by another coach and advanced to the Knockouts
Artist lost the Battle and was eliminated

Episode	Coach	Order	Winner	Song	Loser	'Steal' result			
Episode	Coach	Order	Winner	Song	Loser	apl	Lea	Sarah	Bamboo
Episode 11 (December 6, 2014)	Lea Salonga	1	Timmy Pavino	"Forevermore"	Philippe Go	—	N/A	—	—
Episode 11 (December 6, 2014)	Bamboo Mañalac	2	Rita Martinez	"Tainted Love"	Suy	✔	—	—	N/A
Episode 11 (December 6, 2014)	Sarah Geronimo	3	Jason Dy	"On Bended Knee"	Daniel Ombao	—	—	N/A	—
Episode 11 (December 6, 2014)	apl.de.ap	4	Bradley Holmes	"I Would Do Anything for Love"	Jason Fernandez	N/A	✔	✔	—
Episode 12 (December 7, 2014)	Sarah Geronimo	1	Monique Lualhati	"Lady Marmalade"	Shaira Opsimar	—	—	N/A	—
Episode 12 (December 7, 2014)	apl.de.ap	2	Mark Cando	"This I Promise You"	Mark Angelo Avila	N/A	—	—	—
Episode 12 (December 7, 2014)	Bamboo Mañalac	3	Lougee Basabas	"To Love Somebody"	Ramonne Rodriquez	—	—	—	N/A
Episode 12 (December 7, 2014)	Lea Salonga	4	Leah Patricio	"Forever"	Humfrey Nicasio	—	N/A	—	—
Episode 12 (December 7, 2014)	Sarah Geronimo	5	Kokoi Baldo	"To Be With You"	Elmerjun Hilario	✔	✔	N/A	✔
Episode 13 (December 13, 2014)	Lea Salonga	1	Nino Alejandro	"We Built This City"	Karl Tanhueco	—	N/A	—	—
Episode 13 (December 13, 2014)	apl.de.ap	2	Mackie Cao	"Through The Fire"	Mecerdita Quiachon	N/A	—	—	—
Episode 13 (December 13, 2014)	Sarah Geronimo	3	Demie Fresco	"Tell Him"	Rosalyn Navarro	—	—	N/A	—
Episode 13 (December 13, 2014)	Bamboo Mañalac	4	Rence Rapanot	"Creep"	Casper Blancaflor	—	✔	✔	N/A
Episode 14 (December 14, 2014)	apl.de.ap	1	Janet Cadayona	"Kung Ako'y Iiwan Mo"	Arnee	N/A	—	—	✔
Episode 14 (December 14, 2014)	Sarah Geronimo	2	Douglas Dagal	"As"	Vanessa Monot	—	—	N/A	Team full
Episode 14 (December 14, 2014)	Lea Salonga	3	Jem Cubil	"No Air"	Thara Jordana	—	N/A	—	Team full
Episode 14 (December 14, 2014)	Lea Salonga	4	Mic Llave	"More Than Words"	Emil Sinagpulo	—	—	—	Team full
Episode 14 (December 14, 2014)	Bamboo Mañalac	5	Tanya Diaz	"Banal na Aso, Santong Kabayo"	Shaira Cervancia	✔	✔	✔	Team full
Episode 15 (December 20, 2014)	Lea Salonga	1	Miro Valera	"Magkasuyo Buong Gabi"	Christelle Tiquis	—	N/A	Team full	Team full
Episode 15 (December 20, 2014)	Sarah Geronimo	2	Carol Leus	"I Don't Want to Wait"	Rizza Cabrera	—	—	Team full	Team full
Episode 15 (December 20, 2014)	apl.de.ap	3	Daryl Ong	"I Finally Found Someone"	Samantha Felizco	N/A	—	Team full	Team full
Episode 15 (December 20, 2014)	Bamboo Mañalac	4	Kai Honasan	"Somewhere Over the Rainbow"	Patricia Gomez	✔	—	Team full	Team full
Episode 15 (December 20, 2014)	Bamboo Mañalac	5	Joniver Robles	"Lean On Me"	Dang Del Rosario	Team full	—	Team full	Team full
Episode 16 (December 21, 2014)	Sarah Geronimo	1	Poppert Bernadas	"I'll Never Go"	Jireh Singson	Team full	—	Team full	Team full
Episode 16 (December 21, 2014)	Bamboo Mañalac	2	Karlo Mojica	"Rude"	Sean Oquendo	Team full	—	Team full	Team full
Episode 16 (December 21, 2014)	apl.de.ap	3	Ferns Tosco	"The Winner Takes It All"	Krystina Ng	Team full	—	Team full	Team full
Episode 16 (December 21, 2014)	Lea Salonga	4	Charlie Catbagan	"Against All Odds"	Julienne Caneda	Team full	N/A	Team full	Team full
Episode 16 (December 21, 2014)	apl.de.ap	5	Alisah Bonaobra	"Unconditionally"	Abbey Pineda	Team full	✔	Team full	Team full
Episode 17 & 18 (December 27 & 28, 2014)	The seventeenth and eighteenth episode was a special episode. It featured some of the best moments from the blind auditions, battles, and other unseen content.								

== The Knockouts ==
The Knockouts was added along with steals. Each artist had to sing and convince his/her coach in order to pick him/her up for the final line-up for the Live shows. Each team was divided into three groups of three artists, and each artist decided which song to sing. In each group, two advanced to the Live shows with the remaining one eliminated from competition.

At the end of this round, from the nine artists per team, only six artists advanced to the Live shows.

Color key

Artist won the Knockouts and advanced to the Live shows
Artist lost the Knockouts and was eliminated

Episode	Coach	Order	Song	Artists		Song
Episode	Coach	Order	Song	Winners	Loser	Song
Episode 19 & 20 (January 3 & 4, 2015)	The nineteenth and twentieth episode was a special episode. It featured the preparations of the top 36 artists for the Knockout Rounds.					
Episode 21 (January 10, 2015)	apl.de.ap	1	"Let It Be"	Ferns Tosco	Patricia Gomez	"Oo"
Episode 21 (January 10, 2015)	apl.de.ap	1	"At Last"	Suy	Patricia Gomez	"Oo"
Episode 21 (January 10, 2015)	apl.de.ap	2	"The Greatest Love of All"	Daryl Ong	Mark Cando	"Impossible Dream"
Episode 21 (January 10, 2015)	apl.de.ap	2	"Kamusta Mga Kaibigan"	Bradley Holmes	Mark Cando	"Impossible Dream"
Episode 21 (January 10, 2015)	apl.de.ap	3	"Salamat"	Mackie Cao	Jannet Cadayona	"Pusong Bato"
Episode 21 (January 10, 2015)	apl.de.ap	3	"Follow Your Dreams"	Alisah Bonaobra	Jannet Cadayona	"Pusong Bato"
Episode 22 (January 11, 2015)	Lea Salonga	1	"Narito"	Timmy Pavino	Charlie Catbagan	"Kahit Isang Saglit"
Episode 22 (January 11, 2015)	Lea Salonga	1	"Bukas Na Lang Kita Mamahalin"	Leah Patricio	Charlie Catbagan	"Kahit Isang Saglit"
Episode 22 (January 11, 2015)	Lea Salonga	2	"Bring Me To Life"	Casper Blancaflor	Mic Llave	"Anak"
Episode 22 (January 11, 2015)	Lea Salonga	2	"Love Hurts"	Nino Alejandro	Mic Llave	"Anak"
Episode 22 (January 11, 2015)	Lea Salonga	3	"'Di na Natuto"	Abbey Pineda	Jem Cubil	"Drive"
Episode 22 (January 11, 2015)	Lea Salonga	3	"Wannabe"	Miro Valera	Jem Cubil	"Drive"
Episode 23 (January 17, 2015)	Sarah Geronimo	1	"I Knew You Were Trouble"	Monique Lualhati	Demie Fresco	"My Immortal"
Episode 23 (January 17, 2015)	Sarah Geronimo	1	"Natutulog Ba Ang Diyos"	Poppert Bernadas	Demie Fresco	"My Immortal"
Episode 23 (January 17, 2015)	Sarah Geronimo	2	"Jar of Hearts"	Jason Dy	Carol Leus	"Open Arms"
Episode 23 (January 17, 2015)	Sarah Geronimo	2	"I Believe I Can Fly"	Douglas Dagal	Carol Leus	"Open Arms"
Episode 23 (January 17, 2015)	Sarah Geronimo	3	"Push"	Jason Fernandez	Shaira Cervancia	"Don't Stop Believin'"
Episode 23 (January 17, 2015)	Sarah Geronimo	3	"Bilog Na Naman ang Buwan"	Kokoi Baldo	Shaira Cervancia	"Don't Stop Believin'"
Episode 24 (January 18, 2015)	Bamboo Mañalac	1	"Usok"	Karlo Mojica	Rita Martinez^{1}	"Hit Me with Your Best Shot"
Episode 24 (January 18, 2015)	Bamboo Mañalac	1	"Himig Natin"	Joniver Robles^{1}	Rita Martinez^{1}	"Hit Me with Your Best Shot"
Episode 24 (January 18, 2015)	Bamboo Mañalac	2	"Walang Hanggang Paalam"	Rence Rapanot	Elmerjun Hilario	"Dati"
Episode 24 (January 18, 2015)	Bamboo Mañalac	2	"Limang Dipang Tao"	Kai Honasan	Elmerjun Hilario	"Dati"
Episode 24 (January 18, 2015)	Bamboo Mañalac	3	"Fallin'"	Arnee	Lougee Basabas	"Chain of Fools"
Episode 24 (January 18, 2015)	Bamboo Mañalac	3	"I Remember You"	Tanya Diaz	Lougee Basabas	"Chain of Fools"

Note

1. ^ ^{a} ^{b} Joniver Robles was able to advance to the Live shows after being picked by Bamboo during the Knockouts; Rita Martinez was eliminated. However, after the episode, Bamboo announced that Robles had to leave the competition for personal reasons. From the guidelines placed by Talpa, if an artist withdrew from the competition, the person he had last battled replaced him; in this case, the last artist Robles battled was Martinez, who was reinstated and went to the Live shows.

== Live shows ==
The Live Shows aired on January 24, 2015 at the Newport Performing Arts Theater, a theater with a capacity of 1,500 at Resorts World Manila in Newport City, Pasay, Metro Manila. It was the second time that this stage of the competition was held there. Differentiating from the first season, the live shows were aired on Saturdays and Sundays; the former was for the performance night, the latter for the results night.

The voting system was similar to the semifinals of the previous season wherein the public voted for the artist they wanted to save per team. Voting commenced after all the artists had performed and closed the following night. The accumulated public votes from the public determined the first artist to advance from each team, and their respective coaches chose the second.

For the third and fourth Live show weeks, a new voting format was formed. Each night was a performance and results night. Two teams had to perform per night. After each team had performed, the voting lines were opened and closed immediately after the commercial break. Before the night ended, one artist per team was eliminated. By the fifth week, the use of points was reinstated; half of which were from the public and half from the artist's coach. Coaches were barred from giving equal points to their respective artists.

The finale was on March 1, 2015.

Color key

Artist was saved by the public's vote
Artist was part of the bottom two in his/her team and saved by his/her coach
Artist was saved after receiving the highest accumulated coach's and public's points
Artist was eliminated

=== Week 1 (January 24 & 25) ===
Episode	Coach	Order	Artist	Song	Votes	Result
Episodes 25 & 26 (January 24 and 25, 2015)	Sarah Geronimo	1	Poppert Bernadas	"I Feel Good"	unrevealed	Eliminated
Episodes 25 & 26 (January 24 and 25, 2015)	apl.de.ap	2	Ferns Tosco	"It's a Heartache"	unrevealed	Eliminated
Episodes 25 & 26 (January 24 and 25, 2015)	Bamboo Mañalac	3	Rita Martinez	"Smells Like Teen Spirit"	unrevealed	Bamboo's choice
Episodes 25 & 26 (January 24 and 25, 2015)	Lea Salonga	4	Nino Alejandro	"Nakapagtataka"	unrevealed	Lea's choice
Episodes 25 & 26 (January 24 and 25, 2015)	Sarah Geronimo	5	Monique Lualhati	"Maging Sino Ka Man"	40.40%	Public's choice (Note: Leah Patricio was automatically saved from the nomination after she received 46.37% of the public's vote, the highest in Team Lea; in Team apl, Daryl Ong received 50.43%; in Team Sarah, Monique Lualhati received 40.40%; and in Team Bamboo, Kai Honasan received 44.71%.)
Episodes 25 & 26 (January 24 and 25, 2015)	Lea Salonga	6	Leah Patricio	"Queen of the Night"	46.37%	Public's choice
Episodes 25 & 26 (January 24 and 25, 2015)	Bamboo Mañalac	7	Kai Honasan	"Blank Space"	44.71%	Public's choice
Episodes 25 & 26 (January 24 and 25, 2015)	apl.de.ap	8	Daryl Ong	"Let's Stay Together"	50.43%	Public's choice
Episodes 25 & 26 (January 24 and 25, 2015)	Lea Salonga	9	Abbey Pineda	"Sana'y Maghintay Ang Walang Hanggan"	unrevealed	Eliminated
Episodes 25 & 26 (January 24 and 25, 2015)	apl.de.ap	10	Suy	"I Won't Give Up"	unrevealed	apl's choice
Episodes 25 & 26 (January 24 and 25, 2015)	Sarah Geronimo	11	Jason Fernandez	"Hanggang"	unrevealed	Sarah's choice
Episodes 25 & 26 (January 24 and 25, 2015)	Bamboo Mañalac	12	Karlo Mojica	"Footloose"	unrevealed	Eliminated

Non-competition Performances
Order	Performers	Song
25.1	The Voice Coaches and The Voice Top 24 Artists	"Play That Funky Music"/"Uptown Funk"
26.1	Darren Espanto	"Iisang Bangka"
26.2	Darren Espanto, Arnel Pineda, and Week 1 Performers	"Salamat"
26.3	Team Lea & Team apl's Week 2 Performers	"Lost Stars"/"She Will Be Loved"/"This Love"
26.4	Team Sarah & Team Bamboo's Week 2 Performers	"Beep Beep"/"Laklak"

=== Week 2 (January 31 & February 1) ===
After the announcement of the results of the public votes, apl.de.ap along with Abra, Loonie, Jessica Reynoso of season 1, and some artists made a tribute to the 44 members of the Philippine National Police–Special Action Force who died in a clash with members of the Moro Islamic Liberation Front and Bangsamoro Islamic Freedom Fighters.

Episode	Coach	Order	Artist	Song	Votes	Result
Episodes 27 & 28 (January 31 and February 1, 2015)	apl.de.ap	1	Mackie Cao	"Making Love Out of Nothing at All"	42.38%	Public's choice (Note: Mackie Cao was automatically saved from the nomination after she received 42.38% of the public's vote, the highest in Team apl; in Team Lea, Miro Valera received 44.49%; in Team Sarah, Kokoi Baldo received 46.81%; and in Team Bamboo, Tanya Diaz received 49.80%.)
Episodes 27 & 28 (January 31 and February 1, 2015)	Lea Salonga	2	Miro Valera	"Wake Me Up"	44.49%	Public's choice
Episodes 27 & 28 (January 31 and February 1, 2015)	Sarah Geronimo	3	Jason Dy	"Thinking Out Loud"	unrevealed	Sarah's choice
Episodes 27 & 28 (January 31 and February 1, 2015)	Bamboo Mañalac	4	Rence Rapanot	"Malayo Pa Ang Umaga"	unrevealed	Bamboo's choice
Episodes 27 & 28 (January 31 and February 1, 2015)	Sarah Geronimo	5	Douglas Dagal	"Home"	unrevealed	Eliminated
Episodes 27 & 28 (January 31 and February 1, 2015)	Lea Salonga	6	Casper Blancaflor	"Chandelier"	unrevealed	Eliminated
Episodes 27 & 28 (January 31 and February 1, 2015)	apl.de.ap	7	Bradley Holmes	"You Give Love a Bad Name"	unrevealed	Eliminated
Episodes 27 & 28 (January 31 and February 1, 2015)	Bamboo Mañalac	8	Arnee	"Crazy in Love"	unrevealed	Eliminated
Episodes 27 & 28 (January 31 and February 1, 2015)	Sarah Geronimo	9	Kokoi Baldo	"Love And Devotion"	46.81%	Public's choice
Episodes 27 & 28 (January 31 and February 1, 2015)	Lea Salonga	10	Timmy Pavino	"Hanggang Sa Dulo Ng Walang Hanggan"	unrevealed	Lea's choice
Episodes 27 & 28 (January 31 and February 1, 2015)	Bamboo Mañalac	11	Tanya Diaz	"A Natural Woman"	49.80%	Public's choice
Episodes 27 & 28 (January 31 and February 1, 2015)	apl.de.ap	12	Alisah Bonaobra	"Bituing Walang Ningning"	unrevealed	apl's choice

Non-competition Performances"
Order	Performers	Song
28.1	apl.de.ap, Loonie, Abra, Jessica Reynoso, and Week 1 Winners (Rita Martinez, Nino Alejandro, Leah Patricio, Kai Honasan, Suy Galvez, Jason Fernandez, Monique Lualhati, and Daryl Ong)	"Be" / "Where Is the Love"

=== Week 3 (February 7 & 8) ===
Episode	Coach	Order	Artist	Song	Votes	Result
Episode 29 (February 7, 2015)	apl.de.ap	1	Alisah Bonaobra	"LaserLight"	28.25%	Public's choice (Note: In Team apl, Daryl Ong got 31.16% of the votes, while Alisah Bonaobra got 28.25% of the votes; in Team Sarah, Kokoi Baldo got 41.61% of the votes, while Monique Lualhati got 25.26% of the votes. In Team Lea, Leah Patricio topped the public votes after receiving 40.95%, followed by Timmy Pavino who garnered 24.37%; while in Team Bamboo, Rence Rapanot topped the public votes after receiving 50.78%, followed by Rita Martinez who got 18.10%)
Episode 29 (February 7, 2015)	apl.de.ap	2	Daryl Ong	"Smile"	31.16%	Public's choice
Episode 29 (February 7, 2015)	apl.de.ap	3	Suy	"Bridge over Troubled Water"	unrevealed	Eliminated
Episode 29 (February 7, 2015)	apl.de.ap	4	Mackie Cao	"Maghintay Ka Lamang"	unrevealed	apl's choice
Episode 29 (February 7, 2015)	Sarah Geronimo	5	Kokoi Baldo	"Could You Be Loved"	41.61%	Public's choice
Episode 29 (February 7, 2015)	Sarah Geronimo	6	Jason Fernandez	"Moves like Jagger"	unrevealed	Eliminated
Episode 29 (February 7, 2015)	Sarah Geronimo	7	Jason Dy	"OMG"	unrevealed	Sarah's choice
Episode 29 (February 7, 2015)	Sarah Geronimo	8	Monique Lualhati	"Bang Bang"	25.26%	Public's choice
Episode 30 (February 8, 2015)	Lea Salonga	1	Nino Alejandro	"Livin' on a Prayer"	unrevealed	Lea's choice
Episode 30 (February 8, 2015)	Lea Salonga	2	Timmy Pavino	"My Heart Will Go On"	24.37%	Public's choice
Episode 30 (February 8, 2015)	Lea Salonga	3	Miro Valera	"Kiss from a Rose"	unrevealed	Eliminated
Episode 30 (February 8, 2015)	Lea Salonga	4	Leah Patricio	"Healing"	40.95%	Public's choice
Episode 30 (February 8, 2015)	Bamboo Mañalac	5	Rita Martinez	"Sweet Dreams"	18.10%	Public's choice
Episode 30 (February 8, 2015)	Bamboo Mañalac	6	Tanya Diaz	"Take Me to Church"	unrevealed	Bamboo's choice
Episode 30 (February 8, 2015)	Bamboo Mañalac	7	Kai Honasan	"Jealous"	unrevealed	Eliminated
Episode 30 (February 8, 2015)	Bamboo Mañalac	8	Rence Rapanot	"Para sa Masa"	50.78%	Public's choice

Non-competition Performances
Order	Performers	Song
29.1	Nino Alejandro, Timmy Pavino, Miro Valera, and Rence Rapanot	"Babaero"
29.2	Leah Patricio, Rita Martinez, Tanya Diaz, and Kai Honasan	"Mambobola"
30.1	Anne Curtis, Bamboo Mañalac, and his team (Rita Martinez, Tanya Diaz, Kai Honasan and Rence Rapanot)	"I Love It"/"All Night"

=== Week 4 (February 14 & 15) ===
Episode	Coach	Order	Artist	Song	Votes	Result
Episode 31 (February 14, 2015)	Bamboo Mañalac	1	Rence Rapanot	"Kumusta Na"	44.88%	Public's choice (Note: In Team Bamboo, Rence Rapanot received 44.88% of the public votes; in Team apl, Alisah Bonaobra got 47.22% of votes. In Team Sarah, Jason Dy received 44.67% of the public votes; in Team Lea, Timmy Pavino got 50.08% of votes.)
Episode 31 (February 14, 2015)	Bamboo Mañalac	2	Tanya Diaz	"Because of You"	unrevealed	Eliminated
Episode 31 (February 14, 2015)	Bamboo Mañalac	3	Rita Martinez	"Paglisan"	unrevealed	Bamboo's choice
Episode 31 (February 14, 2015)	apl.de.ap	4	Daryl Ong	"Rolling in the Deep"	unrevealed	apl's choice
Episode 31 (February 14, 2015)	apl.de.ap	5	Mackie Cao	"Sirena"	unrevealed	Eliminated
Episode 31 (February 14, 2015)	apl.de.ap	6	Alisah Bonaobra	"Let It Go"	47.22%	Public's choice
Episode 32 (February 15, 2015)	Sarah Geronimo	1	Kokoi Baldo	"Message in a Bottle"	unrevealed	Eliminated
Episode 32 (February 15, 2015)	Sarah Geronimo	2	Monique Lualhati	"Butterfly"	unrevealed	Sarah's choice
Episode 32 (February 15, 2015)	Sarah Geronimo	3	Jason Dy	"Kahit Kailan"	44.67%	Public's choice
Episode 32 (February 15, 2015)	Lea Salonga	4	Leah Patricio	"Because You Loved Me"	unrevealed	Lea's choice
Episode 32 (February 15, 2015)	Lea Salonga	5	Nino Alejandro	"I Want to Know What Love Is"	unrevealed	Eliminated
Episode 32 (February 15, 2015)	Lea Salonga	6	Timmy Pavino	"Story of My Life"	50.08%	Public's choice

Non-competition Performances
Order	Performers	Song
31.1	Alex Gonzaga, Toni Gonzaga, and Team Sarah and Team Lea (Kokoi Baldo, Monique Lualhati, Jason Dy, Leah Patricio, Nino Alejandro, and Timmy Pavino)	"Love Me Harder" / "Break Free"
32.1	Sarah Geronimo and Teams apl and Bamboo's Top 2 (Rence Rapanot, Rita Martinez, Daryl Ong, and Alisah Bonaobra)	"For Once in My Life"
30.1	Matt Monro, Jr.	"Portrait of My Love"

=== Week 5: Semifinals (February 21 & 22) ===
Coach	Artist	Saturday		Sunday		Summary of Points			Result
Coach	Artist	Order	Solo song	Order	Duet song	Coach's	Public's	Total	Result
Sarah Geronimo	Monique Lualhati	1	"Fighter"	3	"Nothing's Gonna Stop Us Now"	45.00	34.81	39.91	Eliminated
Sarah Geronimo	Jason Dy	2	"Back at One"	3	"Nothing's Gonna Stop Us Now"	55.00	65.19	60.10	Safe
apl.de.ap	Alisah Bonaobra	3	"Lipad ng Pangarap"	1	"One Sweet Day"	55.00	45.13	50.07	Safe
apl.de.ap	Daryl Ong	4	"Take Me Out of the Dark"	1	"One Sweet Day"	45.00	54.87	49.94	Eliminated
Bamboo Mañalac	Rita Martinez	5	"Himala"	2	"Mahirap Magmahal ng Syota ng Iba"	45.00	42.59	43.80	Eliminated
Bamboo Mañalac	Rence Rapanot	6	"Ikaw at Ako"	2	"Mahirap Magmahal ng Syota ng Iba"	55.00	57.41	56.21	Safe
Lea Salonga	Timmy Pavino	7	"Ikaw Lamang"	4	"Locked Out of Heaven"	45.00	54.42	49.71	Eliminated
Lea Salonga	Leah Patricio	8	"Ikaw Lang Ang Mamahalin"	4	"Locked Out of Heaven"	55.00	45.58	50.29	Safe

Non-competition Performances
Order	Performers	Song
33.1	Lyca Gairanod, Darlene Vibares, and Juan Karlos Labajo	"Ayokong Tumanda" / "Taralets"
33.2	Top 8 Artists	"Applause"
34.1	Lea Salonga	"I'd Like to Teach the World to Sing"
34.2	Lea Salonga and Nicole Beverly Chien	"Tomorrow"

=== Week 6: The Final Showdown (February 28 & March 1) ===
As in the previous season, the finale was aired in a two part episode. However, deviating from previous Live shows, the "1 sim equals 1 vote" rule was implemented. There were four sets of performances per artist in the first round. The results of the votes were then revealed on the second episode of the finals, where the final two artists had to perform in a final showdown. After the two top artists were revealed, the scores were reset to zero. The voting lines were then reopened for the final two, wherein the artist with the highest vote totals was the winner of the competition. The finals were held in the Newport Performing Arts Theater, Resorts World Manila, Pasay.

Color key

Artist was proclaimed as the winner
Artist ended as the runner-up
Artist ended as the third placer
Artist ended as the fourth placer
Artist was advanced on the second round

==== First round ====
Coach	Artist	February 28					March 1				Votes	Result
Coach	Artist	Order	Performance with Guest	with	Order	Solo song	Order	Solo Song	Order	Duet with coaches song	Votes	Result
apl.de.ap	Alisah Bonaobra	1	"Ako Ang Nagwagi"	Dulce	2	"Love on Top"	4	"Go the Distance"	3	"Hero"/"You Can Do Anything"	unrevealed	Advanced
Bamboo Mañalac	Rence Rapanot	2	"Karaniwang Tao"	Joey Ayala & Bayang Barrios	3	"Estudyante Blues"	1	"Tayo'y Mga Pinoy"	4	"Hinahanap-Hanap Kita"	18.02%	Fourth place
Lea Salonga	Leah Patricio	3	"Muli"	Jed Madela	4	"Titanium"	2	"Run To You"	1	"If I Were a Boy"/"You Oughta Know"	19.17%	Third place
Sarah Geronimo	Jason Dy	4	"Wrecking Ball"	Charice	1	"With You"	3	"Angels Brought Me Here"	2	"If I Ain't Got You"	unrevealed	Advanced

==== Second round ====
Coach	Artist	Order	Song	Votes	Result
Sarah Geronimo	Jason Dy	1	"Minsan Lang Kitang Iibigin"	52.94%	Winner
apl.de.ap	Alisah Bonaobra	2	"All by Myself"	47.06%	Runner-up

Non-competition Performances
Order	Performers	Song
35.1	apl.de.ap and Lea Salonga	"Feel This Moment"
35.2	Bamboo Mañalac and Sarah Geronimo	"Sing"
35.3	The Voice Coaches and Top 4 Artists	"Feel This Moment"
36.1	Season 2 Top 4 Artists with Season 1 Top 4 Mitoy Yonting, Klarisse de Guzman, Janice Javier, and Myk Perez	"Rather Be" / "Rest of My Life"

== Elimination Chart ==
=== Results summary ===
Color key
Artist's info

- Artist from Team apl
- Artist from Team Lea
- Artist from Team Sarah
- Artist from Team Bamboo

Result details

- Winner
- Runner-up
- Third place
- Fourth Place
- Artist was saved by the public
- Artist was saved by his/her coach
- Artist was saved after receiving the highest accumulated points
- Artist did not perform on that particular week
- Eliminated

Artist	Week 1	Week 2	Week 3	Week 4	Week 5	Week 6	
Artist	Week 1	Week 2	Week 3	Week 4	Week 5	Round 1	Round 2
Jason Dy		Safe	Safe	Safe	Safe	Safe	Winner
Alisah Bonaobra		Safe	Safe	Safe	Safe	Safe	Runner-up
Leah Patricio	Safe		Safe	Safe	Safe	Third Place	Eliminated (Week 6)
Rence Rapanot		Safe	Safe	Safe	Safe	Fourth Place	Eliminated (Week 6)
Monique Lualhati	Safe		Safe	Safe	Eliminated	Eliminated (Week 5)	
Rita Martinez	Safe		Safe	Safe	Eliminated	Eliminated (Week 5)	
Daryl Ong	Safe		Safe	Safe	Eliminated	Eliminated (Week 5)	
Timmy Pavino		Safe	Safe	Safe	Eliminated	Eliminated (Week 5)	
Nino Alejandro	Safe		Safe	Eliminated	Eliminated (Week 4)		
Kokoi Baldo		Safe	Safe	Eliminated	Eliminated (Week 4)		
Mackie Cao		Safe	Safe	Eliminated	Eliminated (Week 4)		
Tanya Diaz		Safe	Safe	Eliminated	Eliminated (Week 4)		
Jason Fernandez	Safe		Eliminated	Eliminated (Week 3)			
Kai Honasan	Safe		Eliminated	Eliminated (Week 3)			
Suy Galvez	Safe		Eliminated	Eliminated (Week 3)			
Miro Valera		Safe	Eliminated	Eliminated (Week 3)			
Casper Blancaflor		Eliminated	Eliminated (Week 2)				
Douglas Dagal		Eliminated	Eliminated (Week 2)				
Arnee Hidalgo		Eliminated	Eliminated (Week 2)				
Bradley Holmes		Eliminated	Eliminated (Week 2)				
Poppert Bernadas	Eliminated	Eliminated (Week 1)					
Karlo Mojica	Eliminated	Eliminated (Week 1)					
Abbey Pineda	Eliminated	Eliminated (Week 1)					
Ferns Tosco	Eliminated	Eliminated (Week 1)					

=== Per Team ===
Artist's info

- Artist from Team apl
- Artist from Team Lea
- Artist from Team Sarah
- Artist from Team Bamboo

Result details

- Winner
- Runner-up
- Third place
- Fourth place
- Artist did not perform on that particular week
- Eliminated

Artist	Week 1	Week 2	Week 3	Week 4	Week 5	Week 6	
Artist	Week 1	Week 2	Week 3	Week 4	Week 5	Round 1	Round 2
Alisah Bonaobra		Coach's Choice	Public's Choice	Public's Choice	Advanced	Advanced	Runner-up
Daryl Ong	Public's Choice		Public's Choice	Coach's Choice	Eliminated		
Mackie Cao		Public's Choice	Coach's Choice	Eliminated			
Suy Galvez	Coach's Choice		Eliminated				
Bradley Holmes		Eliminated					
Ferns Tosco	Eliminated						
Leah Patricio	Public's Choice		Public's Choice	Coach's Choice	Advanced	Third Place	
Timmy Pavino		Coach's Choice	Public's Choice	Public's Choice	Eliminated		
Nino Alejandro	Coach's Choice		Coach's Choice	Eliminated			
Miro Valera		Public's Choice	Eliminated				
Casper Blancaflor		Eliminated					
Abbey Pineda	Eliminated						
Jason Dy		Coach's Choice	Coach's Choice	Public's Choice	Advanced	Advanced	Winner
Monique Lualhati	Public's Choice		Public's Choice	Coach's Choice	Eliminated		
Kokoi Baldo		Public's Choice	Public's Choice	Eliminated			
Jason Fernandez	Coach's Choice		Eliminated				
Douglas Dagal		Eliminated					
Poppert Bernadas	Eliminated						
Rence Rapanot		Coach's Choice	Public's Choice	Public's Choice	Advanced	Fourth Place	
Rita Martinez	Coach's Choice		Public's Choice	Coach's Choice	Eliminated		
Tanya Diaz		Public's Choice	Coach's Choice	Eliminated			
Kai Honasan	Public's Choice		Eliminated				
Arnee Hidalgo		Eliminated					
Karlo Mojica	Eliminated						

== Reception ==
=== Controversies ===
==== Spoiler issue ====
Several users from Facebook and Twitter were blocked by the social management team of the show after several spoilers of The Battles' winners were posted online. This incident made Salonga furious and disappointed.

==== Joniver Robles' departure from the show ====
After the last episode of the Knockouts that aired last January 19, Mañalac announced that Joniver Robles was replaced by Rita Martinez after the former decided to withdraw from the show for personal reasons. However, in a post of Robles via his Facebook account, he stressed that he never knew about his status until he saw the episode. Due to this, lots of speculation arose online regarding Robles' removal from the show. Salonga was asked about the issue but decided to not comment. She further stated that she was not the proper person to be asked since it was not her team that was involved.

=== Television ratings ===
Television ratings for the second season of The Voice of the Philippines on ABS-CBN were gathered from two major sources – AGB Nielsen and Kantar Media. AGB Nielsen's survey ratings were gathered from Mega Manila households, while Kantar Media's survey ratings were gathered from urban and rural households all over the Philippines.

Based from the data gathered by Kantar Media, the second season was the sixth most watched show in February 2015, garnering an average viewership of 24.4%.

Episode		Original airdate	Timeslot (PST)	AGB Nielsen			Kantar Media			Source
Episode		Original airdate	Timeslot (PST)	Rating	Timeslot	Primetime	Rating	Timeslot	Primetime	Source
1	"The Blind auditions premiere"	October 26, 2014	Sunday 8:30 p.m.	22.4%	#2	#2	28.3%	#1	#1	
2	"The Blind auditions – part 2"	November 2, 2014	Sunday 8:30 p.m.	22.5%	#1	#2	27.5%	#1	#1	
3	"The Blind auditions – part 3"	November 8, 2014	Saturday 8:45 p.m.	24.2%	#1	#1	31.9%	#1	#2	
4	"The Blind auditions – part 4"	November 9, 2014	Sunday 8:30 p.m.	23.8%	#1	#1	28.4%	#1	#1	
5	"The Blind auditions – part 5"	November 15, 2014	Saturday 8:45 p.m.	24.0%	#1	#3	30.4%	#1	#2	
6	"The Blind auditions – part 6"	November 16, 2014	Sunday 8:30 p.m.	25.9%	#1	#1	30.0%	#1	#1	
7	"The Blind auditions – part 7"	November 22, 2014	Saturday 8:45 p.m.	25.3%	#1	#2	30.7%	#1	#1	
8	"The Blind auditions – part 8"	November 23, 2014	Sunday 8:30 p.m.	23.6%	#1	#1	30.7%	#1	#1	
9	"The Blind auditions – part 9"	November 29, 2014	Saturday 8:45 p.m.	24.7%	#1	#2	31.0%	#1	#2	
10	"The Blind auditions – part 10"	November 30, 2014	Sunday 8:30 p.m.	23.8%	#2	#2	29.5%	#1	#1	
11	"The Battles premiere"	December 6, 2014	Saturday 8:45 p.m.	22.8%	#2	#4	23.2%	#1	#1	
12	"The Battles – part 2"	December 7, 2014	Sunday 8:30 p.m.	22.4%	#2	#2	22.7%	#1	#1	
13	"The Battles – part 3"	December 13, 2014	Saturday 8:45 p.m.	21.9%	#1	#2	28.8%	#1	#1	
14	"The Battles – part 4"	December 14, 2014	Sunday 8:30 p.m.	23.0%	#2	#2	29.4%	#1	#1	
15	"The Battles – part 5"	December 20, 2014	Saturday 8:45 p.m.	20.4%	#1	#2	25.5%	#1	#2	
16	"The Battles – part 6"	December 21, 2014	Sunday 8:30 p.m.	19.1%	#2	#3	24.1%	#1	#1	
17	"Highlights premiere"	December 27, 2014	Saturday 8:45 p.m.	18.0%	#1	#2	23.1%	#1	#2	
18	"Highlights – part 2"	December 28, 2014	Sunday 8:30 p.m.	15.1%	#2	#5	19.4%	#2	#3	
19	"Highlights – part 3"	January 3, 2015	Saturday 8:45 p.m.	17.2%	#2	#4	19.0%	#1	#4	
20	"Highlights – part 4"	January 4, 2015	Sunday 8:30 p.m.	15.7%	#2	#5	18.6%	#2	#3	
21	"The Knockouts premiere"	January 10, 2015	Saturday 8:45 p.m.	19.6%	#1	#3	25.3%	#1	#1	
22	"The Knockouts – part 2"	January 11, 2015	Sunday 8:30 p.m.	19.7%	#2	#2	23.4%	#2	#2	
23	"The Knockouts – part 3"	January 17, 2015	Saturday 8:45 p.m.	16.9%	#2	#6	20.2%	#1	#3	
24	"The Knockouts – part 4"	January 18, 2015	Sunday 8:30 p.m.	17.0%	#2	#4	17.7%	#2	#4	
25	"The Live shows premiere"	January 24, 2015	Saturday 8:45 p.m.	15.3%	#3	#6	17.9%	#1	#6	
26	"The Live shows – part 2"	January 25, 2015	Sunday 8:30 p.m.	18.0%	#2	#3	22.2%	#2	#3	
27	"The Live shows – part 3"	January 31, 2015	Saturday 8:45 p.m.	15.2%	#2	#6	21.6%	#1	#3	
28	"The Live shows – part 4"	February 1, 2015	Sunday 8:30 p.m.	17.1%	#2	#4	22.4%	#2	#2	
29	"The Live shows – part 5"	February 7, 2015	Saturday 8:45 p.m.	18.4%	#2	#4	23.7%	#2	#2	
30	"The Live shows – part 6"	February 8, 2015	Sunday 8:30 p.m.	17.9%	#2	#3	22.8%	#2	#2	
31	"The Live shows – part 7"	February 14, 2015	Saturday 8:45 p.m.	16.8%	#2	#4	22.7%	#1	#2	
32	"The Live shows – part 8"	February 15, 2015	Sunday 8:30 p.m.	18.9%	#2	#3	22.7%	#2	#3	
33	"Semifinals – part 1"	February 21, 2015	Saturday 8:45 p.m.	17.5%	#2	#4	25.8%	#1	#2	
34	"Semifinals – part 2"	February 22, 2015	Sunday 8:30 p.m.	17.8%	#2	#2	26.3%	#2	#2	
35	"Finals – part 1"	February 28, 2015	Saturday 8:45 p.m.	21.3%	#2	#3	28.0%	#1	#2	
36	"Finals – part 2"	March 1, 2015	Sunday 8:30 p.m.	23.0%	#2	#2	30.8%	#1	#1	
Season average				20.17%	#2	#3	25.16%	#1	#2	
