= Lougee Basabas =

Filipino musician

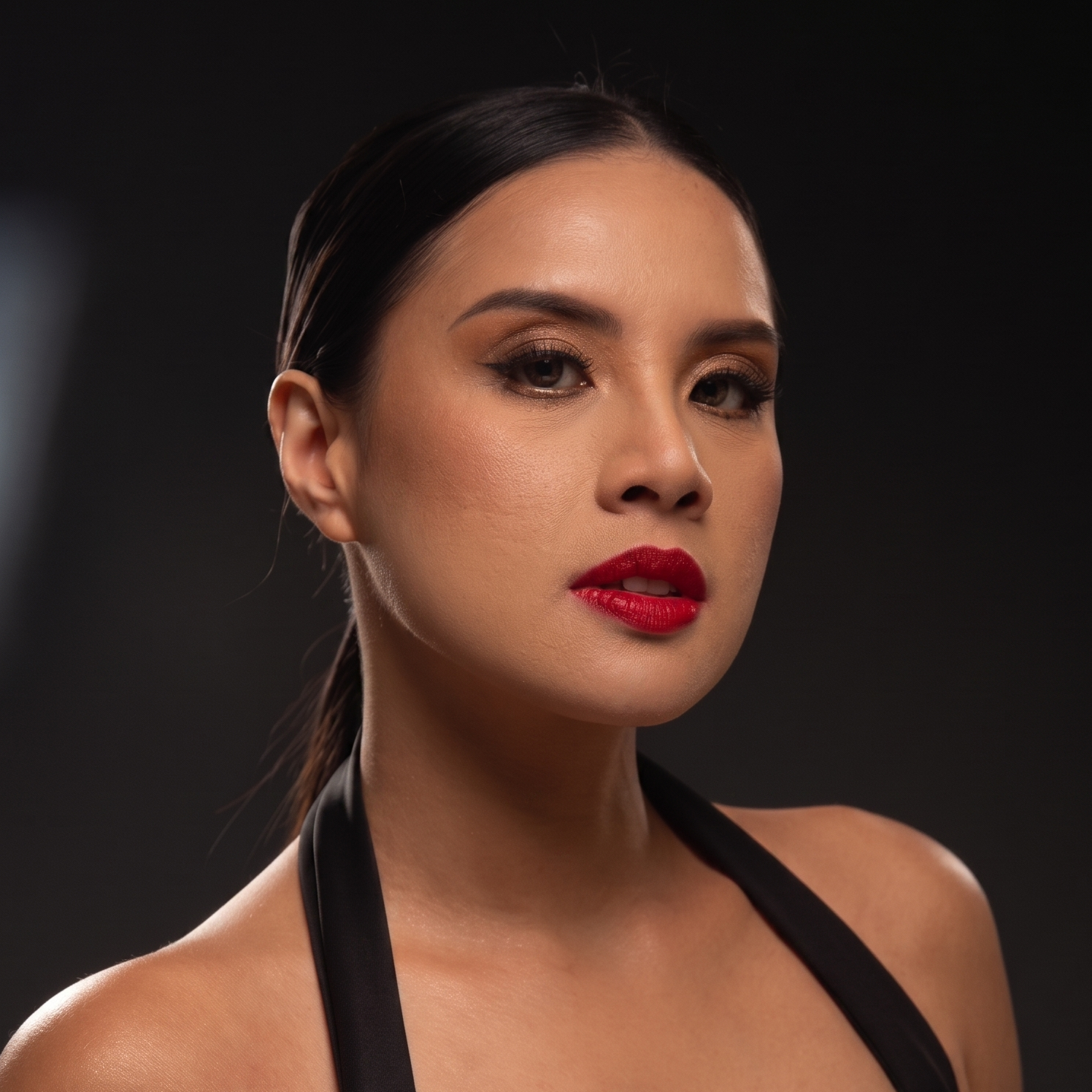

Background information
- Born: Maria Lourdes Grace Valdivia Basabas; October 24, 1984 (age 41); Manila, Philippines
- Genres: Pop rock; alternative; OPM
- Instruments: Guitar; keyboards; bass
- Years active: 1998–present
- Labels: Indie; luKas Music Philippines; Bellhaus Entertainment

Maria Lourdes Grace Valdivia Basabas-Alejandro, better known as Lougee (pronounced "Loo-gee") (born October 24, 1984), is a Filipino singer and songwriter. She is the lead vocalist of the alternative rock band Mojofly and was a host of the popular noontime variety show, Eat Bulaga!.

== Early life ==
Lougee has been appearing in print ads and TV commercials since the age of 14. Before becoming the second generation voice of Mojofly, Lougee was a member of Ryan Cayabyab's pop teen-group, Kaya, which released an album under BMG Records Pilipinas (now Sony-BMG Music Philippines) and one of her ex-groupmates was Pinoy Pop Superstar season 1 contestant Brenan Espartinez. Her first foray in the alternative band scene began when she had her very own indie band named Superlooj (which came from "Super Lougee") formed by Parokya ni Edgar frontman Chito Miranda.

Eventually, she was referred by Mojofly veteran and bassist Ricci Gurango to become the next Mojofly lead vocalist after Kitchie Nadal. She had also been writing songs during her early years; "Tumatakbo", which won Best Animated Video and Favorite Indie Video at the MTV Pilipinas Video Music Awards 2006, along with "Bato" which are some of the songs she wrote at the age of 14. Most of the songwriting was done by her when she assumed the position of lead vocalist for Mojofly.

== Career ==
=== 2003–2007: Mojofly (2nd generation) ===
Lougee redefined the sound of Mojofly with her powerful voice and witty songwriting. In 2002, the singer was already hitting the band circuit with her group Superlooj with members Bon Sundiang (Moonstar88), Kerwin Rossete and Joel Bohol. In the same year, Mojofly bassist Ricci Gurango approached Lougee with an invitation to join Mojofly after their former vocalist, Kitchie Nadal, left the group to pursue her solo career. Upon joining the band, Lougee recorded Mojofly's 1st self-titled EP album in early 2003, which included the band's hit single "Mata". After finalizing the band's roster with Ali Alejandro on drums, Lougee began recording Mojofly's third studio album, Mojofly Now (2005), eventually earning them the MTV Lokal Artist of the Month in March 2005. The album defiantly reflected Lougee's style of songwriting and presence that jolted the band back to the local music scene with a new look and sound. In the same year, Lougee was nominated as Best Female Artist at the NU 107 Rock Awards.

Between 2005 and 2007, Mojofly's presence was very much alive with numerous gigs, endorsements and television appearances. Lougee had also appeared in numerous music videos including "Sinta" by Sugarfree (2003), "I'll Be Yours Forever" by Guji Lorenzana (2006) and "Swimming Beach" by Parokya ni Edgar (2000). Towards the end of the Mojofly's run in 2007, Lougee decided to shift into hosting as part of the Eat Bulaga! family. Her music drive, however, did not halter as she continued with the band Delara under the management of Bellhause Entertainment.

=== 2008–2011: Delara ===
Delara (meaning "of light") was a side project band composed of Lougee, Ali Alejandro (drums), Richard Carandang (bass), Ace Evangelista (guitar) and Marc Crespo (guitar, 2010). After Mojofly departed at the end of 2007, Lougee was determined to start recording again. In mid-2008, Delara came out with their first self-titled album. Of the album's 9 tracks, 8 were written by Lougee. Hosting with Eat Bulaga! streamlined Lougee's intervention into showbiz making her more present to the masses. Musically, Lougee was driven to continue promoting Delara's album.

After leaving Eat Bulaga! in 2010 and their label in 2011, Lougee and the group decided to pursue an indie career as a result of the growing online community in the Philippines. This career move was a huge gamble for Delara's future as the local music scene (during the time) was at an all-time low. This lead eventually to the end of Delara after a 4-year run.

=== 2012–2014: Solo career / The Voice Season 2 ===
At the beginning of 2012, Lougee was determined to continue her path in songwriting. She continued to write and perform around Metro Manila with some minor appearances in television game shows and online shows.

By mid-2013, Lougee was invited to audition for The Voice of the Philippines Season 2 (ABS-CBN). After some months, she was called back to do her blind auditions for the show, evidently picking Bamboo as her coach when both he and coach apl.de.ap turned for her during her song "Strong Enough" by Sheryl Crow. Her journey, however, was cut short as she was eliminated before the live battles portion of the program. Nevertheless, Lougee continued to perform, write and record thereafter with new recognition of her talents because of The Voice. Ultimately, her appearance in the show gave new hope to something that ended a few years before that—the demand the Mojofly's return.

=== 2015: The return to Mojofly ===
After Lougee's appearance on The Voice, fans and patrons of Mojofly began asking if the band would ever reunite. It was apparent that Lougee and her drummer (Ali Alejandro) were still doing shows as "Lougee" as the only 2 remaining members of the former band. Lougee still continued to perform Mojofly songs in her sets as well. In early to mid-2015, the remaining members, with the help of Kiko Montecillo (keys) and Mark Gelbolingo (bass), renamed the band "Lougee" back to Mojofly. In 2015, Mojofly began recording their fourth studio album at Yellow Room Music PH headed by Monty Macalino (vocalist of Mayonnaise (band)).

=== Marriage ===
She eventually married Ali Alejandro in December 2015.

=== Vegetarianism ===
In 2012, she appeared in a list of "sexy vegetarians".

== Television ==
Lougee became a part of the longest-running noontime show in the Philippines, Eat Bulaga!. She started as a featured performer on one of Eat Bulaga!'s segments, "TwinkyOke". Later on, she became one of the hosts which boosted her popularity. She appeared in the TV game show All Star K! twice (2006). She lost to actress Giselle Toengi in the final round during her first appearance, but became the champion in her second appearance months later, beating Stonefree's lead vocalist Miro Valera. She also appeared in Game KNB in 2006 and made her way to the second round (atras-abante round) of the game show. Lougee, and fellow Mojofly member Ali Alejandro co-hosted in the daily morning show Breakfast for one whole week in September 2006. In 2007, she was paired up with figure skater Dikki John Martinez, on the show Stars on Ice on QTV11 along with Bobby Andrews, who was paired to Leslie Pena Ching and Sheree.
