= Kitchie Nadal (album) =

Studio album by Kitchie Nadal
- Released: January 1, 2004; January 26, 2022 (Vinyl Release)
- Recorded: c. 2003 – c. 2004
- Genres: Pop rock; alternative rock; acoustic
- Length: 40:41
- Languages: English; Tagalog
- Labels: Warner; 12Stone
- Producers: Jack Rufo & Kitchie Nadal

Kitchie Nadal chronology
Kitchie Nadal (2004)	Drama Queen TV EP (2007)

Repackaged Edition Slipcase

Singles from Kitchie Nadal
- 1. "Run" Released: October 2003; 2. "Same Ground" Released: January 2004; 3. "Bulong" Released: April 2004; 4. "Huwag Na Huwag Mong Sasabihin" Released: July 2004; 5. "Fire" Released: October 2004

Kitchie Nadal is the self-titled debut studio album by Filipino singer-songwriter Kitchie Nadal, released in the Philippines on January 1, 2004 by Warner Music and 12Stone Records. The album's second single, "Huwag na Huwag Mong Sasabihin", became one of the most-played OPM singles in 2004 and later earned her numerous awards. It was also used as theme song to ABS-CBN's Philippine broadcast of popular Korean TV series Lovers in Paris. The album was peaked at number one in the Philippine Top 10 Albums chart.

== Background and writing ==
After leaving her band MOJOFLY in 2003 after doing two albums with the group, Nadal pursued a solo recording career under Be.Live Artist Management. When asked if she still hangs out with her ex-bandmates—who, according to speculations, were quite disappointed with her abrupt decision—she admitted she still communicates with Ricci Gurango yet not on a regular basis. On the reason why she left Mojofly, she only answered "Mojofly kasi was more of a Ricci band. I only sing songs."

In late 2003, she signed a contract with Warner Music Philippines and became associated with other best-selling talents of the label including Nina, Christian Bautista and Paolo Santos. On writing songs in the album, Nadal admitted on being out-spoken. One best example is the song "Bulong". The album's direction and sound reflects to her spiritual life, saying "Gumagawa ako ng mga songs na parang mga panaginip, parang ini-interpret ko kung paano ako managinip, hindi masyadong malinaw pero, may visual. [I make songs that are like dreams, it's like I interpret what I dream of, it's not that clear but it's visual.] The carrier single, Run, started playing on the radio in mid-2003.

== Reception ==
=== Critical response ===
Paolo Quiazon of Titik Pilipino gave the album three and a half out of five stars, saying "Unless you've been living under a rock, you have probably already heard the (arguably) most overplayed song in the country for the past year: Kitchie Nadal's "Huwag na Huwag Mong Sasabihin." He admits that the song is the catchiest in the album, but it doesn't really tell how the rest of the album sounds. He praised Nadal's songwriting skills, stating "Kitchie Nadal is a deeply personal songwriter, driven by faith and belief – at least on this album. Her reflective wordings play on the foreground of her straightforward musical backdrop. She talks about God, Jesus, salvation, sacrifice and a few other things along the same line. This makes for well thought lyrics, and combined with good music, makes for great songs."

=== Commercial performance ===
The album is considered as one of the best-selling albums in the Philippines, selling over 214,800 units in the country. To date, it has been certified 7× Platinum by the Philippine Association of the Record Industry (PARI).

== Track listing ==
=== Standard edition ===
No.	Title	Author	Length
1.	Breathe	Yvonne Quisumbing	4:01
2.	Same Ground	Anna Katrina Nadal	4:27
3.	Deliverance	Nadal	4:15
4.	Drained	Quisumbing	3:08
5.	Huwag Na Huwag Mong Sasabihin	Nadal	4:10
6.	You're Worthy	Nadal	4:07
7.	Run	Nadal	3:53
8.	Bulong	Nadal • Jeff De Castro • Marco Guzman	3:46
9.	Fire	Nadal	4:24
10.	Same Ground (Piano version)	Nadal	4:30

=== Special limited edition ===
Disc 1 Bonus tracks

No.	Title	Author	Length
1.	Huwag Na Huwag Mong Sasabihin (Acoustic)	Nadal
2.	Pagsubok	John Ong • Naldy Padilla
3.	Pangarap Ko	Nadal

Disc 2 VCD

1. "Run" (music video)
2. "Huwag na Huwag Mong Sasabihin..." (music video)
3. "Bulong!!!" (music video)
4. "Same Ground" (Piano version) (music video)
5. Video clips of gigs (Jam in Japan)

== Personnel ==
- Kitchie Nadal - Vocals
- Aaron Cambronero - Bass
- Jeff De Castro - electric & acoustic guitar
- Marco Guzman - Drums

Additional Musicians:

- Vic Mercado - Drums (Fire)
- Bagets - Drums (Run)
- Rommel de la Cruz - Bass (Deliverance/Run)
- Jack Rufo - Additional Instruments

== Album credits ==
- Executive Producers: Tommy Tanchanco and Roca Cruz
- Album Lay Out & Design: Mon Olega, Roca Cruz & Kitchie Nadal
- Imaging: efish
- Photographer: Iman Mntalvan
- Make Up Artists: Angela Montalvan
- Stylist: Amazing Grace Ministry of Style, Meryl Chavez

== Charts ==
Chart (2004–2005)	Peak position
Philippines Albums Chart	1

== Certifications ==
Country	Provider	Certification	Sales
Philippines	PARI	7× Platinum	214,800
