= Apo View Hotel =

Oldest hotel in Davao City, Philippines

- Interactive map of the Apo View Hotel area

General information
- Status: Completed
- Location: Davao City, Philippines
- Coordinates: 7.06943707490105°N 125.60778383227137°E
- Opening: 1948
- Management: Icon Hotel

Design and construction
- Developer: Pamintuan Development Corp.

Other information
- Number of rooms: 185 (Oct. 2017)

Website
- www.apoview.com

Apo View Hotel is a hotel in Davao City, Philippines. It is the oldest hotel in the city.

== History ==
Apo View Hotel was founded in 1948 shortly after World War II as a 15-room lodging facility. It was a business venture by the Pamintuan family. The hotel had an expansion in 1978 so it can host 100 rooms but experienced a fire in 1988. The hotel was renovated and additional 46 rooms were added.

The former owners of the hotel, Pamintuan Enterprises Inc. became involved in a legal dispute against lender Banco Filipino as well as a leadership crisis which saw Mariano Pamintuan Sr. ousted as chairman of the company by the rest of his family. This issue lasted until the death of the Pamintuan patriarch in the later part of the 1990s.

The Supreme Court gave a favorable ruling to Pamintuan Enterprises on its case with its lender approving its rehabilitation plans for the hotel. This led to the management of Apo View Hotel being transferred to Eurotel Hotel, a subsidiary of Global Comfort Group Corporation (GCGC) in 2014 and later to GCGC affiliate Icon Hotel in 2016.

The Apo View Hotel had a relaunch on October 19, 2017. At the time of its relaunch the hotel had about 185 rooms. Three buildings for residential and commercial use will be built behind the hotel with the construction of the first tower to commence in 2018. By early 2018, it is projected that the hotel will have more than 200 rooms.
