= Stonefree =

Filipino rock band

- Origin: Antipolo, Philippines
- Genres: OPM; pinoy rock; alternative rock; post-grunge
- Instrument: Various
- Years active: 1995–2014
- Labels: 2004–2014 (Warner Music Philippines)
- Members: Miro Valera; Benson Tanoja
- Past members: Relly Mangubat; Regie Mangubat

Stonefree was a Filipino rock band formed in Antipolo, Rizal, Philippines in 1995 that consists of members Regie Mangubat (bass), Relly Mangubat (drums), Benson Tanoja (guitar) and Miro Valera (vocals). They were recently signed under Warner Music Philippines.

== Background ==
Originally named after where Relly and Regie Mangubat lived, near Marikina, as The Marikina Sound Machine, they later changed their name to Stonefree. The band started in 1995 after the Mangubat brothers decided to form a band, adding Valera and Tanoja to the group, all hailing from UP Diliman. Contrary to what most people believe, Stonefree is not named after Jimi Hendrix's song but rather a selection made out of a list of other names. They also stress that the name Stonefree also connotes that rock bands need not the typical "rockstar" attitude to succeed.

During their college heyday in UP, they had regular gigs on local bars performing songs from their influences like Matchbox 20, Jars of Clay and Incubus to name a few. They also performed at events like the San Miguel Oktoberfest, NU Summer Shebang, Pulp Summer Slam, Winston Tour, Rockista, 99.5 RT Ripe Tomatoes, NU Rock Awards, and MTV Music Summit.

They got their break in 2002 after joining Monster Radio RX 93.1's band competition, The RX Band Breakout. Although they did not win, their single "Listen" became a hit and even became Monster Radio RX 93.1 OPM Song of the Year and placed at #3 on 103.5 K-Lite's Yearend Countdown in 2003. The success of "Listen" gave them the start they needed to self-produce a 4-track EP, also entitled Listen, on July 23, 2004. The singles from their EP became hits of their own, "Listen" was a theme on an ABC-5 TV show called Singles. "Kapag Nawala Ka", their second single, gained radio success too. "Baka Naman" and "Listen" were also included in a couple of compilation CDs. This success led them to a record deal under Warner Music Philippines where they released their debut album, Hibiscus (named after the street where their rehearsal studio is at), on August 19 of the same year. The album was produced by Louie Talan and mastered by Imago's Zach Lucero. Rivermaya's Mark Escueta was among their guest performers on the album. The album received success all over the nation as their singles "Ikot" and "Sayang" peaked at various radio countdowns in the Philippines with the latter nominated in the 19th Awit Awards for Best Performance by a New Group. "Langit" was also featured in the Pinoy Big Brother DVD. The album also received many praises, Magic 89.9 gave it a perfect rating, boosting its sales.

Not only were they radio friendly, but they also got featured on several TV shows even before the release of their debut album. Their videos proved to have a lasting mark even on local music stations where they also received success on the MYX Daily Countdown and MTV Diyes. Following their success was the release of their sophomore album, DeLorean on March 17, 2007. "Anghel" was their carrier single and also received success on both radio and local music channels. In mid 2010, the lead drummer and bassist, Relly and Regie, left the band.

The band was then joined by Billy Reyes (Kikomachine) on guitars, Jody Salas (the Brew) on bass, and Nico Pineda (Chubibo) on drums. They recorded a third record, Providence. They were later joined by Shan Regalado (Mayonaise) in drums.

In 2014, Stonefree briefly reunited with the original members, Relly and Regie, for a reunion gig.

Vocalist Miro Valera competed in The Voice of the Philippines (season 2) where in he became a finalist.

== Influences ==
Grunge is what they consider to be their greatest influence. Although traces of other genres (funk, jazz, pop) may be heard on their albums, the band looks up to Radiohead, Red Hot Chili Peppers, Pearl Jam, Goo Goo Dolls, Stone Temple Pilots and Matchbox 20 to name a few, whose songs they usually performed when they were just starting out. Local band Eraserheads is also one of their influences.

== Discography ==
- Listen (2004)
1. "Listen"
2. "Kapag Nawala Ka"
3. "Baka Naman"
- Hibiscus (2005)
1. "Clutch"
2. "Kapag Nawala Ka"
3. "Scar"
4. "Ikot"
5. "Sayang"
6. "The Way She Moves"
7. "Water"
8. "My Star"
9. "Baka Naman"
10. "Listen"
11. "Panahon"
12. "Langit"
13. "Ikaw Pa Rin"
- DeLorean (2007)
1. "Anghel"
2. "LSS"
3. "Tadhana"
4. "Don't Lie To Me"
5. "It's Over"
6. "Nasan Na"
7. "Bend"
8. "Last Days Of May"
9. "Tidal Waves"
10. "Love and Grace"
- Providence (2012)
1. "Camouflage"
2. "Providence"
3. "Teach Me"
4. "Fallin'"
5. "Ecstatic"
6. "Bionic"
7. "A Perfect Place"
8. "Life Designed For You"
9. "Providence (Unplugged)"
10. "A Perfect Place (Piano Version)"
