= Mojofly =

Filipino pop-rock band

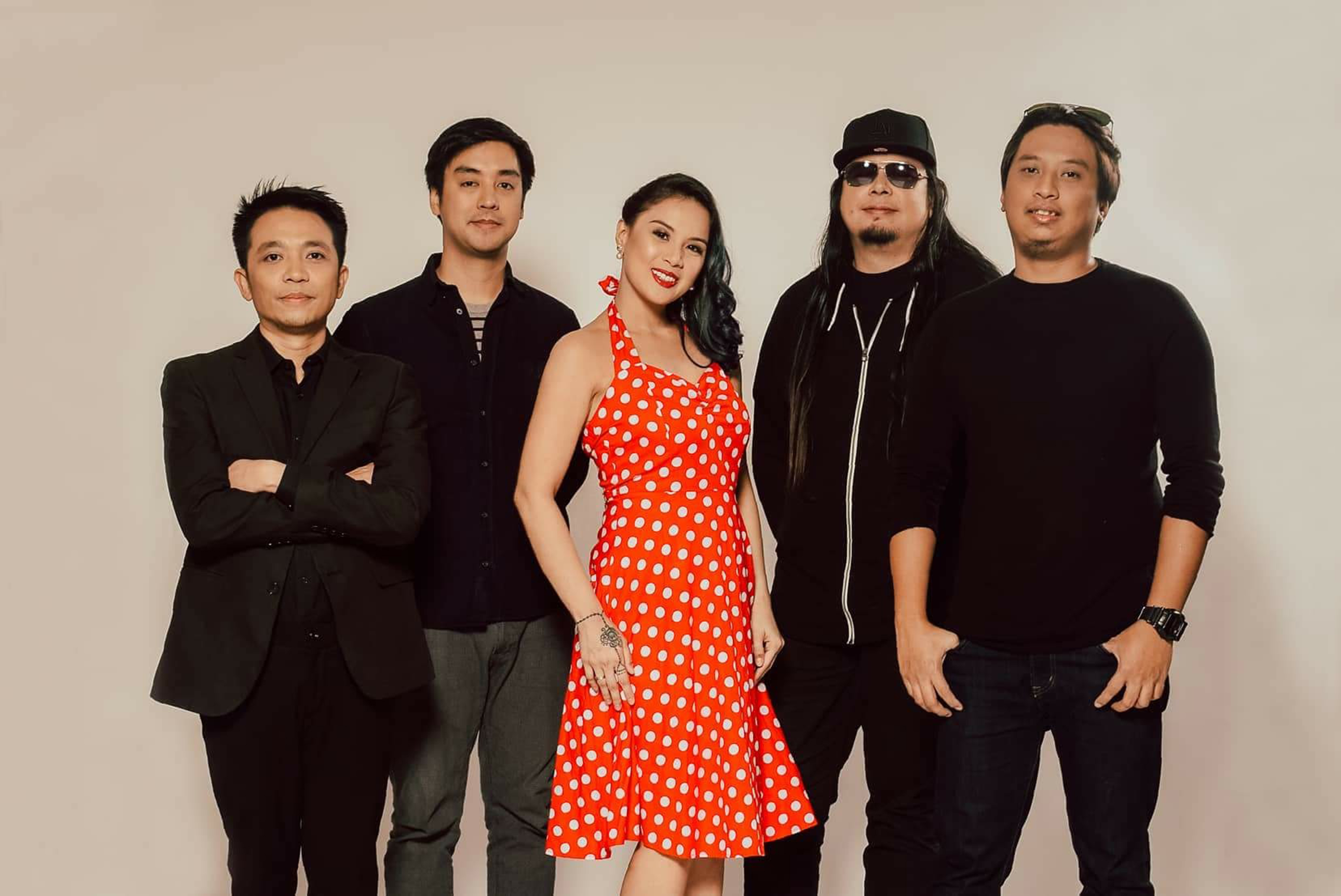
- Mojofly in 2015

Background information
- Origin: Philippines
- Genres: Pop rock; Alternative rock
- Years active: 1999–2008; 2015–present
- Members: Lougee Basabas; Mark Reese Gelbolingo; Ali Alejandro; Kiko Montecillo; Beejay Valera
- Past members: Kitchie Nadal; Ricci Gurango; Rann Golamco; Allan Elgar; Junjun Regalado

Mojofly is a Filipino pop rock band formed in 1999 by former Hungry Young Poets bassist Ricci Gurango. The band's current lineup consists of Lougee Basabas (vocals, guitars), Ali Alejandro (drums), Mark Reese Gelbolingo (bass), Kiko Montecillo (keyboards), and Beejay Valera (guitar).

== History ==
=== 1998-1999: Beginning, the release of Birthday album ===
The band was formed in 1999 by bassist Ricci Gurango after his departure from Hungry Young Poets, he added members including Junjun Regalado on drums, Raymund "Rann" Golamco on guitars and Katrina "Kitchie" Nadal on vocals the band released its first single "Minamalas" written by Ricci Gurango, the single was played on radio stations and become the #2 most requested OPM song on pop station RX 93.1, and charting on other Manila FM stations as well. and their debut album "Birthday" were released in September 1999, the album consists of 14 songs 5 were written in Tagalog, two tracks (Puro Palusot & Half Wishing) were written by Rico Blanco and will be feature on the song "Half Wishing".

=== 2001-2002: A Million Stories ===
In December 2001, Guitarist Raymond Golamco left the band to concentrate on another career. and their follow up album A Million Stories was released in 2002, The album helped propel singles such as Another Day and Scooter Boy to national recognition. In the same year, drummer JunJun Regalado left the band.

=== 2003: Kitchie Nadal's departure ===
In June 2003, Nadal left the group to embark on a solo career. Her last gig with the band took place at June 14 at Robinsons Metro East.

=== 2004-2007: Lougee Basabas Era ===
Mojofly then introduced Lougee Basabas as the band's new frontwoman in only a matter of days. By year's end the group joined the “indie” bandwagon with their self-titled EP (featuring the singles “Turn,” “Mata” and a recycled arrangement of their 1999 single “Minamalas“), sold-out despite being available only in gigs. Because of Mata and the revived, revv-ed up Lougee-version of Minamalas, MOJOFLY (EP) showed the new sound of their group. In January 2005, the band is back to the studio to record their upcoming album to be released in March 2005.

The band went on to release an LP aptly entitled MOJOFLY Now (June 2005), still under independent label luKas Music of artist manager and music publisher Karin Araneta. This time distributed nationwide by EMI Music Philippines, Lougee took over the reins in songwriting and gained MOJOFLY “street cred” through her novel, cutting-edge compositions. Currently promoting MOJOFLY Now Special Edition (August 2006), the 2-disc package marries the original ‘05 full-length and an A-VCD featuring live tracks from their first major concert at the Music Museum (September 2–3, 2005) and the 3D-animated music video of Tumatakbo.

MOJOFLY is the first local artist to venture into full 3D animation in Philippine music video history. The work was previewed at the 19th Singapore International Film Festival (April 2006) and won Best Animated Video and Favorite Indie Video at the MTV Pilipinas Video Music Awards 2006] (August 2006).

MOJOFLY was featured as MTV Lokal Artist-of-the-Month in March 2005 and received several commercial tie-ins, including campaigns for Del Monte Pizza Sauce, Penshoppe, and Cream Silk conditioners. Their song “Choose” was also used in Cream Silk’s “Girl Power, Pink Power” campaign, which helped increase the band’s visibility through multimedia exposure.

=== 2007-2008: Final years ===
On 2008, bassist - Ricci Gurango, departed from the band. The remaining members (Lougee and Ali) took in Richard Carandang and Ace Evangelista to play the bass and lead guitar respectively. With the new members, the band decided to rename their group as DeLara.

=== 2008-2011: DeLara ===
DeLara remained active from 2008 to 2011 and produced two studio albums (self-titled "DeLara", 2008 and "Just Free", 2010). After the separation of the band, Lougee Basabas went on to pursue a solo career performing in local venues and events. Shortly after, she auditioned for "The Voice of the Philippines" season 2 on ABS-CBN in 2014 and became part of Team Bamboo. A year later, Lougee married Ali Alejandro (Mojofly drummer since 2004) and had a baby boy named Leon in 2016.

=== 2015: Return of Mojofly ===
In 2015, Mojofly started to perform in small production events but had not publicly announced their return to the local performing circuit. It was only later in the same year that they started to record their 4th studio album (2nd studio album with the 2nd generation Mojofly members Ali & Lougee) with Yellow Room Music Philippines, headed by Monty Macalino (vocalist of Mayonnaise (band)). The band was able to release 1 single entitled "Rally" in May 2018 for online and streaming platforms invoking that Mojofly is back with members Mark Reese Gelbolingo on Bass, Kiko Montecillo on Keyboards, and Beejay Valera on Lead Guitars.

=== Present status ===
In March 2019, Mojofly released their latest 8-track album entitled Mula Noon.

Their hit song "Tumatakbo" which won Best Animated Video at the MTV Pilipinas Music Awards in 2006 became the theme song of the fantasy-drama series The Lost Recipe, which aired in 2021 on GMA Network.

== Personnel ==
Current members

- Lougee Basabas–Alejandro - vocals, guitars (2004–present)
- Ali Alejandro - drums (2006–2008, 2012–present)
- Mark Reese Gelbolingo - bass guitar (2012-present)
- Kiko Montecillo - keyboards (2012–present)
- Beejay Valera - guitar (2016-present)

Early members

- Kitchie Nadal - vocals, guitars (1999–2003)
- JunJun Regelado - drums (1999–2002)
- Raymond Golamco - guitar (1999–2001)
- Ricci Gurango - bass guitar (1999–2008)
- Allan Elgar - guitar (2004–2007)

== Discography ==
=== Studio albums ===
- Birthday (Sony BMG Music Philippines) (1999)
- A Million Stories (Sony BMG Music Philippines) (2002)
- Now (luKas Music/EMI) (2005)
- Mula Noon (Yellow Room Music PH) (2019)

=== Singles ===
- "Baterya" (Yellow Room Music PH) (2024)
- “Mamahalin Mo Ba Ako” (Yellow Room Music PH) (2023)
- “Sympatiko” with Monty Macalino (Yellow Room Music PH) (2022)
- "Rally" (Yellow Room Music PH) (2018)
- "Kapit-Lapit" (Self-produced) (2020)
- "Pwede Naman" (self-produced) (2020)

=== Compilations ===
- MOJOFLY - EP (luKas Music) (2003)
- Now Special 2-Disc Edition (luKas Music/EMI) (2006)
- 2 in 1 Series: MOJOFLY (Sony BMG Music Philippines) (2006)

=== Compilation appearances ===
- 2006 Songs from Dawson's Creek Volume 2 - "Peak" (Asian Edition) (Sony BMG)

== Awards and nominations ==
Year	Award giving body	Category	Nominated work	Results
1999	"RX 93.1 Year-End Awards for OPM artists"	Best New Artist	—N/a	Won
2002	NU Rock Awards	Drummer of the Year	(for Junjun Regalado)	Nominated
2003	16th Awit Awards	Best Album Package	"A Million Stories"	Nominated
2005	NU Rock Awards	Best Female Award	(for Lougee Basabas)	Nominated
2006	MTV Pilipinas Video Music Awards	Best Animated Video	"Tumatakbo"	Won
2006	MTV Pilipinas Video Music Awards	Favorite Indie Video	"Tumatakbo"	Won
2006	NU Rock Awards	Best Female Award	(for Lougee Basabas)	Nominated
