= Kitchie Nadal =

Filipina singer (born 1980)

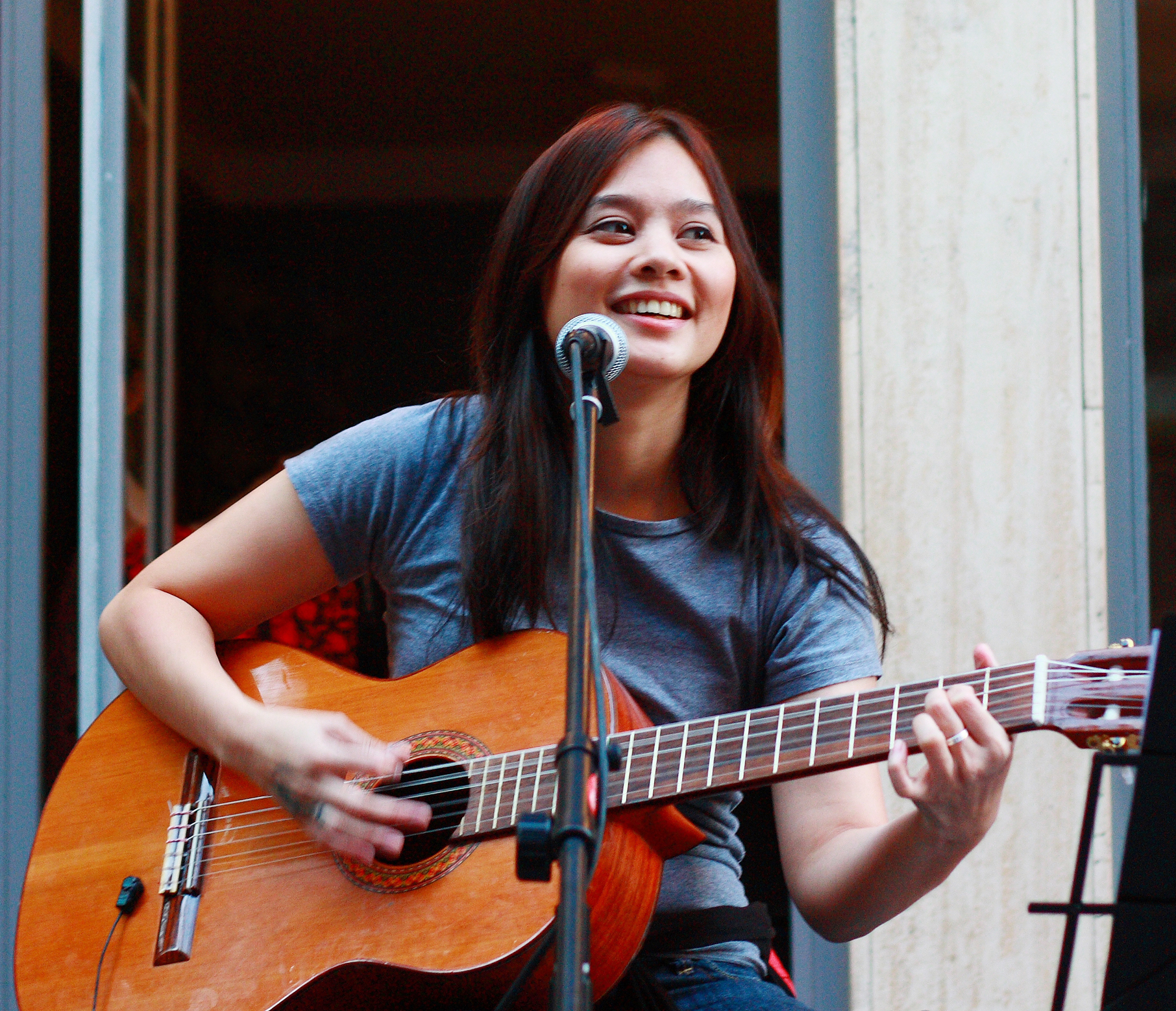
- Nadal in 2009
- Born: Anna Katrina Dumilon Nadal; September 16, 1980 (age 46); Manila, Philippines
- Spouse: Carlos López (m. 2015)
- Children: 2
- Relatives: Rico Blanco (cousin)
- Musical career
- Genres: Pop rock; alternative rock; OPM
- Occupations: Singer; songwriter; guitarist
- Instruments: Guitar; vocals
- Years active: 1998–present
- Labels: Warner; GMA; Be.Live; 12 Stone/Universal
- Formerly of: Mojofly
- Website: http://www.kitchienadal.com

Anna Katrina "Kitchie" Dumilon Nadal-López (born September 16, 1980) is a Filipina singer-songwriter who was formerly the lead vocalist for the alternative rock band, Mojofly. Her popularity in the female OPM niche grew after she released a self-titled solo album featuring her chart-topping single, "Huwag na Huwag Mong Sasabihin". Her debut self-titled album Kitchie Nadal debuted at number 4 on the Philippine Albums Chart, and after a year end the album climbed up at number 1 with growing sales the album was certified 7×Platinum by PARI with sales of 214,800 physical CD album copies in the Philippines.

== Career ==
In 2004, Nadal revived a Carpenters song, "Merry Christmas Darling" from the Warner Philippines Christmas album, The Warner Music Philippines All-Stars Christmas Collection.

In 2005, to support the United Nations Millennium Campaign, Nadal and 26 other Filipino artists contributed to the album entitled Tayo Tayo Rin Sa 2015 - Sing the Songs. Find your Voice. Change the World. It's your Choice, released by the United Nations (in the Philippines). March 2008 saw Nadal releasing her second album Love Letter with 17 all original tracks. Her latest single Highway, which was used for Caltex, had extensive radio airplay.

Nadal's interpretation of Iniibig Kita has been included in ABS-CBN's first tele-epiko Rounin. In 2008, ABS-CBN picked her again to revive Himala (a Rivermaya original), as the supposed theme song for the soap Humingi Ako Sa Langit (retitled as Habang May Buhay).

She formerly endorsed multinational gas company Caltex. Nadal appeared in a Caltex commercial along with other international musicians.

In 2025, Nadal returned to the Philippines to hold her first solo concert, titled "New Ground", which was held at the Araneta Coliseum on June 21.

== Personal life ==
Nadal's roots originate from Dagami, Leyte which is her family's hometown. She is an alumna of St. Scholastica's College, Manila. She has also completed a double degree major in education and psychology at De La Salle University-Manila.

She married Spanish journalist Carlos López on February 26, 2015 in Tagaytay. They have two children. In 2017, she and her family moved to Spain, and have since resided in Madrid.

== Discography ==
- 2004 - Kitchie Nadal (Warner Music Group)
- 2007 - Drama Queen TV EP (GMA Music)
- 2008 - Love Letter (Be.Live Artists)
- 2013 - Malaya (12 Stone/Universal Records)
- 2025 - New Ground EP

== Collaboration albums that include Kitchie Nadal ==
- Tunog Acoustic 1 to 4 (Warner Music Philippines, 2003–2006)
- Acoustic Night Live 2 (Viva Records, 2004)
- Perfectly Acoustic 2 (Octoarts Music Philippines, 2004)
- All-Star Christmas Collection (Warner Music Philippines, 2004)
- The MDG Album: Tayo Tayo Rin Sa 2015 (UN Philippines, 2005)
- Supersize Rock (Warner Music Philippines, 2005)
- Ultraelectromagneticjam!: The Music Of The Eraserheads (Sony BMG Music Philippines, 2005)
- Kami nAPO muna: A Tribute to APO (Universal Records, 2006)
- The Best Of Manila Sound: Hopia Mani Popcorn (Viva Records, 2006)
- Mga Awit ng Puso: The Best of GMA Themes Vol. 2 (GMA Music, 2006)
- I-Star 15: The Best of Alternative & Rock (Star Music, 2010)

== Singles ==
Original songs:

- "Bulong!!!" (later covered by Jikamarie)
- "Fire"
- "Huwag Na Huwag Mong Sasabihin" (later covered by Michael V. (as a parody song), SUD and Lola Amour)
- "Majika" (original soundtrack for the GMA 7 TV series Majika)
- "Malaya"
- "Run"
- "Same Ground" (also covered by Rangel)
- "Simula Ngayon"
- "Wandering Stars"
- "Soundtrip"

Cover versions:

- "Ligaya" (originally by Eraserheads, later also covered by Mayonnaise)
- "Merry Christmas Darling" (originally by The Carpenters)
- "Pag-Ibig" (originally by APO Hiking Society, also covered by Regine Velasquez-Alcasid for a Nestlé ad)
- "Pers-Labs" (originally by Cinderella, later covered by Charlie Green)

== Soundtracks ==
- Rounin TV Soundtrack (Star Music, 2007)

== Collaborations ==
- Additional vocals for Ilog for Rivermaya's album Isang Ugat, Isang Dugo, 2006
- Greatest Day - duet with an old version by Charlene Deslate and Harlene Delgado and a new version by Anja Aguilar and Marika Sasaki, a single written for Sunsilk (Unilever Philippines), 2007
- Makulay Na Buhay - Kitchie wrote the theme song for the GMA TV show I Luv NY, sung by Jolina Magdangal.
- In A Big Way - a duet with European pop/rock band INSIGHT. There are two versions of this song in the album LOVE LETTER, the Kitchie Nadal version and the Insight version.
- Walk On Water - Akshai Sarin is a co-writer and producer
- Tadhana - Kitchie shares writing credits with Jack Rufo
- Idoy, Uday - Kitchie and Bullet Dumas perform Dumas' arrangement of the traditional Waray song.

== Awards and nominations ==
Year	Award giving body	Category	Nominated work	Results
2005	Aliw Awards	Most Promising Entertainer of the Year (Female)	—N/a	Won
2005	Aliw Awards	Best Performance in a Concert (Female)	—N/a	Won
2005	Awit Awards	Best Performance by a Female Recording Artist	"Huwag Na Huwag Mong Sasabihin"	Won
2005	Awit Awards	Best Ballad	"Huwag Na Huwag Mong Sasabihin"	Won
2005	MTV Pilipinas Music Awards	MTV Ayos! Award for Chart Attack Song of the Year	"Huwag Na Huwag Mong Sasabihin"	Won
2005	Nickelodeon Kids' Choice Award	Pinoy Wannabe	—N/a	Won
2005	NU Rock Awards	Best Female Award	—N/a	Nominated
2005	NU Rock Awards	Artist of the Year	—N/a	Nominated
2005	NU Rock Awards	Music Video of the Year	"Same Ground"	Nominated
2006	MTV Asia Awards	Favorite Artist (Philippines)	—N/a	Nominated
2006	MTV Pilipinas Music Awards	Favorite Female Artist in a Video	"Fire"	Won
2006	MYX Music Awards	Favorite Female Artist	—N/a	Nominated
2007	20th Awit Awards	Best Song Written for Movie/TV/Stage Play	"Majika"	Won
2008	Awit Awards	Best World/Alternative/Bossa Music Recording	"Buwan"	Nominated
2009	Philippine Radio Music Awards	Best Independent Artist	—N/a	Won
