= Eraserheads discography =

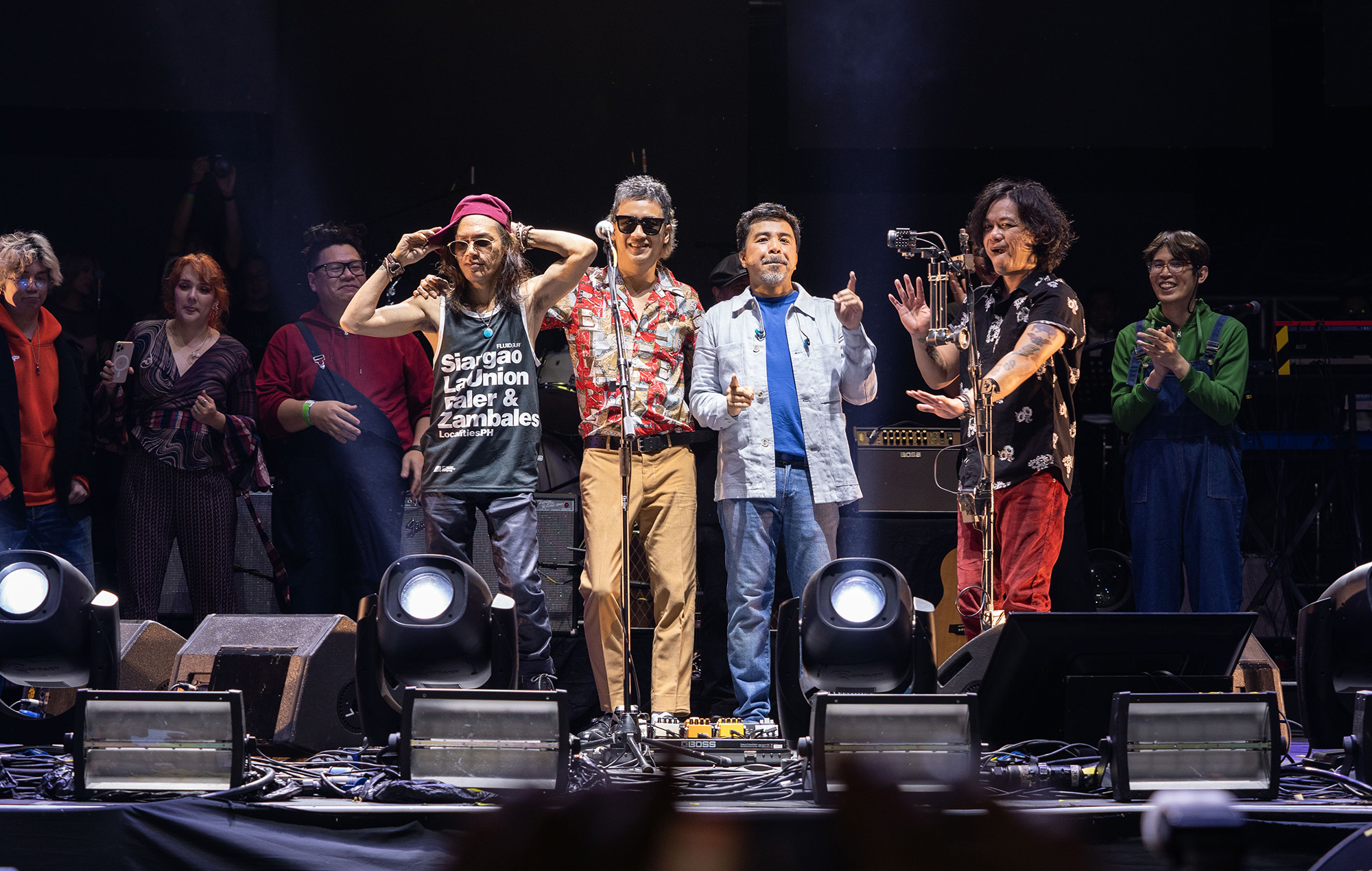
- Eraserheads during the Huling El Bimbo reunion concert in 2022
- Studio albums: 7
- Extended plays: 3
- Live albums: 2
- Compilation albums: 5
- Singles: 21
- Music videos: 13

Eraserheads are a Philippine alternative rock band. Formed in Quezon City in 1989, the group consists of singer Ely Buendia, bassist Buddy Zabala, guitarist Marcus Adoro, and drummer Raimund Marasigan. The Eraserheads discography consists of seven studio albums, two live albums, five compilation albums, three extended plays (EP), 21 singles, two video albums and 13 music videos.

With their debut album Ultraelectromagneticpop! (1993) and the following albums Circus (1994) and Cutterpillow (1995), Eraserheads ushered in a second wave of Filipino rock bands in the 1990s. Their first three albums also achieved commercial success, with Cutterpillow becoming the third biggest-selling album in OPM history and the biggest for any Filipino band or group.

After releasing the Christmas-themed concept album Fruitcake (1996), Eraserheads experimented with electronic and art rock styles for their next albums Sticker Happy (1997), Natin99 (1999), and Carbon Stereoxide (2001). The band broke up in 2002, and all principal former members have enjoyed success as solo artists. They later reunited in 2008 for a series of reunion concerts in the Philippines and have since made sporadic touring and promotional appearances in the country and overseas.

== Albums ==
=== Studio albums ===
List of albums, with sales and certifications
Title	Album details	Sales	Certifications
Ultraelectromagneticpop!	Released: July 1, 1993; Label: BMG, Musiko; Format: CD, cassette, LP	PHI: 200,000+	PARI: 8× Platinum
Circus	Released: November 4, 1994; Label: BMG, Musiko; Format: CD, cassette, LP	PHI: 214,000+	PARI: 7× Platinum
Cutterpillow	Released: December 8, 1995; Label: BMG, Musiko; Format: CD, cassette, LP	PHI: 400,000+	PARI: 14× Platinum (Diamond)
Fruitcake	Released: December 6, 1996; Label: BMG, Greater East Asia; Format: CD, cassette	PHI: 122,000+	PARI: 3× Platinum
Sticker Happy	Released: September 11, 1997; Label: BMG, Greater East Asia; Format: CD, cassette	PHI: 120,000+	PARI: 3× Platinum
Natin99	Released: May 19, 1999; Label: BMG, Greater East Asia; Format: CD, cassette	PHI: 20,000+	PARI: Gold
Carbon Stereoxide	Released: March 10, 2001; Label: BMG, Musiko; Format: CD, cassette	PHI: 12,000+	

=== Live albums ===
Title	Album details
The Reunion Concert 08.30.08	Released: November 3, 2008; Labels: BMG; Formats: CD, digital download
Huling El Bimbo (Live at 2022 The Eraserheads Reunion Concert)	Released: March 15, 2024; Labels: WEU Event Management Services; Formats: Digital download

=== Compilation albums ===
Title	Album details	Sales and Certifications
Aloha Milkyway	Released: August 12, 1998; Label: BMG; Formats: CD, cassette	
Eraserheads: The Singles	Released: 2001; Label: BMG; Formats: CD, cassette	
Eraserheads Anthology	Released: January 23, 2004; Label: BMG; Formats: CD	PHI: 209,000+; 6× Platinum
Eraserheads Anthology Two	Released: August 16, 2006; Label: BMG; Formats: CD	
The Heads Set	Released: September 7, 2010; Label: Sony Music Entertainment; Formats: 10×CD, DVD box set	

== Extended plays ==
Title	Album details
Fruitcake EP	Released: November 1996; Formats: CD, cassette; Label: BMG
Bananatype	Released: June 1997; Formats: CD, cassette; Label: BMG
Please Transpose	Released: August 2002; Formats: CDr; Label: Self-released

== Singles ==
List of singles, showing year released and album name
Title	Year	Album	Notes
"Ligaya"	1993	Ultraelectromagneticpop!	
"Pare Ko"	1993	Ultraelectromagneticpop!	
"Toyang"	1993	Ultraelectromagneticpop!	
"Shirley"	1994	Ultraelectromagneticpop!	
"Kailan"	1994	Circus	
"Overdrive"	1996	Cutterpillow	
"Fruitcake"	1996	Fruitcake	
"Harana"	1997	Bananatype	
"Milk and Money"	1997	The New York Mixes	Promotional CD single
"Hard to Believe"	1997	The New York Mixes	Promotional CD single
"Andalusian Dog"	1997	The New York Mixes	Promotional CD single
"Kaliwete"	1997	Sticker Happy	Promotional CD single
"Hard to Believe"	1998	Sticker Happy	Promotional CD single
"Para sa Masa"	1998	Sticker Happy	Promotional CD single
"Julie Tearjerky"	1998	Aloha Milkyway	Promotional CD single
"Tamagotchi Baby"	1999	Aloha Milkyway	Promotional CD single
"With a Smile"	1999	Aloha Milkyway	Promotional CD single
"Maselang Bahaghari"	1999	Natin99	Promotional CD single
"Huwag Kang Matakot"	1999	Natin99	Promotional CD single
"Maskara"	2001	Carbon Stereoxide	Promotional CD single
"Hula"	2001	Carbon Stereoxide	
"How Far Will U Go"	2001	Carbon Stereoxide	
"U Make Me"	2002	Please Transpose	
"Sabado"	2014	Sabado/1995	Released as part of the September 2014 issue of the Philippine edition of Esquire
"1995"	2014	Sabado/1995	Released as part of the September 2014 issue of the Philippine edition of Esquire

== Other appearances ==
List of non-single appearances, showing year released and album name
Title	Year	Album
"Run Barbi Run"	1995	Best OPM Collection Volume 4
"Casa Fantastica"	1996	1896: Ang Pagsilang
"Tuwing Umuulan at Kapiling Ka"	1996	The Silver Album
"Pumapatak Ang Ulan"	2000	Nescafé Open Up Party
"Blue Jeans"	2000	Nescafé Open Up Party
"Manila"	2001	Bandang Pinoy Lasang Hotdog: The Hotdog Tribute Album

== Videography ==
=== Video albums ===
Title	Album details
Eraserheads: The Reunion Concert	Released: January 31, 2009; Label: BMG; Format: DVD
Pop-U-Mentary!	Released: September 7, 2010; Label: Sony Music Entertainment; Format: DVD

=== Music videos ===
List of music videos, showing year released and directors
Title	Year	Director	Notes
"With a Smile" (version 1)	1994	Art Borromeo and Linette Buenaseda	
"Ang Huling El Bimbo"	1995	Auraeus Solito	
"Fruitcake"	1997	Mark Gary	
"Trip to Jerusalem"	1997	Mark Gary	
"Kaliwete"	1997	Matthew Rosen	
"Julie Tearjerky"	1998	Matthew Rosen	
"Spoliarium"	1998	Matthew Rosen	
"Para sa Masa"	1998	Rico Gutierrez	Made for the GMA TV special "Sigla ng Siglo" to commemorate the Philippine Centennial.
"With a Smile" (version 2)	1998	Ely Buendia and Mark Villena	Made to promote the song's rerelease as part of the compilation album Aloha Milkyway for Southeast Asian markets.
"Maskara"	2001	Ely Buendia and Marie Jamora	Released as a bonus VCD for the album Carbon Stereoxide.
"U Make Me"	2002	Marie Jamora	
"Sabado"	2014	Erik Matti	
"1995"	2014	Erik Matti	

== Tribute albums ==
Title	Album details
Ultraelectromagneticjam!: The Music of the Eraserheads	Released: November 29, 2005; Labels: BMG, Musiko
The Reunion: An Eraserheads Tribute Album	Released: May 9, 2012; Labels: Star Music, Star Cinema
Pop Machine the Album: A Collective of Artists Turning Heads This 2020	Released: June 12, 2020; Label: Noisemakers
Cutterpillow: Tribute Album	Released: May 30, 2025; Label: Offshore Music
