= List of songs recorded by Eraserheads =

Songs recorded by Eraserheads

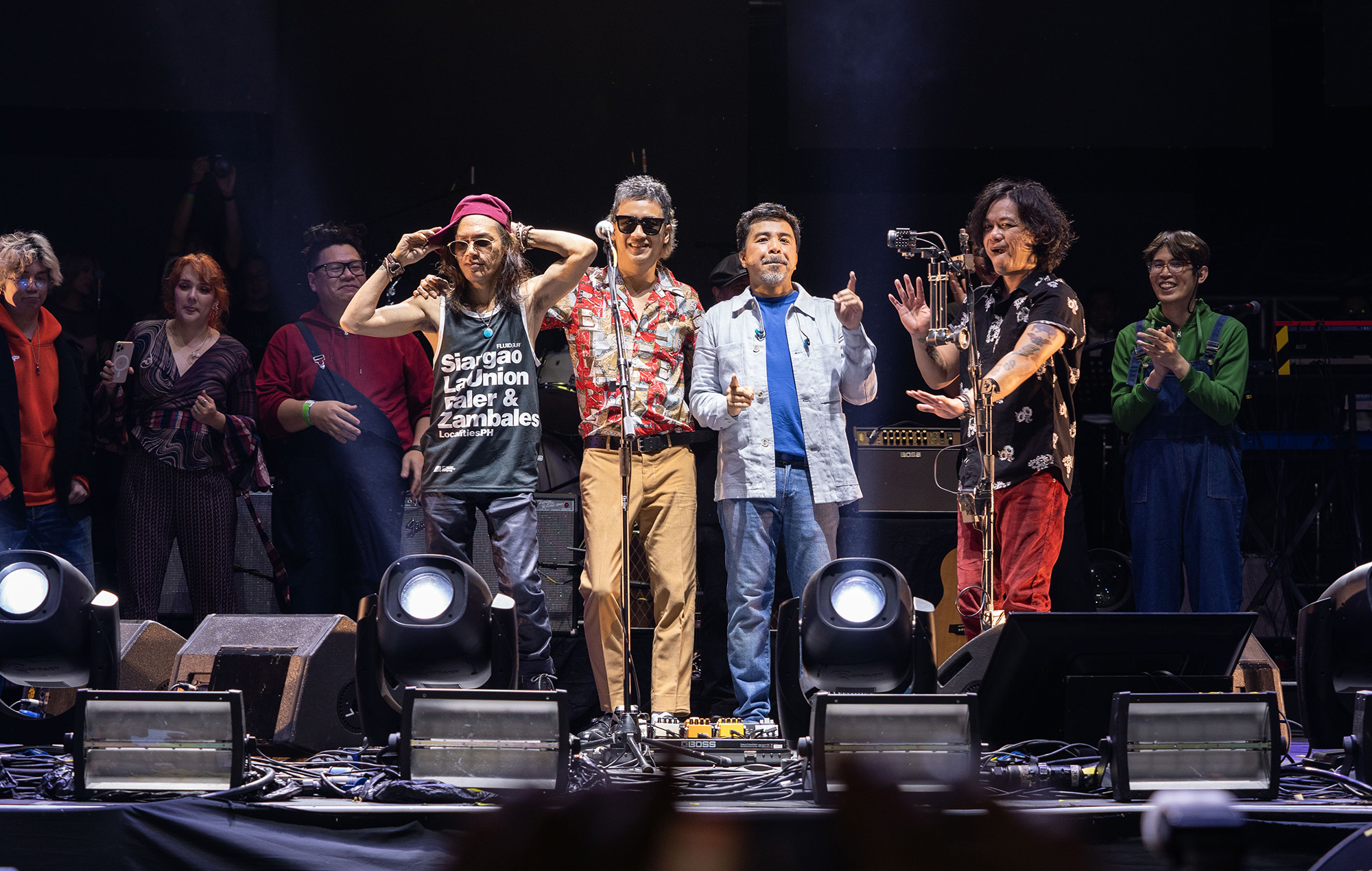
Eraserheads during the Huling El Bimbo reunion concert in 2022.

This is a list of every song ever released by Philippine alternative rock band Eraserheads. It gives information about songwriter(s), length, original release, and year of release. It contains all the songs of the previously released albums, singles and EPs, and all B-sides.

== Songs ==
Key
‡	Indicates cover version
†	Indicates song released as a single or promotional single

Name of song, writer(s), original release, length of song, and year of release
Title	Writer(s)	Original release	Length	Year	Ref.
"68 Dr. Sixto Antonio Avenue"	Ely Buendia	Natin99	5:34	1999	
"1995" †	Ely Buendia; Erwin Romulo	Sabado/1995	3:53	2014	
"Acid Eyes"	Raimund Marasigan	Carbon Stereoxide	0:19	2001	
"Alapaap"	Ely Buendia	Circus	4:23	1994	
"Alkohol"	Raimund Marasigan	Circus	2:53	1994	
"Ambi Dextrose"	Ely Buendia	Sticker Happy	4:56	1997	
"Amen"	Ely Buendia	Pop-U! (unreleased demo)	4:09	1991	
"Andalusian Dog"	Ely Buendia	Sticker Happy	5:01	1997	
"Ang Huling El Bimbo"	Ely Buendia	Cutterpillow	7:29	1995	
"Back2Me"	Ely Buendia; Marcus Adoro; Raimund Marasigan	Cutterpillow	2:14	1995	
"Balikbayan Box"	Ely Buendia	Sticker Happy	5:13	1997	
"Bananatype"	Ely Buendia; Romel Sanchez	Bananatype	3:30	1997	
"Bato"	Marcus Adoro	Circus	4:04	1994	
"Bloodtest"	Raimund Marasigan	Carbon Stereoxide	0:43	2001	
"Blue Jeans" (APO Hiking Society cover)	Danny Javier ‡	Nescafé Open Up Party Live	3:25	2000	
"Bogchi Hokbu"	Ely Buendia	Sticker Happy	4:18	1997	
"Butterscotch"	Ely Buendia	Circus	4:36	1994	
"Casa Fantastica"	Ely Buendia; Buddy Zabala; Marcus Adoro; Raimund Marasigan	1896: Ang Pagsilang	4:36	1996	
"Christmas Alphabet"	Buddy Kaye; Jules Loman; Eraserheads ‡	Fruitcake EP	2:38	1996	
"Christmas Ball"	Raimund Marasigan; Jeng Tan	Fruitcake	3:19	1996	
"Christmas Party"	Ely Buendia	Fruitcake	4:04	1996	
"Combo on the Run"	Ely Buendia; Raimund Marasigan	Ultraelectromagneticpop!	4:02	1993	
"Cutterpillow"	Ely Buendia	Cutterpillow	2:31	1995	
"Dahan Dahan"	Raimund Marasigan	Natin99	2:38	1999	
"Downtown"	Raimund Marasigan	Sticker Happy	4:31	1997	
"Dying Slow"	Raimund Marasigan	Pop-U! (unreleased demo)	4:18	1991	
"Easy Ka Lang"	Ely Buendia	Ultraelectromagneticpop!	4:27	1993	
"Escalator Alligator"	Marcus Adoro	Carbon Stereoxide	1:14	1991	
"Everything Is"	-	Please Transpose	4:24	2002	
"Everything They Say"	Raimund Marasigan	Sticker Happy	3:54	1997	
"The Fabulous Baker Boy"	Buddy Zabala	Fruitcake	5:00	1996	
"Fading River"	Raimund Marasigan	Pop-U! (unreleased demo)	2:51	1991	
"Fill Her"	Ely Buendia; Raimund Marasigan	Cutterpillow	1:47	1995	
"Fine Time"	Raimund Marasigan	Cutterpillow	3:01	1995	
"Flat Tire"	Raimund Marasigan; Jeng Tan	Fruitcake	4:09	1996	
"Fruit Fairy"	Earnest Mangulabnan; Raimund Marasigan; Buddy Zabala	Fruitcake	2:49	1996	
"Fruitcake" †	Ely Buendia	Fruitcake	4:59	1996	
"Futuristic"	Ely Buendia	Sticker Happy	2:51	1997	
"Game, Tama Na!"	Ely Buendia	Natin99	9:20	1999	
"Ganjazz"	Marcus Adoro	Ultraelectromagneticpop!	0:41	1993	
"Gatekeeper"	Raimund Marasigan	Fruitcake	2:43	1996	
"Ha Ha Ha"	Ely Buendia	Sticker Happy	4:42	1997	
"Harana" †	Ely Buendia	Bananatype	6:05	1997	
"Hard to Believe" †	Ely Buendia	Sticker Happy	3:31	1997	
"Hey Jay"	Ely Buendia	Circus	4:39	1994	
"How Far Will U Go" †	Buddy Zabala; Raimund Marasigan	Carbon Stereoxide	3:05	2001	
"Honky-Toinks Granny"	Marcus Adoro	Ultraelectromagneticpop!	1:11	1993	
"Hula" †	Ely Buendia	Carbon Stereoxide	3:06	2001	
"Huwag Kang Matakot" †	Ely Buendia	Natin99	3:10	1999	
"Huwag Mo Nang Itanong"	Ely Buendia	Cutterpillow	4:11	1995	
"I Can't Remember You"	Ely Buendia	Bananatype	3:04	1997	
"I Centric"	Raimund Marasigan	Please Transpose	3:03	2002	
"Insomya"	Marcus Adoro; Raimund Marasigan	Circus	2:03	1994	
"It's Not"	-	Please Transpose	4:47	2002	
"Julie Tearjerky" †	Ely Buendia	Aloha Milkyway	3:37	1998	
"Kahit Ano"	Buddy Zabala	Natin99	3:06	1999	
"Kailan" †	Ely Buendia; Marcus Adoro; Buddy Zabala; Raimund Marasigan; Annie Angala; Karing Evangelista; Auraeus Solito	Circus	3:14	1994	
"Kaliwete" †	Ely Buendia	Sticker Happy	3:07	1997	
"Kamasupra"	Ely Buendia	Cutterpillow	4:36	1995	
"Kananete"	Ely Buendia	Sticker Happy	3:17	1997	
"Kilala"	Raimund Marasigan	Natin99	4:02	1999	
"Lahat"	-	Please Transpose	3:27	2002	
"Ligaya" †	Ely Buendia	Ultraelectromagneticpop!	4:30	1993	
"Lightyears"	Ely Buendia	Fruitcake	4:18	1996	
"Lord of the Rhum"	Marcus Adoro	Fruitcake	4:02	1996	
"Maaalahanin"	Raimund Marasigan	Sticker Happy	3:13	1997	
"Magasin"	Ely Buendia	Circus	4:10	1994	
"Maling Akala"	Ely Buendia; Raimund Marasigan	Ultraelectromagneticpop!	4:16	1993	
"Manila" (Hotdog cover)	Dennis Garcia ‡	Bandang Pinoy Lasang Hotdog: The Hotdog Tribute Album	3:45	2001	
"Maselang Bahaghari" †	Ely Buendia	Natin99	3:28	1999	
"Maskara" †	Ely Buendia	Carbon Stereoxide	4:11	2001	
"May Sumasayaw"	Raimund Marasigan	Natin99	3:27	1999	
"Merry Christmas Everybody Happy New Year Too"	Ely Buendia	Fruitcake	0:57	1996	
"Milk and Money"	Ely Buendia	Sticker Happy	4:41	1997	
"Minsan"	Ely Buendia	Circus	4:15	1994	
"Monovirus"	Raimund Marasigan	Fruitcake	4:28	1996	
"No Royalty Album Filler No. 9"	Marcus Adoro	Circus	1:02	1994	
"OK Comprende"	Raimund Marasigan	Carbon Stereoxide	0:27	2001	
"Old Fashioned Christmas Carol"	Ely Buendia	Fruitcake	4:39	1996	
"Omnesia"	Ely Buendia	Carbon Stereoxide	4:14	2001	
"One Last Angry Look"	Ely Buendia	Pop-U! (unreleased demo)	4:37	1991	
"Out of Sight"	Buddy Zabala; Raimund Marasigan	Carbon Stereoxide	3:09	2001	
"Outside"	Ely Buendia; Buddy Zabala; Earnest Mangulabnan	Carbon Stereoxide	5:32	2001	
"Overdrive" †	Ely Buendia; Raimund Marasigan	Cutterpillow	5:05	1995	
"Overdrive (Reprise)"	Ely Buendia; Raimund Marasigan	Cutterpillow	3:02	1995	
"Paint Stripper"	Raimund Marasigan	Carbon Stereoxide	3:28	2001	
"Palamig"	Ely Buendia	Carbon Stereoxide	4:22	2001	
"Para sa Masa" †	Ely Buendia	Sticker Happy	4:57	1997	
"Pare Ko" †	Ely Buendia	Ultraelectromagneticpop!	5:26	1993	
"Paru-Parong Ningning"	Ely Buendia; Marcus Adoro; Raimund Marasigan	Cutterpillow	2:47	1995	
"Peace It Together"	Ely Buendia; Marcus Adoro; Buddy Zabala; Raimund Marasigan	Natin99	7:14	1999	
"Photo Synth"	Raimund Marasigan	Carbon Stereoxide	0:32	2001	
"Playground"	Raimund Marasigan	Carbon Stereoxide	4:12	2001	
"Please Transpose"	-	Please Transpose	0:08	2002	
"Police Woman"	Ely Buendia; Raimund Marasigan; Marcus Adoro; Buddy Zabala	Bananatype	5:06	1997	
"Poorman's Grave"	Ely Buendia	Cutterpillow	4:36	1995	
"Pop Machine"	Ely Buendia	Natin99	5:39	1999	
"Prof. Banlaoi’s Transcendental Medication After Every Six Months or Punk Zappa Three"	Marcus Adoro	Circus	1:53	1994	
"Prologue"	Ely Buendia; Raimund Marasigan	Sticker Happy	0:27	1997	
"Pula"	Marcus Adoro	Carbon Stereoxide	5:26	2001	
"Pumapatak Ang Ulan" (APO Hiking Society cover)	Danny Javier ‡	Nescafé Open Up Party Live	2:24	2000	
"Punk Zappa"	Marcus Adoro	Circus	0:10	1994	
"Rise and Shine"	Ely Buendia	Fruitcake	3:32	1996	
"Run Barbi Run"	-	Best OPM Collection Volume 4	2:54	1995	
"Sa Wakas"	Ely Buendia; Annie Angala	Circus	2:35	1994	
"Sa Tollgate"	-	Eraserheads Anthology	2:59	2004	
"Sabado" †	Buddy Zabala; Erwin Romulo; Marcus Adoro; Raimund Marasigan	Sabado/1995	3:22	2014	
"Salamin"	Buddy Zabala	Natin99	3:31	1999	
"Santa Ain’t Comin’ No Mo'"	Ely Buendia	Fruitcake	2:53	1996	
"Saturn Return"	Ely Buendia; Raimund Marasigan	Aloha Milkyway	5:06	1998	
"Scorpio Rising"	Ely Buendia	Aloha Milkyway	5:10	1998	
"Sembreak"	Raimund Marasigan	Circus	4:04	1994	
"Shadow"	Ely Buendia	Fruitcake	2:38	1996	
"Shadow Boxes Accountants"	Buddy Zabala	Fruitcake	1:02	1996	
"Shadow Reads the News Today, Oh Boy"	Buddy Zabala	Fruitcake	0:27	1996	
"shadow@buttholesurfs.com"	Buddy Zabala	Fruitcake	1:04	1996	
"Shake Yer Head"	Ely Buendia	Ultraelectromagneticpop!	4:04	1993	
"Shirley" †	Ely Buendia; Raimund Marasigan	Ultraelectromagneticpop!	3:58	1993	
"Sino sa Atin"	Raimund Marasigan	Natin99	3:03	1999	
"Sinturong Pangkaligtasan"	Raimund Marasigan	Natin99	2:29	1999	
"Slo Mo"	Ely Buendia; Marcus Adoro; Buddy Zabala; Raimund Marasigan	Cutterpillow	3:24	1995	
"Small Room"	Raimund Marasigan	Aloha Milkyway	3:15	1998	
"Sori"	Marcus Adoro	Pop-U! (unreleased demo)	4:06	1991	
"South Superhighway"	Marcus Adoro	Natin99	4:10	1999	
"Spoliarium"	Ely Buendia	Sticker Happy	5:26	1997	
"Sticker Happy"	Raimund Marasigan	Sticker Happy	2:29	1997	
"Styrosnow"	Ely Buendia	Fruitcake	2:15	1996	
"Super Vision"	Raimund Marasigan	Carbon Stereoxide	0:18	2001	
"Superproxy (feat. Francis M.)"	Ely Buendia; Francis Magalona	Cutterpillow	5:45	1995	
"Tama Ka"	Buddy Zabala; Earnest Mangulabnan	Natin99	3:20	1999	
"Tamagotchi Baby" †	Ely Buendia; Raimund Marasigan	Aloha Milkyway	4:40	1998	
"Tapsilogue"	Ely Buendia; Raimund Marasigan	Sticker Happy	0:39	1997	
"Tikman"	Ely Buendia; Raimund Marasigan	Bananatype	2:54	1997	
"Tindahan ni Aling Nena"	Ely Buendia	Ultraelectromagneticpop!	3:06	1993	
"Torpedo"	Ely Buendia	Cutterpillow	4:17	1995	
"Toyang" †	Marcus Adoro; Ely Buendia	Ultraelectromagneticpop!	3:48	1993	
"Trip to Jerusalem"	Ely Buendia	Fruitcake	6:15	1996	
"Tuwing Umuulan at Kapiling Ka" (Basil Valdez cover)	Ryan Cayabyab ‡	The Silver Album	4:43	1996	
"U Make Me" †	-	Please Transpose	3:23	2002	
"Ultrasound"	Ely Buendia	Carbon Stereoxide	4:21	2001	
"Venus in the Country"	Raimund Marasigan; Ely Buendia	Pop-U! (unreleased demo)	4:05	1991	
"Waiting for the Bus"	Ely Buendia	Cutterpillow	3:27	1995	
"Wala"	Marcus Adoro	Carbon Stereoxide	7:14	2001	
"Walang Nagbago"	Ely Buendia	Cutterpillow	3:24	1995	
"Wating"	Ely Buendia	Circus	4:17	1995	
"Wishing Wells"	Raimund Marasigan	Circus	3:33	1995	
"With a Smile" †	Ely Buendia	Circus	4:39	1994	
"Yoko"	Raimund Marasigan	Cutterpillow	3:10	1995	
