= Eraserheads Anthology =

Anthology

Greatest hits album by Eraserheads
- Released: January 23, 2004
- Recorded: 1990–2001
- Genre: Alternative rock; indie rock; pop rock
- Length: 70:14 (disc 1); 75:48 (disc 2)
- Label: Musiko Records; BMG Records (Pilipinas), Inc.
- Producer: Robin Rivera; Eraserheads; Ed Formoso; Dem
- Compiler: Vic Valenciano

Eraserheads chronology
Please Transpose EP (2002)	Anthology (2004)	Eraserheads Anthology Two (2006)

Eraserheads Anthology is a greatest hits album of the Philippine alternative rock band Eraserheads. It was released by BMG Records (Pilipinas), Inc. in 2004. It was the band's first greatest hits album since their breakup in 2002, and features the unreleased track "Sa Tollgate", recorded in 1998.

== Track listing ==
Disc one
No.	Title	Album	Length
1.	"Ligaya"	Ultraelectromagneticpop!, 1993	4:31
2.	"Pare Ko"	Ultraelectromagneticpop!; censored radio version (“Walang Hiyang Pare Ko”)	5:25
3.	"Toyang"	Ultraelectromagneticpop!	3:45
4.	"Minsan"	Circus, 1994	4:17
5.	"Overdrive"	Cutterpillow, 1995	5:08
6.	"Kailan"	Circus	3:17
7.	"Sembreak"	Circus	4:06
8.	"Ang Huling El Bimbo"	Cutterpillow	7:30
9.	"Alapaap"	Circus	4:25
10.	"With a Smile"	Circus	4:40
11.	"Magasin"	Circus	4:12
12.	"Superproxy (feat. Francis M.)"	Cutterpillow	5:47
13.	"Torpedo"	Cutterpillow	4:17
14.	"Huwag Mo Nang Itanong"	Cutterpillow	4:12
15.	"Kamasupra"	Cutterpillow	4:38
Total length:			1:10:14

Disc two
No.	Title	Album	Length
1.	"Kaliwete"	Sticker Happy, 1997	3:09
2.	"Hard to Believe"	Sticker Happy; edited version	3:34
3.	"Para sa Masa"	Sticker Happy	4:55
4.	"Bogchi Hokbu"	Sticker Happy	4:20
5.	"Maselang Bahaghari"	Natin99, 1999	3:31
6.	"Pop Machine"	Natin99	5:40
7.	"Huwag Kang Matakot"	Natin99	3:12
8.	"Maskara"	Carbon Stereoxide, 2001	4:13
9.	"Hula"	Carbon Stereoxide	3:08
10.	"Julie Tearjerky"	Aloha Milkyway, 1998	3:35
11.	"Fruitcake"	Single version; from album Fruitcake, 1996	4:37
12.	"Trip to Jerusalem"	Fruitcake; edited version	5:27
13.	"Tuwing Umuulan at Kapiling Ka"	The Silver Album, 1997	4:43
14.	"Run Barbi Run"	Theme song from Run Barbi Run (1995)	2:54
15.	"Police Woman"	Bananatype, 1997	5:07
16.	"Tamagotchi Baby"	Aloha Milkyway	4:37
17.	"Harana"	Bananatype	6:05
18.	"Sa Tollgate"	Previously unreleased	2:59
Total length:			1:15:48

All tracks are written by Ely Buendia, with:

- "Toyang" co-written with Marcus Adoro
- "Overdrive" and "Tamagotchi Baby" co-written with Raymund Marasigan
- "Superproxy" co-written with Francis Magalona
- "Run Barbi Run" and "Police Woman" co-written with Adoro, Marasigan, and Zabala
- "Kailan" co-written with Marasigan, Adoro, Hector Zabala, Annie Angala, Karing Evangelista, and Auraeus Solito

and except:

- "Sembreak" written by Marasigan
- "Tuwing Umuulan at Kapiling Ka" written by Ryan Cayabyab

== Personnel ==
Eraserheads

- Ely Buendia – lead vocals, guitar
- Buddy Zabala – bass guitar
- Marcus Adoro – lead guitar
- Raimund Marasigan – drums

Technical staff

- Robin Rivera – producer
- Ed Formoso – producer (1, 2)
