= Eraserheads Anthology Two =

Anthology Two

Greatest hits album by Eraserheads
- Released: August 16, 2006
- Recorded: 1993–2001
- Genre: Alternative rock; indie rock; pop rock; Christmas
- Length: 51:35 (disc 1); 63:55 (disc 2)
- Label: Musiko Records; Sony BMG Music Entertainment (Philippines) Inc.
- Producer: Robin Rivera; Eraserheads; Ed Formoso; Dem
- Compiler: Vic Valenciano

Eraserheads chronology
Eraserheads Anthology (2004)	Anthology Two (2006)	Eraserheads: The Reunion Concert 08.30.08 (2008)

Eraserheads Anthology Two is a greatest hits album of the Philippine alternative rock band Eraserheads. It was released by BMG Records (Pilipinas), Inc. in 2006 as a sequel to the 2004 compilation album Eraserheads Anthology.

Anthology Two features several tracks from their studio albums as well as two bonus tracks from the 1994 album Circus and the non-album track "Casa Fantastica", first featured in the 1996 compilation album 1896: Ang Pagsilang.

== Track listing ==
Disc one
No.	Title	Album	Length
1.	"Tindahan Ni Aling Nena"	Ultraelectromagneticpop!, 1993	3:07
2.	"Shirley"	Ultraelectromagneticpop!	4:02
3.	"Shake Yer Head"	Ultraelectromagneticpop!	4:05
4.	"Hey, Jay"	Circus, 1994	4:141
5.	"Alkohol"	Circus	2:55
6.	"Wishing Wells"	Circus	3:35
7.	"Butterscotch"	Circus	4:38
8.	"Sa Wakas"	Circus	2:38
9.	"Wating"	Bonus track from Circus	4:16
10.	"Kailan Lounge"	Bonus track from Circus	3:19
11.	"Waiting for the Bus"	Cutterpillow, 1995	3:17
12.	"Paru-Parong Ningning"	Cutterpillow	2:50
13.	"Poorman's Grave"	Cutterpillow	4:38
14.	"Walang Nagbago"	Cutterpillow	3:24
Total length:			51:35

Disc two
No.	Title	Album	Length
1.	"Casa Fantastica"	1896: Ang Pagsilang, 1996	5:17
2.	"Futuristic"	Sticker Happy, 1997	2:55
3.	"Balikbayan Box"	Sticker Happy	5:16
4.	"Andalusian Dog"	Sticker Happy	5:05
5.	"Ha Ha Ha"	Sticker Happy	4:46
6.	"Spoliarium"	Sticker Happy	5:31
7.	"Tikman"	Bananatype, 1997	2:59
8.	"Saturn Return"	Aloha Milkyway, 1998	5:05
9.	"Scorpio Rising"	Aloha Milkyway	5:11
10.	"Tama Ka"	Natin99, 1999	3:24
11.	"68 Dr. Sixto Antonio Avenue"	Natin99	5:38
12.	"Palamig"	Carbon Stereoxide, 2001	4:27
13.	"Playground"	Carbon Stereoxide	4:16
14.	"Christmas Party"	Fruitcake, 1996	4:05
Total length:			1:03:55

== Personnel ==
Eraserheads

- Ely Buendia – lead vocals, guitar
- Buddy Zabala – bass guitar
- Marcus Adoro – lead guitar
- Raimund Marasigan – drums

Technical staff

- Robin Rivera – producer
- Ed Formoso – producer (1, 3)
