= Eraserheads: The Reunion Concert 08.30.08 =

Live album by Eraserheads
- Released: November 3, 2008
- Recorded: August 30, 2008
- Venue: Bonifacio Global City Open Grounds
- Genre: Alternative rock; indie rock; pop rock
- Length: 65:28
- Label: Sony BMG Music Entertainment (Philippines)
- Producer: Romel "Sancho" Sanchez

Eraserheads chronology
Eraserheads Anthology Two (2006)	Eraserheads: The Reunion Concert 08.30.08 (2008)	The Heads Set (2010)

Eraserheads: The Reunion Concert 08.30.08 is the first live album by the Philippine alternative rock band Eraserheads, released on November 3, 2008, by Sony BMG Music Entertainment (Philippines). The album was recorded at the band's first reunion concert at the Bonifacio Global City Open Grounds on August 30, 2008.

An accompanying concert film was released in theaters in the same month.

== Background ==
In July 2008, the band confirmed they would reunite for a concert at the CCP Open Grounds on August 30. Initially sponsored by Philip Morris, the company later backed out after facing criminal charges by the Philippine Department of Health (DOH) for violating the Tobacco Regulation Act of 2003 prohibiting tobacco companies from sponsoring artistic events; they had also promised a free but invitation-only show for adults and smokers. The concert was later sponsored by Radiohead Productions with tickets being sold and the venue moved to the Bonifacio Global City Open Grounds in Taguig.

== Concert ==
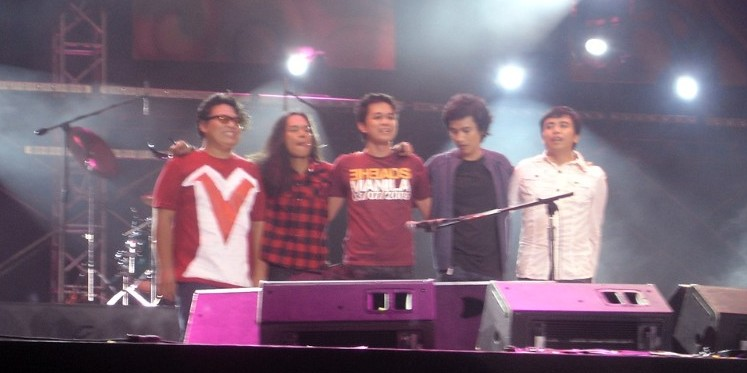
Eraserheads at "The Final Set" Reunion Concert: (R to L) Buddy Zabala, Ely Buendia, Raimund Marasigan and Marcus Adoro together with Jazz Nicolas of Itchyworms (far left) as their session player

The band went ahead with the reunion concert as planned, with Jazz Nicolas of Itchyworms joining in as session musician. They played 15 songs in the first set, with most of the setlist focusing on the band's first three albums.

During the 20-minute intermission, Buendia's sister Lally announced that the concert was being cut short due to her brother experiencing chest pains and that he was being rushed to Makati Medical Center for extreme exhaustion. The remaining band members went to Saguijo and played what would have been the second set of the concert, with Ebe Dancel on vocals.

Buendia later recovered after an angioplasty. The band later went on a second reunion concert in March 2009.

== Track listing ==
No.	Title	Original release	Length
1.	"Alapaap"	Circus	5:27
2.	"Ligaya"	Ultraelectromagneticpop!	3:46
3.	"Sembreak"	Circus	3:56
4.	"Hey, Jay"	Circus	4:26
5.	"Harana"	Bananatype	5:57
6.	"Fruitcake"	Fruitcake	4:37
7.	"Toyang"	Ultraelectromagneticpop!	4:10
8.	"Kamasupra"	Cutterpillow	4:36
9.	"Kailan"	Circus	3:27
10.	"Huwag Kang Matakot"	Natin99	3:04
11.	"Kaliwete"	Sticker Happy	3:03
12.	"With A Smile"	Circus	5:22
13.	"Shake Yer Head"	Ultraelectromagneticpop!	3:44
14.	"Huwag Mo Nang Itanong"	Cutterpillow	4:24
15.	"Lightyears"	Fruitcake	4:31
Total length:			65:28

== Personnel ==
Eraserheads

- Ely Buendia – lead vocals, guitar
- Buddy Zabala – bass guitar
- Marcus Adoro – lead guitar
- Raimund Marasigan – drums

with

- Jazz Nicolas – session musician
- Angee Rozul – mixing, engineering, mastering
