= Eraserheads: The Singles =

Greatest hits album by Eraserheads
- Released: 2001
- Recorded: 1993–1997
- Genre: Alternative rock; indie rock; pop rock
- Length: 70:46
- Label: Musiko Records; BMG Records (Pilipinas) Inc.

Eraserheads chronology
Carbon Stereoxide (2001)	Eraserheads: The Singles (2001)	Please Transpose (2002)

Eraserheads: The Singles is a compilation album by the Philippine alternative rock band Eraserheads. It was released by BMG Records (Pilipinas), Inc. in 2001 as part of their "Himig Ng Dekada 90" series of budget compilations, which also featured BMG artists such as Yano, Color It Red, Rivermaya, and Francis M.

Professional ratings
Review scores
Source	Rating
Allmusic	2.5/5 stars

== Track listing ==
All tracks are written by Ely Buendia except "Overdrive" co-written with Raymund Marasigan, "Kailan" co-written with Marasigan, Marcus Adoro, Hector Zabala, Annie Angala, Karing Evangelista, and Auraeus Solito, and "Toyang" co-written with Adoro

No.	Title	Original album	Length
1.	"Overdrive"	Cutterpillow (1995)	5:05
2.	"Alapaap"	Circus (1994)	4:22
3.	"Ang Huling El Bimbo"	Cutterpillow	7:29
4.	"Ligaya"	Ultraelectromagneticpop! (1993)	4:31
5.	"With a Smile"	Circus	4:37
6.	"Harana"	Bananatype EP (1997)	6:04
7.	"Kailan"	Circus	3:14
8.	"Magasin"	Circus	4:08
9.	"Pare Ko"	Ultraelectromagneticpop!	5:25
10.	"Torpedo"	Cutterpillow	4:17
11.	"Toyang"	Ultraelectromagneticpop!	3:49
12.	"Minsan"	Circus	4:14
13.	"Huwag Mo Nang Itanong"	Cutterpillow	4:11
14.	"Fruitcake"	Fruitcake (1996)	4:37
15.	"Tuwing Umuulan at Kapiling Ka"	The Silver Album (1996)	4:43
Total length:			70:46

== Personnel ==
Eraserheads

- Ely Buendia – lead vocals, guitar
- Buddy Zabala – bass guitar
- Marcus Adoro – lead guitar
- Raimund Marasigan – drums

Technical staff

- Robin Rivera – producer
- Ed Formoso – producer (4, 9)
