= Please Transpose =

Please Transpose EP

EP by Eraserheads
- Released: August 2002
- Recorded: 2002
- Studio: Buddy, Marcus and Kris' homes; Thirdline Studios; the Squid Crib
- Genre: Alternative rock; indie rock; pop rock
- Length: 24:25
- Producer: Eraserheads

Eraserheads chronology
Eraserheads: The Singles (2001)	Please Transpose EP (2002)	Eraserheads Anthology (2004)

Please Transpose is the third and final extended play by the Philippine alternative rock band Eraserheads (credited as Eheads). Released in August 2002, it was self-produced by the band with their new vocalist Kris Gorra-Dancel, who joined the group after Ely Buendia left earlier that year.

== Background ==
Eraserheads released their seventh studio album Carbon Stereoxide in March 2001. Vocalist Ely Buendia left the band a year later, having missed two live shows, with drummer Raimund Marasigan filling in for him. The band later debuted with a new vocalist, Kris Gorra-Dancel of Fatal Posporos, at Hard Rock Manila in April.

The band had considered changing their name but decided to wait. "It gets more gigs than a new name,” Marasigan explained. “We don't need to prove anything by getting a new name. We earned the name."

== Content ==
The EP features five new songs intended to gauge interest for an upcoming album with Gorra-Dancel under a new name. “U Make Me” was released as the lead single, with a Dogme 95-inspired music video directed by Marie Jamora and featuring camerawork from Sandwich vocalist Marc Abaya and filmmakers Joe Fab and Quark Henares. The EP also features re-recordings of Eraserheads songs “Paru-parong Ningning” from Cutterpillow (1995) and “Dahan Dahan” from Natin99 (1999).

The title refers to the band having to perform their songs in a higher key due to Gorra-Dancel’s vocal range.

== Release ==
The EP was distributed to a small group of industry insiders and friends at a listening party at Butch Dans's studio in August.

Adoro left the band in November, and the planned album was scrapped. Instead, the band recruited Ebe Dancel of Sugarfree and Diego Mapa of Monsterbot and renamed the band Cambio. They later released their debut album Derby Light in 2004.

== Track listing ==
No.	Title	Length
1.	"Please Transpose"	0:08
2.	"U Make Me"	3:23
3.	"Everything Is"	4:24
4.	"I Centric"	3:03
5.	"Lahat"	3:27
6.	"It's Not"	4:47
7.	"Dahan Dahan"	2:31
8.	"Paru-parong Ningning"	2:42
Total length:		24:25

== Personnel ==
Eraserheads

- Kris Gorra-Dancel - lead vocalist, rhythm guitar
- Marcus Adoro - lead guitar
- Buddy Zabala - bass guitar
- Raimund Marasigan - drums
