= Aloha Milkyway =

Compilation album by Eraserheads
- Released: August 8, 1998
- Recorded: 1994 – 1998
- Studios: Tracks, Pasig; JR, Makati (track 13 & 14)
- Genres: Alternative rock; indie rock; pop rock
- Length: 66:47
- Labels: Greater East Asia Music; BMG Records (Pilipinas) Inc.
- Producer: Robin Rivera

Eraserheads chronology
Sticker Happy (1997)	Aloha Milkyway (1998)	Natin99 (1999)

Singles from Aloha Milkyway
- 1. "Julie Tearjerky" Released: August 1998; 2. "Tamagotchi Baby" Released: February 1999; 3. "With a Smile" Released: May 1999

Professional ratings
Review scores
Source	Rating
Allmusic	3/5 stars

Aloha Milkyway is a compilation album by the Philippine alternative rock band Eraserheads. It was released on August 12, 1998, under BMG Records (Pilipinas) Inc. in Southeast Asian territories and in the Philippines on October 14.

The album features the promotional singles “Julie Tearjerky”, “Tamagotchi Baby”, and "With a Smile" from the band's 1994 album Circus.

== Content ==
The album contains five new tracks. Lead single “Julie Tearjerky” charted at number one in South Korea, Hong Kong, Taiwan, Japan, and Indonesia. Oh, Flamingo! later covered the song in 2019 for Pop Machine the Album. The band first performed “Tamagotchi Baby” at the Asia Live Dream '98 for NHK in Tokyo, Japan, where they sang it as “Tama Sushi Baby” to avoid broadcasting issues with the Tamagotchi digital pet brand. "Scorpio Rising" was re-recorded from the Pop-U! demo tape. “Small Room” is an instrumental filler by Marasigan that samples several Eraserheads songs.

Aloha Milkyway also features select English language tracks from the band's previous albums Fruitcake (1996) and Sticker Happy (1997) as well as "With a Smile" from Circus (1994), which was also released as a single. It also includes "Ang Huling El Bimbo" from Cutterpillow (1995), the only song in Tagalog, due to the band having won the MTV Asia's Viewers Choice Award at the MTV Video Music Awards for its music video the previous year.

== Release and promotion ==
The initial pressing for Aloha Milkyway in Singapore at 400 copies sold out on its first day of release. It went on to sell 1,000 copies there and in Indonesia. The band later toured at Singapore in September to promote the album.

In the Philippines, the album sold 20,000 copies on its first day of release in October.

In 2008, BMG reissued Eraserheads's back catalogue, including Aloha Milkyway.

== Track listing ==
Aloha Milkyway (Note: In the cassette edition, side one runs from Julie Tearjerky to Trip to Jerusalem, while side two runs from Andalusian Dog to Ang Huling El Bimbo.)
No.	Title	Writer(s)	Original Release	Length
1.	"Julie Tearjerky"	Ely Buendia		3:37
2.	"Tamagotchi Baby"	Buendia; Raimund Marasigan		4:40
3.	"Saturn Return"	Buendia; Marasigan		5:06
4.	"Scorpio Rising"	Buendia		5:10
5.	"Milk And Money"	Buendia	Sticker Happy (1997)	4:42
6.	"Downtown"	Marasigan	Sticker Happy (1997)	4:30
7.	"Trip to Jerusalem"	Buendia	single version from Fruitcake (1996)	5:30
8.	"Andalusian Dog"	Buendia	Sticker Happy (1997)	5:05
9.	"Hard to Believe"	Buendia	edited version from the Electric City Mixes promotional single(1997); original from Sticker Happy(1997)	3:24
10.	"Fruitcake"	Buendia	single version from the Fruitcake EP (1996) (Note: This version ends with the lines "A little lovin and some fruit to bake/Life is a piece of cake," as well as ending on a guitar chord. On the other hand, the album version starts with the album's final track, "Merry Christmas Everybody Happy New Year Too", in reverse, and ends with the lines "A little girl is riding all alone/She ran away from home," as it segues to the next album track, "Shadow".)	4:38
11.	"Small Room"	Marasigan		3:15
12.	"Ambi Dextrose"	Buendia	Sticker Happy (1997)	4:55
13.	"With a Smile"	Buendia	Circus (1994)	4:41
14.	"Ang Huling El Bimbo"	Buendia	Cutterpillow (1995)	7:27
Total length:				66:47

== Personnel ==
Adapted from the liner notes.

Eraserheads

- Ely Buendia - vocals, guitars
- Buddy Zabala - bass, back-up vocals
- Marcus Adoro - lead guitar
- Raimund Marasigan - drums, vocals (tracks 2, 3)

Production

- Robin Rivera - production
- Angee Rozul - recording, mixing
- Lito Palco - recording, mixing (tracks 13, 14)
- Rudy Tee - executive production
- Vic Valenciano - A&R
- Romel Sanchez - A&R

Design

- Cynthia Bauzon - sleeve design
- Dino Ignacio - art direction
