= Cutterpillow: Tribute Album =

2025 studio album by various artists

Studio album tribute to Eraserheads by various artists
- Released: May 30, 2025
- Recorded: 2025
- Genres: Alternative rock; indie rock; pop rock
- Length: 66:07
- Label: Offshore Music

Cutterpillow: Tribute Album is a tribute album to the Philippine rock band Eraserheads and their 1995 studio album Cutterpillow. The tribute album, made in celebration of the album's 30th anniversary, features covers of all tracks from Cutterpillow performed by artists signed to Eraserheads vocalist Ely Buendia's record label Offshore Music. It was released by Offshore Music on May 30, 2025.

== Background ==
The tribute album was released as part of a year-long celebration of the 30th anniversary of Eraserheads's third studio album Cutterpillow, which was the band's most commercially successful record in the Philippines. It was preceded by a limited vinyl release remastered by Bernie Grundman in 2024 and a limited run of merchandise illustrated by Tarantadong Kalbo based on the album artwork.

In a press statement, Buendia stated: “We didn’t set any parameters. We just told the artists that it was a tribute album, and they can interpret it as they see fit.” Offshore Music’s General Manager Audry Dionisio added: “Each artist was given complete creative freedom.” Buendia’s bandmates Raimund Marasigan, Buddy Zabala and Marcus Adoro provided input on some of the tracks, according to Dionisio.

Aside from the album release, Offshore Music released a biweekly documentary series on YouTube in 2025 showing behind-the-scenes footage from the recording sessions and interviews with the artists and producers involved.

== Track listing ==
All tracks are written by Ely Buendia, except where noted. Recording artists in parentheses.

Cutterpillow: Tribute Album track listing
No.	Title	Writer(s)	Length
1.	"Superproxy" (Amateurish featuring Stef Aranas)	Buendia; Francis Magalona	6:27
2.	"Back2Me" (Diego's Scenes, Ligaya Escueta)	Buendia; Marcus Adoro; Raimund Marasigan	3:36
3.	"Waiting for the Bus" (MI MI, Eliza Marie)		4:50
4.	"Fine Time" (Sansette)	Marasigan	4:23
5.	"Kama Supra" (Seedy and the Years)		4:45
6.	"Overdrive" (Juicebox)	Buendia; Marasigan	3:57
7.	"Slo Mo" (GundamFunk)	Buendia; Adoro; Buddy Zabala; Marasigan	4:07
8.	"Torpedo" (Elton Clark)		4:04
9.	"Huwag Mo Nang Itanong" (ALYSON)		4:39
10.	"Paru-Parong Ningning" (Her Name Is Noelle)	Buendia; Adoro; Marasigan	2:58
11.	"Walang Nagbago" (Carousel Casualties)		3:05
12.	"Poorman's Grave" (Aviators)		4:42
13.	"Yoko" (neytan)	Marasigan	2:54
14.	"Fill Her" (Pixie Labrador)	Buendia; Marasigan	1:59
15.	"Ang Huling El Bimbo" (Pinkmen)		6:10
16.	"Cutterpillow" (Ena Mori)		2:17
17.	"Overdrive (Reprise)" (Offshore Music Artists)	Buendia; Marasigan	1:14
Total length:			66:07
