= 1995 (song) =

Single by Eraserheads
- A-side: "Sabado"
- Released: September 1, 2014
- Recorded: 2014
- Studio: Sound Creation Studios/Kodama Studios; The Bunker/Crow’s Nest
- Genre: Pinoy rock; alternative rock
- Length: 3:22
- Songwriters: Ely Buendia; Erwin Romulo
- Producers: Erwin Romulo; Eraserheads

Eraserheads singles chronology
"U Make Me" (2002)	"Sabado" / "1995" (2014)

Music video
- "1995" on YouTube

"1995" is a song by the Philippine alternative rock band Eraserheads. It was released in 2014 as part of a two-track CD included with the September issue of the Philippine edition of Esquire magazine, along with “Sabado”. The songs are the band's first new material in 12 years.

== Background ==
The songs were initiated by Esquire Philippines editor in chief Erwin Romulo when he followed the band during their one-night show in London in April 2014. “We wanted to find out what the band would sound like today,” he recalled. “It’s not a comeback. It’s an experiment.”

Romulo co-wrote “1995” with vocalist Ely Buendia. It was described as a “Lemonheads-esque throwback to the band’s dalliances with punk”.

The sleeve cover was designed by Cynthia Bauzon-Arre and features color blocks with an inverted E, a symbol for the band.

== Release ==
"Sabado" and "1995" were first released as part of a CD insert of Esquire's September 2014 issue. The magazine cover shows the band crossing the Abbey Road in a homage to the Beatles. The songs were also made available for playback online for the month of September through the magazine's online version.

The band held a surprise live performance during the issue's launch party at Dusit Thani Hotel in Makati.

In October 2021, Offshore Music released the songs on 12-inch vinyl with exclusive remixes.

== Music video ==
The music video for “1995” was directed by Erik Matti. It features the band performing with "psychedelic" motion graphics, ending with them standing in front of the Oblation statue from University of the Philippines Diliman, where the band formed.

== Track listing ==
=== 12” vinyl ===
Side A
No.	Title	Length
1.	"Sabado"	3:22
2.	"Sabado (DMAPS Remix)"

Side B
No.	Title	Length
1.	"1995"	3:53
2.	"1995 (Lustbass Remix)"

== Personnel ==
Eraserheads

- Ely Buendia – lead vocals, guitar
- Buddy Zabala – bass guitar
- Marcus Adoro – lead guitar
- Raimund Marasigan – drums

Additional musicians

- RJ Pineda - keyboards (track 4)

Production

- Erwin Romulo - producer
- Shinji Tanaka - recording, mixing, mastering
- Sancho Sanchez - additional recording, production coordination
- Ely Buendia - executive producer (2021 release)
- Derick Villarino - executive producer (2021 release)
- Pat Sarabia - executive producer (2012 release)

Design

- Cynthia Bauzon-Arre - original art and design
- Ennuh Tiu - cover photography (2021 release)
- Jake Versoza - inner sleeve photographs (2021 release)
- Brian Gorospe - layout and design (2021 release)
