= Sabado (Eraserheads song) =

Single by Eraserheads
- B-side: "1995"
- Released: September 1, 2014
- Recorded: 2014
- Studio: Sound Creation Studios/Kodama Studios; The Bunker/Crow’s Nest
- Genre: Pinoy rock; alternative rock
- Length: 3:22
- Songwriters: Buddy Zabala; Erwin Romulo; Marcus Adoro; Raimund Marasigan
- Producers: Erwin Romulo; Eraserheads

Eraserheads singles chronology
"U Make Me" (2002)	"Sabado" / "1995" (2014)

Music video
- "Sabado" on YouTube

"Sabado" (lit. 'Saturday') is a song by the Philippine alternative rock band Eraserheads. It was released in 2014 as part of a two-track CD included with the September issue of the Philippine edition of Esquire magazine, along with “1995”. The songs are the band's first new material in 12 years.

== Background ==
The songs were initiated by Esquire Philippines editor in chief Erwin Romulo when he followed the band during their one-night show in London in April 2014. “We wanted to find out what the band would sound like today,” he recalled. “It’s not a comeback. It’s an experiment.”

Previously unreleased, "Sabado" was co-written by Romulo with bassist Buddy Zabala, guitarist Marcus Adoro, and drummer Raimund Marasigan. It was described as a “pop ditty” about the weekend.

The sleeve cover was designed by Cynthia Bauzon-Arre and features color blocks with an inverted E, a symbol for the band.

== Release ==
"Sabado" and "1995" were first released as part of a CD insert of Esquire's September 2014 issue. The magazine cover shows the band crossing the Abbey Road in a homage to the Beatles. The songs were also made available for playback online for the month of September through the magazine's online version.

The band held a surprise live performance during the issue's launch party at Dusit Thani Hotel in Makati.

In October 2021, Offshore Music released the songs on 12-inch vinyl with exclusive remixes.

== Music video ==
The music video for “Sabado” was directed by Erik Matti. It featured two best friends (Ketchup Eusebio and RK Bagatsing) crashing a house party.

== Track listing ==
=== 12” vinyl ===
Side A
No.	Title	Length
1.	"Sabado"	3:22
2.	"Sabado (DMAPS Remix)"

Side B
No.	Title	Length
1.	"1995"	3:53
2.	"1995 (Lustbass Remix)"

== Personnel ==
Eraserheads

- Ely Buendia – lead vocals, guitar
- Buddy Zabala – bass guitar
- Marcus Adoro – lead guitar
- Raimund Marasigan – drums

Additional musicians

- RJ Pineda - keyboards (track 4)

Production

- Erwin Romulo - producer
- Shinji Tanaka - recording, mixing, mastering
- Sancho Sanchez - additional recording, production coordination
- Ely Buendia - executive producer (2021 release)
- Derick Villarino - executive producer (2021 release)
- Pat Sarabia - executive producer (2012 release)

Design

- Cynthia Bauzon-Arre - original art and design
- Ennuh Tiu - cover photography (2021 release)
- Jake Versoza - inner sleeve photographs (2021 release)
- Brian Gorospe - layout and design (2021 release)
