= Cambio (band) =

Filipino rock band

- Origin: Manila, Philippines
- Genres: Alternative rock; Indie rock; Pinoy rock; Indie pop
- Years active: 2003–2007
- Labels: MCA Music
- Spinoff of: Eraserheads; Pedicab; Sugarfree; Monsterbot; Fatal Posporos
- Past members: Kris Gorra-Dancel; Ebe Dancel; Diego Mapa; Buddy Zabala; Raimund Marasigan

Cambio was a Filipino rock group founded in 2003. The band is composed of former Eheads members Raimund Marasigan, Buddy Zabala and Kris Gorra-Dancel with Ebe Dancel and Diego Mapa.

== History ==
When Ely Buendia left the Eraserheads sometime in 2002, remaining members Buddy Zabala, Marcus Adoro and Raimund Marasigan decided to continue as an abbreviated "Eheads" by adding singer-guitarist Kris Gorra (from the indie punk girl group, Fatal Posporos). After just a few months, Marcus Adoro left the Eheads as well to indulge in his hobby-sport, surfing, and to pursue his own musical project, Markus Highway.

Despite their setbacks, Zabala, Marasigan and Gorra (later, Gorra-Dancel, upon marrying Vin Dancel from Twisted Halo) decided to continue on, with the addition of Ebe Dancel (Kris Gorra-Dancel's brother-in-law) from Sugarfree and Diego Mapa from Monsterbot; consequently forming Cambio.

Cambio became known for songs identified with Pinoy pop culture, such as "DV" (about Divisoria, a sub-district in Manila popular for bargain-hunting), and "Call Center" (about business process outsourcing employment in the Philippines).

== Band members ==
- Kris Gorra-Dancel – lead vocals, rhythm guitar
- Ebe Dancel – co-lead vocals, lead guitar
- Diego Mapa – rhythm guitar, keyboard synthesizer, vocals
- Buddy Zabala – bass guitar
- Raimund Marasigan – drums, percussions

== Discography ==
Albums

- Derby Light (2004)
- Matic (2007)

EPs

- Excerpt EP (2003)

== Awards ==
Year	Award giving body	Category	Nominated work	Results
2004	NU Rock Awards	Bassist of the Year	(for Buddy Zabala)	Won
