= Poorman's Grave =

Song by Eraserheads

from the album Cutterpillow
- Released: December 8, 1995
- Recorded: 1995
- Genre: Pinoy rock; alternative rock
- Length: 4:36
- Label: Musiko Records; BMG Records (Pilipinas), Inc.
- Songwriter: Ely Buendia
- Producer: Robin Rivera

"Poorman’s Grave" is a song by the Philippine alternative rock band Eraserheads from their third album Cutterpillow (1995).

== Composition ==
The song was one of the first songs written by Ely Buendia before the Pop-U! demo tape. It was described as “dark, somber, and morbid” set to an “uppity beat” with rockabilly elements. The band was not able to record the song due to its dark subject matter prior to Cutterpillow. “Dehins siya bagay sa dalawang naunang albums in terms of sound and messages na gusto naming i-impart (It did not fit in our first two albums in terms of sound and messages that we wanted to impart),” said bassist Buddy Zabala.

Buendia wrote the song about his father. He later regarded it as a song he is proud of writing in a 2012 Esquire article: “It came out from a real desire to express something that I felt at that time—which was, to put it bluntly, father issues, and not having the freedom of doing what you want at that age.”"

== Cover versions ==
- The Borrachos covered the song in 2020 as part of Pop Machine the Album.
- Aviators covered the song in 2025 as part of Cutterpillow: Tribute Album.
