= Sticker Happy =

Studio album by Eraserheads
- Released: September 11, 1997
- Recorded: 1997
- Studios: Tracks, Pasig; Cinema Audio, Manila (“Para sa Masa” piano section); EJL, Quezon City (“Prologue” and “Tapsilogue”)
- Genres: Alternative rock; experimental rock
- Length: 67:13
- Labels: Greater East Asia Music; BMG Records (Pilipinas) Inc.
- Producers: Robin Rivera; Eraserheads

Eraserheads chronology
Bananatype (1997)	Sticker Happy (1997)	Aloha Milkyway (1998)

Eraserheads studio album chronology
Fruitcake (1996)	Sticker Happy (1997)	Natin99 (1999)

Singles from Sticker Happy
- 1. "Kaliwete" Released: August 1997; 2. "Hard to Believe" Released: January 1998; 3. "Para sa Masa" Released: April 1998

Sticker Happy is the fifth studio album by the Philippine alternative rock band Eraserheads, released on September 11, 1997, by BMG Records (Pilipinas) Inc.

The album saw the band experimenting with techno and experimental rock genres, incorporating a wide range of instruments and guitar effects. Vocalist Ely Buendia wrote cryptic lyrics in songs such as “Kaliwete”, “Spoliarium”, and “Para sa Masa”.

== Background ==
The band previously released their Christmas-themed fourth studio album Fruitcake in December 1996 to mixed reviews. They started touring outside the Philippines the following year, first performing at BMG Records' Sentosa Pop Festival in Singapore on March. They made their American debut in May, playing several venues in California.

In September, they received MTV Asia's Viewer's Choice Award for their music video for "Ang Huling El Bimbo" at the MTV Video Music Awards in New York City, making them the first Philippine artist to receive such a distinction.

== Recording ==
The band returned to the studio in January 1997 to record songs for Sticker Happy, recording as many as 20 tracks. Some of them, such as “Harana”, were released on the promotional EP Bananatype in June. The band also mixed the songs “Milk and Money”, “Hard to Believe” and “Andalusian Dog” at the Electric Lady Studios in New York City, subsequently releasing the mixes as a promotional single.

The band used a lot of musical gear for Sticker Happy, including synthesizers, samplers, and drum machines. Buendia called it their most personal to date: “Most of our songs speak about our own experiences…Nag-iba ang takbo ng utak namin because of all the traveling (Traveling [overseas] opened up our minds).”

== Music and lyrics ==
Some of the tracks in Sticker Happy, including “Balikbayan Box” and “Downtown”, were inspired by the band's recent US tour in which the former were based on Buendia and guitarist Marcus Adoro's psychedelic experience in San Francisco. Written and performed by drummer Raymund Marasigan, “Downtown” and “Everything They Say” have techno elements. Another Marasigan composition, “Maalalahanin”, was inspired by trip hop and drum and bass, particularly David Bowie’s album Earthling which was released earlier that year.

“Milk and Money” was rerecorded from the Pop-U! demo tape which had a reggae version. Described as a “violent little ditty”, “Andalusian Dog” was also an early composition from the band and named after the 1929 silent short film by Luis Buñuel. Buendia wrote the lead single "Kaliwete" ("left-handed") as well as "Kananete" ("right-handed") and "Ambi Dextrose" (a pun on "ambidextrous") as a challenge to himself after drunkenly telling his friends at a party. “Bogchi Hokbu” was inspired by Santana and features irreverent wordplay spoken by guitarist Marcus Adoro.

“Spoliarium” features a mix of live drums and drum loops. With its cryptic lyrics describing a drunken night out, it became the subject of an urban legend referencing Pepsi Paloma’s rape case in 1982 until Buendia disproved the theory in a podcast interview in 2021. The piano ballad “Para sa Masa” was said to be influenced by the Beatles. Buendia later revealed in a Manila Bulletin interview in 2018 that it was his least favorite song that he wrote: “I’m embarrassed of that song. It’s pretentious. It’s like me telling the masses, ‘I am your savior, but you don’t want to be saved.'”

The band composed the cartoon-themed filler tracks “Prologue” and “Tapsilogue” after they had finished the album. They also added soundbites and inside jokes throughout the record.

== Title and packaging ==
In an interview with Philippine Daily Inquirer, Buendia revealed that the original title was Trigger Happy but that the band wanted it to be less violent. "We all have this hobby of collecting stickers so we called it Sticker Happy," he said.

The cover art of Sticker Happy features Filipino-Iranian TV personality Joey Mead King posing nude in front of Buendia's piano full of stickers and holding a red balloon on an open grass field. Buendia later set fire to the piano at the end of the band's second reunion concert in 2009.

== Release ==
Sticker Happy became commercially successful in the Philippines, where it has sold 120,000 copies as of 1998.

In 2008, BMG reissued Eraserheads's back catalogue, including Sticker Happy. After the band's reunion concert in 2022, it was re-released on streaming services to include 360-degree spatial sound.

== Reception ==
Professional ratings
Review scores
Source	Rating
Allmusic	link

In a retrospective review, David Gonzales of AllMusic gave Sticker Happy three out of five stars. He wrote: "While the album is not as enjoyable nor the melodies as uniformly strong as on Cutterpillow, which remains the band's best album, Sticker Happy has its fine moments."

== Track listing ==
Sticker Happy (Note: In the cassette edition, side one, "Side E", runs from Prologue to Ha Ha Ha, while side two, "Not Side A", runs from Downtown to Tapsilogue.)
No.	Title	Writer(s)	Length
1.	"Prologue"	Ely Buendia; Raymund Marasigan; Buddy Zabala; Robin Rivera	0:27
2.	"Futuristic"	Buendia	2:51
3.	"Kaliwete"	Buendia	3:07
4.	"Milk and Money"	Buendia	4:41
5.	"Bogchi Hokbu"	Buendia; Marcus Adoro; Romel "Sancho" Sanchez	4:18
6.	"Maalalahanin"	Marasigan	3:13
7.	"Balikbayan Box"	Buendia	5:13
8.	"Andalusian Dog"	Buendia	5:01
9.	"Ha Ha Ha"	Buendia	4:42
10.	"Downtown"	Marasigan	4:31
11.	"Kananete"	Buendia	3:17
12.	"Hard to Believe"	Buendia	3:31
13.	"Everything They Say"	Marasigan	3:54
14.	"Spoliarium"	Buendia	5:26
15.	"Ambi Dextrose"	Buendia	4:56
16.	"Para sa Masa"	Buendia	4:57
17.	"Sticker Happy"	Marasigan	2:29
18.	"Tapsilogue"	Buendia; Marasigan; Zabala; Rivera	0:39
Total length:			67:13

== Personnel ==
Adapted from the liner notes.

Eraserheads

- Ely Buendia - vocals (1–5, 7–9, 11–12, 14–16), rhythm guitar, bass guitar (7, 8, 12), acoustic guitar, piano (16), lead guitar (7), samples, EBow (13, 14), percussion
- Buddy Zabala - bass guitar, backing vocals, lead vocals (1), drums (12), spoken word outro (18), keyboards, keyboard percussion (7), rhythm guitar (14), samples
- Marcus Adoro - lead guitar, backing vocals, lead vocals (1), acoustic guitar (16), bass guitar (7), synth (13), samples
- Raymund Marasigan - drums, drum machine, lead vocals (1, 6, 10, 13, 17), percussion, backing vocals, electric guitar (6, 15), bass guitar (7), keyboards, melodica (9), vocoder (10, 13), samples

Additional personnel

- Robin Rivera - spoken word (1, 18), percussion, electronic drums (6)
- Noel Garcia - keyboards, percussion (5)
- unknown - flute (5)
- Mark Villena - spoken word (6)

Production

- Eraserheads – production, mastering, assembly
- Robin Rivera – production, mastering, assembly
- Angee Rozul – mixing, recording
- Eric Lava – mixing (1, 18), recording (1, 18), mastering, assembly
- Dindo Aldecoa – recording (16)

Design

- Dino Ignacio – layout, design (Binary Soup)
- Francis Reyes – art direction
- John Tronco – photography (Ogrudek)
- Joey Mead King – cover model
