= Ang Huling El Bimbo =

Song by Eraserheads

from the album Cutterpillow
- Released: December 8, 1995
- Recorded: 1994
- Genre: Pinoy rock; alternative rock
- Length: 7:30 (full version); 5:30 (radio version)
- Label: Musiko Records; BMG Records (Pilipinas), Inc.
- Songwriter: Ely Buendia
- Producer: Robin Rivera

Audio sample
- "Ang Huling El Bimbo": file; help

Music video
- "Ang Huling El Bimbo" on YouTube

"Ang Huling El Bimbo" (lit. 'The Last El Bimbo"') is a song by the Philippine alternative rock band Eraserheads from their third album Cutterpillow (1995).

== Composition ==
The song is described as a bittersweet "mini-epic" inspired by the Beatles, referencing the actress Paraluman and the tango standard "El Bimbo". "I had a huge crush on this girl who was older; she was the one who taught me the dance, and I think that was the first time I was really in love with a girl. Then I never saw her again,” writer Ely Buendia said about the song in a podcast interview.

The song became the basis for the 2018 musical of the same name. Its title was also used for the band's reunion concert in 2022 and its subsequent world tour.

== Music video ==
The music video was directed by Auraeus Solito and shot at his residence. It premiered on GMA Supershow on February 25, 1996. The video won the band MTV Asia's Viewer's Choice Award at the 1997 MTV Video Music Awards, making them the first Philippine artist to receive such a distinction.

== Personnel ==
- Ely Buendia - lead vocals, rhythm guitar
- Buddy Zabala - bass, harmony vocals, keyboards
- Marcus Adoro - lead guitars, harmony vocals
- Raimund Marasigan - drums
- uncredited - violin

== Covers ==
- Rico J. Puno covered the song for the first Eraserheads tribute album Ultraelectromagneticjam!: The Music of the Eraserheads, released in 2005.
- The CompanY covered the song in 2008.
- Kamikazee recorded an unreleased version of the song in 2009.
- Jay Durias covered the song for the second Eraserheads tribute album, The Reunion: An Eraserheads Tribute Album, released in 2012.
- Janine Berdin performed the song for the Tawag ng Tanghalan singing competition as part of the Philippine noontime show It's Showtime in 2018.
- Sungha Jung covered the song in 2019.
- Ace Banzuelo covered the song in 2022 to commemorate Eraserheads's Huling El Bimbo reunion concert.
- Morissette and Filipino-American music producer Troy Laureta covered the song for Laureta's 2023 album Dalamhati: A Troy Laureta OPM Collective, Vol. 3.
- Pinkmen covered the song for Cutterpillow: Tribute Album in 2025.

== In other media ==
- Buendia sang the song as a guest artist for FilharmoniKA album as conducted by Gerard Salonga, Kumpas: An Orchestral Celebration of Pinoy Music.
- When local radio station NU 107 signed off for the last time on 8 November 2010, "Ang Huling El Bimbo" played as its final song.
