= Bananatype =

EP by Eraserheads
- Released: June 15, 1997
- Recorded: 1997; 1995 (“Police Woman”)
- Studios: Tracks, Pasig; JR, Makati (“Police Woman”); EJL, Quezon City (“Tikman”)
- Genres: Pinoy rock; alternative rock
- Length: 20:36
- Labels: Greater East Asia Music; BMG Records (Pilipinas) Inc.
- Producers: Robin Rivera; Eraserheads

Eraserheads chronology
| Fruitcake (1996) | Bananatype (1997) | Sticker Happy (1997) |

Bananatype is the second extended play by the Philippine alternative rock band Eraserheads, released on June 15, 1997, through BMG Records (Pilipinas) Inc. It serves as promotional material for the band's fifth album Sticker Happy, which was released three months later.

== Composition ==
The promotional EP contains three new songs not included in Sticker Happy. Its lead single “Harana” is a psychedelic, “modernist take” on the titular Philippine serenade. The title track, written by Ely Buendia and his friend Romel “Sancho” Sanchez, has hip-hop and funk elements and segues into “I Can’t Remember You”, which was inspired by a nursery rhyme made up by Buendia's younger sisters Lally and Elyra.

Bananatype also features two previously unreleased songs. “Police Woman” was originally written by drummer Raymund Marasigan for the 1995 film Run Barbi Run, along with the title track (which was used in the final film) and the still unreleased “Bootleg”. “Tikman” was written in 1994 as a commercial jingle for Burger Machine, with its lyrics containing food-related sexual innuendo.

== Track listing ==
Bananatype (Note: In the cassette edition, side one, "Type A", runs from Harana to Police Woman, while side two, "Type B", runs from Bananatype to Tikman.)
| No. | Title | Writer(s) | Length |
|---|---|---|---|
| 1. | "Harana" | Ely Buendia | 6:05 |
| 2. | "Police Woman" | Buendia; Raymund Marasigan; Marcus Adoro; Buddy Zabala | 5:06 |
| 3. | "Bananatype" | Buendia; Romel Sanchez | 3:30 |
| 4. | "I Can't Remember You" | Buendia | 3:04 |
| 5. | "Tikman" | Buendia; Marasigan | 2:54 |
| Total length: | | | 20:36 |

== Personnel ==
Adapted from the liner notes.

Eraserheads

- Ely Buendia - vocals, guitars
- Buddy Zabala - bass, vocals (2, 5), keyboards (2)
- Marcus Adoro - guitars, vocals (2–4)
- Raymund Marasigan - drums, vocals (2), drum machine (5)

Additional musician

- Noel Garcia - keyboards (tracks 1, 3–4)

Production

- Eraserheads - arrangement, production (5)
- Robin Rivera - production (except 5)
- Angee Rozul - mixing, engineering (1, 3–4)
- Lito Palco - mixing, engineering (2)
- Mark Laccay - mixing, engineering (5)
- Rudy Tee - executive production
- Vic Valenciano - A&R
- Romel "Sancho" Sanchez - additional subtraction

Design

- Day Cabuhat - design, layout (Fractal Cow Studio)
- Dino Ignacio - design, layout (Fractal Cow Studio)
