= Fruitcake (Eraserheads EP) =

Extended play

EP by Eraserheads
- Released: November 1996
- Recorded: December 1994 (3); 1996 (1-2)
- Studio: Tracks (Pasig)
- Genres: Alternative rock; indie rock; Christmas
- Length: 11:51
- Labels: Greater East Asia Music; BMG Records (Pilipinas) Inc.

Eraserheads chronology
Cutterpillow (1995)	Fruitcake (1996)	Fruitcake (album) (1996)

Fruitcake is the first extended play by the Philippine alternative rock band Eraserheads, released in November 1996 through BMG Records (Pilipinas) Inc. It serves as promotional material for the band’s fourth album of the same name, which was released the following month.

== Composition ==
The promotional EP contains two tracks from the upcoming Fruitcake album: an edited version of the title track and "Old Fashioned Christmas Carol". The third track is an acoustic cover of the Christmas standard "Christmas Alphabet", recorded live at NU 107 in December 1994.

== Music video of the Title Track ==
The music video for "Fruitcake" was directed by the band with help from American director Mark Gary. Shot at Cubao in Quezon City, it shows the band posing as blind musicians and handing out leaflets in barbershops, markets and a carousel before being arrested by a policeman. The video features cameo appearances from Francis M. playing the policeman and singer/actress Agot Isidro.

== Track listing ==
All tracks are written by Ely Buendia, except where noted.

Fruitcake (Note: In the cassette edition, both sides run the same tracks.)
No.	Title	Writer(s)	Length
1.	"Fruitcake" (single edition (Note: This version ends with the lines "A little lovin and some fruit to bake/Life is a piece of cake," as well as ending on a guitar chord. On the other hand, the album version starts with the album's final track, "Merry Christmas Everybody Happy New Year Too", in reverse, and ends with the lines "A little girl is riding all alone/She ran away from home," as it segues to the next album track, "Shadow".))		4:35
2.	"Old Fashioned Christmas Carol"		4:38
3.	"Christmas Alphabet"	Buddy Kaye; Jules Loman; Eraserheads	2:38
Total length:			11:51

Notelist

== Personnel ==
Adapted from the liner notes.

Eraserheads

- Ely Buendia - guitars, vocals, inlay design
- Buddy Zabala - bass, keyboards, percussion, back-up vocals, attempted printing
- Marcus Adoro - guitars
- Raimund Marasigan - drums, percussion, keyboards, back-up vocals, inlay design

Additional musicians

- Bobbit, Robert, Jeng Tan, Dong, Mark Laccay - "X-tra filling" (3)

Production

- Robin Rivera - production, little drummer boy, percussion, back-up vocals (2)
- Angee Rozul - mixing, engineering

Design

- Jeng Tan - inlay design
- Francis M. - additional printing
- Earnest Mangulabnan - attempted printing
