= Carbon Stereoxide =

Studio album by Eraserheads
- Released: March 10, 2001
- Recorded: October – December 2000
- Studios: Tracks, Pasig; Suite 16, Quezon City; The Squid Crib, Marikina; Bombshelter Records
- Genres: Pinoy rock; hard rock; folk rock; electronica; industrial
- Length: 56:02
- Labels: Musiko Records; BMG Records (Pilipinas) Inc.
- Producers: Robin Rivera; Eraserheads

Eraserheads chronology
Natin99 (1999)	Carbon Stereoxide (2001)	Eraserheads: The Singles (2001)

Singles from Carbon Stereoxide
- 1. "Maskara" Released: March 2001; 2. "Hula" Released: 2001; 3. "How Far Will U Go" Released: August 13, 2001

Carbon Stereoxide is the seventh and final studio album by the Philippine alternative rock band Eraserheads, first released on March 10, 2001 by BMG Records (Pilipinas) Inc.

The album featured a dark and mature sound, with folk and drum and bass elements. It received poor reviews.

== Background ==
The band’s sixth studio album Natin99 was released in May 1999. In August, drummer Raimund Marasigan’s band Sandwich released their debut studio album Grip Stand Throw. Marasigan also worked on his solo album Inkjet under the electronic project Squid 9, which was eventually released after Carbon Stereoxide. Meanwhile, lead vocalist Ely Buendia released his first solo album Wanted Bedspacer in December 2000. Bassist Buddy Zabala produced albums for other bands such as Itchyworms and Asin, while guitarist Marcus Adoro worked as session musician for Pepe Smith.

In a Philippine Daily Inquirer interview in 2001, Buendia admitted that he felt burnt out making Natin99. “Hindi ko na alam ang direksyon (I didn't know our direction anymore),” he said. “Na cut-off ako sa roots namin, at na-realize ko na mas gusto ko ang stripped-down sound namin (I was cut off from our roots and I realized that I liked our stripped-down sound more).” In another interview promoting his solo album Wanted Bedspacer in 2000, he hoped that Carbon Stereoxide will bring the band back to basics.

== Recording ==
The album was recorded between October and December 2000 at Tracks Studios in Pasig. Production was handled by Robin Rivera, who had previously produced five of the band’s albums. The band's record label BMG had reportedly imposed a strict deadline for them to finish recording the album by December.

The album’s working titles include Eight Down, Two to Go (referring to the band’s recording contract with BMG) and Escalators Up Ahead. Zabala’s partner Earnest Mangulabnan finally announced the album’s final title as Carbon Stereoxide, a pun on carbon monoxide & carbon dioxide.

== Music and lyrics ==
In a chat event with Philmusic in 2000, Marasigan hinted at Carbon Stereoxide’s sound as being inspired by The Cure, with folk and drum and bass elements. The band had attended a Cure concert in California last June. The album was also described as “dark, mature — not so much pop as rock” and a “near-complete departure from the original Eraserheads sound”.

The band had performed some of the new material live, including “Maskara” and “Palamig”. An early composition, “Get This Love Thing Down”, was also performed live but was not included in the album. The band later teased the song at the end of their 2025 documentary Eraserheads: Combo on the Run. Buendia gave a statement: "I’m excited for our new and longtime fans to hear what we came up with. We’ve each grown to different phases and explored different sounds, but this song reflects where we are now — emotionally, musically, and spiritually.”

Adoro contributed two tracks, "Wala" and "Pula", which had folk elements. "Out of Sight" was inspired by Blur.

== Release ==
Carbon Stereoxide was initially set to release on January 15, but was later postponed to March.

The album was promoted by the lead single “Maskara”, with a music video directed by Buendia and Marie Jamora.

Carbon Stereoxide was first released on cassette. Its subsequent CD release included a bonus VCD with the music video for "Maskara" as well as behind the scenes footage and interviews, and also included a set of masks featuring the band members.

In 2008, BMG reissued Eraserheads's back catalogue, including Carbon Stereoxide.

== Reception ==
Professional ratings
Review scores
Source	Rating
Allmusic	2/5 stars

Carbon Stereoxide sold 12,000 copies in the Philippines, making it the least successful album by the band in terms of sales.

The album was poorly received by critics upon release. Baby Gil of The Philippine Star wrote: "Carbon Stereoxide finds the Eraserheads at the crossroads." She added that the album's guitar and drums "get too loud in the wrong places at times, but take note, they are real."

David Gonzales of Allmusic regarded Carbon Stereoxide as "another bewildering mess". While he considered the album's first two opening tracks ("Ultrasound" and "Maskara") as "good alternative rock songs", he pointed out that these songs will fail to appeal to a wide range of listeners. Gonzales dismissed most of the album as "pointless and meandering".

== Track listing ==
CD and cassette (Note: In the cassette edition, side one runs from Ultrasound to Palamig, while side two runs from Out of Sight to Acid Eyes.)
No.	Title	Writer(s)	Length
1.	"Ultrasound"	Ely Buendia	4:21
2.	"Maskara"	Buendia	4:11
3.	"How Far Will U Go"	Buddy Zabala; Raymund Marasigan	3:05
4.	"Bloodtest" (filler)	Marasigan	0:43
5.	"Wala"	Marcus Adoro	7:14
6.	"Hula"	Buendia	3:06
7.	"Photo Synth" (filler)	Marasigan	0:32
8.	"Palamig"	Buendia	4:22
9.	"Out of Sight"	Zabala; Marasigan	3:09
10.	"Super Vision" (filler)	Marasigan	0:18
11.	"Paint Stripper"	Marasigan	3:28
12.	"Escalator Alligator" (filler)	Adoro	1:14
13.	"Playground"	Marasigan	4:12
14.	"Omnesia"	Buendia	4:14
15.	"OK Comprende" (filler)	Marasigan	0:27
16.	"Pula"	Adoro	5:26
17.	"Outside"	Buendia; Zabala; Earnest Mangulabnan	5:32
18.	"Acid Eyes" (filler)	Marasigan	0:19
Total length:			55:53

Bonus VCD
No.	Title	Length
1.	"Maskara (Music Video)" (also contains behind the scenes footage)	34:42

== Personnel ==
Adapted from the liner notes.

Eraserheads

- Ely Buendia – vocals (except 4, 7, 10, 15, 18), guitars (except 4, 7, 10, 15, 18), backing vocals (3, 5, 14), cover and Sagada photos
- Buddy Zabala – bass (except 4, 7, 10, 15, 18), guitars (3, 6), backing vocals (3, 5, 14)
- Marcus Adoro – guitars (except 4, 7, 10, 15, 18), vocals (tracks 5, 16)
- Raimund Marasigan – drums (except 4, 7, 10, 15, 18), guitars (except 4, 7, 10, 15, 18), percussion (13, 16–17), backing vocals (3, 9), filter (13, 17), vocals (11), additional beats (12), loops (13)

Additional musicians

- Mica Solmoro – ice cream (5)
- Zach Lucero – percussion (13, 16)

Production

- Eraserheads – production
- Robin Rivera – production, backing vocals (3, 5, 14), percussion (13, 16)
- Angee Rozul – mixing, recording
- Rudy Tee – executive production
- Vic Valenciano – A&R

Design

- Diane Ventura (credited as Diane D. Cute) – band photographer
- Cynthia Bauzon – sleeve, art direction
