= Natin99 =

Studio album by Eraserheads
- Released: May 18, 1999
- Recorded: September 1998 – early 1999
- Studios: Tracks, Pasig; EJL, Quezon City
- Genres: Alternative rock; progressive rock; art rock; art pop
- Length: 64:11
- Labels: Greater East Asia Music; BMG Records (Pilipinas) Inc.
- Producers: Robin Rivera; Eraserheads

Eraserheads chronology
Aloha Milkyway (1998)	Natin99 (1999)	Carbon Stereoxide (2001)

Eraserheads studio album chronology
Sticker Happy (1997)	Natin99 (1999)	Carbon Stereoxide (2001)

Singles from Natin99
- 1. "Maselang Bahaghari" Released: April 1999; 2. "Huwag Kang Matakot" Released: 1999

Natin99 is the sixth studio album by the Philippine alternative rock band Eraserheads, released on May 18, 1999, by BMG Records (Pilipinas) Inc.

The album was recorded in a nonlinear approach, with the members recording their individual parts separately and mixing them together in the studio. It also had significant writing contributions from members other than chief songwriter Ely Buendia, who wrote the promotional singles “Maselang Bahaghari” and “Huwag Kang Matakot”.

== Background ==
The band previously released their fifth studio album Sticker Happy (1997). They toured the country as well as the United States to promote the album. In 1998, they released the compilation album Aloha Milkyway for the Southeast Asian market. They toured in Singapore in September 1998 and Australia in April 1999 to promote the record.

Buendia reflected on the time period: "I was on the brink of a nervous breakdown. I was wracked by anxiety and insecurity. I was coping with a big inferiority complex. I realized too late that I really didn't like my role as chief songwriter of the group; muntik ko nang hindi nakayanan ang pressures (I was almost unable to withstand the pressure)." He continued that recording Natin99 served as therapy for him, as he was able to rely on his bandmates. "That's why I'm glad that in the new album, they have more active participation especially in songwriting," he said. However, Buendia admitted in a Philippine Daily Inquirer interview in 2001 that he felt burnt out making Natin99. “Hindi ko na alam ang direksyon (I didn't know our direction anymore),” he said. “Na cut-off ako sa roots namin, at na-realize ko na mas gusto ko ang stripped-down sound namin (I was cut off from our roots and I realized that I liked our stripped-down sound more).”

== Recording ==
The band worked on Natin99 from September 1998 to early 1999 with their longtime producer Robin Rivera.

The album was recorded in a nonlinear approach, with the band recording their parts at home and mixing them together with additional instrumentation in the studio. "It's like cut-and-paste. You could 'manipulate' certain elements to put it all together,” drummer Raimund Marasigan said. This was showcased in "Peace It Together", the first song written for the album.

== Music and lyrics ==
All songs in Natin99 were recorded in Tagalog except for a few lines in “Peace It Together” and “Game, Tama Na!”, a conscious effort by the band after their previous albums Fruitcake (1996) and Sticker Happy (1997) featured many English songs. “It was a personal challenge to write an all-Filipino album,” Marasigan said.

The album starts with the drum and bass instrumental “Sinturong Pangkaligtasan” which segues into “Dahan Dahan”, a power pop song with distorted, melodic guitar solos. Both tracks were written by Marasigan, who also performed in “May Sumasayaw” and “Kilala” which have hardcore elements. Bassist Buddy Zabala wrote “Kahit Ano”, which features nonsensical Japanese lyrics. Buendia does not appear in the album until the fifth track “Maselang Bahaghari”, described as Beatles meets electronica. Zabala co-wrote “Tama Ka” with his partner Earnest Mangulabnan.

The seven-minute “Peace It Together” serves as the album's centerpiece for its nonlinear recording approach. Zabala wrote “Salamin”, a “radio-friendly” new wave dance song. Buendia wrote “Pop Machine” as a commentary on game shows and celebrity gossip. “Huwag Kang Matakot”, released as the album's second single, is a “’60s-style simple and sincere” song. Guitarist Marcus Adoro wrote “South Superhighway”, which features “aggressive techno, jungle and effect-laden guitars”. “68 Dr. Sixto Antonio Avenue” derives its melody from John Lennon’s song “Mother” and refers to Buendia’s childhood home. The final track “Game, Tama Na!” features comedic wordplay.

The album also features a hidden filler track from Adoro titled “United Natins (Immigration Interrogation Doughpdog Mix)”, featuring sound effects of water drips and droning narration from different speakers. Adoro had interviewed some foreigners in Baguio and recorded them talking in their native language, instructing them to add the word “natin”.

The band also recorded the song “Aliw” which was not included in the album.

== Title and artwork ==
The title is a pun on the year 1999 and the Tagalog word “natin” (ours), which was coined by Adoro and a private joke among the band. The cover art of Natin99 was designed by Cynthia Bauzon and shows four digital waveforms representing the band members.

== Promotion and release ==
Professional ratings
Review scores
Source	Rating
Allmusic	2.5/5 stars

A nine-minute sampler was released to select FM radio stations in the Philippines with teasers of nine songs from the album. "It’s a BMG thing," Marasigan explained. "1999…nine minutes, nine everything, nine hours, nine o’clock…So lots of people can get a sample of what the album sounds like."

The band launched Natin99 on TV through the ABS-CBN variety show ASAP in May. A week later, they performed the entire album at the Family Fun Kingdom amusement park in Pasig. They embarked on a US tour in March 2000.

In 2008, BMG reissued Eraserheads's back catalogue, including Natin99.

== Track listing ==
Natin99 (Note: In the cassette edition, side one runs from Sinturong Pangkaligtasan to Salamin, while side two runs from Pop Machine to United Natins (Immigration Interrogation Doughpdog Mix).)
No.	Title	Writer(s)	Length
1.	"Sinturong Pangkaligtasan"	Raimund Marasigan	2:29
2.	"Dahan Dahan"	Marasigan	2:38
3.	"Kahit Ano"	Buddy Zabala	3:06
4.	"Sino Sa Atin"	Marasigan	3:03
5.	"Maselang Bahaghari"	Ely Buendia	3:28
6.	"Tama Ka"	Zabala; Earnest Mangulabnan	3:20
7.	"May Sumasayaw"	Marasigan	3:26
8.	"Peace It Together"	Buendia; Marcus Adoro; Zabala; Marasigan	7:14
9.	"Salamin"	Zabala	3:31
10.	"Pop Machine"	Buendia	5:39
11.	"Kilala"	Marasigan	4:02
12.	"Huwag Kang Matakot"	Buendia	3:10
13.	"South Superhighway"	Adoro	4:10
14.	"68 Dr. Sixto Antonio Ave."	Buendia	5:34
15.	"Game, Tama Na!"	Buendia	5:20 (Note: When combined with "United Natins (Immigration Interrogation Doughpdog Mix)", the length is 9:20.)
16.	"United Natins (Immigration Interrogation Doughpdog Mix)" (hidden track)	Adoro	4:00
Total length:			64:11

== Personnel ==
Adapted from the liner notes.

Eraserheads

- Ely Buendia – lead vocals (5, 8, 10, 12, 14-15), guitars (except 1, 7), drums (5, 8, 10 (crashes only), 12), synths (5, 8, 10, 12, 14-15), percussion (5, 8, 12, 15), keyboards (8), backing vocals (1, 3, 6, 8-9, 12, 15), "coffee refills" (13)
- Buddy Zabala – lead vocals (3, 6, 8, 9), bass (except 1), guitars (3, 5-6, 8-9), keyboards (3, 6, 8, 14), synths (4-5, 8, 10, 12, 14), drums (8), backing vocals (8, 12), "RPsixtweak" (13)
- Marcus Adoro – guitars (except 1, 14), vocals (1, 8, 13), synths (8, 14), drums (8), theremin (8), samples (13), sound effects (13), console mastering (13), final mixing (13), percussion (15)
- Raimund Marasigan – lead vocals (1-2, 4, 7, 8, 11), drums (except 1), programming (1), loops (2-4, 6-12, 14), guitars (2-4, 7, 11, 15), synths (4, 8-11, 13-15), lo-fi box (6)

Additional Musicians

- "She" - backing vocals (15)
- "Karin" - backing vocals (15)
- "Gary" - backing vocals (15)
- "Jeng" - backing vocals (15)
- "Yordi" - backing vocals (15)

Production

- Eraserheads – production
- Robin Rivera – production, pads (1), synths (2, 4-5), backing vocals (3, 5-6, "Hello, hello" lyric of 9, 15), percussion (5, 8), drums (7-8), camera (8), keyboards (14), percussion (15), photography
- Angee Rozul – mixing, recording, "sadie" (8), backing vocals (15)
- Eric Lava – additional recording, editing
- Rudy Tee – executive production
- Vic Valenciano – A&R
- Romel "Sancho" Sanchez – A&R, guitar (2, 8), backing vocals (8, "Hello, hello" lyric of 9)

Design

- Cynthia Bauzon – sleeve design

== Certifications ==
Country	Provider	Certification	Sales
Philippines	PARI	Gold	20,000
