= Run Barbi Run =

- Directed by: Tony Y. Reyes
- Screenplay by: Rosauro dela Cruz; Tony Y. Reyes
- Story by: Tony Gloria
- Produced by: Tony Gloria
- Starring: Joey de Leon; Maricel Laxa; Eraserheads
- Cinematography: Sergio Lobo
- Edited by: Eduardo Jarlego
- Music by: Jaime Fabregas
- Production companies: Moviestars Production; Cinemax Studios
- Distributed by: Cinemax Studios
- Release date: July 19, 1995
- Country: Philippines
- Language: Filipino
- Budget: ₱15 million

Run Barbi Run is a 1995 Philippine comedy film directed by Tony Y. Reyes. Joey de Leon reprises his role as the titular character and is joined by Maricel Laxa and Eraserheads. It is third installment of the Barbi trilogy, which started with Barbi: Maid in the Philippines in 1989 and the political satire comedy Barbi for President (First Lady na Rin) in 1991.

== Plot ==
Bartolome del Rosario is a Shakey's pizza delivery boy who witnesses the massacre of the Black Scorpion Gang committed by a group of henchmen during a nighttime delivery. As a result, he is indefinitely suspended from his job and has to decide whether to turn state witness or hide forever. Ultimately, he decides to turn himself over to the authorities after his grandmother and mother appear in his dream. However, he is put on the death list of the henchmen's boss Gardo who is not pleased with his revelations. A conflict with the authorities over a supposed filmization of the massacre witnessed by Bartolome almost costs him his life after Gardo finds his whereabouts, forcing him to go into hiding. He finds himself in a bar that features gay impersonators and rock bands. Seeing an opportunity to escape from his pursuers, he disguises himself as Barbi, a gay impersonator of Barbra Streisand.

As Barbi, he is able to enjoy the life as an impersonator/DJ in the bar and becomes friends with the bar's in-house band, the Eraserheads, going as far as to save the band from music pirates copying the band's songs. But when he crossed paths with a policewoman named Victoria "Toyang" Fernandez, he reveals his true identity as the star witness of the massacre. As a result, he joins forces with Toyang and the Eraserheads to finally pin down Gardo.

== Cast ==
- Joey de Leon as Bartolome "Barbi" del Rosario
- Maricel Laxa as Victoria "Toyang" Fernandez
- Eraserheads as themselves
- Noel Trinidad as Maj. Velarde
- Subas Herrero as Atty. Ramon Lazaro
- Roldan Aquino as Gardo
- Nanette Inventor as Flor
- Inday Garutay as himself
- Allan K. as himself/a female impersonator
- Richard Merck as Junior
- Lou Veloso as Mr. Gloria
- Rolando Tinio as Mr. Tengko
- Gary Lising as Alex
- Archie Adamos as Direk Carlito Carlos
- Mila Castillo as Carlito's Wife
- Giovanni Calvo as himself
- Maning Bato as Efren
- Vangie Labalan as Flora
- Mely Tagasa as Decia
- Winnie Cordero as Cordero
- Rene Hawkins as Magsanoc
- Ernie Forte as Abarrientos
- Robert Talby as Frankie
- Danny Labra as Versosa
- Nonong de Andres as Chris
- Boy Salvador as Danny
- Sonny Valencia as Noli
- Alex Cunanan as Jimmy
- Roger Moring as Maxie

== Original soundtrack ==
1. "Run Barbi Run" by Eraserheads
2. "With A Smile" by Eraserheads
3. "Magasin" by Eraserheads
4. "Dreamlover" by Mariah Carey
5. "I'll Never Love This Way Again" by Dionne Warwick
6. "This Is My Live (La Vida)" by Shirley Bassey

== Production notes ==
Some of the actors that co-starred with Joey de Leon in the second Barbi film appear in Run Barbi Run in different roles. Noel Trinidad (who previously played the "presidentiable" Miguel San Pedro), Mely Tagasa (as the incumbent president's wife), Nanette Inventor (Madam "Auring" the fortune teller) and Lou Veloso (as the deranged presidentiable Domeng). In addition, Vangie Labalan, (who portrayed the head chambermaid Cora) in the first Barbi movie, also appeared in the movie as a widow whose husband was badly jinxed, only to get her husband's casket ran over by Barbi's vehicle who in turn hit a drunkard (portrayed by Don Pepot).

== Release ==
Released on July 19, 1995, Run Barbi Run performed poorly at the box office.
