= Fruitcake (album) =

Studio album by Eraserheads
- Released: December 6, 1996
- Recorded: 1996
- Studios: Tracks, Pasig; Cinema Audio, Manila (“Lightyears” string section)
- Genres: Alternative rock; Christmas
- Length: 73:18
- Labels: Greater East Asia Music; BMG Records (Pilipinas) Inc.
- Producer: Robin Rivera

Eraserheads chronology
| Fruitcake (EP) (1996) | Fruitcake (1996) | Bananatype (1997) |

Eraserheads studio album chronology
| Cutterpillow (1995) | Fruitcake (1996) | Sticker Happy (1997) |

Singles from Fruitcake
- 1. "Fruitcake" Released: November 1996; 2. "Trip to Jerusalem" Released: February 1997

Fruitcake is the fourth studio album by the Philippine alternative rock band Eraserheads, released on December 6, 1996, by BMG Records (Pilipinas) Inc.

A Christmas concept album recorded in English, it tells the story of a little girl's journey through Fruitcake Heights. It was accompanied by a storybook released the following year. Like the band's previous albums, Fruitcake became a commercial success but received mixed reviews.

== Concept ==
The album was inspired by the Beatles album Sgt. Pepper's Lonely Hearts Club Band (1967). It tells the story of a young girl named Frannie Wei who runs away from home with her dog Shadow. She finds herself in Fruitcake Heights, a town ruled by a group of people called the XMASCOM. Frannie meets its eclectic residents such as the Gatekeeper, the Baker Boy, the Lord of the Rhum, and the Carol Kings (the band's alter egos).

The XMASCOM had ordered the Carol Kings to play the same Christmas carols every year. However, they had recorded some new material stuffed inside a music box which they are planning to play to the Skid Kids outside Fruitcake Heights. They head out of town before realizing that they left the music box, so they return to Fruitcake Heights, where they find out that its residents had contracted a contagious virus called Monovirus. With Frannie Wei's help, they resolve to find the music box which also has the cure for the virus.

== Songs ==
All songs in Fruitcake were written in English. Local critics found several Beatles references in the album, such as the end of "Fruit Fairy" referencing the 1967 song "A Day in the Life". It also drew comparisons to the Smashing Pumpkins, Oasis, Pixies, the Smiths, and XTC.

The album features bassist Buddy Zabala’s first written compositions for the band, “Fruit Fairy” and “The Fabulous Baker Boy”, as well as three piano interludes: “Shadow Boxes Accountants”, “Shadow Reads the News Today, Oh Boy”, and “shadow@buttholesurfs.com”. “Lord of the Rhum” was performed by guitarist Marcus Adoro, who does an Iggy Pop impression. The song “Lightyears” features a string section conducted by Mel Villena. "Christmas Party" has disco elements, and was later covered by SB19 in 2022 to commemorate the band's Huling El Bimbo reunion concert.

Fruitcake also features contributions from Rivermaya's Rico Blanco, rapper Francis M., his wife Pia Arroyo and her sister Myla (as Evil Stepsisters), singer/actress Agot Isidro, Jeng Tan of Keltscross, Richard Gonzaga of local jazz band Parliament, Robert Javier of The Youth, and Medwin Marfil of True Faith (who was not credited in the album sleeve).

== Release ==
The release of Fruitcake was preceded by a promotional EP of the same name, featuring an edited version of the title track. Its music video was released in December, directed by the band and featuring cameos from Francis M. and Agot Isidro. A music video for "Trip to Jerusalem" was released the following year, also featuring a cameo from Isidro. MTV Asia also released a live performance of the band performing songs from the album in June 1997.

A companion storybook was released in March 1997, illustrated by Cynthia Bauzon and published by Anvil. It was reissued in 2008.

The album won several awards at the 1997 NU Rock Awards, including Best Album Packaging, Best Music Video, and Producer of the Year for Robin Rivera.

In 2008, BMG reissued Eraserheads's back catalogue, including Fruitcake. After the band's reunion concert in 2022, it was re-released on streaming services to include 360-degree spatial sound. It is set to be released on vinyl in 2026 as part of its 30th anniversary.

== Reception ==
Professional ratings
Review scores
| Source | Rating |
|---|---|
| Allmusic | 2.5/5 stars |

Fruitcake reached triple platinum a month after its release, with 120,000 copies sold.

The album received mixed reviews. “The concept is fine, and the music is surprisingly accomplished, but they’re skating dangerously near preciousness,” said Barbara Marchadesch in her review for Manila Standard. In his retrospective review for Allmusic, David Gonzales stated: "While the band deserves some credit for trying to stretch boundaries, Fruitcake is the wrong album at the wrong time."

Critics unfavorably viewed its diverse influences as distracting and “smack[ing] of parody”. They also lamented the lack of Filipino tracks. "Perhaps wanting to be 'at par' with their foreign counterparts, the Eraserheads have ceased to be the mouthpiece of the Filipino youth," one review stated.

“Hindi naman kami concerned sa sales, eh (We're not concerned by the sales),” Zabala commented in 1996. “Basta kuntento kami sa kinalabasan ng album (What matters is that we are content with how the album turned out).” Vocalist Ely Buendia retrospectively commented on the album in a 2012 Esquire article: "I stand by Fruitcake. As a whole, as a concept. But I won’t listen to it in its entirety...A lot of people noticed [the Beatles influences] and that’s one of the things I regret, not being able to see the bigger picture."

== Track listing ==
Fruitcake (Note: In the cassette edition, side one, "North of Nowhere", runs from Fruitcake to The Fabulous Baker Boy, while side two, "South of Somewhere", runs from Lord of the Rhum to Merry Christmas Everybody Happy New Year Too. The names of the cassette sides are also found in the lyrics of Lightyears.)
| No. | Title | Writer(s) | Length |
|---|---|---|---|
| 1. | "Fruitcake" (album version (Note: This version starts with the album's final track, "Merry Christmas Everybody Happy New Year Too", in reverse, and ends with the lines "A little girl is riding all alone/She ran away from home," as it segues to "Shadow". On the other hand, the EP and single versions, which lacks the aforementioned reversed snippet, ends with the lines "A little lovin and some fruit to bake/Life is a piece of cake," as well as ending on a guitar chord.)) | Ely Buendia | 4:59 |
| 2. | "Shadow" | Buendia | 2:38 |
| 3. | "Flat Tire" | Raimund Marasigan; Jeng Tan | 4:09 |
| 4. | "Shadow Boxes Accountants" | Buddy Zabala | 1:02 |
| 5. | "Gatekeeper" | Marasigan | 2:43 |
| 6. | "Old Fashioned Christmas Carol" | Buendia (Note: Despite Buendia getting the sole writer credit, "Old Fashioned Christmas Carol" interpolates lyrics from "Silver Bells", "Jingle Bells", "The Little Drummer Boy", "Joy to the World", "Silent Night", "Whispering Hope", and "Rudolph the Red-Nosed Reindeer".) | 4:39 |
| 7. | "Styrosnow" | Buendia | 2:15 |
| 8. | "Trip to Jerusalem" (album version (Note: This version features an outro jam, with the repeating lines "Spin, spin/Gonna spin you around." This jam is absent from the single version)) | Buendia | 6:15 |
| 9. | "Shadow Reads the News Today, Oh Boy" | Zabala | 0:27 |
| 10. | "Fruit Fairy" | Earnest Mangulabnan; Marasigan; Zabala | 2:49 |
| 11. | "The Fabulous Baker Boy" | Zabala | 5:00 |
| 12. | "Lord of the Rhum" | Marcus Adoro | 4:02 |
| 13. | "Lightyears" | Buendia | 4:18 |
| 14. | "Christmas Ball" | Marasigan; Tan | 3:19 |
| 15. | "Monovirus" | Marasigan | 4:28 |
| 16. | "shadow@buttholesurfs.com" | Zabala | 1:04 |
| 17. | "Rise and Shine" | Buendia | 3:32 |
| 18. | "Santa Ain't Comin' No Mo'" | Buendia | 2:53 |
| 19. | "Christmas Party" | Buendia | 4:04 |
| 20. | "Hitchin' a Ride" (contains a sample of "Fruitcake" near the end) | Marasigan; Tan | 3:38 |
| 21. | "Christmas Morning" | Buendia | 4:07 |
| 22. | "Merry Christmas Everybody Happy New Year Too" (hidden track) | Buendia | 0:57 |
| Total length: | | | 73:18 |

== Personnel ==
Adapted from the liner notes.

Eraserheads

- Ely Buendia - vocals, guitars, bass
- Buddy Zabala - bass, keyboards, vocals (10, 11, 14)
- Marcus Adoro - lead guitar, vocals (12)
- Raimund Marasigan - drums, vocals (3, 5, 15, 20)

Additional musicians

- Rico Blanco - backing vocals (5, 8), guest caroler (22)
- Francis M. - lead vocals (19), guest caroler (22)
- Jeng Tan - lead vocals (14), harmony (11), guest caroler (22)
- Lally Buendia - harmony (7, 19), guest caroler (22)
- Lyra Buendia - harmony (7, 19), guest caroler (22)
- Earnest Mangulabnan - harmony (11, 12), guest caroler (22)
- Pia Arroyo-Magalona - harmony (11), guest caroler (22)
- Myla Arroyo - harmony (11), guest caroler (22)
- Ona Medina - harmony (11), guest caroler (22)
- Pia Reloj - harmony (track 11), guest caroler (22)
- Estelle Custodio - harmony (11), guest caroler (22)
- Shiela Sta. Ana - harmony (11), guest caroler (22)
- Mel Villena - string section conductor (13)
  - Benjie Bautista, Proceso Yusi, Liza Lopez, Bernadette Cadomiga - 1st violins
  - Rosario Molina, Nile Mendoza, Ricky Imperial, Jemay Dadap - 2nd violins
  - Angelito Molina, Cecille Noble - viola
  - Tina Pasamba, Tess Ibero - cellos
- Agot Isidro - guest caroler (22)
- Robert Javier - guest caroler (22)
- Tina Tybong-Banua - guest caroler (22)
- Karina Araneta - guest caroler (22)
- She Asignacion - guest caroler (22)
- Richard Gonzaga - trumpet (10)
- Vicente "Enteng" Villasanta - handclaps (11)
- Jojo Bacasmas - town crier (11)
- Michael Guevarra - saxophone (18)

Production

- Eraserheads - arrangement
- Robin Rivera - production, recording, mixing, engineering, digital mastering, backing vocals (1, 6, 20)
- Angee Rozul - recording, mixing
- Dindo Aldecoa - string section recording (13)
- Rudy Tee - executive production
- Eric Lava - digital mastering
- Vic Valenciano - A&R
- Romel "Sancho" Sanchez - additional A&R, guest caroler (22)
- Fatal Posporos - management

Design

- Cynthia Bauzon - illustration, art direction, sleeve design
