= Cutterpillow =

Studio album by Eraserheads
- Released: December 8, 1995
- Recorded: 1995
- Studios: JR, Makati; Baden-Powell International House, Tsim Sha Tsui (“Cutterpillow”)
- Genres: Pinoy rock; alternative rock; pop-punk
- Length: 64:46
- Labels: Musiko Records; BMG Records (Pilipinas) Inc.
- Producer: Robin Rivera

Eraserheads chronology
Circus (1994)	Cutterpillow (1995)	Fruitcake (EP) (1996)

Eraserheads studio album chronology
Circus (1994)	Cutterpillow (1995)	Fruitcake (1996)

Singles from Cutterpillow
- 1. "Ang Huling El Bimbo" Released: 1995; 2. "Overdrive" Released: 1996

Cutterpillow is the third studio album by the Philippine alternative rock band Eraserheads, released on December 8, 1995, through BMG Records (Pilipinas) Inc.

It became the band's most commercially successful album in the Philippines. To date, Cutterpillow has sold over 400,000 units in the country, becoming the third biggest-selling album in OPM history and the biggest for any Philippine band or group. The album features hit singles such as “Overdrive”, "Torpedo", “Huwag Mo Nang Itanong”, and “Ang Huling El Bimbo”.

== Recording ==
The band returned to the studio to record songs for Cutterpillow, bringing back Robin Rivera as producer after working with him on their previous album Circus. “We’re doing a lot of experimentation this time,” said drummer Raimund Marasigan. “Sonically, it’s gonna be a lot more diverse than the previous albums.” Vocalist Ely Buendia added: “We have more freedom na maglagay ng mga songs na type namin (to add songs that we like)."

== Music and lyrics ==
The album's opening track “Superproxy” is a collaboration with Philippine rapper Francis M., who would later record another version with Buendia titled “Superproxy 2K6” for the first Eraserheads tribute album Ultraelectromagneticjam!: The Music of the Eraserheads in 2005. The band performed the song during their reunion concert in 2022 with the rapper as a hologram, joined by his sons Elmo and Arkin and Buendia's son Eon. "Superproxy" was also covered by Razorback and Gloc-9 for The Reunion: An Eraserheads Tribute Album (2012) and of Mercury, Sofia Ines and Alex Bruce in 2022.

“Back2Me” “moves on a punkish vibe,” writes David Gonzales in his retrospective review for Allmusic, with “a catchy, snappy melody reminiscent of Green Day”. He adds that “Waiting for the Bus” is “enchanting”, highlighted by a “rapturous chorus”.

“Overdrive” features an “ulcer-aggravating food recital” for its outro. It was parodied by Philippine punk band The End in the song “Drayb My BM”, and later covered by Barbie Almalbis for Ultraelectromagneticjam! and Vin Dancel for The Reunion. “Torpedo” depicts the agony of being “torpe” (local slang for a person unable to express romantic feelings toward someone) and quotes the Pink Floyd song “Brain Damage” while having disco elements. It was later covered by Isha for Ultraelectromagneticjam! and Gloc-9 (with JP of Kiko Machine) for his album Diploma (2007).

“Poorman's Grave” is described as “dark, somber, and morbid” set to an “uppity beat”, and was one of the first songs written by the band before the Pop-U! demo tape. Buendia regarded it as a song he is proud of writing: "It was one of the few songs that I wrote that...came out from a real desire to express something that I felt at that time—which was, to put it bluntly, father issues, and not having the freedom of doing what you want at that age." Final track “Ang Huling El Bimbo” was described as a bittersweet “mini-epic” inspired by the Beatles, referencing the actress Paraluman and the tango standard "El Bimbo".

== Packaging ==
The cover art of Cutterpillow features a jellyfish on a blue background, while the back cover features icons made for each track designed by Joey Navera for Cowpunk! Designs.

== Promotion and release ==
On December 8, 1995, the band launched Cutterpillow through a free open-air concert at the UP Sunken Gardens in Quezon City. Before the concert, they held a press conference where numerous reporters walked out due to the band refusing to perform any songs and insisting on playing excerpts from the new album.

The band premiered the music video for "Ang Huling El Bimbo", directed by Auraeus Solito, in February 1996. They later embarked on a two-month nationwide tour to promote the album.

A tribute album, Cutterpillow: Tribute Album, was released by Offshore Music in May 2025 to celebrate its 30th anniversary.

== Reception ==
=== Commercial ===
The album sold more than 20,000 units on the first day of its release, which doubled the next day. After a week, it earned double platinum with sales more than 80,000 copies, the highest in the band's career.

The album was certified quadruple platinum in 1996, having shipped more than 175,000 copies in just under a month after its release, becoming the fastest selling album in 1990s. By 2012 it was accredited eleven times platinum by the Philippine Association of the Record Industry (PARI).

=== Critical ===
Professional ratings
Review scores
Source	Rating
Allmusic	4.5/5 stars

The album received positive reviews from music critics, most of them pointing out its mature, cohesive sound. In his retrospective review, David Gonzales of Allmusic gave the album four and a half out of five stars, noticing the more substantive sound with only a touch of "kiddie pop" compared to Circus, which he regarded as "lightweight and superficial".

== Live performances ==
The band performed the album in full during their reunion concert in 2022 for the first set, saving "Ang Huling El Bimbo" as the closing song. Marasigan had previously hinted at an "easter egg" in the concert setlist in an interview about their concert rehearsals.

== Reissues ==
In 2008, BMG reissued Eraserheads's back catalogue, including Cutterpillow. After the band's reunion concert in 2022, it was re-released on streaming services to include 360-degree spatial sound.

In April 2024, Offshore Music released the album on vinyl, remastered by Bernie Grundman from the original master tapes.

== Track listing ==
Cutterpillow (Note: In the cassette edition, side one runs from Superproxy to Torpedo, while side two runs from Huwag Mo Nang Itanong to Cutterpillow.)
No.	Title	Writer(s)	Length
1.	"Superproxy" (featuring Francis M.)	Ely Buendia	5:44
2.	"Back2Me"	Buendia; Marcus Adoro; Raymund Marasigan	2:13
3.	"Waiting for the Bus"	Buendia	3:26
4.	"Fine Time"	Marasigan	3:00
5.	"Kamasupra"	Buendia	4:35
6.	"Overdrive"	Buendia; Marasigan	5:04
7.	"Slo Mo"	Buendia; Adoro; Buddy Zabala; Marasigan	3:24
8.	"Torpedo"	Buendia	4:14
9.	"Huwag Mo Nang Itanong"	Buendia	4:09
10.	"Paru-Parong Ningning"	Buendia; Adoro; Marasigan	2:47
11.	"Walang Nagbago"	Buendia	3:22
12.	"Poorman's Grave"	Buendia	4:35
13.	"Yoko"	Marasigan	3:09
14.	"Fill Her"	Buendia; Marasigan	1:47
15.	"Ang Huling El Bimbo"	Buendia	7:27
16.	"Cutterpillow" (hidden track)	Buendia	2:26
17.	"Overdrive (Reprise)" (hidden track (Note: This found only in the CD edition. Additionally, the track's title was only added later on in the 2010 boxset called The Head Set.))	Buendia; Marasigan	2:03

== Personnel ==
Adapted from the liner notes and the recording footage of the title track.

Eraserheads

- Ely Buendia - lead vocals (except 7, 10, 13, 17), backing vocals (except 14, 17), rhythm guitar, lead guitar (1, 5, 15), acoustic guitar (3-6, 8, 10, 12, 14-17), handclaps (8), keyboards (15), design layout, photography
- Buddy Zabala - bass (except 14, 16), organ (3, 12), guitar (7), keyboards (13 (bass), 15), piano (15), harmonica (16), backing vocals (4, 6, 8, 15), lead vocals (choruses of 7, 10)
- Marcus Adoro - lead guitar (except 4, 14; the part in 11 was played backwards), samples (7), slide guitar (10), kebab (12), "declamation" vocals (6)
- Raymund Marasigan - drums (except 14, 16; the part in 9 was played with brushes), acoustic guitar (4), samples (5-6, 11), keyboards (7), guitar (10), bass (16), lead vocals (7, 10, 13), design layout, photography

Additional Musicians

- Francis M. - vocals (1)
- "Annabel" - backing vocals (6)
- Jonathan Brocal "The Jongz" Bacasmas - backing vocals (15)
- Jeng Tan - "oration" vocals (17)
- "Raf" - "oration" vocals (17)
- Julie Pacanas - "oration" vocals (17)

Production

- Eraserheads - recording, mixing, engineering
- Robin Rivera - production, recording, mixing, engineering, keyboards (15), backing vocals (6, 8, 15)
- Romel "Sancho" Sanchez - additional production, backing vocals (6)
- Lito Palco - recording, mixing, engineering
- Mark Laccay - recording (16), engineering (16)
- Ed Formoso - production (1, 5)
- Rudy Tee - executive production
- Eric Lava - digital mastering
- Vic Valenciano - A&R
- Jojo Taylo - concert direction
- Tricia Lazatin - time computation
- Annie Angala - management, photography, acoustic guitar (16), claps (16)
- Bernie Grundman - vinyl mastering (2024 remaster)

Design

- John Joel Lopez - art direction, sleeve design
- Joey "Cowpunk" Navera - design layout, "oration" vocals (17)
- "Mecca" - photography

== Certifications ==
Country	Provider	Certification	Sales
Philippines	PARI	11× Platinum (Diamond)	400,000+

== See also ==
- List of best-selling albums in the Philippines
