= Raymund Marasigan =

Filipino musician

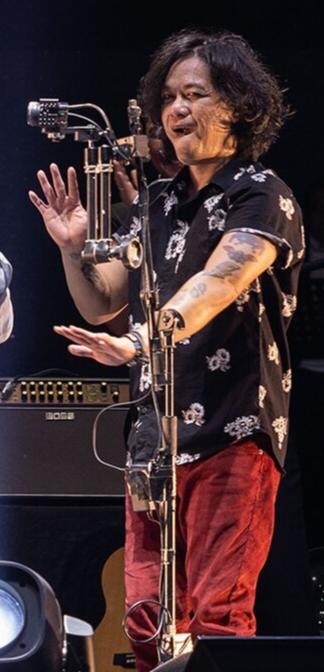
- Marasigan in 2022
- Born: Raimund Emmanuel Parcon Marasigan; May 22, 1971 (age 54); Candelaria, Quezon, Philippines
- Other names: Rayms; Sugar Rayms; Sugarraims; Rayray; Lemon
- Occupations: Musician; record producer
- Years active: 1989–present
- Musical career
- Genres: Alternative rock; pop; rap rock; dance-punk; electronica; experimental; hip hop; Pinoy rock; synth-pop
- Instruments: Drums; guitar; synthesizers; keyboards; bass; keytar; sampler; melodica
- Member of: Eraserheads; Sandwich; Pedicab; Squid 9; Party Pace
- Formerly of: Cambio; Gaijin; Basement Lung; Assembly Generals

Raimund Emmanuel Parcon Marasigan (born May 22, 1971) is a Filipino musician and record producer. He is best known as the drummer of the alternative rock band Eraserheads. Marasigan has been described as "the busiest man in the Pinoy music scene".

Raised in Candelaria, Quezon, Marasigan attended University of the Philippines Diliman in Quezon City, where he met Ely Buendia, who had posted an audition notice for a new band. Inviting his fellow freshmen Buddy Zabala and Marcus Adoro, they would later form Eraserheads. Their debut album Ultraelectromagneticpop! (1993) ushered in a second wave of Philippine rock bands in the 1990s, and the next albums Circus (1994) and Cutterpillow (1995) brought critical and commercial success to the band. After releasing the Christmas concept album Fruitcake (1996), Marasigan took on a more active role in Eraserheads as they experimented with electronic and art rock styles for their next albums Sticker Happy (1997), Natin99 (1999), and Carbon Stereoxide (2001). After Buendia left in 2002, Marasigan and his fellow band members briefly continued with new vocalist Kris Gorra-Dancel before disbanding and forming the band Cambio.

Marasigan formed the indie rock band Sandwich in 1998, which provided a grittier, more experimental sound compared to Eraserheads. He also formed the dance-punk group Pedicab in 2004. Marasigan recently formed the supergroup Party Pace in 2022, drawing influences from surf rock, dream pop, and post-rock. He has also released electronic and hip-hop music under Squid 9.

== Early life ==
Marasigan was born and raised in Candelaria, Quezon. He started playing keyboards at the age of 8 and became an organist at his local church choir. He also learned how to play drums, guitar, and bass. Marasigan initially wanted to play bass for Eraserheads, but switched with Buddy Zabala.

Marasigan attended University of the Philippines Diliman in Quezon City, while also moving to Marikina. He first met Ely Buendia when he responded to his audition notice for a new band with Raymund dela Peña, playing "Hot Hot Hot!!!" by The Cure. He invited Zabala and fellow freshman Marcus Adoro for a jam session at Alberto's rehearsal studio in Cubao, but nothing materialized.

Marasigan, Zabala, and Adoro later formed the college band Curfew with vocalist Candy Pelayo. They performed covers of British new wave acts such as The Primitives, The Bolshoi, Gene Loves Jezebel, The Soup Dragons, and The Housemartins. Marasigan occasionally played drums for Buendia and Dela Peña's new college band Sunday School. He often clashed with dela Peña, with the latter being critical of the former's "uneducated" style of playing. Dela Peña eventually left Sunday School to pursue jazz, leading Marasigan to bring in Zabala and Adoro. Marasigan and Buendia combined Sunday School and Curfew into a new band, which they named Eraserheads after the David Lynch film.

Marasigan had a child named "Atari", with Imago bassist Myrene Academia. They were in a relationship, until 2008 when they decided to separate. Marasigan is now dating Erica Dela Cruz.

== Career ==
=== Eraserheads ===
Marasigan first achieved fame as drummer for the rock band Eraserheads, one of the most popular Philippine bands of the 1990s. He played the drums, provided backing vocals, and occasionally sang on lead vocals. Marasigan's songwriting output for the Eraserheads was only next to that of its principal songwriter Ely Buendia.

In 2002, vocalist-guitarist Ely Buendia left the Eraserheads, and Kris Dancel from the all-female band Fatal Posporos was recruited to fill the vacancy. The group billed themselves as Eheads and issued an EP entitled Please Transpose (2003). The group later renamed themselves Cambio after their lead guitarist Marcus Adoro quit. Cambio released two albums: Derby Light (2003) and Matic (2007).

On August 30, 2008, at the Fort Bonifacio Open Grounds in Taguig, Marasigan joined Buendia, Adoro, and Zabala for The Eraserheads reunion concert. The continuation of the reunion "The Final Set" was held on March 7, 2009, at the SM Mall of Asia concert grounds.

=== Sandwich ===
The band Sandwich was formed in 1995 with Myrene Academia (Imago) & (Duster) on bass, Marc Abaya on lead guitars and vocals later replaced by Mong Alcaraz of Chicosci on guitars when the former quit to focus on being an MTV mainstay, Diego Castillo on rhythm guitars, and Mike Dizon (of bands Pedicab and Teeth) on drums. Although existing simultaneously with the Eraserheads, Sandwich provided a heavier, grittier sound, and built up their own fan base. Marc Abaya left the band in 2005 to concentrate on his career as a VJ while frontlining for his other band Kjwan and Marasigan took over as the lead vocalist. They have released three albums: Grip Stand Throw and 4-Track Mind (later reissued as a 2-in-1 by Sony BMG, and 2004's award-winning Thanks to the Moon's Gravitational Pull (initially an indie release; then later reissued by EMI Philippines with bonus tracks. Sandwich released further albums, entitled Five on the Floor (2006) which featured the phenomenal hit single, Sugod, and <S> Marks the Spot (2008), with its hit single Procrastinator and Betamax.

=== Pedicab ===
In early 2005, Marasigan once again formed Pedicab, another project band. Composed of seasoned artists donning alter egos; Raymund (a.k.a. Sugarraims) is on synths and backup vocals; Mike Dizon (of Sandwich and Teeth) a.k.a. Masterbeat is on drums; Jason Caballa (of Twisted Halo and Blast Ople) a.k.a. J. Sonic is on guitar and backup vocals; Diego Mapa (of Monsterbot and Cambio) a.k.a. Daddy Maps is lead vocals; and acclaimed music video director RA Rivera a.k.a. Just Toni is on visuals and multimedia. They call their music "dunk music" which is essentially their own version of Dance-punk. They released a two-track sampler called "For Hire" with tracks "Bago Pa Mag Pasko" and "Pa-Experience". Pedicab's first album Tugish Takish (the name coming from onomatopoeia of the sounds made by banging on drums) under Vicor music was released later that year. Tugish Takish has spawned hits such as "Dito Tayo Sa Dilim", "Dizzy Boy", "Konti Na Lang" and "A Stormy Night". Their second album "Shinji Ilabas Mo Na Ang Helicopter" with carrier single "Ang Pusa Mo" was released in April 2008 under MCA Records Philippines. Their second album also contains the remake of "Pa-Experience" which they retitled to "Pa-Taste". It also has fan favorites such as "FX", "Follow Through", and "Breaking Away".

=== Project 1 ===
In 2008, Marasigan launched his new album with Sandwich, after that, he also launched a one-shot band called "Project 1" with Clem Castro (former Orange and Lemons, now The Camerawalls) on guitars, Francis Reyes (The Dawn) also on guitars, Carlos Calderon (Chicosci) on bass, Jazz Nicolas (Itchyworms) on drums and Uela Basco (Chilitees), Katwo Librando (Narda/Duster) and Marasigan himself on vocals. Their first single "Ang Sarap Dito" was released in March 2008. According to its members, "The new group was formed because we, as artists, feel that we wanted to create something fresh, especially for the young generation. We all believe in a common goal of being positive and changing the way young people think." Their first and only single was used by Coca-Cola Philippines for television and radio commercials and also by Pinoy Big Brother: Teen Edition Plus.

=== Party Pace ===
In 2021, Marasigan alongside Badjao de Castro (IV of Spades), Eco Del Rio (Chicosci), and John Apura founded the band Party Pace. De Castro on Drums, Del Rio on Bass, Apura on Guitar, & Marasigan on Samplers & Synths.

As of May, 2025 they have released their album "MoreHawks"

Their discography contains

- MoreHawks (2025)
- Nauseous (2022)

=== Other businesses ===
==== ALLRYD ====
Allryd (Styled as ALLRYD, from Marasigan's common catchphrase "Alright.") is a sports clothing brand founded by Marasigan, as he really enjoys biking with friends and fellow OPM artists (such as Badjao de Castro, Eco Del Rio, John Apura, etc.) Marasigan posts on YouTube about ALLRYD from time to time, he has a playlist to showcase some of his products and biking trips.

=== Other musical projects ===
==== Squid 9 ====
Squid 9 is a hip-hop influenced band that started out as a studio act and is formed from members of the Eraserheads, Monsterbot and Sun Valley Crew among others. It was soon performing live shows as well. Squid 9 released three albums: "Deleted Scenes", "Kraken Modular" and "Ink Jet". Squid 9 is also part of Electronica Manila and often collaborated with the late Wolfmann+. Squid9 Live is composed of Marasigan on samplers, drum machine and Chaos Pad), Vin Dancel (Twisted Halo and Peryodiko) and Kathy Meneses (Daydreamcycle) on vocals, Buddy Zabala (The Eraserheads, The Dawn, Twisted Halo & Cambio) on bass, keyboards and samplers and Rann Golamco (Drip, Porta, and formerly of Mojofly) on guitars. Marasigan calls his home studio "The Squid Crib".

==== Planet Garapata ====
Marasigan started Planet Garapata also in 1996, a short-lived hip-hop and electronica project that featured Eraserheads bassist Buddy Zabala, Rivermaya drummer Mark Escueta and Eraserheads sound engineer Mark Laccay and Jeng Tan. The project debuted in Francis M.'s 1996 Happy Battle album and featured Marasigan's early rapping skills.

==== Sun Valley Crew ====
He is also part of Sun Valley Crew, a hip-hop/rap group with members Ryan Armamento and RJ Seneres on vocals, Uela Basco also on vocals, Mong Alcaraz on guitars, Dan Gil on Rhodes keyboards, Dex Aguila on Drums, Raymund Marasigan on samplers and Ryan Ventura on bass.

=== Other collaborations ===
He is often dubbed as "The Philippines' busiest musician", with multiple but different, simultaneous bands, in addition to collaborations with various artists such as Francis Magalona, The Pin-Up Girls, Rivermaya, Keltscross, Sugarfree, Itchyworms, Chicosci, Freestyle, Wolfmann, The Dawn, Chillitees, and others.

Marasigan collaborated with Radioactive Sago Project's Lourd de Verya and they created the song "Egis, Er'p!" for a film about Philippine Science High School System, titled "Pisay". Marasigan also sang the theme song for UPCAT movie.

Marasigan (on keyboards and guitars) had a project band with Mark Laccay (bass), Dexter Aguila (drums, now with Chillitees), Thaddeus "Duff" Reantaso (vocals) and Mike Elgar (guitars, before he joined Rivermaya), called Blueberry Juice which lasted until 1994.

Marasigan is the bassist and percussionist of the new band called Gaijin, fronted by Jesse Grinter (guitars and vocals) and Shinji Tanaka (drums). Gaijin means "foreigner" in Japanese. As the name implies, the group is composed of different artists from different heritages. Marasigan is Filipino, Grinter is American, and Tanaka is Japanese. Given the multi-national status of the band, their music is also focused towards the international music scene.

He was chosen by ABS-CBN, together with Rico Blanco and Aia de Leon, for the theme song of the network's 2010 elections campaign, which calls on Filipinos, especially the youth, to register, vote, and make the 2010 elections work. It also features the "Boto Mo, iPatrol Mo" drumbeat.

In 2014 he collaborate with rap prince Abra for Sanib Puwersa (Joined Forces) for beer brand Colt 45, the main competitor of Red Horse Beer which was endorsed by former bandmate Ely Buendia and Joey Pepe Smith.

Marasigan also launched Assembly Generals in 2015, which is dubbed as "Raw Electric Filipino Hiphop", with members Paolo Toledo, Mon Punzalan, and Deng Garcia. Beng Calma of Drip also collaborated on the band's album.

Marasigan's latest collaboration is an alternative new band called "Basement Lung". Its members are Don Marasigan (Vocals), Choy Guerra (guitar, vocals), Menel Emralino (bass), Tyob Sevilla (guitar) and Marasigan (drums)

A few years later during the COVID-19 surge, Marasigan formed the band "Party Pace" which consists of him on the synths and loops, Badjao de Castro (IV of Spades' drummer which went hiatus at the moment), Eco Del Rio (Chicosci's bassist), and John Apura.

=== Television ===
He is also the voice behind the character of Taira Yoshiyuki in the Philippine-edition of Beck: Mongolian Chop Squad aired in Hero TV.

After some various TV appearances as a host, such as being a guest host and part of Studio 23's Breakfast, Marasigan was picked by Myx to be the first and current host of Myx Tugtugan. He is also the "Songwriting Teacher" for ABS-CBN's Pinoy Dream Academy.

Year	Title	Role
2006	Pinoy Dream Academy	Songwriting Teacher

== Musical Equipment ==
=== Drums ===
- Fernando Raymund Marasigan Signature Drum Kit
- Zildjian K Hybrid Cymbals
- Zildjian K Custom Dark Cymbals
- DW 9000 Pedal
- Yamaha Cymbal Stands
- Ludwig Black Beauty Snare Drum (14x5.5)
- Ludwig Neusonic Drum Kit

== Discography ==
With Eraserheads

- Ultraelectromagneticpop! (1993)
- Circus (1994)
- Cutterpillow (1995)
- Fruitcake (1996)
- Sticker Happy (1997)
- Natin99 (1999)
- Carbon Stereoxide (2001)

With Sandwich

- Grip Stand Throw (1999)
- 4 Track Mind (2001)
- Thanks to the Moon's Gravitational Pull (2004)
- Five on the Floor (2006)
- S Marks the Spot (2008)
- Contra Tiempo (2011)
- Fat Salt & Flame (2013)
- Debris (2015)

With Squid 9

- Inkjet (2001)
- Deleted Scenes (2002)
- Kraken Modular (2004)
- Origamidi (2014)
- Weld (2016)
- Circuit Shorts (2018)
- Caramel Lights (2021)

With Cambio

- Derby Light (2004)
- Matic (2007)

With Pedicab

- Tugish Takish (2005)
- Shinji Ilabas Mo Na Ang Helicopter (2008)
- Kaya Mo Mag-Sando? (2012)
- Remuda Triangle (2017)

With Gaijin

- Welcome Back Earthling (2010)
- Sunday Kodama (2013)

With Assembly Generals

- Assembly Generals (2015)
- Fatigue (2019)

With Basement Lung

- Candelaria (2016)

With Party Pace

- Nauseous (2022)
- Morehawks (2025)

== Filmography ==
Year	Title	Role	Production
1995	Run Barbi Run	Himself (Eraserheads)	Cinemax Films
2025	Eraserheads: Combo on the Run	Himself (Eraserheads)	Warner Bros. Pictures
