= Marcus Adoro =

Filipino guitarist (born 1971)

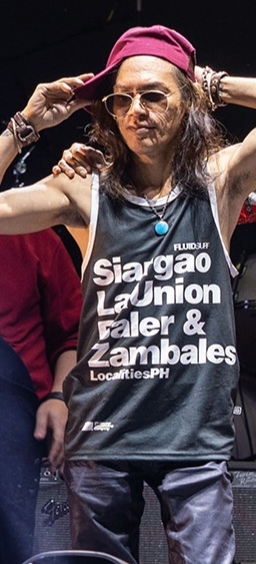
- Marcus Adoro in 2022

Background information
- Also known as: Marcus Highway, Punk Zappa
- Born: Marcus Antonius Corpuz Adoro; December 31, 1971 (age 54); Pangasinan, Philippines
- Genres: Alternative rock; pop; experimental; folk rock; Pinoy rock; punk rock; stoner rock; surf rock
- Occupations: Singer-songwriter; musician; surfer
- Instruments: Vocals; guitar; bass; keyboards; harmonica; percussion
- Years active: 1989–present
- Member of: Eraserheads • Markus Highway
- Formerly of: The Flaming Katols; Surfernando; The Curfew
- Website: marcusadoro.com

Marcus Antonius Corpuz Adoro (born December 31, 1971) is a Filipino musician. He is best known as the lead guitarist of the alternative rock band Eraserheads. Adoro has also released solo music under the name Markus Highway.

== Eraserheads ==
During his days as lead guitarist for the Eraserheads, Adoro only had a few contributions to songwriting. He would compose one song per album, which were usually album fillers, like "Punk Zappa" in the album Circus and "South Superhighway" in the album Natin99. The most contributions he had ever given to the band were in the album Carbon Stereoxide, in which he wrote the songs "Pula," "Wala," and "Escalator Alligator."

Adoro's style of lead guitar was a very significant piece to the Eraserheads' sound. His minimalist approach contrasted with the "flashier" style of most local guitarists of the time. Instead of long, epic solos, Adoro preferred "pretty little ditties" that often complement the tone of the song. His "less is more" method resembles that of many guitarists from Manila's '80s underground punk scene, particularly Bobby Balingit (The Wuds) and Resty Cornejo (Identity Crisis). During the band's later years, Adoro began to acquire a fascination with electric guitar noises and environmental sounds which he would incorporate to his style as the band's music progressed and became more experimental.

== Projects after Eraserheads ==
=== "Kamonkamon" ===
Adoro explains in an interview with Philmusic.com that Kamonkamon was "meant as a hype." According to him, around 2002, BMG records had already bought the whole work, consisting of a comicbook, the comicbook soundtrack and a video documentary CD. The album, though, was not to be released until 2005. In addition, BMG would only publish the work if the comicbook is shortened, which according to Adoro, defeats the purpose of the comicbook soundtrack and the idea of the whole work. He says that Kamonkamon "is a highly philosophical work," so he declined with the condition. "The eventual release of Kamonkamon would be just the tip of the iceberg so to speak," says Adoro.

Adoro was not the first Eraserhead to produce his own solo project. In 2000, lead vocalist Ely Buendia released his album, Wanted Bedspacer.

=== "Belma en Luis" ===
In the same year Kamonkamon was released, Eraserheads vocalist, Ely Buendia, left the band to form The Mongols. Adoro, later, also decided to quit. He would eventually move to La Union and was unheard from until the April 2005. An e-mail from him was sent to PhilMusic.com about a new project he was working on, called "Surfernando: The Adventures of Belma and Luis," with a poster art of a pencil stuck in a person's nose. The EP turned up once again at Sarabia Optical. It is also available in different album covers and titles: Urfer Magazine (Mag:Net Café), Duckdive (Bigsky), American Gurl (United States version), and Submarine (Marikina version)

In the interview with Philmusic.com, Adoro explains that "Belma en Luis" is half of all the songs for a "pinoy surfing album." Surfernando is a character. He wrote the songs in 2003 after three years of surfing. He recorded and released his work on major labels, and has now shopped for a deal with Warner Music. The Surfernando songs were recorded in his new band Markus Highway's debut album called Behold, Rejoice! Surfernando Is Hear Nah.. The sound of Markus Highway ranges from just him and a guitar "to a big full band with horns section and all."

== Career after Eraserheads ==
Adoro's current band name is "Markus Highway (a wordplay on "Marcos Highway," a Philippine road). Adoro explains that "Markus Highway" is just a rock and roll name that he likes and he wants to keep at the moment. He says that he's good with wordplay. He reveals that most of the Eraserheads album titles came from him. "I like changing names because it's an old rock n roll tradition. All the old travelling bluesmen used different aliases and my favorite cool bands do it. I like Markus Highway for the Surfernando song," says Adoro. Adoro had changed his stage name or band name quite often since 2001. His different band names since 2001 include Surfernando, The Gumamela Band, Kamonkamon, The Flaming Katols, Markus Regime (a wordplay on Marcos Regime), The Mamones (a name spoof of Mamon, a Filipino sponge cake, and The Ramones) and Talampunay Band. He eventually settled to Markus Highway since 2007.

Adoro along with former bandmates, Buddy Zabala and Raimund Marasigan performed for an event at the Millennia Club called "Marooned", a production of UP bands from past and present. Buendia was invited to the gig, but was not able to attend. "Batch 88", from Belma en Luis, was one of the songs that was jammed by the trio.

When asked about his career plans in the Philmusic.com interview, Adoro said that he plans to get session musicians to play in the recording of the Surfernando album, get a band ready for gig tours, and work with other willing back-up bands as well. He said that he had been backed by artists such as Mano-manu and Sunflower Day Camp. He just finished a low-key bar tour with the band, Mayonnaise and Sunflower Day Camp.

Adoro unexpectedly appeared in "LivELY: A Fundraising Concert for the Benefit of Ely Buendia" on January 28, 2007. Though not in the list of performers, Adoro suddenly walked on stage before Rivermaya had finished performing. He then borrowed Mike Elgar's guitar and played a reggae rendition of the Eraserheads song, "Huwag Mo Nang Itanong", and a song from his new album.

Marcus Adoro has a new band named Markus Highway under Warner Music Philippines, their first album "Behold, Rejoice! Surfernando Is Hear Nah." was released in February 2008.

== Life after Eraserheads ==
Adoro was interviewed by GMA-7 newscaster Jessica Soho on her show, "Kapuso Mo, Jessica Soho." The topic is all about La Union which is now popular for beach surfers in the Philippines. He is now based in La Union and he enjoys his new life as a local surfer.

In the Philmusic.com interview, Adoro says he surfs, but he doesn't join competitions. He does not compete because he says that surfing is not his profession, and he just enjoys the lifestyle. He has been making documentaries about surfing since 2002.

He also directed the short film "The Artist Is In" which premiered along with Ely Buendia's short film "Waiting Shed". It was followed by "Violator Copy," a compilation of Adoro's unreleased videoworks which featured various local artists and surfers, Jericho Rosales, Dong Abay, and Pepe Smith.

In 2012 he started the project "Greems"- a collection of 100 musical pieces, played in the same chord progression, all in the same key and all pieces clocking in at 57 seconds. The 100 pieces were written and recorded in 21 days. When asked why the handle "johnlennonfull2", he says "it was an instruction from a voice that came to him in his dream. The words to Greems will be released as a book before the year 2012 ends.

== Controversies ==
In September 2019, Adoro's estranged daughter, singer Syd Hartha, and her mother, Adoro's ex-partner actress Barbara Ruaro, both took to social media suggesting physical and psychological abuse inflicted by him. These allegations resurfaced upon the announcement of the 2022 Huling El Bimbo reunion concert, prompting Adoro to post an apology directed only to Syd.

In March 2025, a Reddit user claimed that Adoro had raped her in high school, while also revealing his prior history of sexual abuse against other women. Buendia released a statement on his X account stating that Adoro will be stepping back from the band's upcoming activities. Adoro later returned to the band and issued a statement addressing the allegations ahead of an event in October 2025.

== Filmography ==
=== Film ===
- Run Barbi Run (1995)
- "Dog Days"(2018)
- Eraserheads: Combo on the Run (2025)

=== Television ===
- My Myx (2008)
- Myx Backtrack (2008)
- Myxilog (2008)
- Rock Myx (2008)

== Discography ==
=== Studio album ===
- Behold, Rejoice! Surfernando Is Here Nah. (2008; Warner Music)

=== Singles ===
- Rakenrol
- American Girl
- Bonfire
