= Buddy Zabala =

Filipino musician

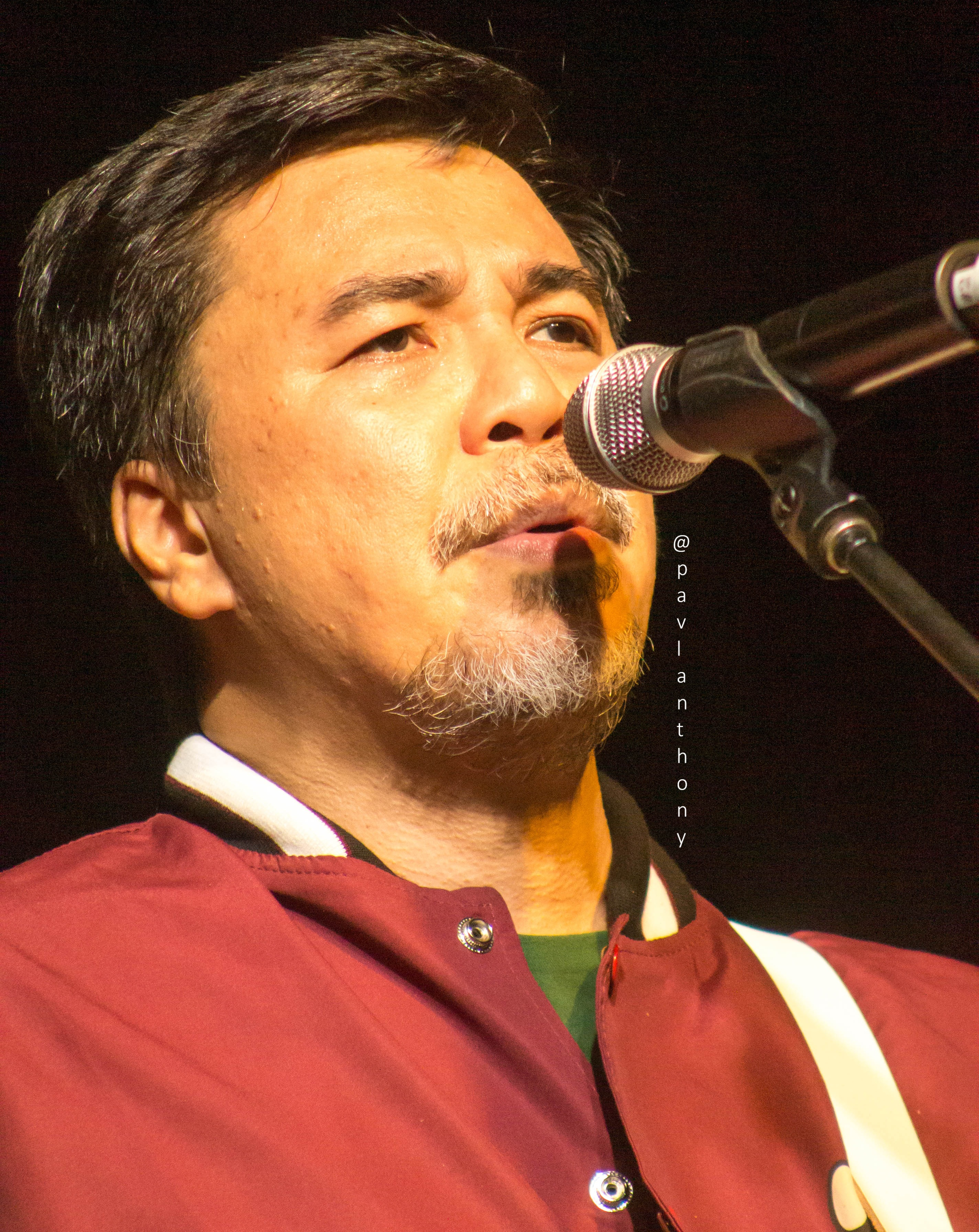
- Buddy Zabala in 2024 performing with the Eraserheads during UAAP Season 87

Background information
- Born: Hector Avanceña Zabala; November 13, 1971 (age 54); Zamboanga City, Philippines
- Genres: Alternative rock; pop; experimental rock; Pinoy rock
- Instruments: Vocals; guitar; bass; keyboards; piano; synthesizers; drums; percussion
- Years active: 1989–present
- Member of: Eraserheads
- Formerly of: Moonstar88; Cambio; Hilera; The Dawn; Sun Valley Crew; Twisted Halo; Rico Blanco

Hector "Buddy" Avanceña Zabala (born November 13, 1971) is a Filipino musician and producer. He is the former bassist of Filipino pop band Moonstar88 which he left in 2024, and widely known as the bassist and backing vocalist of the alternative rock band the Eraserheads. He also served as bassist to The Dawn and Hilera.

== Early life ==
Zabala was born in Zamboanga City, Philippines, and attended University of the Philippines Diliman in Quezon City.

== Career ==
=== Eraserheads bassist (1989–2003) ===
Zabala only began writing and singing songs as an Eraserhead starting with the band's 1996 Christmas album, Fruitcake. The album contains "The Fabulous Baker Boy" and "Fruit Fairy." Buddy later also sang and wrote "Tama Ka" and "Kahit Ano" in the 1999 album, Natin99.

Buddy's bass-playing is prominently featured in the drum & bass opening track of the Natin99 album, "Sinturong Pangkaligtasan". In Aloha Milkyway (the band's first international release), the songs were heavy with his bass work.

=== Post-Eraserheads (2003–present) ===
A few years after the dissolution of the Eraserheads, Buddy Zabala continues to be a prolific musician. He played bass for The Dawn until joining MoonStar 88 in 2016 and, of course, the renamed Eheads, Cambio. Intervening bands in which he was played were the Sun Valley Crew (together with fellow Eraserhead, Raimund Marasigan) and Twisted Halo (with Vin Dancel, Jason Caballa, Joey Odulio, and Mon Lopez.).

For his bass work for Cambio (Derby Light) and Twisted Halo (In Loving Memory of the Fearless Exploits of the Bolo Brigade). Zabala was awarded by the NU Rock Awards as 2004 "Bassist of the Year".

Aside from playing with his bands and doing session work, he focuses his energy in helping younger generation of Pinoy rock bands by way of producing their albums. Some of these are Boldstar's "You Must Have Been a Beautiful Something/What Are You, Really?", Itchyworms' "Little Monsters Under your Bed" (with Romel Sanchez), 6 Cycle Mind's "Panorama", Moonstar88's "Todo Combo", and Imago's "Blush".

He also works as co-producer with his Eraserheads and Cambio colleague, Raimund Marasigan; such as on Itchyworms' "Noon Time Show," Twisted Halo's "Twisted Halo EP", Fatal Posporos' "Paper View," Sugarfree's "Dramachine," Cambio's "Derby Light," and Imago's "Take 2." He was also involved for Marasigan's recent "Five on the Floor" album for Sandwich's.

Zabala had also scored a number of movies, TV commercials, documentary shorts and stage plays.

In late 2015, Zabala replaced Hilera's bassist, Ivan Garcia who left the band for personal reasons. A year later, Zabala left The Dawn for unknown reasons and was replaced by the returning Carlos Balcells.

Started July 2017, working with Raymund Marasigan, currently working as producers for Coke Studio Philippines. Coke Studio Philippines is a brand new musical program that brings artists of different backgrounds and genres together to fuse their music into unique, new Pinoy sounds, shown on YouTube.

== Images ==
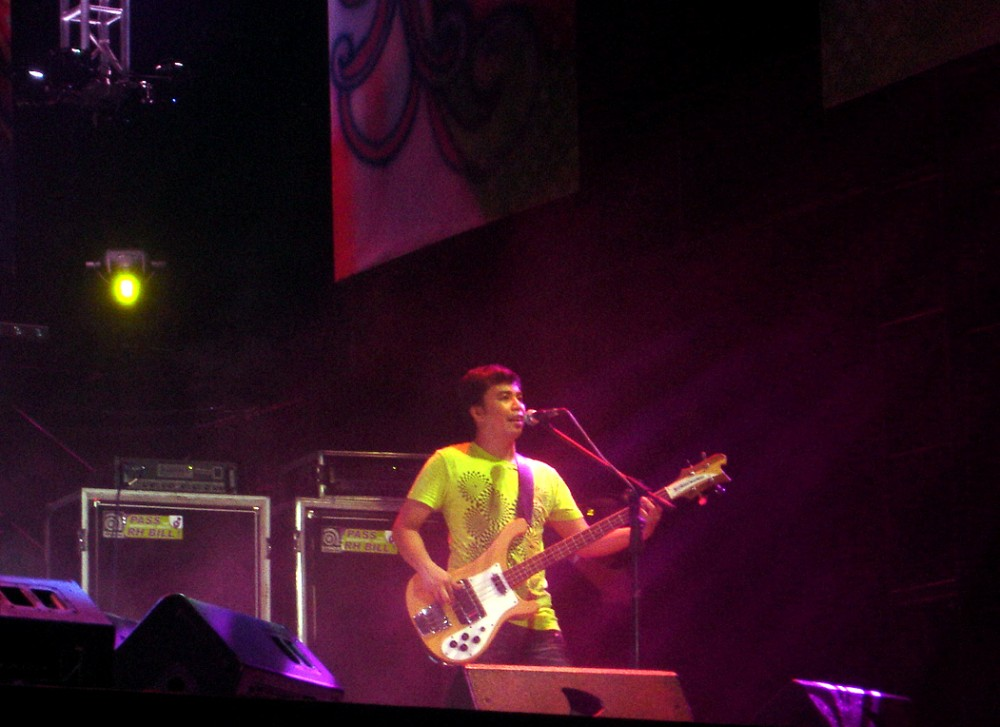
Buddy Zabala during the Final Set Concert in 2009.

== Filmography ==
=== Movies ===
- Run Barbi Run (1995)
- Tulad Ng Dati (2006)
- Eraserheads: Combo on the Run (2025)
