= Huling El Bimbo (Live at 2022 the Eraserheads Reunion Concert) =

Live album by Eraserheads
- Released: March 15, 2024
- Recorded: December 22, 2022
- Venue: SMDC Festival Grounds
- Genre: Alternative rock; indie rock; pop rock
- Length: 149:41
- Label: WEU Event Management Services
- Producer: WEU Event Management; Ant Savy Creatives & Ent. DVent Productions; Myriad Entertainment Corp

Eraserheads chronology
Sabado/1995 (2014)	Huling El Bimbo (Live at 2022 the Eraserheads Reunion Concert) (2024)

Huling El Bimbo (Live at 2022 the Eraserheads Reunion Concert) is the second live album by the Philippine alternative rock band Eraserheads, released on March 15, 2024, to streaming services. It was recorded during the band's Huling El Bimbo reunion concert at the SMDC Festival Grounds on December 22, 2022.

== Background ==
In September 2022, the band members posted an image of their logo, an inverted "E", on social media. A few days later, they announced a reunion concert, called "Huling El Bimbo" after the song of the same name, to be held on December 22 at the SMDC Festival Grounds in Parañaque City. It was billed as their last show in the country. The band went through weeks of rehearsals.

== Concert ==
An estimated 75,000 people attended the reunion concert. The concert was live-streamed outside the country through the streaming platform iWantTFC and was briefly made available via pay per view afterwards.

Directed by Paolo Valenciano, the concert stage featured a giant inverted E. The band were accompanied by Jazz Nicolas of the Itchyworms, Mikey Amistoso of Ciudad, Audry Dionisio of General Luna, cast members of the Ang Huling El Bimbo musical, and the 18-piece AMP orchestra led by conductor Mel Villena.

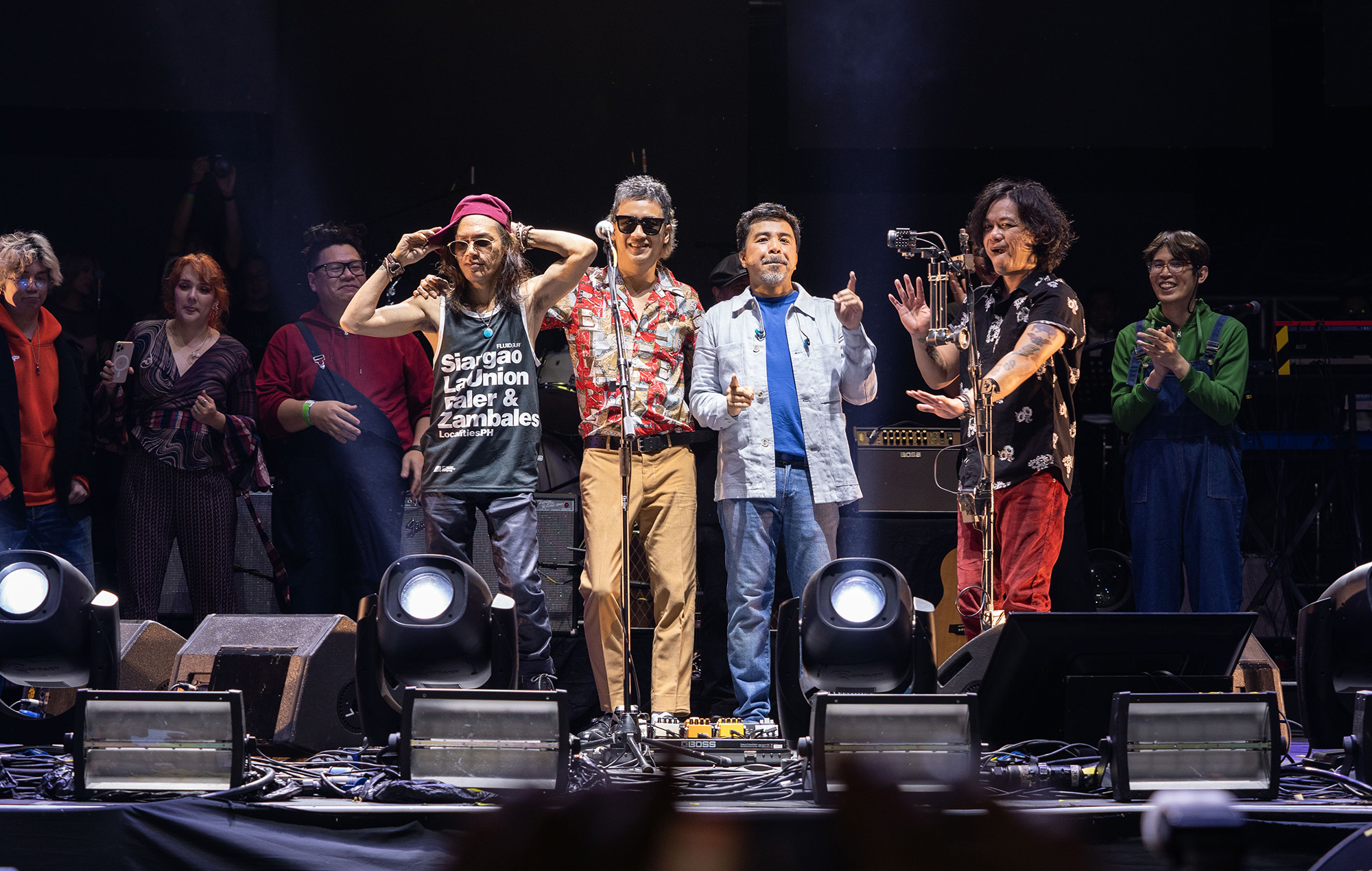
Eraserheads at the Huling El Bimbo concert

The concert featured an opening and intermission set from DJ duo The Diegos. The UP Pep Squad also performed during the intermission. The band played their third album Cutterpillow in its entirety for the first set, saving "Ang Huling El Bimbo" for the last set. They opened with "Superproxy", which featured a hologram of Francis M., his sons Elmo and Arkin, and Buendia's son Eon.

In the second set, the band played deep cuts and fan favorites from their discography. Arkin Magalona and Eon Buendia sang drummer Raymund Marasigan’s parts during "Saturn Return" while Gary Valenciano performed during "Christmas Party". The third set began with "Pare Ko", featuring Jazz Nicolas on drums instead of Marasigan, who went around the stage with a GoPro camera. Cut from the album was a mishap before "Minsan" where "Alapaap" was played prematurely due to a difference between setlists. The concert ended with a five-minute firework display, during which the band announced a world tour for the following year.

== Release ==
The concert was released as a live album to streaming platforms in March 2024. It is also set to be released on vinyl.

In an episode of Marasigan's Offstage Hang podcast, Buendia and Dionisio went over the process of mixing the entire concert. "Removing all that noise and isolating the songs took me and three interns to do," Dionisio said. Buendia revealed that he researched live albums from Prince and Fleetwood Mac while finalizing the mix.

== Track listing ==
Huling El Bimbo (Live at 2022 the Eraserheads Reunion Concert) track listing
No.	Title	Original release	Length
1.	"Superproxy" (featuring Francis M., Elmo Magalona, Arkin Magalona and Eon Buendia)	Cutterpillow	6:14
2.	"Back2Me"	Cutterpillow	3:44
3.	"Waiting for the Bus"	Cutterpillow	3:44
4.	"Fine Time"	Cutterpillow	3:12
5.	"Kamasupra"	Cutterpillow	4:45
6.	"Overdrive"	Cutterpillow	5:17
7.	"Slo Mo"	Cutterpillow	3:39
8.	"Torpedo"	Cutterpillow	4:26
9.	"Huwag Mo Nang Itanong"	Cutterpillow	4:36
10.	"Paru-Parong Ningning"	Cutterpillow	3:04
11.	"Walang Nagbago"	Cutterpillow	3:20
12.	"Poorman's Grave"	Cutterpillow	4:49
13.	"Yoko"	Cutterpillow	3:07
14.	"Fill Her"	Cutterpillow	3:23
15.	"Pop Machine"	Natin99	6:24
16.	"Sembreak"	Circus	4:37
17.	"Sabado"	Sabado/1995	4:09
18.	"Ligaya"	Ultraelectromagneticpop!	4:02
19.	"Light Years"	Fruitcake	4:40
20.	"Saturn Return" (featuring Arkin Magalona and Eon Buendia)	Aloha Milkyway	6:20
21.	"Maling Akala"	Ultraelectromagneticpop!	5:00
22.	"Tama Ka"	Natin99	3:29
23.	"With a Smile"	Circus	6:39
24.	"Insomya"	Circus	2:11
25.	"Christmas Party" (featuring Gary Valenciano)	Fruitcake	6:53
26.	"Spoliarium"	Sticker Happy	5:56
27.	"Magasin"	Circus	4:46
28.	"Pare Ko"	Ultraelectromagneticpop!	7:01
29.	"Minsan"	Circus	4:46
30.	"Alapaap"	Circus	5:25
31.	"Ang Huling El Bimbo"	Cutterpillow	9:33
Total length:			149:41

== Personnel ==
Eraserheads

- Ely Buendia – lead vocals, rhythm guitar, audio engineer, producer
- Buddy Zabala – bass guitar, backing vocals, lead vocals (track 22)
- Marcus Adoro – lead guitar, backing vocals, lead vocals (track 24)
- Raymund Marasigan – drums, backing vocals, lead vocals (tracks 7, 10, 13, 24)

Session musicians

- Jazz Nicolas – keyboards, guitar, backing vocals, drums (track 28)
- Mikey Amistoso – guitar, backing vocals
- Audry Dionisio – guitar, audio engineer, producer
- AMP – strings, horns
- Ang Huling El Bimbo cast – backing vocals

Guest performers

- Francis M. (track 1; archival recording)
- Elmo Magalona (track 1)
- Arkin Magalona (tracks 1, 20)
- Eon Buendia (tracks 1, 20)
- Gary Valenciano (track 25; also played percussion)
