= Eraserheads: The Reunion Concert =

2008 film

Video by Eraserheads
- Released: November 26, 2008
- Recorded: August 30, 2008
- Length: 105:53
- Label: Sony BMG Music Entertainment
- Producer: Vic Valenciano; Ann Angala-Shy

Eraserheads chronology
Eraserheads: The Reunion Concert (2008)	Pop-U-Mentary (2010)

Eraserheads: The Reunion Concert is a 2008 concert film documenting the Philippine alternative rock band Eraserheads' first reunion concert on August 30, 2008. It was released on a limited run in Philippine theaters on November 26, 2008, and on DVD on January 31, 2009. A live album was also released by Sony BMG Music Entertainment (Philippines) in the same month.

== Background ==
In July 2008, the band confirmed they would reunite for a concert at the CCP Open Grounds on August 30. Initially sponsored by Philip Morris, the company later backed out after facing criminal charges by the Philippine Department of Health (DOH) for violating the Tobacco Regulation Act of 2003 prohibiting tobacco companies from sponsoring artistic events; they had also promised a free but invitation-only show for adults and smokers. The concert was later sponsored by Radiohead Productions with tickets being sold and the venue moved to the Bonifacio Global City Open Grounds in Taguig.

== Concert ==
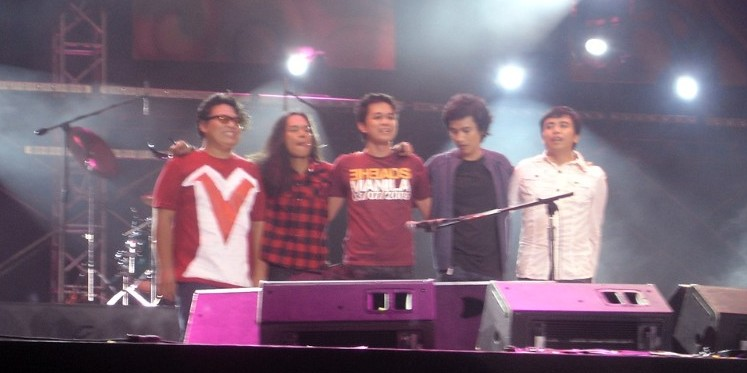
Eraserheads at "The Final Set" Reunion Concert: (R to L) Buddy Zabala, Ely Buendia, Raimund Marasigan and Marcus Adoro together with Jazz Nicolas of Itchyworms (far left) as their session player

The band went ahead with the reunion concert as planned, with Jazz Nicolas of Itchyworms joining in as session musician. They played 15 songs in the first set, with most of the setlist focusing on the band's first three albums.

During the 20-minute intermission, Buendia's sister Lally announced that the concert was being cut short due to her brother experiencing chest pains and that he was being rushed to Makati Medical Center for extreme exhaustion. The remaining band members went to Saguijo and played what would have been the second set of the concert, with Ebe Dancel on vocals.

Buendia later recovered after an angioplasty. The band later went on a second reunion concert in March 2009.

== Track listing ==
=== The Reunion Concert ===
1. "Alapaap"
2. "Ligaya"
3. "Sembreak"
4. "Hey, Jay"
5. "Harana"
6. "Fruitcake"
7. "Toyang"
8. "Kamasupra"
9. "Kailan"
10. "Huwag Kang Matakot"
11. "Kaliwete"
12. "With a Smile"
13. "Shake Yer Head"
14. "Huwag Mo Nang Itanong"
15. "Lightyears"

=== Special features ===
1. Behind the Scenes
2. Rehearsals
3. Photo Gallery

== Personnel ==
Eraserheads

- Ely Buendia – lead vocals, guitar
- Buddy Zabala – bass guitar
- Marcus Adoro – lead guitar
- Raimund Marasigan – drums

with

- Jazz Nicolas – session musician

Production team

- Rudy Tee – executive producer
- Vic Valenciano – producer
- Ann Angala-Shy – producer
- Sancho Sanchez – audio recording producer
- Sherwin Miguel – producer / project manager
- Julie Ann Aguila – event manager
- Pieworks Production – video coverage / editing

== Awards ==
Awards for Eraserheads: The Reunion Concert
Year	Award-giving body	Category	Result
2010	GMMSF Box-Office Entertainment Awards	Record Breaking Concert of the Year	Won
