= Para sa Masa =

Single by Eraserheads

from the album Sticker Happy
- Released: April 1998
- Recorded: 1997
- Genre: Pinoy rock; alternative rock
- Length: 4:56
- Label: Musiko Records; BMG Records (Pilipinas), Inc.
- Songwriter: Ely Buendia
- Producers: Robin Rivera; Eraserheads

Eraserheads singles chronology
"Hard to Believe" (1997)	"Para sa Masa" (1998)	"Julie Tearjerky" (1998)

"Para sa Masa" (English: "For the Masses") is a song by the Philippine alternative rock band Eraserheads. It was released in April 1998 as the third promotional single from their fifth studio album Sticker Happy (1997).

== Composition ==
The song was the first composition that Ely Buendia wrote after learning how to play the piano, later taking him fifty takes to record. "In the end, we had to edit all the good takes on the computer," he said in a track-by-track article for the band's official magazine Pillbox in 1998. "It was like making Frankenstein's monster." The song was inspired by the Beatles.

"Para sa Masa" was described by critics as being written "to appease and win back" the band's fans after the mixed reception to their previous album Fruitcake (1996). It was also considered their unofficial farewell song, with lyrics interpreted as "a love letter with thinly veiled admonition...for the band’s effort and failure to lift the masses and their musical taste."

Buendia later revealed in a Manila Bulletin interview in 2018 that the song was his least favorite from the band: “I’m embarrassed of that song. It’s pretentious. It’s like me telling the masses, ‘I am your savior, but you don’t want to be saved.” He continued that he wrote the song at a turbulent time: “The whole circus of media started to get into me. I just didn’t know what to write anymore. And I started blaming the audience for not being in tune with what I’m doing.”

== Music video ==
A music video for “Para sa Masa” was produced and filmed for the GMA Network TV special “Sigla ng Siglo” commemorating the Philippine Centennial in June 1998. It was shot at the railroad tracks in Tondo, Manila.

== Cover versions ==
- Barbie Almalbis, Kitchie Nadal, Rico J. Puno, Paolo Santos and members of South Border, Cueshé, Orange and Lemons, 6cyclemind, Brownman Revival, MYMP, Imago, Radioactive Sago Project and Sponge Cola covered the song as the final track of the first Eraserheads tribute album Ultraelectromagneticjam!: The Music of the Eraserheads, released in 2005.
