= Maling Akala (Eraserheads song) =

Song by Eraserheads

from the album Ultraelectromagneticpop!
- Released: July 1, 1993
- Recorded: 1993
- Genre: Pinoy rock; reggae
- Length: 4:16
- Label: Musiko Records; BMG Records (Pilipinas), Inc.
- Songwriter(s): Ely Buendia; Raimund Marasigan
- Producer(s): Dem (Note: The Eraserheads used the pseudonym Dem under production duties.)

"Maling Akala" (English: "Misconception") is a song by the Philippine alternative rock band Eraserheads from their debut album Ultraelectromagneticpop! (1993).

== Composition ==
Writer Ely Buendia regarded the song as his favorite from the album. “There’s no story, it’s anti-gossip, anti-controversy,” he said. It has reggae elements.

== Cover versions ==
- Brownman Revival covered the song for the first Eraserheads tribute album Ultraelectromagneticjam!: The Music of the Eraserheads, released in 2005. It became a hit for the band.
- Itchyworms covered the song for the second Eraserheads tribute album The Reunion: An Eraserheads Tribute Album, released in 2012.
