= Pop Machine the Album =

Pop Machine the Album: A Collective of Artists Turning Heads This 2020

Compilation album by various artists
- Released: June 12, 2020
- Length: 49:28
- Label: Noisemakers

Singles from Pop Machine the Album
- 1. "Alapaap" / "Minsan" Released: October 4, 2019; 2. "Tindahan ni Aling Nena" / "Julie Tearjerky" Released: November 8, 2019; 3. "Huwag Kang Matakot" / "Maskara" Released: December 6, 2019; 4. "Poorman's Grave" / "Kailan" Released: February 28, 2020; 5. "Shake Yer Head" Released: March 20, 2020; 6. "Maselang Bahaghari" Released: March 27, 2020; 7. "Light Years" Released: April 3, 2020; 8. "Toyang" Released: May 1, 2020

Pop Machine the Album: A Collective of Artists Turning Heads This 2020 is the third tribute album to the Philippine alternative rock band Eraserheads. It was released on June 12, 2020 by Noisemakers. The album features covers of Eraserheads songs as performed by Filipino artists, which were gradually released throughout late 2019 and early 2020. The title comes from the song “Pop Machine” from the band’s sixth album Natin99 (1999).

== Content ==
Leanne and Naara shared their experience covering "Alapaap" in an interview with Bandwagon Asia. "One of the really exciting things that we got to do for this track was the vocals," they said. "We just went crazy with it. It helped us get into this carefree mindset that is the very essence of this song."

According to Lola Amour bassist Raymond King, his band's cover of "Shake Yer Head" was inspired by the song "Signed, Sealed, Delivered I'm Yours" by Stevie Wonder.

For her cover of "Huwag Kang Matakot", Reese Lansangan interpreted the song's lyrics as being from a mother's perspective to her child as “giving comfort and courage”.

== Track listing ==
Pop Machine the Album track listing
No.	Title	Artist	Length
1.	"Alapaap"	Leanne and Naara	4:31
2.	"Tindahan Ni Aling Nena"	Ciudad	3:15
3.	"Julie Tearjerky"	Oh, Flamingo!	3:41
4.	"Minsan"	Munimuni	4:24
5.	"Maskara"	Tarsius	5:52
6.	"Shake Yer Head"	Lola Amour	3:42
7.	"Poorman's Grave"	The Borrachos	4:41
8.	"Light Years"	Yolanda Moon	3:53
9.	"Huwag Kang Matakot"	Reese Lansangan	3:58
10.	"Kailan"	Space-Ta	3:48
11.	"Toyang"	Pikoy	3:49
12.	"Maselang Bahaghari"	Riot Logic	3:36
Total length:			49:28
