= Combo on the Run =

Song by Eraserheads

from the album Ultraelectromagneticpop!
- Released: July 1, 1993
- Recorded: 1993
- Genre: Pinoy rock; funk rock
- Length: 4:02
- Label: Musiko Records; BMG Records (Pilipinas), Inc.
- Songwriter(s): Ely Buendia; Raimund Marasigan
- Producer(s): Dem (Note: The Eraserheads used the pseudonym Dem under production duties.)

"Combo on the Run" is a song by the Philippine alternative rock band Eraserheads from their debut album Ultraelectromagneticpop! (1993).

== Composition ==
The song was the band's attempt at funk according to drummer Raimund Marasigan. According to writer Ely Buendia, it was inspired by the band's first concert gig outside Manila in Cebu, where they opened for Filipino pop rock band Introvoys in September 1991. “[Cebu’s] scene was very, very different from Manila at that time,” Buendia recounted, with the crowd preferring glam rock acts such as Skid Row, Bon Jovi and local band The Monks. “The crowd was booing us when we played our songs because they’re not into college garage,” he continued.

The song features a backmasked message ("Formoso sucks!"), referring to album producer Ed Formoso. He had abruptly left the Ultraelectromagneticpop! recording sessions, forcing the band to finish producing the rest of the album.

The 2025 documentary on the band got its name from the song.
