= Banda Rito =

Studio album by Apo Hiking Society
- Released: 2001
- Recorded: 2000–2001
- Genre: Original Pilipino Music, Filipino rock, pop
- Length: 42:23 (original pressing) / 46:36 (later release with bonus track Paglisan) / 50:45 (cassette release)
- Label: Universal Records Philippines
- Producer: Bella D. Tan

Apo Hiking Society chronology
Mismo! (1999)	Banda Rito (2001)

Singles from Banda Rito
- 1. "Harana" Released: 2001; 2. "Paglisan" Released: 2002

Banda Rito is the 17th and final studio album from the Filipino trio Apo Hiking Society. The album has 10 tracks and was released under the Universal Records label. The tracks includes original compositions by different Filipino bands that gained prominence during the 1990s in the Philippines such as "Pare Ko" by The Eraserheads, "Harana" by Parokya ni Edgar, "Kisapmata" by Rivermaya, among others.

== Track listing ==
1. Paglisan* - 4:13 Lyrics & Music by: Mike Villegas
2. Pare Ko - 4:56 Lyrics & Music by: Ely Buendia/Arranged by: Bond Samson/JD Villanueva
3. Harana - 4:01 Lyrics & Music by: Eric Yaptangco/Arranged by: Jimmy Antiporda
4. Pagsubok - 3:56 Lyrics & Music by: Naldy Padilla/John Ong/Arranged by: Jay Durias
5. Ako'y Sa 'Yo, Ika'y Akin - 4:39 Lyrics & Music by: John Bunda, Jr./Arranged by: Lorrie Ilustre
6. Karaniwang Tao - 2:49 Lyrics & Music by: Joey Ayala/Arranged by: Bob Aves
7. Kisapmata - 4:06 Lyrics & Music by: Rico Blanco/Arranged by: Jimmy Antiporda
8. Tag-ulan - 4:01 Lyrics & Music by: Wency Cornejo/Arranged by: Lorrie Ilustre
9. Banal Na Aso - 4:21 Lyrics & Music by: Eric Gancio/Dong Abay/Arranged by: Mon David
10. Magasin - 3:52 Lyrics & Music by: Ely Buendia/Arranged by: Bond Samson/JD Villanueva
11. Minamahal Kong Pilipinas - 5:42 Lyrics & Music by: Jim Paredes/Arranged by: Ernie Baladjay
- Paglisan appears as an unlisted, uncredited bonus track at the beginning of the disc on later CD pressings of the album, and is not included in the original track listing. It also appears uncredited track at the beginning and at the end of cassette release.
