= Alex Bruce (rapper) =

Filipino rapper (born 2006)

- Born: Thursten Alex De Villa Bruce; December 25, 2006 (age 19); Batangas City, Philippines
- Genres: Hip hop, Trap, R&B
- Occupations: Rapper; singer; songwriter
- Years active: 2018–present
- Label: Sony

Thursten Alex De Villa Bruce (born December 25, 2006), known professionally as Alex Bruce, is a Filipino rapper and songwriter. She is from Batangas City. Bruce gained attention for rapping at a young age and signed with Sony Music Philippines in 2019. She is known for her singles "Mind as a Weapon", "Yakap", and "Swoosh".

== Early life ==
Thursten Alex De Villa Bruce was born on December 25, 2006, and raised in Batangas. Her father was a member of a rapcore band, and her mother was a fan of R&B music. Bruce began rapping when she was four years old, and her parents introduced her to hip-hop culture. She cited Filipina-American rapper Ruby Ibarra as her main influence. Bruce stated that she writes songs based on her feelings and personal observations.

== Career ==
Bruce released her first single, "Mind as a Weapon", in 2018. The song led to performances at local events. In July 2019, at the age of 12, she signed a contract with Sony Music Philippines. She was the youngest artist on their roster at that time. Following her signing, she released the single "Pull It Off" in May 2019. This track was produced by Jim Poblete and focused on themes of self-expression.

In February 2020, Bruce released the song "Go Crazy". The track was co-written by Canadian songwriter August Rigo. Later in 2020, she released the single "Yakap". The music video for "Yakap" featured a cameo by Justin De Dios of the boy group SB19. The song received a nomination for Best Rap/HipHop Recording at the Awit Awards.

In August 2021, Bruce was a guest performer at SB19's virtual concert titled Back In The Zone. She released her self-titled debut extended play (EP), Alex Bruce, in December 2021. The EP included five songs, such as "Dime Girls" and "Fake Friends".

Bruce participated in a tribute to the band Eraserheads in 2023. She covered their song "Superproxy" alongside the band Of Mercury. In December 2023, she released the song "Bling" in collaboration with Costa Cashman. This was her first collaboration where she shared equal billing with another artist. The track was produced by BRGR and featured minimalist rap styles. In the same year, Bruce became a brand ambassador for Nike. She performed at the halftime show of the 2023 FIBA Basketball World Cup in Manila. She released the single "Swoosh" in March 2024, which was originally written for the Nike campaign. In June 2024, she released a reggae-influenced track titled "Sumfling". Later that year, she collaborated with rapper Zae on the song "A to Z".

== Artistry ==
Bruce's musical style includes hip-hop and trap music. She also incorporates R&B elements into her songs. Her lyrics often use both English and Tagalog. She has stated that she avoids profanity in her music to distinguish herself from other rappers. Her musical influences include Nicki Minaj, Cardi B, Missy Elliott and Ruby Ibarra.

== Discography ==
=== Extended plays ===
| Title | Details |
|---|---|
| Alex Bruce | Released: December 3, 2021; Label: Sony Music Philippines; Format: Digital download, streaming |

=== Singles ===
- "Mind as a Weapon" (2018)
- "Pull It Off" (2019)
- "Go Crazy" (2020)
- "Yakap" (2020)
- "Fake Friends" (2021)
- "Dime Girls" (2021)
- "Betty Bruce" (2023)
- "Bling" (with Costa Cashman) (2023)
- "Swoosh" (2024)
- "Sumfling" (2024)
- "A to Z" (with Zae) (2024)
