= Circus (Eraserheads album) =

Studio album by Eraserheads
- Released: November 4, 1994
- Recorded: 1993 – 1994
- Studios: JR, Makati; Cinema Audio, Manila (“Kailan” and “Kailan Lounge”); PM, Quezon City (“Wating”)
- Genres: Pinoy rock; alternative rock; pop-punk
- Length: 59:45
- Labels: Musiko Records; BMG Records (Pilipinas) Inc.
- Producer: Robin Rivera

Eraserheads chronology
| Ultraelectromagneticpop! (1993) | Circus (1994) | Cutterpillow (1995) |

Singles from Circus
- 1. "Kailan" Released: 1995

Circus is the second studio album by the Philippine alternative rock band Eraserheads, released on November 4, 1994, through BMG Records (Pilipinas) Inc.

Circus received positive reviews upon its release. It eventually turned quintuple platinum with 200,000 copies sold. Its hit singles include "Kailan", "Minsan", "Magasin", "Alapaap" and "With a Smile".

== Music and lyrics ==
Eraserheads returned to the studio to record songs for Circus in 1994, recruiting their former college professor and friend Robin Rivera as producer. They contributed “Wating” to Ishmael Bernal's 1994 film of the same name as its theme song, with actress Carmina Villarroel on guest vocals. It was later released as a bonus track for the album's CD release.

The album's first single "Kailan" was originally written as part of the musical Manhid, directed by Auraeus Solito while the band studied at the University of the Philippines Diliman in 1991. A lounge version was also included in the album as a bonus track.

The album featured classic hits for the band such as "With a Smile", "Magasin", "Alapaap" and "Minsan". "Magasin" was based on a friend of Ely Buendia's who had dated actress Shirley Tesoro, who appeared in bomba films. "Alapaap" became a subject of controversy for its suggestive imagery, which Senator Tito Sotto saw as promoting drug use. The band responded with a letter to the senator stating that it was a misinterpretation and that the song was their "ode to freedom", not drug abuse.

Circus features punk elements found in tracks such as "Bato", "Insomya", and "Alkohol". "Sembreak" refers to semestral breaks common in Philippine secondary education. "Hey Jay" is about a homosexual named Jay that "manages to humanize gay men", even though Buendia later clarified in a 2012 Esquire article that "it's not strictly about that", continuing: "I also identified with those people who couldn’t express themselves freely."

Penned by Raymund Marasigan, "Wishing Wells" was rerecorded from Pop-U!, while "Butterscotch" is a song about religious hypocrites. The album also features a three-part series of filler tracks written by Marcus Adoro: "Punk Zappa", "No Royalty Album Filler No. 9" and "Prof. Banlaoi's Transcendental Medication After Every Six Months or Punk Zappa Three", poking fun at the Philippine alternative scene.

== Artwork ==
The album cover for Circus was created by visual artist Mark Justiniani. It is the first design to use the inverted letter E, invented by Karen Kunawicz, as a trademark for the band.

== Reissues ==
Professional ratings
Review scores
| Source | Rating |
|---|---|
| Allmusic | 2.5/5 stars |

In 2008, BMG reissued Eraserheads's back catalogue, including Circus.

In November 2019, Offshore Music and Sony Music Philippines released a 25th anniversary reissue of the album, which was digitally remastered by Buendia. After the band's reunion concert in 2022, it was re-released on streaming services to include 360-degree spatial sound. The album was also remastered by Bernie Grundman and released on vinyl in March 2023, limited to 3,500 copies.

== Track listing ==
Circus (Note: In the cassette edition, side one runs from Bato to With a Smile, while side two runs from Alkohol to Kailan Lounge.)
| No. | Title | Writer(s) | Length |
|---|---|---|---|
| 1. | "Bato" | Marcus Adoro | 4:04 |
| 2. | "Sembreak" | Raymund Marasigan | 4:04 |
| 3. | "Alapaap" | Ely Buendia | 4:23 |
| 4. | "Hey Jay" | Buendia | 4:39 |
| 5. | "Minsan" | Buendia | 4:15 |
| 6. | "Punk Zappa" | Adoro | 0:10 |
| 7. | "Insomya" | Adoro; Marasigan | 2:03 |
| 8. | "With a Smile" | Buendia | 4:39 |
| 9. | "Alkohol" | Marasigan | 2:53 |
| 10. | "Wishing Wells" | Marasigan | 3:33 |
| 11. | "Kailan" | Buendia; Adoro; Buddy Zabala; Marasigan; Annie Angala; Karing Evangelista; Auraeus Solito | 3:14 |
| 12. | "No Royalty Album Filler No. 9" | Adoro | 1:02 |
| 13. | "Magasin" | Buendia | 4:10 |
| 14. | "Butterscotch" | Buendia | 4:36 |
| 15. | "Sa Wakas" | Buendia; Angala | 2:35 |
| 16. | "Prof. Banlaoi's Transcendental Medication After Every Six Months Or Punk Zappa Three" | Adoro | 1:53 |
| 17. | "Wating" (CD only) | Buendia | 4:14 |
| 18. | "Kailan Lounge" | Buendia; Adoro; Zabala; Marasigan; Angala; Evangelista; Solito | 3:18 |
| Total length: | | | 59:45 (Note: Omitting the tracks Waiting and Kailan Lounge, the run time of the 2019 (25th anniversary) and 2022 (Bernie Grundman) remasters is 52:13.) |

== Personnel ==
Adapted from the liner notes.

Eraserheads

- Ely Buendia – vocals (2–5, 8, 10–11, 13–15, 17–18), acoustic and electric guitars, tambourine
- Marcus Adoro (credited as "Reverend Mark" in 6, 12, 16) – electric guitar, keyboards, vocals (1, 6, 12, 16)
- Buddy Zabala – bass, keyboards
- Raymund Marasigan – drums, keyboards, percussion, vocals (7, 9–10)

Additional musicians

- "Bro of Ray Don" – background vocals (6, 12, 16)
- "Bro of Tots" – background vocals (6, 12, 16)
- "Son of Ely Rb" – background vocals (6, 12, 16)
- "One Star Convert Maki" – background vocals (6, 12, 16)
- "Jennie" – choir vocals (8)
- "Shirlie" – choir vocals (8)
- "Oannie" – choir vocals (8)
- Carmina Villarroel – vocals (17)

Production

- Robin Rivera – production, mixing (5, 15, 17), backing vocals
- Lito Palco – mixing (1–4, 6–14, 16, 18), engineering
- Dindo Aldecoa – engineering
- Jojo Taylo – engineering, backing vocals (7)
- Vincent "Enteng" Villasanta – backing vocals (7)
- Mark Laccay – backing vocals (7)
- Romeo E. Buen
- Buddy Medina – executive production
- Rudy Tee – executive production
- Vic Valenciano – A&R
- Annie Angala – management, choir vocals (8)
- Bernie Grundman – vinyl mastering (2022 remaster)

Design

- Mark Justiniani – cover painting
- Mario Joson – art direction, design
- Gomatao Torres – art direction, design
- Grace Torres – art direction, design
- Snappy Q – photography
- Lucas – photography
