= Minsan =

Song by Eraserheads

from the album Circus
- Released: November 4, 1994
- Recorded: 1994
- Genre: Alternative rock; pop rock
- Length: 4:15
- Label: Musiko Records; BMG Records (Pilipinas) Inc.
- Songwriter(s): Ely Buendia
- Producer(s): Robin Rivera

"Minsan" (English: “Sometimes”) is a song by the Philippine alternative rock band Eraserheads from their second album Circus (1993).

== Composition ==
The song is described as a nostalgic tune “fitting enough to be a graduation anthem”. Written by Ely Buendia, it mentions Kalayaan (translated as “freedom”), a dormitory building where he stayed while studying at UP Diliman.

Buendia later debunked theories that the song was about his friendship with his bandmates in a podcast interview in 2021. “That song was actually about my actual friends — the friends that was with me during my stay at Kalayaan,” he said. His further comments that he was never close with his bandmates sparked online backlash, to which he responded: “The music is all that matters, have you forgotten about that, and who wrote most of it? Just sayin'.”

Drummer Raimund Marasigan responded to Buendia's online comments by confirming that they only have a working relationship. “We would meet and play and jam,” he said, “and you don’t need to talk when you’re jamming. Meron din namang connection din 'yon (There’s still a connection).”

== Cover versions ==
- Callalily covered the song for the second Eraserheads tribute album The Reunion: An Eraserheads Tribute Album, released in 2012.
- Buendia and Marasigan re-recorded the song for the 2012 film Ang Nawawala.
- Munimuni covered the song in 2019 as part of the third Eraserheads tribute album Pop Machine the Album.
