= Magasin (song) =

Song by Eraserheads

from the album Circus
- A-side: "Kailan"
- Released: 1994
- Recorded: 1994
- Genre: Pinoy rock; alternative rock; pop-punk
- Length: 4:08
- Label: Musiko Records; BMG Records (Pilipinas), Inc.
- Songwriter: Ely Buendia
- Producer: Robin Rivera

Magasin (English: "Magazine") is a song by the Philippine alternative rock band Eraserheads from their second album Circus (1994). It is a B-side to the promotional single release of "Kailan".

== Music and lyrics ==
According to writer Ely Buendia's Esquire article in 2012, he based the song on his cousin who had dated actress Shirley Tesoro, who had appeared in bomba films in the late 1980s. Its original title was "Tiktik" and its chorus was inspired by the Marvin Gaye song "Sexual Healing", released in 1982.

== Cover versions ==
- APO Hiking Society covered the song in 2001 for their final studio album Banda Rito.
- Paolo Santos covered the song for the first Eraserheads tribute album Ultraelectromagneticjam!: The Music of the Eraserheads, released in 2005.
- Chicosci covered the song for the second Eraserheads tribute album The Reunion: An Eraserheads Tribute Album, released in 2012.
- Janine Berdin performed the song for the Tawag ng Tanghalan singing competition as part of the Philippine noontime show It's Showtime in 2018.
- Nobita covered the song in 2022 to commemorate Eraserheads's Huling El Bimbo reunion concert.
