= Tita Halaman =

Filipino musician

- Born: Joycia Juatco
- Occupations: Musician; painter; poet
- Years active: 2020–present
- Musical career
- Genres: Alternative pop; synth-pop; indie pop; electropop
- Instruments: Vocals; guitar
- Labels: Off the Record; Sony Music

Joycia Juatco, known professionally as Tita Halaman, is a Filipino musician and visual artist. She is the vocalist and guitarist of the pop band New Lore, which began as the duo No Lore with his brother Jerald Juatco before expanding into a full band. Juatco also works as a visual artist, whose paintings include Come Treat Me Good, I'll Treat You Better and For Even Your Worst Case Scenario Is No Match with Your Power (2022).

== Personal life ==
Juatco developed her passion for drawing in her early years, which made her describe herself as an "introverted" and shy individual whose mode of communication was drawing and not words. She shared that she developed a passion for art as early as childhood. Instead of playing with other children, she often spent her time alone drawing and making paper dolls. Before becoming a full-time artist, she worked as a corporate trainer and motivational speaker for a company based in Bonifacio Global City. She visited galleries around Taguig to learn about contemporary art by speaking with gallery staff and studying exhibitions.

She later adopted the professional name Tita Halaman. According to Juatco, her name "Tita" represented as "old soul" nature while "Halaman" depicted growth and her introverted character. She is based in Manila.

== Career ==
Juatco first started working professionally as an artist in 2020. One of her early works was painting artworks which were then donated to charity for the frontliners affected by COVID-19 pandemic. She took part in The Human Condition, which was a collective exhibition of artworks by Filipino artists in Galerya Amalia.

In 2021, she moved from the corporate world into the arts after signing with DF Art Agency through her artwork titled I Keep Growing, Outgrowing Myself, and becoming a full-time self-taught artist.

In 2022, she held her first solo exhibition, Writings of a Never Not Moving, at Secret Fresh Ronac Art Center. The exhibition featured paintings paired with handwritten poems, with several works incorporating epoxy clay frames extending beyond the canvas. She returned to Secret Fresh Ronac Art Center for her second solo exhibition, Garden of Extremes. The exhibition combined painting and poetry while featuring newly discovered Philippine flora through a collaboration with the Philippine Taxonomic Initiative. Her works have since been exhibited at Art Moments Jakarta, the University of the Philippines Parola College of Fine Arts Gallery, and MOCAF. She was also shortlisted for the Ateneo Art Gallery Marciano Galang Acquisition Prize.

In 2024, Juatco continued her music career as the vocalist and guitarist of the alternative pop band New Lore. The project was originally formed as No Lore, a sibling duo with her brother Jerald Angelo Juatco before becoming an all-female trio with bassist Kim Escalona and drummer Carole Lantican. Later that year, they released the single "For All I Know Is Love" in collaboration with Pawssion Project. Written from the perspective of stray dogs, the song became the organization's official anthem. Juatco also created the cover artwork, which was auctioned to raise funds for the animal shelter.

In 2025, Juatco provided four artworks entitled Papa, My Sunday Champ, Family Portrait of My Father's Sacrifice, and The Shape of My Father's Joy for the Confluence of Her exhibition. Later that year, her works were exhibited at the Philippine Pavilion during Maison & Objet in Paris alongside works by other Filipino artists.

== Artistry ==
Juatco creates paintings of human figures accompanied by handwritten poems. She has said that her work explores emotional intelligence and presents difficult emotions while maintaining a sense of hope. Her paintings are characterized by dark figures, textured brushstrokes, and layers of paint, while her poetry is written in free verse. Each painting is paired with an original poem, which she writes and signs on a separate frame.

Esquire described Juatco as someone working within a "garden of extremes". Her figures appear raw and liberated, often shown in bold movement and twisted forms that reflect human emotion. Manila Bulletin described her work as "paintings with poetry". Each painting is paired with a short poem written by the artist. Her works are figurative.

Juatco brings the same ideas into her music. The band's songs are based on her paintings, poetry, and personal experiences, which the members describe as "music from art and poetry". Bassist Kim Escalona described Juatco as a real-life painter.
