= Ultraelectromagneticjam!: The Music of the Eraserheads =

Ultraelectromagneticjam!: The Music Of The Eraserheads

Compilation album by Various Artists
- Released: November 29, 2005
- Recorded: 2005
- Genre: Alternative rock; indie rock; pop rock
- Length: 78:22
- Label: Musiko Records & Sony BMG Music Entertainment (Philippines)

Ultraelectromagneticjam!: The Music of the Eraserheads is the first tribute album to the Philippine alternative rock band Eraserheads. It was released on November 29, 2005, by Sony BMG Music Entertainment (Philippines), Inc. and produced by Jam 88.3. The album features covers of Eraserheads songs as performed by Filipino artists. The title references the band's debut album Ultraelectromagneticpop! (1993).

== Background ==
The album was initiated by Jam 88.3 program director Eric Perpetua. When he approached the band's record label BMG with the idea, they readily agreed as long as he selected artists “as befitting the stature of the Eraserheads”. “Everyone jumped at the idea,” he recalled.

As for why he chose to make a tribute album to the band, Perpetua replied: “No other band has made an impression and impact as big as they have on the music scene. No other band can create musical magic the way Ely, Marcus, Raymund and Buddy did when they come together. And no one comes close to the Eraserheads, then and now.”

Former vocalist Ely Buendia reacted to the tribute album: "I don’t have a problem with that. I just feel it’s not yet the right time to do such tribute because I’m still doing something worthwhile." Still, he appears in the album on the track “Superproxy 2K6” with rapper Francis M.

The album features Brownman Revival’s cover of “Maling Akala”, which became a hit for the band. 6cyclemind later covered “Alapaap” for the second Eraserheads tribute album The Reunion: An Eraserheads Tribute Album in 2012 with Eunice Jorge of Gracenote.

== Track listing ==
No.	Title	Artist	Length
1.	"Alapaap"	6cyclemind	5:02
2.	"Magasin"	Paolo Santos	4:32
3.	"Spoliarium"	Imago	5:47
4.	"Overdrive"	Barbie Almalbis	3:00
5.	"With a Smile"	South Border	4:24
6.	"Tikman"	Sugarfree	3:23
7.	"Ligaya"	Kitchie Nadal	4:32
8.	"Torpedo"	Isha	3:31
9.	"Superproxy 2K6"	Francis M. with Hardware Syndrome featuring Ely Buendia	5:36
10.	"Huwag Kang Matakot"	Orange and Lemons	3:35
11.	"Pare Ko"	Spongecola	6:02
12.	"Huwag Mo Nang Itanong"	MYMP	5:09
13.	"Hard To Believe"	Cueshé	3:39
14.	"Alkohol"	Radioactive Sago Project	04:05
15.	"Maling Akala"	Brownman Revival	4:48
16.	"Ang Huling El Bimbo"	Rico J. Puno	6:12
17.	"Para sa Masa"	Various Artists	5:05
Total length:			78:22
