= Kaliwete (Eraserheads song) =

Single by Eraserheads

from the album Sticker Happy
- Released: August 1997
- Recorded: 1997
- Genre: Pinoy rock; alternative rock
- Length: 3:07
- Label: Musiko Records; BMG Records (Pilipinas), Inc.
- Songwriter: Ely Buendia
- Producer: Robin Rivera

Eraserheads singles chronology
"Harana" (1997)	"Kaliwete" (1997)	"Hard to Believe" (1998)

Music video
- "Kaliwete" on YouTube

"Kaliwete" (English: "Left-Handed") is a song by the Philippine alternative rock band Eraserheads. It was released in August 1997 as the first promotional single from their fifth studio album Sticker Happy (1997).

== Composition ==
The song is part of a trilogy of tracks from Sticker Happy written by Ely Buendia that are centered on handedness, which include “Kananete” ("right-handed") and “Ambi Dextrose” (a pun on "ambidextrous"). In a track-by-track article for the band's official magazine Pillbox in 1998, Buendia recounted how the songs were written:

I was at this birthday party in Kamuning and I was a bit drunk. I think some people started talking about lefties and righties, and so just to keep things interesting, I announced that I had already written songs about it, even though I hadn't. And would you believe I also told them I had another one coming called "Ambidextrous" to make the trilogy complete?

A week after, I knew I was in trouble because my friends were expecting these songs on the new album. Luckily, a lot of funny things happened that were funny enough to write about.

The song mentions Filipino singer Rico J. Puno, a "childhood idol" of Buendia. "He was really nice and funny and he gave me a little piece of advice that I'll never forget," he continued. "It's in the song."

== Music video ==
The music video for “Kaliwete” was directed by Matthew Rosen. It features the band performing with "quirky props" such as light bulbs used as microphones, a toilet bowl with a speaker inside, and a dentist's chair.

== Cover versions ==
- Hilera covered the song for the first Eraserheads tribute album Ultraelectromagneticjam!: The Music of the Eraserheads, released in 2005.
