= Futuristic (disambiguation) =

Futuristic is the adjectival form of future

Futuristic may also refer to:

- The Futuristics
- Futuristic (song)
- Futuristic (rapper)
- Futuristics
