= Karen Kunawicz =

- Education: Bachelor's degree in Business Management, Ateneo de Manila University, 1990
- Occupation: Writer
- Known for: poet, writer, pop culture journalist, comic book editor, producer, and former television show host

Karen Kunawicz is a Philippine poet, writer, pop culture journalist, comic book editor, producer, and former television show host. She is sometimes popularly referred to as the Philippines' "Queen of the Goths."

Valeros and Gruenberg's Filipino Writers in English (New Day, 1987) says of her writing: "Some have described her writing as dark and depressingly beautiful, with common themes focusing on heartache and missed soulmates."

== Education ==
Kunawicz graduated cum laude from the Ateneo de Manila University with a bachelor's degree in business management in 1990. She was a candidate for Top Ten Students of the Philippines for 1990. She later took a short, intensive filmmaking course at the New York Film Academy in 2000.

== Career ==
=== Television ===
On a national level, Kunawicz is probably best known as one of the three female hosts for a talk show called XYZ Young Women's TV, which aired over PTV-4 and later on the ABS-CBN News Channel (ANC). This also led to the publication in 2000 of the book The XYZ Guide for Young Women in which she was a contributor.

In 2000 she was also the producer of Quark Henares' Palanca Award winning independent film "A Date With Jao Mapa."

=== Writer and editor ===
Prior to her television exposure, she was known for her columns in the Manila Times and Mirror Weekly. Her In The Dark column in the Manila Times, a daily broadsheet, came out every Saturday until the paper closed down in 1999.

Her On The Verge column for Mirror Weekly, a magazine at which she was also Youth Editor, ran for six years until she left the publication in 2000. Her work on On The Verge led to the 1999 release of a book of the same title.

Aside from these columns, she continues to contribute articles to various newspapers and magazines on a freelance basis. Among the publications these works have come out in include the Manila Chronicle, Daily Globe, Philippine Graphic, Philippine Daily Inquirer, and Music News Asia.

In addition, Kunawicz currently serves as editor-in-chief of Mango Jam, a serial Comic book made by independent Comic book publisher Mango Comics. Mango Jam is marketed as the Philippines' first all-girls comics, created by girls. "The entire crew is all female, all Pinay," says Kunawicz. "...And even if we're competing against big-name international titles, we're proud of every issue that flies off the shelf!" "The publisher saw an opportunity in the market for young women comic book readers and they wanted to get this message of girl power across, and there was no better way to do it than start off with women writers and women artists."

=== Music ===
Even before Kunawicz' columns, however, she was already well known as a prominent member of the Manila music scene. In 1991 she co-founded the Dredd Poets Society with Patrick Reidenbach and Robbie Sunico. Together they produced monthly poetry readings and rock concerts at Club DREDD, the Quezon City club that became the epicenter of Manila rock scene.

Kunawicz also served as the manager of local rock band for Love Bigots Love from 1994 until 1996, which was the same year Clubb Dredd closed down.

== Selected works ==
=== Author ===
- Kunawicz, Karen (1999). On the Verge. Alamat. ISBN 9789719197324.

=== Coauthor ===
- Jimenez-David, Rina; Karen Kunawicz (1999). Body Talk 2. Anvil Publishing. Archived from the original on November 19, 2002.

=== Contributor ===
- Kunawicz, Karen (2000). The XYZ Guide for Young Women. Alamat.
