= Spoliarium (Eraserheads song) =

Song by Eraserheads

from the album Sticker Happy
- Released: September 11, 1997
- Recorded: 1997
- Genre: Pinoy rock; alternative rock
- Length: 5:27
- Label: Musiko Records; BMG Records (Pilipinas), Inc.
- Songwriter: Ely Buendia
- Producer: Robin Rivera

Audio sample
- "Spoliarium": file; help

"Spoliarium" is a song by the Philippine alternative rock band Eraserheads from their fifth album Sticker Happy (1997).

== Composition ==
The song got its name from the Juan Luna painting of the same name. It features six guitar parts and a mix of live drums and drum loops inspired by trip hop, according to drummer Raimund Marasigan.

"Spoliarium" became the subject of an urban legend referencing Filipino-American actress Pepsi Paloma's rape case in 1982. The song's bridge mentions the names Enteng and Joey, which are nicknames for actors Vic Sotto and Joey de Leon, whom Paloma publicly accused of sexually assaulting her.

Writer Ely Buendia later clarified the meaning of the song in a podcast interview in 2021, stating that it is "all about getting piss-drunk" on Goldschläger. “‘Spoliarium’ is one of those cases where really the myth has sort of taken over the facts and I kinda like it," he continued. "I kinda like the myth, because the actual meaning of the song is also again, just really mundane." The names Enteng and Joey refer to the band's roadies, Vincent Villasanta and Joey Navera, who designed the artwork for the band's third album Cutterpillow (1995).

== Music video ==
The music video for "Spoliarium" was directed by Matthew Rosen. It was shot in black and white at the Cultural Center of the Philippines in February 1999 and was aired on commercial TV. It shows a woman (Lara Fabregas) being approached and followed by mysterious men in a theatre.

== Cover versions ==
- Imago covered the song for the first Eraserheads tribute album Ultraelectromagneticjam!: The Music of the Eraserheads, released in 2005.
