= New Lore =

Filipino pop band

- Also known as: No Lore (2021–2024)
- Origin: Metro Manila, Philippines
- Genres: Alternative pop; synth-pop; indie pop; electropop
- Years active: 2021–present
- Labels: Off the Record; Sony Philippines
- Members: Tita Halaman; Kim Escalona; Carole Lantican
- Past members: Jerald Angelo Juatco

New Lore (stylized in all caps) is a Filipino pop band from Metro Manila. The band consists of vocalist and guitarist Tita Halaman, bassist Kim Escalona, and drummer Carole Lantican. Before adopting its current name, they performed as No Lore, a sibling duo composed of Tita Halaman and Jerald Angelo Juatco. The band was reformed and renamed following a lineup change in late 2024.

The band is known for blending synth-pop with visual art and poetry. The band has described their music as being inspired by paintings, personal writing, and everyday experiences. Their debut studio album grief cake (2025) received favorable coverage from Philippine music publications and was featured on Spotify editorial playlists in several Asian countries. In 2026, the band was selected as part of the Spotify Radar Philippines project and their second studio album good good juju.

== History ==
=== 2021–2024: As No Lore and Outlines ===
The band originated in 2021 as No Lore, an alternative pop duo formed by siblings Tita Halaman and Jerald Angelo Juatco. The name was derived from the phrase "No Folklore", reflecting the pair's belief of creating stories through action rather than simply imagining them.

They were inspired by Tita Halaman's paintings and poems; thus, they came up with the genre of electronic pop art. Their songs prior to their first extended play Outlines, released in 2022 include "Lou", "Paumanhin", "Papatungo", and "A Leo". The duo appeared on Rappler Live Jam in 2023. Their song "Paumanhin" surpassed 100,000 streams on Spotify, and featured in the soundtrack of the iWantTFC series Sleep with Me.

In 2024, bassist Kim Escalona and drummer Carole Lantican joined the project as permanent members. Later that year, Jerald Juatco departed, ending No Lore as a sibling duo.

=== 2025–present: Rebranding as New Lore, grief cake and good good juju ===
Following the lineup change, the group adopted the name New Lore. The band's final release under the No Lore name was issued in December 2024, before they debuted as New Lore with the single "Ambitious" in January 2025. Later that year, New Lore released they debut studio album grief cake, which they described as a "coming-of-age spiral disguised as a pop record with layers of pain, tenderness, and transformation baked into something strangely sweet." The album was also featured on Spotify editorial playlists in the Philippines, Singapore, Malaysia and Indonesia.

In early 2026, the band began releasing singles for they second studio album, including "Substack Girl", "i know u by heart", "girlhood", and "nariyan". During the promotional campaign, they described the record as moving away from the "trauma pop" of grief cake toward a more hopeful and optimistic sound. The band's second studio album good good juju was released in 2026, and features a collaboration with singer Barbie Almalbis on the song "your playlist is a lie".

== Artistry ==
=== Musical style and themes ===
During the duo's time as No Lore, they described their sound as alternative and dream pop, and wrote songs about love, heartbreak, loss, and hope, while their music had a lot of storytelling through poetry and art. In 2025, the project was reintroduced as New Lore, a synth-pop trio with a new lineup.

New Lore's music has been described as alternative pop, synth-pop, indie pop, electropop. The band's writing draws from personal experiences and explores subjects including friendship, grief, and art. Their songs are rooted in Halaman's paintings, poetry, and personal experiences, with the band describing its work as "music from art and poetry". Their debut album grief cake (2025) was described by the band as "trauma pop". While developing their second album good good juju (2026), the members described their newer material as "healing pop" or "therapy pop", emphasizing optimism and recovery while retaining the introspective nature of their earlier work.

=== Influences ===
The members have cited The Marías and Hayley Williams. Several songs by New Lore have been compared to or drawn inspiration from other artists, including Imogen Heap, The Flaming Lips, The Internet, The Cardigans, Japanese Breakfast, Barbie's Cradle, and Up Dharma Down. The band has also said that it intentionally avoids imitating other artists or limiting its music to a single genre.

== Band members ==
Current members

- Tita Halaman – vocals, guitar (2021–present)
- Kim Escalona – bass (2024–present)
- Carole Lantican – drums (2024–present)

Former members

- Jerald Angelo Juatco – vocals, guitar, keyboards (2021–2024)

== Discography ==
=== Studio albums ===
List of studio albums
Title	Year	Ref.
grief cake	2025	
good good juju	2026	
Very Ancient Way of Crying	2026	

=== Extended plays ===
List of extended plays
Title	Year	Notes	Ref.
Outlines	2022	Released under No Lore	

=== Singles ===
==== As No Lore ====
List of singles released as No Lore
Title	Year	Album/EPs	Ref.
"A Leo"	2021	Outlines	
"Lou"	2021	Outlines	
"Paumanhin"	2022	Outlines	
"Simula Ngayon"	2023	Non-album single	
"Tahimik"	2024	Non-album single	
"Magbalik" (Note: Originally performed by Callalily)	2024	Non-album single	

==== As New Lore ====
List of singles released as New Lore
Title	Year	Album/EPs	Ref.
"Ambitious"	2025	grief cake	
"grief cake"	2025	grief cake	
"Who Hurt U"	2025	grief cake	
"Loving, Hurting"	2025	grief cake	
"Dirty"	2025	grief cake	
"Oh Maturity"	2025	grief cake	
"nariyan"	2026	good good juju	
"Substack Girl"	2026	good good juju	
"i know u by heart"	2026	good good juju	
"girlhood"	2026	good good juju	
"your playlist is a lie" (with Barbie Almalbis)	2026	good good juju	
"gud ppl"	2026	good good juju	
"my crush and i will crush the system baby"	2026	good good juju	
"june"	2026	good good juju	
