= Pare Ko =

Single by Eraserheads

from the album Ultraelectromagneticpop!
- B-side: "Tindahan ni Aling Nena"
- Released: 1993
- Genre: Pinoy rock
- Length: 5:26
- Label: Musiko Records; BMG Records (Pilipinas) Inc.
- Songwriter: Ely Buendia
- Producer: Ed Formoso

Eraserheads singles chronology
"Ligaya" (1993)	"Pare Ko" (1993)	"Toyang" (1993)

Pare Ko (English: "My Pal") is a song by the Philippine alternative rock band Eraserheads. A censored version of the song titled Walang Hiyang Pare Ko (“My Shameless Pal”) was released as the second promotional single from their debut album, Ultraelectromagneticpop! (1993).

== Music and lyrics ==
About the song, writer Ely Buendia said: "I just want to come up with a love song that's different. It was an honest love song I suppose. And whenever you feel bad or happy about something, I think it's natural for someone to utter these words. Also I want to know if I could get away with it."

The song was inspired by a friend of Buendia's. "He was heartbroken so I wrote the song about him," he said in his acceptance speech when the band received the Gawad Oblation award from University of the Philippines in August 2024. He also revealed that he sent a demo cassette of the song to his professor to pass his Spanish class.

The song features expletives, such as "tangina" (local slang roughly translated as "son of a bitch"), "leche" (local slang conveying frustration, similar to "damn"), and "nabuburat" (local slang expressing annoyance, although the root word "burat" has sexual connotations). This was unheard of in Philippine mainstream music at the time. The Philippine Association of the Record Industry (PARI) unsuccessfully attempted to censor the song and the album. As a result, the band recorded a censored version titled "Walang Hiyang Pare Ko", which was also included with the original version in the album release (it was later excised from the 25th anniversary reissue).

== Legacy ==
=== Covers ===
- APO Hiking Society covered the song in 2001 for their final studio album Banda Rito.
- Sponge Cola covered the song for the first Eraserheads tribute album Ultraelectromagneticjam!: The Music of the Eraserheads, released in 2005.
- Johnoy Danao covered the song for the second Eraserheads tribute album The Reunion: An Eraserheads Tribute Album, released in 2012.
- Former Rivermaya frontman Jason Fernandez covered the song as a Wishclusive on Wish 107.5 in 2018.

=== In popular culture ===
The song became the basis for the 1995 movie of the same name starring Claudine Barretto, Mark Anthony Fernandez and Jomari Yllana.
