= Ultraelectromagneticpop! =

1993 debut studio album by Eraserheads

Studio album by Eraserheads
- Released: July 1, 1993
- Recorded: July 1992 – April 1993
- Studios: AD & AD, Manila; JR, Makati
- Genres: Pinoy rock; jangle pop; indie pop; alternative rock
- Length: 44:54
- Labels: Musiko; BMG Pilipinas
- Producers: Dem (Note: The Eraserheads used the pseudonym Dem under production duties.); Ed Formoso

Eraserheads chronology
Ultraelectromagneticpop! (1993)	Circus (1994)

Alternative cover
- 25th anniversary teaser cover

Singles from Ultraelectromagneticpop!
- 1. "Ligaya" Released: 1993; 2. "Pare Ko" Released: 1993; 3. "Toyang" Released: 1993; 4. "Shirley" Released: 1994

Ultraelectromagneticpop! is the debut studio album by the Philippine alternative rock band Eraserheads, first released on July 1, 1993, by BMG Records (Pilipinas) Inc. It was produced by the band (credited as “Dem”) and Ed Formoso.

Eraserheads formed in 1989 at University of the Philippines Diliman and signed a recording contract with BMG in 1992. They recorded Ultraelectromagneticpop! from July 1992 to April 1993. The recording was hampered by several reasons such as frequent brownouts and Formoso leaving the studio for undisclosed reasons.

The album spawned hit singles such as "Ligaya”, “Toyang”, and “Pare Ko”, best known for its explicit lyrics. It is often credited with revitalizing the alternative rock genre in the Philippines during the 1990s.

== Background ==
The members of Eraserheads met while attending University of the Philippines Diliman in Quezon City. They formed a band in 1989 and named themselves Eraserheads after the David Lynch film Eraserhead (1977).

On January 26, 1991, the band recorded a nine-song demo tape at the house garage of drummer Raymund Marasigan, in Candelaria, Quezon. The demos were said to be influenced by The Cure as well as ska and reggae genres. The demo tape was distributed and circulated around record labels, although it was dismissed; one record label commented that the demos were “not pop enough”. Marasigan gave a copy to his Humanities professor Robin Rivera, who assisted them in remixing the demo recordings to a higher quality. The polished demo tape was titled Pop-U!, as an irreverent response to those who turned them down.

Pop-U! earned the band a spot at Club Dredd, where they initially saw little success. They decided to write their own material which soon earned them a cult following. One song, "Pare Ko", became popular for its explicit lyrics. The band soon landed an out-of-town gig as an opening act for Introvoys in Cebu. Vocalist Ely Buendia wrote the song “Combo on the Run” about their experiences there.

Meanwhile, Buendia worked as a copywriter for BMG and wrote songs with the band at night. Their material later caught the attention of A&R director Vic Valenciano, who commented that they were "technically very raw but that there was something promising in them." In 1992, BMG signed the band into a three-year record deal.

== Recording ==
Eraserheads recorded Ultraelectromagneticpop! from July 1992 to April 1993. They initially worked with Ed Formoso for production duties.

The recording sessions were hampered by several incidents, such as brownouts and the recording equipment breaking down. Midway through a session, Formoso abruptly left the studio for undisclosed reasons, forcing the band to finish producing the rest of the album. They expressed their displeasure by inserting a backmasked message (“Formoso sucks!”) into “Combo on the Run”.

The album title is a pun on the ultraelectromagnetic tops, a fictional weapon from the Japanese anime television series Voltes V, which was popular in the Philippines at the time. Working titles included Lutong Bahay, Pekaloid, The Klasik Kapums Konsert Kookout, and Eraserheads Greatest Hits Vol. 5.

== Music and lyrics ==
In Ultraelectromagneticpop!, local critics found elements of alternative rock, college rock, reggae, and rockabilly. The album drew comparisons to the Beatles, the Cure, the Clash, Red Hot Chili Peppers, and APO Hiking Society.

Some of the tracks such as “Pare Ko”, “Tindahan ni Aling Nena”, and “Toyang” were rerecorded from Pop-U!. “Pare Ko” is a ballad and became notable for its explicit lyrics, which was unheard of in Philippine music at the time. The album's initial release included both original and censored versions, with the latter named “Walang Hiyang Pare Ko” (later excluded from the album's 25th anniversary remaster). Buendia described “Tindahan ni Aling Nena” as a “shameless Beatles parody”. “Toyang” features interpolated and reworked Filipino folk songs (such as "Pen Pen de Sarapen" and Ilocano standard "Ti Ayat Ti Maysa Nga Ubing"), as well as the popular song “Too Young” (composed by Sidney Lippman and written by Sylvia Dee) and “Silly Love Songs” by Paul McCartney's band Wings; the band credited Lippman, Dee and McCartney in the album liner notes. Marasigan described the song as “an anti-pop statement against the people who said we couldn’t do a pop song.”

"Easy Ka Lang" is influenced by the local Manila Sound genre. "Maling Akala" has reggae elements, while the final track "Combo on the Run" is an attempt at funk according to Marasigan. The album also features two filler tracks, “Ganjazz” and “Honky-Toinks Granny”, which feature vocals from producer Jojo Bacasmas.

== Release ==
Professional ratings
Review scores
Source	Rating
Allmusic	link

BMG initially printed 5,000 copies of the album for its release. It ended up selling 300,000 copies by the end of the year.

=== Reissues ===
In 2008, BMG reissued Eraserheads's back catalogue, including Ultraelectromagneticpop!

In November 2018, Buendia's record label Offshore Music and Sony Music Philippines released a 25th anniversary reissue of the album, which was remastered by Bernie Grundman. The reissue was later released on vinyl in November 2019, limited to 2,500 copies. After the band's reunion concert in 2022, it was re-released on streaming services to include 360-degree spatial sound. It was again repressed on white vinyl in 2026.

== Legacy ==
The success of Ultraelectromagneticpop! paved the way for other Filipino rock bands such as Rivermaya, Siakol, Yano, Teeth, Rizal Underground, and Color It Red to similar mainstream prominence in the Philippines. Its master tapes are currently in archive at the University of the Philippines Center for Ethnomusicology for its cultural importance.

The album name inspired the first Eraserheads tribute album Ultraelectromagneticjam!: The Music of the Eraserheads, released in 2005 and featuring 17 of their songs covered by Philippine artists.

== Track listing ==
Original release (Note: In the cassette edition, side one runs from Easy Ka Lang to Toyang, while side two runs from Ligaya to Combo on the Run.)
No.	Title	Writer(s)	Producer(s)	Length
1.	"Easy Ka Lang"	Ely Buendia	Ed Formoso	4:27
2.	"Maling Akala"	Buendia; Raymund Marasigan	Dem	4:16
3.	"Pare Ko"	Buendia	Formoso	5:26
4.	"Shake Yer Head"	Buendia	Formoso	4:04
5.	"Ganjazz"	Marcus Adoro	Dem	0:41
6.	"Toyang"	Adoro; Buendia	Dem	3:48
7.	"Ligaya"	Buendia	Formoso	4:30
8.	"Tindahan ni Aling Nena"	Buendia	Formoso	3:06
9.	"Honky-Toinks Granny"	Adoro	Dem	1:11
10.	"Shirley"	Buendia; Marasigan	Dem	3:58
11.	"Walang Hiyang Pare Ko" (omitted from the 25th anniversary remaster)	Buendia	Formoso	5:25
12.	"Combo on the Run"	Buendia; Marasigan	Dem	4:02
Total length:				44:54

== Personnel ==
Adapted from the liner notes.

Eraserheads

- Ely Buendia – lead vocals, rhythm guitar, acoustic guitar (track 4), lead guitar (track 6)
- Buddy Zabala – bass guitar, backing vocals, acoustic guitar (track 4)
- Marcus Adoro – lead guitar, backing vocals, hand claps (track 4), tambourine (track 8), lead vocals (track 9)
- Raymund Marasigan – drums, backing vocals, melodica (track 2), tambourine (track 4), hand claps (track 4), lead guitar (track 6), piano (track 10)

Additional musicians

- Jojo Bacasmas – lead vocals (track 5), backing vocals (tracks 6–7)
- Maryana Arinez – saxophone (track 3)

Production

- Dem – production (tracks 2, 5, 6, 9, 10, 12)
- Ed Formoso – production (tracks 1, 3–4, 7–8, 11)
- Robin Rivera - additional production
- Willie Munji – mixing, recording
- Boy Tanquinitic – recording
- Jhoffer Aquino – recording
- Ronnie Soriano – recording
- Buddy Medina – executive production
- Rudy Tee – executive production
- Vic Valenciano – A&R
- Annie Angala – management

Design

- Mario Joson – art direction, design
- Chitty Ramirez – art execution
- Mitch Amurao – photography

== Charts ==
Chart performance for Ultraelectromagneticpop!
Chart (2026)	Peak position
Australian Vinyl Albums (ARIA)	16
