= Ligaya =

Single by Eraserheads

from the album Ultraelectromagneticpop!
- B-side: "Easy Ka Lang"
- Released: 1993
- Genre: Pinoy rock; alternative rock
- Length: 4:29
- Label: Musiko Records; BMG Records (Pilipinas), Inc.
- Songwriter: Ely Buendia
- Producer: Ed Formoso

Eraserheads singles chronology
"Ligaya" (1993)	"Pare Ko" (1993)

Audio sample
- "Ligaya": file; help

Lyric video
- "Ligaya" on YouTube

"Ligaya" (English: "Joy") is a song by Filipino alternative rock band Eraserheads. It was released as their first promotional single from their debut album Ultraelectromagneticpop! (1993).

== Music and lyrics ==
The song is described as "a quintessential anthem of youthful romance" while "perfectly capturing all the ins and outs of campus courtship". It features the lyric "Gagawin ko ang lahat pati ang thesis mo (I'll do anything, even your thesis)", which writer Ely Buendia later jokingly referenced in a tweet in 2016: "Eh sariling thesis ko nga di ko magawa-gawa sa’yo pa (I can't even do my own thesis, why should I do yours?)."

== Promotion and release ==
The band performed the song during their first TV appearance in the noontime show Sa Linggo nAPO Sila.

"Ligaya" was featured with the band in a TV commercial for the Chippy snack in 1996.

== Cover versions ==
- Kitchie Nadal covered the song for the first Eraserheads tribute album Ultraelectromagneticjam!: The Music of the Eraserheads, released in 2005.
- Mayonnaise covered the song for the second Eraserheads tribute album The Reunion: An Eraserheads Tribute Album, released in 2012.
- Former Rivermaya frontman Jason Fernandez covered the song for Wish 107.5 in 2018.
- Christian Bautista covered the song in 2019 with his wife Kat Ramnani.
