= Club Dredd =

Nightclub in the Philippines

Club Dredd (also known as Club Dredd Timog) is a night club that has been located in a number of locations in the Philippines. Since it opened in 1990, it has been influential in the Pinoy rock scene, and was considered a home by a number of bands that became the most popular recording acts in the Philippines in the 1990s.

Journalist Eric S. Caruncho included Club Dredd on his list of "movers and shakers in popular Filipino culture the past 32 years," published in 2017. His entry on Club Dredd read:

In the "alternative" rock era of the '90s, [Club Dredd on EDSA] (from its original site on Timog), Cubao, was the epicenter of the cultural revolt.

== History ==
The original Club Dredd was a nightclub located on Scout Tobias St., Quezon City, Philippines. The location had been a home for another rock venue called Red Rocks that had closed down. Club Dredd opened on 8 December 1990 and was founded by young rock musician Patrick Reidenbach and rock band manager Robbie Sunico. The club was named after their favorite comic book character, Judge Dredd. The two opened the club with a small amount of money.

The club owners' concept was to provide a venue for budding Filipino rock musicians and the growing followers of the Pinoy rock scene. Club Dredd was not to be a venue for bands covering pop music. Club Dredd bolstered the 1990s thrash metal and death metal scenes in the Philippines, which included bands such as Genital Grinder, Death After Birth, Disinterment, Kabaong ni Kamatayan, Loads of Motherhood, Skychurch, COG, Cheese, End of Man, Rumblebelly, Disinterment, Mass Carnage, and Apostate.

Some of the country's most popular bands played at Club Dredd Timog. Regular performers included Eraserheads, The Youth, Afterimage, Athena's Curse (later known as Alamid), Grace Nono, Joey Ayala, Bazurak (whose members eventually became part of Rivermaya), Color It Red, Parokya Ni Edgar, The Wuds, Razorback, Wolfgang, Half Life Half Death, and Advent Call.

Club Dredd was beset by financial problems from its inception. After struggling to sustain the business, Reidenbach and Sunico finally decided to close Club Dredd in February 1993. Major record labels and radio stations including NU 107 and LA 105 were finally recognizing the potential of the music scene's growing following.

In January 1994 Reidenbach opened the new and larger Club Dredd on E. de los Santos Avenue (EDSA), Cubao, Quezon City. With better planning and more professional management, this club flourished until mid-1998.

Club Dredd on EDSA continued to foster new talent. Among the bands who were discovered while playing here were The Teeth, Datu's Tribe, Put3Ska, Tribal Fish, Feet Like Fins, Sugar Hiccup, Greyhoundz, and Parokya ni Edgar.

On 11 June 1998, right after NU 107's Independence Day Concert which featured the most popular bands at the time, Club Dredd closed down once again.

The men behind Club Dredd put up a website in 1999 called Club Dredd online. Several small events were also organized as "Club Dredd presents." These quickly gained popularity, bringing many people to the small facility. "Club Dredd Presents" became a bi-weekly occurrence that gave the club a regular financial boost. The club currently hosts the event twice a month.

In December 2005, Club Dredd habitué Karen Kunawicz put up a month-long photo exhibit at Big Sky Mind called "Back From the Dredd," featuring photos and memorabilia from her years attending the venue. For the exhibit, Big Sky Mind repainted their second floor to resemble the defunct club.

In March 2006, Reidenbach and Sunico began hosting a Friday night radio show on NU 107 called radioDredd, along with DJ Skul (Erwin Romulo) and Professor Ramone (Ramon De Veyra). It featured an eclectic mix of new and old music, obscure and popular artists, local and foreign. It had a free-for-all format that often had the hosts openly arguing with each other on air and fighting over what songs to play. It ran for over a year until it was cancelled in April 2007. No official explanation was given, but it may have been due to a lack of sponsorship or to a raucous anniversary show that ran overtime and had many of the hosts and guests drunk and rowdy while on the air.

Club Dredd, the venue, reopened quietly in June 2007, on the second floor of Gweilos Bar in Eastwood City, Libis, Quezon City. It still featured many upcoming new acts and weird shows, introducing new acts such as Tanya Markova, Roots of Nature, and Hilera. In November 2010 Club Dredd Eastwood closed.

In 2013, Club Dredd was acquired by long-time music producer, artist manager and managing partner of Gweilos Bar and Restaurant, Roldan "Bong" Baluyot.

In March 2015, the new Club Dredd organized "Club Dredd Island Jam: featuring Big Mountain"—the first ever concert by the world-renowned reggae band Big Mountain. The event was held at Charlie's Steakhouse in Boracay.

On June 1, 2015, Club Dredd opened at The Avenue, along FP Felix Avenue (between Goldstar Garden Inn and Sta Lucia East Brickroad) in Cainta, Rizal, welcoming customers coming mostly from Rizal Province, Pasig City and Marikina.
