= With a Smile (song) =

- Promotional CD single cover (1999)

Single by Eraserheads

from the album Circus and Aloha Milkyway
- Released: November 4, 1994 (via Circus) May 1999
- Recorded: 1994
- Genre: Alternative rock; pop rock
- Length: 4:38
- Label: Musiko Records; BMG Records (Pilipinas) Inc.
- Songwriter: Ely Buendia
- Composer: Robin Rivera

Eraserheads singles chronology
"Tamagotchi Baby" (1999)	"With a Smile" (1994)	"Maselang Bahaghari" (1999)

Music video
- "With a Smile" on YouTube

"With a Smile" is a song by the Philippine alternative rock band Eraserheads from their second album Circus (1994). It was later released in May 1999 as a promotional single for their compilation album Aloha Milkyway, released in 1998 for the Southeast Asian market.

== Music videos ==
The first music video for "With a Smile" was released in 1995 and directed by Art Borromeo and Linette Buenaseda. It shows the band performing at Nayong Pilipino in Pasay City and their female fans. Also featured in the video are several members of all-women Pinoy rock band Keltscross, and Ely's younger sisters Lally and Elyra, who would later be acknowledged as the song "I Can't Remember You" from the 1997 EP Bananatype is based after a nursery rhyme they created.

The second music video was directed by Buendia and Mark Villena and commissioned for the song's single release in 1999. Inspired by Alice in Wonderland, it features a young girl (played by Ysabel Yuzon) wandering through a park and into a swimming pool, where she spends time with the band in a costumed attire.

== Cover versions ==
- Regine Velasquez covered the song for the soundtrack to the 2000 film Pangako... Ikaw Lang.
- South Border covered the song with Kelly Badon for the first Eraserheads tribute album Ultraelectromagneticjam!: The Music of the Eraserheads, released in 2005.
- Aiza Seguerra covered the song with Mike Villegas of Rizal Underground for the second Eraserheads tribute album The Reunion: An Eraserheads Tribute Album, released in 2012.
- Allen Sta. Maria performed the song during season one of the Philippine music competition show The X Factor Philippines in 2012.
- Daniel Padilla covered the song for his second album I Heart You, released in 2014.
- Noel Cabangon covered the song in his cover album Byahe Pa Rin, released in 2017.
- Janine Berdin performed the song for the Tawag ng Tanghalan singing competition as part of the Philippine noontime show It's Showtime in 2018.
- Reese Lansangan covered the song for the 2018 film Mama's Girl.
- During the COVID-19 pandemic, the song was used as a tribute to Philippine frontline workers, with 90s female OPM rock singers Melody del Mundo Lucas, Cynthia Alexander, Barbie Almalbis, Bayang Barrios, Aia de Leon, Kitchie Nadal, and more performing an online version of the song. Bea Lorenzo also covered the song in 2020 in collaboration with the Department of Tourism.
- Vachirawit Chivaaree covered the song in 2020 for the Tagalog dub of the second season of the Thai TV series 2gether: The Series, titled Still 2gether.
- Lovi Poe covered the song for the 2021 Philippine drama series Owe My Love for GMA Network.
- Shanne Dandan covered the song for the 2024 film Sunny, a Philippine remake of the South Korean film of the same name.

== Personnel ==
Eraserheads

- Ely Buendia - vocals, tambourine, acoustic guitar, guitar, writer, producer, remastering engineering
- Buddy Zabala - keyboards, bass, producer
- Marcus Adoro - guitar, producer
- Raimund Marasigan - drums, producer

Technical personnel

- Robin Rivera - producer
- Lito Palco - mixing, engineer
- Rudy Tee - executive producer
- Buddy Medina - executive producer
