= The Reunion: An Eraserheads Tribute Album =

Compilation album by Various Artists
- Released: March 15, 2012
- Recorded: 2012
- Genre: Alternative rock; indie rock; pop rock
- Length: 1:07:30
- Label: Star Records

The Reunion: An Eraserheads Tribute Album is the second tribute album to the Philippine alternative rock band Eraserheads. It was released on March 15, 2012 by Star Music as the official soundtrack to the Star Cinema film The Reunion. The album features covers of Eraserheads songs as performed by Filipino artists.

== Track listing ==
No.	Title	Artist	Length
1.	"Ligaya"	Mayonnaise	3:38
2.	"Maling Akala"	Itchyworms	4:13
3.	"With a Smile"	Aiza Seguerra feat. Mike Villegas	3:47
4.	"Minsan"	Callalily	5:04
5.	"Kaliwete"	Hilera	3:51
6.	"Pare Ko"	Johnoy Danao	4:48
7.	"Kailan"	Ney Dimaculangan and Yeng Constantino	4:03
8.	"Overdrive"	Vin Dancel	4:36
9.	"Magasin"	Chicosci	4:26
10.	"Hey, Jay"	Tanya Markova	4:46
11.	"Alapaap"	6cyclemind feat. Eunice of Gracenote	4:46
12.	"Superproxy"	Razorback feat. Gloc-9	5:43
13.	"Ang Huling El Bimbo"	Jay Durias	6:51
14.	"Fine Time"	Marc Abaya of Kjwan	6:31
Total length:			1:07:30
