= Alapaap =

Song by Eraserheads

from the album Circus
- Released: November 4, 1994
- Recorded: 1994
- Genre: Pinoy rock; psychedelic rock; grunge
- Length: 4:23
- Label: Musiko Records; BMG Records (Pilipinas) Inc.
- Songwriter: Ely Buendia
- Producer: Robin Rivera

"Alapaap" (lit. 'High Clouds') is a song by the Philippine alternative rock band Eraserheads from their second album Circus (1994).

== Music and lyrics ==
Along with other Philippine rock songs at the time such as "Iskolar ng Bayan" by Yano and "Laklak" by Teeth, "Alapaap" became a subject of controversy due to its suggestive lyrics, which Senator Tito Sotto saw as promoting drug use. Sotto, who was a member of the Citizens' Drug Watch, called for the song to be banned from radio in August 1995. The band responded with a letter to the senator stating that it was a misinterpretation and that the song was their "ode to freedom", not drug abuse. "That is freedom of expression," stated writer Ely Buendia. "Gusto ko lang kumawala sa problema sa mundo, gusto ko lang lumaya (I just wanted to get out of the world's problems, I wanted to be free)." They also personally met with the senator, vowing to join the Junior DrugWatch for an anti-drug campaign.

In a 2012 Esquire article, Buendia confirmed that the song did allude to drug use but at the same time maintained that it can also be interpreted otherwise. He also acknowledged its similarity to the Pale Fountains song "Reach".

The opening melody of the song was later sampled by Francis M. for his song "Whole Lotta Lovin'" from the 1998 album The Oddventures of Mr. Cool.

== Covers ==
- 6cyclemind covered the song twice: with then-vocalist Ney Dimaculangan for the first Eraserheads tribute album Ultraelectromagneticjam!: The Music of the Eraserheads, released in 2005; and with vocalist Tutti Caringal and Eunice Jorge of Gracenote on guest vocals for the second Eraserheads tribute album The Reunion: An Eraserheads Tribute Album, released in 2012.
- Yeng Constantino & Harana covered the song for the 2017 film Dear Other Self.
- Leanne and Naara covered the song in 2019 as part of the third Eraserheads tribute album Pop Machine the Album.
- Dilaw covered the song for the 2023 film Firefly.

=== In popular culture ===
In 2008, comedian Michael V. and a few cast members from the Philippine late night show Bubble Gang (known as the "Eraseyourheads") made a parody cover of the song entitled "Hala Pack Up" (English: Oh No, Pack Up). The song's lyrics tell the story of a fan who goes to a concert of a famous band only to be disappointment when the concert had to be cut short, referencing the band's first reunion concert that year.

== Live performances ==
The band opened their first reunion concert in 2008 with “Alapaap”.
