= Bomba (genre) =

1960s Filipino film genre

Bomba was a Filipino film genre, characterized by its gratuitous use of sex scenes. It was most popular in the late 1960s, and was a focal point of cultural debates around sex and sexuality.

== History ==
Bomba emerged as a genre of film in the Philippines in the late 1960s. Bomba films featured nudity, albeit not full-frontal nudity, as well as simulated sex scenes that were often tangential to the plot. Films in the genre include a mix of soft-core and hard-core pornography, with new bomba films becoming more sexually explicit over time. Despite their sexual content, bomba films were a mainstream phenomenon in the Philippines, and actresses associated with the genre, referred to as "bomba stars", appeared frequently in mainstream media.

== Analysis ==
Bomba played a role in revitalizing Filipino film at the end of the 1960s as one of the few local film genres that could draw audiences away from imported American films. Beyond the commercial success of the films themselves, the provocative nature of the films' sexual content became a subject of extensive cultural debate. Bomba films remain one of the only categories of 1960s Filipino film to have drawn extensive critical attention.

== See also ==
- Pornochanchada
- Sex in film
- Censorship in the Philippines
