= Brownman Revival =

Filipino reggae band

- (L-R) Mark Jay-R Ibañez, RJ Alzol, Jr., Nazareth Vicencio, Dennis Concepcion, Rankin Hiyas, Nigel Ian Laxamana, Nhoel Austria, Leal Nanca, Hiroki Ambo

Background information
- Origin: Manila, Philippines
- Genre: Reggae
- Works: Discography
- Years active: 1994-Present
- Labels: Spectrum Music, Sony Music, Curve Entertainment, BMR Music
- Members: Dennis Concepcion (drums and backing vocals), Nhoel Austria (lead guitars and backing vocals), Hiroki Ambo (bass), Rankin Hiyas (rhythm guitar and lead vocals), Leal Naca (keyboards and backing vocals), Mark Jay-R Ibañez (trumpet), RJ Alzol, Jr. (saxophone), Nazareth Vicencio (trombone), Nigel Ian Laxamana (keyboards, synthesizers, and programming)

Brownman Revival is a Filipino reggae band formed in Manila, Philippines, on November 1994. The group is recognized for combining reggae and rocksteady rhythms with Filipino folk-pop, particularly through reggae reinterpretations of established Filipino songs alongside original material. The band became one of the most recognizable acts associated with the rise of mainstream Pinoy reggae in the 2000s.

Brownman Revival lists Mountain, Aswad, Inner Circle, and UB40 among their musical influences as well as Filipino reggae group Tropical Depression and OPM acts such as Eraserheads, Apo Hiking Society, and VST & Company. Its music has been characterized by its incorporation of reggae rhythms into familiar Filipino melodic and lyrical traditions.

The band's breakthrough came with its major-label debut album Steady Lang in 2005. The album introduced Brownman Revival to a wider national audience through its reggae adaptation of the Eraserheads song "Maling Akala", as well as reggae versions of "Binibini" by the Rainmakers and "Ikaw Lang ang Aking Mahal" by VST & Company. The success of the album established the band's distinctive approach of bringing established OPM material into a reggae setting while maintaining a strong Filipino identity.

The group subsequently released Ayos Din in 2007, followed by the EP Eto Pa! in 2010 and New Arrival in 2015. Its catalog includes both original compositions and reinterpretations of songs from different generations of Filipino popular music. Brownman Revival also recorded "Sorry Na, Pwede Ba?" with Filipino singer and entertainer Rico J. Puno, a collaboration that received an Awit Awards nomination.

Brownman Revival remains active as a live performing group. The band celebrated its 30th year in the Philippine music industry in 2025, receiving renewed national television exposure and continuing to perform at major concerts and festivals.

In 2026, Brownman Revival was featured as the principal live musical act for Día del Libro, the annual cultural celebration organized by Instituto Cervantes de Manila, performing at Ayala Triangle Gardens in Makati. The institution described the group as a legendary Filipino reggae band whose music combines reggae with traditional Filipino folk-pop rhythms.

== History ==
=== Formation and Early Years ===
Brownman Revival was formed in November 1994 in Manila by drummer Dennis Concepcion. The band began as an independent group at a time when reggae remained largely associated with niche and alternative music scenes in the Philippines.

From its early years, the group developed a large-ensemble format and a sound that combined reggae's characteristic rhythmic foundation with Filipino melodic sensibilities. Rather than treating reggae as a foreign musical template, Brownman Revival developed an approach that incorporated familiar OPM melodies, Filipino lyrics and local pop structures into the genre.

By the early 2000s, the group had established itself as a regular live act and had developed a following before entering the mainstream recording industry.

=== "Steady Lang" and Mainstream Breakthrough ===
Brownman Revival's first major-label release was Steady Lang, released in 2005 under Sony Music. The album marked the band's transition from an independent live act into a nationally recognized recording artist.

Its most prominent single was "Maling Akala," a reggae reinterpretation of a song originally recorded by the Eraserheads. The track was included in the 2005 compilation album Ultraelectromagnetic Jam, a tribute album featuring contemporary Filipino artists performing songs associated with the Eraserheads. Brownman Revival's version became one of the compilation's most recognizable recordings.

Steady Lang also included reggae adaptations of "Binibini" by the Rainmakers and "Ikaw Lang ang Aking Mahal" by VST & Company, alongside original Brownman Revival compositions including "Lintik," "Ikaw Forever," "Under the Reggae Moon," "Dahan-Dahan," "Gusto Mo Pa," "Ngayong Gabi," "Salarin," and "Jeggae."

Contemporary music writers noted that Brownman Revival's success demonstrated how reggae could be integrated into mainstream Filipino popular music. Their music was described as a meeting point between reggae and OPM, with the band's arrangements giving familiar songs a distinctly different rhythmic identity.

=== Ayos Din and Wider Mainstream Recognition ===
Brownman Revival followed Steady Lang with Ayos Din in 2007. The album expanded the group's original repertoire while retaining its reggae-based interpretation of Filipino popular music.

Songs from the album included "Muli," "Paniwalaan," "Kapit," "Walang Kasing Sarap," "Reggae Fever," "Bitin," "Diskarte," "Ikembot," "Lasapin," "Yakap Sa Dilim," and "Sorry Na, Pwede Ba?"

The album also contained "Sorry Na, Pwede Ba?" featuring Rico J. Puno, bringing Brownman Revival together with one of the most recognizable figures in Philippine popular music. Members later described the recording session with Puno as particularly memorable, recalling that the collaboration was completed quickly and with little formal preparation.

The collaboration subsequently earned the group an Awit Awards nomination for Best World/Alternative/Bossa Music Recording in 2008. The band's "Reggae Fever" was also nominated for Best Dance Recording.

==== Eto Pa! and original material ====
In 2010, Brownman Revival released Eto Pa!, a six-track EP under Sony Music. Unlike the band's earlier breakthrough, which had prominently featured reinterpretations of established OPM songs, Eto Pa! consisted entirely of original Pinoy reggae material.

The EP included "Hitik Sa Bunga," "Pinakamagandang Tanawin," "Nagugustuhan," "Giling Giliw," "Dub Mo Giliw," and "Nagugusto Dub."

The lead single, "Hitik Sa Bunga," used the metaphor of fruit being attacked because it was abundant or successful to address the Filipino concept of crab mentality. Its music video received exposure on MYX, while the group was selected by Channel [V] Philippines as its Very Important Pinoy (VIP) of the Month.

==== Continued recording and independent releases ====
Brownman Revival continued releasing music after its Sony Music period, including the EP New Arrival in 2015. The release contained the tracks "Mabuting Balita," "Lagay Ng Panahon," "Sa Ngiti Mo," and "Natatakam."

The band subsequently released singles including "Nandito" in 2018, "Sa Pumipili" in 2019 and "Sulit" in 2021. These releases demonstrated the band's continued songwriting and recording activity beyond its commercially successful 2000s period.

== Longetivity and Recent Activity ==
Brownman Revival's longevity became a defining feature of its identity. In 2018, GMA Network featured the band as the concluding artist of its Playlist Music Month, where the group performed live and discussed its continuing advocacy for original Filipino music and Pinoy reggae.

Drummer and founding member Dennis Concepcion described the group as music fans first and emphasized the importance of supporting new ideas and new Filipino music rather than simply reproducing existing sounds.

In 2019, The Philippine Star marked the band's 25th year, describing its uninterrupted presence in the local music scene as an unusual achievement. The group reflected on its long career, changes in membership and commitment to continuing to perform reggae music for future generations.

Brownman Revival reached its 30th anniversary in 2024, subsequently receiving national television coverage in 2025 through ASAP, where the band looked back on three decades in the Philippine music industry.

The anniversary period also reinforced the group's position within the broader OPM concert circuit. Brownman Revival performed alongside major contemporary and established Filipino acts at events including Circus Music Festival 5 in 2024, and continued appearing in major commercial and cultural events.

The band also appeared at Tigtigan Terakan Keng Dalan 2024 in Angeles City, one of Central Luzon's largest street festivals, where it performed alongside acts including The Dawn, Mayonnaise and Dilaw. The event drew approximately 50,000 attendees.

In December 2024, Brownman Revival performed at Sinadya Festival in Roxas City alongside Unique Salonga.

Brownman Revival remaines active on the live circuit including regular performances at 12 Monkeys Music Hall & Pub in Pasig, the 70's Bistro in Quezon City and appearances on major concert lineups.

The group also appeared at a 2025 TV5 event alongside artists including Kuh Ledesma and Eliza Maturan.

In April 2026, Brownman Revival headlined the closing concert of Día del Libro 2026, presented by Instituto Cervantes de Manila at Ayala Triangle Gardens. The cultural institution identified the band as a legendary Filipino reggae group and highlighted its synthesis of reggae, Filipino folk-pop rhythms and socially conscious lyrics.

This continued activity places Brownman Revival among the Philippine bands whose careers have extended across multiple generations of OPM listeners rather than being confined to their initial commercial breakthrough.

== Musical style and influences ==
Brownman Revival's musical identity is based on reggae, particularly its more melodic and accessible forms, while incorporating elements of Filipino pop, folk-pop and rocksteady.

The band's early recordings drew from international reggae artists including Bob Marley, Big Mountain, Aswad, Inner Circle and UB40. Its Filipino influences include Tropical Depression, Eraserheads, Apo Hiking Society and VST & Company.

A defining characteristic of Brownman Revival's catalog is its reinterpretation of established Filipino songs. Rather than reproducing the originals, the band transforms them through reggae arrangements, emphasizing offbeat guitar rhythms, bass-driven grooves and a more relaxed rhythmic feel.

This approach was particularly evident in "Maling Akala," "Binibini," "Ikaw Lang ang Aking Mahal," and "Yakap Sa Dilim." The group's original compositions likewise frequently use conversational Filipino lyrics, romantic themes, humor and social observation.

The band has consequently been associated with a distinctly Pinoy reggae identity: reggae performed through Filipino language, cultural references and OPM traditions.

== Legacy and Cultural Significance ==
Brownman Revival is regarded as one of the enduring Filipino bands associated with the mainstream development of Pinoy reggae. Brownman Revival's career represents a particular strand of Philippine musical globalization: a foreign-origin genre becoming localized through Filipino language, songwriting and performance practice.

Its importance to Philippine popular music lies not only in the commercial success of songs such as "Maling Akala," "Lintik," "Binibini," "Ikaw Lang ang Aking Mahal," "Hitik Sa Bunga," and "Sorry Na, Pwede Ba?", but also in its role in demonstrating that reggae could function as a vehicle for Filipino songwriting and OPM reinterpretation.

Rather than presenting reggae strictly as Jamaican music transplanted into the Philippines, Brownman Revival helped establish a version of the genre that could coexist with mainstream OPM. Their most recognizable recordings frequently begin with songs already embedded in Filipino popular culture and then transform them through reggae rhythm and instrumentation.

The group's work helped introduce reggae arrangements to listeners who may have encountered the genre through familiar Filipino songs rather than through Jamaican or international reggae recordings. Contemporary coverage has repeatedly highlighted the band's ability to make reggae accessible to mainstream Filipino audiences.

Brownman Revival has also maintained an unusually long presence in the country's live music ecosystem. From its independent beginnings in 1994 through its major-label period, subsequent independent releases, festival appearances, television performances and cultural events , the band has continued to perform for successive generations of OPM audiences.

Their longevity has also made them a bridge between different eras of OPM. The band's catalog connects songs from the 1970s and 1980s with the alternative-rock generation of the 1990s and the contemporary Filipino festival and concert circuit of the 2020s.

More than three decades after its formation, Brownman Revival continues to perform, record and appear at national concerts, festivals and cultural programs, maintaining its place within the Philippine live-music landscape.

== Members ==
Brownman Revival has operated as a large ensemble throughout much of its history, with membership changing across different periods. It has historically operated with a flexible ensemble rather than a permanently fixed lineup. The band has publicly described this as part of its evolution, with musicians free to pursue other chapters of their careers while new musicians join the group.

Current members

- Dennis "Dencio" Concepcion – drums, vocals (1994–present)
- Nhoel Dizon Austria – lead guitar, vocals (2016–present)
- Rankin Hiyas — lead vocals and rhythm guitar
- Hiroki Ambo — bass
- Leal Nanca — keyboards
- Nigel Ian Laxamana — keyboards, synthesizers, and programming
- RJ Alzol, Jr —Saxophone
- Mark Jay-R Ibañez — Trumpet
- Nazareth Vicencio — trombone

== Discography ==
=== Studio albums and EPs ===
| Album | Tracks | Year | Records |
|---|---|---|---|
| Coming Soon EP | 1. "Under the Reggae Moon"; 2. "Fantasi"; 3. "Ngayong Gabi"; 4. "Goodbye Baby, Goodnight"; 5. "Paikot-Ikot"; 6. "Lintik" | 2003 | Spectrum Music |
| Steady Lang | 1. "Maling Akala"; 2. "Lintik"; 3. "Binibini"; 4. "Ikaw Forever"; 5. "Ikaw Ang Aking Mahal"; 6. "Under the Reggae Moon"; 7. "Dahan-Dahan"; 8. "Gusto Mo Pa"; 9. "Ngayong Gabi"; 10. "Salarin"; 11. "Jeggae" | 2005 | Sony Music |
| Ayos Din | 1. "Muli"; 2. "Paniwalaan"; 3. "Kapit"; 4. "Walang Kasing Sarap"; 5. "Sorry Na, Pwede Ba?" (Dino Version); 6. "Lahat ng Araw (Silayan)"; 7. "Paikot-Ikot"; 8. "Reggae Fever"; 9. "Bitin"; 10. "Diskarte"; 11. "Ikembot"; 12. "Lasapin"; 13. "Yakap Sa Dilim"; 14. "Sorry Na, Pwede Ba?" (featuring Rico J. Puno) | 2007 | Sony Music |
| Eto Pa! EP | 1. "Hitik sa Bunga"; 2. "Pinakamagandang Tanawin"; 3. "Nagugustuhan"; 4. "Giling Giliw"; 5. "Dub Mo Giliw"; 6. "Nagugusto Dub" | 2010 | Sony Music |
| New Arrival EP | 1. "Mabuting Balita"; 2. "Lagay Ng Panahon"; 3. "Sa Ngiti Mo"; 4. "Natatakam" | 2015 | BMR Music |

=== Compilation albums ===
- Ultraelectromagnetic Jam – "Maling Akala" (Sony BMG Music Philippines, 2005)

== Awards and nominations ==
| Year | Award giving body | Category | Nominated work | Results |
|---|---|---|---|---|
| 2005 | NU Rock Awards | Best New Artist | —N/a | Nominated |
| 2005 | NU Rock Awards | Rising Sun Award | —N/a | Nominated |
| 2006 | MYX Music Awards | Favorite Remake | "Maling Akala" | Nominated |
| 2006 | MYX Music Awards | Favorite New Artist | —N/a | Nominated |
| 2006 | MYX Music Awards | Favorite MYX Live Performance | —N/a | Nominated |
| 2008 | Awit Awards | Best World/Alternative/Bossa Music Recording | "Sorry na, Pwede Ba?" with Rico J. Puno | Nominated |
| 2008 | Awit Awards | Best Dance Recording | "Reggae Fever" | Nominated |

=== Collaborations and notable recordings ===
Brownman Revival has collaborated with or recorded material associated with several prominent Filipino artists and musical institutions.

Among the group's most notable collaborations is Rico J. Puno, who appeared on "Sorry Na, Pwede Ba?" from Ayos Din. The recording brought together Brownman Revival's reggae approach with Puno's distinctive vocal style and became an Awit Awards nominee.

The band's reinterpretation of "Maling Akala", originally by the Eraserheads, became part of Ultraelectromagnetic Jam, a 2005 compilation dedicated to reinterpretations of Eraserheads songs.

Its repertoire has also included reggae adaptations of songs associated with VST & Company, the Rainmakers, APO Hiking Society and other important figures in Philippine popular music.

Former members

- Januarie Sundiang – percussion, vocals
- Randy "Ranz" Mercader – keyboards, vocals
- Benjamin Perez – lead vocals
- Ian Sumagui – alto saxophone
- PJ Aguilar – tenor saxophone
- Dawn Cepeda – bass
- Pawlo Mendoza – trumpet
- Alexander "Ambet" Abundo – trumpet
- Onard Bonavente – keyboards, vocals
- Jayson Cuevas – trombone
- Alphy Desaville – lead guitar, vocals
- Dino Concepcion – lead vocals
- Jao Larion – bass
- Kenneth Gonzales – keyboards
- Andrew Santos – saxophone
- Jojo Antinero – saxophone
