= Oh, Flamingo! =

Filipino indie rock band

- Origin: Manila, Philippines
- Genres: Indie rock; alternative rock
- Years active: 2013–present
- Labels: Wide Eyed Records Manila; Sony Music Philippines
- Members: Howard Luistro; Pappu de Leon; Billie Dela Paz; Pat Sarabia
- Past members: Fries Bersales

Oh, Flamingo! is a Filipino indie rock band from Manila, formed in 2013. The band consists of Howard Luistro (vocals, guitar), Billie Dela Paz (vocals, bass), Pappu de Leon (guitar), and Pat Sarabia (drums).

The band released their debut self-titled EP in November 2015. They were the winners of Wanderland's pre-event band competition Wanderband in 2015, and performed at Wanderland Festival in 2016. They released their sophomore EP, Volumes, in 2020.

Originally signed under indie label Wide Eyed Records Manila, the band is currently signed under Sony Music Philippines, a division of Sony Music.

== Members ==
=== Current Members ===
- Howard Luistro - vocals, guitar (2013-present)
- Billie Dela Paz - vocals, bass (2013-present)
- Pappu de Leon - guitar (2013-present)
- Pat Sarabia - drums (2017–present)

=== Past Members ===
- Fries Bersales - drums (2013-2017)

== Discography ==
=== Studio albums ===
- Pagtanda (2023)

=== EPs ===
- Oh, Flamingo! (2015)
- Volumes (2020)

=== Singles ===
- "June" (2015)
- "Reflections" (2015)
- "Two Feet" (2016)
- "Inconsistencies" (2016)
- "Bottom of This" (2018)
- "Four Corners" (2019)
- "Parara" (2019)
- "Naubos Na" (2020)
- "Sunsets" (2020)
- "Echoes/Psychedelic Sweater" (2020)
- "Pag-Ibig Lang Ba" (2021)
- "Galit" (2021)
- "Sigurado" (2021)
- "Anino" (2022)
- "Salawahan" (2022)
- "Tumatakbong Oras" (2022)

=== Music videos ===
Year	Song	Director
2015	"June"	Oh, Flamingo!
2016	"Two Feet"	Jedd Dumaguina
2016	"Inconsistencies"	Kit de Silva
2018	"Bottom of This"	Paolo Abrihan
2019	"Four Corners"	Norvin de Los Santos
2020	"Naubos Na"	Kyle Quismundo
2020	"Sunsets"	Apol Sta. Maria
2020	"Echoes/Psychedelic Sweater"	Norvin de los Santos
2021	"Pag-Ibig Lang Ba"	Pat Sarabia and Susan Larsson
