= Eraserheads =

Philippine rock band

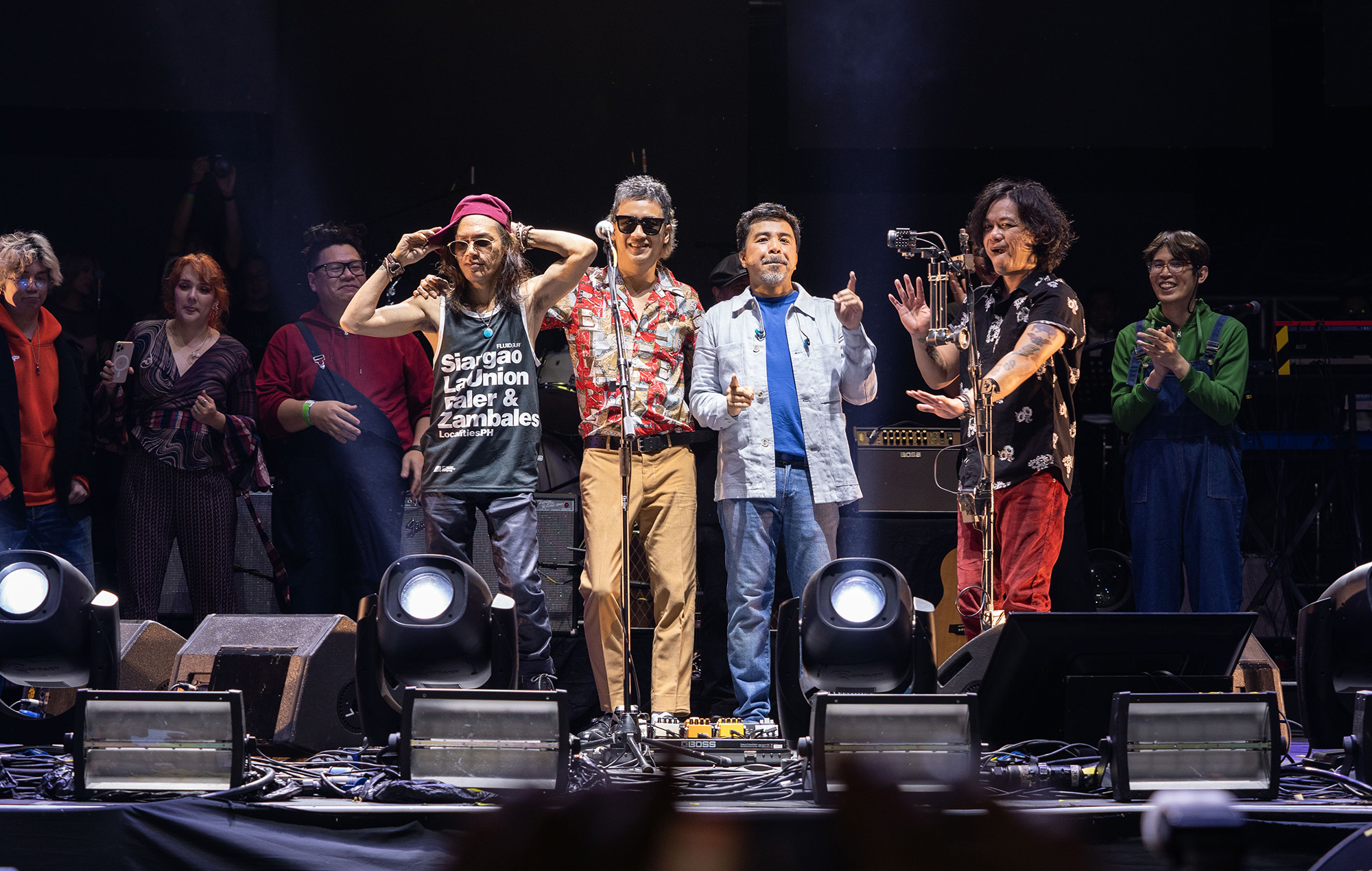
- Eraserheads during the Huling El Bimbo reunion concert in 2022. From left: Marcus Adoro, Ely Buendia, Buddy Zabala, and Raimund Marasigan

Background information
- Origin: Quezon City, Philippines
- Genres: Alternative rock; pop; Pinoy rock; experimental
- Works: Eraserheads discography
- Years active: 1989–2002; 2008–2009; 2012–2014; 2016; 2022–present
- Labels: Musiko; Greater East Asia; Sony Music Philippines; Offshore Music
- Spinoffs: Sandwich; Cambio; The Mongols; Pupil; Pedicab; The Oktaves; Apartel
- Members: Ely Buendia; Buddy Zabala; Marcus Adoro; Raimund Marasigan
- Website: www.eraserheads.ph

Eraserheads (sometimes stylized as ƎRASERHEADS or ƎRASƎRHƎADS, often shortened as E-Heads) are a Philippine rock band formed in Quezon City in 1989. The group consists of lead singer Ely Buendia, guitarist Marcus Adoro, bassist Buddy Zabala, and drummer Raimund Marasigan. Hailed as "the Beatles of the Philippines", they are regarded as one of the most influential and successful bands in the country.

Eraserheads released their debut album, Ultraelectromagneticpop!, in 1993, to critical acclaim and strong sales. Followed by Circus (1994) and Cutterpillow (1995), the band ushered in a second wave of Philippine rock bands in the 1990s. They also received MTV Asia’s Viewers Choice Award at the 1997 MTV Video Music Awards in New York City, the only Philippine artist to have received the award before the conception of the MTV Asia Awards.

After releasing the Christmas concept album Fruitcake (1996), Eraserheads experimented with electronic and art rock styles for their next albums Sticker Happy (1997), Natin99 (1999), and Carbon Stereoxide (2001). The band broke up in 2002, and all principal former members have since had successful solo careers. They reunited in 2008 for a series of reunion concerts in the Philippines and have since made sporadic touring and promotional appearances in the country and overseas.

== History ==
=== 1989–1992: Formation and early years ===
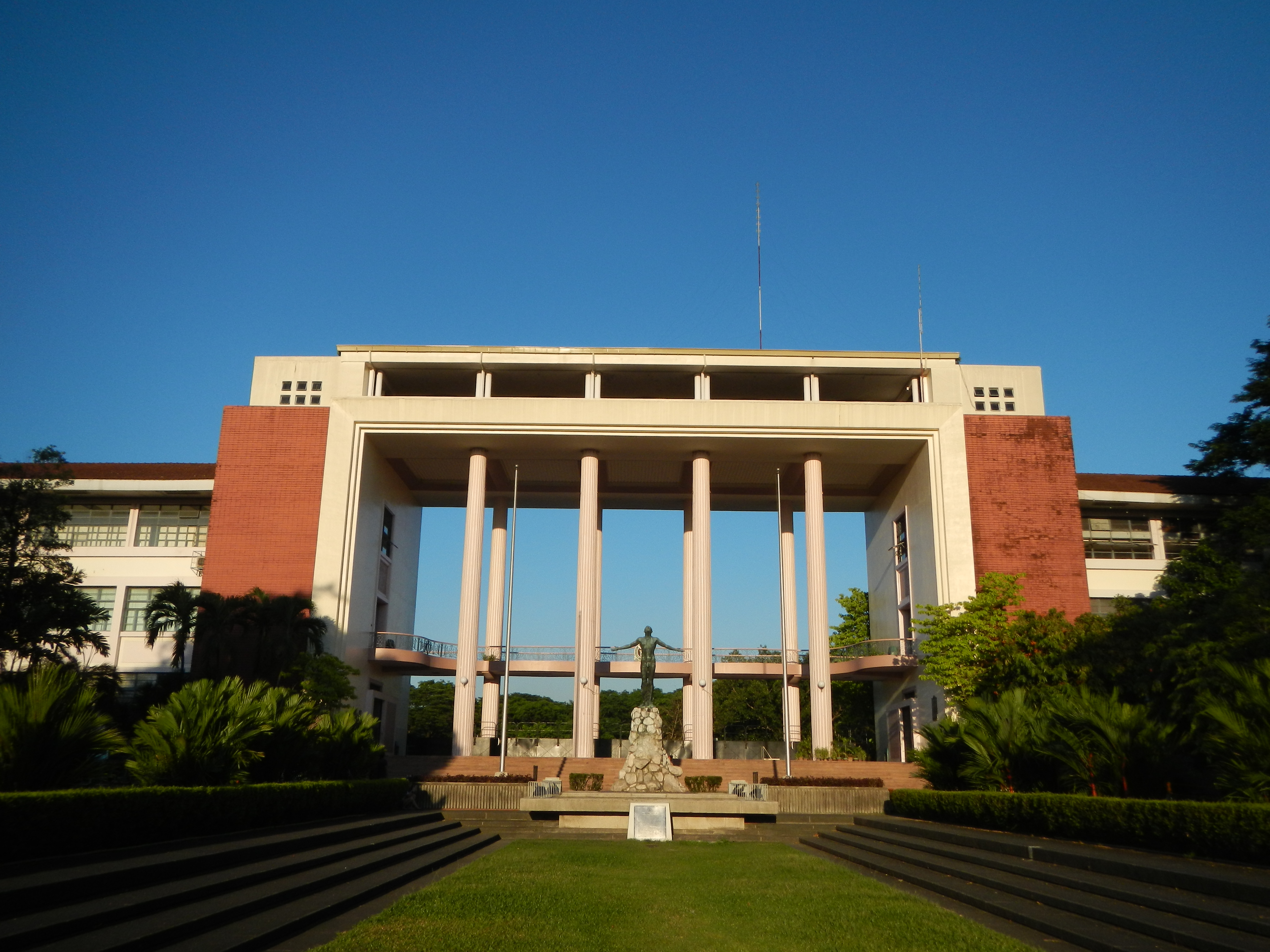
U.P. Diliman where all members of the band attended.

The members of Eraserheads met while attending University of the Philippines Diliman in Quezon City in 1989. Vocalist Ely Buendia previously had two college bands, Bluidie Tryste and Sunday School, and was a year above drummer Raimund Marasigan (also a session drummer for Sunday School), bassist Buddy Zabala, and guitarist Marcus Adoro; the three were part of another college band named Curfew. Ely posted an audition notice for a new band on a university message board, of which only Raimund, Buddy, and Marcus showed up. The new band called themselves Eraserheads after the David Lynch film Eraserhead (1977).

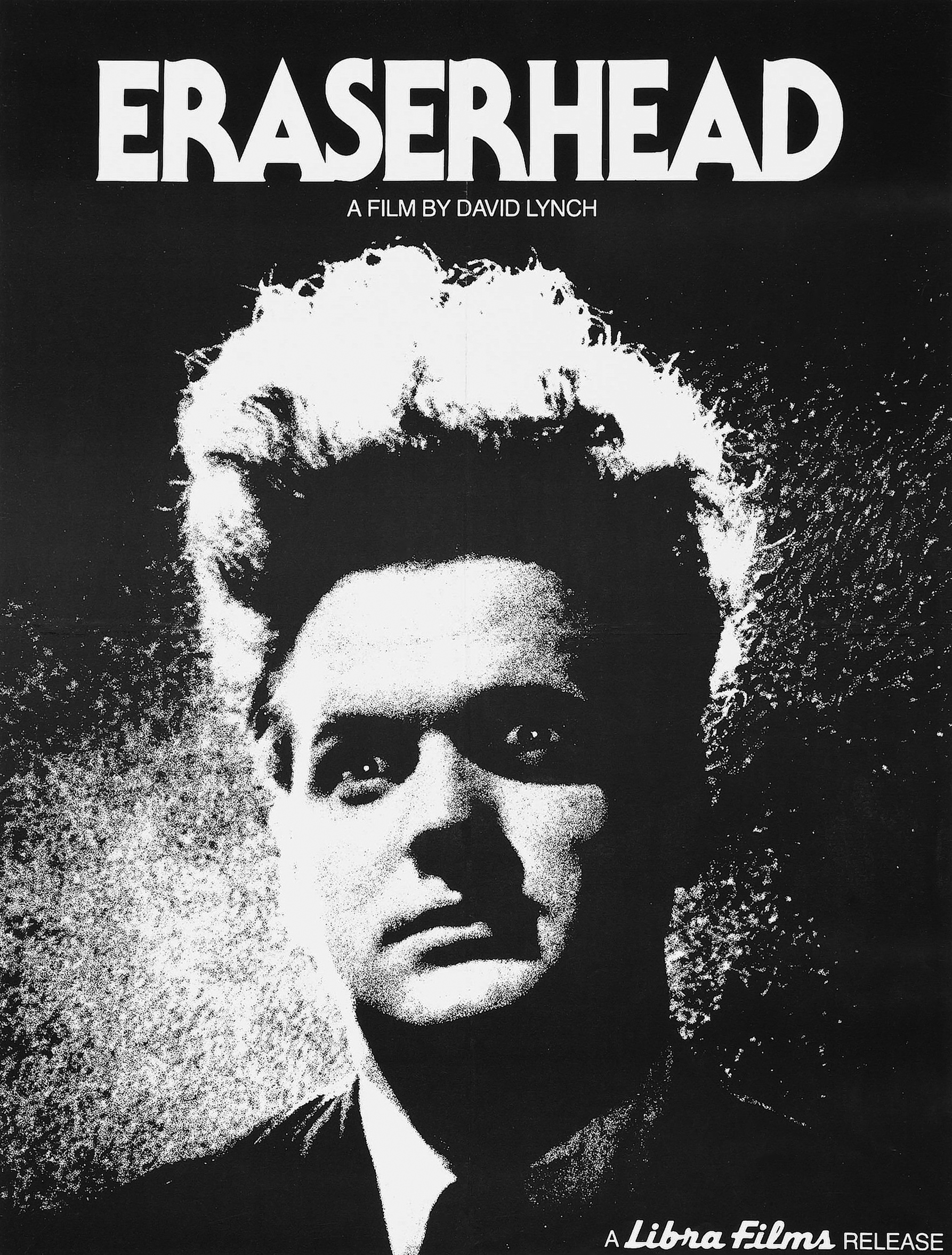
Film poster of David Lynch's Eraserhead (1977)

The band played at campus events, usually as the crowd started to leave. They initially had little success playing covers, and they decided to write their own material which soon earned them a cult following. One song, "Pare Ko", became popular for its explicit lyrics. They later met Jett Pangan of The Dawn at a sorority event, who advised them to audition. On January 26, 1991, the band recorded a nine-song demo tape at Marasigan's garage in Candelaria, Quezon, including "Pare Ko", "Milk And Money" and "Shake Yer Head", which were later re-recorded for future albums. The demos were influenced by The Cure as well as ska and reggae genres. The band shopped the demo tape around record labels, clubs, and radio stations only to be met with rejection; one record label commented that the demos were “not pop enough”. Marasigan gave a copy of the demo tape to his humanities professor Robin Rivera, who helped them re-record and mix better versions of the demos at the university's Faculty Center building (since destroyed by a fire in 2016) from March 26-27, 1991. The new demo tape was named Pop-U! as an irreverent response to those who turned them down. Pop-U! also included early versions of "Tindahan Ni Aling Nena", "Wishing Wells", and "Scorpio Rising", which were later re-recorded for future albums. Pop-U! earned the band a spot at Club Dredd, where "Pare Ko" in particular was a hit. The band soon landed an out-of-town gig opening for Introvoys in Cebu.

Meanwhile, Buendia worked as a copywriter for BMG and wrote songs with the band at night. Their material later caught the attention of BMG A&R director Vic Valenciano, who commented that they were technically very raw but that there was something promising in them. In 1992, BMG signed the band into a three-year record deal.

=== 1993–1996: Mainstream success ===
Eraserheads recorded their debut album, Ultraelectromagneticpop!, in early 1993, with some of the tracks rerecorded from Pop-U! First released by BMG in July, the album became a commercial success, selling 300,000 copies by the end of the year. “Pare Ko” became controversial for its explicit lyrics, with the Philippine Association of the Record Industry (PARI) unsuccessfully attempting to censor it. As a result, the album featured both the original and censored versions, with the latter titled “Walang Hiyang Pare Ko” (later excluded from the album's 25th anniversary remaster).

The band performed at the 43rd Miss Universe pageant held at the Philippine International Convention Center in Pasay City in May 1994. Later in November, they held their first major concert titled "Eraserheads Jamboree" at the Folk Arts Theater (now the Tanghalang Francisco Balagtas) in Malate, Manila. They also released their second album Circus in the same month. It also became a commercial success, eventually turning quintuple platinum. Some of its tracks became classic hits for the band, such as "Kailan", "Minsan", "Magasin", "Alapaap" and "With a Smile". "Alapaap" became controversial for its suggestive lyrics, which Senator Tito Sotto interpreted as promoting drug use. The band denied the allegation, stating that it was a misinterpretation and that the song was the band's "ode to freedom", not drug abuse.

In July 1995, the band starred as themselves opposite Joey de Leon in the comedy film Run Barbi Run, also contributing to its theme song. Later in December, the band launched their third studio album Cutterpillow through a free open-air concert. It became their fastest-selling record, earning double platinum after one week with 80,000 copies. The album featured classic hits such as "Overdrive", "Huwag Mo Nang Itanong", "Torpedo" and "Ang Huling El Bimbo", of which a music video directed by Auraeus Solito premiered in February 1996. After the release of Cutterpillow, the band went on a nationwide tour to promote the album.

In January 1996, the band opened for Sonic Youth, Foo Fighters and Beastie Boys for MTV Asia's Alternative Nation tour in Manila. Later in December, they released their fourth studio album Fruitcake, a Christmas concept album with all songs written in English. Like their previous albums, it became a commercial success, earning triple platinum after a month with 120,000 copies sold. It was followed by a companion storybook released the following year.

=== 1997–2002: Later years and break-up ===
==== Going international ====
The band started touring outside the Philippines in 1997, first performing at BMG Records' Sentosa Pop Festival in Singapore in March. They made their American debut in May, playing several venues in California. In September, they received the MTV Asia's Viewer's Choice Award for the "Ang Huling El Bimbo" video at the MTV Video Music Awards at Radio City Music Hall in New York City, making them the first Philippine artist to receive such a distinction.

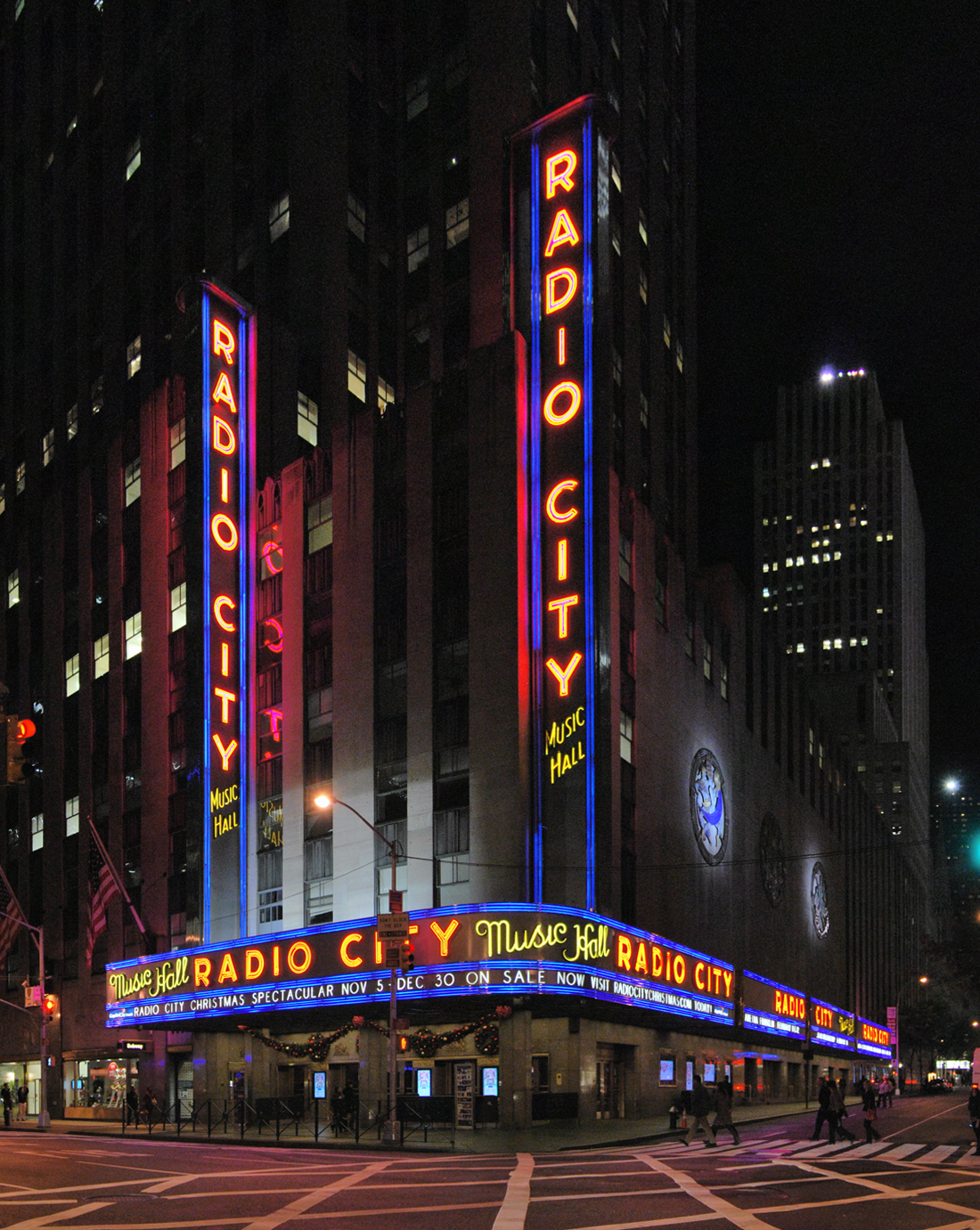
Radio City Music Hall in New York City

The band released their fifth studio album Sticker Happy in the same month. It also became a commercial success, selling 120,000 copies. The album saw the band experimenting with techno and experimental rock genres, incorporating a wide range of instruments and guitar effects, with Buendia writing cryptic lyrics in songs such as “Kaliwete”, “Spoliarium”, and “Para sa Masa”.

In February 1998, the band represented the Philippines at the Asia Live Dream '98 for NHK in Tokyo, Japan. They later toured the US to promote Sticker Happy under the Happy Box production outfit. In August, the band released the compilation album Aloha Milkyway for the Southeast Asian market, featuring five new songs including "Julie Tearjerky" and "Tamagotchi Baby" as well as select English language tracks from their previous albums. They later toured in Singapore in September and in Australia in April 1999 to promote the record.

The band released their sixth studio album, Natin99, in May 1999. Recorded in a nonlinear approach, the album featured significant contributions from members other than Buendia, who wrote the promotional singles "Maselang Bahaghari" and "Huwag Kang Matakot". In November, the band performed at Dubai, United Arab Emirates with rapper Francis M.

In January 2000, the band performed with APO Hiking Society at Nescafé's Open Up Party at Bonifacio Global City. They later toured the US between May and June 2000, playing venues in New York, Chicago, and California. The band released their seventh and final studio album Carbon Stereoxide in March 2001.

==== Buendia's departure, new vocalist and break-up ====
Buendia left Eraserheads in March 2002. In an interview, Adoro revealed that Buendia sent a cryptic text message to his band members that “it’s graduation time”, referring to him being a year ahead of them at UP. Buendia later recalled in a podcast interview in 2021: “We had a very, very good working relationship. It’s just that I don’t like it when people say that it was the wrong way to go, ‘yung dynamics within the band.”

The remaining three members later debuted with new vocalist, Kris Gorra-Dancel of Fatal Posporos, at Hard Rock Manila in April. Naming themselves “EHeads”, they released a promotional EP titled Please Transpose in August which featured the single “U Make Me”, of which a music video was directed by Marie Jamora. Adoro left the band in November, and the rest of the band recruited Ebe Dancel of Sugarfree and Diego Mapa of Monsterbot and renamed the band Cambio, ending the Eraserheads.

=== 2003–2007: After the break-up ===
The band received the Hall of Fame award at the NU Rock Awards X in November 2003. Buendia, who also performed at the awards show with his band the Mongols, accepted the award. In May 2004, Adoro (as Surfernando) jammed with Zabala and Marasigan at the Millennia Club in UP.

In 2005, the first Eraserheads tribute album Ultraelectromagneticjam!: The Music of the Eraserheads was released. “I don’t have a problem with that,” Buendia reacted to the release. “I just feel it’s not yet the right time to do such tribute because I’m still doing something worthwhile.” He appears in the album through Francis M.’s re-recording of “Superproxy” titled “Superproxy 2K6”.

In February 2007, the essay anthology book, Tikman ang Langit: An Anthology on the Eraserheads, was launched at Makati with acoustic performances from Cambio and Adoro's band Markus Highway, marking the first time members of the Eraserheads performed together since their break-up. Buendia was not able to attend due to a meeting with his heart surgeon. In July 2007, the band were listed as performers with Teeth, Rivermaya, and Parokya ni Edgar for a live show at the Saguijo Bar in Makati. However, Buendia and Adoro did not show up as they had separate engagements.

=== 2008–present: Reunions ===
==== 2008–2009: The Reunion Concert and The Final Set ====
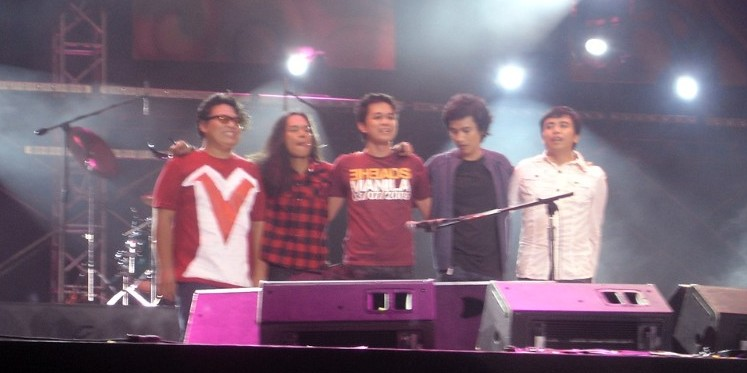
Eraserheads at "The Final Set" Reunion Concert: (R to L) Buddy Zabala, Ely Buendia, Raimund Marasigan and Marcus Adoro together with Jazz Nicolas of Itchyworms (far left) as their session player

In July 2008, the band confirmed they would reunite for a concert at the CCP Open Grounds on August 30. Initially sponsored by Philip Morris, the company later backed out after facing criminal charges by the Philippine Department of Health (DOH) for violating the Tobacco Regulation Act of 2003 prohibiting tobacco companies from sponsoring artistic events; they had also promised a free but invitation-only show for adults and smokers. The concert was later sponsored by Radiohead Productions with tickets being sold and the venue moved to the Bonifacio Global City Open Grounds in Taguig.

The band went ahead with the reunion concert as planned, with Jazz Nicolas of Itchyworms joining in as session musician. However, it was cut short due to Buendia being rushed to Makati Medical Center after experiencing chest pains. The remaining band members went to Saguijo and played what would have been the second set of the concert, with Ebe Dancel on vocals. Buendia later recovered after an angioplasty. The concert was later released as a live album in November, with an accompanying concert film also released in theaters.

In January 2009, the band announced a second reunion concert to be produced by MTV Philippines. Called The Final Set, the sold-out concert was held at the SM Mall of Asia concert grounds in Pasay City on March 7, with an estimated 100,000 people in attendance. The band also paid tribute to Francis M., who had died of leukemia the previous day and was slated to be a guest performer. The concert was later aired on GMA Network as a TV special in April. In February 2009, the band received the MYX Magna Award, which was accepted by Marasigan.

==== 2010s: International tours, Sabado/1995 ====
The band embarked on a North American reunion tour in 2012, playing venues in California, Jersey City, and Toronto. They also performed in Dubai on two separate occasions, as well as Singapore in 2013 and London in April 2014.

In 2012, Star Music released the second Eraserheads tribute album as a soundtrack to the Star Cinema film The Reunion, titled The Reunion: An Eraserheads Tribute Album.

In September 2014, the band released two new songs, “Sabado” and “1995”, as part of the September issue of Esquire magazine. They also held a surprise performance at the magazine issue's launch party in Makati.

In June 2016, the band reunited for a live performance at a rebranding launch event of PLDT and its subsidiary Smart Communications. They also appeared in a promotional campaign by Smart.

A musical adaptation of the band's discography titled Ang Huling El Bimbo premiered in July 2018 at Resorts World Manila. Buendia approved of the musical: “I love the way they stitched all those songs together into one solid musical," he said.

Buendia's record label Offshore Music reissued the band's first four albums, which were remastered by Bernie Grundman. They were later released on vinyl. Meanwhile, Marasigan, Zabala, and Adoro formed the band Ultracombo in 2019. Adoro left the band shortly after.

==== 2022-present: Huling El Bimbo world tour, Combo on the Run documentary ====
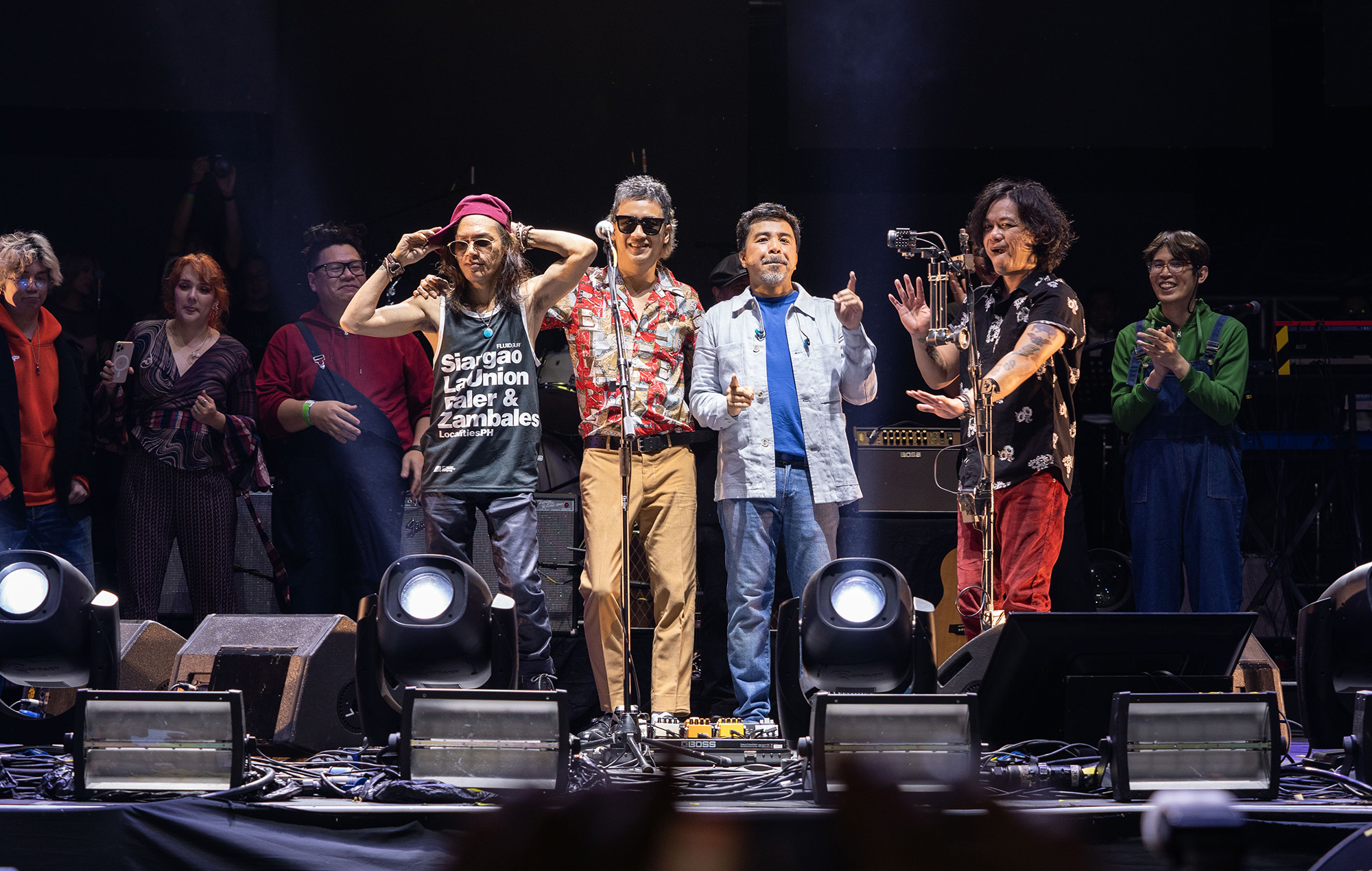
Eraserheads at the Huling El Bimbo concert (2022)

In 2020, Noisemakers released a third Eraserheads tribute album, Pop Machine the Album, featuring covers by Lola Amour, Oh, Flamingo!, and Reese Lansangan.

In September 2022, the band announced a third reunion concert in the Philippines. Titled “Huling El Bimbo”, the reunion concert was held at the SMDC Festival Grounds in Parañaque City on December 22, 2022, with an estimated 75,000 people in attendance. The band played the album Cutterpillow in its entirety for the first set, saving “Ang Huling El Bimbo” for the last set while also performing with guest performers such as Gary Valenciano and a hologram of Francis M. The concert was later released as a live album to streaming services in March 2024.

The band embarked on a world tour from 2023 to 2025, playing venues in the United States, Canada, Singapore, Dubai, Qatar, New Zealand, and Australia. Some of the concerts featured guest musicians like True Faith lead vocalist Medwin Marfil, former Rivermaya guitarist Perf de Castro, Kamikazee lead vocalist Jay Contreras, and Moonstar88 lead vocalist and guitarist Maysh Baay.

In November 2022, the band was honored as Artists of the Year by Esquire Philippines. They also returned to UP to receive the Gawad Oblation award in August 2024. Additionally, they headlined the UAAP Season 87 opening ceremony in September 2024 and made a surprise appearance at the UP Sunken Garden to celebrate the university's championship teams three months later.

A documentary titled Eraserheads: Combo on the Run premiered in Philippine cinemas in March 2025, which tells the story of the band leading up to their 2022 reunion. The band also announced the Electric Fun Music Festival, to be held at SMDC Festival Grounds at a later date, and teased new music at the end of the documentary, which was later announced as "Get This Love Thing Down", an unreleased song from the Carbon Stereoxide sessions. Commenting on the announcements in a press conference, Buendia declared that the band is "here to stay." Meanwhile, Adoro briefly left the band to address newly unveiled allegations of sexual abuse against him.

== Band members ==
- Ely Buendia – lead vocals, rhythm and lead guitar (1989–2002, 2008–2009, 2012–2014, 2016, 2022–present)
- Buddy Zabala – backing vocals, bass guitar, keyboards (1989–2002, 2008–2009, 2012–2014, 2016, 2022–present)
- Marcus Adoro – lead and backing vocals, lead guitar (1989–2002, 2008–2009, 2012–2014, 2016, 2022–present)
- Raimund Marasigan – lead and backing vocals, drums, percussion, rhythm guitar, keyboards (1989–2002, 2008–2009, 2012–2014, 2016, 2022–present)

=== Additional musicians ===
- Noel Garcia - keyboards (1997–1999)
- Mike Dizon - session drummer (1999)
- Kris Gorra-Dancel - lead vocals, rhythm guitar (2002)
- Jazz Nicolas - keyboards, rhythm guitar, drums, percussion, backing vocals (2008–2009, 2022)
- Romel "Sancho" Sanchez - session guitarist (2012–2014)

== Discography ==
- Ultraelectromagneticpop! (1993)
- Circus (1994)
- Cutterpillow (1995)
- Fruitcake (1996)
- Sticker Happy (1997)
- Natin99 (1999)
- Carbon Stereoxide (2001)

== Filmography ==
=== Fictionalized ===
- Run Barbi Run (1995)

=== Documentaries and filmed performances ===
- Eraserheads: The Reunion Concert (2008)
- Eraserheads Live! The Final Set (2009)
- Pop-U-Mentary (2010)
- Eraserheads: Combo on the Run (2025)

== Awards and nominations ==
Year	Award	Category	Recipient	Result
1993	Rock & Rhythm Magazine	Album of the Year	Ultraelectromagneticpop!	Won
1994	1st NU Rock Awards	Album of the Year	Ultraelectromagneticpop!	Won
1994	7th Awit Awards	Best Performance by a New Duo/Group	"Ligaya"	Won
1995	2nd NU Rock Awards	Listener's Choice Award	Eraserheads	Won
1995	2nd NU Rock Awards	Band of the Year	Eraserheads	Won
1995	2nd NU Rock Awards	Album of the Year	Circus	Won
1995	Guillermo Memorial Award	Most Favorite Band	Eraserheads	Won
1996	3rd NU Rock Awards	Album of the Year	Cutterpillow	Won
1996	3rd NU Rock Awards	Best Music Video	"Ang Huling El Bimbo"	Won
1996	3rd NU Rock Awards	Song of the Year	"Ang Huling El Bimbo"	Won
1996	9th Awit Awards	Album of the Year	Cutterpillow	Won
1996	2nd Katha Music Awards	Album of the Year	Cutterpillow	Won
1996	2nd Katha Music Awards	Best Rock Album	Cutterpillow	Won
1996	2nd Katha Music Awards	Best Rock Song	"Ang Huling El Bimbo"	Won
1996	2nd Katha Music Awards	Best Rock Group	Eraserheads	Won
1997	4th NU Rock Awards	Artist of the Year	Eraserheads	Won
1997	4th NU Rock Awards	Listener's Choice Award	Eraserheads	Won
1997	4th NU Rock Awards	Producer of the Year	Robin Rivera (Fruitcake)	Won
1997	4th NU Rock Awards	Best Album Packaging	Fruitcake	Won
1997	4th NU Rock Awards	Best Video	"Fruitcake"	Won
1997	3rd Katha Music Awards	Best Album Packaging	Fruitcake	Won
1997	3rd Katha Music Awards	Best Rock Vocal Performance	"Fruitcake"	Won
1997	10th Awit Awards	Best Alternative Recording	"Fruitcake"	Won
1997	Monster Radio 93.1 : Countdown Top 7	Most Popular Group/Singer/Entertainer	Eraserheads	Won
1997	Guillermo Memorial Award	Most Popular Group/Singer/Entertainer	Eraserheads	Won
1997	Parangal Ng Bayan Award	Band of the Year	Eraserheads	Won
1997	1997 MTV Video Music Awards	Viewer's Choice Award for Asia	"Ang Huling El Bimbo"	Won
1998	11th Awit Awards	Album of the Year	Sticker Happy	Won
1999	6th NU Rock Awards	Drummer of the Year	Raimund Marasigan	Won
1999	12th Awit Awards	Best Alternative Recording	"Julie Tearjerky"	Won
2000	13th Awit Awards	Best Performance by a Group/Duo	"Pop Machine"	Won
2003	10th NU Rock Awards	Hall of Fame	Eraserheads	Won
2004	4th MTV Pilipinas Music Awards	Lifetime Achievement Award	Eraserheads	Won
2009	4th Myx Music Awards	MYX Magna Award	Eraserheads	Won
2009	Guillermo Memorial Award	Record Breaking Concert of the Year	Eraserheads: The Reunion Concert	Won
2010	22nd Awit Awards	Album of the Year	Eraserheads: The Reunion Concert	Won
2012	25th Awit Awards	Dangal ng Musikang Pilipino Award	Eraserheads	Won
2022	Esquire	Esquire's Artist of the Year	Eraserheads	Won
2024	University of the Philippines	Gawad Oblation Award	Eraserheads	Won

== Bibliography ==
- Pillbox, Vol. 1, Issue 1, 1996. Published by Pop Infinity Limited Laundry Corporation.
- Fruitcake, edited by Jessica Zafra and illustrated by Cynthia Bauzon. Anvil Corporation, Inc., 1997.
- Pillbox, Vol. 3, 1998. Published by BMG Records Pilipinas.
- Tikman Ang Langit: An Anthology on the Eraserheads, compiled by Melvin Calimag and Jing Garcia. Visual Print Enterprises, 2007.
- Alternate Endings: The Making of The Final Set and The Unmaking of an Era, words by Aldus Santos and design by Gelo Lagasca. Offshore Music, 2020.

Awards
Preceded by New award	NU Rock Awards; Album of the Year; Ultraelectromagneticpop! 1994	Succeeded by Circus; Eraserheads
Preceded by Ultraelectromagneticpop! Eraserheads	NU Rock Awards; Album of the Year; Circus; 1995	Succeeded by Cutterpillow; Eraserheads
Preceded by Circus; Eraserheads	NU Rock Awards; Album of the Year; Cutterpillow; 1996	Succeeded by P.O.T. P.O.T.
