= Sony Music Philippines =

Philippine record label

- Parent company: Sony Music Entertainment
- Founded: 1995; 31 years ago (original); 2018; 8 years ago (relaunch)
- Defunct: February 2012; 14 years ago (original)
- Genre: Various
- Country of origin: Philippines
- Location: Pasig (2005–12, 2018–present)
- Official website: sonymusic.com.ph

Sony Music Philippines, Inc. is a record label based in the Philippines, which was founded in 1995 as an imprint of the international music label Sony Music Entertainment and a part of its Asia-Pacific chain. After the closure of the local label caused by widespread piracy problems in the Philippines in 2012, it resumed its operations in 2018.

== History ==
In 1995, after OctoArts International (now PolyEast Records) signed a distribution deal with EMI, Sony Music Philippines was established with its first office on Shaw Boulevard in Mandaluyong. In 2005, as an after-effect of the Sony BMG merger (which happened a year earlier), it merged with Bertelsmann's local label BMG Records (Pilipinas) Inc. (itself founded in the early 1990s) to become Sony BMG Music Entertainment Philippines. A few months later, its offices were transferred from the Equitable Bank Building in Cubao, Quezon City to the Taipan Place in Ortigas, Pasig for even lower taxes and better work amenities. In 2009, the label was renamed Sony Music Entertainment Philippines, and also began partnering with GMA Records for releases of some artists like Aljur Abrenica and La Diva.

Ivory Music and Video (formerly Ivory Records) began handling distribution for Sony Music's catalog in the Philippines on July 1, 2011, and in February 2012, the label closed its office at the Taipan Place in Ortigas, Pasig after a long battle with widespread piracy. This was the first time since the early 1990s (under OctoArts) that international Sony Music releases were licensed by an independent Philippine label. The distribution contract expired in late 2017, and Ivory was eventually acquired by independent entertainment company Viva Communications through its music unit on the day of what could have been the twelfth anniversary of the date they started to handle the Sony catalog.

Sony Music Philippines started to re-open in 2018 (and since then it became fully independent since early 2011), and in July 2019, the label held a press event in Pasig marking its formal re-launching, announcing the new roster of artists signed to them which includes Ben&Ben, The Vowels They Orbit, Alex Bruce, Syd Hartha, and the band Nathan & Mercury.

In late 2019, Filipino boy band SB19 signed a recording contract with the label. In March 2022, Filipina girl group 4th Impact also signed a recording contract.

In 2020, artists from Balcony Entertainment, including its founder Rico Blanco and actress/singer Maris Racal, signed an agreement with Sony Music Philippines to distribute single/album releases from the Balcony roster.

In 2021, SME launched Waterwalk Records, a sublabel focused on Contemporary Christian music featuring artists like Morissette.

In 2023, Sony Music Philippines formed a partnership with Ely Buendia's label Offshore Music, allowing SMP to distribute Offshore's music catalogs worldwide.

== Artists ==
=== Current ===
- Rivermaya (1994–2001; since 2022)
- 6cyclemind (2003–2012; since 2022) (Soupstar Entertainment; distribution only)
- Sponge Cola (2004–2005; since 2020)
- Itchyworms (2008–2012; since 2020)
- Rico Blanco (since 2020)
- Ben&Ben (since 2019)
- SB19 (since 2019)
- James Reid
- KAIA
- 4th Impact (since 2022)
- IV of Spades (since 2025)
- Barbie Almalbis (1996–1998; since 2020)
- Christian Bautista (since 2025)
- The Vowels They Orbit (Soupstar Entertainment; distribution only)
- Syd Hartha
- of Mercury (f/k/a Nathan & Mercury)
- Oh, Flamingo!
- Timothy Run (Tim Marquez)
- Mona Gonzales
- Ace Banzuelo
- Henyong Makata
- We Got (Soupstar Entertainment; distribution only)
- Bea Lorenzo
- Abaddon
- Nobody's Home
- Kunnns
- Plan-B
- Michael Bars
- Ren (Enka RatVu)
- Cris Cyrus Gondra
- Lili (Lily Gonzales)
- Nobita
- Lady Mazta
- Pablo
- Munimuni
- ABY
- Baet Alcantara
- Bianca Lipana
- Flict G
- Jarlo Base (Dane Hipolito)
- Any Name's Okay
- Loir
- YARA
- Jason Marvin
- Denise Julia
- Waiian
- DEMI
- Tothapi (since 2024)
- HELLMERRY
- O SIDE MAFIA
- Alex Bruce

==== Offmute (sublabel) ====
- Clara Benin
- Young Cocoa

==== Waterwalk Records (sublabel) ====
- Morissette (Underdog Music PH / Stages Productions)
- Hazel Faith
- EJ De Perio
- Janine Danielle
- Sam&Steff
- Gloryfall

==== Associated/affiliated labels ====
Balcony Entertainment

- Suzara (Bolichie and Top Suzara)
- Raven Aviso
- Maris Racal

Yellow Room Music (independent label owned by Monty Macalino)

- 647
- Autotelic
- Sharlene San Pedro
- Kuatro Kantos
- Leila Manalac
- Madeline
- Suddenly Monday
- Southern Lights
- Eloisa Jayloni
- Lindenwood

Offshore Music

- ALYSON
- Amateurish
- Apartel
- Aviators
- Bree
- Carousel Casualties
- CRISHA
- Diego's Scenes
- Eliza Marie
- Elton Clark
- Ely Buendia
- Ena Mori
- Experience
- FOW
- GundamFunk Aviators
- Halina
- Her Name Is Noelle
- JDRX
- JR Oca Experience
- Juicebox
- Ligaya Escueta
- Marion Talavera
- M1ss Jade So
- MI MI
- Mt. Lewis
- neytan
- Paco Pastor
- Pamphleteer
- Pinkmen
- Sansette
- Pixie Labrador
- Savannah
- Sexy Jay
- Seedy and the Years
- Sulo
- Shades of Native
- Stef Aranas
- Tinay
- The Fixtion
- Velvet Howl

Off the Record

- Ica Frias
- Jensen Gomez
- New Lore (f/k/a No Lore)
- Rienne
- Tota (Josh Villena)
- Paham

=== Former ===
Musiko Records/BMG Records (Pilipinas)

- Eraserheads (1989–2002; catalog now handled by Sony Music Philippines and Offshore Music)
- Smokey Mountain (1991–1995)
- Ariel Rivera (1991–2009)
- Bodjie's Law of Gravity
- Michael Laygo
- Labuyo
- Grace Nono (1992–1999)
- Francis Magalona (1994–2007; died in 2009)
- Lea Salonga (1996–2012)
- J Brothers (1996–2005)
- The Company (1996–2000)
- Angelika Dela Cruz (1996–2000)
- Novia (1997–1999)
- Anna Fegi (1997–2005)
- Cris Villonco (1997–2003)
- Madz (1998–2010)
- 6AL (AnimAL)
- Yano
- Bing Rodrigo
- Color It Red
- Barako Boys
- Boysvoyz
- Calvin Millado
- Mike Luis
- Times Two
- Willie Nepomuceno
- Agot Isidro (1999)
- Dingdong Avanzado (Infiniti Music; distribution only from 1997–99)
- Sunshine Cruz (Infiniti Music; distribution only from 1999–2000)
- Bigtime
- Jo Awayan
- Cornelia Luna
- Ilonah Jean
- Chad Borja
- Heavy Metal
- Babyshake Rico
- aka Bigtime
- Michael Terry
- Nelson Del Castillo
- Mar Silverio
- Paul Toledo
- Squid 9
- SexBomb Girls (2001–2011)
- Sharon Cuneta (2001–2005 (BMG) and 2005–2012 (Sony BMG); now under Star Music)
- Lito Camo
- Louie Ocampo
- Ciudad
- Hajji Alejandro
- Edgie and The Jackalites
- Lou Bonnevie
- Jun Lopito
- Sugar Hiccup
- Ang Tunay Na Amo
- Odette Quesada
- Luke Mejares (2003–2011)
- Father & Sons
- Ciara Sotto
- Jimmy Bondoc (2003–2011)
- Joey De Leon (2003–2007)
- Agaw Agimat
- Cecile Fernandez
- Fatal Posporos
- Kaya
- Jao Mapa
- Fourmula

Sony Music Entertainment Philippines (first incarnation)

- South Border (1996–2005; now independent)
- Razorback (1997–2004; now under Hebigat Sounds Inc.)
- Jenine Desiderio (1997–2001)
- Hungry Young Poets
- Ghetto Doggs (1999–2000; now defunct)
- G. Toengi (1999–2001)
- Sandwich (1999–2003; now under PolyEast Records)
- The Dawn (2000–2004; now under Solstice Ventures Inc.)
- DaPulis
- Mae Rivera (2000–2003)
- Champagne Morales (2000–2002)
- Andrew E.
- Kapatid (2003–2006)
- Mayonnaise (2003–2007; now under Yellow Room and Ivory Music and Video)
- Kjwan (2004–2006)

Musiko Records/Sony BMG Music Entertainment Philippines/Sony Music Entertainment Philippines (second incarnation)

- Jose Manalo
- Wally Bayola
- Brownman Revival (2005–2010)
- Cueshé (2005–2011; now under Big Dipper Entertainment)
- Pupil (2005–2012; now under UMG Philippines)
- Callalily (2006–2011; now under Callalily Entertainment/Sindikato Inc./O/C Records/Viva Records)
- Gian Magdangal (2006–2010)
- Gloc-9 (2006–2012; now under Universal Records)
- Lovi Poe (2006–2010; now under ABS-CBN)
- Mau Marcelo (2006–2009)
- Moonstar88 (2007–2012; now under Soupstar Music)
- Zelle (2007–2012)
- Sugarpop (2007–2009)
- KC Concepcion (2008–2012; now under Cornerstone Entertainment)
- Gretchen Espina (2008–2010; quit showbiz)
- Moymoy Palaboy (2008–2011)
- Joanna Ampil (2008–2011)
- Letter Day Story (2009–2012)
- La Diva (2009–2010)
- Rachel Alejandro (2009–2011; now under Star Music)
- Aljur Abrenica (2010–2011)
- Eevee (2010–2012; now under Ivory Music & Video)
- Kiss Jane (2010–2012)
- Cesar Montano (2010–2012)
- The Opera Belles (2010–2012)
- Mark Alain (2011–2012)
- Sheng Belmonte (2011–2012)
- Stephanie Dan (2011–2012)
- Kaligta (2011–2012)

== See also ==
- PolyEast Records
- Star Music
- UMG Philippines
- Universal Records (Philippines)
- Viva Records
  - Ivory Music and Video
