= Basti Artadi =

Filipino musician (born 1973)

- Born: Sebastian Artadi; May 3, 1973 (age 53); Pampanga, Philippines
- Origin: Manila, Philippines
- Genres: Heavy metal; hard rock; grunge; Pinoy rock
- Occupations: Musician; songwriter; actor; painter
- Years active: 1992–present
- Member of: Wolfgang; Brain Salad; Plan of Fools; Basti Artadi and the Nice Ones
- Formerly of: Lokomotiv; Sin City

Sebastian "Basti" Artadi (born May 3, 1973) is a Filipino musician, songwriter, and actor. He is known as the lead vocalist of the rock band Wolfgang, which was active from 1992 to 2002 and later regrouped in 2007. After the band disbanded, he became a member of California-based band Lokomotiv until 2007. He launched a side project called Plan of Fools as vocalist, and also provided lead vocals for Brain Salad. Aside from music, he ventured into theatre, performing in Jesus Christ Superstar (2001) and the musical American Idiot (2016).

== Early life ==
Sebastian Artadi was born on May 3, 1973, in Pampanga, and was raised in Lucena. He has a sister named Sabrina Artadi, a former Binibining Pilipinas contestant. As a child, he was a fan of Johnny Cash, but his musical interests later expanded to rock and heavy metal. While still a high school in 1993, his father brought him to his first rock concert, having previously been exposed only to the music played on the car stereo.

During his college years, Artadi was invited by the band Razorback to sing with them, as they were in need of a vocalist. He was given tapes of the songs the band knew, which introduced him to rock music.

== Career ==
=== Wolfgang ===
Artadi began his journey with Wolfgang in the early 1990s when he was discovered performing with his previous band Sin City. He was later invited by guitarist Manuel Legarda and drummer Wolf Gemora to join their new group, eventually completed by bassist Ramon "Mon" Legaspi. The band's name, suggested by Razorback guitarist Dave Aguirre, served as their nom de sonique, referencing Gemora's nickname. The band made a name for itself in Manila's rock scene and released its self-titled debut album in 1995, which went Platinum. Artadi’s vocals stood out on tracks like "Darkness Fell" and "Left Alone", both of which were frequently played on local rock radio stations.

Wolfgang followed up with several albums, including Semenelin (1996), Wurm (1997), and Serve in Silence (1999), earning multiple awards at the NU107 Rock Awards. Artadi was named Vocalist of the Year several times during this period. The band released fifth album Black Mantra (2001), which would be their last before disbanding in 2002. They later reunited in 2007 and released Villains (2008), followed by the Tagalog-language extended play (EP) Ang Bagong Dugo Sa Lumang Ugat - Unang Kabanata (2012).

In 2025, Artadi announced the release of Wolfgang30, a re-recorded and remastered version of the band's self-titled debut album, marking its 30th anniversary. The album is set for release exclusively on vinyl (limited to 300 copies) and as a box set through the independent label Eikon Records Philippines. According to the label, the album was re-recorded between 2024 and 2025 by Artadi, guitarist Manuel Legarda, original drummer Wolf Gemora, and includes some of the final recordings of late bassist Mon Legaspi.

=== Lokomotiv ===
After Wolfgang's disbandment in 2002, Artadi relocated to California, United States. In early 2004, he joined the California-based band Lokomotiv, which had been formed the previous year in Orange County by Wolf Gemora, bassist Danny Gonzales, and guitarist James MacDonnell. Following MacDonnell's departure, Artadi was invited to become the band's lead vocalist. The lineup also included David Aguirre of Razorback.

The band recorded their debut album, Rock N' Roll Death Toll (2005) and released it in the Philippines in September 2006. Artadi left the band on June 24, 2006, due to "musical and creative differences".

=== Brain Salad ===
In 2001, Artadi fronted the rock supergroup Brain Salad, a one-off project featuring musicians from Wolfgang and Razorback. The band released a self-titled album that same year, which has since been regarded as a hidden gem in Filipino rock and was later reissued on vinyl by Backspacer Records in 2022. The reissue was remastered by sound engineer Shinji Tanaka.

=== Plan of Fools ===
Artadi began a recording project with a band called Plan of Fools. The group is an eight-piece ensemble that includes prominent Filipino musicians such as Louie Talan (Razorback), Bea Lao (General Luna), and Rommel dela Cruz (Freestyle and Barbie's Cradle). Artadi described the project as a serious musical endeavor, stating, "We're putting the finishing touches on this new album with this band I'm with called Plan of Fools."

=== Solo career and other projects ===
Artadi has also worked as a theater actor. He portrayed Jesus Christ in Atlantis Productions' staging of Jesus Christ Superstar in 2001. The production featured stylized design and unconventional casting, with Dessa and Anna Fegi alternated as a reimagined female version of Pontius Pilate.

Artadi released his first debut album, Everybody Knows That the Dice Are Loaded (2014), featuring a collection of songs he performs live with the band the Nice Ones. The lineup includes guitarist Marco de Leon, bassist Nikki Tirona, and drummer Jed Dayrit. The music revealed a different side of Artadi, with a sound that was "fresh" and more melodic compared to his heavier rock background.

In 2016, he portrayed the character St. Jimmy in the local staging of the Philippine production of Green Day's musical American Idiot. That same year, he also provided live scoring for the Austrian silent film Der Ballett erzherzog during the 10th International Silent Film Festival held in August.

In June 2022, Artadi starred in the play Fermata, written by Dustin Celestino and directed by Guelan Luarca. He played Alex, a retired musician who runs a jazz bar. The two-character play also starred Xander Soriano as Ben. On December 27, Artadi posted a photo of himself on social media after a promotional poster for his song "God of Light" caused concern among fans due to its layout resembling a tribute image. The song premiered exclusively on Jam 88.3 (DWJM). The poster drew mixed reactions, including from musician Inka Magnaye and Moonstar88 vocalist Maysh Baay, prompting the station to clarify its intent.

Artadi released an independent second album titled Black on Black, Blood on White (2023), which featured nine tracks. Artadi also launched his first graphic novel Darkness Fell, with a special interactive performance held at 19 East in Sucat, Parañaque. The 36-page self-published black-and-white graphic novel was inspired by the Wolfgang song of the same name from the band's debut album.

In September 2024, Artadi stated that Wolfgang would not support the vinyl reissue of their album by Ivory Music and Vicor Music due to low royalty fees. He revealed that the band was set to receive only ₱2.40 per vinyl record sold at a retail price of ₱1,900, to be divided among the members and the heirs of late bassist Mon Legaspi. Artadi urged fans to wait for an alternative release that would properly compensate the band.

Artadi was among the featured artists in Un|Tethered, an exhibition by Galeria Paloma at Art Fair Philippines 2024. He was featured alongside artists such as Ernest Concepcion, Carla Gamalinda, Carlos, and National Artist for Music Ryan Cayabyab.

== Personal life ==
Artadi is married to Rissa Potenciano Artadi and are parents to twins. 1985 Binibini Pilipinas International Sabrina Roig Artadi is his sister. Aside from his music and acting career, he is also a painter, and has pursued visual art. He strongly advocates for artists rights. He has often been described using the Filipino word "angas" (transl. cool) due to his tough persona.

In 2009, Artadi was diagnosed with a tumor in his head, which caused facial paralysis on the right side of his face. He later revealed that the condition was due to schwannoma, a type of benign nerve sheath tumor that affected the seventh cranial nerve.

== Discography ==
=== with Wolfgang ===
==== Albums ====
- Wolfgang (1995)
- Semenelin (1996)
- Wurm (1997)
- Serve in Silence (1999)
- Black Mantra (2001)
- Villains (2008)

==== EP ====
- Ang Bagong Dugo Sa Lumang Ugat – Unang Kabanata (2012)

=== with Lokomotiv ===
- Rock N' Roll Death Toll (2005)

=== with Brain Salad ===
- Brain Salad (2001)

=== Solo ===
- Everybody Knows That the Dice Are Loaded (2014)
- "Black on Black" / "Blood on White" (2023)

=== With Plan of Fools ===
- Plan of Fools (2020)

== Filmography ==
=== Film ===
Year	Title	Role	Notes
2015	The Breakup Playlist	Caloy	Feature film
2017	Historiographika Errata	Lt. Tasker	Cinema One Originals
2018	Tres	Virgo	Anthology film (uncredited)

=== Television ===
Year	Title	Role	Notes
2013-2015	That Show	as himself	61 episodes
2014	The Boston	Serges	S1.E5: "If You Don't Speak, Your Stomach Swells" S1.E6: "Truffle Up and Deal"

=== Theatre ===
Year	Production	Role	Company / Event
2001	Jesus Christ Superstar	Jesus Christ	Atlantis Productions
2016	American Idiot	St. Jimmy	9 Works Theatrical
2022	Fermata	Alex	Virgin Labfest (CCP Tanghalang Huseng Batute)
