= Chicosci discography =

Philippine discography

- Studio albums: 5
- Compilation albums: 1
- Singles: 14
- Music videos: 7

This is the discography of the Philippine Rock band Chicosci.

== Albums ==
Year	Album title	Certifications
2000	Revenge of the Giant Robot: Released: 2000; Label: EMI Philippines	–
2002	Method of Breathing: Released: 2002; Label: EMI Philippines	–
2004	Icarus: Released: 2004; Label: Viva Records	–
2006	Chicosci: Released: 6 June 2006; Label: Universal-MCA Philippines	–
2009	Fly Black Hearts: Released: 17 September 2009; Label: Universal-MCA Philippines	–
2012	This Is Not A Chicosci Record: Released: 31 October 2012; Label: Universal-MCA Philippines	–

== Compilation albums ==
- BEST (2007)

== Singles ==
Year	Singles	Album
2000	Soopafly	Revenge of the Giant Robot
2000	Amen	Revenge of the Giant Robot
2001	Sink or Swim	Revenge of the Giant Robot
2002	Glass is Broken	Method of Breathing
2002	Rolento	Method of Breathing
2003	Paris	Method of Breathing
2004	Shallow Graves	Icarus
2004	Theme from Conversations with Fire	Icarus
2004	An Argument	Icarus
2006	A Promise	Chicosci
2007	7 Black Roses	Chicosci
2007	Chicosci Vampire Social Club	Chicosci
2008	Last Look	Chicosci
2009	Diamond Shotgun	Fly Black Hearts
2010	Breathe Again	Fly Black Hearts
2010	What's Your Poison?	Fly Black Hearts
2011	Unbelievable	90's Music Comes Alive
2012	Magasin	The Reunion: An Eraserheads Tribute Album
2012	Stealing Kisses	This Is Not A Chicosci Record

== Music videos ==
Year	Title	Director
2001	Sink or Swim	Lyle Sacris
2003	Paris	Marl Nitura
2004	Shallow Graves	Quark Henares
2006	A Promise	Trinka Lat
2007	7 Black Roses	Treb Monteras II
2007	Chicosci Vampire Social Club	
2008	Last Look	
2009	Diamond Shotgun	
2010	Breathe Again	
2010	What's Your Poison?	
