= Wency Cornejo =

Filipino singer and actor (born 1967)

- Born: Wenceslao Tiangco Cornejo III; April 2, 1967 (age 59)
- Education: University of the Philippines Diliman
- Occupations: Singer; composer; theater actor; producer; chef; entrepreneur
- Children: 1
- Relatives: Mel Tiangco (mother)

Wenceslao Tiangco Cornejo III (born April 2, 1967), better known as Wency Cornejo, is a Filipino singer and composer from the Philippines. He is best known as the vocalist of the Filipino band AfterImage and also served as the band's principal composer. After the band disbanded after eleven years, Cornejo pursued a solo singing career and released his own albums. In 2003, his 2002 solo album Hanggang garnered three awards at the Awit Awards, while a song he wrote, Isang Kinabukasan, also received an award at the Catholic Mass Media Awards in 2008. He was likewise named Artist of the Year at the NU Awards in 2004.

He is also a theater actor, producer, chef and entrepreneur.

== Early life ==
Wency Cornejo was born on April 2, 1967. He is the eldest of four siblings. He and his siblings were raised by their mother, journalist and television newscaster Mel Tiangco, as a single parent. There is an age gap of only about 11 years and 8 months between Wency and his mother, Mel. (Note: Mel Tiangco was born August 10, 1955 while Wency was born on April 2, 1967.) Based on the generational suffix in Wency's name, "the Third" or "III," his father's full name was possibly Wenceslao Cornejo Jr. During his childhood, he lived with his grandmother Florencia (Mel's mother) for several years. Aspiring to become a doctor, he studied at the University of the Philippines (UP) and took up Zoology, but he did not finish the course because his studies were disrupted by singing. He later shifted to Broadcast Communications after becoming tired and deciding not to pursue medicine. He reached UP's maximum residency rule; however, he was still able to graduate in 1991 after seven years.

== Career ==
Wency auditioned twice for the vocal group Kundirana of La Salle Green Hills but was ultimately not accepted. When he sang in one of his classes while still in college, he was noticed by a classmate who encouraged him to join a band that was looking for a vocalist. In an unexpected turn that led him into the world of singing, Wency was accepted into the band suggested by his classmate, AfterImage. He became the band's vocalist and principal songwriter.

He gained recognition through AfterImage, but after eleven years and three studio albums, the band disbanded and Wency pursued a solo career. He released solo studio albums such as Treasure (1998), Langit sa Lupa (2003), and Wency Cornejo Silver Series (2006). His 2003 and 2006 albums included the song "Magpakailanman," which served as the theme song of the television program Magpakailanman, hosted by his mother, Mel. Wency's version of the song was featured on his mother's program from 2002 to 2007. In later years, versions of the song by Kyla and Golden Cañedo were featured on Magpakailanman. Aside from being a singer and composer, he also served as the producer of the album Langit sa Lupa. From 1998 to 1999, he was also a host of the cultural television program Tipong Pinoy alongside Susan Calo-Medina, which aired on GMA Network and was produced by the National Commission for Culture and the Arts. AfterImage reunited in 2008 and released a fourth album. The reunion included Wency and nearly all of the original members.

Disillusioned with the music industry, he went to Davao in Mindanao in 2010 and became an entrepreneur. He established a restaurant which he named Carmela, after his mother. He also cooked at his restaurant and said that he learned how to cook from his grandmother Florencia. While in Davao, Wency considered himself semi-retired from singing, but he continued to accept performance engagements in the Philippines and abroad.

The restaurant Carmela lasted only seven years, and in 2017 Wency returned to Manila. He resumed his music career, though he still planned to open a restaurant in Manila. In 2018, he signed a contract with Star Music and announced that he would release digital singles. In the same year, Wency also entered theater acting. He portrayed Sir in the musical Side Show staged by Atlantis Theatrical Entertainment Group. Side Show is an original musical by Bill Russell that was first staged in 1997 on Broadway in New York City, United States.

He also co-founded the band Scarlett Boogie with Cooky Chua of Color It Red, a group that pays tribute to European new wave music of the 1980s. He likewise collaborated with other musicians who rose to prominence in the 1990s for concert performances. In 2020, Wency held a concert with Jett Pangan of The Dawn, Dong Abay of Yano, and Basti Artadi of Wolfgang. In 2025, he also held a concert with Cooky Chua, Naldy Padilla of Orient Pearl, and Lei Bautista of Prettier Than Pink.

== Awards ==
The duet performed by Wency Cornejo and Cooky Chua (the vocalist of the band Color It Red) for the song "Walang Hanggan" won an award in 1997 at the 10th Awit Awards for Best Performance by a Duet. According to Wency, the song "Walang Hanggan" is his personal favorite among all the songs he has written, produced, and performed. In 2000, the song "Ngayon, Kahapon, Bukas," which he performed together with Rachel Alejandro, won Best Song Written for Movie/TV/Stage Play at the Awit Awards as well as Best Movie Theme Song at the Star Awards. The song was performed for the film Warat, released by Viva Films, starring Joyce Jimenez and Jomari Yllana.

The song "Hanggang" gave Wency three awards at the Awit Awards in 2003: Best Traditional Recording, Best Musical Arrangement, and Best Ballad Recording. The song "Hanggang" was written by Gigi and Ronaldo M. Cordero, not by Wency. The song was part of the "Himig Handog" songwriting competition of ABS-CBN and Star Records, and was initially offered to April Boy Regino and then to Luke Mejares of the band South Border, but ultimately went to Wency. Wency also submitted an entry to "Himig Handog," and his composition "Kailan Ka Darating" was selected in 2003.

At the NU Awards in 2004, Wency won Artist of the Year. A song he wrote, "Isang Kinabukasan," won Best Music Video at the Catholic Mass Media Awards (CMMA). The song is part of the album of the same name, which also won Best Secular Album at the CMMA. "Isang Kinabukasan" was performed by Wency and various other singers.

For Wency, the award he considers the greatest achievement he has received is the victory of the song "Habang May Buhay" at the Katha Awards in 1995, which garnered awards for both him and his band AfterImage. Wency was inspired to write "Habang May Buhay" by the death of his father-in-law and by the emotions of a person who suddenly loses a life partner after many years together.

== Personal life ==
Wency has a son named Ezekiel. When Wency lived alone in Davao for seven years, Ezekiel stayed at the home of his grandmother, Mel Tiangco; however, when Ezekiel turned 19, he was already under the care of his mother. (Note: According to one source, Wency lived alone in Davao while Ezekiel stayed at the home of his grandmother, Mel, and was already under the care of his mother when he turned 19 however, another source states that Ezekiel was with Wency in Davao.) In a clarification posted on his Facebook account, Wency denied being related to the model and actress Deniece Cornejo.

In 2020, Wency was diagnosed with Bell's palsy. He shared in February 2026 that he went through a life-threatening ordeal during a recent knee arthroscopic surgery when he stopped breathing under anesthesia and needed to be given extra oxygen, prompting him to reflect that he "could've died."
