= Pan (band) =

Filipino folk and punk rock band

- Origin: Metro Manila
- Genre: folk/punk rock
- Years active: 2002–2005
- Past members: Dong Abay - vocals Onie Badiang - bass Duane Cruz - bass Melvin Leyson - drums

Pan is a Filipino folk/punk rock band formed in 2002. The band was formed as a duo composed of former Yano bandmates Dong Abay on vocals and Onie Badiang on bass; the duo later added Duane Cruz and Melvin Leyson to play the bass and drums live.

The band only released one album, Parnaso ng Payaso. The song "Hula" (transl. "Prediction") from that album won as Best Folk/Pop Recording at the 2003 Awit Awards.

In early 2005, Abay left Pan to pursue an indie career, resulting in the band going inactive.

== Discography ==
Parnaso ng Payaso
No.	Title	Length
1.	"Mabuhay"	3:37
2.	"Kahimanawari"	4:11
3.	"Rebolusyon"	4:36
4.	"Hula"	3:32
5.	"Kawatan"	5:12
6.	"Dumpsite"	4:38
7.	"Gusto"	4:38
8.	"Eko"	4:28
9.	"Precious"	3:44
10.	"Tayo"	2:59
11.	"Huling Hiling"	2:59
12.	"Totoy T."	3:21
13.	"Himig"	4:32
14.	"Tagpuan"	4:23

== Awards ==
Year	Award giving body	Category	Nominated work	Results
2003	"16th Awit Awards"	Best Folk Pop Recording	"Hula"	Won
2003	NU Rock Awards	Best Album Packaging	"Parnaso ng Payaso"	Won
2003	NU Rock Awards	Album of the Year	"Parnaso ng Payaso"	Nominated
2003	NU Rock Awards	Best New Artist	—N/a	Nominated
2003	NU Rock Awards	Artist of the Year	—N/a	Nominated
2003	NU Rock Awards	Song of the Year	"Dumpsite"	Nominated
2003	NU Rock Awards	Best Music Video	"Dumpsite"	Nominated
2003	NU Rock Awards	Vocalist of the Year	"Dong Abay"	Nominated
