= NU Rock Awards =

Former Filipino music award

- Location: Metro Manila
- Country: Philippines
- Presented by: NU 107
- First award: 1994
- Final award: 2010

The NU Rock Awards was an annual accolade presented from 1994 to 2010 by the Metro Manila-based radio station NU 107, known for prominent performances by the most influential pinoy rock artists of each year.

== History ==
The first NU 107 Rock Awards was held at The Music Hall in Annapolis St., Greenhills on November 15, 1994. Originally meant to be a small gathering to give recognition to the rock community, it slowly became a much anticipated annual event. Pepe Smith won the Rock Legend Award. and the Dawn won the Rock Achievement Award.

The first "Song of the Year Award" was given to Alamid for "Your Love". The song went on to heavy airplay and was the first NU 107 exclusive to cross over to other formats. Afterimage was very first winner of the Artist of the Year award. The first Album of the Year award was presented to the Eraserheads' first album Ultraelectromagneticpop!. The Eraserheads received the Album of the Year award in the following two years with their albums Circus (1995) and Cutterpillow (1996), making them the only artist to win in the same category three years in a row.

Pambansang Banda ng Pilipinas Parokya Ni Edgar also won their "Best New Artists" in 1996 and also won 8 times overall years later. "Producer of the Year" category The Dawn has performed in the Rock Awards eleven times.

The first "Video of the Year" awardwas given to "Ang Huling El Bimbo" by the Eraserheads.

In 1997, they added a new category "Producer of the Year".

There has only been one tie in the history of the Rock Awards, in 1999, when the judges made Wolfgang's Serve in Silence and Sandwich's Grip Stand Throw joint Albums of the Year.

Raimund Marasigan has the most awards, for his work as a member of Eraserheads and Sandwich, and as an album producer for other bands.

The first band to win the Rock Awards’ "Raw Award" was Fatal Posporos. The Raw Award is given to the best unsigned artist of the year.

In 2000, Punk's Not Dead, an all-star tribute band made up of Myra Ruaro (Brownbeat All Stars), Louie Talan (Razorback), Diego Castillo (Sandwich), Raimund Marasigan (Sandwich), Zach Lucero and Aia de Leon (Imago), performed a medley of past Song of the Year winners in the style of The Ramones.

In 2004, NU 107, acknowledging the growing role of women in the local rock scene, made the first Female Rock Icon Award to Cynthia Alexander.

Before it became a rock anthem of sorts, Bamboo's "Noypi" was first performed at the 2003 NU 107 Rock Awards, before their album As The Music Plays was released.

Despite being held during a typhoon, the 2004 Rock Awards ceremony was the best attended, with over 4,000 rock fans filling the World Trade Center.

In 2005, there were a record twelve nominees for the Song Of The Year Award.

The 17th and final Rock Awards was held on October 29, 2010.

== List of winners ==
=== Best New Artist ===
Year	Winner
1994	Yano The Youth
1995	Put3ska
1996	Parokya Ni Edgar
1997	P.O.T.
1998	Orphan Lily
1999	Sandwich
2000	Slapshock
2001	Itchyworms
2002	Boldstar
2003	Sugarfree
2004	Orange and Lemons
2005	Pedicab
2006	Up Dharma Down
2007	Hilera
2008	The Out of Body Special
2009	Peryodiko
2010	Tanya Markova

=== Artist of the Year ===
Year	Winner
1994	Afterimage
1995	Eraserheads
1996	Wolfgang
1997	Eraserheads
1998	Wolfgang
1999	Parokya ni Edgar
2000	Parokya ni Edgar
2001	Slapshock
2002	Slapshock
2003	Parokya ni Edgar
2004	Bamboo
2005	Orange and Lemons
2006	Kamikazee
2007	Bamboo
2008	Pupil
2009	Up Dharma Down
2010	Franco

=== Song of the Year ===
Year	Song	Artist
1994	"Your Love"	Alamid
1995	"Laklak"	Teeth
1996	"Ang Huling El Bimbo"	Eraserheads
1997	"Siesyatnebonsontneicostolim"	Sugar Hiccup
1998	"Don't Touch my Birdie"	Parokya ni Edgar
1999	"Butterfly Carnival"	Sandwich
2000	"Shooting Star"	Teeth
2001	"Motorbykle"	Cynthia Alexander
2002	"Paris"	Chicosci
2003	"Soul Searching"	Urbandub
2004	"Noypi"	Bamboo
2005	"Ako si M16"	Junior Kilat
2006	"Narda"	Kamikazee
2007	"Sala"	Pupil
2008	"Betamax"	Sandwich
2009	"Antukin"	Rico Blanco
2010	"This Gathering"	Franco

=== Album of the Year ===
Year	Album	Artist
1994	Ultraelectromagneticpop!	Eraserheads
1995	Circus	Eraserheads
1996	Cutterpillow	Eraserheads
1997	P.O.T.	P.O.T.
1998	The Jerks	The Jerks
1999	Grip Stand Throw Serve in Silence	Sandwich Wolfgang
2000	Free	Rivermaya
2001	4-Track Mind	Sandwich
2002	Pilipinas	Cheese
2003	Sa Wakas	Sugarfree
2004	Influence	Urbandub
2005	Light Peace Love	Bamboo
2006	Noontime Show	Itchyworms
2007	Moonlane Gardens	Orange and Lemons
2008	Wild Life	Pupil
2009	Bipolar	Up Dharma Down
2010	Franco	Franco

=== Best Live Act ===
Year	Winner
1994	The Dawn
1995	Put3ska
1996	Parokya ni Edgar
1997	Put3ska
2005	Kamikazee
2006	Kamikazee
2007	Bamboo
2008	Sandwich
2009	Hilera
2010	Tanya Markova

=== Listener's Choice ===
Year	Winner
1995	Eraserheads
1996	Wolfgang
1997	Eraserheads
1998	Wolfgang
1999	Wolfgang
2000	Slapshock
2001	Slapshock
2002	Cheese
2003	Kamikazee
2004	Bamboo
2005	Bamboo
2006	Kamikazee
2007	Bamboo
2008	Urbandub
2009	Chicosci
2010	Franco

=== Best Album Packaging ===
Year	Album	Artist
1995	Dekada	Ethnic Faces
1996	Bawal	Yano
1997	Fruitcake	Eraserheads
1998	Buruguduystunstugudunstuy	Parokya ni Edgar
1999	Serve in Silence	Wolfgang
2000	Revenge of the Giant Robot	Chicosci
2001	Three Fates	Rayyn
2002	Edgar Edgar Musikahan	Parokya ni Edgar
2003	Parnaso ng Payaso	Pan
2004	Novena	Slapshock
2005	Strike Whilst the Iron is Hot	Orange and Lemons
2006	Five on the Floor	Sandwich
2007	Moonlane Gardens	Orange and Lemons
2008	<S> Marks the Spot	Sandwich
2009	Mornings and Airports	Sugarfree
2010	Great Secret Show	Sleepwalk Circus

=== Vocalist Of The Year ===
Year	Winner	Artist
1995	Myra Ruaro	Put3ska
1996	Basti Artadi	Wolfgang
1997	Melody Del Mundo	Sugar Hiccup
1998	Basti Artadi	Wolfgang
1999	Basti Artadi	Wolfgang
2000	Basti Artadi	Wolfgang
2001	Aia De Leon	Imago
2002	Ian Tayao	Cheese
2003	Kevin Roy	Razorback
2004	Bamboo Mañalac	Bamboo
2005	Bamboo Mañalac	Bamboo
2006	Gabby Alipe	Urbandub
2007	Kat Agarrado	Sinosikat
2008	Rico Blanco	Rico Blanco
2009	Armi Millare, Ebe Dancel	Up Dharma Down, Sugarfree
2010	Gabby Alipe	Urbandub

=== Guitarist Of The Year ===
Year	Winner	Artist
1995	Manuel Legarda, Mike Villegas	Wolfgang, Rizal Underground
1996	Jun Lupito	Jun Lupito & The Bodhisattvas
1997	David Aguirre	Razorback
1998	Perf De Castro	TriAxis
1999	Tirso Ripoll	Razorback
2000	Michael Turner	Battery
2001	Manuel Legarda	Wolfgang
2002	Mong Alcaraz and Sonny Baquisal	Chicosci
2003	Ira Cruz	Kapatid
2004	Jerome Velasco	The Mongols
2005	Cynthia Alexander	Cynthia Alexander
2006	Mong Alcaraz	Chicosci & Sandwich
2007	Ira Cruz	Bamboo
2008	LC De Leon	Reklamo
2009	Kakoy Legaspi	Peryodiko
2010	Peavy "Sideshow" Nicolas & Fran Lorenzo	Sleepwalk Circus

=== Bassists Of The Year ===
Year	Winner	Artist
1995	Angelo Villegas	Rizal Underground
1996	Mon Legaspi	Wolfgang
1997	Mally Paraguya	P.O.T
1998	Louie Talan	Razorback
1999	Buhawi Meneses	Parokya ni Edgar
2000	Russell de la Cruz	Skychurch
2001	Lee Nadela	Slapshock
2002	Niño Avenido	Greyhoundz
2003	Rommel Dela Cruz	Barbie's Cradle
2004	Buddy Zabala	Cambio & Twisted Halo
2005	Niño Avenido	Greyhoundz
2006	Myrene Academia	Sandwich & Imago
2007	Nathan Azarcon	Bamboo
2008	Niño Avenido	The Out of Body Special
2009	Ivan Garcia	Hilera
2010	Lalay Lim	Urbandub

=== Drummer Of The Year ===
Year	Winner	Artist
1995	Harley Alarcon	Rizal Underground
1996	Wolf Gemora	Wolfgang
1997	Harley Alarcon	P.O.T
1998	Wolf Gemora	Wolfgang
1999	Raimund Marasigan	Eraserheads
2000	Mike Dizon	Teeth & Sandwich
2001	Zach Lucero	Imago
2002	Libyano	Badburn
2003	Allan Burdeos	Kamikazee
2004	Vic Mercado	Bamboo
2005	Jerros Dolino	Shiela and the Insects
2006	Jazz Nicolas	Itchyworms
2007	Vic Mercado, Mark Escueta	Bamboo, Rivermaya
2008	Wendell Garcia	Pupil
2009	Allan Burdeos	Kamikazee
2010	Otep Concepcion	Ozawa/In Love and War

=== Keyboardist of the Year ===
Year	Winner	Artist
1995	Arnold Cabalza	After Image
1996	Arnold Cabalza	After Image
1997	Bing Austria	Put3ska
2007	Dianne Santos	Pupil & Imago

=== Best Male ===
Year	Winner	Artist
2005	Yael Yuzon	Sponge Cola
2006	Mong Alcaraz	Sandwich & Chicosci

=== Best Female ===
Year	Winner	Artist
2005	Aia De Leon	Imago
2006	Armi Millare	Up Dharma Down

=== In The Raw Awards ===
Year	Winner
1998	Fatal Posporos
1999	Bad Burn
2000	Sonnet 58
2001	Twisted Halo
2002	Popular Days
2003	Narda
2004	The Late Isabel
2005	Up Dharma Down
2006	Silent Sanctuary
2007	Reklamo
2008	Bembol Rockers
2009	Dimmerswitch
2010	The Flying Ipis

=== Rising Sun Awards ===
Year	Winner
2004	Sponge Cola
2005	Orange & Lemons
2006	Itchyworms

anne curtis

=== Producer of the Year ===
Year	Winner	Work
1997	Robin Rivera	(for Eraserheads "Fruitcake")
1998	Robert Javier	(for "Parokya ni Edgar - Buruguduystunstugudunstuy, Erratics - In Stereo, Teeth - Time Machine")
1999	Maly Andres	(for Cheese "Cheese" album)
2000	Rico Blanco	(for Rivermaya "Free" & Teeth "I was a Teenage Tree")
2001	Louie Talan	(for Wolfgang "Acoustica")
2002	Raimund Marasigan	(for Monsterbot "Destroy, Destroy", Boldstar "Boldstar" & Chicosci "Method of Breathing")
2003	Barbie's Cradle & Angee Rozul	(for Barbie's Cradle "Playing in the Fields")
2004	Sandwich	(for Sandwich "Thanks to the Moon's Gravitational Pull")
2005	Cynthia Alexander & Angee Rozul	(for Cynthia Alexander "Comet's Tail")
2006	Raimund Marasigan, Buddy Zabala	(for The Itchyworms' Noontime Show)
2007	Lourd and Francis de Veyra	(for Radioactive Sago Project "Tangina Mo Ang Daming Nagugutom sa Mundo Fashionista Ka Pa Rin")
2008	Pupil & Jerome Velasco	(for Pupil “Wildlife”)
2009	Robin Rivera	(for Peryodiko "Peryodiko")
2010	Ely Buendia & Francis Magalona	(for Ely Buendia & Francis Magalona "In Love and War")

=== Music Video of the Year ===
Year	Winner	Work
1996	Eraserheads	"Ang Huling El Bimbo"
1997	Eraserheads	"Fruitcake"
1998	Joey Ayala	"Tabi Po"
1999	Razorback	"Voodoo, Who Do?"
2000	Slapshock	"Agent Orange"
2001	Barbie's Cradle	"Money For Food"
2002	The Pin Up Girls	"Down"
2003	7 Foot Junior	"Daisy"
2004	Radioactive Sago Project	"Astro"
2005	Imago	"Akap"
2006	Sandwich	"Sugod"
2007	Sandwich	"DVD-X"
2008	Pupil	"Monobloc"
2009	Bamboo	"Last Day on a Cruise Ship"
2010	Tanya Markova	"Disney"

=== Hall of Famer ===
Year	Winner
1994	Freddie Aguilar
1995	Joey "Pepe" Smith
1996	Mike Hanopol
1997	Sampaguita
1998	Club Dredd (Patrick Reidenbach)
1999	Edmund Fortuno
2000	Jingle Magazine
2001	Dante David aka "Howling Dave" of DZRJ's Pinoy Rock N' Rhythm
2002	Wally Gonzales
2003	Eraserheads
2004	The Jerks
2005	Mayric's
2006	DJs of the Rock of Manila (DZRJ)
2007	Angelo Villegas & Mike Villegas
2008	San Miguel Corporation
2009	Francis Magalona
2010	Angelo "Angie" Rozul

== See also ==
- NU 107
- Wish 107.5
- Wish 107.5 Music Awards
