= Artadi =

Artadi is a surname. Notable people with the surname include:

- Basti Artadi (born 1973), Filipino musician, songwriter, and actor
- Elsa Artadi (born 1976), Catalan economist, academic and politician
- Genevieve Artadi (born 1982), American singer-songwriter, musician, and video producer
- Paul Artadi (born 1981), Filipino politician and basketball coach
