= The Jerks =

Filipino rock band

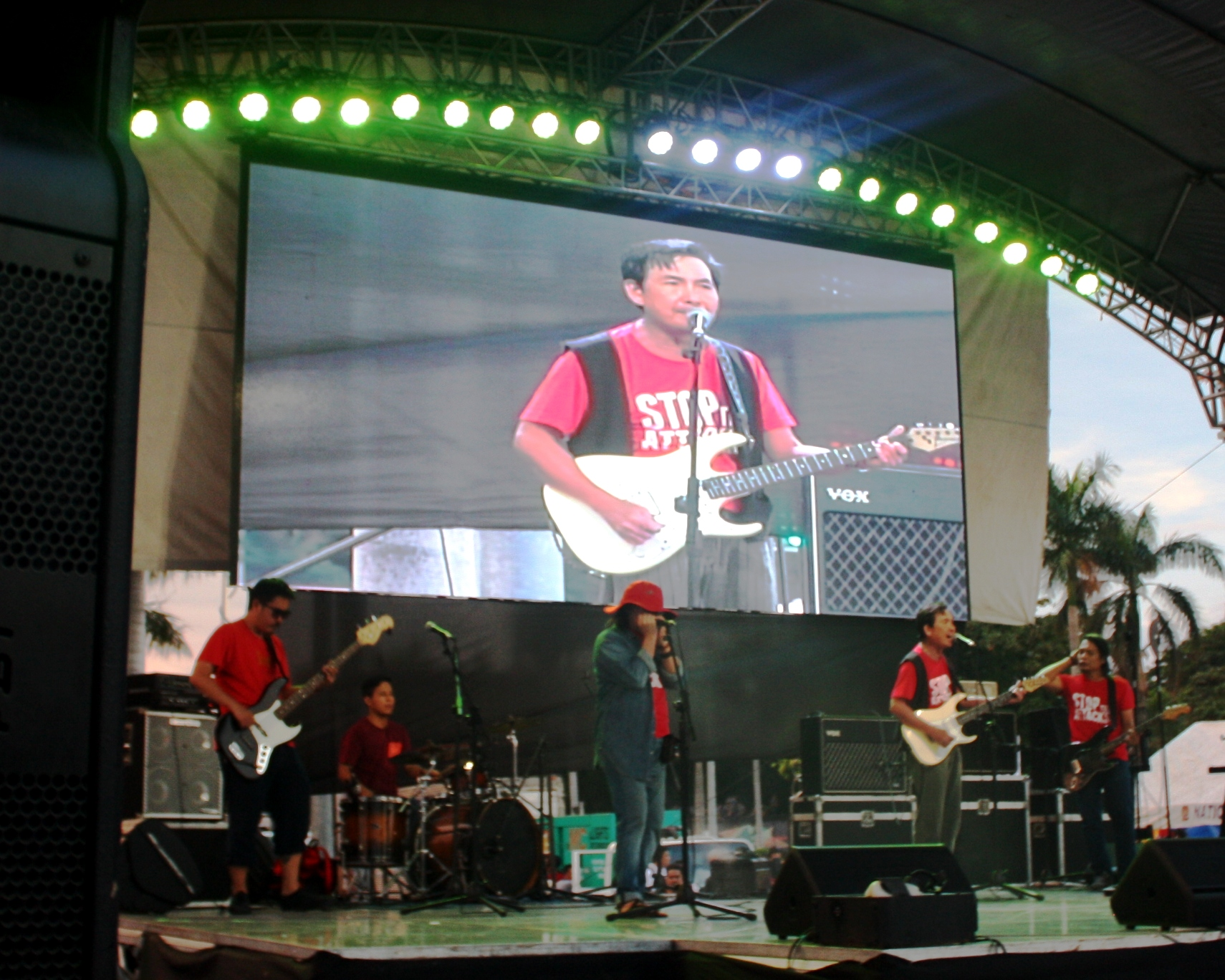
- Philippine rock band The Jerks performing at a stage in Luneta Park on September 21, 2018, during a Martial Law anniversary protest rally.

Background information
- Origin: Manila, Philippines
- Genres: Pinoy rock, punk rock, blues rock
- Years active: 1979–present
- Label: Star Music
- Members: Chikoy Pura; Benjie Santos; Paolo Manuel
- Past members: Jun Lopito (deceased); Angelo Villegas; Flor Mendoza (deceased); Paul Benitez; Jong Cablitas; Gils Dawag; Boy Matriano; Heli Umali; Rene Tengasantos; Brutus Lacano; Rey Abella; Nitoy Adriano; Pino Fernandez; Loy Biscaro; Edwin Aguilar

The Jerks is a rock band from the Philippines formed in 1979, and perhaps, is the original alternative rock and blues band in the country. The band has undergone a lot of member changes and notably a lot of the previous members of the band are now certified icons themselves in the music scene. Members like Chickoy Pura, Nitoy Adriano, Jun Lopito, Angelo Villegas, and others have carved names in their respective niches. Other performers who have played with the Jerks are former Put3ska drummer Brutus Lacano as a session musician, and drummer Benjie Santos.

Despite having been formed in 1979, they only released their debut record in 1994 entitled The Jerks Live, released under Gary Granada's Backdoor Records. It was recorded live at the legendary Mayric's bar and showcases the raw, passionate musicality of the band never before put into record. The Jerks also released a self-titled album in the late '90s.

By 1998, Star Music managed to convince the band to record a major label album called Haligi Ng Maynila, produced by ABS-CBN's Gabby Lopez, which gave the band the opportunity to reach a wider audience. This paved the way to the band winning the 1998 NU Rock Award for Best Album and the 1998 Katha Award for Best Rock Song, "Reklamo ng Reklamo".

On October 29, 2004, the band celebrated their 25th Anniversary at 70s Bistro. Musicians like Bayang Barrios, Cooky Chua, Angelo & Mike Villegas, Jun Lopito, Tots Tolentino, Acoustic Jive will join the anniversary.

The Jerks still perform regularly around Manila in bars like My Brother's Mustache Folk Bar near Timog Avenue, The 70s Bistro, Tiendesitas and Route 196 along Katipunan Extension.

In June 2022, the band released a seven-inch extended play, "The Jerks EP". Featuring three songs that date back to 1981 that were only played on radio and never released on any format and a reissue of "The Jerks Live" album on vinyl.

== Awards ==
Year	Award giving body	Category	Nominated work	Results
1998	"4th Katha Music Awards"	Best Rock Song	"Rage"	Won
1998	"4th Katha Music Awards"	Best Rock Performance by a Duo or Group with Vocal	"Rage" and "Tambol"	Nominated
1998	"Nu Rock Awards"	Album of the Year	"The Jerks"	Won
1998	"Nu Rock Awards"	Artist of the Year	—N/a	Nominated
2004	NU Rock Awards	Hall of Fame	—N/a	Won

Awards
Preceded by "P.O.T."; P.O.T.	NU Rock Awards; Album of the Year "The Jerks"; 1998	Succeeded by "Grip Stand Throw" & "Serve in Silence"; Sandwich (band) & Wolfgang
