= Mayric's =

Mayric's was a concert events venue in Manila that featured new and upcoming artists in the Philippine music scene since the early 80s. It helped launch the career of many Filipino artists or, at the least, served as a regular venues for their live performances. Those artists included The Dawn (band), Eraserheads, Half Life Half Death, The Jerks, Sandwich (band), Slapshock, Sugar Hiccup, Yano, and The Youth (band). Some journalists subsequently tagged the venue as "Where All the Great Bands Are Born."

In 2008, Mayric's closed down, after 25 years.

Independent concert producer and promoter Sazi Cosino opened Sazi's Music Bar afterwards in the same location. It eventually shut down operations on May 31, 2012, due to building management and renovation changes.
