= Banal Na Aso, Santong Kabayo =

1994 song by Yano

Song by Yano

from the album Yano
- Released: June 30, 1994
- Recorded: 1994
- Genre: Pinoy rock, punk rock, folk punk
- Length: 4:28
- Label: Alpha Records; BMG Records (Pilipinas) Inc.
- Songwriter: Westdon Abay
- Producer: Rudy Y. Tee

"Banal Na Aso, Santong Kabayo" (lit. 'Holy Dog, Saintly Horse') is a song by the Filipino punk rock band Yano. It was released on June 30, 1994 as part of the band's self-titled debut album.

== Background ==
In an interview with guitarist Eric Gancio, he claimed that the song was based on a true story where frontman Dong Abay encountered an old woman praying the Rosary on board a jeepney. Gancio also explained that the second stanza was a fictional account but it stayed within the theme of religious hypocrisy. The song garnered controversy for its perceived criticism of religion especially in light of the country's predominantly Christian population, and was also the subject of backwards masking claims by religious groups in an episode of the Noli de Castro news magazine programme Magandang Gabi, Bayan.

The song was later parodied by Parokya ni Edgar as "Chikinini". Gancio recalled how he was flattered by Parokya's parody, initially wishing that they produced original content instead of just parodies but later spoke positively about their original compositions in their own right.

== Composition ==
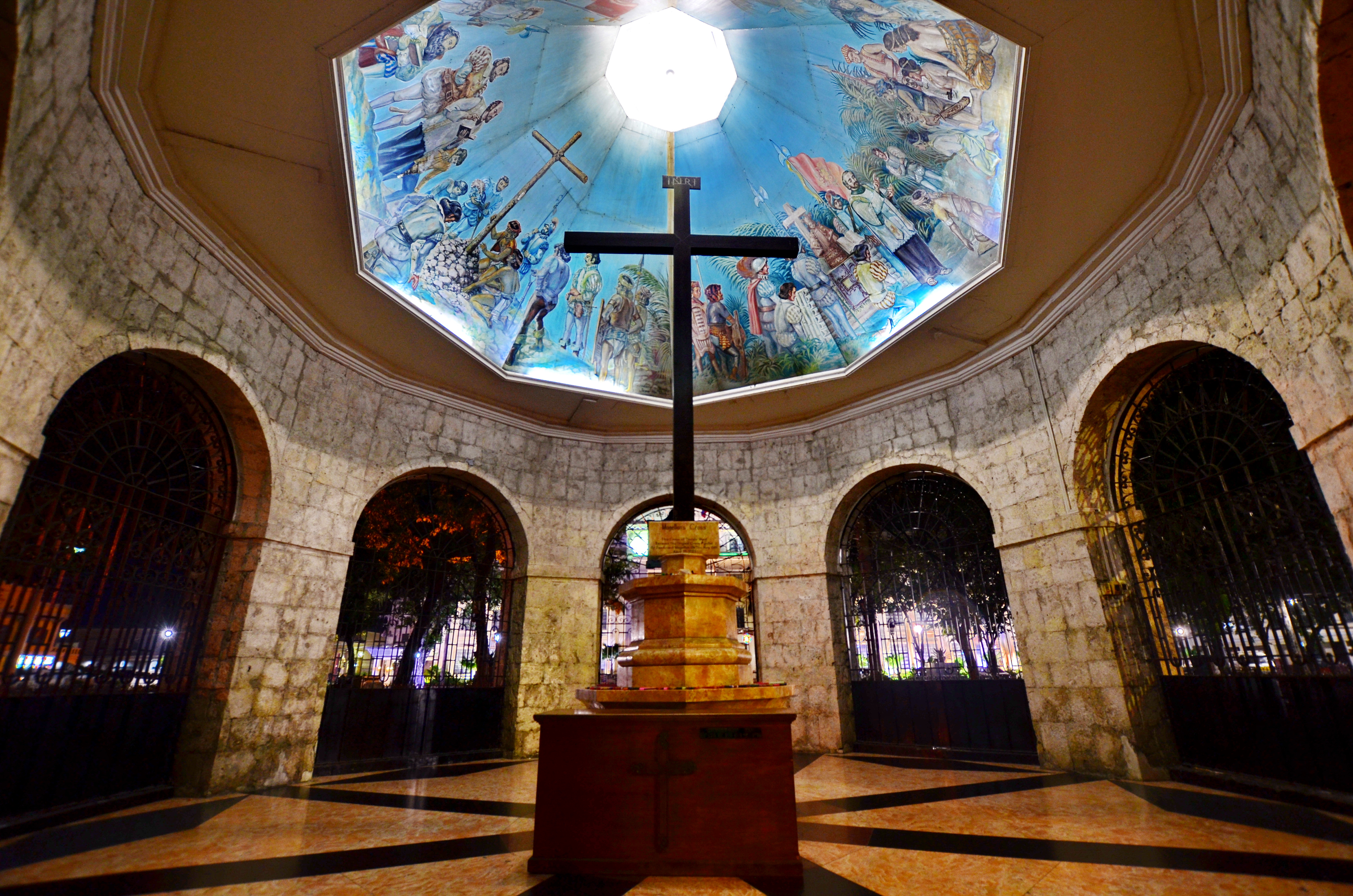
The Philippines is known throughout Asia as one of the few predominantly Christian countries in the region. The song generated controversy from religious groups for perceived blasphemy, though the band maintained that it was not intended to be an attack on anyone's faith.

The song is a blunt indictment of religious hypocrisy exhibited by supposedly devout Christians in the country. The first verse tells that of an old lady fervently praying the Rosary while on board a jeepney, only for her to launch a profane tirade when the driver apologetically refused to stop at a no-parking zone. The second and final verse recounts a preacher who meets a destitute child desperately begging for alms. The preacher refused to give the child money, reasoning that the proceeds are "for the temple", but as the child continued to plead for money to be spent on food, the preacher ignored them and moved to another spot. The bridge before the final repetition of the chorus is a paraphrase of Matthew 25:40: Ano man ang iyong ginagawa sa iyong kapatid / Ay siya ring ginagawa mo sa akin. (Whatever you do to your brethren, you also do to me.)
