= The Oktaves (album) =

2013 studio album

Studio album by the Oktaves
- Released: February 22, 2013
- Genre: Rock; country; blues; rockabilly
- Length: 46:49
- Label: MCA Music
- Producer: Ely Buendia; Robert Javier

Singles from The Oktaves
- 1. "K.U.P.A.L." Released: November 2012; 2. "Paakyat Ka Pa Lang, Pababa Na Ako" Released: November 2013; 3. "Ikot" Released: October 2014

The Oktaves is the only album by the Filipino rock supergroup the Oktaves, released on February 22, 2013, by MCA Music. It features Eraserheads and Pupil vocalist Ely Buendia, The Jerks guitarist Nitoy Adriano, and Hilera members Chris Padilla (vocals, guitars), Bobby Padilla (drums), and Ivan Garcia (bass).

== Background ==
Buendia previously collaborated with Hilera on the 2010 album In Love and War, a collaboration with the late rapper Francis M. In 2011, Buendia and Adriano collaborated on the song “Bungo sa Bangin” as part of Rock Rizal, a music project by Rock Ed Philippines commemorating Jose Rizal’s 150th birth anniversary. Buendia and Hilera also contributed a Tagalog rendition of "La Paloma" as the theme song to the 2011 film Manila Kingpin: The Asiong Salonga Story.

Buendia, Adriano, and the members of Hilera first performed as The Oktaves at the inaugural ball of the Philippine edition of Esquire magazine in 2012. They later signed a recording contract with MCA Music in October.

== Release ==
The band launched the album at a mall show, where it was sold as a bundle with a limited edition T-shirt and a poster; those who bought a bundle had a meet and greet with the members.

The music video for "Ikot" was directed by Buendia and was released in October 2014. It features Ellen Adarna performing a lap dance on Chris Padilla, who performed the song.

== Track listing ==
No.	Title	Writer(s)	Length
1.	"Gone Gone Gone"	Ely Buendia	3:24
2.	"Hold On Tight"	Chris Padilla	2:34
3.	"K.U.P.A.L."	Buendia	3:29
4.	"Walang Magawa"	Padilla	3:49
5.	"Olivia"	Buendia	4:43
6.	"Get You"	Padilla	4:36
7.	"Paakyat Ka Pa Lang Pababa Na Ako"	Buendia	3:44
8.	"Ikot"	Padilla	4:21
9.	"Detox"	Buendia	2:51
10.	"Standing On My Own"	Padilla	3:51
11.	"Bungo Sa Bangin"	Buendia	5:18
12.	"Langit Express"	Buendia	4:09
Total length:			44:35

== Personnel ==
=== The Oktaves ===
- Ely Buendia – vocals, guitars
- Nitoy Adriano – lead guitars
- Chris Padilla – vocals, guitars
- Ivan Garcia – bass
- Bobby Padilla – drums

=== Production ===
- Ely Buendia – producer
- Robert Javier – producer
