= Tipong Pinoy =

Philippine television infotainment show

- Genre: Infotainment
- Written by: Rene Villanueva
- Directed by: Joey Romero
- Presented by: Susan Calo-Medina; Wency Cornejo; Janelle So; Alfred Vargas
- Country of origin: Philippines
- Original language: Tagalog

Production
- Running time: 30 minutes
- Production company: National Commission for Culture and the Arts

Original release
- Network: GMA Network (1998–99); Studio 23 (2003–04)
- Release: 1998 – 2004

Tipong Pinoy (transl. Filipino type) is a Philippine television infotainment show broadcast by GMA Network from 1998 to 1999 and Studio 23 from 2003 to 2004. It was produced by the National Commission for Culture and the Arts (NCCA).

It is a 30-minute youth-orientated magazine-style show which features different aspects of both traditional and contemporary Filipino culture such as food, pop culture, beliefs and arts. Wency Cornejo and the late Susan Calo-Medina were the show's presenters. When the show was revived on Studio 23, Jannelle So and Alfred Vargas were chosen as its hosts.

== Hosts ==
GMA Network

- Susan Calo-Medina
- Wency Cornejo

Studio 23

- Jannelle So
- Alfred Vargas
