= The Oktaves =

Filipino rock band

- Origin: Metro Manila, Philippines
- Genres: Rock; country music; blues; rockabilly
- Years active: 2011–2014 (on hiatus)
- Labels: MCA Music, Inc.
- Spinoff of: Eraserheads; Pupil; The Jerks; Hilera
- Past members: Ely Buendia; Nitoy Adriano; Chris Padilla; Ivan Garcia; Bobby Padilla

The Oktaves were a Filipino rock supergroup comprising Eraserheads and Pupil vocalist Ely Buendia (vocals), The Jerks guitarist Nitoy Adriano, and Hilera members Chris Padilla (vocals, guitars), Bobby Padilla (drums), and Ivan Garcia (bass). Formed in 2011, The Oktaves released a self-titled album in 2013.

== History ==
=== 2010-2012: Collaborations and formation ===
Buendia had previously collaborated with Hilera on the 2010 album In Love and War, a collaboration with the late rapper Francis M. In 2011, Buendia and Adriano collaborated on the song “Bungo sa Bangin” as part of Rock Rizal, a project by Rock Ed Philippines to commemorate Jose Rizal’s 150th birth anniversary. Buendia and Hilera also contributed a Tagalog rendition of "La Paloma" as the theme song to the 2011 film Manila Kingpin: The Asiong Salonga Story.

Buendia, Adriano, and the members of Hilera first performed as The Oktaves at the inaugural ball of the Philippine edition of Esquire magazine in 2012. Their live set included covers of Eraserheads, the Beatles, the Smiths, Elvis, and Bob Dylan. They later signed a recording contract with MCA Music in October.

=== 2013: The Oktaves ===
The band released a self-titled album in 2013, featuring lead single "K.U.P.A.L." and a re-recorded version of "Bungo sa Bangin".

== Members ==
- Ely Buendia - vocals, guitars
- Nitoy Adriano - lead guitars
- Chris Padilla - vocals, guitars
- Ivan Garcia - bass
- Bobby Padilla - drums

== Discography ==
=== Studio albums ===
Title	Album details
The Oktaves	Released: February 22, 2013; Label: MCA Music; Format: CD, download

=== Music videos ===
Year	Title	Director
2013	"Paakyat Ka Pa Lang, Pababa Na Ako"	Ely Buendia and Neil De La Cruz
2014	"Ikot"	Ely Buendia

== Awards and nominations ==
=== Awit Awards ===
Year	Nominee / work	Award	Result
2013	"KPL"	Best Rock/Alternative Recording	Nominated
2013	"KPL"	Best Performance by a New Group Recording Artists	Nominated

=== MYX Music Awards ===
Year	Nominee / work	Award	Result
2015	"Ikot"	Favorite Rock Video	Nominated
