= Razorback (band) =

Filipino hard rock band

- Origin: Manila, Philippines
- Genres: Heavy metal; hard rock; Pinoy rock
- Years active: 1990–present
- Labels: Hebigat Sounds Inc; Sony BMG; Alpha Music
- Members: Tirso Ripoll; Manuel Legarda; Kevin Roy; Marco Cuneta
- Past members: Jose Mari Cuervo; Miguel Ortigas; David Aguirre; Louie Talan; Brian Velasco

Razorback is a Filipino hard rock band formed in 1990. Originally known for being regulars at the now-defunct Kalye, a club in Makati, the band has performed at full-scale concerts and opened for Silverchair, Rage Against the Machine and Metallica.

== History ==
Razorback first began performing covers of bands such as Led Zeppelin, Juan de la Cruz Band, Black Sabbath and Iron Maiden. The group was put together by drummer Miguel Ortigas and guitarists Tirso Ripoll and David Aguirre.

In 1982, Miguel Ortigas met Tirso Ripoll through the latter's cousin in La Salle Green Hills. Ortigas first handled guitars then later moved on to drums. Ortigas also studied in Yamaha School of Music, under Benjie Zialcita, who also taught Tirso Ripoll, Louie Talan and David Aguirre. It was in 1988, when they would usually watch their idols Pepe Smith, Sampaguita, Edmund Fortuno, and many others, in Electra Bar, Makati, where they decided to create something better.

One of their first songs was "Highway to Hell" by AC/DC, and with only Tirso, Miguel and David in the line-up, they first recruited Tirso's brother, Junus as bassist and Isabel Lozano as vocalist. During their formative years, the band was known as 'Outrider', with their first gig at Big Bang, Alabang. The group later joined Upsilon Sigma Phi-NU107's Battle of the Bands and won. From here on out, the band as 'Razorback' was officially formed and played regularly in local bars such as Kalye, Club Dredd and Peligro.

Members of Razorback and Wolfgang used to jam onstage billed as the 'Flaming Hemorrhoids'. Five years later, the band, original vocalist Jose Mari Cuervo was replaced by Kevin Roy on vocals, alongside Ripoll and Aguirre on guitars, Ortigas on drums and Louie Talan on bass, released their debut album entitled Hebigat Sounds Volume One. ('Hebigat' is a portmanteau, created by fusing the words 'Hebi', a play on the English word 'heavy', and the Filipino word 'bigat', literally, 'heavy'.) The album contained such tracks as "Giyang", "Tabi ng Bulkan" ("Beside the Volcano") and "Pepe D' Hepe".

On November 4, 1994 the band along with Alamid opened for the American Rock Band supergroup Mr. Big at their concert at the Folk Arts Theater.

David Aguirre is now the lead guitarist for the Southern California-based band 3 Headed Dog. Manuel Legarda, also of Wolfgang, has taken over his guitar duties for Razorback. Brian Velasco, who was a drum instructor at RJ Guitar Center, later joined and replaced Miguel Ortigas on drums.

== Beggar's Moon ==
Founding member Miguel Ortigas soon decided to leave the band in March 1996, prompting the band to take on Brian Velasco. In 1997, the band released their second album entitled Beggar's Moon under Epic Records. It produced hits such as "Payaso" ("Clown") and "Ikot Ng Mundo" ("Turning of the World"), the latter garnering an NU 107 Rock Awards 'Song of The Year' nomination that year. Aguirre won 'Best Guitarist of the Year'; Talan won the 'Best Bassist' the following year. Beggar's Moon eventually went platinum.

One track off the Beggar's Moon album is entitled "Of Hobbits and Pipeweed"; perhaps a homage to J. R. R. Tolkien and his books The Hobbit and The Lord of the Rings. The track "Lunatic" featured the Filipino violinist John Lesaca and percussionist Denise Celdran

Basti Artadi of Wolfgang shares credit for work done on the Beggar's Moon album art. According to Tirso Ripoll in his podcast with Basti Artadi, Tropical Banter, Beggar's Moon can be played over Blade Runner in synchronicity, similar to Pink Floyd's The Dark Side of the Moon played over The Wizard of Oz.

On July 19, 1997, the band along with Wolfgang opened for the American rock band Rage Against the Machine in their concert at the Cuneta Astrodome, Manila.

== Star ==
The third Razorback album, Star, was released in 1998. The album produced the award-winning video hit "Voodoo, Who Do?", plus other favorites such as "Tikman ang Ulan" ("Taste the Rain"), "Pag-hihintay" ("The Waiting"), and "Sa Gitna Ng Lahat" ("In the Midst of it All"). "Voodoo, Who Do?" would later on become part of the soundtrack of Stone, a comic book by Filipino artist Whilce Portacio - along with tracks by such artists as Korn, Our Lady Peace, Incubus, as well as Filipino artists Chill and Wolfgang.

Some time after Star was released (whose carrier single had Basti Artadi voicing the intro), David Aguirre went on hiatus, prompting some speculation that he was quitting the band for good. He returned in late 2000.

== 2000s ==
In 2003, the band embarked on an ambitious project - an eponymously titled double CD album. Razorback dispelled rumours that this was their final album. The album starts out with "Minsan Lang" ("Not Often"). Diversity was evident, with songs ranging from classic rock, ("Minsan Lang", "Wakasan" ("End It"), "Dagat ng Pag-asa" ("Sea of Hope"), to Pink Floydesque tracks ("Puerto Jam", "Earthen Drum") and acoustic love songs ("Ditty", "Sixteen Days").

David Aguirre effectively left the band around 2003, after accepting an invitation by Wolf Gemora (formerly of Wolfgang) to play guitar for his new Southern California-based band, Lokomotiv.

On January 6 and January 12, 2007, various members of Razorback and Wolfgang got together for a reunion concert at the Music Museum. On hand were Basti Artadi, Tirso Ripoll, Louie Talan, Kevin Roy, Mon Legaspi, Brian Velasco, Miguel Ortigas and Manuel Legarda. Wolf Gemora and David Aguirre, however, were unable to join this gig, as their commitments for the moment lie with Lokomotiv.

== 2010s–present ==
They released their first studio album in six years, entitled Three Minutes of Glory. The songs "Daan-Daang Dahilan", "Ayon sa Kanya", and "Atin-Atin Lang" from this album are staples at their live performances. As of 2011, the band frequently tours the Philippines and Asia most recently as part of the San Miguel Red Horse Beer Muziklaban events.

To commemorate the band's 25th anniversary in 2015, the band released an acoustic album “Acoustic Ng Ina Mo”, which included new songs as well as acoustic versions of their previous songs.

On June 10, 2018, the Razorback Facebook page announced the departure of its singer, Kevin Roy, with the statement: "We regret to announce that, due to circumstances beyond our control, we have parted ways with our singer and brother, Kevin Roy. We wish him luck in his future endeavors. Razorback will forge ahead and give you Boars the Rakenrol you deserve. See you in the shows to come." After Kevin Roy's departure from the band, Nicole Asensio and Kat Agarrado (on vocals) and Ira Cruz (on guitars) were featured in the band's lineup. Razorback also released a single featuring Basti Artadi, titled “Stargazer”.

On January 16, 2019, drummer Brian Velasco died by jumping from the balcony of a condominium in Malate, Manila, while filming it on video. His girlfriend stated that he had bipolar disorder and was under treatment for that.

In 2019, Razorback released a single featuring Dong Abay on vocals entitled "Palasyo". According to the band's twitter post on May 8, 2019, this was the last song they recorded with their late drummer Brian Velasco. They released another single with in 2019 entitled "Love Pusher" featuring Nino Mendoza on vocals. The band recruited Francis Aquino of Wolfgang to be their drummer.

In 2020, Razorback released another singled called "Bubog sa Aspalto" featuring Raymund Marasigan on vocals. also on the same year, On October 30 The band celebrated their 30th anniversary with a special livestream concert on the band's official Facebook page that lasted close to two hours. The band performed their hits in an empty studio with the current line up. and includes former members Kevin Roy, Miguel Ortigas and David Aguirre.

In an interview with Perf De Castro's PERFTalk series, Ripoll confirmed that Kevin Roy has returned as the band's vocalist in 2021.

== Band members ==
=== Current ===
- Tirso Ripoll
- Manuel Legarda
- Francis Aquino
- Kevin Roy
- Marco Cuneta

== Discography ==
- Hebigat Sounds Volume One - 1995
- Beggar's Moon - 1997
- Star - 1998
- Soundcheck: The Live Recordings - 2000
- Razorback - 2002
- D' Greytest Hithits - 2004
- ALIVE 2007 - 2009
- Three Minutes of Glory - 2011
- Acoustic ng Ina Mo - 2015

== Awards ==
Year	Award giving body	Category	Nominated work	Results
1997	NU Rock Awards	Guitarists of the Year	(for David Aguirre)	Won
1998	"4th Katha Music Awards"	Best Rock Song	"Payaso"	Nominated
1998	"4th Katha Music Awards"	Best Rock Album	"Beggar's Moon"	Nominated
1998	NU Rock Awards	Bassist of the Year	(for Louie Talan)	Won
1998	NU Rock Awards	Artist of the Year	—N/a	Nominated
1998	NU Rock Awards	Song of the Year	"Ikot Ng Mundo"	Nominated
1998	NU Rock Awards	Vocalist of the Year	(for Kevin Roy)	Nominated
1998	NU Rock Awards	Guitarist of the Year	(for Tirso Ripoll & David Aguirre)	Nominated
1998	NU Rock Awards	Drummer of the Year	(for Bryan Velasco)	Nominated
1998	11th Awit Awards	Best Rock Recording	"Munting Paraiso"	Won
1999	MTV Philippines Music Awards	Favorite Group Video	"Voodoo Who Do"	Nominated
1999	12th Awit Awards	Music Video of the Year	"Voodoo Who Do"	Won
1999	12th Awit Awards	Music Video Performance of the Year	"Voodoo Who Do"	Won
1999	12th Awit Awards	Music Video Director of the Year	Matthew Rosen (for Voodoo Who Do)	Won
1999	12th Awit Awards	Music Video Producer of the Year	Lorena Rosen (for Voodoo Who Do)	Won
1999	NU Rock Awards	Rock Video of the Year	"Voodoo Who Do"	Won
1999	NU Rock Awards	Guitarists of the Year	(for Tirso Ripoll)	Won
2002	8th Katha Awards	Best Rock Song	Kevin Roy & Cookie Chua for "Jam"	Won
2002	8th Katha Awards	Best Rock Song Vocal Performance	Kevin Roy & Cookie Chua for "Jam"	Won
2003	NU Rock Awards	Vocalist of the Year	(for Kevin Roy)	Won
2003	NU Rock Awards	Song of the Year	"Wakasan"	Nominated
2003	NU Rock Awards	Artist of the Year	—N/a	Nominated
2003	NU Rock Awards	Album of the Year	"Razorback"	Nominated
2003	NU Rock Awards	Best Album Packaging	"Razorback"	Nominated
2003	NU Rock Awards	Producer of the Year	(Louie Talan & Razorback for "Razorback" album)	Nominated
2003	NU Rock Awards	Guitarist of the Year	(for Tirso Ripoll & David Aguirre)	Nominated
2003	NU Rock Awards	Bassist of the Year	(for Louie Talan)	Nominated
2003	NU Rock Awards	Drummer of the Year	(for Brian Velasco)	Nominated

== See also ==
- Pinoy rock
- Wolfgang (Filipino band)
