= Acoustica (Wolfgang album) =

Live album by Wolfgang
- Released: November 2000
- Recorded: 30 September 2000
- Venue: Music Museum, Greenhills, San Juan, Manila
- Genre: Pinoy rock; acoustic
- Label: Sony Music Entertainment
- Producer: Louie Talan

Wolfgang chronology
Serve in Silence (1999)	Acoustica (2000)	Black Mantra (2001)

Professional ratings
Review scores
Source	Rating
AllMusic	4.5/5 stars

Acoustica is the first live album by Filipino rock band Wolfgang, released in November 2000. The album was recorded on 30 September 2000 at the Music Museum in Greenhills, San Juan, Manila.

== Track listing ==
No.	Title	Length
1.	"Center of the Sun"	4:08
2.	"Bought and Sold"	5:14
3.	"24"	6:24
4.	"Left Alone"	6:40
5.	"Anino"	6:53
6.	"Atomica"	5:25
7.	"Revenge of the Killer Falafel/Hell Looks"	8:27
8.	"Matter of Time"	4:12
9.	"She Is My Cain"	4:15
10.	"Cast of Clowns"	4:51
11.	"Halik Ni Hudas"	9:37
12.	"Aquarius"	6:48

== Personnel ==
Wolfgang

- Sebastian "Basti" Artadi – vocals
- Manuel Legarda – 6 and 12-string acoustic guitar
- Ramon "Mon" Legaspi – bass
- Leslie "Wolf" Gemora – drums

Guest musicians

- David Aguirre – second acoustic guitar
- Paul Zialcita – percussion
- Martin Jamora – keyboards
- Radha Cuadrado – vocals ("Matter of Time" and "Aquarius")
- UP Singing Ambassadors – vocals ("Center of the Sun" and "Aquarius")
