= Villains (Wolfgang album) =

Studio album by Wolfgang
- Released: 10 December 2008
- Studio: HIT Productions
- Genres: Alternative metal; hard rock
- Label: Semenelin Music
- Producer: Manuel Legarda

Wolfgang chronology
Black Mantra (2001)	Villains (2008)	Ang Bagong Dugo Sa Lumang Ugat - Unang Kabanata (2012)

Singles from Villains
- 1. "RP Deathsquad" Released: 16 April 2007; 2. "Ibrahim" Released: 3 November 2008; 3. "John Of The Cross" Released: 13 November 2008; 4. "Novus Is Burning" Released: 18 November 2008

Villains is the sixth studio album by Filipino rock band Wolfgang, released on 10 December 2008. This was the band's first album since 2001's Black Mantra and the first album without original drummer Wolf Gemora.

== Track listing ==
No.	Title	Length
1.	"RP Deathsquad"	3:33
2.	"Ibrahim"	3:31
3.	"N.M.E."	4:01
4.	"Soap"	3:09
5.	Untitled (Hidden Track)	0:38
6.	"John of the Cross"	4:12
7.	"Kung Gusto Mo Pa?"	3:33
8.	"Diaspora Mama"	5:17
9.	"The Shaft"	2:57
10.	"Novus Is Burning"	3:25
11.	"Ladies & Gentlemen"	1:56

== Personnel ==
- Sebastian "Basti" Artadi – vocals
- Manuel Legarda – guitar
- Ramon "Mon" Legaspi – bass
- Francis Aquino – drums

== See also ==
- Pinoy rock
- Razorback (band)
