= Bawal (album) =

Studio album by Yano
- Released: August 10, 1996
- Genre: Alternative rock, punk rock
- Label: Alpha Records
- Producer: Rudy Y. Tee

Yano chronology
Yano (1994)	Bawal (1996)	Tara (1997)

Professional ratings
Review scores
Source	Rating
Allmusic	2.5/5 stars

Bawal is the second album of the Filipino rock band, Yano. It has 10 tracks and released under Alpha Records on August 10, 1996.

== Track listing ==
1. "Metro" – 2:25
2. "Dayo" (Foreigner) – 4:15
3. "Askal" (Filipino wordplay for "Asong Kalye", literally means Street Dog) – 3:25
4. "Bawal" (Prohibited) – 3:48
5. "Lahat" (All/Everybody) – 4:58
6. "Ate" (Big Sister) – 2:59
7. "Astig" (Filipino slang for Cool) – 3:08
8. "Sana" (I Wish) – 5:07
9. "Diosdiosan" (Fake God) – 3:10
10. "Pyutcha" (Filipino slang for Son of a Bitch) – 4:23

== Personnel ==
- Dong Abay – lead vocals
- Eric Gancio – guitar, backing vocals
- Onie Badiang – bass, backing vocal
- Nowie Favila – drums & percussion
