= Wolfgang (band) =

Filipino rock band

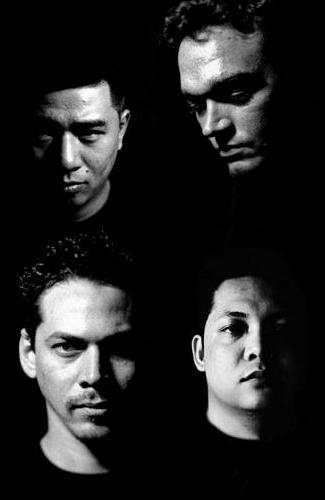
- Wolfgang in 2009, L–R, T–B: Mon Legaspi, Basti Artadi, Manuel Legarda, Francis Aquino

Background information
- Origin: Manila, Philippines
- Genres: Heavy metal; grunge; hard rock; Pinoy rock
- Years active: 1992–2002, 2007–present
- Labels: Ivory Music; Sony BMG; Semenelin Music
- Spinoffs: Lokomotiv
- Members: Basti Artadi; Manuel Legarda; Francis Aquino
- Past members: Leslie Gemora; Mon Legaspi

Wolfgang is a Filipino rock band formed in January 1992 in Manila. The group is notable for being the only Filipino rock band to release albums in both Japan and the United States and for realizing Platinum record sales in their home country. After ten years, the original lineup split in 2002. Wolfgang reformed in 2007 with a new drummer.

== History ==
Vocalist Basti Artadi (born Sebastian Artadi) and drummer Wolf Gemora (born Leslie Gemora) began their musical careers with other local bands, while guitarist Manuel Legarda returned to the Philippines from living in Spain. Gemora was inspired to form a band upon frequenting shows by the rock group Razorback. He invited Legarda to join him and eventually, the two found Basti Artadi singing with his band, Sin City. Upon Legarda's invitation, Artadi joined the duo. In their first few months, the group went through a number of bass players. They eventually met Mon Legaspi, who became their permanent bassist. They initially dubbed themselves the Wolfpack and later adopted the name Wolfgang, upon the suggestion of David Aguirre, one of the guitarists of Razorback. They began to play live gigs at Weekends Live! at the Atrium and the now-defunct Kalye Bar in Makati. Their first big break came when they were invited to perform on Channel 29's RJ Junior Jam.

=== Debut album ===
Wolfgang submitted demos of two original compositions, "Darkness Fell" and "Left Alone", to local radio stations DWRT 99.5 and DWLA 105.9 in 1994, which generated many listener requests. The band signed with Tone Def, the rock label of local independent Ivory Records. They released their first album, the eponymous Wolfgang, in 1995. The group flexed their artistic skills making the record, with Artadi responsible for the cover art, rendering caricatures of himself and the other band members amidst earthy symbols, beer bottles, and cigarettes, and Legarda using an electric fan to simulate an effect he had in mind for the song "Cast of Clowns". Wolfgang went Platinum in less than a year and got regular airplay on DWLA 105.9 and DWNU 107.5.

At the 1995 NU107 Rock Awards, Manuel Legarda won the Guitarist of the Year award (tied with Mike Villegas of Rizal Underground).

=== Semenelin ===
On June 15, 1996, Wolfgang left Tone Def and signed with a major label, Epic Records, under Sony Music Entertainment Philippines (SMEP).

The band won many awards at the 1996 NU107 Rock Awards, where Artadi won Vocalist of the Year, Gemora took the Drummer of the Year award, Legaspi won Bassist of the Year, and the band won Artist of the Year and Listener's Choice Award.

Semenelin was released in the United States in an all-English language edition in March 1997, as two songs were originally recorded in Filipino.

=== Wurm ===
The band's next album, Wurm, was issued on December 12, 1997. It reached Platinum status (40,000 albums sold). The lower sales figure, however, did nothing to diminish the standard set by Wurm, which was nominated at the 1998 NU107 Rock Awards for Album of the Year. That year also saw Artadi winning his second Vocalist of the Year award, Gemora winning his second Drummer of the Year title. Wolfgang also took honors for Listener's Choice and Artist of the Year.

Wurm, which was recorded entirely in English, was released in early 1998 in Japan, and Wolfgang performed several shows in Osaka and Tokyo to promote the album.

=== Serve in Silence ===
Wolfgang's fourth album, Serve in Silence, was released locally on March 21, 1999. Though another critical and commercial success, it did not see international release.

The band won four awards at the 1999 NU Rock Awards, and the record tied for first place in the Album of the Year category with Sandwich's Grip Stand Throw. Serve in Silence also won Best Album Packaging, and Artadi was again honored as Vocalist of the Year, his third overall win in that category. Wolfgang additionally scored the Artist of the Year and Listener's Choice awards.

=== Black Mantra ===
Wolfgang's fifth record, Black Mantra, a double album, was released on August 4, 2001, prior to their breakup in 2002. The album also contained singles that became certified hits, including "Bow Unto Thee" and "Idlip". The track "No Falter" was used in the 2001 movie Final Fantasy: The Spirits Within. In 2002, the band released a music video for their next single, "Meckam", directed by Raymond Red.

=== Years prior to hiatus ===
In February 2000, the live album Soundcheck: The Live Recordings, featuring Wolfgang and three other rock bands signed to Sony Music Entertainment Philippines, was released. At the 2000 NU107 Rock Awards, all four musicians scored nominations in their respective categories, and Artadi won his fourth title. In late 2000, Wolfgang released a live concert album, Acoustica, on which previously recorded songs were played in an acoustic manner. It included guest artists David Aguirre of Razorback, Radha Cuadrado, and UP Singing Ambassadors. The record reached Gold status. In 2001, the band announced an upcoming US tour.

On April 1, 2001, Volume, a compilation of material culled from the band's first four studio albums, was released in Australia and in Tower Records stores in the US. Artadi's participation in a side project with members of labelmate Razorback culminated in the release on July 14, 2001, of an acoustic rock album titled Brain Salad, which was reissued on vinyl in 2022.

=== Post-hiatus activities ===
After Wolfgang broke up in 2002, Legaspi took over bass duties from Carlos Balcells of The Dawn, staying with the band from 2003 until 2005. Gemora was part of the southern California-based rock quartet Lokomotiv, while Artadi became the vocalist for a San Francisco-based group called Kitaan. He later sang for Lokomotiv on their debut album, Rock N' Roll Death Toll. He left the group shortly after and was replaced by Ryan Hudson. Artadi later worked as a coordinator for the corporate operations department of Gap in San Francisco. Legarda formed the band DRT with former Gnash vocalist Jay Ortega, Blue Rats drummer Miguel Ortigas, and bassist Paolo Pacia. Legarda has since left the group and been replaced by Daniel Crilosogo of DC Aftershock. Lokomotiv dissolved in 2007. Gemora went on to play in the band 3 Headed Dog with ex-Razorback guitarist David Aguirre and Lokomotiv bassist Danny Gonzalez.

=== Reunion and new album ===
With members of Razorback and Wolfgang used to jamming onstage as the Flaming Hemorrhoids, it was not a surprise when in January 2007, members of both groups got together for a reunion concert at the Music Museum. On hand were Basti Artadi, Tirso Ripoll, Louie Talan, Kevin Roy, Mon Legaspi, Brian Velasco, Miguel Ortigas, and Manuel Legarda, as well as Francis Aquino, who would go on to become Wolfgang's new drummer. Wolf Gemora and David Aguirre, however, were unable to join, as their commitments at the time were with Lokomotiv.

During the gig, Wolfgang played an all-new song and Artadi made a comment about working on a fresh album. The first single from this record, "Deathsquad", hit the airwaves via local rock radio station NU 107 on April 16, 2007. The new album was unique in that digital technology was used for the band members to exchange recorded parts online, since most of them were based overseas. In an interview with Yahoo! Philippines, Artadi was quoted as saying that "Wolfgang never did break up", and circumstances simply led to the band members going along different paths. However, they "always left the door open so that if ever the opportunity arose and we could get some work together, then sure, why not?"

=== Villains ===
After a six-year hiatus, in December 2008, Wolfgang released their seventh studio album, titled Villains. The record didn't include any input from longtime drummer Gemora, who was busy with Lokomotiv. Instead, he was replaced by Francis Aquino.

On December 10, 2008, the band launched Villains at The Black Christmas Project, a live performance at Eastwood City Central Plaza.

=== Ang Bagong Dugo Sa Lumang Ugat ===
In August 2012, the band released a new single and music video, "Sandata", from the EP Ang Bagong Dugo Sa Lumang Ugat - Unang Kabanata, released the same year. This was their first album sung entirely in Tagalog.

=== Artadi's health condition ===
In 2009, Basti Artadi was diagnosed with a tumor in his head, located on the nerves that control the right side of his face, leading to partial paralysis. He was told by doctors that his condition could cause him to not be able to talk or sing. To date, Artadi has been able to continue in his musical activities despite the tumor. In May 2017, Artadi returned to performing after having a facial tumor operation.

=== Death of Mon Legaspi ===
Mon Legaspi, the band's longtime bassist, who had also played with the bands The Dawn and Kontra, died of cardiac arrest on October 3, 2022.

== Band members ==
Current

- Basti Artadi – vocals (1992–2002, 2007–present)
- Manuel Legarda – guitars (1992–2002, 2007–present)
- Francis Aquino – drums (2007–present)

Past

- Mon Legaspi – bass (1992–2002, 2007–2022); died 2022
- Leslie "Wolf" Gemora – drums (1992–2002)

== Discography ==
| Title | Date of release (Philippines) | Record label |
|---|---|---|
| Wolfgang | 1995 | Ivory Music (Formerly Ivory Records) |
| Semenelin | 1996 | Sony BMG Music Entertainment |
| Wurm | 1997 | Sony BMG Music Entertainment |
| Serve in Silence | March 1999 | Sony BMG Music Entertainment |
| Acoustica | 2000 | Sony BMG Music Entertainment |
| Black Mantra | August 2001 | Sony BMG Music Entertainment |
| Villains | December 2008 | Semenelin Music |
| Ang Bagong Dugo Sa Lumang Ugat - Unang Kabanata | August 2012 | Semenelin Music |

== Awards and nominations ==
| Year | Award-giving body | Category | Nominated work | Results |
|---|---|---|---|---|
| 1995 | NU Rock Awards | Guitarist of the Year | (for Manuel Legarda) | Won |
| 1996 | NU Rock Awards | Artist of the Year | —N/a | Won |
| 1996 | NU Rock Awards | Vocalist of the Year | (for Basti Artadi) | Won |
| 1996 | NU Rock Awards | Bassist of the Year | (for Mon Legaspi) | Won |
| 1996 | NU Rock Awards | Drummer of the Year | (for Wolf Gemora) | Won |
| 1996 | NU Rock Awards | Listener's Choice | —N/a | Won |
| 1998 | NU Rock Awards | Artist of the Year | —N/a | Won |
| 1998 | NU Rock Awards | Vocalist of the Year | (for Basti Artadi) | Won |
| 1998 | NU Rock Awards | Drummer of the Year | (for Wolf Gemora) | Won |
| 1998 | NU Rock Awards | Listener's Choice | —N/a | Won |
| 1998 | NU Rock Awards | Song of the Year | "Sanctified", "Hell Looks", "I.O.U", "Emperor Worm" | Nominated |
| 1998 | NU Rock Awards | Album of the Year | Wurm | Nominated |
| 1998 | NU Rock Awards | Best Album Packaging | Wurm | Nominated |
| 1998 | NU Rock Awards | Producer of the Year | (Dennis Cham for Wurm) | Nominated |
| 1998 | NU Rock Awards | Guitarist of the Year | (for Manuel Legarda) | Nominated |
| 1998 | NU Rock Awards | Bassist of the Year | (for Mon Legaspi) | Nominated |
| 1999 | NU Rock Awards | Album of the Year (shared with Sandwich) | Serve in Silence | Won |
| 1999 | NU Rock Awards | Vocalist of the Year | (for Basti Artadi) | Won |
| 1999 | NU Rock Awards | Best Album Packaging | Service in Silence | Won |
| 1999 | NU Rock Awards | Listener's Choice | —N/a | Won |
| 2000 | Awit Awards | Best Rock Recording | "Atomica" | Won |
| 2000 | MTV Pilipinas Music Awards | Favorite Group Video | "Atomica" | Nominated |
| 2000 | NU Rock Awards | Vocalist of the Year | (for Basti Artadi) | Won |
| 2000 | NU Rock Awards | Guitarist of the Year | (for Manuel Legarda) | Nominated |
| 2000 | NU Rock Awards | Bassist of the Year | (for Mon Legaspi) | Nominated |
| 2000 | NU Rock Awards | Drummer of the Year | (for Wolf Gemora) | Nominated |
| 2001 | 7th Katha Awards | Rock Vocal Performance | "Center of the Sun" | Won |
| 2001 | NU Rock Awards | Guitarist of the Year | (for Manuel Legarda) | Won |
| 2001 | NU Rock Awards | Artist of the Year | —N/a | Nominated |
| 2001 | NU Rock Awards | Song of the Year | "No Falter" | Nominated |
| 2001 | NU Rock Awards | Album of the Year | Acoustica | Nominated |
| 2001 | NU Rock Awards | Best Album Packaging | Acoustica | Nominated |
| 2001 | NU Rock Awards | Vocalist of the Year | (for Basti Artadi) | Nominated |
| 2001 | NU Rock Awards | Bassist of the Year | (for Mon Legaspi) | Nominated |
| 2001 | NU Rock Awards | Drummer of the Year | (for Wolf Gemora) | Nominated |
| 2002 | 15th Awit Awards | Best Rock Recording | "No Falter" | Won |
| 2002 | MTV Pilipinas Music Award | Best Group | "Meckam" | Nominated |
| 2002 | 8th Katha Awards | Rock Vocal Performance | "No Falter" & "Revolution Now" | Nominated |
| 2002 | 8th Katha Awards | Best Rock Song | "No Falter" & "Revolution Now" | Nominated |
| 2009 | NU Rock Awards | Vocalist of the Year | (for Basti Artadi) | Nominated |
| 2009 | NU Rock Awards | Best Rock Group | (for Francis Aquino) | Nominated |
| 2010 | Asia Voice Indie Music Awards | Best Rock Vocalist | (for Basti Artadi) | Nominated |
| 2010 | Asia Voice Indie Music Awards | Best Rock Group | —N/a | Won |
| 2012 | Yahoo OMG! Awards | Band of the Year | —N/a | Nominated |
| 2013 | Myx Music Awards 2013 | Favorite Rock Video | "Sandata" | Nominated |

Awards
| Preceded by "The Jerks"; The Jerks | NU Rock Awards; Album of the Year "Serve in Silence" together with Grip Stand Throw; 1999 | Succeeded by Free; Rivermaya |
