= Lokomotiv (band) =

American-Filipino rock band

- Origin: Manila, Philippines; California, US
- Genres: Hard rock, heavy metal
- Years active: 2003–2007
- Labels: EMI
- Spinoff of: Wolfgang; Razorback
- Past members: Wolf Gemora; David Aguirre; Danny Gonzalez; Ryan Hudson; Basti Artadi; James MacDonnell

Lokomotiv was a Southern California-based rock band that counted among its lineup key members of two of the most successful hard rock bands in the Philippines during the 1990s—Wolfgang and Razorback.

== History ==
In 2002, Basti Artadi and Wolf Gemora of Wolfgang decided to leave the Philippines and settle in the United States.

Lokomotiv first came together in January 2003 in Orange County, California, with Gemora, California native Danny Gonzales, and guitarist James MacDonnell forming the initial lineup. A year later, David Aguirre of Razorback was recruited into the band. A few months later, Artadi, who was then living in San Francisco, was offered the job of fronting the group; he accepted. At this point, MacDonnell opted to leave the band.

== Debut album, new vocalist, and breakup ==
In October 2005, the band recorded their debut album, entitled Rock N' Roll Death Toll. A music video was filmed for the track "Five Alive". This saw heavy rotation in the Philippines through MYX Music Channel and MTV Asia. The album was released in the Philippines in September 2006.

Artadi left the band on June 24, 2006, due to "musical and creative differences". In late August 2006, singer/songwriter Ryan Hudson, hailing from Norman, Oklahoma, took Artadi's place.

Lokomotiv returned to the Philippines late in 2006 to tour in support of their debut album. One of the events they played was the MTV Music Summit 2006 for HIV/AIDS at the Bonifacio Global City Open Field, Taguig, Manila. The quartet then went back to the United States to continue performing and recording new material for their second album, which was tentatively scheduled for release in the fall of 2007. However, in an online interview, drummer Wolf Gemora announced that the band had broken up soon after the Philippine tour due to financial difficulties.
