= Yano (album) =

Studio album by Yano
- Released: June 30, 1994 (re-released 1998)
- Genre: Alternative rock, punk rock
- Label: Alpha Records & BMG Records (Pilipinas) Inc.
- Producer: Rudy Y. Tee

Yano chronology
Yano (1994)	Bawal (1996)

Singles from Yano
- 1. "Naroon" Released: 1995

Professional ratings
Review scores
Source	Rating
Allmusic	4/5 stars

Yano is the debut album of Filipino rock band, Yano. It has 12 tracks and released under Alpha Records in 1994. and re-released under BMG Records (Pilipinas) Inc. in 1998 with additional two tracks from their second album Bawal.

== Accolades ==
Publication	Country	Accolade	Year	Rank
Esquire Magazine	Philippines	10 Essential OPM Albums of the 1990s	2019	*

* denotes an unordered list

== Track listing ==
1. "Kumusta Na" (How are You?) – 3:28
2. "Tsinelas" (Slippers) – 2:44
3. "State U" – 2:47
4. "Banal na Aso, Santong Kabayo" (Holy Dog, Saintly Horse) – 4:25
5. "Trapo" (literally "Dust Rag," but also a pejorative term for "traditional politician," i.e. "tra + po")
6. "Iskolar Ng Bayan" (The Nation's Scholar) – 2:57
7. "Kaka" – 2:03
8. "Esem" (wordplay for SM) – 3:38
9. "Travel Times" - 4:47
10. "Mc'Jo" (wordplay for McDonald's and Jollibee) – 2:51
11. "Coño Ka P're" - 2:21
12. "Ate" (Elder Sister) - 2:58
13. "Senti" (short for "Sentimental") - 4:44
14. "Naroon" (There) - 3:16

== Personnel ==
- Dong Abay – lead vocals
- Eric Gancio – guitar, backing vocals
- Onie Badiang – bass, backing vocal
- Nowie Favila – drums & percussion

== Notes ==
- Ate and Travel Times are originally published in their second album Bawal and the latter is actually a remixed version of Dayo.
