= Tara (Yano album) =

Studio album by Yano
- Released: 1997
- Recorded: Republic of Sounds
- Genre: Pinoy rock, alternative rock, post-punk
- Label: Musiko Records & BMG Records (Pilipinas) Inc.
- Producer: BMG Records (Pilipinas) Inc.

Yano chronology
Bawal (1996)	Tara (1997)

Professional ratings
Review scores
Source	Rating
Allmusic	4/5 stars

Tara is the third and last studio album of the original member Filipino rock band, Yano. It has 11 tracks and also its first album for major label BMG Records (Pilipinas), Inc. having moved from local independent, Alpha Records.

== Track listing ==
All tracks by Dong Abay and Eric Gancio, except where noted.

1. "Ako" (Me) Eric Gancio – 04:48
2. "Paalam Sampaguita" (Goodbye Sampaguita) – 03:39
3. "Tara" (Let's Go) – 04:46
4. "Kaklase" (Classmate) – 04:45
5. "Abno" (short for Abnormal) – 04:36
6. "Mercy" – 04:27
7. "Going Home" – 04:30
8. "Me Mama" (There's A Man) Dong Abay, Eric Gancio and Onie Badiang – 04:37
9. "Shobis" (Showbiz) – 02:01
10. "War" Eric Gancio – 03:49)
11. "Isa" (One) – 02:35

== Personnel ==
- Dong Abay – lead vocals
- Eric Gancio – guitar, backing vocals
- Onie Badiang – bass, backing vocal
- Jun Nogoy – drums
- Nowie Favila – drums for Mercy
