= The Youth (band) =

Filipino punk rock band

- Origin: Manila, Philippines
- Genres: Alternative rock; post-punk; punk rock; Pinoy rock
- Years active: 1989–1997; 2004–present
- Labels: Backbeat (1990-1993, 2004-present); MCA Music (1993-1997)
- Members: Dodong Cruz; Erap Carrasco; Robert Javier; Marquel Martin
- Past members: Pat Epino; John Olidan; Raul Velez; Zaldy Carrasco

The Youth is a Filipino rock band. Their music is a mixture of punk, post-punk and alternative rock, influenced heavily by Wuds, a pioneering Filipino punk band.

== Early years ==
At first, the band was called “Boyish Day”. It formed in 1989 composed of Dodong Cruz (bass/backup vocals), Erap Carrasco (drums), Pat Mabingnay (lead guitars) and Zaldy Carrasco (lead singer). They played music suitable during the time: New wave, alternative and punk music, which were common on the radio station (Capital Radio's) XB 102. The station saw the origins of what would be one of the most famous local acts of the early 1990s.

Due to musical differences, the group separated and formed other groups. Dodong and Pat formed EnVoice, while Erap and Zaldy, together with John Olidan, formed Obscure Tone. Whenever there were concerts, Dodong, Erap and John always volunteer to do front acts when nobody wanted to. The trio became popular, and they decided to form a new group called The Youth. Their first underground hit song was “Amen”. Thereafter, Dodong was named as "kristo". Another member joined The Youth in the person of Raul Velez. Prior to the release of The Youth's self-titled first album, John Olidan migrated to Canada. He was replaced by Robert Javier. With their diverse influences, The Youth was able to produce their very own signature sound.

In 1990, Richard Tan of Backbeat Records took them under his wing. They were able to record and release a self-titled independent/indie album, "The Youth". Like any other indie production, the album had limited success. It is now considered a collector's item.

The band started performing in different underground gigs. They even penned themselves as “Da Wol” while signing up for the 1990 RJ Battle of the Bands, a contest strictly for amateur bands only, which meant that it was only for bands who had not recorded any albums yet. Even with the indie album under their belt, they made it to the top and won the contest. Shortly after, Velez and Olidan left the band. The departure of the two members was immediately replaced by bassist Robert Javier, forming the classic three-piece line-up of The Youth. As soon as he started jamming with the band, he injected his own off-beat humor into the band’s songs and performances. Due to frontman Cruz’s persistence, Club Dredd finally agreed to book the band in 1991. Considering their high-volume, high-energy and highly-impromptu performances, the band slowly established a cult following after several months of gigs. Soon, they became a headliner of the club. Their shows were sold-out, sometimes twice a week or more. Their combined punk, alternative rock, hard rock and satirical humor, were a hit to the audiences who warmed up to their irreverent humor and distinct musicality. People returned again and again, with each performance having surprises.

== Going Major ==
1993 witnessed the band’s signing to a major label. A few months after Eraserheads were signed to BMG Music Pilipinas, The Youth was contracted by Universal Music. This started the so-called “alternative music boom”. In 1994, the band released their debut album, "Album na Walang Pamagat" (Album Without a Title). It contained the carrier single "Multo sa Paningin (Multong Bakla)," which became an instant hit. Javier started writing songs and The Youth gained massive airplay on different radio stations across the nation, and the album was certified Platinum.

In 1995, The Youth started recording their follow-up album, "Tao Po". However, the album's release was delayed due to the band's hectic schedule in doing concerts all over the country. In 1997, the much-awaited "Tao Po" was finally released. Though the album sales were similar to that of their debut album, the reviews were mixed, partly due to the local alternative rock's commercial decline. With lack of airplay and promotion, gigs slowly declined as well.

== Breakup/Post-The Youth/Reunion ==
Relationships between members became strained for the two opposing songwriters whose influences caused the break-up of the band. Fans were in complete shock when frontman Dodong Cruz pursued a solo career and unexpectedly scored a deal with JML Records, marking the end of the band’s heyday. The two remaining members went ahead and formed Warehouse Club. Cruz's solo career was a moderate success as his debut album, Experimento hit gold status. As the label revamped into a newly formed Star Records, Cruz faded into obscurity for several years.

Then in November 1999, The Youth reformed and performed at Mayric's. The gig was supposed to be a one-night reunion show only, but the resounding success of the gig inspired them to continue recording and get back into the mainstream.

In 2004, the band released a song as part of the Jack Daniel's In Session: Manila compilation. The Youth is composed of Dodong Cruz as the band's vocalist and guitarist, Robert Javier on bass and vocals, and Erap Carrasco on drums. In 2004, the band released a song as part of the Jack Daniel's In Session: Manila compilation.

In 2012, The Youth came back to the OPM rock music scene with their much awaited 5th and reunion album Pirata.

In 2014, new guitarist Marquel Martin joined the group. The band is still doing gigs both local and international. You can still find them playing at the bars around the metro. 2017 marked The Youth's much awaited recording come back for their latest single "Switek".

On 2022, the band will release a reissue of their album "Pirata" on vinyl format.

== Members ==
=== Current members ===
- Dodong Cruz (vocals, guitarist)
- Erap Carrasco (drums)
- Robert Javier (bassist, vocals)
- Marquel Martin (vocals, guitarist)

== Discography ==
| Date of Release | Title | Label |
|---|---|---|
| 1990 | The Youth | Backbeat |
| 1994 | Album Na Walang Pamagat | PolyCosmic Records |
| 1997 | Tao Po | PolyCosmic Records |
| 2004 - Compilation | Jack Daniel’s In Session…Manila | Backbeat |
| 2012 | Pirata | Robert Javier / Black Bihon Music Productions |

== Awards ==
| Year | Award giving body | Category | Nominated work | Results |
|---|---|---|---|---|
| 1994 | NU Rock Awards | Best New Artist(shared with Yano | —N/a | Won |
