= Chicosci (album) =

Studio album by Chicosci
- Released: 6 June 2006; 2 March 2007 (Repackaged Edition)
- Recorded: December 2005–April 2006; Tower Of Doom Digital Recording Studio
- Genre: Post-hardcore; pop-punk; emo; goth punk
- Language: English
- Label: Universal-MCA Records
- Producer: Eric Perlas and Chicosci

Chicosci chronology
Icarus (2004)	Chicosci (2006)	Fly Black Hearts (2009)

Singles from Chicosci
- 1. "A Promise" Released: June 2006; 2. "7 Black Roses" Released: January 2007; 3. "Chicosci Vampire Social Club" Released: May 2007; 4. "Last Look" Released: November 2007

Professional ratings
Review scores
Source	Rating
titikpilipino.com	4/5 stars

Chicosci is the fourth album by the Filipino band Chicosci. It was independently released on June 6, 2006 and was repackaged with 3 bonus tracks by Universal-MCA Records Philippines.

== Track listing ==
No.	Title	Length
1.	"A Promise"	3:05
2.	"Chicosci Vampire Social Club"	3:03
3.	"Seven Black Roses"	4:04
4.	"Sweet Maria"	4:19
5.	"The Devil Made Me Do It"	3:05
6.	"Knives"	3:20
7.	"Manila Teenage Death Squad"	2:44
8.	"You're Killing Me"	4:12
9.	"Last Look"	3:57
10.	"Matinee"	3:26
11.	"Pink Hearts, Yellow Stars (Harlequin Lover)"	3:18
12.	"January Days"	4:22

Bonus CD tracklist
No.	Title	Length
13.	"A Promise (Quiet)"	4:01
14.	"Seven Black Roses (To Sleep)"	4:22
15.	"CVSC (The Graduation)"	3:47

== Music videos from singles ==
- A Promise on YouTube
- 7 Black Roses on YouTube
- Chicosci Vampire Social Club on YouTube
- Last Look on YouTube
