= Semenelin =

Studio album by Wolfgang
- Released: June 15, 1996 (Local), April 25, 1997 (International)
- Studio: HIT Productions; Perfecto Music Studio
- Genre: Hard rock; alternative metal
- Label: Sony Music Entertainment
- Producer: Perfecto de Castro

Wolfgang chronology
Wolfgang (1995)	Semenelin (1996)	Wurm (1997)

Singles from Semenelin
- 1. "Roadworthy Man" Released: 1996; 2. "Weightless" Released: 1996

Professional ratings
Review scores
Source	Rating
AllMusic	4/5 stars

Semenelin is the second full-length studio album by Filipino rock band Wolfgang released in 1996 in the Philippines and 1997 internationally. The record is their first release under Epic Records, a division of Sony Music Entertainment, after leaving Ivory Records.

== Accolades ==
Publication	Country	Accolade	Year	Rank
Esquire Magazine	Philippines	10 Essential OPM Albums of the 1990s	2019	*

* denotes an unordered list

== Track listing ==
All tracks are written by Wolfgang, except where noted.

No.	Title	Length
1.	"Love & Despair"	5:13
2.	"Bought & Sold"	4:32
3.	"I..."	3:18
4.	"Mata Ng Diyos" (The Eyes of God)	4:43
5.	"Cathedral of Space"	4:43
6.	"Center of the Sun"	3:16
7.	"Beast"	3:30
8.	"Weightless"	3:46
9.	"Semenelin"	6:24
10.	"Blue 11" (writer: Manuel Legarda)	1:53
11.	"Mula Sa Kamandag" (From the Venom)	3:17
12.	"New Mother Nature/Verwirrung"	6:56
13.	"Change"	5:07
Total length:		57:34

== Personnel ==
=== Musicians ===
- Basti Artadi – vocals, additional percussion (track 13)
- Manuel Legarda – guitar, backing vocals (track 3)
- Mon Legaspi – bass
- Wolf Gemora – drums
- Boyet Aquino – drums (tracks 1, 11, 12)
- Jay Ignacio – laughter (track 2)
- Perfecto de Castro – backing vocals (track 3), cello (track 10), extra musician (on "Roadworthy Man")
- Diego Garrido – cello (track 10)
- David Aguirre – extra musician (on "Roadworthy Man")
- Tirso Ripoll – extra musician (on "Roadworthy Man")
- Joey of Saga – backing vocals (track 11)
- Brian Velasco – additional percussion (track 13)
- Wam – additional percussion (track 13)
- Toni – additional percussion (track 13)

=== Production and design ===
- Mony Romana – executive producer
- Perfecto de Castro – producer, mixing
- Diego Garrido – engineer, mixing
- Wam – assistant engineer
- Dennis Cham – mastering
- Miguel Mari – art direction, design
- Martin Mari – art direction, design
- Christina Castillo – photography
- Jay Ignacio – photography
- Allan Klar – album art, single art
- Joni Lu – sleeve design
- Carlos Hubilla – sleeve design
- Chris Guodotti – typesetting, layout

== Videos ==
- "Weightless"
