= Put3ska =

Filipino ska band

- Also known as: Put3Ska
- Origin: Manila, Philippines
- Genres: Ska
- Years active: 1993–1998, 2019 (one off reunion)
- Label: OctoArts/EMI
- Past members: Myra Ruaro; Arnold Morales; Bing Austria; Luis Guiang; Rodney Ambat; Richard Cruz; Eldie Siochi; Rommel Cruz; Gio Punongbayan; Marvin M Flores; Tuesday Vargas

Put3ska was a Filipino ska band formed in 1993. The band's name is word play, combining the Filipino phrase, putres ka ("damn you") and "ska". The band referred to itself as a "60s-oriented, 90s ska band, influenced by Jamaican and British ska".

== History ==
Put3ska was officially launched in 1993. The band released their first album, Put3ska, in 1994. The album carried the hit single Manila Girl, which earned the group a gold record award. That same year, the band was voted Best New Artist, Best Live Act and Myra Rauro voted Best Vocalist during the 1995 NU Rock Awards; the music video for Manila Girl was also nominated at the 1996 MTV Video Music Awards as Viewers' Choice For Asia.

The second album, Manila's Finest was released in 1996. It featured original material, some in the Tagalog language, as well as a cover version of the classic ska hit My Boy Lollipop by Millie Small and a Northern Soul Classic Tainted Love by Gloria Jones.

In 1998 Myra Ruaro left the band and formed a new band The Brownbeat All Stars, she was replaced by Marizel Serangelo. The band celebrated their 6th Anniversary at Music Museum on September 1, 2000

On May 24, 2019, the band returned with a reunion concert at the Music Museum in Greenhills.

Former Put3ska band vocalist member Myra Rauro was guested in a segment of "Bawal Judgemental" in a longest running weekday variety program, "Eat Bulaga" aired on GMA Network, also with other fellow band members, "Shamrock" vocalist Marc Tupaz, former Color It Red vocalist and now "Apartel" backing vocalist and now Artstart Band Vocalist Cookie Chua, former "Orange & Lemons" band vocalist and former "Kenyo" band vocalist and now comedian writer and occasional actor McCoy Fundales, former "Freestyle" vocalist Jinky Vidal, and "True Faith" vocalist Medwin Marfil.

== Discography ==
=== Studio albums ===
- "Put3ska" (PolyEast Records, 1994)
- "Manila's Finest" (PolyEast Records, 1998)

=== Singles ===
- "Manila Girl" (released in 1995 & nominated As "International Viewers Choice For Asia", 1996 MTV Video Music Awards in New York)
- "My Boy Lollipop" (original by Millie Small, Released in 1998)

== Awards ==
Year	Award giving body	Category	Nominated work	Results
1995	NU Rock Awards	Best New Artist	—N/a	Won
1995	NU Rock Awards	Vocalist of the Year	(for Myra Ruaro)	Won
1995	NU Rock Awards	Best Live Act	—N/a	Won
1997	NU Rock Awards	Keyboardist of the Year	(for Bing Austria)	Won
1997	NU Rock Awards	Best Live Act	—N/a	Won

== See also ==
- Reggae
- Ska
