= Chicosci =

Filipino rock band

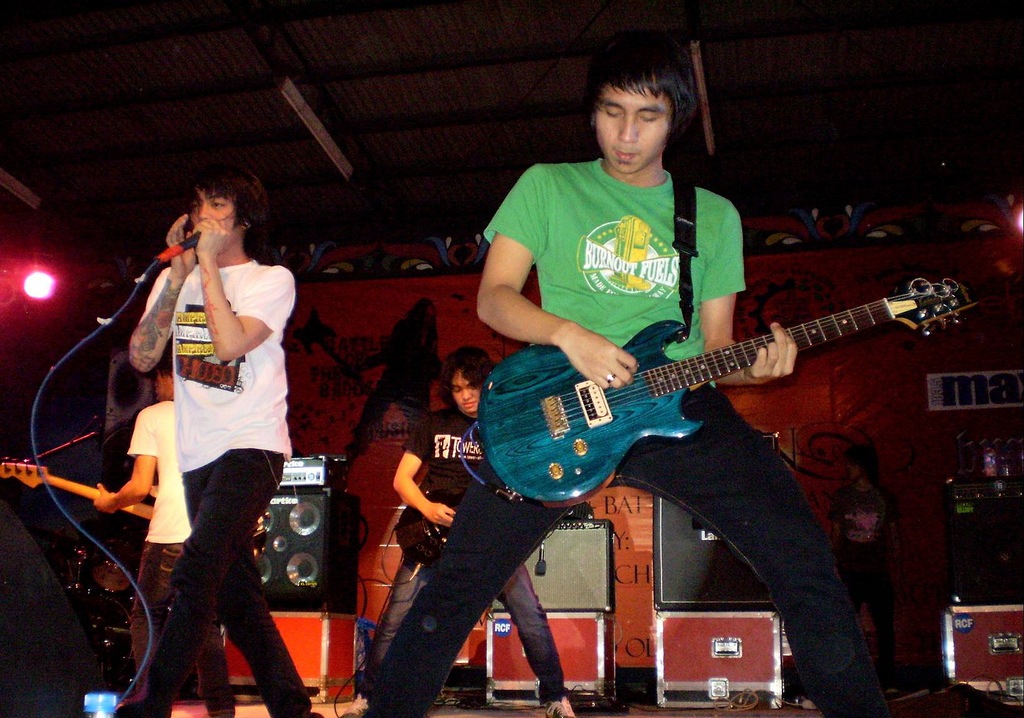

Background information
- Origin: Manila, Philippines
- Genres: Post-hardcore; pop-punk; emo; rap metal (early); nu metal (early)
- Years active: 1996–present
- Labels: Universal/MCA Music; Viva Records; EMI Music
- Members: Miggy Chavez; Mong Alcaraz; Eco del Rio; Victor Guison
- Past members: B-Boy Garcia; Yug Esquivias; Sonny Baquisal; Joel Salvador; Calde Calderon; Macoy Estacio; Ariel Lumanlan

Chicosci (officially stylized as ChicoSci) is a Filipino rock band based in Manila. The band is currently composed of Miggy Chavez, Mong Alcaraz, Eco del Rio and Victor Guison. The group's musical style primarily consists of rock with an emphasis of experimentation from nu metal and rap metal to pop-punk, post-hardcore and emo.

== Background ==
=== Career as Chico Science ===
The highly successful debut record established support for Chico Science as one of the forerunners of the new generation of rock. Revenge of the Giant Robot spawned hits such as "Amen", "Soopafly", and the MTV hit, "Sink or Swim". This album was also nominated to the prestigious Awit Awards for Best Rock Recording. Their first-ever music video "Sink or Swim", directed by Lyle Sacris, also won as the Best Directed Video for the 2001 MTV Pilipinas Awards. Later on, they decided to change the name Chico Science to ChicoSci, in order not to be confused with the Brazilian singer.

=== Career as ChicoSci ===
On June 6, 2006, ChicoSci released and launched their self-titled 4th album. Having been in the studio for more than a year, the band boasts it as being their best work to date. The self-produced album features catchier melodies and more synth playing from Alcaraz. At the same time, there is minimal screaming and more focus on Chavez's singing, the most obvious change on the self-titled album. On March 2, 2007, the repackaged edition of the self titled album were released.

With the release of their carrier single "A Promise", ChicoSci gained more popularity as their market grew. ChicoSci went on to play in Malaysia and Singapore as well as local hot spots like Cafe Saguijo. The album has spawned four singles, "A Promise", "Seven Black Roses", "ChicoSci Vampire Social Club" and "Last Look". The music video for "ChicoSci Vampire Social Club" won the Favorite Rock Video at the 2008 Myx Music Awards. The band released their fifth studio album, Fly Black Hearts in 2009. the band's carrier single "Diamond Shotgun" was premiered at the NU Rock 107.5 FM on June 29, 2009. and a music video was premiered on MYX Channel on September 13, 2009.

The same year, Under UMG Philippines (Formerly known as MCA Music), ChicoSci released 2 singles entitled "Raspberry: Girl" and "Stealing Kisses" from their album This Is Not A Chicosci Record. Their first music video of the song "Raspberry: Girl" was from Tower Sessions and the second music video is their official music video of the song.

In 2014, ChicoSci released "Iyong Araw" for Colgate Fresh Jam. This is their first original Tagalog song.

In 2017, Under Tower Of Doom Music, Chicosci released the single "Buzzin'".

In 2018, Chicosci released the single "Revalation!".

On November 11, 2018, Chicosci released the single "Like We Used To".

In 2019, the band released the single "Daylight".

In 2023, Chicosci released the single "Dust".

In 2025, Chicosci released the single "Biktima". The song "Biktima" blends electronic rock, pop, post-hardcore, and subtle metalcore elements. It features a combination of clean and screamed vocals, synths, electronic textures, and a heavy instrumental breakdown, highlighting the band’s continued experimentation with genre fusion and dynamic sound.

== Discography ==
=== Studio albums & singles ===
2000 – Revenge of the Giant Robot
2002 – Method of Breathing
2004 – Icarus
2006 – ChicoSci
2009 – Fly Black Hearts
2012 – This Is Not A Chicosci Record
2017 – Buzzin
2018 – Revalation!
2018 – Like We Used To
2019 – Daylight
2019 – Silent Night
2023 – Dust
2025 – Biktima

== Awards and nominations ==
Year	Award giving body	Category	Nominated work	Results
2000	NU Rock Awards	Best Album Packaging	"Revenge of the Giant Robot"	Won
2001	Awit Awards	Best Rock Song	"Sink or Swim"	Nominated
2001	MTV Pilipinas Music Awards	Best Director	Lyle Sacris for "Sink or Swim"	Won
2001	NU Rock Awards	Best Designed Album Cover	"Revenge of the Giant Robot"	Won
2001	NU Rock Awards	Song of the Year	"Sink or Swim"	Nominated
2001	NU Rock Awards	Best Music Video	"Sink or Swim"	Nominated
2002	NU Rock Awards	Song of the Year	"Paris"	Won
2002	NU Rock Awards	Guitarist of the Year	(for Mong Alcaraz and Sonny Baquisal)	Won
2002	NU Rock Awards	Drummer of the Year	(for Joel Salvador)	Nominated
2002	NU Rock Awards	Artist of The Year	—N/a	Nominated
2004	NU Rock Awards	Album of the Year	"Icarus"	Nominated
2004	NU Rock Awards	Guitarist of the Year	(for Mong Alcaraz and Sonny Baquisal)	Nominated
2004	NU Rock Awards	Best Album Packaging	"Icarus"	Nominated
2006	NU Rock Awards	Guitarist of the Year	(for Mong Alcaraz)	Won
2006	NU Rock Awards	Male of the Year	(for Mong Alcaraz)	Won
2007	NU Rock Awards	Vocalist of the Year	(for Miggy Chavez)	Nominated
2007	NU Rock Awards	Guitarist of the Year	(for Mong Alcaraz)	Nominated
2007	NU Rock Awards	Bassist of the Year	(for Carlos Calderon)	Nominated
2007	NU Rock Awards	Drummer of the Year	(for Joel Salvador)	Nominated
2007	NU Rock Awards	Best Live Act	—N/a	Nominated
2007	NU Rock Awards	Song of the Year	“Chicosci Vampire Social Club"	Nominated
2007	NU Rock Awards	Artist of the Year	—N/a	Nominated
2008	MTV Asia Awards	Favorite Artist of Philippines	—N/a	Won
2008	MYX Music Awards	Favorite Rock Video	"Chicosi Social Vampire Social Club"	Won
2008	MYX Music Awards	Favorite Music Video	"Chicosi Social Vampire Social Club"	Nominated
2008	MYX Music Awards	Favorite Song	"Chicosi Social Vampire Social Club"	Nominated
2008	MYX Music Awards	Favorite Artist	—N/a	Nominated
2008	MYX Music Awards	Favorite Group	—N/a	Nominated
2009	NU Rock Awards	Listener's Choice Award	—N/a	Won
2009	NU Rock Awards	Song of the Year	"Diamond Shotgun"	Nominated
2010	NU Rock Awards	Album of the Year	"Fly Black Hearts"	Nominated
2010	NU Rock Awards	Bassist of the Year	(for Carlos Calderon)	Nominated

== Members ==
- Current
  - Miguel "Miggy" Chavez – lead vocals, additional guitar (1996–present)
  - Miguel "Mong" Alcaraz – lead guitar, vocals, piano, synthesizer, programming, sampling, effects (1996–present)
  - Eco del Rio – bass guitar, vocals (2016–present)
  - Victor Guison – drums (2019–present)
- Former
  - B-Boy Garcia – turntables (2000). Last appeared on Sink or Swim music video. He eventually joined Queso and briefly in Greyhoundz.
  - Eugene "Yug" Esquivias – percussions (2000–07). Last appeared on Seven Black Roses music video. Esquivias left for Canada.
  - Sonny Baquisal – guitars (2000–07). Last seen on ChicoSci Vampire Social Club music video. Baquisal left to go to Italy with his family. Replaced by Ariel Lumanlan of the metalcore band Arcadia in November 2007.
  - Joel Salvador – drums (1996–2008). Last seen on ChicoSci Myx Live Performance. Left the band to pursue job opportunity abroad. Replaced by Macoy Estacio of the post-hardcore band April Morning Skies.
  - Carlos "Calde" Calderon – bass guitar, vocals (1996–2016). Calderon left the band amicably due to career change. Replaced by Eco del Rio of the alternative rock band, Jejaview, and 88 City.
  - Mark "Macoy" Estacio – drums (2008–2019). No official statement of departure.
  - Ariel Lumanlan – rhythm and lead guitar (2007–2019). No official statement of departure.
