= Wurm (album) =

Studio album by Wolfgang
- Released: 12 December 1997 (Local release), 1 March 1998 (Japan)
- Studio: HIT Production
- Genre: Hard rock; alternative metal
- Length: 65:21
- Label: Sony Music Entertainment
- Producer: Dennis Cham; Wolfgang

Wolfgang chronology
Semenelin (1996)	Wurm (1997)	Serve in Silence (1999)

Professional ratings
Review scores
Source	Rating
AllMusic	link

Wurm is the third studio album by Filipino rock band Wolfgang released in 1997. It is an English-language concept album about a man who criticized and then replaced his emperor. However, he in turn was criticized when he ascended to the throne. The album achieved Platinum status in the Philippines. The record was also released in Japan in 1998 through Sony Music Japan.

== Track listing ==
All tracks are written by Wolfgang, except where noted.

No.	Title	Writer(s)	Length
1.	"Sanctified"		3:28
2.	"Alone"		3:25
3.	"I.O.U."		3:34
4.	"24"		5:29
5.	"Molds"		6:07
6.	"Hell Looks"		2:28
7.	"The Last Solar Eclipse of the 21st Century"	Wolf Gemora	5:51
8.	"Bring Down the Godhead"		5:25
9.	"She Is My Cain"	S. Artadi, M. Legarda	3:32
10.	"Emperor Worm"		3:45
11.	"Aching Tree"		4:08
12.	"Twist of Lime"		4:32
13.	"A Matter of Time"		4:04
14.	"Very Free"		4:27
15.	"Le Fusilier's Theme"		7:06

== Personnel ==
- Basti Artadi – vocals
- Manuel Legarda – guitar
- Mon Legaspi – bass
- Wolf Gemora – drums
- Radhi – guest vocals (track 7, 13)
- Jeanne – guest vocals (track 7)

Production and design

- Dennis Cham – producer, engineer, mixer, mastering
- Wolfgang – producer, mixer
- Mony Romana – executive producer
- HIT Productions – recording and mixing studio
- Miguel Mari – art direction, design, photography
- Sebastian Artadi – art direction, design, photography
- Don Sepe – photography
- Cristina Cadtillo – photography
