= Method of Breathing =

Studio album by Chicosci
- Released: May 16, 2002
- Recorded: Tracks Studios
- Genre: Nu metal; post-hardcore; hardcore punk; alternative metal
- Length: 51:59
- Label: EMI Philippines
- Producer: Raimund Marasigan

Chicosci chronology
Revenge of the Giant Robot (2000)	Method of Breathing (2002)	Icarus (2004)

Singles from Method of Breathing
- 1. "Glass Is Broken" Released: 2002; 2. "Rolento" Released: 2002; 3. "Paris" Released: 2003

Professional ratings
Review scores
Source	Rating
Allmusic	4.5/5 stars

Method of Breathing is Chicosci's second album, released in 2002 under EMI Philippines.

== Track listing ==
No.	Title	Length
1.	"Solution Cairo (Nothing is Necessary Anymore)"	4:08
2.	"Rolento"	4:25
3.	"Glass Is Broken"	4:16
4.	"Paris"	3:59
5.	"Anything for Two"	3:07
6.	"Most Precious and Hopeless"	6:03
7.	"The Dance of Ones and Zeros"	4:17
8.	"The Sound and Taste of Tears Falling Upon Your Chest"	3:20
9.	"Drift / The Ugly Side of Things"	3:55
10.	"Colonized"	4:11
11.	"A Habit of Rest Brings Nothing"	3:55
12.	"Quail"	5:23

== Credits ==
- Executive producer: JV Colayco
- Supervising producers: Willie A. Monzon & Francis Guevarra
- Line producers: April Rama And Jade Ybanez
- Recording engineer: Angee Rozul
- Recorded, mixed and mastered at Tracks Studios
- Album cover art direction: Willie A. Monzon
- Cover design and digital imaging: Joseph R. Conde
- Album photography: Carlo Gueerrero
- Interactive CD design: Jomuel Mananquil

== Music videos ==
- Paris
