= Ang Bagong Dugo Sa Lumang Ugat – Unang Kabanata =

EP by Wolfgang
- Released: 3 August 2012
- Studio: Loudbox Studios
- Genre: Heavy metal Pinoy rock
- Label: Semenelin Music
- Producer: Manuel Legarda

Wolfgang chronology
Villains (2008)	Ang Bagong Dugo Sa Lumang Ugat – Unang Kabanata (2012)

Singles from Ang Bagong Dugo Sa Lumang Ugat – Unang Kabanata
- 1. "Sandata" Released: 2 August 2012

Ang Bagong Dugo Sa Lumang Ugat – Unang Kabanata is an EP by Filipino rock band Wolfgang, released on 3 August 2012. It is the last album to feature longtime bassist Mon Legaspi, who died on 3 October 2022.

== Track listing ==
No.	Title	Length
1.	"Kandila"	4:40
2.	"Sandata"	4:33
3.	"Ang Bagong Dugo sa Lumang Ugat"	4:01
4.	"Bulag"	5:07

== Personnel ==
- Sebastian "Basti" Artadi – vocals
- Manuel Legarda – guitar
- Ramon "Mon" Legaspi – bass
- Francis Aquino – drums
