= Black Mantra =

Studio album by Wolfgang
- Released: August 4, 2001 (Cassette); November 21, 2001 (CD)
- Studio: Tracks Studios
- Genres: Alternative metal; hard rock
- Length: 49:12
- Label: Sony Music Entertainment
- Producer: Wolfgang

Wolfgang chronology
Acoustica (2000)	Black Mantra (2001)	Villains (2008)

Singles from Black Mantra
- 1. "No Falter" Released: July 6, 2001; 2. "Judas Noose" Released: October 12, 2001; 3. "Meckam" Released: 2002

Professional ratings
Review scores
Source	Rating
Allmusic	link

Black Mantra is the fifth studio album by Filipino rock band Wolfgang released in 2001. It is the last album to feature drummer Wolf Gemora. Music videos for "Meckam" and "No Falter" were released.

== Track listing ==
Disc one
No.	Title	Length
1.	"Judas Noose"	4:43
2.	"Meckam"	3:51
3.	"Trenta"	3:51
4.	"Undertow"	4:31
5.	"Bow Unto The"	3:54
6.	"No Falter"	4:14
7.	"Shoulders Of Cain"	4:24
8.	"Bleed One Way"	4:40
9.	"Heaven Spent"	6:00
10.	"Idlip"	5:33
11.	"Revolution Now"	4:08

Disc two: Live Bootleg
No.	Title	Length
1.	"I'm A Mover"	3:19
2.	"Wishing Well"	3:49
3.	"Message In A Bottle"	6:00
4.	"Bitch"	3:41
5.	"Come Together"	4:27
6.	"Voodoo Chile"	11:09
7.	"Giyang"	5:10
8.	"Southern Cross"	4:50
9.	"Your Time Is Gonna Come"	4:42

== Personnel ==
- Sebastian "Basti" Artadi – vocals
- Manuel Legarda – guitar
- Ramon "Mon" Legaspi – bass
- Leslie "Wolf" Gemora – drums

Production and design

- Jet Galang – executive producer
- Pia Suantabillo – A&R supervision
- Louie Talan – mixing
- David Lasigameo – album art concept and design
- Tom Epperson – photography
- Allan Vekal – Wolfgang emblem
- Manuel Legarda – engineering
