= Wolfgang (album) =

Studio album by Wolfgang
- Released: 1995
- Recorded: 1994
- Studios: Greenhill Sound Recording and Mixing
- Genres: Heavy metal; hard rock; alternative metal
- Length: 35:00
- Label: Tone Def Records
- Producer: Kedy Sanchez

Wolfgang chronology
Wolfgang (1995)	Semenelin (1996)

Alternative cover
- 2001 re-release of the album as a part of The Legends Series by Ivory Records Corporation

Professional ratings
Review scores
Source	Rating
AllMusic	4/5 stars

Wolfgang is the debut studio album by Filipino rock band Wolfgang released in 1995. The album went Platinum less than a year after release in the Philippines.

== Track listing ==
All tracks are written by Wolfgang.

No.	Title	Length
1.	"Arise"	4:24
2.	"Halik Ni Hudas" (Judas' Kiss)	3:35
3.	"What Grows in Your Garden"	4:37
4.	"As Oceans"	5:27
5.	"Cast of Clowns"	3:48
6.	"Natutulog Kong Mundo" (My Sleeping World)	5:05
7.	"Left Alone"	3:10
8.	"Darkness Fell"	5:29

== Personnel ==
- Basti Artadi – vocals
- Manuel Legarda – guitar
- Wolf Gemora – drums
- Mon Legaspi – bass

Production and design

- F.C. Magcale – executive producer
- Neil Gregorio – assistant producer
- Ponz Martinez – production assistant
- Voltaire Orpiano – engineer
- Basti Artadi – cover illustration
- J. Bernal, P. Compañer – cover execution
