= Susan Calo-Medina =

Filipino television host (1941–2015)

- Born: September 20, 1941; Butuan, Agusan, Commonwealth of the Philippines
- Died: January 9, 2015 (aged 73); Makati, Philippines
- Occupations: Television host, writer, actress

Susan Calo-Medina (September 20, 1941 – January 9, 2015) was a Filipino television host, actress and writer.

== Education ==
Calo-Medina studied Drama in the Catholic University of America.

== Career ==
Calo-Medina was a marketing director of the Cultural Center of the Philippines and was a member of the Philippines' National Commission on Culture and the Arts’ Committee on Communication.

She was the host of travel shows Tipong Pinoy and Travel Time.

== Personal life ==
Calo-Medina was married to Juan Eulogio "Johnny" A. Medina, together they had three children: Consuelo, Marcos, and Luisa.

== Accolades ==
Calo-Medina was awarded posthumously the Dangal ng Haraya Lifetime Achievement Award by National Commission on Culture and the Arts. She was also a posthumous recipient of a Lifetime Achievement Award by St. Scholastica's College, Manila's St. Hildegarde Awards for Women in Media.
