= Icarus (Chicosci album) =

Studio album by Chicosci
- Released: May 25, 2004
- Studio: Sound Creation Studio; Tracks Studios
- Genre: Alternative metal; post-hardcore
- Length: 48:11
- Label: Viva Records
- Producer: Raimund Marasigan; Romel Sanchez; Buddy Zabala

Chicosci chronology
Method of Breathing (2002)	Icarus (2004)	Chicosci (2006)

Icarus is the third studio album by the alternative metal band Chicosci. It was released in 2004 on Viva Music.

== Track listing ==
No.	Title	Length
1.	"Theme from Conversations with Fire"	4:51
2.	"Open Casket Romance"	4:22
3.	"Gift of Tongues"	3:33
4.	"When Flight is Denied"	4:30
5.	"Shallow Graves"	2:49
6.	"An Argument"	5:18
7.	"Lavender Marriage"	4:07
8.	"Vanity"	3:53
9.	"The Strange Case of the Velvet Murders"	3:23
10.	"In Response: A Senseless Act of Beauty"	3:31
11.	"In Arms"	4:21
12.	"To Cleanse"	3:03

== Credits ==
- Executive producer: Vic del Rosario Jr.
- Associate producer: Vincent del Rosario
- Co-produced by Miguel Alcaraz
- Album cover and design by Cairo Visual
- Mixed and mastered by Angee Rozul at Tracks Studios

== Music videos from singles ==
- Shallow Graves on YouTube
