= Revenge of the Giant Robot =

Studio album by Chicosci
- Released: 2000
- Recorded: 1999
- Studio: Tracks Studios
- Genre: Nu metal; rap metal
- Length: 46:26
- Label: OctoArts-EMI Music Inc.
- Producer: Francis Reyes; Louie Talan

Chicosci chronology
Revenge of the Giant Robot (2000)	Method of Breathing (2002)

Singles from Revenge of the Giant Robot
- 1. "Soopafly" Released: 2000; 2. "Amen" Released: 2000; 3. "Sink or Swim" Released: 2001

Revenge of the Giant Robot is the debut studio album by Filipino rock band Chicosci released on 2000 under EMI Philippines. It is the only album released when Chicosci was still named Chico Science.

== Track listing ==
No.	Title	Length
1.	"My Sickness"	3:38
2.	"Amen"	3:46
3.	"Liar"	3:36
4.	"Sink Or Swim"	4:09
5.	"Someplace Nice"	4:33
6.	"Dim"	4:28
7.	"Soopafly"	3:23
8.	"Soy"	3:44
9.	"Cold (Subzero)"	4:02
10.	"Pimpstyle"	3:42
11.	"Lolidus"	3:35
12.	"Infect"	3:50
