= Serve in Silence =

Studio album by Wolfgang
- Released: 21 March 1999
- Studio: Tracks Studios; Midi Sound Studios
- Genre: Hard rock; alternative metal
- Length: 54:00
- Label: Sony Music Entertainment
- Producer: Wolfgang

Wolfgang chronology
Wurm (1997)	Serve in Silence (1999)	Acoustica (2000)

Singles from Serve in Silence
- 1. "Atomica" Released: 1999

Professional ratings
Review scores
Source	Rating
AllMusic	4.5/5 stars

Serve in Silence is the fourth studio album by Filipino rock band Wolfgang, released in 1999. In contrast to their previous record, Wurm, half of the tracks on Serve in Silence are sung in Tagalog.

== Awards and nominations ==
Serve in Silence won the Album of the Year and Listeners' Choice Awards at the 1999 NU107 Rock Awards. The video for the track "Atomica" was nominated for Best Group Video at the 2000 MTV Philippine Video Music Awards.

== Track listing ==
All tracks are written by Wolfgang, except where noted.

No.	Title	Writer(s)	Length
1.	"Atomica"		4:56
2.	"Man 98"		3:55
3.	"Hiwaga"		3:17
4.	"Anino"		6:24
5.	"Ratz"		3:27
6.	"Bassarabs Walk"		5:11
7.	"Serve in Silence"	M. Legarda, S. Artadi, L. Gemora	4:59
8.	"Catinamosh"		3:48
9.	"Tulisan"		2:22
10.	"Ilang Alon Ang Dala"		4:56
11.	"Masters of War"		4:49
12.	"Aquarius"		4:11
13.	"A Tonic Reprise"		1:49

== Personnel ==
Wolfgang

- Basti Artadi – vocals
- Manuel Legarda – guitar
- Mon Legaspi – bass
- Wolf Gemora – drums

Additional musician

- Boyet Aquino – drums (track 1,11,12)

Production and design

- Wolfgang – production, mixing
- Dennis Cham – production, engineering, mixing, mastering
- Mony Romana – executive production
- Angee Rozul – engineering, mixing, mastering
- Miguel Mari – art direction, design, photography
- Martin Mari – art direction, design
- Sebastian Artadi – photography
- Don Sepe – photography
- Cristina Castillo – photography
