= Grip Stand Throw =

Studio album by Sandwich
- Released: August 6, 1999
- Studio: Tracks Studios
- Genres: Alternative rock; alternative metal; nu metal; post-grunge
- Length: 50:40
- Labels: Greater East Asia Music & BMG Records (Pilipinas), Inc.
- Producers: Raimund Marasigan, Sancho

Sandwich chronology
Grip Stand Throw (1999)	4-Track Mind (2001)

Professional ratings
Review scores
Source	Rating
AllMusic	3/5 stars

Grip Stand Throw is the debut studio album released by the Filipino alternative rock band Sandwich in 1999. The band gained popularity because of its hit carrier single, "Butterfly Carnival". The album and the band won numerous awards due to the album. The album was also produced during Raimund Marasigan's tenure with the Eraserheads.

== Accolades ==
Publication	Country	Accolade	Year	Rank
Esquire Magazine	Philippines	10 Essential OPM Albums of the 1990s	2019	*

* denotes an unordered list

== Track listing ==
No.	Title	Length
1.	"Cheese Factor Set to 9"	2:45
2.	"Butterfly Carnival"	3:38
3.	"Paano Sasabihin?"	4:37
4.	"Alitaptap"	2:24
5.	"Faye"	2:55
6.	"Jetlag"	3:24
7.	"Freestyle Analog"	2:16
8.	"Klepto"	1:25
9.	"Grip Stand Throw"	1:52
10.	"Maybe"	5:07
11.	"Di Sinasadya"	3:45
12.	"Twinkle"	3:24
13.	"Toppings"	0:44
14.	"Sakyan"	2:54
15.	"Art Too Di Too"	3:35
16.	"Pachyderm 5"	5:54

== Personnel ==
- Marc Abaya - vocals, guitar, unclean vocals
- Raimund Marasigan – vocals, guitar, keyboards, synths, loops
- Diego Castillo - guitar, backup vocals
- Myrene Academia - bass
- Mike Dizon - drums

== Album Credits ==
- Executive Producer: Rudy Y. Tee
- A & R: Vic Valenciano & Romel Sanchez
- Recorded, Mixed, Edited & Mastered at: Tracks Studios
- Additional Recording by: Sancho & Raymund
- Mixed by: Sancho And Angee Rozul
