= Dong Abay =

Filipino musician (born 1971)

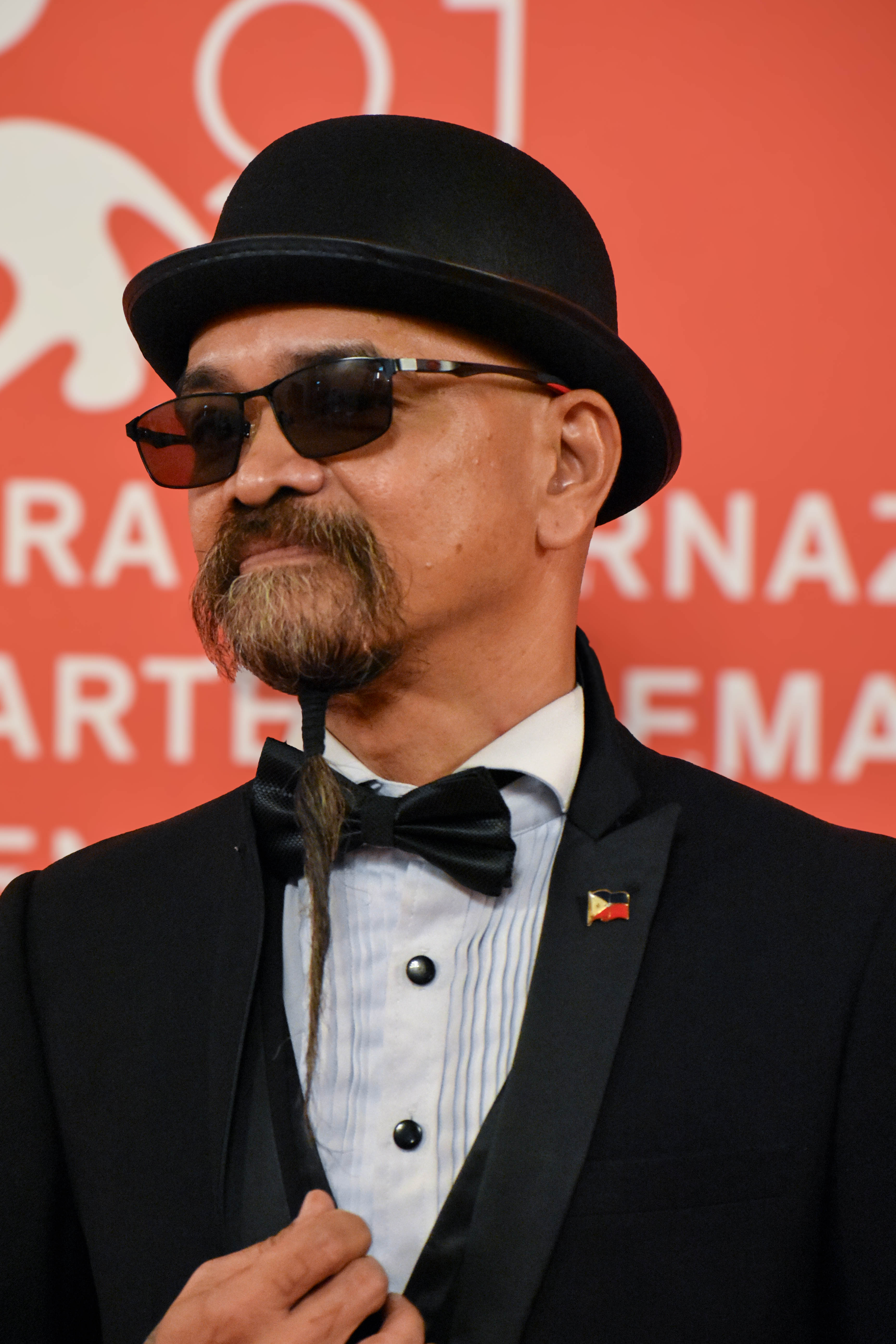
- Abay at the 81st Venice International Film Festival in 2024

Background information
- Born: Westdon Martin Abay; April 5, 1971 (age 55)
- Origin: Manila, Philippines
- Genres: Rock, pinoy rock, punk rock
- Occupation: Artist
- Instruments: Vocals, guitar
- Years active: 1992–present
- Formerly of: Yano, Pan, dongabay
- Website: myspace.com/dongabay D.A.M.O Facebook page Dong Abay Facebook page soundcloud.com/dongabay imgrum.net/dongabay

Westdon Martin Abay (born April 5, 1971), popularly known as Dong Abay, is a poet and a Pinoy rock musician. He was the founding member, songwriter and lead vocalist of the bands Yano, Pan, and dongabay, which are now all defunct. In 2005, he pursued a solo career as an independent artist by releasing an album entitled Sampol. In 2017, he formed a rock band named Dong Abay Music Organization or D.A.M.O. while having other endeavors such as a songwriting school.

== Biography ==
=== Personal life ===
Abay was born on April 5, 1971, in Manila, Philippines to Manuel Abay and Susana Martin.

In January 2021, Abay was accused of being the masked rioter holding a broom during the storming of the United States Capitol. Abay was in the Philippines at that time, and has decided to file cyber libel charges against his accusers.

=== Career ===
==== Yano days ====
In 1992, Dong Abay, Eric Gancio and Larry Mapolon met in Patatag, a progressive vocal ensemble. After a year, they decided to form a band called NG (pronounced as en-ji and derived from the Ng digraph of the Filipino alphabet) with percussionist Renmin Nadela. Abay and Gancio remained and recruited musical arranger and bassist, Onie Badiang to the group. Eventually, the band's name was renamed to Yano. They recorded their demo at the home studio of alternative artist Joey Ayala in June 1993. One of the tracks, "Kumusta Na?," ("How Are You?") a song about the "EDSA Revolution", found its way to a local radio station where the group was first heard. This paved the way for Yano to become active in the local club circuit. Mayrics, Club Dredd, 70s Bistro were among the first clubs that Yano performed in. Drummers for the band included Nowie Favila (Ang Grupong Pendong), Nonong Timbalopez (Put3Ska, Ex President's Combo), Jun Nogoy (Coffeebreak Island) and Harley Alarcon (Rizal Underground). In 1994, the band's self-titled debut album came out and spawned classic Filipino rock songs such as "Banal Na Aso, Santong Kabayo" ("Holy Dog, Saintly Horse"), "Tsinelas" ("Slippers") and "Esem" (wordplay for SM or Shoemart mall). This was followed by a string of successful concerts around the Philippine archipelago.

In 1994, at the height of Yano's popularity, Abay had to temporarily quit his schooling at the University of the Philippines Diliman, where he was an Arts and Letters student, to pursue a career in music. Yano released 2 more albums under BMG, a major label : "Bawal" ("Taboo") in 1996 and "Tara" ("C'mon") in 1997. The eponymous debut album was first released under Alpha Records but was later re-issued by BMG (now Sony Music Philippines).

==== Hiatus and formation of Pan ====
During the late 1990s, Abay suffered from clinical depression for nearly five years. After this stretch, which he had written songs during, he linked back up with Onie Badiang, former bassist of Yano, and the two would later go on to found the band Pan. In 2002 or 2003, they released an album titled Parnaso ng Payaso (transl. "A collection of poems by a clown"); the song "Hula" (transl. "Prediction") from this album would later win Best Folk/Pop Recording at the 2003 Awit Awards.

In early 2005, Abay left Pan to pursue an indie career, resulting in the band going inactive.

==== Solo career ====
In early 2005, Abay became an indie artist and initially released an EP called "Sampol" ("Sample") at the University of the Philippines as part of his undergraduate thesis. This work consists of acoustic tracks, which were later reborn as full-band pieces in "Filipino," released in May 2006. The album was produced by Robin Rivera, Abay's Art Studies professor in U.P. and album producer of The Eraserheads who eventually hired ex-Eraserheads Raimund Marasigan and Buddy Zabala to play in the entire album. "Flipino" proved Abay's relevance to Philippine music by releasing songs such as "Perpekto" ("Perfect"), "Bombardment" and "Tuyo" ("Dry")". A month before that, Abay finally earned his degree of Bachelor of Arts in Philippine Studies (Areas: Creative Writing in Filipino and Humanities) from the University of the Philippines after 18 years.

==== 2013–present ====
In 2013, he released a conceptual album called Rebulto ("Bust"), which focuses entirely on the Rizal Monument along Roxas Boulevard in Manila, and written from the perspective of Jose Rizal, considered one the Philippine National Heroes, for which the monument stand, in the present day. The lyrics are mostly written in the first person, except for a couple of tracks; notably, the first track "Kilometro Zero" ("Kilometer Zero") is a collation of facts about the Rizal Monument, all lifted from Wikipedia. (In the Philippines, the highway system uses the Rizal Monument, or kilometer zero as a reference for metric distance to any point in the country.) The album was also produced and performed by Raimund Marasigan and Buddy Zabala.

In 2017, he formed a band called Dong Abay Music Organization or D.A.M.O. and they plan to release an album entitled Humanidad funded through crowdsourcing. the album were released in October 2017. and a vinyl format were released in August 2021.

== Discography ==
=== Yano (album) ===
1. Kumusta Na (How are You?) – 3:28
2. Tsinelas (Slippers) – 2:44
3. State U – 2:47
4. Banal Na Aso, Santong Kabayo (Holy Dog, Saintly Horse) – 4:25
5. Trapo (Pejorative term for Traditional Politician;Tra+Po. Literally translates to "dust rag") - 3:23
6. Iskolar Ng Bayan (The Nation's Scholar) – 2:57
7. Kaka – 2:03
8. Esem (wordplay for SM) – 3:38
9. Travel Times - 4:47
10. Mc'Jo (wordplay for McDonald's and Jollibee) – 2:51
11. Coño Ka P're - 2:21
12. Ate (Big Sister) - 2;58
13. Senti (short for Sentimental) - 4:44
14. Naroon (There) - 3:16

=== Bawal (album) ===
1. Metro – 2:25
2. Dayo (Foreigner) – 4:15
3. Askal (Filipino wordplay for "Asong Kalye", literally means street dog) – 3:25
4. Bawal (Prohibited) – 3:48
5. Lahat (All/Everybody) – 4:58
6. Ate (Big Sister) – 2:59
7. Astig (Filipino slang for Cool) – 3:08
8. Sana (I Wish) – 5:07
9. Diosdiosan (Fake God) – 3:10
10. Pyutcha (Filipino slang for Son of a Bitch) – 4:23

=== Tara (Yano album) ===
All tracks by Dong Abay and Eric Gancio, except where noted.

1. Ako (Me) Eric Gancio – 04:48
2. Paalam Sampaguita (Goodbye Sampaguita) – 03:39
3. Tara (Let's Go) – 04:46
4. Kaklase (Classmate) – 04:45
5. Abno (short for Abnormal) – 04:36
6. Mercy – 04:27
7. Going Home – 04:30
8. Me Mama (There's A Man) Dong Abay, Eric Gancio and Onie Badiang – 04:37
9. Shobis (Showbiz) – 02:01
10. War Eric Gancio – 03:49)
11. Isa (One) – 02:35

=== Parnaso ng Payaso ===
1. Mabuhay! (Long Live!) - 3:37
2. Kahimanawari (God Grant) - 4:11
3. Rebolusyon (Revolution) - 4:36
4. Hula (Prediction) - 3:32
5. Kawatan (Thief) - 4:12
6. Dumpsite - 4:38
7. Eko (Echo) - 4:28
8. Gusto (Want) - 4:38
9. Precious - 3:44
10. Tayo (Stand Up) 2:59
11. Huling Hiling (Last Wish) - 2:59
12. Totoy T. - 3:21
13. Himig (Melody) - 2:35
14. Tagpuan (Tryst) - 4:23

=== Solo career ===
Sampol Album

1. Awit ng Kambing (Chant of the Goat) - 2:48
2. Kukote (Occiput) - 3:50
3. Perpekto (Perfect) - 4:23
4. Tuyo (Dry) - 3:50
5. Ay Buhay (Oh Life) - 2:44
6. Wwii - 3:23
7. Solb (Solve, worldplay for Solvent) - 4:53
8. Segundo (Second) - 4:35

Flipino Album

1. Espasyo (Space) - 3:30
2. Akrostik (Acrostic) - 1:32
3. Aba-Aba (Poor) - 2:18
4. Perpekto (Perfect) - 4:51
5. Kukote (Occiput) - 4:13
6. Awit ng Kambing (Chant of the Goat) - 3:32
7. Tuyo (Dry) - 3:42
8. Mateo Singko - 3:49
9. Dyad - (Two) 3:53
10. Bombardment - 2:31
11. Ay Buhay (Oh Life) - 4:14
12. Segundo (Second) - 4:57
13. Solb (Solve, worldplay for Solvent) - 5:06
14. Wwiii - 3:40

Rebulto Album

1. Kilometro Zero (Kilometre Zero) - 3:01
2. Kikilos (Act) - 3:03
3. Par Que - 3:01
4. Anonymous - 3:16
5. Rizal Day - 3:35
6. Bagumbayan - 5:59
7. Titigas (Harden) - 3:57

Others

1. Hikahos (Insufficiency) from the video-documentary "Ilehitimong Utang" (Illegitimate debts) - 2:19
2. Dasal (Prayer) from the album Balangiga 1901 with his previous band Pan - 4:41
3. Ang Kailangan Gawin (The Things We Must Do) from the album "Anti-Corruption Songwriting Competition Finalists", written by Gary Granada - 3:09
4. Casadores (Cazadores, Soldiers from Spain. Literally means hunters, huntsmen, shooters, or destroyers) from the album "[Rock] Supremo", with The Tanods - 3:23
5. Ama Namin (Acoustic) (The Lord's Prayer. Literally means Our Father) Written by Dong Abay for the Filipino crime-drama film "Honor Thy Father" by Erik Matti starring John Lloyd Cruz - 2:30
6. Ama Namin (The Lord's Prayer. Literally means Our Father) The orchestrated version for the Honor Thy Father film trailer at the Contemporary World Cinema premiere of the Toronto International Film Festival in Ontario, Canada - 2:21
7. Nasa Puso Ko (In My Heart. Inspired by the words & adapted from the popular music of Psalm 118:24, "This is the day that the Lord has made. Let us rejoice and be glad in it.") the first musical collaboration of Dong Abay & Lourd de Veyra - 1:38
8. Prometheus Unbound words by Jose F. Lacaba, 1973 and music by Dong Abay, 2015 - 6:24
9. Aleluya (Halleluyah) Filipino version of Leonard Cohen's "Hallelujah", translated by Carina Evangelista - 6:57

== Awards and nominations ==
Year	Award giving body	Category	Nominated work	Results
2007	MYX Music Awards	Favorite MYX Live Performance	—N/a	Nominated
