= Yano =

Filipino folk/punk rock band

- Origin: Metro Manila, Philippines
- Genres: Alternative rock; folk; punk rock; hard rock
- Years active: 1993–1998, 2006–present
- Labels: Alpha Records; BMG Rights Management; Sony Music Philippines Inc. (formerly known as BMG Records (Pilipinas), Inc.
- Members: Eric Gancio - vocals, lead guitars; Charlie Comendador - bass; Jan Najera - drums
- Past members: Dong Abay; Onie Badiang; Supporting musicians: Nowie Favila; Nonong Timbalopez; Harley Alarcon; Jun Nogoy; JR Madarang; Ronald Madarang
- Website: Official website (archived)

Yano is a Filipino folk/punk rock band formed in 1993. The band members were originally composed of Dong Abay on vocals and Eric Gancio on guitar. Onie Badiang later joined them to play bass. Nowie Favila was the usual drummer but declined to join the group due to commitments with Ang Grupong Pendong. Other drummers of the band included Nonong Timbalopez, Harley Alarcon and Jun Nogoy. The band got their name when Abay looked through an entry in "Talahulugang Pilipino", an old Tagalog dictionary. "Yano" in Tagalog means "simple", similar to modern Tagalog term "payák". In dialectal Tagalog, the term "yano" may also mean "extreme", and usually by extension, "kayanuhan" may also mean "state of being right quality, kind, size, class, etc." The term is often used by Tagalog speakers in the province of Quezon. The group disbanded in 1997 after Abay left the band. Eric Gancio reformed Yano in 2007.

In 2007, Eric Gancio revived Yano as a one-man band, although he continued to use sidemen as backing musicians for live performances. In 2013, Yano released their fourth studio album titled Talâ (Star). As of 2022, Yano's current members are composed of Eric Gancio (vocals, lead guitars), Charlie Comendador (bass), and Jan Najera (drums).

== History ==
On June 30, 1994, the band's self-titled debut album came out, with rock songs including "Banal Na Aso, Santong Kabayo". The band promoted the album through a series of appearances and gigs in various clubs and campuses, as well as a successful Radio tour.

=== Yano continues ===
In the middle of the recording of their third album Tara, Abay struggled with clinical depression and stayed in his bedroom for about three years. Gancio finished the album alone, singing the vocal tracks to have of the album's songs.

Abay came out of depression while writing new songs set into poetry. He and Badiang formed another band, Pan. They released their debut album entitled Parnaso ng Payaso in 2003. Pan was later disbanded because Abay went back to school in University of the Philippines Diliman. He released Sampol, an EP in 2005, which was later reborn into Flipino and released in May 2006. Badiang played bass for Filipino folk/rock band Asin.

=== Yano in Davao ===
Gancio returned to his homeland in Davao after finishing the recording of the third album Tara in 1998. In 2004, he released his solo album Sa Bandang Huli (At the Very End). Gancio did all the instruments in his indie-released album and mixed the music at his home in a PC-based software. In 2007, Gancio took into the band session Bassist Dave Ibao and Drummer Jan Najera. He said he would be releasing an album, which, according to Gancio, will be the "fourth Yano album" instead of his second album. Hence, in 2013, Yano released a fourth album titled Talâ (Star) under Yano Records. The band is still based in Davao City.

In September 2014, Yano released its fifth album Ya Hindi No under Yano Records. Yano has just launched it during P FEST UK on the last week of the same month in Leeds and Romford. In 2022, Jan Najera rejoined the band, together with Charlie Comendador as the new bassist.

== Music ==
Yano's music is a fusion of western elements into Filipino ethnic music. It is also known for their political and social themes. Their songs censure religious hypocrites like in Banal Na Aso, Santong Kabayo (Tagalog for Holy Dog, Saintly Horse), corrupt politicians in Trapo (colloquial, pejorative acronym for "traditional politicians", also literally translates to "dust rag"), the lingo of the Philippine's elite in Coño Ka P’re ("You're a coño") and abusive capitalists in Mc’Jo (alluding to the fastfood chains McDonald's and Jollibee.

Yano's songs also narrate the situation of Philippine society during the 1990s. Kumusta Na? ("How are you?") discusses the condition of the Filipino masses after the 1986 EDSA Revolution while the novelty-styled song Kaka tells a story of a person named Kaka, who is having difficulty in finding things in the dark after a power outage, a reference to the frequent blackouts in the Philippines during the early 1990s. The song Bawal ("prohibited") speaks about the effects of rules or laws with excessive restrictions to the point where it leads to suppression of freedom and love. Abno, also known as Abnormal Environmental, tackles the environment while Kaklase ("classmate") focuses on students facing maltreatment by their teachers. Another social relevant song, Mercy, tells about the story of a crazy peddler in the Philippines known as a taong grasa ("greasy person").

== Discography ==
=== Studio albums ===
Year	Title	Label
1994	Yano	Alpha Records and then re-issued by Sony Music in 1998
1996	Bawal	Alpha Records and then re-issued by Sony Music in 1998
1997	Tara	Sony Music
2001	Best of Yano	Sony Music
2013	Tala	Yano Records
2014	Ya Hindi No	Yano Records

== Singles ==
- "Banal Na Aso, Santong Kabayo"
- "Esem"
- "Tsinelas"

== Awards ==
Year	Award giving body	Category	Nominated work	Results
1994	NU Rock Awards	Best New Artist(shared with The Youth	—N/a	Won
1996	NU Rock Awards	Best Album Packaging	"Metro"	Won
1999	"12th Awit Awards"	Best Rock Recording	"Kaklase"	Won
