= Debris (Sandwich album) =

Studio album by Sandwich
- Released: February 12, 2015
- Genre: Rock; alternative rock
- Length: 40:31
- Label: PolyEast Records

Sandwich chronology
Fat Salt & Flame (2013)	Debris (2015)

Singles from Debris
- 1. "Kagulo" Released: January 1, 2015; 2. "Buhangin" Released: May 27, 2015; 3. "Outlaw" Released: April 15, 2016

Debris is the eighth studio album by Filipino alternative rock band Sandwich, released on February 12, 2015 through PolyEast Records. It was launched on February 25, 2015 at the UP Town Center in Quezon City, Philippines.

== Reception ==
Professional ratings
Review scores
Source	Rating
ABS-CBN News	5/5 stars
Pinoytuner	90%

Debris received praise from music critics. Jackie Dosmanos of ABS-CBN News said that the album pushes the boundary set up with Sandwich's 2006 release, Five on the Floor. "At times, their driving tunes achieve muscular lift-off like a less grandiose post-metal outfit and it’s always the powerful hooks and melodic fills that glue your undivided attention. 'Debris," in spite of insinuations of fragments, decay, post-disaster left-over, is really Pinoy indie rock at its peak." Dosmanos gave the album a rating of 5/5 stars.

=== Accolades ===
The music video for "Kagulo", directed by Quark Henares, was nominated for Best Rock Video at the Myx Music Awards 2016.

== Track listing ==
No.	Title	Length
1.	"Border Crossing"	3:08
2.	"Amphibious"	4:14
3.	"Kagulo"	3:30
4.	"Buhangin"	4:08
5.	"Ocular"	3:41
6.	"Outlaw"	3:26
7.	"Napapanahon"	3:52
8.	"Balintawak"	4:58
9.	"Bato-Bato Pik"	4:24
10.	"Sunrise"	5:10
Total length:		40:31
