= Selos =

Selos may refer to:

- "Selos" (song), a 2023 song by Shaira
- "Selos", a song from S Marks the Spot
- "Selos", a song by The Vowels They Orbit
