= Kjwan =

Filipino rock band

- Origin: Metro Manila, Philippines
- Genres: Alternative metal; hard rock; nu metal; alternative rock; pop rock; post-grunge
- Years active: 2003–present
- Labels: MCA; PolyEast/Barnyard; Sony Music
- Members: Marc Abaya; Kelley Mangahas; EO Marcos; Louis Isok
- Past members: Boogie Romero; J-Hoon Balbuena; Jorel Corpus; Enrique de Dios; Pao Santiago

Kjwan is a Filipino hard rock band formed in 2003 by former Sandwich guitarist and lead vocalist Marc Abaya and Dicta License bassist Kelley Mangahas.

== History ==
Long-time friends and former high school bandmates Marc Abaya (vocals) and Federico Kelley Mangahas (bass) got together with fellow Ateneans Jorel Corpus (guitar) and J-hoon Balbuena (drums) to form the band's initial lineup. In 2004, Roberto Miguel "Boogie" Romero (guitar), another high school friend and former bandmate of Marc and Kelley, joined the lineup. They released their self-titled debut album in 2004 with their carrier hit single “Daliri” which gained constant airplay on radio stations and television.

Kjwan released their second album, 2StepMarv three years later under Barnyard Music.

The band won Favorite Indie Artist in the local music channel MYX’s music awards night. Their video “Pintura” nabbed “Favorite Guest Appearance” with the help of a seasoned actress, Chin-Chin Gutierrez. They were also featured for a month on MTV Pilipinas in December 2006. They enjoyed a month-long feature as Yahoo Southeast Asia's band of the month and another month-long feature as “Celebrity VJs” in MYX for the whole month of April 2006. They also got nominated in 6 categories in the 2007 NU Rock Awards for Artist of the Year, Best Live Act, Album of the Year, Producer of the Year (with Angee Rozul), Vocalist of the Year (Marc Abaya) and Guitarist of the Year (Boogie Romero). 2Step Marv was a massive success for the band as they cemented themselves with releases that included: Pintura, Sa Ilalim, Shai, Invitation and One Look.

At this time, the band also had the chance to show what Philippine rock is made of to various countries abroad. They headlined HK-Live, in Central, HK back in October 2007 in front of a packed Fringe Club with fans from many nationalities. HK-Live is a monthly showcase of the Hottest Acts around Asia in HK's Fringe Club. They were also part of the Annual Baybeats Music Festival in Singapore and the HUSH Music Festival in Macau, China.

One of their biggest breakthroughs was winning the grand prize in the Asian and Philippine leg in IKON ASEAN Competition. Held in Putrajaya, Malaysia and watched by hundreds of thousands all over the region, their performance made an impact to the Asian Music Community. Kjwan beat thirty other bands from both the Philippines and in South East Asia.

Kjwan released their third album entitled 13 Seconds to Love. Inspired by the fact that a great song can be determined in just thirteen seconds, the band brought this along in their song writing with love as the common theme. The album was also the first one that was released first on a purely digital format when it was preloaded in official releases of Nokia 5800 XpressMusic in the Philippines, six months before the actual physical release of the album.

== Band members ==
=== Current members ===
- Marc Abaya – lead vocals, rhythm and lead guitar (2003–present)
- Kelley Mangahas – bass guitar (2003–present)
- Eo Marcos – drums (2012–present), backing vocals (2023–present)
- Louis Isok – lead guitar, backing vocals (2022–present)

=== Former members ===
- Boogie Romero – lead guitar, co-lead & backing vocals (2004–2023)
- Marinito "J-Hoon" Balbuena – drums, backing vocals (2003–2009)
- Jorel Corpus – guitars, percussion, backing vocals (2003–2010)
- Enrique "Inky" de Dios – keyboards, keytar, synthesizers, percussion, backing vocals (2011–2023)
- Pao Santiago – drums (2010–2012)

=== Session musicians ===
- Bryan Makasiar – drums
- Wendell Garcia – drums
- Paolo Manuel – drums
- Kurt Floresca – drums
- Bea Lao – drums

== Discography ==
Studio Albums

| Year | Title | Label |
|---|---|---|
| 2004 | Kjwan | Sony Music Philippines |
| 2006 | 2StepMarv | EMI Philippines/Barnyard Music Philippines |
| 2009 | 13 Seconds to Love | MCA Music Philippines |
| 2012 | Kjwan IV Volume One | MCA Music Philippines |
| 2014 | Kjwan IV Volume Two | MCA Music Philippines |

Singles

| Year | Song | Album |
|---|---|---|
| 2004 | Daliri | Kjwan |
| 2004 | Boomerang | Kjwan |
| 2005 | Surface | Kjwan |
| 2005 | Twilight | Kjwan |
| 2006 | Pintura | 2StepMarv |
| 2006 | Sa Ilalim | 2StepMarv |
| 2006 | One Look | 2StepMarv |
| 2006 | Invitation | 2StepMarv |
| 2006 | Shai | 2StepMarv |
| 2009 | Pause | 13 Seconds to Love |
| 2009 | Meron Ba | 13 Seconds to Love |
| 2009 | Lifeline | 13 Seconds to Love |
| 2012 | Walang Kaso | Kjwan IV Volume One |
| 2014 | My Axis | Kjwan IV Volume Two |
| 2014 | Fall From The Sun | Kjwan IV Volume Two |
| 2014 | Aking Pangako | Kjwan IV Volume Two |
| 2016 | HyperConnected | Kjwan IV Volume Three (Unreleased album) |
| 2024 | Dahas | TBA |
| 2024 | Sa Huli | TBA |
| 2025 | Mula Sa Katahimikan | TBA |
| 2026 | Ipagpatawad | TBA |
| 2026 | Hawak Ang Iyong Kamay | TBA |
| 2027 | Kaibigan | TBA |

Unreleased songs

| Year | Song | Album |
|---|---|---|
| 2005 | Get With Me (Demo) | 2StepMarv |
| 2010 | Picture Lady (Demo) | Dagim (Original Soundtrack) |
| 2016 | Red Bleeds To Blue (Demo) | Kjwan IV Volume Three (Unreleased album) |

Other Appearances

| Year | Song | Album |
|---|---|---|
| 2003 | Drizzle (Helltop Remix) | Rx Band Breakout Finalists CD |
| 2005 | A Different Kind | ROK ON! Music Inspired by the Ragnarok Online Game |
| 2007 | Daliri | LIVE AND RAW (6UG Live CD) |
| 2009 | Pause | Kerplunk! DEFIANT |
| 2009 | 13 Seconds to Love | Nokia 5800 Express Music Phone MCA Music |
| 2012 | Kjwan IV volume 1 | Independent |
| 2014 | Kjwan IV volume 2 | Independent |

== Awards and achievements ==
Miscellaneous and Other Awards:

- Ani ng Dangal Award from The Office of the President and The National Commission for Culture and the Arts(NCCA)

| Year | Award giving body | Category | Nominated work | Results |
|---|---|---|---|---|
| 2004 | NU Rock Awards | Best New Artist | —N/a | Nominated |
| 2004 | NU Rock Awards | Best Video | "Daliri" | Nominated |
| 2004 | NU Rock Awards | Best Album Packaging | Kjwan | Nominated |
| 2004 | NU Rock Awards | Best Drummer | (for J-Hoon Balbuena) | Nominated |
| 2005 | MTV Pilipinas Video Music Awards | Favorite New Artist | —N/a | Nominated |
| 2005 | MTV Pilipinas Video Music Awards | Best Video | "Daliri" | Nominated |
| 2007 | Ikon Asean | IKON ASEAN Champion (Group Category) | —N/a | Won |
| 2007 | MYX Music Awards | Favorite Indie Artist | —N/a | Won |
| 2007 | MYX Music Awards | Favorite MYX Live Performance | —N/a | Nominated |
| 2007 | NU Rock Awards | Artist of the Year | —N/a | Nominated |
| 2007 | NU Rock Awards | Best Live Act | —N/a | Nominated |
| 2007 | NU Rock Awards | Album of the Year | 2StepMarv | Nominated |
| 2007 | NU Rock Awards | Producer of the Year | (with Angee Rozul) | Nominated |
| 2007 | NU Rock Awards | Vocalist of the Year | (for Marc Abaya) | Nominated |
| 2007 | NU Rock Awards | Guitarist of the Year | (for Boogie Romero) | Nominated |
| 2008 | Awit Awards | International Achievement Award | (Winner of the group category in the 1st Ikon ASEAN competition) | Won |
| 2008 | MYX Music Awards | Favorite Indie Artist | —N/a | Nominated |
| 2009 | NU Rock Awards | Artist of the Year | —N/a | Nominated |
| 2009 | NU Rock Awards | Album of the Year | 13 Seconds to Love | Nominated |
| 2009 | NU Rock Awards | Vocalist of the Year | (for Marc Abaya) | Nominated |
| 2009 | NU Rock Awards | Guitarist of the Year | (for Boogie Romero) | Nominated |
| 2009 | NU Rock Awards | Bassist of the Year | (for Kelley Mangahas) | Nominated |
| 2009 | NU Rock Awards | Drummer of the Year | (for Jhoon Balbuena) | Nominated |
| 2009 | NU Rock Awards | Song of the Year | "Lifeline and 13 Seconds to Love" | Nominated |
| 2009 | NU Rock Awards | Best Album Packaging | 13 Seconds to Love | Nominated |
| 2009 | NU Rock Awards | Best Music Video | "Lifeline" | Nominated |
| 2009 | NU Rock Awards | Producer of the Year | (with Pat Jalbuena) | Nominated |
| 2018 | Wish Music Awards | Wishclusive Urban Performance of the Year | "One Look" | Nominated |
