= Thanks to the Moon's Gravitational Pull =

Thanks To The Moon's Gravitational Pull

Studio album by Sandwich
- Released: November 2003 (First Edition); July 30, 2004 (Special Edition)
- Genre: Alternative rock; nu metal; hard rock; post-grunge; post-punk
- Length: 1:07:10
- Label: Play for Serve Records (First edition); EMI Philippines (Special edition)

Sandwich chronology
4-Track Mind (2001)	Thanks To The Moon's Gravitational Pull (2003)	Five on the Floor (2006)

Thanks to the Moon's Gravitational Pull is the third studio album by Filipino alternative rock band Sandwich, released in 2003. The album contains the singles "Right Now", "2 Trick Pony" and Nahuhulog. It was the last album featuring Marc Abaya as the band's lead vocalist. This was the first Sandwich album initially released independently and also the special edition of the album is the first Sandwich album released under EMI Philippines.

The special edition of the album contains the music videos of "2 Trick Pony and "Thanks to the Moon" and remixes of some songs in the album.

== Track listing ==
=== Disc one ===
1. "Astroholiday" - 4:07
2. "2 Trick Pony" - 3:57
3. "For Your Consideration" - 3:02
4. "Homerun" - 3:55
5. "Masilungan" -4:19
6. "Nahuhulog" - 3:31
7. "Not This Time" - 3:27
8. "Return To Center" - 3:54
9. "Right Now" - 4:41
10. "Scared Shitless" - 4:32
11. "Surrounded By Dogs" - 4:40
12. "Thanks to the Moon - 4:29

=== Disc two ===
The second disc is only included in the special edition of the album which was released through EMI in 2004.

==== Bonus Songs ====
1. "Not This Time (Version Fashown)" - 3:25
2. "2 Trick Pony (Acoustic)" - 3:48
3. "Nahuhulog (Wolfmann vs. Buddy mix)" - 4:41
4. "Right Now (Sunfunk Mix)" - 6:49

==== Bonus Videos ====
1. "2 Trick Pony"
2. "Nahuhulog"

== Personnel ==
Sandwich

- Marc Abaya - vocals, guitar
- Raimund Marasigan – vocals, guitar, keyboards
- Diego Castillo - guitar, backup vocals
- Myrene Academia - bass
- Mike Dizon - drums
