= Contra Tiempo =

Studio album by Sandwich
- Released: January 2011
- Recorded: Sound Creation Studio
- Genre: Rock; alternative rock
- Length: 43:21
- Label: PolyEast Records
- Producer: Buddy Zabala

Sandwich chronology
<S> Marks the Spot (2008)	Contra Tiempo (2011)	Fat Salt & Flame (2013)

Contra Tiempo is the sixth studio album released by Filipino alternative rock band Sandwich in 2011. The album contains the singles "Putik", which is inspired by Typhoon Ondoy (international name: Ketsana) and its effects, and "Lakad". The album name, which roughly translates to against the beat, comes from a line in the song "Sulputin". This is their first album with no English songs. There was an error in printing, listing "Dispalinghado" as track number 4 instead of "Stranded".

== Track listing ==
No.	Title	Length
1.	"Lapit! Lapit! Lapit!"	4:40
2.	"Lakad"	3:59
3.	"Takbo"	2:14
4.	"Stranded"	4:21
5.	"Pera Pera"	3:40
6.	"Sugatan"	3:33
7.	"Putik"	4:43
8.	"Sulputin"	2:53
9.	"Bisikleta"	2:57
10.	"Downhill"	2:51
11.	"Dispalinghado"	4:08
12.	"Siesta"	3:22
Total length:		43:21

== Personnel ==
- Raymund Marasigan - Vocals, guitars, harmonica, melodica, keyboards
- Mong Alcaraz - guitars, vocals
- Diego Castillo - guitars, vocals
- Myrene Academia - bass, vocals
- Mike Dizon - Drums, Vocals

== Album Credits ==
- Arranged & Performed by:Sandwich
- Recorded by: Shinji Tanaka & Hazel Pascua
- Mixed and Mastered by: Shinji Tanaka at Sound Creation Studios
- Additional Back Up Vocals: Buddy Zabala, Atari Academia, Shouzan Tanaka
- Tambourine by: Robert Javier
- Catering by: Acel
