= Fat Salt & Flame =

Studio album by Sandwich
- Released: April 12, 2013
- Genre: Rock; alternative rock
- Length: 35:31
- Label: PolyEast Records

Sandwich chronology
Contra Tiempo (2010)	Fat Salt & Flame (2013)	Debris (2015)

Fat Salt & Flame is the seventh studio album by Filipino alternative rock band Sandwich, released on April 12, 2013 by PolyEast Records. The album also marks the band's 15th anniversary.

== Accolades ==
Year	Ceremony	Nominated work	Recipient(s)	Category	Result
2013	Awit Awards	"Back for More"	Sandwich	Best Performance by a Group Recording Artist	Nominated
2013	Awit Awards	"New Romancer"	Sandwich	Music Video of the Year	Nominated
2013	Awit Awards	Fat Salt & Flame	Inksurge (Graphic Designer & Album Concept); RA Rivera, Dareen Baylon, and Inksurge (Photography)	Best Album Package	Nominated

== In other media ==
The song "Mayday" was used in the film Ang Nawawala. "Kidlat", on the other hand, was used in the eponymous superhero television series aired on TV5.

== Track listing ==
No.	Title	Length
1.	"Fat Salt n Flame"	4:10
2.	"Back for More"	2:40
3.	"Sleepwalker"	3:25
4.	"Pray for Today"	5:16
5.	"The Week After"	3:41
6.	"Mayday"	3:47
7.	"Kidlat"	4:14
8.	"New Romancer"	3:21
9.	"Manhid"	4:57
Total length:		35:31
