= Faithfully (TV series) =

2012 Philippine television drama series

- Title card
- Genre: Drama
- Developed by: R.J. Nuevas
- Written by: Lobert Villela; Ma. Cristina Velasco; Abner Tulagan
- Directed by: Mike Tuviera
- Creative director: Jun Lana
- Starring: Maxene Magalona; Michelle Madrigal; Isabel Oli; Isabelle Daza; Vaness del Moral
- Theme music composer: Venne Saturno; Odette Quesada (lyrics); Bodjie Dasig (music)
- Opening theme: "Ayoko na Sana" by Jonalyn Viray
- Country of origin: Philippines
- Original language: Tagalog
- No. of episodes: 80

Production
- Executive producer: Carolyn G. Galve
- Production locations: Manila, Philippines
- Cinematography: Nonong Legaspi
- Camera setup: Multiple-camera setup
- Running time: 30–45 minutes
- Production company: GMA Entertainment TV

Original release
- Network: GMA Network
- Release: June 18 – October 5, 2012

Faithfully is a 2012 Philippine television drama series broadcast by GMA Network. Directed by Mike Tuviera, it stars Maxene Magalona, Michelle Madrigal, Isabel Oli, Vaness del Moral and Isabelle Daza. It premiered on June 18, 2012 on the network's Afternoon Prime line up. The series concluded on October 5, 2012, with a total of 80 episodes.

The series is streaming online on YouTube.

== Cast and characters ==
Cast

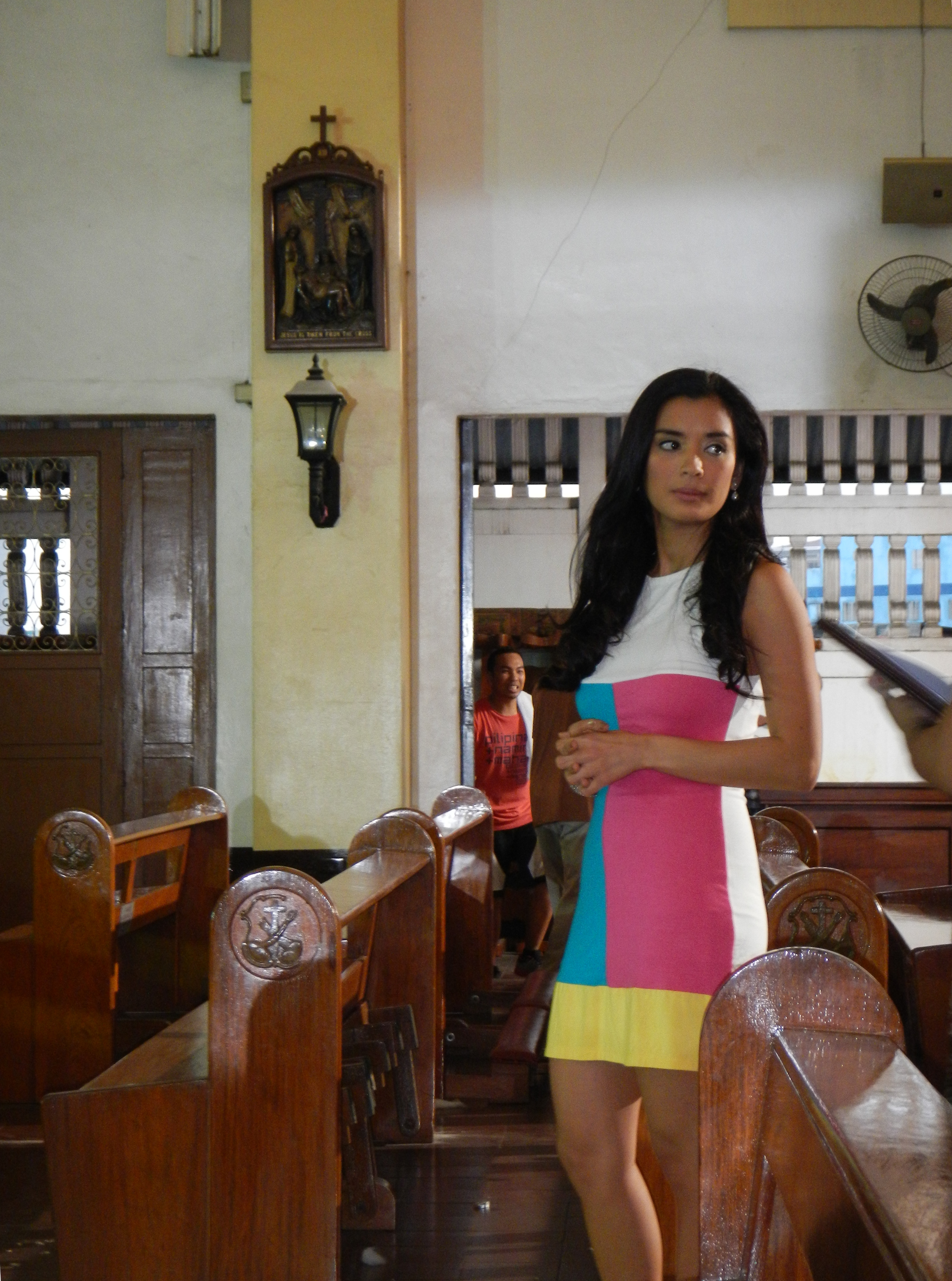
Michelle Madrigal

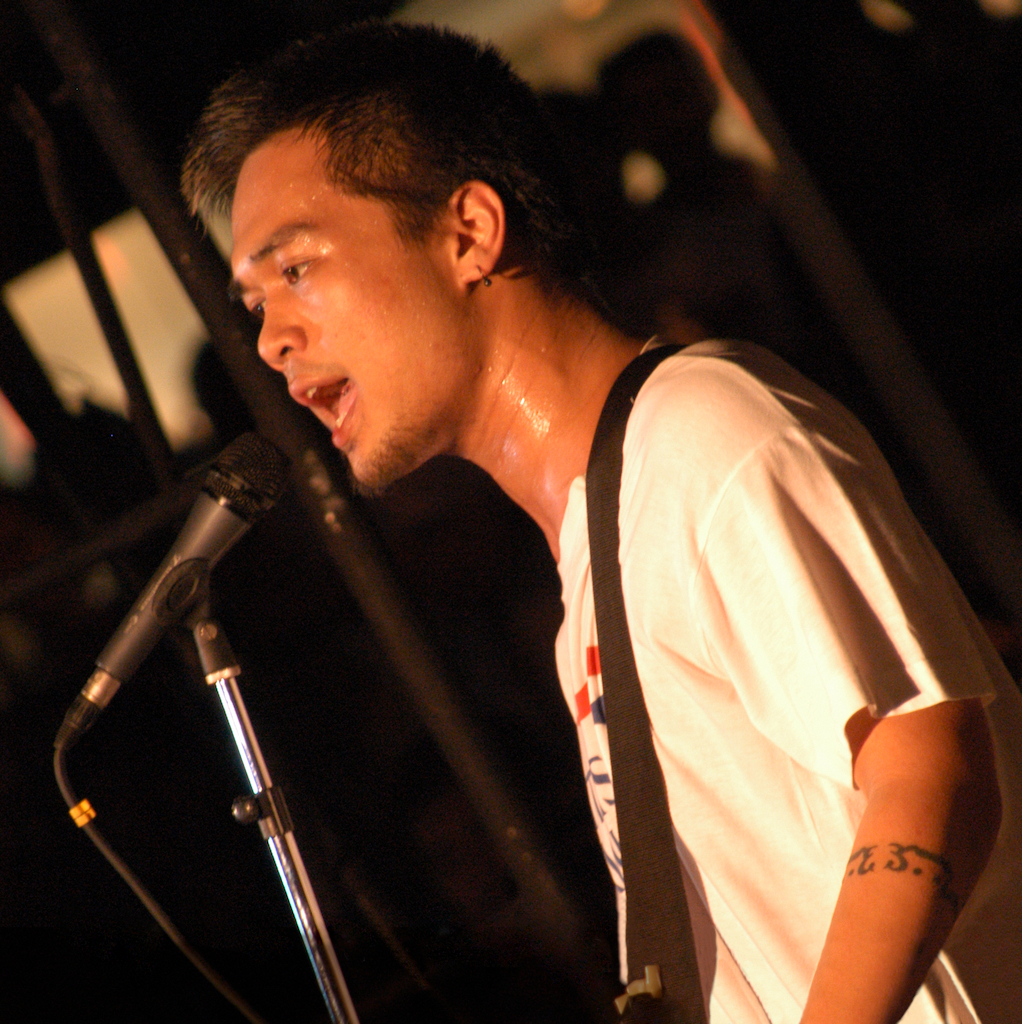
Marc Abaya

Lead cast

- Maxene Magalona as Stella Mariano-Quillamor/Escanio
- Michelle Madrigal as Luchie Trajano-Quillamor
- Isabel Oli as Megan Briones
- Isabelle Daza as Misha Villar
- Vaness del Moral as Dina Carvajal

Supporting cast

- Mike Tan as Perry Escanio
- Marc Abaya as Kevin Quillamor
- Will Devaughn as Luke Gallanosa
- Kevin Santos as Edjie Miranda
- Victor Aliwalas as Dan Belmonte
- Chanda Romero as Amanda Quillamor
- Timmy Cruz as Gloria Mariano
- Miggs Cuaderno as Miggy Quillamor
- Diva Montelaba as Osang
- Jamaica Olivera as Shelby Quillamor
- Rez Cortez as Fidel Mariano / Fidel Saavedra
- Bing Davao as Charles Quillamor
- Say Alonzo as Carmina Escanio

== Production ==
Principal photography concluded in September 2012.

== Ratings ==
According to AGB Nielsen Philippines' Mega Manila household television ratings, the pilot episode of Faithfully earned a 14.6% rating. The final episode scored a 23.1% rating.
