= Aswang (2011 film) =

Film by Jerrold Tarog

- Theatrical release poster
- Directed by: Jerrold Tarog
- Story by: Jerrold Tarog; Aloy Adlawan
- Based on: Aswang (1992) by Peque Gallaga
- Produced by: Lily Y. Monteverde
- Starring: Lovi Poe; Paulo Avelino; Jillian Ward; Marc Abaya; Precious Lara Quigaman; Joem Bascon; Niña Jose; Albie Casiño
- Cinematography: Mackie Galvez
- Edited by: Aleks Castañeda
- Music by: Jerrold Tarog
- Production company: Regal Entertainment
- Distributed by: Regal Entertainment
- Release date: November 2, 2011
- Running time: 110 minutes
- Country: Philippines
- Languages: Filipino; English
- Box office: ₱31 million (US$722,156.00)

Aswang is a 2011 Filipino action horror film based on the Filipino mythical creature that is a shapeshifting monster usually possessing a combination of the traits of either a vampire, a ghoul, a witch, or different species. The film is directed and co-written by Jerrold Tarog. It stars Lovi Poe, Paulo Avelino, Albie Casiño, Jillian Ward, Marc Abaya and Niña Jose. The film is a remake of Peque Gallaga's 1992 film of the same name.

The film features a type of aswang called "Abwak". It can transform from human to a raven-like creature that could fly and move underground as it stalks its victim. The film received generally positive reviews from critics, praising its cinematography and narrative, particularly Lovi Poe's performance.

== Plot ==
Gabriel and Ahnia flee from three hitmen who murdered their family. Attempting to reach their relatives for help, they become lost and arrive in a town plagued by attacks from unknown creatures. During one attack, they are rescued by Hasmin, a resident of a private plantation, who takes them to her blind elderly foster mother, Guada. Guada explains that the creatures are Abuwaks, a type of aswang that resemble humans, burrow underground and can transform into raven-like birds. The corrupt mayor secretly cooperates with the Abuwaks, accepting money in exchange for keeping the town underdeveloped and uninformed.

The three killers—Gido, Queenie and Daniel—arrive to complete their mission. Daniel, who is reluctant because their employer Eddie is holding his family hostage, repeatedly encounters Hasmin. As the killers approach, Hasmin hides the children in the plantation, unaware that it is an Abuwak nest and that she is herself a Bangkilan, a higher-ranking aswang capable of transforming humans into Abuwaks. Although she rejects her heritage, she remains benevolent towards humans.

The killers infiltrate the plantation. Queenie finds the children but is captured and tortured by the Abuwaks. She allows Gabriel and Ahnia to escape, while Hasmin refuses Moises's order to eat Queenie and instead breaks her neck. Gido and Daniel encounter the other Abuwaks and retreat, with Gido calling Eddie for reinforcements. Hasmin finds the children, but they are recaptured. Moises declares that they will be eaten the following day, when Hasmin is also due to marry him.

Hasmin secretly asks Daniel to help rescue the children. When two Abuwaks enter the town searching for Daniel and Gido, Hasmin transforms to create a diversion, enabling Daniel to escape and Gido to kill the creatures. The terrified townspeople evacuate, threatening the Abuwaks' survival as their numbers dwindle. Gido and Eddie's reinforcements subsequently attack the plantation, allowing Daniel to rescue Gabriel and Ahnia and disrupting Hasmin's wedding.

During their escape, an Abuwak mortally wounds Daniel and Ahnia is recaptured. Daniel tells Hasmin that he cannot die because he must still save his family from Eddie. Hasmin reluctantly uses her unique ability to transform him into an Abuwak, saving his life. Together, they defeat Moises and escape with Ahnia. Meanwhile, Gido and his team kill many Abuwaks before being overwhelmed; Gido detonates a grenade while being eaten, killing himself and several creatures.

Outside the plantation, Eddie corners Daniel, Hasmin, Gabriel and Ahnia and reveals that he has already ordered his men to kill Daniel's family. Daniel and Hasmin transform into Abuwaks and kill Eddie and his henchmen. Gabriel and Ahnia remain with Guada while Daniel and Hasmin return to his hometown.

== Cast ==
=== Main cast ===
- Lovi Poe as Hasmin
- Paulo Avelino as Daniel
- Albie Casiño as Gabriel
- Jillian Ward as Ahnia

=== Supporting cast ===
- Marc Abaya as Gido
- Niña Jose as Queenie
- Gigi Escalante as Old Guada
- Joem Bascon as Efren
- Precious Lara Quigaman as Stella
- Anna Vicente as Isabel
- Bembol Roco as Moises
- Nonie Buencamino as Eddie
- Rolando Inocencio as Mang Carding

=== Additional cast ===
- Ryan Idica as Bong
- Paul D. Villamor as Frankie Allan
- Miguel Ramirez as Ato
- Lani Tapia as Hilda
- Archie Adamos as Anton
- Gerald Dy as Daniel (10)
- Lianne Valentin as Hasmin (13)
- Emil Meily as Lito Arguelles
- Valerie Bondoc as Mrs. Arguelles
- Janna Tiangco as Mikaela
- Gerhard Acao as Ruel
- Sue Ramirez as Young Stella
- Kalila Aguilos as Young Guada
- Jake Macapagal as Manuel

== Reception ==
=== Box office ===
The film opened at 110 screens earning ₱22.9 million on its opening weekend. According to Box Office Mojo, The film reduced to 70 screens and earned ₱29 million on its second week of showing. The film earned ₱31 million on its whole theatrical run.

=== Critical reception ===
Aswang received generally positive reviews from critics, praising its cinematography and narrative, as well as praising the performance of Lovi Poe.

- Earl Villanueva from PEP states in his review that "Aswang is another proof of the Filipino movie industry's excellence in the horror genre, which should really be the case since we have a rich source of materials in our myths and legends and we have great love affair with the paranormal and everything unexplained."
- Ria Limjap from Spot.ph gave a positive review saying that "This intelligent movie will compel the audience to think along with it—just as much as it will entertain, fascinate, and provide much needed escape."
- Phillip Cu-Unjieng from Philippine Star describe the film as "...heady, atmospheric foray into the folklore of aswangs and creatures that go bump in the night... and 'road bump' in the fields."

== Accolades ==
Year	Award giving body	Category	Recipient	Result
2012	28th PMPC Star Awards for Movies	Movie of the Year	Aswang	Nominated
2012	28th PMPC Star Awards for Movies	Movie Director of the Year	Jerrold Tarog	Nominated
2012	28th PMPC Star Awards for Movies	Movie Child Performer of the Year	Jillian Ward	Won
2012	28th PMPC Star Awards for Movies	New Movie Actor of the Year	Albie Casiño	Nominated
2012	28th PMPC Star Awards for Movies	Movie Original Screenplay of the Year	Aloy Adlawan & Jerrold Tarog	Nominated
2012	28th PMPC Star Awards for Movies	Movie Editor of the Year	Aleks Castaneda	Nominated
