= Marc Abaya =

Filipino singer-songwriter, actor, model, TV host, and VJ (born 1979)

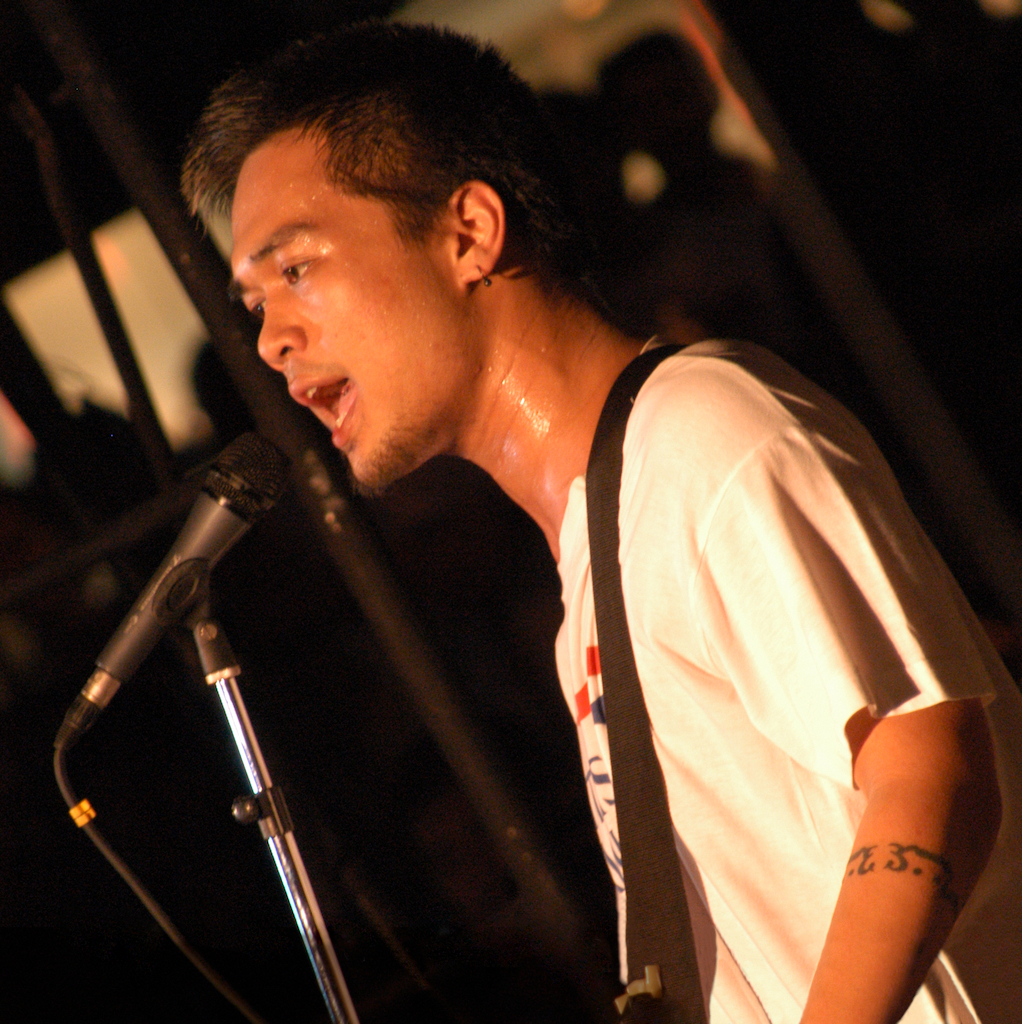
- Abaya in 2003

Background information
- Born: Ramon Marcelino Diaz Abaya; November 3, 1979 (age 46)
- Origin: Philippines
- Genres: Alternative metal; hard rock; post-grunge
- Occupations: Singer-songwriter; actor; model; TV host; VJ
- Years active: 1996–present
- Label: Star Magic
- Member of: Kjwan
- Formerly of: Shirley Beans; Sandwich

Ramon Marcelino "Marc" Diaz Abaya (born November 3, 1979), is a Filipino singer-songwriter, actor, model, TV host, and VJ known for his work in alternative rock and television. He began his music career as a member of Shirley Beans before joining the original lineup of the alternative rock band Sandwich in 1998 as vocalist and guitarist, contributing to early albums such as Grip Stand Throw (1998), 4-Track Mind (2001), and Thanks to the Moon’s Gravitational Pull (2003). He left the band in 2005.

He later joined the rock band Kjwan, formed in 2003, and also worked as a video jockey for MTV Philippines. In addition to his music career, he has collaborated with artists such as Gloc-9 on the song "Tsinelas sa Putikan".

As an actor, he appeared in television series including Ligaw na Bulaklak, Your Song (both 2008), and Faithfully (2012), and hosted programs such as It's Showtime segments and Pilipinas Got More Talent. He also acted in films like Dagim (2010), Aswang (2011), and later appeared in series including FPJ’s Ang Probinsyano, The Iron Heart (2022–2023), Roja (2025–2026) and Blood vs Duty (2026).

== Career ==
=== Musical career ===
Abaya was a member of band Shirley Beans before becoming part of the original lineup of the alternative rock Sandwich in 1998 as vocalist and guitarist, alongside Eraserheads drummer Raimund Marasigan, Diego Castillo, Myrene Academia, and Mike Dizon. Abaya provided vocals on three of the band's early albums: Grip Stand Throw (1998), 4-Track Mind (2001), and Thanks to the Moon's Gravitational Pull (2003). He left the band in 2005.

Abaya, along with Dicta License bassist Kelley Mangahas and Boogie Romero, became a member of the rock band Kjwan, which was formed in 2003 and is known for its iconic track "Daliri." That same year, he also ventured into becoming a video jockey on MTV Philippines.

In 2013, he collaborated with Gloc-9 on the song "Tsinelas sa Putikan", for the album Liham at Lihim under Universal Records.

=== Acting career ===
Abaya first appeared on television in the 2008 drama series Ligaw na Bulaklak as Francis, followed by the musical drama anthology Your Song, where he played Rafael "Raffy" Valero. He also became a host of a segment on the variety show It's Showtime, and later hosted Pilipinas Got More Talent, a spin-off program of the reality show Pilipinas Got Talent. In 2010, Abaya starred in horror film Dagim, for which he won "Best Supporting Actor" at the Cinema One Originals Awards.

In 2011, Abaya transferred to GMA Network to guest in the television variety show Party Pilipinas and to appear in the drama romantic comedy series I Heart You, Pare! as Joel. He played Gido in the action horror film Aswang. In 2012, he appeared in television drama series Faithfully, as Kevin Quillamor.

In 2019, he returned to ABS-CBN to appear in drama FPJ's Ang Probinsyano as Jacob Serrano, followed by action drama The Iron Heart in 2022 as Gaspar Kintanar, and drama Roja in 2025 as Lucas "Dos" Sebastian/Bishop Anthony.

In the 2026 ABS-CBN action-drama television series Blood vs Duty as Axl Rosales.

== Discography ==
=== With Sandwich ===
Studio Albums

Year	Title	Label
1999	Grip Stand Throw	Greater East Asia Music & BMG Records (Pilipinas), Inc
2001	4-Track Mind	BMG Records (Pilipinas), Inc
2004	Thanks to the Moon's Gravitational Pull	Play For Serve Records

=== With Kjwan ===
Studio Albums

Year	Title	Label
2004	Kjwan	Sony Music Philippines
2006	2StepMarv	PolyEast Records / Barnyard Music Philippines
2009	13 Seconds to Love	MCA Music Philippines
2012	Kjwan IV Volume One	MCA Music Philippines
2014	Kjwan IV Volume Two	MCA Music Philippines

Other appearances

Year	Song	Label
2003	"Drizzle" (Helltop Remix)	Rx Band Breakout Finalists CD
2005	"A Different Kind"	ROK ON! Music Inspired by the Ragnarok Online Game
2007	"Daliri"	LIVE AND RAW (6UG Live CD)
2009	"Pause"	Kerplunk! DEFIANT
2009	"13 Seconds to Love"	Nokia 5800 Express Music Phone MCA Music
2012	"Kjwan IV Volume 1"	Independent
2014	"Kjwan IV Volume 2"	Independent

== Filmography ==
=== Film ===
Year	Title	Role
2007	Elegie	Seb
2010	Off World	Lucky
2010	Dagim	Pido
2012	Aswang	Gido
2013	Alfredo S. Lim (The Untold Story)	Charlie Zaragosa
2013	Boy Golden: Shoot to Kill	
2014	Sundalong Kanin	
2015	Heneral Luna	young Antonio Luna
2017	Bloody Crayons	Paolo Abrillo

=== Television ===
Year	Title	Role
2008	Ligaw na Bulaklak	Francis
2009	Your Song Presents: Babalik Kang Muli	Rafael "Raffy" Valero
2010	Habang May Buhay	King
2010	Pilipinas Got Talent	Himself
2010	Magkaribal	Neil Olaguer
2011	Party Pilipinas	Himself (performer and co-host)
2011	I Heart You, Pare!	Joel
2011	Spooky Nights Presents: Bampirella	Armand
2011	Daldalita	Sam
2012	Faithfully	Kevin Quillamor
2013	Forever	Federico Gallardo
2013	Magpakailanman: Kriminal na Biktima sa Saudi Arabia	Marlon
2014	Wagas: Love in the Time of War: Monica & Filemon Love Story	Filemon
2014	Ang Dalawang Mrs. Real	Vincent Dumlao
2015	Second Chances	Dustin
2015	Wagas: Ang pag-iibigang Diego at Gabriela Silang	Diego Silang
2015	Princess in the Palace	Raphael Jacinto
2016	Hahamakin ang Lahat	Luisito "Sito" Labsat Sr.
2017	Legally Blind	William Villareal
2017	Impostora	Leo Corpuz
2018	My Guitar Princess	Charlie
2018	The Stepdaughters	Lloyd Almeda
2018	Sherlock Jr.	Carl
2018	Tadhana: Magkasalo	Joel
2018	Cain at Abel	Ramon
2019–2021	FPJ's Ang Probinsyano	Jacob Serrano
2022–2023	The Iron Heart	Gaspar Kintanar (uncredited)
2025–2026	Roja	Lucas "Dos" Esteban
2026	Blood vs Duty	Axl Rosales
