= 2StepMarv =

Studio album by Kjwan
- Released: November 6, 2006
- Studio: Tracks Studio
- Genres: Alternative metal; nu metal; hard rock
- Labels: Barnyard Music Philippines (Independent); EMI Philippines
- Producers: Angee Rozul; Kjwan

Kjwan chronology
Kjwan (2004)	2StepMarv (2006)	13 Seconds to Love (2009)

Singles from 2StepMarv
- 1. "Pintura" Released: November 27, 2006; 2. "Sa Ilalim" Released: February 6, 2007; 3. "One Look" Released: April 15, 2007; 4. "Shai" Released: June 5, 2007

2StepMarv is the second studio album by Filipino rock band Kjwan. It was released through Barnyard Music Philippines in 2006. The album spawned the singles "Pintura", "Sa Ilalim", "One Look", and "Shai".

== Track listing ==
All tracks are written by Kjwan.

No.	Title	Featured Artist	Length
1.	"Invitation"		4:48
2.	"Daan"		3:38
3.	"Can't Do That"	Dan Gil	3:40
4.	"You Didn't Know"		2:53
5.	"2 Step Marv"		5:16
6.	"One Look"	Brigada	3:25
7.	"Pintura"		4:12
8.	"Solana"		3:43
9.	"Shai"		4:57
10.	"Focus"		5:08
11.	"Sa Ilalim"		4:22
12.	"Slow Shutter"		10:31

== Personnel ==
- Marc Abaya – vocals
- Kelley Mangahas – bass
- Jorel Corpus – guitars / percussion / vocals
- J-Hoon Balbuena – drums / vocals
- Boogie Romero – guitars / vocals
