= Bembol Roco =

Filipino actor

- Born: Rafael Aranda Roco, Jr. November 20, 1953 (age 72); Naga, Camarines Sur, Philippines
- Other name: Bembol Roco
- Occupation: Actor
- Years active: 1974–present
- Height: 178 cm (5 ft 10 in)
- Children: 5 (including Felix Roco and Dominic Roco)

Bembol Roco (born Rafael Aranda Roco Jr.; November 20, 1953), is a Filipino actor whose work ranges from films to television. He is best known for his role as Julio Madiaga in the 1975 film Manila in the Claws of Light, which has since gained prominence as one of the greatest Philippine films of all time. He also had an important role in the 1982 Australian-U.S. film The Year of Living Dangerously. He also portrayed villain roles in Filipino action movies due to his signature bald head as well as various supporting roles.

He has twin sons who are also actors named Felix and Dominic.

He is well known for his collaborations with director Lino Brocka, where he is a part of a group of actors called "Brocka babies", and directors such as Ishmael Bernal, Chito S. Roño, Marilou Diaz-Abaya, and Joel Lamangan in the late twentieth century.

== Career ==
Prior to beginning his acting career, Roco underwent an 18-month rehabilitation program at the Drug Abuse Rehabilitation Education (DARE) Foundation in Bicutan. After completing the program, he began working for the organization. In 1974, director Lino Brocka visited the DARE facility to secure a filming permit for his upcoming project. It was during this visit that Brocka met Roco and subsequently cast him in a segment of the anthology film Tatlo, Dalawa, Isa (1974), in which Roco portrayed a recovering drug addict—paralleling his own experience at the time.

Roco later gained widespread recognition when Brocka cast him in the lead role of Julio Madiaga in Maynila: Sa mga Kuko ng Liwanag (1975). The role was originally given to actor Jay Ilagan, and four days of filming had already been completed. However, Brocka felt Ilagan did not physically embody the impoverished and desperate character he envisioned. Roco, then an unknown actor with a lean and weathered appearance, was recast in the role. His performance was critically acclaimed and became one of the defining portrayals in Philippine cinema.

== Personal life ==
Roco is married to former fashion model Coco Artadi, whom he met in a fashion show. Together, they have 5 children, Rafael III, Katrina Isabel, Luis Gabriel, Teodoro Felix, and Ricardo Dominic. They have since separated since 2006.

== Filmography ==
=== Film ===
- Tatlo, Dalawa, Isa (1974) - Rocky
- Manila in the Claws of Light (1975) - Julio Madiaga
- Sakada (1976) - youth activist David
- Tatlong Taong Walang Diyos (1976) - USAFEE fighter Crispin
- Lunes, Martes, Miyerkules, Huwebes, Biyernes, Sabado, Linggo (1976)
- Itim (1976)
- Hubad Na Bayani (1977)
- Tisoy! (1977) - Julio Madiaga
- Babae, Huwag Kang Tukso (1977)
- Sa Piling ng mga Sugapa (1977)
- Banta ng Kahapon (1977)
- Boy Pana (Terror ng Maynila '63) (1978) - Boy Pana
- Pagputi ng Uwak, Pag-itim ng Tagak (1978)
- Lagi Na Lamang Ba Akong Babae? (1978) - Eric
- Hayop sa Hayop (1978)
- Kid Kaliwete (1978) - Kid Kaliwete
- Boy Kodyak (1979) - Detective Teo Rosa
- Isa... Dalawa... Tatlo... Ang Tatay Kong Kalbo (1979)
- Midnight Show (1979)
- Ang Leon, ang Tigre, at ang Alamid (1979)
- Kanto Boy (1980) - Kanto Boy
- Gabi ng Lagim Ngayon (1980) - Abel
- Pinay, American Style (1980) - Nonoy
- Beach House (1980)
- Pangkat Do or Die (1980)
- Alyas Boy Kalbo (1980)
- Taga sa Panahon (1980)
- Intrusion: Cambodia (1981)
- Bulldog (1981)
- Pabling (1981)
- Police Informant: Totoy Guwapo (1981) – Aurelio/Totoy Guwapo
- Asal Hayop (1981)
- Five and the Skin (1982) - Bembol
- Tres Kantos (1982)
- The Year of Living Dangerously (1982) - Kumar
- Over My Dead Body (1983)
- Minsan, May Isang Ina (1983)
- Public Enemy No.1 and the Innocents (1983)-Hugong Bagsik
- 'Merika (1984) - Mon
- Bagets (1984) - Buko vendor
- Halang ang Kaluluwa (1985)
- Pagsabog ng Galit (1986)
- Gabi Na, Kumander (1986)
- Teritoryo Ko Ito (1986)
- Alamat ng Ninja Kuno (1986)
- Top Mission (1987)
- Tatlong Ina, Isang Anak (1987)
- Fight for Us (1989) - Kumander Kontra
- Babangon Ako't Dudurugin Kita (1989) - Rod
- Anak ni Baby Ama (1990) - Junior Bahala (Released Date: September 26, 1990)
- Urbanito Dizon (1990) - Pol
- Biokids (1990)
- Gumapang Ka sa Lusak (1990) - Falcon
- Hindi Kita Iiwanang Buhay: Kapitan Paile (1990) - Sgt. Dalisay (Released Date: November 20, 1990)
- Lover's Delight (1990)
- Kidlat ng Maynila: Joe Pring 2 (1991) - Buwang
- Kalaban Mortal ni Baby Ama (1991)
- Eddie Tagalog: Pulis Makati (1992)
- Kanto Boy: Alyas Kanto Boy (1992) - Morris/Shiny
- Patayin si Billy Zapanta – Order of Battle: Enemy No. 1 (1992) - Patrolman Martin
- Parolado: Partners in Crime (1993) – Enrico Silvano
- Sana'y Ikaw Na Nga (1993)
- Talahib at Rosas (1994) – Kumander Baliling
- Wating (1994) – Bert
- Nagkataon... Nagkatagpo (1994) – Guzman
- Lucas Abelardo (1994) – Mayor
- Pulis Patola 2 (1995)
- Ikaw Pa... Eh Love Kita (1995) – Benjie
- The Grepor Butch Belgica Story (1995) – Enemy in jail
- Asero (1995) – Spade
- Matimbang Pa sa Dugo (1995) - Sabater
- Iligpit si Bobby Ortega: Markang Bungo 2 (1995) - Martin
- Humanda Ka, Babalikan Kita (1996)
- Tubusin Mo ng Bala ang Puso Ko (1996) – Lt. Miranda
- Detective: Michael & Jackson (1996) – Steven Founders
- Wala Nang Iibigin Pang Iba (1997) – Rufo
- Ipaglaban Mo II: The Movie (1997) – Sgt. Macatulos
- Kadre (1997)
- Iskalawag (1997)
- Anak ng Bulkan (1997) – Pulon
- Joe Reyes: Mahirap Patayin, Masamang Buhayin (1997) - Capt. Vicar
- Di Puwedeng Hindi Puwede! (1999) – Mendez
- Esperanza: The Movie (1999) – Luis
- Bulaklak ng Maynila (1999) – Roque
- Palaban (2000) – Barikan
- Biyaheng Langit (2000) – Bossing
- Markova: Comfort Gay (2000) – Puging
- Homecoming (2003) – Mr. Edades
- U Belt (2004) – Major
- Ang Anak ni Brocka (2005)
- Boso (2005) - Tata Nando
- The Great Raid (2005) - Henchman #2
- Tuli (2005)
- Donsol (2006) – Fidel
- First Day High (2006) – Investigator Matriponio
- Faces of Love (2007)
- Ang M.O.N.A.Y. ni Mr. Shooli (Misteyks Opda Neysion Adres Yata) (2007)
- Pi7ong Tagpo (2007) - Fred Rodriguez
- Batanes: Sa Dulo ng Walang Hanggan (2007) – Boy
- Maynila sa mga Pangil ng Dilim (2008)
- U.P.C.A.T. (2008) – Mang Avelino
- Kinuluyang Kiti (2009) – Udong
- Oh, My Girl! (2009) – Director
- Miss You Like Crazy (2010) – Efren Samonte
- Pendong (2010) – Mariano Verona
- Amigo (2011) – Policarpio
- Dagim (2010)
- Forever and a Day (2011)
- Isda (2011)
- Aswang (2011) – Moises, king of the Abuwaks
- Thy Womb (2012) – Bang-Asan
- Tinik (2013)
- Boy Golden: Shoot to Kill (2013) – Frederico delos Reyes
- K'na, the Dreamweaver (2014)
- Tres ("Faith, Love, Time & Dr. Lazaro" segment, 2014) – Dr. Lazaro
- Gangster Lolo (2014)
- Piring (2015)
- Felix Manalo (2015) – Quintín Rivera
- Angela Markado (2015) – Benito
- Pedicab (2016) – Mang Pepe
- What Home Feels Like (2017)
- Baconaua (2017)
- AWOL (2017) – Amang
- Dark Is the Night (2017) – Boss
- Smaller and Smaller Circles (2017)
- Huwag Kang Lalabas ("Bahay" segment; 2021) – Mandurugo
- Nagalit ang Patay sa Haba ng Lamay: Da Resbak (2023)
- Kontrabida (2025)
- The Time That Remains (2025)
- Poon (upcoming)
- Kuya: The Governor Edwin Jubahib Story (upcoming)

=== Television ===
Year	Title	Role	Ref
1995	Maalaala Mo Kaya: Abo	Igme	
1997–1999	Esperanza	Luis Miguel	
1999–2000	Labs Ko Si Babe	Silvestre "Rocky" Escallon	
2001–2003	Recuerdo de Amor	Ward	
2002–2003	Ang Iibigin ay Ikaw	Oscar	
2006	Maalaala Mo Kaya: Palaisdaan	Gusting	
2006	Sa Piling Mo	Al Fernandez	
2006	Komiks Presents: Da Adventures of Pedro Penduko	Kadyo	
2006	Maalaala Mo Kaya: Korte	Ernie	
2006–2007	Maging Sino Ka Man	Tomas Arroyo	
2007	Asian Treasures	Marcus Vergara	
2007	Maalaala Mo Kaya: Rosaryo	Alberto Bautista	
2007	Pangarap na Bituin	Alex Rodriguez	
2007–2008	Maging Sino Ka Man: Ang Pagbabalik	Tomas Arroyo	
2008	Iisa Pa Lamang	Martin Dela Rhea	
2008	Komiks Presents: Kapitan Boom	Hector Dasmaquinoz	
2008	Maalaala Mo Kaya: Singsing	Jun	
2009–2010	Sine Novela: Tinik Sa Dibdib	Tiburcio "Tibo" Yadao	
2009	Maalaala Mo Kaya: Medal Of Valor	Domeng Rubi	
2010–2011	Beauty Queen	Angelo "Anya" Castillo	
2011	Sisid	Don Segismundo Zaragoza	
2011	Sa Ngalan ng Ina	Armando "Amang" Deogracias	
2011–2012	Ikaw ay Pag-Ibig	Robert Jimenez	
2012	Maalaala Mo Kaya: Gayuma	Vic	
2012	Maalaala Mo Kaya: Motorsiklo	Danilo	
2012	One True Love	Henry Sandoval	
2012	Maalaala Mo Kaya: Komiks	Gilbert	
2013	May Isang Pangarap	Turing	
2013	Bayan Ko	Ernesto Santiago	
2013	Pyra: Babaeng Apoy	Cesar Ortiz	
2013	Muling Buksan ang Puso	Ernie Cabigas	
2013	Maalaala Mo Kaya: Dream House	Paeng	
2014	Mars Ravelo's Dyesebel	Fabian Reyes	
2014	Maalaala Mo Kaya: Kwintas	Bert	
2014	Sana Bukas pa ang Kahapon	Fidel De Guzman	
2014	Maalaala Mo Kaya: Nurse Cap	Mr. Palma	
2015	Karelasyon	Warren	
2015–2016	Little Nanay	Berto Batongbuhay	
2016	Once Again	Romulo Del Mundo	
2016	FPJ's Ang Probinsyano	PC/Supt. Redentor Almario	
2018	Pepito Manaloto	Benny Manaloto	
2018	The One That Got Away	Pancho Makalintal	
2019	Kara Mia	Sio	
2019	The Gift	Crispin Anzures	
2022	Lolong	Narsing Candelaria	
2023	Big Bet	Daniel	
2023	Walang Matigas na Pulis sa Matinik na Misis	Ulo	
2024	Lilet Matias: Attorney-at-Law	Mang Ķanor	
2025	Incognito	Rolando "Ninong" Reyes	
2025	Maalaala Mo Kaya	Luis Catacutan	

== Awards ==
Year	Category	Work	Award giving body
1976	Best Actor	Maynila Sa Mga Kuko Ng Liwanag	FAMAS award
-	Best Actor	Sa Piling Ng Mga Sugapa	Urian award
-	Best Actor	Esperanza	Star Awards
2016	Best Actor	Pauwi Na	ToFarm Awards
2017	Best Actor	Pauwi Na	Luna Awards
2017	Best Actor	What Home Feels Like	ToFarm Awards
