= 13 Seconds to Love =

Studio album by Kjwan
- Released: May 14, 2009
- Studio: Kerplunk! Studios; Circus Studios
- Genre: Pinoy rock; alternative rock; alternative metal; post-grunge; hard rock
- Length: 47:38
- Label: MCA Music Philippines
- Producer: Pat Jalbuena; Kjwan

Kjwan chronology
2StepMarv (2006)	13 Seconds to Love (2009)

Singles from 13 Seconds to Love
- 1. "Lifeline" Released: March 30, 2009; 2. "Pause" Released: October 27, 2009; 3. "Meron Ba" Released: June 29, 2010

13 Seconds to Love is the third studio album by Filipino rock band, Kjwan. It was first launched on digital format on 6 February 2009 at A. Venue Mall (Makati), preloaded on Nokia 5800 XpressMusic cellphones. Although the album was released around 21 July 2009 through MCA Music Philippines, it was only until exactly a month later that the CD was officially launched at Saguijo (Makati).

== Album information ==
A Malaysian DJ/producer once told Kjwan that he can tell whether a song will be a hit within the first thirteen seconds. It stuck with the band and brought this along with their song writing with love as the common theme.

Kjwan focused mainly on the album's songwriting and put flashy guitar solos, drum fills, and complicated odd-time bits on the backseat resulting to a different sound from the band's two previous albums. 13 Seconds to Love also marks Jorel's break with the band to pursue his studies at Berklee College of Music.

== Track listing ==
All tracks are written by Kjwan

No.	Title	Length
1.	"13 Seconds to Love"	4:05
2.	"What About Us"	3:53
3.	"Pause"	5:38
4.	"Meron Ba"	4:24
5.	"Lifeline"	6:12
6.	"Sunny Weather"	3:07
7.	"Dance on the Floor"	4:08
8.	"Drowning"	3:29
9.	"Complicated"	3:30
10.	"Nasilayan"	4:13
11.	"One Life"	4:59

== Personnel ==
- Marc Abaya – vocals / guitar
- Kelley Mangahas – bass
- Boogie Romero – guitar / vocals
- Jorel Corpus – guitar / percussion
- J-Hoon Balbuena – drum / vocals

=== Credits ===
- "13 Seconds to Love", "What About Us", "Pause", "Meron Ba", "Lifeline", "Sunny Weather", "Dance on the Floor", and "One Life" was recorded at Kerplunk! Studios by Pat Jalbuena
- "Complicated", "Drowning", and "Nasilayan" was recorded at Circus Studios by Niño Avenido.
- Additional Production by Niño Avenido
- Mixed and Mastered in Kerplunk! Studios by Pat Jalbuena
- Keys in "Pause" by Dan Gil and Inky De Dios
- Keys in "Dance on the Floor" by Inky De Dios
- Sax and Flute on "Dance on the Floor" by Alvin Cornista
- String Arrangement on "Meron Ba" by Rico Ledesma
- Shaker on "Sunny Weather" by Luis Rodriguez
- Additional Vocals on "13 Seconds to Love" by the Kjwan Kids
- Cover artwork by Rom Villaseran
- Technical layout by Kelvin Uy
- Band photo by Jose Quintas-Primero
