= Five on the Floor =

Studio album by Sandwich
- Released: February 24, 2006
- Recorded: 2005–2006
- Studios: Sound Creation Studio, Quezon City, Metro Manila
- Genres: Alternative rock; punk rock; rap rock
- Length: 45:51
- Label: EMI Philippines
- Producer: Buddy Zabala

Sandwich chronology
Thanks To The Moon's Gravitational Pull (2003)	Five on the Floor (2006)	<S> Marks The Spot (2008)

Singles from Five on the Floor
- 1. "Sugod" Released: January 29, 2006; 2. "Walang Kadala-dala" Released: June 22, 2006; 3. "DVD X" Released: November 17, 2006; 4. "Sunburn" Released: April 25, 2007

Five on the Floor is the fourth studio album by Filipino alternative rock band Sandwich released in February 24, 2006. The album contains the singles "Sugod" (which was inspired by Juan Dela Cruz Band's Kahit Anong Mangyari), "Sunburn", "DVDX" and "Walang Kadala-Dala". This is the first album without Marc Abaya as lead vocalist of the band and the first featuring Mong Alcaraz as guitarist. The title of the album is a pun on the "four on the floor" disco beat.

== Track listing ==
No.	Title	Length
1.	"Sugod"	3:01
2.	"Sunburn"	2:48
3.	"DVDX"	3:15
4.	"Photocopy"	3:39
5.	"View Master"	3:42
6.	"Walang Kadala Dala"	4:21
7.	"In Case Of Fire"	6:15
8.	"Resbak"	4:04
9.	"Goodnight January"	3:07
10.	"Kalendaryo"	4:50
11.	"Marikina"	2:53
12.	"Let Your Cellphone Shine"	4:04

== Personnel ==
- Mike Dizon: Drums, Vocals, videocam
- Myrene Academia: Bass, Vocals, Ps2
- Diego Castillo: Guitars, Vocals, toys, allen pillows
- Mong Alcaraz: Guitars, Vocals, iPod Video
- Raimund Marasigan: Vocals, Guitars, Synths, Percs, Melodica

== Album credits ==
- Recorded & Mixed by: Shinji Tanaka
- Mastered by: Zach Lucero @ tweak
- Album Packaging Design by: Inksurge.com
- Keyboards, percs & additional tracks recorded at: the squid crib
- Additional background Vocals: Francis Reyes, Nina, buds & Jasonic
