= Kjwan (album) =

Studio album by Kjwan
- Released: August 14, 2004
- Studio: Tracks Studio
- Genre: Pinoy rock; alternative metal; nu metal; hard rock
- Length: 50:33
- Label: Sony Music Philippines
- Producer: Kjwan; Angee Rozul

Kjwan chronology
Kjwan (2004)	2StepMarv (2006)

Singles from Kjwan
- 1. "Boomerang" Released: August 7, 2003; 2. "Daliri" Released: September 27, 2004; 3. "Surface" Released: January 9, 2005; 4. "Twilight" Released: April 24, 2005

Kjwan is the debut studio album by Filipino rock band Kjwan. It was released through Sony Music Philippines in August 14, 2004. The album contained their singles "Daliri" and "Twilight".

== Track listing ==
No.	Title	Length
1.	"Surface"	2:10
2.	"Boomerang"	3:17
3.	"Someday"	3:55
4.	"Slip"	4:34
5.	"Backbone"	3:14
6.	"Set It"	4:37
7.	"Moving"	4:10
8.	"Daliri"	4:43
9.	"Twilight"	4:25
10.	"Bracelet"	4:33
11.	"Drizzle"	5:18
12.	"My Dear"	5:37

== Personnel ==
- Marc Abaya – vocals
- Kelley Mangahas – bass
- Jorel Corpus – guitars, percussion, vocals
- J-Hoon Balbuena – drums, vocals

== Accolades ==
Year	Award-giving body	Category	Nominated work	Result
2005	Nu 107.5 2004 Year End Countdown	Top 20 OPM Songs on the 2004 NU107 Countdown	"Daliri"	3rd
2005	Nu 107.5 2004 Year End Countdown	Top 107 Songs for 2004 (ranked from #107 to #1)	"Daliri"	25th
