= S Marks the Spot =

<S> Marks the Spot

Studio album by Sandwich
- Released: February 12, 2008
- Recorded: 2007–2008
- Studio: Sound Creation Studio, Quezon City, Metro Manila
- Genre: Alternative rock; punk rock; rap rock
- Length: 1:46:40
- Label: EMI Philippines
- Producer: Buddy Zabala; Chris Sy

Sandwich chronology
Five on the Floor (2006)	<S> Marks the Spot (2008)	Contra Tiempo (2010)

Singles from <S> Marks the Spot
- 1. "Procrastinator" Released: January 28, 2008; 2. "Betamax" Released: May 7, 2008; 3. "Selos" Released: December 1, 2008; 4. "Manila" Released: January 20, 2009

<S> Marks the Spot is the fifth studio album by Filipino alternative rock band Sandwich released in 2008. The album marks the 10th anniversary of the band. It contains the singles "Procrastinator", "Betamax" and "Selos". The album was launched on February 12, 2008, at the UP Sunken Garden where Sandwich performed their first gig in 1998.

The second disc of the album also features 9 of their past songs remixed and remade. It also contains the songs "Zaido", the theme song of the television series of the same name, "Super Noypi", the theme song of the movie of the same name, "Humanda Ka", the theme song of Rounin and "Nginig".

== Track listing ==
All music written and composed by Raimund Marasigan.

=== Disc one ===
1. "Procrastinator" - 3:53
2. "Ang Pagbabalik - 3:40
3. "Greenpick" - 0:31
4. "Betamax" - 4:08
5. "Line Drawings" - 3:18
6. "Manila" - 3:49
7. "Partner in Crime" - 3:00
8. "Two Lovers" - 3:10
9. "Text in the City" - 5:26
10. "Her Favorite Band" - 4:07
11. "Selos" - 3:57
12. "Youth and Vitality" - 0:20
13. "Rambol" - 3:53
14. "Primera" - 3:01
15. "Fluxxe" - 3:38
16. "Candelaria" - 3:49
17. "Public Offender" - 4:31

=== Disc two ===
1. "Zaido" - 3:17
2. "Super Noypi" - 4:01
3. "Sugod" (Acoustic) - 3:01
4. "Sunburn" (Chilitees Remix) - 4:06
5. "Walang Kadala Dala" (Remix) - 4:06
6. "DVDX Maps" - 3:10
7. "DVDX Mike" - 3:13
8. "DVDX Wow Akshun" - 3:16
9. "DVDX Mong" - 3:17
10. "Nginig" - 4:24
11. "View Mistress" (Remix) - 6:04
12. "Humanda Ka" - 3:08
13. "Two Trick Pony" (Acoustic) - 3:44
