= 6underground =

Music venue in the Philippines

Coordinates: 14.5805°N 121.060425°E

6UNDERGROUND Live & Raw (also known as 6UG) is a music venue in the Philippines established in 2004. Since 2006, the bar is located in the Ortigas Center on the premises of a rock bar called Kalye, which was active in the 1990s.

== Cultural significance ==
6UG allows for appearance of mostly unknown bands.

6UG was where Rivermaya made their live television special, "Live @ 6Underground", aired over Studio 23; one of the uncommon times that the old quartet with Rico Blanco performed their set in a relatively small venue. It was also one of the few bars where Bamboo (band), a rival of Rivermaya, performed. When foreign acts such as Love Me Butch and Interlace came to Manila, their very first stops were also at 6underground. Conclusively, the film of The Dawn (band), "Tulad Ng Dati" as well as their video "Ang Iyong Paalam", were shot at the bar.

During its Makati tenure, 6UG was also the venue of events by Pulp magazine NU 107, 99.5 RT, Monster Radio RX 93.1 radio stations, MTV Philippines, a bunch of get-togethers from schools Ateneo de Manila University, DLSU, Assumption College (Philippines), University of the Philippines, and many other groups. Even the first Philippine Idol TV series celebration was held there, among others.

6UG also played host to several sanctioned fights. Local mixed martial arts club URCC held one of the club's first organized fights there. 6underground was the site for many photo shoots involving models, singers an actresses.

== The albums ==
It is the only music venue in the Philippines that released two compilation albums. The Gathering album was released in 2006 produced by 6UG co-owner Bel Sayson under 6Underground Records and Ballyhoo. It was an independently produced collection of bands that regularly played at the bar. They were The Amandas, Kiko Machine, Pinas, Lahi, Southern Grass, Sugarhiccup, Shoulder State, Dream Kitchen, Prank Sinatra, to name a few.

The second album entitled Live & Raw was released in 2007. It is a collection of live and unedited performances captured at 6UG. The artists included therein are considered as some of the well-known personalities in Pinoy rock: Pepe Smith, The Dawn (band), Rivermaya, Kjwan, Project Mayhem Md, Kapatid (band), Skychurch, among others. This was likewise produced by Bel Sayson under 6Underground Records and distributed nationwide by Warner Music Philippines.

== The bands ==
More than 600 artists have performed at 6UG. Among them were 6 Cycle Mind, 18th Issue, Angulo, Badburn, Callalily, Chicosci, Cynthia Alexander, Champagne, Daydream Cycle, Death by Stereo, Dicta License, Enemies Of Saturn, Erektus, Faspitch, Furlong, Francis M, Greyhoundz, Hale, Imago, Itchyworms, Join d Club, Juana, Julianne, Jun Lopito, Kala, Kapatid, Kiko Machine, Kjwan, Lokomotiv, Mayonnaise, Menaya, A Music Theory, Narda, Paramita, Parokya Ni Edgar, Project Mayhem Md, Pedicab, Pepe Smith, Pupil, Queso, Radioactive Sago Project, Razorback, Rocksteddy, Sandwich, Session Road, Sinosikat?, Slapshock, Sponge Cola, Stonefree, Sugarhiccup, Black Manika, Kadja Odja, Tropical Depression, Tuesday Vargas, Typecast, Up Dharma Down, Goodbye Tracy Urbandub, Vinyard, Wickermoss, and many others.

== Media ==
6underground was featured in various Philippine print media like Pulp, Burn, Fudge, Mabuhay, FHM, Uno, Anthem, Loud, Circuit, Philippine Star, and Manila Bulletin. Many of its past events were covered by both MTV Philippines and the Myx channels.

In 2008, 6UG launched the "Live & Raw" television show on Studio 23 every Sundays at 10:45PM. It is a collection of live performances as recorded at 6Underground. This is the first time that a Philippine rock venue has gone national TV. Simultaneously, 6UG also partnered with the Home of NU Rock, NU 107, for a similar-format FM radio show every Tuesdays at 10:00PM with hosts Pulp's Joey Dizon and Bel Sayson. To complete the media, they also feature other band performances and live video streaming through their website, underground.ph , making 6Underground an independent multimedia community.
