= Sandwich (band) =

Filipino rock band

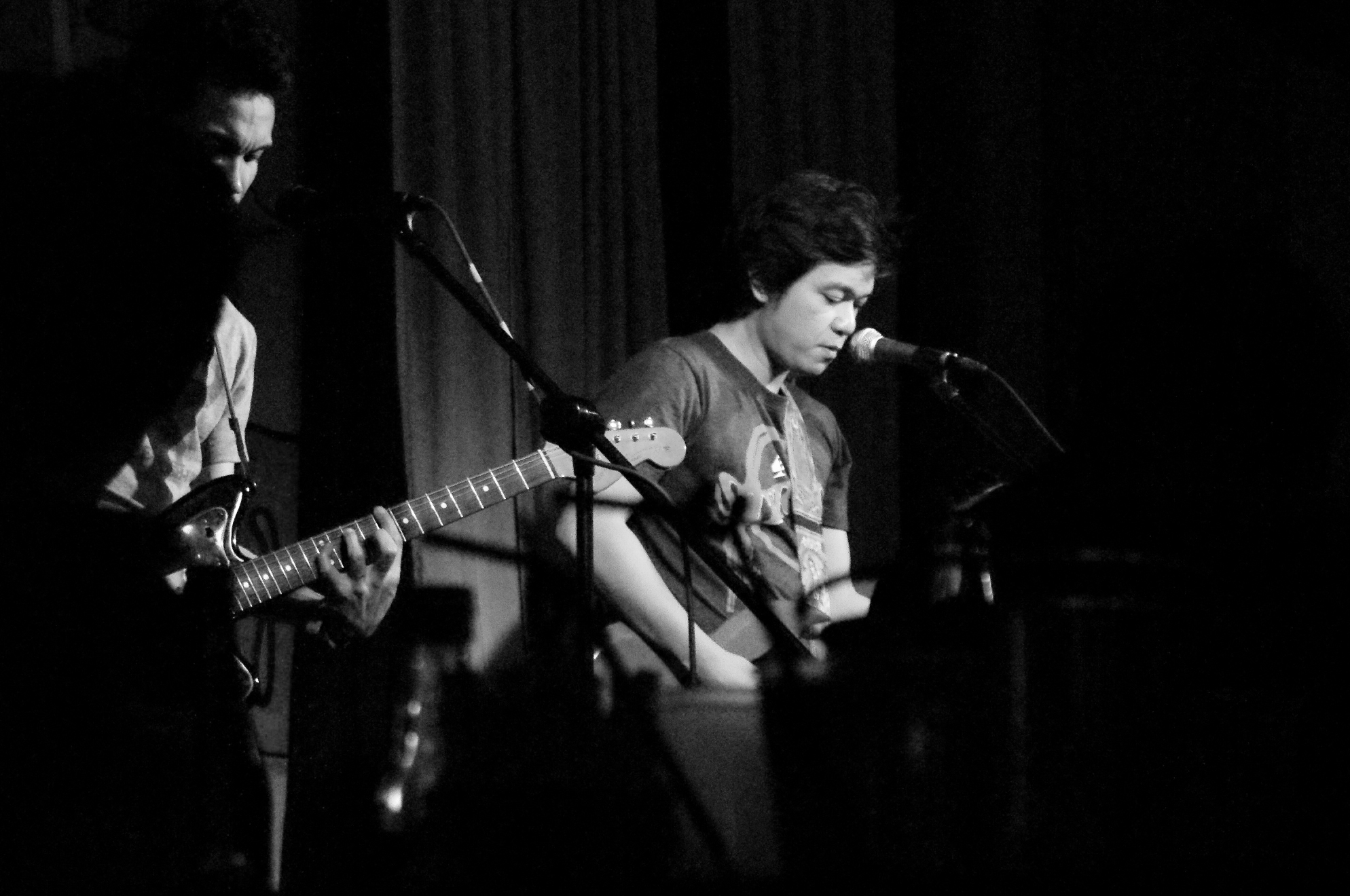
- Sandwich, 2013: Diego Castillo and Raymund Marasigan

Background information
- Origin: Parañaque, Metro Manila, Philippines
- Genres: Pinoy rock; alternative rock; punk rock; post-punk; hard rock; rap rock; nu metal (early); post-grunge (early)
- Years active: 1998–present
- Labels: Sony Music; PolyEast; Soupstar
- Members: Raymund Marasigan; Diego Castillo; Myrene Academia; Mong Alcaraz; Mike Dizon
- Past members: Marc Abaya

Sandwich (stylized <S>andwich in earlier releases) is a Filipino alternative rock band from the Philippines that was formed by Raymund Marasigan and Diego Castillo. The band currently consists of lead vocalist Raymund Marasigan, guitarists and backing vocalists Diego Castillo and Mong Alcaraz, bassist Myrene Academia, and drummer Mike Dizon.

== History ==
=== Formation and Grip Stand Throw (1998–2000) ===
Sandwich was formed in 1998 by Raymund Marasigan (drummer of Eraserheads) and Diego Castillo (The Aga Muhlach Experience) for the purpose of fulfilling their mutual desire to work together. When Raymund Marasigan saw The Aga Muhlach Experience at a gig, he told Diego that he wanted to form a band that sounds like Weezer and Whales. He then recruited Diego Castillo and his bandmates from The Aga Muhlach Experience: drummer Mike Dizon (also from Teeth) and bassist Myrene Academia (also from Imago). Their first jam was at Dizon's house in Parañaque. Sandwich was searching for a vocalist when music video director Marie Jamora recommended her friend Marc Abaya. A few years earlier, Marasigan was a judge at a contest featuring Marc Abaya with his high-school band, Shirley Beans. Abaya then joined Sandwich. When Abaya and Marasigan met each other, they jammed together, performing Beastie Boys "Sabotage" for ten minutes.

Although existing simultaneously with Marasigan's band, Eraserheads, at that time, Sandwich provided a heavier, grittier sound, and built up their own fan base. Abaya was still in college at the time, and Marasigan would still tour occasionally with Eraserheads, but these weren't hindering factors for Sandwich, as there were many session musicians ready to take over in case of a member's absence.

In 1999, they signed with Sony Music and released their debut album, Grip Stand Throw, with much success thanks to its carrier single, "Butterfly Carnival." The band won three awards at the 1999 NU 107 Rock Awards: Album of the Year, Best New Artist, and Song of the Year.

=== 4-Track Mind (2000–2003) ===
The following year, Sandwich released their second album, 4-Track Mind, on July 30, 2001, which was not as commercially successful as their debut album. However, it was honored as Album of the Year at the 2001 NU Rock Awards. The album name came from Marc Abaya's 4-track recorder, which he brought into the studio containing a demo. Marc Abaya considers this as his most personal album.

=== Thanks to the Moon's Gravitational Pull and Marc Abaya's departure (2003–2005) ===
The year 2003 marked a critical time for Sandwich. That year, recording label Sony Music decided to drop the band. The following year, 2004, Sandwich took the independent route and recorded their third album, Thanks to the Moon's Gravitational Pull. Eventually, they signed with PolyEast Records. The album's hit tracks were "Two Trick Pony," "Masilungan," and "Nahuhulog."

While in Sandwich, Marc Abaya formed the band Kjwan with his longtime friends and former high-school bandmates and fellow Ateneans Kelley Mangahas, Jorel Corpus, and J-hoon Balbuena.

Later in 2013, Abaya would reveal in an interview with Radio Republic that Marasigan once told him that Shirley Beans must reform. Abaya interpreted this as Marasigan telling him that some of his material didn't fit Sandwich. At the time of the supposed conversation between Marasigan and Abaya, the latter was having difficulty managing his job as an MTV VJ and his obligations to his other band, Kjwan.

On February 20, 2005, Abaya left Sandwich, citing "loaded work" as his reason. In an interview with Radio Republic, Abaya said that he regrets leaving Sandwich without giving a proper farewell to the band. They remain good friends and reunite to play a few songs from time to time.

=== Five on the Floor and mainstream success (2006–2008) ===
After Abaya's departure, Raymund Marasigan assumed main vocal duties. They remained a 5-piece band by bringing in guitarist Mong Alcaraz from Chicosci. The band wrote songs for soundtracks, including "Humanda Ka" for the online game Tantra, and "Nginig" for the ABS-CBN television program of the same name.

In early 2006, Sandwich released their fourth album, Five on the Floor. This was their first album with Marasigan as the sole front man. In late October 2006, their songs "Sugod" and "DVDX" became available on the online music game O2Jam. The video for "Sugod" won five major awards at the 2006 MTV Pilipinas Music Awards, including Video of the Year, Best Director, and Best Editing. In the same year, Sandwich members Mong Alcaraz and Myrene Acamedia won the Best Guitarist and Best Bassist awards, respectively, at the NU Rock Awards. The following year, "DVDX" won the Best Music Video award from the same awards show. Their former vocalist Marc Abaya expressed appreciation for the album (Five on the Floor). He stated that "he cried because of happiness for his former band" and said that the sound of the fifth album is what Sandwich's sound was meant to be.

In 2007, Sandwich performed "Zaido," the theme song for the fantaserye action series Zaido: Pulis Pangkalawakan, which aired on GMA 7. The song was written by Raymund Marasigan.

=== S Marks the Spot and continuous success (2009–2010) ===
In 2008, their fifth album, <S> Marks the Spot, was released. The album received recognition from various awards shows, thanks to its hit singles "Procrastinator" and "Betamax." In celebration of their tenth year in the industry, Sandwich briefly reunited with former vocalist Marc Abaya for a series of anniversary shows.

This year also started a 4-year relationship with Tanduay. Sandwich became part of Tanduay's First Five, which was five of the most popular bands in the country on a nationwide tour playing their hits.

=== Contra Tiempo, Fat Salt & Flame, Debris, Under the Glow of the Satellite concert (2010–2020) ===
In 2010, Sandwich launched their sixth studio album, Contra Tiempo, featuring the single "Putik," which the band dedicated to the victims of Typhoon Ondoy (international name Ketsana). "Lakad" was released as the second single from the album.

2012 was the year when the band had a chance to travel and share their music with different countries. They participated in the Hong Kong Clockenflap Music and Arts Festival, Malaysia's Future Music Festival, and the Hollywood Bowl with Apl.de.ap (Allan Pineda Lindo) of the Black Eyed Peas in Los Angeles, California, USA.

In April 2013, they released the album, Fat, Salt, & Flame, under Polyeast Records. A year after the release of Fat, Salt, & Flame, they released their eight album, Debris, with the carrier single "Kagulo." It was released on February 12, 2015, through PolyEast Records. It was launched on February 25, 2015, at the U.P. Town Center in Quezon City, Philippines. The album design of Debris featured destroyed and disassembled audio electronics, like a Fostex cassette track that was first used as album cover for 4-Track Mind and a Tascam minidisc track used for the production of Sandwich's Grip, Stand Throw, Squid9's Ink Jet, and Eraserheads' Natin99 and Carbonstereoxide. In 2014, Sandwich headlined P-Fest UK, performing in Leeds and London, United Kingdom, together with other Filipino bands Top Junk, Squid 9, The Diegos, Pedicab, and Yano, as well as with UK-based Filipino bands. In 2017, they took part in the Coke Studio Philippines Project, collaborating with young electronic artist BP Valenzuela.

In 2018, Sandwich celebrated their twentieth year by releasing a new single called "Time Lapse." It was released on February 1, 2018. They held their anniversary show on April 13, 2018, at the Metrotent Convention Center in Pasig.

=== No Goodbyes EP and Kaswal EP (2020–present) ===
On May 20, 2022, the band released their first EP, No Goodbyes, a 5-track list featuring their lead single of the same title and "Buhol Buhol" (both were released in 2020 before the COVID-19 pandemic). Production of these songs were recorded at a private place in Batangas for 3 days, although other recordings were done at both their residences and at Kodama Studios as well as the help from Buddy Zabala for Marasigan's vocals in pre-production.

On March 26, 2025, the band released their second EP, Kaswal, a 6-track list featuring a series of singles displaying their versatility: "Nyare," "Ibang Araw Na Lang," "Morena," and "Wag Ka Na Lang Kumagat."

== Influences ==
Sandwich's cited influences are Foo Fighters, Weezer, Sonic Youth, Superchunk, Beck, Beastie Boys, Whale, The Cure, Led Zeppelin, The Doors, Nine Inch Nails, Korn, Red Hot Chili Peppers, Pantera, Deftones, and LCD Soundsystem. The band's main influences are Weezer and Whale. During a performance at 19 East in Sucat, Muntinlupa City, Philippines, Marasigan mentioned that they want to be awesome like Foo Fighters, indie like Sonic Youth, and hip-hop like Beastie Boys. When Abaya was the vocalist of the band, he mentioned in the interview that his main influences were Led Zeppelin and Jim Morrison of The Doors. Myrene Academia and Mong Alcaraz also mentioned their admiration for LCD Soundsystem.

== Band members ==
Current members

- Raymund Marasigan – lead vocals, keyboards, rhythm guitar, percussion (1998–present)
- Diego Castillo – rhythm and lead guitar, backing vocals (1998–present)
- Myrene Academia – bass guitar, aerophones, occasional backing vocals (1998–present)
- Mong Alcaraz – lead guitar, backing vocals, keyboards (2005–present)
- Mike Dizon – drums, percussion (1998–present)

Former member

- Marc Abaya – co-lead and backing vocals, lead guitar (1998–2005)

Session members

- Enzo Hermosa – drums
- Eco Del Rio – bass

== Discography ==
=== Studio albums ===
- Grip Stand Throw (1999)
- 4-Track Mind (2001)
- Thanks to the Moon's Gravitational Pull (2004)
- Five on the Floor (2006)
- <S> Marks the Spot (2008)
- Contra Tiempo (2010)
- Fat Salt & Flame (2013)
- Debris (2015)

=== Extended plays ===
- No Goodbyes (2022)
- Kaswal (2025)

=== Soundtracks ===
- Tantra Neo Oriental Fantasy (2005)
  - Humanda Ka Music Video
  - Humanda Ka OST
  - Humanda Ka (Minus One)
- Rounin OST (2007)
  - "Humanda Ka"
- Ngining OST
  - "Nginig"
- Super Noypi OST
  - "Super Noypi"
- Mga Awit Kapuso: The Best Of GMA Themes Vol. 4 (2008)
  - Zaido: Pulis Pangkalawakan OST
    - "Zaido"

=== Commercial jingles ===
- Smart Bro jingle
  - Modified version of Sugod for Smart Communications' wireless internet service
- Coca-Cola Philippines commercial jingle
  - Buhay Coke (2008) and Open Coca-Cola, Open Happiness (2009)
- Chiz Escudero's campaign jingle
  - Modified version of Sugod
- Frenzy Condoms
  - Are We Good
- Cafe Puro
  - Modified version of Betamax

=== Compilations ===
- The 2 in 1 Series: Sandwich

=== Collaborations ===
- Full Volume (2004)
  - "Right Now (Morse Immediate Mix)"
- Pinoy Ako(2005)
  - "Humanda Ka"
- Kami nAPO Muna (2006)
  - "Bakit Ang Babae"
- CloseUp Season of Smiles Christmas Album (2006)
  - "Close Encounter"
- Sakto Sa Pasko Christmas Album (2008)
  - "Simbang Gabi"
- I-Star 15: The Best Of Alternative & Rock Songs (2010)
  - "Humanda Ka"

=== Singles ===
- "Butterfly Carnival" (1999)
- "Food for the Soul" (2001)
- "Right Now" (2003)
- "Two Trick Pony" (2003)
- "Nahuhulog" (2003)
- "Masilungan" (2004)
- "Humanda Ka" (2005)
- "Sugod" (2006)
- "Walang Kadala-dala" (2006)
- "DVDX" (2006)
- "Super Noypi" (2006)
- "Sunburn" (2007)
- "Zaido (2008)
- "Procrastinator" (2008)
- "Betamax" (2008)
- "Selos" (2008)
- "Manila" (2009)
- "Putik" (2010)
- "Lakad" (2011)
- "Pera Pera" (2011)
- "Back for More" (2013)
- "New Romancer" (2013)
- "Mayday" (2014)
- "Kagulo" (2015)
- “Buhangin” (2015)
- “Outlaw” (2016)
- “Stutter” (with BP Valenzuela) (2017)
- “O Holy Night” (with BP Valenzuela) (2017)
- “Even If You Asked Me” (2017)
- "Time Lapse" (2018)
- “Parang Walang Nangyari” (2018)
- “Koloring Book” (with Ice Seguerra) (2019)
- “Buhol Buhol” (2020)
- “Curtains” (2022)
- “Negatives” (2022)
- “You Don’t Know What You Have” (2022)
- “Nyare?” (2023)
- “Ibang Araw Na Lang” (2023)
- “Morena” (2024)
- “Wag Ka Na Lang Kumagat” (2025)
- “Basura” (with SUYEN) (2025)

== Awards and nominations ==
Year	Award giving body	Category	Nominated work	Results
1999	NU Rock Awards	Best New Artist	—N/a	Won
1999	NU Rock Awards	Song of the Year	"Butterfly Carnival"	Won
1999	NU Rock Awards	Album of the Year(shared with Wolgang)	"Grip Stand Throw"	Won
2000	Awit Awards	Best Performance of a New Duo or Group Recording Artist	"Butterfly Carnival"	Won
2001	NU Rock Awards	Album of the Year	"4-Track Mind"	Won
2001	NU Rock Awards	Artist of the Year	—N/a	Nominated
2001	NU Rock Awards	Song Of the Year	"Food for the Soul"	Nominated
2001	NU Rock Awards	Best Music Video	"Food for the Soul"	Nominated
2001	NU Rock Awards	Best Album Packaging	"4-Track Mind"	Nominated
2001	NU Rock Awards	Vocalist of the Year	(for Marc Abaya)	Nominated
2001	NU Rock Awards	Guitarist of the Year	(for Marc Abaya & Diego Castillo)	Nominated
2001	NU Rock Awards	Drummer of the Year	(for Mike Dizon)	Nominated
2004	NU Rock Awards	Producer of the Year	"Thanks to the Moon's Gravitational Pull"	Won
2005	NU Rock Awards	Song of the Year	"Humanda Ka"	Nominated
2005	NU Rock Awards	Best Male Award	(for Raymund Marasigan)	Nominated
2005	NU Rock Awards	Best Female Award	(for Myrene Academia)	Nominated
2006	MTV Pilipinas Music Awards	Best Production Design in a Video	"Sugod"	Won
2006	MTV Pilipinas Music Awards	Best Editing in a Video	"Sugod"	Won
2006	MTV Pilipinas Music Awards	Video of the Year	"Sugod"	Won
2006	MYX Music Awards	Favorite Indie Artist	—N/a	Won
2006	NU Rock Awards	Best Music Video of the Year	"Sugod"	Won
2006	NU Rock Awards	Best Album Packaging	(Inksurge.com for "Five on the Floor")	Won
2006	NU Rock Awards	Guitarist of the Year	(for Mong Alcaraz)	Won
2006	NU Rock Awards	Bassist of the Year	(for Myrene Academia)	Won
2006	NU Rock Awards	Best Male Award	(for Mong Alcaraz)	Won
2006	NU Rock Awards	Vocalist of the Year	(for Raymund Marasigan)	Nominated
2006	NU Rock Awards	Best Live Act	—N/a	Nominated
2006	NU Rock Awards	Song of the Year	"Sugod"	Nominated
2006	NU Rock Awards	Artist/ Band of the Year	—N/a	Nominated
2006	NU Rock Awards	Album of the Year	"Five on the Floor"	Nominated
2006	NU Rock Awards	Producer of the Year	(Buddy Zabala for "Five on the Floor")	Nominated
2007	MYX Music Awards	Favorite Music Video	"Sugod"	Nominated
2007	MYX Music Awards	Favorite Song	"Sugod"	Nominated
2007	MYX Music Awards	Favorite Artist	—N/a	Nominated
2007	MYX Music Awards	Favorite Rock Video	"Sugod"	Nominated
2007	MYX Music Awards	Favorite Group	—N/a	Nominated
2007	MYX Music Awards	Favorite Media Soundtrack	"Super Noypi"	Nominated
2007	NU Rock Awards	Best Music Video	"DVDX"	Won
2007	NU Rock Awards	Song of the Year	"DVDX"	Nominated
2008	NU Rock Awards	Best Live Act	—N/a	Won
2008	NU Rock Awards	Song of the Year	"Betamax"	Won
2008	NU Rock Awards	Best Album Packaging	(Inksurge.com for "<S> Marks the Spot")	Won
2008	NU Rock Awards	Bassist of the Year	(for Myrene Academia)	Nominated
2008	NU Rock Awards	Drummer of the Year	(for Mike Dizon)	Nominated
2008	NU Rock Awards	Artist of the Year	—N/a	Nominated
2008	NU Rock Awards	Album of the Year	"<S> Marks the Spot"	Nominated
2011	MYX Music Awards	Favorite Artist	—N/a	Won
2011	MYX Music Awards	Favorite Rock Video	"Lakad"	Won

Awards
Preceded by Orphan Lily	NU Rock Awards; Best New Artist; 1999	Succeeded by Slapshock
Preceded by The Jerks; The Jerks	NU Rock Awards; Album of the Year; Grip Stand Throw together with Serve In Silence; 1999	Succeeded by Free; Rivermaya
Preceded by Free; Rivermaya	NU Rock Awards; Album of the Year; 4-Track Mind; 2001	Succeeded by Pilipinas; Cheese
