= 2023 in Philippine music =

The following is a list of events and releases related to Philippine music that have happened or are expected to happen in the year 2023.

== Notable events ==
- February 12 – Seven contestants, including singer-actor Marcus Cabais, win the survival competition Dream Maker.
- March 4 – Althea Ruedas of Antipolo, Rizal, wins the "Little Miss Diva" segment on Eat Bulaga!.
- May 6 – Lyka Estrella of General Santos wins the sixth season of the Tawag ng Tanghalan segment on It's Showtime.
- May 12 – P-pop boy group BGYO is featured on the Grammy Awards' website as 'Asian pop artists to check out'.
- May 21 – Shane Bernabe of Laguna wins the fifth season of The Voice Kids.
- May 28 – Rex Baculfo of Caloocan wins the fifth season of The Clash.
- June 30 – Viva Records acquires Ivory Music and Video (which formerly distributed the catalog of Sony Music Entertainment in the Philippines during the 2010s).
- July 1 – Sidlak Bisdak, consisting of Marielle Montillano and JM dela Cerna, win the duets edition of the Tawag ng Tanghalan segment on It's Showtime.
- July 27 – Hori7on becomes the first Filipino boy band to debut in South Korea.
- October 6 – Juan Karlos Labajo's song "Ere" becomes the first Filipino song to enter the top 100 of Spotify's global chart.
- October 15 – After 5 years of closure, Billboard Philippines was officially relaunched under new ownership and management, with Bret Jackson as editor-in-chief and Francis Reyes (who previously worked with the said brand as EIC) as editor-at-large.
- November 17 – Filipino contestant Sophia Laforteza wins first place in global reality show Dream Academy, officially joining the six-member girl group Katseye under HYBE and Geffen Records.
- December 10 – Vocalmyx of Cagayan de Oro wins first season of The Voice Generations.
- December 14 – The 8th Asia Artist Awards was held at the Philippine Arena in Bocaue, Bulacan.
- December:
  - Ben&Ben was hailed as the Top Local Streaming Artist of 2023 on Spotify.
  - "Pasilyo", a track by Filipino pop rock band SunKissed Lola, was hailed as the Top Local Streaming Song of 2023 on Spotify.

== Debuting acts ==
=== Bands ===
- 1621BC
- AJAA
- Bilib
- Blvck Purple
- Dear Dahlia
- Eclipse
- Hori7on
- HYV
- Lylee
- Madam
- Moontyde
- Pluus
- The LiVeRARY
- The New Beginning
- Ultraviolet
- Ver5us
- Yes My Love

=== Solo artists ===
- Atasha Muhlach
- Bela
- Carren Eistrup
- Drei Sugay
- Ica Frias
- Imogen
- Josh Cullen
- Kai Buizon
- Lian Dyogi (previously known as Lian Kyla)
- Lizzie Aguinaldo
- Lyka Estrella
- Maffi Papin Carrion
- Mint Magic
- Misha de Leon
- Rex Baculfo
- Shanni
- Sheena Palad
- Totâ (Josh Villena)
- Viñas DeLuxe

== Reuniting acts ==
- The Dawn

== Disbanded ==
- PPop Generation

== Released in 2023 ==
=== First quarter ===
==== January ====
Date	Single / album	Artist(s)	Genre(s)	Label(s)	Ref.
5	BLOW!	Karencitta	Hip hop/rap	Def Jam Philippines (UMG Philippines)	
5	Parola	Moonstar88	Pop rock	Soupstar Music	
6	Tama Nga Sila	I Belong to the Zoo	Alternative	Orchard Music	
6	Butterflies	Denise Julia	R&B/soul	Independent (c/o Ditto Music)	
6	White Toyota	SunKissed Lola	Pop	Independent (c/o Ditto Music)	
13	One Click Straight	One Click Straight	Rock	Island Records Philippines (UMG Philippines)	
13	Earth	The Dawn	Rock	Independent (c/o Ditto Music)	
13	Content Ako Sa'yo	Gracenote feat. Chito Miranda	Pop	Universal Records	
14	Oras	Jason Marvin	Pop	Sony Music Philippines	
15	Bouncing the Standards	RJ Jacinto	Rock, Standards, Blues, Jazz	RJ Productions	
19	ROCKSTA	Felip	Pop rock	Warner Music Philippines	
19	Piraso	Barbie Almalbis, Mark Escueta, Pochoy Labog, Jarlo Base	Rock	Waterwalk Records	
20	Hilom	Better Days	Pop rock	Universal Records	
20	Aminin Mo Na	Jireh Lim	Pop	Warner Music Philippines	
20	Sagi	Paul Pablo	Pop	Warner Music Philippines	
20	More Than Friends	Yuan Estrada, Dave Anonuevo	Pop	Warner Music Philippines	
20	Ikaw at Sila	Moira Dela Torre	Pop	Just Music (Cornerstone Music)	
20	Lockdown Sessions	Iñigo Pascual	Pop	Tarsier Records	
20	Ayoko Na	Ica Frias	Pop	Off the Record	
20	O Sana, Hosanna	Jarlo Base	Pop	Sony Music Philippines	
20	Pagtanda	Oh, Flamingo!	Rock	Sony Music Philippines	
21	Turn Up	KAIA	P-pop	Sony Music Philippines	
24	The Meadows	Kai Buizon	Pop	Sony Music Philippines	
26	I Want To Be Here	Kiana V., Nix Damn P, Curtismith	Pop	Vitamin Marketing; KonsultaMD	
27	The Way You Look at Me	Ben&Ben	Pop	Universal Records	
27	Dahan-Dahan	Mizael	Pop	Universal Records	
27	Hiwaga	Carlo	Pop	Viva Records	
27	Akin Ka	Zack Tabudlo	Pop	Republic Records Philippines (UMG Philippines)	
27	Take My Time	Issa Rodriguez	Pop	Mustard Music	
27	Pagdududa	LEILA	Pop	YR Music, Sony Music Philippines	
27	Chapters (EP)	Garret Bolden	Pop	GMA Music	
27	Halimaw	jikamarie	Pop	Warner Music Philippines	
27	Lourdes 2088	Moonstar88	Pop rock	Soupstar Music, Warner Music Philippines	
27	Different	Clara Benin	Indie pop	Offmute	
27	G.K.Y.A.M.	Adie	Indie pop	O/C Records	
27	Diyan Ka Magaling	Matthaios feat. Deypi	Hip hop/rap	Midas Records	
27	Puyat	kiyo feat. YVNG PESO	Hip hop/rap	dyecast	
27	I'm Feeling Sexy Tonight	Viñas DeLuxe	LGBT	Tarsier Records	
27	MNLUV	Press Hit Play	P-pop	Evolution Media	
31	Problem Child	1st.One	P-pop	Warner Music Philippines	
31	Sober	King Badger	Hip hop/rap	Panty Droppaz League	

==== February ====
Date	Single / album	Artist(s)	Genre(s)	Label(s)	Ref.
1	Reckless	Lilfina	Pop	Sony Music Philippines	
2	Ibang Mundo	Baet Alcantara	Pop	Sony Music Philippines	
2	COM•PLEX (EP)	Felip	Hip hop/rap	Warner Music Philippines	
3	Ganito Pala	Marion Aunor	Pop	Wild Dream Records	
3	Love Is in the Air	Billy Crawford	Pop	Viva Records	
3	Sige Padayon	John Roa	Pop	Viva Records	
3	Tara	Eloisa	Alternative pop	YR Music, Sony Music Philippines	
3	Manila Time Machine Volume 1 (EP)	Ang Bagong Luto ni Enriquez	Alternative	Island Records Philippines (UMG Philippines)	
4	Alam Ko Na	DENȲ, Just Hush, Third Flo	Pop	WAYBETTR, Viva Records	
9	If You Come Back to Me	The Vowels They Orbit	Pop rock	Sony Music Philippines	
10	Tunay na Pag-Ibig	The Knobs	Pop rock	Universal Records	
10	BORED? (Hope You're Happy)	Paolo Sandejas	Pop	Universal Records	
10	Hakbang	I Belong to the Zoo	Alternative	Orchard Music	
10	Outsourced	The Cokeheads, N. Koala, Ez Mil	Rock	Enterphil Entertainment Corporation	
10	Just Because	Mrld	Pop	O/C Records	
10	Eto Na Naman Tayo	Jireh Lim	Pop	Warner Music Philippines	
10	PAANO?	Arthur Miguel	Pop	Warner Music Philippines	
10	Sad Shit	MC Einstein	Pop	Halfway House	
10	Love You 'Til the End	Nicole Abuda	Pop	Viva Records	
10	Bukas	FourplayMNL, Janine Teñoso	Pop	Viva Records	
10	Isang Halik	Jonas Dichoso	Pop	Evolution Media	
10	Aking Sinta	Zildjian	Pop	Ivory Music and Video	
10	Ride	Psalms David	Pop	GMA Music	
10	Dulo	VXON	P-pop	Just Music (Cornerstone Music)	
10	Wanted	Chris Sta. Romana	Indie pop	Independent (c/o Ditto Music)	
10	Floating	OSTN	R&B/soul	Independent (c/o Ditto Music)	
10	JTOWN (PM)	Young Cocoa	Hip hop/rap	Offmute	
10	Manatili	Alisson Shore	Hip hop/rap	Labyrinth Music	
12	Wake Up	Michael Pacquiao	Hip hop/rap	Oblivion Paradise	
13	Flowers & Chocolates	Eyedress	Pop	Sony Music Entertainment	
14	ZACK: For All	Zack Tabudlo	Pop, Manila sound	Republic Records Philippines (UMG Philippines)	
14	Hiling	Lil Vinceyy, Jonmark	Hip hop/rap	Independent	
14	Himig Ng Puso	Sarah Geronimo	Pop	Viva Records; G Productions	
14	Can This Be Love	Zephanie	Pop	GMA Music	
14	Sari-Sari Love Stories (EP)	Fred Engay	Pop	Orieland	
15	Cloud Nine	Night Over Alaska	Pop	YR Music, Sony Music Philippines	
17	Tadhana	Ace Banzuelo	Pop	Sony Music Philippines	
17	O Ninanais	Arthur Nery	Pop	Viva Records	
17	Entablado	Noah Alejandre	Pop	Warner Music Philippines	
17	Nung Naging Tayo	Amiel Aban	Pop	Warner Music Philippines	
17	Kapalaran	Gary Valenciano	Pop	Star Music	
17	Bitaw	Poppert Bernadas, Regine Velasquez	Pop	ABS-CBN Film Productions	
17	Ligaw na Bala	Mico Angeles	Pop	Enterphil Entertainment Corporation	
17	Walang Hangganan	Daniel Paringit	Pop	Island Records Philippines (UMG Philippines)	
17	Buhat	Gloc-9	Hip hop/rap	Universal Records	
17	Minsan Lang	Calvin de Leon	Hip hop/rap	Independent	
17	Tigil	Gracenote	Pop rock	Soupstar Music	
17	Balaraw	Press Hit Play	P-pop	Evolution Media	
17	Tuko	Ganny Brown	Singer-Songwriter	Enterphil Entertainment Corporation	
17	Pinaasa	Quaderno	Rock	Ivory Music and Video	
18	Nervous Breakthrough	Aidan Bernales	Pop/Rock	Independent	
19	Drive Slow	Raf Davis	Hip hop/rap	Independent	
22	Ayoko Ng Katulad Mo	Kunns	Hip hop/rap	Sony Music Philippines	
22	Winner	VER5US	P-pop	Independent	
22	Akin Na Lang Syota Mo	Eugene Layug	Pop	O/C Records	
23	Like Me Now?	DZ SVG (feat. Yuan)	Hip hop/rap	Independent	
24	Wild Tonight	Josh Cullen	Hip hop/rap, Trap	Sony Music Philippines	
24	Y.G.G.	Shanti Dope, HELLMERRY	Hip hop/rap	Universal Records	
24	Tulo Laway	Kiyo	Hip hop/rap	dyecast	
24	TIM	Meek & Chill	Hip hop/rap	Music Colony Records, Warner Music Philippines	
24	Boomerang	G22	P-pop	UMG Philippines	
24	Matapang	Vivoree	Pop	Star Music	
24	Ganun Talaga	Drei Sugay	Pop	Star Music	
24	Disaster	Aloura	Pop	Warner Music Philippines	
24	Come Inside My Heart (Sped Up/Slowed Version)	IV of Spades	Indie rock	Warner Music Philippines	
24	Young Love	LouisVint (featuring Steven Peregrina)	Dance, EDM	Warner Music Philippines	
28	Sikat ng Araw	Munimuni	Alternative folk	Sony Music Philippines	

==== March ====
Date	Single / album	Artist(s)	Genre(s)	Label(s)	Ref.
1	Ulit-ulit	Jason Dy	Pop	Star Music	
1	Habang Buhay	Sarah Geronimo	Pop	Viva Records; G Productions	
1	Catch Me	Barbie Almalbis, Melody del Mundo	Pop rock	Sony Music Philippines	
3	Kalangitan	Nobita	Pop	Sony Music Philippines	
3	Ang Pag-ibig	Rob Deniel	Pop	Vicor Records	
3	Nakangiti	Wilbert Ross	Pop	Viva Records	
3	Respeto	Fred Engay	Pop	Orieland	
3	ANLALA!	Frizzle Anne	Pop	O/C Records	
3	Baka Bukas	Sud	Alternative	Warner Music Philippines	
3	Lakbay	Dice 1ne	Hip hop/rap	Independent	
3	I Wanna Know	Ian Sndrz, LVKE, Juliana Celine	Dance pop	Sora Music Group, Warner Music Philippines	
9	Plano	TJ Monterde	Pop	Independent	
9	Araw	Carissa	Pop	Tower of Doom Music	
10	Walang Kapalit	KZ Tandingan	Pop	CS Music	
10	Ayokong Masanay	Jireh Lim feat. jikamarie	Pop	Warner Music Philippines	
10	Sabihin Mo	Ica Frias	Pop	Off the Record	
10	bababye	Arron Rebustes	Pop	PolyEast Records	
10	Always It's You	Jon Guelas	Pop	Tarsier Records	
10	Tataya	Cup of Joe	Pop rock	Viva Records	
10	Di Man Lang Sinabi	Agsunta	Pop rock	Bauhaus	
10	tuloy tuloy tuloy! (EP)	The Vowels They Orbit	Alternative	Sony Music Philippines	
10	ADDA	YARA	P-pop	Sony Music Philippines	
10	Hanggang Tingin Ka Lang	PPOP Generation	P-pop	Viva Records	
15	Paretes	Flict G feat. Tikyo	Hip hop/rap	Sony Music Philippines	
17	Bagay Nga Tayo	Janine Berdin	Pop	ABS-CBN Film Productions	
17	Sampu	Fred Engay	Pop	Orieland	
17	Damag	SunKissed Lola feat. shortone	Pop	Independent via Ditto Music	
17	Sa Aking Daigdig	Hannah Precillas	Pop	GMA Music	
17	Bida Next (EP)	Carren Eistrup, Kimpoy Feliciano, Sheena Palad	Pop	Curve Entertainment	
17	5678	KAIA	P-pop	Sony Music Philippines	
17	Ugnayan	Calista	P-pop	Merlion Events Productions	
17	Rhythm	Yes My Love	P-pop	Just Music (Cornerstone Music)	
17	Wala Na Ba	Press Hit Play	P-pop	Evolution Media	
17	Alawkulay	HYV	P-pop	Independent	
17	Tiktiktokin	Playertwo	Hip hop/rap	Warner Music Philippines	
17	Muntik	Omar Baliw	Hip hop/rap	Kalmado Records	
17	24 Oras	Rhythm and Drip	Hip hop/rap	O/C Records	
17	Ikaw Pa Rin	Dice 1ne	Hip hop/rap	Independent	
17	Soul Ties	Illest Morena	Hip hop/rap	Independent	
17	Hele	Magnus Haven	Alternative	Black Sheep Productions	
17	Luha Ng Kaaway	Valley of Chrome	Metalcore	Tower of Doom	
17	Insomnia	OSTN	R&B/soul	Independent via Ditto Music	
22	Dash	Hori7on	P-pop	MLD Entertainment	
22	Gabay (EP)	syd hartha	R&B/soul	Sony Music Philippines	
22	Hiraya Manawari	Jose at Melodiya	Hip hop/rap	Independent	
22	Nothing is Impossible (Tagalog Version)	Gloryfall	Christian	Waterwalk Records	
24	If	Mrld	Pop	O/C Records	
24	Kung Ako	Noel Cabangon	Pop	Widescope Entertainment	
24	BINI	Jeremy Glinoga	Pop	ABS-CBN Film Productions	
24	Belo (Ang Damit Mo Na Suot)	Hey Its Je	Pop	Independent	
24	Laging Sa Tabi Mo	Joshua Mari	Pop	Independent	
24	Huli Na Ba	Daiv Justn	Pop	Viva Records	
24	Sansinukob (EP)	Dilaw	Indie rock	Warner Music Philippines	
24	Masaya	I Belong to the Zoo	Alternative	Orchard Music	
24	Babalik Ba	Alisson Shore	Hip hop/rap	Labyrinth Music	
24	WRGD.	Mac Mafia	Hip hop/rap	Independent	
24	PangaRAP	Dank Puffs, Bassilyo, Smugglaz	Hip hop/rap	Independent	
24	SURPRISE	8 Ballin'	Hip hop/rap	Def Jam Philippines (UMG Philippines)	
24	BLOW! (Remix)	Karencitta feat. Zae, Tiffany Lhei	Dance	Def Jam Philippines (UMG Philippines)	
24	Panic in my Mind	The Itchyworms	Pop Rock	Sony Music Philippines	
24	Tagahanga	Mona Gonzales	P-pop	Sony Music Philippines	
24	Colors	Manila Luzon	LGBT	Warner Music Philippines	
24	Daydreaming	Marga Jayy	R&B/soul	Independent via Ditto Music	
29	Sunday	Raven	Pop	Sony Music Philippines	
30	Tabi Gabi Gabi	Jarlo Base	R&B/soul	Sony Music Philippines	
30	Magbago Ka Na	Shamrock	Rock	Independent	
31	PLUUS +.Y.M.	Pluus	P-pop	Universal Records	
31	Breaking Bad	Vxon	P-pop	Just Music	
31	Eme	Moira Dela Torre	Pop	Just Music	
31	Kunwari	Daniel Paringit	Pop	Island Records Philippines (UMG Philippines)	
31	Uwian	Joshua Feliciano	Pop	Viva Records	
31	Leonora	Sugarcane	Pop	Warner Music Philippines	
31	Halikan Mo Na Ako	Earl Generao	Pop	O/C Records	
31	Hanggang Sa Dulo	Jem Cubil	Pop	O/C Records	
31	Ilang Beses Kita Mamahalin?	December Avenue	Alternative	Tower of Doom Music	
31	3 in 1	Jamie Rivera	Contemporary Christian	Star Music	
31	remember?	Jason Dhakal	R&B/soul	Warner Music Philippines	

=== Second quarter ===
==== April ====
Date	Single / album	Artist(s)	Genre(s)	Label(s)	Ref.
5	Corvette	Michael Pacquiao	Hip hop/rap	Oblivion Paradise	
5	Salamat	Hori7on	P-pop	MLD Entertainment	
7	ULAN	Skusta Clee, Jnskie, Lil-P, J-King	Hip hop/rap	Evolution Media	
7	Nauna Na Kitang Mahalin	Erik Santos	Contemporary Christian	Jesuit Music Ministry	
11	Hearts on Ice (Original Soundtrack)	Hannah Precillas, Crystal Paras	Pop	GMA Playlist	
12	Break You Down	DIONE	P-pop	FirstOne Entertainment	
13	Vivid	BGYO	P-pop	Star Music	
14	Hanggang Sa Buwan	Kenaniah	Pop	O/C Records	
14	Aftertaste	Paolo Sandejas	Pop	Universal Records	
14	Kapit	Sam Concepcion	Pop	Universal Records	
14	Pahina	Jireh Lim	Pop	Warner Music Philippines	
14	Babalik	Rangel	Pop	Warner Music Philippines	
14	Taluso	Hey Its Je	Pop	Independent	
14	Poster Boy	Lyn Lapid	Pop	Republic Records Philippines (UMG Philippines)	
14	Di Na Ako	Anna Aquino	Pop	PolyEast Records	
14	Paraiso	Anji Salvacion	Pop	Tarsier Records	
14	Gusto Kitang Pasalamatan	Teetin Villanueva	Pop	DNA Music	
14	Stay Right Here (Summer Remix)	Alexa Ilacad	Pop	Off the Record, UMG Philippines	
14	Wag Ka Nang Umiyak	Bandang Lapis	Pop	Viva Records	
14	Right Time	JRoa	Hip hop/rap	Viva Records	
14	Marupokpok	Jonas Dichoso	Hip hop/rap	Evolution Media	
14	ICHIGO MIRUKU	Ena Mori, Tomggg	J-pop	GMP Records	
15	AsaKaBwoii	Apekz	Hip hop/rap	Independent	
17	Bagay Nga Tayo Pero	Janine Berdin	Pop	Star Music	
18	Swerte	Alex Gonzaga	Pop	Panty Droppaz League	
18	Sa Huli	Kevin Luna	Pop	Tower of Doom	
19	Yakap	Alyssa	Pop	O/C Records	
19	Kung Hindi Susubukan	Janno Gibbs	Pop	Viva Records	
21	Diba	Zack Tabudlo	Pop	Republic Records Philippines (UMG Philippines)	
21	BLOOM (EP)	Paolo Sandejas	Pop	Universal Records	
21	Small Town	Clara Benin	Pop	Offmute	
21	Di Lahat Minamahal	Arthur Miguel	Pop	Warner Music Philippines	
21	Sa Iyong Mga Mata	Kat Agarrado	Pop	Warner Music Philippines	
21	Heto Pa Rin Ako	Kaye Cal	Pop	Independent	
21	Langit, Lupa, Impiyerno	Fred Engay	Pop	Orieland	
21	Respeto	Sheryn Regis, JMRTN	Pop	Star Music	
21	Only Girl	Kice	Pop	Star Music	
21	Lihim	Mark Carpio	Pop	Viva Records	
21	Balewala	Julia Daniel	Pop	YR Music, Sony Music Philippines	
21	Dambana	Magnus Haven	Pop rock	Black Sheep Productions	
21	LASIK	Hey June!	Pop rock	Island Records Philippines (UMG Philippines)	
21	Sa'yo (Ang Mundo)	Nameless Kids	Pop rock	Tarsier Records	
21	Pakiusap Lang	Josh Cullen	Pop, Rap	Sony Music Philippines	
21	Peste	Flict G, OG Sacred, Rapido	Hip hop/rap	Sony Music Philippines	
21	Byahe	1096 Gang	Hip hop/rap	Independent	
22	Sasabihin Ko Na	Wilbert Ross	Pop	Viva Records	
24	Sayonara	The New Beginning	Pop	Independent	
25	Nyare	Sandwich	Rock	PolyEast Records	
26	Gunita	End Street	Rock	Tower of Doom	
28	Pag-Ibig (Meron Ba?)	Ace Banzuelo	Pop	Sony Music Philippines	
28	The Fate of the One Not Chosen	Mrld	Pop	O/C Records	
28	AUTODEADMA	Maymay Entrata feat. Wooseok	Pop	Star Music	
28	Tingin	Cup of Joe, Janine Teñoso	Pop	Viva Records	
28	Paalam, Leonora	Sugarcane	Pop	Warner Music Philippines	
28	Lisan	Vilmark Viray	Pop	GMA Music	
28	Bakante	Omar Baliw, Rhyne	Hip hop/rap	Kalmado Records	
28	Kwentong Barbero	Gloc-9	Hip hop/rap	Independent	
28	Seek First	Quest	Hip hop/rap	Warner Music Philippines	
28	MULTIVERSE	Nik Makino, Lo Ki	Hip hop/rap	Diamond Management	
28	Back Home	The Juans	Pop rock	Viva Records	
28	Ating Dalawa	Over October	Alternative	Island Records, UMG Philippines	
28	Papatungo (City Bop Remix)	No Lore	Alternative	Off the Record, UMG Philippines	
28	Bum 2 Me	Denise Julia	R&B/soul	Independent	
28	Disco Plantito, Disco Plantita (Discoteca Pandemica Remix)	The Company	Disco	Star Music	

==== May ====
Date	Single / album	Artist(s)	Genre(s)	Label(s)	Ref.
1	Rampa	Vice Ganda	Pop, LGBT	Star Music	
1	Take It Higher (Sky High)	Belle Mariano	Pop	Star Music	
1	Simbolo Ng Pahinga	Geiko	Pop	Independent	
1	TAONG ROBOT	Gracenote	Pop rock	Soupstar Music	
2	SAMBAHAN	Various artists	Contemporary Christian	Waterwalk Records	
3	Wide Awake	Raf Davis	Hip hop/rap	The Real Deal	
3	Kabaliktaran	Zynfinity, DIXE, drmfy	Hip hop/rap	Dreamify Records	
4	Jeepney	Brisom	Alternative pop	Sony Music Philippines	
5	Anymore	Ateneo Chamber Singers	Contemporary Christian	Jesuit Music Ministry	
5	Paki Sabi	SunKissed Lola	Pop	Independent (c/o Ditto Music)	
5	Ako Ba O Siya?	Katrina Velarde	Pop	Viva Records	
5	Sayaw	Jude Pastor	Pop	Viva Records	
5	Oh Halika	Hey Its Je	Pop	Independent	
5	Just For You	Jed Madela, DJ M.O.D., Darren and Cashwell	Pop	Star Music	
5	Da Da Da	Imogen	Pop	Star Music	
5	Cupcake	Hazel Faith	Pop	Sony Music Philippines	
5	Tingin	Lucas Miguel	Pop	Underdog Music PH	
5	Di Ka Mag-Iisa (Re-release)	Jordan Bautista	Pop	UMG Philippines	
5	Kamusta Ka Na	Gloc-9	Hip hop/rap	Universal Records	
5	'Di Lang Sa Una Magaling	Matthaios	Hip hop/rap	Midas Records	
5	Betty Bruce	Alex Bruce	Hip hop/rap	Sony Music Philippines	
5	CEB to MNL	Kyle Zagado	Hip hop/rap	Campus Music Records	
5	habangbuhay / habang buhay	Dom Guyot featuring Janine Berdin	R&B/soul	Republic Records Philippines (UMG Philippines)	
5	Malikmata	Tota	Alternative	Off the Record, UMG Philippines	
5	Parang Magic	Toneejay	Alternative	Marilag Records International	
5	Electric Summer	Jenil, LouisVint, Juliana Celine	EDM	Sora Music Group, Warner Music Philippines	
8	Takits	Yuridope	Hip hop/rap	The Dope Music	
8	LUNES	Calvin de Leon	Pop	Independent	
10	Sa Paglayag	Sarah Geronimo	Pop	Viva Records; G Productions	
10	Hanggang Kailan	EJ De Perio	Pop	Sony Music Philippines	
12	Serenata: Well-loved Filipino Folk Songs and Melodies (Album)	Philippine Philharmonic Orchestra (feat. Ryan Cayabyab)	Classical	Cultural Center of the Philippines; Widescope Entertainment	
12	143	Mayonnaise	Alternative	YR Music, Sony Music Philippines	
12	So Fire	James Reid	Pop	Careless Music	
12	Come To Bed	Chlara	Pop	Evolution Media	
12	Kapit Lang	Benedict Cua	Pop	PolyEast Records	
12	Pahinga	Kenneth Amores, Bugs, Papayasoak	Pop	Island Records, UMG Philippines	
18	Going Home '82	Join the Club	Alternative	Independent	
19	Nasa 'King Damdamin	Arthur Nery	Pop	Viva Records	
19	Masungit	Jireh Lim	Pop	Warner Music Philippines	
19	You'll Figure Things Out	Patrick Magada	Pop	Dreamify Records	
19	Nag-iisa Lang	Regine Velasquez	Pop	Star Music	
19	Liham	Matt Lozano	Pop	GMA Music	
19	Ituro Mo	Renz Verano	Pop	PolyEast Records	
19	6SENSE	Karencitta	Hip hop/rap	Def Jam Philippines (UMG Philippines)	
19	Papalayo II	VVS Collective	Hip hop/rap	Def Jam Philippines (UMG Philippines)	
19	Reyna	J-King	Hip hop/rap	Evolution Media	
19	Sayaw	Nobrvnd	Hip hop/rap	Warner Music Philippines	
19	Bae You	Jay R, Kris Lawrence, CLR	R&B/soul	Homeworkz Entertainment	
19	GENTO	SB19	P-pop	Sony Music Philippines	
19	Mr. Sun	RadRed	Alternative	Star Music	
19	Dust	Chicosci	Rock	Tower of Doom	
24	Ikaw Pa Rin	Jason Marvin	Pop	Sony Music Philippines	
26	Gusto	Zack Tabudlo feat. Al James	Pop	Republic Records Philippines (UMG Philippines)	
26	Salamin	Fred Engay	Pop	Orieland	
26	Since I Found You	Zephanie Dimaranan	Pop	Universal Records	
26	Love Led Us Here	KD Estrada	Pop	Star Music	
26	Damdamin	Misha de Leon	Pop	Star Music	
26	4 Myself	AC Bonifacio	Pop	Tarsier Records	
26	Ba't Maangas Ka?	Smugglaz	Hip hop/rap	Independent	
26	Slide	8 Ballin'	Hip hop/rap	Def Jam Philippines (UMG Philippines)	
26	Buti Na Lang	Kris Lawrence	R&B/soul	Homeworkz Entertainment	
26	honeymoon (EP)	Tala	Indie pop	Pool Records, Sony Music Philippines	
28	Sunbeam	Michael Pacquiao	Hip hop/rap	Oblivion Paradise	
30	My Cure	Acel	Pop	Sony Music Philippines	
31	Lovey Dovey	Hori7on	Pop	MLD Entertainment	
31	Sinta	Raven	Pop	Sony Music Philippines	
31	Dulo	David Reyeg	Pop	O/C Records	

==== June ====
Date	Single / album	Artist(s)	Genre(s)	Label(s)	Ref.
1	Takaw Tingin	Paul Pablo	Pop	Warner Music Philippines	
2	You Are Everything (from Unbreak My Heart)	Christian Bautista	Pop	Universal Records	
2	Kailan Pa Ma'y Ikaw	KZ Tandingan	Pop	Universal Records	
2	It's Complicated	Timmy Albert	Pop	Universal Records	
2	Dalawang Isip	Vivoree	Pop	Star Music	
2	Baka Pwede Na	Lizzie Aguinaldo	Pop	Star Music	
2	Hatinggabi	Jeiven	Pop	Island Records Philippines (UMG Philippines)	
2	Mirasol	Jose at Melodiya	Pop	Independent	
2	Oras Ko 'To	Rex Baculfo	Pop	GMA Music	
2	ALMA	krisostomo	Hip hop/rap	Viva Records	
8	Spark the Dream	Elha Nympha	Pop	Republic Records Philippines (UMG Philippines)	
9	Pagtatag! (EP)	SB19	P-pop	Sony Music Philippines	
9	Doob Doob	YGIG	P-pop	Universal Records	
9	Hangganan	Sarah Geronimo, Jin Chan	Pop	Viva Records; G Productions	
9	Silong	Juan Caoile	Pop	Viva Records	
9	Mayari	Dom Guyot	Pop	Republic Records Philippines (UMG Philippines)	
9	Only Have Today	Lian Dyogi	Pop	Star Music	
9	Payday	Nik Makino, JWolf, Pizza Palace	Hip hop/rap	Independent	
9	Asinta	Kushin, J-em Dahon, King Lheanard	Hip hop/rap	Viva Records	
9	Thinkin of Love	PLAYERTWO	Hip hop/rap	Warner Music Philippines	
9	Kapayapaan	Munimuni	Alternative folk	Sony Music Philippines	
9	Mamahalin Mo Ba Ako?	MOJOFLY	Pop rock	Sony Music Philippines	
9	Paglaya	Here+Now	Pop rock	Independent	
9	Dahan-dahan	Sandiwa	Alternative rock	Universal Records	
9	Next 2 Me	Struggail	Jazz	Star Music	
12	Ps	CLR feat. Gloc-9	Hip hop/rap	Independent	
14	Raining in Manila	Lola Amour	Alternative rock	Warner Music Philippines	
14	The Morning After	The Itchyworms	Rock	Sony Music Philippines	
14	May Iba Na Ba?	Jemay Santiago	Pop	Sony Music Philippines	
15	Day and Night	Alamat	P-pop	Viva Records	
16	Delikado	dwta	Pop	Sony Music Philippines	
16	Di Na Ako	Chrstn	Pop	O/C Records	
16	Liham Sa Ulap	KYLIX	Pop	Universal Records	
16	Aking Tangi	Drei Sugay	Pop	Star Music	
16	Wala Silang Mapapala	Jana Garcia	Pop	Independent	
16	Tibok	Earl Agustin	Pop	Vicor Music	
16	PREETY PLEASE	VXON	P-pop	Republic Records Philippines (UMG Philippines)	
16	Fadeaway	Young Cocoa	Hip hop/rap	Offmute	
16	GEDLI	Kyle Zagado	Hip hop/rap	Campus Music Records	
16	Walang Gana	Kushin, Yuridope	Hip hop/rap	Viva Records	
16	Ride or Die	Raf Davis	Hip hop/rap	The Real Deal	
16	Flow	Patrick Magada, drmfy	Hip hop/rap	Dreamify Records	
21	Make You Mine	Just Hush	Hip hop/rap	Viva Records	
21	Silly Hoes	CK YG, HELLMERRY	Hip hop/rap	Ghost Worldwide	
23	Overgrown	Nadine Lustre, Wild	Pop	Wild Recordings	
23	May Halaga Ba Ako Sa'yo?	Juan Karlos	Pop	Island Records Philippines (UMG Philippines)	
23	Sintunadong Harana	Iluna	Pop	Evolution Media	
23	Yan Ang Pinoy	Eclipse	Pop	Merlion Entertainment	
23	Dito Ka Na Lang	KZ Tandingan	Pop	Star Music	
23	Somber (EP)	Belle Mariano	Pop	Star Music	
23	To Love in the 21st Century (EP)	Lyn Lapid	Pop	Republic Records Philippines (UMG Philippines)	
23	Hey Its Je: Album One	Hey Its Je	Pop	Independent	
23	Gold	Fred Engay	Pop	Orieland	
23	Patintero	JC Herrero	Pop	Warner Music Philippines	
23	Kaibigan	1096 Gang	Hip hop/rap	Independent	
23	Hey Shawty	J emm Dahon	Hip hop/rap	Viva Records	
Oras	Carissa	Alternative	Tower of Doom		
25	Let Me	Denise Julia, Milky Day	R&B/soul	Unbound Records	
28	If We Never Happened	Morissette	Pop	Underdog Music PH	
28	Habulan	Pinkmen (feat. Ely Buendia)	Alternative	Offshore Music	
28	Tatsulok	St. Wolf	Alternative	Independent	
28	Champions	Sponge Cola	Pop rock	Sony Music Philippines	
28	Chapters (EP)	Loir	R&B/soul	Sony Music Philippines	
28	Coastline	Gabba	Rock	A Spur of the Moment Project	
30	Wala Nang Iba	December Avenue, Belle Mariano	Alternative	Tower of Doom Music	
30	Could Be Something	Ben&Ben	Alternative	Sony Music Philippines	
30	Ginanun Lang	Noah Alejandre	Pop	Warner Music Philippines	
30	Silay	Jeff Grecia	Pop	Independent	
30	Sandig	Janine Teñoso	Pop	Viva Records	
30	Bakit?	Maki	Pop	Tarsier Records	
30	Nasunog	Khimo	Pop	Star Music	
30	Reyna	SV Squad	Pop	SV Music	
30	Hiraya	Matthaios, Southrll	Hip hop/rap	Midas Records	
30	Pambihira	Quest	Hip hop/rap	Warner Music Philippines	
30	Magayon	Lil Vinceyy	Hip hop/rap	Independent	
30	AMIGO	Manila Bombsquad, Katsy Lee	EDM	Sora Music Group, Warner Music Philippines	
30	Patutunguhan (EP)	Cup of Joe	Pop rock	Viva Records	

=== Third quarter ===
==== July ====
Date	Single / album	Artist(s)	Genre(s)	Label(s)	Ref.
6	Palagi	TJ Monterde	Pop	Independent	
7	Paruparo Ng Walang Hanggan	Nobita	Pop	Sony Music Philippines	
7	Kenaniah (EP)	Kenaniah	Pop	O/C Records	
7	Gabi	Juan Karlos (feat. Zild)	Pop	Island Records Philippines (UMG Philippines)	
7	Panatag Sa'yo	Shortone	Pop	Independent	
7	Borrowed	Issa Rodriguez	Pop	Mustard Music	
7	Universe (EP)	Bela	Pop	Underdog Music PH	
7	What Matters Most	Nicole Laurel Asensio	Pop	Warner Music Philippines	
7	Flying Kites	The Juans	Pop rock	Viva Records	
7	Kabanata	BILIB	P-pop	AQ Prime Music	
7	BB	YGIG	P-pop	Universal Records	
7	Malaya	J King	Hip hop/rap	Evolution Media	
7	Preety Girls	Ayip	Hip hop/rap	Baybayin Records	
7	Piraso	El Cide	Hip hop/rap	Independent	
8	Klima	Jong	Hip hop/rap	Independent	
10	Mini Miss U	Imogen	Pop	Star Music	
12	Bitin	VVS Collective	Hip hop/rap	Def Jam Philippines (UMG Philippines)	
14	Hamon ng Mundo	Yeng Constantino	Pop	Vehnee Saturno Music	
14	Sinulit	Mint Magic	Pop	Warner Music Philippines	
14	Songs From Home (EP)	Ogie Alcasid	Pop	Star Music	
14	Ms. Ukay	Kim Chiu	Pop	Star Music	
14	Hawak Mo (from Nag-aapoy na Damdamin)	Lyka Estrella	Pop	Star Music	
14	Sana Dati	Jonas Dichoso	Pop	Evolution Media	
14	You Don't Deserve Me	Patrick Magada	Pop	Dreamify Records	
14	Hiling	Magnus Haven	Alternative	Black Sheep Productions	
14	Sa Tingin Ko	day one	Alternative	Underdog Music PH	
14	Wag Mahiya	Teys	Hip hop/rap	404 Music	
14	Makakarating	Lua$	Hip hop/rap	Independent	
14	Oras	1st.One	P-pop	Warner Music Philippines	
14	Pangako	Dione	P-pop	Warner Music Philippines	
14	Basically Speaking	Bobby Velasco	Jazz	Evolution Media	
18	Araw-araw	Abaddon (feat. Ms. Yumi and Jose at Melodya)	Pop	Sony Music Philippines	
19	In the End	Sponge Cola	Pop rock	Sony Music Philippines	
20	Anghel	Dro Perez	Hip hop/rap	Independent	
21	Hay Buhay	Nobita	Pop	Sony Music Philippines	
21	Okay Lang Ako 3	Iñigo Pascual	Pop	Republic Records Philippines (UMG Philippines)	
21	Cold	Jon Guelas, Moophs	Pop	Tarsier Records	
21	Tell Me Now	YNISH	Pop	Dreamify Records	
21	Been You	Y ARA	Pop	Warner Music Philippines	
21	Paulit-ulit (Sorry Na)	Chelly	Pop	314 Studios	
21	Kasunod	Erik Santos	Pop	Star Music	
21	Lato-Lato	Lizzie Aguinaldo	Pop	Star Music	
21	Night Bloom (EP)	Mica Caldito	Pop	Curve Entertainment	
21	Copy Paste	Clien, Jom, and ALLMO$T	Hip hop/rap	Viva Records	
21	Asian Beauty	Karl Wine, JRoa, Alisson Shore	Hip hop/rap	Nara Music	
21	We Gon Shot	Kyle Zagado, Kydd Curtis	Hip hop/rap	Campus Music Records	
21	Tiramisu	Sica	Hip hop/rap	Greenhouse Records	
21	YLGOIVGE (EP)	YGIG	P-pop	Universal Records	
21	Horizon	Ysanygo	R&B/soul	Underdog Music PH	
21	P4n4ginip	Zo Zo	R&B/soul	Independent	
21	Plastic	Wonggoys	Funk	Independent	
23	It's You	Illest Morena	Hip hop/rap	Independent	
24	Friend-Ship	Hori7on	Dance	MLD Entertainment	
26	Recollections	Gabba	Rock	A Spur of the Moment Project	
26	Back It Up	VVS Collective	Hip hop/rap	Def Jam Philippines (UMG Philippines)	
28	Kursunada	Adie	Pop	O/C Records	
28	Lihim	Arthur Miguel	Pop	Warner Music Philippines	
28	Keep Still	Clara Benin	Pop	Offmute	
28	Reimagined (EP)	Yeng Constantino	Pop	Republic Records Philippines (UMG Philippines)	
28	Bakit Ka Bumitaw	Annrain	Pop	Star Music	
28	Simula Ng Wakas (EP)	Trisha Denise	Pop	Star Music	
28	Dito Ka Lang	The Edralins	Pop	Warner Music Philippines	
28	Betterfly (Album)	Nobita	Indie pop	Sony Music Philippines	
28	Bara Bara	Gloc-9, G-Clown	Hip hop/rap	Universal Records	
28	Seen	Alisson Shore, Because	Hip hop/rap	Labyrinth Music	
28	Tanggap Ko Naman	MC Einstein	Hip hop/rap	Haftway House	
28	Yayakapin	Yes My Love	P-pop	Republic Records Philippines (UMG Philippines)	
31	Magic	Tamara	Pop	YR Music, Sony Music Philippines	

==== August ====
Date	Single / album	Artist(s)	Genre(s)	Label(s)	Ref.
2	City Fire	Tommie King, Yuridope	Hip hop/rap	Def Jam Philippines (UMG Philippines)	
2	Planeta	Jarlo Base	R&B/soul	Sony Music Philippines	
3	Kaibigan Lang	Kai Buizon	Indie pop	Sony Music Philippines	
3	Ngayong Gabi	Hey Its Je	Pop	Independent	
4	Luna	SunKissed Lola	Pop	Independent	
4	Ere	Juan Karlos	Pop	Island Records Philippines (UMG Philippines)	
4	Sweet Memories	Jolianne	Pop	Careless Music	
4	Isulti Lang (Tell Me)	DJ Young, Paul Pablo	Pop	Warner Music Philippines	
4	Hometown (Part 2)	Sponge Cola	Pop rock	Sony Music Philippines	
4	Tawagan Mo Ako	Matthaios, Dudut, Soulthrll	Hip hop/rap	Midas Records	
4	Down	Omar Baliw	Hip hop/rap	Kalmado Records	
4	Gandamo	J-King, Lil-P	Hip hop/rap	Evolution Media	
4	Missing You	Pluus	P-pop	Universal Records	
4	Lixan	Vxon	P-pop	Republic Records Philippines (UMG Philippines)	
4	Lihim	Clubs	Indie rock	Warner Music Philippines	
5	Lanai (Album)	SV Squad	Pop	SV Music	
9	Out of Time	Brisom	Alternative pop	Sony Music Philippines	
9	VIVID (Reimagined ver.)	Ena Mori	Electronic pop	Offshore Music	
11	Someone New	Paolo Sandejas	Pop	Universal Records	
11	Tanaw	VNCE	Pop	Independent	
11	Love Ya	Chlara	Pop	Evolution Media	
11	Team Tayo	The Juans, SB19	Pop	Sony Music Philippines	
11	Pagkatakot	Lylee, drmfy	Pop	Dreamify Records	
11	Rebirth (EP)	Urbandub	Rock	Warner Music Philippines	
11	Befriending My Tears (Album)	Clara Benin	Indie pop	Offmute	
11	All Eyes on Me	Clien, ALLMO$T, RM Hari	Hip hop/rap	Viva Records	
11	Sigurado	Kylu	Hip hop/rap	Viva Records	
11	Roses	SOS	Indie rock	Careless Music	
12	Walang Hanggan	Alamat	P-pop	Viva Records	
16	Closure	Steven Peregrina	R&B/Soul	Midas Records	
16	Mag-isa	Jason Marvin	Pop	Sony Music Philippines	
17	Hello	Fred Engay	Pop	Orieland	
18	Balang Araw	jikamarie	Pop	Warner Music Philippines	
18	I'm Happier	Patrick Magada	Pop	Dreamify Records	
18	IDILY	Jayda	Pop	Republic Records Philippines (UMG Philippines)	
18	Ikaw Ang Biyaya	DaivJstn, Rish Mel, Shad	Pop	Viva Records	
18	Ikaw Na	Leila	Pop	Sony Music Philippines	
18	Pabalik	Jeremy G	Pop	Star Music	
18	Tsada Mahigugma	Maymay Entrata	Visayan pop	Star Music	
18	Atin-Atin Lang	Al James, Flow G	Hip hop/rap	Independent	
18	Pleasure	Calvin de Leon	Hip hop/rap	Independent	
18	Happy Accidents Vol. 1	Playertwo	Hip hop/rap	Warner Music Philippines	
18	Bounce	Kyle Zagado	Hip hop/rap	Campus Music Records	
18	Bangkok Freestyle	Because, Kiyo	Hip hop/rap	Believe Music	
18	Paano Maging Tayo	This Band, Anthony Meneses	Pop rock	Viva Records	
18	Biglang Taob	Hey June!	Pop rock	Island Records Philippines (UMG Philippines)	
18	Narara	Madam	R&B/soul	O/C Records	
18	Di Mawala	Kwelyo	Alternative rock	Star Music	
18	Lonely	Nameless Kids	Indie rock	Tarsier Records	
20	Good Love	Michael Pacquiao	Hip hop/rap	Oblivion Paradise	
24	S.A.N. (Sana Ako Na)	Ednil Beats	Hip hop/rap	Million Racks Records	
25	Ako Nalang Kasi	Zack Tabudlo	Pop	Republic Records Philippines (UMG Philippines)	
25	RomCom	Rob Daniel	Pop	Vicor Records	
25	Balse ng Gabi (Album)	Cesca	Pop	Star Music	
25	Tunay Na Pag-ibig	JM Bales	Pop	Star Music	
25	Sayaw Ng Mga Tala	Vivoree, Benedix Ramos	Pop	Star Music	
25	Di Na Babalik	Leanne and Naara	Pop	Warner Music Philippines	
25	Pangako	Raven	Pop	Sony Music Philippines	
25	Mamamatay Yata Kong Single	Eugene Layug	Pop	O/C Records	
25	Kaibigan	The LiVeRARY	Pop	PolyEast Records	
25	Sakto	Sitti	Bossa nova	Icons Music	
25	Sa Duyan ng Bayan	Noel Cabangon, Ebe Dancel, Gloc9	Christian rock	Jesuit Music Ministry	
25	What If Ako	Angelo Rudy	R&B/soul	Independent	
26	Say My Name	DENȲ	Pop	WayBettr	
26	Song 4 U	Clien, Jom, ALLMO$T, Ivan G.	Hip hop/rap	Viva Records	
28	Love U Berry Matcha	Jayda, Aljon Mendoza	Pop	Star Music	
31	Simple Lang	EJ de Perio	Pop	Sony Music Philippines	
31	Kahit Na	Dia Mate	Pop	Island Records Philippines (UMG Philippines)	
31	8	Supafly, Because	Hip hop/rap	Greenhouse Records	

==== September ====
Date	Single / album	Artist(s)	Genre(s)	Label(s)	Ref.
1	Treading Water	Sarah Geronimo, Bamboo	Pop	Viva Records; G Productions	
1	SMP	dwta	Pop	Sony Music Philippines	
1	Kita Kita	7th	Pop	O/C Records	
1	Orasa	Dilaw	Indie rock	Warner Music Philippines	
1	Still Waiting	Polaris	Indie rock	Dreamify Records	
1	No Hard Feelings	Denise Julia, Haven	R&B/soul	Wild Group	
1	Blessed	Jay R	R&B/soul	Homeworkz Entertainment	
1	Magdamag (EP)	KV	R&B/soul	JDP Everything Entertainment	
1	Patawa	Danica at Sinag, Daryl Cielo	R&B/soul	Sony Music Philippines	
1	Babygirl	Zelijah	Hip hop/rap	Sony Music Philippines	
1	Drop That	J emm Dahon, King Lheanard	Hip hop/rap	Viva Records	
1	Please Lang	Range, Makii G	Hip hop/rap	Independent	
2	Super Fly	Zae	Hip hop/rap	Rawstarr Records	
2	Good For Ya	Sheki	R&B/soul	Superball Music	
4	Pandoy	MaxyPresko	Hip hop/Rap	Independent	
5	OFW Ako	Still One	Hip hop/Rap	Independent	
6	Dito Muna	Munimuni	Alternative folk	Sony Music Philippines	
6	Sabihin Mo Lang	Jemay Santiago	Hip hop/rap	Sony Music Philippines	
7	4Ü	Ajaa	P-pop	Republic Records Philippines (UMG Philippines)	
8	Oksihina	Dionela, Meizy Mendoza	Pop	UMG Philippines	
8	Hanggang Kailan	Kyla	Pop	Star Music	
8	Iyong Mga Mata	Drei Sugay	Pop	Star Music	
8	Gello Marquez (Album)	Gello Marquez	Pop	Star Music	
8	Ano Ba Talaga	Lorenz	Pop	Universal Records	
8	Kakalimutan	Kyle Raphael	Pop	Viva Records	
8	Legit	Zo Zo	Hip hop/rap	Viva Records	
8	Q	Young Cocoa	Hip hop/rap	Offmute	
8	Opinyon Freestyle	Kyle Zagado	Hip hop/rap	Campus Music Records	
8	Tatapusin Na Natin 'To	Juan Karlos (feat. Paolo Benjamin)	Indie rock	Island Records Philippines (UMG Philippines)	
8	711	Toneejay	Alternative rock	Marilag Recordings International	
8	Whatever's on Your Mind	Ysanygo	R&B/soul	Underdog Music PH	
8	Final Entry/Nakakapagod Na	Mei Teves	Alternative folk	Desserted Space Studio	
8	Boy Bente	Banda Ni Kleggy	Pop rock	Warner Music Philippines	
9	Unsa Tanan	Kurt Fick	Visayan pop	Independent	
9	4:AM	Hellmerry	Hip hop/rap	Young God Records	
13	Lula	Ren	Hip hop/rap	Independent	
13	BEING	Jason Dhakal	R&B/Soul	Warner Music Philippines	
14	Alam Ko Na 'Yan	Rich Flo, MC Einstein	Hip hop/rap	Independent	
14	With U	Calvin de Leon	Pop	Independent	
14	Ibang Araw Na Lang	Sandwich	Pop rock	PolyEast Records	
15	Bibitaw Na	Darren Espanto	Pop	Star Music	
15	Happy Ending	Khimo	Pop	Star Music	
15	I Can't Sleep	Jolianne	Pop	Careless Music	
15	Somebody Like U	Tish Gatan	Pop	Warner Music Philippines	
15	Tama Na Sa'kin Ikaw	JC Regino	Pop	GMA Music	
15	Hold Me	Esang de Torres	Pop	PolyEast Records	
15	Kalamado (Part 3)	Omar Baliw	Hip hop/rap	Kalmado Records	
15	Paglipad	Chocolate Factory (feat. Gloc9)	Hip hop/rap	Independent	
15	Aral	Loonie, Apekz, Ron Henley, Abra	Hip hop/rap	Independent	
15	Magic (Dahil Sa'yo)	Eseeca	Hip hop/rap	314 Studios	
15	Gawk Gawk	MaxyPresko	Hip hop/rap	Independent	
15	Being (Album)	Jason Dhakal	R&B/soul	Warner Music Philippines	
15	Manila in Bloom (Album)	Nameless Kids	Alternative rock	Tarsier Records	
15	Mahalin Nang Tama	Earl Generao	Indie rock	O/C Records	
15	H'wag Kang Mag-Alala	Noel Cabangon	Alternative folk	Widescope Entertainment	
15	Huling Awit	Eliza Maturan	Alternative pop	Ditto Music	
18	Kailangan Sumuko	Still One	Hip hop/rap	Independent	
22	Isang Taong Lumipas	Ryan Cayabyab, Emmy Cayabyab, Krina Cayabyab & Toma Cayabyab	Christmas	Curve Entertainment Inc.	
22	Tanong (EP)	Maki	Pop	Tarsier Records	
22	Sinehan	Sugarcane	Pop	Warner Music Philippines	
22	Otomatika	Sam Concepcion	Pop	Universal Records	
22	This Time	Kylix	Pop	Universal Records	
22	Kumikinang	Angeline Quinto, Kritiko	Pop	Star Music	
22	Late Night Madness (Album)	Jeremy G	Pop	Star Music	
22	Night Time Prince	Kio Priest	Pop	Star Music	
22	Parangap	Fred Engay	Pop	Orieland	
22	Ikaw ang Mahal	JM Bales	Pop	Independent	
22	Liwanag (Para Sa'kin)	Sam Mangubat (feat. Kritiko)	Pop	Dreamzone	
22	Sad Songs and Bullshits (Part 1) (album)	Juan Karlos	Rock	Island Records Philippines (UMG Philippines)	
22	Trauma	The Juans	Pop rock	Viva Records	
22	Tama Na Ang Drama (2023 Deluxe Edition)	Ang Bandang Shirley	Pop rock	Wide Eyed Records Manila	
22	I Had You	Over October	Alternative rock	Underdog Music PH	
22	Ikaw Lang Patutunguhan	Amiel Sol	Alternative rock	Viva Records	
22	Ai Automatik	Cookie$	Hip hop/rap	The Bakeshop Studios	
22	Sange & Yasha	Sica	Hip hop/rap	Greenhouse Records	
22	Limutin Ang Problema	Paul Michael, Flict G	Hip hop/rap	FlipMusic	
22	Sana'y Patawarin Mo	Joshua Mari	Hip hop/rap	Independent	
22	Move in Miracles (Live At MOA Arena)	Victory Worship	Praise & Worship	Victory	
22	Karera	Bini	P-pop	Star Music	
22	Bakit Papa	Yara	P-pop	Sony Music Philippines	
25	Musika	G22	P-pop	Republic Records Philippines (UMG Philippines)	
28	Sandal	Vxon	P-pop	Republic Records Philippines (UMG Philippines)	
29	Delulu	Zack Tabudlo	Pop	Republic Records Philippines (UMG Philippines)	
29	Loves7age (Album)	DENȲ	Pop	WayBettr	
29	Dito Ba? (from A Very Good Girl)	Misha de Leon	Pop	Star Music	
29	Daisy (Album)	Unique	Pop	O/C Records	
29	Di Na Kita Mahal	Mitoy Yonting	Pop	Warner Music Philippines	
29	Sunday Morning	Paolo Sandejas, Ysanygo	Pop	Universal Records	
29	Sitwasyonship	Janine Berdin	Pop	Island Records Philippines (UMG Philippines)	
29	Unkind	Dom Guyot	Pop	Island Records Philippines (UMG Philippines)	
29	Damahan	Chen	Pop	Island Records Philippines (UMG Philippines)	
29	Patago	Matthaios	Hip hop/rap	Midas Records	
29	Trust Issues	Jr Crown	Hip hop/rap	Sony Music Philippines	
29	Inosentensya	Flict G (feat. Liriko)	Hip hop/rap	Sony Music Philippines	
29	Buang	Mayonnaise	Pop rock	Sony Music Philippines	
29	Dare You	Kiana Valenciano	R&B/soul	Independent	
29	Astronaut/Gumagalaw	Zo zo	R&B/soul	Viva Records	
29	Buti na Lang	Johnoy Danao	Alternative folk	Bacon and Shrimpie Records	
29	Be Mine	BGYO	P-pop	Star Music	
29	Babae	Masculados	Novelty	Universal Records	
29	Kulang	Better Days	Alternative rock	Universal Records	
30	Light Up	Yes My Love	P-pop	Republic Records Philippines (UMG Philippines)	

=== Fourth quarter ===
==== October ====
Date	Single / album	Artist(s)	Genre(s)	Label(s)	Ref.
1	Trauma	CK YG/Pricetagg	Hip hop/rap	Independent	
5	Watchumean	Hellmerry, Buddahbeads, Young GoD	Hip hop/rap	Young God Records	
5	F.U.I.L.Y.	Karencitta (feat. Pricetagg)	Hip hop/rap	Def Jam Philippines (UMG Philippines)	
5	Ayoko Na	Freaky Rap, MC Einstein	Hip hop/rap	Independent	
6	Nauupos	Fred Engay	Pop	Orieland	
6	Kaliwa"t Kanan	Hey Its Je	Pop	Independent	
6	Ulam	Miguel Odron	Pop	Independent	
6	Palangga	Berto	Pop	Fascination Records	
6	On My Way	Julian Trono	Pop	Viva Records	
6	Mahiwaga (EP)	Silent Sanctuary	Pop rock	Independent	
6	Bituin	Dear Dahlia	Pop rock	Universal Records	
6	Kahit Saan	Leona	Indie rock	Universal Records	
6	Ysanygo (EP)	Ysanygo	R&B/soul	Underdog Music PH	
6	Opo	Shehyee	Hip hop/rap	Independent	
6	Circles	8 Ballin'	Hip hop/rap	Def Jam Philippines (UMG Philippines)	
6	Hayaan	Yno	Alternative rock	Sony Music Philippines	
6	Huwebes	Kobe Silvestre	Rock	O/C Records	
6	Kanta Binisaya (Heritage Song of Eastern Visayas (Album)	UP Madrigal Singers	Choir	Independent	
8	Distorted	4th Impact	P-pop	Independent	
11	Turn Back Time	Zack Tabudlo (feat. Violette Wautier)	Pop	Republic Records Philippines (UMG Philippines)	
11	Your Universe	Arthur Miguel	Pop	Warner Music Philippines	
11	Maldita	Jarlo Base	Rock	Sony Music Philippines	
12	IDWTEXTUBABY	Kindred	Pop	Island Records Philippines (UMG Philippines)	
12	Sobrang Swabe	Luci J	Hip hop/rap	Luciddreams	
13	Delusional	Yden	Pop	Independent	
13	Lampara (EP)	Wilbert Ross	Pop	Viva Records	
13	I Want to Kiss You	Aly Remulla	Pop	O/C Records	
13	It Must Have Been Love	Regine Velasquez	Pop	Star Music	
13	Kay Ganda ng Ating Musika	Martin Nievera, Tony Laureta	Pop	Star Music	
13	Saglit Lang	Jen Cee	Pop	TMP Productions	
13	FourOneZeroThree	Calvin de Leon	Hip hop/rap	Independent	
13	HNGK	Mac Mafia	Hip hop/rap	Independent	
13	Owshi	Lo Ki	Hip hop/rap	Viva Records	
13	Malabo	Juan Caoile	Hip hop/rap	Viva Records	
13	Sa'yo Lamang	Lipip	Hip hop/rap	314 Studios	
13	Wag Kang Pa-Eu	Jr Crown	Hip hop/rap	Sawndass Music	
13	Happy Breakup Day	Cookie$, Jkey	Hip hop/rap	The Bakeshop Studios	
13	Maligayang Pagdating	Abaddon	Hip hop/rap	Sony Music Philippines	
13	Tulog Nang Tulog	Gracenote	Pop rock	Soupstar Music	
18	Chicosci (Album)	Chicosci	Pop rock	Tower of Doom Music	
18	Cobalt Blue	Any Name's Okay	Alternative rock	Sony Music Philippines	
18	Sa Panaginip	Shanni	Pop	Sony Music Philippines	
18	Jealous	Cliff, Reanne Borela	Indie pop	Warner Music Philippines	
20	Her	Kyle Juliano	Pop	Universal Records	
20	Can This Be Love	Nasser	Pop	Curve Entertainment	
20	Honest	Lucas Miguel	Pop	Underdog Music PH	
20	Sayong Sayo	Drei Raña	Pop	PolyEast Records	
20	Here's Your Perfect (Acoustic)	Nef Medina	Pop	Evolution Media	
20	Same Ground	Rangel	Pop	Warner Music Philippines	
20	Pull Up	Shanti Dope, Hellmerry	Hip hop/rap	Universal Records	
20	Kung Alam Mo Lang (Album)	Hev Abi	Hip hop/rap	Independent	
20	Forever Hiphop	1096 Gang, Omar Baliw	Hip hop/rap	Independent	
20	My Thang (Go Getta 2)	O Side Mafia	Hip hop/rap	Sony Music Philippines	
20	Tocino	Sean Al	Hip hop/rap	Warner Music Philippines	
20	Walang Duda	ALLMO$T, Crakky	Hip hop/rap	Viva Records	
20	Pagod	I Belong to the Zoo	Alternative rock	Independent	
20	Balyena	Pedicab	Alternative rock	Soupstar Music	
20	Ganid	Paham	Indie rock	Off the Record	
20	Dito	1st.One	P-pop	Warner Music Philippines	
22	Without You	OLG Zak, CK YG	Hip hop/rap	Independent	
25	Nasaan Ka Na Ba?	Jason Marvin	Pop	Sony Music Philippines	
25	Di Mo Lang Alam	MYMP	Pop	PolyEast Records	
25	Bulong	jikamarie	Pop	Warner Music Philippines	
25	Pasuyo	Atasha Muhlach	Pop	Vicor Music	
25	Roots	Armi Millare	Alternative rock	DaWorks Entertainment	
26	Binalewala	Hey Its Je	Pop	Independent	
26	Shining Star	Pluus	P-pop	Universal Records	
26	Youphobia	Chen	Alternative pop	Island Records Philippines (UMG Philippines)	
27	Dal'wang Patinig	SunKissed Lola	Pop	Independent	
27	Truth Serum	Zeke Abella	Pop	Independent	
27	Di Na Bale	$ho	Pop	Independent	
27	Waiting 4 U (delulu)	Shoti	Pop	Sony Music Philippines	
27	Around in the	Iluna	Pop	Evolution Media	
27	A.M.	Jayda	Pop	Republic Records Philippines (UMG Philippines)	
27	Kayang Kaya	Sam Benwick	Pop	Vicor Records	
27	Biyaheng Mahiwaga	The Bloomfields	Pop	Lilystars Records	
27	LF: You (777)	Kylix	Pop	Universal Records	
27	Palagi	Shanti Dope	Hip hop/rap	Universal Records	
27	Pilak (Album)	Gloc 9	Hip hop/rap	Universal Records	
27	Karanasan	Guddhist Gunatita	Hip hop/rap	Independent	
27	SLB	Teys	Hip hop/rap	Independent	
27	Kikik	Cookie$	Hip hop/rap	The Bakeshop Studios	
27	Inuman Na (Tagay 2)	J-King, Michael Libranda	Hip hop/rap	Evolution Media	
27	Fiesiesta	CLR	Hip hop/rap	Theatrisco	
27	B.A.D.	Denise Julia, P-lo	R&B/soul	Sony Music Philippines	
27	Para Sa Akin	Jason Dhakal	R&B/soul	Warner Music Philippines	
27	123	Over October	Alternative rock	Underdog Music PH	
27	Go To Hell	Lesha	Pop punk	Careless Music	
27	CK2	Y ara	Indie pop	Warner Music Philippines	
27	Ngayong Pasko	Aicelle Santos	Christmas	Jesuit Music Ministry	
28	Umaga	Gloc 9, Hero, Ramdiss	Hip hop/rap	Universal Records	
30	Señorita	JP Bacalan	Hip hop/rap	Rawstarr Records	
31	Praning	ALLMO$T	Hip hop/rap	Viva Records	

==== November ====
Date	Single / album	Artist(s)	Genre(s)	Label(s)	Ref.
1	RAW	Tu$ Brother$	Hip hop/rap	WayBettr	
1	Isang Salita	Michael Pacquiao	Hip hop/rap	Oblivion Paradise	
3	Malupet	Jeff Grecia	Pop	Independent	
3	Lisan	Joshua Mari	Pop	Independent	
3	Bakit Ako	Joseph John	Pop	BP Records	
3	Be With U	KD Estrada	Pop	Star Music	
3	Equilibrium	Misha de Leon	Pop	Star Music	
3	Peligro	Shane G	Pop	Sony Music Philippines	
3	Summer Madness	Shanti Dope, Buddhabeads, hellmerry	Hip hop/rap	Universal Records	
3	Sa Papel	Crick$ On, JEBeats, kyd LDN	Hip hop/rap	Plus 63 Records	
3	Galaxy	The Juans	Pop rock	Viva Records	
3	Asa	CLR	R&B/soul	Theartistco	
4	Ayos Lang 2	OLG Zak	Hip hop/rap	Independent	
7	Subset (Album)	Kindred	Pop	Island Records Philippines (UMG Philippines)	
8	Moving Closer	Felip	Pop	Warner Music Philippines	
8	Kasalanan	EMN'98	Pop	O/C Records	
8	Byahe	Raven	Pop	Sony Music Philippines	
8	Pasensya Ka Na	Jemay Santiago	Hip hop/rap	Sony Music Philippines	
8	Wicked Heart	Barbie Almalbis	Pop rock	Sony Music Philippines	
9	Curiosity Killed the Cat (Album)	Hey June!	Pop rock	Island Records Philippines (UMG Philippines)	
10	Victim	Zack Tabudlo	Pop	Republic Records Philippines (UMG Philippines)	
10	Something	Julie Anne San Jose	Pop	Universal Records	
10	Sandali	Jana Garcia	Pop	Universal Records	
10	Hinahanap-hanap	jikamarie	Pop	Warner Music Philippines	
10	Medyas	Joema Lauriano	Pop	Viva Records	
10	Alas Diyes	Angela Ken	Pop	Star Music	
10	Love Story Ko	Fana	Pop	Star Music	
10	Down Timez	Shanti Dope	Hip hop/rap	Universal Records	
10	Eroplanong Papel (Abot Tanaw)	Kiyo	Hip hop/rap	Believe Music	
10	Akin Ka	ALLMO$T	Hip hop/rap	Viva Records	
10	CC	Calvin de Leon	Hip hop/rap	Independent	
10	Maligayang Pasko	Juan Karlos	Christmas	Island Records Philippines (UMG Philippines)	
10	Pasko'y Nagbabalik	Janah Zaplan	Christmas	Star Music	
10	Simbahan ng Pag-ibig	LA and Ana Tubig	Christmas	Jesuit Music Ministry	
10	Lara	Leona	Indie rock	Universal Records	
10	Nagbabakasakali	Polaris	Indie rock	Dreamify Records	
10	Your Love	1st.One	P-pop	Warner Music Philippines	
10	Crush Crush	1621BC	Star Music		
11	11:11	Pappel	Alternative pop	O/C Records	
13	'Di Mo Sure	Blvck Purple	P-pop	Blvck Entertainment	
15	Tsinelas	Dilaw (feat. Asian Cutie)	Alternative rock	Warner Music Philippines	
15	Prinsesa	Zelijah	Hip hop/rap	Sony Music Philippines	
15	Di Ngayon	Zo zo, Samm	R&B/soul	Viva Records	
15	Pag-ibig Lang	Mark Bautista	Pop	Viva Records	
15	Kaba Kilig Kuryente	Acel	Pop	Sony Music Philippines	
17	3rd Time's A Charm (Album)	Zack Tabudlo	Pop	Republic Records Philippines (UMG Philippines)	
17	East Side	Lyn Lapid	Pop	Republic Records Philippines (UMG Philippines)	
17	Iingatan Kita	Jireh Lim (feat. Nik Makino)	Pop	Warner Music Philippines	
17	Yugto	Paul Pablo	Pop	Warner Music Philippines	
17	Kilala Ng Puso	Marianne Osabel	Pop	GMA Music	
17	Promise (Volume 1) (Album)	Jason Marvin	Pop	Sony Music Philippines	
17	Sweet Nothings (Chapter 1) (Album)	Denise Julia	R&B/soul	Sony Music Philippines	
17	'Wag Kang Bibitaw	Cean Jr.	R&B/soul	O/C Records	
17	'97 Jay-Z	Shanti Dope	Hip hop/rap	Universal Records	
17	Contra	CLR, Pricetagg	Hip hop/rap	Rawstarr Records	
17	Nasaan	Republikan	Hip hop/rap	Sony Music Philippines	
17	Sayong Sa'yo (Papel, Gunting, Bato)	Rico Blanco	Pop rock	Sony Music Philippines	
17	Please Lang	SOS	Alternative rock	Careless Music	
17	Can't Wait To See You on Christmas Day	Clara Benin	Christmas	Offmute	
17	TOTGA Nung Christmas	Eydie Waw	Christmas	Star Music	
17	Pantropiko	Bini	P-pop	Star Music	
17	Loka	G22	P-pop	Republic Records Philippines (UMG Philippines)	
17	Maligaya Ang Pasko	Pluus, YGIG	P-pop	Universal Records	
17	Make Me Better	Daydream	P-pop	Underdog Music PH	
17	Aking Hiling	Zephanie	Soundtrack	Walt Disney Records, UMG Philippines	
17	Miscom	Pinkmen	Rock	Offshore Music	
17	Set Me on Fire	Here+Now	Rock	Off the Record, Sony Music Philippines	
22	Salvaje Freestyle	Illest Morena	R&B/soul	Independent	
22	So Blue	Nicole Angela (feat. Josh Dutch)	R&B/soul	Warner Music Philippines	
22	Pahinga	CHNDTR	Pop rock	UMG Philippines	
22	Bakit Kung Liligaya Ka	Imelda Papin, Maffi Papin Carrion	Pop	Papin Entertainment	
24	Pangako	Moira Dela Torre	Pop	Star Music	
24	Biglaan	Donny Pangilinan	Pop	Star Music	
24	Isang Tingin Mo Lang	Noah Alejandre	Pop	Warner Music Philippines	
24	Set You Free	Sugarcane	Pop	Warner Music Philippines	
24	Sa'yo (Heto Na Naman)	Daniel Paringit	Pop	Island Records Philippines (UMG Philippines)	
24	Not the One	Elise Huang	Pop	Republic Records Philippines (UMG Philippines)	
24	Burara	Sam Mangubat	Pop	Dreamzone	
24	Paraiso	XOXO	Pop	Curve Entertainment	
24	Ang Nararamdaman	JinHo Bae	Pop	Sony Music Philippines	
24	Autumn	Ben&Ben	Alternative folk	Sony Music Philippines	
24	Magbabalik	Imago (feat. Ebe Dancel)	Pop rock	Universal Records	
24	Pakundangan	Demi (feat. Hev Abi)	Hip hop/rap	Sony Music Philippines	
24	PABLO	Waiian	Hip hop/rap	Sony Music Philippines	
24	Guns and Roses	Shanti Dope	Hip hop/rap	Universal Records	
24	OEM	Ramdiss	Hip hop/rap	Universal Records	
24	Nasayo	ALLMO$T	Hip hop/rap	Viva Records	
24	Ellie	Allison Shore (feat. Kiyo)	Hip hop/rap	Labyrinth Music	
24	Pahinga Ka Muna	J-King	Hip hop/rap	Evolution Media	
24	Brrr Months Money	Bugoy na Koykoy	Hip hop/rap	Independent	
24	Find Me	CLR	Hip hop/rap	Independent	
24	Ngayong Pasko	Shoti	Christmas	Sony Music Philippines	
24	Our Christmas Prayer	Erik Santos (feat. Mater Dei Music Ministry)	Christmas	Jesuit Music Ministry	
24	An Offshore Christmas Part 1 (album)	Various artists	Christmas	Offshore Music	
24	Bulalakaw	BGYO	P-pop	Star Music	
24	Laruan	1621BC	P-pop	Star Music	
24	IKAW (re-release)	Healy After Dark	Alternative rock	O/C Records	
24	Replacing Chef Chico (Original Soundtrack)	Leanne & Naara	Soundtrack	Warner Music Philippines	
24	Parang Kahapon	Ela Figura	Indie pop	Off the Record, Sony Music Philippines	
24	no heart	Lesha	Indie pop	Careless Music	
28	Selos	Shaira	Bangsamoro Pop/B-Pop	AHS Productions	
29	Someday	Playertwo	Hip hop/rap	Warner Music Philippines	
30	Lumayo Ka Na	Nateman	Hip hop/rap	HTRB Records	

==== December ====
Date	Single / album	Artist(s)	Genre(s)	Label(s)	Ref.
1	Sa'yong Sa'yo Na Ako	Rhodessa	Pop	Viva Records	
1	To Love In The 21st Century: The Epilogue	Lyn Lapid	Pop	Republic Records Philippines (UMG Philippines)	
1	Vanish Mode	SV Squad	Pop	Independent	
1	Pag Laya	Jen Cee	Pop	Independent	
1	Nahulog	Marion Aunor	Pop	Wild Dream Records	
1	Isa Lang	Lyca Gairanod	Pop	Vicor Music	
1	Merry Goodbye	Oh! Caraga	Visayan pop	O/C Records	
1	Tayo Na Lang Dalawa	Calein	Alternative rock	O/C Records	
1	Huwag Na Huwag Mong Sasabihin	Lola Amour	Alternative rock	Warner Music Philippines	
1	Di Ilaw Sa Gabing Mapanglaw (Album)	Dilaw	Indie rock	Warner Music Philippines	
1	Miss Kita Kung Christmas	Iluna	Christmas	Evolution Media	
1	Christmas Is Here (Nathan's Song)	Erik Santos (feat. Mater Dei Music Ministry)	Christmas	Jesuit Music Ministry	
1	Sana Masaya Ka	Nicole Asensio, Jeffrey Hidalgo, Solo Cal	Christmas	Warner Music Philippines	
1	Christmas Song (Version II)	Ena Mori	Christmas	Offshore Music	
1	Pasko Ang Pinaka Magandang Kuwento	Various artists	Christmas	Star Music	
1	CMD	Calvin de Leon	Hip hop/rap	Independent	
1	Solid Lang	1096 Gang	Hip hop/rap	Independent	
1	Dahilan	Hero	Hip hop/rap	Universal Records	
1	WEYAAT? (Album)	Waiian	Hip hop/rap	Sony Music Philippines	
1	Guiding Star	Jay R	R&B/soul	Homeworkz Entertainment	
2	Follow You	Sheki	R&B/soul	Superball	
2	Jonas (Kanta)	Jonas Dichoso	Pop	Independent	
4	Wag Ka Muna Umalis	Awie, Jaysen	Hip hop/rap	Independent	
7	Domino	Join the Club	Alternative rock	Independent	
8	Bawat Taon	Arthur Miguel	Pop	Warner Music Philippines	
8	Lito	jikamarie	Pop	Warner Music Philippines	
8	Miss Miss	Rob Deniel	Pop	Vicor Records	
8	Paksa	Chrstn	Pop	O/C Records	
8	Get It Poppin'	Pops Fernandez	Pop	Star Music	
8	Bling	Alex Bruce	Hip hop/rap	Sony Music Philippines	
8	Alfamart	Calvin de Leon	Hip hop/rap	Independent	
8	Nakakabulag	MC Einstein	Hip hop/rap	Independent	
8	Kahit Lagi Pa	ALLMO$T	Hip hop/rap	Viva Records	
8	Kamay	Zo Zo	Hip hop/rap	Viva Records	
8	Pasko Na Naman (Live Performance)	Bituin Escalante	Christmas	Sony Music Philippines	
8	Panalangin Kong Pasko	Ronnie Liang	Christmas	Universal Records	
8	An Offshore Christmas Part 2 (Album)	Various artists	Christmas	Offshore Music	
8	Maynila	Sound	Jazz	Warner Music Philippines	
9	Alam No Na This	Lo Ki	Hip hop/rap	Viva Records	
11	Baddie	Emcee Rhenn, CK YG, King Badger	Hip hop/rap	Independent	
11	Baka Sakali	Kxle	Hip hop/rap	Off Human	
12	All I Want For Christmas Is You	Kris Lawrence	Christmas	Homeworkz Entertainment	
15	Senaryo (Album)	Adie	Pop	O/C Records	
15	Kahit Habang Buhay	B.O.U.	Pop	Curve Entertainment	
15	Takas	SV Squad	Pop	SV Music	
15	Fall For You Again	Shell Tenedero	Pop	Cheerful Music	
15	Patuloy	Lance Santdas	Pop	Independent	
15	Pipiliin	Carl Beley	Pop	Independent	
15	Get Right	Josh Cullen	Pop	Sony Music Philippines	
15	Awit10 (Album)	Troy Laureta	Pop	Star Music	
15	In My Arms Where I'll Keep You	December Avenue	Alternative rock	Tower of Doom	
15	Sakit Mo Na	CK YG	Hip hop/rap	Independent	
15	Medisina	Jrldm	Hip hop/rap	Music Colony Philippines	
15	Break My Heart Again	Purple N' Oranges	R&B/soul	Independent	
15	EXmas (Oh Kay Lamig)	Jana Garcia	Christmas	Universal Records	
15	Christmas Peace of Mind	Amiel Aban	Christmas	Warner Music Philippines	
16	Crooner Carols	Richard Poon	Ballad	Republic Records Philippines (UMG Philippines)	
16	Palag	Omar Baliw	Rock	Independent	
18	Meron Na (Album)	Loonie	Hip hop/rap	Independent	
18	Sayang Friend	Ambo Dolores	Rock	Independent	
20	Yaman	Jason Marvin	Pop	Sony Music Philippines	
20	Almighty (EP)	King Promdi	Hip hop/rap	Toxic Lifestyle Ent.	
21	Hiwaga	Chen	Pop	Island Records Philippines (UMG Philippines)	
22	Kanako	Felip	Pop	Warner Music Philippines	
22	Kaibigan, Pasko Na	Fred Engay	Pop	Orieland	
22	Get Low	O Side Mafia	Hip hop/rap	Sony Music Philippines	
22	Girls Need Love	Illest Morena	Hip hop/rap	Independent	
22	Blueprint (EP)	Guddhist Gunatita	Hip hop/rap	Independent	
26	Araw-Araw w/ You	Hey Its Je	Pop	Independent	
28	LAGING IKAW	Krisostomo	R&B/soul	Viva Records	
29	Never Close Enough	Kristel Fulgar	Singer/songwriter	Independent	
29	Swabe	Kyle Zagado	Hip hop/rap	Campus Music Records	
29	Tanghalin	Joshua Mari	R&B/soul	Independent	

== Notable shows ==
Most of the shows this year were supposed to be held in 2020, but were postponed due to the COVID-19 pandemic.

=== Local artists ===
Date(s)	Headliner(s)	Venue	City	Event / Tour	Note(s)	Ref(s)
January 7	Reese Lansangan	123 Block, Mandala Park	Mandaluyong	Hello Again Goodbye	With special guests Josh Villena, bird., and I Belong to the Zoo	
January 20	Toni Gonzaga	Araneta Coliseum	Quezon	I Am Toni	With special guests Alex Gonzaga and Andrew E.	
January 20	The Itchyworms, Rocksteddy	Newport Performing Arts Center	Pasay	MUSIKO: Timeless Pinoy Bands	—N/a	
January 21	South Border, Neocolours	Newport Performing Arts Center	Pasay	MUSIKO: Timeless Pinoy Bands	—N/a	
January 21	Darren Espanto, Janine Tenoso, Shanti Dope, Ace Banzuelo, Jason Dhakal	Lucky Chinatown	Manila	Countdown to Chinese New Year 2023	Hosted by Nicole Cordoves and Louie Ngo	
January 28	Christian Bautista	Samsung Performing Arts Center, Circuit Makati	Makati	The Way You Look at Me: Christian Bautista's 20th Anniversary Concert	With special guests Julie Anne San Jose and the Manila Symphony Orchestra	
January 28	Ebe Dancel and Mitch Singson of Sugarfree	123 Block, Mandala Park	Mandaluyong	SA WAKAS: 20th Anniversary Celebration	With special guests The Itchyworms, Johnoy Danao, Cheats, and Autotelic	
February 3	Moira Dela Torre	Araneta Coliseum	Quezon	Moira Live Concert	—N/a	
February 3–4	Christopher de Leon, Edgar Mortiz, Tirso Cruz III	Newport Performing Arts Center	Pasay	Some Kind of Valentine	With special guest Lovi Poe	
February 4	The Ransom Collective	123 Block, Mandala Park	Mandaluyong	Hello Again: The Ransom Collective Reunion Show	With special guests Cheats, Syd Hartha, and Gabba	
February 4–5	Louie Ocampo	The Theatre, Solaire Resort & Casino	Parañaque	Composer Ka Lang: 45th Anniversary Concert	With special guests Martin Nievera, Zsa Zsa Padilla, Basil Valdez, Katrina Velarde, Janine Teñoso, Lyca Gairanod, Sarah Geronimo, and Sharon Cuneta	
February 7	Adie, Andrea Brillantes, Mayonnaise	Araneta Coliseum	Quezon	#PINAKAMAKINANG: The Brilliant Concert 2023	—N/a	
February 10	Brigiding, Precious Paula Nicole, Viñas DeLuxe	New Frontier Theater	Quezon	Divine Divas Live	—N/a	
February 10	Catriona Gray, Sam Milby	Newport Performing Arts Center	Pasay	Love and Beyond	—N/a	
February 11	Kyla, Richard Poon, Sitti	Newport Performing Arts Center	Pasay	The Music of Love	—N/a	
February 14	Jim Paredes, Boboy Garovillo, Raymond Lauchengco, Roselle Nava, Ito Rapadas, Wency Cornejo	Plenary Hall — Philippine International Convention Center	Pasay	All Heart	—N/a	
February 14–15	Gary Valenciano	Newport Performing Arts Center	Pasay	Gary V. Reenergized Manila	With special guests Yeng Constantino and Kiana Valenciano	
February 14–15	Louie Ocampo	The Theatre, Solaire Resort & Casino	Parañaque	Composer Ka Lang: The Valentine Concert	Featuring Sam Concepcion, Lyca Gairanod, Janine Teñoso, Apo Hiking Society, Marco Sison & Mark Bautista, With Special Performances by Pops Fernandez, Martin Nievera, and Joey Albert	
February 15	CrazyMix, JRoa, King Badger, Sisa, Smugglaz	Music Museum	San Juan	BLVCK Valentine	With special guests Raf Davis, Unicorn, and BLVCK Flowers	
February 17–18	Regine Velasquez	Samsung Performing Arts Theater, Circuit Makati	Makati	Solo	—N/a	
February 18	Gigi de Lana	The Theatre, Solaire Resort & Casino	Parañaque	G Rules	—N/a	
February 18	Ice Seguerra	Waterfront Hotel & Casino	Cebu	Becoming Ice	—N/a	
February 24–25	Regine Velasquez	Samsung Performing Arts Theater, Circuit Makati	Makati	Solo	—N/a	
February 27	December Avenue, Rivermaya, Sponge Cola, The Itchyworms	Araneta Coliseum	Quezon	#Rosmarmaspinalakas: First Anniversary Concert	—N/a	
March 3	December Avenue, Parokya ni Edgar, Rouge	Amoranto Sports Complex	Quezon	Para Sa'Yo: A Benefit Concert	A fundraising concert for Parokya ni Edgar's former guitarist Gab Chee Kee, who was diagnosed with lymphoma.	
March 3	Freestyle, Side A	Newport Performing Arts Center	Pasay	Musiko: Timeless Pinoy Bands	—N/a	
March 4	Aegis	Newport Performing Arts Center	Pasay	Aegis Unlimited	—N/a	
March 4	Rivermaya, The Itchyworms, Kamikazee, 6cyclemind, Gracenote, Ebe Dancel	123 Block, Mandala Park	Mandaluyong	Resbak Para Kay Gab	—N/a	
March 10	6cyclemind, Mayonnaise	Newport Performing Arts Center	Pasay	MUSIKO: Timeless Pinoy Bands	—N/a	
March 11	Barbie Almalbis	123 Block, Mandala Park	Mandaluyong	Firewoman: 25 Years of Barbie Almalbis	With special guests Sandwich, Gabby Alipe, Clara Benin, I Belong to the Zoo, Kai Del Rio, and bird.; also featuring a reunion with Barbie's former bands Hungry Young Poets and Barbie's Cradle	
March 17	KZ Tandingan, Leanne & Naara, Nobita, Nameless Kids, Ron Poe, Katsy Lee, Sky Dominique	The Island — The Palace, Uptown Bonifacio	Taguig	Jameson St. Patrick's Day 2023	—N/a	
March 18	Carousel Casualties, Project Romeo, Mark Thompson, Eva Smalls, DZ SVG	Poblacion	Makati	Jameson St. Patrick's Day 2023	—N/a	
March 31	Ebe Dancel and Mitch Singson of Sugarfree	123 Block, Mandala Park	Mandaluyong	SA WAKAS: 20th Anniversary Celebration — The Repeat	With special guests Sandwich and Red Ollero	
April 15	Gigi de Lana	Winford Hotel	Manila	Gigi De Lana and The GG Vibes Live Concert	—N/a	
April 15	Jeremiah Tiangco	Music Museum	San Juan	Dare to be Different	With special guests Christian Bautista, Ken Chan, Garrett Bolden, Jessica Villarubin, Mariane Osabel, Vilmark Viray, This Band, Magnus Haven, The Viktor Project, and Rob Deniel	
April 22	Isabella Gonzales, Kuh Ledesma, Mitch Valdes, Nanette Inventor	Hacienda Isabela	Indang	TBA	—N/a	
April 22	Hori7on	New Frontier Theater	Quezon	Hundred Days Miracle: Hori7on First Fanmeet	—N/a	
April 28	Ice Seguerra	SMX Convention Center, SM Lanang	Davao	Becoming Ice	—N/a	
April 28–29	Regine Velasquez	Samsung Performing Arts Theater, Circuit Makati	Makati	Solo	—N/a	
April 29	Billy Crawford, Sarah Geronimo, Saweetie	Araneta Coliseum	Quezon	2023 FIBA Basketball World Cup Draw	—N/a	
April	Full House Theater Company	Newport Performing Arts Center	Pasay	Ang Huling El Bimbo	—N/a	
May 1	Moira Dela Torre	Waterfront Hotel & Casino	Cebu	Braver: Moira Live @ Cebu	With special guests Ice Seguerra and I Belong to the Zoo	
May 3	Dulce, Rey Valera, APO Hiking Society, Marco Sison	The Theatre, Solaire Resort & Casino	Parañaque	The Class of OPM	—N/a	
May 6	Various artists	Metropolitan Theater	Manila	Ang Larawan: The Concert	—N/a	
May 7	Rey Valera, Marco Sison, Pops Fernandez, Nonoy Zuñiga, Hajji Alejandro	Enchanting Events Place	Santa Rosa	The Four Kings and Queen	—N/a	
May 11	Martin Nievera	Samsung Performing Arts Center, Circuit Makati	Makati	The Journey Continues	—N/a	
May 12	Sarah Geronimo	Araneta Coliseum	Quezon	SG20: Sarah Geronimo's 20th Anniversary Concert	—N/a	
May 12	Mocha Girls	Music Museum	San Juan	Old Fantasy: Mocha Girls Reunion Concert	—N/a	
May 16	Ely Buendia, Gary Valenciano, December Avenue, El Gamma Penumbra, Parokya ni Edgar, Zack Tabudlo	Mall of Asia Arena	Pasay	Roar As One	—N/a	
May 20	Mayonnaise	Quezon Memorial Circle	Quezon	MAYO20: The Finale	Final show of Mayonnaise's 20th anniversary concert/gig tour series	
May 31	Jim Paredes, Boboy Garovillo, Mike Hanopol, Sampaguita, Joey Abando, Male Rigor, Monet Gaskell, Mon Esia, Pete Gatela, Carlos Parsons, Yujin Baydal, Nonoy Tan, Magtoto	The Theatre, Solaire Resort & Casino	Parañaque	Tugtugan Sitenta	—N/a	
June 1	Side A	Newport Performing Arts Center	Pasay	Side A: Then and Now	—N/a	
June 2	Vice Ganda	Araneta Coliseum	Quezon	Your Majesty, Queen VG	—N/a	
June 3	JR de Guzman	The Theatre, Solaire Resort & Casino	Parañaque	Later that Evening	—N/a	
June 3	Adie, Dionela, Mrld, SunKissed Lola, The Juans	Skydome – SM City North EDSA	Quezon	Press Play Sessions	—N/a	
June 9	Joey G, Ice Seguerra, Jinky Vidal, Wency Cornejo, Juris Fernandez, Ito Rapadas	Araneta Coliseum	Quezon	Playlist 2	—N/a	
June 9	bird, Chicosci, Dilaw, Faspitch, Feel the Mighty, Fragments, Jaggernaut, Kamikazee, Moonstar88, Tricia, Urbandub	123 Block, Mandala Park	Mandaluyong	Roadkill	—N/a	
June 24–25	SB19	Araneta Coliseum	Quezon	Pagtatag: World Tour — Manila	—N/a	
July 7	Sarah Geronimo, Bamboo	Araneta Coliseum	Quezon	Sarah G X Bamboo	—N/a	
July 8	The Juans	Waterfront Hotel & Casino	Cebu	The Juans Live in Cebu	Originally scheduled for May 27, but was postponed due to Typhoon Mawar.	
July 8	Sheryn Regis	Music Museum	San Juan	All Out: The 20th Anniversary Concert	—N/a	
July 14	Regine Velasquez, Alice Reyes Dance Philippines, Philippine Madrigal Singers, Manila Philharmonic Orchestra, Steps Dance Studio, Menchu Lauchengco-Yulo, Markki Stroem, Poppert Bernadas, Lara Maigue, Shaira Opsimar, Ryan Cayabyab	Samsung Performing Arts Theater, Circuit Makati	Makati	Open Doors: The Annual Anniversary Fundraising Concert	—N/a	
July 14–16	Various P-pop artists	Araneta Coliseum	Quezon	2023 PPOPCON	Originally scheduled on March 18–19, but postponed due to logistical issues.	
July 22	Belle Mariano	New Frontier Theater	Quezon	Beloved	—N/a	
May–June	Eraserheads	Various locations in the United States and Canada		Huling El Bimbo 2023 World Tour	—N/a	
July–August	SB19	Various locations in the United States and Canada		Pagtatag: World Tour	—N/a	
August 4, 12, 19 and 26	Gary Valenciano	Music Museum	San Juan	Gary V: Back at the Museum	—N/a	
August 4	K Brosas, Rey Valera	Newport Performing Arts Center	Pasay	K! Valera	—N/a	
August 5	Ebe Dancel	Waterfront Hotel & Casino	Cebu	Ebe Dancel Live in Cebu	—N/a	
August 6	Sarah Geronimo, Ely Buendia, Sandara Park, Donny Pangilinan, Belle Mariano, Ben&Ben, Sponge Cola, Mayonnaise, December Avenue, Zack Tabudlo, SunKissed Lola	Mall of Asia Arena	Pasay	Acer Day Concert 2023	—N/a	
August 12	Angela Ken, Annrain, Bryan Chong, Cesca, Drei Sugay, Erik Santos, Fana, Ice Seguerra, Jarea, Jelrey, Jeremy G, JM Yosures, Lyka Estrella, Maki, Markus, Misha de Leon, Reiven Umali, Trisha Denise, Vicoree, Zion Aguirre	Metropolitan Theater	Manila	Tara Tena sa Met	—N/a	
September 1	Odette Quesada	Newport Performing Arts Theater	Pasay	Odette Quesada: All Hits – The 40th Anniversary Celebration	—N/a	
September 2	Kyla, Jay R	New Frontier Theater	Quezon	Back in Time	—N/a	
September 9	Hori7on	Araneta Coliseum	Quezon	Friend-SHIP: Voyage to Manila	—N/a	
September 15	Various artists (including Leah Navarro, Mike Hanopol, Sampaguita, and Marco Sison)	Newport Performing Arts Center	Pasay	Tugtugan Sitenta 2	—N/a	
September 15	RJ Jimenez	Teatrino Promenade	San Juan	RJ Jimenez: Now	—N/a	
September 22	Clara Benin	Music Museum	San Juan	Befriending My Tears	—N/a	
September 22	Sarah Geronimo, Bamboo	SMX Convention Center, SM Lanang	Davao	Sarah G X Bamboo: Philippine Tour	—N/a	
September 23	Sarah Geronimo, Bamboo	Santa Rosa Sports Complex	Santa Rosa	Sarah G X Bamboo: Philippine Tour	—N/a	
September 23	KZ Tandingan	Newport Performing Arts Theater	Pasay	KZ Experience	—N/a	
September 29	Juris Fernandez, Nyoy Volante	Music Museum	San Juan	Soundtrip Sessions Vol. 2	—N/a	
October 6	Erik Santos	Mall of Asia Arena	Pasay	MilEStone: 20th Anniversary Concert	—N/a	
October 13	Sarah Geronimo, Bamboo	IC3 Convention Center	Cebu	Sarah G X Bamboo: Philippine Tour	—N/a	
October 20	Piolo Pascual	Newport Performing Arts Theater	Pasay	An Ultimate Night with Piolo	—N/a	
October 27	Sharon Cuneta, Gabby Concepcion	Mall of Asia Arena	Pasay	Dear Heart	—N/a	
October 31	KZ Tandingan, Morissette	Araneta Coliseum	Quezon	Flormar Live: Morisette/KZ	—N/a	
November 5	Joey Generoso	New Frontier Theater	Quezon	Joey G.: Side Ko Lang	—N/a	
November 8	Nina	Samsung Hall – SM Aura Premier	Taguig	Only Nina	—N/a	
November 11	Ryan Cayabyab	Newport Performing Arts Theater	Pasay	Tribute to OPM	With special guests Basil Valdez, Zsa Zsa Padilla, Jona and Ryan Cayabyab Singers	
November 11	Poppert Bernadas	Music Museum	San Juan	Who Put the Pop on Poppert	—N/a	
November 17	Sharon Cuneta, Gabby Concepcion	Nustar Resort and Casino	Cebu	Dear Heart	—N/a	
November 17	Apo Hiking Society	Newport Performing Arts Theater	Pasay	The 50th Anniversary Concert	—N/a	
November 18	Masculados	Teatrino Promenade	San Juan	Masculados 20th Anniversary Concert	—N/a	
November 18	Gigi de Lana, Mitoy Yonting	Newport Performing Arts Theater	Pasay	Vibe and Drive	—N/a	
November 25	Kuh Ledesma	Music Museum	San Juan	I Love OPM	—N/a	
November 25	Comedy Manila	New Frontier Theater	Quezon	The Best of Comedy Manila	—N/a	
November 25	Regine Velasquez	Mall of Asia Arena	Pasay	Regine Rocks	—N/a	
December 1	Alamat	New Frontier Theater	Quezon	Dagundong: Alamat First Solo Concert	—N/a	
December 6	Ryan Cayabyab and Ryan Cayabyab Singers	Music Museum	San Juan	C is for Christmas	—N/a	
December 9	Jose Mari Chan and The Company	Newport Performing Arts Theater	Pasay	Going Home to Christmas	—N/a	
December 13	ABS-CBN Artists	Araneta Coliseum	Quezon	Forever Grateful: ABS-CBN Christmas Special 2023	First special to admit a physical live audience and held at the Araneta Coliseum since the COVID-19 pandemic in the Philippines.	
December 15	Teeth	Skydome – SM City North EDSA	Quezon	Play4Serve: Teeth 30th Anniversary Concert	Postponed. Also featuring Sandwich, Imago, Pedicab, Party Pace, Spacedog Spacecat, and The Diegos.	
December 19	Kaia	Teatrino Promenade	San Juan	Kaia First Solo Concert	—N/a	
December 20	1st.One	Teatrino Promenade	San Juan	Verse1 Year-end Concert	—N/a	
December 20	Aegis	The Theatre, Solaire Resort & Casino	Parañaque	The Christmas Bonus Concert	—N/a	
December 22	Richard Poon	Newport Performing Arts Theater	Pasay	Christmas with Richard Poon And His 16-Piece Big Band	—N/a	
December 30	Gigi De Lana and the Gigi Vibes, Mayonnaise, Arthur Miguel, Bassilyo, Jikamarie, Rangel, Mauie Francisco	Marikina Sports Center	Marikina	Marikina Year-End Concert 2023	—N/a	
December 31	Sharon Cuneta, Ogie Alcasid	Newport Performing Arts Theater	Pasay	The Grand Countdown to 2024	Also featuring Jona, Arthur Nery and Katrina Velarde. Hosted by Billy Crawford.	
December 31	Various artists from GMA	SM Mall of Asia	Pasay	Kapuso Countdown To 2024: The GMA New Year Countdown	Also televised on GMA Network.	
December 31	Mayonnaise, Gloc-9, Lola Amour, Dilaw	Philippine Arena	Bocaue	Philippine Arena 2024 Countdown	—N/a	
December 31	Piolo Pascual, Moira Dela Torre, K Brosas, VXON, Okada Manila Entertainment Group, Blast	Grand Ballroom, Okada Manila	Parañaque	2024 Ready for More – Okada Manila New Year's Eve Countdown	—N/a	
December 31	Erik Santos, Kyla, Press Hit Play, Okada Manila Entertainment Group	Fountain Foyer, Okada Manila	Parañaque	2024 Ready for More – Okada Manila New Year's Eve Countdown	—N/a	
December 31	Regine Velasquez, Sponge Cola, Al James, SB19, Philippines' Leading Musical Theatre Artists (featuring Gab Pangilinan and Myke Salomon), DJ Brian Cua, DJ Mike Lavet	Ayala Triangle	Makati	Nostalgia Meets The Future – 2024 New Year Countdown	Hosted by Ai Dela Cruz and Baus Rufo. This marks the return of Ayala Makati's New Year's Eve event for the first time since 2000.	
December 31	Sandwich, DJ Loonyo, Motherbasss, MC Pao Avila, DJ Alondra, DJ Jet Boado	Bridgetowne Concert Grounds	Pasig	Light the Towne	Hosted by KaladKaren and Princess Legaspi.	
December 31	Various DJs (including Ace Ramos, Mars Miranda, Kat DJ, Marc Marasigan, Marc Naval, Martin Pulgar)	The Palace, Uptown Bonifacio	Taguig	New Year's Eve at the Palace	—N/a	
December 31	Vice Ganda, Mayonnaise, The Dawn, Cueshé, Imago, Orange and Lemons, Shamrock, Autotelic, Tropical Depression, Bassilyo, Precious Paula Nicole, Captivating Katkat, Arizona Brandy, Bernie, Allan K., Boobay & Tekla, Tuesday Vargas, Uma, KDolls, Buganda, DN Powerdance	Quezon Memorial Circle	Quezon	QC Countdown to 2024	—N/a	
December 31	Morissette, KD Estrada, Alexa Ilacad, SunKissed Lola, Armi Millare, 1st.One, PlayerTwo, Silent Sanctuary	Eastwood City	Quezon	Eastwood City New Year Countdown to 2024	Hosted by Janeena Chan and Mikee Reyes.	

=== International artists ===
Date(s)	Headliner(s)	Venue	City	Event / Tour	Note(s)	Ref(s)
January 6–7	Various casts	The Theatre, Solaire Resort & Casino	Parañaque	Disney in Concert: A Magical Celebration	—N/a	
January 11	Quino of Big Mountain	Mactan Newtown Open Grounds	Lapu-Lapu	Reggae by the Beach Sinulog with Quino of Big Mountain	—N/a	
January 14	The Rose	The Theatre, Solaire Resort & Casino	Parañaque	Disney in Concert: A Magical Celebration	—N/a	
January 14–15	Itzy	Mall of Asia Arena	Pasay	Checkmate World Tour	—N/a	
January 17	Kim Soo-hyun	Araneta Coliseum	Quezon	The Nothing Like Dunkin' Fan Meet	—N/a	
January 20	Stray Kids	Araneta Coliseum	Quezon	Stay With Bench (Stray Kids Fan Meet)	—N/a	
January 21	Ohm Pawat, Nanon Korapat	Samsung Hall – SM Aura Premier	Taguig	Ohm-Nanon 1st Fan Meeting in Manila	—N/a	
January 22	Kim Seon-ho	Mall of Asia Arena	Pasay	One, Two, Three, Smile! 2023 Kim Seon-ho Asia Tour	—N/a	
January 23	Ne-Yo	Araneta Coliseum	Quezon	Ne-Yo Live in Concert	Held two shows on the same date	
January 26	No Pressure, Regulate	Metrotent Convention Center	Pasig	Asia Tour	—N/a	
January 28	Choi Min-ho	Mall of Asia Arena	Pasay	2023 Best: Choi Minho Lucky Choi's in Manila	—N/a	
February 3–5	Enhypen	Mall of Asia Arena	Pasay	Manifesto	—N/a	
February 6–7	Young Tak	—N/a	—N/a	—N/a	Promo appearances only	
February 11	Boyce Avenue	Araneta Coliseum	Quezon	Boyce Avenue	With special guests Adie, Nobita, and The Juans (Manila only).	
February 12	Boyce Avenue	Waterfront Hotel & Casino	Cebu	Boyce Avenue	With special guests Adie, Nobita, and The Juans (Manila only).	
February 12	Mamamoo	Araneta Coliseum	Quezon	Mamamoo World Tour "My Con"	—N/a	
February 14	Boyce Avenue	SMX Convention Center – SM Lanang Premier	Davao	Boyce Avenue	—N/a	
February 14	Rex Smith	SMX Convention Center Manila	Pasay	Let's Make A Memory With Rex Smith	—N/a	
February 15	Rex Smith	SMX Convention Center – SM City Clark	Angeles	Let's Make A Memory With Rex Smith	—N/a	
February 15	Wallows	New Frontier Theater	Quezon	Tell Me That It's Over Tour	—N/a	
February 17	Rex Smith	SMX Convention Center – SM Seaside City Cebu	Cebu	Let's Make A Memory With Rex Smith	—N/a	
February 17	The Vamps	Mall of Asia Arena	Pasay	Greatest Hits World Tour	—N/a	
February 18	Conan Gray	Mall of Asia Arena	Pasay	Superache Tour	—N/a	
February 18	Ruel	Venice Grand Canal	Taguig	Ruel Live in Manila	—N/a	
February 20	Backstreet Boys	Mall of Asia Arena	Pasay	DNA World Tour	—N/a	
February 20–21	Westlife	Araneta Coliseum	Quezon	The Wild Dreams Tour	—N/a	
February 23	OneRepublic	Araneta Coliseum	Quezon	OneRepublic Live in Concert	With special guest Jessia	
February 28	Jinyoung	New Frontier Theater	Quezon	Jinyoung Fan Meet	—N/a	
March 3	Lee Je-hoon	New Frontier Theater	Quezon	Vacation: Lee Je-hoon Fan Meet in Manila	—N/a	
March 5	Song Kang	Araneta Coliseum	Quezon	Song Kang Fan Meet	—N/a	
March 5	B.I	Philippine International Convention Center	Pasay	B.I 2023 Asia Tour: [L.O.L The Hidden Stage]	With special guest James Reid	
March 6	Arctic Monkeys	Filinvest City Event Grounds	Muntinlupa	The Car Tour	—N/a	
March 7–26	Broadway International Group	Samsung Performing Arts Theater, Circuit Makati	Makati	The Sound of Music	Starring Karylle and Markki Stroem	
March 10	Simple Plan	New Frontier Theater	Quezon	The Harder Than It Looks Tour	With special guest AIRYEL	
March 11	Lee Jae-wook	New Frontier Theater	Quezon	Asia Tour Fan Meeting in Manila	—N/a	
March 11–12	Stray Kids	Mall of Asia Arena	Pasay	Maniac World Tour	—N/a	
March 12	Simple Plan	SMX Convention Center – SM Lanang Premier	Davao	The Harder Than It Looks Tour	with Special Guest AIRYEL	
March 12	Mark Prin, Kimberley Anne Woltemas	Skydome – SM City North EDSA	Quezon	Reel to Real: First Fanmeeting	—N/a	
March 14	Harry Styles	Philippine Arena	Bocaue	Love On Tour	—N/a	
March 15	Bryan Adams	Araneta Coliseum	Quezon	So Happy It Hurts Tour	—N/a	
March 17	Quino of Big Mountain, Selah Dub Warriors	Newport Performing Arts Theater	Pasay	TBA	—N/a	
March 17–18	Sting	The Theatre, Solaire Resort & Casino	Parañaque	My Songs Tour	—N/a	
March 21–26	David Foster	The Theatre, Solaire Resort & Casino	Parañaque	David Foster and Friends Live	With special guests Katharine McPhee, Daniel Emmet, Pia Toscano, Martin Nievera, and Morissette (except March 23, 25 and 26)	
March 23	Kim Woo-jin	New Frontier Theater	Quezon	Kim Woojin 1st World Tour 2023: Still Dream	—N/a	
March 24	Maisie Peters	U.P. Town Center	Quezon	Maisie Peters in Manila	—N/a	
March 25	Maisie Peters	Fully Booked – The Studio, Bonifacio High Street	Taguig	Maisie Peters in Manila	—N/a	
March 25	Moonbin & Sanha	New Frontier Theater	Quezon	Fan Con Tour: Diffusion in Manila	—N/a	
March 25	Kenny G	SMX Convention Center – SM Seaside City Cebu	Cebu	Kenny G Live in Cebu	—N/a	
March 25–26	Blackpink	Philippine Arena	Bocaue	Born Pink World Tour	—N/a	
March 26	WayV	Araneta Coliseum	Quezon	WayV Fanmeeting Tour [Phantom] In Manila	—N/a	
March 26	Movements	New Frontier Theater	Quezon	Movements Asia Tour	—N/a	
March 26	Saosin	Skydome – SM City North EDSA	Quezon	Saosin Live	—N/a	
March 29	Nightwish	Skydome – SM City North EDSA	Quezon	Nightwish Live	—N/a	
March 29	Kenny G	TBA	TBA	Kenny G Live in Manila	—N/a	
March 30 – April 1	Various casts	The Theatre, Solaire Resort & Casino	Parañaque	Disney in Concert: Live Your Dream	Featuring the Manila Philharmonic Orchestra	
March 31	Jim Gaffigan	Music Museum	San Juan	Jim Gaffigan: Dark Pale	—N/a	
April 1	Cast of Running Man	Mall of Asia Arena	Pasay	Running Man: A Decade of Laughter	—N/a	
April 11	Various K-pop artists	Araneta Coliseum	Quezon	K-Verse: The Ultimate Pop Universe	—N/a	
April 14	Kim Min-kyu	New Frontier Theater	Quezon	Heavenly Moment: 1st Fanmeet in Manila	—N/a	
April 15	Treasure	Mall of Asia Arena	Pasay	Treasure Tour Hello	—N/a	
April 16	Lee Jong-suk	Philippine International Convention Center	Pasay	Lee Jong-suk Fanmeet in Manila	—N/a	
April 21	Phum Viphurit	Glorietta	Makati	The Greng Jai Piece Asia & Oceania Tour	—N/a	
April 21	Freen Sarocha, Becky Armstrong	Waterfront Hotel & Casino	Cebu	FreenBecky Fabulous Fan Boom	—N/a	
April 22	Phum Viphurit	Ayala Malls Manila Bay	Parañaque	The Greng Jai Piece Asia & Oceania Tour	With Lola Amour as the opening act	
April 23	Phum Viphurit	Market! Market!	Taguig	The Greng Jai Piece Asia & Oceania Tour	—N/a	
April 23	Freen Sarocha, Becky Armstrong	New Frontier Theater	Quezon	FreenBecky Fabulous Fan Boom	—N/a	
April 26	Deniece Williams, J Michaels	The Theatre, Solaire Resort & Casino	Parañaque	Love Rocks	With Hajji Alejandro	
April 28	Kim Hyun-joong	Metrotent	Pasig	The End of the Dream	—N/a	
April 29	Boyzlife, Blue	Circuit Makati	Makati	Blue and Boyzlife	Originally scheduled on February 11, but moved to April 29 due to travel and logistical issues.	
April 29–30	NCT Dream	Mall of Asia Arena	Pasay	The Dream Show 2	Chenle did not join due to health concerns.	
May 3	PH-1	Filinvest Tent	Muntinlupa	Karpos Live: PH-1 in Manila	Part of the Karpos Live concert series by Karpos Multimedia	
May 3–4	The 1975	Mall of Asia Arena	Pasay	At Their Very Best	with Special Guest Wallice.	
May 4	Dream Theater	New Frontier Theater	Quezon	Top of the World Tour	Originally planned to be held at the nearby Araneta Coliseum, but moved to New Frontier Theater for unknown reasons.	
May 7	Bad Manners	Metrowalk Convention Center	Pasig	Viva La Ska Revolution Manila Leg 2023	—N/a	
May 7	Red Velvet	Mall of Asia Arena	Pasay	R to V	Joy did not join due to health concerns.	
May 7	Cian Ducrot	Venice Grand Canal	Taguig	Cian Ducrot Live in Manila	—N/a	
May 10	Honne	Araneta Coliseum	Quezon	Honne May 2023 Asia Tour	With special guest Beka	
May 12	Honne	University of Southern Philippines	Davao	Honne May 2023 Asia Tour	With special guest Beka	
May 14	Honne	Waterfront Hotel & Casino	Cebu	Honne May 2023 Asia Tour	With special guest Beka	
May 20	Exo-SC	Araneta Coliseum	Quezon	Back-to-Back Fan Tour in Manila	—N/a	
May 21	Wi Ha-joon	New Frontier Theater	Quezon	Gameplay with Wi Ha-jun: The Fan Meet	—N/a	
May 22	Matt Maltese	Samsung Hall – SM Aura Premier	Taguig	Matt Maltese Live in Manila	with Special Guest ANDREAH.	
May 26	Ruel	Samsung Hall – SM Aura Premier	Taguig	4th Wall: World Tour	—N/a	
May 27	Lee Seung-gi	New Frontier Theater	Quezon	The Dreamers Dream - Chapter 2	—N/a	
May 30	Laufey	Filinvest Tent	Muntinlupa	Karpos Live: Laufey in Manila	Part of the Karpos Live concert series by Karpos Multimedia	
May 30	Vader, Hate, Thy Disease	Ynares Sports Arena	Pasig	Vader, Hate, Thy Disease in Manila	—N/a	
June 4	Minzy	New Frontier Theater	Quezon	Minzy 1st Asia Tour: Glee in Manila	—N/a	
June 9	Jeremy Zucker	Mega Fashion Hall — SM Megamall	Mandaluyong	Jeremy Zucker Fanmeet: Your Internet Crush in Manila	—N/a	
June 10	Park Bom	New Frontier Theater	Quezon	You & I	—N/a	
June 11	Metawin Opas-iamkajorn	New Frontier Theater	Quezon	Win 1st Solo Fan Meet	—N/a	
June 11	Various K-pop artists	Araneta Coliseum	Quezon	Overpass: K-pop Music Concert	—N/a	
June 16	Fra Lippo Lippi	The Theatre, Solaire Resort & Casino	Parañaque	Fra Lippo Lippi Live!	—N/a	
June 17	Fra Lippo Lippi	Santa Rosa Sports Complex	Santa Rosa	Fra Lippo Lippi Live!	—N/a	
June 17	Ive	Araneta Coliseum	Quezon	The Prom Queens: Asia Tour	—N/a	
June 17	Woodz	New Frontier Theater	Quezon	2023 Woodz World Tour: Oo-Li	—N/a	
June 17	Cast of Cutie Pie	Aliw Theater	Pasay	Cutie Pie: First Fan Meeting in Manila	—N/a	
June 22	Mario Maurer, Mike Angelo, Davika Hoorne, Perses	World Trade Center	Pasay	The Exchange: Thailand	With AC Bonifacio, BGYO, and Donny Pangilinan	
June 24	NCT DoJaeJung	Mall of Asia Arena	Pasay	Scented Symphony: Fancon in Manila	—N/a	
June 24	Park Eun-bin	New Frontier Theater	Quezon	Park Eun-bin Fanmeet in Manila	—N/a	
June 24–25	Bruno Mars	Philippine Arena	Bocaue	Bruno Mars Live	—N/a	
June 30	Nmixx	New Frontier Theater	Quezon	Nmixx Showcase Tour: Nice to Mixx You	—N/a	
July 2	Cha Eun-woo	Araneta Coliseum	Quezon	Dunkin' Donuts Presents: Bundles of Charm	—N/a	
July 6	You Me at Six	Skydome – SM City North EDSA	Quezon	Truth Decay Tour	—N/a	
July 8	Lee Sung-kyung	Skydome – SM City North EDSA	Quezon	Lee Sung-kyung Asia Fanmeet: Be Closer	—N/a	
July 9	Yuri	New Frontier Theater	Quezon	Yuri 2nd FanMeet: Chapter 2	—N/a	
July 14	HYBS	Filinvest Tent	Muntinlupa	Karpos Live: HYBS in Manila	Part of the Karpos Live concert series	
July 14	Bang Yong-guk	Music Museum	San Juan	The Colors of Bang Yong-guk	—N/a	
July 15	Javier Parisi	Music Museum	San Juan	John Lennon Tribute Night with Javier Parisi	—N/a	
July 15	The Boyz	Araneta Coliseum	Quezon	Zeneration: The Boyz World Tour	—N/a	
July 18	Vertical Horizon	Skydome – SM City North EDSA	Quezon	Vertical Horizon Live in Manila	With Autotelic and Join the Club as opening acts.	
July 19	Daniel Caesar	World Trade Center	Pasay	Superpowers World Tour	with special guest Jason Dhakal	
July 19	Rini	Samsung Hall – SM Aura Premier	Taguig	Past the Naked Eye 2023 Tour	—N/a	
July 21	Super Junior	Araneta Coliseum	Quezon	Super Junior Fan Party in Manila	—N/a	
July 21–23	Planetshakers	Mall of Asia Arena	Pasay	Show Me Your Glory Tour: Manila/Pasay City	featuring Planetboom, returned after three years.	
July 23	Apink, CIX, Lee Min-hyuk, Nam Woo-hyun	New Frontier Theater	Quezon	Be You 3: The World Will Smile	—N/a	
July 25	Sabrina Carpenter	New Frontier Theater	Quezon	Emails I Can't Send Tour	—N/a	
July 25	dhruv	The Podium	Mandaluyong	DHRUV in Manila	—N/a	
July 25	Peach Tree Rascals	Maybank Performing Arts Theater	Taguig	Asia Tour 2023	—N/a	
July 30	Taeyeon	Araneta Coliseum	Quezon	Taeyeon Concert: The Odd of Love in Manila	—N/a	
August 1–2	Alanis Morissette	Mall of Asia Arena	Pasay	World Tour: 25 Years of Jagged Little Pill	With Ice Seguerra as the opening act. Originally scheduled to be held in 2020 but was postponed due to the COVID-19 pandemic. Concert was later rescheduled to November 18–19, 2022, but postponed again due to scheduling conflicts and logistical challenging issues.	
August 5	Cast of My School President	University of the Philippines Diliman – University Theater	Quezon	My School President 1st Fan Meet in Manila	—N/a	
August 5	Cravity	New Frontier Theater	Quezon	Cravity First World Tour: Masterpiece	—N/a	
August 5	IKon	Araneta Coliseum	Quezon	2023 IKon World Tour: Take Off	—N/a	
August 5	Valley	Ayala Malls Manila Bay	Pasay	Valley: Lost in Translation Asia Tour	—N/a	
August 5	Eric Nam	Market! Market!	Taguig	Eric Nam Live	—N/a	
August 5	Benson Boone	Venice Grand Canal	Taguig	Benson Boone Live!	—N/a	
August 9	Mr. Big	Skydome – SM City North EDSA	Quezon	The BIG Finish	—N/a	
August 12	Seo In-guk	New Frontier Theater	Quezon	Seo In-guk 1st Fanmeet in Manila	Hosted by Kristel Fulgar	
August 13	Tomorrow X Together	Philippine Arena	Bocaue	Act: Sweet Mirage	—N/a	
August 15	Bruno Major	Samsung Performing Arts Theater, Circuit Makati	Makati	Tour of Planet Earth	—N/a	
August 15	Umi	Samsung Hall – SM Aura Premier	Taguig	Insignia Concert Series: Umi	Part of the Insignia Concert Series by Insignia Presents	
August 19	Mac Ayres	Samsung Hall – SM Aura Premier	Taguig	Insignia Concert Series: Mac Ayres	Part of the Insignia Concert Series by Insignia Presents	
August 19	Bokeem Woodbine	Newport Performing Arts Center	Pasay	13 Purple Dragons Rocks Manila	—N/a	
August 19–20	Various casts	The Theatre, Solaire Resort & Casino	Parañaque	Harry Potter and the Chamber of Secrets in Concert	—N/a	
August 20	Han Seung-woo	Skydome – SM City North EDSA	Quezon	Han Seung-woo Asia Tour: Special Live One	—N/a	
August 25–26	Various casts from West End theatre	Newport Performing Arts Theater	Pasay	Mania: The ABBA Tribute	—N/a	
August 28	Dreamcatcher	New Frontier Theater	Quezon	Dreamcatcher: Under the Moonlight in Manila	—N/a	
August 31	Turnover	Skydome – SM City North EDSA	Quezon	Turnover Live in Manila	—N/a	
August 31	Anson Seabra	Filinvest Tent	Muntinlupa	The Neverland Tour Asia	—N/a	
September 9–10	Engelbert Humperdinck	Newport Performing Arts Theater	Pasay	The Legend Continues: Engelbert Humperdinck Live	—N/a	
September 9	P1Harmony	New Frontier Theater	Quezon	P1USTAGE: P1ONEER	—N/a	
September 9	Tilly Birds	Skydome – SM City North EDSA	Quezon	Tilly Birds Live in Manila	—N/a	
September 9	Lauv	Waterfront Hotel & Casino	Cebu	The All 4 Nothing Tour	With special guest Alexander 23	
September 11	Lauv	Mall of Asia Arena	Pasay	The All 4 Nothing Tour	With special guest Alexander 23	
September 13	Niki	Mall of Asia Arena	Pasay	Nicole World Tour	—N/a	
September 14	Kodaline	Filinvest Tent	Muntinlupa	Karpos Live: Kodaline	Part of the Karpos Live concert series by Karpos Multimedia	
September 16	Ateez	Araneta Coliseum	Quezon	The Fellowship: Break the Wall	—N/a	
September 18	Post Malone	Mall of Asia Arena	Pasay	If Y'all Weren't Here, I'd Be Crying Tour	—N/a	
September 19	Joan	New Frontier Theater	Quezon	Joan Live in Manila	—N/a	
September 22	BamBam	Araneta Coliseum	Quezon	BamBam 1st World Tour: Area 51	—N/a	
September 22	Neck Deep	Skydome – SM City North EDSA	Quezon	Neck Deep Live in Manila	—N/a	
September 22	Kim Bum	New Frontier Theater	Quezon	KIM BUM: Between U and Me	—N/a	
September 23	Kim Bum	Nustar Resort and Casino	Cebu	KIM BUM: Between U and Me	—N/a	
September 23	Jimbo, Violet Chachki	The Forum – Philippine International Convention Center	Pasay	Manila Drag Revolution	—N/a	
September 26	One Ok Rock	Araneta Coliseum	Quezon	Luxury Disease Asia Tour 2023	—N/a	
September 29	Anna of the North	Samsung Hall – SM Aura Premier	Taguig	Crazy Tour	—N/a	
September 30	Eunhyuk, Donghae	Araneta Coliseum	Quezon	D&E World Tour Fancon: [DElight PARTY]	—N/a	
September 30	Jamie Miller	U.P. Town Center	Quezon	Jamie Miller: First Fan Meet in Manila	—N/a	
September 30 – October 1	Twice	Philippine Arena	Bocaue	Ready to Be World Tour	Chaeyoung did not join due to health concerns.	
September–November	Various casts	The Theatre, Solaire Resort & Casino	Parañaque	Hamilton	—N/a	
October 1	Kim Se-jeong	New Frontier Theater	Quezon	2023 Kim Se-jeong 1st Concert: The 門	—N/a	
October 5	Sabrina Claudio	Samsung Hall – SM Aura Premier	Taguig	Insignia Concert Series: Sabrina Claudio	Part of the Insignia Concert Series by Insignia Presents	
October 8	Against the Current	Skydome – SM City North EDSA	Quezon	Nightmares and Daydreams	—N/a	
October 8	Rex Orange County	Araneta Coliseum	Quezon	Rex Orange County Live in New Zealand, Australia and Asia 2023	—N/a	
October 8	Hwang Min-hyun	New Frontier Theater	Quezon	Unveil: Hwang Min-hyun Mini Concert	—N/a	
October 8	Ahn Hyo-seop	Mall of Asia Arena	Pasay	Here and Now: Ahn Hyo-seop Asia Fan Meet	—N/a	
October 12	A1	SMX Convention Center – SM Lanang Premier	Davao	A1: Twenty Five	—N/a	
October 13	A1	Waterfront Hotel & Casino	Cebu	A1: Twenty Five	—N/a	
October 14–15	A1	New Frontier Theater	Quezon	A1: Twenty Five	—N/a	
October 14	Park Seo-joon	Araneta Coliseum	Quezon	Park Seo-joon Fun Meet in Manila	—N/a	
October 15	Lee Min-ho	SMX Convention Center	Pasay	SMDC Celebrates SM @ 65 with Lee Min-ho	—N/a	
October 17	George and Youra	Filinvest Tent	Muntinlupa	Karpos Live Presents George and Youra	Part of the Karpos Live concert series by Karpos Multimedia	
October 21	Sam Smith	Mall of Asia Arena	Pasay	Gloria World Tour	—N/a	
October 21	Kim Young-dae	New Frontier Theater	Quezon	Fall in Love Young-dae Manila	—N/a	
October 22	Lukas Graham	New Frontier Theater	Quezon	Lukas Graham Live	—N/a	
October 22–23	The Corrs	Araneta Coliseum	Quezon	The Corrs Live in Manila	—N/a	
October 27	Mayday Parade	New Frontier Theater	Quezon	Mayday Parade Live in Manila	—N/a	
October 28	Mayday Parade	Skyhall – SM Seaside City Cebu	Cebu	Mayday Parade Live in Cebu	—N/a	
October 28	Bebe Rexha	Mall of Asia Arena	Pasay	Best F'n Night of My Life	—N/a	
October 28	Sasha Colby	TBA	Manila	Halloqueen Ball	—N/a	
October 30	Sasha Colby	TBA	Cebu	Halloqueen Ball	—N/a	
October 30	Mayday Parade	SMX Convention Center – SM Lanang Premier	Davao	Mayday Parade Live in Davao	—N/a	
October 31	Silverstein	Skydome – SM City North EDSA	Quezon	Silverstein Live!	—N/a	
November 3–4	Saosin	Skydome – SM City North EDSA	Quezon	Saosin Asia Tour	—N/a	
November 8	Yungblud	Skydome – SM City North EDSA	Quezon	Yungblud Asia Tour	—N/a	
November 10	Grrrl Gang	Balcony Music House	Makati	Grrrl Gang Live in Manila	With special guests Oh, Flamingo!, Ena Mori, Clara Benin, Ligaya Escueta, and The Purest Blue	
November 11	Lee Jun-ho	Mall of Asia Arena	Pasay	Junho: The Moment	—N/a	
November 14	Corinne Bailey Rae	Filinvest Tent	Muntinlupa	Black Rainbows Tour	—N/a	
November 16	Charlie Burg	Balcony Music House	Makati	Insignia Concert Series: Charlie Burg	Part of the Insignia Concert Series by Insignia Presents. The concert was initially planned to be held at Samsung Hall at SM Aura in Taguig, but was moved to a different venue for unknown reasons.	
November 16	Choi Woo-shik	Skydome – SM City North EDSA	Quezon	Pinky Promise	—N/a	
November 17–19	Diana Lee Inosanto, Emily Swallow, Mackenyu, Mela Lee	Ayala Malls Manila Bay	Parañaque	Manipopcon 2023	—N/a	
November 18–19	Various Broadway actors	Samsung Hall – SM Aura Premier	Taguig	Disney Princess: The Concert	—N/a	
November 20	Johnny Orlando	Filinvest Tent	Muntinlupa	The Ride: Live on Tour	—N/a	
November 21	Various Broadway actors	SMX Convention Center – SM Lanang Premier	Davao	Disney Princess: The Concert	—N/a	
November 22	Various Broadway actors	Waterfront Hotel & Casino	Cebu	Disney Princess: The Concert	—N/a	
November 22	Luca Brugnoli	Carlos P. Romulo Auditorium, RCBC Plaza	Makati	Luca in Concert	—N/a	
November 24–25	Il Divo	Newport Performing Arts Theater	Pasay	A New Day Tour	—N/a	
November 25	A Flock of Seagulls, Frank Kearns of Cactus World News, Peter Coyle of The Lotus Eaters, Steve Kilbey of The Church	Ninoy Aquino Stadium	Manila	New Wave Invasion	Also featuring Orange and Lemons, Innervoices, and Violent Playground.	
November 26	Engfa Waraha	Newport Performing Arts Theater	Pasay	The Grand Concert	—N/a	
November 27	Daryl Hall	Mall of Asia Arena	Pasay	Daryl Hall and the Daryl's House Band	—N/a	
November 28	Benny Sings, HYBS	Filinvest Tent	Muntinlupa	Karpos Live presents Benny Sings + HYBS	Part of the Karpos Live concert series by Karpos Multimedia	
November 28	Joji	Araneta Coliseum	Quezon	Pandemonium	—N/a	
December 2	Reality Club	123 Block, Mandala Park	Mandaluyong	Asia Tour 2023	—N/a	
December 3	Chloe Foston	Newport Performing Arts Theater	Pasay	Carpenters Reborn	—N/a	
December 4	D4vd	New Frontier Theater	Quezon	Petals to Thorns	—N/a	
December 6	Kiana Ledé	Samsung Hall – SM Aura Premier	Taguig	Grudges: The World Tour	Part of the Insignia Concert Series by Insignia Presents	
December 8	David Pomeranz	Newport Performing Arts Theater	Pasay	Coming Home: David Pomeranz 40th Anniversary Concert	With special guest, Vina Morales	
December 9	Fall Out Boy	Araneta Coliseum	Quezon	So Much For (Tour) Dust	—N/a	
December 11–13	Air Supply	Newport Performing Arts Theater	Pasay	Air Supply Live!	—N/a	
December 14	Various	Philippine Arena	Bocaue	8th Asia Artist Awards	—N/a	
December 15	Air Supply	Santa Rosa Sports Complex	Santa Rosa	Air Supply Live!	—N/a	
December 16	Park Chanyeol	Mall of Asia Arena	Pasay	Chanyeol Fan Meet in Manila	—N/a	
December 16	Tay Tawan, New Thitipoom, Off Jumpol, and Gun Atthaphan	New Frontier Theater	Quezon	BELUCA 1st Fan Meeting in Manila	—N/a	
December 22–30	Various casts	Mall of Asia Arena	Pasay	Disney on Ice	—N/a	
December 30	—N/a	Samsung Hall – SM Aura Premier	Taguig	Spider-Man: Into the Spider-Verse – Live in Concert	Featuring a live orchestra led by songwriter/composer Daniel Pemberton.	
December 31	Irene, Wendy, and Seulgi (of Red Velvet)	5th Avenue, Bonifacio Global City	Taguig	NYE at the 5th	Also featuring Ely Buendia, KZ Tandingan, Zack Tabudlo, and Adie.	
December 31	Le Twins, Pretty Dragon, Jade Rasif, Ari & Hyunah	Cove Manila, Okada Manila	Parañaque	2024 Ready for More – Okada Manila New Year's Eve Countdown	With supporting acts from Migs Santillan and Mike Lavarez, with MC by Victor Pring.	

=== Music festivals ===
Date(s)	Event	Venue	City	Notable performers	Note(s)	Ref(s)
January 7	Rekta sa Kalye: Circus Music Festival	Circuit Makati	Makati	December Avenue; Zack Tabudlo; Silent Sanctuary; Unique; Al James	Part of the Circus Music Festival series.	
January 13–14	Wavy Baby Music Festival	North Reclamation Area	Mandaue	Pink Sweats; Sunmi; The Rose; Destiny Rogers; Bag Raiders; James Reid; Ben&Ben; December Avenue; Urbandub; Franco; SOS Dumbfoundead	JVKE was cancelled due to unforeseeable reasons.	
January 15	Follow the Movement: AOMG World Tour 2023	New Frontier Theater	Quezon	Simon Dominic; Loco; Gray; Lee Hi; Yugyeom	—N/a	
January 19–22	Dinagyang Music Festival 2023	Festive Walk Mall	Iloilo	Kice; Sam Concepcion	—N/a	
January 21	Howlers Manila 2023	Circuit Makati	Makati	Bamboo; Gloc-9; Shanti Dope; Magnus Haven; Mayonnaise	—N/a	
January 21	New Year, New Scene	123 Block, Mandala Park	Mandaluyong	Ena Mori; Munimuni; SOS	—N/a	
February 14–18	UP Fair 2023	Sunken Garden, University of the Philippines Diliman	Quezon	Ben&Ben; Moonstar88; Autotelic; Al James; The Itchyworms; Munimuni; Mayonnaise; Unique; Kean Cipriano; Lola Amour; Orange and Lemons; Ebe Dancel; Kiyo; December Avenue; I Belong to the Zoo; mrld; Tanya Markova; Eva Le Queen; Lady Morgana; Turing; 6cyclemind; The Juans; Quest; Sandwich	The aggregated event for the 2023 edition is divided into 5 events: REV Music Festival (Tuesday, Feb. 14); Kalye Tunes (Wednesday, Feb. 15); Dimensions (Thursday, Feb. 16); Polaris (Friday, Feb. 17); Cosmos (Saturday, Feb. 18)	
February 18	PLUS63 Festival Cebu	SM Seaside City Cebu	Cebu	Joji; Kehlani	—N/a	
February 18	Rakpublika 2023	Malolos Sports and Convention Center	Malolos	Franco; Basti Artadi; Chicosci	—N/a	
February 25	Bobapalooza Music & Arts Festival	Circuit Makati	Makati	Parokya ni Edgar; Kamikazee; The Itchyworms	—N/a	
March 4–5	Wanderland Music and Arts Festival	Filinvest City Event Grounds	Muntinlupa	Carly Rae Jepsen; Phoenix; FKJ; Dashboard Confessional; ((( O ))); Raveena; Sunset Rollercoaster; No Rome; Men I Trust; Balming Tiger; Ylona Garcia; Rico Blanco; Blaster Silonga	South Korean rapper Bobby was initially included in the festival's lineup for March 5, but his performance was cancelled due to unforeseen events.	
March 24	Wacken Metal Battle Philippines 2023	Amoranto Sports Complex	Quezon	Deadsquad; Disentomb; Greyhoundz; Typecast	—N/a	
April 15–16	Aurora Music Festival	Clark Global City	Angeles	Ely Buendia; Ben&Ben; Parokya ni Edgar; December Avenue; Sponge Cola; Kamikazee; Arthur Nery; Mayonnaise; Silent Sanctuary; Lola Amour; mrld	—N/a	
April 22	Rekta sa Kalye: Circus Music Festival 2	Circuit Makati	Makati	Parokya ni Edgar; Ben&Ben; Kamikazee; Ebe Dancel; Gloc-9; Arthur Nery; December Avenue; Al James; Silent Sanctuary; Flow G; Skusta Clee; The Itchyworms; Sponge Cola; Shanti Dope; Hale; SunKissed Lola; Aia de Leon; Bandang Lapis; The Juans	Part of the Circus Music Festival series, and the first series separated from the Rekta sa Kalye series.	
April 29	Castaway Music Festival	SM City Pampanga	San Fernando	December Avenue; The Juans; Rocksteddy	—N/a	
April 27	We Play Here Festival	Samsung Hall – SM Aura Premier	Taguig	Felip; Dilaw; Lola Amour; Leanne & Naara	—N/a	
April 29–30	Love Boracay: Beach Music Festival	Boracay Newcoast Beachfront, Boracay	Malay	Various DJs	—N/a	
April 30	Momentum Music Festival	Filinvest City Event Grounds	Muntinlupa	Kamikazee; Ben&Ben; December Avenue; The Juans; Rocksteddy; Unique; Barbie Almalbis; Lola Amour	Originally scheduled for February 22, but was postponed due to scheduling issues.	
May 13	Zark Fest 2023	Circuit Makati	Makati	Ben&Ben; Zack Tabudlo; Urbandub; Ebe Dancel; Sandwich; The Itchyworms; Bini; SOS; Autotelic; Lola Amour	—N/a	
May 13	2023 Maligaya Summer Blast	Philippine Arena	Bocaue	Sponge Cola; Gloc-9; Silent Sanctuary; Rocksteddy; Bandang Lapis; SunKissed Lola; Dilaw	—N/a	
May 19–20	Sigla: Music and Arts Festival	Batangas Lakelands	Batangas	Ben&Ben; Kamikazee; Sponge Cola; Rivermaya; Morissette; Gloc-9; Arthur Nery; Silent Sanctuary; Shanti Dope; SunKissed Lola; Munimuni; Bandang Lapis	—N/a	
June 16–17, 21–25	Fête de la Musique Philippines 2023	Various locations		Various artists	—N/a	
June 23	Fête de la Musique Philippines 2023	Greenbelt	Makati	Blaster Silonga; Lola Amour; Cheats; SOS; Gabba	—N/a	
June 30	Wave: Foam Music Festival	Filinvest City Event Grounds	Muntinlupa	Various DJs	Originally scheduled for May 27, but was postponed for unknown reasons.	
July 22	Southside Rhythm Fest	City di Mare Events Ground, South Road Properties	Cebu	Parokya ni Edgar; Sponge Cola	—N/a	
August 12	Zero8Two Music Festival	Crocodile Park Concert Grounds	Davao	Kamikazee; Parokya ni Edgar; December Avenue; Missing Filemon	—N/a	
August 19–20	Malaya Music Fest 2023	Okada Manila	Parañaque	BINI; BGYO; Ben&Ben; John Roa; Kenaniah; Dionela; Ace Banzuelo; Mayonnaise; Silent Sanctuary; This Band; Barbie Almalbis; Pedicab	—N/a	
August 19–20	Tuguegarao Music Festival	Cagayan Sports Complex	Tuguegarao	Al James; Alisson Shore; December Avenue; Dilaw; Flow G; Kamikazee; Loonie; Nik Makino; Ron Henley; Shanti Dope; Silent Sanctuary; Sponge Cola; SunKissed Lola; Urbandub	—N/a	
August 20	The Truth Festival	Quezon Memorial Circle	Quezon	1st.One; Abra; Alamat; Autotelic; Calista; Cean Jr.; Dione; Fitz Shioda; G22; Jonel Revistual; KAIA; Kenaniah; Kobe Silvestre; Maimai Cantillano; Press Hit Play; Similar Sky; Sunday Special; Taylor Sheesh; This Band; Kean Cipriano	—N/a	
August 23–24	Toyota Gazoo Racing Festival 2023	Quirino Grandstand	Manila	Ben&Ben; Ely Buendia; Kamikazee; Parokya Ni Edgar	—N/a	
August 25	Linya-Linya Land 2023	123 Block, Mandala Park	Mandaluyong	Ebe Dancel; Cheats; Autotelic; Johnoy Danao	—N/a	
September 16	G Music Fest 2023	Circuit Makati	Makati	Itchyworms; Urbandub; BINI; Lola Amour; December Avenue; I Belong to the Zoo; Nobita; Mayonnaise; Ace Banzuelo; Munimuni; Dilaw	Also featuring the finalists of Drag Race Philippines season 2.	
September 29–30	Pinoy Playlist Music Festival 2023	BGC Arts Center	Taguig	Various	—N/a	
September 30	Circus Music Festival 3	Circuit Makati	Makati	Ely Buendia; Bamboo; Zack Tabudlo; Kamikazee; Sponge Cola; December Avenue; Armi Millare; Mayonnaise	Part of the Circus Music Festival series.	
September 30–October 1	Dutdutan Philippine Tattoo Convention	World Trade Center	Pasay	Hed PE; Agaw Agimat; Arcadia; Barbie Almalbis; Bishnu; Chocolate Factory; December Avenue; Flow G; Gloc9; Gracenote; Greyhoundz; Hero; Joey Ayala; Karl Banayad; Lockdown; Morobeats; O Side Mafia; P.O.T; Ramdiss; Redeemed by the Blood; Sandwich; Saydie; Skusta Clee; Tanya Markova; Teeth; The Chongkeys; Tres Marias; Tubero; Typecast; Underclass; Urbandub; Volley of Chrome; Wilabaliw; Zild	—N/a	
October 7	Barik Fest: Yabangan Nights	Batangas Provincial Sports Complex	Batangas	Bamboo; Hale; Kamikazee; Mayonnaise; Parokya ni Edgar; Sponge Cola	—N/a	
October 7	Song Hits Festival	Circuit Makati	Makati	Al James; Chndtr; December Avenue; Dilaw; Dionela; Franco; Gloc-9; Madeline; Mayonnaise; Nobita; One Click Straight; Orange and Lemons; Rico Blanco; Shanti Dope; Similar Sky; Urbandub; Zack Tabudlo; Zild	—N/a	
October 14	Hydro Manila Music Festival	Mall of Asia Concert Grounds	Pasay	Ace Ramos; Al James; Carla Cray; Flow G; Fluokids; Gloc-9; Kamikazee; Kiyo; Manila Bombsquad; O Side Mafia; Razikyle; Siangyoo; Silent Sanctuary; Urbandub; Zkittlez	Originally scheduled for August 26, but postponed indefinitely to pave way for the opening ceremony of the 2023 FIBA Basketball World Cup.	
October 23	Howlers Manila 2.0	Circuit Makati	Makati	Ely Buendia; Al James; Flow G; Silent Sanctuary; SexBomb Girls; KAIA	Originally scheduled on July 1 but was later moved due to inclement weather conditions.	
October 27	V1BE: Booze and Arts Festival	SM Seaside City Concert Grounds	Cebu	Rico Blanco; Shanti Dope; Urbandub; 6cyclemind; Gracenote; Zild; Dilaw; SunKissed Lola	—N/a	
October 28	Davao Aurora Fest 2023	Crocodile Park Concert Grounds	Davao	Rico Blanco; Ben&Ben; Armi Millare; Adie	Part of the Aurora Music Festival series.	
November 4	Hydro La Union: The Takeover	Poro Point	San Fernando	Flow G; Gracenote; Hilera; Kamikazee; Matthaios; Moonstar88; Pricetagg; Sandwich; Shanti Dope; Skusta Clee; Ultracombo; Zae	—N/a	
November 11	Fusion: The Philippine Music Festival 2023	SMDC Festival Grounds, Aseana City	Parañaque	Bamboo; Ben&Ben; KZ Tandingan; Gloc-9; Arthur Nery; 6cyclemind; Shanti Dope; Morissette; Gracenote; Al James; Lola Amour	This marks the return of the annual Fusion Music Festival for the first time since 2017. Originally scheduled for May 27, but was postponed due to Typhoon Betty.	
November 18	Rekta sa Kalye Music Festival 2023	CCP Complex	Pasay	1096 Gang; Al James; Alisson Shore; Because; December Avenue; Dilaw; Dong Abay; Flow G; Franco; Gins and Melodies; Just Hush; Kiyo; Lola Amour; Loonie; Madd Mark; Mayonnaise; Mira; Nobita; Omar Baliw; O Side Mafia; Parokya ni Edgar; Rico Blanco; Sandwich; Silent Sanctuary; Urbandub; Trifluoride; Tus Brothers; Waiian; YB Neet; Zae; Zild	—N/a	
November 25–26	Rakrakan Festival 2023: 2 Days of Peace, Love and Music	SMDC Festival Grounds, Aseana City	Parañaque	Rico Blanco; Unique; Zild Benitez; Blaster Silonga; December Avenue; Mayonnaise; Bandang Lapis; mrld; Dilaw; Kean Cipriano; Gracenote; Moonstar88; SunKissed Lola; Magnus Haven; Imago; Tanya Markova; Kiyo; This Band; Silent Sanctuary; Barbie Almalbis; Siakol; Brownman Revival; The Youth; Basti Artadi; Greyhoundz; Razorback; Chicosci; Typecast; Dong Abay; Franco; P.O.T.; Urbandub; 6cyclemind; MOJOFLY	The 2020 edition of the festival was originally planned to be held at the CCP Open Grounds in Pasay on February 29, 2020, but was postponed due to the COVID-19 pandemic. Originally scheduled on June 10–11 at Clark Global City in Pampanga, but was later postponed and will reschedule to a later date due to possible inclement weather conditions. This marks the final run of the Rakrakan Festival.	
December 2	SongHits Festival: Volume 1	Melvin Jones Grandstand	Baguio	Al James; Gloc9; Kamikazee; Madeline; Orange and Lemons; Similar Sky; Shanti Dope; Urbandub	—N/a	
December 2	Sibul: Arts and Music Festival	New Clark City Athletics Stadium	Capas	13th Verse; Acel Bisa; Barbie Almalbis; Blaster and the Celestial Clowns; Dream Seven; Ely Buendia; Franco; J.King; Joe S. Rizla; Join the Club; Jr Crown; Juan Karlos; Kamikazee; Kiyo; Lala Vinzon; Mayonnaise; Michael Libranda; Ney; Rhodessa; Rocksteddy; Sandwich; Shanni; SunKissed Lola; The Juans; The Walwals; Thome; Tricia; Typecast; Zsara	—N/a	
December 2	Maginhawa Arts & Food Festival	Maginhawa St.	Quezon	Dilaw; Over October; The Ridleys; Ang Bandang Shirley	—N/a	
December 15	JBL Sound Fest 2023	Mall of Asia Concert Grounds	Pasay	Kamikazee; Parokya ni Edgar; Adie; H3rizon; Tigerlily; Al James	—N/a	
December 15	GNN Year-End Party 2023	123 Block, Mandala Park	Mandaluyong	SOS; Ang Bandang Shirley; The Ransom Collective; Oh, Flamingo!; Ciudad	—N/a	
December 16	Agila Music Fest	Amoranto Sports Complex	Quezon	Black Rosary; Chocolate Factory; Flow G; Repakol; Typecast; Yeng Constantino	—N/a	
December 17	UMusic Fanverse 2023	Enchanted Kingdom	Santa Rosa	Juan Karlos; Zild; Jayda; Janine Berdin; Blaster; Dionela; One Click Straight; VXON; G22; AJAA; Yes My Love; Elha Nympha; Cydel; Isang; Shane Bernabe; Daniel Paringit; CHNDTR; Chen; Gab Tagadtad; Dia Maté; Zack Tabudlo	—N/a	
December 22	Maskipaps: the Crossover 2023	Sunken Garden, University of the Philippines Diliman	Quezon	Lola Amour; Ben&Ben; Adie; Al James; Cup of Joe; Any Name's Okay; Dilaw; Mayonnaise; One Click Straight; Janine Berdin; Ron Poe; DJ Razikyle; ZkittleZ	This marks the first Maskipaps festival event since 2019.	
December 22	PASKOJAM: Pasig Musicfest 2023	Arcovia City	Pasig	Mayonnaise; Nobita; SunKissed Lola; Sud; Madeline; Mojofly	Hosted by Nonong Ballinan and Joy Barcoma.	

=== Cancelled/postponed shows ===
Scheduled Date(s)	Headliner(s)	Venue	City	Event / Tour	Note(s)	Ref(s)
July 27	Lewis Capaldi	New Frontier Theater	Quezon	Broken By Desire To Be Heavenly Sent	Cancelled for personal reasons.	
August 11	Kep1er; Lapillus; Mamamoo+; Sandara Park	Mall of Asia Arena	Pasay	Super Stage by K-pop	Cancelled due to undisclosed reasons.	
September 16	Ely Buendia; Bamboo; Armi Millare; Silent Sanctuary; Missing Filemon	Open Lot at Former Marreco, Brgy. Poblacion	Mandaue	Cebu Aurora Fest 2023	Postponed due to unforeseen circumstances. Reschedule to a later date. Part of the Aurora Music Festival series.	
September 23	Autotelic; Leanne & Naara; The Ridleys; Arthur Miguel; Paolo Sandejas	McKinley Whiskey Park	Taguig	Park & Jams	Postponed. Originally scheduled on July 15, then moved to July 29 but was later postponed due to inclement weather conditions. The Itchyworms was also originally part of the lineup, but cancelled their appearance.	
October 14	Aminé; Mxmtoon; Lola Amour	SMDC Festival Grounds, Aseana City	Parañaque	PLUS63 Festival Manila	Postponed indefinitely. Weezer was also part of the original lineup, but cancelled their appearance when the postponement was announced.	
October 28	Bebe Rexha; T.I.	Mall of Asia Arena	Pasay	Folklore: A Halloween Festival	Cancelled due to Barangay and SK Elections.	

== Top songs on record ==
=== Philippines Songs No. 1 Songs ===
- "Die for You" – The Weeknd and Ariana Grande (4 weeks)
- "Flowers" – Miley Cyrus (2 weeks)
- "Kill Bill" – SZA (6 weeks)
- "Pasilyo" – SunKissed Lola (1 week)
- "Uhaw" – Dilaw (3 weeks)

=== Philippines Songs Top 10 Hits ===
All songs that reached the Top 10 on the Billboard Philippines Songs chart during the year, complete with peak chart placement.

- "All I Want for Christmas Is You – Mariah Carey (#10)
- "All of the Girls You Loved Before" – Taylor Swift (#6)
- "Boys a Liar Pt. 2" – PinkPantheress & Ice Spice (#8)
- "Cupid" – Fifty Fifty (#2)
- "Die for You" – The Weeknd and Ariana Grande (#1)
- "Ditto" – NewJeans (#2)
- "Elevate" – Jeff Grecia (#4)
- "Flower" – Jisoo (#4)
- "Flowers" – Miley Cyrus (#1)
- "Kill Bill" – SZA (#3)
- "Like Crazy" – Jimin (#7)
- "Nonsense" – Sabrina Carpenter (#6)
- "OMG" – NewJeans (#2)
- "Pasilyo" – SunKissed Lola (#1)
- "Reminder" – The Weeknd (#6)
- "Snooze" – SZA (#2)
- "Uhaw" – Dilaw (#1)

== Deaths ==
- January 29 – Dennis Fabunan (b. 1981), Maria Cafra bassist
- November 15 – Jograd dela Torre (b. 1960), singer-comedian
- December 8 – Kokoi Baldo (b. 1979), reggae singer
- December 30 – Jay Unchuan (b. 1977), vocal coach
