= Brisom =

Filipino synthwave pop band

- Origin: Metro Manila, Philippines
- Genres: indie pop; alternative; synthwave
- Years active: 2013–present
- Labels: Warner Music Philippines (2016–2018); Viva Records (2018–present)
- Members: Brian Sombero; Timothy Abbott; Jason Rondero; Jeffrey Castro; Kara Mendez
- Past members: Terence Teves; MJ Dantes
- Website: brisom.bandcamp.com

Brisom is a synthwave pop band from Manila, Philippines. Formed in 2013, it is composed of Brian Sombero on vocals, guitars and synths, Timothy Abbott on synths, beats and programming, Jason Rondero on bass, Jeffrey Castro on drums and samplers, and Kara Mendez on bass and vocals.

The band has been known for their 80s-inspired synth music. They released their debut EP Perspectives in 2014, followed by the release of their full-length album Limerence in 2016.

Previously signed under Warner Music Philippines, the band is currently signed to Viva Records.

== Band members ==
=== Current ===
- Brian Sombero – vocals, guitars, synths
- Timothy Abbott – synths, beats, programming
- Jason Rondero – bass
- Jeffrey Castro – drums, samplers
- Kara Mendez - bass, vocals

=== Former ===
- Terence Teves
- MJ Dantes

== Discography ==
=== Studio albums ===
- Limerence (2016)

=== EPs ===
- Perspectives (2014)

=== Singles ===
- "Muted in Color"
- "Unplanned"
- "Balewala"
- "Siglon"
- "Hagkan"

== Awards and nominations ==
Year	Award	Category	Notable Works	Result
2018	Myx Music Awards 2018	Rock Video of the Year	Balewala	Won
2018	Myx Music Awards 2018	MYX Bandarito Performance of the Year	—	Nominated
