= Ace Banzuelo =

Filipino singer (born 2000)

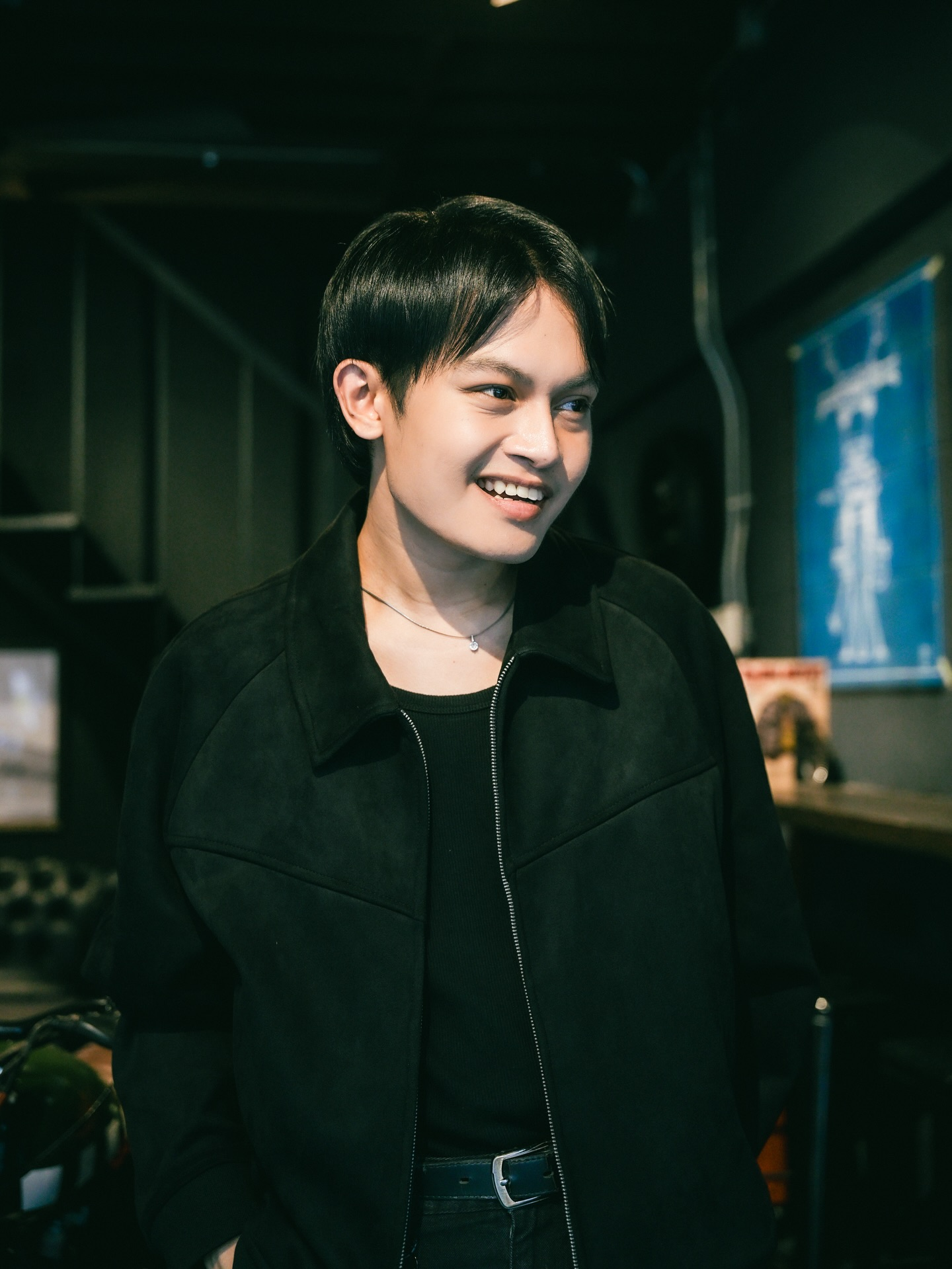
- Banzuelo in 2026

Background information
- Born: August 10, 2000 (age 26); Manila, Philippines
- Origin: Manila, Philippines
- Genres: Pop; R&B; OPM
- Occupations: Singer; songwriter; musician; record producer
- Instruments: Vocals, Electric Guitar, Keyboards, MIDI, Synthesizers, Bass, Beatbox, Acoustic Guitar
- Years active: 2004-2012 (Early Performing Years), 2018–present

Ace Banzuelo (born August 10, 2000), is a Filipino singer-songwriter and musician. He gained mainstream popularity of his song "Muli" and it ranked as the seventh highest-charting song on the Billboard Philippines Songs in 2022, considering only its performance during a 22-week tracking period.

His 2020 single "Muli" has become the most streamed OPM song in the platform aside from placing third in the Spotify's Philippines Top 200. It also ranked second in the Viral 50 Philippines chart.

== Early life ==
Banzuelo was born in Makati City, Metro Manila and was raised in Laguna and Batangas.

== Artistry ==
Banzuelo described as r&b, Dream pop, pop, synthwave, and city pop.

== Discography ==
=== Singles ===
- If You Only Knew - released in 2018
- Like Like You - released in 2018
- High On You - released in 2019
- Tayo Na Lang - released in 2019
- Tala - released in 2019
- Seresa - released in 2019
- Malayo - released in 2020
- Muli - released in 2020
- Safe - released in 2020
- Himala - released in 2020
- Mayari - released in 2021
- Alive - released in 2021
- Babae - released in 2022
- Walang Himala - released in 2022
- Kulang - released in 2022
- Tadhana - released in 2023
- Pag-Ibig (Meron Ba?) - released in 2023
- Bighani - released in 2024
- Girl, You're on My Mind - released in 2024
- hagkan - released in 2025
- hindi mo alam - released in 2025
- hagkan - released in 2026
