= Strike Whilst the Iron Is Hot =

2005 studio album by Orange and Lemons

Studio album by Orange & Lemons
- Released: April 28, 2005
- Recorded: 2004
- Studio: Sonic State Audio
- Genres: Rock; OPM; Psychedelia
- Length: 61:00
- Label: Universal Records
- Producers: Robert Javier, Bella Tan

Singles from Strike Whilst the Iron Is Hot
- 1. "Lihim" Released: September 16, 2004; 2. "Hanggang Kailan (Umuwi Ka Na Baby)" Released: March 16, 2005; 3. "Heaven Knows (This Angel Has Flown)" Released: June 16, 2005

Strike Whilst the Iron Is Hot (2004 Demo Sessions)

Compilation album by Orange & Lemons
- Released: May 29, 2020
- Recorded: 2004
- Label: Universal Records
- 15th anniversary special album

Strike Whilst the Iron Is Hot is the second album created by Orange and Lemons, released on April 28, 2005, by Universal Records. The album earned double platinum status with its hits "Hanggang Kailan (Umuwi Ka Na Baby)" and "Heaven Knows (This Angel Has Flown)".

== Background ==
After releasing their debut album Love in the Land of Rubber Shoes and Dirty Ice Cream, they signed a contract with Universal Records October 2004, making Strike Whilst the Iron Is Hot their first major album. The album went on to get a Double Platinum.

The song "Pinoy Ako" was used by ABS-CBN for the Pinoy Big Brother, which was used as the theme song and background music. Though the song had some controversy because it sounded like "Chandelier" by The Cure. Universal Records released a Repackaged Edition later that year, which included a bonus VCD.

To commemorate the album's legacy, the band celebrated its 15th anniversary in 2020 by releasing their demo sessions for Strike Whilst the Iron Is Hot (2004 Demo Sessions) on May 29, 2020. They were supposed to celebrate the 15th anniversary together with the albums of Pedicab and Dicta License, but because of the COVID-19 pandemic, they were unable to. The group decided to host a private virtual live concert in Facebook.

== Personnel ==
Musicians

- Clem Castro - lead vocalist (tracks 1, 3, 5, 7, 9, 11), lead and rhythm guitars, string/orchestral arrangements
- Mcoy Fundales - vocals (tracks 2, 4, 6, 8, 10, 12), acoustic guitar
- JM del Mundo - bass guitar
- Ace del Mundo - drum tracks

Additional musicians

- Raymond Pagdanganan - writer for "Yer So Special"

Producers

- Bella Tan - executive producer
- Robert Javier - producer
- Angee Rozul - engineer (drum tracks)
- Bogie Manipon - engineer (guitar, vocals, and other instruments), master and mixer
- Jonathan Ong - recorder and engineer

Design

- Claude Rodrigo - cover art design and concept

Studios

- Tracks Studios - drum tracks
- Cloud 9 Studios - vocals, guitar and other instruments
- Sonic State Audio - recorder

== Track listing ==
Strike Whilst the Iron Is Hot track listing
No.	Title	Producers	Length
1.	"Strike Whilst The Iron Is Hot"	Clem Castro	2:52
2.	"Hanggang Kailan (Umuwi Ka Na Baby)"	Clem Castro	4:22
3.	"Cycle of Love"	Clem Castro	3:08
4.	"Rock-A-Bye"	Mcoy Fundales	2:58
5.	"Pabango Ng 'Yong Mata"	Clem Castro	4:20
6.	"Heaven Knows (This Angel Has Flown)"	Clem Castro	4:01
7.	"Yer So Special"	Raymond Pagdanganan	3:23
8.	"The Nerve"	Clem Castro	3:38
9.	"Caught In A Line"	Clem Castro	3:35
10.	"Lihim"	Clem Castro, Mcoy Fundales	6:02
11.	"Chatter's Tale"	Mcoy Fundales	2:49
12.	"Tomorrow"	Clem Castro	4:50

== Easter eggs ==
In the song "Tomorrow" when the song ends there will be silence, after that it is the beginning of the first song "Strike Whilst the Iron Is Hot", then played the reversed version of "Hanggang Kailan (Umuwi Ka Na Baby)".

== Certificates ==
Country	Certification	Sales
Philippines	2× Platinum (Diamond)	80,000+
