= The Camerawalls =

Filipino indie pop band

- Origin: Manila, Philippines
- Genres: Rock; Indie; Psychedelia
- Years active: 2007–2012; 2016–2019
- Label: Lilystars
- Spinoffs: Dragonfly Collector
- Spinoff of: Orange and Lemons; Turbo Goth; Project 1
- Past members: Clementine; Law Santiago; Bach Rudica; (see § Band members for others)
- Website: The Camerawalls

The Camerawalls is a pop rock band based in Manila, Philippines formed in 2007 by singer and guitarist Clementine, the main songwriter of the band and formerly of Orange and Lemons.

== History ==
With a cult following back in 2003 to mainstream success in 2005 via a series of hit singles through a major label, it was with the band Orange and Lemons that the breakup in 2007 resulted in the premature exit of Clementine from the music scene. This was to prove as only temporary, as Clementine immediately formed a new band in September 2007 under the name The Camerawalls, collaborating with old friends Law Santiago and Ian Sarabia.

To support The Camerawalls' releases and go as far as establishing full creative control and marketing his own music, Clementine also founded Lilystars Records, an independent record label determined to house the sensibility and aesthetics of indie pop music in the Philippines.

In March 2008, The Camerawalls released a sample of their music online with an unofficial single "Markers Of Beautiful Memories", which slowly gained attention and was eventually picked up by radio. With the release of their debut album Pocket Guide to the Otherworld on July 3, 2008, and the success of the single "Clinically Dead For 16 Hours", The Camerawalls became noted for their music production and indie spirit. Pocket Guide to the Otherworld was praised for blending contemporary indie pop and Filipino sensibilities.

The Camerawalls acquired Paolo Peralta as their session guitarist in November 2009 and later as an official member as they continued to tour.

On February 22, 2010, The Camerawalls released a digital single called "The Sight of Love" which marked an official return to the recording studios. "The Sight of Love" also features another artist from the Lilystars stable – vocalist Sarah Gaugler of electro-pop band Turbo Goth.

Two months after its release, Paolo Peralta and Ian Sarabia resigned from the band.

== Musical styles ==
The Camerawalls is renowned for incorporating native rondalla (traditional Philippine folk music) instrumentations in their recordings attributed to Clementine's exposure to his father's work as a Rondalla instructor. Prominent sections of bandurria and octavina can be heard on a number of songs especially on their remake of "Canto De Maria Clara", a Spanish poem written by Filipino writer and national hero José Rizal which appeared on the novel Noli Me Tangere (first published in 1887 in Berlin).

Some of the band's influences includes The Beatles, Morrissey, The Smiths, XTC, Belle & Sebastian, Trash Can Sinatras, The Pale Fountains, Terry Hall, and The Lightning Seeds.

== Band members ==
Principal members

- Clementine - vocals, guitars, banduria, octavina (2007–2012, 2016–2019)
- Law Santiago - bass (2007–2012, 2016–2019)
- Bach Rudica - drums, percussion (2010–2012, 2016–2019)

Early members

- Ian Sarabia - drums, percussion (2007–2010)

Regular touring/session members

- Paolo Peralta - guitars (2009–2010)
- Ian Zafra - guitars (2016–2019)

== Discography ==
- Pocket Guide to the Otherworld (CD album – July 2008, Lilystars Records)

No.	Title	Length
1.	"Markers of Beautiful Memories"
2.	"Clinically Dead for 16 Hours"
3.	"Lord of the Flies"
4.	"I Love You, Natalie"
5.	"Changing Horses Midstream"
6.	"Ignore My Weakness, Don't Ignore Me"
7.	"Canto de Maria Clara"
8.	"The Emperor, the Concubine & the Commoner"
9.	"Solitary North Star"
10.	"Lizards Hiding Under the Rocks"

- "The Sight of Love" (digital single – February 2010, Lilystars Records)
- Bread and Circuses (CD EP – December 2010, Lilystars Records)

No.	Title	Length
1.	"A Gentle Persuasion"
2.	"My Life's Arithmetic Means"
3.	"Longevity"
4.	"Birthday Wishes"
5.	"Bread and Circuses"

== Awards and nominations ==
Year	Award giving body	Category	Nominated work	Results
2008	NU Rock Awards	Best New Artist	—N/a	Nominated
2008	NU Rock Awards	Best Album Packaging	(Sarah Gaugler for "Pocket Guide to the Other World")	Nominated
