= Kami nAPO Muna Ulit =

2007 tribute album

Kami nAPO Muna ULIT

Compilation album by Various artists
- Released: 2007
- Genre: Original Pilipino Music (OPM); Pinoy rock; pop
- Length: 72:42
- Label: Universal Records

Various artists chronology
Kami nAPO Muna (2006)	Kami nAPO Muna ULIT (2007)

Kami nAPO Muna ULIT is the second tribute album to the 1970s Filipino musical group APO Hiking Society. It was released in 2007, and is a follow-up to the previous year's Kami nAPO Muna. Like the prior album, Kami nAPO Muna Ulit features covers of APO Hiking Society songs, performed by a number of Filipino bands and artists.

Within two weeks of its release, Kami nAPO Muna Ulit was certified as a gold record.

== Title and release history ==
"Kami nAPO Muna ULIT", in Filipino, literally means "It's our turn again"; the phrase also being a play on the Apo name. The APO Hiking Society itself used the word nAPO ("na po", a formal phrase meaning "already") in many of their concerts and on a noontime television show.

A two-disc limited edition set of Kami nAPO Muna ULIT has been released; it contains the original Apo Hiking Society renditions of the tribute tracks on the second disc.

== Track listing ==
All tracks are written by APO Hiking Society.

No.	Title	Artist(s)	Length
1.	"American Junk"	Kamikazee and Parokya ni Edgar	2:46
2.	"Salawikain ("Proverb")"	Mcoy Fundales of Orange and Lemons (feat. the Spaceflower Show)	4:08
3.	"Prinsesa ("Princess")"	Itchyworms	3:03
4.	"Saan na Nga Ba'ng Barkada ("Where Is the Clique")"	Sponge Cola	4:26
5.	"Tuyo Na'ng Damdamin ("The Feelings Have Dried")"	Silent Sanctuary	3:12
6.	"Wala nang Hahanapin Pa ("Can't Ask for Anything More")"	True Faith	4:10
7.	"Mahirap Magmahal ng Syota ng Iba ("It's Hard to Love Someone Else's Girlfriend")"	Hilera	2:13
8.	"Love Is for Singing"	The Bloomfields	4:04
9.	"Syotang Pa-class ("Classy Girlfriend")"	Radioactive Sago Project (feat. Raimund Marasigan)	3:57
10.	"Kaibigan ("Friend")"	Up Dharma Down	4:13
11.	"Show Me a Smile"	Imago	4:03
12.	"Isang Dangkal ("A Hand-breadth")"	Paramita	3:57
13.	"Heto Na ("Here It Comes")"	Concrete Sam	4:32
14.	"Tuloy ang Ikot ng Mundo ("The World Keeps Spinning")"	Dicta License	6:15
15.	"Hanggang May Pag-ibig ("While Love Remains")"	Chillitees	4:07
16.	"Just a Smile Away"	Shamrock	3:35
17.	"Suntok sa Buwan ("Punch at the Moon")"	Scrambled Eggs	4:23
18.	"Lumang Tugtugin ("An Old Song")"	APO All-Star	5:38
Total length:			72:42
