= Collector's Item =

Collector's Item may refer to:

- Collectable, an item that is collected
- Collector's Item (Apo Hiking Society album)
- Collector's Item (Twelfth Night album)
- Collector's Item (EP), an EP by King Diamond
- Collectors' Item: All Their Greatest Hits!, album by Harold Melvin and the Blue Notes
- Collector's Item (Babes in Toyland album), an album by Babes in Toyland
- Collector's Item (1958 TV series), a TV series that was not picked up. The pilot, "The Left Fist of David" was directed by Buzz Kulik
- The Trap (1985 film) (La gabbia), an Italian film also known as Collector's Item
- Collector's Item (play), a 1952 Broadway play featuring Erik Rhodes
- "Collector's Item" (short story), original title of Man from the South

== See also ==
- Collectors' Items, album by Miles Davis
