= When I Met You =

When I Met You may refer to:

== Films ==
- When I Met U, 2009
- Naan Avalai Sandhitha Pothu, a 2019 Indian film

== Music ==
- "When I Met You" (Fantasia song), 2016
- "When I Met You", song by Widow Maker from Widowmaker (album), 1976
- "When I Met You", song by APO Hiking Society from True to My Music, 1983
- "When I Met You", by Shane Filan from You and Me, 2013
- "When I Met You", song by David Bowie from No Plan (EP), 2016
