= The Best of Apo Hiking Society Volume 1 =

Compilation album by Apo Hiking Society
- Released: 1982
- Genre: Original Pilipino Music, Filipino Rock, Pop
- Label: Universal Records Philippines

Apo Hiking Society chronology
Twelve Years Together (1982)	''The Best of Apo Hiking Society Volume 1'' (1982)	True To My Music (1983)

The Best of Apo Hiking Society Volume 1 is the first compilation album from the Filipino musical group Apo Hiking Society. It was released in 1982 under the Universal Records Philippines. The album is composed of 14 tracks taken from their previously released studio albums.

== Track listing ==
1. "Kaibigan"
2. "Pumapatak Ang Ulan"
3. "Pag-ibig"
4. "Mahirap Magmahal Ng Syota Ng Iba"
5. "Panalangin"
6. "Batang-Bata Ka Pa"
7. "Princesa"
8. "Ewan"
9. "Kabilugan Ng Buwan"
10. "Doo Bidoo"
11. "Salawikain"
12. "Tuyo Na'ng Damdamin"
13. "American Junk"
14. "Show Me A Smile"
