= Noontime Show =

- Commercial Break Edition cover

Studio album by the Itchyworms
- Released: 11 October 2005
- Label: Universal Philippines
- Producers: The Itchyworms; Buddy Zabala; Raimund Marasigan

The Itchyworms chronology
Little Monsters Under Your Bed (2001)	Noontime Show (2005)	Self-Titled (2008)

Singles from Noontime Show
- 1. "Buwan" Released: 2005; 2. "Akin Ka Na Lang" / "Beer" Released: 2006; 3. "Love Team" Released: February 12, 2007

Noontime Show is the second studio album by the Filipino rock band the Itchyworms, released by Universal Records Philippines on 11 October 2005. A concept album, it mocks traditions of the Philippine mainstream entertainment industry, parodying long-standing elements of Philippine soap operas ("Soap o Pera"), power couples or love teams ("Love Team"), game shows ("Contestant Number One"), love-advice radio shows ("Mister Love"), etc.

== Critical reception ==
In a review for The Philippine Star, Baby A. Gil wrote: "Songs in Noontime Show are amusing, irreverent and has a lot to say about the Filipino noontime variety show on television. Think production numbers, contests, love teams, etc., etc. [...] I admit they can be sarcastic at times and the songs might not sit well with some people. But it is hard to come across albums that effectively combine nice melodies and social commentary in one package, so we might as well enjoy this one."

In 2021, music vlogger Toni Panagu released a video critique on YouTube explaining why he thought the album a work of genius.

== Aftermath ==
- At the 19th (2006) Awit Awards, "Akin Ka Na Lang" won the Best World/Alternative Music award.
- At the 2006 NU Rock Awards, the album won Album of the Year, Jazz Nicolas was named Drummer of the Year, and the band along with Raymund Marasigan and Buddy Zabala were named Producers of the Year. Nominated were "Beer" for Song of the Year, The Itchyworms for Band of the Year and the Rising Sun Award, Kelvin Yu for Bassist of the Year, and Apple Sta. Maria for Best Album Packaging.
- Jugs Jugueta later joined the ABS-CBN morning talent variety show Showtime in October 2009 as one of its original hosts. The show later moved to the noontime slot as It's Showtime in February 2012. Up to the present he is still one of the mainstays of the show which now airs across different platforms and TV channels.
- KFC, Close-Up, and Zonrox used "Akin Ka Na Lang" in their respective ads.
- In 2024, the band launched the "Beer" and "Pag-ibig" craft beer brands inspired by their song "Beer".

== Track listing ==
All tracks are written by the Itchyworms, unless otherwise specified.

Noontime Show track listing
No.	Title	Writer(s)	Length
1.	"Patnubay ng Magulang"		0:09
2.	"Theme from Noontime Show"	Chino Singson, Jugs Jugueta & Jazz Nicolas	4:42
3.	"Ka'tol"		0:18
4.	"Buwan"	Nicolas	5:08
5.	"Contestant Number One"		4:19
6.	"Akin Ka Na Lang"	Nicolas	3:03
7.	"Beer"	Nicolas	6:04
8.	"Balde o Salapi"		0:15
9.	"Salapi"	Singson, Kelvin Yu & Nicolas	3:14
10.	"One Ball"		3:43
11.	"Love Team"		5:34
12.	"Wala Nang Puwedeng Magmahal Sa 'Yo (Stalker Song)"		5:02
13.	"Mister Love"	Singson, Nicolas & Jugueta	5:18
14.	"Everybody Thinks You're Crazy"	Jugueta	4:31
15.	"Falling Star"	Nicolas	4:48
16.	"Soap o Pera"	Singson & Nicolas	4:42
17.	"Production Number"		12:18
Total length:			60:12

2006 Commercial Break Edition bonus tracks
No.	Title	Writer(s)	Length
1.	"Kabataang Pinoy"		3:46
2.	"Beer Lite"	Nicolas	6:31
3.	"Happy Happy Song"	Nicolas	2:34
4.	"Hello Moto"		4:01
5.	"Akin Ka Na Lang (Necktie Version)"	Nicolas	3:11
6.	"Buwan (Acoustic Uso Version)"	Nicolas	5:07
7.	"Buwan (Sfunky Rigor Mix / feat. Rye, Jaime Labrador & Raymund Marasigan)"	Nicolas	4:40
8.	"Grabeng Pag-Ibig (Rodel Rodrigo)"		3:53
9.	"Jackson (Deleted Scene)"	Nicolas & Singson	3:57
Total length:			37:00

== Personnel ==
Adapted from liner notes.

The Itchyworms

- Jugs Jugueta – guitars, vocals
- Jazz Nicolas – drums, vocals, percussion, keyboards, 12-string electric guitars
- Chino Singson – lead guitar, guitars, vocals
- Kelvin Yu – basses, guitars, vocals

Additional musicians

- Gabby Evangelista – extra basses

Production

- The Itchyworms, Buddy Zabala and Raymund Marasigan
