= Apo Hiking Society =

Filipino musical group

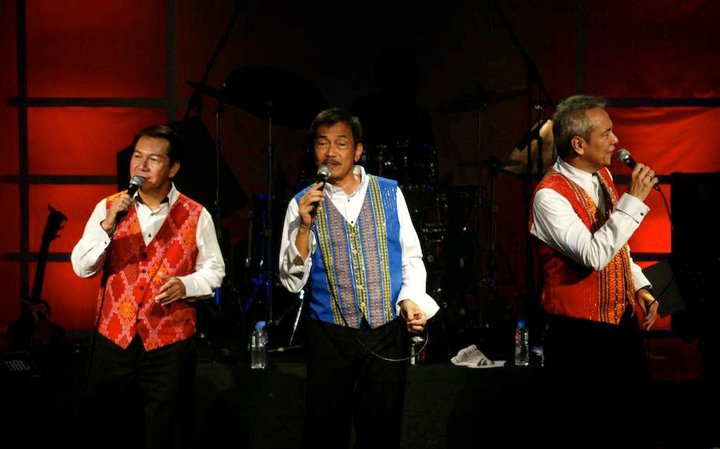
- Apo Hiking Society performing in 2010. From left: Boboy Garrovillo, Danny Javier, and Jim Paredes

Background information
- Origin: Quezon City, Philippines
- Genres: Manila sound; OPM; pop; soft rock
- Years active: 1969–present
- Labels: Vicor Music; WEA Records (Philippines); Thirdline Incorporated
- Members: Jim Paredes; Boboy Garovillo
- Past members: Kenny Barton; Doden Besa; Bruce Brown; Gus Cosio; Butch Dans; Renato Garcia; Danny Javier; Lito de Joya; Chito Kintanar; Sonny Santiago; Ric Segreto
- Website: www.apohikingsociety.org

The Apolinario Mabini Hiking Society, later popularly known as Apo Hiking Society, or simply APO, is a Filipino musical group, composed of Danny Javier, Jim Paredes, and Boboy Garrovillo. Javier died in 2022, leaving Paredes and Garrovillo as a duo.

Apo Hiking Society is regarded as one of the pillars and icons of Original Pilipino Music (OPM). The group was formed and had its beginnings in 1969 at Ateneo de Manila High School, with 12 members: Lito de Joya, Sonny Santiago, Gus Cosio, Renato Garcia, Chito Kintanar, Kenny Borton, Bruce Brown, Butch Dans, Doden Besa, Ric Segreto Macaraeg, Jim Paredes, Boboy Garrovillo, and the 13th member, Danny Javier, who joined in college. The group's name was created from the acronym AMHS representing their school, and an irreverent reference to the Philippine revolutionary intellectual and hero, Apolinario Mabini. It was later shortened to "Apo", an Ilocano term for a wise man and a Tagalog term for grandchildren, and later re-branded to "APO" (all caps). Contrary to popular belief, the "Apo" name is not a reference to the Philippines' highest peak, the potentially-active stratovolcano Mount Apo. The group's name and meaning was a joke for the fact that Mabini had been paralyzed by polio during the Philippine revolution and could not use his feet, hence the name.

As the students advanced into college, their lead vocalist, Danny Javier, joined the group. After graduation, the majority of its members left to pursue individual careers, with only three members remaining: Javier, Jim Paredes, and Boboy Garrovillo.

In the span of their professional career, APO emerged as a principal adherent to the musical movement termed Original Pilipino Music (OPM), a term coined by Javier, a milieu in which their original musical contributions and cultural influence became essential. APO became involved in record production, talent management and organizing artists under the Organisasyon ng Pilipinong Mang-aawit (OPM, translation: "Organization of Philippine Singers/musicians"). The group expanded its activities into establishing and furthering the careers of new OPM artists in the Philippines.

To date, the group has released 27 albums in the five decades of its professional existence. Two successful tribute albums were produced in 2006 and 2007 by their management group, featuring numerous young bands reinterpreting APO's expansive repertoire.

The group frequently utilized their brand name, "APO", as a clever component for Tagalog puns in titles for television shows such as their own noon-time variety shows, Sa Linggo nAPO Sila and 'Sang Linggo nAPO Sila, live programs and marketing materials, for example, as in nA PO, which transliterates as "already" (polite/formal usage).

Paredes and Garrovillo remain active in the industry and perform occasionally as a duo. In 2022, Javier died from a prolonged illness.

== Members ==
Current members

- Jim Paredes - vocals, composer (1969–present)
- Boboy Garrovillo - vocals, composer (1969–present)

Early member

- Danny Javier - lead vocals, composer (1969–2022; died 2022)

== History ==
The name "Apolinario Mabini Hiking Society" was meant to be deliberately ironic since the historical figure, Apolinario Mabini, famously lost the use of his legs to polio.

In a 2008 interview with Boy Abunda for a column in The Philippine Star, the trio also considered naming the group Jose Rizal Bulletproof Vest Company (after Philippine national hero, José Rizal), Kataas-taasang Kagalang-galangang Kombo (after Katipunan) and the Purple People.

The Apo Hiking Society first gained recognition in 1973 when they gave a farewell concert at the Meralco Theater in Pasig, Rizal, Philippines. Just out of college, the group was the talk of Ateneo de Manila University and adjoining campuses for their music and humor.

It was only when two of its four members were about to retire from the field of amateur music, however, that Apo Hiking Society, then known as the Apolinario Mabini Hiking Society, finally had a citywide audience. One of them was scheduled to leave for Turkey as an exchange student. The other had a position waiting for him in his father's advertising firm.

The trip to Turkey did not materialize and APO, now a tentative trio, pushed on steadily towards fame and fortune.

In late 1978, Apo Hiking Society nearly disbanded after Jim Paredes stormed out of a songwriting session. While asking Danny Javier for a three syllable word to fill in a line, he was provided the word "katapusan", a four syllable word. The error went unnoticed until post-recording, where an irate Paredes noticed that the word had indeed one extra syllable more than what he had originally intended.

Looking back, APO members Danny Javier and Boboy Garrovillo do not regret never having been regular wage earners. Their farewell concert, which had standing-room only audiences for two stormy nights, unexpectedly became a hit record the following year.

=== Achievements ===
In the three decades since that "farewell" concert, APO has made 22 record albums and hosted several television shows (including their own noontime Sunday show Sa Linggo nAPO Sila and noontime show from Monday to Saturday Sang Linggo nAPO Sila). They have also launched solo concerts, provincial shows, dinner shows, and corporate shows. APO has performed in over 50 cities in the United States, Canada, Singapore, Indonesia, Germany, Switzerland, Italy and Japan to bring original Pilipino music to Filipinos.

In 1978, APO was the 2nd place winner in the Metro Manila Popular Song Festival (Metropop Song Festival from 1996 to 2003) for their runner-up song "Ewan". The song was composed by Louie Ocampo.

In October 1987, during their annual US tour, APO became the first Filipino pop artists along with Marco Sison to perform in the Main Hall of New York's prestigious Carnegie Hall. They also performed at the equally prestigious Massey Hall in Toronto, Canada's music capital. Both concerts and the other shows held during that particular concert tour were sold out. APO were also the first Filipino artists to perform in a public concert in Saudi Arabia. In 1987, they were one of the first Filipino artists to be recorded on compact disc. And in 1994, they were awarded the first Dangal ng Musikang Pilipino by Awit Awards - the Filipino equivalent of the Grammy. They have also been conferred the Tanglaw Ng Lahi Award, the which was recorded by 15 Filipino artists in April 1986. A few months later the English version, "A New and Better Way", was launched in Australia. In February 1987, on the first anniversary of the Philippines' People Power revolution, the song was released in London, England. The song's lyrics are embedded on the Our Lady of Edsa shrine's wall, the symbolic center of the revolution.

In 1998, APO and the now-defunct band Eraserheads teamed up for their first San Miguel Beer TV commercial, "Homeboys". The concept of reviving and modernizing their original music by rock/alternative bands in the 1990s paved the way to two tribute albums by various bands entitled Kami nAPO Muna in 2006 and Kami nAPO Muna Ulit in 2007.

In 1999, APO was also a finalist at MetroPop Song Festival for their song finalist "Dito Sa Kanto". The song was composed by Noel Cabangon, who covered his version in 1999, then re-recorded a duet with Parokya ni Edgar vocalist Chito Miranda in 2013.

In 2007, the group along with artist Jacee was awarded the MYX Magna Award during the MYX Music Awards 2007, achieving the best OPM pop for their music and recording achievements in OPM history.

In 2009, APO was inducted into the Philippines Eastwood City Walk of Fame, recognizing their singing, hosting and acting skills.

=== APO tribute albums ===
Just a few years after their hiatus, the tribute album Kami nAPO Muna was released in honor of the group. The Filipino musical artists who did their own unique renditions of APO songs include: Imago, Orange and Lemons, Parokya ni Edgar, Kamikazee, Sandwich, Sugarfree, Itchyworms, Sponge Cola, Boldstar, Sound, Drip, Rocksteddy, Top Suzara, Barbie Almalbis, Kitchie Nadal, Shamrock, and The Dawn. Their second volume, Kami nAPO muna Ulit, has also included their new members in the compilation album: True Faith, Silent Sanctuary, Concrete Sam, Up Dharma Down, Chilitees, The Bloomfields, Scrambled Eggs, The Spaceflower Show and Hilera.

Acoustic balladeer Noel Cabangon also recorded a tribute album for the Pinoy pop musical group: Throwback: Ang Songbook Ng APO. Released in 2014 through Universal Records, it features his cover versions of various popular APO songs.

=== 2008–present: Reunions and occasional performances ===
On September 20, 2008, Apo Hiking Society had a reunion concert called "Apo of the Philippines" which was held at the Araneta Coliseum to celebrate their 39th anniversary. They sang all of the APO favorites and all songs from their past releases.

On February 7, 2009, APO performed at the Open Air FTI Complex in Taguig. The free concert was sponsored in cooperation with Taguig City Hall. One month later, the Eraserheads had their Final Set concert.

On November 17, 2009, Apo Hiking Society marked their 40th anniversary with a big concert at the SM North EDSA Skydome. It was called "APO Kayang-Kaya Pa". This was originally scheduled on September 26 but was rescheduled due to Typhoon "Ondoy" ("Ketsana").

From February 14 until the inauguration of President Benigno 'Noynoy' Aquino III on June 30, 2010, Apo Hiking Society performed a series of shows.

Apo Hiking Society remain active today, with Jim Paredes still active in singing and also as a photography hobbyist and political activist, while Boboy Garovillo has a career acting in both movies and on television.

Danny Javier created the Pidro: Ang Saplot Ng Bayan T-shirt line that would be chosen as the official shirt of the Philippine Centennial celebrations in 1998. He starred in Bangis on TV5 in 2010 and appeared in season 3 of ASOP: A Song of Praise Music Festival in 2014 as a guest judge. Javier later retired from both singing and acting. He died on October 31, 2022, due to a lingering illness.

== Musical film ==
In 2012, a movie musical based on APO songs was released. Titled I Doo Bidoobidoo, it was released on August 29. The film was inspired by Mamma Mia, a musical that was based on and used ABBA songs, which later became a movie.

== Discography ==
=== Studio albums ===
- Collector's Item (1975)
- Songwriter (1976)
- Pagkatapos ng Palabas (1978)
- Apo Hiking Society (later retitled Ten Years Together, 1980)
- Apo Hiking Society (later retitled Twelve Years Together, 1982)
- True to My Music (1983)
- Feet on the Ground (1984)
- Made in the Philippines (1985)
- Direksyon (1987)
- Mga Kuwento ng Apo (1988)
- Songbuk ng APO (1991)
- PaskonAPO (1991)
- 1-2-3 (1992)
- Barangay Apo (1993)
- Dating Alternatib (1996)
- Mismo! (1999)
- Banda Rito (2001)
- PaskonAPO Repackaged (2006)
- The Apo: Jim, Buboy and Danny (2009)

=== Live albums ===
- In Concert#$%!? (Live Album) (1974)
- The Worst of Apo Hiking Society (Live Album) (1986)
- DalawampunAPOsila (Double Live Album) (1989)

=== Compilations ===
- The Best of Apo Hiking Society, Vol. 1 (1982)
- The Best of Apo Hiking Society, Vol. 2 (1991)
- Kami nAPO muna: 2-Disc Limited Edition (2006)
- Kami nAPO muna ulit: 2-Disc Limited Edition (2007)
- The Best of Kami nAPO Muna 2-CD (2008)
- Apo Hiking Society: 18 Greatest Hits (2009)
- Kami nAPO Naman Dito Sa Canada Limited Edition (2009)

=== Collaborations ===
- The 2nd Metro Manila Pop Music Fest Album (Vicor Music Corp., 1978)
- Pamasko Ng Mga Bituin (Universal Records, 1981)
- Salubungin Ang Pasko (Universal Records, 1986)
- Handog Ng Pilipino Sa Mundo (Universal Records, 1986)
- Ginintuang Diwa ng Pasko (Universal Records, 1989)
- 18 Classic OPM Love Songs (PolyEast Records, 1995)
- Sandaan 1898-1998 (Universal Records, 1998)
- 6th Metropop Song Festival: The Album (GMA Records, 2001)
- The Love Song Collection (Universal Records, 2003)
- Only Selfless Love (Universal Records, 2003)
- OPM Gold (Universal Records, 2005)
- OPM Superstars Christmas (Universal Records, 2005)
- The Best of OPM Love Ballads (Universal Records, 2005)
- The Best of OPM Novelty Hits (Universal Records, 2005)
- OPM Gold Christmas Album (Universal Records, 2006)
- OPM Platinum Christmas (Universal Records, 2007)
- Bongga! The Biggest OPM Retro Hits of the Year (Universal Records, 2008)
- No. 1 Signature Hits OPM's Best (Vicor Music Corp., 2008)
- Senti 18 Pinoy Love Hits (Vicor Music Corp. & Viva Records, Corp., 2008)
- Pinoy Sound Trip Vol. 1 (Vicor Music Corp. & Viva Records, Corp., 2008)
- Pinoy Sound Trip Vol. 2 (Vicor Music Corp. & Viva Records, Corp., 2008)
- Bongga 2: Another Biggest OPM Retro Hits (Universal Records, 2009)
- Love Knows No Boundaries (Vicor Music Corp. & Viva Records, Corp., 2009)
- No. 1 Signature Hits OPM's Best Vol. 2 (Vicor Music Corp. & Viva Records Corp., 2009)
- Paalam, Maraming Salamat Pres. Aquino: A Memorial Tribute Soundtrack (Star Music, 2009)
- The Best of Manila Sound Vol. 1 (Vicor Music Corp., 2010)
- The Best of Manila Sound Vol. 2 (Vicor Music Corp., 2010)
- OPM All-Star Christmas (Universal Records, 2010)

=== Tribute albums ===
- Kami nAPO muna (2006)
- Kami nAPO muna ulit (2007)
- Kami nAPO Naman Dito Sa Canada (2009)
- Noel Cabangon: Throwback: Ang Songbuk ng APO (2014)

=== Songs ===
- "American Junk" (covered by Kamikazee feat. Parokya ni Edgar)
- "Anna" (covered by Top Suzara)
- "Araw"
- "Ang Nobya Kong Sexy" (original composed by Jose Mari Chan & also the same theme song of a comedy movie film title, 1975)
- "Awit ng Barkada" (covered by Itchyworms, later byNoel Cabangon)
- "Ayoko Sana"
- "Bakit ang Babae" (1976, re-released in 1991 for The Best Of APO Compilation Album covered by Sandwich)
- "Banal Na Aso, Santong Kabayo" (original by Yano)
- "Batang-Bata Ka Pa" (covered by Sugarfree, later by Noel Cabangon)
- "Bawat Bata" (covered by The Dawn, also used by Sugarfree as a jingle ad for AlactaGrow)
- "Blue Jeans" (covered by Wise Guys, then Eraserheads, and then by Rocksteddy)
- "Dito Sa Kanto" (a song finalist at the 1999 Metropop Song Festival, originally composed by Noel Cabangon, covered by Cabangon and later re-recorded by Cabangon feat. Chito Miranda)
- "Di Na Natuto" (1987; original by Gary Valenciano, originally composed by Danny Javier and covered by APO, then Sound, and then by Noel Cabangon)
- "Doo Bidoo" (covered by Kamikazee; Ogie Alcasid later covered it for the I Doo Bidoo Bidoo sountrack)
- "Ewan" (which placed second at the 1978 Metropop Song Festival, covered by Imago, later by Daniel Padilla)
- "Hanggang May Pag-Ibig" (covered by Chilitees)
- "Harana" (written by Eric Yaptangco, originally by Tony Lambino, covered by Parokya ni Edgar, Regine Velasquez and The Company)
- "Heto Na" (covered by Concrete Sam)
- "Isang Dangkal" (covered by Paramita)
- "Just a Smile Away" (original by Jaime Gatchitorena, originally composed by Danny Javier and covered by APO, Shamrock and MYMP)
- "Kabilugan ng Buwan" (covered by Drip, Noel Cabangon)
- "Kaibigan" (covered by Up Dharma Down, Noel Cabangon)
- "Kisapmata" (original by Rivermaya, covered by Yasmien Kurdi, Charice Pempengco (now Jake Zyrus) and Daniel Padilla)
- "Kumot at Unan" (covered by Boldstar Band, Richard Poon and Noel Cabangon)
- "Kung Gusto Mo, Gusto Ko Pa"
- "Love Is for Singing" (covered by The Bloomfields)
- "Lumang Tugtugin" (covered by Noel Cabangon)
- "Magasin" (original by Eraserheads, covered by Paolo Santos, Yeng Constantino and Chicosci)
- "Magkikita Rin Tayo"
- "Mamahalin Kita"
- "Mamang Kutsero" (original by National Artist Ryan Cayabyab)
- "Mahirap Magmahal ng Syota ng Iba" (covered by Hilera, KZ Tandingan and Yeng Constantino)
- "Minamahal Kong Pilipinas"
- "Nakakagigil"
- "Nakapagtataka" (original by Hadji Alejandro, covered by Susan Fuentes, Rachel Alejandro, MYMP, Sponge Cola and Noel Cabangon)
- "Paano" (covered by Shamrock; Gary Valenciano later covered it for the I Do Bidoo Bidoo soundtrack)
- "Pag-Ibig" (covered by Kitchie Nadal, Noel Cabangon; also used by Regine Velasquez as a jingle for Nestlé)
- "Paglisan" (original by Color It Red)
- "Pagsubok" (original by Orient Pearl, covered by Aiza Seguerra)
- "Panalangin" (covered by Moonstar88, Richard Poon, Daniel Padilla and Noel Cabangon)
- "Pare Ko" (original by Eraserheads, covered by Sponge Cola and later by Johnoy Danao)
- "Prinsesa" (covered by Itchyworms)
- "Pumapatak ang Ulan" (covered by Eraserheads, Parokya ni Edgar and Noel Cabangon)
- "Sa Bawat Umaga"
- "Saan Na Nga Ba'ng Barkada" (covered by Sponge Cola)
- "Salawikain" (covered by Mcoy Fundales feat. Spaceflower Show)
- "Sasaya Ang Pilipinas" (covered by various artists including Edgar Allan Guzman, Vin Abrenica, CJ Reyes and Luigi Yotoko)
- "Show Me a Smile" (1976, covered by Imago, Noel Cabangon, TNT Boys and Sharon Cuneta)
- "Softly" (debut single in 1975, re-released in 1991 for The Best Of APO Vol. 2)
- "Suntok sa Buwan" (covered by Ely Buendia, later by Scrambled Eggs)
- "Syotang Pa-Class" (covered by Radioactive Sago Project)
- "Tuloy ang Ikot ng Mundo" (covered by Dicta License)
- "Tuyo Na'ng Damdamin" (covered by Eraserheads, Silent Sanctuary and Noel Cabangon)
- "Wala Nang Hahanapin Pa" (covered by True Faith)
- "When I Met You" (covered by Jeffrey Hidalgo, Martin Nievera, Barbie Almalbis; KC Concepcion later covered it for the movie of the same name)
- "Yakap sa Dilim" (covered by Rico J. Puno, Orange & Lemons, Brownman Revival and Noel Cabangon)

==== Original Christmas songs ====
- "12 Days of Pinoy Krismas" (Filipino version of the Christmas song "Twelve Days of Christmas")
- "Ang Pasko"
- "Himig Ng Pasko" (original by The New Minstrels)
- "Lata Ang Aming Tambol"
- "Pasko Na Sinta Ko" / "Miss Kita Kung Christmas" (originally sung by Gary Valenciano and The Lightnings Band & also covered by the late Susan Fuentes)
- "Tuloy Na Tuloy Pa Rin ang Pasko" (covered by Orange & Lemons for the 2006 ABS-CBN Christmas Station ID, and Ben&Ben in 2021)
- "Pasko Na sa Mundo"

== Filmography ==
=== Films of APO ===
- Si Popeye ATBP (Sine Pilipino Productions, 1973)
- Kung Mangarap Ka't Magising (LVN Pictures, 1977; digitally restored & re-released by Star Cinema in 2016)
- Kakabakaba Ka Ba? (LVN Pictures, 1980; digitally restored & re-released by Star Cinema in 2015)
- Blue Jeans (Regal Entertainment, 1981)
- I Do Bidoo Bidoo (Studio 5 Productions, 2012)

=== Television Shows of APO ===
- Noontime Matinee (GMA 7, 1972–1975)
- Ariel Con Tina (GMA 7, 1972–1974) as guest performers
- Okay Lang (IBC 13, 1973-?) as part of cast
- Seeing Stars with Joe Quirino (IBC 13, 1975–1980)
- Penthouse Seven (GMA 7, 1976–1979)
- GMA Supershow (formerly Germside) (GMA 7, 1978–1982)
- Discorama (GMA 7, 1980–1986)- Host
- Champoy (RPN 9, 1980–1985) - guest
- Student Canteen (GMA 7, 1981–1986) as hosts
- Penthouse Live! (GMA 7, 1984–1986) as guests performers
- Superstar (RPN 9, 1984–1995) - Guest
- Saturday Entertainment (GMA 7, 1986–1995) as guest performers
- Lunch Date (GMA 7, 1986–1993) as guest performers
- Vilma On Seven (GMA 7, 1987 – 1995) as guest performers
- Ryan Ryan Musikahan (ABS-CBN, 1988–1995) as guest performers
- The Sharon Cuneta Show (IBC, 1986-1988 ABS-CBN, 1988–1997) as guest performers
- Sa Linggo nAPO Sila (ABS-CBN, 1989–1995) - Host
- Eat Bulaga! (ABS-CBN, 1990) - Guest Performer with Tito, Vic, and Joey
- Salo Salo Together (GMA 7, 1993–1995)
- Eezy Dancing (TV5, 1993–1998)
- Sang Linggo nAPO Sila (ABS-CBN, 1995–1998) as hosts
- A Little Night Of Music (GMA 7, 1995–1999) as guest performers
- ASAP Natin To "Formerly ASAP" (ABS-CBN, 1995–present) as guests
- Home Along Da Riles (ABS-CBN, 1995) as guests
- Palibhasa Lalake (ABS-CBN, 1995) as aliens from outer space
- Sang Linggo nAPO Sila (ABS-CBN, 1995–1998) as hosts
- SOP: Sobrang Okay Pare (GMA 7, 1997–2010) as guest performers
- MYX Live (MYX Channel, 2000–2010, 2020) as guest performers
- MTB: Ang Saya Saya! (ABS-CBN, 2003–2005)
- Wowowee (ABS-CBN, 2005–2010) as guest performers
- Shall We Dance (TV5, 2005–2013) as guest performers
- Ang Pinaka (GMA News TV 27, 2005–2020) as cameo guest footage
- Bubble Gang (GMA 7, 2005–2010) as guests
- Wowowillie (TV5, 2010–2011) as guest performers
- Party Pilipinas (GMA 7, 2010–2013) - guest performers
- Wiltime Bigtime (TV5, 2011–2013) - guest performers
- Its Showtime (ABS-CBN 2, 2012–present) - guest performers
- Tonight With Arnold Clavio (GMA News TV 27 "now GTV 27", 2012–2017) - guest
- Mars (GMA News TV 27 "now ¹1, 2012–2019) - guest
- The Ryza Mae Show (GMA 7, 2012–2015) - guest
- Sunday All Stars (GMA 7, 2013–2015) - guest performers
- Gandang Gabi Vice (ABS-CBN 2, 2014) - guest
- Tonight With Boy Abunda (ABS-CBN, 2015–2020)
- Sabado Badoo (GMA 7, 2015) - Cameo Footage Featured
- Wowowin (GMA 7, 2015–present) - guest performers
- Sunday PinaSaya (GMA 7, 2015–2019) - guest performers
- Magandang Buhay (ABS-CBN 2, 2017) - guest
- Studio 7 (GMA 7, 2018–2019) - guest performers
- MARS Pa More (GMA 7, 2019–2022) - guest (July 8, 2019)
- All Out Sundays (GMA 7, 2020) - guest performers
- Letters & Music (NET 25, 2020–present) - guest performers
- Happy Time (NET 25, 2020–2021) - guest performers
- Sunday Noontime Live (TV5, 2020–2021) - guest performers
- Your Face Sounds Familiar Philippines Season 3 (Kapamilya Channel & A2Z 11, 2021) - special cameo footage

== APO TV Specials ==
- UAAP Opening Ceremonies TV Special (RPN 9, 1975–1995; Studio 23 "now ABS-CBN Sports & Action Channel", 1996–2020)
- Discorama Anniversary Special (GMA 7, 1976–1978)
- GMA Supershow Anniversary Special (GMA 7, 1978–1988)
- PBA @ 10 Opening Ceremonies (RPN 9, 1985)
- PBA @ 15 Opening Ceremonies (PTV 4, 1990)
- ABS-CBN @ 40: ABS-CBN 2's 40th Anniversary TV Special (ABS-CBN 2, 1993)
- PBA @ 20 Opening Ceremonies (IBC 13, 1995)
- 50 Golden Years Along da Riles: ABS-CBN's Broadcasting Corporation's 50th Anniversary TV Special (ABS-CBN 2, 1996)
- MBA Opening Ceremonies (ABS-CBN 2 & Studio 23 "now ABS-CBN Sports & Action Channel", 1998–2001)
- Homecoming Sa 13: Isang Pasasalamat (IBC 13, 1998)
- PBA @ 25 Opening Ceremonies (IBC 13, 2000)
- GMA Gold: The GMA 7's 50th Anniversary TV Special (GMA 7, 2000)
- ABS-CBN @ 50: The ABS-CBN 2's 50th Anniversary TV Special (ABS-CBN 2, 2003)
- PBA @ 30 Opening Ceremonies (RPN 9, 2005)
- Number 1 @ 55: The GMA 7's 55th Anniversary TV Special (GMA 7, 2005)
- ABS-CBN @ 55: The ABS-CBN 2's 55th Anniversary TV Special (ABS-CBN 2, 2008
- PBA @ 35 Opening Ceremonies (9TV, 2010)
- GMA @ 60: The Heart Of Television TV Special (GMA 7, 2010)
- PBA @ 40 Opening Ceremonies (TV5 & One Sports Channel, 2015)
- Thank You Kapuso: GMA 7 @ 65th Anniversary TV Special (GMA 7, 2015)
- MBPL Season 3 Opening Ceremonies (ABS-CBN Sports & Action 23, 2017)
- GMA @ 70: GMA 70th Anniversary Virtual TV Special (GMA 7, 2020)
- Shopee 11 TV Special (GMA 7, 2020)
- Lazada Supershow TV Special (GMA 7, 2021)
- ABS CBN @ 70 TV Special (A2Z 11 & KapamiLya Channel, 2023)

== Awards and nominations ==
- Lifetime Achievement Award, Awit Awards
- Finalists, Metro Pop Song Festival 2001
- Celebrity Inductee Winner, Eastwood City Walk Of Fame, 2009
- 2nd Place Winner, Metro Manila Popular Song Festival (now Metropop Song Festival) 1979
- Nominated, Best Male TV Hosts "Sa Linggo NAPO Sila," PMPC Star Awards For TV 1989–1995
- Nominated, Best Male TV Hosts "Sang Linggo NAPO Sila," PMPC Star Awards For TV 1995–1998

Year	Award giving body	Category	Nominated work	Results
1991	Jesuits Communications Foundation, Inc	Tanglaw Ng Lahi Award	—N/a	Won
2000	Awit Awards	Best Folk/Pop Recording	"Dito Sa Kanto"	Won
2000	Awit Awards	Best Novelty Recording	"Telephone Pal"	Won
2007	MYX Music Awards	MYX Magna Award	—N/a	Won
2007	MYX Music Awards	Favorite MYX Live Performance	—N/a	Nominated
2009	Eastwood City Walk Of Fame	Celebrity Music Category Star Inductee	—N/a	Won
2009	PMPC Star Awards for Music	Lifetime Achievement Award	—N/a	Won
