= The Itchyworms =

Filipino rock band

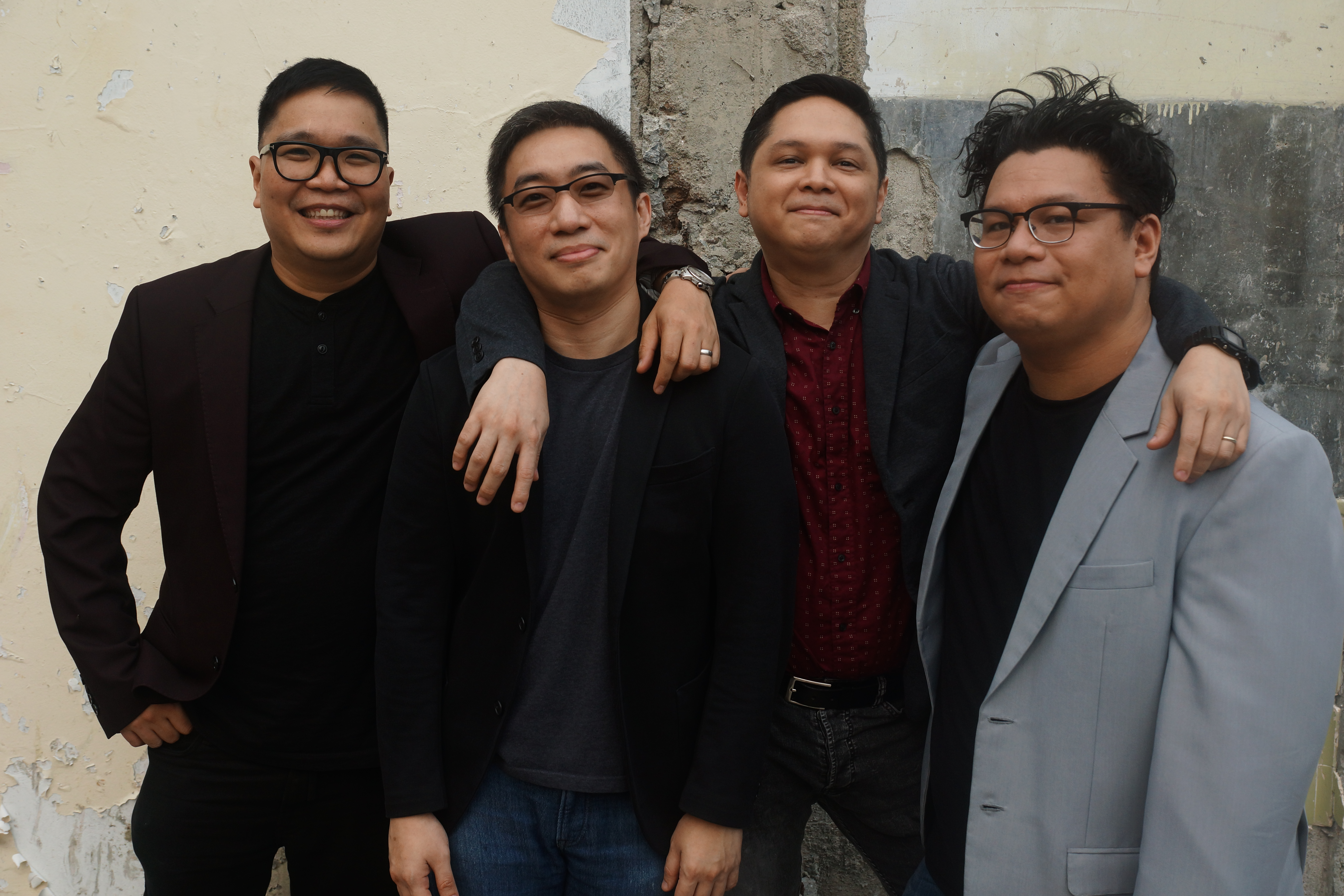
- The Itchyworms in June 2021 (taken by Eddie Boy Escudero). From left to right: Jugs Jugueta, Kelvin Yu, Chino Singson, and Jazz Nicolas

Background information
- Origin: Manila, Philippines
- Genres: Alternative rock; pop rock; power pop; Pinoy rock
- Years active: 1996–present
- Labels: Viva Records; Universal Records; Sony Music; Star Records
- Members: Jazz Nicolas; Jugs Jugueta; Kelvin Yu; Chino Singson; Weckl Mercado; Michael Vargas
- Past members: Haji Cruz; Mikey Amistoso
- Website: Official Merch Shop

The Itchyworms is a Filipino rock band, composed of Jugs Jugueta on vocals and guitar, Jazz Nicolas on vocals and drums, Kelvin Yu on bass and vocals, Chino Singson on lead guitar, Weckl Mercado on guitar and vocals and Michael Vargas on vocals, keyboard, violin, acoustic guitar, and percussion. The group made their name in the OPM (Original Pilipino Music) scene in 2006 with their second album, Noontime Show, with songs such as "Akin Ka Na Lang" and "Beer".

== History ==
=== Early years ===
Formed in 1996, the band consisted of Jazz Nicolas, Jugs Jugueta, Kelvin Yu (then on lead guitar) and Hadrian "Haji" Cruz (then on bass). The band performed at various school-based events and competitions with a handful of original songs and Beatles covers. Unfortunately, communication and scheduling issues forced Cruz to leave the group. This predicament forced Yu to take up the bass guitar vacancy, effectively making the band a trio.

The group continued as a trio until the middle of 1997, when a common friend in the Ateneo Musicians' Pool recruited Chino Singson to play guitar with the group at a school event. Singson eventually went on to become a permanent member, which solidified the group's current lineup.

In 1998, the band put together Revenge of the Unsigned as their first official CD. They did this with the help of their manager, Earnest Mangulabnan-Zabala, as well as the Eraserheads, Ely Buendia, Buddy Zabala and Romel "Sancho" Sanchez (Loquy, Cynthia Alexander). The band intended for Revenge to be their independently released debut album in the event that no major record label would sign them.

As luck would have it, then-A&R manager at Viva/Neo Records Mike Dizon (Teeth, Sandwich) got hold of Revenge. He helped push for Viva executives to sign the band and eventually release Little Monsters Under Your Bed.

Little Monsters, the band's first major-label album, was released in 2001 and contained songs from Revenge and new compositions by Nicolas and Jugueta. The song "Antipara" was probably the most well-known song on the album. The release of the album was deemed somewhat ill-timed, as its glossy pop-rock sound was an aberration in the Korn-influenced OPM Rock landscape of the late 1990s to early 2000s.

=== Noontime Show (2005) ===
On October 11, 2005, the Itchyworms released Noontime Show, which gave them modest national success and industry recognition. Buddy Zabala and Raimund Marasigan, by this time both former Eraserheads, co-produced the album with the group.

Most notably, the album went on to become Album of the Year at the 2006 NU Rock Awards, with Nicolas winning Drummer of the Year and the group winning Producer of the Year jointly with Marasigan and Zabala.

=== Commercial performances ===
The song "Akin Ka Na Lang" has been used by KFC and Close-Up in separate television advertisements. In 2008, Pringles used "Salapi" for a nationwide campaign/songwriting contest. In addition, Enervon, Close-Up and San Miguel Beer commissioned the band to write original songs for their advertising campaigns.

The band also wrote and performed "Kabataang Pinoy", the theme song for the first season of ABS-CBN's Pinoy Big Brother: Teen Edition. This is arguably the band's most widely publicized song because of the series' popularity and media exposure. They also performed the station ID "Para Sa 'yo Kapatid" of TV5.

=== Recent achievements ===
In early 2016, songwriter Davey Langit asked the band to interpret "Dalawang Letra", his entry to the Himig Handog P-Pop Love Songs competition. The song won the top prize at the finals night in April 2016. In July 2016, the band's drummer/vocalist Jazz Nicolas, with songwriting partner Wally Acolola, won the PhilPop grand prize with their composition "Di Na Muli", also performed by the Itchyworms.

In August of the same year, the band released "Pariwara", a song written in collaboration with Ely Buendia. According to Buendia, the song had been in his chest of unfinished ideas since the days of the Eraserheads. The song remained unused until early 2016, when vocalist Jugs Jugueta asked about any partial songs Buendia may have had lying around. Buendia gave the Itchyworms "Pariwara", and Jugueta and Nicolas delivered more lyrics and a new bridge. Buendia and the Itchyworms then got together at his home studio, known as the Bunker, to hash out a final arrangement.

=== Chino Singson relocation ===
In late August 2022, longtime-lead guitarist Chino Singson announced his move to Canada with his family. In a statement on Instagram, he said that he would remain a member of the band and possibly join in on gigs outside of the Philippines. Guitarists Mikey Amistoso of the band Ciudad and Weckl Mercado became part of the Itchyworms lineup in Singson's stead. In December 2022, a March–April 2023 U.S. tour was announced with Singson joining for the first time since Singson's departure concert in September 2022.

=== Mikey Amistoso relocation ===
The band announced a tour in Canada entitled "Akin Ka Na Lang Canada," in which they reunited with former lead guitarist Chino Singson. The tour also served as a farewell for member Mikey Amistoso, in which the band concurrently announced his relocation to the Toronto area. Amistoso's last concerts with the band in the Philippines were on October 8 and 18, while he finally closed out his tenure in Canada on November 10 in Toronto. According to his LinkedIn page, he is no longer an active musician for the Itchyworms.

In the following year, Michael Vargas replaced Amistoso as the new keyboardist.

== Influences ==
The different members of the group are all influenced from different styles and eras of music, be it Jazz Nicholas' taste for more avant-garde soundscapes, Kelvin Yu's appreciation of R'n'B, hip-hop and even Elvis Presley, Chino Singson's preference for guitar-centred rock, or even Jugs Jugueta being into a more 60s sound, more specifically Paul McCartney's solo career during that time.

Although the individual members of the band draw on distinct influences, their common affection for The Beatles, Eraserheads and 60s pop sensitivities as a whole heavily defines the quartet's musical sound.

== Discography ==
To date the Itchyworms have released five full-length studio albums and one EP. They have also contributed songs to numerous compilations, most notably including the Kami nAPO Muna and Kami nAPO Muna Ulit tribute albums. In 2014 they launched their fourth full-length studio album, After All This Time. This new deluxe edition of the album contains six bonus tracks aside from the ten main tracks. These include the current single "Ayokong Tumanda", the title track "After All This Time", and a remake of the classic Juan de la Cruz song "Panahon".

=== Studio albums ===
- Little Monsters Under Your Bed (Viva/Neo Records, 2001)
- Noontime Show (Universal Records, 2005)
- Self-Titled (Sony BMG Philippines, July 8, 2008)
- After All This Time (Independently released, 2013)
- Waiting for the End to Start (Sony Music Philippines, 2020)
- Christmas Starts When The Bers Begin (Sony Music Philippines, 2024)

=== EPs ===
- And the Worm Jumped Over the Moon (Independently released, 2003)
- After All This Time (Independently released, 2013)
- Christmas Starts When The Bers Begin EP release (Sony Music Philippines, 2022)

=== Anthology album appearances ===
- "Happy House" - Songs from NU107 In The Raw (Sony Music, 1998, also re-recorded for Little Monsters Under Your Bed)
- Pulp Freakshow (Viva/Neo Records, 2001)
- Gimik Nation (Viva/Neo Records, 2002)
- "Awit Ng Barkada" - Kami nAPO Muna (Universal Records, 2006)
- "Season Of Smiles" - Close-Up Season of Smiles Christmas CD (Universal Records, 2006)
- Astig...The Biggest Band Hits (Universal Records, 2006)
- AYUZ! Pinoy Alternative's Power Cuts (Viva/Neo Records, 2006)
- SUPER - The Biggest OPM Hits Of The Year (Universal Records, 2007)
- "Princesa" - Kami nAPO Muna Ulit (Universal Records, 2007)
- "Kabataang Pinoy" - Musika Sa Bahay Ni Kuya: The Best Of Pinoy Big Brother Hits (Star Music, 2008)
- Gusto Ko Ng Rock (Sony Music, 2009)
- I-Star 15: The Best of Inspirational Songs (Star Music, 2010)
- "Maling Akala" - The Reunion: An Eraserheads Tribute Album (Star Music, 2012)
- "Dalawang Letra" by Davey Langit - Himig Handog P-Pop Love Songs 2016 The Album (Star Music, 2016)
- Super Astig Hits (Universal Records, 2016)

=== Singles ===
- "Antipara" (2001)
- "Buwan" (2005)
- "Akin Ka Na Lang" (2006, not to be confused with Morissette Amon's song of the same name)
- "Beer" (2006)
- "Awit ng Barkada" (Original by APO, 2006)
- "Kabataang Pinoy" (Pinoy Big Brother Teen Edition Theme, 2006)
- "Salapi" (2006)
- "Love Team" (2007)
- "Princesa" (Original by APO, 2007)
- "Penge Naman Ako N'yan" (2008)
- "Freak-Out, Baby" (2009)
- "Gusto Ko Lamang Sa Buhay" (Mutya ng Masa Theme/When I Met U soundtrack, 2009)
- "Misis Fely Nimfa Ang Pangalan" (2009)
- "Suplado Ka Pala sa Personal" (With Kelvin Yu on lead vocals, 2010)
- "Gaano Ko Ikaw Kamahal" (2011)
- "Maling Akala" (Original by Eraserheads, 2012)
- "After All This Time" (2013)
- "Ayokong Tumanda" (2013)
- "Huwag Na Sana 'kong Gumising Mag-isa" (2014)
- "In Love Ako Sa'yo" (2015)
- "Panahon" (Featuring Pepe Smith, 2015)
- "Rainy Day" (2015)
- "Dalawang Letra" (2016, Grand Winner of Himig Handog P-Pop Love Songs 2016)
- "'Di Na Muli" (2016)
- "Pariwara" (Featuring Ely Buendia, 2016)
- "Lutang" (Featuring Ely Buendia, 2017)
- "Sisikat Muli Ang Araw" (2017)
- "Loco" (2018)
- "我真不想变老 - Wo zhen bu xiang bian lao" (Chinese version of "Ayokong Tumanda", 2019)
- "Ang Ating Tagumpay" (with Sponge Cola) (2019)
- "Malinaw Na Malabo Na Tayo" (Featuring Ely Buendia, 2019)
- "Armageddon Blues" (2020)
- "The Silence" (2020)
- "I-Boogie Mo Ako Baby" (Featuring The CompanY, 2020)
- "Same Day" (2020)
- "The Life I Know" (2020)
- "After All This Time (Under the Weather Version) (2020)
- "Out of Time" (2020)
- "Sisikat Muli Ang Araw (Acoustic version)" (2020)
- "Eto Na (Ang Maliligayang Araw)" (2021)
- "Panic in My Mind" (2023)
- "The Morning After" (2023)
- "Bakit Hindi Ka Crush Ng Crush Mo" (Zia Quizon cover, with Chino Singson on lead guitar, 2024)

== Band members ==
Current members

- Johann "Jazz" Nicolas – lead vocals, drums, piano, keyboards, keytar (1996–present)
- Eric "Jugs" Jugueta – co-lead vocals, rhythm guitar, percussion, keyboards (1996–present)
- Kelvin Yu – bass guitar, backing vocals (1997–present); lead guitar (1996-1997)
- Julian "Chino" Singson III – lead guitar, backing vocals (1997–present, on hiatus since 2022)
- Weckl Mercado – co-lead guitar, backing vocals (2022–present)
- Michael Vargas - keyboards, guitar, violin, backing vocals (2025-present)

Former members

- Haji Cruz – bass guitar, backing vocals (1996–1997)
- Mikey Amistoso – co-lead guitar, keyboards, backing vocals, tambourine (2022–2024)

== Other projects ==
Itchyworms lead singer Jugs Jugueta is also a TV noontime host and comedian on It's Showtime on ABS-CBN 2. He has also guested in various TV shows on Channel 2 including Matanglawin, Panahon Ko To, I Can See Your Voice, "ASAP Natin To", Minute To Win It Last Man Standing and has been seen on Kapamilya Deal Or No Deal. Jugueta has also guested in Maynila on GMA Channel 7 where The Itchyworms also performed. Jugueta, together with his longtime best friend Rocksteddy frontman Teddy Corpuz, was also an actor in a Holy Week Lenten drama special on It's Showtime that was held every Holy Week of every year from 2013 to 2016.. In 2019, Jugueta and Corpuz hosted a Lenten documentary special of It's Showtime instead of their traditional Lenten drama special.

Jazz Nicolas also guested on MYX Olympics, a popular quiz show on MYX Channel in 2016.

== Awards and nominations ==
Year	Award giving body	Category	Nominated work	Results
2001	NU Rock Awards	Best New Artist	—N/a	Won
2006	NU Rock Awards	Drummer of the Year	Jazz Nicolas	Won
2006	NU Rock Awards	Rising Sun Award	—N/a	Won
2006	NU Rock Awards	Album of the Year	Noontime Show	Won
2006	NU Rock Awards	Producer of the Year	with Raimund Marasigan and Buddy Zabala for Noontime Show	Won
2006	NU Rock Awards	Bassist of the Year	Kelvin Yu	Nominated
2006	NU Rock Awards	Song of the Year	"Beer"	Nominated
2006	NU Rock Awards	Artist/ Band of the Year	—N/a	Nominated
2006	NU Rock Awards	Best Album Packaging	Apple Sta. Maria for Noontime Show	Nominated
2007	NU Rock Awards	Best Music Video	"Loveteam"	Nominated
2008	NU Rock Awards	Guitarist of the Year	Chino Singson	Nominated
2008	NU Rock Awards	Drummer of the Year	Jazz Nicolas	Nominated
2008	NU Rock Awards	Best Live Act	—N/a	Nominated
2009	NU Rock Awards	Song of the Year	"Gusto Ko Lamang Sa Buhay"	Nominated
2010	NU Rock Awards	Song of the Year	"Suplado Ka Pala sa Personal"	Nominated

Awards
Preceded by Slapshock	NU Rock Awards; Best New Artist; 2001	Succeeded by Boldstar
