= Songwriter (Apo Hiking Society album) =

Studio album by APO Hiking Society
- Released: 1976
- Recorded: 1976
- Studio: Cinema Audio & Sampaguita Studios
- Genre: Original Pilipino Music; Filipino Rock; Pop
- Label: JEM/Telesis Records
- Producer: The Apo Hiking Society; Willy Cruz

APO Hiking Society chronology
Collector's Item (1975)	Songwriter (1976)	Pagkatapos Ng Palabas (1978)

Songwriter is the second studio album of the Filipino trio Apo Hiking Society. It was released in 1976 under JEM Records label.

== Track listing ==
All selections licensed by APO Music Philippines (AMP).

Side A

1. "Love Is for Singing" (Jim Paredes) - arranged by Willy Cruz, backing vocals by Bong Agcaoili, Quito Colayco, The Black Forest, The Quirno Sisters
2. "Tell Me Why" (Danny Javier) - arranged by Eddie Munji
3. "Mahirap Magmahal ng Syota ng Iba" (Jim Paredes) - arranged by Eddie Munji
4. "A Song for You" (Boboy Garrovillo, Bong Agcaoili) - arranged by The APO, Willy Cruz
5. "We're Together" (Jim Paredes) - arranged by Willy Cruz
6. "Bluebirds" (C. Javier, Danny Javier) - arranged by Toti Fuentes

Side B

1. "Evening Show" (Jim Paredes) - arranged by Eddie Munji
2. "Show Me a Smile" (Danny Javier) - arranged by Willy Cruz
3. "Restless People" (Boboy Garrovillo) - arranged by Toti Fuentes
4. "I Keep Rememb'ring" (Jim Paredes) - arranged and backing vocals by Quito Colayco
5. "Those Were the Good Ole' Days" (Danny Javier) - arranged by The APO, Willy Cruz

== Credits ==
According to the album's credits.

- Eddie Munji, Johnny Gonzalves, Roger Herrera – bass
- Jun Regalado, Lito Toribio – drums
- Boboy Garrovillo, Eddie Munji, Jim Paredes – electric guitar
- Boy Tanquintic, Dindo Aldecoa, Jess Payumo, Jun Orenza – recording engineers
- Amado Triviño, Quito Colayco, Toti Fuentes, Willy Cruz – keyboards
- Bert Moreno – recording assistant
- The Apo Hiking Society, Willy Cruz – producer
