= Dating Alternatib =

Studio album by APO Hiking Society
- Released: 1996
- Genre: Original Pilipino Music, Filipino rock, pop
- Label: Universal Records, Philippines

APO Hiking Society chronology
| Barangay Apo (1994) | ''Dating Alternatib'' (1996) | Mismo! (1999) |

Dating Alternatib is the fifteenth studio album of the Filipino trio Apo Hiking Society. It's an 8-track album released in 1996 under Universal Records.

== Track listing ==
1. Kayod, Kayod (3:11)
2. Kailan Mo Ako Pagbibigyan (3:18)
3. Adik Sa 'yo (4:42)
4. Dedmahan (Nakaw Na Sandali) (4:08)
5. Malungkot Na Balita (4:02)
6. Trapik Tralala (4:09)
7. Tanggapin Mo Kung Gusto Mo (3:01)
8. Paalam (2:47)

== Related links ==
- The Official Apo Hiking Society Website
