= The Best of Apo Hiking Society Volume 2 =

Compilation album by Apo Hiking Society
- Released: 1991
- Genre: Original Pilipino Music, Filipino rock, pop
- Label: Universal Records Philippines

Apo Hiking Society chronology
Songbuk ng APO (1991)	''The Best of Apo Hiking Society Volume 2'' (1991)	PaskonAPO (1991)

The Best of Apo Hiking Society Volume 2 is a compilation album from the Filipino musical group Apo Hiking Society. It was released in 1991 under the Universal Records Philippines. The album is composed of 15 tracks taken from their previously released studio albums.

== Track listing ==
1. "Awit Ng Barkada"
2. "When I Met You"
3. "Lumang Tugtugin"
4. "Love Is For Singing"
5. "Huwag Masanay Sa Pagmamahal"
6. "Di Na Natuto"
7. "Yakap Sa Dilim"
8. "Bakit Ang Babae"
9. "Blue Jeans"
10. "Bawat Bata"
11. "Anna"
12. "Syotang Pa-Class"
13. "Nakapagtataka"
14. "Softly"
15. "Kumot At Unan"
