= The Worst of Apo Hiking Society =

1985 live album by Apo Hiking Society

Live album by Apo Hiking Society
- Released: 1986
- Recorded: 30 November 1985
- Genres: Original Pilipino Music (OPM); Pinoy rock; pop
- Label: WEA Records (Philippines)
- Producers: Apo Hiking Society and ApogENT; Ramon Chuaying (executive producer)

Apo Hiking Society chronology
Made in the Philippines (1985)	The Worst of Apo Hiking Society (1986)	Direksyon (1987)

The Worst of Apo Hiking Society is the second live album by the Filipino musical trio Apo Hiking Society. It was recorded on 30 November 1985 at a concert titled EtonAPOsila, held at the ULTRA.

== Track listing ==
Side one

1. "Ligawan Medley" (Includes: "Ewan", "Panalangin" & "Kabilugan ng Buwan") 4:41
2. "Yesterday-Do-Re-Mi Medley" 4:13
3. "1-2-3" 3:23
4. "Group and Its Music" (Includes: "Doobidoo", "Mahirap Magmahal ng Syota ng Iba", "Pumapatak ang Ulan", "Batang-bata Ka Pa", "Tuyo Na'ng Damdamin") 9:11

Side two

1. "Friends in Music" 3:17
2. "Salawikain" (Classical Version) 5:20
3. "American Junk" (Concert Version) 9:21
4. "Mr. T (For Tagalog) Medley" (Includes: "Pag-ibig, Masdan ang Ginawa Mo", "Dahil Sa 'Yo", "Dalagang Pilipina", "Bulong-bulungan", "Ang Tangi Kong Pag-ibig", "Silayan", "Beh Buti Nga") 5:56

== Credits ==
According to the album's credits.

- Apo Hiking Society and ApogENT – producers
- Ramon Chuaying – executive producer
- Bobby Lumba – album cover & back photo
- Mandy Cabral – album design
