= Songbuk ng Apo =

Songbuk ng APO

Studio album by Apo Hiking Society
- Released: 1991
- Recorded: 1990–1991
- Genre: Original Pilipino Music, Filipino rock, pop
- Label: Universal Records, Philippines

Apo Hiking Society chronology
DalawampunAPOsila (1989)	''Songbuk ng APO'' (1991)	The Best of Apo Hiking Society Volume 2 (1991)

Songbuk ng APO is the eleventh studio album by the Filipino trio Apo Hiking Society, released in early 1991 under Universal Records. This album includes the hits "Saan Na Nga Ba'ng Barkada" and "Paano?".

== Track listing ==
1. "Saan Na Nga Ba'ng Barkada"
2. "Kailangang Malaman Mo"
3. "Maasahan Mo Ako"
4. "Di Ba?"
5. "Sabado Na Pare Ko"
6. "Labag sa Batas"
7. "Paano?"
8. "Huli Mo"
9. "Kung Gusto Mo, Gusto Ko Pa"
10. "Nasaan Na?"
11. "Minamahal Kong Pilipinas"
