= Imago (band) =

Filipino rock band

- Origin: Quezon City, Philippines
- Genres: Alternative rock; OPM; Pinoy rock; pop rock
- Years active: 1997–present
- Labels: Viva Records; Universal Records Philippines; Soupstar Entertainment; EMI/PolyEast Records
- Members: Kharren Granada; Myrene Academia; Tim Cacho; Mervin Panganiban
- Past members: Aia de Leon; Mayumi Gomez; Kiara San Luis; Michelle Pritchard; Arvin Gatmaitan; Zach Lucero

Imago is a Filipino rock band composed of Kharren "Kurei" Granada (vocals), Myrene "Maps" Academia (bass), Tim Cacho (guitar), and Mervin Panganiban (drums).

== History ==
Imago was formed in 1997 with Aia de Leon on vocals and rhythm guitar, Tim Cacho on lead guitar, Arvin Gatmaitan on bass and backup vocals, Zach Lucero on drums and London-born Michelle Pritchard on violin. After their tribal-sounding track entitled "Rainsong" spent considerable time being played on NU107's In the Raw, a program for independent bands in the country, it eventually graduated into the station's mainstream playlist. They then signed a recording contract with Viva Records and recorded their debut album entitled Probably Not But Most Definitely, produced by Bob Aves and Grace Nono. The album was released on June 27, 2001, and included 19 tracks, which included their pre-album songs like "Rainsong" and "Alay" as well as an electronica remix of "Rainsong" by friend and musician (former Eraserheads drummer) Raimund Marasigan under the Squid 9 nom de musique. The album was highly regarded by the alternative industry for their courage to take on a Celtic/World Music feel in their music rather than the rap-growl (fondly known as "Hupaw" by most music critics) scene that was growing at the time, as well as the poetic approach to their lyrics.

The band won Katha and NU107 Rock Awards (Best Female Award for Aia De Leon and Best Music Video for "Akap") from the first CD. All this while maintaining a consistent public presence around Metro Manila, playing in various venues with other bands in the lineup as well as part of various production events such as Admit One and Sunday Grabe Sunday. During this time, Aia also joined the all-girl alt-pop band Fatal Posporos, as a bassist, replacing their original member Annette Ortiz who left for the United States and where she joined the newly reformed Filipino band, Prettier Than Pink.

Around this period, bassist Arvin Gatmaitan and violinist Michelle Pritchard left the band. Gatmaitan played with progressive metal band Eternal Now and went into the English training business, alongside teaching stringed instruments (bass, guitar, ukulele) at the British School Manila. Pritchard pursued race car driving and became a regular competitor in the Philippine motorsports scene. Pritchard also hosted the NBC TV show, Auto Review and was associate editor for C! Magazine. Pritchard later returned to London. Pritchard's signature Celtic-influenced violin strokes were missed by many early fans as Imago's sound morphed into mainstream pop shortly after Myrene Academia, former NU107 DJ and Sandwich bassist joined the band.

Imago's second album was released 2 years after, though they had been playing most of their new material during gigs. Recorded in 2003, the CD's release was delayed by unexpected record label setbacks and was thus titled Take 2 in reference to the band's second attempt in releasing an album. The material is relatively heavier compared to the first album, trading in the ethereal-cum-New-Age sensibilities with a modern pop-rock flavor, even incorporating rap along with the staccato-type of singing they had been known for. Released independently, Take 2 featured hit songs such as "Akap" and "Anino".^{[2]} Take 2 produced the new sound and gave the band a wider audience, having been played in some mainstream CHR (Current Hit Radio) format stations. "Taning" was also included in the soundtrack to the Peque Gallaga comeback experimental film, Pinoy Blonde.

In 2006, Imago released their third album, Blush, under Universal Records. Its lead single "Taralets" was a hit on radio and music video channels in 2006. The song was also used as a theme song for the movie Pitong Dalagita and as a campaign jingle for a Philippine senatorial candidate. In the same year, they recorded a revival of "Ewan" by the APO Hiking Society. In 2007, they earned a nomination for Favorite Artist in the 2007 MYX Music Awards. "Sundo" was released as the second single for Blush. The music video was directed by Marie Jamora, who also directed the music videos for Akap and Taralets.

After the success of the third single "Walang Misteryo", their fourth single, entitled "Under Repair" was released. The video for "Under Repair" features the band impersonating ABBA.

"Blush" was certified Gold Record in the Philippines in January 2008, for reaching 15,000 copies, shortly after the release of the album's Special Edition CD.

In March 2008, the band performed with other international acts at the annual Mosaic Music Festival in Singapore. Aia de Leon sang a duet with Broken Social Scene's Kevin Drew at the festival.

In 2010, Imago released its fourth album entitled "Effect Desired None" with "Huling Yakap Ng Mundo" as the lead single.

In April 2013, lead vocalist Aia de Leon left the band. On September 13, it was announced that Mayumi Gomez would be the band's new lead vocalist.

On June 25, 2014, Imago released its Kapit album. With 8 tracks on the album, Imago fans recognized the familiar sound of the group they were accustomed to. The album is produced by Raimund Marasigan of Sandwich and Eraserheads.

== Band members ==
=== Current members ===
- Tim Cacho – lead guitar (1997–present)
- Myrene "Maps" Academia – bass guitar, backing vocals (2003–present)
- Mervin Panganiban – drums and percussion (2013–present)
- Kharren "Kurei" Granada – lead vocals (2022–present)

=== Former members ===
- Michelle Pritchard – violin (1997–2002)
- Arvin Gatmaitan – bass guitar, backing vocals (1997–2003)
- Aia de Leon – lead vocals, guitar (1997–2013)
- Zach Lucero – lead and rhythm guitar, backing vocals, occasional and former full-time drums and percussion (1997–2025)
- Mayumi Gomez – lead vocals, keyboards (2013–2019)
- Kiara San Luis – lead vocals, guitar (2019–2022)

== Discography ==
=== Probably Not But Most Definitely (2001) ===
1. Pretty me
2. Pauna
3. Rainsong
4. Bathala
5. The Box
6. Tugon
7. Hiwaga
8. On Shadows & Tendencies
9. Do
10. Alay
11. Salitoo
12. Otherwise
13. Idlip
14. Salitree
15. Unwed
16. Wishlist
17. Laya
18. 18
19. (Bonus Track) Rainsong Remix

=== Take 2 (2004) ===
1. Freefall
2. Phoenix
3. Akap
4. Bihag
5. Taning
6. Anino
7. Reset
8. Gratitude
9. One Way
10. Soft Return
11. Rush
12. Roasted Anino Mix (Bonus track)
13. Preset/Reset (Bonus track)
14. Taning/Mahal kong Kalaguyo (Bonus track)
15. Taning/Ipagpatuloy ang Kasalanan (Bonus track)

=== Blush (2007) ===
1. Zelo
2. Lula
3. "Sundo"
4. Under Repair
5. Highway
6. Lights Out
7. Last Dance
8. Closer
9. "Taralets"
10. Walang Misteryo
11. So Be It
12. S.R.O

=== Effect Desired None (2010) ===
1. Bawal
2. Ang Huling Yakap Ng Mundo
3. Sutil
4. Sa Ngalan Mo
5. Yahoo
6. Effects Desired None
7. Premonition
8. Can I
9. Sagad
10. Spare Change Glitter

=== Kapit (2015) ===
1. Kapit
2. Nagkalimutan
3. Then was Forever
4. Summer Baby
5. Sa Wala
6. Malaya
7. Then Was Forever (Remix)
8. Kapit (Remix)

=== Miscellaneous ===
1. Spoliarium - Ultraelectromagneticjam!: The Music Of The Eraserheads
2. Ewan - Kami nAPO Muna
3. Let It Snow - Close Up Season of Smiles
4. Umagang Kay Ganda - Theme Song for ABS-CBN's "Umagang Kay Ganda" morning program
5. Love is in my hair (OST for the CineMalaya Film entry PISAY)
6. Show Me Your Smile - Kami nAPO Muna Ulit
7. Taralets - Theme Song for Pitong Dalagita
8. Blue Kiss (song) - Cover song (Promotional Purposes only)

=== Collaborations of Imago ===
- Ultraelectromagneticjam!: The Music Of The Eraserheads (Sony BMG Music Philippines, 2005)
- ROK ON! (Viva Records, 2005)
- Kami nAPO Muna (Universal Records, 2006)
- Super! The Biggest Opm Hits Of The Year (Universal Records, 2006)
- Pinoy Ako 2 (Star Music, 2006)
- Kami nAPO Muna Ulit (Universal Records, 2007)
- The OPM Love Album (Universal Records, 2008)
- Super Astig Hits (Universal Records, 2016)

== Awards and nominations ==
Year	Award giving body	Category	Nominated work	Results
2001	NU Rock Awards	Vocalist of the Year	(for Aia de Leon)	Won
2001	NU Rock Awards	Drummer of the Year	(for Zach Lucero)	Won
2001	NU Rock Awards	Best New Artist	—N/a	Nominated
2001	NU Rock Awards	Album of the Year	"Probably Not But Most Definitely"	Nominated
2003	MTV Pilipinas Music Award	Favorite New Artist	(for "Idlip")	Nominated
2003	MTV Pilipinas Music Award	Favorite Song	"Idlip"	Nominated
2003	MTV Pilipinas Music Award	Favorite Group	"Idlip"	Nominated
2003	MTV Pilipinas Music Award	Video of the Year	"Idlip"	Nominated
2005	NU Rock Awards	Best Female Award	(for Aia de Leon)	Won
2005	NU Rock Awards	Music Video of the Year	"Akap"	Won
2005	NU Rock Awards	Vocalist of the Year	(for Aia de Leon)	Nominated
2005	NU Rock Awards	Rising Sun Award	—N/a	Nominated
2005	NU Rock Awards	Song of the Year	"Akap"	Nominated
2005	NU Rock Awards	Best Female Award	(for Myrene Academia)	Nominated
2005	NU Rock Awards	Album of the Year	"Take 2"	Nominated
2005	NU Rock Awards	Artist of the Year	—N/a	Nominated
2006	MYX Music Awards	Favorite Indie Artist	—N/a	Nominated
2006	NU Rock Awards	Bassist of the Year	(for Myrene Academia)	Won
2006	NU Rock Awards	Vocalist of the Year	(for Aia de Leon)	Nominated
2006	NU Rock Awards	Best Live Act	—N/a	Nominated
2006	NU Rock Awards	Best Female Award	(for Aia de Leon)	Nominated
2006	NU Rock Awards	Best Album Packaging	Electrolychee.com for "Blush"	Nominated
2007	MYX Music Awards	Favorite Artist	—N/a	Nominated
2007	NU Rock Awards	Song of the Year	"Sundo"	Nominated
2007	NU Rock Awards	Best Music Video	"Sundo"	Nominated
2008	MYX Music Awards	Favorite Music Video	"Sundo"	Nominated
