= True to My Music =

Studio album by APO Hiking Society
- Released: 1983
- Recorded: 1982–1983
- Genre: OPM; pop; soft rock
- Length: 35:19
- Label: Universal Records, Philippines

APO Hiking Society chronology
The Best of Apo Hiking Society Volume 1 (1982)	''True to My Music'' (1983)	Feet On The Ground (1984)

True to My Music is the sixth studio album of the Filipino trio Apo Hiking Society. It is a 10-track album released in 1983 under Universal Records.

== Track listing ==
1. "True to My Music" - 03:21
2. "When I Met You" - 4:19
3. "Kung May Problema" - 03:30
4. "Hiwaga" - 03:16
5. "Oh Mahal Ko" - 03:23
6. "Yakap sa Dilim" - 03:01
7. "Words" - 03:46
8. "Still Hung Up on You" - 03:54
9. "Kumot at Unan" - 03:46
10. "Dream of Me" - 3:03

== Related links ==
- The Official Apo Hiking Society Website
