= Sarah Gaugler =

American singer

Sarah Gaugler is a Filipino-American tattoo artist, visual artist, designer, illustrator, model, actress and musician. She is best known for her signature line art and being the singer of the electronic rock duo Turbo Goth.

== Career ==
=== Visual artist ===
Gaugler majored in Advertising at the University of Santo Tomas, where she graduated with honors receiving a bachelor's degree in Fine Arts and Design. As a student, she quickly made her mark in the Filipino art industry. She illustrated and designed the artwork for the Filipino pop rock band Orange and Lemons' last studio album, Moonlane Gardens. The album art went on to win her the NU Rock Awards for Best Album Packaging Design in 2007, and then The Awit Awards in 2008 for the same category.

=== Exhibitor ===
Gaugler’s artworks have been exhibited in the Philippines through many group shows. She has been featured in galleries such as Gallery Big, Gallery 9, Rockwell, and Robinson’s Galleria. Her first solo show was in 2011 called 'Dead Lines and Tattoo Designs'. The show was a success and it paved the way for her first major exhibition in 2012 called 'Condemnant Quod Non Intellegunt' at The Crucible Gallery, Megamall.

=== Tattooist ===
Gaugler is currently a professional tattoo artist in New York City. She began tattooing in 2008. Her distinct line art style and custom designs helped her build a steady clientele including many Filipino celebrities. In 2012, she opened her shop Snow Tattoo in Manila, and in 2015 the shop moved to the Chelsea neighborhood in Manhattan. She was one of the judges at the Philippine tattoo competition, 'Tatularan 3' in 2012. In 2014, Spot.ph ranked Snow Tattoo one of the top ten tattoo shops in the Philippines.

=== Modeling ===
Gaugler’s modeling career began organically after she was featured in one of the Philippine’s national newspapers, The Philippine Daily Inquirer as an up-and-coming artist in 2007. The photo for the feature caught the eye of a photographer and stylist team and she was hired for her first photo shoot. As Gaugler was featured in more articles for her tattooing and art, more modeling requests would follow. Gaugler has been on the cover of UNO magazine in December 2009 and CLAVEL magazine in 2012. She has also been featured in numerous Philippine newspapers (Inquirer, Manila Bulletin, The Philippine Star), fashion and art magazines (Preview, Cosmopolitan, Status, Rogue Magazine), and other publications. She has been featured on billboards and print advertisements for Nestle Yogurt, Great Taste Coffee, Silverworks and Globe Tattoo Broadband.

=== Acting ===
Gaugler has made several appearances on TV. She became one of the finalists of the MYX VJ Search 2009 and participated in the online MTV Asia VJ Hunt in 2010. She has also dipped into acting for indie films like The Erotic Man in 2010 directed by Jørgen Leth, The Diplomat Hotel in 2012 directed by Chris Ad Castillo, Bakit Hindi Ka Crush ng Crush Mo? in 2013 directed by Joyce Bernal, and Gemini in 2014, directed by Ato Bautista. She has done modeling for several music videos of bands and local artists since 2007, as well as several television commercials.

=== Musician ===
Apart from her visual arts and passion for tattooing, Gaugler is also the vocalist of the electronic rock duo Turbo Goth which formed in 2008. The duo performed at South by Southwest (SXSW) 2014 in Austin, Texas, and the 2015 CMJ Music Marathon in New York.
