= Made in the Philippines =

Studio album by APO Hiking Society
- Released: 1985
- Genres: Original Pilipino Music, Filipino rock, pop
- Labels: Universal Records, Philippines

APO Hiking Society chronology
Feet on the Ground (1984)	''Made in the Philippines'' (1985)	The Worst of APO Hiking Society (1986)

Made in the Philippines is the eighth studio album from Filipino trio Apo Hiking Society. It was released in 1985 by Universal Records.

== Track listing ==
1. American Junk (3:40)
2. After Tonight (3:59)
3. Nakakagigil (4:38)
4. You and I (3:20)
5. Tuloy Ang Ikot Ng Mundo (3:36)
6. The Crazy One (4:19)
7. Oh You (3:25)
8. Song For A Friend (4:49)
9. You're Leaving Me For Someone (3:20)
10. Inday (3:49)

== Related links ==
- The Official Apo Hiking Society Website
