= Paghilom =

Studio album by Dicta License
- Released: September 21, 2005
- Genres: Nu metal; alternative metal; rap metal
- Length: 36:42
- Label: Warner Music Philippines
- Producer: Jorel Corpus

Singles from Paghilom
- 1. "Ang Ating Araw" Released: July 4, 2005; 2. "Alay Sa Nagkamalay Sa Dekada Nobenta" Released: November 21, 2005; 3. "Complex" Released: 2006; 4. "Sugat" Released: 2006

Professional ratings
Review scores
| Source | Rating |
|---|---|
| titikpilipino.com | 4/5 stars |

Paghilom (Eng: "Healing") is the debut studio album by Filipino nu metal band Dicta License under Warner Music Philippines and was released on September 21, 2005. The album has an evident socio-political theme that speaks mostly to the youth about evident issues in the Philippines.

== Track listing ==
All tracks are written by Dicta License.

| No. | Title | Length |
|---|---|---|
| 1. | "Ang Ating Araw" | 3:38 |
| 2. | "Daloy Ng Kamalayan" | 2:59 |
| 3. | "The Enemy" | 4:05 |
| 4. | "Complex" | 3:58 |
| 5. | "Alay Sa Nagkamalay Noong Dekada Nobenta" | 3:26 |
| 6. | "Demockracy" | 2:30 |
| 7. | "Sugat" | 3:22 |
| 8. | "Falling Earth" | 4:50 |
| 9. | "Over The Edge" | 4:12 |
| 10. | "DOTFB" | 4:15 |

== Personnel ==
- Pochoy Labog – vocals
- Boogie Romero – guitars, vocals
- Kelley Mangahas – bass
- Bryan Makasiar – drums

== Credits ==
- Executive Producer - Ricky R. Ilacad
- Project Coordinator - Frey Zambrano
- Album Cover Design - Nix Puno
