= Direksyon =

Studio album by APO Hiking Society
- Released: 1987
- Genre: Original Pilipino Music, Filipino Rock, Pop
- Label: Universal Records, Philippines

APO Hiking Society chronology
The Worst of Apo Hiking Society (1986)	Direksyon (1987)	Mga Kuwento ng Apo (1988)

Direksyon is the ninth studio album of the Filipino trio Apo Hiking Society. It's a 10-track album released in 1987 under Universal Records.

== Track listing ==
1. "Ajaw-Ajaw" (4:12)
2. "Kung Sino-Sino, Kung Saan-Saan" (4:57)
3. "Softly" (3:49)
4. "Minsan sa Buhay" (3:58)
5. "In My Heart (Alay Kay Ka Stevie W.)" (3:40)
6. "Getting Better" (3:13)
7. "Ayoko Sana" (4:23)
8. "Care" (2:43)
9. "Tamad" (3:32)
10. "Sasaya ang Pilipinas" (3:42)
