= Mismo! =

Studio album by APO Hiking Society
- Released: 1999
- Genre: Original Pilipino Music, Filipino rock, pop
- Label: Universal Records, Philippines

APO Hiking Society chronology
Dating Alternatib (1996)	''Mismo!'' (1999)	Banda Rito (2001)

Mismo! is the sixteenth studio album of the Filipino trio Apo Hiking Society. It's an 11-track album released in 1999 under Universal Records.

== Track listing ==
1. Take This Step (3:59)
2. Isang Dangkal (4:15)
3. Missing Parts (4:34)
4. Mamahalin Mo Pa Kaya Ako (3:38)
5. Telephone Pal (3:58)
6. Beginner (2:39)
7. Pito ni Juan (4:36)
8. Pula, Puti, Ginto, Itim (5:07)
9. Dong (3:01)
10. Paggising Mo Bukas (4:00)
11. Gusto (3:48)

== Related links ==
- The Official Apo Hiking Society Website
