= DalawampunAposila =

DalawampunAPOsila

Live album by APO Hiking Society
- Released: 1989
- Recorded: July 14 & 15, 1989
- Genres: Original Pilipino Music (OPM); pop
- Length: 81:01
- Label: WEA Records (Philippines)

APO Hiking Society chronology
Mga Kuwento ng Apo (1988)	DalawampunAPOsila (1989)	Songbuk ng APO (1991)

DalawampunAPOsila is a double live album of the Filipino trio Apo Hiking Society, released in 1989 under WEA Records.

== Track listing ==
1. Heto Na (05:13)
2. Taglines (03:10)
3. Wala Nang Hahanapin Pa (03:56)
4. True to My Music Medley (06:22) with
5. Lumang Tugtugin (05:14)
6. Hollow Guitar Suite (08:59)
7. Mr. T 2 (07:37)
8. Ajaw-Ajaw (07:34)
9. Pumapatak Classic (04:56)
10. 'Di Na Natuto (07:39)
11. Piece of the Peace
12. Finale Medley (08:00)
