= Kami nAPO Muna =

2006 tribute album

Compilation album by Various artists
- Released: 2006
- Genre: Original Pilipino Music (OPM); Pinoy rock; pop
- Length: 69:35
- Label: Universal, Philippines

Various artists chronology
Kami nAPO Muna (2006)	Kami nAPO Muna Ulit (2007)

Professional ratings
Review scores
Source	Rating
Original Pinoy Musikahan	5/5 stars

Kami nAPO Muna is a tribute album to the 1970s Filipino musical group, Apo Hiking Society. Released in 2006, the album features covers of Apo Hiking Society songs, performed by a number of Filipino bands and artists. It was followed by a second tribute album, Kami nAPO Muna Ulit, in 2007.

== Title ==
The album's title, Kami nAPO Muna, loosely translates to "our turn now" in Filipino; the phrase is also a play on the name Apo. Apo Hiking Society itself has used the word nAPO (na pô, the respectful form of "already") in many concerts, as well as on a noontime variety show.

== Concert ==
A tribute concert sponsored by MYX Music Channel was held during the launch of the album, in honour of the trio's contributions to OPM Music. A two-disc limited edition set of Kami nAPO Muna has been released, with the second disc containing Apo Hiking Society's original versions of the tribute tracks. The album is considered the biggest-selling album of 2006 in the Philippines, with 4× Platinum Certification (i.e., more than 125,000 copies sold) in less than six months. It also garnered Awit Awards' Bestselling Album of the Year for 2007.

== Track listing ==
All tracks are written by Apo Hiking Society.

No.	Title	Artist(s)	Length
1.	"Pumapatak ang Ulan (The Rain Is Falling) (Note: Parokya ni Edgar's rendition of Pumapatak Na Naman Ang Ulan was also included in their album, Edgar Edgar Musikahan, released in 2002.)"	Parokya ni Edgar	2:58
2.	"Yakap sa Dilim (Embrace in the Dark)"	Orange and Lemons	3:08
3.	"Doo Bi Doo"	Kamikazee	4:04
4.	"Awit ng Barkada (The Song of the Clique)"	Itchyworms	3:30
5.	"Nakapagtataka (Wondrous)"	Sponge Cola	3:55
6.	"Ewan (Dunno)"	Imago	3:54
7.	"Batang-bata Ka Pa (You're Still Too Young)"	Sugarfree	6:00
8.	"Kumot at Unan (Blanket and Pillow)"	Boldstar	3:43
9.	"When I Met You"	Barbie Almalbis	3:54
10.	"Bakit ang Babae (Why Is a Woman...)"	Sandwich	3:58
11.	"Kabilugan Ng Buwan (Full Moon)"	Drip	4:46
12.	"Di Na Natuto (Didn't Learn)"	Sound	3:40
13.	"Anna"	Top Suzara	4:39
14.	"Blue Jeans"	Rocksteddy	3:50
15.	"Panalangin (Prayer)"	Moonstar88	3:53
16.	"Paano (How)"	Shamrock	3:47
17.	"Pag-ibig (Love)"	Kitchie Nadal	2:47
18.	"Bawat Bata (Every Child)"	The Dawn	3:09
Total length:			69:35
