= Paramita (band) =

Filipino pop rock band

- Origin: Manila, Philippines
- Genres: Alternative rock; Pinoy rock
- Years active: 2002–2013
- Labels: Vicor Music, Blaster Music
- Members: Ria Bautista; Marco de Leon; Norman Dellosa; Alsey Cortez

Paramita was a pop rock act in the Philippines that played their own brand of music from 2005 to 2013. Paramita was made up of Marco De Leon on guitars (replacing Norman Dellosa), Alsey Cortez on bass, and Ria Bautista on drums and vocals. Paramita has released three several albums in its career.

== History ==
In 2005, they released their first single "Hiling" under Vicor Records which placed them on the map. It was included in the 10-track full-length album entitled Tala. Six of the album's songs are written in English while four are in Tagalog. Their second album was self-titled Paramita which was released in 2008 under Terno Recordings.

Despite being a young band, Paramita has been featured in several media sources, such as MTV Ink magazine, the Philippine Daily Inquirer, NU 107's In The Raw radio program and the ABS-CBN morning show Breakfast. Paramita is becoming one of the most solid independent acts in the scene today, enlightened by music and strengthened by a belief in their own talents. By 2010, they decided to go fully independent under Blaster Music (an independent music organization) and launched their third album named Liyab. Their song "Turbulence" was on NU107.7 Stairway to Seven and was no. 1 for 12 weeks on UR105.9 Underground Radio. Their songs "Sulyap" and "Nightingale" received airplay on local stations.

Paramita is now with Blaster Music along with Reklamo and upcoming artists Odat, Penguin, Trapeze, and Eleyn.

== Break-up ==
In the 10th day of October 2013, Paramita announced its disbanding and their future plans as individual artists and musicians on the group's Facebook page.

== Band members ==
- Marco De Leon – rhythm guitar
- Alsey Cortez – co-vocals, bass guitar
- Ria Bautista – drums, lead vocals

== Former Members ==
- Normal Dellosa - Guitars
- Paolo Legaspi - Bass

== Former members ==
- Norman Dellosa – lead guitar
- Jeremy Lacorte - rhythm guitar
- Paolo Legaspi - bass

== Discography ==
=== Studio albums ===
- Tala – 2005 Vicor Music Corporation
- Paramita – 2008 Terno Recordings
- Liyab – 2010 Blaster Records

=== Collaboration albums ===
- Kami nAPO Muna Ulit (2007, Universal)

== Awards and nominations ==
Year	Award giving body	Category	Nominated work	Results
2005	NU Rock Awards	Best New Artist	—N/a	Nominated
2005	NU Rock Awards	Vocalist of the Year	(for Ria Bautista)	Nominated
2005	NU Rock Awards	Drummer of the Year	(for Ria Bautista)	Nominated
2005	NU Rock Awards	Best Female Award	(for Ria Bautista)	Nominated
2006	NU Rock Awards	Rising Sun Awards	—N/a	Nominated
2006	NU Rock Awards	Best Female Award	(for Ria Bautista)	Nominated
2010	NU Rock Awards	Vocalist of the Year	(for Ria Bautista)	Nominated
2010	NU Rock Awards	Guitarist of the Year	(for Marco de Leon)	Nominated
2010	NU Rock Awards	Bassist of the Year	(for Alsey Cortez)	Nominated
