= Apo Hiking Society (1982 album) =

Studio album by Apo Hiking Society
- Released: 1982
- Genre: OPM; pop
- Label: Universal Records

Apo Hiking Society chronology
Apo Hiking Society (1980)	Apo Hiking Society (1982)	The Best of Apo Hiking Society Volume 1 (1982)

Apo Hiking Society (later retitled Twelve Years Together) is the fifth studio album by the Filipino trio Apo Hiking Society. The 11-track album was released in 1982 by WEA Records (now Universal Records).

== Track listing ==
1. "Mag-Artista Ka" (4:09)
2. "Araw" (3:37)
3. "Salawikain" (4:25)
4. "Bakit Ba?" (3:38)
5. "Inaamin Ko" (3:32)
6. "Pakinggan Mo (Ang Awit Ko)" (3:36)
7. "Tuyo Na'ng Damdamin" (2:37)
8. "Mahal Kita (Ngunit Ayaw Mo sa Akin)" (3:49)
9. "Giliw" (3:13)
10. "Gabi Na Naman" (4:41)
11. "Blue Jeans" (4:19)

== Related links ==
- The Official Apo Hiking Society Website
