= Pagkatapos ng Palabas =

Studio album by Apo Hiking Society
- Released: 1978
- Recorded: 1978
- Genre: Original Pilipino Music; Filipino Rock; Pop
- Label: JEM Records
- Producer: The Apo Hiking Society

Apo Hiking Society chronology
Songwriter (1976)	Pagkatapos ng Palabas (1978)	Ten Years Together (1980)

Singles from Pagkatapos ng Palabas
- 1. "Pumapatak ang Ulan" / "Bakit ang Babae sa Tagal ng Pagsasama (Tila Mas Mahirap Maintindihan)" Released: 1977; 2. "Lumang Tugtugin" / "O Bumalik Ka Sana" Released: 1978; 3. "Kaibigan" / "Pag-ibig" Released: 1978

Pagkatapos ng Palabas is the third studio album of the Filipino trio Apo Hiking Society. It was released in 1978 under JEM Records label.

== Track listing ==
Side A

1. "Pumapatak ang Ulan" (Danny Javier) - arranged by Jim Paredes – 2:52
2. "Hanggang May Pag-ibig" (Jim Paredes) - arranged by Jim Paredes, Willy Cruz – 4:17
3. "Lumang Tugtugin" (Danny Javier) - arranged by Eddie Munji III – 3:42
4. "Nakapagtataka" (Jim Paredes) - arranged by Jim Paredes, Willy Cruz – 4:19
5. "O Bumalik Ka Sana" (Boboy Garrovillo) - arranged by Eddie Munji III, Jim Paredes – 3:49

Side B

1. "Pag-ibig" (Danny Javier) - arranged by Eddie Munji III, Jim Paredes – 3:12
2. "Pag-ibig Mong Kay Ganda (Sana Ito'y Di Mawala)" (Jim Paredes) - arranged by Eddie Munji III – 3:55
3. "Bakit ang Babae sa Tagal ng Pagsasama (Tila Mas Mahirap Maintindihan)" (Jim Paredes) - arranged by Jim Paredes – 4:12
4. "Kaibigan" (Danny Javier) - arranged by Jim Paredes – 4:22
5. "Pagkatapos ng Palabas" (Boboy Garrovillo) - arranged by Eddie Munji III, Jim Paredes – 4:00

== Credits ==
According to the album's credits.

- Wiggy Gonzales – album concept
- Fred Alcantora – design artist
- Bert Moreno, Domingo Casulla – recording assistant
- Boy Roxas, Dindo Aldecoa, Jess Payumo – technical
- The Apo Hiking Society – producer
