= Mga Kuwento ng Apo =

Studio album by APO Hiking Society
- Released: 1988
- Genre: Original Pilipino Music, Filipino rock, pop
- Label: WEA Records
- Producer: G. Mon David

APO Hiking Society chronology
Direksyon (1987)	Mga Kuwento ng Apo (1988)	DalawampunAPOsila (1989)

Mga Kuwento ng Apo is the tenth studio album of the Filipino trio Apo Hiking Society, released in 1988 under WEA Records.

== Track listing ==
1. "Syotang Pa-Class" (4:13)
2. "Huwag Masanay sa Pagmamahal" (3:23)
3. "Wala Nang Hahanapin Pa" (3:51)
4. "Mahal Pa Rin Kita" (4:21)
5. "Alipin ng Mundo" (4:15)
6. "Di Na Natuto" (4:53)
7. "Awit ng Barkada" (3:38)
8. "Magkikita Rin Tayo" (3:35)
9. "Sa Bawat Umaga" (4:07)
10. "Piece of the Peace" (4:04)

== Related links ==
- The Official Apo Hiking Society Website
