= PaskonAPO =

Studio album by APO Hiking Society
- Released: 1991
- Genre: Original Pilipino Music, Filipino rock, pop
- Label: Universal Records, Philippines

APO Hiking Society chronology
The Best of Apo Hiking Society Volume 2 (1991)	''PaskonAPO'' (1991)	1-2-3 (1992)

PaskonAPO is the twelfth studio album of the Filipino trio Apo Hiking Society. It's an 11-track Christmas album released in 1991, under Universal Records. 15 years later, the cd was re-released and digitally remastered in 2006 with a new cover.

== Track listing ==
1. "Paskong Walang Pera" - 03:53
2. "12 Days of Pinoy Krismas" - 03:43
3. "Pasko Na Sinta Ko, Miss Kita Kung Christmas" - 05:41
4. "Sanggol Na Mahiwaga" - 03:49
5. "Himig ng Pasko" - 03:33
6. "Pasko Na sa Mundo" - 03:20
7. "Panahon ng Pag-ibig" - 04:19
8. "Pasko Na" - 03:37
9. "Lata ang Aming Tambol" - 03:06
10. "Tuloy Na Tuloy Pa Rin ang Pasko" - 02:39
11. "Ang Pasko" - 03:32

== Related links ==
- The Official Apo Hiking Society Website
- PaskonAPO on Amazon
