= Turbo Goth =

Filipino electronic rock duo

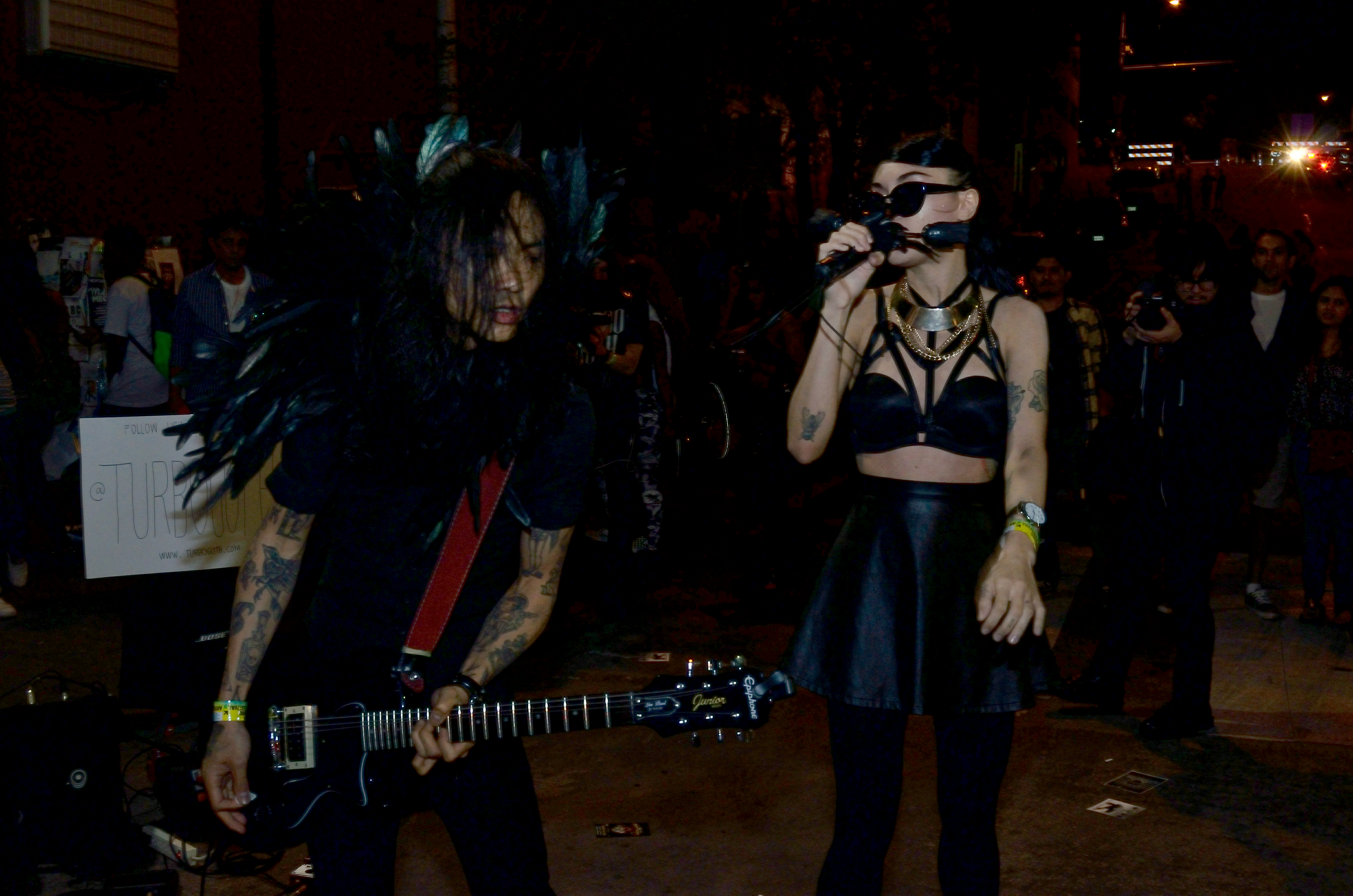
- Turbo Goth at SXSW 2017

Background information
- Origin: Manila, Philippines
- Genre: Industrial electronic rock
- Years active: 2008–present
- Members: P-P; S-G

Turbo Goth is a NYC based, electronic rock duo from the Philippines. Formed in 2008, Turbo Goth is composed of Sarah Gaugler (on lead vocals) and Paolo Peralta (on guitar/electronic sampler). Turbo Goth's music is semi-experimental electronic music with distorted bass synths backed by aggressive heavy beats and guitars, stitched together by light vocals. Turbo Goth has had numerous performances in the Philippines and at music festivals in Asia, but after their show at South by Southwest in 2014, they decided to relocate, for a broader audience, finding a new home in New York by the end of that year. Turbo Goth's notable international performances include the 2011 Baybeats Music Festival in Singapore, 2012 CAMA Festival in Vietnam, and shows around the U.S.

The duo launched their debut album Destroy Us All in January 2011; the first single taken from that album was "Venus Flytrap".

== History ==
=== Formation ===
Logo

Turbo Goth was formed in 2008 when Paolo Peralta invited Sarah Gaugler to form an electronic rock band. The two decided to collaborate when Peralta, then a solo electronic musician, heard Gaugler's voice while she was singing in the car along to her favorite songs. Prior to that, Gaugler, a visual artist and painter, had no prior professional singing experience.

The duo then spent the next few months developing their sound. Peralta would lay down the tracks with an electronic sampler, while Gaugler would write the lyrics and melody for Peralta's music. The two then started hitting the underground music circuit in 2009. They also released a single, "Morning Swim", to selected local radio stations and online portals.

=== Destroy Us All ===
By 2010, Turbo Goth had written a handful of original songs, which they performed at their regular gigs. Peralta and Gaugler then selected some of the stronger tracks to compile into a full-length album. The duo then recorded, mixed, and mastered the tracks at Wombworks, a recording studio in Marikina, within a few months. They released the album, Destroy Us All independently on January 27, 2011. "Venus Flytrap", the first single from Destroy Us All, received notable airplay on progressive radio stations.

== Style and songwriting ==
Turbo Goth describes their music as "gloss rock"; they create a rock track, embellished with distorted bass synths and heavy drumbeats (both produced with a "groovebox"). Peralta then lays in basic simple guitar tracks (using a Telecaster) with heavy delays and aggressive ambience. Gaugler's vocal tracks are then laced into the song; the duo considers Gaugler's vocals as an "instrument" and treat it accordingly. The duo play nearly all shows just guitar, vocals and drum machine. Gaugler is responsible for all of the lyrics and vocal melodies.

== Discography ==
=== Albums ===
- Destroy Us All (2010)

=== Singles ===
- "Morning Swim" (2009)
- "Venus Flytrap" (2011)

== Awards and nominations ==
Awards and nominations
Year	Award giving body	Category	Nominated work/ Person	Results
2009	2009 QLE Awards	Best Live Act	Turbo Goth	Won
2011	MYX Music Awards (MMA) 2011	Favorite Indie Artist	Turbo Goth	Included
