= Collector's Item (Apo Hiking Society album) =

Studio album by Apo Hiking Society
- Released: 1975
- Genres: OPM, rock, pop
- Labels: Sunshine; Vicor

Apo Hiking Society chronology
In Concert #$%!? (1974)	''Collector's Item'' (1975)	Songwriter (1976)

Collector's Item is the debut studio album of the Filipino trio Apo Hiking Society, released in 1975 under the Sunshine label.

== Track listing ==
1. "Move" (3:43)
2. "Time Can Let It Wait" (3:11)
3. "Rock n' Roll Music (Medley)" (with apologies to the Beatles) (5:59)
4. "Kasal" (3:12)
5. "Softly" (3:11)
6. "Be Right" (2:58)
7. "Leaving" (2:58)
8. "Let Me Sing You a Song (Medley)" (with apologies to Donovan) (6:25)
9. "Ano ang Ibig Mong Sabihin" (2:50)
10. "I Love You" (2:53)
11. "Be Nice to Your Fine Feather Friend" (0:21)

== Related links ==
- Official Apo Hiking Society website
