= Feet on the Ground =

Album by Apo Hiking Society

Feet On The Ground

Studio album by Apo Hiking Society
- Released: 1984
- Genre: Original Pilipino Music (OPM); Pinoy rock; pop
- Label: Universal Records, Philippines

Apo Hiking Society chronology
True to My Music (1983)	Feet On The Ground (1984)	Made in the Philippines (1985)

Feet on the Ground is the seventh studio album by the Filipino musical trio Apo Hiking Society, released in 1984 through Universal Records. The album's cover artwork features an homage to the Beatles album Abbey Road, featuring the band walking across a pedestrian crossing.

== Track listing ==
1. Hitting the Big Time (4:39)
2. Goodtime (4:15)
3. Oh My Love (3:48)
4. Yes This Is the Right (4:06)
5. Brothers, Sisters, Mothers, Fathers (4:23)
6. Anna (3:16)
7. A New Thing in My Life (3:27)
8. I'm the Real Thing (4:17)
9. Love Is Not Enough (2:38)
10. Come to Me (3:23)
11. Prisoner's Lament (4:13)
