= Mcoy Fundales =

Filipino musician, writer and actor (born 1977)

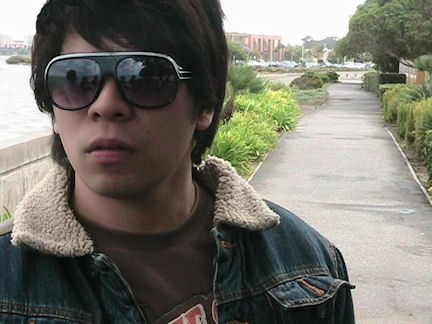
- Fundales in 2008

Background information
- Born: Marco Fundales; November 3, 1977 (age 48); Baliwag, Bulacan, Philippines
- Genres: Alternative rock; pop rock
- Occupations: Musician; writer
- Instruments: Vocals; acoustic guitar
- Years active: 1999–present
- Labels: Terno Recordings; Universal; AltG Records
- Formerly of: Orange and Lemons; Kenyo

Marco "Mcoy" Fundales (born November 3, 1977) is a Filipino musician, writer and actor. He was the former lead vocalist and rhythm guitarist of the popular Pinoy rock band Orange and Lemons. He is currently the lead vocalist of the band Kenyo. His musical influences are the bands like The Smiths, Eraserheads and The Beatles.

He was one of the participants in ABS-CBN reality show, Pinoy Big Brother Celebrity Edition Season 2. Fundales is currently serving as the writer for GMA Network's programs such as sitcom Pepito Manaloto, gag show Bubble Gang, and previously worked for the comedy segments of variety show All-Out Sundays until 2024.

== Personal life ==
Fundales was born on November 3, 1977, in Baliuag, Bulacan. He attended Mariano Ponce High School in Bulacan in 1990s where he met Clem Castro. The two later formed Orange and Lemons in late '90s. He is an Eagle Scout of the Boy Scouts of the Philippines and a Ten Outstanding Boy Scouts of the Philippines Awardee.

== Career ==
=== Orange and Lemons (1999–2007) ===
Orange and Lemons was officially formed in 1999. The band originally consisted of Mcoy Fundales on vocals, Clem Castro on guitars, Law Santiago on bass and Michael Salvador on drums. The band started doing cover songs from their influenced artists, The Beatles and The Smiths. The band were managed by Bong Baluyot.

Sometime in early 2000s, Fundales and Clem Castro met brothers Ace and JM del Mundo in a local bar in Bulacan. The two replaced original members Law Santiago and Michael Salvador who left the group and filled the full-time duties for bass and drums. The band later recorded their new songs and released their debut album Love in the Land of Rubber Shoes and Dirty Ice Cream on December 3, 2003, under Terno Recordings.

In October 2004, Orange and Lemons signed a contract Universal Records. The band proceeded to record a new album; their second and first under a major label. Strike Whilst The Iron Is Hot was completed and released on April 28, 2005, with singles including "Hanggang Kailan (Umuwi Ka Na Baby)", "Heaven Knows (This Angel Has Flown)" and "Lihim". One of the band's biggest breaks came with an offer from Philippine media giant ABS-CBN for Orange and Lemons to do the jingle/soundtrack for a new series Pinoy Big Brother, the Philippine franchised version of the reality TV show Big Brother. Orange and Lemons came up with a song called "Pinoy Ako".

=== Kenyo and solo activities (2007–present) ===
After weeks of speculation, it was reported on October 10, 2007, by Inquirer News that Orange and Lemons had disbanded. The reason stated was primarily due to differences between band members and their managers. The three remaining members later formed a new band called Kenyo. The band released their debut album, Radiosurfing in 2008.

On May 24, 2014, it was announced that Fundales would be taking part in the third Philippine Popular Music Festival interpreting the song "Kung Akin Ang Langit" alongside singer Clara Benin, daughter of former Side A bassist Joey Benin. On July 26, the entry won the Spinnr People's Choice award.

== Discography ==
=== Singles ===
Year	Title	Label	Notes
2022	Ang Forever Ko'y Ikaw	AltG Records	Theme song of the 2018 series with the same title (Lyrics are later completed in 2022)
2019	Bakit Kita Hahabulin	AltG Records	Comeback single

=== Albums ===
Year	Title	Band
2011	Maharlika	Kenyo
2008	Radiosurfing	Kenyo
2007	Moonlane Gardens	Orange and Lemons
2005	Strike Whilst the Iron Is Hot	Orange and Lemons
2003	Love in the Land of Rubber Shoes & Dirty Ice Cream	Orange and Lemons
