= Dicta License =

Filipino rock band

- Origin: Quezon City, Metro Manila, Philippines
- Genres: Alternative metal; nu metal; rap metal; rap rock
- Years active: 1999–present
- Label: Warner Music
- Members: Pochoy Labog (vocals); Bryan Makasiar (drums); Kelley Mangahas (bass); Boogie Romero (guitars)

Dicta License is a Filipino rock band formed in December 1999, whose music is a fusion of rock, rap, and grunge. The band consists of Pochoy Labog on vocals, Bryan Makasiar on drums, Kelley Mangahas on bass, and Boogie Romero on guitar.

The band's name literally translates as "License to Speak", which can be aptly associated with the philosophical cum socio-political tone evident in their songs. The band's influences include Rage Against the Machine, Lauryn Hill, the Roots, Public Enemy, Incubus among many others, with RATM being their strongest influence of all.

== Career ==
In 2001, Warner Music Philippines included their songs "Duct Tape" and "Criminal" in its compilation album No Seat Affair, together with other bands such as Cog, DTS, Zooom, Six Digit and Euglito's Eye. In the same year, the band was invited to the Busan International Rock Festival in Korea, where they performed in front of a crowd of about 25,000.

In 2003, they released a 5-song EP which consisted of their original songs "Burning Streets of Love and Hate", "Criminal", "Smoke Under the Table", "Falling Earth" and "Undiscarded". Two years later, the band released their first album Paghilom under Warner Music Philippines on September 21, 2005. It consisted of ten tracks with lyrics that explicitly address the Filipino youth with issues of socio-political concern. Their carrier single from this album, "Ang Ating Araw" was the most played song on NU 107 for the year 2005. On April 9, 2021, the band released their second album Pagbigkas as a digital release and a Limited Edition and numbered pressing vinyl of the album was released on May 25, 2022.

== Achievements ==
Band recognitions include nominations at the MTV Pilipinas Video Music Awards 2006 for Best Cinematography in a Video and Best Production Design in a Video for their song, "Complex". Vocalist Pochoy Labog was nominated at the NU 107 Rock Awards 2006 for Vocalist of the Year and Best Male, and Boogie for Guitarist of the Year. The band was also nominated for the Rising Sun award.

Dicta License also collaborated with Urbandub to do the theme song for the 2006 MTV Music Summit for HIV/AIDS, which was held December 2006 at The Fort Open Grounds.

== Discography ==
=== Albums ===
- Paghilom (2005)
- Pagbigkas (2021)

=== Compilation appearances ===
- Kami nAPO Muna Ulit - "Tuloy ang Ikot ng Mundo" (2007), Universal

== Awards and nominations ==
Year	Award giving body	Category	Nominated work	Results
2005	NU Rock Awards	Song of the Year	"Ang Ating Araw"	Nominated
2005	NU Rock Awards	Best Male Award	(for Pochoy Labog)	Nominated
2006	NU Rock Awards	Vocalist of the Year	(for Pochoy Labog)	Nominated
2006	NU Rock Awards	Guitarist of the Year	(for Boogie Romero)	Nominated
2006	NU Rock Awards	Rising Sun Award	—N/a	Nominated
2006	NU Rock Awards	Best Male Award	(for Pochoy Labog)	Nominated
