= Clementine (musician) =

Filipino singer-songwriter and music producer

- Also known as: Clem Castro, Dragonfly Collector
- Born: Clemen Castro; December 10, 1976 (age 49); Baliuag, Bulacan, Philippines
- Genres: Indie pop; indie folk
- Occupations: Musician; singer; songwriter; label manager
- Instruments: Vocals; guitars; banduria; octavina
- Years active: 1999–present
- Labels: Terno; Universal; Lilystars
- Member of: Orange and Lemons; Dragonfly Collector
- Formerly of: The Camerawalls
- Website: dragonflycollector.com

Clem Castro (born 10 December 1976), also known by the mononym as Clementine, is a Filipino singer-songwriter and music producer who gained recognition with the band Orange and Lemons. After the band's break up in 2007, Clementine formed The Camerawalls and founded Lilystars Records, his own independent record label. He is also known for his solo project Dragonfly Collector, in which he released his solo debut album.

== Early life and musical influences ==
Clementine was raised surrounded by 60s rock n’ roll and psychedelic music and from an early age took inspiration from The Beatles and later on post punk guitar groups like The Smiths. Clementine began playing his dad's guitar at the age of 10 and after several years of effort to emulate his influences he began songwriting and composing by ear.

== Orange & Lemons ==
He founded Orange & Lemons in 1999 and, with a collection of juvenile materials, paved the way for independent recognition to mainstream success of the band. He is the chief songwriter, lead guitarist and the main creative force behind Orange & Lemons. He has produced albums that has reached the ears of foreign music enthusiasts in Japan, Germany, UK and US and has produced songs that has the touch of international appeal and sold gold and platinum records in the Philippines plus other numerous awards and commercial projects.

Each album showcases his evolution as a guitarist and songwriter, with what is considered his most groundbreaking and brooding work – Moonlane Gardens (2007) – resulted in a fray between bandmates, management, and label. A battle between creativity and commercialism ensues and after a few months concluded in the parting of ways. Moonlane Gardens was hailed 2007 Album of The Year during the NU Rock Awards.

=== The Camerawalls and Lilystars Records ===
The outfit that is Orange & Lemons officially disbanded in September 2007 after a successful US Tour. Clementine went back to indie status and formed a 3-piece indie pop band The Camerawalls and released the debut album "Pocket Guide To The Otherworld" in July 2008 under his own indie label -- Lilystars Records earning a nomination and recognition as one of the best new local group to come out with a release during the year. The debut album "Pocket Guide To The Otherworld" showed people what happens when contemporary indie pop meets good old Filipino sensibilities.

Clementine signed a number of obscure artists under his label and was the first to release physical CD singles. He also formed an events production called The POP Shoppe! to support notable indie acts and was able to produce the first major concert for the Swedish group Club 8 in Manila in 2010.

== Discography ==
=== Albums ===
==== With Orange & Lemons ====
- Love in the Land of Rubber Shoes & Dirty Ice Cream - (December 2003 - Terno Recordings)
- Strike Whilst the Iron Is Hot - (April 2005 - Universal Records)
- Moonlane Gardens - (June 2007 - Universal Records)
- Love in the Land of Rubber Shoes & Dirty Ice Cream (15th Anniversary Edition) - (June 2018 - Lilystars Records)
- La Bulaqueña - (April 2022 - Lilystars Records)

==== As Dragonfly Collector ====
- The World Is Your Oyster - (January 2015 - Lilystars Records)

==== With The Camerawalls ====
- Pocket Guide to the Otherworld - (July 2008 - Lilystars Records)

=== Singles ===
- There Is No Remaining in Place - (December 2013 - Lilystars Records)
- Wanderlust - (August 2012 - Lilystars Records)
- The Sight of Love - (February 2010 - Lilystars Records)
- Boys in the Backrooms - (2017 - Lilystar Records)

=== EPs ===
- Bread and Circuses - (December 2010 - Lilystars Records)
