= Orange and Lemons =

Filipino pop rock band

- Origin: Baliwag, Bulacan, Philippines
- Genres: Rock; Pop; Indie; Psychedelia
- Works: Albums; singles; songs; covers; recording sessions; performances
- Years active: 1999–2007; 2017–present
- Labels: Terno; Universal; Lilystars
- Publisher: Universal Records
- Spinoffs: Dragonfly Collector
- Spinoff of: The Camerawalls; KENYO; Project 1; The Spaceflower Show
- Members: Clem Castro; JM del Mundo; Ace del Mundo; Jared Nerona; (see § Band members for others)
- Website: orangeandlemons.co

Orange and Lemons (usually typeset as Orange & Lemons and abbreviated as "O&L" or "ONL") is a Filipino pop rock band founded and formed in 1999 by lead vocalist and guitarist Clem Castro and former member Mcoy Fundales. Brothers JM and Ace del Mundo were later recruited to complete the mainstream lineup. Fundales served as the lead vocalist and guitarist since its formation until its initial breakup in 2007.

The group's musical genre's been a mix of alternative rock, indie pop and psychedelic music and heavily influenced by several well-respected bands in different generations like The Smiths, The Beatles and the Eraserheads. The band had released three several albums and gained commercial success with their sophomore album Strike Whilst the Iron is Hot released in 2005.

The group parted ways in 2007 due to musical differences. Following the band's breakup, several members formed their own groups. Mcoy Fundales formed Kenyo alongside JM and Ace del Mundo. While, Clem formed his own indie group The Camerawalls with the band's original member, Law Santiago.

In 2017, after 10 years on hiatus, the band announced that they would reunite as a trio, and later as a quartet when keyboardist Jared Nerona joined.

== History ==
=== Active years (1999–2007) ===
The band name "Oranges and Lemons" was initially recommended by a former member of the group. Apparently the band was not aware at the time that the name was actually derived from a British nursery rhyme and a title of an album by the British band XTC.

Clem Castro and Mcoy Fundales met in high school in the mid-1990s. The duo formed a group with friends (with Law Santiago and Michael Salvador) from their province of Bulacan and went through several names such before eventually settling on Orange and Lemons. Brothers Ace and JM del Mundo were in a band called Colossal Youth when they met Castro and Fundales in a local bar in Bulacan in 1999. Castro and Fundales with two other friends were handled by Roldan "Bong" Baluyot of No Seat Affair (a local management, booking and production outfit) when they recorded a two-track demo ("She's Leaving Home", "Isang Gabi") in 1999 as Orange and Lemons. The song "She's Leaving Home" soon found its way to radio station NU107.5 FM's playlist.

The band went on hiatus in 2001, but was reformed in 2003 with the Del Mundos in the line-up permanently.They started arranging and rehearsing original songs that would eventually end up in their debut album, Love in the Land of Rubber Shoes and Dirty Ice Cream. which was released on December 3, 2003 With a style of retro music combined with alternative rock, the band's main musical influences ranged from The Beatles and The Smiths, to The Cure and Eraserheads.

Castro and Fundales contacted Bong Baluyot to once again handle the band and 10 songs were recorded in 3 days due to a limited financial budget. After the songs were recorded, Baluyot once again started scouting around for a label that would take the group in.

The band had their first gig stint in a club in Makati City called Where Else? It was in one of those gigs that ONL met Toti Dalmacion, formerly of Groove Nation, a local music store famous for rare and hard-to-find vinyl records. Dalmacion was already toying with the idea of establishing an independent label that he would call Terno Recordings. The label would showcase unsigned and talented Filipino artists with a unique sound and style that could (hopefully) pass international standards. He proposed that ONL be the flagship artist for the label. A one-album deal was signed.

ONL's 10-track debut album, Love in the Land of Rubber Shoes and Dirty Ice Cream was independently released and launched in December 2003. The album's single "Just Like A Splendid Love Song" released on January 1, 2004 got radio airplay on NU107.5 FM and reached the station's number 1 spot in their weekly countdown. Orange and Lemons was declared Best New Artist for 2004 in NU107's yearly Rock Awards event.

ONL signed a contract with Universal Records in October 2004. The band proceeded to record a new album; their second and first under a major label. Strike Whilst The Iron Is Hot was completed and released on April 28, 2005, with singles including "Lihim" earliest released on September 16, 2004, "Hanggang Kailan (Umuwi Ka Na Baby)" released on March 16, 2005, and "Heaven Knows (This Angel Has Flown)" released on June 16, 2005. One of the band's biggest breaks came with an offer from Philippine media giant ABS-CBN Corporation for ONL to do the jingle/soundtrack for a new series Pinoy Big Brother, the Philippine franchised version of the reality TV show Big Brother. ONL came up with a song called "Pinoy Ako" released on August 1, 2005.

Other projects of the band included "Abot Kamay" and "Let Me" (a song for a shampoo advertisement) and "Blue Moon" (their version of the classic track for a movie theme song).

In June 2005, Orange and Lemons was featured on MTV Philippines in its Rising Star segment, and in March 2006 they were featured in the "Lokal Artist of the Month" segment. Orange and Lemons were named "Artist of the Year" at the NU107's Rock Awards for 2005.

The release of the tribute album of the Apo Hiking Society, Kami nAPO Muna in 2006, where the band contributed one track, gave Orange and Lemons the spotlight again. Orange and Lemons once again did their take on yet another Apo song "Tuloy na Tuloy Pa Rin Ang Pasko" by December 2006. The song was used by ABS-CBN for their Christmas station ID. As a follow-up to "Abot Kamay", the band completed a song from Unilever Philippines called "Let Me" and was used for another shampoo advertisement. Universal Records released their third and last album on June 8, 2007 called Moonlane Gardens. Their first single in that album was "Ang Katulad Mong Walang Katulad" and their last single before they disbanded was "Fade".

=== "Pinoy Ako" plagiarism allegations ===
Allegations have been made that the melody and musical arrangement of the band's breakout single "Pinoy Ako", which was the theme song for the reality show Pinoy Big Brother, was stolen from an obscure single, "Chandeliers" by the 1980s English new wave band Care. In a 2021 interview, Castro admitted that he did "subconsciously" apply the chord patterns to "Pinoy Ako" as they also covered songs from The Cure at the time, though he also maintained that the progression used for the song is widely used across genres such as blues and reggae.

=== Post Orange and Lemons (2007–2017) ===
It was reported on October 10, 2007 by the Inquirer.net that Orange and Lemons had disbanded. The reason stated was primarily due to differences between band members and their managers. Clem Castro, the then lead guitarist of the band, then started his own band, 3-piece indie pop group The Camerawalls signed under his own label, Lilystars Records. He formed the band with original Orange and Lemons' bassist Law. The three remaining band members formed a new band called Kenyo.

=== Sudden return (2017–present) ===
In July 2017, after ten years on hiatus, the band announced on its official Facebook page that they were going to reform as a trio, involving Clem Castro on vocals and lead guitars, JM del Mundo on bass guitar, and Ace del Mundo on drums. In August 2018, the band headlined Moonlane Festival, a concert that it also produced. In January 2019, Jared Nerona (formerly in The Spaceflower Show) joined as the keyboardist and the quartet of the band.

On February 10, 2021, the band's label Lilystars Records announced via Twitter that the band would be recording and releasing a new album in 2021, their first release in fourteen years.

== Artistry ==
The artistry of Orange & Lemons is defined by their unique fusion of British-influenced indie pop and alternative rock with deep Filipino emotional and cultural elements. Their music is known for its melodic guitar work, nostalgic sound, and poetic songwriting that often explores themes of love, longing, and personal reflection. Strongly inspired by classic British bands, their sound carries a retro and timeless quality, yet they express it through Tagalog lyrics and Filipino sensibility, making their identity both international and distinctly local. As their career progressed, their artistry evolved beyond indie pop into incorporating traditional Filipino musical forms such as kundiman, showing their commitment to preserving and reinterpreting national heritage through modern music. Overall, their artistry reflects a balance between vintage influence, emotional storytelling, cultural pride, and continuous artistic growth, which makes their musical identity rich, expressive, and historically significant in OPM.

== Band members ==
Principal members

- Clem Castro – vocals, guitars, chief songwriter (1999–2007, 2017–present)
- JM del Mundo – bass (2001–2007, 2017–present); vocals (2017–present)
- Ace del Mundo – drums, percussion (2001–2007, 2017–present); vocals (2017–present)
- Jared Nerona – keyboard (2019–present)

Early members

- Mcoy Fundales – vocals, guitars (1999–2007)
- Law Santiago – bass (1999–2001)
- Michael Salvador – drums, percussion (1999–2001)

== Discography ==
Orange and Lemons' core catalogue consists of the original 4 studio albums, Love in the Land of Rubber Shoes and Dirty Ice Cream (15th Anniversary Edition) (a special album which was brought into the core catalog in the 2003 when their discography was standardized for compact disc) and Strike Whilst the Iron Is Hot (2004 Demo Sessions) (a demo album which contains the first soundtrack of the later-released sophomore album). Their tributes including the Ultraelectromagneticjam! and Kami nAPO Muna, which contains Filipino tribute singles and EP tracks not released on the previously mentioned 4 releases.

- Love in the Land of Rubber Shoes and Dirty Ice Cream (2003)
- Strike Whilst the Iron Is Hot (2005)
- Ultraelectromagneticjam! (For "Huwag Kang Matakot") (2005)
- Kami nAPO Muna (For "Yakap Sa Dilim") (2006)
- Moonlane Gardens (2007)
- Love in the Land of Rubber Shoes and Dirty Ice Cream ("15th Anniversary Edition") (2018)
- Strike Whilst the Iron Is Hot ("2004 Demo Sessions") (2020)
- La Bulaqueña (2022)

== Songs ==
=== Singles ===
Orange and Lemons' consist of 30 singles in-line based on their album releases and some are non-album/EP tracks.

From Love in the Land of Rubber Shoes and Dirty Ice Cream (2003)

- A Beginning Of Something Wonderful
- Just Like A Splendid Love Song
- Kailangan Kita
- She's Leaving Home

From Strike Whilst the Iron Is Hot (2005)

- Hanggang Kailan (Umuwi Ka Na Baby)
- Heaven Knows (This Angel Has Flown)
- Lihim

From Ultraelectromagneticjam! (2005)

- Huwag Kang Matakot

From Kami nAPO Muna (2006)

- Yakap Sa Dilim

From Moonlane Gardens (2007)

- Ang Katulad Mong Walang Katulad
- Fade
- Let Me
- Moonjive

From La Bulaqueña (2022)

- Hele Para Kay Stella
- Ikaw Ang Aking Tahanan
- Ikaw Na Walang Hanggan
- La Bulaqueña
- Pag-ibig Sa Tabing-Dagat
- Yakapin Natin Ang Gabi

Non-album/EP tracks

- Abot Kamay (2005)
- Blue Moon (2005)
- Pinoy Ako (2005)
- God Rest Ye Marry Gentlemen (2006)
- Lovers Go, Lovers Come (2017)
- Christmas Daydreams (2020)
- You Bring Out My Best (2020)
- Close To You (2024)
- How Soon Is Now? (2024)
- Heart Of Ifugao (2025)
- Too Young To Be Old (2026)

=== Music videos ===
- Just Like A Splendid Love Song (2004)
- Lihim (2004)
- Abot Kamay (2005)
- Hanggang Kailan (Umuwi Ka Na Baby) (2005)
- Heaven Knows (This Angel Has Flown) (2005)
- Blue Moon (2006)
- Pinoy Ako (2006)
- Yakap Sa Dilim (2006)
- Ang Katulad Mong Walang Katulad (2007)
- Kailangan Kita (2018)
- Pag-ibig Sa Tabing-Dagat (2019)
- Ikaw Na Walang Hanggan (2022)
- La Bulaqueña (2024)
- Close To You (2025)
- Heart of Ifugao (2025)

== Awards and achievements ==
Year	Award giving body	Category	Nominated work	Results
2004	NU Rock Awards	Best New Artist	—N/a	Won
2005	NU Rock Awards	Artist of the Year	—N/a	Won
2005	NU Rock Awards	Rising Sun Award	—N/a	Won
2005	NU Rock Awards	Vocalist of the Year	(for Mcoy Fundales)	Nominated
2005	NU Rock Awards	Song of the Year	"Hanggang Kailan"	Nominated
2005	NU Rock Awards	Album of the Year	"Strike Whilst the Iron Is Hot"	Nominated
2006	MYX Music Awards	Favorite Song	"Pinoy Ako"	Nominated
2006	MYX Music Awards	Favorite Group	—N/a	Nominated
2006	MYX Music Awards	Favorite Media Soundtrack	"Pinoy Ako"	Nominated
2007	MYX Music Awards	Favorite Remake	"Yakap sa Dilim"	Nominated
2007	NU Rock Awards	Album of the Year	"Moonlane Gardens"	Won
2007	NU Rock Awards	Best Album Packaging	Sarah Gaugler and Clementine for "Moonlane Gardens"	Won
2007	NU Rock Awards	Producer of the Year	Robert Javier and Jonathan Ong for "Moonlane Gardens"	Nominated
2008	Awit Awards	Music Video of the Year	"Ang Katulad Mong Walang Katulad"	Nominated
2008	Awit Awards	Music Video of the Year (People's Choice Award)	"Ang Katulad Mong Walang Katulad"	Nominated

Awards
Preceded by Sugarfree	NU Rock Awards; Best New Artist; 2004	Succeeded by Pedicab
