= Kean Cipriano =

Filipino actor and musician (born 1987)

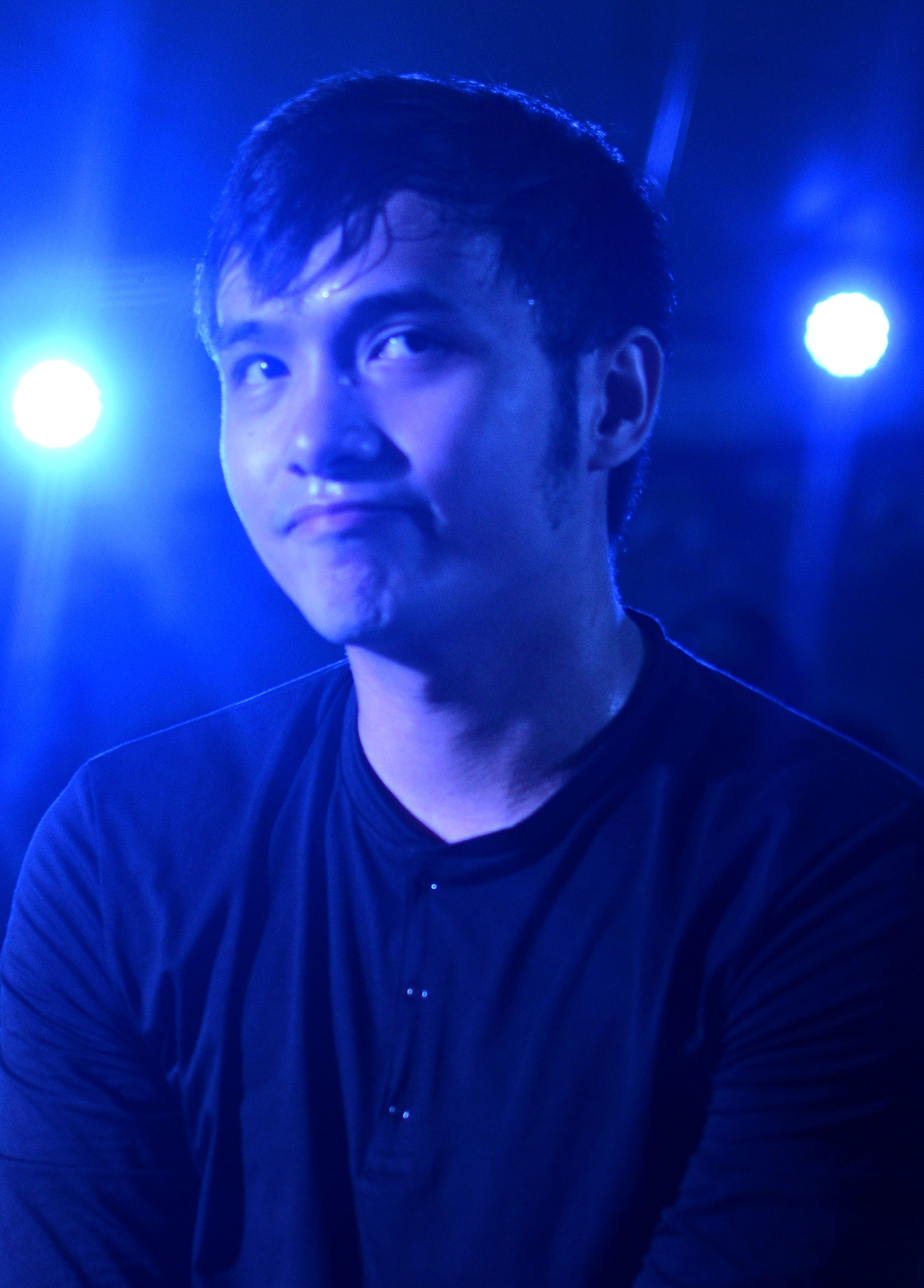
- Cipriano in 2017
- Born: Kean Edward Uson Cipriano; June 11, 1987 (age 39); Pasig, Metro Manila, Philippines
- Occupation: Singer • songwriter • actor • music video director • musician
- Years active: 1995–present
- Spouse: Chynna Ortaleza (m. 2015)
- Children: 2
- Musical career
- Genres: Alternative rock, pop rock, Pinoy rock
- Instruments: Vocals, guitar, drums
- Labels: Sony Music Philippines (2006–2012); Universal Records (2012–2017); Soupstar Entertainment (2006–2017); Sindikato Productions/Callalily Entertainment/O/C Records (2017–present)

Kean Edward Uson Cipriano (born June 11, 1987) is a Filipino singer, songwriter, actor, music video director, and musician. He first gained prominence as the lead vocalist of the pop-rock band Callalily, and is the founder of the independent record label O/C Records. As an actor, Cipriano is known for his performances in the acclaimed films Ang Babae sa Septic Tank (2011) and Bar Boys (2017).

He has received several accolades throughout his career, including a FAMAS Award, PMPC Star Awards for both music and film, and an Eddys Award.

== Early life and education ==
Kean Edward Uson Cipriano was born on June 11, 1987, in Pasig, Metro Manila. He has two younger brothers, Keno and Keano. He completed his high school education at Lourdes School of Mandaluyong. Cipriano later studied at the University of Santo Tomas Conservatory of Music and also pursued business administration at the Entrepreneurs School of Asia.

== Career ==
=== 2005–2009: Early career and rise to fame ===
Cipriano first appeared on ABS-CBN's noontime show Magandang Tanghali Bayan, where he won the "Luv Idol" segment alongside Trixie Cacho.

In 2005, Cipriano became the lead vocalist of the pop-rock band Callalily, which rose to prominence with the release of their debut album Destination XYZ in 2006. The band gained mainstream popularity in the mid-2000s with hit singles such as "Magbalik", "Stars," and "Pansamantala," which received significant airplay on local music channels like MYX.

=== 2010–2015: Acting breakthrough and continued success ===
In 2010, Cipriano made his acting debut in the TV5 youth-oriented series BFGF, opposite Alex Gonzaga, followed by a role in the sitcom Hapi Together.

In 2011, he starred in the critically acclaimed independent film Ang Babae sa Septic Tank, portraying Rainier, an ambitious director. For his performance, he received a nomination for Breakthrough Performance by an Actor at the 9th Golden Screen Awards. He also appeared in the blockbuster comedy The Unkabogable Praybeyt Benjamin and the horror film San Lazaro. Later that year, he reunited with Gonzaga for the TV5 drama series P.S. I Love You. Cipriano continued performing with Callalily during this period, with the band signing a co-management contract with Viva Artists Agency.

In 2012, he appeared in the Star Cinema coming-of-age film The Reunion, alongside Enchong Dee, Enrique Gil, and Xian Lim. Cipriano maintained a freelance status, working across ABS-CBN, GMA, and TV5 before formally affiliating with ABS-CBN.

In 2013, Cipriano and Dee appeared as contestants on Kapamilya, Deal or No Deal, where they won the ₱1 million briefcase. On June, Cipriano was announced as one of the interpreters, alongside Banda ni Kleggy, for the song "Space," written by Raffy Calicdan, at the second Philippine Popular Music Festival.

In 2015, he collaborated with Nadine Lustre to interpret "Sa Ibang Mundo," a song written by Mark Villar and an entry in the 4th Philippine Popular Music Festival. Later that year, he joined the second season of Your Face Sounds Familiar as a celebrity contestant.

=== 2016-2020: O/C Records and artistic evolution ===
In 2017, Cipriano played Joshua, one of the titular characters in Bar Boys, which would eventually become a modern cult-classic film. He also had supporting roles in the 2017 Metro Manila Film Festival entry All of You and Seven Sundays.

In 2018, Cipriano and Ortaleza co-founded O/C Records, an independent label collaborating with Viva Records. The company's lineup of artist/band roster includes former IV of Spades vocalist Unique Salonga. The following year, he released his debut solo single "Eye Contact".

=== 2021-2025: Departure from Callalily and further acclaim ===
In May 2021, Cipriano released his debut solo album titled Childlike. He shared that he wrote, produced, and recorded the entire album by himself. He described the album as a reflection of his personal musical identity, saying he did not feel the need to return to his established sound and instead aimed to present what he considers his own version of pop culture and artistic roots. In the same year, Cipriano won a FAMAS Award for Best Musical Score for his arrangement on On Vodka, Beers, and Regrets. He also won several other accolades for his arrangement, including Best Musical Score at the 4th EDDYS and Movie Musical Scorer of the Year at the 37th PMPC Star Awards for Movies.

In a 2022 interview, Cipriano confirmed his departure from Callalily, citing creative and personal differences with the band. He expressed his intention to focus on solo projects and the further development of O/C Records. That same year, he released his first solo song since leaving the band, titled "Tayuman." The acoustic-ballad kundiman alternative track's title is a double entendre, referring both to Tayuman, a train station in Manila, and to a phrase meaning "If it's ever us." He followed up this single with "Paano na Tayo" before performing at his Pulso concert alongside Adie and Salonga.

In 2023, he was introduced as a regular host for the Tawag ng Tanghalan segment on It's Showtime. Later that year, Cipriano portrayed Manual Perez in Kampon, a 49th Metro Manila Film Festival entry. He also received a nomination for Best Musical Score for his arrangement on Yung Libro sa Napanood Ko at the inaugural Summer Metro Manila Film Festival.

In 2025, Cipriano confirmed that he would reprise his role as Joshua in the sequel Bar Boys: After School.

== Personal life ==
In October 2015, Cipriano confirmed his relationship with actress Chynna Ortaleza during an appearance on Tonight with Boy Abunda. The couple announced their marriage on New Year's Eve the same year. They welcomed their daughter in 2016.

On March 17, 2016, Cipriano's father, Edgie Cipriano, died due to cardiac arrest.

== Discography ==
=== Callalily ===
- Destination XYZ (2006)
- Fisheye (2008)
- Callalily (2009)
- Flower Power (2012)
- Greetings From Callalily (2015)

=== BBS (Big Band Syndicate) ===
- Ctrl+Alt+Del.Restart (2011)

=== As a solo artist ===
- Childlike (album, 2021) - O/C Records
- "Tayuman" (single; 2022)

== Filmography ==
=== Film ===
Year	Title	Role	Notes	Ref.
2011	Ang Babae sa Septic Tank	Rainier de la Cuesta	7th Cinemalaya Independent Film Festival entry	
2011	San Lazaro	Carlo Benedicto	7th Cinemalaya NETPAC Finalist	
2011	The Unkabogable Praybeyt Benjamin	Emerson Ecleo	Supporting role	
2012	Madaling Araw, Mahabang Gabi			
2012	The Reunion	Patrick "Pat" dela Torre		
2012	Of All the Things	Himself	Cameo	
2012	Kimmy Dora and the Temple of Kiyeme	Groomsman	Cameo	
2013	Bakit Hindi Ka Crush ng Crush Mo?	Edgardo Salazar		
2013	Ang Huling Henya	Dexter		
2014	Tumbang Preso	Vito		
2014	Hindi Sila Tatanda	Diwa		
2014	The Amazing Praybeyt Benjamin	Emerson Ecleo	40th Metro Manila Film Festival entry	
2014	English Only, Please	Rico	40th Metro Manila Film Festival entry	
2016	Love Is Blind	Yari Baltazar		
2016	Echorsis: Sabunutan Between Good and Evil			
2016	That Thing Called Tanga Na	CC		
2016	Mano Po 7: Chinoy	Denver Vera		
2016	Ang Babae sa Septic Tank 2: #ForeverIsNotEnough	Rainier de la Cuesta	42nd Metro Manila Film Festival entry	
2017	Seven Sundays	Jerry		
2017	Bar Boys	Joshua Zuniga	1st Pista ng Pelikulang Pilipino entry	
2017	Triptiko	John	"Musikerong John" segment	
2017	Historiographika Errata	Emilio Jacinto	13th Cinema One Originals Festival entry	
2017	All of You	Migs	43rd Metro Manila Film Festival entry	
2020	On Vodka, Beers and Regrets	Sam		
2023	Wish You Were the One	Jordan		
2023	Kampon	Manuel Perez	49th Metro Manila Film Festival entry	
2025	Bar Boys: After School	Joshua Zuniga	51st Metro Manila Film Festival entry	

=== Television ===
Year	Title	Role
2010–2011	BFGF	Prince Kean Prieto
2011–2012	P. S. I Love You	Jason Jimenez
2012	Maalaala Mo Kaya: Cellphone	Justin
2013–present	ASAP	Himself (performer)
2014	Maalaala Mo Kaya: Train	Boyfriend
2014	Ipaglaban Mo: Niloko Nyo Ako	Ely
2015	Pablo S. Gomez's Inday Bote	Jerome Santiago
2015	Maalaala Mo Kaya: Sketch Pad	Teen Rustie
2016	Dolce Amore	Alvin "Binggoy" Ibarra
2017–2020	I Can See Your Voice	SING-vestigator
2018–2019	Playhouse	Renato "Ato" Payuan
2019	FPJ's Ang Probinsyano	Migz
2023–present	It's Showtime	Himself (judge)
2023–2024	Senior High	Brandon
2024	High Street	Brandon
2025	Maalaala Mo Kaya: SIM Card	Ronald
2025–2026	Totoy Bato	Jasper

=== Music video director ===
Year	Song title	Artist
2013	"Darating"	Ney Dimaculangan, Kleggy Abaya (of Banda ni Kleggy) and Dello Gatmaitan
2013	"Pansamantala"	Callalily
2014	"Walang-Wala"	Banda ni Kleggy
2015	"Umay"	Rye Sarmiento (of 6Cyclemind/Banda ni Kleggy)
2015	"Lunod"	6Cyclemind
2015	"I Will Wait"	Gracenote (feat. Chynna Ortaleza)
2016	"Sana Mali"	Moonstar88
2017	"Pakipot, Suplado	Alexa Ilacad
2017	"Sa'n Ako Magsisimula	Callalily
2017	"Naghihintay Sa'yo"	Mark Carpio
2017	"Tanging Ikaw"	Tony Labrusca
2017	"Labo"	KZ Tandingan
2017	"Tunay Na Pag-Ibig"	Sam Milby
2018	"Litrato"	Callalily

=== Film director ===
Year	Title	Role
2015	Bakit Kasi Ako, Iba Na Lang	

== Accolades ==
Awards and NominationsAwards and nominations received by Kean Cipriano
Award	Year	Category	Nominated work	Result	Ref.
Cinema One Originals Digital Film Festival	2017	Best Supporting Actor	Historiographika Errata	Nominated	
The EDDYS	2021	Best Musical Score	On Vodka, Beers, and Regrets	Won	
FAMAS Award	2021	Best Musical Score	On Vodka, Beers, and Regrets	Won	
Gawad Urian Award	2012	Best Actor (Pinakamahusay na Pangunahing Aktor)	Ang Babae Sa Septic Tank	Nominated	
Gawad Urian Award	2021	Best Music (Pinakamahusay na Musika) (shared with Brain Coat)	On Vodka, Beers, and Regrets	Nominated	
Golden Screen Awards	2011	Best Original Song (shared with Jonathan Manalo, Ney Dimaculangan, Tutti Caringal)	RPG Metanoia ("Kaya Mo")	Nominated	
Golden Screen Awards	2012	Breakthrough Performance by an Actor	Ang Babae Sa Septic Tank	Nominated	
Metro Manila Film Festival	2010	Best Original Theme Song (shared with Protein Shake and Ney Dimaculangan)	RPG Metanoia ("Kaya Mo")	Won	
Metro Manila Film Festival	2014	Best Supporting Actor	English Only, Please	Nominated	
Metro Manila Film Festival	2016	Best Actor	Ang Babae sa Septic Tank 2: Forever is Not Enough	Nominated	
Pista ng Pelikulang Pilipino	2019	Best Musical Score	G!	Nominated	
PMPC Star Awards for Music	2011	Music Video of the Year	RPG Metanoia ("Kaya Mo")	Nominated	
PMPC Star Awards for Music	2015	Male Rock Artist of the Year	Happy Together	Won	
PMPC Star Awards for Music	2015	Duo/Group Artist of the Year (shared with Eunice Jorge)	Happy Together	Nominated	
PMPC Star Awards for Movies	2022	Movie Musical Scorer of the Year (shared with Brain Coat)	On Vodka, Beers, and Regrets	Won	
PMPC Star Awards for Movies	2022	Movie Original Theme Song of the Year(shared with Pappel)	On Vodka, Beers, and Regrets "("F**king Circumstance")	Nominated	
Summer Metro Manila Film Festival	2023	Best Musical Score	Yung Libro sa Napanood Ko	Nominated	
