= Lily discography =

- Studio albums: 5
- Compilation albums: 1
- Singles: 16

This is the discography of OPM music band Lily.

== Albums ==
Year	Album title	Certifications
2006	Destination XYZ: Released: 17 July 2006; Label: Sony BMG Philippines	Platinum
2008	Fisheye: Released: 7 March 2008; Label: Sony BMG Philippines	–
2009	Callalily: Released: 12 October 2009; Label: Sony BMG Philippines	–
2012	Flower Power: Released: 12 October 2012; Label: Universal Records	–
2015	Greetings From Callalily: Released: 23 November 2015; Label: Universal Records	–

=== Other albums ===
Year	Title
2008	Sakto Sa Pasko Collaboration

== Singles ==
=== All singles ===
Year	Title	Album
2006	Stars	Destination XYZ
2007	Take My Hand	Destination XYZ
2007	Magbalik	Destination XYZ
2007	Pasan	Destination XYZ
2007	Insane	Destination XYZ
2007	Sanctuary	Destination XYZ
2008	Susundan	Fisheye
2008	Ako'y Babalik	Fisheye
2009	Hintay	Fisheye
2009	Nananaginip	Callalily
2010	Gabay	Callalily
2010	Liwanag	Callalily
2012	Pasasalamat	Flower Power
2013	HKM	Flower Power
2013	Pansamantala	Flower Power
2015	Bitter Song	Greetings From Callalily
2016	Is This Love	Greetings From Callalily
2017	San Ako Nagsisimila	Greetings From Callalily

=== Other singles ===
Year	Title	Album
2008	Eto Na Ang Summer	
2008	Malamig	Sakto Sa Pasko Collaboration
2012	Minsan	The Reunion: An Eraserheads Tribute Album
