= BFGF (TV series) =

- Genre: Teen drama
- Created by: Associated Broadcasting Company
- Directed by: Bb. Joyce Bernal
- Starring: Alex Gonzaga; Kean Cipriano
- Theme music composer: Callalily
- Opening theme: "Yakap"
- Country of origin: Philippines
- Original language: Filipino
- No. of episodes: 43

Production
- Executive producer: Manuel V. Pangilinan
- Production location: Philippines
- Running time: 1 hour

Original release
- Network: Associated Broadcasting Company (TV5)
- Release: April 11, 2010 – January 30, 2011

Related
- Lipgloss

BFGF is a Philippine weekly romantic comedy teen drama series broadcast by TV5. It premiered on April 11, 2010 and ended on January 30, 2011. Directed by Bb. Joyce Bernal, it stars Alex Gonzaga and Kean Cipriano of Callalily.

== First season ==
The story begins with Claring being hired by her grandmother's former employer to be the nanny for his son. Expecting a cute little child, Claring got the surprise of her life when she found out that she will be a nanny to a college student named Kean. The first season revolves around Claring and Kean getting to know each other, hating each other and later on building their friendship.

== Second season ==
The second season starts with Claring being enrolled with the same college with Kean and his friends. In this season, Kean and Claring are getting more confused with their relationship as friends. It gets more complicated as Claring accepts exclusive dating status with her longtime suitor Jackson and Kean's former girlfriend Chanel tries to win him back.

== Third season ==
The third season starts with Claring getting a new job, so she can resign from being Kean's nanny, because she cannot stay longer with Kean because of his upcoming marriage with Chanel. Kean believes that Chanel is pregnant with his child. When Claring finds a job, she meets Atong, who shows interest for her. Claring decides to give up on Kean. And when Kean learns that Chanel is pregnant with his friend Chito's child, he decides to soul-search. Being away for a month and knowing that Claring loves him, he realizes that he must win back Claring, but in this time he meets his rival, Atong, his lookalike, cool, bisaya and an heir of a big airlines. Both of them will do their best to win Claring. But, when Claring chooses Kean and Atong tries to win her back, will she stay with Kean or switch to Atong?

== Final season ==
Atong had an accident. As he recovers, Claring stays by his side unaware of Kean being jealous and worried about her. Kean is having trouble with his upcoming album launch, but still doing well with promotions and recordings around the country. Claring now longs to be a flight attendant. Claring feels betrayed after hearing a promotion on the radio of Kean's band that he is indeed in Manila. Kean is unaware that his lie hurt Claring. As Claring and Kean try to keep it together in their professions will their love for one another stay stronger as they are headed to success?

== Cast ==
=== Main cast ===
- Alex Gonzaga as Ma. Claridad "Claring" P. Malinao – a young bisaya who takes her journey to Manila to become a yaya and to fulfill her dreams to be a flight attendant, but unexpectedly falls in love with her ward, Kean. She is naive and plain-looking but has a strong and bubbly personality.
- Kean Cipriano as Prince Kean Prieto – A brat, heartthrob-rocker, rich guy who came from the United States. He had a bad experience from his mother's death and has a bad relationship with his father. Hot-tempered, he always makes fun of Claring, but later on falls in love with her.

=== Supporting cast ===
- Pio as Jackson – Claring's textmate for two years. Later on becomes Claring's M.U. A certified jejemon but sweet and respectful.
- Chris Cayzer as Wency – Kean's friend. A good son and reliable. She sees Claring as strong and sometimes helps Claring with her problems.
- Nico Ibaviosa as Chito – Kean's playboy friend. He has a hidden affection for Chanel and is the real father of Chanel's baby.
- Zyrus Desamparado as Ely – Kean's friend. The naughtiest and sometimes his plans have ended up with another problem.
- Dianne Medina as Chanel Ann Laguardia – The ultimate antagonist in the story. Sossy, rich, pretty and mean. She is Kean's ex-girlfriend, and she will do everything to make Kean go back to her. She hates Claring and she will do everything to get rid of Claring.
- Louise delos Reyes as Hermes – Chanel's best friend. She always helps Chanel to do evil things but in exchange for expensive bags. She is slow, bubbly yet very pretty. In Season 1, she flew to America to pursue her Hollywood dreams.
- John Manalo as Techno – BG's best friend who has in love with her for years, but at the end of the season 1 he goes to America to study.
- JR de Guzman as Taq – BG's best friend and his longtime suitor, he is handsome and reliable.
- Alyana Asistio as BG – Kean's younger sister. She always helps Kean with all his problems. She is close with Kean and she will do everything to protect their family.
- Anykka Asistio as Cassandra "Cassie" Prieto – Kean and BG's half sister. In season 1 she is hated by BG, but by the end of season one, they became best friends and she always helps Kean and BG.
- Angelo Patrimonio as Martin – Chanel's other suitor who made Kean jealous and resulted in a fight on Chanel's 18th Birthday party.
- Ramon Christopher as Victor – Kean's father. He have a bad relation with his son because of his mistresses, her wife death, and forcing Kean to get a business course instead of supporting kean's dream, being a musician.
- Tuesday Vargas as Snow White – Claring's best friend and coworker in Kean's house. She always supports Claring and makes jokes. She was only in the first season.
- Lemuel Belaro of Callalily as Lemuel – Kean's classmate in music. He is with Kean on campus and in gimmicks.
- Tatsi Jamnague of Callalily as Tatsi – Kean's classmate in music. He is with Kean on campus and in gimmicks.
- Aaron Ricafrente of Callalily as Aaron – Kean's classmate in music. He is with Kean on campus and in gimmicks.
- Caloy Alde as Manong Paeng – Kean's driver.
- Rheasol Hiballes as Romana – Kean's maid. She always bullies, nags and shouts at Claring.
- Carlo Cannu as Greg Chan – when Hermes left, he was the replacement. He is gay, but he always helps Chanel and loves news that can increase his popularity.
- Teri Onor as Aling Diana Rose – Jackson's mother and the new maid at Kean's house.
- Alwyn Uytingco as Atong – Agaton Altamerano IV - as the new friend-suitor of Claring, and he is also considered as a threat to Kean, for he is a Visayan and the heir of Alta Airways, where Claring works.

== Reception ==
The series became a hit when TV 5 launched it as an afternoon Teen Sunday Program, like the hit television series Lipgloss. It also made global airbase through Facebook, Twitter, and Most Watched on Blog sites, and made Alex Gonzaga a New Afternoon Star and Main Character in 2010. It has also released a BFGF CD from the Hit Teen Weekly Series, some songs include Calla Lily Hits, Kiss Jane's Kahit Na and Moonstar 88, and many more.

== Album ==
In August 2010, TV5 decided to release an album a soundtrack to the hit TV series.

== Soundtrack ==
The soundtrack features Callalily hits Gabay and Hintay. It also includes songs that every teenager could relate to like scenes from the show: Gusto Ko Lang Ng Girlfriend by Eevee; Kiss Jane's Kahit Na; Nababaliw by Letter Day Story; Moonstar88's Tadhana; and Gusto Na Kita by 6Cyclemind and the said soundtrack is released August 2010 by Sony Music.
