= Lasik (song) =

Single by Hey June!

from the album Curiosity Killed the Cat
- Language: Filipino
- Released: April 21, 2023
- Recorded: 2023
- Genre: Pop rock; indie rock; OPM
- Length: 3:45
- Label: Island Records
- Songwriter: Herbert Hernandez
- Producers: Darwin Hernandez; Eunice Jorge

Hey June! singles chronology
"Orasan" (2023)	"Lasik" (2023)	"Everybody Wants To Rule The World (Note: Cover version of the song by Tears for Fears.)" (2024)

Live performance cover
- 2024 Live performance cover

Music video
- "Lasik" on YouTube "Lasik (Narrative version)" on YouTube

Live performance
- "Lasik" (Live) on YouTube

"Lasik" (stylized in all caps) is a song recorded by Filipino band Hey June! from their debut album Curiosity Killed the Cat (2023). It was released on April 21, 2023, by Island Records as their third single overall. The song was written by Herbert Hernandez and collaboratively produced by Darwin Hernandez (the brother of Herbert), and Eunice Jorge of Gracenote.

Since its release in 2023, "Lasik" became a sleeper hit, gaining widespread popularity in 2025 on TikTok and Instagram. The song was featured by notable personalities, including the girl group Bini, actress Sharlene San Pedro, and musicians Zild and Adie. It also appeared in content by Pinoy Big Brother: Celebrity Collab Edition alumni Shuvee Etrata and Bianca de Vera.

== Background and release ==
In June 2021, Hey June! was formed during the height of the COVID-19 pandemic. A year later, they released the introduction song "Just A Hit" and debut single "Panahon" (lit. 'Panahon') in 2022 during the post-pandemic period, followed by "Lugar Kung S'an" (lit. 'A Place Where'). In 2023, the band released their debut album Curiosity Killed the Cat, which included the single "Lasik", released on April 21 under Island Records.

"Lasik" along with "Orasan" (lit. 'Clock') and "Asan Ang Gana Ko" (lit. 'Where's My Energy'), is included in their debut album. The album was previously named one of Billboard Philippines' Top 15 Albums and Extended Plays of 2023, with production support from Gracenote vocalist Eunice Jorge.

== Composition ==
"Lasik" is set in the key of B minor, with a tempo of 78 beats per minute, and runs for three minutes and forty-five seconds. It was written and composed by Moonstar88 and 6cyclemind guitarist Herbert Hernandez, and produced by Darwin Hernandez under Velvet Playground and Eunice Jorge.

== Music video ==
The official music video for "Lasik" was released by Hey June!'s YouTube channel on April 30, 2023, nine days after the song's release. The video was shot at Dogzilla Studio and directed by Treb Monteras II. In 2025, a narrative music video for the song was released starring Will Ashley.

== Reception ==
"Lasik"
A 22-second sample of "Lasik" from their debut album Curiosity Killed the Cat (2023) was described by Elijah Pareño of Rolling Stone Philippines as an "ear-catching opener", highlighting the first verse with the line, "Shet, nasaan ang aking salamin".

"Lasik" received favorable reviews from local publications, which praised its energetic sound. Hannah Mallorca of the Philippine Daily Inquirer described the song as telling the story of a persona whose blurry vision clears after meeting a potential lover. Elijah Pareño of Rolling Stone Philippines described the song as having a "sticky chorus" and an ear-catching opener with the line, "Shet, nasaan ang aking salamin" accompanied by fast punk rhythms that send listeners into a frenzy. Pareño noted that the track demonstrated the band's staying power, relying not on fleeting hype but on its lasting impact beyond social media. He added that the band's debut album Curiosity Killed the Cat offers more than a single viral hook, describing "Lasik" as a track built for rediscovery and longevity.

== Credits and personnel ==
Credits are adapted from Apple Music.

- Hey June! — performer

=== Songwriter and production ===
- Herbert Hernandez – songwriting
- Eunice Jorge – producer
- Darwin Hernandez (under Velvet Playground) – producer
- Emil Dela Rosa – mastering engineer

== Chart performance ==
By June 2025, "Lasik" reached the number 1 spot on the Spotify Philippines Viral 50 chart, and had accumulated over 5 million streams. In early July 2025, the song also entered the Billboard Philippines charts, debuting at No. 39 on the Philippines Hot 100 and No. 20 on the Top Philippine Songs chart.

== Charts ==
Chart performance for "Lasik"
Chart (2025)	Peak position
Philippines Hot 100 (Billboard Philippines)	39
Philippines (Top Philippine Songs)	20
