= Hey June! =

Filipino rock band

- Genres: Indie rock; pop rock; alternative rock
- Years active: 2021–present
- Labels: Island Records; Soupstar Entertainment
- Members: Jim Mase; Coey Ballesteros; Aci Fodra
- Past members: Earl Paglinawan
- Website: Official website

Hey June! (stylized in all caps) is a Filipino indie rock band formed in 2021. The band consists of Jim Mase (vocals/guitar), Coey Ballesteros (bass), and Aci Fodra (drums). The band first gained attention with their debut single "Panahon" (lit. 'Season'), was released in 2022. Their name was inspired by the month of their formation.

In 2023, the band released the single "Lasik" from their debut album Curiosity Killed the Cat. The song became a sleeper hit in 2025, gaining widespread popularity on TikTok and Instagram. The track reached the top of the Spotify Philippines Viral 50 chart and surpassed five million streams. It also entered the Billboard Philippines charts in early July 2025, debuting at number 39 on the Philippines Hot 100 and number 20 on the Top Philippine Songs chart.

== History ==
=== 2021–2022: Formation and Panahon ===
Hey June! was formed in June 2021 during the height of the COVID-19 pandemic. The band was formed by Soupstar Music through the recommendation of friends and family which resulted in Jim Mase and Earl Paglinawan joining the group. Coey Ballesteros who was a neighbor of Darwin Hernandez' brother named Herbert Hernandez (guitarist of the bands Moonstar88 and 6cyclemind), joined as bassist while Aci Fodra - a Velvet Playground music student became the drummer. Their first meeting as a band was via Zoom due to the pandemic. By the time they met in person, the initial "awkwardness" had faded and their chemistry had formed. Fodra said that they became close right away.

The band released their introduction single "Just A Hit" in late 2021, followed by the debut single "Panahon" (Time) in early 2022. According to NME, "Panahon" explores themes of timing and emotional reflection. Its accompanying music video was noted for its nostalgic atmosphere and coming-of-age narrative. They would later release "Lugar Kung S'an" (The Place Where) in the same year, though it would be later removed from their streaming platforms in 2025.

In October 2022, the band officially signed with Island Records Philippines, a division of Universal Music Group (UMG Philippines).

=== 2023–2025: Curiosity Killed the Cat ===
On November 9, 2023, Hey June! released their debut album Curiosity Killed the Cat under Island Records Philippines. The band released multiple singles including "Sino Mali" (Who is Wrong), "Orasan" (Clock), "Lasik", "Biglang Taob" (Suddenly Upset) and "Asan ang Gana Ko" (Where is My Enthusiasm) as carrier singles. The album was produced by Darwin Hernandez and Eunice Jorge of Gracenote.

The album was included in Billboard Philippines' list of "Top 15 Albums and EPs of 2023". The band gained wider recognition after winning the People's Voice Award for Breakthrough Artist at the 36th Awit Awards. They were also nominated for Best Performance by a Group and Best Alternative Recording for "Sino Mali".

In 2024, the band released a single cover of "Everybody Wants to Rule the World" by Tears for Fears.

Hey June! embarked on an active series of live performances across Metro Manila in 2025 to promote their album. On April 5, they performed at the iconic UP Fair: REV Music Festival held at the UP Sunken Garden, sharing the stage with major acts such as Imago and Gracenote. On May 8, the band performed at Hardstop Productions' held at Imajin in Marikina City. The event featured a lineup of emerging independent acts, including 12th Street, ischi, Eliza Maturan, Kenaniah, and SHANNi. In June, the band headlined the Malaya Music Fest 2k25 at Okada Manila, sharing the stage with acts such as Kamikazee, Sandwich, Silent Sanctuary, and Earl Agustin, in celebration of the festival's 5th anniversary. In the same month, they single "Lasik" reached the number one spot on the Spotify Philippines Viral 50 chart. A narrative music video, starring Will Ashley in the lead role, was released on August 13.

=== 2026–present: Realidad ===
In 2026, the band released the single "Sabihin Mo Lang" (Just Tell Me). The song was released ahead of the band's upcoming second studio album, which the group later announced was planned for release later that same year.

They subsequently released the singles "Pagmamahal" (Love), "Kung May Problema Ka" (If You Have a Problem),, and "It's Not the Same as It Used to Be." All of these tracks are part of their sophomore album, titled Realidad (Reality), released on September 28, 2026.

They also released their cover of the Smokey Mountain song "Ai Shite Ruyo" (I Love You), which features Ballesteros sharing lead vocals with Mase.

== Artistry and influences ==
Hey June! described their sound as a fusion of nostalgic pop-rock sound with a modern, youthful edge. (Note: Attributed to multiple references:) They developed a distinct sound, describing it as unconcerned with following trends, stating, "We've been very experimental with our sounds. Our creative juices are still very wild."

According to frontman Jim Mase, his band members come from different musical backgrounds, each with their own set of influences. While their individual influences differ, they have learned to work together creatively. Mase shared that his members are fans of the Eraserheads, citing the iconic band as a major influence on their music.

== Band members ==
Current members

- James Ligtas "Jim" Mase – vocals, rhythm guitar, synth (2021-present)
- Chloe Anne "Coey" Ballesteros – bass, vocals (2021-present)
- Albert Cian "Aci" G. Fodra – drums, backing vocals (2021-present)

Former members

- Earl Andrei P. Paglinawan – vocals, lead guitar (2021-2023, touring 2024)

== Accolades ==
Award	Year	Category	Recipient(s)	Result	Ref.
Awit Awards	2023	People's Voice Award for Breakthrough Artist	Hey June!	Won	
Awit Awards	2023	Best Performance by a Group	Hey June!	Nominated	
Awit Awards	2023	Best Alternative Recording	"Sino Mali"	Nominated	

== Discography ==
=== Studio albums ===
List of studio albums, with release date, label, and format shown
Title	Details	Ref.
Curiosity Killed the Cat	Released: November 9, 2023; Label: Island Records; Format: digital download, streaming, vinyl LP	
Realidad	Released: September 28, 2026; Label: Island Records; Format: digital download, streaming	

=== Singles ===
List of singles, showing year released, selected chart positions, and associated albums
Title	Year	Peak chart positions		Album	Ref.
Title	Year	PHL	PHL Top	Album	Ref.
"Just A Hit"	2021	—	—	Non-album single	
"Panahon"	2022	—	—	Non-album single	
"Lugar Kung S'an" (Note: Removed from streaming platforms in 2025)	2022	—	—	Non-album single	
"Sino Mali"	2022	—	—	Curiosity Killed the Cat	
"Orasan"	2023	—	—	Curiosity Killed the Cat	
"Lasik"	2023	39	20	Curiosity Killed the Cat	
"Everybody Wants To Rule The World" (Note: Cover version of the song by Tears for Fears.)	2024	—	—	Non-album single	
"Sabihin Mo Lang"	2026	—	—	Realidad	
"Pagmamahal"	2026	—	—	Realidad	
"Kung May Problema Ka"	2026	—	—	Realidad	
"Ai Shite Ruyo" (Note: Cover version of the song by the Smokey Mountain.)	2026	—	—	non-album single	
"It’s Not the Same as It Used to Be"	2026	—	—	Realidad	
