= Migraine (disambiguation) =

Migraine is a debilitating condition characterized by headaches and nausea.

Migraine may also refer to:

- Migraine (book), a book by neurologist Oliver Sacks
- Project Migraine, a post-World War II U.S. Navy program to convert fleet submarines into radar picket submarines
- "Migraine" (song), a 2007 Tagalog-language song by Moonstar88
- "Migraine", a song by Twenty One Pilots from the album Vessel
- Migraine, a record label from NYC, set up by Teenage Jesus and the Jerks
- "Migraine", a song by Jaydes from the EP Romanticism
