= Dimaculangan =

Dimaculangan is a Filipino surname. Notable people with the surname include:

- Ney Dimaculangan (born 1982), Filipino musician
- Rhea Dimaculangan (born 1991), Filipina volleyball player
