= Ney Dimaculangan =

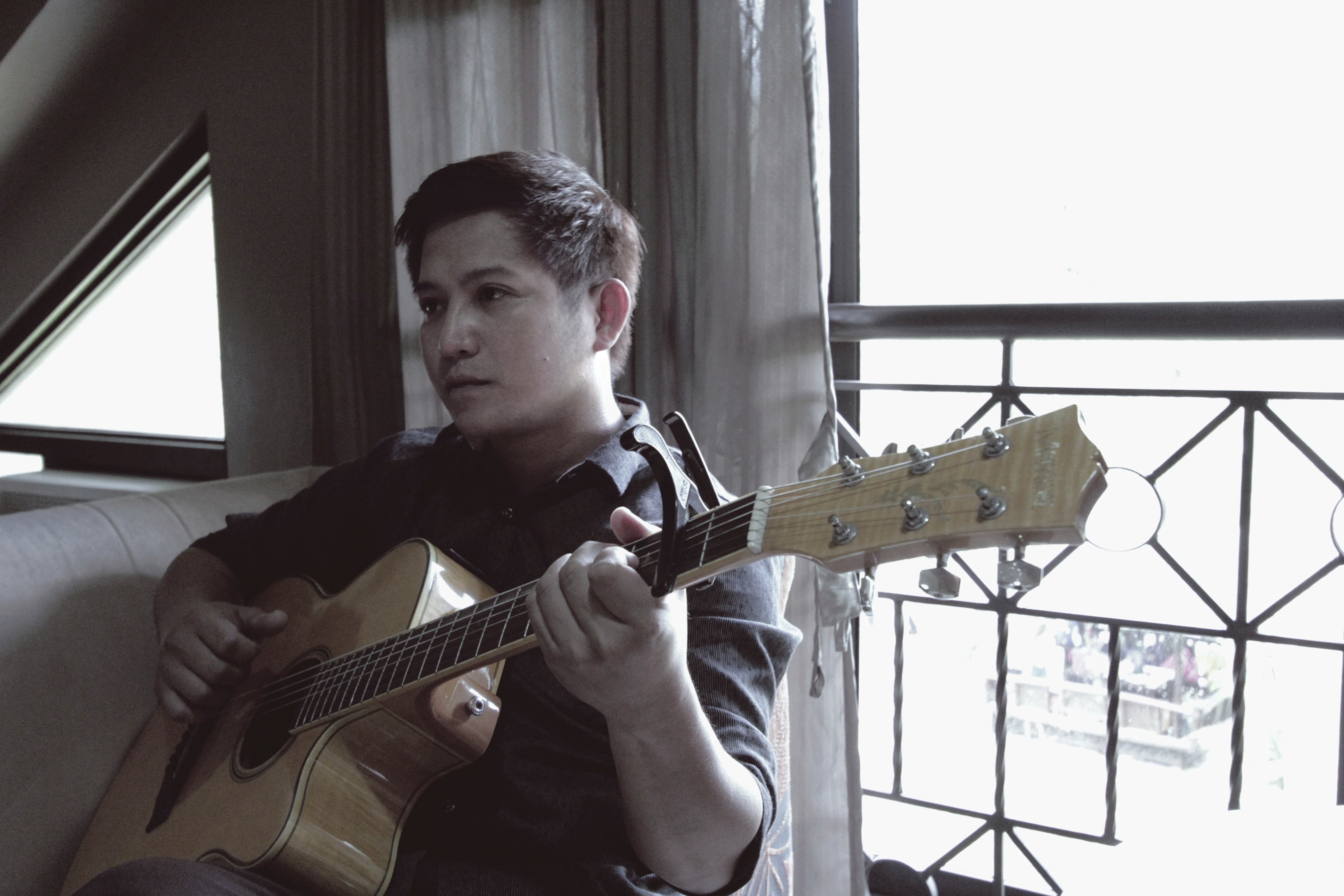

Background information
- Also known as: Ney Dimaculangan
- Born: Rhoneil Dimaculangan; Tarlac
- Genres: Alternative rock Pop rock Pinoy rock
- Instruments: Vocals, Guitar, Harmonica
- Years active: 2001–present
- Labels: Sony Music (2002–2010); Star Music (2011–2012); Alpha Music (2015–present)
- Member of: Orient Pearl
- Formerly of: 6cyclemind, Ney

Rhoneil "Ney" M. Dimaculangan is a Filipino musician known as the former vocalist and songwriter of 6cyclemind. He eventually pursued a solo career before fronting his own namesake band Ney. In November 2024, he became the lead singer of Orient Pearl.

== Personal life ==
At the age of 10, he started as the vocalist of the band "Angel in Disguise". Later on, transferred to Manila to pursue his music degree at Centro Escolar University Conservatory of Music. By 1996, 6cyclemind was formed, with Ney Dimaculangan and original members namely Gilbert Magat, Chuck Isidro, Bobby Canamo and Ryan Sarmiento. Gilbert Magat later left the group and was replaced by Tutti Caringal of Protein Shake.

Dimaculangan has collaborated with well known artists in the music industry like Cookie Chua, Francis Magalona, Raymund Marasigan, Ryan Cayabyab, Yeng Constantino, Dello and to name a few.

Aside from being a musician, Dimaculangan also works as a Sound Engineer, Music Producer, Song Arranger, Composer and Video Editor

Dimaculangan's musical influences include Rivermaya, Eraserheads, The Beatles, Matchbox Twenty, Live, and Nirvana.

== Career ==
=== 6cyclemind ===
He has been a decade leading the vocals with the band. He also writes or produces songs for other artists. They had various product endorsements like Tanduay and GBX shoes. They were together on tours. They acquire numerous nominations from award giving bodies which paved their way in the music scene and recognized as Viewer's Choice Awards for Song of the Year 2006 for the hit song Sandalan and Artist of the Year 2006, ASAP Pop Viewer's Choice Awards for Pop Band Artist for 2009 and 2010, Favorite Group and Favorite Music Video for their song Kasalanan in Myx Music Awards. They sang the theme song for ABS-CBN Foundation S4S (Schools for Schools) and were given a plaque of appreciation for that certain contribution. Apart from reaching out for the people, their song "Sandalan" and "Walang Iwanan" were made as the theme song for Manny Villar's political advertisement for presidency. Unfortunately, they removed him as a vocalist and was replaced by their drummer Tutti Caringal. Ney signed a contract under Star Records.

=== Solo ===
Ney is the voice behind the theme song of ABS-CBN's fantaserye Imortal, Walang Hanggan together with Yeng Constantino. Ney released his album Ney Dmac under Star Records. A fusion of OPM alternative pop rock with songs like "Sana", "Velvet Skies", "Tagapagligtas", "Shut Up", "October" and his newest single "Ligaw" with a bonus track of Filipino 3-D animated film, RPG Metanoia, Kaya Mo and won as the best theme song for 2010's Metro Manila Film Festival and Favorite Media Soundtrack in Myx Music Awards 2011. He was also a drummer of the indie band Skyway Traffic but later on left the band to work as a solo artist. In 2010, he became one of the judges in the noontime talent show Showtime but was evicted during the eviction day. In 2013, he participated on the second Philippine Popular Music Festival as the interpreter for singer-songwriter Johnoy Danao's self-composed song entry "Kung 'Di Man".

=== NEY ===
By 2012, he formed a new band which was named after him (stylized in all caps) and they've released an independent single entitled Napapanahon Come 2016, they've closed a record deal with Alpha Music Corporation and release an album named after their previous independent release. Included in the new record are 9 original cuts plus an acoustic recording of Napapanahon.

== Discography ==
=== With 6cyclemind ===
Albums

- Permission to Shine (2003)
- Panorama (2005)
- Home (2007)
- Fiesta! Magsasaya Ang Lahat (2007)
- Project: 6cyclemind (2009)

=== Solo ===
Album

- Ney DMac (2011)

=== NEY ===
- Napapanahon (2016)

== Singles ==
=== With 6 Cycle Mind ===
- Biglaan
- Paba
- Sige
- Nalilito
- Can't Let Go
- Sandalan
- Feels Good to be You and Me
- Home
- I
- Trip
- Umaasa
- Prinsesa
- Upside Down
- Dinamayan
- Magsasaya
- Aaminin
- Gusto Na Kita
- Alagaan Mo Sya
- Saludo
- Walang Iwanan
- Kasalanan (feat. Gloc 9 and Wendell Garcia of Pupil/Archipelago)
- Kung Wala Na Nga (feat. Yeng Constantino and Kean Cipriano of Callalily)

=== Solo album ===
- NAPAPANAHON (New trending song for 2015)
- Walang Hanggan (feat. Yeng Constantino)
- Ligaw
- Shut Up
- Velvet Skies
- Tagapagligtas
- Sama-sama
- October
- Fall out
- Himig mo
- Hopeless
- Sana

=== Special Projects ===
- Kailan with Yeng Constantino (Remake of Eheads original, Soundtrack from Reunion the movie)
- Darating with Dello and Kleggy (special collaboration under Big Band Syndicate project)
- Sabik Sa'Yo ASOP Year 4 2015

=== NEY ===
- Habag
- Harana
- Jamsimanyo (Sandali Lang)
- Positibo
- Huling Sagot
