= Soupstar Entertainment =

Philippine record label

- Trade name: Soupstar Music
- Company type: Private
- Industry: Music, Talent management
- Founded: 2000; 26 years ago
- Headquarters: 26 Velvet St. Concepcion Dos, Marikina, Metro Manila, Philippines
- Area served: Philippines
- Key people: Darwin Hernandez (founder)
- Website: soupstar.ph

Soupstar Entertainment, d/b/a Soupstar Music, is a Philippine-based entertainment company. Founded in 2000 by Darwin Hernandez, the company focuses on its music business both as an independent music label and as an artist management agency.

== History ==
Soupstar was founded in 2000 by Darwin Hernandez, the manager of 6cyclemind. Since then, it has been handling a number of musical acts particularly on longtime veteran bands including 6cyclemind, Moonstar88, Sandwich, Imago and others.

== List of artists ==
=== Current ===
- 6cyclemind
- Banda ni Kleggy
- Better Days
- Gracenote
- Hey June!
- Imago
- Jem
- Kiss n' Tell
- Mizael
- Moonstar88
- Sandwich
- Teeth
- The Vowels They Orbit
- Ultracombo (Raymund Marasigan and Buddy Zabala)
- WE GOT

=== Former ===
- BBS (Big Band Syndicate)
- Callalily
- Pedicab
