= Van Ommen =

Van Ommen is a Dutch surname. Notable people with the surname include:

- Erik van Ommen (born 1956), Dutch painter and graphic artist
- Jörg van Ommen (born 1962), German racing driver
- Acel Van Ommen (born 1976), Filipina singer and songwriter
