= Permission to Shine =

Studio album by 6cyclemind
- Released: 2003
- Genre: Alternative rock; pop
- Length: 57:02
- Label: Musiko; BMG Pilipinas

6cyclemind chronology
Permission to Shine (2003)	Panorama (2005)

Singles from Permission to Shine
- 1. "Biglaan" Released: 2003; 2. "Paba" Released: 2003; 3. "Nalilito" Released: 2004; 4. "Sige" Released: 2004

Permission to Shine is the debut studio album by the Filipino band 6cyclemind. It has 12 tracks and was released under BMG Records Pilipinas in 2003. The carrier single "Biglaan" reached number one on the NU107 and RX 93.1 charts and the acoustic version charted on 97.1 LS. This was immediately followed by the single "Paba", which topped 99.5 RT, and "Nalilito". In 2004 the band released their fourth single "Sige". The song debuted at the NU107 Midnight Countdown at number four.

== Track listing ==
All tracks are written by Hernandez, except where noted

Permission to Shine track listing
No.	Title	Writer(s)	Length
1.	"Wait or Go"		3:27
2.	"Paba"		3:59
3.	"Fly"	Carlos D. Isidro	3:59
4.	"Gaya ng Noon"	Ryan Sarmiento	3:45
5.	"Biglaan"	Hernandez, Sarmiento	4:46
6.	"Forever I'm Sorry"		4:16
7.	"Sige"		5:13
8.	"Tunay"		5:26
9.	"Fall Out"	Rhoneil M. Dimaculangan	4:53
10.	"Sentimental Garbage"	Dimacalugan, Raimund Marasigan	4:10
11.	"Biglaan" (acoustic version)	Hernandez, Sarmiento	5:27
12.	"Nalilito"	Hernandez, Sarmiento	7:42

== Personnel ==
6cyclemind

- Ney Dimaculangan – lead vocals
- Rye Sarmiento – guitars
- Chuck Isidro – lead guitars
- Bob Cañamo – bass
- Gilbert Magat – drums and percussion

Additional musician

- Arnold Cabalaza – keyboards on "Biglaan" and "Tunay"

Technical

- Executive producer for Soupstar Entertainment: Chuck Isidro
- Executive producers for BMG Records Pilipinas: Rudy Y. Tee
- Album design and photography: Herbert Hernandez
- Recorded at Tracks Studios by Angee Rozul
- Album mix: Angee Rozul

== Accolades ==
Accolades for Permission to Shine
Year	Award-giving body	Category	Nominated work	Result
2005	Nu 107.5 2004 Year End Countdown	Top 20 OPM Songs on the 2004 NU107 Countdown	"Biglaan"	3rd
2005	Nu 107.5 2004 Year End Countdown	Top 20 OPM Songs on the 2004 NU107 Countdown	"Paba"	13th
2005	Nu 107.5 2004 Year End Countdown	Top 107 Songs for 2004 (ranked from #107 to #1)	"Biglaan"	4th
2005	Nu 107.5 2004 Year End Countdown	Top 107 Songs for 2004 (ranked from #107 to #1)	"Paba"	18th
2005	Nu 107.5 2004 Year End Countdown	Top 107 Songs for 2004 (ranked from #107 to #1)	"Sige"	49th
