= Migraine (song) =

2008 song by Moonstar88

Single by Moonstar88

from the album Todo Combo
- Language: Tagalog
- Released: February 19, 2008
- Genre: Pinoy rock; alternative rock; pop rock
- Length: 4:27
- Label: Musiko Records; Sony Music Philippines
- Songwriter: Herbert Hernandez

Moonstar88 singles chronology
"Di Kasi" (2007)	"Migraine" (2008)

Music video
- "Migraine" on YouTube

"Migraine" is a Tagalog-language song written by Herbert Hernandez for the Filipino rock band Moonstar88, with Maychelle Baay in the lead vocals. It was released on February 19, 2008 as the third single from their album Todo Combo (2007), after "Tadhana" and "Di Kasi". It was later included in the soundtrack of the 2009 film When I Met U, and was later covered by actress Yassi Pressman for the 2018 film Pambansang Third Wheel and by Sue Ramirez for the 2019 film Cuddle Weather. Alongside "Torete" and "Sulat", "Migraine" is generally considered as one of Moonstar88's most popular songs.

In December 2012, Moonstar88 released an acoustic version of "Migraine" on their album This Year.

== Music video ==
The music video was uploaded on Sony Philippines' YouTube channel on November 15, 2009.

== Legacy and other versions ==
Alongside "Torete" and "Sulat", "Migraine" is generally considered as one of Moonstar88's most popular songs. Billboard Philippines listed "Migraine" as one of "20 Of The Hottest Filipino Rock Songs Of The 2000s". According to Herbert Hernandez, who wrote the song, the simplicity of "Migraine" and that it was ahead of its time in tackling the gray areas of a relationship are what make it popular even until now.

"Migraine" has appeared on several soundtracks. It was included in the soundtrack of the 2009 film When I Met U. It was also covered by actress Yassi Pressman for the 2018 film Ang Pambansang Third Wheel and by Sue Ramirez for the 2019 film Cuddle Weather.

In December 2012, Moonstar88 released an acoustic version of "Migraine" on their album This Year. A Japanese cover of the song by the Japanese duo Ken and Miyuki went viral in the Philippines.
