= Panorama (6cyclemind album) =

Studio album by 6cyclemind
- Released: November 11, 2005
- Recorded: Tracks Studios
- Genre: Alternative rock
- Length: 61:22
- Label: Musiko Records & Sony BMG Music Entertainment (Philippines), Inc.

6cyclemind chronology
Permission to Shine (2003)	'''Panorama''' (2005)	Home (2007)

Singles from Panorama
- 1. "Sandalan" Released: June 2005; 2. "I" Released: August 2005; 3. "Umaasa" Released: October 2005; 4. "Trip" Released: December 2005/January 2006

Panorama, stylized as [panorama], is the second studio album of the Filipino band, 6cyclemind. It has 16 tracks and released under Musiko Records & Sony BMG Music Entertainment (Philippines), Inc.in 2005.

== Track listing and duration ==
Title	Composer	Length
"4 Years, 9Months"		0:37
"Sandalan" ("To Lean On")	J. D. Hernandez	3:56
"I"	J. D. Hernandez	3:58
"Clown"	J.D. Hernandez	4:49
"Collide	C. Isidro, Wency Cornejo	5:03
"Online"	R. Dimaculangan	3:05
"Di Tayo Titigil" ("We Won't Stop")	J.D. Hernandez	4:42
"Naghihintay" ("Waiting")	J.D. Hernandez	4:31
"Umaasa" ("Hoping")	J.D. Hernandez, R. Sarmiento, B. Cañamo, R. Dimaculangan, Rap Lyrics by: Francis Magalona	4:53
"Away"	R. Dimaculangan	3:49
"Bright Side"		1:10
"Touch"	J. D. Hernandez, K. Artajos	4:28
"Landas" ("Path")	R. Sarmiento, R. Dimaculangan, C. Isidro	3:37
"Kailanman" ("Whenever")	C. Isidro	4:30
"Trip"	J. D. Hernandez, W. Pineda, T. Marcelo	3:33
"Sige (Acoustic Version)"	J. D. Hernandez	4:41

== Notes ==
- The album reached Gold status in no time, spearheaded by the two early singles: "Sandalan" and "I"
- The most critically acclaimed album of the band

== Personnel ==
- Ney Dimaculangan - Lead Vocals
- Rye Sarmiento - Guitars
- Chuck Isidro - Lead Guitars
- Bob Cañamo - bass
- Wendell Garcia / Melvin Macalinao - drums & percussion

Additional Musician:

- Guest Vocals on "Di Tayo Titigil" by: Ebe Dancel of Sugarfree
- Guest Vocals on "Umaasa" by: Francis Magalona

== Album Credits ==
- Executive Producer for Soupstar Entertainment Inc. : Chuck Isidro and Buddy Zabala
- Executive Producer for Soupstar Entertainment Inc. : Chuck Isidro
- Executive Producers for BMG Records Pilipinas: Rudy Y. Tee
- A & R Direction: Vic Valenciano
- Album Design and Photography: John Ed De Vera and Wincy Aquino Ong
- Recorded At: TRACKS Studios by Angee Rozul
- Album Mix: Angee Rozul
