= Greetings From Callalily =

Studio album by Callalily
- Released: November 23, 2015
- Genre: OPM, alternative rock, pop rock
- Length: 44:32
- Label: Universal Records

Callalily chronology
Flower Power (2012)	Greetings From Callalily (2015)

Singles from Greetings From Callalily
- 1. "Now, I'm Dancing" Released: August 11, 2015; 2. "Bitter Song" Released: January 7, 2016; 3. "Is This Love" Released: April 13, 2016 (Music Video released on September 14, 2016); 4. "San Ako Magsisimula" Released: February 16, 2017

Greetings From Callalily is the fifth and recent album by the Filipino pop rock band Callalily. It was released on November 23, 2015 through Universal Records, and would serve as a tribute album for the 10th anniversary of the band since its debut in the Philippine rock scene in November 2005. It was also the last studio album to feature their band name Callalily as it is now being renamed to Lily following Cipriano's acrimonious departure from the band in 2022.

The album shows a new kind of music style employed by the band, as they wrote songs about love, promises and forevers in a metric style of lyrical writing. Though it was kind of experimental at first, but coupled with the familiar and well-known music and showmanship of the band, the current album is starting to get media hype and positive applause from certified OPM listeners. The band cited the album as the songwriting debut of the band's bassist Aaron Ricafrente.

Originally, the first single was "Now I'm Dancing", which was released before the album was launched, and is the only single not to have a music video, as the band deemed that their second single, entitled "Bitter Song" was more emotional in lyrics, with a huge hype surrounding the song, so the band decided to pursue it further until its release in early 2016 (they were targeting the younger generations in their second single, hence, it entailed more focus that the first single). The third song released from this album, "Is This Love", became an instant smash hit, eventually surpassing the short-lived hype of their second single, "Bitter Song", gaining several air plays across various music stations in the country. It is also the only song of the band, that was released not simultaneously with the music video, as the audio of the song was released in April 2016 and its music video, shot in an ancestral house in General Santos, was only released 5 months after in September 2016.

== Track listing ==
No.	Title	Writer(s)	Length
1.	"Beautiful"	Kean Cipriano	3:12
2.	"Bitter Song" (feat. Maysh Baay of Moonstar88)	Lem Belaro	4:16
3.	"Iintindihin Ko"	Cipriano	4:01
4.	"I'm Coming Home"	Tatsi Jamnague	3:56
5.	"Is This Love"	Jamnague	4:45
6.	"Nasaan Ka Na"	Cipriano, Aaron Ricafrente	4:35
7.	"Now I'm Dancing"	Jamnague	3:29
8.	"Raise This Cup"	Cipriano	3:15
9.	"SMB"	Cipriano, Ricafrente	4:25
10.	"Sa'n Ako Magsisimula" (also contains another version of "Bitter Song" as a hidden track)	Cipriano	8:38
