= Good by Sunday =

Good By Sunday

Studio album by 6cyclemind
- Released: June 9, 2012
- Genre: Alternative rock
- Length: 37:31
- Label: Universal Records

6cyclemind chronology
Project 6 Cyclemind (2009)	Good By Sunday (2012)

Singles from Good By Sunday
- 1. "Basta Ako" Released: June 8, 2012; 2. "Pangako" Released: April 17, 2013; 3. "Good By Sunday" Released: February 19, 2014

Good By Sunday is the sixth album by the Filipino Band, 6 Cyclemind, released under Universal Records and Soupstar Music on June 9, 2012. This is the first album that does not feature Ney Dimaculangan, who departed ways with the band after their previous album and went solo. The album also features new sessionists to replace the members who parted ways with the band.

The album contains 11 tracks. It has not been well-received by some of their avid listeners, due to sounding with a more different musical style than the other material that the audience used to listen under Ney's lead, and also Sony Music Philippines went on a hiatus that time.

== Track listing ==
No.	Title	Length
1.	"Basta Ako" (featuring Jamich and Jinri Park)	3:09
2.	"Bola"	2:43
3.	"Image Lang 'Yon"	3:01
4.	"Good By Sunday"	3:45
5.	"Kontrabida"	2:11
6.	"Lunod"	4:16
7.	"Pangako"	3:37
8.	"Sampayan At Plantsa"	4:04
9.	"Sumabay Ka Lang"	3:23
10.	"Wag Kang Maniniwala"	3:13
11.	"Huwag Na"	4:09

== Personnel ==
- Tutti Caringal - vocals
- Rye Sarmiento - rhythm guitar
- Bob Cañamo - bass guitar
- Herbert Hernandez - lead guitar
- Vic Aquino - drums

== Release history ==
Region	Date	Label
Philippines	June 8, 2012	Universal Records
