= Fiesta! Magsasaya ang Lahat =

Fiesta! Magsasaya Ang Lahat

Studio album by 6cyclemind
- Released: October 18, 2007
- Recorded: November 2006 – June 2007
- Genre: Alternative rock
- Length: 1:07:38
- Label: Musiko Records; Sony BMG Music Entertainment (Philippines), Inc.

6cyclemind chronology
Home (2007)	Fiesta! Magsasaya Ang Lahat (2007)	Project: 6 Cyclemind (2009)

Singles from Fiesta! Magsasaya Ang Lahat
- 1. "Magsasaya" Released: June 29, 2007; 2. "Aaminin" Released: September 14, 2007; 3. "Gusto Na Kita" Released: December 4, 2007; 4. "Saludo" Released: October 24, 2008

Fiesta! Magsasaya Ang Lahat is the fourth studio album of the Filipino band, 6cyclemind. Having 18 tracks, it was released by Musiko Records & Sony BMG Music Entertainment (Philippines), Inc. in October 18, 2007.

== Track listing ==
No.	Title	Length
1.	"Si Lola Ipay (Filler)"	0:30
2.	"Fiesta"	3:59
3.	"Magsasaya"	4:50
4.	"Mag Usap"	4:28
5.	"Hula ni Juan"	2:48
6.	"Aaminin"	4:20
7.	"Pwede"	3:47
8.	"Probinsya"	5:41
9.	"Etan, Jaco at Felicia (Filler)"	0:30
10.	"Gusto na Kita"	3:50
11.	"Mari Cruz at Fonzy (Filler)"	1:07
12.	"Sumabay"	4:05
13.	"Nasayang"	4:42
14.	"Kwentong Barbero"	4:01
15.	"Alagaan Mo Siya"	5:30
16.	"Buhay"	4:10
17.	"awawala"	3:48
18.	"Saludo"	5:33
