= Project 6 Cyclemind =

Project 6cyclemind

Studio album by 6cyclemind
- Released: July 22, 2009
- Recorded: December 2008 – May 2009
- Genre: Alternative rock
- Length: 50:21
- Label: Musiko Records; Sony Music Philippines

6cyclemind chronology
Fiesta! Magsasaya Ang Lahat (2007)	Project 6cyclemind (2009)	Good by Sunday (2012)

Singles from Project 6cyclemind
- 1. "Walang Iwanan" Released: June 11, 2009; 2. "Kasalanan" Released: October 27, 2009; 3. "Kung Wala Na Nga" Released: April 9, 2010

Project 6 Cyclemind is the fifth studio album by Filipino rock band, 6cyclemind. Having 12 tracks, it was released by Musiko Records and Sony Music Philippines in July 2009.

This marked the final album featuring Ney Dimaculangan as the band's vocalist prior to his departure to pursue a solo career.

== Track listing ==
All tracks are written by J.D Hernandez, except where noted.

No.	Title	Writer(s)	Length
1.	"Alapaap"	Ely Buendia	5:35
2.	"Noon at Ngayon"		3:57
3.	"Kasalanan (Featuring Gloc 9)"	Hernandez, Gloc 9	5:27
4.	"Pangarap"		4:28
5.	"If Only"	Hernandez, Dimaculangan, Rye Sarmiento	4:02
6.	"Mahiwagang Pag ibig"		3:23
7.	"Takipsilim"	Hernandez, Sarmiento	4:19
8.	"Sagot Kita"	Manuel Ferrer, Noime Cruz	5:25
9.	"Sa Langit"		4:21
10.	"Dream"	Hernandez, Kathy Artajos	4:21
11.	"Kung Wala na Nga"	Hernandez, Sarmiento	3:46
12.	"Walang Iwanan"		3:36

== Trivia ==
- The song "Alapaap," originally performed by the band Eraserheads, was featured on The Eraserheads tribute album, Ultraelectromagneticjam.
- Three of the band's original compositions, "Walang Iwanan," "Mahiwagang Pag-Ibig," and "Pangarap," have been recorded by other artists. The lead single, "Walang Iwanan," was covered by the band Pop Filter. "Mahiwagang Pag-Ibig" was performed by Pinoy Big Brother Teen Edition alumnus Aldred Gatchalian for the ABS-CBN afternoon series Love Spell, and "Pangarap" was interpreted by Karel Marquez and subsequently featured in a Koreanovela.
- The song "Sagot Kita" served as the theme for the ABS-CBN Foundation.
- The song "Noon at Ngayon?" was used as a jingle for Tanduay.
