= Home (6cyclemind album) =

Studio album by 6cyclemind
- Released: January 27, 2007
- Recorded: August–December 2006
- Genre: Pinoy rock, alternative rock, pop rock
- Label: Musiko Records & Sony BMG Music Entertainment (Philippines), Inc.
- Producer: Wendell Garcia

6cyclemind chronology
Panorama (2005)	Home (2007)	Fiesta! Magsasaya Ang Lahat (2007)

Professional ratings
Review scores
Source	Rating
Titik Pilipino	3/5 stars

Home is the third album of the Filipino band 6cyclemind, released by Musiko Records & Sony BMG Music Entertainment (Philippines), Inc. on January 27, 2007. Having all cover tracks, the album released 3 singles: "Prinsesa", "Upside Down" and "Dinamayan".

== Track listing ==
No.	Title	Writer(s)	Length
1.	"Across the Universe"	Lennon-McCartney
2.	"Circle"	Edie Brickell
3.	"Prinsesa"	Teeth	4:27
4.	"In Between Days"	The Cure
5.	"Be My Number Two"	Joe Jackson
6.	"Upside Down"	Two Minds Crack	5:23
7.	"Landslide"	Stephanie Nicks
8.	"Talkin' 'bout a Revolution"	Tracy Chapman
9.	"Dinamayan"	Rolly Maligad	4:14
10.	"Home"	Michael Bublé, Alan Chang, Amy Foster-Gillies
11.	"Come to My Window"	Melissa Etheridge

== Album credits ==
- Executive Producer: Rudy Y. Tee
- Executive A&R: Vic Valenciano
- All songs arranged by 6cyclemind & Wendell Garcia
- All songs performed by 6cyclemind
- Produced by Wendell Garcia
- Engineered by Angee Rozul & Mark Villena of Tracks Studios
- Strings by Bobby Velasco on \"In Between Days\"
- Violin by Maricor Reyes on \"Be My Number Two\"
- Piano by Isha Abubakar on \"Be My Number Two\"
- Album cover concept, design and photography by John Ed de Vera
