= Herbert Hernandez =

Filipino musician (born 1981)

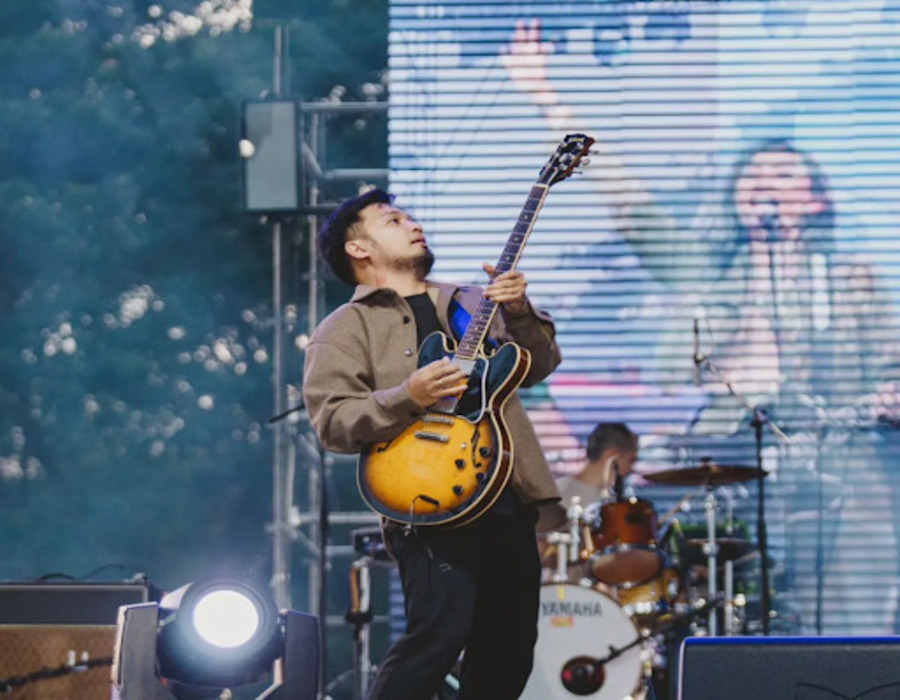

Background information
- Born: Herbert Hernandez; April 15, 1981 (age 45)
- Origin: Manila, Philippines
- Genres: Alternative rock; pop rock; OPM
- Occupations: Guitarist; songwriter; advertising executive
- Years active: 1999–present
- Member of: Moonstar88; 6cyclemind
- Website: herberthernandez.square.site

Herbert Hernandez is a Filipino guitarist and songwriter. He is best known as a founding member and lead guitarist of the rock band Moonstar88 and as the lead guitarist of 6cyclemind. He is also active in the Philippine advertising industry as a co-founder of the independent agency Gigil.

== Biography ==
=== Early life and education ===
Hernandez studied Fine Arts majoring in Advertising, at the University of Santo Tomas. He graduated magna cum laude in 2002. During his time in college, he became involved in music performance and songwriting, which later developed into his professional career.

=== Moonstar88 ===
Hernandez co-founded Moonstar88 in the late 1999 and served as the band's lead guitarist and songwriter. The band gained national attention in the early 2000s as part of the Philippine alternative pop movement. He contributed to several of the group's most well-known songs, including "Torete" (2000) and "Migraine" (2007).

"Torete" was added late during the recording of the band's debut album Popcorn (2000) and later became one of Moonstar88's signature songs. He also co-wrote "Migraine" which became one of the most-streamed Filipino songs of all time, surpassing 100 million plays across digital platforms.

=== 6cyclemind ===
Hernandez joined the Filipino alternative rock band 6cyclemind in 2010 as lead guitarist, several years after the group had established mainstream success in the Philippine music scene. Hernandez became part of the band's lineup alongside vocalist Tutti Caringal, guitarist Rye Sarmiento, bassist Bob Cañamo, and drummer Vic Aquino. During his time with the band, Hernandez appeared on the studio album Good by Sunday, which was released in 2012 under Universal Records and Soupstar Music.

By the mid-2020s, Hernandez continued to perform with 6cyclemind while remaining active with Moonstar88. Both bands later announced plans for a joint tour in the United States scheduled for June 2025.

== Personal life ==
Hernandez is married and has three children. He has spoken about balancing his work in music and advertising with family life.

In 2018, he founded The Indierectory, a platform that connects independent advertising professionals and freelancers with agencies. He also launched Lakihan mo Logo, a concert series featuring bands made up of advertising professionals, and organized Rockovery, a series of benefit concerts for members of the advertising community facing serious illness.

== Discography ==
=== With Moonstar88 ===
- Popcorn (2000)
- Pressed for Time (2002)
- Todo Combo (2006)
- Moonstar88 (2011)
- This Year (2012)
- Lourdes 2088 (2023)

=== With 6cyclemind ===
- Good by Sunday (2012)
