= Acel Bisa =

Philippine singer and songwriter

Acel Bisa van Ommen
- Born: Maria Cecilia Beronilla Bisa; August 28, 1976 (age 49)
- Occupation: Singer
- Instrument: Guitar
- Years active: 1998–present

Maria Cecilia Beronilla Bisa van Ommen, also known as Acel Bisa (her maiden name), is a Filipino singer and songwriter.

== Career ==
She is most known for performing the song "Torete" with her former band. But as a solo artist, she has also become famous for singing the English version of One Love, the theme song to the hit Korean television drama Spring Waltz.

In 2007, Acel released her first album as a solo artist entitled Silver Lining. A ten-track album featuring songs Laugh and Cry, Pakiusap, Sa Ngalan Ng Pag-Ibig, and Silver Lining among others.

Acel has also contributed her original compositions to soundtracks of Philippine prime-time television shows My Girl (for her song Gulo, Hilo, Lito) and Rounin (for her song Sa Ngalan Ng Pag-Ibig). She contributed the song "I Believe" to the album Captured of the singer Christian Bautista. She has also worked with the band Gish while in 2011, she co-wrote the song “Palawan” with Yeng Constantino. She collaborated with the group Sesa and the artist Emmanuelle Vera. Acel released the EP Hello to Heaven, which included the single "Liliwanag".

== Former bands ==
From 1999 to 2004, Acel was the front-woman for the popular band Moonstar88. During her five years with the band she released two studio albums (Popcorn in 2001 and Press to Play in 2002) producing highly acclaimed songs Torete, Sulat, Sa Langit, and Fall On Me. Before her departure from the band in 2004 Acel worked with Maychelle Baay for several weeks to transition her into replacing her for the spot of lead vocalist.

Before her time with Moonstar88, Acel was part of the band Orphan Lily Together with Terence Tevez, Jeff Lima, and Paolo Bernaldo, they released a self-titled album with their hit single No Reason and was awarded NU107's Best New Artist award at the 1998 NU107 Rock Awards.

== Discography ==
- 1998 - Orphan Lily (self-titled album of her former band Orphan Lily)
- 2001 - Popcorn by Moonstar88
- 2002 - Press to Play by Moonstar88
- 2007 - Rounin OST (with various artists including Bamboo and Kitchie Nadal)
- 2008 - Spring Waltz (for her song One Love - English version)
- 2008 - My Girl (for her song "Gulo, Hilo, Lito" with various artists including Sam Milby, Richard Poon and Yeng Constantino)
- 2008 - Silver Lining by Acel van Ommen (her debut album as a solo-artist)
- 2012 - "Hello To Heaven" 6 track original compositions light CD
- 2015 - "Who Would Have Thought? Finding Identity, Love, and Purpose in Unexpected Moments" (first published book of Acel with 8 original songs downloadable in the book)
- 2019 - Your Universe (theme from Between Maybes)
- 2021 - Bawat Paghinga (featuring Gil Andrie)
- 2021 - Nais Lumaya (featuring Carlisle Tabanera)
- 2022 - Buhangin

== Personal life ==
Acel was born on August 28, 1976, as Maria Cecilia B. Bisa to university professors Simplicio and Paulina Bisa.

In 2004 she married her friend Danny van Ommen. After four years of marriage, she gave birth to her son in July 2008.

On September 20, 2024, Acel announced that she will hold a farewell concert due to plans to move to the Netherlands with her family.

== Awards and nominations ==
Year	Award giving body	Category	Nominated work	Results
1998	"RX 93.1 Year-End Awards for OPM artists"	Best New Artist of the Year	"Orphan Lily"	Won
1998	"Nu Rock Awards"	Best New Artist	"Orphan Lily"	Won
