= Flower Power (Callalily album) =

Studio album by Callalily
- Released: October 12, 2012
- Genre: OPM, alternative rock, pop rock
- Length: 42:57
- Label: Universal Records

Callalily chronology
Callalily (2009)	Flower Power (2012)	Greetings From Callalily (2015)

Singles from Callalily
- 1. "Pasasalamat" Released: October 16, 2012; 2. "HKM (Hindi Kita Malilimutan)" Released: February 24, 2013; 3. "Pansamantala" Released: September 4, 2013

Flower Power is the fourth album by Filipino band, Callalily. It was launched on October 12, 2012. It is their first released under Universal Records. This is also the band's first album as a four-piece band.

== Track listing ==
No.	Title	Length
1.	"Pasasalamat"	4:15
2.	"Sabik Na Sabik"	3:52
3.	"HKM (Hindi Kita Malilimutan)"	4:05
4.	"Lapit"	4:53
5.	"Buhay"	4:21
6.	"Pansamantala"	4:38
7.	"You & I"	4:41
8.	"Buhos ng Ulan"	3:22
9.	"Walang Sumipot"	4:37
10.	"Para Sa'yo"	4:13
