= Fisheye (album) =

Studio album by Callalily
- Released: March 7, 2008
- Genres: OPM, alternative rock, pop rock, emo
- Length: 1:02:20
- Labels: Musiko Records & Sony BMG Music Entertainment (Philippines), Inc.

Callalily chronology
Destination XYZ (2006)	Fisheye (2008)	Callalily (2009)

Singles from Fisheye
- 1. "Susundan" Released: April 2008; 2. "Ako'y Babalik" Released: August 2008; 3. "Trapped Inside The Moment (Limited Radio and Internet Play Only)" Released: December 4, 2008; 4. "Hintay" Released: February 2009

Fisheye is Callalily's second album released on March 7, 2008, by Sony Music. It contains singles "Susundan", "Ako'y Babalik" and "Hintay".

Through this second album, it showed that the band has truly matured with their music, illustrating a louder and more powerful "emotional" display of Callalily's sound, musicianship and showmanship.

== Track listing ==
1. Good Morning – 0:52
2. Ako'y Babalik – 4:48
3. Luha – 4:03
4. Jewelry Box – 2:26
5. Fake Lullabies – 3:37
6. Trapped Inside The Moment – 3:48
7. Tunay Na Ligaya – 4:46
8. Isabel – 5:22
9. Inside My Heart – 3:28
10. A Starry Night – 4:10
11. Shine – 3:26
12. Susundan – 3:39
13. Dito Ka Lang – 4:15
14. Lumbay – 4:00
15. Hintay – 5:16
16. Song For The Youth – 4:24
