= Callalily (album) =

Studio album by Callalily
- Released: October 12, 2009
- Genres: OPM, alternative rock, pop rock
- Length: 48:18
- Labels: Musiko Records & Sony Music Philippines

Callalily chronology
Fisheye (2008)	Callalily (2009)	Flower Power (2012)

Singles from Callalily
- 1. "Nananaginip" Released: September 14, 2009; 2. "Gabay" Released: September 9, 2010; 3. "Liwanag" Released: June 25, 2011; 4. "Right (Limited Radio and Internet Release Only)" Released: December 4, 2011

Callalily is the third album of Filipino rock band Callalily released on October 12, 2009, by Musiko Records & Sony Music Philippines. The album's singles include "Nananaginip", "Gabay", "Liwanag" and the limited radio and internet single, "Right".

The band notes that this album is more organic and is a return to the musical style of their debut album.

== Track listing ==
1. Langit – 3:59
2. Liwanag – 3:48
3. Nananaginip – 4:20
4. Gabay – 4:17
5. Dance All Night – 3:31
6. Dahilan – 4:21
7. Someday Oneday – 4:03
8. Right – 3:09
9. Nagagalit – 3:28
10. Eyes On Me (Ooo-Lala) – 3:41
11. L.O.V.E. – 3:31
12. Goodnight – 6:10
