= Destination XYZ =

Studio album by Callalily
- Released: July 17, 2006
- Genre: OPM, alternative rock, pop rock
- Length: 54:01
- Label: Musiko Records & Sony BMG Music Entertainment (Philippines), Inc.

Callalily chronology
Destination XYZ (2006)	Fisheye (2008)

Singles from Destination XYZ
- 1. "Stars" Released: July 21, 2006; 2. "Take My Hand" Released: January 2007; 3. "Magbalik" Released: February 12, 2007; 4. "Pasan" Released: May 5, 2007; 5. "Sanctuary" Released: August 2007; 6. "Dream (Radio Single Only)" Released: December 4, 2007

Professional ratings
Review scores
Source	Rating
titikpilipino.com	3/5 stars

Destination XYZ is the debut studio album released on July 17, 2006 by Callalily (now named Lily) through Musiko Records & Sony BMG Music Entertainment (Philippines), Inc.. It contains the singles "Stars", "Take My Hand", the breakthrough single "Magbalik", "Pasan","Sanctuary" and the radio single "Dream".

The album officially marked their success as OPM artists and gained applause in the Philippine music industry, forming a huge fanbase called 'Callalistas'. The album itself contains 12 tracks, and the singles off of the album proved a success.

"Magbalik" is considered the most popular song by Callalily. Its enduring popularity can be attributed to its iconic guitar intro. The monumental guitar riff has also become a fundamental guitar exercise in the key of E major across music instructional schools in the country.

== Track listing ==
Destination XYZ
No.	Title	Writer(s)	Producer(s)	Length
1.	"Stars"	L. Belaro	Ryan C. Sarmiento	3:53
2.	"Pasan"	L. Belaro	Rudy Tee	3:43
3.	"Take My Hand"	K. Cipriano		3:39
4.	"Magbalik"	L. Belaro	Ryan C. Sarmiento	5:27
5.	"Yakap"	K. Cipriano	Ryan C. Sarmiento	5:00
6.	"Kung Kaya Ko Lang"		Ryan C. Sarmiento	4:00
7.	"Takipsilim"	J. D. Hernandez, R. C. Sarmiento		5:07
8.	"Sanctuary"	K. Cipriano	Ryan C. Sarmiento	5:21
9.	"Muli"	K. Cipriano	Ryan C. Sarmiento	3:31
10.	"Dream"	J. D. Hernandez	Ryan C. Sarmiento	4:06
11.	"Insane"	A. C. Acosta	Ryan C. Sarmiento	4:22
12.	"The Final Song"	A. C. Acosta	Ryan C. Sarmiento	5:52
Total length:				54:01
