= Lily (band) =

Pop rock band from the Philippines

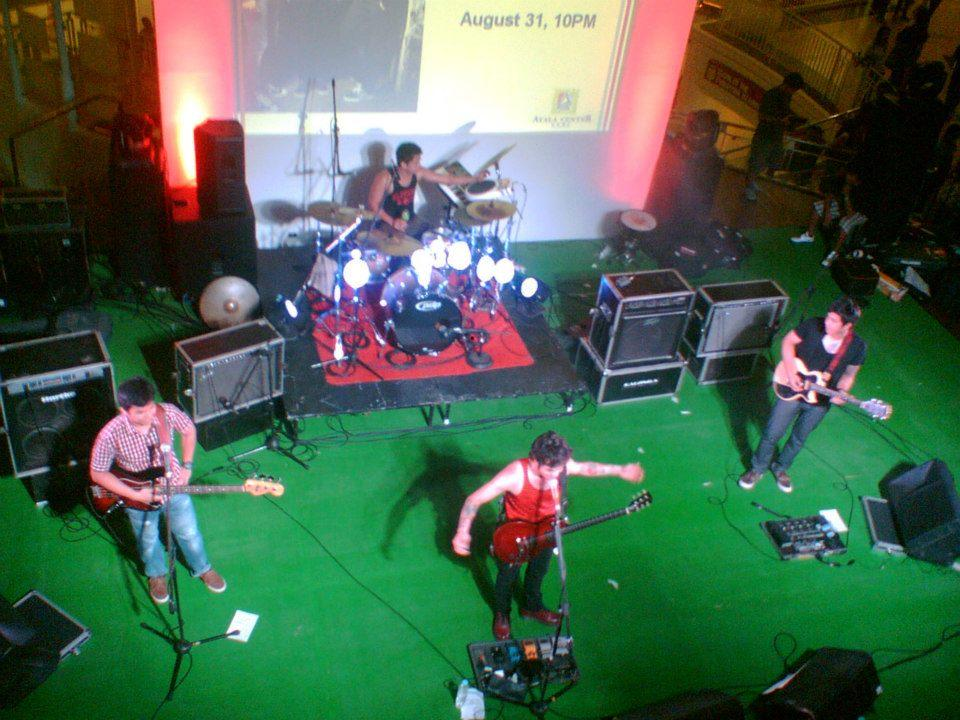
- Lily performing live in 2012

Background information
- Also known as: Callalily (2005–2022)
- Origin: Manila, Philippines
- Genres: Pinoy rock; alternative rock; pop rock
- Years active: 2005–present
- Labels: Sony Music Philippines (2006–2011); Universal Records (2012–2017); Soupstar Entertainment (2006–2017); Sindikato Productions/Callalily Entertainment/O/C Records (2017–2021); LX2 Entertainment (2022–present)
- Members: Aaron Ricafrente; Nathan Reyes; Alden Acosta; Joshua Bulot; Ezra Bañez
- Past members: Kean Cipriano; Tatsi Jamnague; Ken Tiongson; Brylle Balbuena; Lem Belaro

Lily, formerly Callalily, is a Filipino pop rock band formed in 2005. The band is currently composed of Aaron Ricafrente, Nathan Reyes, Joshua Bulot, Ezra Bañez, and Alden Acosta, the band's original lead guitarist who reunited with the band in 2022, twelve years after he left in 2010.

Notable former members include Kean Cipriano, the band's frontman for 17 years since the band's inception, who later embarked on a solo career and opened his own record label, and Tatsi Jamnague who later joined the band Gracenote. Following Cipriano's departure, drummer and chief songwriter Lem Belaro announced that they are changing the band's name to Lily and after a series of nationwide auditions, the band hired Joshua Bulot as Cipriano's replacement.

== Background ==
The band entered the Philippine music scene with their songs "Stars", "Take My Hand", their breakthrough single "Magbalik", "Pasan" (which was also included in the soundtrack of Lineage II), and "Sanctuary", all from their debut album Destination XYZ. Their second album, Fisheye followed not long after, which scored its first single "Susundan", dedicated to the death of their friend Jan Kevin Santos (sound manipulator & unclean vocals of Chicosci). A commercial jingle "Eto na ang Summer" that was specially composed for Sony Ericsson, also received airplay.

Callalily vocalist Kean Cipriano collaborated with Paraluman vocalist Madeline Ramboyong with their hit single "Tabi", from Paraluman's debut album In Lab!, launched in 2008.

Cipriano has also taken a new responsibility in acting on the top rated hit Sunday noontime teen television series BFGF with leading lady TV host and actress Alex Gonzaga on TV5. Half of the band's songs and new ones are used on that TV series with "Yakap" as its theme song and "Magbalik" as a background track. Cipriano is also a co-host of Sunday musical variety show, P.O.5. He is also formerly part of the sitcom Hapi Together and the magical comedy reality show, Magic Gimik. He was also formerly seen on Magic Bagsik and on the sitcom, Sugod Mga Kapatid, both aired on TV5. Callalily also appeared in the movie Praybeyt Benjamin and Of all the Things movie of Aga Muhlach and Regine Velasquez.

Cipriano has also worked with 6cyclemind in their redux of "Kung Wala Na Nga" with fellow members of the music industry, Yeng Constantino and Tutti. In June 2010, they released the music video on Music Uplate Live on ABS CBN.

In 2010, guitarist Alden Acosta parted ways with Callalily and moved to the US.

In 2011, Callalily became part of the debut project of the Big Band Syndicate (BBS) composed of Darwin Hernandez of Soupstar Entertainment and Rye Sarmiento of 6cyclemind. The project, which was entitled BBS featuring Kean Cipriano of Callalily, released Ctrl + Alt + Del - Restart, which included the song "Wala na Tayo".

In 2012, Callalily covered the Eraserheads classic "Minsan" from the various artists album, The Reunion. The band released their fourth studio album Flower Power in October 2012 with their 1st single, "Pasasalamat". This was also the first Callalily album since former band guitarist Alden Acosta left the band for Happy Days Ahead. Their second single from the album was "HKM (Hindi Kita Malilimutan)". Flower Power album reached Gold Record Award last March. They received the award from the Sunday Variety Program ASAP. The same month, they also won Best Group for the song "Pasasalamat" at MYX Music Awards 2013 held at Music Museum. Last June 7, they staged their first major concert back to back with fellow Soupstar artist 6cyclemind at Music Museum.

In 2013, the band was launched as one of the ambassadors of Hero Foundation from Ayala Group of Companies.

In May 2014, the band won as Most Popular Recording/ Performing Group at the 45th Guillermo Mendoza Box Office Entertainment Awards 2014.

At the end of 2015, the band released their fifth album, Greetings From Callalily, which spawned the singles "Bitter Song", "Now I'm Dancing", "Is This Love", and "Sa'n Ako Magsisimula".

In 2017, with production group Sindikato and Warner Music Philippines, the band released "Miles Away" online, their new song about a 'runaway bride'. The official music video was launched at YouTube on June 6, 2017.

In 2018, vocalist Kean Cipriano teased the fans to watch out for their 2 new songs, "Ex" and "Litrato". The music video for "Ex" was released in 2019, featuring the collaboration with Yeng Constantino.

In June 2022, Kean Cipriano reportedly left the band due to alleged infighting with the rest of the band members. However, Cipriano clarified that he did not leave the band, but rather disengaged from the rest of the members. Cipriano also claimed that the name Callalily is allegedly under his intellectual property prompting the remaining members to change their name to Lily. The remaining members have since released a statement regarding this and refuted Cipriano's earlier statements. After a series of nationwide auditions, Joshua Bulot of singing trio JBK who were contestants of The X Factor UK in 2017, was announced as the winner and became the new frontman/vocalist of the band in September 2022.

== Band members ==
Current members

- Aaron Paul Ricafrente – bass guitar (2005–present)
- Nathan Reyes – rhythm guitar (2017–2019, 2022–present); lead guitar (2019–present); keyboards, backing vocals (2017–present)
- Alden Acosta – lead guitar, backing vocals (2005–2010, 2022–present; touring/session 2017)
- Joshua Bulot – lead vocals (2022–present)
- Ezra Bañez – keyboards, keytar (2023–2025); drums (2025-Present)

Early members

- Kean Cipriano – lead vocals (2005–2022); rhythm guitar (2010–2022)
- Lemuel "Lem" Belaro – drums, percussion, synth, backing vocals, chief songwriter (2005–2025)
- Andrew John "Tatsi" Jamnague – rhythm guitar (2005–2010); lead guitar (2010–2017); backing vocals (2005–2017)
- Ken Tiongson – lead guitar, backing vocals (2017–2019)
- Brylle Balbuena – rhythm guitar (2019–2022)

== Discography ==
- 2006: Destination XYZ
- 2008: Fisheye
- 2009: Callalily
- 2012: Flower Power
- 2015: Greetings From Callalily

For the full discography, see: Callalily discography

== Awards and nominations ==
Year	Award giving body	Category	Nominated work	Results
2006	NU Rock Awards	Best New Artist	—N/a	Nominated
2006	SOP Pasiklaband	Favorite Breakthrough Artist	—N/a	Won
2007	GMMSF Box-Office Entertainment Awards	Most Promising Recording Group	—N/a	Won
2007	ASAP Pop Viewers Choice Awards	Best Pop Band	—N/a	Nominated
2007	ASAP Pop Viewers Choice Awards	Best Pop Music	"Magbalik"	Nominated
2007	MYX Music Awards	Favorite Song	"Stars"	Nominated
2007	MYX Music Awards	Favorite New Artist	—N/a	Nominated
2007	OPM Songhits Music Awards	Best Band of the Year	—N/a	Won
2007	OPM Songhits Music Awards	Song of The Year	"Magbalik"	Won
2007	OPM Songhits Music Awards	Favorite Male Vocalist	(for Kean Cipriano)	Nominated
2007	OPM Songhits Music Awards	Best Performance by a New Recording Artist	—N/a	Nominated
2008	ASAP Pop Viewers Choice Awards	Certified Platinum	"Destination XYZ"	Won
2008	GMMSF Box-Office Entertainment Awards	Most Promising Recording Group	—N/a	Won
2008	MYX Music Awards	Favorite Music Video	"Magbalik"	Nominated
2008	MYX Music Awards	Favorite Artist	—N/a	Nominated
2008	MYX Music Awards	Favorite Group	—N/a	Nominated
2008	SOP Pasiklaband	Song of the Year	"Susundan"	Won
2008	SOP Pasiklaband	Best Vocalist of the Year	(for Kean Cipriano)	Won
2009	MYX Music Awards	Favorite Artist	—N/a	Nominated
2009	MYX Music Awards	Favorite Group	—N/a	Nominated
2013	MYX Music Awards	Favorite Group	—N/a	Won
2013	MYX Music Awards	Favorite Artist	—N/a	Nominated
2013	MYX Music Awards	Favorite Remake	"Minsan"	Nominated
2013	MYX Music Awards	Favorite Media Soundtrack	"Minsan"	Nominated
2014	GMMSF Box-Office Entertainment Awards	Most Popular Recording/Performing Group	—N/a	Won
2015	GMMSF Box-Office Entertainment Awards	Most Popular Recording/Performing Group	—N/a	Won
