= 6cyclemind =

Filipino alternative and pop band

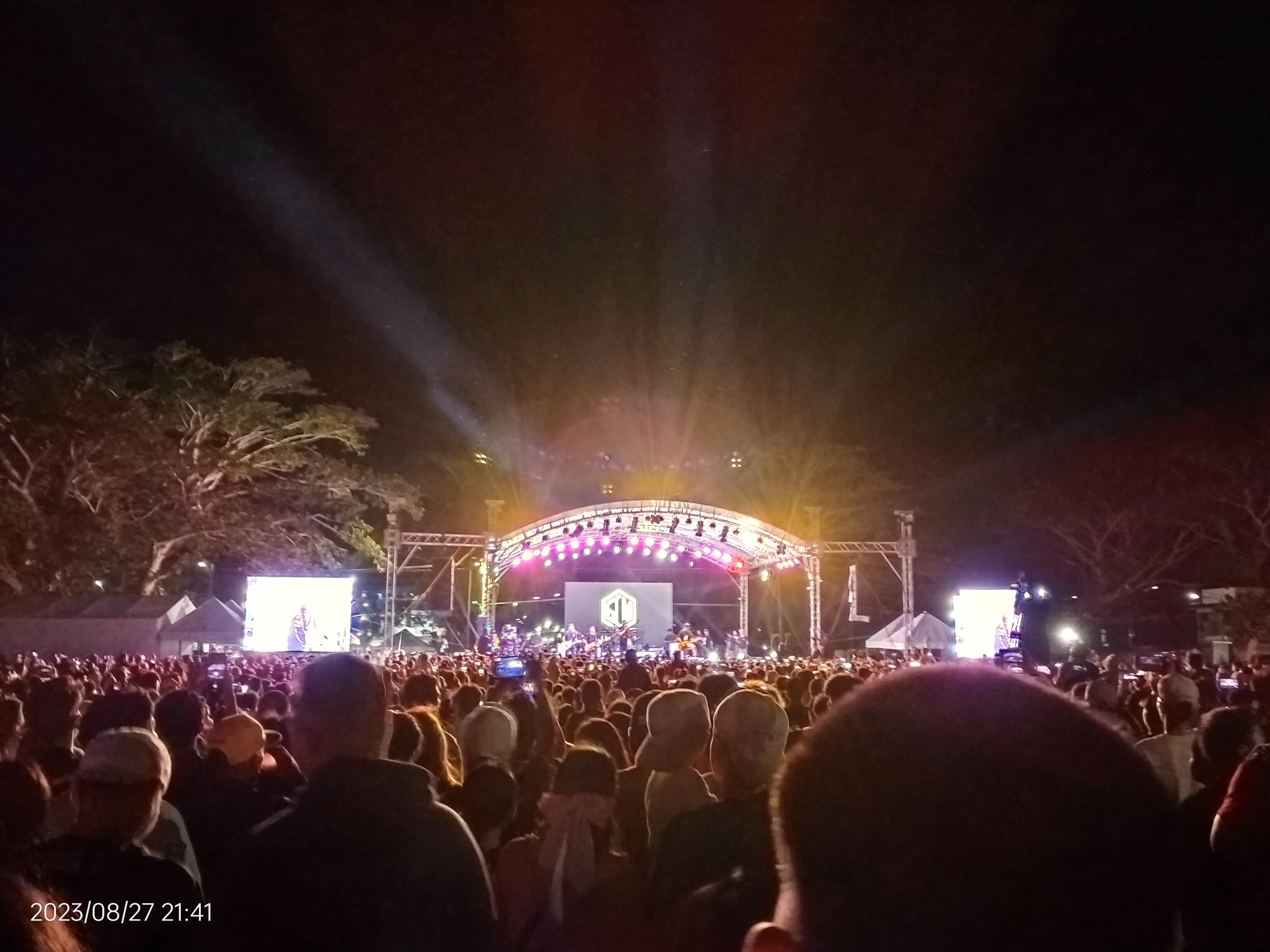

Background information
- Origin: Metro Manila, Philippines
- Genres: Pinoy rock; alternative rock; pop rock
- Years active: 2001–present
- Labels: Sony Music Philippines; Soupstar/Universal
- Members: Tutti Caringal; Rye Sarmiento; Bob Cañamo; Herbert Hernandez; Vic Aquino
- Past members: Gilbert Magat; Chuck Isidro; Ney Dimaculangan

6cyclemind is a Filipino rock band composed of Tito Fortunato "Tutti" Caringal II on vocals, Ryan "Rye" Sarmiento on rhythm and lead guitars and backing vocals, Roberto "Bob" Cañamo on bass guitar and backing vocals, Herbert Hernandez on lead guitars, Vic Aquino on drums and behind-the-scene 6th member/chief songwriter/manager, Darwin Hernandez.

The band's music is a fusion of alternative and pop music. The band gained a mainstream exposure in the early 2000s and was a prominent fixture of the "Tunog Kalye" era.

== History ==
The group has released five studio albums under Sony Music Philippines: Permission to Shine (2003), Panorama (2005), Home (2007), Fiesta! Magsasaya Ang Lahat (2007), and Project: 6cyclemind (2009).

They previously performed for the Tanduay's "First Five", along with Rico Blanco (2009), Kamikazee, Chicosci, Sandwich and Bamboo (2010).

The band was the endorser of Suzuki for two consecutive years after 2010. Through the Suzuki Invasion tour, they performed their hits in different parts of the country in those years.

In 2011, lead vocalist Ney Dimaculangan went on hiatus to pursue other musical endeavors but eventually pursued a solo career and later fronted his namesake band citing "burnout" as the primary reason. Drummer Tutti Caringal replaced him as the lead vocalist.

In 2015, lead vocalist Tutti Caringal, who won as councilor in the 2013 elections in Cabuyao, Laguna, temporarily went on hiatus due to his candidacy as a candidate for the 2016 elections. He won the said elections and won again in the 2019 elections. He remains active in both his political and band duties. Caringal came from a military family.

Lead guitarist Herbert Hernandez went on to become an award-winning Advertising Executive and Creative Director. He co-founded the agency GIGIL.

=== Name origin ===
The name "6cyclemind" comes from the five members plus their manager, Darwin Hernandez of Soupstar Entertainment. Collectively, they all contribute to composing, arranging, and brainstorming, which is a continuous cycle in their creation of music, hence 6cyclemind.

Carlos "Chuck" Isidro was the former lead guitarist for Afterimage. When Afterimage disbanded, Isidro worked in the recording company. During his stay, he signed up a group managed by Darwin Hernandez where he met Ryan "Rye" Sarmiento, Roberto "Bob" Cañamo, Gilbert “Gibbz” Magat (former drummer for Soft Pillow Kisses) and Rhoneil "Ney" Dimaculangan. Isidro and Hernandez agreed to form a band with them, which became 6cyclemind. In 2005, Gilbert Magat was replaced by Tutti Caringal of the band Protein Shake.

== Band members ==
=== Current members ===
- Tutti Caringal – lead vocals (2011–present); formerly drums and backing vocals (2005–2011)
- Rye Sarmiento – rhythm and lead guitar, backing vocals (2001–present)
- Bob Cañamo – bass guitar (2001–present); backing vocals (2011–present)
- Herbert Hernandez – lead guitar (2010–present)
- Vic Aquino – drums (2011–present)

=== Regular touring members ===
- John Paul Bongat - keyboards, piano, backing vocals (2019–present)

=== Touring substitutes ===
- Berns Cuevas – rhythm and lead guitar, bass guitar, backing vocals
- Raffy Bonifacio – drums

=== Early members ===
- Gilbert Magat – drums & percussions (2001–2005
- Chuck Isidro – lead guitar (2001–2010)
- Ney Dimaculangan – lead vocals (2001–2011;

== Discography ==
=== Studio albums ===
Album	Singles	Year	Label
Permission to Shine	"Biglaan", "Paba", "Sige", "Nalilito", "Wait or Go"	2003	Sony Music Philippines
Panorama	"Sandalan", "I", "Trip", "Umaasa"	2005	Sony Music Philippines
Home	"Prinsesa", "Upside Down", "Dinamayan"	2007	Sony Music Philippines
Fiesta: Magsasaya Ang Lahat	"Magsasaya", "Aaminin", "Gusto Na Kita", "Saludo"	2007	Sony Music Philippines
Project: 6cyclemind	"Walang Iwanan, "Kasalanan" (feat. Gloc 9 and Wendell Garcia of Pupil), "Kung Wala Na Nga" (feat. Yeng Constantino and Kean Cipriano of Callalily)	2009	Sony Music Philippines
Good by Sunday	"Basta Ako", "Pangako", "Good by Sunday"	2012	Soupstar Music / Universal Records

=== Compilation albums ===
- Ultraelectromagneticjam!: The Music Of The Eraserheads (Sony Music, 2005)
- The Best Of Manila Sound: Hopia Mani Popcorn (Viva Records, 2006)
- Gusto Ko Ng Rock (Sony Music, 2009)
- Tambayan 101.9 (Star Music, 2009)
- Sakto Sa Pasko (Soupstar Music, 2009)
- The Reunion Soundtrack (Star Music, 2012)
- Araw, Buwan, Taon, Dekada (Sony Music, 2022)

=== Singles ===
- Di Na Atin feat. Karla Estrada (Star Music, 2017)
- No Rewind, No Replay (Star Music, 2018)
- Kinsentenyal (Sony Music, 2021)
- Langit (Sony Music, 2021)

=== Soundtracks ===
- When I Met U: Original Motion Picture Soundtrack (Sony Music, 2009)
- BFGF: Music From Original TV Soundtrack (Sony Music, 2010)
- Smart (Saludo, 2010)

== Awards and nominations ==
Year	Award giving body	Category	Nominated work	Results
2004	Awit Awards	Best Rock Recording	"Pa Ba"	Nominated
2004	Awit Awards	Best Performance by a New Group Recording Artists	"Biglaan"	Nominated
2006	NU Rock Awards	Best Album Packaging	John Ed de Vera for "Panorama"	Nominated
2006	Awit Awards	Best Rock Recording	" Sandalan"	Nominated
2007	MYX Music Awards	Favorite Group	—N/a	Nominated
2007	MYX Music Awards	Favorite Collaboration	"Umaasa"	Nominated
2008	MYX Music Awards	Favorite Song	"Magsasaya"	Nominated
2008	MYX Music Awards	Favorite Artist	—N/a	Nominated
2008	MYX Music Awards	Favorite Group	—N/a	Nominated
2008	SOP PasiklaBAND	Band of The Year	—N/a	Won
2009	ASAP Pop Viewers' Choice Awards	Pop Band	—N/a	Won
2010	MYX Music Awards	Favorite Music Video	"Kasalanan"	Won
2010	ASAP Pop Viewers' Choice Awards	Pop Band	—N/a	Won
2011	MYX Music Awards	Favorite Collaboration	"Kung Wala Na Nga"	Won
2023	Awit Awards	Best Instrumental Recording	"Sandalan"	Won
