= Moonstar88 =

Filipino rock band

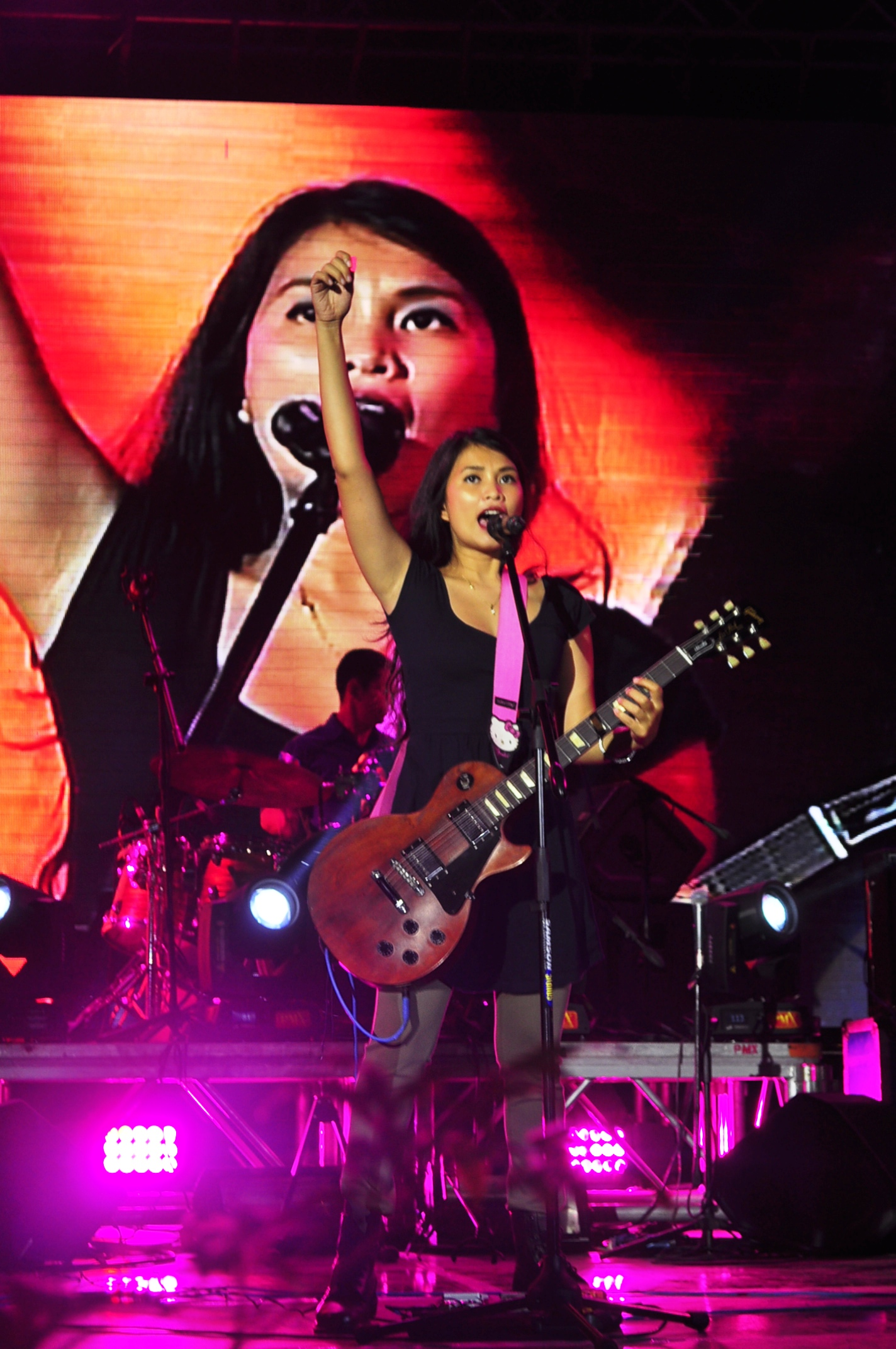
- Maysh Baay and Moonstar88 performing at Earth Day Jam 2013.

Background information
- Origin: Manila, Philippines
- Genres: Alternative rock; Pop rock
- Years active: 1999–present
- Labels: Alpha Music (2000–2007); Sony BMG (2006–2012); Ivory Music (2012–2016); Soupstar Entertainment/Warner Music Philippines (2016–present)
- Members: Maysh Baay; Bon Sundiang; Herbert Hernandez
- Past members: Paolo Bernaldo; Acel Bisa; William Pineda; Teng Marcelo; Buddy Zabala
- Website: soupstar.ph

Moonstar88 is a Filipino rock band formed in Manila, Philippines in 1999.

== History ==
Moonstar88 was formed in February 1999. They were signed to Sony BMG by 2006, and later to Ivory Records in 2012. Previously under Backbeat Management, they are now with Soupstar Management under Darwin Hernandez which also handles other bands including Sandwich, 6cyclemind, Imago, Gracenote, Banda ni Kleggy and more.

As of April 2008, they had released four albums, Popcorn, Press to Play and Todo Combo. Later, “This Year” and a collaboration on "Pag-Ibig Ko Sa Iyo", found on RoK On! Music inspired by Ragnarok Online were released in 2012 and 2009 respectively. They performed a rendition of the APO song "Panalangin." It was later added to the tribute album for the band Apo Hiking Society on the album, Kami nAPO Muna. The band has also recorded a cover of Yano's famous song, "Senti".

They released the album This Year under Ivory music. It contained eight songs, including a track featuring Parokya Ni Edgar's Chito Miranda and an acoustic version of "Migraine”.

This Year won the Best Design Packaging Category at the ADOBO Design Awards 2013 held on April 26 at the Ayala Museum, Makati.

=== 2015–present ===
In early 2015, Bernaldo started playing for Parokya ni Edgar when their bassist Buwi Meneses announced a hiatus from the band due to relocating with his family in USA. Bernaldo was asked to leave from the group without a formal announcement from any member of the band that he was already dismissed. Buddy Zabala of Eraserheads took his place and is currently playing and recording for the band recently. Although it is still unclear, no formal announcement was made.

== Band members ==
Current members

- Maysh Baay - vocals/guitar (2004–present)
- Bon Sundiang - drums/vocals (2005–present)
- Herbert Hernandez - lead guitar (1999–present)

Touring members

- James Roy Linao - guitars
- Jazz Jorge - bass
- Berns Cuevas - bass, lead guitar
- Vic Aquino - drums
- Karmi Santiago - drums

Past members

- Buddy Zabala - bass (2016–2024)
- Paolo Bernaldo - bass (1999–2015) (currently touring for Parokya ni Edgar since 2015)
- Acel Bisa - vocals, guitar (1999–2004)
- William Pineda - drums, percussion (1999–2004)
- Teng Marcelo - guitars, vocals (1999–2001)

== Discography ==
=== Studio albums ===
Album	Tracks	Year	Records
Popcorn	"Hilaw pa ang Sinaing" "Bata" "I'm Sorry" "Torete" "Again" "Fall on Me" "Untamed" "Doors" "Sa Langit" "Hear Me" "Fear" "Panaginip" "Thanks" "I'm Sorry" (Acoustic Version)	2000	Alpha Music
Press to Play	"Sabi Mo" "Sayang" "Luto Na ang Sinaing" "Timeless Peace" "Sulat" "Lonely Tree" "Take Away" "Pasensiya Na" "More Than That" "Sana" "Tongue-tied" "Ang Pag-ibig Kong Ito" "Huwag Na Muna"	July 26, 2002	Alpha Music
Todo Combo	"Todo Combo" "Tadhana" "Migraine" "Can't Stop" "Senti" (originally by Yano) "Panalangin" (originally by APO) "F.V.O." "Late Ka Na Naman" "Dot Song" "Bintana" "T.Y.P." "Lumiliwanag" "Friendster" "M.V.O." "Di Kasi" "Di Kita" "Girlfriend" "Damang-dama"	June 1, 2007	Musiko Records & Sony BMG Music Entertainment (Philippines), Inc.
Moonstar 88	"Again" "Huwag Na Muna" "Sa Langit" "Tongue-Tied" "Sana" "I'm Sorry" "Fall on Me" "Torete" "Ang Pag-Ibig Kong Ito" "Hear Me" "Lonely Tree" "Sayang" "Doors" "Fear" "Untamed" "Sulat" "Sabi Mo" "Bata"	2011	Alpha Music
This Year	"Gilid" "Ligaw" "Bastusan" "Boom Ka" "Erase My Heart" "Taxi" "Ligaw" feat. Chito Miranda "Migraine" (acoustic)	2012	Ivory Music and Video
Lourdes 2088	"Nangawit" "Walang Katapusang Luha" "Next Week" "Feels So Right" "Parola" "Hangga’t" "Akong Bahala" "Forever With You" "Simple" "Sumaya Ka Ba Sa Akin"	2023	Soupstar Music

=== EPs ===
EP	Tracks	Year	Records
Strings Attached	"Sa Langit" "Sulat" "Torete" "Huwag na Lang"	2018	Alpha Music

=== Singles ===
Singles	Tracks	Year	Records
Sana Mali	"Sana Mali"	2016	Warner Music
Itulog Mo Na Yan	"Itulog Mo Na Yan"	2017	Warner Music
Sorry	"Sorry"	2018	Warner Music

=== Awards and nominations ===
Year	Award giving body	Category	Nominated work	Results
2001	NU Rock Awards	Best New Artist	—N/a	Nominated
2001	NU Rock Awards	Best Music Video	"Torete"	Nominated
2001	RX 93.1	OPM Artist of the Year	"OPM Band of the Year"	Won
2001	RX 93.1	OPM Song of the Year	"Sa Langit"	Won
2007	MYX Music Awards	Favorite Remake	"Panalangin"	Nominated
2013	Adobo Design Awards	Best Design Packaging	"This Year"	Nominated
2017	ALTA Media Icon Awards	Band of The Year	—N/a	Won
2019	Wish 107.5 Music Awards	Bronze Wishclusive Elite Circle Award	"Migraine"	Won
2023	Awit Awards	Best Cover Art	Nelz Yumul for "Next Week"	Nominated
2024	Wish 107.5 Music Awards	Rock/Alternative Song of the Year	"Parola"	Won
