= List of Lani Misalucha live performances =

Filipino artist live performances

Filipino singer Lani Misalucha has headlined numerous concerts in the Philippines and abroad. She is regarded as one of the most successful Filipino artist in live entertainment. She came to prominence in 1996 following the release of her first single "More Than I Should" and competed at the Metropop Song Festival twice (1996 & 1999), winning the latter. She represented the Philippines at the 3rd Asia Song Festival in 1998 and took home the "Best Interpreter" award for her performance. Less than five years since she pursued a singing career in the industry, she staged her first major solo concert Lani Misalucha: The Crossover Live Tour (2001) at the Araneta Coliseum. It received praises from critics and audiences and became the twelfth recipient of the coveted "Entertainer of the Year" at the Aliw Awards.

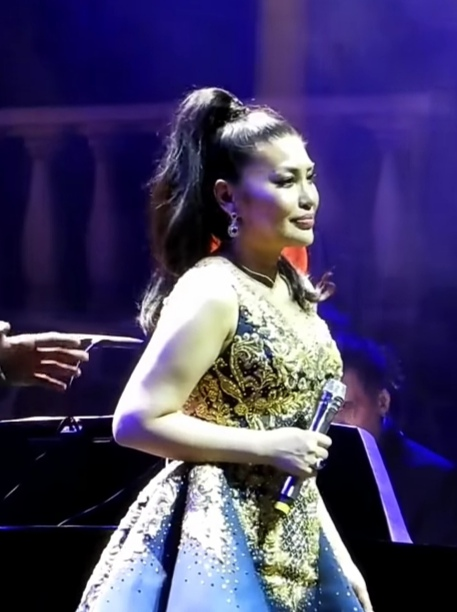
Misalucha performing at the Araneta Coliseum (2019)

As an acclaimed entertainer, Misalucha has embarked on a great number of concerts in America, Middle East, Asia and Oceania. She has performed alongside musical artists such as Brian McKnight, Kenny Loggins, Sergio Mendes, Jim Brickman and Stephen Bishop. In 2003, Misalucha was handpicked by Whitney Houston to join her in Japan for her first concert in Asia but had to withdraw due to her pregnancy. She received further recognition as a performer in 2004 after headlining a string of concert series in Las Vegas and became the first Asian artist to headline in a main showroom in Vegas, as well as the first Filipino musical artist to headline a six-month stint in Vegas. In 2007, she was handpicked by Josh Groban to perform at his concert in Manila, as part of the Awake Tour. In November 2009, Dionne Warwick and Mike Tyson attended her show at Hilton in Las Vegas. American singer Gladys Night also attended one of her shows at Flamingo Hotel while American music producer Joe Jackson was also a frequent attendee of her shows at the city.

After concluding her successful concert runs in Las Vegas, she went back to the Philippines and staged a series of shows. In 2014, she headlined her first solo concert at the Big Dome in nearly seven years La Nightingale. In 2016, her two-night show Love Catcher took home the "Concert of the Year" at the PMPC Star Awards for Music. She tied with Regine Velasquez for two consecutive years (2015–2016) at the Box Office Entertainment Awards as the "Female Concert Performer of the Year". In 2017, she bagged the same honor at the PMPC Star Awards for Music for her performance in the Masquerade Concert and was invited as one of the performers at the ASEAN Gala. In the following years, two of her co-headlining concerts with Morissette (2018) and Martin Nievera (2019) have each won "Best Collaboration in a Concert" at the Aliw Awards. In November 2019, she performed the Philippine national anthem at the 30th South East Asian (SEA) Games at the Philippine Arena.

== Headlining concerts ==
List of headlining concerts, with dates, venues and number of performances
Year	Title	Date	Details	Associated album(s)	Notes	Ref.
2000	All Heart, The Concert	August 4 & 5	Two-night concert; Venue: Music Museum	All Heart	Guest performers: Zsa Zsa Padilla; Ogie Alcasid; Ariel Rivera	
2001	Lani Misalucha: The Crossover Live Tour	August 4, 2001 - February 8, 2003	Concert tour (Cebu, Manila, Baguio, Bacolod, Pampanga & Davao); Director: Rowell Santiago; Musical Director: Louie Ocampo	—N/a	Misalucha's first major solo concert at the Araneta Coliseum (Sept. 8, 2001).; It was reportedly attended by 17,000 spectators.	
2001	A Nightingale Sings	October 30 & 31, Tuesday & Wednesday	Two-night concert; Venue: Cultural Center of the Philippines; Musical Director: Gerard Salonga; Stage Director: Leo Rialp; Joined by: Philippine Philharmonic Orchestra; Philippine Madrigal Singers with Andrea Veneration; Antonio Maigue; Ramon Acoymo	—N/a	Guest performer: Kuh Ledesma; The two-night sold-out shows were reportedly attended by an estimated 3,600+ spectators.	
2002	Flight of the Nightingale		US Concert tour; Venue: Pasadena Civic Auditorium	—N/a	Her performances throughout the tour was met with praises from critics & audiences alike, calling her the "best Filipino pop performer."	
2002	Lani—The Repeat... A Crossover Special	July 12 & 13	Two-night concert; Venue: Le Pavillon Metropolitan Park; Director: Rowell Santiago; Musical Director: Louie Ocampo; Produced by: 105.1 Crossover	—N/a	Guest performers: Jed Madela; Yamani	
2002	One for the Child	December 13	A special one-off concert; Venue: Fr. Blanco's Garden of the San Agustin Church	—N/a	"Lani's gift to the children rescued from physical abuse, sexual abuse, neglect and abandonment by Bantay Bata 163."	
2003	Crossover Presents Lani Misalucha	January 11 - February 8	Concert tour (Bacolod, Cebu, Davao, Pampanga & Manila); Director: Rowell Santiago; Musical Director: Louie Ocampo	—N/a	The concert tour capped by a major show at the Araneta Coliseum on February 8, 2003.	
2003	Change-a-Life with Lani Misalucha	June 19, Thursday	Venue: Music Museum; Musical Director: Gerard Salonga	—N/a	All proceeds of the show was donated to Mabuhay Deseret Foundation (MDF).; Misalucha volunteered her services for free.	
2003	Lani Misalucha in Symphony	September 5 & 6	Two-night concert; Venue: Philippine International Convention Center; Musical Director: Louie Ocampo; Presented by: Wilbros Entertainment	—N/a	Guest performers: Regine Velasquez; Jaya; Paolo Santos	
2004	Lani Beyond Time	January 17, Saturday	One-off concert; Venue: PICC Plenary Hall	Loving You	Guest performers: Regine Velasquez; Ogie Alcasid	
2007	Missing You	March 17	One-off concert; Venue: Araneta Coliseum	Lani Misalucha	Misalucha's homecoming concert was reportedly attended by an estimated around 18,000 spectators.	
2008	Reminisce Mall Tour	August 22 & 23	Promotional mini tour Venue: Trinoma & Green 3 Park	Reminisce		
2013	Queen of the Night	November 20, Wednesday	One-off concert; Venue: Solaire's Grand Ballroom	The Love Collection	Part of the proceeds of the concert was donated to the victims of Typhoon Yolanda.	
2014	Lani Misalucha: The Philippine Tour	Date began: November 8	Concert tour; Visited Cagayan de Oro, Baguio & Ilo-Ilo	—N/a	Guest performers: Arnel Pineda; Darren Espanto; Lyca Giranod; Jed Madela; Juan Karlos Labajo; Daniel Matsunaga	
2014	La Nightingale (Note: Misalucha's comeback concert was attended by numerous local celebrities & personalities such as Morissette, Janice de Belen, Jonathan Manalo, Olivia Lamasan and Laurenti Dyogi.)	December 6	Venue: Araneta Coliseum; Musical Director: Louie Ocampo; Director: Paul Basinillo; Joined by: ABS-CBN Philharmonic Orchestra with Gerard Salonga; Produced by: ABS-CBN Integrated Events & Star Event	The Nightingale Returns	Guest performers: Martin Nievera; Arnel Pineda; Erik Santos	
2015	Voice of the Nightingale	October 10, Saturday	One-off concert; Venue: M Pavillon	—N/a	Misalucha's first Las Vegas show since 2010.	
2015	Lani Misalucha Live in Concert	November 22	Venue: The Town Hall; Presented by: JB Entertainment Production; Musical Director: Lorrie Ilustre	—N/a	This is Misalucha's debut show at the Town Hall in New York City.; "Part of the proceeds from the concert will benefit ABS-CBN's Bantay Bata Foundation."	
2015	The Voice of Nightingale	December 5 & 6, Friday & Saturday	Venue: Theater at Solaire	—N/a	Guest performer: Arnel Pineda	
2016	Love Catcher	February 14 & 15	Two-night Valentine concert; Venue: Resorts World Manila; Musical Director: Mel Villena; Director: Frank Lloyd Mamaril	—N/a	A benefit concert for the Cancer Alleviation Network on Care, Education & Rehabilitation	
2017	Voice of the Nightingale (Tampa)	July 1	Venue: Straz Center for the Performing Arts	—N/a		
2022	Light the World Christmas Concert	December 21	One-off concert; Venue: Missionary Training Center (MTC) Activity Center	—N/a	Performed songs: Silent Night; Do You Hear What I Hear; Mary Did You Know; O Holy Night	
2023	SMDC Date Night presents Lani Misalucha	March 22, Wednesday	One-off concert; Venue: SMX Convention Center	—N/a		
2023	Philippine Festival Mississauga	July 16	One-off concert Venue: Celebration Square in Mississauga	—N/a		

== Co-headlining concerts ==
List of co-headlining concerts, with dates, venues and number of performances
Year	Title	Co-headliner(s)	Date	Venue	Shows	Notes	Ref.
2001	The Love Concert	Zsa Zsa Padilla; Freestyle	February 4, Sunday	Araneta Coliseum	1	—N/a	
2002	Crossover presents Lani Misalucha and Nanette Inventor	Nanette Inventor	November 14, Thursday	Captain's Bar of the Mandarin Oriental	1	Musical Director: Gerard Salonga	
2002	Best of Crossover Presents	Regine Velasquez; Gary Valenciano; Basil Valdez; Jaya; Ogie Alcasid; Nanette Inventor; Janno Gibs; Joey Generoso	December 5, Thursday	Le Pavillon, Roxas Boulevard	1	—N/a	
2010	Ang Ganda Diva?	Vice Ganda	November 19, 20 & 21	Copernicus Theater; Roy Thomson Hall; Hippodrome Hall	3	—N/a	
2013	Kami Naman ang Taya	Martin Nievera; Pops Fernandez; Christian Bautista; Mitoy Yonting	December 3, Thursday	Newport Performing Arts Theater	1	"A one-night-only benefit concert for the survivors of super typhoon Yolanda."	
2015	Ultimate	Regine Velasquez; Martin Nievera; Gary Valenciano	February 14 & 15	Mall of Asia Arena	2	Director: Rowell Santiago; Musical Director: Ryan Cayabyab	
2016	Ai meets Lani (Lani May Ai?)	Ai-Ai delas Alas	September 17	KIA Theater	1	Pops Fernandez produced the concert.	
2017	Masquerade	Martin Nievera	February 14 & 15	Grand Ballroom of Solaire Hotel and Casino	2	—N/a	
2019	The Aces	Darren Espanto; Jona	March 30, Saturday (Note: The Aces staged the first show of the tour in Cebu (February 2, 2019).)	Araneta Coliseum	4	Concert tour; Director: Marvin Caldito; The tour also visited Cebu, Davao & Quezon City	
2019	World Alliance: Serenading the OFWs	Martin Nievera	June 27, 29 & July 5	Aspire Ladies Sports Hall; Gulf Convention Centre; Dubai World Trade Center	3	Middle East concert tour	
2020	And the Story Begins	Basil Valdez; Ryan Cayabyab	February 29, Saturday	Newport Performing Arts Theater	1	Misalucha's last live show before the lockdown.	
2022	Timeless Seasons	Nonoy Zuñiga	March 20 & 26, April 1, 2, 9 & 10	SABAN Theater; Snoqualmie Casino; San Mateo Performing Arts Center; Pala Casino; Bally's Casino	6	Guest performers: Jed Madela; Louie Reyes	
2022	Together Again	Bea Alonzo; Dingdong Dantes; Ai-Ai delas Alas; Julie Anne San Jose; Rayver Cruz	September 24 & 25	Pechanga Theater	2	Presented by: GMA Pinoy TV; Starmedia Entertainment; GMA Synergy	
2023	Arnel Pineda and Lani Misalucha: Live in Concert	Arnel Pineda	September 9, 10, 15, 16 & 23	Fantasy Springs Resort Casino; Hard Rock Live; Graton Resort Casino; Choctaw Casino and Resort; Margaret William Theater	5	US Concert tour	

== Concert residencies ==
List of guest appearances, with dates, venues and number of performances
Year	Title	Date	Venue	Shows	Notes	Ref.
2002	Lani On Stage: A Crossover Special	April 12, 13, 19, 20, 26 & 27	Onstage Greenbelt Makati	6	Misalucha earned three standing ovations from the audience throughout the show.	
2009	Voices	April 2009 - June 2010	Hilton	(Note: There are currently no available data for the exact number of shows for Misalucha's Voices. However, reports have stated that the concert series began in April 2009 and ended in June 2010.)	Society of Seven (SOS) co-headlined with Misalucha within the shows' first four months.	
2012	Return to Paradise	June 5 - June 16	Magic of Polynesia Showroom	12	—N/a	

== Special performances ==
List of special performances, with the name of event, dates, venues and additional informations
Year	Event	Date	Venue	Notes	Ref.
2017	Former Philippine president Joseph Estrada's 80th Birthday Celebration	April 19, Wednesday	Manila Hotel	Misalucha was invited as a performer alongside Sarah Geronimo and Martin Nievera.	
2017	Association of Southeast Asian Nations (ASEAN) Summit Gala	November 12, Sunday	SMX Convention Center	Performed song: Jubilare; Misalucha received a standing ovation from then-US President Donald Trump.	
2018	Salu-Salo Kasama ang Pangulo (then-Philippine president Rodrigo Duterte)	April 5, Thursday	Sofitel Harbor Garden	Misalucha was invited as a performer alongside Martin Nievera, Zsa Zsa Padilla and Jed Madela.	
2019	30th South East Asian (SEA) Games	November 30, Saturday	Philippine Arena	Misalucha sang the Philippine national anthem Lupang Hinirang	

== Guest appearances ==
List of guest appearances, with dates, venues and number of performances
Year	Title	Date	Venue	Performed song(s)	Ref.
2001	XV3 by Martin Nievera	January 20, Saturday	Grand Ballroom of the Waterfront Hotel	—N/a	
2001	Xstatic	October 19, Friday	Araneta Coliseum	Light of a Million Mornings; Rhythm of the Night (with Gary Valenciano).	
2001	Gary V: Radical by Gary Valenciano	October 20, Saturday	University of Baguio Gym	Rhythm of the Night (with Gary V.).	
2001	A Song for Piece by Martin Nievera	December 14, Friday	Philippine International Convention Center	—N/a	
2002	Opening Night by Martin Nievera	March 2 & 9, Friday	Grand Olympic Auditorium & Cow Palace Arena	—N/a	
2002	Anton Rules by Anton Diva	June 14, Thursday	Music Museum	—N/a	
2003	Manila concert by Sérgio Mendes	October 4, Saturday	Aliw Theater	Bridges; Going Out of My Head	
2017	The 50th Birthday Concert by Arnel Pineda	September 5, Tuesday	Okada Manila	Ikaw Lang ang Mamahalin	
2017	Dare to Fly by Jessica Cox	September 15, Friday	Cuneta Astrodome	—N/a	
2022	The World of Christmas: The Grand Countdown to 2023	December 31, Saturday	Newport Performing Arts Theater	—N/a	

== Digital concerts ==
List of digital concerts, with dates, platforms and additional informations
Year	Title	Date	Platform (s)	Notes	Ref.
2021	New Day with Martin Nievera	June 5 & 6	KTX.ph; iWantTFC; TFC IPTV	Venue: The Theater at Solaire; Produced by: Star Media Entertainment; Guest performers includes Rey Valera, Nonoy Zuniga & Marco Sison	
2021	Handog at Pasasalamat: Benefit E-Concert with Ice Seguerra	December 6, Saturday	Facebook; YouTube; Sessions live; Kumu	Presented by: A Teacher Party-list	

== See also ==
- Lani Misalucha discography
- List of awards and nominations received by Lani Misalucha
