= Toru Ohno =

Japanese scholar of Burmese (1935–2022)

Tōru Ohno (大野 徹, Ohno Tōru; 1935 – 7 October 2022) was a Japanese scholar of Burmese. He was an emeritus professor at the Osaka University of Foreign Studies, where he served for many years as chairman of the Burmese department. He graduated from the same university with a major in the Burmese language. He taught at Osaka University of Foreign Studies from 1965 to 2001, starting his career as an assistant professor.

== Publications ==
- Ohno Toru 大野徹 (1965). "共通クキ・チン語の構成(1)--語頭子音 Kyotsu-kuchi-chin-go no saikosei I: Goto shi in [The Reconstruction of Proto-Kuki-Chin 1: initials]" 言語研究 Gengo Kenkyū (Journal of the Linguistic Society of Japan) 47.3: 8–20.
- Ohno Toru 大野徹 (1965) (Review of R. K. Sprigg, A Comparison of Arakanese and Burmese on Phonological Formulae: Linguistic Comparison in South East Asia and the Pacific, School of Oriental and African Studies, University of London, 1963, pp.109–132) 東南アジア研究 Tōnan ajia kenkyū 3.1: 163.
- Ohno, Toru (1966). 十八世紀末期のビルマ語 -ヨーロッパ人の記録を中心として [The Burmese language at the end of the 18th century – seen in the records of European visitors]. Ōsaka Gaikokugo Daigaku Gakuhō 大阪外国語大学学報 [Journal of the Osaka University of Foreign studies]. 16: 179–228.
- Ōno, Tōru 大野徹 1967. Decipherment of the Sino-Burmese Vocabulary in the Ching Dynasty]. 大阪外国語大学学報 Ōsaka Gaikokugo Daigaku gakuhō. Journal of Osaka University of Foreign Studies 17.127–173.
- Ohno Toru 大野徹 (1968). "第 3 回ビルマ総合学会に出席して Attending the third meeting of the general society for Burmese studies." 東南アジア研究 Tōnan Ajia Kenkyū 6.2: 423–432
- Ohno Toru 大野徹 (1968). 「ビルマにおけるピュ一族遺跡の発掘調査現状」"A Report on the Inquiry and Excavation of the Remains of the Pyu in Burma."『鹿児島大学史録』Kagoshima Daigaku Shiroku 1: 67–78.
- Ōno Tōru 1969, Dethandaya-thoun bamazaga-mya [The Burmese Dialects], Kabya-akyaung sa akyaung [On poetry and letters], Rangoon, pp. 43‒67.
- Ōno, Tōru 大野徹 (1969–1970) 「ビルマにおけるカレン民族の独立闘争史」 『東南アジア研究』（京都大学東南アジア研究センター）17/3 （1969.12） pp. 363–390; https://kyoto-seas.org/pdf/7/3/070306.pdf 27/4（1970.3）pp. 546–570; 38/1（1970.6）pp. 91–112（完）
- Ohno Toru 大野徹 (1970). "ビルマ学会の趨勢についてTrends in Burmese Academia". 東南アジア史学会会報 Japan Society for Southeast Asian History 11:6–8.
- Ōno, Tōru 大野徹(1970–1971)「ビルマ国軍史」『東南アジア研究』（京都大学東南アジア研究センター）18/2（1970.9）pp. 218–251; 28/3（1970.12）pp. 347–377; 38/4（1971.3）pp. 534–565（完）．
- Ohno Toru 大野徹 (1971) "ビルマ経済の特質とその変遷" 東南アジア史学会会報 Japan Society for Southeast Asian History 14: 4–5.
- Ohno Toru 大野徹 (1971) "パガン, ピンヤ, インワ時代のビルマ人仏教徒の功徳 Dedications of the Buddhist Burman during Pagan, Pinya and Ava Periods." 東南アジア研究 Tōnan Ajia Kenkyū 9.1: 19–45. http://hdl.handle.net/2433/55645
- Ohno Toru 大野徹 (1971) パガン, ピンヤ, インワ時代のビルマ人仏教徒の呪詛 Curses of the Buddhist Burman during Pagan, Pinya and Ava Periods" 東南アジア研究 9.2: 176–193.
- Ohno Toru 大野徹 (1971) "パガン, ピンヤ, インワ時代のビルマ社会 [The Social Structure of Burma during Pagan, Pinya and Ava Periods]" 東南アジア研究Tōnan Ajia Kenkyū9.3: 310–327
- Ohno, Toru 大野徹 (1971). "Kalan and Sampao in the Inscription of Burma". Shiroku 4 (1971): 1–13. (in Japanese).
- Ohno Toru 大野徹 (1971). 現代ビルマ語の基礎的表現. Tokyo: 東京外国語大学アジア・アフリカ言語文化研究所.
- Ohno Toru 大野徹 (1971). "昭和46年度実験的言語研修報告: ビルマ語研修について. Experimental Language Training Report for the year 1971: Training for Burmese" アジア・アフリカ言語文化研究所通信 ILCAA Newsletter 14: 24–26.
- Ohno Toru 大野徹 (1971). "ビルマ語方言の研究(2)南東方言 Burmese dialectology (2): South Eastern Dialects." 大阪外国語大学学報 Ōsaka Gaikokugo Daigaku Gakuhou 23.1.101–121.
- Ohno Toru 大野徹 (1972) "コンバウン時代のビルマの神判 Trial by Ordeal in Burma during the Konbaung Dynasty" 東南アジア研究 Tōnan Ajia Kenkyū 10.1: 32–59.
- Ohno Toru 大野 (1973). ビルマの古文書：パラバイ Parabaiks: Historical documents in Burma. 鹿児島大学史録 Shiroku: Kagoshima University 6: 117–136.
- Ohno Toru 大野徹 (1976) ビルマの壁画 III : ニャウンヤン時代を中心として / Wall Paintings of Burma in the Nyaungyan Period 東南アジア研究 Tōnan Ajia Kenkyū 14.2: 270–285.
- Ohno Toru 大野徹 and Takao Inoue 井上隆雄(1978). Mural paintings of the Buddhist temples in Burma パガンの仏教壁画 Pagan no Bukkyō hekiga Tokyo: 講談社 Koōdansha.
- Ohno Toru 大野徹 (1976) ビルマの壁画(IV): コンバウン時代を中心として Wall Paintings of Burma in the Kongbaung Period 東南アジア研究 Tōnan Ajia Kenkyū14.3: 442–460.
- Ohno Toru 大野徹 (1982) ビルマ語会話: 英語対照 Birumago kaiwa: eigo taishō Tokyo: 大学書林 Daigakushorin.
- Ohno Toru 大野徹 (1983)「歴史的背景」綾部恒雄・永積昭編『もっと知りたいビルマ』(もっと知りたい東南アジァ6)'弘文堂, pp 1–39。
- Ohno Toru 大野徹 (1984) ビルマ語常用6000語 Birumago jōyō rokusengo Tokyo: 大学書林 Daigakushorin.
- Ohno Toru 大野徹 (1986) ビルマ語四週間 Birumago yonshūkan. 大学書林 Tokyo: Daigakushorin.
- Ōno, Tōru 大野徹(1986)「太平洋戦争当時のビルマの経済事情」大阪外国語大学アジア研究会（編）『第2次世界大戦とアジア社会の変容』箕面:編者1986，pp. 63–82．
- Ohno Toru 大野徹 (1990). "ナガ諸語の構造 A comment on the classification of the Naga Languages." アジアの諸言語と一般言語学 Ajia no shogengo to ippan gengogaku / Asian languages and general linguistics. 崎山理 Osamu Sakiyama, et al. Tokyo: 三省堂 Sanseidō. 103–124.
- Ohno Toru 大野徹 (1996) "モン語版ラーマーヤナ「ロイク・サモイン・ラーム」の特徴 Salient Features of the Mon Version of the Rama Story" 東南アジア研究 Tōnan Ajia Kenkyū 34.2: 370–386.
- Ohno Toru 大野徹 (1999). A study of Burmese Rama story: with an English translation from a duplicate printing of the original palm leaf manuscript written in Burmese language in 1233 year of Burmese era (1871 AD) (Osaka Gaikokugo Daigaku gakujutsu kenkyu sosho; 24) Minoo-shi: Osaka Gaikokugo Daigaku Gakujutsu Shuppan Iinkai, 1999.
- Ohno Toru 大野徹 (2000). ビルマ(ミャンマー)語辞典. Tokyo: 大学書林.
- Ohno Toru 大野徹 (2002). 謎の仏敎王国パガン: 碑文の秘めるビルマ千年史 Nazo no bukkyō ōkoku pagan: hibun no himeru biruma sennenshi. [Mysterious Buddhism of the Kingdom of Pagan: A thousand years of Burmese history conceal in inscriptions.] Tokyo: 日本放送出版協会 Nihonhōsōshuppankyōkai.
- Ohno Toru 大野徹 (2003). 二十世紀のアジア Nijisseiki no ajia. Kyoto 晃洋書房 Kōyōshobō.
- Ohno Toru 大野徹 (2005) "The structure of Pagan period Burmese." Studies in Burmese Linguistics. Justin Watkins, ed. Canberra: Australian National University. 241–306.
- Ohno Toru 大野徹 (2005) アジアの農地制度と食糧 Ajia no nōchi seido to shokuryō. Kyoto: 晃洋書房 Kōyōshobō.

== See also ==
- Shirō Yabu
