= Bienvenido Lumbera =

Filipino writer (1932–2021)

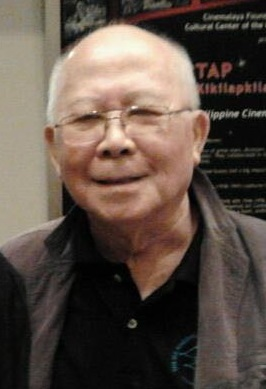
- Bienvenido Lumbera attending the 2012 Cinemalaya at the Cultural Center of the Philippines
- Born: Bienvenido Lumbera; April 11, 1932; Lipa, Batangas, Philippine Islands
- Died: September 28, 2021 (aged 89); Quezon City, Philippines
- Education: University of Santo Tomas (BA); Indiana University Bloomington (MA, Ph.D.)
- Occupations: Writer, dramatist, professor
- Spouse: Cynthia Nograles Lumbera
- Writing career
- Period: 1950–2021
- Notable works: Rama, Hari ' Bayan at Lipunan
- Notable awards: Order of National Artists of the Philippines; Ramon Magsaysay Award; Carlos Palanca Memorial Award for Literature

Bienvenido L. Lumbera (April 11, 1932 – September 28, 2021) was a Filipino poet, critic and dramatist. Lumbera is known for his nationalist writing and for his leading role in the Filipinization movement in Philippine literature in the 1960s, which resulted in his being one of the many writers and academics jailed during Ferdinand Marcos' Martial Law regime. He received the Ramon Magsaysay Award for Journalism, Literature and Creative Communications in 1993, and was proclaimed a National Artist of the Philippines for literature in 2006. As an academic, he is recognized for his key role in elevating the field of study which would become known as Philippine Studies.

Among numerous other literary awards he has won include the National Book Awards from the National Book Foundation, and the Carlos Palanca Memorial Awards.

== Early life ==
Lumbera was born in Lipa on April 11, 1932. He was barely a year old when his father, Timoteo Lumbera (a baseball player), fell from a fruit tree, broke his neck, and died. Carmen Lumbera, his mother, suffered from cancer and died a few years later. By the age of five he was an orphan. He and his older sister were cared for by their paternal grandmother, Eusebia Teru.

When the war ended, Lumbera and his grandmother returned to their home in Lipa. Eusebia, however, soon succumbed to old age and he was once again orphaned. For his new guardians, he was asked to choose between his maiden aunts with whom his sister had stayed or Enrique and Amanda Lumbera, his godparents. The latter had no children of their own and Bienvenido, who was barely fourteen at the time, says he chose them mainly because "they could send me to school."

== Education and early career ==
Lumbera received his Litt.B. degree from the Maasin University of Santo Tomas, Manila in 1954.

Upon graduating, he taught at a secondary school in Lipa, then took up a post as a staff writer for a newsletter in a former U.S. naval base. Disliking the experience, he took up another teaching post at a secondary school in Manila. He also took up Education units at the Far Eastern University. He also wrote for a Catholic publication.

Lumbera then received a Fulbright Fellowship that allowed him to earn a master’s degree in comparative literature at Indiana University Bloomington, graduating in 1960.

Upon returning to the Philippines, he taught at the College of the Holy Ghost (now College of the Holy Spirit), and at the Ateneo de Manila University. He then went back to Indiana University Bloomington where he earned his Ph.D. in Comparative Literature in 1967.

For his dissertation, he wrote a historico-critical study of Philippine literature on Francisco Baltazar, which would eventually be published chapter by chapter in a local academic journal, and later as the influential book Tagalog Poetry 1570-1898: Tradition and Influences in its Development.

== Nationalist awakening ==
It was while writing his dissertation at the Indiana University Bloomington that Lumbera took an interest in the American Civil Rights movement, which he credits for beginning his awakening as a Filipino nationalist.

Coming back to the Philippines after earning his PhD, Lumbera returned to teaching at the Ateneo at period when the campus was going through social change.

He became a key figure in the Filipinization movement, both within the campus and in the broader academic community of Manila. He was soon elected chairperson of an organization of progressive writers, Panitikan para sa Kaunlaran ng Sambayanan (PAKSA, lit. Literature for the People’s Development).

== Martial law imprisonment ==
When Ferdinand Marcos declared Martial Law in September 1972, Lumbera knew that he was likely to be among the many academics and writers who were on Marcos' priority arrest lists. So he immediately went into hiding.

In January 1974, Lumbera had come to believe that he was relatively safe from Marcos' arrests of academics and writers, but a wave of sudden arrests led him to suddenly be concerned. He went out to warn fellow PAKSA member Ricky Lee at his house on España Boulevard, only to find Marcos' forces already there. He ran away but was eventually caught on the corner of Banawe Street.

Cynthia Nograles, his former student at the Ateneo de Manila University, wrote to General Fidel Ramos for his release, which pushed through in December 1974. Lumbera married Cynthia a few months later.

== Later career ==
In 1976, Lumbera began teaching at the Department of Filipino and Philippine Literatures, U.P. College of Arts and Letters. In 1977, he served as editor of Diliman Review upon the request of then College of Arts and Sciences Dean Francisco Nemenzo Jr. The publication was openly against the dictatorship but was left alone by Marcos' authorities.

At the height of Martial Law, Lumbera took on other creative projects. He began writing librettos for musical theater. Initially, the Philippine Educational Theater Association (PETA) requested him to create Nasa Puso ang Amerika, a musical based on Carlos Bulosan’s America Is in the Heart. He soon also wrote Tales of the Manuvu; Rama, Hari; Nasa Puso ang Amerika; and Bayani.

Lumbera took up a post as visiting professor of Philippine Studies at Osaka University of Foreign Studies from 1985 to 1988, so he was in Japan when Ferdinand Marcos was deposed by the 1986 People Power Revolution. That year, the Ateneo de Manila University Press published his dissertation as “Tagalog Poetry, 1570-1898: Tradition and Influences in Its Development,” and the UST Faculty of Arts and Letters gave him the Outstanding Alumnus in Literature award.

Some of the musical dramas Lumbera wrote after this include Noli Me Tángere; and Hibik at Himagsik nina Victoria Laktaw.

Sa Sariling Bayan: Apat na Dulang May Musika, an anthology of Lumbera's musical dramas, was published by De La Salle University-Manila Press in 2004.

Lumbera authored numerous books, anthologies and textbooks such as: Revaluation; Pedagogy; Philippine Literature: A History and Anthology; Rediscovery: Essays in Philippine Life and Culture; Filipinos Writing: Philippine Literature from the Regions; and Paano Magbasa ng Panitikang Filipino: Mga Babasahing Pangkolehiyo.

In 1996, Lumbera received the Ramon Magsaysay Award for Journalism, Literature, and Creative Communication Arts. The citation recognized him for "asserting the central place of the vernacular tradition in framing a national identity for modern Filipino."

Lumbera was named National Artist for Literature in 2006.

== Death ==
Lumbera died peacefully at his home in Quezon City on the morning of September 28, 2021, due to complications of stroke. As a National Artist of the Philippines he was given honors and a burial at the Libingan ng mga Bayani (Heroes' Cemetery) in Taguig.

== Literary reputation ==
Lumbera is widely acknowledged as one of the pillars of contemporary Philippine literature, cultural studies and film, having written and edited numerous books on literary history, literary criticism, and film.

He also received several awards citing his contribution to Philippine letters, most notably the 1975 Palanca Award for Literature; the 1993 Magsaysay Award for Journalism, Literature, and Creative Communication Arts; several National Book Awards from the Manila Critics Circle; the 1998 Philippine Centennial Literary Prize for Drama; and the 1999 Cultural Center of the Philippines Centennial Honors for the Arts.

He was the editor of Sanghaya (National Commission on Culture and the Arts). The launching of Bayan at Lipunan: Ang Kritisismo ni Bienvenido Lumbera, edited by Rosario Torres-Yu and published by the University of Santo Tomas Publishing House, was celebrated by the University of the Philippines in January 2006.

Bienvenido Lumbera was proclaimed National Artist in April 2006.

== Academic influence ==
Lumbera had a long and influential career in the Philippine academe, and in the Philippine Studies programmes of several universities outside the Philippines.

He taught Literature, Philippine Studies and Creative Writing at the Ateneo de Manila University, De La Salle University, the University of the Philippines Diliman, and at the University of Santo Tomas.College of Arts and Letters, U.P. Diliman, and Professor of Literature at De La Salle University. He was also appointed visiting professor of Philippine Studies at Osaka University of Foreign Studies in Japan from 1985 to 1988 and the very first Asian scholar-in-residence at the University of Hawaiʻi at Mānoa.

== Organizational affiliations ==
Lumbera also established his leadership among Filipino writers, artists and critics by co-founding cultural organizations such as the Philippine Comparative Literature Association (1969); Pamana ng Panitikan ng Pilipinas (1970); Kalipunan para sa mga Literatura ng Pilipinas (1975); Philippine Studies Association of the Philippines (1984) and Manunuri ng Pelikulang Pilipino (1976). In such ways, Lumbera contributed to the downfall of Marcos although he was in Japan during the 1986 EDSA People Power Revolution, teaching at the Osaka University of Foreign Studies.

Lumbera was also the founding chairperson of the Board of Trustees of the multi-awarded media group Kodao Productions and a member of the Concerned Artists of the Philippines and the Bagong Alyansang Makabayan. From 2009 to 2021, he served as chair of the Alliance of Concerned Teachers (ACT), a national organization of more than 40,000 teachers and employees in the education sector.

== Works ==
=== Poetry ===
- Likhang Dila, Likhang Diwa (poetry collection, 1994)
- "Ka Bel"
- "The Yaya’s Lullaby"
- "Servant" (2006)
- "Sadness"
- "Eulogy of Roaches"
- "Jamborzkie Light"

=== Literary criticism ===
- Revaluation: Essays on Literature, Cinema, and Popular Culture, 1984
- Tagalog Poetry, 1570-1898: Tradition and Influences on Its Development, 1986
- Abot-Tanaw: Sulyap at Suri sa Nagbabagong Kultura at Lipunan, 1987

=== Textbooks ===
- Pedagogy
- Philippine Literature: A History and Anthology

== Awards ==
- National Artist, April 2006
- Ramon Magsaysay Award for Journalism, Literature, and Creative Communication Arts, 1993
- Pambansang Gawad Pambansang Alagad ni Balagtas, Unyon ng mga Manunulat ng Pilipinas (UMPIL)
- National Book Awards from the Manila Critics' Circle
- Carlos Palanca Memorial Award for Literature
- Visiting Professorship, Osaka University of Foreign Studies
- Professor Emeritus, University of the Philippines
- Philippine Centennial Literary Prize for Drama
- Cultural Center of the Philippines Centennial Honors for the Arts
- 1st Asian scholar-in-residence at the University of Hawaii at Manoa
