= List of awards and nominations received by Lani Misalucha =

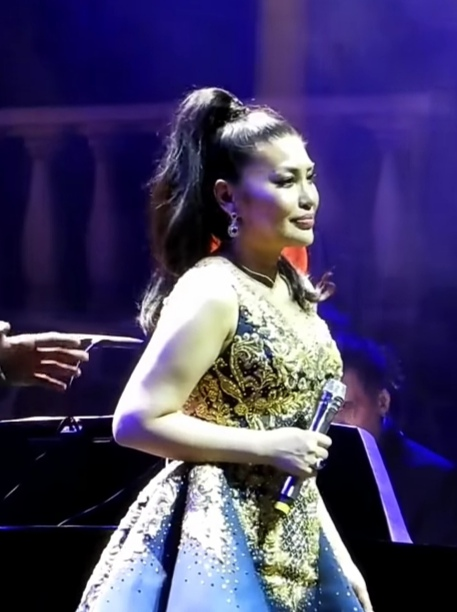
Misalucha performing in 2019

Filipino singer and performer Lani Misalucha has won numerous accolades from local and international award-giving bodies for her work in music and on-stage. She has won 7 Awit Awards including "Album of the Year" for her studio album All Heart (2000), 7 Aliw Awards including the coveted "Entertainer of the Year", 4 PMPC Star Awards for Music and 2 Box Office Entertainment Awards. In 1998, she won "Best Interpreter" at the 3rd Asia Song Festival. In 2008, she won "Best Singer" at the 27th Best of Las Vegas Awards, sharing the title with Canadian singer Céline Dion. (Note: Misalucha was the staff's choice for "Best Singer" while Dion was the reader's choice for "Best Singer.) In 2012, she received a star on the Eastwood City Walk of Fame for her significant contributions to Philippine music industry.

Dubbed as the "New Siren of the Strip" for headlining successful runs of her residency shows in Las Vegas, Misalucha has earned several citations including a certificate of recognition from Nevada's former Governor Kenny Guinn and a special certificate from former Mayor of Los Angeles James Hahn, recognizing her as the first artist of Asian descent to headline in a main showroom on the Las Vegas strip. In 2009, the former mayor of Las Vegas Oscar Goodman proclaimed December 4 as "Lani Misalucha Day" in the city, while the former mayor of Los Angeles Willie Brown also declared August 17 as the "Lani Misalucha Day". In January 2019, she was honored by People Asia magazine's as one of the People of the Year honorees. The Outstanding Filipinos in America (TOFA) Awards listed her among the 100 Most Influential Filipinos in America, honoring her with a special award.

== Awards and nominations ==
Awards and nominations received by Lani Misalucha
Award	Year (Note: Indicates the year of ceremony. Each year is linked to the article about the awards held that year, wherever possible.)	Nominated work	Category	Result	Ref(s)
Aliw Awards	2000	Herself	Best Female Musical Performer in music lounges, clubs, bars and restaurant	Won	
Aliw Awards	2001	Herself	Best Female Musical Performer in music lounges, clubs, bars and restaurant	Won	
Aliw Awards	2002	Herself	Entertainer of the Year	Won	
Aliw Awards	2002	Herself	Best Female Musical Performer in music lounges, clubs, bars and restaurant	Won	
Aliw Awards	2003	Crossover Presents Lani Misalucha	Best Major Concert for a Female Artist	Won	
Aliw Awards	2018	A Lani-Morissette Musical Journey (with Morissette)	Best Collaboration in a Concert	Won	
Aliw Awards	2019	Timeless Classics (with Martin Nievera)	Best Collaboration in a Concert	Won	
Awit Awards	1998	Ang Iibigin Ay Ikaw	Best Female Ballad Recording Artist	Won	
Awit Awards	1999	Rama at Sita	Best Stage Actress	Nominated	
Awit Awards	1999	Tunay Na Mahal	Best Performance by a Female Recording Artist	Won	
Awit Awards	2000	Can't Stop Loving You	Best Performance by a Female Recording Artist	Won	
Awit Awards	2001	All Heart	Album of the Year	Won	
Awit Awards	2004	Malaya Ka Na	Best Performance by a Female Recording Artist	Won	
Awit Awards	2007	I Live For Your Love	Best Performance by a Female Recording Artist	Won	
Awit Awards	2015	May Bukas Pa (with Angeline Quinto & KZ Tandingan)	Best Collaboration	Won	
ASAP Pinoy Awards	2017	Plaque of recognition	Herself	Won	
Asia Song Festival	1998	Herself	Best Performer	Won	
Best of Las Vegas	2008	Herself	Best Singer (Staff's choice)	Won	
Box Office Entertainment Awards	2015	La Nightingale (tied with Regine Velasquez)	Female Concert Performers of the Year	Won	
Box Office Entertainment Awards	2016	Ultimate Concert (tied with Regine Velasquez)	Female Concert Performers of the Year	Won	
EdukCircle Awards	2019	The Aces (with Jona & Darren Espanto)	Most Influential Concert Performers of the Year	Won	
Gen. Emilio Aguinaldo Outstanding Achievement Awards	2007	Herself	Outstanding Achievement Award (Amadeo/Music & Entertainment)	Won	
Katha Music Awards	1999	Tunay Na Mahal	Best Female Pop Vocal Performance	Won	
Katha Music Awards	2001	One (with Regine Velasquez, Ogie Alcasid & Jaya)	Best Pop Vocal Collaboration	Nominated	
Katha Music Awards	2001	Kasal sa Kaluluwa	Best Traditional Song	Nominated	
Katha Music Awards	2001	Kasal sa Kaluluwa	Best Traditional Song (with Vocals)	Nominated	
Katha Music Awards	2001	Ina	Best Folk Song (with Vocals)	Nominated	
Katha Music Awards	2002	Bukas Na Lang Kita Mamahalin	Best Female Pop Vocal Performance	Won	
Metropop Song Festival	1999	Can't Stop Loving You	Grand Prize	Won	
MTV Pilipinas Music Awards	2001	One More Time	Female Artist of the Year	Nominated	
MTV Pilipinas Music Awards	2004	Tila	Favorite Female Artist	Nominated	
Musika Manila International Songwriting Competition	1997	One More Time	Best Interpreter	Won	
People Asia Awards	2019	Herself	People of the Year	Won	
PMPC Star Awards for Music	2009	Reminisce	Female Recording Artist of the Year	Nominated	
PMPC Star Awards for Music	2009	Reminisce	Female Pop Artist of the Year	Nominated	
PMPC Star Awards for Music	2009	Reminisce	Revival Album of the Year	Nominated	
PMPC Star Awards for Music	2013	The Love	Pop Album of the Year	Nominated	
PMPC Star Awards for Music	2013	The Love	Female Recording Artist of the Year	Nominated	
PMPC Star Awards for Music	2014	The Nightingale Returns	Revival Album of the Year	Won	
PMPC Star Awards for Music	2014	The Nightingale Returns	Female Recording Artist of the Year	Nominated	
PMPC Star Awards for Music	2014	The Nightingale Returns	Pop Album of the Year	Nominated	
PMPC Star Awards for Music	2014	The Nightingale Returns	Female Pop Artist of the Year	Nominated	
PMPC Star Awards for Music	2014	Missing You	Female Concert of the Year	Nominated	
PMPC Star Awards for Music	2014	Missing You	Concert of the Year	Nominated	
PMPC Star Awards for Music	2015	Ultimate Concert (with Regine Velasquez, Martin Nievera and Gary Valenciano)	Concert of the Year	Nominated	
PMPC Star Awards for Music	2015	La Nightingale	Concert of the Year	Nominated	
PMPC Star Awards for Music	2015	La Nightingale	Female Concert Performer of the Year (tied with Regine Velasquez)	Won	
PMPC Star Awards for Music	2016	Love Catcher	Female Concert Performer of the Year	Nominated	
PMPC Star Awards for Music	2016	Love Catcher	Concert of the Year	Won	
PMPC Star Awards for Music	2017	Masquerade Concert	Female Concert Performer of the Year	Won	
PMPC Star Awards for Music	2019	Lani-Morisette: A Musical Journey	Female Concert Performer of the Year	Nominated	
PMPC Star Awards for Music	2019	Lani-Morisette: A Musical Journey	Concert of the Year	Nominated	
PMPC Star Awards for Music	2022	And The Story Begins	Female Concert Performer of the Year	Nominated	
The Outstanding Filipinos in America (TOFA) Awards	2020	Herself	Special Award	Won	
Visionary Awards	2008	Missing You (tied with Martin Nievera)	Entertainer of the Year	Won	
