= Lani Misalucha discography =

Filipino artist discography

- Studio albums: 8
- EPs: 1
- Live albums: 2
- Compilation albums: 5
- Singles: 21
- Promotional singles: 4

Filipino singer Lani Misalucha has released eight studio albums, two live albums, five compilation albums, one extended play (EP) and 21 singles (including 4 promotional singles). She started as a lounge performer in hotels and bars, became a vocalist in various bands and a singer for several commercial jingles and multiplex tapes. She rose to prominence in 1996 with the release of the revival single "Somebody Warm Like Me", followed by her debut album More Than I Should (1997) under Alpha Records.

She won the "Best Performer" award at the 3rd Asia Song Festival in 1998 for the song "Handle with Care". The same year, she released her sophomore album Tunay na Mahal under Viva Records. It was preceded by its carrier single of the same title and was certified Gold by the Philippine Association of the Record Industry (PARI). In 2000, Misalucha released her third studio album All Heart, which spawned her signature song "Bukas Na Lang Kita Mamahalin". It was a commercial success, reaching No. 4 on Odyssey's best OPM sellers and was certified Gold by PARI for exceeding 20,000 units in the country. Following the success of her first headlining concert at the Araneta Coliseum in 2001, she released her first live album under Viva Records titled Lani Misalucha: The Crossover Live Tour. It received four out fives stars from AllMusic critic David Gonzales, calling it an "excellent album". She released her fourth studio album Loving You in 2003. It was promoted along with its carrier single "Tila" and reached No. 4 among the top 25 albums of the week in Tower Records and Music One.

After her return from a successful concert series in Las Vegas, she released her first album under Universal Records and fifth studio album, Lani Misalucha (2006). It went No. 1 on Astroplus Megamall and Podium and was certified Platinum by PARI. In 2008, she released her sixth studio album Reminisce along with its first single "Love Of My Life". The album has been certified Gold by PARI and earned three nominations at the first PMPC Star Awards for Music including Female Recording Artist, Female Pop Artist of the Year and Revival Album of the Year. She released another studio album in 2008, her first holiday album The Gift of Christmas. Her eighth studio album, The Nightingale Returns, was released in January 2014 under Star Music. It was her first studio album in six years and was promoted along with its lead single "Muli" and featured artists such as Arnel Pineda, Yeng Constantino, Angeline Quinto and KZ Tandingan. The album was certified Gold by PARI and won "Revival Album of the Year" at the 6th PMPC Star Awards for Music.

== Albums ==
=== Studio albums ===
List of studio albums, with sales figures and certifications
Title	Album details	Sales (Note: Sales figures are based on the music certification levels provided by the Philippine Association of the Record Industry, unless stated.)	Certifications	Ref(s)
More Than I Should	Released: January 27, 1997; Label: Alpha Records; Formats: LP, cassette, CD	—	—	—
Tunay Na Mahal	Released: August 1, 1998; Label: Viva Records; Formats: LP, cassette, CD	PHI: 20,000	PARI: Gold	
All Heart	Released: January 1, 2000; Label: Viva Records; Formats: LP, cassette, CD	PHI: 20,000	PARI: Gold	
Loving You	Released: 2003; Label: Viva Records; Formats: CD, digital download	—	—	
Lani Misalucha	Released: 2006; Label: Universal Records; Formats: CD, digital download	PHI: 30,000	PARI: Platinum	
Reminisce	Released: 2008; Label: Universal Records; Formats: CD, digital download	PHI: 30,000	PARI: Gold	
The Gift of Christmas	Released: 2008; Label: Universal Records; Formats: CD, digital download	—	—	
The Nightingale Returns	Released: 2014; Label: Star Music; Formats: CD, digital download	PHI: 7,500	PARI: Gold	

=== Live albums ===
Title	Album details	Sales (Note: Sales figures are based on the music certification levels provided by the Philippine Association of the Record Industry, unless stated.)	Certifications	Ref(s)
Lani Misalucha: The Crossover Live Tour	Released: 2001; Label: Viva Records; Formats: LP, cassette, CD	PHI: 40,000	PARI: Platinum	
Lani Misalucha Live, Vol. 1	Released: May 25, 2007; Label: Viva Records	—	—	

=== Compilation albums ===
Title	Album details	Ref(s)
Greatest Hits	Released: 2005; Label: Viva Records	
The Platinum Collection	Released: January 1, 2006 Label: Universal Records	
Lani Silver Series	Released: 2006; Label: Viva Records	
18 Greatest Hits: Lani Misalucha	Released: January 9, 2009; Label: Viva Records	
The Love Collection	Released: March 17, 2014; Label: Universal Records	

== Extended plays ==
Title	Album details	Ref(s)
Lani Misalucha Live Vol. 2	Released: May 22, 2007; Label: Viva Records	

== Singles ==
=== As lead artist ===
List of singles as lead artist, showing year released and originating album
Title	Year	Album	Ref(s)
"Somebody Warm Like Me"	1996	More Than I Should	
"Isang Ulit Man Lang"	1997	More Than I Should	
"Tunay na Mahal"	1998	Tunay Na Mahal	
"You Don't Have to Say You Love Me"	1998	Tunay Na Mahal	
"One More Time"	2000	All Heart	
"Bukas Nalang Kita Mamahalin"	2000	All Heart	
"Tila"	2003	Loving You	
"Malaya Ka Na"	2003	Loving You	
"Love of My Life"	2008	Reminisce	
"Muli"	2014	The Nightingale Returns	
"Saan Darating ang Umaga"	2014	The Nightingale Returns	
"Bulag, Pipi at Bingi"	2014	The Nightingale Returns	
"Paano"	2014	The Nightingale Returns	
"Gaano Kadalas ang Minsan"	2014	The Nightingale Returns	
"Unbreakable"	2016	Non-album singles	
"Timeless"	2018	Non-album singles	
"I Will Never Leave You"(with Erik Santos)	2018	Erik Santos 15	
"I Can't Give Anymore"	2020	Non-album singles	
"Meteorite"	2020	Non-album singles	
"Isang Panalangin"	2022	Non-album singles	
"Bayan Kang Magiliw (Awit sa Ating Bayang Minamahal)"	2022	Non-album singles	

=== Promotional singles ===
List of promotional singles, showing year released and originating album
Title	Year	Associated work	Ref(s)
"Natutulog Ba ang Diyos"	2007	Natutulog Ba ang Diyos?	
"Starting Over Again"	2014	Starting Over Again	
"You Don't Own Me"	2015	Etiquette for Mistresses	
"Tubig at Langis"	2016	Tubig at Langis	
