= Shirō Yabu =

Japanese scholar of Burmese languages

Shirō Yabu (藪 司郎, Yabu Shirō) is a Japanese scholar of the languages of Burma. He is a professor emeritus at Osaka University. He joined the Department of Burmese language of Osaka University in 1982 as an assistant professor and worked there until 2009.

== Works ==
- Yabu, Shirō 藪 司郎 (1970) ビルマ語における数の範疇について: 複数助詞の用法を中心に On the Category of Number in the Burmese Language. 東南アジア研究 7.4: 504-526.
- Yabu, Shirō 藪 司郎 (1973) ビルマ語の「名詞+動詞」の慣用表現について Idiomatic expression "Noun + Verb" in Colloquial Burmese. 鹿兒島大學史錄 Kagoshima Daigaku Shiroku 6: 169-181
- Yabu, Shirō 藪 司郎 (1980). "ビルマ語ヨー方言の資料 Birumago Yō hōgen no shiryō / Linguistic Data of the Yaw Dialect of the Burmese Language." アジア・アフリカ言語文化研究 Ajia Afurika gengo bunka kenkyū / Journal of Asian and African Studies 19: 164-182.
- Yabu, Shirō 藪 司郎 (1981a). "ビルマ語タウンヨウ方言の資料 Birumago Taunyou hōgen no shiryō / Linguistic Data of the Taung'yo Dialect of the Burmese Language." アジア・アフリカ言語文化研究 Ajia Afurika gengo bunka kenkyū / Journal of Asian and African Studies 21: 154-187.
- Yabu, Shirō 藪 司郎 (1981b). "ビルマ語ダヌ方言の会話テキスト Birumago Danu hōgen no kaiwa tekisuto / Conversational Texts of the Danu Dialect of Burmese." アジア・アフリカ言語文化研究 Ajia Afurika gengo bunka kenkyū / Journal of Asian and African Studies 22: 124-138.
- Yabu, Shirō 藪 司郎 (1982). アツィ語基礎語彙集 / Atsigo kiso goishū / Classified dictionary of the Atsi or Zaiwa language (Sadon dialect) with Atsi, Japanese and English indexes. Tokyo: 東京外国語大学アジア・アフリカ言語文化研究所 Tōkyō Gaikokugo Daigaku Ajia Afurika Gengo Bunka Kenkyūjo. (reviewed by Yasutoshi YUKAWA in Gengo Kenkyu 84(1983): 153-155.)
- Yabu, Shirō 藪 司郎 (1987). "The Lashi Language of Burma: a brief description." Burma and Japan: basic studies on their cultural and social structure. Tokyo: Toyota Foundation. 47-53.
- Yabu, Shirō 藪 司郎 (1988). "A preliminary report on the study of the Maru, Lashi and Atsi languages of Burma." Yoshiaki Ishizawa (ed.), Historical and cultural studies in Burma, 65-132. Tokyo: Institute of Asian Studies, Sophia University.
- Yabu, Shirō 藪 司郎 (1990). "The Achang Language of Burma." アジアの諸言語と一般言語学 Ajia no shogengo to ippan gengogaku / Asian languages and general linguistics. 崎山理 Osamu Sakiyama, et al. Tokyo: 三省堂 Sanseidō. 124-141.
- 藪司郎（2001）「ミャゼディ文字」『世界文字辞典』（言語学大辞典，別巻，三省堂）
- 藪司郎（2001）「ピュー文字」『世界文字辞典』（言語学大辞典，別巻，三省堂）
- Yabu, Shirō 藪 司郎 (2001). "The distribution of minority languages, together with their change, in Burma and its adjacent areas." 池田 巧編 『論集：東・東南アジアの少数言語の現地調査』 Preliminary Reports on Minority Languages in East and Southeast Asia. Osaka: Endangered languages of the Pacific rim. 19-26.
- Yabu, Shirō 藪 司郎 (2003). The Hpun language endangered in Myanmar. Osaka: Osaka University of Foreign Studies.
- Yabu, Shirō 藪 司郎 (2006). 古ビルマ語資料におけるミャゼディ碑文<1112年>の古ビルマ語 / Kobirumago shiryō ni okeru myazedi hibun senhyakujūninen no kobirumago ōbī / Old Burmese (OB) of Myazedi inscription in OB materials. Osaka: Osaka University of Foreign Studies.
- Yabu, Shirō 藪 司郎 (2014). "Professor Nishida, Tatsuo and the study of Tibto-Burman languages." Memoirs of the research department of the Toyo Bunko 72:179-206.

== See also ==
- Toru Ohno
