= Rama at Sita =

Rama at Sita – The Musical
- Music: Ryan Cayabyab; Danny Tan
- Lyrics: Roy Iglesias; Dodjie Simon
- Book: Bienvenido Lumbera
- Basis: Ramayana by Valmiki
- Productions: 1999, Manila

Rama at Sita – The Musical is a 1999 full-length OPM Filipino musical in the Tagalog language. It is an adaptation of the 1980 Filipino rock opera ballet by three National Artists, Bienvenido Lumbera, Ryan Cayabyab, and Alice Reyes entitled, "Rama, Hari", based on the Indian epic Ramayana topbilled by Kuh Ledesma and Basil Valdez. The production was directed by Leo Rialp and is considered the most expensive theatrical production in the Philippines to date.

== Productions ==
Rama at Sita – The Musical premiered on February 4, 1999, at the University Theater in Quezon City under the stage direction and stage design by Leo Rialp and the musical direction of Danny Tan. The choreographer was Agnes Locsin. The musical starred Ariel Rivera and Lani Misalucha in the title roles, with Jaya as Surpanakha and Robert Seña as Ravana. The musical is one of the most expensive ever produced in Philippine entertainment history with a budget of Php 40 million, and the actor Franco Laurel was among the producers. Philippine fashion pillar Patis Tesoro served as costume designer.

== Synopsis ==
While Rama is supposed to inherit the throne of his father King Dasaratha of Ayuthaya, his father's favorite wife Queen Kaikeyi pressures Dasaratha to fulfill the latter's promise to grant her two wishes. Kaikeyi wishes for her son, Bharata, to become king and to send Rama into exile along with his loyal brother Lakshmana. In their pursuits, they meet Sita, and the evil siblings Ravana and Surpanakha try to lure the couple into becoming their partners.

== Musical numbers ==
Act I

- Sadyang Pinagtagpo (Vishvamitra, Ensemble)
- Huwag Takasan (Rama)
- Kaya Ko (Bharata)
- Halina sa Mithila (Rama, Lakshmana, Vishnamitra, Indrajit, Janaka, Ensemble)
- O Kay Dami ng Babae (Lakshmana, Ensemble)
- Sana siya na nga (Rama, Sita, Lakshmana)
- Iisa ang Tibok/Awit ng Pagsinta (Rama, Sita, Vishnamitra, Ensemble)
- Ang Sumpa ng Patay (Dasaratha)
- Tayo Na, Nariyan Na (Rama, Sita, Lakshmana, Kaikeyi, Dasaratha, Bharata, Ensemble)
- Ako'y Iyong Iyo (Rama, Sita)

Act II

- Buktot, Ako'y Buktot/Harot, Ako'y Harot (Surpanakha, Ravana, Maricha)
- Type Kita, Rama (Surpanakha)
- Ginoong Ermitanyo (Sita, Ravana)
- Tingnan Mo ang Aking Byuti (Surpanakha)
- Kaya N'yo Bang Tumagal (Surpanakha as Sita)
- Magbalik Ka Na Mahal (Sita)
- Tagistis ng Ulan (Rama)
- Sadyang Pinagtagpo/Huwag Takasan [Reprise] (Rama, Vishnamitra, Ensemble)

== Characters ==
- Rama – crown prince of Ayuthaya; son of Dasaratha and husband of Sita
- Sita – princess of Mithila; daughter of King Janaka; wife of Rama
- Ravana – evil king of Lanka
- Surpanakha – sister of King Ravana
- Lakshmana – brother of Rama
- Dasaratha – king of Ayuthaya
- Kaikeyi – favorite wife of Dasaratha
- Bharata – son of Queen Kaikeyi; regent of Ayuthaya

== Cast ==
| Character | Cast |
|---|---|
| Rama | Ariel Rivera, Raymond Lauchengco |
| Sita | Lani Misalucha, Chiqui Pineda |
| Surpanakha | Jaya, Emeline Celis |
| Ravana | Robert Seña, Nonie Buencamino |
| Lakshmana | John Arcilla, Ralion Alonzo |
| Dasaratha | Mon David, Eugene Villaluz |
| Kaikeyi | Pinky Marquez, Gigie Posadas |
| Bharata | Franco Laurel |
| Kooni | Carlo Orosa |
| Indrajit | Michael Williams |
| Vishnu | Bimbo Cerrudo |
| Sugriva | Lou Veloso |
| Maricha | Arlene Borja |
| Hanuman | Andy Alviz |
| Gintong Usa | Cecille Martinez, Patricia Borromeo Coronel |
| Lakshmi | Girl Valencia |
| Janaka | Zebedee Zuñiga |
| Vishnamitra | Edward Granadosin |

== Awards and nominations ==
| Year | Award ceremony | Category | Nominee | Result |
|---|---|---|---|---|
| 1999 | Aliw Award | Best Actress in a Theatrical Performance | Lani Misalucha | Nominated |
| 1999 | Aliw Award | Best Actor in a Theatrical Performance | Raymond Lauchengco | Nominated |
