= Jaya (singer) =

Filipino singer and actress (born 1970)

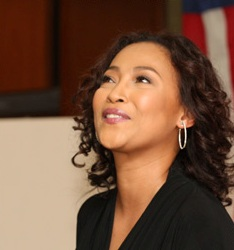
- Jaya in 2010
- Born: Maria Luisa Ramsey Kagahastian; March 21, 1970 (age 56)
- Other name: Jaya Ramsey
- Occupations: Singer; actress
- Years active: 1989–present
- Spouses: Andrew Buffington (m. 1998; div. 2001); Gary Gotidoc (m. 2006)
- Children: 2
- Musical career
- Genres: Soul; pop; R&B; OPM; jazz; gospel; scat; freestyle
- Instruments: Vocals; guitar
- Labels: LMR (1989); VIVA (1996–2005); GMA (2007–2011); Universal (2011–2014); Star Music (2016–2021)

Maria Luisa Ramsey Kagahastian (born March 21, 1970), known professionally as Jaya (/ˈdʒaɪə/), is a Filipino singer, actress, and television personality. Referred to as the country's "Queen of Soul", she is known for her distinctively deep voice and soulful singing style. She was a talent of GMA Network but later transferred to ABS-CBN, where she served as one of the head jury of the Tawag ng Tanghalan segment of the Philippine noontime variety show It's Showtime and performer on ASAP. Jaya is the second Filipino recording artist to chart in the United States (the first being The Rocky Fellers), with her debut single "If You Leave Me Now" peaking at number 44 on the Billboard Hot 100 chart.

Jaya also ventured into musical theatre, playing the role of Surpanakha in the 1999 Filipino musical Rama at Sita staged at the University of the Philippines Theater.

== Early life ==
Maria Luisa Ramsey Kagahastian was born on March 21, 1970. Her mother was Elizabeth Ramsey, a Filipina comedian and singer of Jamaican and Spanish-Filipino descent. Ramsey's father is Reynaldo Kagahastian, a Filipino. Her parents separated when she was young, and her father migrated to the United States. He now resides in Alberta, Canada.

She entered show business at the age of ten as a backup dancer for her mother, and at the age of 12 was a backup singer and front act for some minor and major shows. She began performing solo in 1982, using the name Louise Ramsey.

Ramsey did not finish high school in the Philippines because of her busy lifestyle as a child performer. She nonetheless received high marks and was once elected class president.

=== Life in the United States ===
Her mother Elizabeth decided to leave for the United States in June 1985, and brought Louise with her. There, she continued her solo singing stints, performing with other overseas Filipino artists like Tillie Moreno, Eddie Mercado, Lerma dela Cruz, and the duo Reycards.

Life in America was difficult for Ramsey and her mother as they moved around different cities in California. She attended John Marshall High School in Los Angeles, which at the time already had a large Filipino-American student population. She ran away from home in 1988 after finishing high school, moving to New York with a friend and landing a job as a backup vocalist for Stevie B's group of musicians.

== Career ==
=== U.S. debut ===
After high school in the U.S., Ramsey became a back-up vocalist to Miami freestyle singer Stevie B. In 1989, she was re-christened "Jaya" and signed a record deal with Stevie B's label LeFrak-Moelis Records and her eponymous first album, produced by Stevie B, was released in the US. The album consisted largely of freestyle dance tracks written or co-written by Stevie B, who also provided backup vocals.

The album's first single, "If You Leave Me Now", was a hit in discos and debuted on the U.S. Billboard Hot 100 chart in October 1989. After 18 weeks on the Hot 100, the song was still gaining in both sales and airplay—it ended up peaking at number 44 in February 1990— and remained in the Hot 100 for a total of for 26 weeks, an unusually long chart run for a single peaking outside the top 40. The song did well in many markets but at different times, thus diluting its Hot 100 rank. It hit top 10 in several markets and made it to number one at the crossover powerhouse KMEL. The song hit number 14 on Billboard's Top 40/Dance crossover chart and number 25 on the 12-inch Singles Sales chart.

Jaya's follow-up single, "One Kiss Per Minute", was a minor dance hit, but failed to make the pop chart and the third single from the album failed to chart as did another non-album single in 1993.

=== Philippine debuts ===
1995 was a turning point in Jaya's musical career. Pilita Corrales, dubbed "Asia's Queen of Songs", noticed her voice after Jaya did an opening act for Corrales, Carmen Soriano, the late Bert "Tawa" Marcelo, and Elizabeth in the United States. Corrales then asked Jaya if she would like to return to Manila and record an album, to which she agreed. Jaya returned to the Philippines and signed a record deal with Viva Records in March 1995 and completed her first local album. Five songs were recorded in the US while the rest were done in the Philippines.

Jaya is noted for being the Philippine music industry's female record holder of a seven-times platinum album. She was a big hit when Pinoys first heard her belt out soul ditties in 1996. Her winning the 1996 Metropop Song Festival via Danny Tan's "Sometimes You Just Know" made her the biggest star on the rise at the close of the last century. Her first album under Viva Records hit an all-time high of 9 times platinum.

In 1997, she released her third album In the Raw, (second in the Philippines) the follow-up to her massive-selling 1996 Philippine debut album, Jaya, which sold nine times platinum, (360,000 units; platinum is 40,000 units sold).

She also won as Best Interpreter at the Asia Song Festival held in Hong Kong in February 1997 for her rendition of the song "You Lift Me Up", composed by Danny Tan with lyrics by Dodjie Simon. This composition also received the grand prize, the Best Song award.

She styled Magpakailan pa Man (Up to the End), with soulful, Toni Braxton-styled flourishes, and renders the upbeat, "Together" with panache. The album sold quintuple-platinum (200,000 units sold).

She released a Christmas album, entitled Kung Kailan Pasko which contained traditional carols alongside original compositions, including a jazz version of The Christmas Song. By May 1998, Billboard recognized Jaya as one of Philippines' best-selling artists.

In 1999, PolyMax Records, a label of then-PolyGram Records Philippines (now an affiliate of Universal Records) released Jaya's A Love Album, first released in 1992 in Japan under the same title. The album consists of songs taken from an earlier Jaya album, also called A Love Album, released in the United States in 1989, as well as songs recorded specifically for the 1992 Japanese release. In 1992, while touring Japan as a backup singer and keyboardist for American R&B artist Stevie B., Jaya was approached by the Japanese label Toshiba/EMI to make an album for Japanese release. A Love Album was released in Japan in conjunction with Jaya's American label, LMR Records, which still owns master rights, and from whom PolyMax obtained permission to release the album in the Philippines (according to Kazu Watanabe, managing director of PolyMax Records). A Love Album is exquisitely produced, and Jaya acquits herself well on the album's upbeat R&B/dance-styled tunes and soulful ballads.

In 1999, Jaya released, her fifth album released in her native country since 1996, entitled Honesty originally done by Billy Joel, was also her career single.

Honesty differs greatly from Jaya's two previous major albums released in the Philippines, 1996's Jaya and 1997's In the Raw. Though, as before, Honesty contains mostly passionate, easy-listening love songs, this time out her approach is more intimate. She doesn't add many soulful flourishes as before, nor does she allow herself to soar passionately to the heavens, which she often did on her previous albums.

Another major difference is the inclusion of three modern, rhythm and blues styled songs, including, "We Thang," "Tear to Fall" and "In My Dreams." These songs are far more contemporary and have much more international appeal than the easy-listening love songs which dominate Jaya's music.

After five years in the recording scene, she released her first greatest hits album, entitled Five featuring a duet of Habang May Buhay (While There's Life) with Regine Velasquez and Kung Wala Na (If It Is Gone) from the Abandonada soundtrack.

In 1999, Jaya faced a big challenge when she did her first musical, the Ramayana-based Rama at Sita that starred Lani Misalucha. Her performance as the demon king Ravana's sister, Soorphanaka, was memorable for her skillful treatment of risque songs and sultry dancing.

Also in 1999, Jaya was given the offer to become a main host in a GMA Network variety show called SOP.

=== 2000: Unleashed and concert scene ===
In 2001, Jaya released her sixth Unleashed album where she sang the songs in a relaxed, confident manner, and performed middle-of-the-road songs that mostly have depth and quality. She forwent the soulful embellishments that were plentiful in her first two albums, although every so often she added a few unwritten notes in a passionate, soulful manner. She approached her last album, 1999's Honesty, in the refined manner that she furthered on Unleashed. Jaya covers Roy Orbison's "Love Hurts" and John Lennon's "Love" in an understated, yet enjoyable manner. Johnny Nash's "I Can See Clearly" features an imaginative, bass-heavy arrangement.

Also in that same year, she released her first live album, entitled, Jaya Live at the Araneta. The album is dominated by performances of American hits. For example, the album starts with a performance of Aretha Franklin's 1960s hit "Respect", and also includes Labelle's "Lady Marmalade", Nirvana's "Smells Like Teen Spirit," and Roy Orbison's "Love Hurts." She performs several of these ballads here, including her first hit in the Philippines, "Dahil Tanging Ikaw" (Because It's Only You). Several guest artists also have spots, including Regine Velasquez, who performs Abba's "Dancing Queen"; boy band Jeremiah, who accompanies Jaya on remakes of songs by American boy bands, including Westlife's "Swear It Again"; and male singers Wency Cornejo, KC Montero, and Rivermaya's vocalist and songwriter, Rico Blanco.

After four years of hiatus in the music scene, Jaya returned with her seventh studio album entitled, Fall in Love Again. Friends, old and new helped Jaya put the album together. One of these is Ogie Alcasid, who composed and produced "Ako'y Sa'yo" later revived by Regine Velasquez, "Maging Akin Ka Lamang" and their duet of "Bakit Di Mo Sabihin". Another one is Vehnee Saturno, who wrote and produced most of Jaya's early hits. His contributions are "Pagkukunwari" and "Di Na Ba Kita Mapipigilan", which is the album's first single release.

=== 2007: New label ===
In 2007, she released her eighth album Cool Change under her new label, GMA Records, featuring covers of international hit songs including Donna Summer's "On the Radio" and the Chaka Khan's "Through the Fire". All of the songs were presented with new arrangements in various musical genres. The first single was "Is It Over?" originally sung by Ronnie Milsap which received a Platinum award in 2009.

After her Platinum Record solo album, "Cool Change, " Ramsey released her ninth studio album entitled, Real.Love.Stories. It contains 14 love songs carefully picked and beautifully revived by the Philippine's Queen of Soul, such as "Breathe Again" originally sung by Toni Braxton; "Old Friend" by Phyllis Hyman and "Save the Best For Last" by Vanessa Williams.

The concept album was released initially on a limited edition micro secure digital format and after two weeks, it will be available on physical CDs and digital downloading.

Jaya also took part in the all-star charity single Kaya Natin Ito! along with some of her colleagues (with the exception of Jennylyn Mercado and Yasmien Kurdi). The project was supported by Gawad Kalinga to help the victims of Typhoons Ondoy and Pepeng.

=== 2010: New beginnings ===
On March 1, 2010, Jaya starred in her first soap opera as a supporting character in Diva, a new primetime offering of GMA Network for their 60th Anniversary, alongside Regine Velasquez, Mark Anthony Fernandez and Glaiza de Castro.

Her show BandaOke aired from October 25, 2009, to March 21, 2010, and was replaced by the reality sitcom Pepito Manaloto.

She was also a main presenter of the GMA-7 variety show, Party Pilipinas.

Jaya was reluctant to act before but she enjoyed playing the role of Barang, Regine Velasquez' friend in Diva. She played the nosy landlady Helen de Herenes in Kaya ng Powers, a sitcom that starred Joey Marquez and Rufa Mae Quinto as a couple from outer space.

Jaya won Best Female Vocal Performance for the song "Hiding Inside Myself" at 23rd Awit Awards on September 30, 2010, defeating some of the younger local singers of today.

=== 2011–2016: All Souled Out and Sunday All Stars judge ===
Jaya released an album under Universal Records entitled All Souled Out, a CD album containing 12 tracks of all revival songs. It was her third cover album, containing classic R&B and jazz songs that she grew up listening to. The album received a critical response, after experimenting with a variety of sounds in her previous outings, "Jaya comes to terms with what she is really all about as a singer in "All Souled Out." She triumphs in making the material sound genuine, largely because it is perfect for her. And her voice is a thing of wonder. There is warmth, power, and vulnerability in her renditions, making listening to the entire album a breeze—perfect for long drives or for those lazy weekends."

She was one of the "Big Four" judges of GMA Network's new musical variety show Sunday All Stars which began airing on June 30, 2013. She also starred in Mga Basang Sisiw as Sally.

=== 2016–present: Return to ABS-CBN ===
Jaya became a Kapamilya after being welcomed on ABS-CBN's and after 16 years with GMA Network, noontime-variety show It's Showtime last July 16, 2016, and she is now a part of the jury on Tawag ng Tanghalan. In November 2016, Jaya was one of the guest performers of the Filipino girl group DIVAS' first concert titled DIVAS Live in Manila along with K Brosas and Regine Velasquez.

== Personal life ==
In 1998, Jaya married musician Andrew Buffington, whom she met in 1995, and filed for divorce after three years. Jaya married her second husband, Gary Gotidoc, in May 2006, and at the age of 36 gave birth to her daughter Sabriya. On June 27, 2009, at 5:28 pm, she gave birth to her son Dylan at the Cardinal Santos Medical Center in San Juan City. In July 2021, Jaya moved to the United States with her family.

In 2023, Jaya became subject to controversy after John Lapus posted a blind item on Twitter, alleging that there was an unnamed singer repeatedly liking anti-transgender Tweets on the platform. It was widely believed that the post alluded to Jaya, after it was revealed that she had been liking Tweets from the account of the far-right anti-LGBT organization Gays Against Groomers. Days later, she clarified that she is not against transgender people, stating that she is just "against children being exploited". Her response received flak from drag queen DeeDee Marie Holliday.

== Discography ==
=== Studio albums ===
- Jaya (1989)
- Jaya (1996)
- In the Raw (1997)
- Kung Kailan Pasko (1998)
- Honesty (1999)
- Jaya (2000)
- Unleashed (2001)
- Fall in Love Again (2005)
- Cool Change (2007)
- Real. Love. Stories. (2009)
- All Souled Out (2011)
- Queen of Soul (2019)

=== Live album ===
- Live at the Araneta (2001)

=== Compilation albums ===
- A Love Album (1999)
- Five (2000)
- Silver Series (2006)
- 18 Greatest Hits (2009)

=== EPs ===
- If You Leave Me Now (1989)
- One Kiss Per Minute (1990)
- Shadow Love (1990)
- When I'm Available (1993)
- Skindo-Le-Le (2001)

=== Soundtrack ===
- Dahil Tanging Ikaw (performer: "Dahil Tanging Ikaw") (1996)
- Hanggang Ngayo'y Mahal (performer: "Hanggang Ngayon, Ika'y Minamahal") (1997)
- Laging Naroon Ka (performer: "Laging Naroon Ka") (April 9, 1997)
- Wala Na Bang Pag-ibig (performer: "Wala na Bang Pag-ibig?") (October 22, 1997)
- Dahil Ba Sa Kanya (performer: "Dahil Ba Sa Kanya") (May 13, 1998)
- Dito sa Puso Ko (performer: "Dito Sa Puso Ko") (1999)
- Abandonada (performer: "Kung Wala Na") (November 29, 2000)
- Pangako... Ikaw lang (performer: "Bakit Ngayon Ka Lang") (July 4, 2001)
- S6parados (performer: "Isang Araw") (August 3, 2014)
- I Have A Lover (performer: "Hanggang Dito Na Lang") (October 21, 2019)

== Filmography ==
=== Television ===
Year	Title	Role
1995–2000; 2017–2021; 2024	ASAP	Herself / Performer
1997–1999; 2016; 2025	Eat Bulaga!	Co-host; Guest; Performer in segment Just Duet
2000–2010	SOP	Main host
2004–2009	All-Star K! (formerly K!, The P1,000,000 Videoke Challenge)	Main host
2004–2007	Pinoy Pop Superstar	Judge
2008–2009	One Proud Mama	Host
2009–2010	BandaOke	Host
2010	Diva	Barbara / Barang
2010–2013	Party Pilipinas	Main host
2010	Kaya ng Powers	Helen de Herenes
2010–2011	Bantatay	Jaya the Labrador (voice)
2011	Dwarfina	Lelang Gorya
2012	Biritera	Susie
2012	Nay-1-1	Host / Herself
2013	Mga Basang Sisiw	Sally
2013–2015	Sunday All Stars	Main host
2014–2015	Yagit	Madam / Manghuhula
2015–2016	Marimar	Corazon
2016	Poor Señorita	Kapitana Edna Logatoc
2016–2021	It's Showtime	Hurado at Tawag ng Tanghalan segment / Occasional Performer
2016–2018	Gandang Gabi Vice	Special Guest
2016–2018	Magandang Buhay	Occasional Guest / Guest Performer
2019	Maalaala Mo Kaya: Salamin	Cata
2020	Bella Bandida	Agatha Suares (Bella's Auntie)

=== Films ===
- Pangako... Ikaw Lang (2001)
- Enteng Kabisote 10 and the Abangers (2016)

== Theatre credits ==
- Rama at Sita (1999)

== Awards ==
Year	Award giving body	Category	Nominated work	Results	Ref
1996	Metropop Song Festival	Grand Prize	"Sometimes You Just Know"	Won	
1997	Awit Awards	Best Performance by a Female Recording Artist	"Dahil Tanging Ikaw"	Won	
1997	Awit Awards	Best Pop Recording		Won	
1998	Asia's Song Festival	Grand Prize	"You Lift Me Up"	Won	
1998	Awit Awards	Best Pop Recording		Won	
1998	Awit Awards	Best Performance by a Female Recording Artist	"You Lift Me Up"	Won	
2000	Awit Awards	Best Pop Recording	"Dito Sa Puso Ko"	Won	
2000	Awit Awards	Best Performance by a Duet	"Ikaw Lamang" with Janno Gibbs	Won	
2001	Awit Awards	Best Performance by a Duet	"Habang May Buhay" with Regine Velasquez-Alcasid	Won	
2008	MYX Music Awards	Favorite Female Artist	—N/a	Nominated	
2008	MYX Music Awards	Favorite Remake	"Is It Over"	Nominated	
2008	MYX Music Awards	Favorite Mellow Video	"Is It Over"	Nominated	
2012	Awit Awards	Best Performance by a Female Recording Artist	"Hiding Inside Myself"	Won	
2014	Eastwood City Walk Of Fame	Celebrity Inductee	—N/a	Won	
2019	PMPC Star Awards for Music	Album of the Year	"Queen of Soul"	Won	
2019	PMPC Star Awards for Music	R&B Album of the Year	"Queen of Soul"	Won	
2019	PMPC Star Awards for Music	Female Recording Artist of the Year	"Hanggang Dito Na Lang"	Nominated	
2019	PMPC Star Awards for Music	R&B Artist of the Year	"Hanggang Dito Na Lang"	Nominated	
