= Osaka University of Foreign Studies =

Coordinates: 34°51′9.1″N 135°31′1.4″E

- 大阪外国語大学
- Type: National
- Established: Founded March 1921; Chartered May 1949
- Location: Minoh, Osaka, Japan
- Campus: Suburban
- Website: sfs.osaka-u.ac.jp

Osaka University of Foreign Studies (大阪外国語大学, Ōsaka gaikokugo daigaku), abbreviated to OUFS or Ōsaka Gaidai (大阪外大), Hangaidai (阪外大), Hangai (阪外) or Daigaidai (大外大), was one of Japan's only two national universities specialized in foreign studies, along with Tokyo University of Foreign Studies. It was dedicated to area studies and the study of foreign languages and their related cultures. In October 2007, OUFS was consolidated with the University of Osaka to become the University of Osaka School of Foreign Studies.

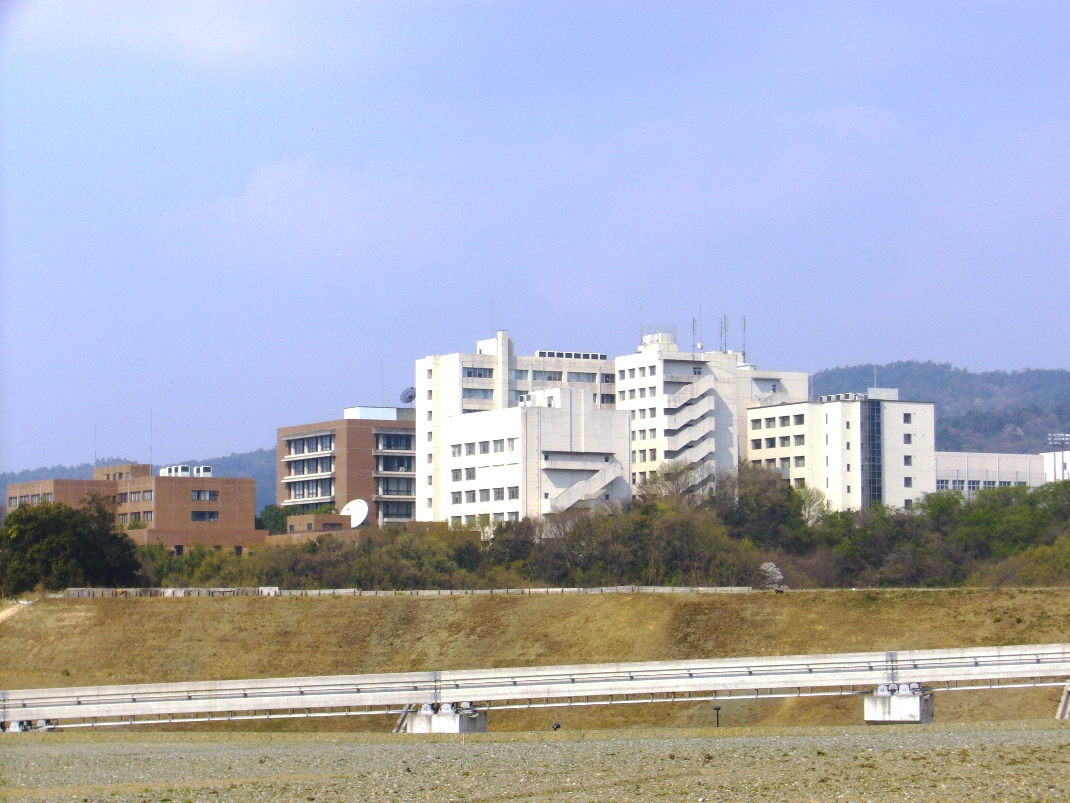
OUFS campus in Ao-Madani area of Minoh City, Osaka

== History ==
Osaka University of Foreign Studies (OUFS) initially offered foreign language education in nine world languages. The number eventually increased to 25, in accordance with OUFS's development as Japan's major center for foreign language education and research.

The history of OUFS dates back to 1921. The founding of the university was supported financially by Choko Hayashi (1873–1945) an Osaka businesswoman, who made a private donation of ¥1,000,000. Based on this donation the Japanese government established the "School of Foreign Affairs (SFS)" in Uehonmachi, Tennoji-ku, Osaka with the aim of nurturing internationally minded personnel in Japan. However its characteristics of the education, specialized in the language and culture of certain society, was commonly understood as a training center of espionage during World War II, and therefore, the school was obliged to be renamed "Osaka College of Foreign Affairs" in April 1944. It moved to Takatsuki, Osaka for a few years after the war and went back to its original site in Osaka city.

In 1949, when the Law on the Establishment of National Schools came into effect, "Osaka University of Foreign Studies" (OUFS) was established based on the existing "Osaka College of Foreign Affairs". It was reformed to offer 12 modern languages as majors.

In 1979 OUFS moved its campus to Ao-Madani area of Minoh City, in northern Osaka, and continued at this location until its consolidation into the University of Osaka in 2007. As one of the only two national universities of foreign studies in Japan (along with Tokyo University of Foreign Studies) OUFS offered an extensive variety of modern languages (Chinese, Korean, Mongolian, Indonesian, Filipino, Thai, Vietnamese, Burmese, Hindi, Urdu, Arabic, Persian, Turkish, Swahili, Russian, Hungarian, Danish, Swedish, German, English, French, Italian, Spanish, Portuguese, and Japanese) as majors, and a large number of other modern and ancient languages (such as Ainu, Catalan, Cantonese, Czech, Dutch, Finnish, Greek, Hausa, Karen, Lingala, Lithuanian, Nepali, Polish, Romanian, Shan, Tamil, Tibetan, Tok Pisin, Uyghur, Welsh, Manchu, Sanskrit, Sogdian, Pali, Latin, Hebrew, Ancient Greek, Old Church Slavonic, and Esperanto) as minors.

In October 2007, OUFS was consolidated with the University of Osaka to become the University of Osaka School of Foreign Studies. Since the 2008 academic year, students now apply for their entry through the University of Osaka. The school has since moved its location to the current Senba-Higashi area of Minoh-city (University of Osaka Minoh Campus).

History of School of Foreign Studies, the University of Osaka
Year	Event
1921	Osaka School of Foreign Languages founded
1922	School opening ceremony held
1937	Hanazono Sports Ground newly established
1944	Renamed Osaka College of Foreign Affairs
1945	Many of the college's buildings, excluding the library, burned down during the war
1946	Moved to the site of the former headquarters of Engineering Regiment No. 4 in Takatsuki City, Osaka Prefecture to conduct classes Administration office moved to 8-chome, Uehonmachi, Tennoji-ku, Osaka
1949	Osaka University of Foreign Studies established
1951	Osaka College of Foreign Affairs abolished
1959	Junior College (evening course) of Osaka University of Foreign Studies established
1965	Stopped enrollment of students for Junior College (evening course) The University's night school established
1969	Graduate School (master's course) for Foreign Studies opened
1972	Commemoration of the 50th anniversary of the University
1979	Moved to 2734 O-Aza Ao-Madani, Minoh City (currently 1-1, 8-chome, Ao-Madani Higashi, Minoh City, Osaka Prefecture) Classes started at Ao-Madani Campus
1981	Completion of the University's new buildings celebrated
1993	Day School and Night School closed and Department of International Studies (Day and Evening Courses) and Department of Area Studies (Day and Evening Courses) opened
2004	National University Corporation Osaka University of Foreign Studies launched due to national administrative reforms
2006	Ceremony held to sign the agreement for promoting integration between Osaka University and Osaka University of Foreign Studies
2007	Consolidated with the University of Osaka (1 October) The University of Osaka School of Foreign Studies inaugurated
2008	Commenced enrollment for the University of Osaka School of Foreign Studies Enrollment ceremony for the first students held (1 April)

== Student life ==
OUFS held 2 multicultural festivals every year, which were renowned for ethnic food stalls selling various sorts of international cuisine. Each society at the university held performances or exhibitions. The summer festival's highlight was the Bon Odori, and the November festival consisted of many plays in foreign languages.

== Transportation ==
Prior to its relocation to the current University of Osaka Minoh Campus, the OUFS campus was located in the northern suburb of the Ao-Madani area in Minoh City, Osaka Prefecture. The OUFS campus was served by a commuter bus run by Hankyu Railways departing from Senri-Chuo Station via Kita-Senri Station to the dedicated bus stop (Osaka Gaidai Mae stop) inside the OUFS campus requiring 40 minutes.

== Notable alumni ==
- Ryotaro Shiba (author, alumni of Osaka School of Foreign Languages)
- Chin Shunshin/Chen Shunchen (author, alumni of Osaka School of Foreign Affairs)
