= Lani Misalucha =

Filipina singer and television personality

Lani Bayot Misalucha
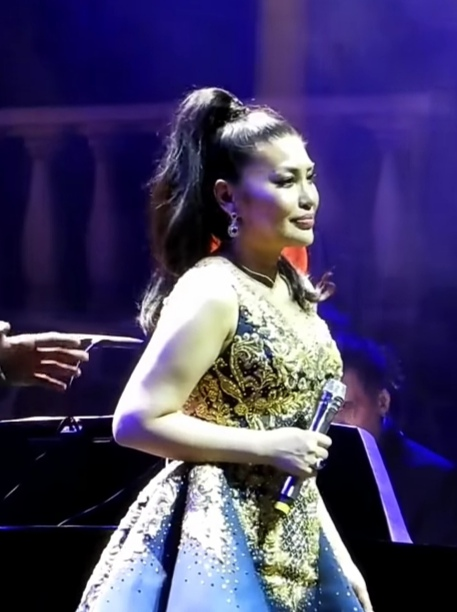
- Misalucha in 2019
- Born: Lani Dimalanta Bayot; August 3, 1969 (age 57); Manila, Philippines
- Occupations: Singer; television personality
- Spouse: Noli Misalucha
- Children: 2
- Awards: Full list
- Musical career
- Genres: OPM; jazz; classical
- Instrument: Vocals
- Years active: 1996–present
- Labels: Alpha; Viva; Universal Records; Star Music
- Website: lanimisalucha.com

Lani Bayot Misalucha (Tagalog: [ˈlanɪ ˈbɐjɔt mɪsɐˈlutʃa]; born Lani Dimalanta Bayot, August 3, 1969) is a Filipina singer. She is known for her ability to sing opera arias, and was given the name "Asia's Nightingale" by MTV Southeast Asia. Her accolades include seven Aliw and Awit Awards each, four PMPC Star Awards for Music, and two Box Office Entertainment Awards. In 2019, she was included as one of the "People of the Year" by People Asia.

Misalucha began her singing career in a church choir and as a backing vocalist for various bands. After working on commercial jingles and multiplex tapes, she released her debut album, More Than I Should, in 1997 under Alpha Records. The following year, she competed at the 3rd Asia Song Festival and won Best Interpreter for the song "Handle with Care". The same year, she signed with Viva Records and released her second album, Tunay Na Mahal (1998). In 1999, she won the top honor at the Metropop Song Festival. The next year, Misalucha released her third studio album, All Heart (2000).

In 2001, she staged her first major solo concert, "Lani Misalucha: The Crossover Live Tour" at the Araneta Coliseum, earning an "Entertainer of the Year" win at the 2002 Aliw Awards. She relocated to Las Vegas in 2004. She was the first Asian artist to headline in a main showroom in Las Vegas. Her vocal performances have earned praise from American musicians such as Dionne Warwick, Joe Jackson, Gladys Knight, James Ingram, and Whitney Houston. Among her other PARI-certified releases are Lani Misalucha (2006), Reminisce (2008), and The Nightingale Returns (2014).

== Career ==
=== 1996–1999: Career beginnings ===
Misalucha sang "Ang Iibigin ay Ikaw" (written by Jimmy Borja), which was a finalist at the Metro Manila Popular Music Festival, and later received the Awit Award for Record of the Year. She recorded the album More Than I Should for Alpha Records, featuring a title track written by Odette Quesada in 1990. The album included her cover of Fifth Dimension’s “Somebody Warm Like Me” and received 12 Katha Award nominations in 1997. The following year, she won the Minuro Endo Best Interpreter/Singer Award at the 3rd Asian Song Festival. Her song "Handle with Care" (written by Gideon Jungee Marcelo) won silver in the Best Original Song category. In 1998, Misalucha moved to Viva Records, and her album, with the carrier single "Tunay na Mahal" (written by Freddie Saturno), made the charts and turned gold, later receiving the Awit Award for Best Ballad Recording, Awit Award for Best Performance by a Female Recording Artist, and Katha Award for Best Female Pop Vocal Performance. Her cover of the 1966 song "You Don't Have To Say You Love Me" topped the Philippine charts in the same year. Misalucha's interpretation of "Can't Stop Loving You" (written by Dodjie Simon) won her the Grand Prize at the 1999 Metropop Song Festival. She was tapped to play the lead role of Sita in the S.K. Productions musical play entitled Rama at Sita. In 1999, Misalucha also received the Artist of the Year Award, Aliw Award for Best Lounge Act, Awit Award for Best Performance by a Female Recording Artist, and Awit Award Nomination for Best Stage Actress.

=== 2000–2009: All Heart, Loving You and Las Vegas shows ===
In 2000, Misalucha released the album All Heart, a collection of love songs with the carrier single "One More Time" (written by Simon). The album also included songs written by some of the Philippines' contemporary composers, such as Vehnee Saturno ("Ang Lahat Ng Ito Ay Para Sa Iyo"), Jimmy Borja ("Bukas Na Lang Kita Mamahalin"), and Trina Belamide ("Save This Heart"). She became a semi-regular host in the Sunday noontime show SOP (Sobrang Okey Pare) in 2001. Her first major solo concert in September 2001 at the Araneta Coliseum was entitled "Lani Misalucha, The Crossover Live Tour" and was repeated at the Cultural Center of the Philippines. These concerts received the Aliw Award for Best Major Concert by a Female Artist and the Tinig Award for Best Solo Performer. Her Crossover Live Concert album received the Platinum Award. In 2002, Misalucha continued to hold concerts in Cebu City, Bacolod, Baguio, Clark (Angeles City), and Davao City, as well as at OnStage Greenbelt, Makati. Misalucha then held a U.S. concert tour, performing in Reno, San Diego, Washington, Las Vegas, New York City, Chicago, Atlantic City, Pasadena, Los Angeles, and San Francisco. Mayor Willie L. Brown Jr. of San Francisco declared August 17 "Lani Misalucha Day". Misalucha received the Aliw Award for Best Female Performance in Music Lounges, Bars, Clubs & Restaurants from 1999 to 2002. In 2002, she received Aliw "Entertainer of the Year". In addition, she won two Katha awards—Best Folk Song Vocal Performance and Best Traditional Song Vocal Performance for "Kasal Sa Kaluluwa" (2002).{{Citation needed}}

Misalucha released her fourth studio album, entitled Loving You, in June 2003 with the singles "Tila" (written by Liza Diy) and "Malaya Ka Na" (written by Jimmy Antiporda). In November of the same year, she began a TV show entitled Celebrity Turns with actor-comedian Michael V. In 2004, Misalucha began increasingly focusing on family matters when her family relocated to the United States. Misalucha became the first Asian person to headline in a Main Showroom of the Las Vegas Strip, performing with Hawaii's premiere showband Society of Seven at the Jubilee Theatre of Bally's Hotel and Casino. Her stint at Bally's ran for 15 months from August 7, 2004, to February 5, 2006, after which she and the Society of Seven moved to the Main Showroom of the Flamingo from August 2006 to April 13, 2008.

In October 2006, Lani went back to the recording studio, doing covers of classics for a self-titled album, her fifth release. Lani returned to Philippines and held a live concert in Araneta Coliseum on March 17, 2007. The concert, titled Missing You, was attended by approximately 18,000 concertgoers. Misalucha re-appeared a few times on Philippine television starting on February 17, 2007, in the Sunday afternoon show ASAP of ABS-CBN (The Filipino Channel). At the end of May 2007, record label Viva re-released "Lani Misalucha Live Vol. 1 and 2". The two-volume recording contains previously released material mostly from her Crossover Live Tour albums, with various live performances from different albums within the Viva catalogue where she had appeared.

By 2008, Lani was back in Vegas. At the 20th Awit Awards, her rendition of "I Live For Your Love" received Best Performance by a Female Recording Artist. In November 2008, Universal Records released a Christmas CD titled The Gift of Christmas. The album comes with a Bonus CD featuring the Minus-One of the entire album. In 2009, Lani starred in a show named "Voices", with Earl Turner at the Las Vegas Hilton. Misalucha was the voice behind the version of Gary Valenciano's "Natutulog Ba Ang Diyos?" theme song of the ABS-CBN television soap opera that goes by the same title.

=== 2010–present ===
In October 2011, Misalucha debuted as the lead host of the first mainstream travel and lifestyle television show featuring Las Vegas, ''It's Vegas with Lani.'' Lani's popularity in Vegas led Mayor Oscar Goodman to declare December 4 as Lani Misalucha Day, following the footsteps of Mayor Willie L. Brown who had also previously declared August 17 as Lani Misalucha Day for San Francisco.

=== 2020 ===
In 2020, Misalucha contracted bacterial meningitis and lost 90% of her hearing.

== Artistry ==
=== Influences ===
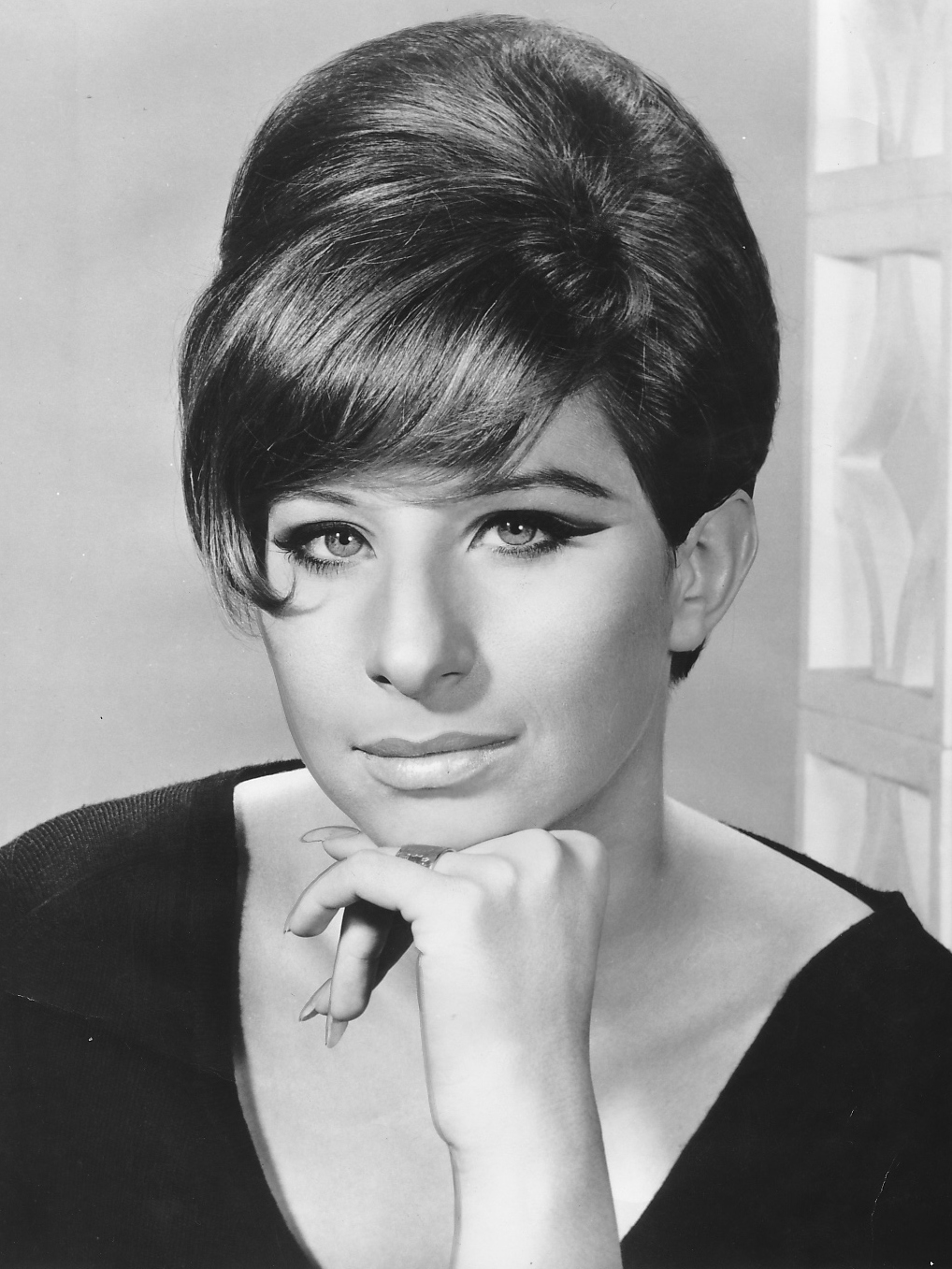
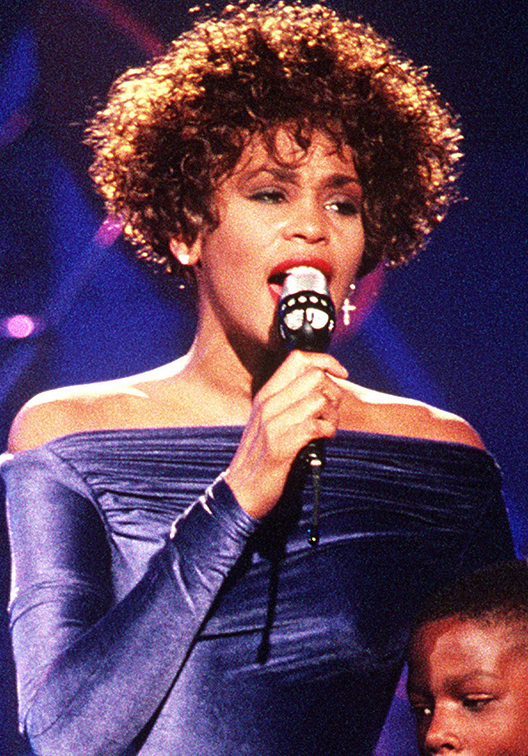
Misalucha cites Barbra Streisand (left) and Whitney Houston (right) as her musical influences since childhood.

From childhood, Misalucha was influenced by Barbra Streisand and cites idols such as Whitney Houston and Shirley Bassey. In a 2001 interview with journalist Ricky Lo, she revealed her favorite Streisand song, "As If We Never Said Goodbye" and Houston song, "Saving All My Love for You", which she used as her piece in a number of amateur singing competitions. Born into a musical family, she was involved with music at age 5 and described in a 2014 interview that "Ave Maria" was the first classical song her father taught her.

=== Voice and musical style ===
Misalucha has been described as a "vocal virtuoso" by critics and is said to be one of the best Filipino singers of all time,noted for her vocal range, vocal dexterity, showmanship and musical versatility. NYC correspondent Oliver Oliveros reported, "Lani is a seasoned recording artist who is able to scale five octaves and could sing anything in any vocal style". Misalucha's vocal performances incorporate a wide variety of genres such pop, rock, R&B, jazz, soul, Latin pop, disco, Christmas and classical music.

=== Legacy ===
MTV Southeast Asia named Misalucha as the "Asia's Nightingale" for her vocal talent. A significant figure in Philippine pop music, she has been cited and acknowledged by numerous artists as an influence and inspiration including Morissette, Zephanie Dimaranan, Stephanie Reese, Jade Riccio, Rose Marielle Mamaclay, and Ramiele Malubay. Her music has also been recorded and performed by a variety of artists such as Jake Zyrus, Julie Ann San Jose, Angeline Quinto, Klarisse de Guzman, Jed Madela, and Sarah Geronimo.

== Awards and achievements ==
Throughout her career, Misalucha has earned numerous accolades and honors. She has won seven Awit Awards, seven Aliw Awards, four PMPC Star Awards for Music, and two Box Office Entertainment Awards. Her early performances have won the top prizes in music competitions such as Musika Manila International Songwriting Competition (1997), Asia Song Festival (1998), and Metropop Song Festival (1999). The Outstanding Filipinos in America (TOFA) Awards listed her among the '100 Most Influential Filipinos in America' and she was awarded 'People of the Year' by the People Asia in 2021. She tied with Regine Velasquez as 2015's "Female Concert Performer of the Year" for her concert La Nightingale (2014) in two award-giving bodies: PMPC Star Awards for Music and Box Office Entertainment Awards. In 2008, she was awarded Best Singer at the 27th Best of Las Vegas Awards.

Misalucha is an inductee at the Eastwood City Walk of Fame. In 2014, Spotify named Misalucha as the 10th most streamed OPM artist on the platform. She has performed for the former President of Singapore S. R. Nathan, the King of Malaysia, and Sultan of Brunei. She was chosen as one of the performers at the 2017 ASEAN Gala and the 2019 South East Asian (SEA) Games. Misalucha has also performed with international artists such as Andrea Bocelli, Brian McKnight, Josh Groban, Stephen Bishop, Sergio Mendes, Kenny Loggins and Jim Brickman. Her vocal performances have also earned praises from Whitney Houston, Dionne Warwick, Joe Jackson, Gladys Knight and Mike Tyson. She has been referred to as the "Siren of the Strip" in the media for her concert residencies in Las Vegas, receiving recognition from former Governor of Nevada Kenny Guinn and former Mayor of Los Angeles James Hahn. Two former Mayors Oscar Goodman (Las Vegas) and Willie Brown (Los Angeles) proclaimed December 4 and August 17 as the "Lani Misalucha Day" in their respective cities.

== Other activities ==
=== Philanthropy ===
Misalucha has been involved with charitable organizations and benefit concerts throughout her career. In 2013, she headlined a one-off concert at the Grand Ballroom of Solaire Resort & Casino. The proceeds were donated to the victims of Typhoon Yolanda. In 2015, she donated the proceeds of her concert at The Town Hall in New York City to ABS-CBN's Bantay Bata foundation and Filipino-American Community Development Center of Ocean County, Inc (FCDC). The same year, she staged a concert in Bacolod at the SMX Convention Center, as part of her concert tour Lani Misalucha: The Philippine Tour. The proceeds were donated to the Holy Infant Nursery Foundation, Inc., supported by the Philippine Pediatric Society (PPS) Bacolod Chapter.

== Personal life ==
Lani Misalucha was born into a musical family. Her father, Benjamin de Guzmán Bayot, was an operatic tenor, while her mother, Esperanza Salvador Dimalanta was a coloratura soprano. Her sister May is a band vocalist; another sister, Karlyn, is an actress (Munting Paraiso) who also plays the violin and flute, while their brothers Novi and Osi play the guitar and piano. She was tutored in classical vocals by her parents.

Misalucha acquired her basic education from Rafael Palma Elementary School and PCU Union High School. At age 20, she sang with the Andres Bonifacio Choir of the Cultural Center of the Philippines. She eventually joined various bands as a vocalist or back-up singer, beginning with the group "Prelude" and later the group "Law of Gravity" whose bandleader, Bodjie Dasig, gave Misalucha her first single, entitled "More than I Should" (1993). She also recorded Dasig's ballad "Sakayan ng Jeep". Misalucha later worked the lounge circuits as a soloist and lent her voice to numerous commercial jingles and karaoke tapes, thus earning her the epithet, "Multiplex Queen".

After Misalucha obtained her degree in Business Management from the Philippine Christian University, she married Noli Misalucha. They have two daughters together, Lian and Louven.

Misalucha is a member of a group for the benefit of Hurricane Katrina victims in New Orleans. She is also a member of the Church of Jesus Christ of Latter-day Saints.

=== Health ===
In an interview with GMA Network on January 5, 2008, Misalucha stated that she was set to undergo surgery on an ovarian cyst (2.5 cm. now enlarged to 7.1 cm.) by February 2008.

In October 2020, Misalucha and her husband contracted and later recovered from bacterial meningitis. However, they both became completely deaf in their right ears.

== Discography ==
Studio albums

- More Than I Should (1997)
- Tunay Na Mahal (1998)
- All Heart (2000)
- Loving You (2003)
- Lani Misalucha (2006)
- Reminisce (2008)
- The Gift of Christmas (2008)
- The Nightingale Returns (2014)

== Television appearances and acting credits ==
=== Theatre ===
Year	Production	Role	Venue	Category	Ref.
1999	Rama at Sita	Sita	UP Diliman Theater	Musical	

=== Television ===
Year	Title	Role	Ref.
2000–06	SOP	Herself/Host/Performer	
2007	Your Song	Performer	
2010	5 Star Specials	Herself	
2010	P.O.5	Herself/Performer	
2010	Talentadong Pinoy	Herself/Judge/Performer	
2012	Sarah G. Live	Herself/Special guest/Performer	
2012	The X Factor Philippines	Herself/Performer	
2012	Gandang Gabi, Vice!	Herself/Guest	
2013	The Ryza Mae Show	Herself/Guest	
2013–14	The Dr. Tes Show	Herself/Guest	
2014	Banana Split	Herself/Guest	
2014	Tonight with Arnold Clavio	Herself/Guest	
2014	It's Vegas with Lani	Herself/Host/Executive Producer	
2014	It's Showtime	Herself/Guest Judge/Performer	
2016	I Love OPM	Herself/Judge	
2016	Superstar Duets	Herself/Performer	
2016	Tunay na Buhay	Herself/Guest	
2016	Celebrity Bluff	Herself/Guest	
2016–18	Sunday PinaSaya	Herself/Performer	
2017	I Can See Your Voice	Herself/Guest performer	
2018–present	The Clash	Herself/Judge	
2019	Studio 7	Herself/Guest	
2019–23	Sarap, 'Di Ba?	Herself/Guest	
2020	Sunday Noontime Live!	Herself/Host/Performer	
2021–22	All-Out Sundays	Herself/Performer	
2023	TiktoClock	Herself/Guest	
2023	Family Feud Philippines	Herself/Guest	
2023	Fast Talk with Boy Abunda	Herself/Guest	
2023	Magpakailanman	Herself/Guest	
2025	It's Showtime	Herself/Guest	
2025	Eat Bulaga!	Herself/Guest	
2025	Beyond 75: The GMA 75th Anniversary Special	Herself/Performer	

== See also ==
- List of Filipino singers
- List of Filipino actresses
- Music of the Philippines
- Philippine Association of the Record Industry
