= Inside My Heart =

Studio album by Frencheska Farr
- Released: December 8, 2010
- Recorded: 2010
- Genre: Pop; OPM
- Length: CD, 0:39:49
- Language: English, Tagalog
- Label: GMA Records
- Producer: Felipe S. Yalung (EVP and COO); Buddy Medina (Executive Producer); Kedy Sanchez (Producer); Rene A. Salta (Managing Director)

Frencheska Farr chronology
Frencheska & Geoff (2009)	Inside My Heart (2010)

Singles from Inside My Heart
- 1. "Today I'll See The Sun" Released: December 2010; 2. "Sa Pangarap Ko" Released: January 2011; 3. "Isama Mo Ako" Released: February 2011; 4. "Inside My Heart" Released: July 2012

Inside My Heart is the first solo debut album of singer/actress/model and Are You the Next Big Star? female winner Frencheska Farr. This 10-track album was produced and released by GMA Records on December 8, 2010.

== Background ==
Inside My Heart contains 10 which composed of three OPM original and three revival tracks. It is Frencheska's first album under GMA Records and was released on December 8, 2010. "Her debut album with GMA Records, Frencheska & Geoff, was awarded platinum. At such a young age, Frencheska is being recognized as one of the movers of the music industry and it's a privilege for GMA Records to produce another winner for her."

== Singles ==
Today I'll See the Sun debuted December 12, 2010 music video debuted on the same day. Isama Mo Ako debuted last February during Temptation of Wife's airtime, also the theme song from Captain Barbell (2011). Also includes Sa Pangarap Ko was the theme song from Alakdana, in which stars by Louise delos Reyes, Paulo Avelino, Ritchie Paul Gutierrez and Alden Richards.

== Other songs ==
Inside My Heart was released as a single and an official soundtrack and to promote the 2012 GMA's Korean drama primetime block, Moon Embracing the Sun.

== Credits ==
- Produced by Kedy Sanchez
- Executive Producer: Buddy C. Medina
- In Charge of Marketing: Rene A. Salta
- A&R Supervision: Kedy Sanchez
- Production Coordination: Louella Tiongson

Recorded and mixed at

- GMA Network Recording Studios
  - Sound Engineer: Oyet San Diego
  - Additional Engineering: Edwin Dimaano, Archie Gaba

== Track listing ==
No.	Title	Writer(s)	Arranger(s)	Length
1.	"Everytime"	Rebel Magdagasang	Niño Regalado	3:54
2.	"Sa Pangarap Ko"	Vehnee Saturno	Arnold Buena	4:02
3.	"Today I'll See The Sun"	Rebel Magdagasang	Niño Regalado	3:48
4.	"This Feeling"	Popsie Saturno - San Pedro	Marc Santos	3:31
5.	"Isama Mo Ako"	Vehnee Saturno	Arnold Buena	4:13
6.	"Suddenly It's Magic"	Amy Sue Reichardt, Willie Wilcox	Paulo Zarate	4:27
7.	"Ang Pag-ibig Kong Ito"	Carlos Agawa, Ernie dela Peña	Paulo Zarate	3:44
8.	"I Still Haven't Found What I'm Looking For"	Bono, U2	Paulo Zarate	4:06
9.	"Bakit Ikaw"	Agatha Obar	Melvin Morallos	3:56
10.	"Inside My Heart"	Agatha Obar	Melvin Morallos	4:08
Total length:				39:49

- track 1 - "Everytime" was originally by Maoui David.
- track 3 - "Today I'll See The Sun" was originally recorded by Karel Marquez.
- track 6 - "Suddenly It's Magic" is a 1987 original of Vesta Williams and used as a theme song from My Valentine Girls.
- track 7 - "Ang Pag-ibig Kong Ito" was originally recorded by Leah Navarro and is the theme song of the 2010 GMA's Korean drama, Temptation of Wife.
- track 8 - "I Still Haven't Found (What I'm Looking For)" was originally recorded by U2.

== Certifications ==
Country	Provider	Certification	Sales
Philippines	PARI	Double Platinum	PHL sales: 25,000
