= Overtime (film) =

- Official movie poster from GMA Films
- Directed by: Wincy Aquino Ong; Earl Ignacio
- Screenplay by: Wincy Aquino Ong
- Story by: Wincy Aquino Ong
- Produced by: Jose Mari Abacan; Annette Gozon-Abrogar
- Starring: Richard Gutierrez; Lauren Young
- Cinematography: Mycko David
- Edited by: Wincy Aquino Ong; Glenn Carbon
- Music by: Mikoy Morales; Patience Dear Juggernaut
- Production company: GMA Films
- Distributed by: GMA Films
- Release date: July 2, 2014
- Running time: 95 minutes
- Country: Philippines
- Languages: Filipino; English
- Box office: $42,172

Overtime is a 2014 Philippine suspense thriller film directed by Wincy Aquino Ong, who also served as writer and co-editor, and Earl Ignacio. The film stars Richard Gutierrez and Lauren Young.

== Synopsis ==
Tasked by a terrorist to wear a bomb to a press conference, a woman must use her wits to avert this act and save her abducted brother.

== Cast ==
- Richard Gutierrez as Dom Garcia
- Lauren Young as Jody Amistoso
- Roi Vinzon as Vicente Alonzo
- Mitch Valdez as Lola Vi
- Bearwin Meily as Raffy San Diego
- Roadfill as Bhoy Tinapay
- Renz Valerio as Brian Amistoso
- William Martinez as Jody's Father
- Yayo Aguila as Jody's Mother
- Edwin Reyes as Police Chief
- Ruby Ruiz as Officemate
- Frencheska Farr as SPO2 Montoya
- Adrian Ramirez as Janitor
- Dreps Tatad as Reporter
- Earl Ignacio as Guard
- Wincy Aquino Ong as Angry Driver
