= Us-2 Evil-0 =

- Origin: Manila, Philippines
- Genres: Indie pop
- Years active: 2007–2012, 2020–present
- Labels: PolyEast Records; MCA Music; Island Records Philippines
- Members: Quark Henares; Mich Dulce; Wincy Aquino Ong; Nix Puno; Bogs Jugo

Us-2 Evil-0 is an indie pop band based in Manila, Philippines. According to a review, "Us-2 Evil-0 makes catchy indie pop music that is backed by boy-girl harmony vocals and Casiotone swells." They released their debut album, Dirty Debutantes, in 2009 on PolyEast Records.

== History ==
=== Founding ===
Us-2 Evil-0's members have long been habitués of the local music scene. Henares occasionally sang with Ciudad (who were his high school classmates), and even recorded lead vocals on a few songs over their first three albums. He also sings for anti-show band Blast Ople. Mich Dulce may be familiar to the average person as a fashion designer and former Pinoy Big Brother housemate, though she's been in the music scene for years. She recorded an entire album as the singer of Candyaudioline that never saw release. She was the vocalist of semi-riot grrl indie rock band Death By Tampon, which saw dissolution before they could release a proper album (a single made it to airwaves, though).Bassist Nix Puno has played with Twisted Halo. Drummer Bogs Jugo came from Pupil and Daydream Cycle. Wincy Aquino Ong was a member of the first iteration of Narda, and also has a solo career as Patience Dear Juggernaut.

=== Debut album ===
The album Dirty Debutantes was produced by Mikey Amistoso of Ciudad. The album contains 11 tracks. It was released independently in 2009, with a video for the track "This Might Heart Attack" released that October on MYX and MTV. It was later distributed by PolyEast Records.

=== "This Mighty Heart Attack" Music Video ===
The music video for "This Mighty Heart Attack" was directed by cinematographer and director JA Tadeña. It was featured in Spot.ph's list of Top 10 Music Videos that Showcase Manila, as the video featured locations such as the city's trains, buses and underpasses.

=== Greenwich Commercial ===
Their song "This Mighty Heart Attack" was used for a commercial for Greenwich Pizza, which starred actress Anne Curtis.

=== Touring In Asia ===
Us-2 Evil-0 had toured in Hong Kong in 2009 for The Fifth Anniversary of Underground HK and in Singapore in 2010 for Rockin' The Region.

== Members ==
- Quark Henares - vocals
- Mich Dulce - vocals
- Wincy Aquino Ong - guitars & keyboards
- Nix Puno - bass
- Bogs Jugo - drummer

=== Guest members ===
- Saab Magalona
- Glaiza de Castro
- Selena Salang

== Discography ==
=== Albums ===
- 2009: Dirty Debutantes (PolyEast Records)

=== EPs ===
- 2020: Filthy Finishers (Island Records Philippines/MCA Music)

=== Singles ===
- 2009: "This Mighty Heart Attack"
- 2009: "Our Weekends Dissolve"
- 2010: "Mixtape"
- 2020: "Karaoke Machine"
- 2020: "Semper Fi"
