= Stupid Is Forever =

Book by Miriam Defensor Santiago

Stupid is Forever
- First edition
- Author: Miriam Defensor Santiago
- Cover artist: Cj de Silva-Ong
- Language: English; Tagalog
- Subject: Irony; Pick-up line; Witticism/Wisecrack
- Genre: Humor Speech
- Publisher: ABS-CBN Publishing
- Publication date: 2014
- Publication place: Philippines
- Media type: Print (Paperback)
- Pages: 132
- ISBN: 978-971-816-127-2
- OCLC: 904801397
- Followed by: Stupid is Forevermore

Stupid is Forever is a 2014 comedy book by former Senator Miriam Defensor Santiago, published by ABS-CBN Publishing.

== Overview ==
Stupid is Forever is composed of Santiago's one-line jokes, comebacks, and pick-up lines which she delivers in her speeches on topics like the pork barrel scandal, former Vice President Jejomar Binay, and the state of governance in the Philippines.

The book also features illustrations from Cj de Silva-Ong, Manix Abrera, Elbert Or, and Rob Cham.

== Release and sales ==
The book has sold over 110,000 copies since its launch in December 2014, making it the country's fastest best-selling book of 2014.

== Reception ==
The Philippine Daily Inquirer called the book the "essential Miriam Defensor Santiago, and it sold out as quickly as she could fire punch lines."

== Sequel ==
A sequel titled Stupid is Forevermore, also published by ABS-CBN Publishing, was released a year later on her 70th birthday in 2015. The use of the word Forevermore was taken from an ABS-CBN romantic drama series of the same name.
