= BandaOke! Rock 'N Roll to Millions =

Philippine television game show

- Title card
- Genre: Game show
- Directed by: Rico Gutierrez
- Presented by: Jaya; Allan K.
- Country of origin: Philippines
- Original language: Tagalog
- No. of episodes: 22

Production
- Executive producer: Wilma Galvante
- Camera setup: Multiple-camera setup
- Running time: 45–60 minutes
- Production company: GMA Entertainment TV

Original release
- Network: GMA Network
- Release: October 25, 2009 – March 21, 2010

BandaOke! Rock 'N Roll to Millions is a Philippine television game show by GMA Network. Hosted by Jaya and Allan K., it premiered on October 25, 2009. The show concluded on March 21, 2010, with a total of 22 episodes.

== Cast ==
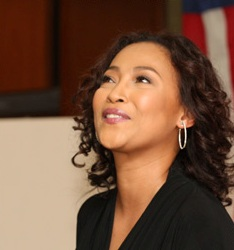
Jaya served as a host.

Hosts

- Jaya
- Allan K.

Band

- Frencheska Farr
- Geoff Taylor
- Jay Perillo
- Tim Mallilin - bass
- Weckl Mercado - lead guitar
- Michael Gemina - drums
- Ivan Espinosa - piano
- Iean Iñigo - 2nd keyboard

== Ratings ==
According to AGB Nielsen Philippines' Mega Manila household television ratings, the pilot episode of BandaOke earned a 19.2% rating. The final episode scored a 13% rating.
