= Rakista =

- Genre: Comedy; Musical
- Created by: Quark Henares; Diego Castillo
- Developed by: MPB Primedia, Inc.
- Written by: Quark Henares
- Directed by: Quark Henares; Mihk Vergara
- Starring: Carlo Aquino; Charles Christianson; Denise Laurel; Alcris Galura; Rhea Nakpil; Marco Morales; Wincy Aquino Ong; Jewelyn Block
- Country of origin: Philippines
- Original language: Filipino
- No. of episodes: 15

Production
- Executive producers: Mads Adrias; Quark Henares
- Editors: Onin Tagaro; John Bautista
- Camera setup: Multi-camera setup
- Running time: 1 hour

Original release
- Network: TV5
- Release: August 14 – November 20, 2008

Rakista is a Philippie television situational comedy series broadcast by TV5. Directed by Quark Henares and Mihk Vergara, it stars Carlo Aquino, Charles Christianson, Denise Laurel, Alcris Galura, Rhea Nakpil, Marco Morales, Wincy Aquino Ong and Jewelyn Block. It aired from August 14, 2008, to November 20, 2008, replacing PBA Classics and was replaced by Rescue Mission. It was among the new shows unveiled by the network (formerly known as ABC) upon its relaunch on August 9, 2008.

Rakista TV Series was created by filmmaker Quark Henares and Diego Castillo, co-founder and guitarist of the rock band Sandwich. Apart from Henares and Castillo, writers for the show have included music video director King Palisoc, Palanca Award-winning author Yvette Tan and The Philippine Star columnist Erwin Romulo. Each episode also features a narration by poet and vocalist for Radioactive Sago Project Lourd de Veyra. Mikey Amistoso of Ciudad (band) and Diego Mapa of Cambio are credited with the original music for the series.

== Synopsis ==
Rakista features a behind-the-scenes look at the on-campus and off-campus adventures of a struggling newly formed rock band named The Love Team. Its soundtrack is rock music-intensive, showcasing compositions from many Filipino bands. The story starts when Caloy (Carlo Aquino) practices his guitar and his brother, also a musician but a frustrated one, but no longer following his dream and told Caloy to do what his heart follows but make priorities first.

== Cast ==
Actor	Character
Carlo Aquino	Caloy.
Charles Christianson	Ted
Denise Laurel	CC
Alcris Galura	Nix
Rhea Nakpil	Bebe
Marco Morales	Sonny
Wincy Ong	Sven
Bea Garcia	Rosemarie Joy
Hazel	Jewelyn
William Herrera	Alvarez
Pontri	coach

== Critical reception ==
The TV series has been lauded uniquely "Pinoy" style and for its "twisted sense of humor that has never been present in [Philippine] television." Critics have attributed as among the show's influences, Joss Whedon, John Hughes films, The Adventures of Pete and Pete, and the Michael Winterbottom film 9 Songs.
