= Langit sa Piling Mo =

2010 Philippine television drama series

- Title card
- Also known as: Heaven with You
- Genre: Romantic drama
- Created by: Senedy Que
- Directed by: Gil Tejada Jr.
- Creative director: Jun Lana
- Starring: Heart Evangelista; Mark Herras
- Theme music composer: Vehnee Saturno
- Opening theme: "Hulog ng Langit" by Frencheska Farr and Geoff Taylor
- Country of origin: Philippines
- Original language: Tagalog
- No. of episodes: 80

Production
- Executive producer: Michele Borja
- Camera setup: Multiple-camera setup
- Running time: 18–29 minutes
- Production company: GMA Entertainment TV

Original release
- Network: GMA Network
- Release: May 31 – September 17, 2010

Langit sa Piling Mo (transl. heaven in your cluster / international title: Heaven with You) is a 2010 Philippine television drama romance series broadcast by GMA Network. Directed by Gil Tejada Jr., it stars Heart Evangelista and Mark Herras. It premiered on May 31, 2010, on the network's Telebabad line up. The series concluded on September 17, 2010, with a total of 80 episodes.

The series is streaming online on YouTube.

== Cast and characters ==
Cast

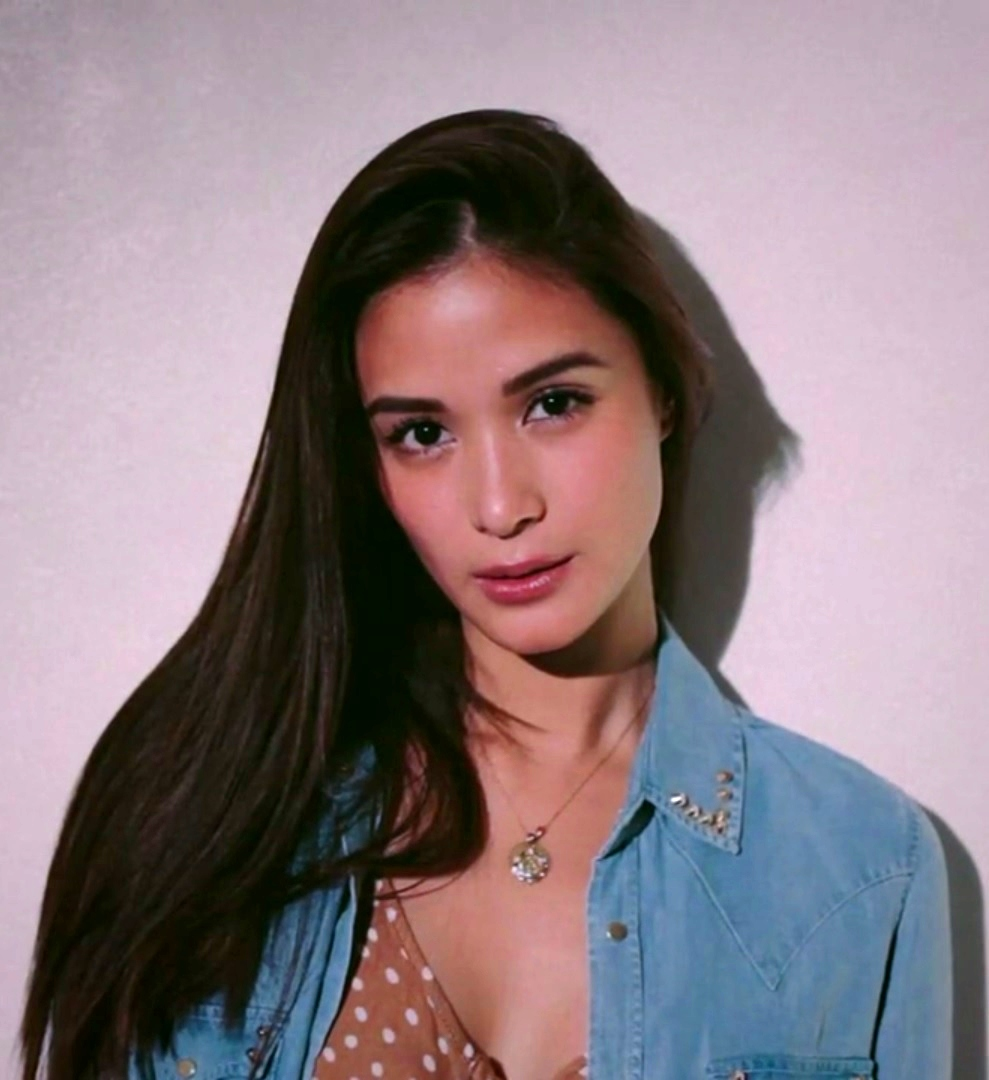
Heart Evangelista

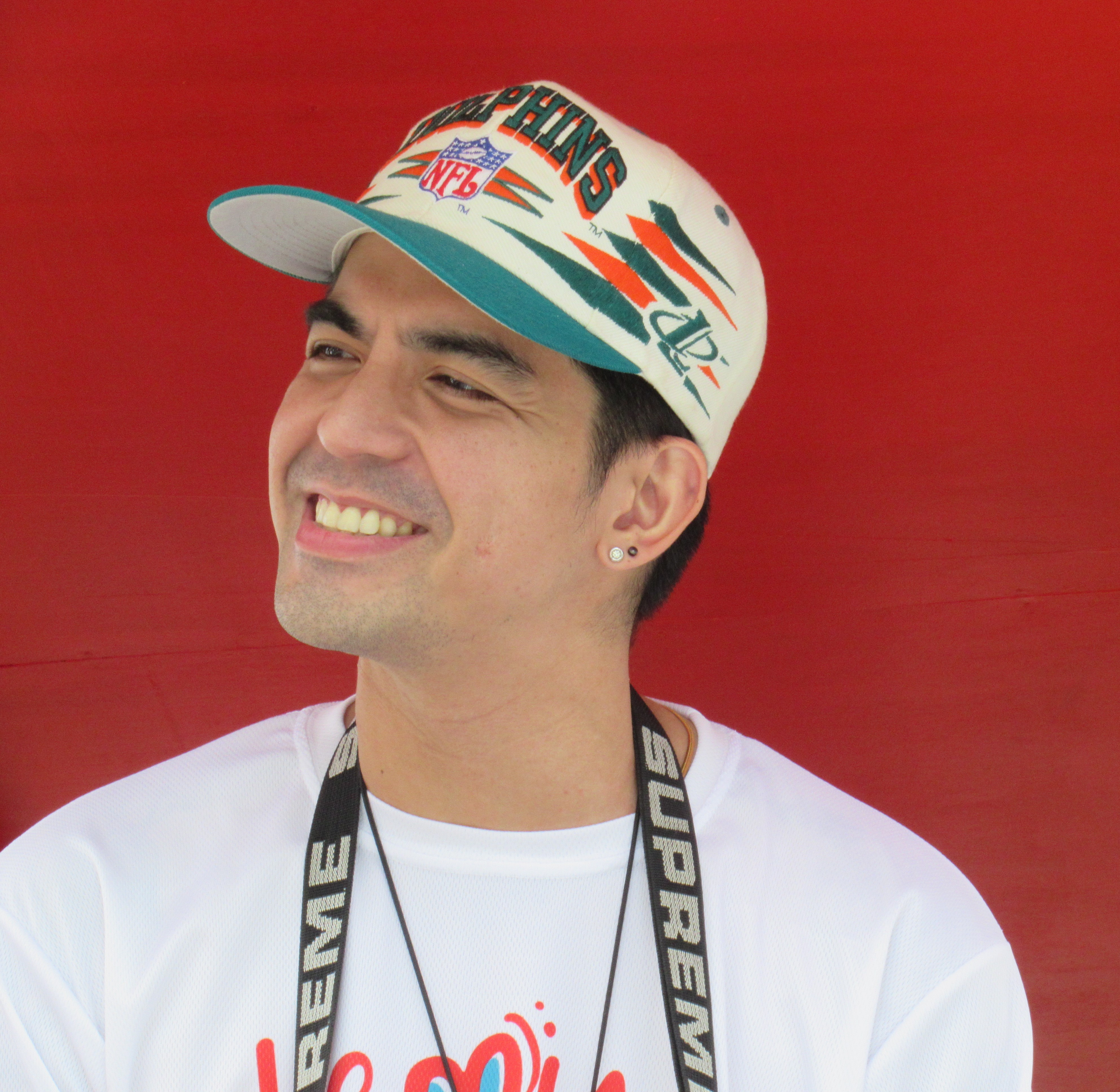
Mark Herras

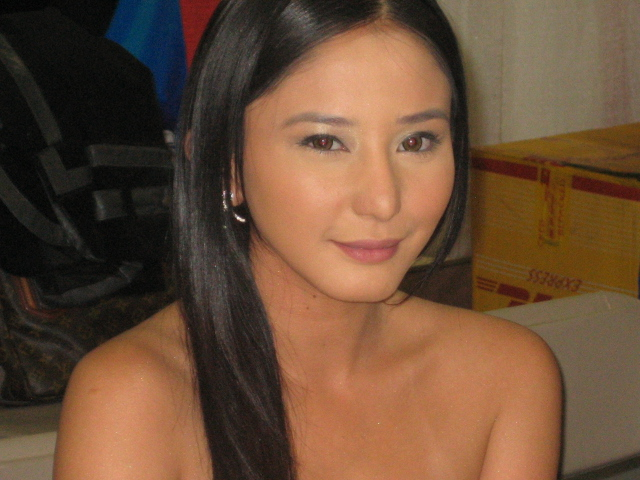
Katrina Halili

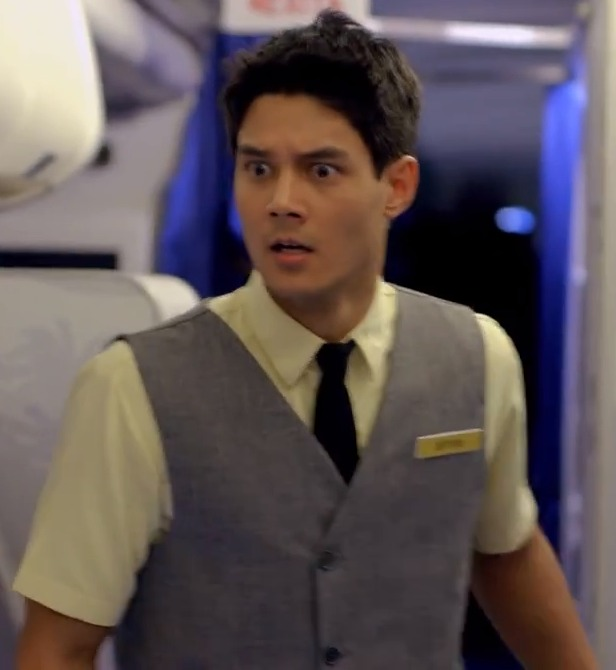
Daniel Matsunaga

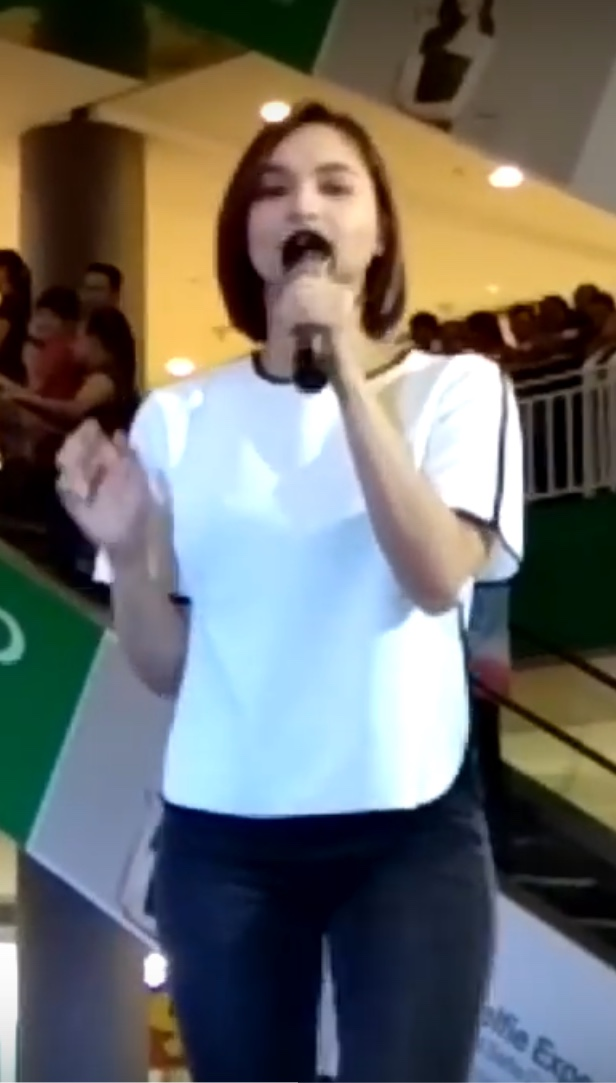
Ryza Cenon

Lead cast

- Heart Evangelista as Margarita "Marj" Rosales / Marietta Flores
- Mark Herras as Rodrigo "Rigo" Hilario III / Thirdy

Supporting cast

- JC Tiuseco as Jerry Narciso
- Daniel Matsunaga as Xavier Cruz
- Katrina Halili as Aurora Ty
- Arci Muñoz as Melanie Tecson
- Tonton Gutierrez as Stanley Ty
- Maritoni Fernandez as Gloria Hilario
- Joonee Gamboa as Rodrigo Hilario Sr.
- Sylvia Sanchez as Mely Rosales
- Jay Aquitania as Felix Flores
- Ryza Cenon as Candy / Joy Flores
- Marky Lopez as Jay de Guzman
- Say Alonzo as Pacita "Cita" Alonzo
- Joanne Quintas as Bianca Quimpo
- Evelyn Vargas as Evangeline Amparo
- Philip Lazaro as Pebbles Manalo
- Soliman Cruz as Ador Pinlac
- Carlo Gonzales as William Jimenez
- Marco Morales as Warren Tuazon

Guest cast

- Ricardo Cepeda as Rodrigo "Rod" Hilario Jr.
- Sheryl Cruz as Alma Flores
- Rey "PJ" Abellana as Juanito Flores
- Sheena Halili as Bernadette "Berna" Soriano
- Dex Quindoza as King
- Stef Prescott as Jenny / fake Joy
- Sandy Talag as younger Marietta
- Miguel Tanfelix as younger Thirdy
- Ella Guevara as younger Aurora
- Elijah Magundayao as younger Felix
- Mikaela Dimaculangan as younger Joy
- Hansen Nichols as Frank Salas
- Jen Rosendahl as Jennifer Salas

== Production ==
Airport scenes of the series were filmed at terminal 3 of Ninoy Aquino International Airport in Pasay, Metro Manila.

== Ratings ==
According to AGB Nielsen Philippines' Mega Manila People/Individual television ratings, the final episode scored a 9% rating.
