= Wincy Aquino Ong =

Filipino actor and director

- Born: Wincy Gerard Aquino Ong; February 4, 1982 (age 43); Manila, Philippines
- Occupations: Musician, director, writer
- Spouse(s): CJ de Silva (m. 2013; d. 2024)

Wincy Gerard Aquino Ong (born February 4, 1982) is a Filipino musician, director, actor, writer, illustrator, and podcaster. He is best known as the songwriter for the bands Narda and Us-2 Evil-0, the director behind the films San Lazaro and Overtime, and the actor who played Sven de Leon in the TV series Rakista. He is also the host of The Telebabad Tapes, with his wife CJ de Silva.

== Early life ==
Ong was born in Quezon City, the second of four children. He attended the Ateneo de Manila for grade school, high school and university. In 2004, he earned a bachelor's degree in AB Communication.

== Work ==
=== Music ===
As a musician, Ong played in college bands before starting his career as the bassist and songwriter for the band Narda from 2002 to 2005. He was nominated for NU 107 Rock Awards' Bassist of The Year category in 2003. After quitting Narda in 2005, he then composed musical scores for radio, TV and film—most notable of which are station ID music for ABS-CBN's cable channels, Lifestyle Network, Cinema One, and MYX, and for rival cable company, Solar Entertainment Corporation.

In 2007, he wrote songs for the Gawad Kalinga musical Tao Po which was staged in the Philippines and Indonesia. As a film composer, he has written music for the films Still Life, Cul de sac, Huling Pasada and Overtime.

In 2008, he formed the band Us-2 Evil-0 with director Quark Henares and fashion designer Mich Dulce. In 2010, he released his solo musical project Patience Dear Juggernaut.

=== Film ===
Ong directed music videos from 2003 until 2014. He made the video for True Faith's "Araw't Gabi". The video caught the attention of record companies and led Ong to direct and do cinematography for acts such as Pupil, Sandwich, Itchyworms, The Bloomfields, Sponge Cola, Hale, Silent Sanctuary, Cueshe, Chicosci, Sugarfree, The Camerawalls, Nikki Gil and Kyla.

His music video for Pupil's "Dulo Ng Dila" (co-directed with King Palisoc)--with its '60s-inspired production design—earned a nomination for the Music Video of the Year at the Awit Awards in 2006, which was also listed as one of the 50 Best OPM Music Videos of all time by FHM Magazine. "Chicosci Vampire Social Club"] won Favorite Rock Video at the 2006 MYX Music Awards.

Ong wrote and produced an Eraserheads documentary for the show MYXposed in 2008. In 2011, Ong produced and directed his first feature film San Lazaro for the Cinemalaya festival. It was nominated for the NETPAC Award. In 2014, Ong wrote and co-directed (with Earl Ignacio) his first mainstream film, Overtime, under GMA Films.

In 2015, Ong focused on more commercial projects, writing and producing web films for Magic Crackers and Jollibee, projects that won several awards from The Philippine Quill Awards and The Anvil Awards.

=== Acting ===
Ong started his stint in acting after being cast for a pilot for Petiks, an office-set comedy show under ABS-CBN, with Ping Medina and Toni Gonzaga. The show was not picked up, but his performance in the pilot led to other bit parts in music videos and short films.

In August 2008, he starred as the eccentric drummer Sven de Leon in the TV5 series Rakista with Carlo Aquino and Denise Laurel. He co-starred with Ramon Bautista in the horror film San Lazaro.

Ong also acted in TV commercials for ANC, Belo and Minute Maid and as a mad scientist in Sponge Cola's "Tambay" music video.

In a 2013 Spot.ph article entitled "From Music Men to Leading Men: Top 10 Rockstars-Turned-Actors", Ong was described as "a low-profile charmer...and a reliable actor".

=== Writing ===
Ong has written for publications such as The Philippine Star, Esquire, and 8list.ph.

His horror story "Marty" was published as part of Neil Gaiman's Expeditions Prose Vol. 1 / The Philippine Graphic / Fiction Awards anthology.

In 2020, he released his first collection of fiction, Tales For A Rainy Season. The horror anthology is known for its short story "The Ophthalmologist's Case", a pastiche of Sir Arthur Conan Doyle in which Sherlock Holmes meets Jose Rizal during the height of the Jack the Ripper murders.

In 2023, Ong was commissioned by the Eraserheads to write the lyrics inserts and liner notes to their Circus Limited Edition Vinyl release.

=== Podcasting ===
Ong hosts the comedy podcast Telebabad Tapes with his wife CJ de Silva, under Podcast Network Asia.

He has also hosted Worms Upon A Time: An Itchyworms Podcast, a six-part limited series that looked back on the history of the band The Itchyworms.

=== Comic books and graphic novels ===
Ong's short-form comics have appeared in three anthologies published by Komiket: “Shifts” in Darkness, “Dahil May Komiks” in Kometverse, and “Butiking Pasay: Joke Time” in Tuwa (co-published by the Vibal Foundation). He also collaborated with illustrator Ardie Aquino on Ardie & Wincy's Journey to the Centerfold, a comic book designed to be read inward from both ends, with the narrative converging at the centerfold.

In 2025, he released the opening chapter to his graphic novel at the Philippine International Comics Festival 2025, entitled Butiking Pasay: Rooftop: Boogie, a superhero story set in 1980s Manila.

== Personal life ==
In 2013, after a year of studying at the Vancouver Film School in Vancouver, British Columbia, Ong married painter and art director CJ de Silva.
