= Are You the Next Big Star? =

2009 Philippine television reality show

- Title card
- Genre: Reality competition
- Presented by: Regine Velasquez; Keempee de Leon
- Judges: Danny Tan; Pops Fernandez; Mon Faustino; Annie Quintos; Randy Santiago
- Country of origin: Philippines
- Original language: Tagalog
- No. of episodes: 16

Production
- Production locations: GMA Network Studios, Quezon City, Philippines
- Camera setup: Multiple-camera setup
- Running time: 60 minutes
- Production companies: Alta Productions Group; GMA Entertainment TV

Original release
- Network: GMA Network
- Release: May 16 – August 23, 2009

Are You the Next Big Star? is a 2009 Philippine television reality competition show broadcast by GMA Network. Hosted by Regine Velasquez and Keempee de Leon, it premiered on May 16, 2009. The show concluded on August 23, 2009, with a total of 16 episodes.

== Overview ==
The program seeks to discover the best singer in the country through a series of nationwide auditions. The public decides the outcomes of the later stages through text voting. The judges who give critiques of the contestants' performances have included Pops Fernandez, Randy Santiago, Danny Tan, Mon Faustino and Annie Quintos.

The prizes at stake includes one million pesos (P 1,000,000), a condominium unit from Avida, a management contract from GMA Artist Center and a recording contract from GMA Records. There will be two winners in the show: one male and one female.

On August 23, 2009, on the show's big finale, Frencheska Farr and Geoff Taylor were announced as the next female big star and next male big star respectively. Following the third and final round of the competition, Zyrene Parsad and Jay Perillo were eliminated. Camille Cortez and Alex Castro joined Frencheska Farr and Geoff Taylor in the final round of competition.

Frencheska Farr sang the victory song entitled Show Must Go On while Geoff Taylor sang the victory song entitled Heto Na. Both songs were composed by the show's musical director Raul Mitra and his wife Cacai Velasquez.

== Production ==
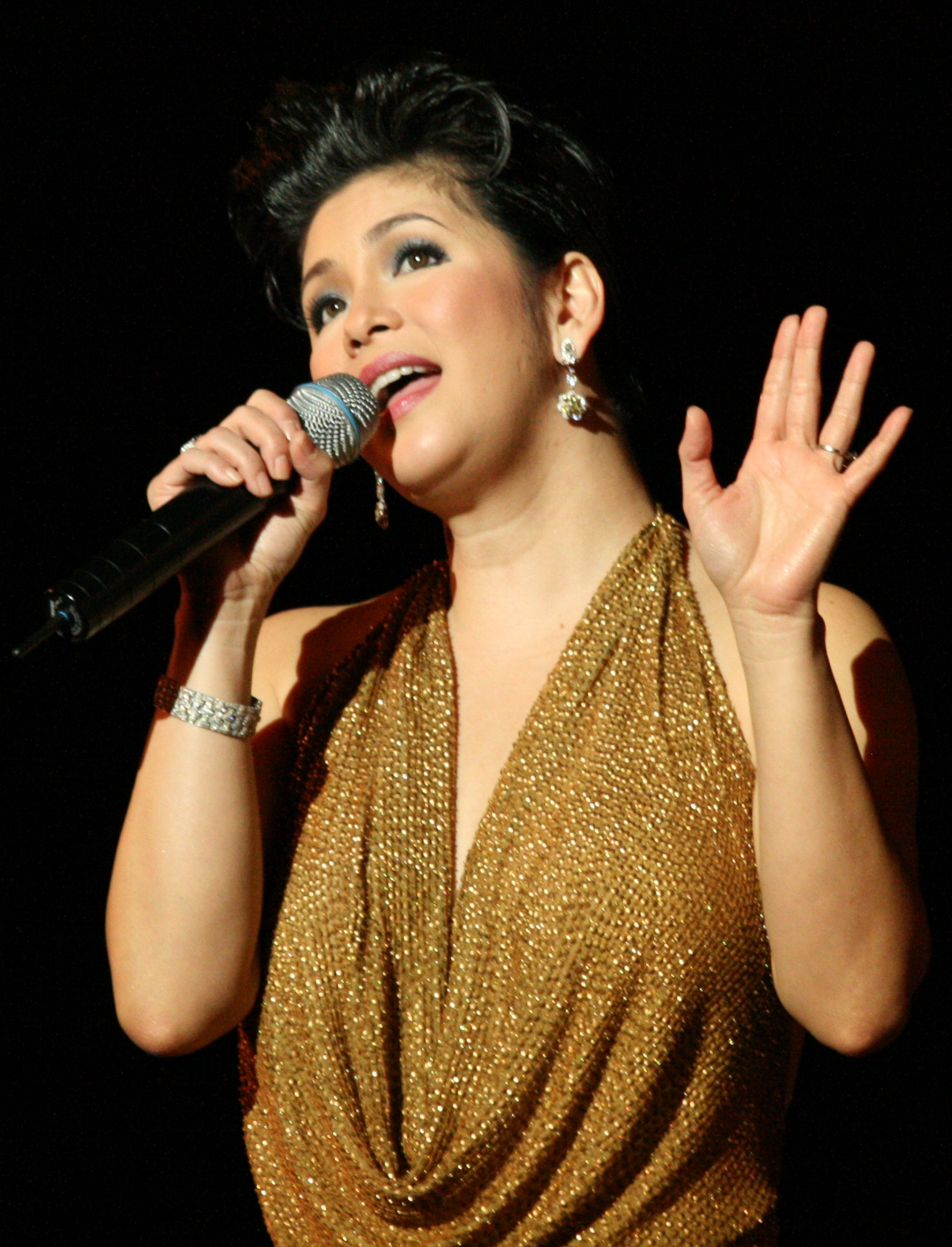
Regine Velasquez serves as the host.

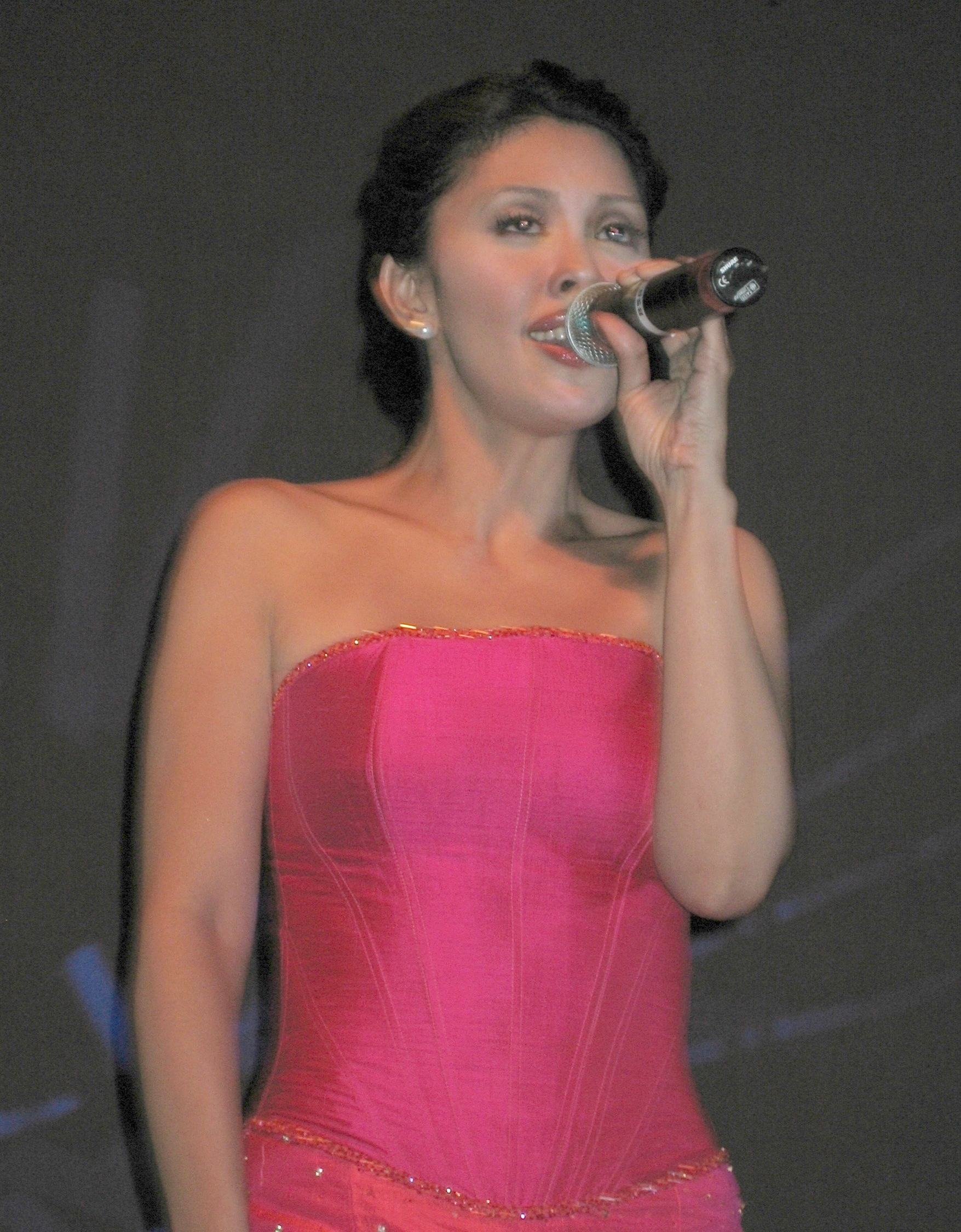
Pops Fernandez serves as a judge.

In 2008, GMA Network had broadcast the country's second version of the Idol franchise, Pinoy Idol, following ABC's Philippine Idol. Debuting to mixed reaction, GMA's senior Vice President for Entertainment Wilma Galvante had stated that GMA Network had been attempting to work with FremantleMedia to explore options on how the show could be improved to better cater to the Pinoy audience. Darling de Jesus, vice president for Music and Variety programs at GMA Network, later stated that they "wanted [the next season of Pinoy Idol] to be more Pinoy", but could not come to terms with Fremantle over their changes. It was decided that GMA Network would instead produce their own music competition, tailored to the Filipino audience. This show would be Are You The Next Big Star?

== Semi-finals ==
The top 150 had been divided into two batches. The first batch performed one by one last May 16 while the second performed last May 23. The scores where divided into two parts 80% from the judges and 20% from the jury and the top 40 contenders with the highest scores moves to the second round.

=== Top 40 ===
- Francis Zari Bilon (16 years old)
- Richard Del Pilar (22 years old)
- Zara Zaldua (17 years old)
- Jomar Del Pena (23 years old)
- Kristell Llono (16 years old)
- Anthony Calvo (20 years old)
- Patricia Gerona (16 years old)
- Justin Francis (19 years old)
- Camille Cortez (19 years old)
- Charles Bunyi (22 years old)
- Lara Bayani (16 years old)
- PJ Gonzales (18 years old)
- Frencheska Farr (16 years old)
- Noel Sandino (17 years old)
- Monique Lualhati (18 years old)
- Febz Reyes (18 years old)
- Lucky Robles (23 years old)
- Denise Concepcion (16 years old)
- Jefferson Barte (20 years old)
- VJ Caber (23 years old)
- Nikki Guevarra (22 years old)
- Geoff Taylor (22 years old)
- Shane Anja Tarun (16 years old)
- Anton Cruz (16 years old)
- Alyssa Kate Quijano (16 years old)
- Alex Castro (23 years old)
- Rachel Gabreza (16 years old)
- Marvin Ong (21 years old)
- Zyrene Parsad (23 years old)
- Loppo Maniquiz (21 years old)
- Alexa Ortega (19 years old)
- Greggy Santos (22 years old)
- Jaynell Calingo (18 years old)
- Bobby Solomon (17 years old)
- Christine Allado (16 years old)
- Aljon Palafox (16 years old)
- Thara Therese Jordana (18 years old) (withdrew)
- Miguel Orleans (22 years old)
- Cara Quiapos (16 years old)
- Jay Perillo (20 years old)

== Circle of 16 ==
The Circle of 16 was announced last June 13, 2008. This consists of 9 boys and 8 girls.

Male

- Jay Perillo (20 y/o - Tondo, Manila)
- PJ Gonzalez (18 y/o - Pasay)
- Alex Castro (23 y/o - Bulacan)
- Anton Cruz (16 y/o - Quezon City)
- Geoff Taylor (23 y/o - Cagayan Valley)
- Justin Francis (19 y/o - San Francisco, CA)
- Greggy Santos (23 y/o - Quezon City)
- Bobby Solomon (17 y/o - Pasay)

Female

- Camille Cortez (19 y/o - Antipolo)
- Alexa Ortega (19 y/o - Quezon City)
- Cara Quiapos (17 y/o - Batangas)
- Frencheska Farr (16 y/o - Las Piñas)
- Anja Shane Tarun (16 y/o - Isabela Province)
- Rachel Gabreza (16 y/o - Cebu City)
- Zyrene Parsad (23 y/o - Las Piñas)
- Christine Allado (18 y/o - Quezon City)

== Song list ==
Boys

1. Geoff Taylor

- Umbrella (Rihanna) - July 4
- Perfect (Simple Plan) - July 11
- Love Story (Andy Williams) - July 18
- Beat It (Michael Jackson) - July 25
- Broken Wings (Mr. Mister) - August 1
- Zombie (The Cranberries) - August 8
- Pride (In The Name Of Love) (U2) (performed with Jaya) - August 22^{2}
- Open Arms (Journey) (performed with Jet Pangan) - August 23^{2} (Winner)
- What About Love (Heart) (performed with Geneva Cruz) - August 23^{2} (Winner)
- Kahit Kailan (South Border) - August 23^{2} (Winner)

2. Alex Castro

- This Love (Maroon 5) - July 4
- Sabihin Mo Na (Top Suzara) - July 11
- Panakip Butas (Hajji Alejandro) - July 18
- You Are Not Alone (Michael Jackson) - July 25
- Nandito Ako (Ogie Alcasid) - August 1
- Basang-Basa Sa Ulan (Aegis) - August 8
- Narda (Kamikazee) (performed with Gian Magdangal) - August 22^{2}
- Huling El Bimbo (Eraserheads) (performed with Ogie Alcasid) - August 23^{2} (Second Place)
- I'll Be There For You (Bon Jovi) (performed with Marc Tupaz of Shamrock) - August 23^{2} (Second Place)
- Awit ng Kabataan (Rivermaya) - August 23^{2} (Second Place)

3. Jay Perillo

- Iris (Goo Goo Dolls) - July 4
- Pagsubok (After Image) - July 11
- Ngayon at Kailanman (Basil Valdez) - July 18
- She's Out of My Life (Michael Jackson) - July 25
- Boys Don't Cry (The Cure) - August 1
- Do I Make You Proud? (Taylor Hicks) - August 8
- Habang May Buhay (After Image) (with Wency Cornejo) - August 22^{2}
- Kung Ako'y Iiwan Mo (Basil Valdez) (with Basil Valdez) - August 23^{2} (Third Place)
- Alone (Heart) (with Gian Magdangal) - August 23^{2} (Third Place)

4. Greggy Santos

- Everything (Michael Bublé) - July 4
- Kailan (Eraserheads) - July 11
- Mandy (Barry Manilow) - July 18
- The Girl Is Mine (Michael Jackson) - July 25
- Beauty and Madness (Fra Lippo Lippi) - August 1
- Best I Ever Had (Vertical Horizon) - August 8^{1} (Eliminated)

5. Bobby Solomon

- This Is Me (Demi Lovato feat. Joe Jonas) - July 4
- Imagine (John Lennon) - July 11
- September (Earth, Wind and Fire) - July 18
- Billie Jean (Michael Jackson) - July 25^{1} (Eliminated)

6. PJ Gonzales

- Pangako (Kindred Garden) - July 4
- Always Be My Baby (Mariah Carey, version of David Cook) - July 11
- Nakapagtataka (Rachel Alejandro) - July 18^{1} (Eliminated)

7. Anton Cruz

- I Do (Cherish You) (98 Degrees) - July 4
- Let The Love Begin (Gino Padilla) - July 11 (Eliminated)

8. Justin Francis

- Superstition (Stevie Wonder) - July 4 (Eliminated)

Girls

1. Frencheska Farr

- Bukas Na Lang Kita Mamahalin (Lani Misalucha) - July 4
- Please Don't Stop The Music (Rihanna) - July 11
- Bridges (Kevyn Lettau) - July 18
- One Day In Your Life (Michael Jackson) - July 25
- These Dreams (Heart) - August 1
- Candyman (Christina Aguilera) - August 8
- Fighter (Christina Aguilera) (performed with Rachelle Ann Go) - August 15^{2}
- I Finally Found Someone (Barbra Streisand and Bryan Adams) (performed with Joey G. of Side A) - August 23^{2} (Winner)
- Because of You (Kelly Clarkson) (performed with Kyla) - August 23^{2} (Winner)
- Queen of the Night (Whitney Houston) - August 23^{2} (Winner)

2. Camille Cortez

- Tulak Ng Bibig (Julianne Tarroja) - July 4
- No Promises (Shayne Ward) - July 11
- Play That Funky Music (Wild Cherry) - July 18
- Rock with You (Michael Jackson) - July 25
- Sweet Child O' Mine (Guns N' Roses) - August 1
- Superstar (The Carpenters) - August 8
- (I Can't Get No) Satisfaction (The Rolling Stones) (performed with Jet Pangan) - August 15^{2}
- Bed of Roses (Bon Jovi) (performed with Renz Verano) - August 23^{2} (Second Place)
- Since U Been Gone (Kelly Clarkson) (performed with Julia Clarete) - August 23^{2} (Second Place)
- Dirty Diana (Michael Jackson) - August 23^{2} (Second Place)

3. Zyrene Parsad

- Kailan (Smokey Mountain) - July 4
- Together Again (Janet Jackson) - July 11
- Hot Stuff (Donna Summer) - July 18
- Black or White (Michael Jackson) - July 25
- Dangerous (Roxette) - August 1
- Conga (Miami Sound Machine) - August 8
- Single Ladies (Beyoncé) (performed with Sexbomb Girls) - August 15^{2}
- Sino ang Baliw? (Kuh Ledesma) (performed with Kuh Ledesma) - August 23^{2} (Third Place)
- If I Were a Boy (Beyoncé) (performed with Maricris Garcia) - August 23^{2} (Third Place)

4. Alexa Ortega

- Beautiful Girls (JoJo) - July 4
- The Journey (Lea Salonga) - July 11
- Hopelessly Devoted To You (Olivia Newton-John) - July 18
- I'll Be There (The Jackson 5) - July 25
- Material Girl (Madonna) - August 1^{1} (Eliminated)

5. Cara Quiapos

- Fever (Joe Cocker) - July 4
- Girls Just Wanna Have Fun (Cyndi Lauper) - July 11
- Paano (Dulce) - July 18
- Bad (Michael Jackson) - July 25^{1} (Eliminated)

6. Christine Allado

- Infatuation (Christina Aguilera) - July 4
- Narito (Gary Valenciano) - July 11
- Ain't No Mountain High Enough (Marvin Gaye) - July 18^{1} (Eliminated)

7. Shane Tarun

- Dangerously In Love (Beyoncé Knowles) - July 4
- Inside Your Heaven (Carrie Underwood) - July 11 (Eliminated)

8. Rachel Gabreza

- Respect (Aretha Franklin) - July 4 (Eliminated)

^{1} Contenders did not perform because they were eliminated at the beginning of the show. Their elimination songs served as their final performances.

^{2} Contenders performed with notable Filipino artists.

== Ratings ==
According to AGB Nielsen Philippines' Mega Manila household television ratings, the pilot episode of Are You the Next Big Star? earned a 19.3% rating. The final episode scored a 13.3% rating.

== Accolades ==
Accolades received by Are You the Next Big Star?
Year	Award	Category	Recipient	Result	Ref.
2010	24th PMPC Star Awards for Television	Best Talent Search Program	Are You the Next Big Star?	Nominated	
