= Geoff Taylor (singer) =

Filipino singer-model (born 1986)

- Born: Geoffrey Seminiano Taylor; May 26, 1986 (age 40)
- Origin: Olongapo, Philippines
- Genres: OPM, rock
- Occupations: Singer, model, actor
- Years active: 2006–2011
- Label: GMA Records
- Website: Geoff Taylor on iGMA.tv

Geoff Taylor (born May 26, 1986) is a Filipino singer, model and actor. He was a former finalist of Pinoy Dream Academy: Season 1 before becoming the grand winner of the Are You the Next Big Star? together with Frencheska Farr as the female grand winner.

== Early life and career ==
Taylor was born in Olongapo City. His father is of American descent while his mother is a pure Filipina. Before named as the Next Male Big Star of the talent search, Are You the Next Big Star?, he was one of the contestants of ABS-CBN's Pinoy Dream Academy: Season 1 where he was voted off early. Taylor was also a model from Cagayan Valley. After winning Are You the Next Big Star?, he started in various television guestings and shows together with his co-winner, Frencheska Farr. They guested at the christmaserye of GMA Network, Sana Ngayong Pasko. Taylor and Farr was also included in the recently concluded SOP Fully Charged and BandaOke wherein they were included in the BandaOke band along with Jay Perillo. In 2010, Taylor is currently seen in two GMA Network shows: the new musical variety show, Party Pilipinas and the newest season of Daisy Siete, Adam or Eve. After 5 years, Geoff decided to quit his own career without signing his contract.

== Filmography ==
=== Television ===
Year	Title	Role
2006	Pinoy Dream Academy: Season 1	Himself/ Contestant
2006	Super Inggo	Geoff (The Clan)
2009	Are You the Next Big Star?	Himself / Winner
2009	Sana Ngayong Pasko	Teen Jopet
2009–2010	SOP	Himself / Performer
2009–2010	BandaOke: Rock n' Roll to Millions!	Himself / One of the BandaOke band
2010–2011	Party Pilipinas	Himself / Performer
2010	Daisy Siete Season 26: Adam or Eve?	Jeff
2011	Captain Barbell: Ang Pagbabalik	

== Awards and achievements ==
Year	Critics	Category	Results
2009	Are You the Next Big Star?	The Next Male Big Star	Won

== Singles ==
- Hulog ng Langit – with Frencheska Farr (Langit sa Piling Mo Theme Song and Originally performed by Donna Cruz)
