= Sana Ngayong Pasko =

Philippine television drama series

- Title card
- Also known as: A Christmas Hope
- Genre: Drama
- Developed by: Senedy Que
- Directed by: Mike Tuviera
- Starring: Susan Roces
- Theme music composer: Jimmy Borja
- Opening theme: "Sana Ngayong Pasko" by Ariel Rivera
- Country of origin: Philippines
- Original language: Tagalog
- No. of episodes: 25

Production
- Executive producer: Wilma Galvante
- Production locations: Metro Manila, Philippines; Santa Maria, Bulacan, Philippines
- Camera setup: Multiple-camera setup
- Running time: 30–45 minutes
- Production company: GMA Entertainment TV

Original release
- Network: GMA Network
- Release: December 7, 2009 – January 8, 2010

Sana Ngayong Pasko (transl. hope this Christmas / international title: A Christmas Hope) is a Philippine television drama series broadcast by GMA Network. Directed by Mike Tuviera, it stars Susan Roces. It premiered on December 7, 2009 on the network's Telebabad line up. The series concluded on January 8, 2010, with a total of 25 episodes.

The series is streaming online on YouTube.

== Cast and characters ==
Cast

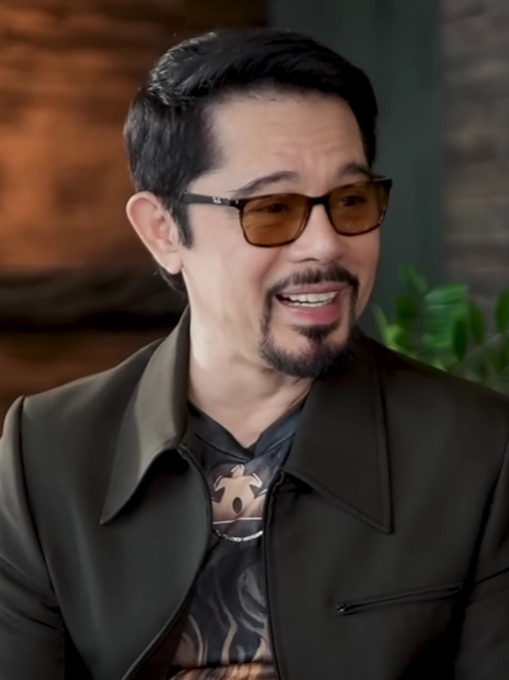
Christopher de Leon

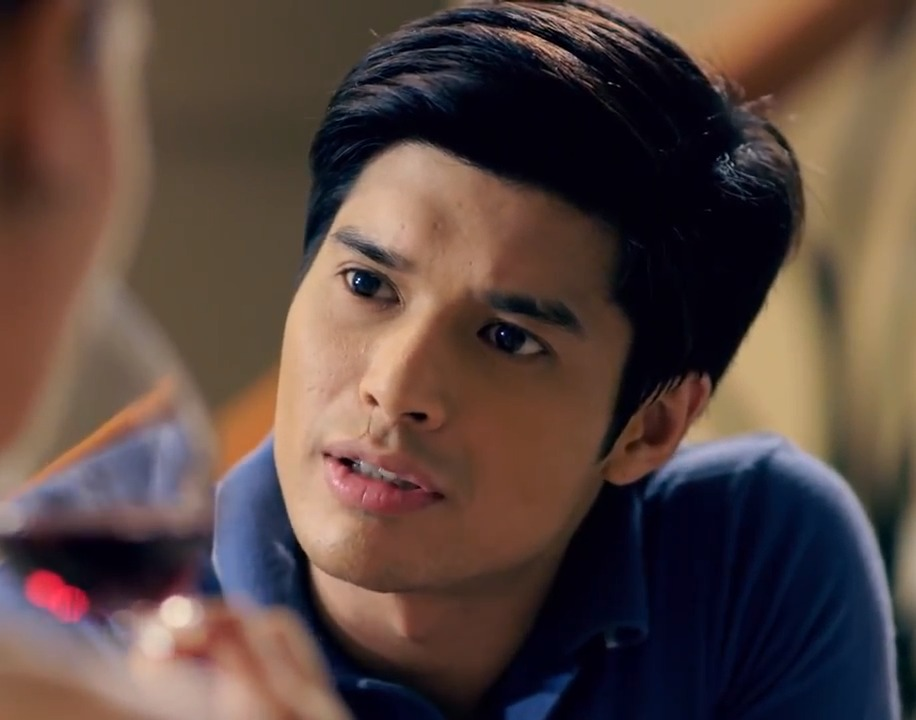
JC de Vera

Lead cast

- Susan Roces as Remedios Dionisio

Supporting cast

- Christopher de Leon as Gordon Dionisio
- Gina Alajar as Felicidad "Fely" Dionisio
- TJ Trinidad as Stephen Dionisio
- Dante Rivero as Pablo Dionisio
- Eddie Gutierrez as Ernesto Dionisio
- Ces Quesada as Narcisa
- JC de Vera as Rigo Dionisio
- Maxene Magalona as Irene Dionisio
- JC Tiuseco as Bernie
- Ynna Asistio as Happy
- Jacob Rica as Jopet Dionisio
- Francine Prieto as Aisha Dionisio

Guest cast

- Carmina Villarroel as younger Remedios
- Zoren Legaspi as young Ernesto
- Jomari Yllana as younger Pablo
- Renz Valerio as younger Gordon
- Sandy Talag as younger Fely
- Dion Ignacio as Julius
- Pen Medina as a priest
- John Arcilla as King
- Ian Veneracion as Emmanuel
- Arnell Ignacio as Wanda
- Biboy Ramirez as Danny
- Janine Desiderio as Divine
- Geoff Taylor as teenage Jopet
- Frencheska Farr as Elivra
- Yassi Pressman as Valeria

== Production ==
Principal photography commenced in November 2009.

== Ratings ==
According to AGB Nielsen Philippines' Mega Manila household television ratings, the pilot episode of Sana Ngayong Pasko earned a 22.2% rating. The final episode scored a 25.3% rating.

== Accolades ==
Accolades received by Sana Ngayong Pasko
Year	Award	Category	Recipient	Result	Ref.
2010	Seoul International Drama Awards	Best Drama	Sana Ngayon Pasko	Nominated	
2010	Seoul International Drama Awards	Best Actress	Susan Roces	Nominated	
2010	24th PMPC Star Awards for Television	Best Actress	Susan Roces	Nominated	
