= Marco Morales =

- Born: Marco Paolo Z. Morales; July 16, 1982 (age 43); Bulacan, Philippines
- Other name: Von
- Occupations: Actor, Model
- Years active: 2007–2011

Marco Paolo Z. Morales (born July 16, 1982), widely known as Marco Morales, is a television and film actor in the Philippines.

== Life and career ==
Morales was born in Bulacan, Philippines. He started his acting career in 2007 including You Got Me! and Paano Kita Iibigin where he played some minor roles. He had a small role in the GMA Films My Best Friend's Girlfriend directed by Mark A. Reyes. In 2008 he had a part in the Joel Lamangan film "Walang Kawala" starring Polo Ravales and Joseph Bitangcol where he was tagged as the "frontal nudity king." He also did Butas, Booking, Big Time, Pipo and Heavenly Touch, where he co-starred with Paolo Serrano and Gwen Garci. He's in DMV Entertainment's indie movie I Luv DreamGuyz, directed by Joel Lamangan released in 2009. His new film is currently filming in Dipolog with a working title Linabo.

Aside from movies he is also a television actor where he had a recurring role in Bud Brothers which was recently aired on ABS-CBN. In 2010 he got a supporting role in GMA Network's series Heaven In Your Arms starring Heart Evangelista and Katrina Halili. In August 2010, Morales was chosen for a part in the television pilot of GMA Network's Koreana playing Phillip Jung. Unfortunately his character was killed off due to his commitment in the film Linabo.

== Arrest ==
The independent film actor was arrested by the Makati police in June 2013. Morales was charged with fraud, and released after posting an P8,000 cash bond.

== Filmography ==
=== Television ===
Year	Title	Role
2010-2011	Koreana	Phillip Jung
2010	Langit sa Piling Mo	Warren Castillo
2009	Bud Brothers	Lance Banaag
2008	SiS	Himself
2008	Rakista(TV series)	Sonny

=== Film ===
Year	Title	Role	Notes
2011	Linabo	Luke	Filming
2010	Astro Mayabang	Iggy	2010 release; Indie film
2010	Boy Toys	Duke	2010 release; Indie film
2010	Pagnanasa	Anton	2010 release; Indie film
2010	Halik sa Tubig	Jonathan	2010 release; Indie film
2009	The Consul of Sodom	Johnny	2009 release; Indie film
2009	I Love Dreamguyz	Rico	2009 release; Indie film
2009	Pipo	Mark	2009 release; Indie film
2009	Big Night	Abel	2009 release; Indie film
2009	Heavenly Touch	Biboy	2009 release; Indie film
2009	Booking	Lando	2009 release; Indie film
2009	Butas	Virgo	2009 release; Indie film
2009	Off World	Kiko	2009 release; Indie film
2008	Walang Kawala	Tolits	Indie film
2008	My Bestfriend's Girlfriend	Dave	Theater released
2007	Hanggang Dito na Lamang at Maraming Salamat	Callboy	Indie film
2007	Paano Kita Iibigin	Sean	Theater released
2007	You Got Me!	SWAT	Theater released
