= Rescue Mission (TV series) =

Philippine television comedy show

- Genre: Comedy
- Starring: TJ Trinidad
- Country of origin: Philippines
- Original language: Filipino
- No. of episodes: 11

Production
- Running time: 30 minutes

Original release
- Network: TV5
- Release: November 27, 2008 – February 5, 2009

Rescue Mission is a Philippine television comedy show and broadcast by TV5. Hosted by TJ Trinidad, it aired from November 27, 2008 to February 5, 2009, replacing Rakista.

== See also ==
- List of TV5 original programming
