= Koreana (TV series) =

Philippine television drama series

- Title card
- Also known as: Jenna; 한국소녀
- Genre: Drama
- Developed by: Dode Cruz
- Directed by: Gil Tejada Jr.
- Creative director: Jun Lana
- Starring: Kris Bernal
- Theme music composer: Bobby Velasco
- Opening theme: "The Real Me" by Pop Girls
- Country of origin: Philippines
- Original languages: Tagalog; Korean
- No. of episodes: 100

Production
- Executive producer: Kaye Atienza-Cadsawan
- Camera setup: Multiple-camera setup
- Running time: 19–30 minutes
- Production company: GMA Entertainment TV

Original release
- Network: GMA Network
- Release: October 11, 2010 – February 25, 2011

Koreana (transl. Korean / international title: Jenna / Korean: 한국 소녀; Hanja: 韓國 小女; RR: Hanguk Sonyeo; MR: Hanguk Sonyŏ) is a Philippine television drama series broadcast by GMA Network. Directed by Gil Tejada Jr., it stars Kris Bernal in the title role. It premiered on October 11, 2010 on the network's Haponalo line up. The series concluded on February 25, 2011, with a total of 100 episodes.

The series is streaming online on YouTube.

== Cast and characters ==
Cast

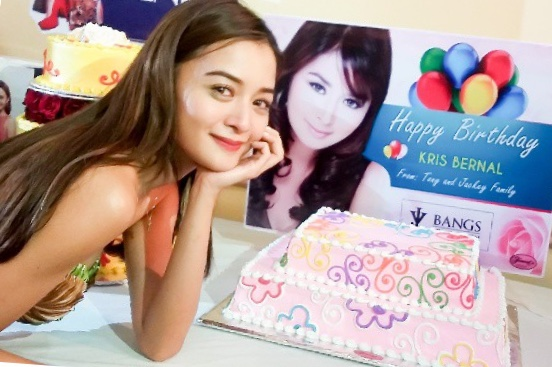
Kris Bernal

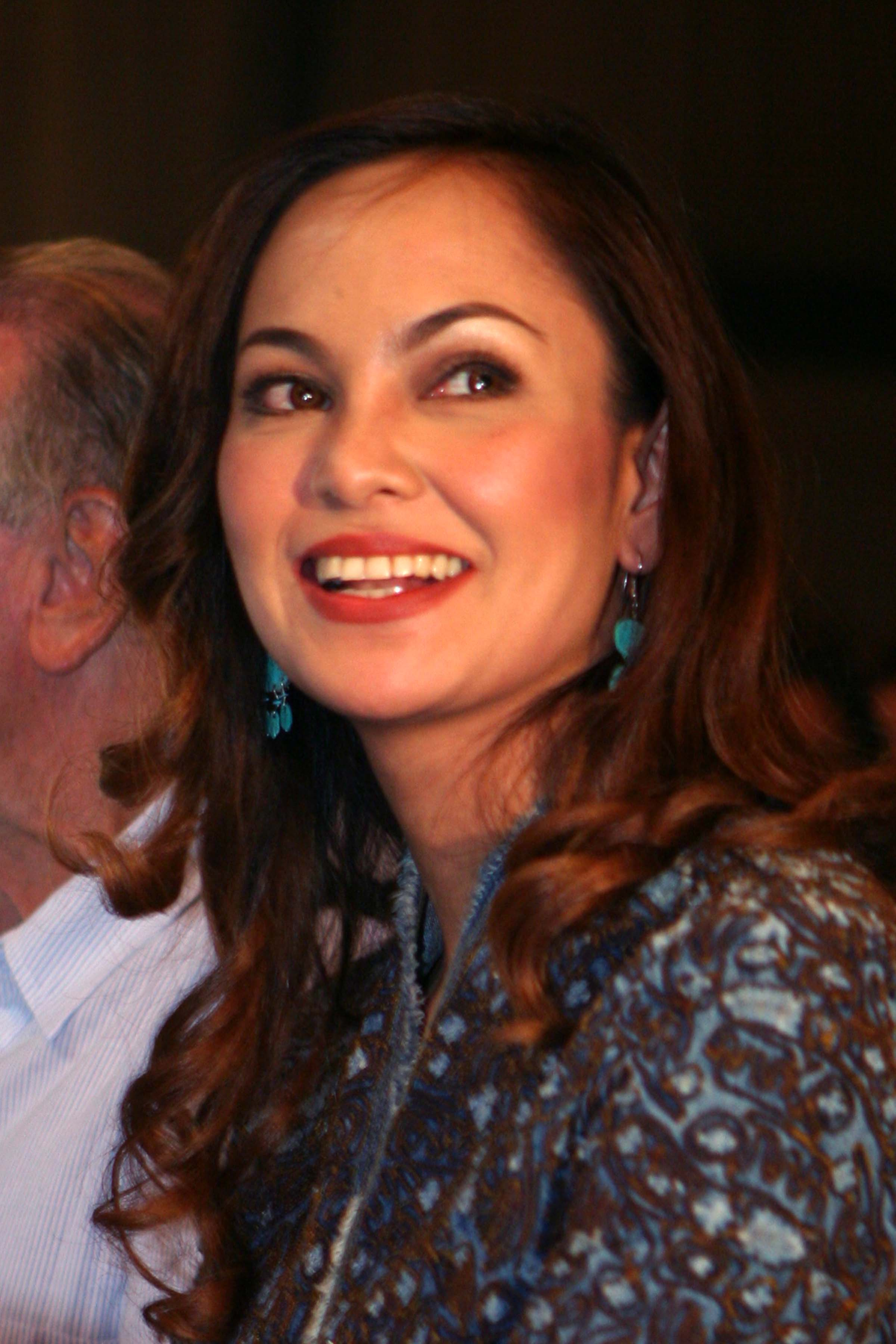
Eula Valdez

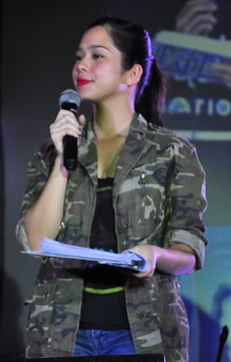
Saab Magalona

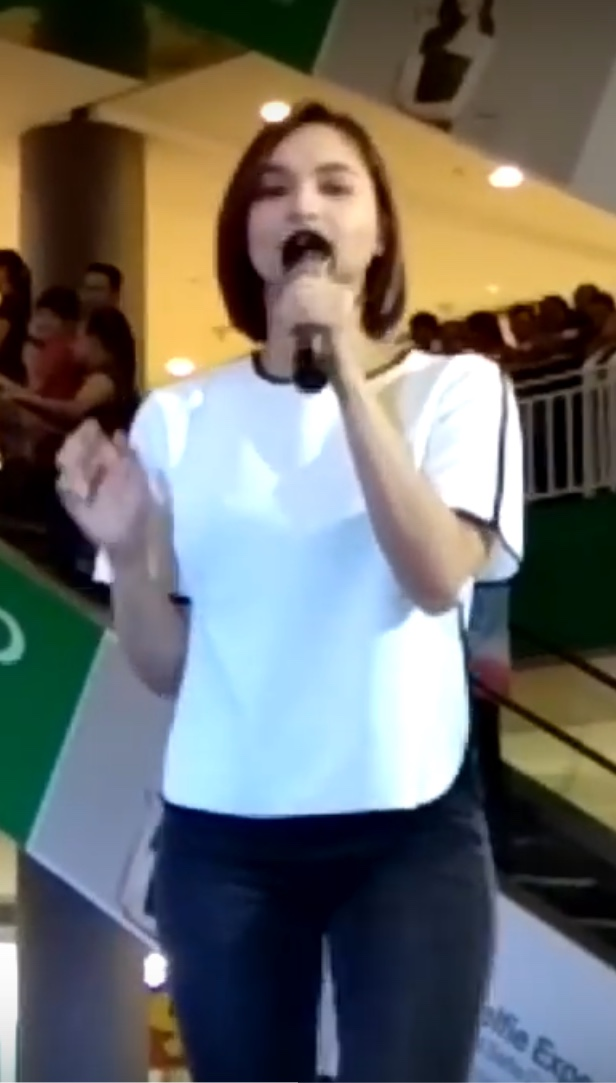
Ryza Cenon

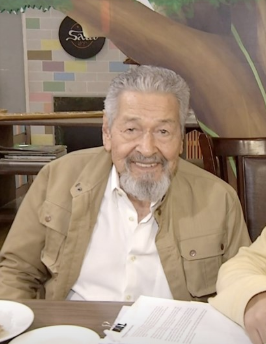
Eddie Garcia

Lead cast

- Kris Bernal as Jennifer "Jenny" Jung / Jenna Bartolome Jung

Supporting cast

- Rocco Nacino as Benjamin "Benjo" Bautista Jr.
- Eddie Garcia as Chang Hee Jung
- Eula Valdez as Violeta Jung / Violeta Salcedo
- Angelu de Leon as Nerissa Jung
- Saab Magalona as Ivy Jung
- Steven Silva as Joshua Lee
- Lotlot de Leon as Josefina Bartolome
- Sylvia Sanchez as Sandra Rosales
- Joyce Ching as Amy Shin
- Luigi Revilla as Jess Romano
- Marco Morales as Phillip Jung
- Catherine Kiok Lay as Cathy
- Ryza Cenon as Darlene Roces
- Gladys Guevarra as Ada
- Irene Lee as Louise Min
- Julienne Rosalio as Bebeng
- Dennis Roque as Larry Go
- Sarah Lahbati as Tamara Lee
- Janna Victoria as Maribel "Bel" Torres
- Mike Lloren as Melchor
- Dex Quindoza as Wen

== Production ==
Principal photography commenced in September 2010.

== Ratings ==
According to AGB Nielsen Philippines' Mega Manila People/Individual television ratings, the pilot episode of Koreana earned a 5.9% rating. The final episode scored a 10.5% rating.

== Accolades ==
Accolades received by Koreana
Year	Award	Category	Recipient	Result	Ref.
2011	Golden Screen TV Awards	Outstanding Breakthrough Performance by an Actor	Rocco Nacino	Nominated	
2011	25th PMPC Star Awards for Television	Best Daytime Drama Series	Koreana	Nominated	
2011	25th PMPC Star Awards for Television	Best New Male TV Personality	Luigi Revilla	Nominated	
