= CJ de Silva =

Filipino artist (1987–2024)

CJ de Silva-Ong
- Born: Christiana Jade de Silva; August 1, 1987; Manila, Philippines
- Died: June 18, 2024 (aged 36); Philippines
- Occupation(s): Painter, graphic designer
- Spouse(s): Wincy Aquino Ong (m. 2013)

Christiana Jade de Silva-Ong (August 1, 1987 – June 18, 2024) was a Filipino art director, painter, illustrator, and graphic designer. She was known as a "Gifted Child" and a "Promil Kid", being featured in an infant formula ad in 1998. She staged three major solo-artist exhibitions and worked as a senior art director.

== Background ==
De Silva was born in Manila and was raised in Malabon, just north of the capital city. She attended the St. Scholastica's College Manila and in 2008 graduated magna cum laude from the University of the Philippines Diliman, College of Fine Arts, with a degree in Visual Communication.

== Work ==
=== Exhibitions ===
De Silva staged three major solo-artist exhibitions and participated in many joint art shows throughout the years.

- CJ de Silva: The First Solo Exhibit (1998) - The Ayala Museum, Makati
- CJ de Silva: The Year After (1999) - The Ayala Museum, Makati
- Gift for the Gifted (2003) - Philam Life Theater Lobby, Manila City
- stART with Mio (2009), A Benefit Exhibit - Gallery 7, Eastwood
- 8 Clinique: You Are a Work of Art (2012) - Whitespace Gallery, Makati
- 16x16 Young Star Philippines' 16th Anniversary Exhibit (2012) - Rockwell Powerplant Mall, Makati
- Bloom Arts Festival (2012) - Cubao X, Cubao, Quezon City
- Bloom Arts Festival (2013) - The Collective, Makati

=== Illustration and Graphic Design ===
CJ de Silva illustrated the 2006 First Prize awardee in the Carlos Palanca Memorial Awards for Literature, Ang Ikaklit sa Aming Hardin, written by Bernadette Villanueva Neri. She also designed and illustrated the album art of itchyworms' fifth studio album After All This Time. De Silva also illustrated some fictional gig posters as part of the marketing campaign for Quark Henares' film Rakenrol. CJ de Silva's illustrations were also featured in Esquire Philippines. She was also known for painting and illustrating on sneakers and became one of Keds Philippines ambassadors.

=== Advertising ===
Right after graduating from college, de Silva started working in TBWA\Santiago Mangada Puno. Being part of the Creative team, she won a few advertising awards. She was part of the team that won the Philippines' first Webby Award for the internet film entitled "A Toy Love Story That Will Make You Cry". She was most recently the Executive Creative Director of the agency.

== Personal life and death ==
In 2013, de Silva married director Wincy Aquino Ong. They have a podcast called Telebabad Tapes.

De Silva died of two strokes and an aneurysm on June 18, 2024, at the age of 36. Her death was confirmed a day later by her husband, Wincy Ong.
