= Frencheska Farr =

Filipino singer and actress

Frencheska Farr-Jose
- Birth name: Marie Frencheska Mae Tobias Farr
- Also known as: Maqui, Cheska
- Born: September 9, 1992 (age 32); Pasay, Philippines
- Origin: Las Piñas, Philippines
- Genres: OPM, Pop, R&B
- Occupation(s): Actress, singer, model
- Years active: 2009–2017
- Labels: GMA Music (2009–2016)
- Spouse: Gino Leonardo T. Jose (m. 2018)

Marie Frencheska Mae Tobias Farr-Jose (born September 9, 1992) is a Filipino singer, actress and model. She was the Are You the Next Big Star? grand champion along with Geoff Taylor.

== Early life and career ==
Farr was born in Pasay, Philippines. She graduated from St. Paul College of Parañaque. Her father is of British descent.

She was named the Next Female Big Star along with Geoff Taylor as the Next Male Big Star on the television show "Are You the Next Big Star?". Along with winning the contest, they each received one million pesos (P1,000,000), a condominium unit from Avida, a management contract from GMA Artist Center and a recording contract from GMA Records. After winning Are You the Next Big Star?, she started in various television guestings and shows. She guested at the Christmaserye of GMA Network, Sana Ngayong Pasko. She was also included in SOP. She also became a part of the BandaOke wherein she was included in the BandaOke band along with her Are You the Next Big Star? co-batchmates, Geoff Taylor and Jay Perillo. In the movie industry, Farr bested other actresses as she wins the lead role in the Filipino musical movie, Emir. Farr is formerly seen in the musical variety show of Party Pilipinas. On September 6, 2015, Farr is also joining to the new Sunday musical program Sunday Central Club with the divas Rachelle Ann Go, Jaya, La Diva, Julie Anne San Jose and Kyla. On January 4, 2016, Farr joins the program Dinggin Mo Oh Dios with Reymond Sajor, Rachelle Ann Go, Jonalyn Viray and Aicelle Santos for the program. On February 21, 2016, Frencheska Farr made a 4th interpretur winner of Sunday Central Club Battle of the Champions.

== Filmography ==
=== Television ===
Year	Title	Role
2009–2010	BandaOke: Rock n' Roll to Millions!	Herself / One of the BandaOke band
2009–2010	SOP	Herself / Performer
2009	Sana Ngayong Pasko	Cheska
2009	Are You the Next Big Star?	Herself / Winner
2010–2013	Party Pilipinas	Herself / Performer
2010	Reel Love	Herself / Guest Singer
2011	Captain Barbell	Celina Fernandez / Sonica
2011–2012	Ruben Marcelino's Kokak	Rafa
2012	Maynila: Byaheng Puso	Guest / Singer
2012	Maynila: Devoted to You	Via
2012	One True Love	Violy
2012	Tinig: A True-to-Life Story of Dulce	Dulce
2013	Bukod Kang Pinagpala	Dina
2013–2015	Sunday All Stars	Herself / Performer
2013	Binoy Henyo	Sandra
2014	Innamorata	Jenny
2015	Second Chances	Penny Ampil
2015	Magpakailanman: The Roland "Bunot" Abante Story	Lising
2015	Pari 'Koy	Miriam
2015	Maynila: Love vs Dreams	Angely
2015	Because of You	Molly
2016	Just Duet	Herself / Performer
2016	New Day	Herself / Guest
2016	Dishkarte of the Day	Herself / Guest
2016	Alamat (season 2)	Dama / Narrator

=== Films ===
Year	Title	Role
2010	Emir	Amelia Florentino
2012	P.S. I Love You	Sarah
2012	143	
2014	After Class	

=== Studio album ===
Year	Title	Certification	Sales	Track listing
2010	Inside My Heart: Released: 2010; Label: GMA Records	Double Platinum (certified by PARI)	Php 25,000	Track listing: 1. Everytime; 2. Sa Pangarap Ko; 3. Today I'll See The Sun; 4. This Feeling; 5. Isama Mo Ako; 6. Suddenly It's Magic; 7. Ang Pag-ibig Kong Ito; 8. I Still Haven't Found (What I'm Looking For); 9. Bakit Ikaw; 10. Inside My Heart

== Awards and achievements ==
Year	Critics	Category	Result
2009	Are You the Next Big Star?	The Next Female Big Star	Won
2010	41st GMMSF Box-Office Entertainment Awards	Most Promising Performer/ Singer	Won
2011	Asia Model Festival	Best Female Model	Won
2011	ENPRESS Golden Screen Awards	Breakthrough Performance by an Actress – Emir	Won

== Television and film theme songs ==
- Sabihin Mo Sa Akin – (SRO Cinemaserye: Ganti Theme Song)
- Hulog ng Langit – with Geoff Taylor (Langit sa Piling Mo Theme Song)
- Reunions – Reunions Theme Song
- Everytime Reel Love Presents: Tween Hearts Theme Song
- Ang Pag-ibig Kong Ito – Temptation of Wife Theme Song
- Sa Pangarap ko – Alakdana Theme Song
- Suddenly It's Magic – My Valentine Girls Theme Song
- Isama Mo Ako – Captain Barbell Love Theme Song
- Alice Bungisngis – Alice Bungisngis and her Wonder Walis Theme Song
- Inside My Heart – Moon Embracing the Sun Theme Song
- Ang Tanging Sinta – Alamat ng Dama de Noche Theme Song
- Kape at Balita – with Frank Magalona (Kape at Balita Theme Song)
