= Narda =

Filipino rock band

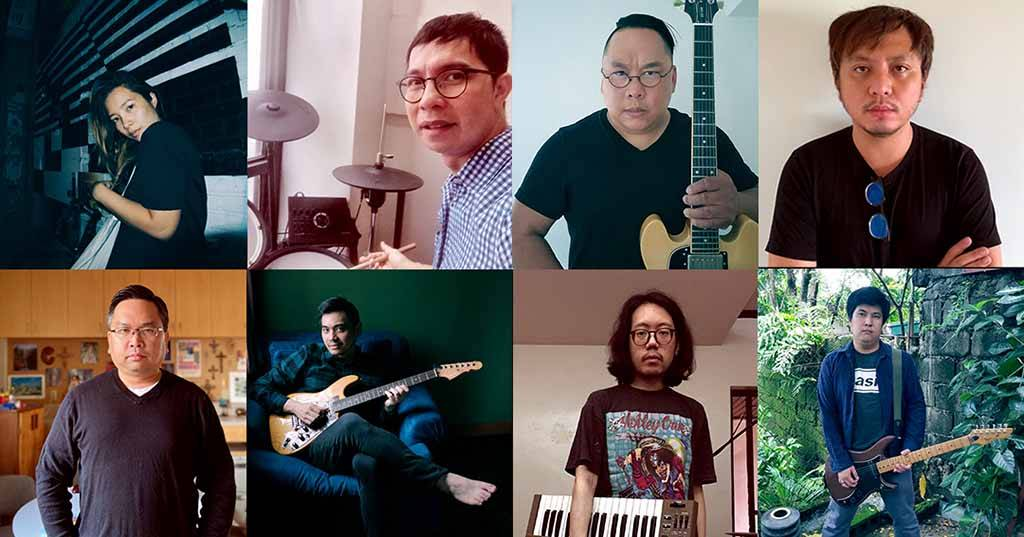
- Narda members in 2022. Top row (L-R) Katwo Puertollano, Ryan Villena, JV Javier, Wincy Ong. Bottom row (L-R) Ed Ibarra, Nico Africa, Jep Cruz, Tani Santos

Background information
- Origin: Quezon City, Philippines
- Genres: Post-punk revival; alternative rock; new rave; acoustic rock; indie rock
- Years active: 2002–2007, 2022
- Labels: Ponkan Music (2002–2005) eVille Productions (2006–2007); Island Records Philippines (2020–present)
- Past members: Katwo Librando; Ryan Villena; Wincy Aquino Ong; JV Javier; Ed Ibarra; Nico Africa; Jep Cruz; Tani Santos; Yaps Estagle
- Website: Official site

Narda was a Filipino rock band, formed in Quezon City, Metro Manila in 2002 by drummer Ryan Villena, bassist Wincy Aquino Ong, vocalist Katwo Librando, and guitarists JV Javier and Ed Ibarra. Successive line-ups included guitarists Nico Africa and Tani Santos, and keyboardists Jep Cruz and Yaps Estagle.

The band was known as a pioneering act in the Philippine indie rock scene from 2002 to 2007, one of the first to have recorded and released their music independently.

== History ==
Ryan Villena (drummer) had already been playing in several bands in his formative years. He started playing with Tungaw, a four-piece band which frequented Club Dredd in the heyday of the Filipino alternative music explosion in the 1990s. Villena was also a founding member of Brownman Revival (played keyboards), did session percussion work for Tropical Depression, and drummed for Romeo Lee and the Brown Briefs (with ex-Tungaw mates bassist Jing Gaddi and guitarist Mark Villena ).

Tungaw disbanded in 1998, when Ryan formed Lilian along with college friends from his Tanghalang Ateneo days, (which included Pupil's Yan Yuzon, Xander Angeles on guitar, Patrick Tuason on keyboards and Mimi Chu on vocals) in early 2000. Due to line-up changes, their demo was left unfinished. Through Conrad Javier of Boy Elroy, Ryan was introduced to Katwo Librando (who sang with Bent on Crickets) and asked her to do vocals for Lilian. Katwo jumped at the opportunity and Lilian version-2 launched with guitarist Wincy Aquino Ong.

After playing a gig at an Ayala Mountaineers party (playing original songs "Crime Fighting Mama", "Tanga", and "Suwerte"), a misunderstanding with Yan Yuzon occurred, which caused Lilian to disband. By this time, Ryan took Jing Gaddi's suggestion that JV Javier play guitar for them because JV's melodic bluesy style would fit into the band's mold. This left Ryan, Katwo, JV and Wincy in limbo, as they had a number of potential pop hits but without a band.

In a chat one afternoon, Ryan invited an Ateneo faculty member, Ed Ibarra, during a break from their graduate studies. With three guitarists, Wincy then took over the bass duties and the group jammed on July 31, 2002. Thus, Narda was formed, at that time: Ryan on drums, JV and Ed on guitars, Wincy on bass, and Katwo on vocals.

Narda formed with three main objectives; namely, to write and play their original songs, to have fun, and to help out people. Due to Ryan and Ed's connection with the Ateneo de Manila High School, a portion of Narda's EP sales would go to the Tulong Dunong Scholarship Fund, which aimed to assist worthy public school students to study at the Ateneo and other private schools.

By October 2002, Narda had recorded their first EP, A Postcard From, containing four songs ("Crime Fighting Mama", "Hypochondriac", "Meron Ba" and "Kusina"). Then on December 13, 2002, the band released its second EP titled Suwerte (translated: "Good Luck"), also containing four songs ("Tanga", "In the Afternoon", "Leave" and "Suwerte").

Over Christmas vacation of 2002, Narda recorded their stripped-down acoustic EP called Burador. "Burador" was released early 2003 containing four songs ("Another Day", "Pasensya Na", Santong Paspasan" and "Ang Gabi").

By 2003, Narda was gigging heavily and their songs were earning steady airplay over NU 107. Narda started recording their fourth EP Salaguinto't Salagubang in the summer of 2003, which carried five songs ("Vanillin", "Daylight Savings Time", "Saan Na?", "Liwanag" and "Jaywalker"). The EP was launched at the now defunct Millenia on September 30, 2003. By this time, original guitarist Ibarra had left the band for a day job and former Lilian guitarist Nico Africa had rejoined his former bandmates in Narda, who played during the EP launch.

Releasing four EPs in a span of a year would earn the band several guestings on NU 107's In the Raw show with Francis Brew. The single "Jaywalker" also started gaining airplay on NU 107. Narda would then go on to win the NU 107 Rock Awards' In the Raw Award for 2003.

During this time, Narda consisted of Ryan on drums, JV and Nico on guitar, Wincy on bass, and Katwo on vocals. Narda then had intense songwriting sessions in late 2003 to early 2004 for their first full-length album. Recording the album Formika took exactly one year (from February 2004 to February 2005), and was released (under Ponkan Music) on March 5, 2005 at Gasoline Alley containing 12 tracks ("Pantalon", "1-800-HEY", "Kometa Astrolabe", "Nico", "Biyernes", "Glum", "Detox", "Hudas Not Pay", "Tayo Na", "Disquiet", "Lipad (Theme from Darna)" and "Salamin Sibuyas/Tetrapak)". Formika wound up on critics' best-of-2005 lists.

After several gigs pushing their album Formika, gigging took its toll on guitarists JV and Nico. The two amicably decided to leave the band due to work concerns right about the time Narda was to celebrate its third anniversary.

Narda then recruited Jep Cruz for keyboard duties with Wincy sliding to guitar duties again. The third incarnation brought them a new sound, returning to their late '70s to '80s new wave roots.

In late 2005, Wincy left Narda to pursue his career in filmmaking. He was replaced by Tani Santos. In 2006, Yaps Estagle joined Narda for additional synth duties.

Narda recruited Mike Dizon and Mong Alcaraz (of the bands Sandwich and Chicosci) as their producers, and released Discotillion on September 22, 2006.

== Reunion ==
The band had two reunion gigs after their break-up in 2007.

On September 30, 2009, the band reunited for a one-night-only gig in Mag:Net Bonifacio High Street as a tribute to Alexis Tioseco and Nika Bohinc, and as a benefit of the victims of Typhoon Ondoy.

On February 1, 2012, ten years after its formation and five years removed from their breakup, the band played their final gig at Saguijo.

On July 13, 2020, the original line-up of Katwo, Ryan, Wincy, JV and Ed, together with Nico and Tani, recorded a new track during the COVID-19 lockdown, a song penned by Katwo, to drum up publicity of the digital remasters of their 2002-2003 releases on Spotify.

Their first single in 14 years, "Juskopo", received strong reviews, with TheRestIsNoise.ph describing it as "a riff-based punk number that takes tasteful detours into psych-rock territory".

== Discotrillion vinyl release ==
In 2021, at the height of the COVID-19 pandemic, the band re-recorded the tracks from Discotillion in time for the album's fifteenth year anniversary, this time with the new eight-piece iteration. Renamed Discotrilion, the vinyl release under Backspacer Records includes four additional and exclusive tracks: "Wagwagan Love", "Mr. Sindak", "Duwag" and "Ikaw Lamang". The vinyl was pressed on opaque pink colored vinyl and is a limited release with 300 numbered copies.

The single "Ikaw Lamang" was released under Island Records Philippines on April 22, 2022.

Discotrillion was mastered for vinyl by Ely Buendia at Crow's Nest Studio. The gatefold album artwork and design, which saw the band as would-be action stars on a hand-painted billboard, was made by China Principe and Rezonate.

The official vinyl release took place on April 23, 2022 at Backspacer Records in Pasig with members Ryan Villena, Wincy Aquino Ong, Nico Africa, Tani Santos, and Jep Cruz in attendance.

The song "Mr. Sindak" was nominated for Best Alternative Recording at the 2023 Awit Awards. The album cover, designed by China Principe and Rezonate, received a nomination for Best Cover Art.

== Collaboration with Brutalist Pilipinas ==
On Independence Day, June 12, 2022, Narda released a music video for their single "Ang Buhay T'wing Wala Ka" which pays homage to the country's Brutalist architecture. The motion graphics-driven music video is an ode to Brutalist architecture in the Philippines made in cooperation with archivist-preservationist group Brutalist Pilipinas. It features the works of architects like Froilan Hong, Arturo Luz, and, most prominently, National Artist for Architecture Leandro Locsin.

== Band members ==
- Katwo Librando - vocals (2002–2007)
- Ryan Villena - drums, synths, keyboard (2002–2007)
- Wincy Aquino Ong bass, guitars, piano (2002–2005)
- JV Javier guitar (2002–2005)
- Ed Ibarra guitar (2002–2003)
- Nico Africa guitar (2002–2005)
- Tani Santos - guitar (2005–2007)
- Jep Cruz - synths (2005–2006)
- Yaps Estagle - synths (2006–2007)

== Discography ==
- A Postcard From (2002)
- Suwerte (2002)
- Burador (2003)
- Salaguinto't Salagubang (2003)
- Formika (2005)
- Discotillion (2006)
