= List of awards and nominations received by SB19 =

SB19 awards and nominations
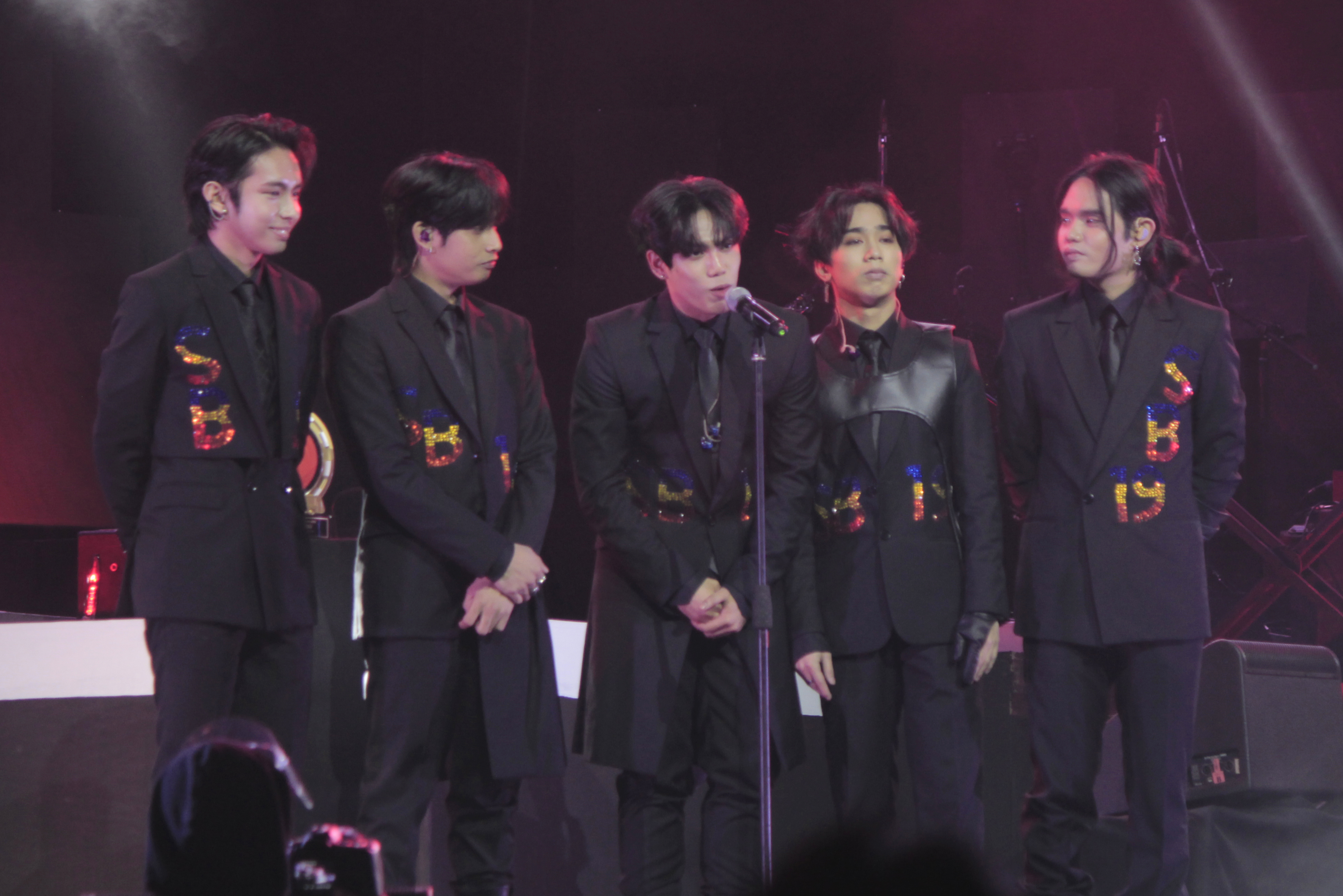
- SB19 at the 2021 Wish 107.5 Music Awards
Awards and nominations
| Award | Wins | Nominations |
| Aliw Awards | 1 | 2 |
| Asia Artist Awards | 2 | 2 |
| Awit Awards | 21 | 54 |
| Billboard Korea Power 100 | 1 | 1 |
| Billboard Music Awards | 0 | 1 |
| Box Office Entertainment Awards | 2 | 2 |
| BreakTudo Awards | 2 | 8 |
| Dangal ng Musikang Pilipino | 1 | 1 |
| Filipino Music Awards | 9 | 14 |
| Grammy Awards | 0 | 1 |
| MTV Europe Music Awards | 0 | 1 |
| Music Awards Japan | 0 | 1 |
| Myx Music Awards | 8 | 8 |
| NCCA Sudi National Music Awards | 1 | 1 |
| Nickelodeon Kids' Choice Awards | 1 | 1 |
| Nylon Manila Big Bold Brave Awards | 8 | 9 |
| P-pop Music Awards | 21 | 32 |
| PMPC Star Awards for Music | 17 | 24 |
| TikTok Awards Philippines | 3 | 3 |
| Wish 107.5 Music Awards | 23 | 29 |

Totals (Note: Certain award groups do not simply award one winner. They acknowledge several different recipients, have runners-up, and have third place. Since this is a specific recognition and is different from losing an award, runner-up mentions are considered wins in this award tally. For simplification and to avoid errors, each award in this list has been presumed to have had a prior nomination.)
- Wins: 121
- Nominations: 195

The Filipino boy band SB19 has received numerous awards and nominations for their contributions to music. The formation of the group started in 2016 when a South Korean talent agency, ShowBT Entertainment, selected the band's members from a talent search that year to undergo training. They began their career in 2018 with the release of their debut single, "Tilaluha", which had weak reception. The group achieved mainstream success with the release of "Go Up" in 2019, which won them awards for Song of the Year and Wishclusive Pop Performance of the Year at the 2020 ceremonies of Myx Music Awards and Wish 107.5 Music Awards, respectively. This led to them being awarded the Favorite Breakthrough Artist of the Year at the 2020 Awit Awards. The group released their debut studio album, Get in the Zone, in 2020; its single, "Alab (Burning)", won Music Video of the Year and Song of the Year awards at the 2021 Myx Music Awards.

In 2021, SB19 became the first Southeast Asian and Filipino act to be nominated for Top Social Artist at the Billboard Music Awards and received a nomination for Best Southeast Asian Act at the 2021 MTV Europe Music Awards. That year, the National Commission for Culture and the Arts also appointed the group as Youth and Sentro Rizal Ambassadors for promoting Filipino culture. The band's first extended play (EP), Pagsibol, was released in 2021 and won Album of the Year and Pop Album of the Year at the 14th PMPC Star Awards for Music. Its singles "What?", "Mapa", and "Bazinga", also won Awit Awards for Best Global Recording, Best Performance by a Group Recording Artist, and Best Dance Recording, respectively, in 2022. The group released two standalone singles, "WYAT (Where You At)" and "Nyebe", in 2022. Both received multiple nominations at the 2023 Awit Awards, including Song of the Year, while "WYAT" won Best Electronic/Dance Recording.

SB19 released their second EP, Pagtatag!, in 2023, which received an Album of the Year nomination at the 2024 Awit Awards. Its songs, including "Gento" and "I Want You", earned multiple nominations at the 2024 Awit Awards and Wish 107.5 Music Awards, with "Gento" winning Best Dance/Electronic Recording at the former and "I Want You" winning Wishclusive R&B Performance of the Year at the latter. In 2024, SB19 collaborated with Gloc-9 on "Kalakal", which won Wish Song Collaboration of the Year at the 2025 Wish 107.5 Music Awards. Other honors received by the group include the Best Artist Award – Singer at the 2023 Asia Artist Awards, Favorite Asian Act at the 2024 Kids' Choice Awards, and four consecutive Wish Group of the Year awards at the Wish 107.5 Music Awards from 2021 to 2024. On November 16, 2026, SB19 received their first Grammy Award nomination for their single "Visa" in the inaugural Best Asian Pop Music Performance category at the 69th Annual Grammy Awards.

== Awards and nominations ==
List of awards and nominations received by SB19
| Award | Year (Note: Indicates the year of ceremony. Each year is linked to the article about the awards held that year, wherever possible.) | Recipient(s) | Category | Result | Ref. |
|---|---|---|---|---|---|
| Aliw Awards | 2020 | SB19 | People's Choice Award | Won | |
| Aliw Awards | 2024 | Pagtatag! World Tour | Best Collaboration in a Concert | Nominated | |
| Asia Artist Awards | 2023 | SB19 | Best Artist Award – Singer | Won | |
| Asia Artist Awards | 2023 | SB19 | Hot Trend Award | Won | |
| Awit Awards | 2020 | SB19 | Favorite Breakthrough Artist of the Year | Won | |
| Awit Awards | 2020 | "Alab (Burning)" | Best Performance by a Group Recording Artist | Nominated | |
| Awit Awards | 2021 | "Hanggang sa Huli" | People's Voice Favorite Song | Won | |
| Awit Awards | 2021 | "Hanggang sa Huli" | Best Music Video | Nominated | |
| Awit Awards | 2021 | "Hanggang sa Huli" | Best Performance by a Group Recording Artist | Nominated | |
| Awit Awards | 2022 | "Kapangyarihan" (with Ben&Ben) | Best Collaboration | Nominated | |
| Awit Awards | 2022 | "Mapa" | Best Performance by a Group Recording Artist | Won | |
| Awit Awards | 2022 | "Mapa" | Song of the Year | Nominated | |
| Awit Awards | 2022 | "Mapa" | Most Streamed Song | Won | |
| Awit Awards | 2022 | "Mapa" | Best Vocal Arrangement | Won | |
| Awit Awards | 2022 | Pagsibol | Album of the Year | Nominated | |
| Awit Awards | 2022 | "Mapa (Band Version)" (with Ben&Ben) | Record of the Year | Nominated | |
| Awit Awards | 2022 | "What?" | Best Global Recording | Won | |
| Awit Awards | 2022 | "What?" | Best Music Video | Nominated | |
| Awit Awards | 2022 | "Bazinga" | Best Pop Recording | Won | |
| Awit Awards | 2022 | "Bazinga" | Best Dance Recording | Won | |
| Awit Awards | 2022 | "No Stopping You" | Best Song Written for Movie/TV/Stage Play | Nominated | |
| Awit Awards | 2022 | SB19 | Most Streamed Artist | Won | |
| Awit Awards | 2023 | "WYAT (Where You At)" | Best Performance by a Group Recording Artist | Nominated | |
| Awit Awards | 2023 | "WYAT (Where You At)" | Best Dance/Electronic Recording | Won | |
| Awit Awards | 2023 | "WYAT (Where You At)" | Music Video of the Year | Nominated | |
| Awit Awards | 2023 | "Christmas Party (SB19 Version)" | Best Christmas Recording | Nominated | |
| Awit Awards | 2024 | Pagtatag! | Album of the Year | Nominated | |
| Awit Awards | 2024 | "Gento" | Record of the Year | Nominated | |
| Awit Awards | 2024 | "Gento" | Song of the Year | Nominated | |
| Awit Awards | 2024 | "Gento" | Best Performance by a Group | Won | |
| Awit Awards | 2024 | "Gento" | Best Dance/Electronic Recording | Won | |
| Awit Awards | 2024 | "Gento" | Best Pop Recording | Nominated | |
| Awit Awards | 2024 | "Gento" | Best Music Video | Nominated | |
| Awit Awards | 2024 | "Crimzone" | Best Dance/Electronic Recording | Nominated | |
| Awit Awards | 2024 | "Liham" | Best Ballad Recording | Nominated | |
| Awit Awards | 2024 | "I Want You" | Best Music Video | Nominated | |
| Awit Awards | 2024 | "I Want You" | Best Engineering Recording | Nominated | |
| Awit Awards | 2024 | "Golden Hour (SB19 Remix)" (with Jvke) | Best Global Collaboration Recording | Nominated | |
| Awit Awards | 2025 | "Moonlight" (with Ian Asher and Terry Zhong) | Best Global Collaboration Recording | Won | |
| Awit Awards | 2025 | "Kalakal" (with Gloc-9) | Best Rap/Hip-hop Recording | Won | |
| Awit Awards | 2025 | "Kalakal" (with Gloc-9) | Music Video of the Year | Won | |
| Awit Awards | 2025 | "Kalakal" (with Gloc-9) | Best Cover Art | Won | |
| Awit Awards | 2025 | "Kalakal" (with Gloc-9) | People's Voice Award – Favorite Collaboration | Won | |
| Awit Awards | 2026 | Simula at Wakas | Album of the Year | Nominated | |
| Awit Awards | 2026 | Simula at Wakas | Best Cover Art | Nominated | |
| Awit Awards | 2026 | "Dam" | Record of the Year | Nominated | |
| Awit Awards | 2026 | "Dam" | Best Performance by a Group | Nominated | |
| Awit Awards | 2026 | "Dam" | Best Pop Recording | Nominated | |
| Awit Awards | 2026 | "Dam" | Best Music Video | Nominated | |
| Awit Awards | 2026 | "Dam" | Best Musical Arrangement | Nominated | |
| Awit Awards | 2026 | "Dungka!" | Song of the Year | Nominated | |
| Awit Awards | 2026 | "Dungka!" | Best Dance/Electronic Recording | Won | |
| Awit Awards | 2026 | "Dungka!" | Best Pop Recording | Won | |
| Awit Awards | 2026 | "Dungka!" | Best Music Video | Won | |
| Awit Awards | 2026 | "Umaaligid" (with Sarah Geronimo) | Best Collaboration Performance | Nominated | |
| Awit Awards | 2026 | "Umaaligid" (with Sarah Geronimo) | Best Dance/Electronic Recording | Nominated | |
| Awit Awards | 2026 | "8TonBall" | Best Dance/Electronic Recording | Nominated | |
| Awit Awards | 2026 | "Time" | Best Ballad Recording | Nominated | |
| Billboard Korea Power 100 | 2024 | SB19 | Voices of Asia Award | Won | |
| Billboard Music Awards | 2021 | SB19 | Top Social Artist | Nominated | |
| Box Office Entertainment Awards | 2020 | SB19 | Promising Recording/Performing Group | Won | |
| Box Office Entertainment Awards | 2024 | SB19 | Most Popular Recording/Performing Group | Won | |
| BreakTudo Awards | 2023 | SB19 | International Male Group | Won | |
| BreakTudo Awards | 2024 | SB19 | International Male Group | Won | |
| BreakTudo Awards | 2024 | "Moonlight" (with Ian Asher and Terry Zhong) | International Music Video | Nominated | |
| BreakTudo Awards | 2025 | SB19 | International Male Group | Nominated | |
| BreakTudo Awards | 2025 | "Dam" | International Video of the Year | Nominated | |
| BreakTudo Awards | 2026 | SB19 | International Male Group | Pending | |
| BreakTudo Awards | 2026 | "Emoji" (with Jolin Tsai) | International Collaboration of the Year | Pending | |
| BreakTudo Awards | 2026 | SB19 | International Fandom of the Year | Pending | |
| Dangal ng Musikang Pilipino | 2026 | SB19 | Global Impact Award | Won | |
| Filipino Music Awards | 2025 | SB19 | Artist of the Year | Won | |
| Filipino Music Awards | 2025 | Simula at Wakas | Album of the Year | Nominated | |
| Filipino Music Awards | 2025 | Simula at Wakas World Tour | Concert of the Year | Won | |
| Filipino Music Awards | 2025 | Simula at Wakas World Tour | Tour of the Year | Won | |
| Filipino Music Awards | 2025 | "Dam" | Song of the Year | Nominated | |
| Filipino Music Awards | 2025 | "Dungka!" | Pop Song of the Year | Won | |
| Filipino Music Awards | 2025 | "Umaaligid" (with Sarah Geronimo) | Pop Song of the Year | Nominated | |
| Filipino Music Awards | 2025 | SB19 | People's Choice Awards – Artist | Won | |
| Filipino Music Awards | 2025 | "Dungka!" | People's Choice Awards – Song | Won | |
| Filipino Music Awards | 2026 | SB19 | Artist of the Year | Nominated | |
| Filipino Music Awards | 2026 | Wakas at Simula | Album of the Year | Nominated | |
| Filipino Music Awards | 2026 | Wakas at Simula: The Trilogy Concert Finale | Concert of the Year | Won | |
| Filipino Music Awards | 2026 | SB19 | People's Choice Awards – Artist | Won | |
| Filipino Music Awards | 2026 | "Visa" | People's Choice Awards – Song | Won | |
| Grammy Awards | 2027 | "Visa" | Best Asian Pop Music Performance | Pending | |
| MTV Europe Music Awards | 2021 | SB19 | Best Southeast Asian Act | Nominated | |
| Music Awards Japan | 2025 | SB19 | Oshi-Katsu Request Artist of the Year | Nominated | |
| Myx Music Awards | 2020 | "Go Up" | Song of the Year | Won | |
| Myx Music Awards | 2020 | SB19 | Artist of the Year | Won | |
| Myx Music Awards | 2020 | SB19 | New Artist of the Year | Won | |
| Myx Music Awards | 2021 | SB19 | Artist of the Year | Won | |
| Myx Music Awards | 2021 | "Alab (Burning)" | Music Video of the Year | Won | |
| Myx Music Awards | 2021 | "Alab (Burning)" | Song of the Year | Won | |
| Myx Music Awards | 2024 | "Moonlight" (with Ian Asher and Terry Zhong) | Music Video of the Year | Won | |
| Myx Music Awards | 2024 | SB19 | Artist of the Year | Won | |
| NCCA Sudi National Music Awards | 2025 | SB19 | NCCA Sudi National Music Award (2022) | Won | |
| Nickelodeon Kids' Choice Awards | 2024 | SB19 | Favorite Asian Act | Won | |
| Nylon Manila Big Bold Brave Awards | 2021 | SB19 | Favorite P-pop Group | Won | |
| Nylon Manila Big Bold Brave Awards | 2021 | "What?" | Gen-Z Approved Hit | Won | |
| Nylon Manila Big Bold Brave Awards | 2022 | SB19 | Favorite P-pop Group | Won | |
| Nylon Manila Big Bold Brave Awards | 2022 | "Bazinga" | Gen-Z Approved Hit | Won | |
| Nylon Manila Big Bold Brave Awards | 2023 | SB19 | Favorite P-pop Group | Won | |
| Nylon Manila Big Bold Brave Awards | 2023 | "WYAT (Where You At)" | Gen-Z Approved Hit | Won | |
| Nylon Manila Big Bold Brave Awards | 2024 | SB19 | Favorite P-pop Group | Nominated | |
| Nylon Manila Big Bold Brave Awards | 2024 | SB19 | Favorite Pop Culture Moment | Won | |
| Nylon Manila Big Bold Brave Awards | 2024 | "Gento" | Gen-Z Approved Hit | Won | |
| P-pop Music Awards | 2022 | SB19 | Philippine Pop Boy Group of the Year | Won | |
| P-pop Music Awards | 2022 | SB19 | Philippine Pop Icon of the Year | Won | |
| P-pop Music Awards | 2022 | "WYAT (Where You At)" | Philippine Pop Song of the Year | Won | |
| P-pop Music Awards | 2022 | SB19 | Philippine Pop Fandom of the Year | Won | |
| P-pop Music Awards | 2022 | SB19 | Philippine Pop Live Performer of the Year | Nominated | |
| P-pop Music Awards | 2023 | SB19 | Philippine Pop Boy Group of the Year | Nominated | |
| P-pop Music Awards | 2023 | SB19 | Philippine Pop Top Global Artist of the Year | Won | |
| P-pop Music Awards | 2023 | "Gento" | Philippine Pop Video of the Year | Won | |
| P-pop Music Awards | 2023 | "Gento" | Philippine Pop Song of the Year | Won | |
| P-pop Music Awards | 2023 | Pagtatag! | Philippine Pop Album of the Year | Won | |
| P-pop Music Awards | 2024 | "Moonlight" (with Ian Asher and Terry Zhong) | Song of the Year | Nominated | |
| P-pop Music Awards | 2024 | "Kalakal" (with Gloc-9) | Collaboration of the Year | Nominated | |
| P-pop Music Awards | 2024 | Pagtatag! World Tour | Concert of the Year | Nominated | |
| P-pop Music Awards | 2024 | SB19 | P-pop Icon | Won | |
| P-pop Music Awards | 2025 | SB19 | Artist of the Year | Won | |
| P-pop Music Awards | 2025 | "Dungka!" | Song of the Year | Won | |
| P-pop Music Awards | 2025 | "Dam" | Song of the Year | Nominated | |
| P-pop Music Awards | 2025 | Simula at Wakas | Album of the Year | Won | |
| P-pop Music Awards | 2025 | "Dam" | Music Video of the Year | Won | |
| P-pop Music Awards | 2025 | Simula at Wakas World Tour | Concert of the Year | Won | |
| P-pop Music Awards | 2025 | "Umaaligid" (with Sarah Geronimo) | Collaboration of the Year | Won | |
| P-pop Music Awards | 2025 | "Ating Pasko" (with G22) | Collaboration of the Year | Nominated | |
| P-pop Music Awards | 2025 | "Dungka!" | Best Choreography in a Live Performance | Won | |
| P-pop Music Awards | 2025 | SB19 | P-pop Favorite Fandom of the Year | Won | |
| P-pop Music Awards | 2025 | SB19 | P-pop Favorite Group of the Year | Won | |
| P-pop Music Awards | 2026 | SB19 | Artist of the Year | Nominated | |
| P-pop Music Awards | 2026 | "Visa" | Song of the Year | Nominated | |
| P-pop Music Awards | 2026 | "Lawless" | Song of the Year | Nominated | |
| P-pop Music Awards | 2026 | "Lawless" | Production Design in a Music Video | Won | |
| P-pop Music Awards | 2026 | "Lawless" | Choreography in a Video Performance | Nominated | |
| P-pop Music Awards | 2026 | "Toyfriend" (with Be:First) | Collaboration of the Year | Won | |
| P-pop Music Awards | 2026 | SB19 | Fandom of the Year | Won | |
| PMPC Star Awards for Music | 2020 | SB19 | New Group Artist of the Year | Nominated | |
| PMPC Star Awards for Music | 2021 | SB19 | Duo/Group Artist of the Year | Nominated | |
| PMPC Star Awards for Music | 2022 | "Alab (Burning)" | Music Video of the Year | Nominated | |
| PMPC Star Awards for Music | 2022 | SB19 | International Chartbusting Award | Won | |
| PMPC Star Awards for Music | 2024 (1) | Pagsibol | Album of the Year | Won | |
| PMPC Star Awards for Music | 2024 (1) | "Mapa" | Song of the Year | Won | |
| PMPC Star Awards for Music | 2024 (1) | SB19 | Duo/Group Artist of the Year | Won | |
| PMPC Star Awards for Music | 2024 (1) | Our Zone: SB19 Third Anniversary Concert | Duo/Group Concert of the Year | Won | |
| PMPC Star Awards for Music | 2024 (1) | Pagsibol | Pop Album of the Year | Won | |
| PMPC Star Awards for Music | 2024 (1) | "Bazinga" | Dance Recording of the Year | Won | |
| PMPC Star Awards for Music | 2024 (1) | "Bazinga" | Music Video of the Year | Won | |
| PMPC Star Awards for Music | 2024 (2) | WYAT (Where You At) Tour | Concert of the Year | Nominated | |
| PMPC Star Awards for Music | 2024 (2) | SB19 | Duo/Group Concert Performer of the Year | Nominated | |
| PMPC Star Awards for Music | 2024 (2) | "WYAT (Where You At)" | Music Video of the Year | Won | |
| PMPC Star Awards for Music | 2024 (3) | "Gento" | Song of the Year | Won | |
| PMPC Star Awards for Music | 2024 (3) | Pagtatag! | Album of the Year | Won | |
| PMPC Star Awards for Music | 2024 (3) | SB19 | Duo/Group Artist of the Year | Nominated | |
| PMPC Star Awards for Music | 2024 (3) | "Gento" | Dance Recording of the Year | Won | |
| PMPC Star Awards for Music | 2024 (3) | SB19 | Duo/Group Concert Performer of the Year | Won | |
| PMPC Star Awards for Music | 2026 | SB19 | Duo/Group Artist of the Year | Nominated | |
| PMPC Star Awards for Music | 2026 | Pagtatag! World Tour | Concert of the Year | Won | |
| PMPC Star Awards for Music | 2026 | SB19 | Duo/Group Concert Performer of the Year | Won | |
| PMPC Star Awards for Music | 2026 | "Kalakal" (with Gloc-9) | Music Video of the Year | Won | |
| PMPC Star Awards for Music | 2026 | "Kalakal" (with Gloc-9) | Collaboration of the Year | Nominated | |
| TikTok Awards Philippines | 2021 | SB19 | Top Celebrity Award | Won | |
| TikTok Awards Philippines | 2022 | SB19 | P-pop Group of the Year | Won | |
| TikTok Awards Philippines | 2023 | "Gento" | Song of the Year | Won | |
| Wish 107.5 Music Awards | 2020 | "Go Up" | Wishclusive Pop Performance of the Year | Won | |
| Wish 107.5 Music Awards | 2020 | SB19 | Wish Breakthrough Artist of the Year | Won | |
| Wish 107.5 Music Awards | 2020 | SB19 | Wishers' Choice Award | Won | |
| Wish 107.5 Music Awards | 2021 | "Alab (Burning)" | Wishclusive Pop Performance of the Year | Nominated | |
| Wish 107.5 Music Awards | 2021 | "Love Goes" | Wish Pop Song of the Year | Won | |
| Wish 107.5 Music Awards | 2021 | SB19 | Wish Group of the Year | Won | |
| Wish 107.5 Music Awards | 2021 | SB19 | Wishers' Choice Award | Won | |
| Wish 107.5 Music Awards | 2022 | "Ikako" | Wishclusive Pop Performance of the Year | Won | |
| Wish 107.5 Music Awards | 2022 | "Hanggang sa Huli" | Wishclusive Ballad Performance of the Year | Won | |
| Wish 107.5 Music Awards | 2022 | "What?" | Wish Pop Song of the Year | Won | |
| Wish 107.5 Music Awards | 2022 | SB19 | Wish Group of the Year | Won | |
| Wish 107.5 Music Awards | 2022 | SB19 | Wishers' Choice Award | Won | |
| Wish 107.5 Music Awards | 2023 | "Bazinga" | Wishclusive Pop Performance of the Year | Won | |
| Wish 107.5 Music Awards | 2023 | "WYAT (Where You At)" | Wish Pop Song of the Year | Won | |
| Wish 107.5 Music Awards | 2023 | SB19 | Wish Group of the Year | Won | |
| Wish 107.5 Music Awards | 2023 | SB19 | Wishers' Choice Award | Won | |
| Wish 107.5 Music Awards | 2024 | "Gento" | Wishclusive Pop Performance of the Year | Won | |
| Wish 107.5 Music Awards | 2024 | "I Want You" | Wishclusive R&B Performance of the Year | Won | |
| Wish 107.5 Music Awards | 2024 | "Ilaw" | Wish Ballad Song of the Year | Nominated | |
| Wish 107.5 Music Awards | 2024 | SB19 | Wish Group of the Year | Won | |
| Wish 107.5 Music Awards | 2025 | "Ilaw" | Wishclusive Ballad Performance of the Year | Won | |
| Wish 107.5 Music Awards | 2025 | "Kalakal" (with Gloc-9) | Wish Song Collaboration of the Year | Won | |
| Wish 107.5 Music Awards | 2025 | SB19 | Wish Group of the Year | Nominated | |
| Wish 107.5 Music Awards | 2026 | "Dam" | Wishclusive Pop Performance of the Year | Won | |
| Wish 107.5 Music Awards | 2026 | "Time" | Wishclusive Ballad Performance of the Year | Won | |
| Wish 107.5 Music Awards | 2026 | "Dungka!" | Wish Pop Song of the Year | Won | |
| Wish 107.5 Music Awards | 2026 | "Umaaligid" (with Sarah Geronimo) | Wish Song Collaboration of the Year | Won | |
| Wish 107.5 Music Awards | 2026 | SB19 | Wish Group of the Year | Nominated | |
| Wish 107.5 Music Awards | 2026 | SB19 | Wishers' Choice Award | Won | |

== Other accolades ==
=== State honors ===
List of state honors received by SB19
| Country | Year | Organization | Honor | Ref. |
|---|---|---|---|---|
| Philippines | 2021 | National Commission for Culture and the Arts | Youth Ambassador | |
| Philippines | 2021 | National Commission for Culture and the Arts | Sentro Rizal Ambassador | |
| Philippines | 2025 | House of Representatives of the Philippines | House Resolution No. 2341 (Note: House Resolution No. 2341 full title: "A Resolution Congratulating and Commending the Filipino Pop Groups SB19, Bini, and BGYO for Their Victories at the 2024 BreakTudo Awards in Brazil, and for Bringing Honor and Recognition to the Philippines Through Their Outstanding Contributions to the International Music Industry") | |
| Philippines | 2026 | Senate of the Philippines | Senate Resolutions No. 545 and 573 | |
| Philippines | 2026 | House of Representatives of the Philippines | House Resolution No. 1280 | |
| Philippines | 2026 | Department of Tourism | Official Tourism Ambassadors | |

=== Listicles ===
List of listicles featuring SB19
| Publisher | Year(s) | Listicle | Placement | Ref. |
|---|---|---|---|---|
| Billboard Philippines | 2023 | The Top 25 Filipino Songs | Placed ("I Want You") | |
| Billboard Philippines | 2023 | The Top 10 Music Videos | Placed ("Gento") | |
| Billboard Philippines | 2024 | The 50 Best Music Videos | Placed ("Kalakal") | |
| Billboard Philippines | 2025 | 12 of the Best OPM Christmas Songs of All Time | Placed ("Ligaya") | |
| Billboard Philippines | 2025 | 25 Best Filipino Albums and EPs | Placed (Simula at Wakas) | |
| Billboard Philippines | 2025 | 25 Best Filipino Songs | Placed ("Umaaligid") | |
| Billboard Philippines | 2025 | 25 Best Filipino Songs | Placed ("Dungka!") | |
| CNN Philippines | 2023 | The 24 Best Filipino Songs | Placed ("Gento") | |
| Esquire Philippines | 2022 | The 100 Most Powerful People in the Philippines | Placed | |
| Esquire Philippines | 2023 | The 16 Best OPM Albums and EPs | 9th (Pagtatag!) | |
| Philippine Entertainment Portal | 2024 | Most Influential in Entertainment | Placed | |
| Preview | 2022 | 50 Most Influential | Placed | |
| SunStar Davao | 2023 | The Best OPM Albums | 2nd (Pagtatag!) | |
| Teen Vogue | 2022 | 33 Best Boy Bands of All Time | Placed | |
