= Pagtatag! =

EP by SB19
- Released: June 9, 2023
- Genre: Pop; EDM; hip hop; soul; R&B
- Length: 26:11
- Language: English; Tagalog; Cebuano
- Label: Sony Music Philippines
- Producer: John Paulo Nase; Joshua Daniel Nase; Simon Servida; August Rigo; Brian Lotho; Len Calvo; Ohwon Lee

SB19 chronology
Pagsibol (2021)	Pagtatag! (2023)	Simula at Wakas (2025)

Singles from Pagtatag!
- 1. "Gento" Released: May 19, 2023

Pagtatag! (stylized in all uppercase; transl. strengthening) is the second extended play (EP) recorded by the Filipino boy band SB19. Sony Music Philippines released it on June 9, 2023. The EP includes songs all co-written by the band's leader Pablo, which incorporated musical styles such as pop, EDM, hip hop, soul, and R&B, as part of the band's desire to explore genres since their departure from the dance-pop music in their debut album, Get in the Zone (2020). Pablo and his brother Joshua Daniel Nase produced Pagtatag! along with Simon Servida, August Rigo, Brian Lotho, Len Calvo, and Ohwon Lee.

Development of Pagtatag! began in 2022 while SB19 embarked on their first world tour and continued after they left the talent agency ShowBT to pursue self-management. The EP is the second installment in a trilogy that began with Pagsibol (2021). SB19 themed Pagtatag! around "identity strengthening" and its songs explore topics of empowerment, commitment, love, mental health, and liberation, some of which were inspired by the band's struggles. "Gento" was released as the EP's lead single to critical acclaim and commercial success, reaching top 15 chart positions in the Philippines and on Billboard's World Digital Song Sales chart.

Pagtatag! received generally favorable reviews from music critics with praise for the EP's musicality and lyricism. To support the EP, SB19 performed its tracks during television and public appearances in the Philippines and in the United States and embarked on its supporting tour, the Pagtatag! World Tour (2023–2024). Pagtatag! was featured on 2023 year-end rankings and has been nominated for Album of the Year at the 2024 Awit Awards; several of its songs also received nominations from local award-giving bodies.

== Background and development ==
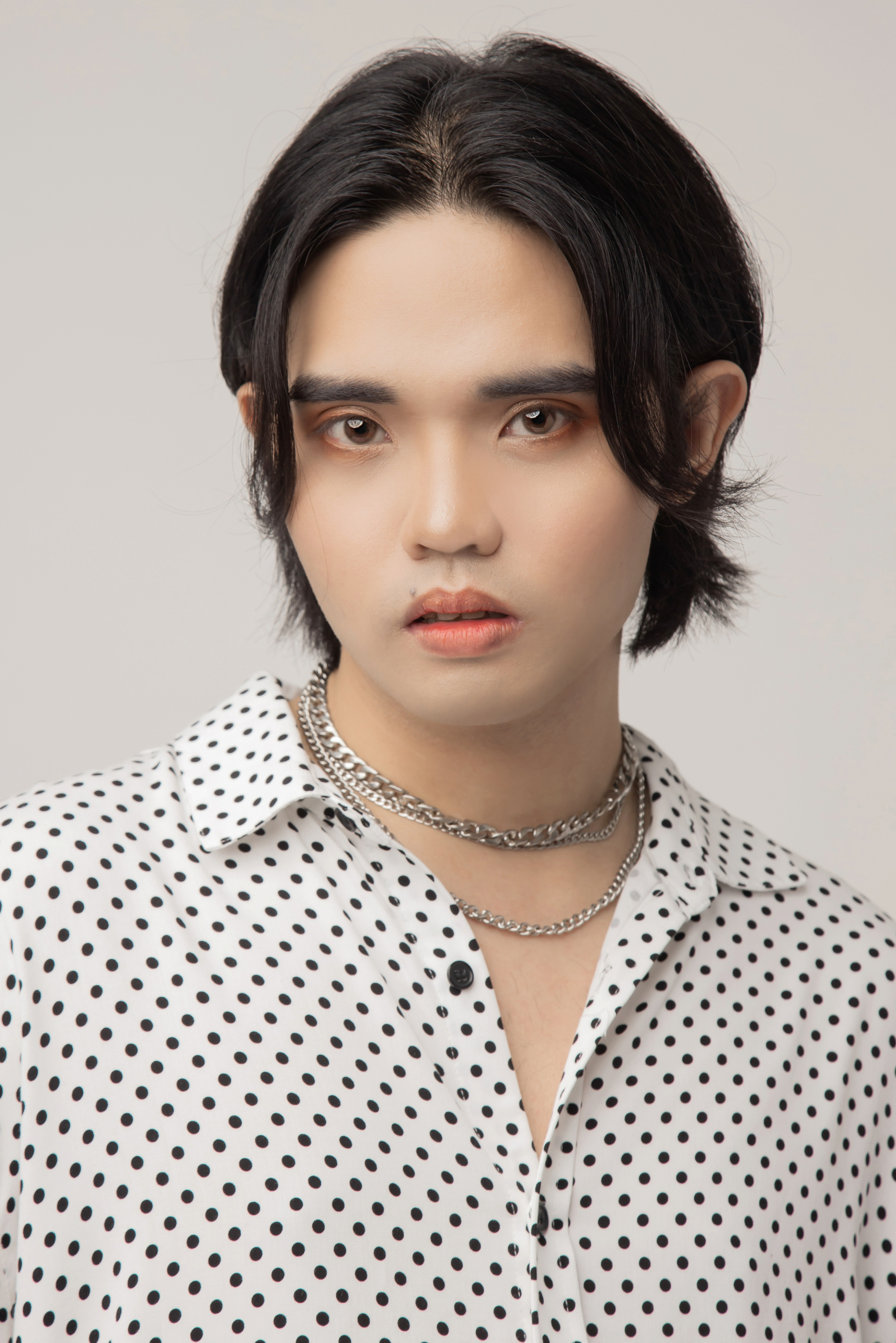
SB19's leader, Pablo (pictured), co-wrote all the songs on Pagtatag!

The Filipino boy band SB19 was formed by a local subsidiary of the South Korean entertainment company ShowBT in 2016 through a talent search. They released three singles—"Tilaluha", "Go Up", and "Alab (Burning)"—from 2018 to 2019, which were all included in their debut studio album, Get in the Zone (2020), a dance-pop album. ShowBT influenced the creative process of their releases up to the album. In 2021, the group began gaining creative control of their work, starting with the release of their first extended play (EP), Pagsibol, which they themed around artistic origins and growth. SB19 worked with a few other record producers, including Pablo's brother, Joshua Daniel Nase, and Simon Servida. They explored different genres for the EP—such as pop rock, hip hop, and EDM—departing from the dance-pop production of their debut album. The EP's single, "Bazinga", was once among the most talked-about songs on Twitter, topping Billboard's Hot Trending Songs Powered by Twitter chart for seven weeks.

Later on, SB19 released three standalone singles—"Ligaya" (2021), "WYAT (Where You At)" (2022), and "Nyebe" (2022)—and embarked on their first world tour with the WYAT (Where You At) Tour in 2022. Amidst touring, the band said in an interview with CNN Philippines that they were working on a new music release and preparing for another concert tour in 2023. They later confirmed in a press conference that their upcoming release would be based on the word "pagtatag" (transl. strengthening), and that they would continue to explore different genres and life experiences, with inspirations drawing from their shortcomings, frustrations, and identity. The group's leader, Pablo, revealed in an interview with Zach Sang that Pagsibol and their forthcoming releases would be part of a trilogy. Conceptually, the trilogy would focus on the evolution of the band's artistry—from discovering their origins in Pagsibol to strengthening their perceived identity in Pagtatag!. SB19 left ShowBT Entertainment and pursued self-management by establishing their own talent agency, 1Z Entertainment. It would be the band's first release to have complete control of, from its development leading up to its release, to which they responded happily: "And now that we have the full control, the full capacity... we can freely express and maximize what we've been doing before".

In December 2022, SB19 recorded a cover version of Eraserheads' "Christmas Party" to celebrate Eraserheads' reunion concert, Huling El Bimbo. SB19 worked with the songwriter and record producer August Rigo for the record, where Rigo acknowledged the possibility of them working together in the future. On April 29, 2023, the band posted a trailer on YouTube that announced their second EP, Pagtatag!, would be released on June 9. Aside from the EP release, the trailer also indicated that it would be preceded by an untitled single and that the group would embark on a world tour. They later confirmed the single's title on May 10, 2023, and announced the EP's tracklist, songwriters, and producers on May 31, 2024.

== Music and lyrics ==
Pagtatag! consists of six tracks spanning 26 minutes and 11 seconds. The band's leader, Pablo, co-wrote all the songs on the EP; he wrote "Gento", "Ilaw", and "Liham" alone, and, for others, he collaborated with co-writers August Rigo (for "I Want You"), his brother Joshua Daniel Nase ("Crimzone", "Freedom"), and band members Ken and Josh ("Crimzone"). Most of the EP was produced by Pablo and Joshua Daniel Nase; they also collaborated with Simon Servida, Brian Lotho, Len Calvo, and Ohwon Lee in its production. The majority of the EP's lyrics were written in English and Tagalog, while its third track, "Crimzone", contains lyrics in Cebuano. SB19 put the EP together as a collection of songs discerning the boy band's identity, disregarding the trends, standards, and demographic preferences in the music industry, and instead, went for a shared creative process in which sounds and music genres the group wanted to include in the record.

The EP's opening track, "Gento", is a pop and hip hop song with claps, strong bass beats, and EDM break accompaniments. An empowerment anthem, the song uses gold mining as a metaphor for how success is as rigorous as excavating gold, alluding to the group's story and career, and suggests taking tasks incrementally to achieve one's goals. Critics praised its lyricism, finding it catchy and interesting. (Note: Attributed to multiple references:) "I Want You" is a sensually-themed song that talks about someone's desire for a person against a slow soul R&B production reminiscent of 1990s music. (Note: Attributed to multiple references:) Critics find that the band's vocals well suited to the genre. Pablo wanted to advocate for people to work hard for their dreams with the song "Crimzone". It is a reggaeton-influenced EDM pop track accompanied by hard-hitting beats and "adrenaline-activat[ing]" production, with lyrics that reflect the boy band's struggles and triumphs.

"Liham"
Billboard Philippines highlights the vocal "imperfections" in the EP's ballads; the fifth track, "Liham", includes gasping and sobbing in the bridge and transitions to the final chorus by belting, which they opined complemented the song's emotions.

"Ilaw" (lit. 'light') is an emotional ballad, driven by acoustic guitar and includes a bridge that was belted. The song discusses vulnerability and the need for self-care through metaphors of blinding lights, especially when feeling overwhelmed. "Liham" (lit. 'letter') is a power ballad love song, led by strings and piano. SB19 had akin the song to a wedding vow, where they narrate someone's relationship, for which they had expressed love, devotion, and gratitude towards the other person. The EP's closing track, "Freedom", is dedicated to their fans. It is an upbeat pop song with lyrics about escaping from struggles and challenges and celebrating one's achievements with people who helped along the way.

== Release and promotion ==
Sony Music Philippines released Pagtatag! on June 9, 2023, through digital download and streaming formats. Its opening track, "Gento", was released ahead of the EP as its lead single on May 19, 2023, and was a commercial success for the band. The single entered two Billboard charts: the World Digital Song Sales and the Philippines Songs charts, peaking at numbers eight and eleven, respectively. It marked SB19's first entry to both charts and became the first entry among Filipino groups on the former. The single also became the subject of a dance challenge that trended on the video-sharing service TikTok, which accumulated over 1.7 million user-generated videos using the song on the platform.

Three songs from the EP—"Gento", "I Want You", and "Freedom"—were accompanied by music videos that were released to YouTube on May 19, June 9, and October 28, 2023, respectively. The music video for "Gento", directed by Kerbs Balagtas, is grunge-themed and depicts the boy band mining for gold and dancing in a large quarry. Jed Regala directed the "I Want You" video, which was "sultry-themed" with clips showing the group drenched and underwater. The video for "Freedom" premiered at the Our Zone fifth-anniversary fan meeting, showing the group wandering in outdoor spaces.

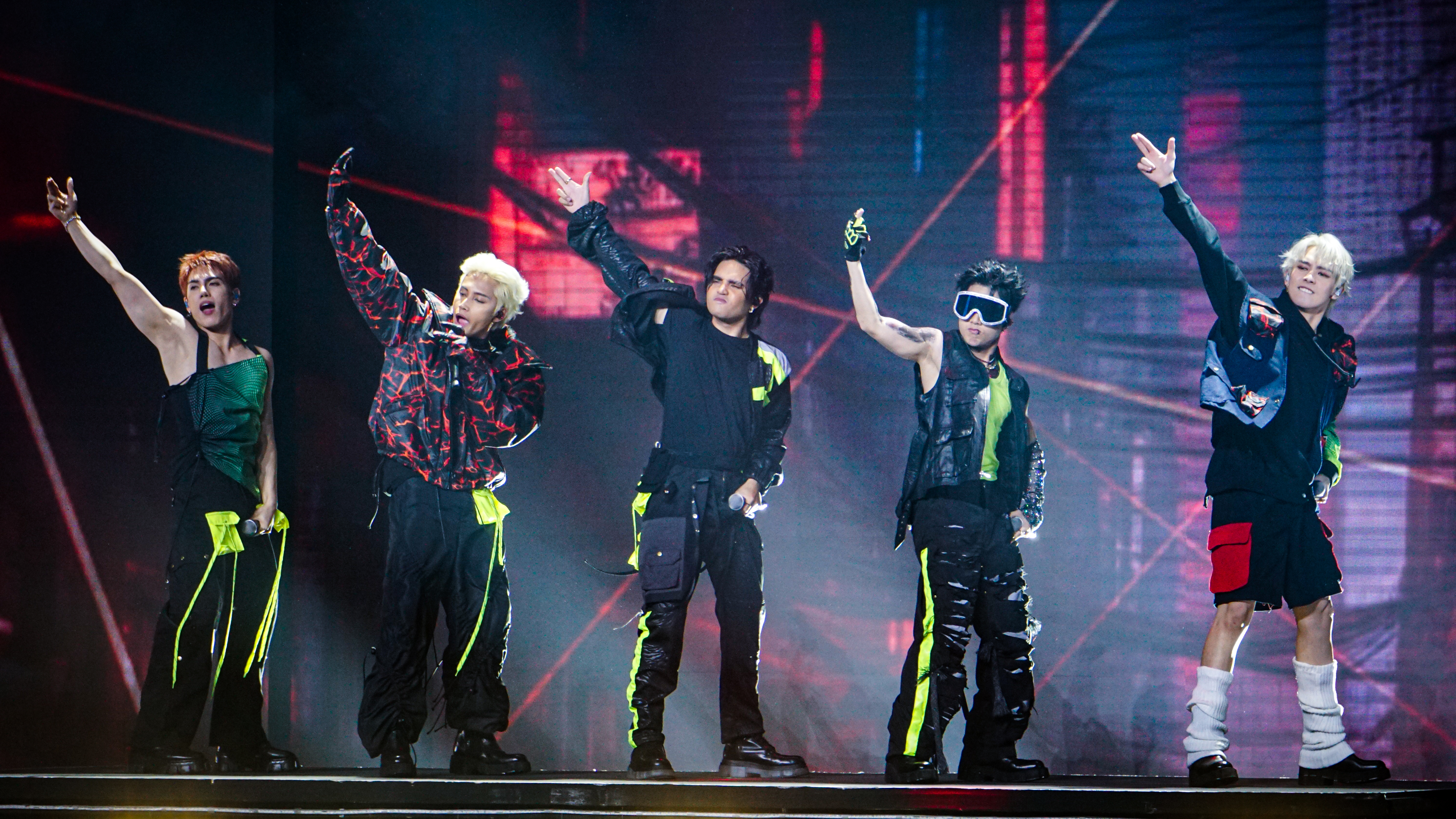
SB19 performing "Crimzone" at the Pagtatag! World Tour (2023)

To support Pagtatag!, SB19 embarked on their second world tour with the Pagtatag! World Tour. Running 18 shows from June 2023 to May 2024, it began and concluded in Quezon City and visited countries including the United States, Canada, the United Arab Emirates, and Japan. (Note: Attributed to multiple references:) Aside from touring, the boy band also made television and public appearances to promote the EP, with various live performances of songs from its track list. They first performed the EP's first two tracks, "Gento" and "I Want You", on the noontime variety shows All-Out Sundays and ASAP Natin 'To on May 21 and June 11, 2023, respectively. In the United States, the group put on street performances of songs from the EP on Hollywood Boulevard and at Times Square. They also performed "Gento" during their appearances on two U.S. television shows—KTLA 5 Morning News on August 2, 2023, and Good Day New York on August 9, 2023. SB19 recorded live performance renditions of "Gento" and "I Want You", which were released via Vevo. At the Asia Artist Awards 2023—where SB19 was honored with the Best Artist (Singer) award—they performed "Gento" and "Crimzone" as part of a medley of their songs.

== Critical reception ==
Pagtatag! received generally favorable reviews from music critics. A few critics considered the release a significant one; Rafael Bautista of Nylon Manila regarded the gap since Pagsibol as worth the wait, while Bulatlat's Janness Ann Ellao found the release proof that the "P-pop movement only seems to grow". Critics also complimented the band's vocals and the EP's theme, musicality, and lyricism. Nylon Manila's Acer Batislaong labelled the songs as "bangers", and Gabriel Saulog from Billboard Philippines described the EP as a "masterclass in confidence and versatility", praising the lyricism in "Gento" and "I Want You", which he respectively considered "catchy" and "snappy". Many critics reacted positively to the band exploring different genres, including Saulog, who opined that he sees the potential of the group exploring more in their future projects, and for the ballads' conception, which he believed showed vulnerability and went beyond the band's public image. A separate review published by Billboard Philippines described it as a "great EP", complimenting its songwriting, particularly how the songs feature multilinguistic lyrics, including Cebuano, which they opined added "a new dimension" to the group. Billboard Philippines also commented that raw emotions emerged from the vocals in the EP's ballads, particularly the embellished vocal "imperfections". Nonetheless, they thought the EP ended weak, criticizing the EP's closing song, "Freedom", because of its rap sections feeling "out of place and forced into the track" and its instrumentals "cluttered". Nonetheless, Esquire Philippines and SunStar Davao listed Pagtatag! in their lists of best Filipino albums of 2023, all ranking the EP within the top 10, applauding its quality, songwriting, and cultural impact.

== Accolades ==
Pagtatag! won the Philippine Pop Album of the Year award at the 2023 P-pop Music Awards. The EP was also nominated for Album of the Year at the 2024 Awit Awards, where several of the EP's songs also contributed to SB19's nominations for 15 other awards, including the Record of the Year award for "Gento". At the 16th PMPC Star Awards for Music, the EP won the Album of the Year, and its lead single "Gento" also won awards for Song of the Year and Dance Recording of the Year categories. The single was also awarded Song of the Year at the 2023 TikTok Philippines Awards, Gen-Z Approved Hit at the 2024 Nylon Manila Big Bold Brave Awards, and Wishclusive Pop Performance of the Year at the 2024 Wish 107.5 Music Awards. "I Want You" and "Ilaw" also earned nominations at the latter for the Wishclusive R&B Performance of the Year and Wish Ballad of the Year, respectively, with "I Want You" winning the award.

Awards and nominations for Pagtatag!
Award	Year	Category	Result	Ref(s).
Awit Awards	2024	Album of the Year	Nominated	
P-pop Music Awards	2023	Philippine Pop Album of the Year	Won	
PMPC Star Awards for Music	2024	Album of the Year	Won	

== Track listing ==
Pagtatag! track listing
No.	Title	Writer(s)	Producer(s)	Length
1.	"Gento"	John Paulo Nase	J.P. Nase; Joshua Daniel Nase; Simon Servida	3:52
2.	"I Want You"	August Rigo; J.P. Nase	Rigo	3:43
3.	"Crimzone"	J.P. Nase; J.D. Nase; Felip Jhon Suson; Josh Cullen Santos	Servida	3:49
4.	"Ilaw"	J.P. Nase	Brian Lotho; Len Calvo; J.P. Nase; J.D. Nase	4:52
5.	"Liham"	J.P. Nase	Lotho; Calvo; J.P. Nase; J.D. Nase	6:24
6.	"Freedom"	J.P. Nase; J.D. Nase	Ohwon Lee	3:31
Total length:				26:11

Note

- All track titles are stylized in all uppercase.

== Credits and personnel ==
Credits are adapted from Tidal and music videos. (Note: Attributed to multiple references:)

Musicians

- SB19 – lead vocals
- John Paulo Nase – songwriting, production (tracks 1, 4, 5)
- Joshua Daniel Nase – production (1, 4, 5), songwriting (3, 6)
- Simon Servida – production (1, 3)
- Brian Lotho – production (4, 5)
- Len Calvo – production (4, 5)
- August Rigo – songwriting (2), production (2)
- Felip Jhon Suson – songwriting (3)
- Josh Cullen Santos – songwriting (3)
- Ohwon Lee – production (6)

Technical

- Heo Chan-goo – mixing (1, 2, 6), mastering (1, 2, 6)
- Ohwon Lee – mixing assistance (1, 2, 6), mastering assistance (1, 2, 6)
