= Gento (song) =

Single by SB19

from the EP Pagtatag!
- Language: English; Tagalog
- Released: May 19, 2023
- Genre: Pop; hip-hop
- Length: 3:52
- Label: Sony Philippines
- Songwriter: John Paulo Nase
- Producers: John Paulo Nase; Joshua Daniel Nase; Simon Servida

SB19 singles chronology
"Nyebe" (2022)	"Gento" (2023)	"Moonlight" (2024)

Music video
- "Gento" on YouTube

"Gento" (stylized in all uppercase) is a song recorded by the Filipino boy band SB19 for their second extended play (EP), Pagtatag! (2023). The band's leader, Pablo, wrote the song and co-produced it with Joshua Daniel Nase and Simon Servida. A pop and hip-hop track, it is about empowerment and uses gold mining as a metaphor for achieving success, alluding to the band's career. The song was released via Sony Music Philippines on May 19, 2023, as the EP's lead single.

Most reviews from music critics favored the single's catchy lyricism, but its monotonous composition was subject to criticism. The song was SB19's first entry on two of Billboard's record charts: World Digital Song Sales—a first among Filipino groups—and the Philippines Songs charts, peaking at numbers eight and eleven, respectively. A dance challenge set to the song became a trend on TikTok. The accompanying music video, directed by Kerbs Balagtas, depicted the band members mining for gold. The group promoted the song with live performances and included it on the set list of their Pagtatag! World Tour (2023–2024). The song has received multiple accolades, including Best Dance/Electronic Recording at the 2024 Awit Awards.

== Background and release ==
In late 2022, the Filipino boy band SB19 embarked on their first world tour with the WYAT (Where You At) Tour. While touring, the band said in an interview with CNN Philippines that the group is working on a new music release planned for 2023. In a later press conference, the band's leader, Pablo, revealed that the group's forthcoming music release would be based on the word pagtatag (lit. 'establishment'). Other members added that they would explore different music genres and life experiences.

On April 29, 2023, SB19 posted a trailer on YouTube for their second extended play (EP), Pagtatag!, and announced it would be released on June 9. It marked the band's first new musical release since Pagsibol (2021). The trailer also indicated that the EP would be preceded by a single, which was untitled at the time. The group revealed the title of the EP's lead single, "Gento", on May 10, and made it available for pre-save on digital streaming platforms. Sony Music Philippines released "Gento" on May 19; a live recording of the song during SB19's appearance on the First Take was released to streaming platforms on August 16, 2024.

== Composition and lyrics ==
"Gento" is three minutes and 52 seconds long. Pablo wrote the song, and collaborated with his brother Joshua Daniel Nase and the record producer Simon Servida for the production. Servida had previously worked with the band for Pagsibol. Heo Chan-goo of Knob Sound Korea mixed and mastered the song.

"Gento"
A 23-second sample of the song's chorus, which features strong bass beats and the use of word playing.

Musically, "Gento" is a blend of pop and hip-hop, accompanied by an EDM break; some journalists described the song as an EDM pop track. The song features clapping sounds and strong bass beats in its production. The lyrics—themed around empowerment—draw inspiration from "transformational change", which allude to SB19's career. It includes a message about becoming successful by committing to small and incremental tasks, comparing it to the process of mining and refining gold; particularly regarding how success is as rigorous as excavating it: "Di ka basta-basta makakakita ng gento" (lit. 'You just won't simply find something like this'). The lyrics incorporate wordplay, combining the words "ginto" (lit. 'gold') and "ganito" (lit. 'like this'), creating the word "gento" (also in Chavacano; lit. 'like this'), which is utilized along with other similar words in the chorus.

== Reception ==
The song was met with generally favorable reviews from music critics. Upon its release, "Gento" was described as catchy, particularly its wordplay; Rafael Bautista of Nylon Manila added that the song delivered an empowering message while being playful. He also remarked positively on the song's lyricism and the use of rhyming words: "[...] effortlessly weaving 'ganito', 'ginto', 'bento', and 'gento' into the lyrics". The Daily Tribune noted that the song highlights SB19's strength and versatility, and that they continued to "test—and break—the limits with their unconventional sound and unbounded talent". Writing for Mega magazine, Chlarine Gianan praised the boy band's vocals and rap, stating that they have put it on the "next level", and that the song's lyricism manifests seamless transitions between English and Tagalog, further holding up its catchiness and appeal. Gabriel Saulog of Billboard Philippines praised the group's "confident delivery" and opined that "Gento" creates impact as Pagtatag!'s opening track. In a separate review, Billboard Philippines ranked "Gento" as one of the top songs off of SB19's discography, labelling it "more interesting and cohesive" than their previous works. However, it was criticized for its unvarying energy throughout the song, making it appear "one-note". Nevertheless, "Gento" was included on CNN Philippines's list of best Filipino songs of 2023.

Commercially, "Gento" was SB19's debut on two of Billboard's music charts; its commercial performance was considered by the Inquirer's Allan Policarpio a "resounding success" for the group. "Gento" debuted and peaked at number eight on the World Digital Song Sales chart dated June 3, 2023, and debuted at number 17 on the Philippines Songs chart dated June 17, 2023. For earning a spot on the former, it made the band the first Filipino group to do so. The song peaked at number 11 on the Philippines Songs chart issued on June 24, 2023. "Gento" amassed over 30 million combined streams on Spotify and music video views on YouTube in the song's first two months since its release.

== Accolades ==
"Gento" has received multiple awards from different award-giving bodies. At the 2023 TikTok Awards Philippines, the single won the award for the Song of the Year category. Sony Music Philippines sent the song as an entry for the Best Pop Duo/Group Performance award at the 66th Grammy Awards; however, it fell short of a nomination. In 2024, the song won the Wishclusive Pop Performance of the Year award at the 2024 Wish 107.5 Music Awards and the Gen-Z Approved Hit award at the 2024 Nylon Manila Big Bold Brave Awards. At the 2024 Awit Awards, "Gento" was nominated in seven categories: Record of the Year, Song of the Year, Best Performance by a Group, Best Pop Recording, Best Musical Arrangement, Music Video of the Year, and Best Dance/Electronic Recording, winning two. At the 16th PMPC Star Awards for Music, the single won two nominations for Song of the Year and Dance Recording of the Year.

Awards and nominations for "Gento"
Award	Year	Category	Result	Ref.
Awit Awards	2024	Record of the Year	Nominated	
Awit Awards	2024	Song of the Year	Nominated	
Awit Awards	2024	Best Performance by a Group	Won	
Awit Awards	2024	Best Pop Recording	Nominated	
Awit Awards	2024	Best Musical Arrangement	Nominated	
Awit Awards	2024	Music Video of the Year	Nominated	
Awit Awards	2024	Best Dance/Electronic Recording	Won	
Nylon Manila Big Bold Brave Awards	2024	Gen-Z Approved Hit	Won	
P-pop Music Awards	2023	Philippine Pop Video of the Year	Won	
P-pop Music Awards	2023	Philippine Pop Song of the Year	Won	
PMPC Star Awards for Music	2024	Song of the Year	Won	
PMPC Star Awards for Music	2024	Dance Recording of the Year	Won	
TikTok Awards Philippines	2023	Song of the Year	Won	
Wish 107.5 Music Awards	2024	Wishclusive Pop Performance of the Year	Won	

== Promotion ==
The music video for "Gento", directed by Kerbs Balagtas, was released on May 19, 2023, on YouTube, the same day as the song's release. Characterized by its grungy motif, it depicts the group members looking for gold and dancing in a large quarry. Jay Joseph Roncesvalles conceived the choreography for the video. SB19 worked with the stylist duo Rainer Dagala and Em Millan and the designers Neric Beltran and Renan Pacson to create custom looks in the video that resemble miners. Pacson spoke with the Manila Bulletin and mentioned taking inspiration from traditional Levi's clothing—citing the brand's mining history as a factor—and the use of artificial intelligence in designing the looks for the video. They released a live performance video of the song via Vevo.

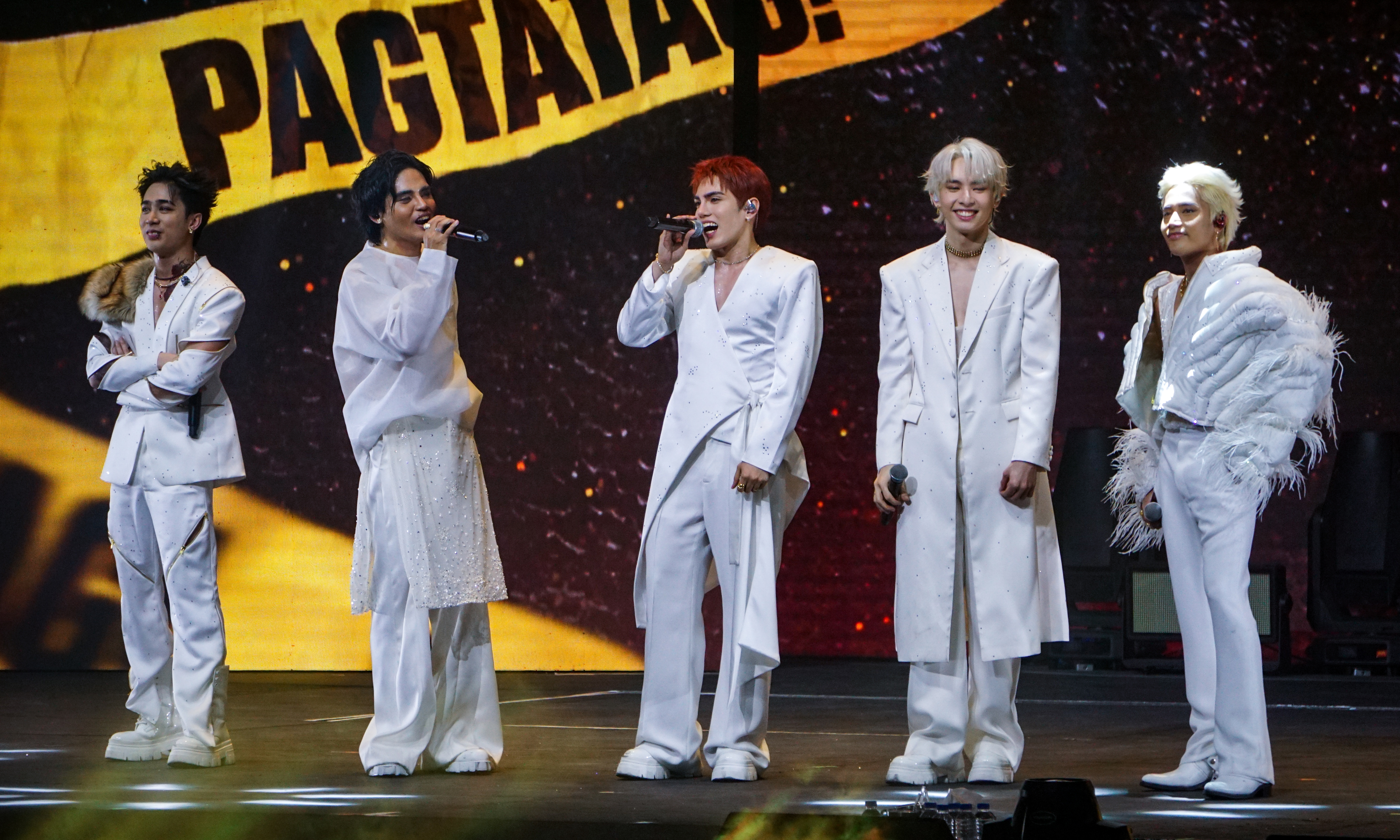
SB19 at the Pagtatag! World Tour (2023); a performance of "Gento" opens each show.

SB19 promoted "Gento" with live performances. The band first performed the song on noontime variety show All-Out Sundays on May 21, 2023. They reprised the song during their appearance on the Wish 107.5 Bus; an accompanying performance video was released on YouTube. "Gento" served as the opening number of their second world tour, the Pagtatag! World Tour (2023–2024). In the United States, they put on a street performance of the song on Hollywood Boulevard and at Times Square. They also performed "Gento" on U.S. television—appearing on KTLA 5 Morning News on August 2, 2023, and on Good Day New York on August 9, 2023. At the Asia Artist Awards 2023—where SB19 was honored with the Best Artist (Singer) award—they performed "Gento" as part of a medley of their songs. The boy band once more performed the song on All-Out Sundays on March 31, 2024. SB19 also performed the song at the Aurora Music Festival 2024, where they were among the headliners. The band performed the song on the First Take on July 1, 2024.

The song became a trend on video sharing service TikTok upon its release, where users—including local and international influencers and celebrities—began posting videos of themselves dancing to the song's chorus, which quickly became a dance challenge. The trend resulted in users using the song in over 1.7 million videos on the platform, which helped expand SB19's reach to several regions around the world, including the United States and parts of Asia and Africa.

== Controversy ==
In an episode of the noontime variety show It's Showtime, dated June 10, 2023, a contestant for the show's game segment requested to dance to "Gento" on stage. The show's crew refused to play the song on air, which startled hosts Vice Ganda and Anne Curtis. Ganda jokingly expressed how playing it on the show would now require a fee, to which Curtis responded, "Really? Isn't playing the song on the show a good promotion for the music industry? [...] It's a pity."

Following the incident, social media users criticized SB19 online, some describing them as "greedy". Twitter users raised concern, leading to discussions about music royalties and the hosts' remarks, which made the phrase "respect local artists" trend on the platform. Singer Sam Concepcion and record producer Thyro Alfaro also participated in the discussion online, expressing support for SB19.

== Credits and personnel ==
Credits are adapted from ABS-CBN News.

- SB19 – vocals
- John Paulo Nase – songwriter, producer
- Joshua Daniel Nase – producer
- Simon Servida – producer
- Heo Chan-goo – mixing, mastering

== Charts ==
Weekly peak chart positions for "Gento"
Chart (2023)	Peak position
Philippines (Billboard)	11
US World Digital Song Sales (Billboard)	8

== Release history ==
Release dates and formats for "Gento"
Region	Date	Format(s)	Version	Label	Ref.
Various	May 19, 2023	Digital download; streaming	Original	Sony Philippines	
Various	August 16, 2024	Digital download; streaming	Live from the First Take	Sony Philippines	
