= Kalakal =

Single by SB19 and Gloc-9
- Language: Tagalog; English; Cebuano
- English title: Trade
- Released: August 9, 2024
- Genre: Hip-hop
- Length: 3:31
- Label: Sony Philippines
- Songwriters: John Paulo Nase; Josh Cullen Santos; Stellvester Ajero; Justin de Dios; Aristotle Pollisco; Felip Jhon Suson
- Producers: John Paulo Nase; Joshua Daniel Nase

SB19 singles chronology
"Ready" (2024)	"Kalakal" (2024)	"Dam" (2025)

Gloc-9 singles chronology
"Debu" (2024)	"Kalakal" (2024)	"Ala" (2024)

Music video
- "Kalakal" on YouTube

"Kalakal" (lit. 'Trade') is a song recorded by the Filipino boy band SB19 and Gloc-9. It was written by the band members and Gloc-9. (Note: Under his real name Aristotle Pollisco) It was produced by John Paulo Nase and Joshua Daniel Nase. It is a hip-hop track that chronicles the artists' journey of establishing their legacy through years of hard work, perseverance, humility, and pure talent. The music video was directed by Alanshiii, and features SB19 members dancing to a song in a set of goods, including clothes, plants, and old television sets, with Gloc-9 pushing a cart. The song was released on August 9, 2024, through Sony Music Philippines.

== Background and release ==
SB19 showcased their unreleased track during their four-song set at Acer Philippines' AimLimitless Concert on August 5, 2024, at Mall of Asia Arena in Pasay, Metro Manila, with Gloc-9 joining the boy band on stage. They announced the collaboration with Gloc-9 following the latter's special appearance at the boy band's Pagtatag! World Tour finale at Araneta Coliseum in May 2024. The song was released on August 9, 2024. The music video was released a month later on September 11, 2024.

SB19's leader, Pablo, revealed that "Kalakal" was created due to the demand for a hip-hop track from the fans. Gloc-9 explained that the song is about fostering confidence in one's own abilities. Despite being ahead of P-pop frontrunners, Gloc-9 was inspired by SB19's dedication and confidence. He admires their willingness to learn and explore ideas, and would love to collaborate with them again if given a chance.

== Composition ==
"Kalakal" is three minutes and thirty-one seconds long. It was written by band members and Gloc-9, and produced by John Paulo Nase and Joshua Daniel Nase. It is a hip-hop track that chronicles the artists' journey of establishing their legacy through years of hard work, perseverance, humility, and pure talent. SB19 collaborated with Gloc-9 for the song, to aim for authentic human connection. The collaboration involved hands-on participation from the beginning, sharing melodic and lyrical ideas, and incorporating Gloc-9's creative stamp. SB19 reintroduces FlipTop-like Pinoy rap to the P-pop genre, showcasing their rap proficiency with blazing trap beats and fierce rhymes.

The track features sharp and fiery lyrics in a mix of Tagalog, English, and Bisaya. "Kalakal" explores the struggles of artists in the music industry, highlighting the harsh treatment they face as commodities. However, the song's message transcends personal struggles and focuses on societal issues, especially for young artists. Josh's metaphorical line, "Paano pa kaya kapag naputol itong kadena," (lit. 'What if this chain is broken?') suggests that talented individuals are bound by societal chains, hindering their full potential.

== Music video ==
The music video was directed by Alanshiii. It features SB19 members dancing to a song in a set of goods, including clothes, plants, and old television sets. The items showcase the members' solo releases, including Ken's 7sins album cover, Stell's "Room" single, and Josh's JC logo. Gloc-9 enters the video while pushing a cart, which was also featured in the lyric video. It also showcases a blend of hip-hop and Pinoy culture, featuring graffiti, ukay-ukay clothing racks, traditional rice stands, and the iconic kalakal wagon. SB19 members wear hip-hop-inspired outfits with silver metal accents, while Gloc-9 wears a signature hip-hop hat and layered clothing. His performance on a throne-like chair adds to the fiery vibes.

== Accolades ==
Awards and nominations for "Kalakal"
Award	Year	Category	Result	Ref.
Awit Awards	2025	Best Rap/Hip-hop Recording	Won	
Awit Awards	2025	Music Video of the Year	Won	
Awit Awards	2025	Best Cover Art	Won	
Awit Awards	2025	People's Voice Award – Favorite Collaboration	Won	
P-pop Music Awards	2024	Collaboration of the Year	Nominated	
PMPC Star Awards for Music	2026	Music Video of the Year	Won	
PMPC Star Awards for Music	2026	Collaboration of the Year	Nominated	
Wish 107.5 Music Awards	2025	Wish Song Collaboration of the Year	Won	

== Credits and personnel ==
Credits are adapted from Apple Music.

- SB19 – vocals
- Gloc-9 – vocals
- John Paulo Nase – songwriter, producer
- Josh Cullen Santos – songwriter
- Stellvester Ajero – songwriter
- Justin de Dios – songwriter
- Aristotle Pollisco – songwriter
- Felip Jhon Suson – songwriter
- Joshua Daniel Nase – producer
- Emil Dela Rosa – mastering engineer, mixing engineer
