= Pagtatag! World Tour =

2023–2024 concert tour by SB19

- World tour by SB19
- Promotional poster for Quezon City shows
- Location: Asia; North America
- Associated album: Pagtatag!
- Start date: June 24, 2023
- End date: May 19, 2024
- No. of shows: 18

SB19 concert chronology
- WYAT (Where You At) Tour (2022); Pagtatag! World Tour (2023); Simula at Wakas World Tour (2025)

The Pagtatag! World Tour was the second world tour headlined by Filipino boy band SB19, launched to support their second extended play (EP), Pagtatag! (2023). The world tour spanned 18 shows that commenced on June 24, 2023, in Quezon City, Philippines, with stops in the United States, Canada, and Japan. The tour concluded on May 19, 2024.

The boy band began sharing details about the tour's development in 2022 while embarking on their first world tour, the WYAT (Where You At) Tour. The tour was announced through the band's social media accounts, initially having 12 dates, after posting a trailer revealing their EP's release. The boy band began rehearsing for the tour a month before the EP's release, which they stated would have a longer production compared to their previous tour. The tour's two kickoff shows at Smart Araneta Coliseum were sold-out.

The tour's set list consisted mainly of songs from the boy band's catalog, including all songs from Pagtatag!, and also featured solo performances from each band member of songs from their own solo discography, which all spanned around two hours in run time. Band members Stell and Justin performed cover versions of songs from Idina Menzel and One Direction, respectively. The tour received positive reviews from critics, who praised the boy band's stage presence and concert performances.

== Background and development ==
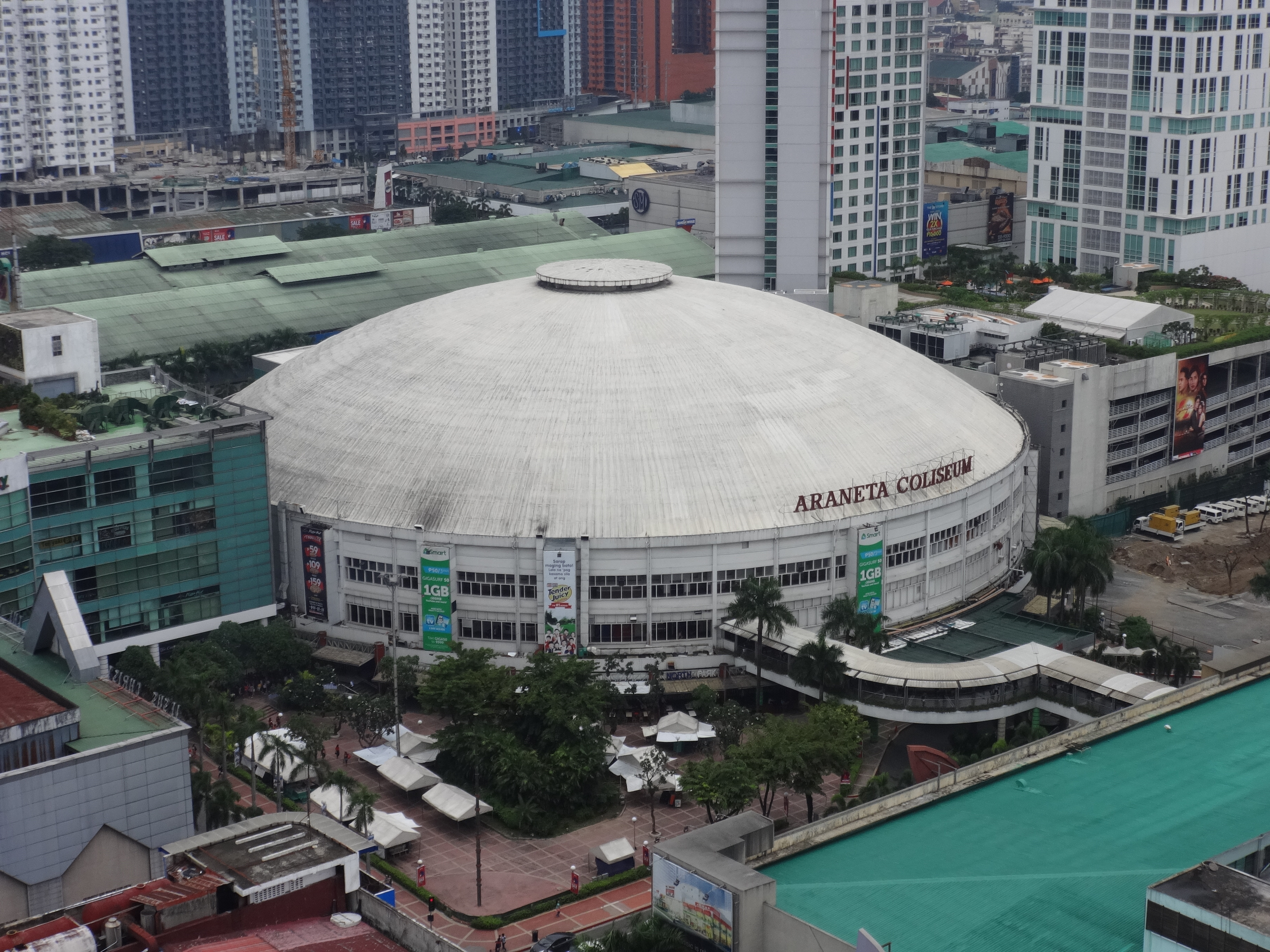
Smart Araneta Coliseum in Quezon City hosted the first two sold-out shows of the tour.

SB19 embarked on their first world tour with the WYAT (Where You At) Tour in 2022. Amidst touring, the group revealed their 2023 plans in an interview with CNN Philippines, hinting at a new music release and a "bigger" world tour. In a press conference, the band's leader, Pablo, revealed that their forthcoming music release would revolve around the word "pagtatag" (lit. 'establishment') and would continue to explore more genres and life experiences.

On April 29, 2023, the boy band posted a trailer revealing the title of their second extended play (EP), Pagtatag! and its release date. Later, the Pagtatag! World Tour and its concert dates were officially announced on April 30, 2023 through SB19's social media accounts to support the EP. The concert tour initially consisted of 12 concert dates, starting with two shows at the Smart Araneta Coliseum in Quezon City on June 24 and 25, 2023, with stops across the United States and Canada. TicketNet handled the tour's opening nights' ticket sales, with prices ranging from ₱1,000 up to ₱6,500. Eventually, both shows sold-out. Various ticketing outlets, including SM Tickets, AXS, and Ticketmaster, handled the ticket sales for the remaining shows.

The band gradually announced additional dates for the tour in the Philippines and parts of Asia. On May 24, 2023, the group announced more shows in Davao City and Bacolod. The group also made multiple announcements for additional shows in Asia. On October 3, 2023, they announced additional shows for Singapore, Bangkok, and Dubai, and on October 30, 2023, for Tokorozawa.

Sony Music Philippines released Pagtatag! on June 9, 2023. The EP explored various music genres, including songs with pop, hip hop, EDM, soul, R&B, ballad, and acoustic elements. In a press launch for the EP, band member Justin revealed that the group began rehearsing for the tour a month before the EP's release and commented on the development of the Pagtatag! World Tour, assuring a longer production and a show that would exceed the performances from their previous tour: "The preparation, compared [with] our WYAT Tour, it is a bit longer [...] we always accompany that with rehearsals, so we can ensure that what we expect for ourselves in our upcoming tour would exceed, or we can surprise everyone—levelling up from before."

To further promote the Pagtatag! World Tour, SB19 made appearances on television, performing at variety shows All-Out Sundays and ASAP Natin 'To. The tour was produced with a production team based in the Philippines. Each concert had a run time of approximately two hours.

On March 25, 2024, SB19 announced a two-day homecoming concert titled Pagtatag! Finale, set to conclude their world tour. The concert was held on May 18 and 19, 2024, at the Smart Araneta Coliseum in Quezon City. A livestream of the concert was also made available to fans via iWantTFC.

== Concert synopsis ==
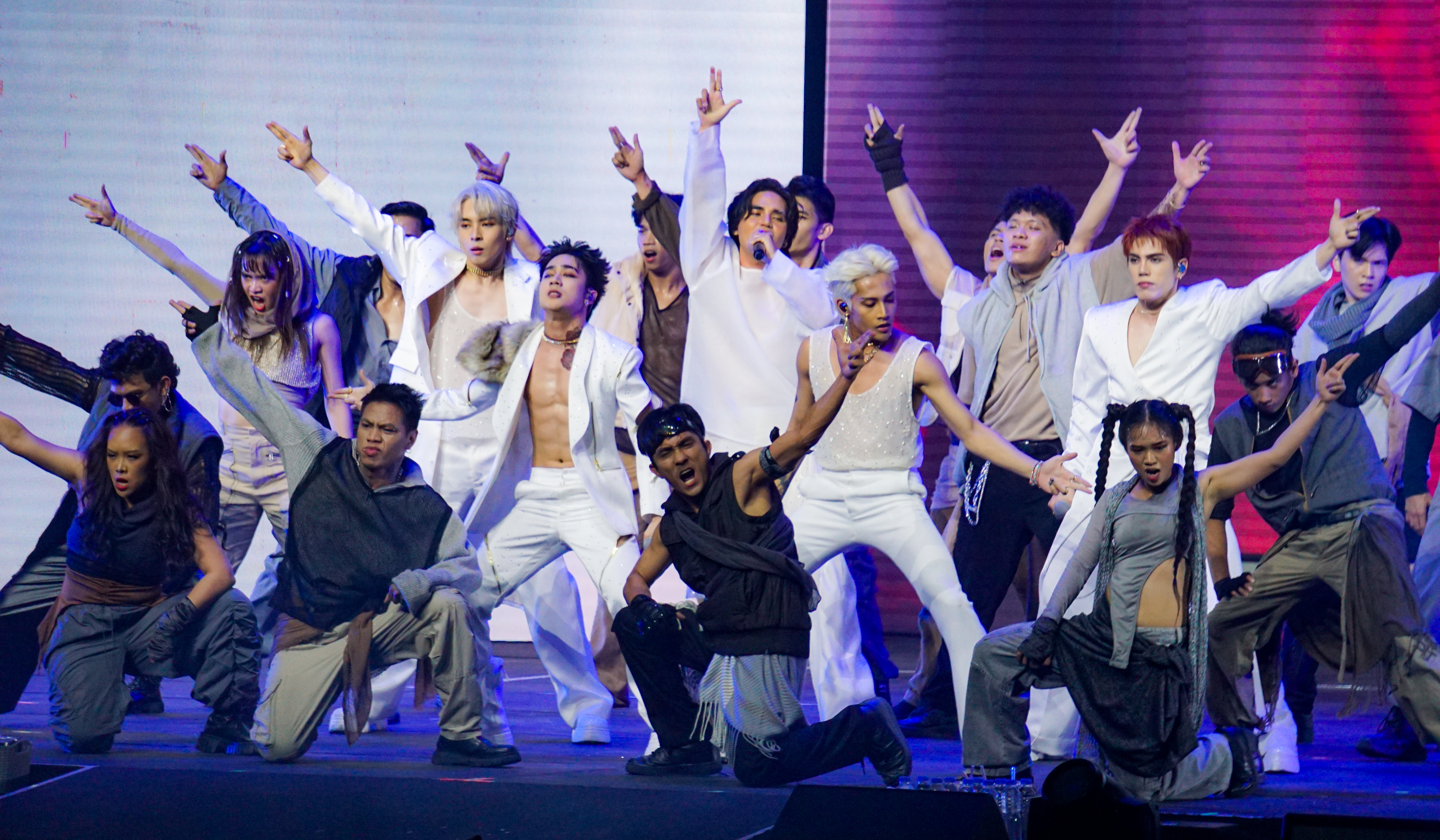
SB19 performing "Mana" with their backup dancers

Each show began with a brief video introduction of SB19 at a gold mine. The group opened each concert with a performance of "Gento" (2023), accompanied by yellow stage lighting and visuals resembling a cave. A dancer then performed an interpretive dance routine, after which Ken and Pablo returned on stage to begin performing "Mana" (2021), a track from their first EP, Pagsibol, followed by the rest of the band members. The group followed it with slower numbers, performing their ballads—a mashup of "Hanggang sa Huli" (2020) and "Tilaluha" (2018), "Ilaw" (2023), "Liham" (2023), "Mapa" (2021), and "Nyebe" (2022). They then changed into black and neon green outfits and performed the upbeat tracks, "Crimzone" (2023) and "Bazinga" (2021).

Each member then proceeded with their solo performances. Stell performed a cover of Idina Menzel's "Defying Gravity" (2003), followed by Josh's performance of "Get Right" (2023) and his debut single "Wild Tonight" (2023). Ken then performed his songs "Criminal" (2023) and "Straydogs" (2023) from his EP titled COM•PLEX, after which Justin performed a cover of One Direction's "Little Things" (2012). Pablo finished the act with a performance of his single "La Luna" (2022). The rest of the band members then returned on stage to perform another track from the EP, "I Want You" (2023). Afterwards, they performed their earlier releases, "WYAT (Where You At)" (2022) and "Go Up" (2019), followed by a performance of "Freedom" (2023). SB19 closed each show with an encore performance of "What?" (2021).

== Critical reception ==
The concert tour was met with positive responses from critics. Rafael Bautista of Nylon Manila praised the boy band's stage presence on the tour's opening nights in Araneta Coliseum, writing, "the concerts proved again that SB19 will always command that stage". Bautista also commended the looks, choreography, production, vocals, and storytelling, arguing that the boy band "rocked the Big Dome." Chlarine Gianan of Mega magazine described the tour's opening nights as "filled with the group's individual and collective talents" and commented that the tour proved that the group is in the right place for P-pop. In Davao, SunStar Davao's Allan Joseph Albior remarked that the boy band "delivered an intense show," asserting that they delivered "breathtaking performances" and "left the audience in awe".

== Accolades ==
Awards and nominations for the Pagtatag! World Tour
Award	Year	Category	Result	Ref.
Aliw Awards	2024	Best Collaboration in a Concert	Nominated	
P-pop Music Awards	2024	Concert of the Year	Nominated	
PMPC Star Awards for Music	2026	Concert of the Year	Won	

== Set list ==
The following set list is from the June 24 and 25, 2023 shows in Quezon City. It is not representative of all shows throughout the tour.

1. "Gento"
2. "Mana"
3. "Hanggang sa Huli" / "Tilaluha"
4. "Ilaw"
5. "Liham"
6. "Mapa"
7. "Nyebe"
8. "Crimzone"
9. "Bazinga"
10. "Defying Gravity" (solo cover performance by Stell)
11. "Get Right" (solo performance by Josh)
12. "Wild Tonight" (solo performance by Josh)
13. "Criminal" (solo performance by Ken)
14. "Straydogs" (solo performance by Ken)
15. "Little Things" (solo cover performance by Justin)
16. "La Luna" (solo performance by Pablo)
17. "I Want You"
18. "WYAT (Where You At)"
19. "Go Up"
20. "Freedom"
21. "What?"

== Film ==
Pagtatag! The Documentary is a Philippine documentary concert film directed by Jed Regala that chronicles the group's journey throughout the Pagtatag! World Tour while touching on the challenges and struggles of being self-managed. It released in Philippine theaters on August 28, 2024. The documentary also had international releases in Singapore, Hong Kong, United Arab Emirates, the United States, and the United Kingdom.

On June 26, 2025, Netflix Philippines announced the release of the film on the streaming platform on July 23, 2025.

== Shows ==
List of concert tour dates, showing city, country, and venue
Date	City	Country	Venue
June 24, 2023	Quezon City (Note: Promoted as Manila)	Philippines	Smart Araneta Coliseum
June 25, 2023	Quezon City	Philippines	Smart Araneta Coliseum
July 5, 2023	Davao	Philippines	SMX Convention Center Davao
July 9, 2023	Bacolod	Philippines	SMX Convention Center Bacolod
July 21, 2023	Chicago	United States	Copernicus Center
July 22, 2023	Arlington (Note: Promoted as Dallas)	United States	Center for Visual & Performing Arts
July 28, 2023	Redwood City (Note: Promoted as San Francisco)	United States	Fox Theatre
July 29, 2023	Anaheim (Note: Promoted as Los Angeles)	United States	City National Grove of Anaheim
August 5, 2023	New York City	United States	Webster Hall
August 6, 2023	Washington, D.C.	United States	Lisner Auditorium
August 11, 2023	Pickering (Note: Promoted as Toronto)	Canada	The Arena
August 13, 2023	Winnipeg	Canada	Club Regent Event Centre
August 18, 2023	Vancouver	Canada	The Centre
August 20, 2023	Edmonton	Canada	Northern Alberta Jubilee Auditorium
April 24, 2024	Dubai	United Arab Emirates	The Agenda
April 29, 2024 (Note: The Tokorozawa show was originally scheduled for December 9, 2023, but was postponed to April 29, 2024.)	Tokorozawa	Japan	Pavilion Tokorozawa Sakura Town
May 18, 2024	Quezon City	Philippines	Smart Araneta Coliseum
May 19, 2024	Quezon City	Philippines	Smart Araneta Coliseum

=== Cancelled shows ===
List of cancelled concert tour dates, showing city, country, venue, and reason for cancellation
Date	City	Country	Venue	Reason
November 15, 2023	Singapore		Capitol Theatre	Unforeseen circumstances
November 19, 2023	Bangkok	Thailand	KBank Siam Pic-Ganesha Theatre	Current complexities
November 24, 2023	Dubai	United Arab Emirates	Sheikh Rashid Auditorium	Undisclosed reasons
