= I Want You (SB19 song) =

- Promotional poster for "I Want You"

Song by SB19

from the EP Pagtatag!
- Released: June 9, 2023
- Genre: Soul; R&B
- Length: 3:43
- Label: Sony Philippines
- Songwriters: August Rigo; John Paulo Nase
- Producer: August Rigo

Music video
- "I Want You" on YouTube

"I Want You" (stylized in all uppercase) is a song recorded by the Filipino boy band SB19, taken from their second extended play (EP), Pagtatag! (2023). Written by its producer, August Rigo, and the band's leader, Pablo, "I Want You" is a soul and R&B love song about expressing desire for a person. Before the EP's release, Rigo teased working with SB19 in late 2022, following their previous collaboration with the group's rendition of Eraserheads' "Christmas Party" (2022). Sony Music Philippines released the EP on June 9, 2023, with "I Want You" as its second track.

Reviews from music critics applauded the band's ability to cross genres, and Billboard Philippines has listed "I Want You" as one of the best Filipino songs of 2023. The accompanying music video, directed by Jed Regala, depicted multiple scenes of the group underwater. The group promoted the song with live performances and included it on the set list of their Pagtatag! World Tour (2023–2024). The song won the Wishclusive R&B Performance of the Year award at the 2024 Wish 107.5 Music Awards.

== Background and release ==
In late 2022, the Filipino boy band SB19 embarked on their first world tour with the WYAT (Where You At) Tour. While touring, the group told in an interview with CNN Philippines that the group is working on a new music release planned for 2023. Later, in a press conference, the band's leader, Pablo, revealed that the group's forthcoming music release would be based on the word "pagtatag" (lit. 'establishment'). Other members added that they would explore different music genres and life experiences.

SB19 and the record producer August Rigo first collaborated with the group's rendition of Eraserheads' "Christmas Party", released on December 23, 2022, to celebrate Eraserheads' reunion concert. Rigo acknowledged their collaboration through a post on Instagram, where he also teased the possibility of working together in the future.

On April 29, 2023, SB19 posted a trailer for their second extended play (EP), Pagtatag!, on YouTube and announced its release date. It marked the band's first new musical release since Pagsibol (2021). Sony Music Philippines released the EP on June 9, 2023, consisting of six tracks; "I Want You" appears as its second track.

== Composition and reception ==
"I Want You" is three minutes and forty-three seconds long. It was written by the song's producer, August Rigo, and the band's leader, Pablo. Heo Chan-goo of Knob Sound Korea mixed and mastered the song. The media has described the track as a "sensual" slow-paced love song that spans soul and R&B genres, inspired by the 1990s music. The lyrics are provocative and take a point of view of having a desire for a person they love: "I wanna fall on my knees beg for your body on me / 'Cause I want you / You know how I like it / Girl, I want you."

The song was met with positive reviews from music critics. Justine Rey of Scout magazine opined that SB19 suited the R&B genre of "I Want You" well and praised the song's mystery, intimacy, and authenticity. Nylon Manila's Rafael Bautista considered the song an "immersive track" and noted how the song showcased the band's raw passion and emotions. Gabriel Saulog of Billboard Philippines praised the song's vocals and saw the potential of what the group could explore in their future projects. In Billboard Philippines's year-end list of top Filipino songs of 2023, "I Want You" was included, with Jenny Fernandez remarking that the song is an unexpected addition to SB19's discography and praising what they can do. In a separate review by the magazine, the song ranked among the best songs from the group's discography.

== Accolades ==
Awards and nominations for "I Want You"
Award	Year	Category	Result	Ref.
Awit Awards	2024	Best R&B Recording	Nominated	
Awit Awards	2024	Best Engineered Recording	Nominated	
Awit Awards	2024	Best Vocal Arrangement	Nominated	
Awit Awards	2024	Music Video of the Year	Nominated	
Wish 107.5 Music Awards	2024	Wishclusive R&B Performance of the Year	Won	

== Promotion ==
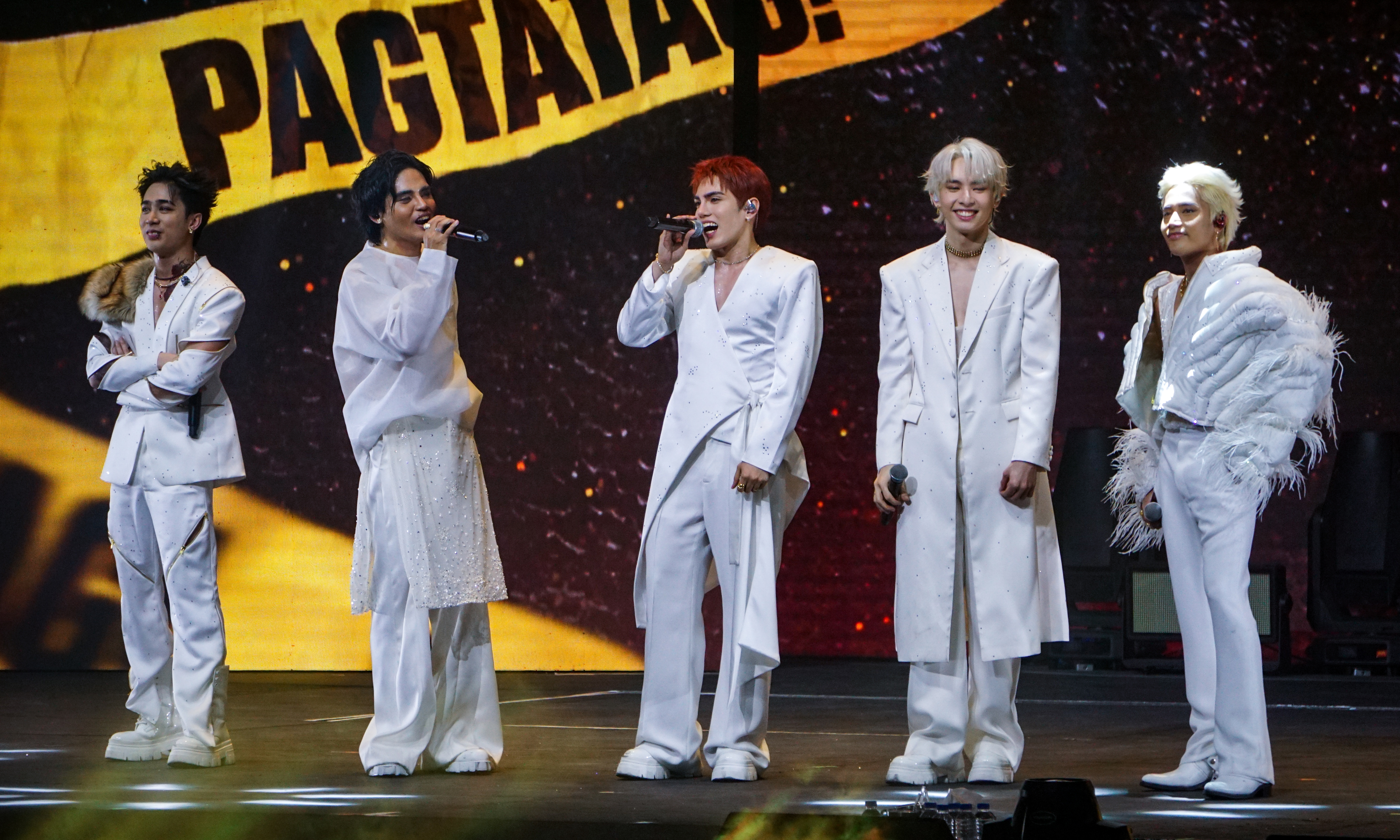
SB19 at the Pagtatag! World Tour (2023); they included "I Want You" on the tour's set list.

The music video for "I Want You", directed by Jed Regala, was released on June 9, 2023, the same day as the release of Pagtatag!. The video is "sultry-themed" and depicts SB19 in seductive scenes, some of them shot underwater. The video also featured scenes using overlaid images, smoke elements, and nature visuals.

"I Want You" was included on the set list of the band's second world tour, the Pagtatag! World Tour (2023). Aside from touring, SB19 promoted the song with other live performances. They first performed the song on the noontime variety show ASAP Natin 'To on June 11, 2023. The group reprised their performance during their appearance at PPOPCON 2023. In the United States, they put on a street performance of the song, including other songs from the EP, on Hollywood Boulevard and at Times Square. SB19 also performed the song during their appearance at the BYS Fashion Week 2023. They released an official live performance video of the song via Vevo.

== Credits and personnel ==
Credits are adapted from Tidal and the song's music video.

- SB19 – vocals
- August Rigo – songwriter, producer
- John Paulo Nase – songwriter
- Heo Chan-goo – mixing, mastering
