= 17th PMPC Star Awards for Music =

2026 award ceremony for Filipino music

- Date: June 25, 2026
- Venue: Teatrino Promenade, Greenhills, San Juan City, Philippines
- Hosted by: Jayda Avanzado; Dylan Menor; Jarren Garcia; Marthena Jickain
- Most wins: SB19
- Most nominations: TJ Monterde

Philippine coverage
- Runtime: 210 minutes
- Produced by: Echo Jham Entertainment Production
- Directed by: Calvin Murphy Neria

The 17th PMPC Star Awards for Music is an annual Philippine music awards show honoring the best in Philippine music after the period October 27, 2024. The show was organized and the winners were chosen by the members of the Philippine Movie Press Club (PMPC).

PMPC skipped the calendar year of 2025 entirely for this event. This gap occurred because they previously compressed their schedule by holding both the 15th and 16th editions back-to-back in 2024 (April and October respectively). Following that double-header, the organization took a break through 2025 and returned to announce the nominees for the 17th Star Awards for Music.

The upcoming 17th edition will be celebrated on June 25, 2026 at the Teatrino Promenade in Greenhills, San Juan City, Philippines. Echo Jham Entertainment Production is also set to co-produce. No television broadcast has been announced yet but it was livestreamed via YouTube.

== Background ==
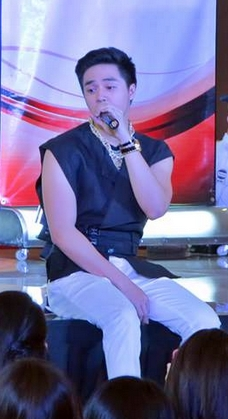
Sam Concepcion

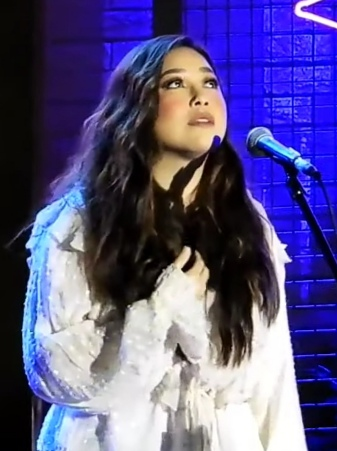
Moira Dela Torre won Female Recording Artist of the Year

On 30 May 2026, the Philippine Movie Press Club (PMPC) announced the nominees for the 17th PMPC Star Awards for Music.

=== Category changes ===
There are four (4) new categories denoted by (+) namely: New Male Group Artist of the Year, New Female Group Artist of the Year, Dance Recording of the Year and Revival Recording of the Year.

A new special category was also revealed days ahead of the ceremony. The "Mga Natatanging Alagad ng Musikang Pilipino" will be given and the inaugural award goes to The Rainmakers who celebrates their 50th anniversary in the music industry.

Five (5) categories are discontinued/suspended denoted by (†) namely: Rock Album of the Year, Novelty Song of the Year, Novelty Artist of the Year, Dance Album of the Year, and Revival Album of the Year.

In partnership with PlayTime Entertainment, the event also introduced the “Star Awards for Music Fan Favorite” category, a public voting award featuring nominees Cup of Joe, Bini, SB19, TJ Monterde, KZ Tandingan, and Maki, with voting held from June 3 to 22, 2026.

== Presenters ==
Jayda Avanzado and Dylan Menor were announced as the hosts of the ceremony on June 25, 2026, together with Jarren Garcia and upcoming star Marthena Jickain.

== Performers ==
On June 22, 2026, it was announced that Sam Concepcion and Jarren Garcia will open the show.

List of performers at the 17th PMPC Star Awards for Music:

Artist(s)	Song(s)
Jarren Garcia	Opening - "Gotchu"
Sam Concepcion	"Otomatika"
Jojo Mendrez	"Yakap"
Ima Castro	"Minsan ang Minahal ay Ako,""Gaano Ko Ikaw Kamahal" medley
The Rainmakers	"Binibini"
Salbakuta	"Andrew Ford Medina,""Humanap Ka Ng Panget!,""Alabang Girls" medley
Chad Borja and JV Decena	"Baliw"
Moira dela Torre	Closing - "San Ka Na?"

== Nominees and winners ==
The nominees of this year's PMPC Star Awards include some of the promising and biggest names in OPM, including Ely Buendia, Bini, James Reid and SB19, while leading this year's pack is TJ Monterde, who garnered a total of nine nominations,

On June 22, 2026, PMPC announced the partial list of winners on some categories, while the rest will be announced on the ceremony on June 25, 2026 at the venue.

Among those who were revealed on the partial list were Bini who won the Dance Recording of the Year award for "Salamin Salamin", while Juan Karlos Labajo was named Male Acoustic Artist of the Year for his song "Tanga Mo Juan". Vice Ganda also emerged as a winner after his song "Rainbow Christmas" bagged the Christmas Song of the Year accolade.

The following are the nominations for the 17th PMPC Star Awards for Music, covering music released after the period October 27, 2024.

The winners are listed topmost and in bold.

=== Major categories ===
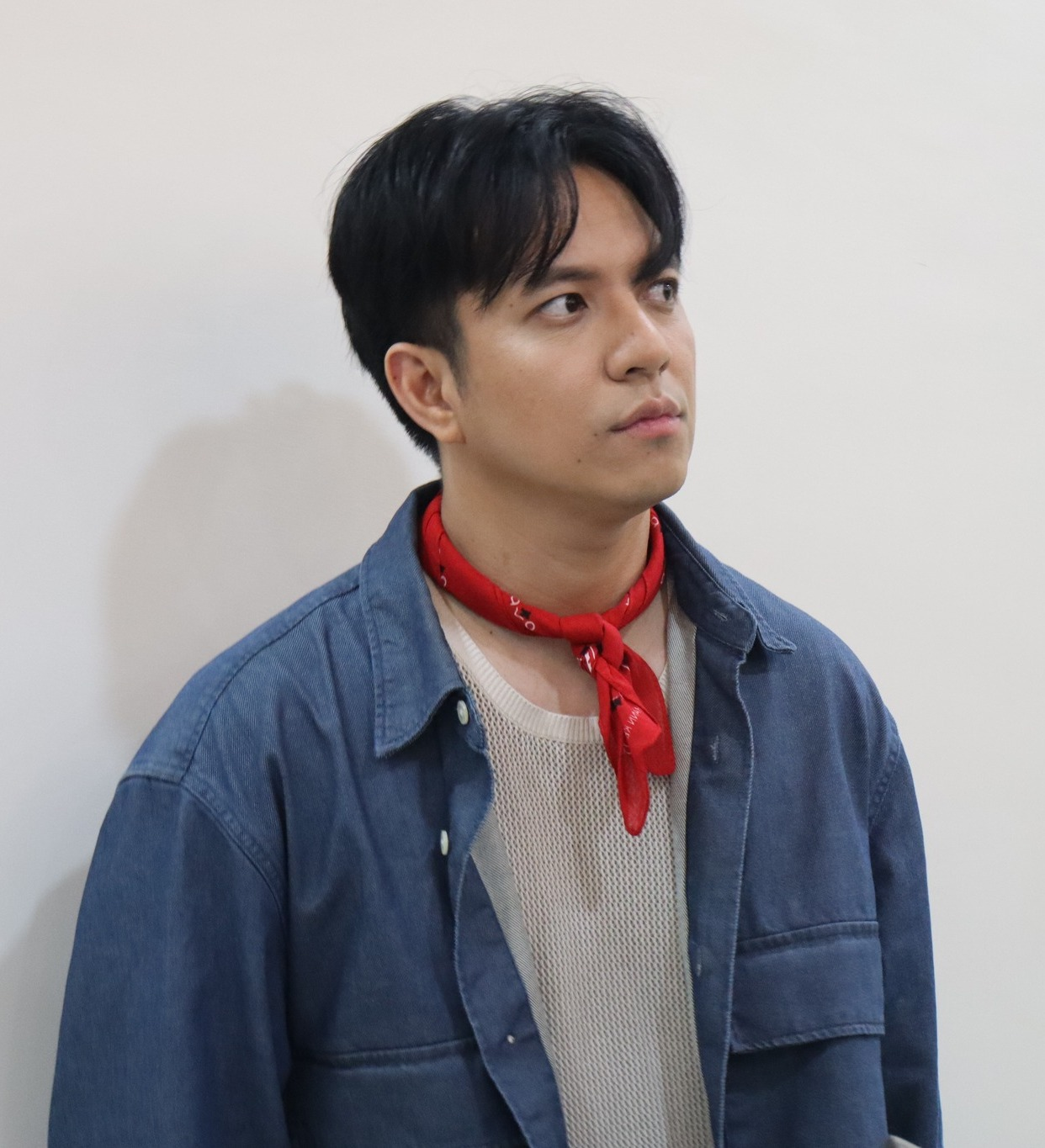
TJ Monterde with 9 nominations

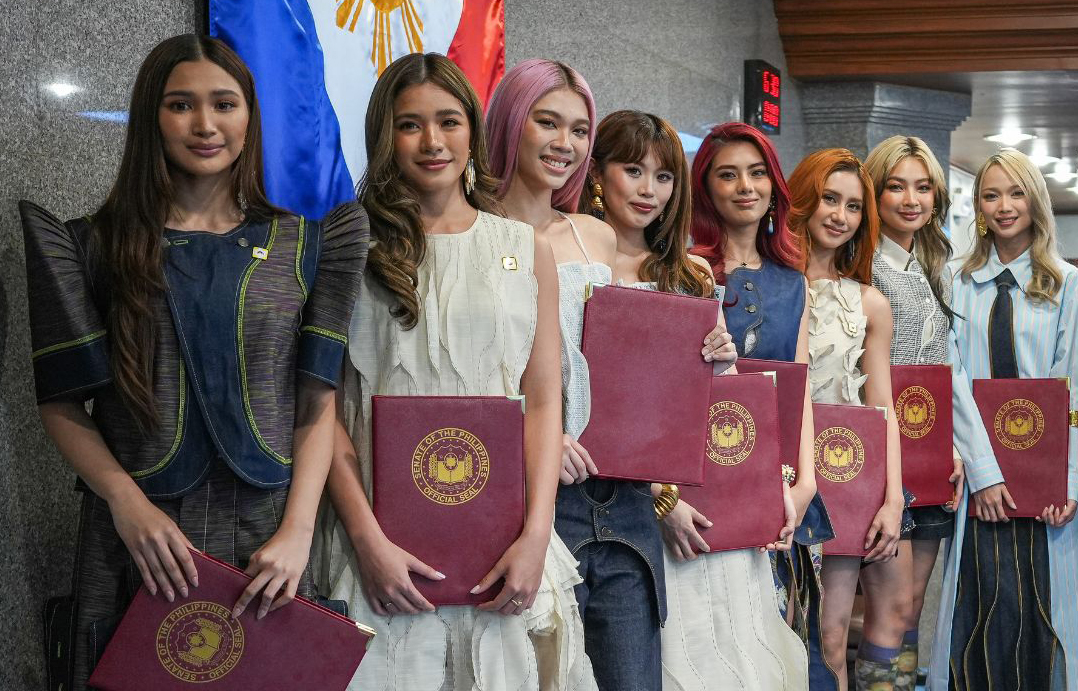
Bini with 6 nominations

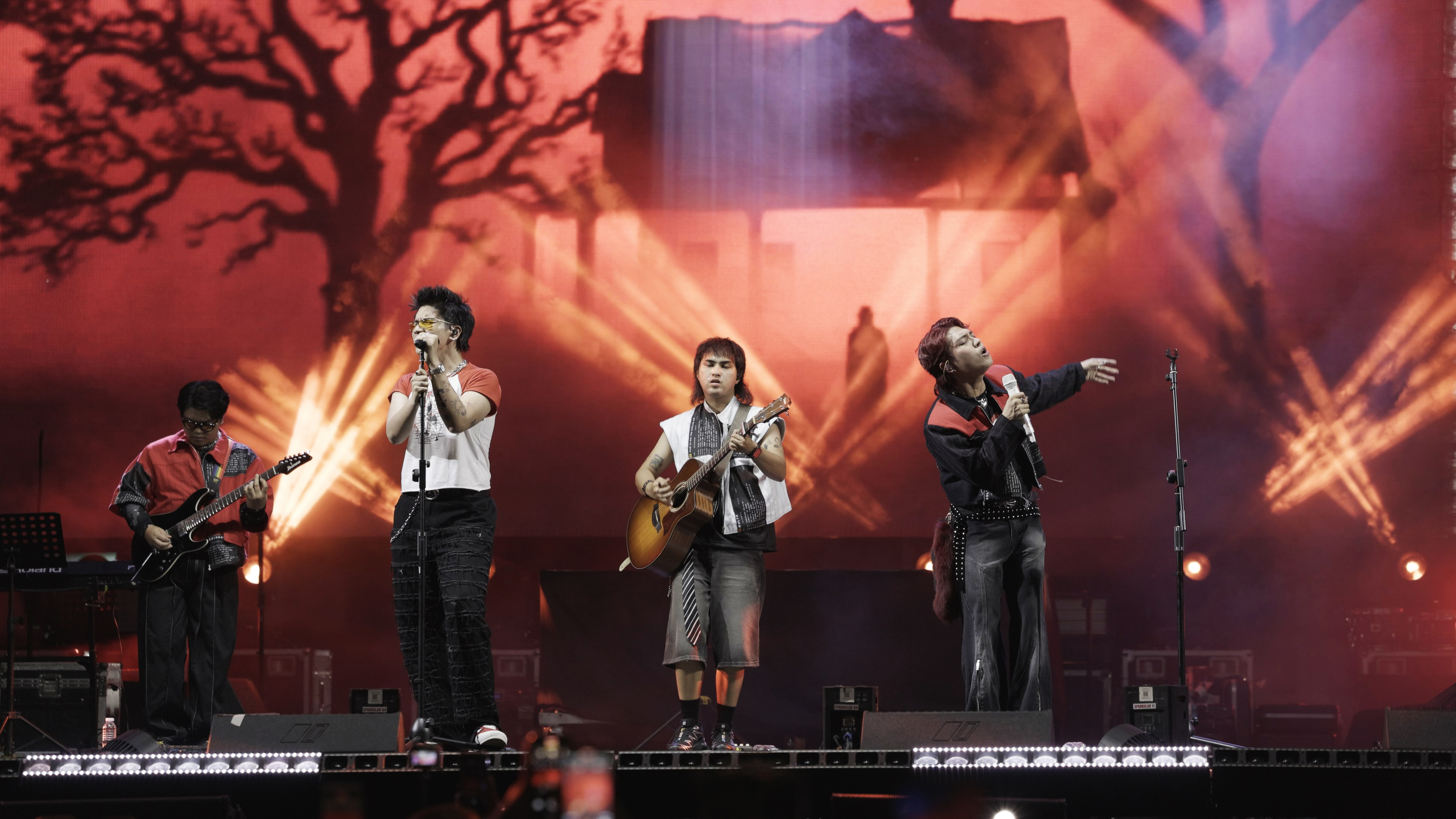
Cup of Joe with 5 nominations

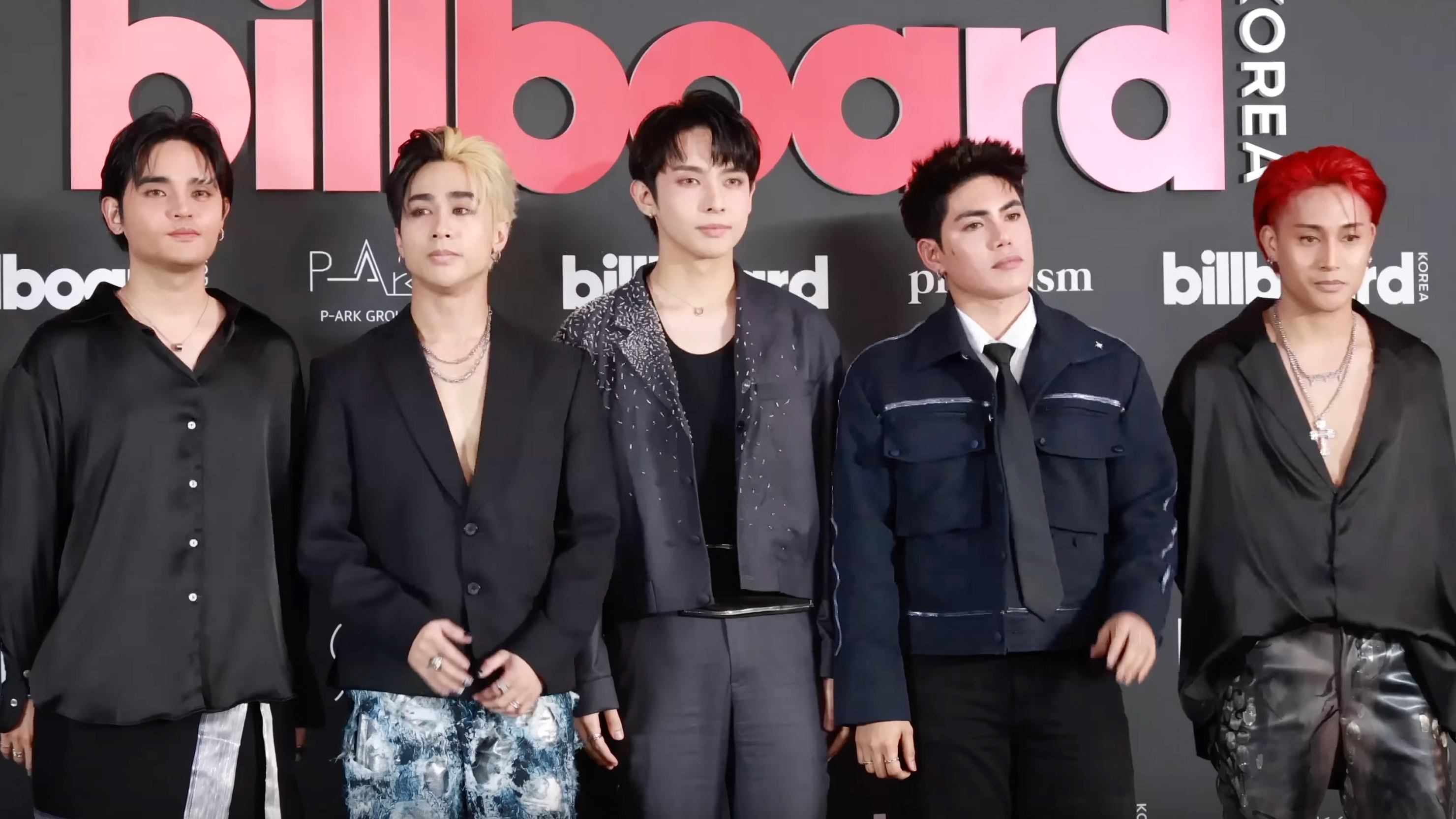
SB19 with 5 nominations

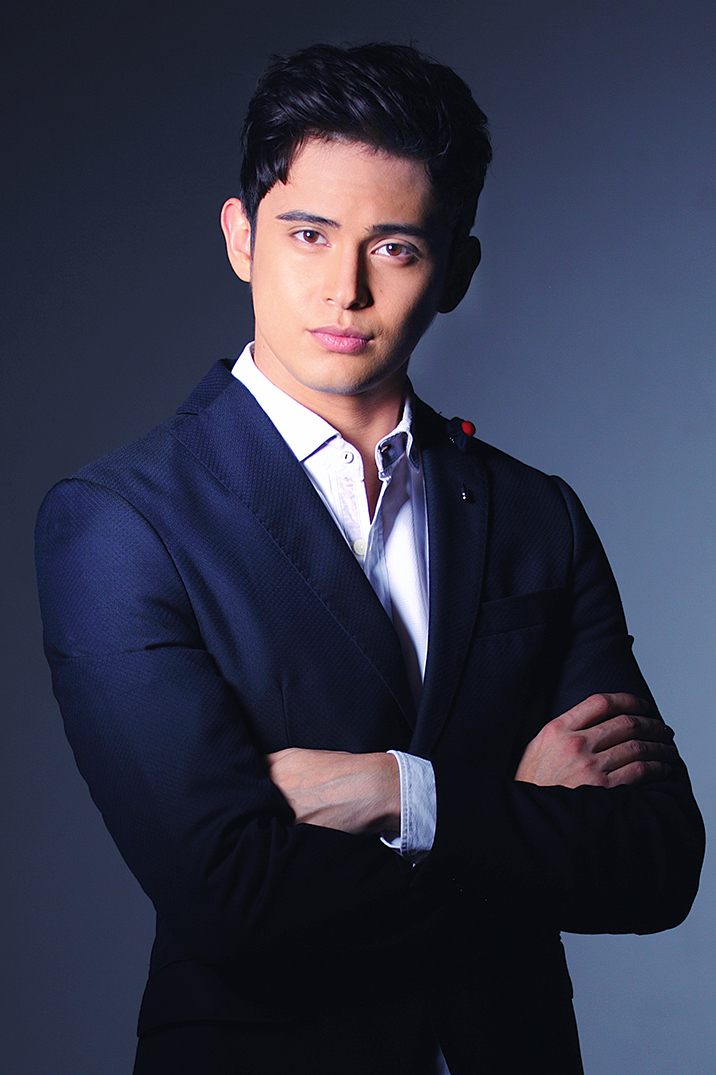
James Reid with 4 nominations including Album of the Year

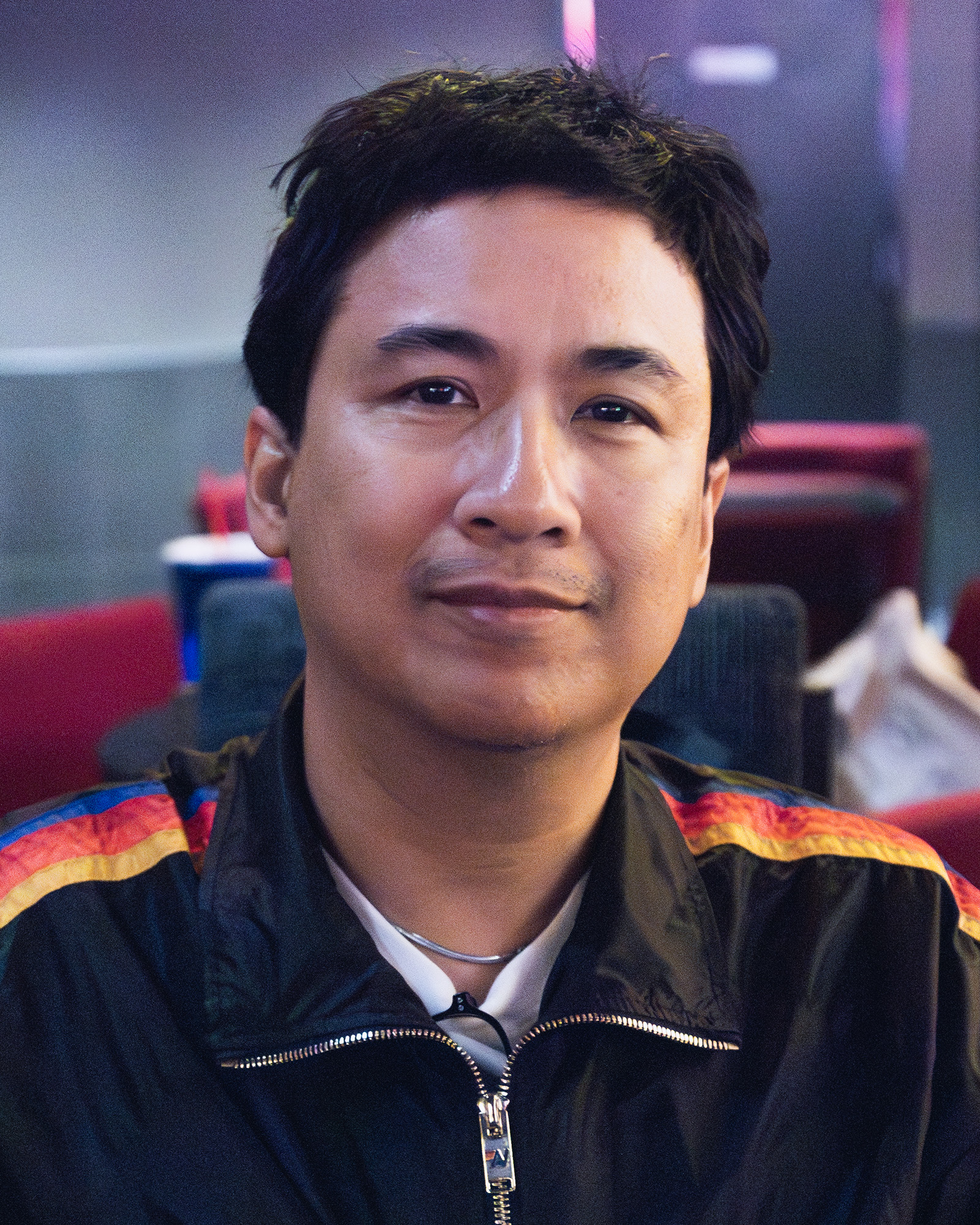
Ely Buendia nominated for Album of the Year

**Album of the Year**: **"jgh" – James Reid (Careless/Sony Music Philippines)**; "Lola Amour" – Lola Amour (Warner Music Philippines); "Method Adaptor" – Ely Buendia (Sony Music Philippines/Offshore); "MU" – Arthur Miguel (Warner Music Philippines); "Sariling Mundo" – TJ Monterde (Cornerstone Entertainment); "Talaarawan" – Bini (Star Music); "The Traveller Across Dimensions" – Ben&Ben (Ben&Ben Music/Sony Music Philippines)	**Song of the Year**: **"Dilaw" – Maki (Tarsier Records)**; "Marilag" – Dionela (UMG Phils./EMI Records Phils.); "Multo" – Cup of Joe (Viva Records); "Nami-miss Ko Na" – Lola Amour (Warner Music Philippines); "Palagi" – TJ Monterde (Cornerstone Entertainment); "Sa Bawat Sandali" – Amiel Sol (Ivory Music); "Salamin, Salamin" – Bini (Star Music)
**Male Recording Artist of the Year**: **TJ Monterde – "Sariling Mundo" (PolyEast Records)**; Darren Espanto – "Iyo" (Star Music); Inigo Pascual – "Kahit Di Mo Ko Nakikita 2" (Republic Records Philippines); Juan Karlos – "Tanga Mo Juan" (UMG Philippines); Maki – "Dilaw" (Tarsier Records); Rob Deniel – "Happy Ending" (Viva Records)	**Female Recording Artist of the Year**: **Moira dela Torre – "San Ka Na?" (UMG Philippines)**; Dia Maté – "Ganda-Gandahan" (Island Records Philippines); Eliza Maturan – "Museo" (Unstable Records); Janah Zaplan – "I Luv U" (StarPop); Jayda Avanzado – "Right Lover, Wrong Time" (UMG Philippines); Klarisse de Guzman – "Minamahal Pa Rin Ako" (StarPop); KZ Tandingan – "Toyo" (StarPop)
**New Male Recording Artist of the Year**: **Dwayne Garcia – "Taym Perst Muna"**; Frank Lloyd Mamaril – "Made to Believe"; Gaz Magalona – "Di Madali Pero Kaya"; Kiel – "Bibitaw Na Ba?"; Marko Rudio – "Kasama Ka"; MC4D – "I'm All That"; Serlwin Rey – "Heartbreak Dilemma"	**New Female Recording Artist of the Year**: **Debbie Lopez – "Ang Higugmaon Ka"**; Alyssa Muhlach – "Paalam"; Andrea Gutierrez – "Naghihintay"; Graciel Hizon – "Ang Tanging Alam Ko"; Isha Ponti – "Lambing"; Liana Castillo – "Umaambisyon"; Ryannah J – "This Na Malambing"; Shierrah – "Hindi Na Babalik"
**Duo/Group Artist of the Year**: **Ben&Ben – "The Traveller Across Dimensions" (Sony Music Philippines)**; Bini – "Talaarawan" (Star Music); Cup of Joe – "Multo" (Viva Records); Lola Amour – "Lola Amour" (Warner Music Philippines); SB19 – "Kalakal" (Sony Music Philippines); Sponge Cola – "Tatlong Buwan" (Universal Records); The Juans – "Puwede Ba Kitang Ligawan" (Viva Records)	**New Male Group Artist of the Year +**: **Five Fingers – "Lakas Mo" (Star Music / DNA Music PH)**; 12th Street – "Walang Humpay" (O/C Records); 6ense – "H.U.G." (N.EXT Entertainment); Formula 5 – "Sa Darating na Pasko" (FLM Creatives and Productions Inc.); Magic Voyz – "Sa Bintana" (Viva Records / LDG Production); Neo – "Tugatog" (Celebrity Studio); News:ID – "Ghost" (MLD Entertainment); Sync – "Balang Araw" (Sirius8 Entertainment)
**New Female Group Artist of the Year +**: **Pixie – "Iced Coffee" (Viva Records)**; Fina – "Paramdam" (Universal Records); Finix – "Hand in Hand" (GKD Records); Raya – "Bling" (Viva Records); Sugar N’ Spice – "Sugar Sugar" (Vicor Music); Vvink – "Alon" (FlipMusic Records); Ziren – "Punong Puno" (Independent)	**Music Video of the Year**: **"Kalakal" – SB19 and Gloc-9**; "Di Nakakasawa" – Arthur Nery; "Misteryoso" – Cup of Joe; "Palagi" – TJ Monterde; "Pulso" – Zack Tabudlo; "Salamin, Salamin" – Bini; "Sining" – Dionela; "Tiger" – Mayonnaise

=== Pop category ===
**Pop Album of the Year**: **Talaarawan – Bini (Star Music)**; II: The Second – Arthur Nery (Viva Records); I'm Okay – Moira Dela Torre (UMG Philippines); jgh – James Reid (Careless/Sony Music Philippines); Lola Amour – Lola Amour (Warner Music Philippines); Sariling Mundo – TJ Monterde (PolyEast Records); The Traveller Across Dimensions – Ben&Ben (Ben&Ben Music / Sony Music Philippines)
**Male Pop Artist of the Year**: **Maki – "Dilaw" (Tarsier Records)**; Amiel Sol – "Sa Bawat Sandali" (Ivory Music); Arthur Miguel – "MU" (Warner Music Philippines); Darren Espanto – "Iyo" (Star Music); Dionela – "Sining" (UMG Philippines); James Reid – "Mirasol" (Careless/Sony Music Philippines); Rob Deniel – "Happy Ending" (Viva Records); TJ Monterde – "Sariling Mundo" (PolyEast Records)	**Female Pop Artist of the Year**: **Jayda Avanzado – "Right Lover, Wrong Time" (UMG Philippines)**; Angeline Quinto – "Salamat Ika'y Dumating" (Star Music); Atasha Muhlach – "Love Story Kong Bitin" (Viva Records); Janine Berdin – "Alas Dos" (UMG Philippines); KZ Tandingan – "Toyo" (Star Music); Morissette – "Wishing Well" (Underdog Music PH); Zephanie – Kung Ang Puso (UMG Philippines)

=== Rock, Rap, RnB and Acoustic category ===
**Rock Album of the Year †**: discontinued/suspended	**Rock Artist of the Year**: **Sponge Cola – "Tatlong Buwan" (Independent)**; Bandang Lapis – "Itinagong Lihim" (Viva Records); Ely Buendia – "Method Adaptor" (Sony Music Philippines); The Itchyworms – "Bakit Hindi Ka Crush ng Crush Mo" (Star Music); Mayonnaise – "Thanks for Everything" (Sony Music Philippines); Sandwich – "Morena" (PolyEast Records); SunKissed Lola – Olaholah (Ditto Music)
**RnB Male Artist of the Year**: **Kris Lawrence – "Within" (Vehnee Saturno Music)**; Bugoy Drilon – "Hilom" (Independent); Iñigo Pascual – "Kahit Di Mo Ko Nakikita 2" (UMG Philippines); James Reid – "Hurt Me Too" (Careless/Sony Music Philippines); Kyle Echarri – "Believe" (Cornerstone Entertainment); Michael Pacquiao – "Time's Up" (Oblivion Paradise); Stell – "Room" (Warner Music Philippines)	**RnB Female Artist of the Year**: **Zela – "Pogi Boy" (AQ Prime Music)**; Dia Maté – "Ganda-Gandahan" – "Wishing Well" (Radical Music); Janah Zaplan – "I Luv U" (StarPop); Janella Salvador – "Hey You" (Star Music); Karylle – MT (Independent); Klarisse de Guzman – "Minamahal Pa Rin Ako" (StarPop); Marion Aunor – "Laruan" (Wild Dream Records); Princess Velasco – "Akala Ko Tayong Dalawa" (Sunshine Entertainment)
**Rap Album of the Year**: **"Drugs" – Shanti Dope (Universal Records)**; "7sins" – Felip (Warner Music Philippines); "Backshots" – Waiian (Sony Music Philippines); "Bahay Namin Maliit Lamang" – Hev Abi (Downtown Q' Entertainment); "Bludevl" – Hellmerry (Young God Records Philippines); "Morenita" – Illest Morena (Independent); "Sari-Sari Story" – Gloc-9 (Universal Records)	**Rap Artist of the Year**: **Illest Morena – "Morenita" (Independent / TMP Industries)**; Alex Bruce – "Fall Season" (UMG Philippines); Flow G – "Burgis" (Panty Droppaz League); Gloc-9 – "Sari-Sari Story" (Universal Records); Hev Abi – "Bahay Namin Maliit Lang" (Downtown Q' Entertainment); Shanti Dope – "I Dior U" (Universal Records); Skusta Clee – "Low Key" (Saucy Island)
**Male Acoustic Artist of the Year**: **Juan Karlos – "Tanga Mo Juan" (Sony Music Philippines)**; Amiel Sol – "Sa Bawat Sandali" (Ivory Music); Benedict Cua – "Di Namalayan" (Independent); Kyle Raphael – "BB" (Independent); Leyo – "Pahinga" (Independent); Noel Cabangon– "Aking Diwata" (Star Music); TJ Monterde – "Sariling Mundo" (Independent)	**Female Acoustic Artist of the Year**: **Angela Ken – "Kulimlim" (Tarsier Records)**; Acel Bisa – "Be Still" (Acel Music); Janine Teñoso – "Apat na Buwan" (Vicor Music); Keiko Necesario – "Inay" (Independent); Melissa Corpus – "Susugal" (Cre8Music Records); Moira Dela Torre – "San Ka Na" (UMG Philippines); Nixx Santos – "Moo" (Holens Music Publishing); Sam Benwick – I Like You I Do (Vicor Music)
**Collaboration of the Year**: **"Hanggang Dulo" – Jos Garcia and Nolo Lopez (Stardom Music Production); and**; **"Palagi" – TJ Monterde and KZ Tandingan (Independent) (tied)**; "Believe" – Kyle Echarri and Illest Morena (Cornerstone Entertainment / Urban Dept. / Coke Studio Philippines); "Kalakal" – SB19 and Gloc-9 (Sony Music Philippines); "Kasama" – Flow G and Chito Miranda (Independent); "Ligaw" – Jet and Jay R (Homeworkz Entertainment Services); "Sikulo" – Angela Ken, Maki, and Nhiko (Tarsier Records)	**Inspirational Song of the Year**: **"Pagmamahal sa Tinubuang Lupa" – Kayla Acosta, Kamilla Acosta, Enoch Casiño, Emilio David, and Ephraim Maglaque (Independent); and**; **"Ningas ng Pag-asa" – Jamie Rivera (Inspire Music) (tied)**; "Bawat Hakbang" – Divino Rivera (Viva Records); "Face of God" – December Avenue (Tower of Doom Music); "Inay" – Keiko Necesario (Independent); "Karapat-dapat" – Kakai Bautista (StarPop); "Lampara" – Press Hit Play (Superbus Entertainment); "Sagot Sa Aking Dasal" – Erik Santos (Star Music)

=== Novelty category ===
**Novelty Song of the Year †**: -	**Novelty Artist of the Year †**: -

=== Album category ===
**Dance Album of the Year †**: -	**Revival Album of the Year †**: -

=== Recording category ===
**Dance Recording of the Year +**: **"Salamin, Salamin" – Bini (Star Music); and**; **"Say Whatcha Wanna Say" – Bilib (AQ Prime Music) (tied)**; "Ganda-Gandahan" – Dia Maté (Radical Music); "Hiraya" – Alamat (Viva Records); "I Luv U" – Janah Zaplan (StarPop); "Limitless" – G22 (Cornerstone Entertainment); "Patintero" – BGYO (Star Music)	**Revival Recording of the Year +**: **"Ipagpatawad Mo" – Khel Pangilinan (M Music Live)**; "Di Sinasadya" – Regine Velasquez (Star Music); "Himala" – Ronnie Liang (Viva Records); "Kapag Ako'y Nagmahal" – Jolina Magdangal (Star Music); "Magbalik" – Lily (Universal Records); "Mr. Right" – Angeline Quinto (Star Music); "Sana Ay Malaman Mo" – Daryl Ong (OQpied Records); "Tell Me" – Martin Nievera (Vicor Music)

=== Christmas category ===
**Christmas Song of the Year +**
- **"Rainbow Christmas" – Vice Ganda (Star Music)**
  - "Christmas With You" – Isha Ponti (Independent)
  - "Christmas Without You" – Diane de Mesa (DDM Studio Production)
  - "Macho Na Si Santa" – Masculados (Universal Records)
  - "Ngayong Pasko" – Andrea Gutierrez (Indiepinoy)
  - "Paano Ngayong Pasko" – Annrain (StarPop)
  - "Pasko Sa Ating Puso" – InnerVoices (Star Records / Kalesa Entertainment)

=== Concert category ===
**Concert of the Year**: **Pagtatag! World Tour (Manila) – SB19**; **Justin de Dios, director; 1Z Entertainment, producer**; Juan Karlos: Live – Juan Karlos; Paolo Valenciano, director; Nathan Studios, producer; Ogieoke 2: Reimagined – Ogie Alcasid; Paolo Bustamante, director; A Team and Viva Live, producer; Pure Energy: One More Time – Gary Valenciano; Paolo Valenciano, director; Manila Genesis, producer; Regine Rocks: The Repeat – Regine Velasquez; Paolo Valenciano and Cacai Mitra, directors; iMusic Entertainment, producer; Sariling Mundo – TJ Monterde; John Prats, director; TJ Monterde and EKG Productions, producers; Seatbelts On! – Cup of Joe; Paolo Valenciano, director; Viva Live, producer; The King 4-Ever – Martin Nievera; Dudz Teraña, director; A Team and iMusic Entertainment, producers	**Male Concert Performer of the Year**: **TJ Monterde – Sariling Mundo Concert (Cornerstone Concerts and EKG Productions)**; Arthur Nery – Solo Concert (Viva Live and Viva Records); Dingdong Avanzado – The Original Prince of Pinoy Pop (Independent); Gary Valenciano – Pure Energy – One More Time (Manila Genesis Entertainment and Management Inc.); Juan Karlos – Live @ MOA Arena (Nathan Studios Inc.); Martin Nievera – The King 4-Ever (ATeam and iMusic Entertainment); Ogie Alcasid – Ogieoke 2 (A Team)
**Female Concert Performer of the Year**: **Regine Velasquez – Regine Rocks: The Repeat (iMusic Entertainment)**; Belle Mariano – Believe (ABS-CBN Events, StarPop, Star Magic and Rise Artist Studio); Julie Anne San Jose – Ang Ating Tinig (GMA Synergy, GMA Entertainment Group and 1Z Entertainment); Laarni Lozada – Groovin' with the Champions (Bentria Productions); Nina – Love Nina (Ticket1 Concerts); Odette Quesada – Love Q&A (ATeam, NY Entourage Productions and Q Productions); Pops Fernandez – Always Loved (DSL Productions); Sitti – Sitti-Scape: The City of Bossa (Fire and Ice Live)	**Duo/Group Concert of the Year**: **SB19 – Pagtatag! World Tour (Manila) (1Z Entertainment, Black Star Entertainment Productions and KDR Music House)**; Alamat – Ragasa: The Concert (Viva Live and Viva Records); Ben&Ben – The Traveller Across Dimensions (Ovations Productions); Cup of Joe – Seatbelts On! (Viva Live); December Avenue – Sa Ilalim Ng Mga Bituin (NSYSHOWS); Over October – Ikot Sa Music Museum (Underdog Music PH); Rivermaya – The Reunion Concert (Live Nation Philippines)

=== Special awards ===
**Pilita Corrales Lifetime Achievement Award**
- **Celeste Legaspi**
- **Andrew E.**
**Gawad Parangal Levi Celerio**
- **Mon del Rosario**
**Mga Natatanging Alagad ng Musikang Pilipino**
- **The Rainmakers**

==== Other special awards ====
Eight personalities received special citations from PMPC.

- **Most Outstanding Public Servant and Actor of the Year –** Daniel Fernando
- **Community Hero Influencer of the Year –** Boss Toyo
- **New Teen Idol Sweetheart of the Year –** Isha Ponti
- **Music Legacy and Excellence Award 2026 –** Emma Cordero
- **Breakthrough Female Singer and Actress of the Year –** Charina Carmen
- **Breakthrough P-Pop Group Artist of the Year –** Blue Dreamers PH
- **Excellence in Law and Academy Award –** Atty. Ernelson Trojillo
- **Most Outstanding Legal Advocate –** Atty. Persida Rueda-Acosta

==== Playtime Fan Favorite Award ====
- SB19

==== Stars of the Night ====
- Male Star of the Night: Dylan Menor
- Female Star of the Night: Moira Dela Torre

==== Celebrities of the Night ====
- Male Celebrity of the Night: James Reid
- Female Celebrity of the Night: Jayda Avanzado

== Multiple nominations ==
9 nominations

- TJ Monterde

6 nominations

- Bini

5 nominations

- Cup of Joe
- SB19

4 nominations

- Ben&Ben
- James Reid
- Lola Amour
- Maki

3 nominations

- Amiel Sol
- Dia Mate
- Dionela
- Gloc-9
- Ice Seguerra
- Illest Morena
- Janah Zaplan
- Juan Karlos
- KZ Tandingan
- Martin Nievera
- Moira Dela Torre
- Regine Velasquez

== Multiple wins ==
3 wins

- SB19 (Music Video of the Year, Duo/Group Concert of the Year, and Concert of the Year)

2 wins

- Bini (Dance Recording of the Year and Pop Album of the Year)
- Maki (Male Pop Artist of the Year and Song of the Year)
- TJ Monterde (Male Concert Performer of the Year and Male Recording Artist of the Year)
