= WYAT (Where You At) =

2022 single by SB19

Single by SB19
- Released: September 2, 2022
- Recorded: 2022
- Genre: Disco; funk; dance-pop
- Length: 3:39
- Label: Sony
- Songwriter: John Paulo Nase
- Producers: John Paulo Nase; Joshua Daniel Nase

SB19 singles chronology
| "Ligaya" (2021) | "WYAT (Where You At)" (2022) | "Nyebe" (2022) |

Music video
- "WYAT (Where You At)" on YouTube

"WYAT (Where You At)" (also written as "WYAT") is a song by Filipino boy band SB19. John Paulo Nase wrote the song and produced it with his brother. Sony Music Philippines released "WYAT" as a single on September 2, 2022. It is a disco-pop-produced song with lyrics about reconnecting with people, and it is about going back to how it was: talking and meeting actual people, doing things together, re-creating the feeling before the life today. It was highlighting the group's ability to grow and how their music evolve through the times.

Jireh Christian Bacasno directed the music video for "WYAT (Where You At)" and Justin de Dios is the creative director. It premiered on YouTube on September 2, 2022. The music video is a retro concept set in 70s, ’80s, and ’90s eras, reconnecting with people from the past and going back to the era that people are not heavily dependent on modern communications devices. An era that actual people can talk and meet and doing things together.

SB19 performed "WYAT" on multiple occasions. On television, they performed the song on ASAP Natin 'To, on Wowowin, launching of ALLTV, on noontime variety show It's Showtime and to the longest running variety show in the Philippines, Eat Bulaga!. "WYAT" was also included on the set list of their concert Where You At World Tour (2022).

== Background and composition ==
John Paulo Nase wrote "WYAT" and co-produced it with his brother Joshua Daniel Nase. Thyro Alfaro mixed the song while Greentea bro by Realbros Sound Studio Korea did the mastering. "Where You At" is three minutes and thirty-nine seconds long. Media outlets described "WYAT" as a disco-pop-produced, with edm classic rock-disco-infused, and funk, fusion, groove song. "WYAT" also features the SB19's signature hard-hitting beats, high tension, and high energy style.

"WYAT" reflects the humility of the group. As Pablo stated in the interview with Billboard:

“This song is about reconnecting with people. It's different when you go out, meet people, do interesting things — climb a mountain! I would give everything to go back to the situation before where you're not worrying if someone coughs. The song is about going back to how it was: talking and meeting actual people, doing things together, just re-creating the feeling we had before.”

— Pablo, billboard.com

== Release and promotion ==
For the first whole week of August, SB19 has been teasing their comeback. On August 12, SB19 released the single comeback title "WYAT" (Where You At), a disco-pop song that highlights the urgency of disconnection to reconnection of the times that should be releasing on September 2 with an official music video and a global concert tour kickoff in Manila on September 17 in Araneta Coliseum. The group's social media, especially Twitter, has erupted over the last few days after the boy group released a series of cryptic riddles and videos that led fans to speculate about a world tour. As a result, the hashtag #WhereIsSB19 has been trending on Twitter worldwide daily. SB19 released their final video of the series announcing that the single and tour will be launched in September.

On September 2, they released the music video for their comeback single "WYAT" (Where You At), from which the tour name was derived from.

== Accolades ==
Awards and nominations for "WYAT (Where You At)"
| Award | Year | Category | Result | Ref. |
|---|---|---|---|---|
| Awit Awards | 2023 | Record of the Year | Nominated | |
| Awit Awards | 2023 | Song of the Year | Nominated | |
| Awit Awards | 2023 | Best Performance by a Group Recording Artist | Nominated | |
| Awit Awards | 2023 | Best Dance/Electronic Recording | Won | |
| Awit Awards | 2023 | Music Video of the Year | Nominated | |
| Nylon Manila Big Bold Brave Awards | 2023 | Gen-Z Approved Hit | Won | |
| P-pop Music Awards | 2022 | Philippine Pop Song of the Year | Won | |
| PMPC Star Awards for Music | 2024 | Music Video of the Year | Won | |
| Wish 107.5 Music Awards | 2023 | Wish Pop Song of the Year | Won | |

== Music video ==
The music video was directed by Jireh Christian Bacasno through the creative direction of the band's sub-vocalist Justin, which was released on the same release date as the official audio on September 2, 2022. In the video, the members "showcased their singing and dancing skills while grooving to their retro styled outfits" designed for the concept. The design and theme of the music video was set in 70s, ’80s, and ’90s eras. The music video was inspired by retro life, a disco era. The retro-themed music video amplifies that dream to capture boundaries and generations, a trip to memory lane and to the futuristic era of our own music. "WYAT" is an encouragement to reconnect with the wonders of the past.

== Credits and personnel ==
Credits are adapted from Tidal and the song's music video.

- SB19 – main vocals
- John Paulo Nase – writer, producer
- Joshua Daniel Nase – producer
- Thyro Alfaro – mixing
- Greentea bro Realbros Sound Studio Korea – mixing and mastering
- Stellvester Ajero – choreography
- Justin de Dios - creative director
