= WYAT (Where You At) Tour =

2022 concert tour by SB19

- Tour by SB19
- Poster for the tour's Araneta Coliseum show
- Location: Asia; North America
- Start date: September 17, 2022
- End date: December 18, 2022
- No. of shows: 10

SB19 concert chronology
- WYAT (Where You At) Tour (2022); Pagtatag! World Tour (2023)

WYAT (Where You At) Tour was the first major concert tour headlined by Filipino boy band SB19. Commenced on September 17, 2022, in Quezon City, the tour consisted of 10 shows across Asia and North America.

== Background ==
For the first whole week of August, SB19 has been teasing their comeback. On August 12, SB19 released the single comeback title "WYAT (Where You At)", a disco-pop song that highlights the urgency of disconnection to reconnection of the times that should be releasing on September 2 with an official music video and a global concert tour kickoff in Manila on September 17 in Araneta Coliseum. The group's social media, especially Twitter, has erupted over the last few days after the boy group released a series of cryptic riddles and videos that led fans to speculate about a world tour. As a result, the hashtag #WhereIsSB19 has been trending on Twitter worldwide daily. SB19 released their final video of the series announcing that the single and tour will be launched in September. Few cities in the Philippines were included on the tours after Quezon City Metro Manila. The group announced the remaining concert dates for Clark City, Cebu City and Davao City on September 4, 2022. After which, the band will bring the concert internationally with additional tour dates placed for Singapore, UAE and United States. Member, Josh revealed that this would be their first time holding their own concert overseas and expressed his excitement to meet their international fans. The group also teases more additional leg for the tour which is still unannounced.

== Marketing ==
On August 18, 2022, the group released the official poster for the world tour in their Facebook account officially announcing its kick-off at the Smart Araneta Coliseum. On September 2, they released the music video for their comeback single "WYAT (Where You At)", from which the tour name was derived from. This is SB19's first comeback since the release of their EP Pagsibol in 2021. On September 4, a one-minute teaser has been uploaded in their Twitter account, unveiling the confirmed cities and dates for the tour. The first show held at Smart Araneta Coliseum was sold out within 24 hours after ticket released to the general public.

== Accolades ==
Awards and nominations for WYAT (Where You At) Tour
| Award | Year | Category | Result | Ref. |
|---|---|---|---|---|
| PMPC Star Awards for Music | 2024 | Concert of the Year | Nominated | |

== Set list ==
The following set list is from the September 17, 2022 show in Quezon City. It is not representative of all shows throughout the tour.

1. "What?"
2. "Mana"
3. "Hanggang sa Huli"
4. "Nyebe"
5. "Attention"
6. "Bazinga"
7. "Mapa"
8. "Alab (Burning)"
9. "Tilaluha"
10. "Bakit Ba Ikaw"
11. "WYAT (Where You At)"
12. "Love Yours" (with Ohwon Lee)
13. "Go Up"
14. "SLMT"

== Shows ==
List of concert tour dates, showing city, country, and venue
| Date (2022) | City | Country | Venue |
|---|---|---|---|
| September 17 | Quezon City | Philippines | Araneta Coliseum |
| October 1 | Cebu City | Philippines | Waterfront Cebu City Hotel & Casino |
| October 8 | Angeles (Note: Promoted as Clark.) | Philippines | SMX Convention Center Clark |
| October 15 | Davao City | Philippines | SMX Convention Center Davao |
| October 29 | Dubai | United Arab Emirates | Dubai World Trade Centre |
| November 5 | New York City | United States | Palladium Times Square |
| November 12 | Los Angeles | United States | Avalon Hollywood |
| November 18 | Redwood City (Note: Promoted as San Francisco.) | United States | Fox Theatre |
| November 27 | Singapore | | Resorts World Sentosa |
| December 18 | Quezon City | Philippines | Araneta Coliseum |
