= P-pop Music Awards =

Accolade by the P-pop Artists League

- Previous: P-pop Music Awards 2025; November 29, 2025
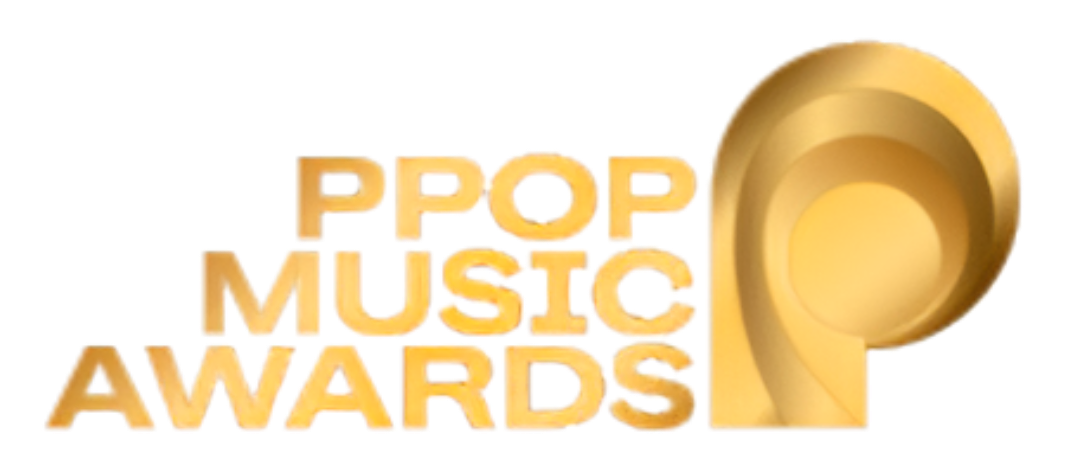
- Awarded for: Honoring the best of Filipino music
- Country: Philippines
- Presented by: P-pop Artist League
- First award: November 26, 2016; 9 years ago
- Website: Official website

The P-pop Music Awards (stylized as PPOP Awards), also known as the Philippine Popular Music Awards, are Filipino music awards presented by the P-pop Artists League. It was founded in 2016 by Jhon Mark "Yuan" Quiblat, an advocate for Filipino music. It usually takes place in the last week of November annually (with the exception of the 9th P-pop Awards, which was held on December 28, 2024).

== History ==
The P-pop Awards were founded in 2016 by Jhon Mark "Yuan" Quiblat, an advocate for Filipino music. In the awards show's first year, its presenter P-pop League declared the last week of November to be the National Week for Young Filipino Artists, during which the P-pop Awards take place.

=== 1st P-pop Music Awards (2016) ===
The first ceremony took place on November 26, 2016, at the Rizal Park Open-Air Auditorium in Manila, Philippines. Then known as the P-pop Entertainment Awards (stylized in all caps), the ceremony was presented by the P-pop Artists League and held in partnership with the National Parks Development Committee and the Department of Tourism.

=== 4th P-pop Music Awards (2019) ===
The fourth ceremony took place in Pasig City on November 29, 2019. It was co-presented by Zed Philippines and the mobile voting platform LetsVote.PH.

=== 5th P-pop Music Awards (2020) ===
Amid the COVID-19 pandemic, the 5th P-pop Awards continued, though the organizers stated that they were not sure if they could hold the awards ceremony in a real venue.

=== 7th P-pop Music Awards (2022) ===
The 7th P-pop Awards were held at the Rizal Park Open-Air Auditorium, with the theme "POPasikatin Natin Ang Sariling Atin" (transl. Let's Make Our Own Music Popular).

=== 8th P-pop Music Awards (2023) ===
The 8th P-pop Awards took place on November 30, 2023 at the Rizal Park Open-Air Auditorium. Admission to the event was free. Jia Bote of the Daily Tribune noted that Filipino boy band SB19 won the most awards in this edition.

=== 9th P-pop Music Awards (2024) ===
The ninth ceremony was held on December 28, 2024, at the New Frontier Theater.

=== 10th P-pop Music Awards (2025) ===
The 10th anniversary of the P-pop Awards was held on November 29, 2025, at the Metropolitan Theater. The 2025 ceremony was presented by the P-pop Artists League and JuanCast. The event included partnerships with the National Commission for Culture and the Arts (NCCA), the National Youth Commission, and the Organisasyon ng Pilipinong Mang-aawit (lit. 'Organization of Filipino Singers'). The eligibility period for the 10th awards covered releases and appearances from November 2024 to November 2025.

=== 11th P-pop Music Awards (2026) ===
The 11th anniversary of the P-pop Awards was held on October 18, 2026.
