= List of newspapers in the Philippines =

This list of newspapers currently being published in the Philippines includes broadsheets and tabloids published daily and distributed nationwide. Regional newspapers or those published in the regions are also included. Almost all broadsheets published nationwide are in English; most tabloids are published in Tagalog.

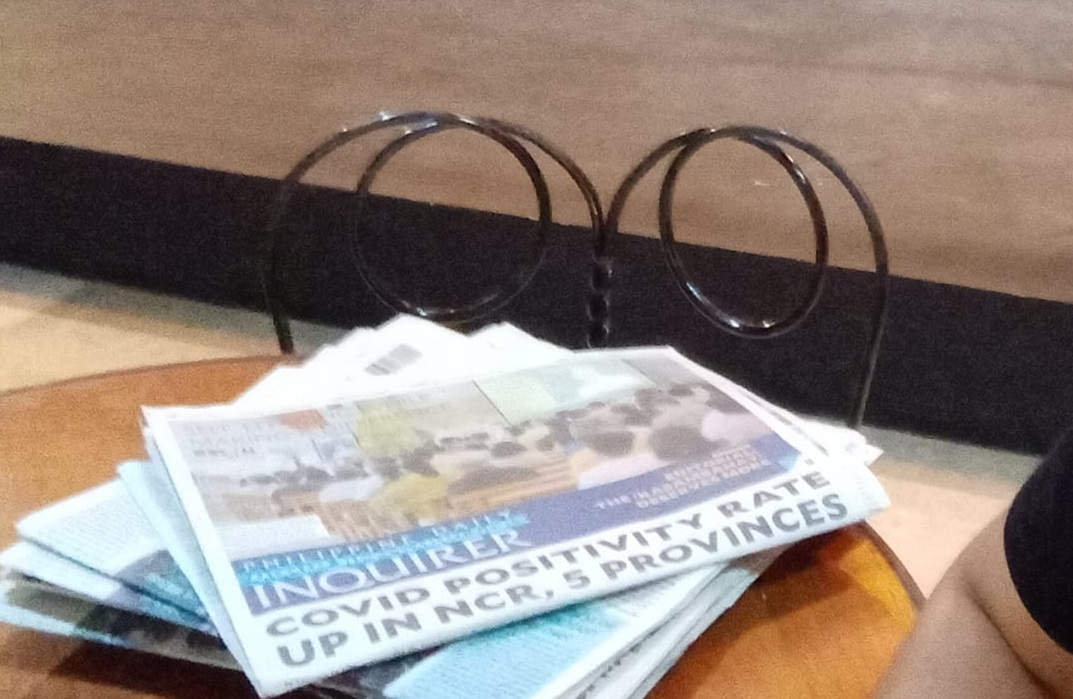
The Inquirer, Bulletin, Star, and Times were the available broadsheets at the NCCA in 2022

== Broadsheets ==
| Newspaper | Language | Type | Circulation |
|---|---|---|---|
| BusinessMirror | English | Business daily | National |
| BusinessWorld | English | Business daily | National |
| Daily Tribune | English | Daily broadsheet | National |
| Malaya | English | Daily broadsheet | National |
| Manila Bulletin | English | Daily broadsheet | National |
| Manila Standard | English | Daily broadsheet | National |
| The Manila Times | English | Daily broadsheet | National |
| The Market Monitor | English | Business weekly | National |
| Philippine Daily Inquirer | English | Daily broadsheet | National |
| The Philippine Star | English | Daily broadsheet | National |
| United News | English | Daily broadsheet | National |
| SunStar | English | Daily broadsheet | National |

== Online only ==
| Name | Language | Type | Area reporting covers |
|---|---|---|---|
| Agritech PH | English/Filipino | Daily | National |
| ABS-CBN News | English/Filipino | Daily | National |
| Bravo Filipino | English/Filipino | Daily | National |
| Bilyonaryo | English/Filipino | Daily | National |
| Bulatlat | English | Daily | National |
| Cebu Chronicle | English | Daily | Regional |
| Cebu Daily News (CDN Digital) | English | Daily | Regional |
| Davao Today | English | Daily | Regional |
| Diario de Manila | English/Filipino | Daily | National |
| Diariong Tagalog | Filipino | Daily | National |
| Diyaryo Milenyo Digital News | English/Filipino | Daily | Regional |
| Executive Chronicles | English | Daily | National |
| Foodfinds Asia | English | Daily | National |
| GMA News Online | English/Filipino | Daily | National |
| Headline News PH | English | Daily | National |
| Headlines PH | English | Daily | National |
| I Love Tacloban | Waray | Daily | National |
| Interaksyon | English | Daily | National |
| Mindanao Chronicle | English | Daily | Regional |
| Mindanao Herald | English | Daily | Regional |
| Negosentro | English | Daily | National |
| News5 | English | Daily | National |
| NewsWatch Plus | English/Filipino | Daily | National |
| The Philippine Business and News | English | Daily | National |
| Philippine Daily Mirror | English | Daily | National |
| The Philippines Herald - since 1920 | English | Daily | National |
| Rappler | English | Daily | National |
| SunStar Manila | English | Daily | National |
| World Executives Digest | English | Daily | National |
| World Headlines PH | English | Daily | National |
| Yo Manila | English/Filipino | Daily | National |
| POLITIKO | English | Daily | National |
| Bilyonaryo | English | Daily | National |
| Asul TV | English/Filipino | Daily | National |
| Daily Sun Chronicle | English | Daily | National |

== Tabloids ==
| Newspaper | Language | Type | Circulation |
|---|---|---|---|
| Abante | Tagalog | Tabloid | National |
| Abante Tonite | Tagalog | Tabloid | National |
| Agila ng Bayan | Tagalog | Tabloid | National |
| Bagong Sagad Ngayon | Tagalog | Tabloid | National |
| Bagong Toro | Tagalog | Tabloid | National |
| Balita | Tagalog | Tabloid | National |
| Balita Central | Tagalog | Bi-monthly tabloid | National |
| Bandera | Tagalog | Tabloid | National |
| Bistado | Tagalog | Weekly tabloid | National |
| Bulgar | Tagalog | Tabloid | National |
| Diaryo Bomba | Tagalog | Tabloid | National |
| Hataw | Tagalog | Tabloid | National |
| Kadyot | Tagalog | Tabloid | National |
| Pang-Masa | Tagalog | Tabloid | National |
| People's Balita | Tagalog | Tabloid | National |
| People's Journal | English | Tabloid | National |
| People's Tonight | English | Tabloid | National |
| Pilipino Mirror | Tagalog | Tabloid | National |
| Pilipino Star Ngayon | Tagalog | Tabloid | National |
| Pinas | Tagalog | Tabloid | National |
| Pinoy Paparazzi | Tagalog | Tabloid | National |
| Pinoy Weekly | Tagalog | Weekly tabloid | National |
| Police Files Tonite | Tagalog | Tabloid | National |
| Remate | Tagalog | Tabloid | National |
| Saksi Ngayon | Tagalog | Tabloid | National |
| Tempo | English | Tabloid | National |
| X-Files | Tagalog | Tabloid | National |
| NewsKo | Tagalog | Tabloid | National |

== Regional and community newspapers ==
| Name | Languages | Format | Circulation |
|---|---|---|---|
| Baguio Midland Courier | English | Tabloid | Regional |
| Banat | Cebuano | Tabloid | Regional |
| The Bicol Chronicle | English/Bikol | Tabloid | Regional |
| Bicol Informer | Bikol | Tabloid | Regional |
| Bicol Mail | Bikol | Tabloid | Regional |
| Bicol Peryodiko | Tagalog | Tabloid | Regional |
| The Bicol Regional Weekly Digest | English/Bikol | Tabloid | Regional |
| Bicol Standard | Bikol | Tabloid | Regional |
| The Bohol Chronicle | English | Tabloid | Regional |
| The Bohol Standard | English | Tabloid | Regional |
| Bohol Times | Cebuano | Tabloid | Regional |
| Brigada News | Cebuano | Tabloid | Regional |
| Business Week Mindanao | English | Tabloid | Regional |
| Cagayan de Oro Journal | English | Tabloid | Regional |
| Cagayan de Oro Times | English | Tabloid | Regional |
| The Cagayan Times | English | Tabloid | Regional |
| Catanduanes Tribune | Bikol | Tabloid | Regional |
| Cebu Examiner | English | Tabloid | Regional |
| The Daily Dipolognon | English | Tabloid | Regional |
| Daily Guardian | English/Hiligaynon | Tabloid | Regional |
| The Daily Sun | English | Tabloid | Regional |
| Eastern Visayas Examiner | Waray | Tabloid | Regional |
| Eastern Visayas Mail | Waray | Tabloid | Regional |
| The Filipino Connection | English | Tabloid | Regional |
| The Filipino Express | English | Tabloid | Regional |
| The Freeman | English | Tabloid | Regional |
| Golden Journal | English | Tabloid | Regional |
| Hublas nga Kamatuoran | Cebuano | Tabloid | Regional |
| Ilocos Sentinel | English | Weekly tabloid | Regional |
| The Ilocos Times | English | Weekly tabloid | Regional |
| Iloilo Metropolitan Times | English | Weekly tabloid | Regional |
| Isabela Star | English/Ilocano | Weekly tabloid | Regional |
| Island Observer | English/Tagalog | Weekly tabloid | Regional |
| La Union Herald | English/Ilocano | Weekly tabloid | Regional |
| Latigo Weekly Newspaper | Tagalog/English | Weekly tabloid | Regional |
| Leyte-Samar Daily Express | Waray | Broadsheet | Regional |
| Libre | Tagalog | Tabloid | Regional |
| Maguindanao Network | English | Tabloid | Regional |
| Manila Channel | English | Tabloid | Regional |
| The Mayon Times | English/Bikol | Tabloid | Regional |
| Metro Cebu News | English | Business | Regional |
| Metronews Bulacan | English | Weekly tabloid | Regional |
| Mindanao Cross | English | Tabloid | Regional |
| Mindanao Daily News | English | Tabloid | Regional |
| Mindanao Examiner | English | Tabloid | Regional |
| Mindanao Gold Star Daily | English | Tabloid | Regional |
| Mindanao Star | English | Tabloid | Regional |
| Mindanao Times | English | Tabloid | Regional |
| MindaNews | English | Tabloid | Regional |
| Mindoro Bulletin | English | Tabloid | Regional |
| MLDC Valley Times | English/Ilocano | Weekly tabloid | Regional |
| Moro Information Agency | English | Tabloid | Regional |
| The Negros Chronicle | English | Weekly tabloid | Regional |
| The News Today | English | Tabloid | Regional |
| Northern Dispatch | English/Ilocano | Weekly tabloid | Regional |
| The Northern Forum Cagayan Valley | English | Tabloid | Regional |
| Northern Light | English/Ilocano | Weekly tabloid | Regional |
| Olongapo News | English | Tabloid | Regional |
| Operation Exposé | Tagalog | Tabloid | Regional |
| Palawan Daily News | Tagalog | Tabloid | Regional |
| Palawan News | English/Tagalog | Online Daily/Weekly Newspaper | Regional |
| Panay News | Hiligaynon | Tabloid | Regional |
| Periodiko Metro | English | Tabloid | Regional |
| Pinoy Parazzi | English | Tabloid | Regional |
| Punto! Central Luzon | English | Tabloid | Regional |
| The Reporter | Cebuano | Tabloid | Regional |
| Samar News | Waray | Tabloid | Regional |
| Sinirangan News | Waray | Tabloid | Regional |
| Southern Leyte Times | Cebuano | Tabloid | Regional |
| Subic Updater | English | Tabloid | Regional |
| Sunday Punch | English | Tabloid | Regional |
| SunStar Bacolod | English | Daily tabloid | Regional |
| SunStar Baguio | English | Daily tabloid | Regional |
| SunStar Cagayan de Oro | English | Daily tabloid | Regional |
| SunStar Cebu | English | Daily tabloid | Regional |
| SunStar Davao | English | Daily tabloid | Regional |
| SunStar Pampanga | English | Daily tabloid | Regional |
| SuperBalita Cagayan de Oro | Cebuano | Daily tabloid | Regional |
| SuperBalita Cebu | Cebuano | Daily tabloid | Regional |
| SuperBalita Davao | Cebuano | Daily tabloid | Regional |
| Urduja Mirror | English/Ilocano | Weekly tabloid | Regional |
| Vigan Chronicle | English/Ilocano | Weekly tabloid | Regional |
| Visayan Business Post | English/Cebuano | Tabloid | Regional |
| Visayan Daily Star | English | Tabloid | Regional |
| Voice of the South | English | Tabloid | Regional |
| Zambo Times | English | Tabloid | Regional |
| Zamboanga Today | English | Tabloid | Regional |

== Foreign-language newspapers ==
=== Spanish ===
- La Jornada Filipina
- Semanario de Filipinas
- Revista Filipina

=== Mandarin Chinese ===
- Chinese Commercial News (菲律賓商報)
- Philippine Chinese Daily (菲律賓華報)
- Sino-Fil Daily (菲華日報)
- Ta Kung Pao - Philippine edition (大公報 - 菲律賓版)
- United Daily News (聯合日報)
- Wen Wei Po - Philippine edition (文匯報 - 菲律賓版)
- World News (世界日報)

=== Japanese ===
- Manila Shimbun

=== Korean ===
- Ilyo Sinmun
- Manila Seoul
- News Gate
- Weekly Manila
