= List of newspapers published in Metro Manila =

This is a list of newspapers published in Metro Manila. Metro Manila has four major English-language daily papers: the Manila Bulletin, The Manila Times, the Philippine Daily Inquirer, and The Philippine Star.

== Broadsheets ==
- BusinessMirror
- BusinessWorld
- Chinese Commercial News
- Daily Tribune
- Global Daily Mirror
- Malaya
- Manila Bulletin
- Manila Shimbun
- Manila Standard
- The Manila Times
- The Market Monitor
- The Philippine Chronicle
- Philippine Daily Inquirer
- The Philippine Star
- United Daily News

== Online ==
- ABS-CBN News
- Bulgar Online
- GMA News
- News5
- Kicker Daily News
- Manila Seoul
- PressOne.PH
- Rappler
- SunStar Manila
- World Headlines PH
- World News PH

== Tabloids ==
- Abante
- Abante Tonite
- Agila ng Bayan
- Bagong Sagad Ngayon
- Bagong Sagad sa Balita at Impormasyon Ngayon
- Bagong Tiktik
- Bagong Toro
- Balita
- Bandera
- Bomba Balita
- Bulgar
- Diyaryo Pinoy (Free Paper)
- Hataw
- Inquirer Libre
- Kadyot Bawat Report May Sundot
- Llamado
- Metro Daily
- Metro Manila Today
- Pang-Masa
- People's Journal
- People's Monitor
- People's Tonight
- Pilipino Mirror
- Pilipino Star Ngayon
- Pinas
- Largabistang Pinoy
- Pinoy Parazzi
- Pinoy Weekly
- Police Files Tonite
- Ratsada
- Remate
- Saksi sa Balita
- Sikat
- Taliba
- Tanod
- Tempo
- The Business Express
- The Daily Sun
- The Philippines Observer: Kontra
- Tumbok

== Magazines ==
- Astro Horoscope Feng Shui
- Astro Horoscope Lucky Charms
- Ating Alamin Gazette
- Bannawag
- Bisaya
- Eksena
- Famous Spot Magazine
- Hiligaynon
- The Jeepney Magazine
- Liwayway
- Magnegosyo Tayo
- Moviestar Magasin
- The Philippine Panorama
- Rising Star Feng Shui
- Rising Star Horoscope
- Rising Star Chinese Horoscope
- Rising Star Horoscope Prediction
- Starweek
- Sunday Inquirer Magazine
- WU! Manila Magazine

== Defunct periodicals ==
=== Newspapers ===
- Ang Kaibigan ng Bayan
- Daily Globe
- Diario de Manila
- El Debate
- La Ilustración Filipina
- La Vanguardia
- Mabuhay
- Manila Chronicle
- Philippines Daily Express
- Philippine Herald
- Times Journal
- Today

=== Tabloids ===
- Banat
- Bosero
- Pinoy Times
- Remate Tonight
- RP Daily Exposé
- Toro
- TIK-TIK

== See also ==
- List of newspapers in the Philippines
