= Sunstar =

Sunstar or Sun Star may refer to:

== Astronomy ==
- The Sun

== Newspapers ==
- Merced Sun-Star in California, United States
- Sun Star (Alaska), a student newspaper in Alaska, United States
- SunStar in the Philippines

- SunStar Cebu
- SunStar Davao
- SunStar Manila

== Biology ==
=== Plants ===
- Ornithogalum dubium, a plant in the family Asparagaceae, subfamily Scilloideae

=== Sea stars ===
- Solaster stimpsoni, a sea star
- Solaster dawsoni, a sea star
- Sunflower sea star (Pycnopodia helianthoides), also known as the sun star or sunflower star

== Other ==
- Sunstar (photography), an optical phenomenon found on photos of bright objects taken with a small aperture
- Sunstar (racehorse), a British racehorse
- Sunstar Group, global health and beauty, chemical, and motorcycle parts conglomerate
- Sunstar, a fictional artifact from Star Wars: Ewoks
- Sunstar, a character from Mega Man V
