= United Daily =

United Daily may refer to:

- United Daily News, a newspaper in Taiwan
- United Daily News (Philippines), a Chinese-language newspaper in the Philippines
  - United News, formerly known as United Daily Press, the English-language edition of United Daily News (Philippines)
- United Daily, a sister newspaper of the Sarawak Tribune, in Malaysia
