= El Debate =

El Debate ("The Debate") refers to several Spanish language news websites and periodicals:

- El Debate (Argentina), Argentinian online newspaper
- El Debate (Manila), a former Filipino newspaper between 1918 and 1970
- El Debate (Mexico), Mexican newspaper
- El Debate (Spain), Spanish newspaper 1910 - 1936
- ElDebate.com, Spanish news website successor to the newspaper
- El Debate (Paraguay), Paraguayan former newspaper, founded in 1937
