= Daily Mirror (disambiguation) =

Daily Mirror may refer to:

- Daily Mirror, a UK newspaper
- Daily Mirror (Sri Lanka), a Sri Lankan newspaper
- Ceylon Daily Mirror, a defunct Ceylonese newspaper
- Global Daily Mirror, a Philippine newspaper
- The Daily Mirror (Sydney), an Australian newspaper
- New York Daily Mirror, a defunct New York City newspaper
- New-York Mirror, a defunct New York City newspaper for which Edgar Allan Poe worked
- The Daily Mirror, the local newspaper in the fictional town of Storybrooke, Maine on the fantasy television series Once Upon a Time.

== See also ==
- Der Tagesspiegel, a German newspaper whose name literally means "The Daily Mirror"
