= Ariel Sotelo Tabag =

Filipino writer (born 1978)

Ariel Sotelo Tabag (b. 1978), is an Ilokano writer, translator, and editor. He has received prizes and grants including the Palanca Awards and NCCA Writers’ Prize for his Ilokano poems, short stories, and novels. He has authored eight Ilokano books. He has also translated notable Ilokano works into Filipino. Two-termer president of GUMIL Filipinas (2023-2027), he edits the literary section of Bannawag, the leading Ilokano magazine. He hails from Santa Teresita, Cagayan.

He plays bass guitar for the Ilokano band Manong Diego (formerly Samtoy).

== Works ==
- Books Authored: Manen, Adda Umuna: Dandaniw (2023), Voice Tape ken Dadduma Pay a Napili a Sarita (2022), Villa ken Dadduma Pay a Sarita (2019), Panangsapul iti Puraw a Kabalio (2017), Kapessat ti Bagis (2016), Panangarakup iti Ipus ti Layap (2016), Ay, Ni Reberen (2013), Karapote ken Dadduma Pay a Sarita (2011)
- Books Co-Authored: Haraya: An Anthology of Essays, Memoirs, Poems and Stories (2022)
- Chapbooks Authored: Sumagmamano a Sarita Maipapan iti Ayat (2022), Sagad (2022), Panagpabus-oy iti Daga ken Dadduma Pay a Daniw (2022), Bangabanga ken Dadduma Pay a Daniw (2017)
- Books Edited/Co-Edited: Iti Labes ti Beddeng (2024), Subbual: Antolohia Dagiti Daniw nga Ilokano (2022), Imbiit: Antolohia Dagiti Ababa a Sarita Dagiti Mannurat iti Cagayan (2022), Apit: Antolohia Dagiti Daniw nga Ilokano (2021), Anasaas: Antolohia Dagiti Daniw Dagiti Mannurat iti Cagayan (2021), Antolohia Dagiti Daniw nga Ilokano (2020), Burayok: Antolohia Dagiti Sarita Dagiti Mannurat iti Cagayan (2019), Antolohia Dagiti Daniw ni Ayat (2016), Dagiti Napili a Kapipintasan a Kabukbukodan a Sarita a Para Ubbing: Umuna a Libro (2014), Bullalayaw ken Dadduma Pay a Daniw a Para Ubbing (2012), Alimpatok: Antolohia Dagiti Erotiko a Daniw nga Ilokano (2012), Nabalitokan a Tawid: Antolohia Dagiti Napili a Sarita nga Ilokano (2011), Kastoy nga Imbunubonmi Dagiti Balikas (2010), 29 a Napili a Sarita iti Iluko (2010).
- Books Translated/Co-Translated: Samtoy: Mga Kuwentong Ilokano (Bagong Edisyon) (2024), Sa Bagani Ubbog: Mga Piling Kuwento ni Reynaldo A. Duque (2021), Sirib ti Puli ni Ilokano. (2021), Dagiti Tay-ak ti Isla Fuga (Isla Fuga: Sacred Scapes) (2021), Buhay ni Lam-ang (Life of Lam-ang) (2019), Tiktaktok ken Pikpakbum (Tiktaktok at Pikpakbum) (2018), Sangapulo nga Aggagayyem (Sampung Magkakaibigan) (2018), Ni Ulaw (Si Wako) (2018), Ni Putot (Si Putot) (2018), Ni Mulagat, ni Kidday, ni Kirem, ni Kidem (Si Dilat, si Kindat, si Kurap, si Pikit) (2018), Ni Lila Apura ken ni Lilo Un Momento (Si Lola Apura at si Lolo Un Momento) (2018), Ania ti Pukistayo Ita? (Anong Gupit Natin Ngayon?) (2018), Don Calixtofano at Natakneng a Panagsalisal, Dalawang Dula ni Mena Pecson Crisologo (2014)

== Grants & Awards ==
- National Book Development Board Trust Fund, Gawad Rolando S. Tinio, Gawad Bienvenido Lumbera, Talaang Ginto-Gantimpalang Collantes, Robinion Literary Awards, Don Carlos Palanca Memorial Awards, ALVIYA Foundation Literary Awards, NCCA Writers Prize, National Book Awards, Gawad KWF sa Tula, Tugade Foundation Awards, Judge Vivencio S. Baclig Awards for Ilokano Literature, Reynald F. Antonio Awards for Ilokano Literature, ATILA, COVVLA, AVAIL, AMMAFLA, SPADE Foundation, GUMIL California, JPIC-AMRSP

== Other Awards ==
- Creative Icons of Cagayan Valley, Dayaw Teresiano (Outstanding Teresiano)
