= Greg Laconsay =

Filipino writer (born 1931)

Gregorio "Greg" C. Laconsay (born March 12, 1931) is a Filipino-Ilocano editor and writer in the Philippines. He was the former editor in chief for two prominent literary magazines in the Philippines, namely the Ilocano-language Bannawag and the Tagalog-language Liwayway.

== Personal life ==
Greg Laconsay was born in Natividad, Pangasinan.

== Literary career ==
In 1966, Laconsay was the chief editor for the magazine Bannawag. He became an assistant director for editorials at Liwayway Publishing, Inc., and later became the full-pledged overall director for the chain of Liwayway publications beginning 1977. He retired in 1991. He received twenty seven major awards and recognition from different organizations in the Philippines and abroad. He also became a member of the Filipino Academy of Movie Arts and Sciences (FAMAS).

== Works ==
=== Dictionaries ===
- Iluko–English–Tagalog Dictionary (1993)
- Simplified Iluko Grammar (2005)

=== Ilocano novels ===
- Ti Kabusor (1974)
- Ti Love Story ni Theresa (1971) – Theresa's Love Story
- Nalagda a Cari (1951)
- Rebelde (1957) – Rebel
- Villa Verde (1959) – Green Valley
- Sacramento (1960) – Sacrament
- Purisima Concepcion (1961) – Immaculate Concepcion
- Kadena Perpetua (1961) – Perpetual Chain
- Kasimpungalan (1962)
- Rupanrupa (1963)
- Ti Ubing nga Agpateg iti Sangapirgis a Papel (1964)
- Dawel (1964)
- Littik (1965)
- Samuel (1966)
- Dagiti Agtawid (1967)
- Ti Biddut (1968)
- Nympho (1971)

=== Sex education literature ===
- Lalake at Babae (1974) – Man and Woman
- Sex Education sa Modernong Lalaki at Babae (1986) – Sex Education for Modern Man and Woman
- Panalo Ka! (1990) – You Win!
- My Sexpert Opinion (1984)

== See also ==
- Ilokano literature
- GUMIL Filipinas
- Ilokano writers
- Literature of the Philippines
