= Bicol =

Bikol or Bicol usually refers to:

- Bicol Region, administrative region of the Philippines

Bikol or Bicol may also refer to:

== Languages and people ==
- Bikol languages, the languages spoken in the Bicol region in the Philippines
  - Albay Bikol language, a language of Bicol
  - Central Bikol language, a language of Bicol
  - Pandan Bikol language, a language of Bicol
  - Rinconada Bikol language, a language of Bicol
- Bicolano people, the ethnic group

== Political parties ==
- Ako Bicol, a political party in the Philippines

== Food ==
- Bicol express, a popular Filipino dish

== Hubs of transportation ==
- Bicol International Airport, an airport in Albay province
- Bicol Isarog Transport System, a Philippine bus company

== Water bodies ==
- Bicol River, the eighth largest river in the Philippines

== Newspaper ==
- Bicol Standard, a newspaper in Bicol Region

== Educational institutions ==
- Central Bicol State University of Agriculture, the regional center for higher learning in agriculture in the Bicol Region
- Bicol University, a regional state and research university in Bicol Region, the Philippines
- Polytechnic State University of Bicol, a state university in the Philippines

== Sports ==
- Bicol Volcanoes, a basketball team

== Park ==
- Bicol Natural Park, a protected area of the Philippines located in the Bicol Region
