= Hiligaynon people =

Visayan ethnic group

Hiligaynon / Ilonggo people
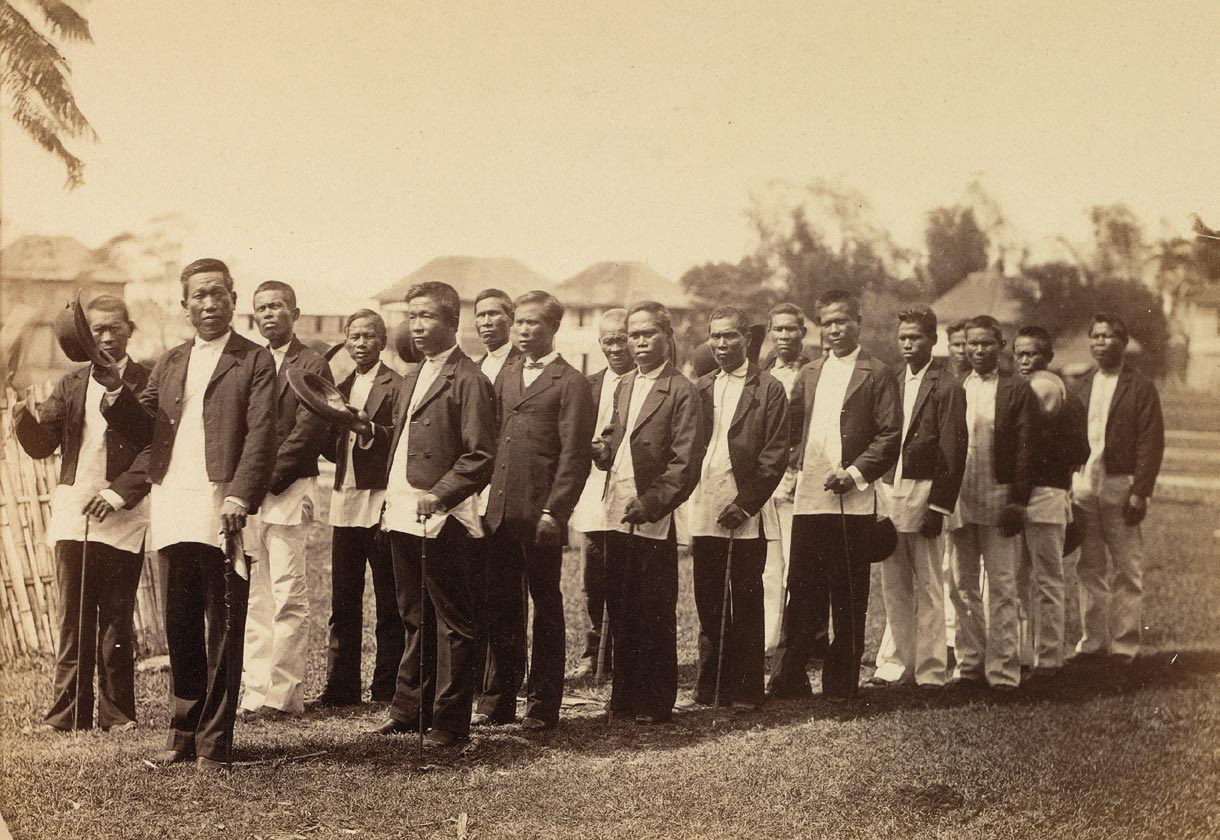
- Principalías of Leganes, Iloilo c. 1880.

Total population
- 8,608,191 (2020)

Regions with significant populations
- Philippines (Western Visayas, Negros Island Region, southern Mindoro, Romblon, Palawan, Masbate, Soccsksargen) Significant diaspora in: United States; Canada; Australia; United Kingdom; Ireland; New Zealand; Singapore United Arab Emirates

Languages
- Native; Hiligaynon; Also; Cebuano • Filipino • English

Religion
- Predominantly; Christianity (majority Roman Catholicism • minority Aglipayan and Protestantism)

Related ethnic groups
- Other Visayan peoples; (Boholano; Cebuano; Masbateño; Waray; Butuanon; Aklanon; Surigaonon; Capiznon; Cuyonon; Ratagnon; Karay-a; Romblomanon; Suludnon); Other Austronesian peoples

The Hiligaynon people (Hiligaynon: mga Hiligaynon), often referred to as Ilonggo people (Hiligaynon: mga Ilonggo) or Panayan people (Hiligaynon: mga Panayanon), are the second largest subgroup of the larger Visayan ethnic group, whose primary language is Hiligaynon, an Austronesian language of the Visayan branch native to Panay, Guimaras, and Negros. They originated in the province of Iloilo, on the island of Panay, in the region of Western Visayas. Over the years, inter-migrations and intra-migrations have contributed to the diaspora of the Hiligaynon to different parts of the Philippines. Today, the Hiligaynon, apart from the province of Iloilo, also form the majority in the provinces of Guimaras, Negros Occidental, Capiz, South Cotabato, Sultan Kudarat, and Cotabato Province. Hiligaynon is also spoken in some parts of Sarangani Province particularly in the Municipality of Malungon.

== Etymology of Hiligaynon, Ilonggo, and Panayan ==
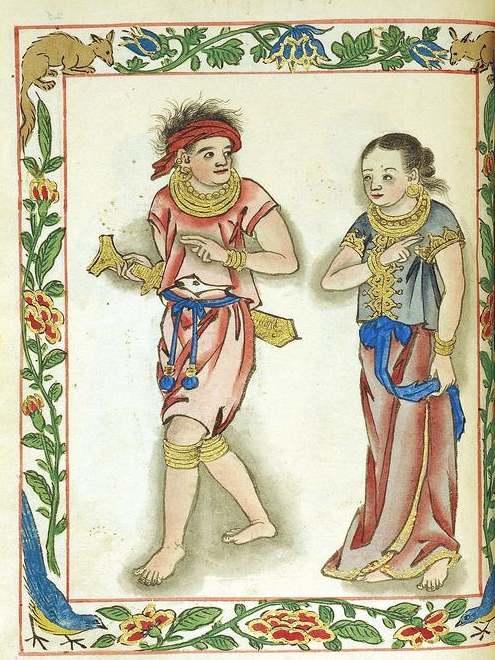
A Visayan royal nobility (or tumao) couple, depicted in the Boxer Codex (c. 1595).

The demonym "Hiligaynon" is from Spanish Hiligueinos (also spelled Yliguenes, Yligueynes, or Hiligueynos), which is derived from the older demonym "Iligan" or "Iliganon", meaning "people of the coast", from the root word ilig ("to go downstream"), referring to a river in Iloilo, Panay. During the early Spanish colonial period, the conquistador Miguel de Loarca also used the name "Yliguenes" for other coastal-dwelling Visayan peoples in Cebu, Bohol, and Western Negros.

The term "Ilonggo" is derived from "Ilong-ilong", the old name for Iloilo City, Panay. “Ilonggo” is considered to define a specific group of people whose ethnic origins are in the provinces of Iloilo, Guimaras, and Panay, while "Hiligaynon" defines the language and culture of the Ilonggo people. Thus, both terms are interchangeable in referring to the culture of the people or the people themselves.

The term "Panayan" is derived from "Panay," the name of the island, with the addition of the suffix "-an," which typically denotes a group of people associated with a place. It is sometimes used as an umbrella term that encompasses not only the Ilonggo people but also the Karay-a, Capiznon, and Aklanon peoples. The definition can be used interchangeably with "Ilonggo people" to refer to the broader ethnic group of people from Panay.

== History ==
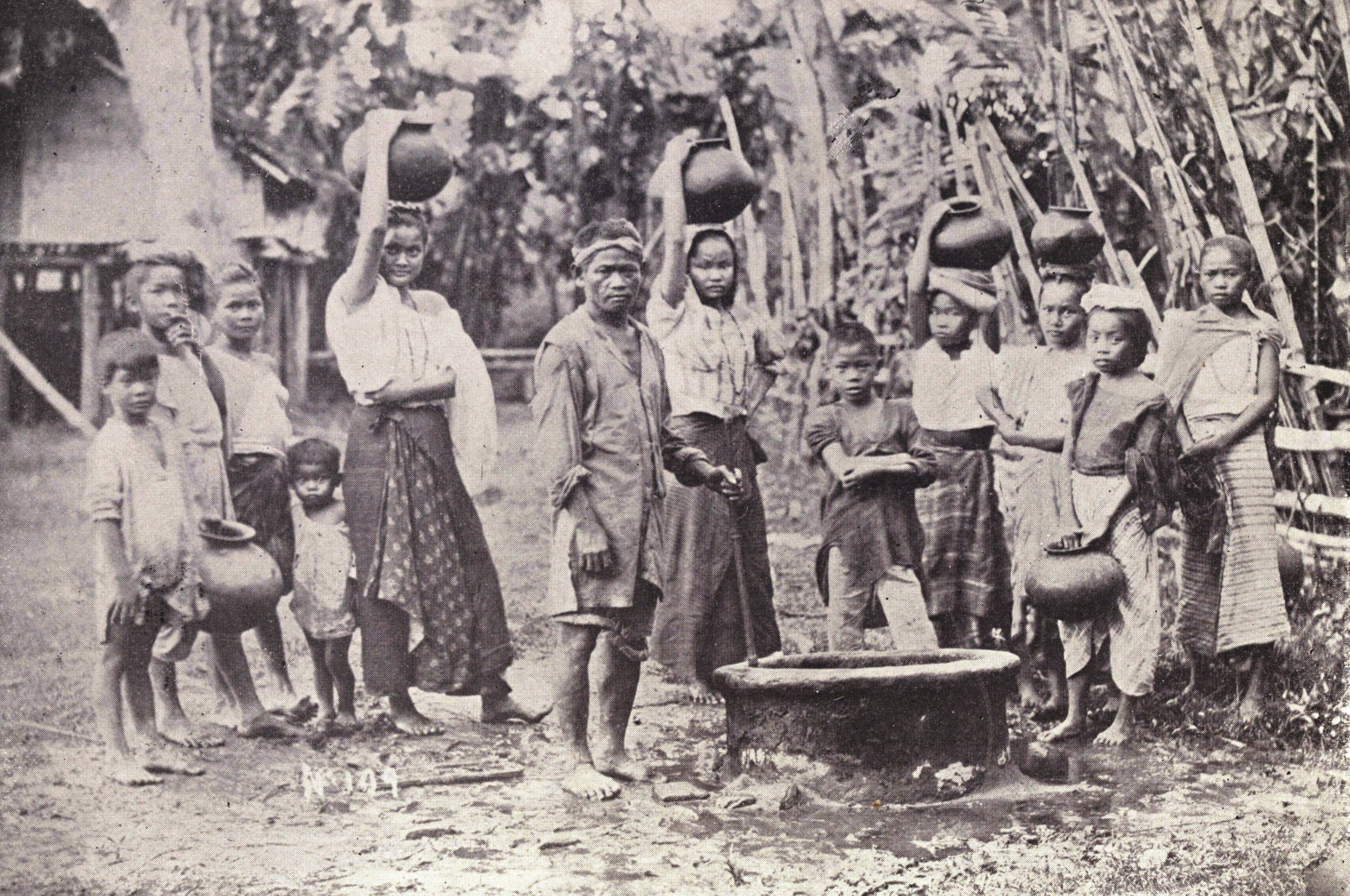
Water carriers in Iloilo, 1899

The original inhabitants of Western Visayas were the Negritos, particularly the Ati people in Panay. Malay-speaking peoples settled in the island in the 13th century, but some of the facts of this settlements are clouded by folk mythology among the Hiligaynon. What is known is that in the 13th century, ten datu (chieftains) arrived from Borneo, fleeing the collapse of a central Indonesian empire. The Ati agreed to allow the newcomers to settle, who had purchased the island from them, and the island was named Madya-as. Since then, political organization was introduced to Panay under the Malay newcomers. By the arrival of the Spanish in 1569, the inhabitants of Panay were well-organized, yet became part of Spanish colonial rule.

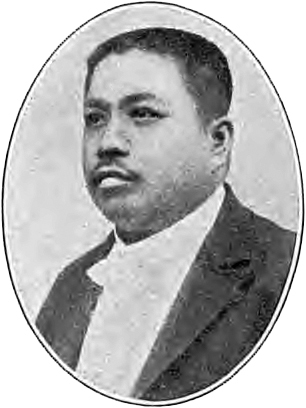
Melecio Severino of Silay, The first Governor of Negros Occidental

The 19th century was marked by the migration of the Hiligaynon from Panay to Negros. (Note: According to Funtecha, "This one-sided movement of the people between the two islands is referred to by a writer, Francisco Varona (1938) as “La imigracion Ilonggo.") Their migration was due to the growth of sugarcane production in the later 19th century. This was also caused by the wane of the textile industry, increasing the labor pool for sugarcane in Panay through the industry's losses. Spanish colonials actively sponsored the migration, especially by prominent peninsulares and mestizos. It was such that between 1822 and 1876, the population in Negros increased so that it matched the population of Panay (756,000) from the 1822 count of 49,369. Many revolutionaries in the late 19th century who sought independence from Spain were Hiligaynon. Some of them were part of the educated elite who sought for reforms, such as Graciano López Jaena, who led the reformist newspaper La Solidaridad. Others were military leaders such as Martin Delgado, who became known to the Hiligaynon as "the greatest Visayan general of the Philippine Revolution."

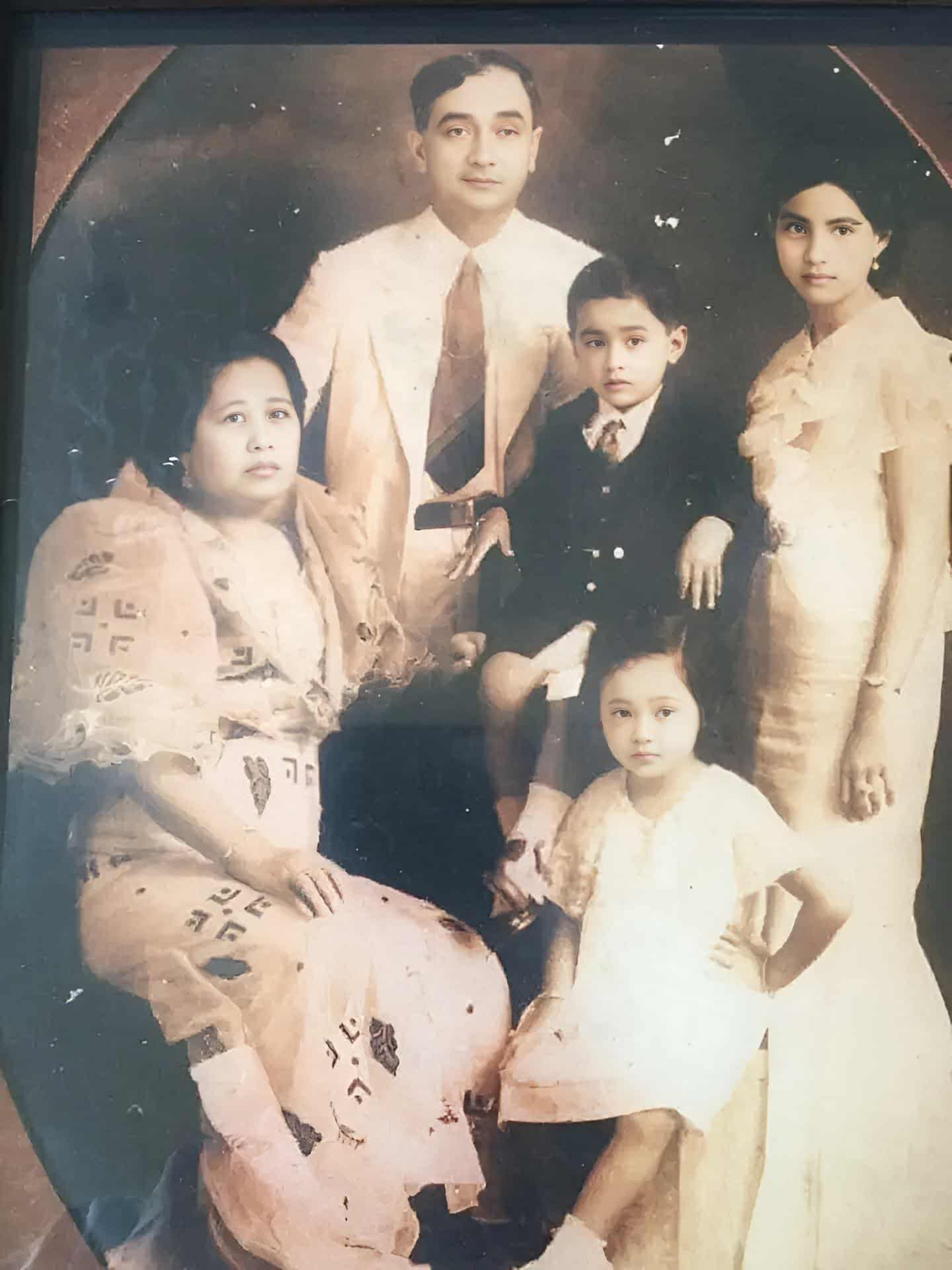
Montinola family of Jaro, Iloilo City

A later migration of Hiligaynon occurred in the 20th century to Mindanao in the 1940s under Manuel Roxas who was also Hiligaynon. Thousands migrated throughout the 1940s and 1950s as part of a resettlement movement sponsored by the government as a way of skirting land reform. This came at the expense of the local Maguindanaon population, who were not helped by the government, and which contributed to later tensions between the mostly Christian Hiligaynon and the Muslim Maguindanaon.

== Culture ==
Part of the dominant culture in the Philippines known as the Lowland Christians. Many cultural festivals are organized, serving a purpose of cultural preservation and celebration against the "homogenizing of the Philippine culture.", while also serving well for local and national tourism. The Dinagyang festival is celebrated every fourth Sunday of January in Iloilo City. The festival name is derived from the word dagyang meaning "merry-making". Modeled after Ati-atihan in Kalibo, Aklan, Dinagyang venerates the Santo Niño, and specifically commemorates the purchase of Panay Island from the Indigenous Ati by 10 fleeing Bornean datus (chiefs). Arts festivals, such as the Ilonggo Arts Festival, have used contemporary media such as film and radio, in addition to public performances, and they have also sponsored engagement in dialogue over cultural preservation. (Note: "Performers recited traditional poems on local radio, ritual dances were performed to a backdrop of more than one hundred modern paintings and installations, and the event's key conference explored the impact of globalisation and information technology on indigenous cultures.") The Iloilo Paraw Regatta, held each year in February, also has goals for cultural preservation: the ships used in the regatta, the paraw, are traditional sailboats that have long been used by the Hiligaynon. Competitors in the Paraw Regatta are local fishermen, who compete in a week-long competition at sea, accompanied by a festival on land.

A prominent Hiligaynon profile exists in national and regional sports, notably in football. The popular national football team players Phil and James Younghusband have a mother who is Ilonggo. Football is very popular in Western Visayas, and the Iloilo town of Barotac Nuevo has been known to contribute many football players to the national team. Also of note are Hiligaynon athletes on the national track team.

Hiligaynon settlers in Mindanao may have also assimilated Lumad and Moro traditions to varying degrees, and vice versa (e.g., the use of the Hiligaynon-language Toto as a nickname by non-Hiligaynons).

== Demographics ==
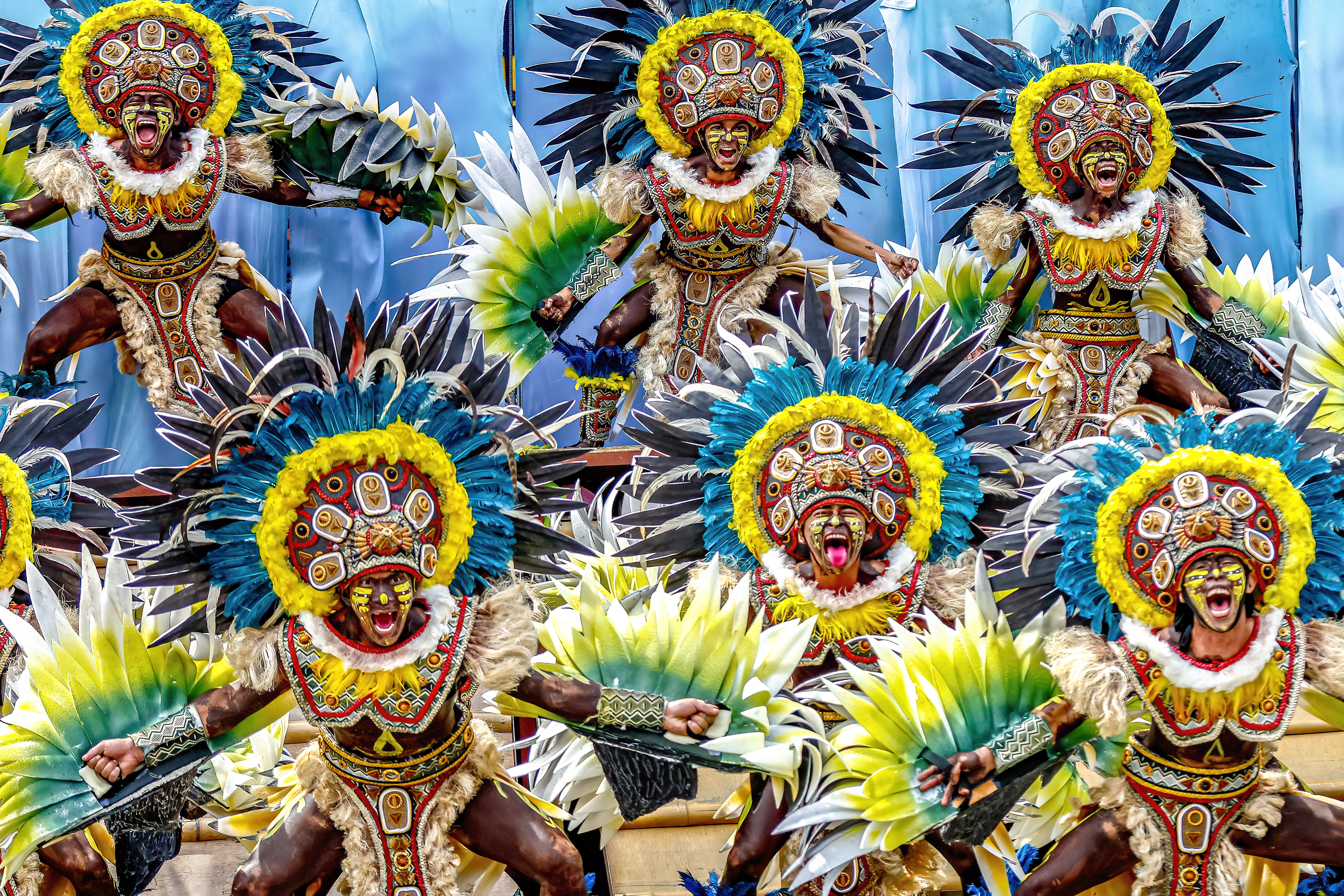
Dinagyang Tribe Warriors during the 2026 Tribe Dance Competition.

According to a 2010 census, 8.44% of the national population is Hiligaynon/Ilonggo, compared to 24.44% Tagalog (the plurality group). This makes the Hiligaynon the fourth most populous ethnic group in the nation behind the Tagalog (24.44%), the Cebuano (9.91%), the Ilocano (8.77%), Two provinces have populations above one million since a 1990 census: Iloilo (1,608,083) and Negros Occidental (1,821,206), comprising 97.6% and 80.7%, respectively, with urban centers taken into account. (Note: The percentages here were based on a fraction of the population of Hiligaynon in Iloilo and Negros Occidental and the total population in both respective provinces (with the cities of Iloilo and Bacolod taken into account).)

Provinces where the Hiligaynon are the majority ethnic group are shown in purple (but are not to be confused with the Kamayo in Eastern Mindanao).

Province	Hiligaynon Population	Total Population	Percentage of Hiligaynon (%) (Note: As in the previous note on the percentages of Hiligaynon in Iloilo and Negros Occidental, these were based on the population of Hiligaynon in each province and the total population in each respective province, with metropolitan areas taken into account.)
Abra	96	184,743	0.1
Agusan del Norte	3,309	642,196	0.2
Agusan del Sur	26,960	656,418	6.4
Aklan	55,182	574,823	9.6
Albay	242	1,233,432	0
Antique	70,423	582,012	12.1
Apayao	3	121,636	0
Aurora	188	201,233	0.1
Basilan	1,748	391,179	0.7
Bataan	2,959	687,482	0.7
Batanes	2	16,604	0
Batangas	2,144	2,377,395	0.1
Benguet	460	722,620	0.1
Biliran	?	161,760	?
Bohol	107	1,255,128	0
Bukidnon	181,148	1,415,226	12.8
Bulacan	4,635	3,124,433	0.3
Cagayan	261	1,124,773	0
Camarines Norte	137	542,915	0
Camarines Sur	909	1,822,371	0.1
Camiguin	20	83,807	0
Capiz	575,369	719,685	79.9
Catanduanes	59	246,300	0
Cavite	9,604	3,090,691	0.8
Cebu	6,669	4,167,320	0.3
Cotabato	804,329	1,379,747	68.8
Davao del Norte	53,012	945,764	9
Davao de Oro	4	687,195	0
Davao del Sur	30,059	2,024,206	2
Davao Occidental	30	293,780	0
Davao Oriental	3,410	517,618	0.9
Dinagat Islands	10	126,803	0
Eastern Samar	148	428,877	0
Guimaras	171,041	174,943	98.9
Ifugao	10	191,078	0
Ilocos Norte	159	568,017	0
Ilocos Sur	146	658,587	0
Iloilo	1,968,083	2,230,195	99.9
Isabela	552	1,489,645	0.1
Kalinga	10	201,603	0
La Union	193	741,906	0
Laguna	3,809	2,669,847	0.3
Lanao del Norte	4,214	930,738	0.7
Lanao del Sur	11,057	933,260	1.8
Leyte	2,951	1,789,158	0.2
Maguindanao	41,988	944,138	5.5
Marinduque	53	227,828	0
Masbate	298,951	892,393	33.7
Misamis Occidental	397	567,642	0.1
Misamis Oriental	3,611	1,415,944	0.4
Mountain Province	?	154,187	?
Negros Occidental	1,821,206	3,059,136	98.7
Negros Oriental	329,263	1,354,995	23.4
Northern Samar	347	589,013	0.1
Nueva Ecija	373	1,955,373	0.2
Nueva Vizcaya	312	421,355	0.1
Occidental Mindoro	18,248	452,971	6.5
Oriental Mindoro	10,373	785,602	1.9
Palawan	332,315	1,104,585	19.6
Pampanga	2,826	2,609,744	0.2
Pangasinan	839	2,956,726	0
Quezon	1,262	1,987,030	0.1
Quirino	101	176,786	0.1
Rizal	14,870	2,484,840	1.5
Romblon	1,474	283,390	0.6
Samar	293	733,377	0.1
Sarangani	1	498,904	0
Siquijor	76	91,066	0.1
Sorsogon	295	740,743	0.1
South Cotabato	914,044	1,365,286	72.3
Southern Leyte	179	399,137	0.1
Sultan Kudarat	536,298	747,087	73.4
Sulu	11	718,290	0
Surigao del Norte	1,064	442,588	0.3
Surigao del Sur	4,424	561,219	1
Tarlac	614	1,273,240	0.1
Tawi-Tawi	51	366,550	0
Zambales	3,276	755,621	0.6
Zamboanga del Norte	3,501	957,997	0.5
Zamboanga del Sur	7,409	1,766,814	0.7
Zamboanga Sibugay	3,702	584,685	2
Metro Manila	199,290	11,855,975	2.5

=== Overseas ===
Like many other Filipino ethnic groups such as the Ilocano, there are organized associations of migrant Hiligaynon that aim to celebrate their culture through their own communities. Several publicly known organizations are concentrated in California and Hawaii, among other locations in the United States. (Note: Examples of these organizations include the Ilonggo Circle of San Francisco and the Ilonggo Association of Southern California, as well as the Kahirup Ilonggo of Hawaii.)

=== Religion ===
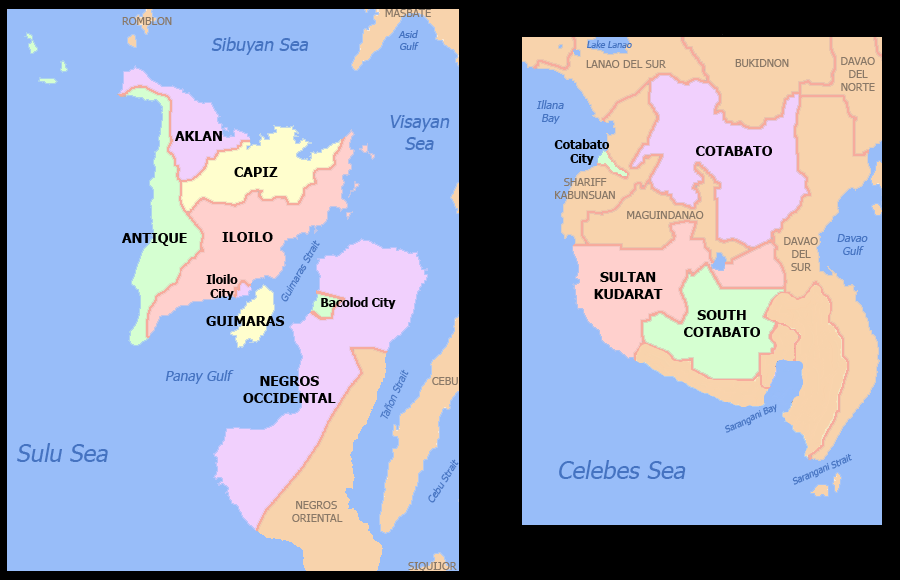
Geographically, Hiligaynon is mostly spoken in Panay, Guimaras, Negros, and southern parts of Mindanao.

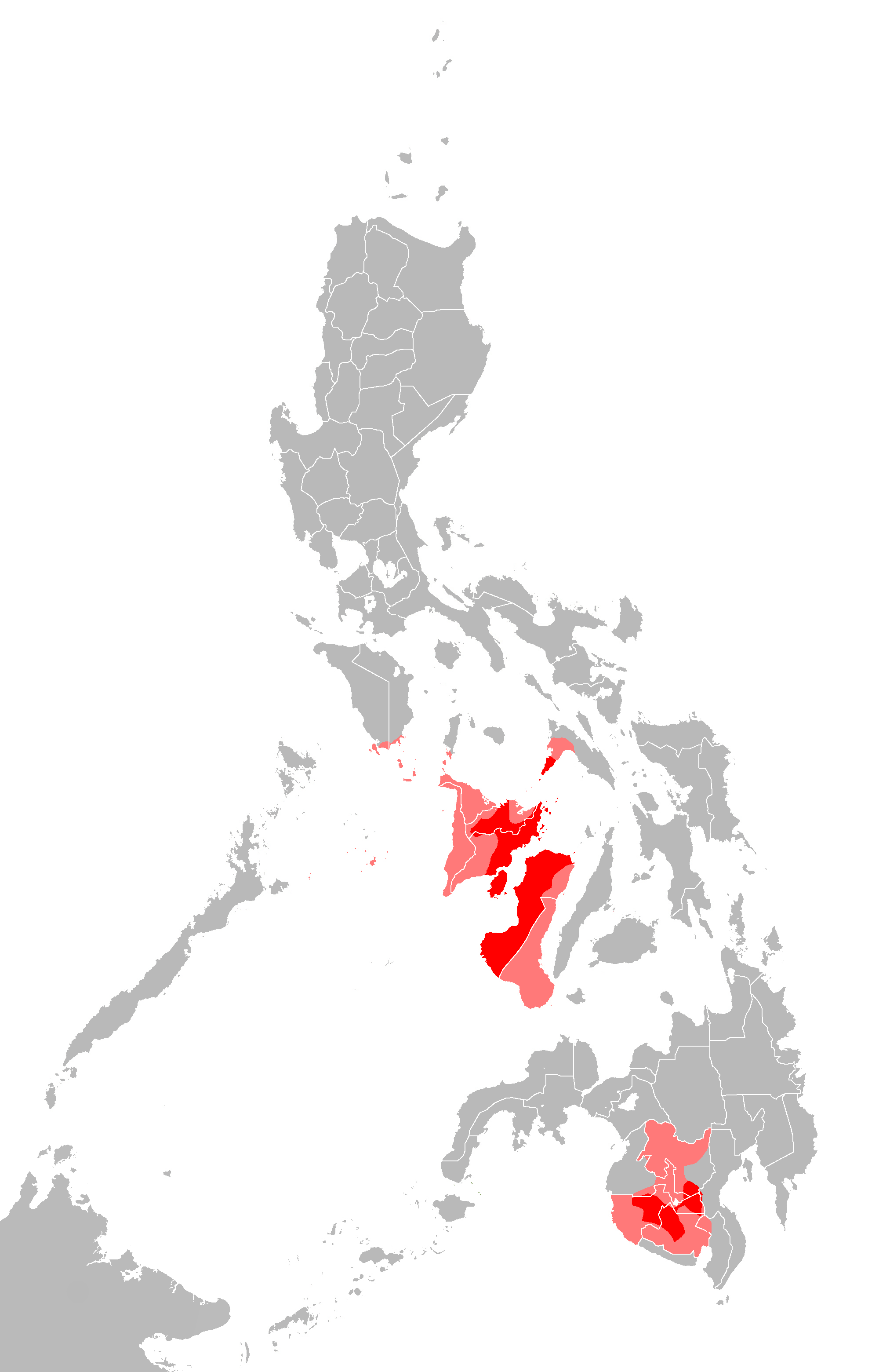
Areas where Hiligaynon is spoken

Most Hiligaynons are Christians, with a majority of these Christians being Roman Catholics. There are also smaller populations of Hiligaynons who are Aglipayan, Protestants, and Muslims. The Indigenous Hiligaynon faiths were largely eliminated during the Spanish era and survived as Folk Catholicism.

=== Language ===
The Hiligaynon language is part of the Visaya (Bisaya) family of languages in the central islands of the Philippines, and is particular to the Hiligaynon people. Ultimately, it is a Malayo-Polynesian language like many other languages spoken by Filipino ethnic groups, as well as languages in neighboring states such as Indonesia and Malaysia. This language is marked by its song-like intonation in speech, while also having a more prevalent "l" sound than "r" sound. Its related language on Panay, Kinaray-a, is similar to Hiligaynon but older. Throughout the nation, the Hiligaynon speak Tagalog and English as second languages, especially outside of Western Visayas. Many Hiligaynon residents in Mindanao and their descendants can speak and understand Cebuano with Ilonggo accent in addition to their own native language since these both languages are related to Visayan languages and many vocabularies of both are very mutually intelligible to each other, both due to the huge influx of Cebuano-speaking individuals from Cebu, Bohol, Leyte, Siquijor and other Cebuano-speaking majority areas in Mindanao residing in Soccsksargen, and Hiligaynons residing in Cebuano-speaking areas in the island especially in cities. Some even speak Ilocano (a native language of the Luzon ethnic group of the same name sharing residency with Hiligaynons in Soccsksargen area) as well as the island's Indigenous languages because of intermingling and coexistence between the Indigenous and migrant ethnicities in the area, resulting from southward migration from Luzon and Visayas since the 20th century since Mindanao, particularly in Soccsksargen, is a melting pot of cultures. Likewise, Hiligaynons in eastern Negros Occidental can also speak and understand Cebuano with Ilonggo accent (slightly different from Hiligaynons in Mindanao) due to its geographical contact with the Cebuano-speaking Negros Oriental. A mixture of Cebuano and Hiligaynon is spoken in Sagay and neighboring cities and municipalities facing both Iloilo and Cebu. There has also been overlap between the Visayan languages in terms of vocabulary and the knowledge of the languages by the Hiligaynon. For example, some towns in Capiz use Aklanon words in their competency of Hiligaynon, while Kinaray-a and Hiligaynon are spoken by the residents of Guimaras, as well as residents in some parts of southern Iloilo. According to Spanish era tribute-censuses, Spanish-Filipinos compose 1% of the Ilongo/Hiligaynon people's population.

== Economy ==
The local economy of the Hiligaynon is mostly based on agriculture and fishing, as well as the production of woven cloths and crafts. A statue that celebrates the contributions of the Ilonggo in agriculture and fishing was erected in Iloilo City. "Ang Linay Sang Iloilo" (The Lady of Iloilo) makes references to rice growing, sugarcane, and fishing, standing to emphasize the economic importance of Iloilo and the importance of the Ilonggo in general.

=== Agriculture ===
Rice and sugarcane are significant agricultural products that are produced in great volume. Cultivation practices for rice and sugarcane were well established among the early Hiligaynon before the arrival of the Spanish, who were also able to produce wine from the juice of these crops. The Spanish became the catalysts for large-scale agricultural production, dividing Panay into encomienda and enlisting the natives of Panay, including the Hiligaynon, into labor for the haciendas.

By the 19th century, the sugarcane industry became more expansive and modernized due to the confluence of increased port access and new technology and financial resources. A Spanish royal decree in 1855 ordered that the port be opened, with the expectation of increasing economic growth in areas beyond Manila. Given the safe location of the port and a long-standing history of trade, Iloilo was an ideal international port, thus becoming integrated into the international trade of the 19th century. The British vice-consul in Iloilo, Nicholas Loney, was instrumental in introducing technological and financial resources to the existing sugar elites. Better sugarcane seeds were introduced from Sumatra, and Loney undertook the purchasing of centrifugal iron mills, as well as the provision of loans to planters. These, accompanied by the demand for sugar, helped to encourage the movement of the sugarcane planters to Negros, expanding the hacienda system to there. Many of the workers (many native to Panay) who were part of the hacienda system, the "dumaan", became the underclass beneath the "sugar barons" of the haciendas, with a middle class existing between who maintained urban stores and banks. This class structure was to persist into the Commonwealth era and as the sugar industry shifted its focus from Panay to Negros following a labor strike in 1930–1931.

The sugar industry in the 1970s through the 1980s experienced turmoil as financing decline and harvests went unpaid, leading the sugar elites to diversify their crop.

Today, tenant farming continues to be the norm in organizing labor for rice in Iloilo, a regional rice producer. As for sugar production, workers are paid minimum wage. Smaller-scale agriculture still exists along coastal plains and inland valleys, with crops such as corn and tobacco. The slash-and-burn system known as kaingin was and continues to be used by farmers in the mountainous interior of central Panay, using bolo knives to cut trees and wooden dibbers to plant seeds. Hunting has also supplemented the farmers' livelihood but has decreased with the decline of the forests since the 1970s.

=== Fishing ===
Fishing has been pursued since before the arrival of the Spanish and has contributed to the native Hiligaynon cuisine and diet.

Coastal towns in Iloilo have a strong fishing tradition, with sources of fish present in the Guimaras Strait. Inland fishing, especially of prawn, has taken root, especially as pursued by owners of haciendas looking to diversify their sources of income. This practice is pursued to a lesser extent by residents of the mountains, who use traditional nets and traps and poisonous plant materials in their methods.

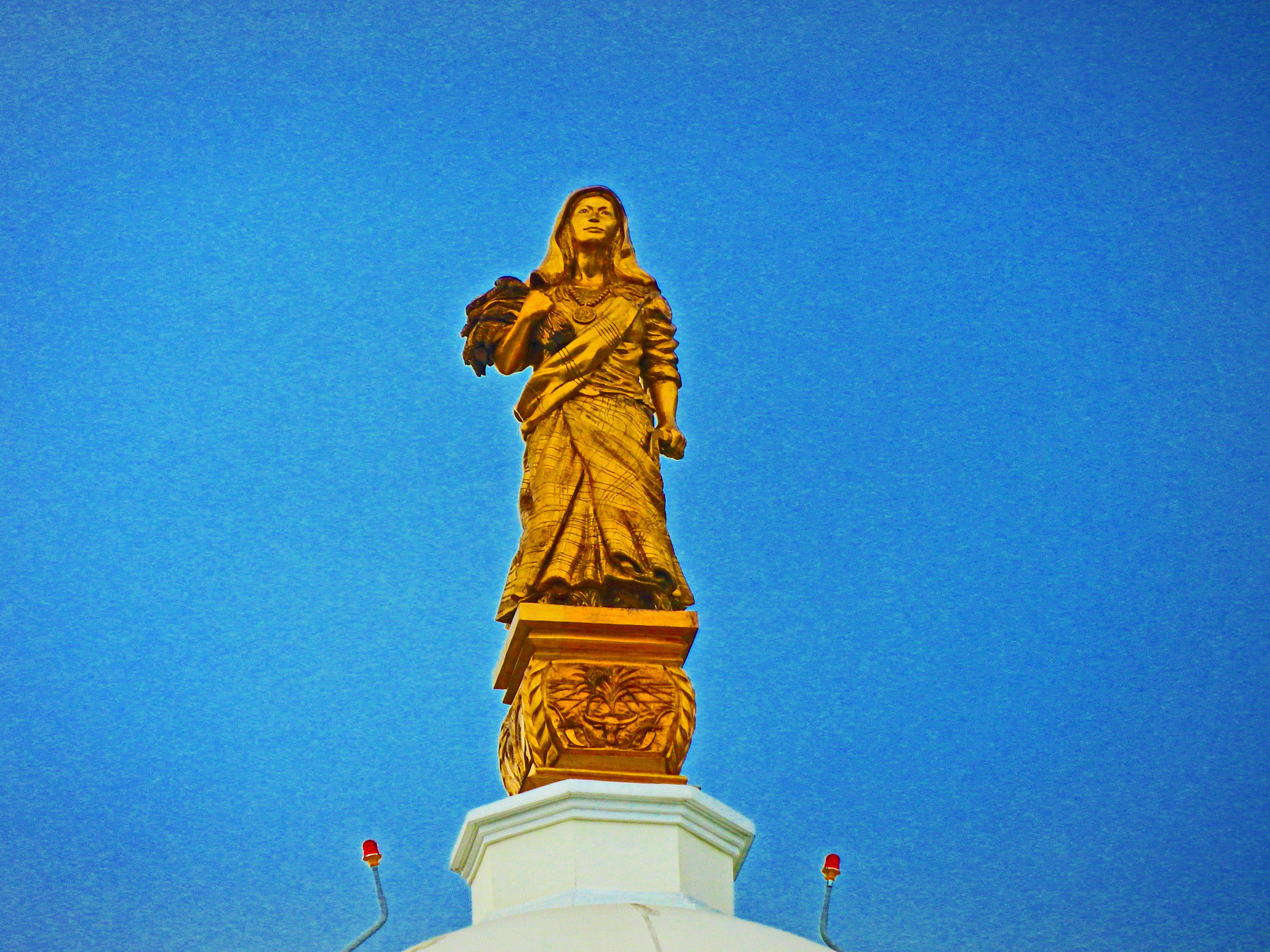
"Ang Lin-ay Sang Iloilo" is intended to symbolize the importance of the economic traditions of the Ilonggo

=== Textiles ===
In Iloilo, weaving based on local fibers is a source of income but to a lesser extent. Hand-loom weaving practices began historically among the Hiligaynon after trade with the Chinese introduced weaving materials.

By the 1850s, weaving became a substantial export for Iloilo, known then as the "textile capital of the Philippines" for its production of piña (pineapple fibers), silk, jusi (combined weaving of piña and silk), and sinamay (combined weaving of abacá and cotton). The prominence of Ilonggo fabrics on the international scale was propelled by the opening of the port of Iloilo. However, weaving declined by the end of the century due to the popularity of growing sugarcane and the availability of cheap British cotton cloth produced in factories. Today, local weavers have found a niche market in specialty fabrics such as hablon, an expensive cloth woven out of jusi and piña fibers. The Department of Trade and Industry has helped the weaving industry in Iloilo through adaptive local skills training and other investments.

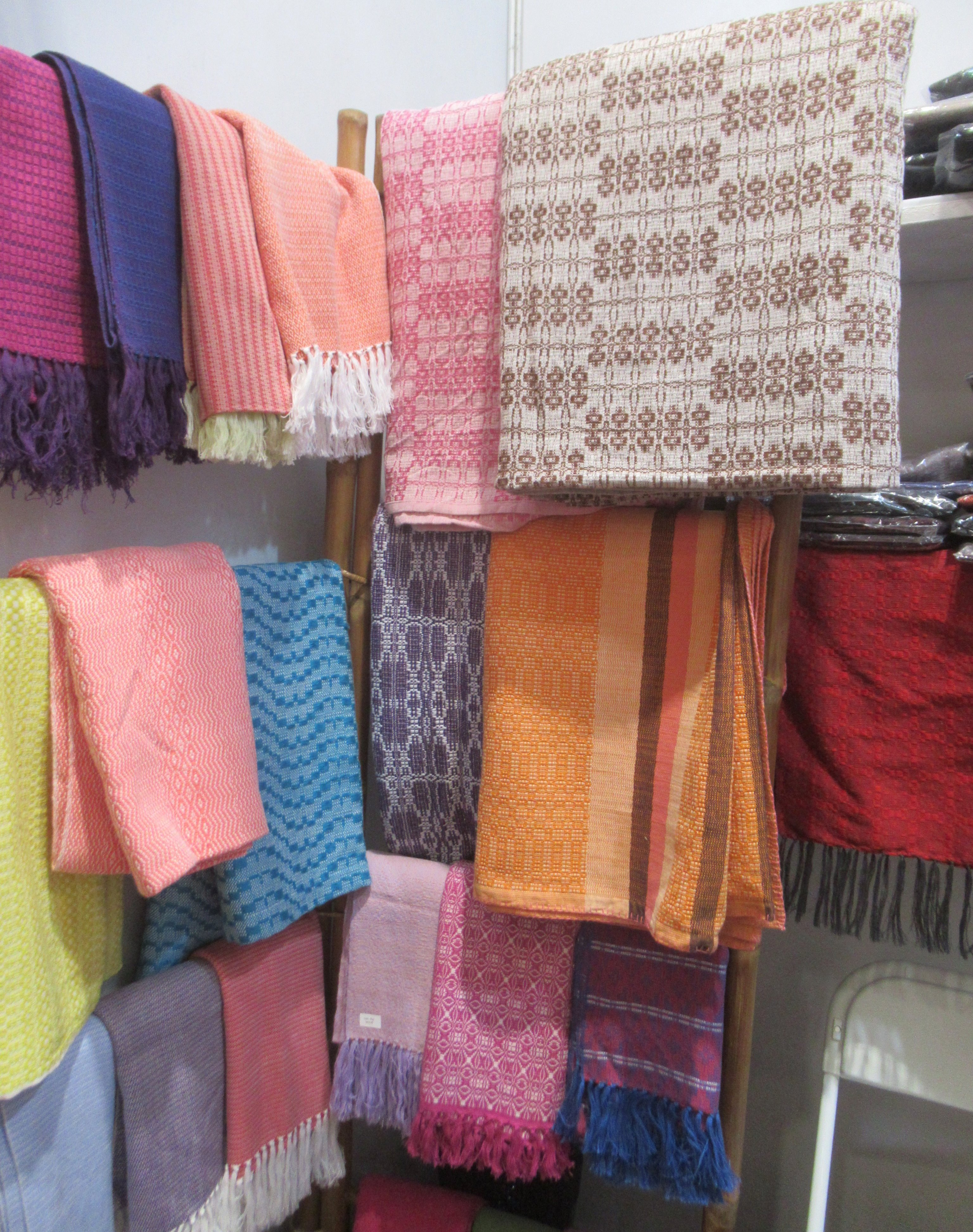
Iloilo & Kabankalan hablon

The hablon weaving industry has traditionally been dominated by skilled women working in weaving cooperatives, notably in the town of Miagao in Iloilo. Knowledge of weaving is passed down from mother to daughter. The daughters are expected to help their families in becoming involved with the trade as they get older. They produce hablon at a net profit of 35%, being paid at an average of 45 pesos per meter. Their hablon is used in barongs — a traditional men's formalwear — decorative linens for the home, and other accessories sold locally and internationally. The iconic Hablon textiles of the Kabankalan indigenous peoples's products include shawl, scarf, bandano tobao (headscarf), t-shirts, table runner, place mat and tela. The Negros 9 Kabankalan Weaving Community has new members, the Baraclayan and Sibucao weavers in Miagao and Iloilo. Cebu Pacific introduced its QR Flight codes pattered after traditional weaving of hues of brightness and plaid designs of Iloilo's Hablon to promote local tourism.

=== New products ===
With the spread of the Hiligaynon and their culture throughout the country, many business have catered to exporting aspects of the Hiligaynon culture in marketable products, appealing to urban tastes and members of the culture. These have included food, crafts, fashionable apparel, and art pieces, especially those that exhibit the cultures particular to Iloilo City and Bacolod.

== Food ==
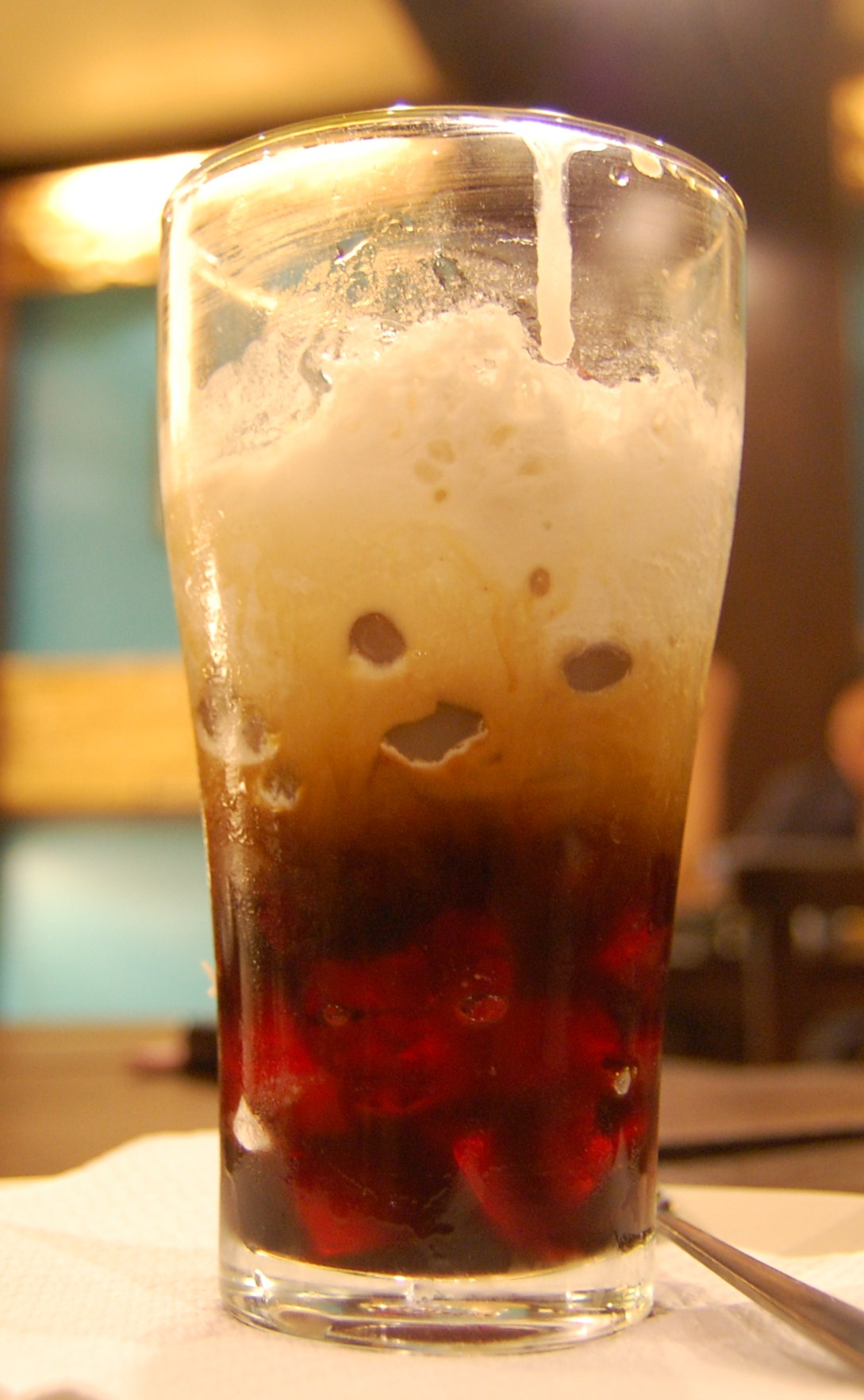
Hiligaynon style Guinomis (sago in coconut syrup with toasted rice)

Common meals have fish and other seafood as a main component. They are often cooked with local green produce and other spices. Rice is also served as part of the meal, as in the rest of the country. Several dishes of the Hiligaynon are well known to many Filipinos, and contribute to the local food culture of Iloilo City. La Paz Batchoy is one such dish, composed of pork innards, liver, and heart in a broth with noodles and trimmings such as chicharon and garlic. Pancit Molo is also a popular dish, a wonton soup with dumplings filled with pork, chicken, and shrimp, as well as trimmings of green onions and garlic. Particular to Western Visayas is Ibus, a finger food of glutinous rice wrapped in coconut leaves in the shape of a roll. Kadyos, baboy, kag lanka (KBL), Laswa, and Kansi are some of the other soup dishes originating from the Hiligaynon people.

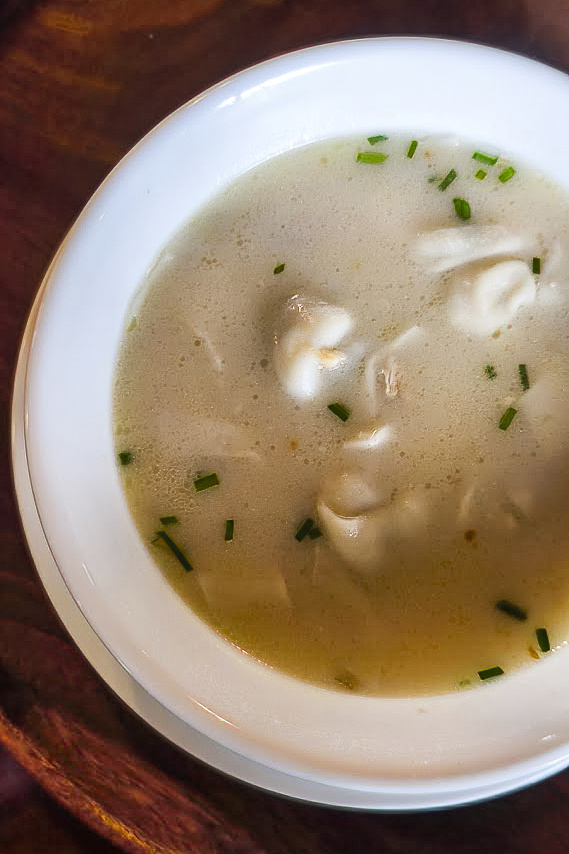
Pancit Molo served at the Camiña Balay nga Bato.

== Notable Hiligaynons ==
- Teresa Magbanua - a revolutionary and a national heroine who faught aginst the Spaniards, Americans, and the Japanese. She was dubbed as "Visayan Joan de Arc".
- Alvin Elchico – a Filipino journalist and field reporter

== See also ==
- Demographics of the Philippines
- Ethnic groups in the Philippines
- Iloilo
- Hiligaynon language
- Hiligaynon (magazine)
- Suludnon
- Lowland Christian Filipinos
- Visayans
  - Aklanon people
  - Boholano people
  - Capiznon people
  - Cebuano people
  - Cuyunon people
  - Eskaya people
  - Karay-a people
  - Masbateño people
  - Porohanon people
  - Romblomanon people
  - Suludnon
  - Waray people
- Western Visayas
