= Daily Tribune (Philippines) =

English-language daily newspaper in the Philippines

- Without Fear, Without Favor
- Front page print edition on June 30, 2026
- Type: Daily newspaper
- Format: Broadsheet
- Owner(s): Concept and Information Group, Inc.
- Founder: Ninez Cacho-Olivares
- Publisher: Concept and Information Group, Inc.
- President: Wilfredo "Willie" B. Fernandez
- Editor: Luisito "Chito" Lozada (executive editor)
- Managing editor: Dinah Sabal-Ventura
- Founded: February 1, 2000; 26 years ago
- Language: English
- Headquarters: 3450 Concept Building, Florida Street, Makati, Metro Manila, Philippines
- Website: tribune.net.ph

Daily Tribune (DT) is an English-language daily broadsheet newspaper and online news publication in the Philippines. Founded on February 1, 2000 by journalist Ninez Cacho-Olivares, it is based in Makati. In June 2018, Cacho-Olivares sold the publication to Concept and Information Group Inc., which publishes the newspaper to this day.

The newspaper became involved in a major Philippine press-freedom case in 2006 after police raided its offices during a state of national emergency declared by President Gloria Macapagal Arroyo. In David v. Macapagal-Arroyo, the Supreme Court of the Philippines ruled that the warrantless search of the newspaper's offices and seizure of materials intended for publication were unconstitutional.

== History ==
=== Founding and early years ===
Daily Tribune was founded on February 1, 2000 by journalist Ninez Cacho-Olivares. Before founding the newspaper, Cacho-Olivares had served as publisher and editor in chief of the now-defunct Philippine Post and had written for the Philippine Daily Inquirer, Business Day (later renamed BusinessWorld), and Bulletin Today.

Cacho-Olivares served as the newspaper's publisher and editor in chief. A 2008 academic survey of English-language media in the Philippines, citing the 4A's Media Factbook, listed Daily Tribune's total circulation at 130,000 in 2004.

Before its sale in 2018, the newspaper was published by Tribune Publishing Company Inc. Media Ownership Monitor reported in 2016, citing corporate filings with the Securities and Exchange Commission, that the Olivares family directly held 50 percent of Tribune Publishing, while Olica Development Corp. held the remaining 50 percent. Cacho-Olivares personally held a 25 percent stake and served as chairman and president of the company.

=== 2006 state of national emergency ===
President Gloria Macapagal Arroyo issued Proclamation No. 1017 on February 24, 2006, declaring a state of national emergency amid what the government described as a plot to overthrow the administration.

Early on February 25, personnel of the Philippine National Police Criminal Investigation and Detection Group entered the Daily Tribune offices in Manila. The Supreme Court's account states that police seized news stories, documents, photographs and page mock-ups and later stationed personnel inside and outside the newspaper's premises. The Committee to Protect Journalists (CPJ) reported that the raid was carried out without a warrant, that police seized unpublished story drafts and other documents and that the newspaper's printing presses were padlocked overnight. Daily Tribune continued publishing.

The state of national emergency ended on March 3, 2006. Cacho-Olivares and Tribune Publishing Company challenged the government's actions before the Supreme Court as part of the consolidated case David v. Macapagal-Arroyo. On May 3, the court upheld the president's authority to declare the state of emergency but ruled that several acts carried out during it were unconstitutional, including the warrantless search of the Daily Tribune offices and seizure of materials intended for publication.

Authorities also filed inciting-to-sedition charges against Cacho-Olivares and Daily Tribune columnists Ike Seneres and Herman Tiu-Laurel. CPJ criticized the charges and called on the government to drop them.

=== Acquisition and later development ===
In June 2018, Cacho-Olivares sold Daily Tribune to Concept and Information Group Inc., which became the newspaper's publisher.

On September 23, 2018, Daily Tribune became one of more than 30 founding media organizations of the Sustainable Development Goals Media Compact, an initiative intended to increase public awareness and discussion of the Sustainable Development Goals. The United Nations continues to list Daily Tribune among the compact's members.

Cacho-Olivares died on January 3, 2020 at the age of 78.

In January 2021, Daily Tribune and the Polytechnic University of the Philippines signed a multimedia partnership agreement providing for seminars, panel discussions, lecture series, and practical training programs for students and faculty members.

=== Legal cases ===
In August 2003, Cacho-Olivares was arrested on two libel charges filed by lawyer Arthur Villaraza following a series of Daily Tribune reports concerning Villaraza and the Ninoy Aquino International Airport (NAIA) Terminal III project. She posted bail after her arrest.

On June 5, 2008, the Makati Regional Trial Court found Cacho-Olivares guilty of libel over a 2003 article concerning the law firm then known as Carpio Villaraza Cruz and the NAIA Terminal III controversy. She was sentenced to imprisonment of six months to two years and ordered to pay ₱5 million in damages and ₱33,732.25 in civil damages. Cacho-Olivares posted bail, and her lawyer said the conviction would be appealed.

In January 2024, Philippine Consul General in Milan Elmer Cato filed 17 counts of cyberlibel against Daily Tribune personnel over reports and commentary concerning an immigration consultancy firm and Filipinos seeking employment in Italy. The Angeles City Prosecutor's Office dismissed the complaints in July 2024, citing lack of jurisdiction and probable cause.

== Awards and recognition ==
In 2017, Daily Tribune was named Newspaper of the Year at the Rotary Club of Manila Journalism Awards. Daily Tribune reporter Charlie Manalo was also named Newspaper Male Reporter of the Year.

In 2021, Daily Tribune was among the print-media organizations presented with the Rotary Club of Manila's Pro Patria Journalism Award. That year's awards recognized media organizations that continued providing news and information during the COVID-19 pandemic.

The Rotary Club of Manila named Daily Tribune Newspaper of the Year again in 2023.

In 2025, the Rotary Club of Manila conferred its Pro Patria Journalism Award on Daily Tribune and inducted the newspaper into its Hall of Fame for Journalism.

== See also ==
- Media of the Philippines
- List of newspapers in the Philippines
- List of newspapers published in Metro Manila
