= Ninez Cacho-Olivares =

Filipino journalist (1941–2020)

Ninez Cacho-Olivares (July 19, 1941 – January 3, 2020) was a Filipino journalist, having worked in the industry for over 20 years as a feature writer and political columnist in various Manila broadsheets such as the Bulletin Today, Philippine Daily Inquirer, Business Day, and Business World. She was publisher and editor-in-chief for the Philippine Post prior to becoming Daily Tribune's publisher and editor-in-chief.

She was known to be a staunch defender of former Philippine President Joseph Ejército Estrada.

She died on January 3, 2020, at the age of 78.
