= Juan S.P. Hidalgo Jr. =

Juan S.P. Hidalgo Jr. (July 12, 1936, in Intramuros, Manila, Philippines, – October 23, 2020, in Tomana, Rosales, Pangasinan), is an Ilokano fictionist (short story, novel), poet, editor, translator, and painter. He was former managing editor of Bannawag, a weekly Ilokano magazine. During his 37-year stint (1961–1998) as senior literary editor at Bannawag, he guided, encouraged and trained young and old Ilokano writers to produce quality Iloko literary works. He was among the recipients of the first ever Philippine-International Theater Institute-National Commission for Culture and the Arts Award for Culture-Friendly Media Institutions.

Hidalgo was responsible for the founding of GUMIL Filipinas (Gunglo dagiti Mannurat nga Ilokano iti Filipinas). The top national organization of Iloko writers, GUMIL now boasts of chapters in Guam, Greece, California, and Hawaii.

Considered by his peers as a "prodigy in Ilokano literature," Hidalgo published in 1969 the now classic Iloko anthology, "Bituen ti Rosales ken Dadduma Pay a Sarita" ("Star of Rosales and Other Stories"), a collection of 20 selected short stories. This book became, as Iloko literary critics and scholars acknowledge, the "official textbook of contemporary Iloko writers" because of its influence on the serious Iloko writer.

As editor and translator, he published other anthologies of selected Iloko short stories; he translated a number of novels and short stories written in German or Japanese into Iloko. Even as he toiled as literary editor at Bannawag and saw to it that the quality of the literary output improved, he was able to publish in the magazine some 7 novels, 3 novellas, 4 biographies about the Virgin Mary, and numerous poems, short stories and essays.

He started painting in 1979 and he was a founding member of the U.P. Campus Sunday Group, an association of painters at the University of the Philippines. His paintings were included in various art exhibits in Metro Manila and in the provinces.

Born in Intramuros, Manila, Hidalgo spent his childhood in Rosales, Pangasinan. His parents were the late Juan Peralta Hidalgo of Dingras, Ilocos Norte and Felisa Alberto Sanchez of Tomana, Rosales, Pangasinan.

He married Namnama Garma Prado of Piddig, Ilocos Norte, a former head librarian at the UP-Diliman. They have three daughters: Maria Bituen (b. 1970), Patricia Amor (b. 1971), and Marie Sol (b. 1973).

== Works ==
- Novels: "Tomana" (1971), "Tarumamis" (1973), "Ti Obra Maestra" (1974) "Derraas ken Pannakatnag" (1976), "Apuy iti Ubbog ti Diro" (1977), "Dagiti Kulalanti" (1979), "Saksi ti Kaunggan" (1986)
- Novellas: "Ti Langitmo a Kaibatogak" (1968), Bileg (1968), "Dagiti Annak ti Init Nagsublidan iti Daga" (1978)
- Short Stories: "Bituen ti Rosales," "Tallo a Lallaki ken Maysa a Kari," "Dagiti Panniki ti Montalban," "Taraon dagiti Didiosen," "Proserpina," "Sharon," "Adan," "Orkidia," "Anglem," "Kampilan," "Batekan," "Propeta," "Bituen ni Namnama," "Katedral Ti Rosales"
- Biographies: "Birhen Maria" (1980), "Ti Mensahe ti La Salette" (1982)
- Anthologies/Translation: "Napili a Sarita dagiti Ilokano" (1968), "24 a Napili a Sarita dagiti Ilokano" (1969), "Bituen ti Rosales ken Dadduma Pay a Sarita" (1969), "Napili a Sarita dagiti Aleman" (1970), "Ni Emil ken dagiti Detektib" (1973), "Dagiti Napili a Sinurat manipud iti Literatura Aleman" (1974), "Puso a Balitok" (1978), "Sarsarita idi Ugma manipud Asia para kadagiti Ubbing iti Amin a Lugar" (1988), "Napili a Sarita dagiti Hapones" (1989)

== Awards ==
- Cultural Center of the Philippines (CCP) Gawad CCP Pambansang Alagad ng Sining sa Panitikan (1991)
- U.P. Vanguard Life Achievement Award for Literature (1991)
- Cornelio Valdez Award (1992)
- Sen. Heherson T. Alvarez Award for Literature (1994)
- Pedro Bucaneg Award
