= Life in Progress =

Filipino comic strip series

Life in Progress is a Filipino comic strip series written and illustrated by Julius Villanueva and serialized daily in the Manila Bulletin. It is non-linear and semi-autobiographical, set in a surreal universe filled with aliens, dinosaurs, and pop culture references. It centers on the life of Zeke and other characters and their interactions. Common themes include college life, love relationships, escapism, and rejection.

== History ==
The series first appeared in the comic section of the Manila Bulletin in 2003. The first book collection was released by Psicom Publishing in 2007. It was followed by a second book, Geek Machine Telemetry, in 2008. A third collection, Tales of Minor Awesomeness, was released in 2010. The newest collection is entitled Chronicles from the Discomfort Zone.

== Characters ==
- Zeke - Described by the author in the first book as a geek, torpe, loser, and a sheltered introvert. He is constantly ridiculed (even threatened) by his friends and enemies, as well as by his brother and his talking dog.
- 'Dre - Her real name is Andrea. Zeke’s stoic and irascible best friend, she is versed in six different martial arts, and she uses her expertise both to hurt and protect Zeke.
- Cats - Described as the only voice of reason among the group of friends, she acts as a matchmaker at times. She is Franchie’s object of affection, but continually turns him down. It is later revealed that her real name is Amanda, but even her boyfriend Gavin does not know about it.
- Franchie - Dubbed the "King of Hairgel". Described as a comic book uber geek, Franchie has trouble distinguishing where his comic book fueled fantasies end and where his real life begins. He has a superhero alter-ego of his own making called the Masked Spider. He is madly in love with Cats.
- Wang - In the first book, he is characterized as being narcissistic and mentally challenged. He loves using rude, annoying and sometimes misogynistic pick-up lines on girls. This usually ends with him getting slapped in the face.
- M (a.k.a. Moises) - He is the comic strip's obnoxious freeloader. He has orange hair with stripes on it. He loves extreme sports like skateboarding and parkour, which is unfortunate because he is also accident prone.
- Felmar - He is described in the first book as a sagacious overstaying student. He is inclined towards the arts and has a talent for playing the guitar. He has a metal band called Skullduggery.
- RD - He is Zeke's younger brother. Despite being younger, the first book described him as being smarter than Zeke. He is frequently at odds with his older brother.
- Barney - Zeke's talking dog. He hates humans despite being well pampered. He believes all dogs are wolves and humanity has leashed and tamed the lupine inside every canine. He has never spoken in the presence of anyone else except Zeke.

=== Minor characters ===
- Gavin - Cats's boyfriend. He doesn't seem to know his girlfriend very well.
- Peaches - a campus crush who accepted Zeke for what he is and became his girlfriend in the middle of the series. However, due to a misunderstanding over Zeke's punching her father and his being a prom date to a friend, they broke up a year ago.
- Joan - She was Zeke's first heartbreak.
- Charo - She is an obsessed stalker of Zeke.
- Nacho - A gay man who once crushed on Zeke. He now appears to be addicted to the games FarmVille and Plants vs. Zombies.
- Carla - She is Zeke's cousin who is a Star Wars fan and has a great appetite for food.
- Becky - She is Cats's cousin and Nacho's best friend.
- Ice - She is one of Zeke's antagonists. She disliked and disapproved of Zeke for her friend Peaches and blames him for what she sees as a friendship destroyed. Her circle of friends are said to be the "Sisterhood of Evil."
- Sasquatch - He constantly bullies Zeke, especially when he started dating Peaches. His real name is later revealed to be Stacy Joy.
- Romnik - He gets a kick out of calling Zeke names and challenging him to fights that Zeke can't back out of.
- Prof. Kilay - A professor with a prominent pair of eyebrows.
- Prof. Patrick Cruz - A professor with malicious tendencies toward his female students. He claims to have appeared once in an Eat Bulaga contest.
- Prof. Rosal - Described as a terror teacher.
- Manong Brutus - He is the security guard in the school where Zeke and his gang attend classes. To portray his strict enforcement of school security measures, he was once shown performing a cavity search on M for failing to wear his ID.
- Zeke's parents - They were engaged in a shotgun marriage nineteen years ago. Zeke thinks that his parents ignore him.
- Hermes - M's pet monkey.

== Continuity, themes and devices ==
The comic follows the gag-a-day format of a traditional comic strip. However, references are also made to past events. An example of an event that would be sometimes referenced is Zeke’s being turned down by Joan. Since the story centers on college life, there is a certain realistic progression of time such as when final exams or semester breaks are depicted.

Usually, a collection of continuous strips may contain a common theme, such as philosophical views or the events of a certain time period. The usual themes include college life, love relationships, escapism, and rejection. Many of these are shared by Zeke’s friends or family, but only Zeke is involved in all of them.

One of the more common humor devices in the comic is referring to pop-culture icons and then having them appear within the series. At times, this is portrayed as escapist imagination (such as when Franchie becomes the Masked Spider). Other times, pop culture icons are portrayed as becoming real and apparent in Zeke’s presence (such as when Zeke communicates directly with God). Because most of the characters act as if these encounters are not real, this may lead to confusion.
