= El Debate (Argentina) =

Argentine newspaper

El Debate is an Argentine newspaper, published in Zárate, Buenos Aires. The newspaper dates back to 1900, where it began in paper format and later became an online-only publication.

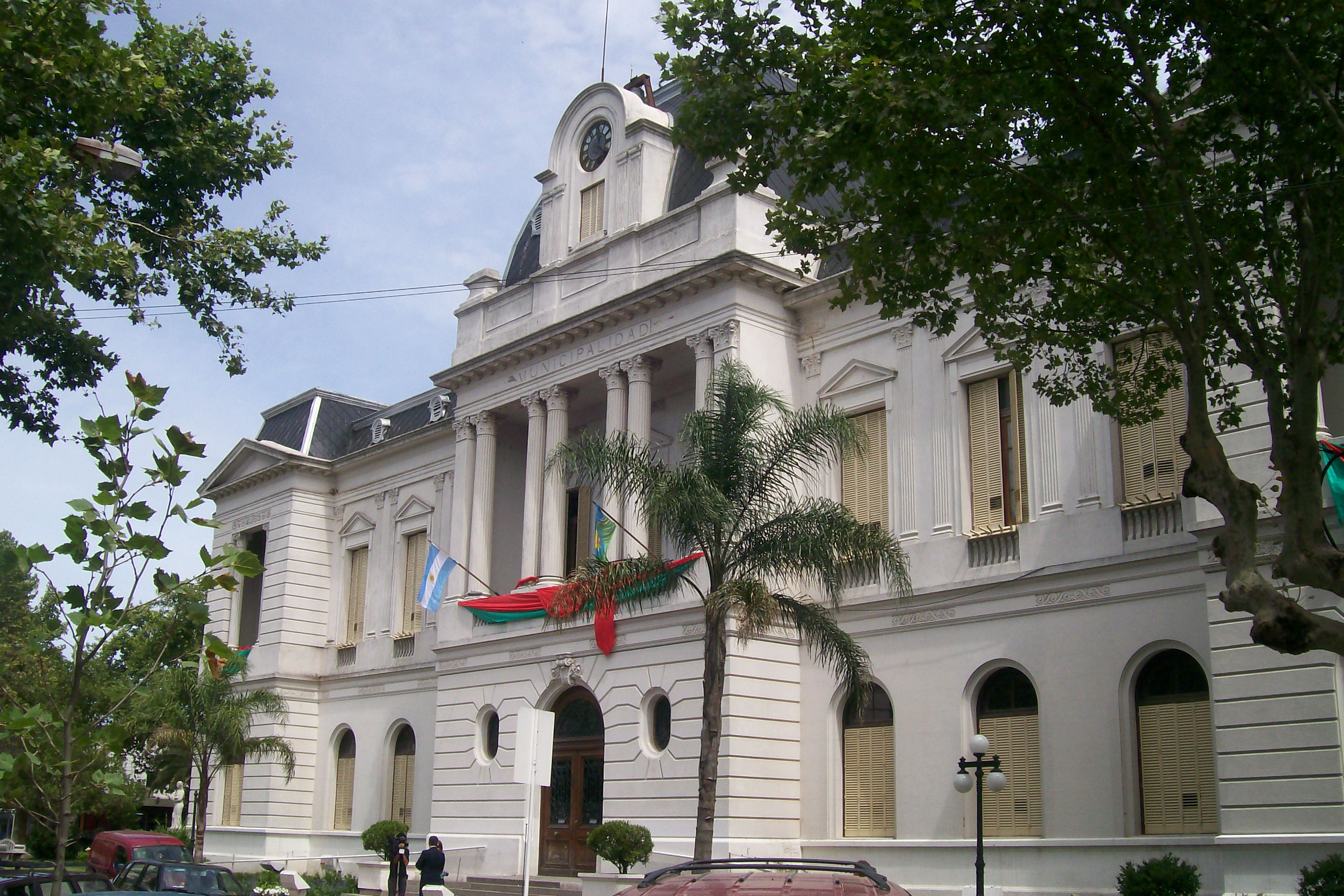
The building of the Municipality of Zárate was built at the initiative of the founder of El Debate, Luis Güerci.

== History ==
El Debate is the leading newspaper in the city of Zárate, located north of the province of Buenos Aires, Argentina. It was founded on July 1, 1900, by the conservative politician, Luis Güerci, with José Massoni being the first director. This first stage lasted until 1928. In this year, and during the presidency of Hipólito Yrigoyen, the title had to suspend editing. In a second stage it reappeared on November 8, 1934, this time directed by Juan Albano. On March 6, 1940, the founder, then a senator, was mortally wounded in a shooting that compromised the continuity of the newspaper, which, despite this, continued to produce 10,000 copies a day. On this second occasion it remained until 1996 when it was closed again. Finally, after closing for a year, it was acquired by the Serpein group, the current owner of the medium, becoming an online newspaper, a format that it maintains to this day.

== Bibliography ==
- "Los periodistas y sus medios gráficos, más de un siglo de historia zarateña". June 7, 2021.
- "Cómo se informaban los zarateños en las primeras épocas del siglo XX". Enlace Crítico (in Spanish). February 13, 2021.
- Eco, El. "El Debate de Zárate y el fin de una etapa". El Eco | Información confiable desde Tandil. Noticias las 24 hs. con contenido multimedia exclusivo que solo El Eco Multimedios te puede brindar. (in Spanish).
