= Ilocos Times =

The current Ilocos Times logo.

The Ilocos Times is the longest running community newspaper edited and published in Laoag, Ilocos Norte, Philippines over the past 46 years.

The paper was founded in 1920 although it came out irregularly until October 23, 1957, when it became a weekly with 90% English and 10% Iluko, the vernacular of Northern Luzon, Philippines.

The Ilocos Publishing Corporation, a family-owned entity having its own commercial printing facilities, publishes the paper.

The website edition was constructed in October 2000 primarily aimed at catering to the local news and information needs of Ilocos Norte natives and other Ilocanos living abroad.
