= Liwayway =

Tagalog weekly magazine published in the Philippines

- Categories: Magazine
- Frequency: Monthly
- Circulation: 90,000
- Publisher: Manila Bulletin Publishing Corporation
- First issue: November 18, 1922
- Country: Philippines
- Language: Tagalog / Filipino
- Website: https://liwayway.ph
- ISSN: 1656-9814

Liwayway (Tagalog word meaning "dawn") is a leading Tagalog weekly magazine published in the Philippines since 1922. It contains Tagalog serialized novels, short stories, poetry, serialized comics, essays, news features, entertainment news and articles, and many others. In fact, it is the oldest Tagalog magazine in the Philippines. Its sister publications are Bannawag, Bisaya Magasin, and Hiligaynon.

== History ==
The magazine has its beginning back in 1922 when Ramon Roces, the eldest son of Alejandro Roces, introduced it after the ill-fated Photo News had declined in the market.

Roces, a prominent man in the publishing business, first conceived Photo News. It was a magazine with its own style, carrying eleven languages including (Spanish, Tagalog and English). The idea to have three languages in one magazine was to allow it to cater to all types of readers (Spanish and Spanish-speaking readers, English, American, and English-speaking readers, and Tagalog language and Filipino readers). However, the trilingual magazine failed to attract readers, as some felt there was little value in spending money on material they could not understand.

The sales of the magazine gradually declined and this emotionally affected Roces, but he did not give up. When he returned to Manila from Mindanao, he introduced another magazine patterned after Photo News. Unlike Photo News, the magazine concentrated, however, on making Tagalog (now Filipino) its medium, and outpouring support from the reading public was felt when its maiden issue was finally launched in the market.

The magazine was named Liwayway, meaning dawn. It made significant contribution to the field of literature when it introduced the popular masterpieces of great Filipino poets and writers like Jose Corazon de Jesus, Florentino Collantes, Julian Cruz Balmaceda, Cecilio Apostol Borromeo, Lope K. Santos, Inigo Ed Regalado, Romualdo Ramos, Francisco Lacsamana, Fausto Galauran and Pedrito Reyes, the son of Severino Reyes who later succeeded him as the editor of Liwayway.

Liwayway became even more popular in the following years and Roces decided to launch sister magazines. This gave birth to other vernacular magazines like Bisaya in 1932, Hiligaynon, a Hiligaynon language-magazine for the Ilonggos and people of Western Visayas in 1934, Bikolano in 1935, and the Ilocano Bannawag in 1940. Liwayway Extra was also launched in 1936, a thicker monthly supplement of Liwayway.

In 1945 during the Liberation of Manila, the combined U.S. and Philippine Commonwealth ground troops to fought by the Japanese forces around the battles in the city, the Japanese Imperial Army took over the supervision of Liwayway and named it Manila Simbunsiya. The Japanese military had hidden agenda: to use the magazine in their military campaign after occupying the Philippines. Later following that period, the Liwayway publication and its management was returned to Don Ramos Roces.

The publication was later sold to Hanz Menzi when Roces retired from publishing business in 1965, but the sudden change in the management of the magazine had a severe impact on the magazine. Its sales declined until Menzi decided to sell the magazine to Manila Bulletin Publishing Corporation.

The management of the Manila Bulletin aimed to preserve the legacy of Liwayway while reformatting the magazine with its modern digital technology. Liwayway was relaunched in 2022.

== Impact ==
Liwayway’s mix of prose with illustration and their wide array of genres benefited not only the magazine itself but other comics and magazines that came after it. After Liwayway began publishing their comic serials, the magazine as well as other comics that followed began to move from short strips to longer, episodic serials mirroring novels. Its impact in molding the genre and the medium has led scholars such as Cynthia Roxas and Joaquin Arevalo Jr. to credit the magazine for essentially giving birth to the comic industry in the Philippines.

In the 1950s, Liwayway began to attract the attention of then-renowned illustrators and writers whose works were continuously sought out by film executives, a result of the close relationship between the comic industry and the film industry during the time. Throughout the decade, over nine films were produced based on stories featured in the magazine. One of the most famous of these adaptations was Bernardo Carpio, which, like most comics within the magazine, featured both a prose version of the story and a serialized comic edition. Written by Fausto Galauran, the serial ran from November 1950 to March 1951, consisting of over eighteen volumes. A film adaptation based specifically on the version featured in the magazine was released by Sampaguita Pictures in the same year, directed by Benjamin Resella and Artemio Tecson.

The impact of Liwayway on women’s writing shows through its authorship. A study conducted by Clarita Arellano reveals that the feminist authorship of Liwayway, though a minority, broke the narrative of ‘otherness’ and silence, giving female voices authority over elements of discourse, general focus, and characterization. The publishing of these short fictions in Liwayway came with a promise of more radical feminist works to follow in its footsteps. In addition to this, two films produced in the 1950s were also based upon these female-led comics published in the magazine, Aristokrata and Despatsadora, both dubbed as ‘women’s films’ by Joyce Arriola as they cater to women's concerns either in terms of female representation or female spectator-ship.

The magazine also produced several important artists in the local scene, such as Severino Reyes, Vicente A. Dizon, and Antonio S. Velasquez. It had a specific impact upon artist Francisco Coching, who grew up with the magazine and its stories. In the 1920s, Liwayway conducted a literary contest to find newer talents to feature in their magazine, one of which was Coching's father Gregorio Coching who won for his novel Sanggumay in 1925. Coching began working as an apprentice for the magazine in 1936, working on photo-engraving and inking layouts for advertisements and later going on to illustrating covers for the magazine in 1937. In 1946, Liwayway published his comic serial Hagibis, which was later adapted into a movie in 1950 starring Fernando Poe Sr.

The magazine was home to several stories and narratives that are still known and loved to this day. In 1925, Severino Reyes, who also worked as an editor for the magazine, began writing short stories in the series ‘Ang mga Kuwento ni Lola Basyang,’ using the ‘Basyang’ name as his own pseudonym. Following its publication, the ‘Basyang’ stories were adapted for radio, television, and film.

== Content ==
Liwayway is best known for popularizing the comic serial style, which combines visual material with prose to create novel-like narratives. Illustrations featured heavily in both the magazine's content and some of its covers, especially older ones. Short prose without visual aids such as ‘Ang mga Kuwento ni Lola Basyang’ were also featured in the magazine. Today, the magazine publishes novels, short stories, poetry, flash fiction, speculative fiction, and other similar genres. Aside from comics and fiction, the magazine also features a number of editorial articles and pieces on lifestyle, culture, and celebrity news.

== New image ==
The magazine has a glossy colorful cover and pages were reduced down to 48; the size, however, is made bigger by 1 inch than the normal size of the old Liwayway.

The content was also improved with novels by veteran writers like Efren Abueg, Elena Patron, Gilda Olvidado, and Lualhati Bautista. It also carried work in different categories like Short Story (Maikling Kuwento), Children's Story (Kuwentong Pambata), Horror Story (Kuwentong Kababalaghan), and Feature Stories (Lathalain). The comics series have been revived and works of popular and veteran writers like Pablo Gomez and Rod Salandanan are the frontline, together with Sophia Esteban Resano whose horror stories are fast selling in the market.

Artworks of comic illustrators like Rico Rival, Jun Lofamia, Rod Lofamia, Rudy Villanueva, Abe Ocampo, Louie Celerio, and Alfred Manuel were revivals of their old comics series and their works have given a sense of nostalgia to modern Liwayway.

From July to December 2019, it published fortnightly, then from January 2020 onwards it was a monthly magazine.

== See also ==
- Bisaya Magasin
- Bannawag
- Greg Laconsay
- Hiligaynon Magazine
- Manila Bulletin
