= Bannawag =

Bannawag (Iloko word meaning "dawn") is a Philippine weekly magazine published in the Philippines by Liwayway Publications Inc. It contains serialized novels/comics, short stories, poetry, essays, news features, entertainment news and articles, among others, that are written in Ilokano, a language common in the northern regions of the Philippines.

Bannawag has been acknowledged as one foundation of the existence of contemporary Iloko literature. It is through the Bannawag that every Ilokano writer has proved his mettle by publishing his first Iloko short story, poetry, or essay, and thereafter his succeeding works, in its pages. The magazine is also instrumental in the establishment of GUMIL Filipinas, the umbrella organization of Ilokano writers in the Philippines and in other countries.

== History ==
Bannawag magazine was conceived in 1934 when Magdaleno A. Abaya of Candon, Ilocos Sur, who was then a member of the editorial staff of the Graphic magazine, an English weekly published by the Roces Publications, presented the concept of an Ilokano publication to the management of the Graphic magazine. Don Ramos Roces, the owner-publisher of Graphic magazine and other vernacular magazines which included Liwayway, Bisaya and Hiligaynon, scoffed at the idea when Abaya presented the proposal to put a magazine for Ilocanos.

But Abaya did not lose hope until Don Ramos gave his consent-with condition that the first issues were only for a try-out, that after one or two months without improvement in the sales, it would be stopped. Abaya was elated and hurried to find willing companions to help him run the magazine. In the end, he was able to persuade Mauro Peña to be the magazine's assistant and news editor, Francisco Fuentecilla of Zambales as assistant and news editor, and Benjamin Gray, also of Candon, Ilocos Sur, as proofreader. Thus, Bannawag or "Dawn," or the Iloko equivalent of Liwayway, was born.

Bannawag's first issue on November 3, 1934, had a production run of 10,000 copies with a selling price of PHP 0.10 per copy. The magazine was an instant success beyond the belief of Don Ramon, and he allowed the continued publication of the magazine.

When Roces Publications was sold to Hans M. Menzi in 1966, the name was changed to Liwayway Publishing, Inc. Thirty nine years later, in 2005, the publication of Bannawag was transferred to Manila Bulletin Publishing Corporation. Clesencio B. Rambaud, Prudencio Gar. Padios and Juan Al. Asuncion were tasked to man Bannawag. However, Padios migrated to Canada in October 2006 and Ariel S. Tabag of Santa Teresita, Cagayan was recruited to fill in the vacancy,

== New Bannawag ==
Bannawag underwent significant metamorphosis when its publication when taken over by the Manila Bulletin, from its content, color, quality of paper used, page layout, and other aspects to keep up with the needs of the times. These changes made the magazine more prestigious in its tasks in bringing entertainment, information, and inspiration to millions of readers in the language spoken by hardly Ilocanos and in depicting the different aspects of the Ilocano character.

Recently, it was picked up by the department of education as one of the important references of the educational system in Ilocano-speaking areas in the country.

== Present ==
Bannawag has gone a long way from its 10-centavo cost for each edition in the 1930s and is moving vigorously to live up the past as an important part of today and tomorrow's dream of the Ilocanos.

== Diamond jubilee ==
Bannawag celebrated its diamond jubilee on November 3, 2009. In celebration of this, Bannawag launched the planting of Bannawag Diamond Jubilee trees in municipal parks and lots, school sites, and other public spaces. Jim Domingo, a retired professor and university official of Cagayan State University, was instrumental in the planting.

== See also ==
- Manila Bulletin
- Liwayway
- Greg Laconsay
- Hiligaynon magazine
- Bisaya Magasin
