= Hiligaynon (magazine) =

Philippine weekly magazine

Hiligaynon is the leading Ilonggo weekly magazine published in the Philippines since 1934. It contains Ilonggo serialized novels, short stories, poetry, serialized comics, essays, news features, entertainment news and articles, and many others. Hiligaynon is named after one of the most predominantly spoken language amongst the people of Western Visayas and Soccsksargen region. Hiligaynon closed during the notorious Martial Law era, but was resurrected in 1989.

== Objective ==
Hiligaynon magazine aims to preserve the rich culture and literature, unique traditions and colorful festivities of the Ilonggo people.

== History ==
Hiligaynon magazine was first published in 1934. It promotes Ilonggo culture and arts by printing articles in the native language, thus giving non-English Ilonggo readers a better understanding of their own heritage.

The birth of Hiligaynon magazine was inspired by the successes of its sister-publications Liwayway magazine, Bisaya magazine and Bannawag founded by Don Ramon Roces of Ramon Roces Publishing, Inc., who also handles the Manila Bulletin.

During the Second World War, the combined U.S. and Philippine Commonwealth military ground forces including the local Panay guerrilla resistance fighters was fought against the Japanese Imperial forces led by General Sosaku Suzuki during the Battle for the Liberation of Panay in Western Visayas included the three provinces of Antique (now, Aklan and Antique), Capiz and Iloilo in 1945.

It became an overnight sensation and later, its weekly circulation skyrocketed, reaching 60,000 in the early '60s.

The first editor in the early 1930s was Abe Gonzales, who was followed by Ulisis Vadlit in the early 1940s. Later on, Francis Jamolangue became the third editor of Hiligaynon magazine in 1966. Under Jamolangue, the staff were Gorgonio Lozarito as managing editor, Pet Vael Jr, Jan Marcella, Ernesto Javellana and Nerio Jedeliz, Jr.

Hans Menzi, a war veteran, had acquired Ramon Roces Publication and named it Liwayway Publishing, Inc. Later on, Francis Jamolangue retired and Atty. Raymundo Defante, from Negros Occidental took the editorship. Then Pet Vael Jr. followed when Defante resigned.

However, for no publicly explained reason, Hiligaynon magazine ceased publication in 1973, a year after Martial Law was declared, depriving the Ilonggo people of their cultural and entertainment magazine. At that time, circulation was at its peak, reaching 70,000 copies weekly - printed in full color.

In 1992, after 20 years, Hiligaynon magazine was revived when Don Emilio Yap took ownership of Liwayway Publishing, Inc. The revival editor was Quin Baterna with the following staff members: Gaudencio Golez, associate editor; Bebot Daquita, literary editor; Joe Galiza, managing editor, Rex Hidalgo, feature and movie editor; and John Hingco, staff member.

After working as editor of the magazine for several months, Quin Baterna transferred the responsibility of editorship to Gaudencio Golez to concentrate on his realty business. When Golez died due to a serious illness, Nerio Jedeliz Jr. assumed editorship and is presently at the magazine's helm.

== Popular writer ==
The birth of Hiligaynon magazine paved way to discovering prolific Ilonggo writers like Conrado Norada, who later became governor of Iloilo, and Ramon Muzones, who also became an Iloilo city councilor. They wrote romantic novels and inspiring short stories.

== See also ==
- Bisaya Magasin, Cebuano equivalent
- Bannawag, Ilocano equivalent
- Liwayway, Tagalog equivalent
- Manila Bulletin
