= Bisaya Magasin =

Filipino Cebuano-language magazine

Bisaya Magasin is a weekly Cebuano magazine now published by the Manila Bulletin Publishing Corporation, Philippines. It has the record of being the oldest magazine in Cebuano which is still published, and "the most successful periodical in Cebuano" (CCP, p. 542).

== History ==
Bisaya Magasin was established by Ramon Roces upon the request of Cebuano poet Vicente Padriga, who became its first editor. Its first issue appeared on August 15, 1930, as part of the magazines published by Liwayway Publishing, Inc.

During the Second World War, the combined U.S. and Philippine Commonwealth ground troops including the local Visayan guerrilla resistance fighters was fought against the Japanese Imperial forces led by General Sosaku Suzuki during the Battle for the Liberation of Visayas in 1945. Bisaya stopped publication; it was revived on August 14, 1946. It had an initial circulation of 5,000, which rose to around 60,000 in the 1960s.

In June 1948, Bisaya started a monthly sister publication, Saloma, a literary pamphlet which carried a complete novel in every issue. Saloma lasted until the late 1950s, with a circulation ranging from 8,000 to 22,000.

== Popular writers ==
Bisaya magazine is considered the barometer for Visayan literary artist. Many Cebuano literary stalwarts made their names in the pages of Bisaya: Natalio Bacalso, Severino Retuya, Marcel Navarra, Piux Kabahar, Sulpicio Osorio, Estrella Alfon, Lina Espina-Moore, and President Carlos P. Garcia.

Contemporary Cebuano writers today, such as Gremer Chan Reyes with his historical novel about Cebu entitled Ang Ugma Walay Pag-abot (English: Tomorrow Will Not Come; Tagalog: Hindi Darating Ang Bukas), currently serialized in Bisaya. From Atty. Ver Quimco's legal column to Prof. Amelia Bojo's opinion pieces, and a host of others, Bisaya offers a variety of reading fare.

== Content ==
Bisaya has a balanced content (40% literary and 60% popular). Ang Gugma Walay Pag-abot means "Love Can't Wait"

== Award ==
One of the latest accolades Bisaya received together with its sister regional publications Bannawag, Liwayway and Hiligaynon is the Diamond Cultural Award presented by Publishers Association of the Philippines on December 12, 2008, in Baguio, Philippines.

== List of editors ==
- Vicente Padriga (1930-1931)
- Natalio Bacalso (1931-1933)
- Flaviano Boquecosa (1933-1941)
- Maximo Bas (1946-1949)
- Francisco Candia (1949-1966)
- Marcelino Navarra (1966-1973)
- Nazario D. Bas (1973-1986)
- Tiburcio Baguio (1986-1995)
- Santiago R. Pepito, Jr. (1995-2001)
- Mariano Y. Mañus, Jr. (managing editor) (2001-2005)
- Edgar S. Godin (associate editor) (2005-2019)
- Richel G. Dorotan AKA Omar Khalid (associate editor) (2019-2024)
- Leonel B. Quillo (2024- present)

== See also ==
- Hiligaynon
- Bannawag
- Liwayway
- Manila Bulletin
