= United News =

Newspaper published in Manila

- The front page of the United News on July 1, 2016
- Type: Daily newspaper
- Format: Broadsheet
- Owner(s): United Daily Press, Inc.
- Editor-in-chief: Mike G. Jamisola
- Founded: 2015
- Political alignment: Centre to Centre-right
- Language: English
- Headquarters: Binondo, Manila, Philippines
- Website: www.unitednews.net.ph/en/

The United News, formerly the United Daily Press, is a national broadsheet newspaper published in Manila, the Philippines. Published by United Daily Press, Inc., the newspaper is the English-language edition of the United Daily News, the Philippines' second-largest Chinese-language newspaper.

== Editorial team ==
The editorial team includes Mike G. Jamisola as editor-in-chief, Jude Torres as managing editor and Delfin Sd. Perez as business section editor. Columnists include Alice H. Reyes, Angie Corro and Atty. Romulo Lumauig.
