= Global Daily Mirror =

The Global Daily Mirror (GDM) is a published daily national newspaper and social media news organization established in 1950 with editorial and business office located in Pasig, Philippines.

GDM published its last edition on July 3, 2020, citing the impact of the COVID-19 pandemic to its editorial and printing operations. Months after, it was relaunched and renamed as the Global Daily Mirror, initially as an online news website and later on June 1, 2022, it was republished as a national broadsheet.

Formerly known as The Mindanao Daily Mirror, the Davao City–based newspaper, was founded by Dean Demetrio Flaviano and Anita Jacela Flaviano.
