= SunStar Davao =

Daily newspaper in the Philippines

- Type: Daily newspaper
- Format: Tabloid
- Editor-in-chief: Reuel John Lumawag (former editor in chief Stella Estremera)
- News editor: Wenz Mendoza
- Founded: 1995
- Language: English, Cebuano
- Headquarters: Davao City
- Website: www.sunstar.com.ph/DAVAO

SunStar Davao is an English language community newspaper published daily by SunStar Davao Publishing, Inc. with editorial and business office at Door 11, Ebro-Pelayo Building 1, Juan Luna St., Barangay 29-C, Davao City. The main product of SunStar Davao Publishing Inc. is the SunStar Davao, an English community newspaper circulated in Davao city, but it also publishes the SunStar Superbalita Davao, a Cebuano language tabloid.

SunStar Davao is Davao City's most sought after community content provider in both print and online. It is part of the SunStar news network in the Philippines.

Sun.Star Davao started as a bi-weekly newspaper Peryodiko Dabaw in December 1985 by Elpidio G. Damaso as the so-called alternative press during the end days of the Marcos dictatorship. It started publishing five times a week the following year and was relaunched as Ang Peryodiko Dabaw on September 7, 1987, marking the entry of new investors and its use of desktop publishing, while its Davao City competitors were still using letterpress. It became Sun.Star Davao in 1995 when the Sun.Star Daily of Cebu, under the leadership of its erstwhile chair Atty. Jesus B. Garcia, envisioned setting up a network of community newspapers that will redefine newspapering in the country. Soon after, Sun.Star Davao became the first community newspaper available online, way ahead of its affiliates in all other areas in the country and way before the Sun.Star News Network (Sunnex) was established. With the establishment of Sunnex, the online presence of the Sun.Star Network has been turned over to this affiliate as Sun.Star Davao focuses on its published products that include the Sun.Star Davao newspaper, the Sun.Star Davao Superbalita, and the Davao yearbook, being a content provider, and interacting in social media.

== See also ==
- SunStar Cebu
