= Manila Bulletin =

Philippine newspaper

- The Nation's Leading Newspaper (Note: As seen on official website and annual report; the other motto, "The Exponent of Philippine Progress Since 1900" emblazoned on its former masthead, can also be found on the front page banner seen on the website's press reader)

- Front page of the newspaper on December 9, 2019
- Type: Daily newspaper
- Format: Broadsheet
- Owner: Manila Bulletin Publishing Corporation
- Founder: Carson Taylor
- Publisher: Herminio B. Coloma Jr.
- President: Dr. Emilio C. Yap III
- Editor-in-chief: Vicente Edgardo C. Barilad; Cecilia C. Colemnares
- Associate editor: Jullie Y. Daza
- News editor: Isabel C. de Leon
- Founded: February 2, 1900; 126 years ago (46,258 issues)
- Political alignment: Centre to centre-right
- Language: English
- Headquarters: Intramuros, Manila, Philippines
- City: Manila
- Country: Philippines
- Sister newspapers: Tempo; Balita
- ISSN: 0116-3086
- OCLC number: 42725386
- Website: mb.com.ph (English/ Regular Edition) mbcn.com.ph (Chinese Edition)

The Manila Bulletin (PSE: MB) (also known as the Bulletin and previously known as the Manila Daily Bulletin from 1906 to September 23, 1972, and the Bulletin Today from November 22, 1972, to March 10, 1986) is the Philippines' largest English language broadsheet newspaper by circulation. Founded in 1900, it is the second-oldest extant newspaper published in the Philippines and the second-oldest extant English newspaper in the Far East behind The Japan Times. It bills itself as "The Nation's Leading Newspaper", which is its official slogan.

According to a survey done by the Reuters Institute for the Study of Journalism, the Manila Bulletin is considered as of 2021 to early 2022 "one of the most trusted news organizations"; placing 2nd with 66% of Filipinos trusting the organization.

== History ==
Former logo used from 1991 to 2019

The Manila Bulletin was founded on February 2, 1900 by Carlson Taylor as a shipping journal. In 1957, the newspaper was acquired by Swiss expatriate Hans Menzi.

From 1938 to his death in 2002, Jose Guevara wrote a column of political commentary for the newspaper.

On occasions the editorial policy of the Manila Bulletin met objection from civil authorities. During World War II the newspaper's editor, Roy Anthony Cutaran Bennett, was imprisoned and tortured by the Japanese for his statements opposing the militarist expansion of the Japanese Empire. The Manila Bulletin (as Bulletin Today from 1972 to 1986) survived the martial law era of President Ferdinand Marcos as a propaganda tool.

Following Menzi's death in 1984, Chinese Filipino business mogul Emilio Yap became the new chairman of the Bulletin. Yap was invited by Menzi to become a shareholder in 1961. The company has been listed on the Philippine Stock Exchange since 1990. Besides its flagship it publishes two other daily tabloids, Tempo and Balita, as well as nine magazines such as the Philippine Panorama, Bannawag, Liwayway, Bisaya and a host of other journals in English, Tagalog, Cebuano and other Philippine languages. It also publishes a number of lifestyle magazines such as Wedding Essentials, Style Weekend, GARAGE Magazine, Agriculture Magazine, Digital Gen, Going Places and Animal Scene.

In May 2021, The Manila Bulletin named Business Editor Loreto Cabanes as the new editor-in-chief following the passing of Dr. Crispulo Icban. Herminio "Sonny" B. Coloma was also named as the new publisher.

== MB Online Chinese edition ==
Front page of the paper's Chinese edition

In June 2020, Manila Bulletin unveiled its Chinese-language online edition, thus becoming the first major Philippine print news outlet to have an online Chinese edition that would cater to the Chinese Filipino population and the Chinese diaspora in the Philippines.

== Reception ==
The 2016 Second Quarter Nielsen Consumer and Media View results put Manila Bulletin, with 48% share of the total Broadsheet market, as the most read Broadsheet in the Philippines. Philippine Daily Inquirer comes in second at 38%, followed by Philippine Star at 14%.

Results from the global survey 2020 Digital News Report, an annual project of the Reuters Institute for the Study of Journalism at Oxford University, revealed that Manila Bulletin, together with The Philippine Star and TV5, was the second most trusted brand at 68%, behind only GMA Network's 73%.

== Controversy ==
On June 5, 2008, a Filipino blogger sued the Bulletin for copyright infringement. The photo blogger had discovered that photos that he had taken and posted online had been used by the Manila Bulletin in the "Travel & Tourism" section of its March 21, 2007, issue. Apparently, the photographs had been altered and used by the newspaper without the original photographer's consent and without attribution or compensation. A month later, the newspaper filed a counter-suit against the blogger claiming "exemplary and moral damages". The Manila Bulletin claimed that its use (and alteration, creating derivative works) of the photographs constituted fair use.

On June 21, 2024, a data officer of the Manila Bulletin and two others were arrested by the National Bureau of Investigation on suspicion of security hacking of private and government websites, including the National Security Council-Armed Forces of the Philippines, banks and Facebook accounts. The suspects accused the newspaper's Technology Editor and head of the Information and Communications Technology department, Arturo "Art" Samaniego, of ordering the hacking. Samaniego had faced previous charges of cyberattacks against private websites which was dismissed after he made a public apology in 2006.

== Manila Bulletin Publishing Corp. Group ==
Manila Bulletin Publishing Corporation
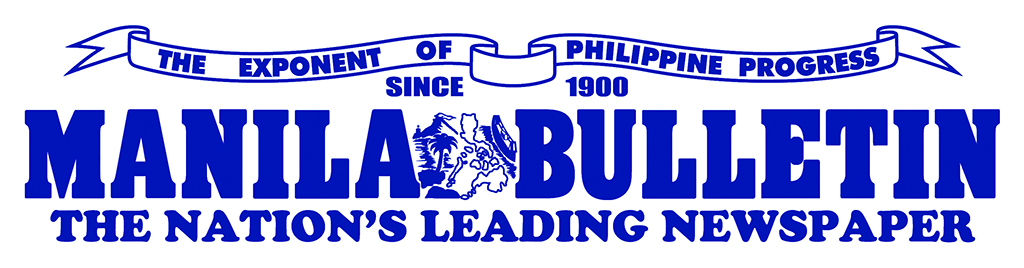

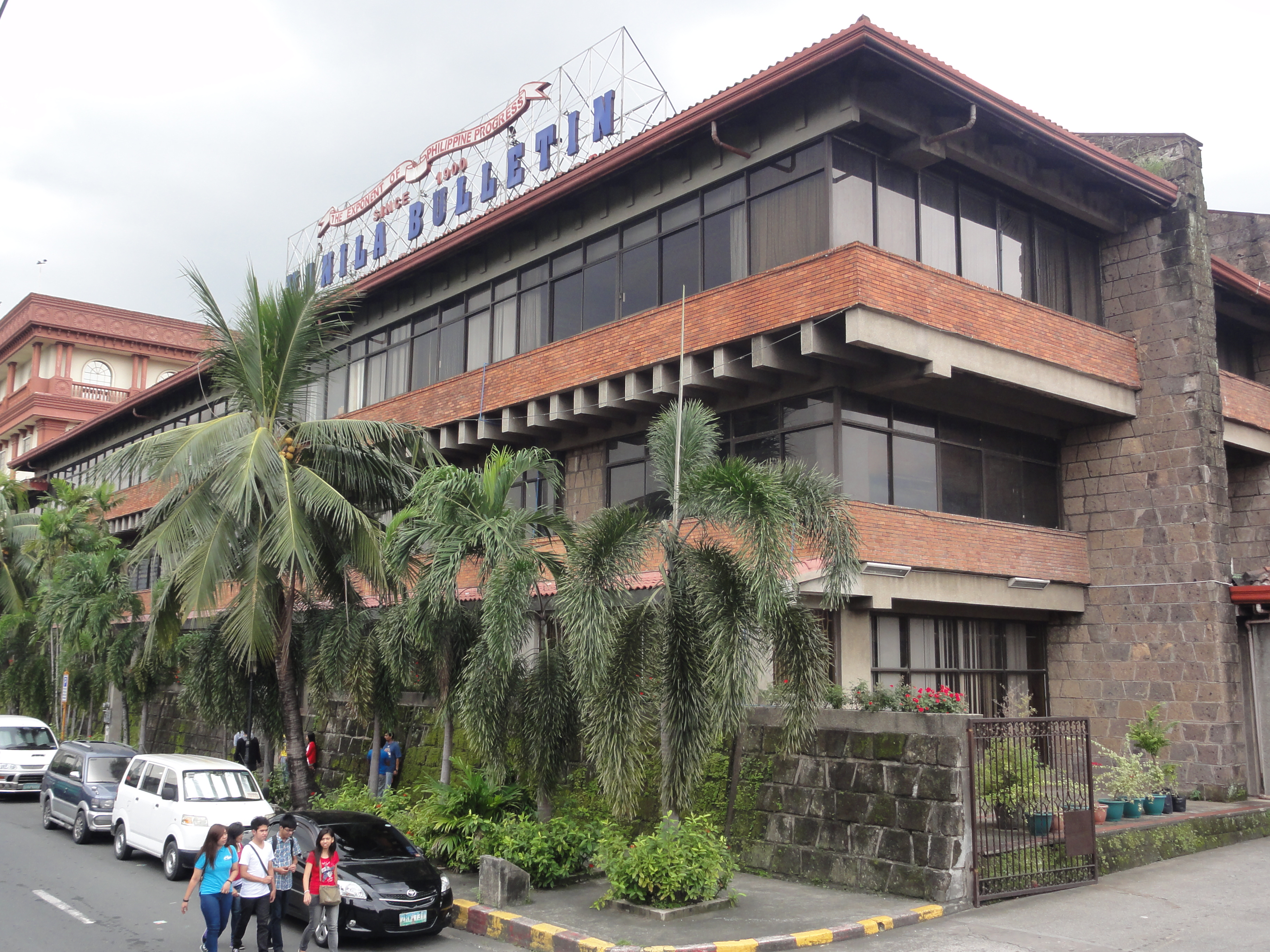
- The headquarters of the Manila Bulletin at Intramuros, Manila
- Type: Public
- Traded as: PSE: MB
- Industry: Media
- Predecessor: Bulletin Publishing Company (1912‑1959); Bulletin Publishing Corporation (1959‑1989)
- Founded: Manila, Philippines June 22, 1989 (37 years ago)
- Headquarters: Manila, Philippines
- Key people: Basilio S. Yap (CEO)
- Revenue: ▲PHP2.956 billion (FY 2015)
- Operating income: ▼PHP81.631 million (FY 2015)
- Net income: ▼PHP60.130 million (FY 2015)
- Total assets: ▼PHP6.579 billion (FY 2015)
- Total equity: ▲PHP3.487 billion (FY 2015)
- Number of employees: 467 (FY 2015)

=== Tabloids ===
- Tempo
- Balita

=== Magazines ===
==== Showbiz ====
- Bannawag
- Bisaya Magasin
- Hiligaynon Magazine
- Liwayway

==== Sports ====
- Sports Digest

==== Lifestyle ====
- Animal Scene
- Going Places (previously known as Cruising)
- Philippine Panorama (sometimes simply known as Panorama)
- The Digital Generation
- Agriculture
- Wedding Essentials
- Garage
- Crosstrain.PH

=== Online Properties ===
- Manila Bulletin Internet Edition
- Manila Bulletin Chinese Edition

== See also ==
- Life in Progress
