= SunStar =

Newspaper in the Philippines

- December 17, 2006 frontpage issue of SunStar Cebu
- Owner: SunStar Publishing Inc.
- Founded: November 25, 1982; 43 years ago
- Political alignment: Centre to centre-left
- Language: English
- Headquarters: Cebu City, Philippines
- Website: www.sunstar.com.ph

SunStar (also written as Sun Star), stylized as SUNSTAR (formerly SUN•STAR), is an English-language newspaper in the Philippines. It is based in Cebu City.

== Regional ==
- SunStar Cebu
- SunStar Davao
- SunStar Manila
- SunStar Dumaguete
- SunStar Bacolod
- SunStar Iloilo
- SunStar Baguio
- SunStar Cagayan de Oro
- SunStar Pampanga
- SunStar Pangasinan
- SunStar Tacloban
- SunStar Zamboanga
