= GUMIL Filipinas =

GUMIL Filipinas (Gunglo dagiti Mannurat nga Ilokano iti Filipinas ken Ballasiw-Taaw), or Association of Ilokano Writers in the Philippines and Overseas, is one of the most active groups of regional writers in the Philippines. It has hundreds of active Ilokano writer-members in different chapters within the Philippines and overseas.

== History ==
The first Ilokano writers' organizations was organized in 1923 when 37 writers organized the Gimong dagiti Umiiluko (Association of Ilokano Writers) in San Fernando, La Union, spearheaded by Cornelio Valdez, a poet and founder of the Northern Luzon College in the capital town. Mena Pecson Crisologo was elected president. When Crisologo died, Ignacio Villamor became president in an election at the Instituto de Mujeres in Manila on October 8, 1927.

Benito S. de Castro, in his feature article in Bannawag magazine on February 29, 1988, said the Gimong dagiti Mannurat nga Ilokano (Ilokano Writers Association) was also organized in 1947 with Benjamin A. Gray elected as president. Its main purpose was to preserve Ilokano, to encourage and improve how to write better Ilokano, and to publish the members' best Ilokano writings.

In the 1960s, Kutibeng (Lyre), an association of Ilokano writers in Manila and suburbs, was organized. Pacifico D. Espanto was elected president.

But Kutibeng did not last long. Guillermo R Andaya, then secretary, accepted the literary editorship of Bannawag. Espanto, the president, was appointed to teach in U.P. Los Baños, Laguna. Benjamin L. Viernes, the vice-president, focused on radio broadcasting. Paul B. Zafaralla, a member of the Board of Directors, was also appointed as instructor in U.P. Los Baños where he eventually became chairman of the humanities department. The interest of the remaining board members, including Jose A. Bragado and Leonardo Q. Belen, waned.

In October 1964, Gunglo dagiti Mannurat iti Iluko (Association of Ilokano Writers) was organized in Ilocos Sur. Pelagio A. Alcantara, then a public school principal, was elected president. Its first project was a literary seminar-workshop in Sta. Maria, Ilocos Sur.

After a few years, Juan S.P. Hidalgo, Jr., a staff member of Bannawag, suggested a change in name to Gunglo dagiti Mannurat nga Ilokano to enable Ilokano writers in Iloko, English, Spanish and other languages to become members.

GUMIL La Union was itself organized in 1966, with Joven Costales as its first president. That same year, GUMIL Abra was also born, with Pacita C. Saludes as president, as was GUMIL Laoag, with Peter La. Julian elected president. In December 1966, GUMIL Manila was organized, with Dr. Hermogenes. F. Belen of La Union, then vice-president for academic affairs and dean of graduate studies of the Philippine College of Arts and Trades, as president.

In 1967, GUMIL Pangasinan was organized, with Mauro F. Guico, a public school principal, as president.

On October 19, 1968, GUMIL Filipinas (Ilokano Writers Association of the Philippines) was organized in Baguio. Arturo M. Padua, then municipal mayor of Sison, Pangasinan, was elected president. The officers took their oath of office before President Ferdinand E. Marcos.

GUMIL Filipinas or Gunglo dagiti Mannurat nga Ilokano iti Filipinas, Inc., was incorporated and registered with the Philippine Securities and Exchange Commission on January 8, 1977.

== Objectives ==
GUMIL Filipinas' main objectives are:

- To provide a forum in which Ilokano writers can undertake common and cooperative efforts to improve their craft of writing literary, historical, research and other works;
- To enrich Ilokano literature and cultural heritage as phases of the national identity by encouraging the members to concentrate on writing extensively and intensively about the social, economic, cultural and other aspects of growth and development among the Ilokanos through literature, history, research, or the like;
- To publish books of poetry, short stories, essays, novels, historical accounts, research and critical studies, and other writings; and
- To assist each member in pursuing his/her writing career and in fulfilling his life as a member of Philippines society.

== Incumbent officers ==
2025-2027

GUMIL Filipinas BOARD

President: Ariel Sotelo Tabag
Vice President: Elizabeth Madarang-Raquel
Secretary-General: Faye Q. Flores-Melegrito
Treasurer: Anna Liza M. Gaspar
Auditor: Rolando A. Seguro, Jr.
Business Manager: Estela A. Bisquera-Guerrero
Public Relations Officer: Mark Louie Tabunan

Board of Directors:

- Avelina Fe Carlos-Camacho
- Dr. Raquelito B. Cenal, Jr.
- Marlyn G. Garcia-Del Rosario
- Delfin P. Dumayas
- Dr. Freddie P. Masuli
- Domingo A. Presa
- Mario T. Tejada
- Neyo E. Valdez

CHAPTER PRESIDENTS

- GUMIL Filipinas Abra: Dr. Maria Teresa G. Bisquera-Beñas
- GUMIL Filipinas Apayao: Remy N. Albano
- GUMIL Filipinas Benguet: Luvimin T. Aquino, Sr.
- GUMIL Filipinas Cagayan: Dr. Raquelito B. Cenal, Jr.
- GUMIL Filipinas Ilocos Norte: Delfin P. Dumayas
- GUMIL Filipinas Ilocos Sur: Dr. Jaime G. Raras
- GUMIL Filipinas Isabela: Dominador Rudolfo
- GUMIL Filipinas La Union SFC: Djuna R. Alcantara
- GUMIL Filipinas Metro Manila: Faye Q. Flores-Melegrito
- GUMIL Filipinas Nueva Vizcaya: Rene Boy Abiva
- GUMIL Filipinas Pangasinan: Fernando B. Sanchez
- GUMIL Filipinas Canada: Prodie G. Padios
- GUMIL Filipinas Oahu: Mila Fernandez

SUB-CHAPTER PRESIDENTS:

- GF Cagayan - Gonzaga: Mario S. Ascueta
- GF Ilocos Norte - MMSU CTE: Ella Mae V. Cariaga
- GF Ilocos Sur - UNP: Jasmine T. Tabbuac
- GF Pangasinan - DepEd Urdaneta: Edmundo A. Bisquera

ADVISERS

- Jose A. Bragado
- Dionisio S. Bulong
- Honor Blanco Cabie
- Arthur P. Urata, Sr.
- Baldovino Ab. Valdez
- Vilmer V. Viloria

CONSULTANTS

- Ricarte A. Agnes
- Cles B. Rambaud
- Judge Plotinus T. Sanchez

== Chapters ==
CHAPTERS

Philippines

- GUMIL Filipinas Abra
- GUMIL Filipinas Apayao
- GUMIL Filipinas Benguet
- GUMIL Filipinas Cagayan
- GUMIL Filipinas Ilocos Norte
- GUMIL Filipinas Ilocos Sur
- GUMIL Filipinas Isabela
- GUMIL Filipinas La Union SFC
- GUMIL Filipinas Metro Manila

GUMIL Metro Manila

- GUMIL Filipinas Nueva Vizcaya
- GUMIL Filipinas Pangasinan

Overseas

- GUMIL Filipinas Canada
- GUMIL Filipinas Oahu

SUB-CHAPTERS

- GF Cagayan - Gonzaga
- GF Ilocos Norte - Mariano Marcos State University College of Teacher Education (MMSU CTE)
- GF Ilocos Sur - University of Northern Philippines (UNP)
- GF Pangasinan - Department of Education Urdaneta (DepEd Urdaneta)

== Balikas ==
Balikas is the official publication of GUMIL Filipinas. Published fortnightly, some issues of Balikas are available through its online edition.

== See also ==
- Ilokano literature
- Ilokano writers
- Literature of the Philippines
