= SunStar Manila =

Online newspaper in the Philippines

- Type: Daily newspaper
- Format: Online
- Owner(s): SunStar Publishing, Inc.
- Editor: Ariel B. Catubig
- Founded: 1999
- Political alignment: Independent
- Language: English
- Headquarters: Unit 701, Tycoon Centre, Pearl Drive, Ortigas Center, Pasig, Metro Manila, Philippines
- Website: www.sunstar.com.ph/manila

The SunStar Manila is a daily online newspaper published in Metro Manila, Philippines. Founded in 1999, the newspaper is owned by the Cebu City-based SunStar group of community newspapers.

Initially a print publication, the SunStar Manila was partially funded by the acquisition of businessman William Gatchalian, also known as the "plastics king" for his dominance of the Philippine plastic industry, of a minority stake in the newspaper: his second attempt at investing in a newspaper after owning a minority share in the SunStar Cebu in the 1980s, which he sold off in 1986. He was invited to invest in the Manila edition as the family of former Transportation Secretary Jesus B. Garcia, which owns the SunStar Cebu and its sister publications, was unable to bankroll a Manila—and therefore truly national—edition on its own. The acquisition was controversial at the time given Gatchalian's closeness to then-President Joseph Estrada as a member of his so-called "midnight cabinet", leading to fears that the newspaper would be used to sway public opinion. This charge was denied by Hector Villanueva, then editor-in-chief of the SunStar Cebu. This was evidenced by the newspaper being one of only a handful of publications printing articles written by the Philippine Center for Investigative Journalism (PCIJ) highlighting the extent of the Estrada family's business holdings, a decision criticized by critics of the PCIJ.

Despite the paper's initial success, with its 2002 daily circulation of 87,000 copies being larger than even more established newspapers such as The Manila Times, the SunStar Manila was not profitable, and publication of the print edition was ultimately ceased in favor of maintaining an online-only edition some time thereafter.

== See also ==
- SunStar
- SunStar Cebu
