= Bicol Standard =

- Type: Newspaper
- Format: Tabloid
- Founder(s): Gil Basmayor, Jr.
- Founded: 1992
- Language: English, Bicolano
- Headquarters: 135 San Jose St., San Felipe, Naga City, Bicol Region, Philippines
- City: Naga
- Country: Philippines
- Circulation: Regional
- Website: http://www.bicolstandard.com

Bicol Standard is a weekly newspaper in the Bicol Region. It covers news from the provinces of Camarines Sur, Camarines Norte, Albay, Sorsogon and Masbate.

== History ==
Newspaper Bicol Standard was established in 1992 by longtime journalist Gil Basmayor, Jr.
