= United Daily News (Philippines) =

Daily Chinese language newspaper in the Philippines

聯合日報 United Daily News
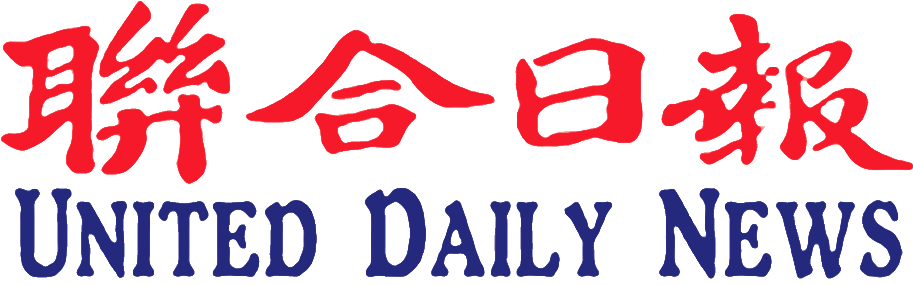

- The front page of the United Daily News on May 5, 2015
- Type: Daily newspaper
- Format: Broadsheet
- Owner(s): United Daily Press, Inc.
- Editor-in-chief: Sy Yinchow (1973–2014)
- Founded: 1973
- Political alignment: Pro-Taiwan
- Language: Chinese
- Headquarters: Binondo, Manila, Philippines
- Circulation: 32,000 (2008)
- Website: http://www.unitednews.net.ph

The United Daily News (Chinese: 聯合日報; Pe̍h-ōe-jī: Liân-ha̍p Li̍t-pò; pinyin: Liánhé Rìbào) is a daily broadsheet newspaper in the Philippines written in the Chinese language. As of 2008, the newspaper had a circulation of 32,000, making it the Philippines' second-largest Chinese-language newspaper in terms of circulation, after the World News.

The newspaper was founded in 1973 by Cheng Kim Tiao, merging two pre-existing Chinese-language newspapers: the Kong Li Po (公理報), founded in 1911, and the Great China Press (大中華日報), established after World War II. Both newspapers were known to be sympathetic to the Kuomintang, with the Kong Li Po even being founded by Wu Ching-ming, Sun Yat-sen's organizer in the Philippines. Its founding editor-in-chief, Sy Yinchow (Chinese: 施穎洲; pinyin: Shī Yǐngzhōu; Pe̍h-ōe-jī: Si Éng-chiu), was the world's longest-serving editor-in-chief, having served in that position at a number of publications since 1945. Known as the "dean of Chinese media practitioners", Sy wrote daily for the newspaper until his death in 2014.

The United Daily News was the only Chinese-language newspaper authorized to publish during the Philippines' martial law era.

In addition to its main Chinese-language edition, the United Daily News also contained an English-language section, which later became its own newspaper called the United News.
