= SunStar Cebu =

Filipino newspaper

- December 17, 2006 frontpage of SunStar Cebu
- Type: Daily newspaper
- Format: Tabloid
- Owner: SunStar Publishing Corporation
- Editor-in-chief: Mildred V. Galarpe (first editor-in-chief: Atty. Pachico A. Seares)
- Founded: November 25, 1982; 43 years ago
- Political alignment: Independent
- Language: English
- Headquarters: Cebu City, Philippines
- City: Cebu City
- Country: Philippines
- Website: www.sunstar.com.ph/cebu

SunStar Cebu, formerly stylized as Sun•Star Cebu (formerly Sun•Star Daily), is a community newspaper in Cebu City, the Philippines. It is the flagship newspaper of the SunStar network of newspapers and is the leading newspaper in both Metro Cebu and the province of Cebu. It was named Sunstar Daily when it was first founded in November 25, 1982, and changed its name to Sunstar Cebu in 2000.

It is also the oldest of the SunStar newspapers, having been in continuous publication since 1982. Its main office is located along P. del Rosario St., Cebu City.

Former logo until 2018

== Awards ==
- "Best Newspaper" - Cebu Archdiocesan Mass Media Awards Hall of Fame (1991, 1992, 1993)
- "Best Edited Daily" - Asia Media Project Konrad Adenauer Foundation and Philippine Press Institute (1997, 1998, 1999)

== See also ==
- SunStar Superbalita Davao
- The Freeman Newspaper
