= CCPC =

CCPC may refer to:

== Colleges ==
- Caloocan City Polytechnic College, predecessor of University of Caloocan City, Manila, Philippines
- Chittagong Cantonment Public College, an educational institution in Bangladesh

== Other ==
- Citizens' Committee for Pollution Control, an environmental organization in Burlington, Ontario, Canada
- Competition and Consumer Protection Commission, Ireland's competition regulator and consumer rights agency
- Crisp County Power Commission, a power commission in the U.S. state of Georgia
- Cuyahoga County Progressive Caucus, a political organization in Cleveland, Ohio
- Cebu Citizens-Press Council, a press council in Cebu City, Philippines
