= Citizen's Committee =

Citizen's Committee may refer to:

- Citizens Committee for a Free Cuba, a defunct American anti-Castro organization
- Citizens' Committee for Children, an American non-profit child advocacy organization
- Citizens' Committee for Pollution Control, defunct Canadian environmental organization

== See also ==
- Citizens Commission on Human Rights
