= Canon de 155 C modèle 1917 Schneider =

Canon de 155 C modèle 1917
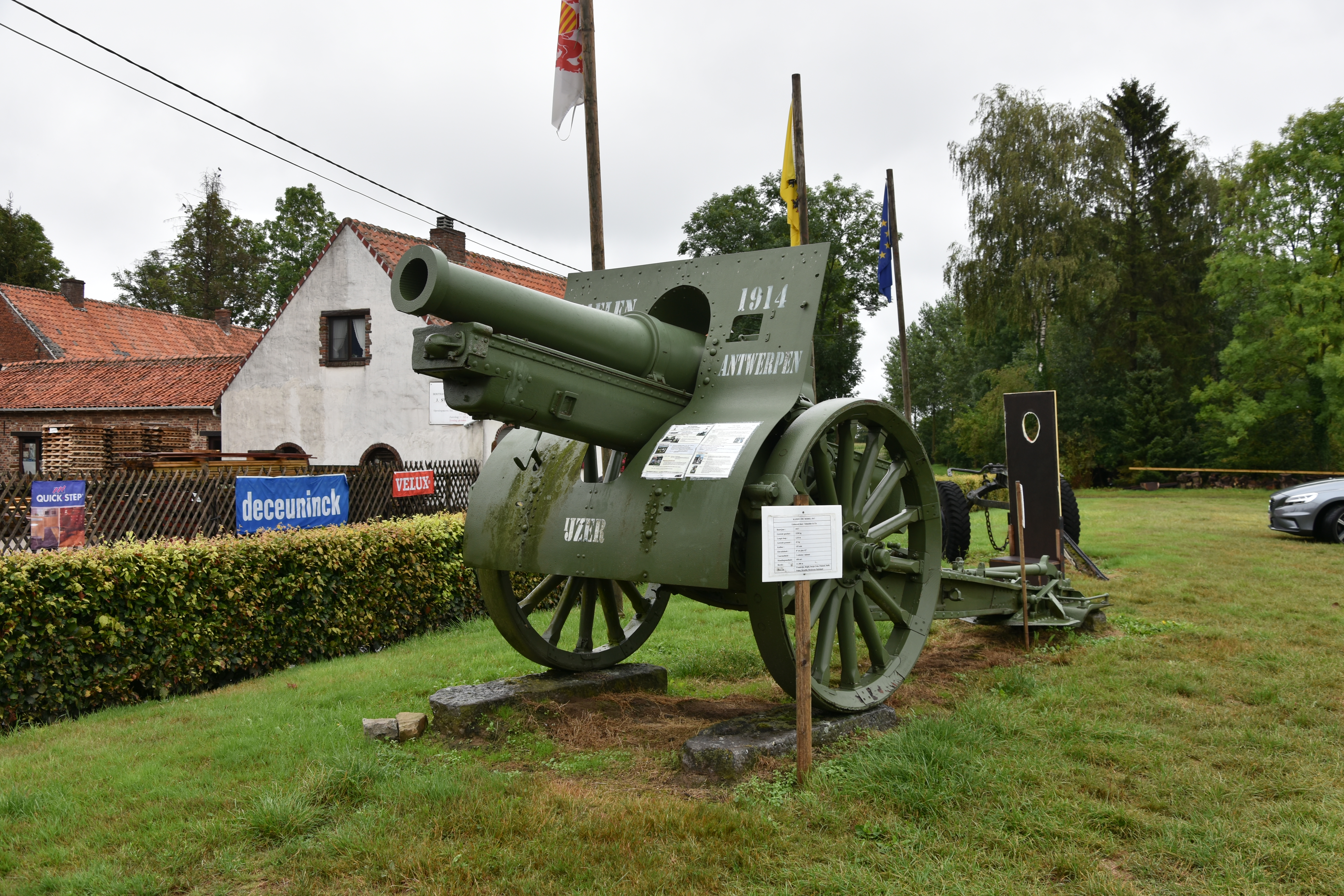
- Canon de 155 C mle 1917, displayed in Halen, Belgium
- Type: Heavy field howitzer
- Place of origin: France

Service history
- In service: 1917–1945
- Used by: See operators
- Wars: List of conflicts: World War I; Polish-Soviet War; Polish–Lithuanian War; Spanish Civil War; Winter War; World War II; Second Sino-Japanese War

Production history
- Designer: Schneider et Cie
- Designed: 1915–1917
- Manufacturer: Schneider et Cie
- Produced: 1916–1918?
- No. built: 3,020
- Variants: See variants

Specifications
- Mass: Mle 1915: 3,220 kg (7,100 lb); Mle 1917: 3,300 kg (7,300 lb)
- Length: Mle 1915: 7.78 m (25 ft 6 in); Mle 1917: 5.78 m (19 ft 0 in)
- Barrel length: Mle 1915: Overall: 2.332 m (7 ft 8 in) L/15; Bore: 1.764 m (5 ft 9 in) L/11.4; Mle 1917: Overall: 2.332 m (7 ft 8 in) L/15; Bore: 1.737 m (5 ft 8 in) L/11.2
- Width: 1.52 m (5 ft 0 in)
- Shell: Mle 1915: Separate-loading brass cased charge; Mle 1917: Separate-loading bagged charge
- Shell weight: Min: 43.0 kg (90 lb); Max: 43.61 kg (100 lb)
- Caliber: 155 mm (6.1 in)
- Breech: Interrupted screw
- Recoil: Hydro-pneumatic
- Carriage: Box trail
- Elevation: 0° / +42°
- Traverse: 3° left / 3° right
- Rate of fire: 3 rpm
- Muzzle velocity: 450 m/s (1,500 ft/s)
- Maximum firing range: 11.2 km (7.0 mi)

The Canon de 155 C modèle 1917 Schneider (or Canon de 155 C Mle 1917 Schneider), often abbreviated as the C17S, was a French howitzer designed by Schneider. It was essentially the Canon de 155 C modèle 1915 Schneider fitted with a different breech to use bagged propellant rather than the cartridge cases used by the older howitzer. It was used by France, Russian Empire, Belgium, Romania, and the United States from 1917 during World War I and was widely exported after the war. Surviving weapons were in service with France, Poland, Greece, Italy, Belgium, the United States, and Finland during World War II. Captured weapons were used by the Germans for their 2nd-line artillery and coast defense units.

== Development and description ==
=== Canon de 155 C modèle 1915 Schneider ===
The Canon de 155 C modèle 1915 was based on Schneider's 152-millimetre (6.0 in) M1910 howitzer that had been sold to the Russian Empire. Schneider later used the M1910 carriage for their long-range Canon de 105 modèle 1913, Canon de 155 L modèle 1877/1914 and Canon de 155 L modèle 1917 guns, so it was relatively simple to mount a new 155 millimetres (6.1 in) barrel on the carriage and recoil system of the gun. Production began in 1915.

The Mle 1915 was a conventional design with a hydro-pneumatic recoil system mounted under the barrel, a gun shield to protect the crew and a box carriage with wooden wheels. It used an interrupted-screw breech with separate-loading ammunition; the shell being loaded first followed by the proper amount of propellant in a brass cartridge case. A loading tray was hinged to the left side of the cradle. It was swung into position after the breech had opened to hold the shell before it was pushed into the chamber, which had a catch to hold the shell in place until it could be rammed, but had to be moved out of the way before the breech could be closed for firing. It could be towed by a team of eight horses if a two-wheeled limber was placed under the trail and the barrel pulled back along the trail to move the center of gravity towards the limber. For (slow) motor-traction no limber was necessary and the trail was hooked directly to the tractor.

The longer barrel and higher muzzle velocity gave the Mle 1915 an extra 2,500 metres (2,700 yd) of range at the high cost of over 1,100 kilograms (2,400 lb) of extra weight over the M1910 Schneider sold to Russia.

=== Canon de 155 C modèle 1917 Schneider ===
The French Army preferred bagged charges for its ammunition because the brass cartridge cases used by the Mle 1915 were expensive to produce, both in money and in the amount of brass required. This became a real problem during the war given the vast number of shells expended and Schneider was asked to redesign the gun to use a de Bange obturator and allow it to use bagged powder. Schneider agreed and adapted the breech of the Canon de 155mm GPF to fit the barrel of the Mle 1915, but this took quite a bit of time due to the press of existing work and the new Mle 1917 howitzer did not enter service until late 1916. The main difference between the Mle 1915 and 1917 was in the breech. Many guns had their loading trays removed because it slowed down the rate of fire; a portable shell tray was used instead by the loaders.

Some three thousand were built. Additionally, many of the Mle 1915s were refitted with the new breech.

== Service history ==
=== Argentina ===
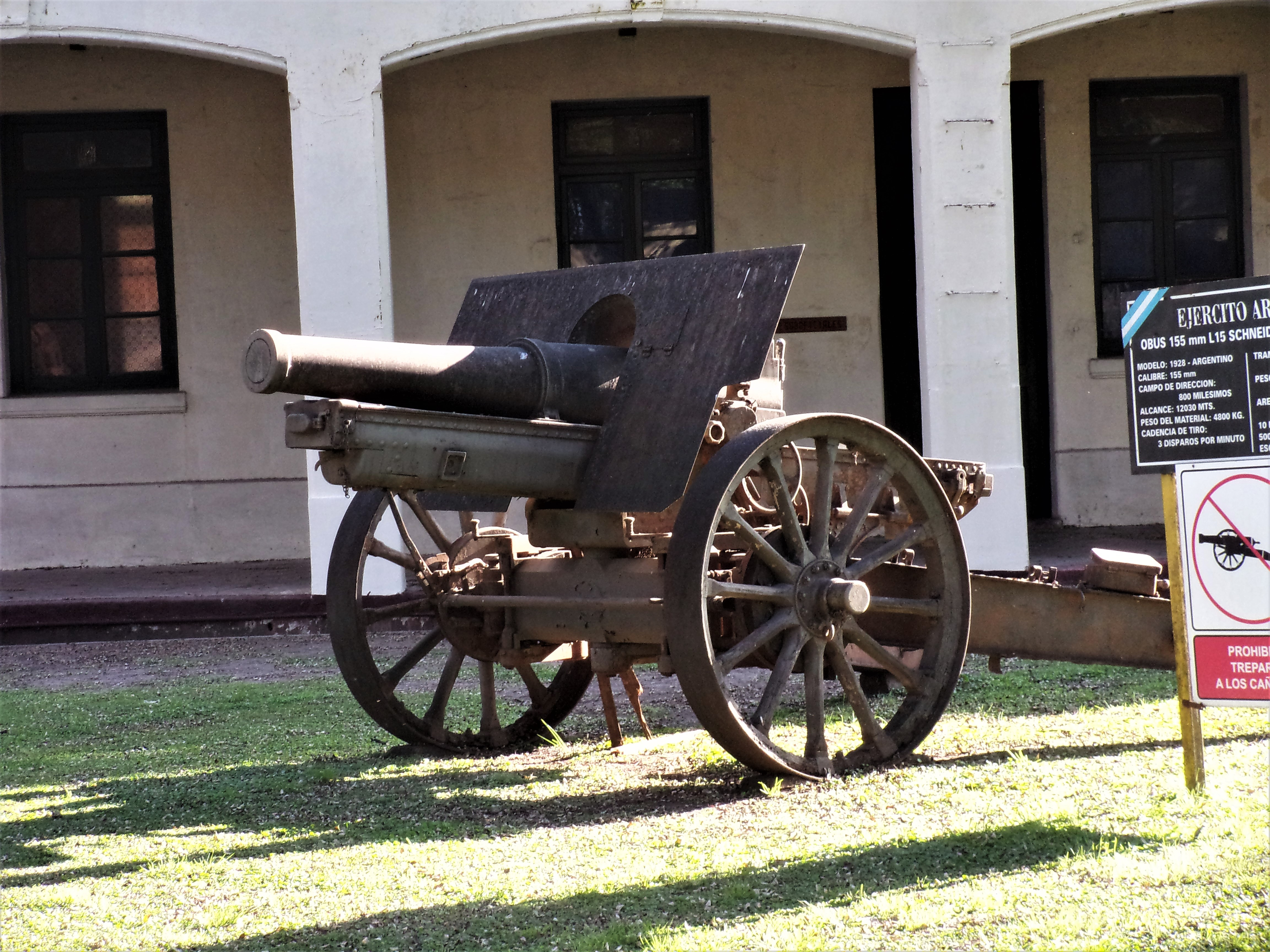
A howitzer at the Museo Histórico del Ejército Argentino

The Argentine Army used an updated variant of this howitzer with split-trail carriage, locally called Obús Schneider L.15.05 modelo 1928 calibre 155 mm. Some of them were still used for training in the 1980s at the Colegio Militar de la Nación. Some were donated to neighboring countries.

=== Belgium ===
Belgium received 134 howitzers from France during World War I. Weapons captured after Belgium's surrender in 1940 received the designation of 15.5 cm sFH 413(b) by the Germans.

=== Bolivia ===
The Bolivian Army received in 1976 a donation of sixteen howitzers from the Argentine Army. Corresponding to both models used in Argentina and known as Obús Schneider L.15.05 modelo 1928 calibre 155 mm and Obús Schneider L.30.05 modelo 1928 calibre 155 mm. The shipment consisted of two batteries (each with four pieces) from each model. The guns are still in service in the artillery regiments ReA-2 "BOLÍVAR" (1st MECHANIZED BRIGADE) and RA-3 "PISAGUA" (3rd ARMY DIVISION).

=== China ===
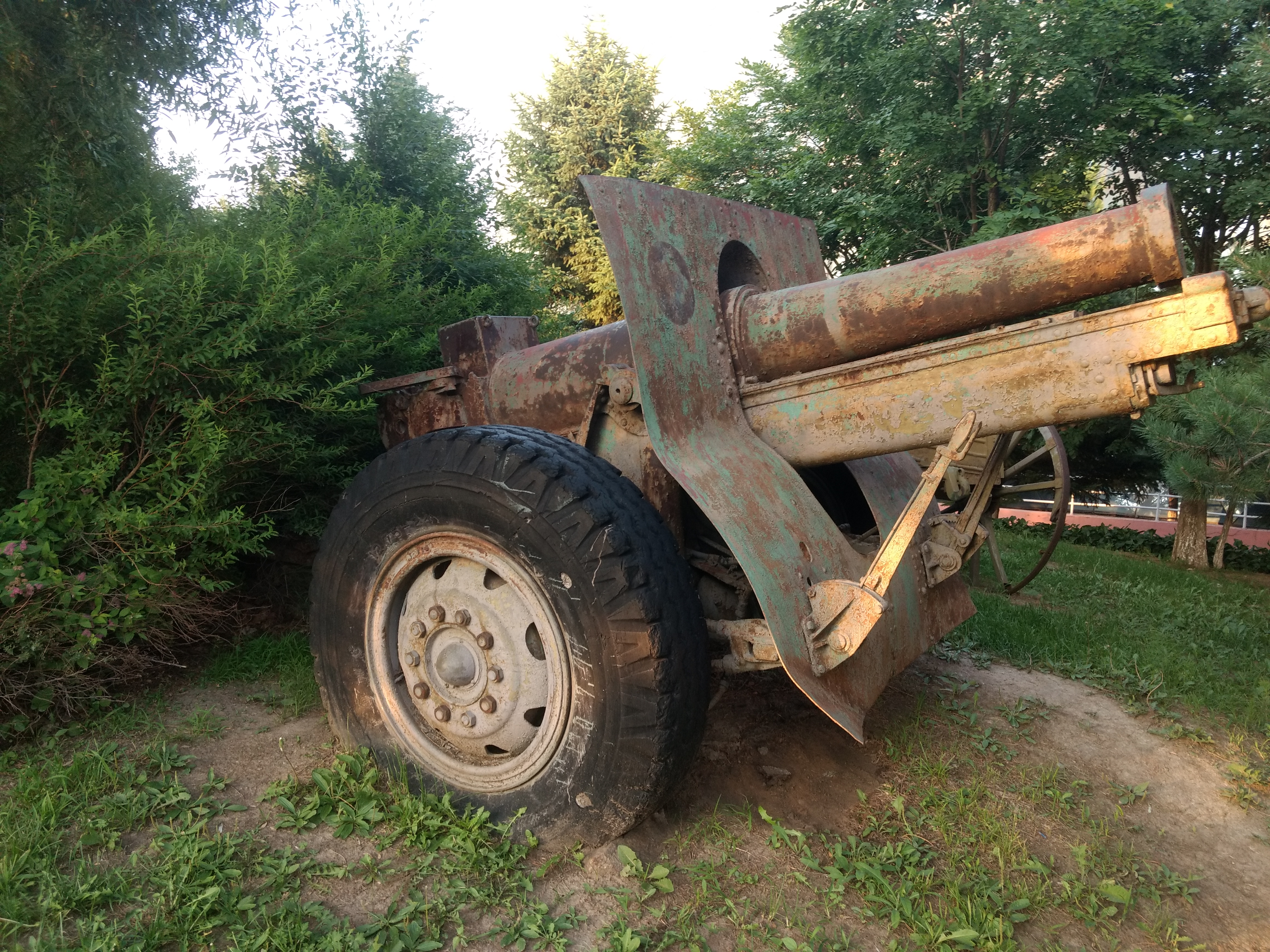
A former Chinese army howitzer

During World War II, the Chinese army received twelve 155mm howitzers from America. After the war, they were captured by the Communists and were used by the People's Liberation Army.

=== Commonwealth ===
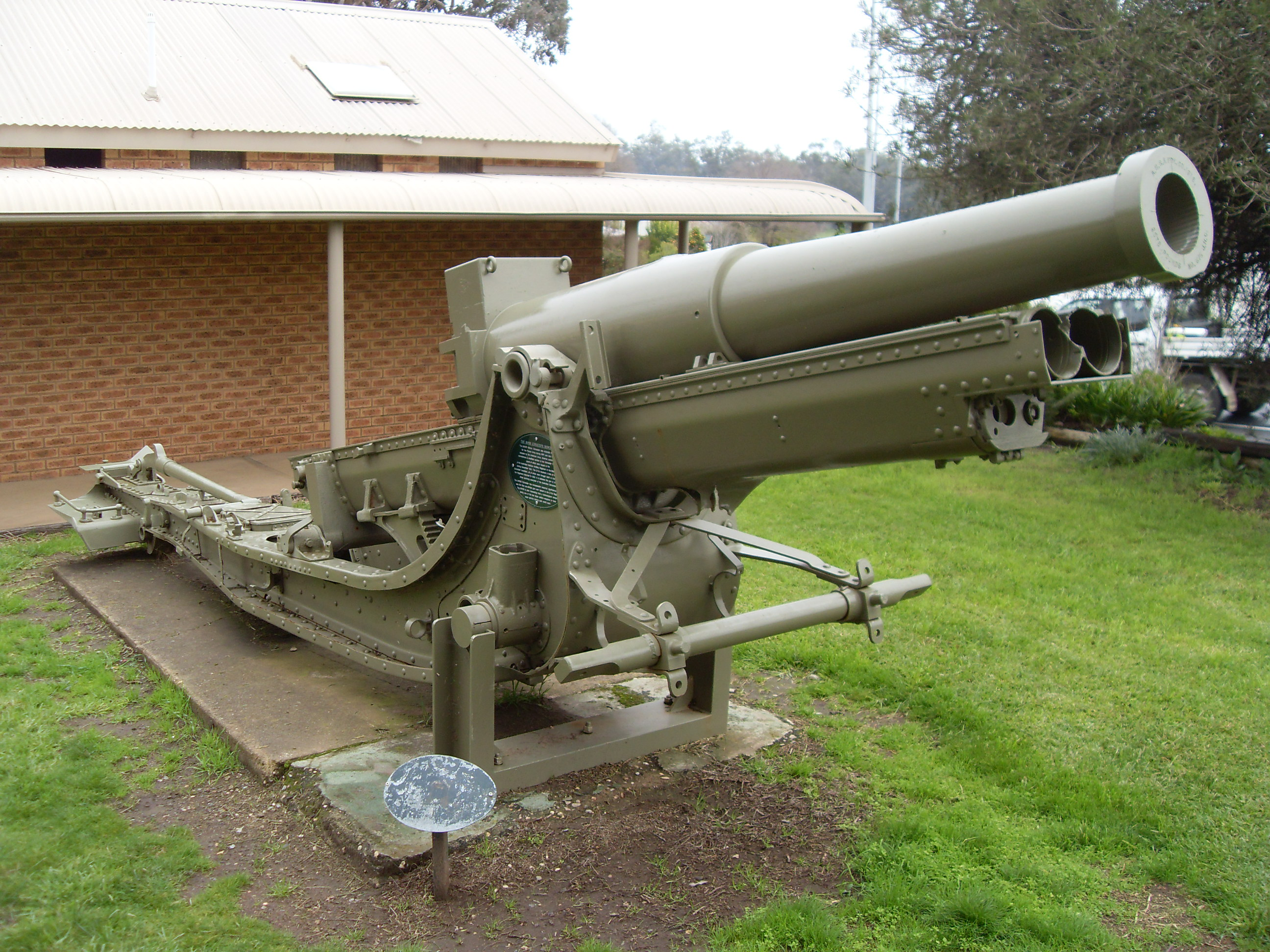
No 675, mounted at Tarcutta, New South Wales

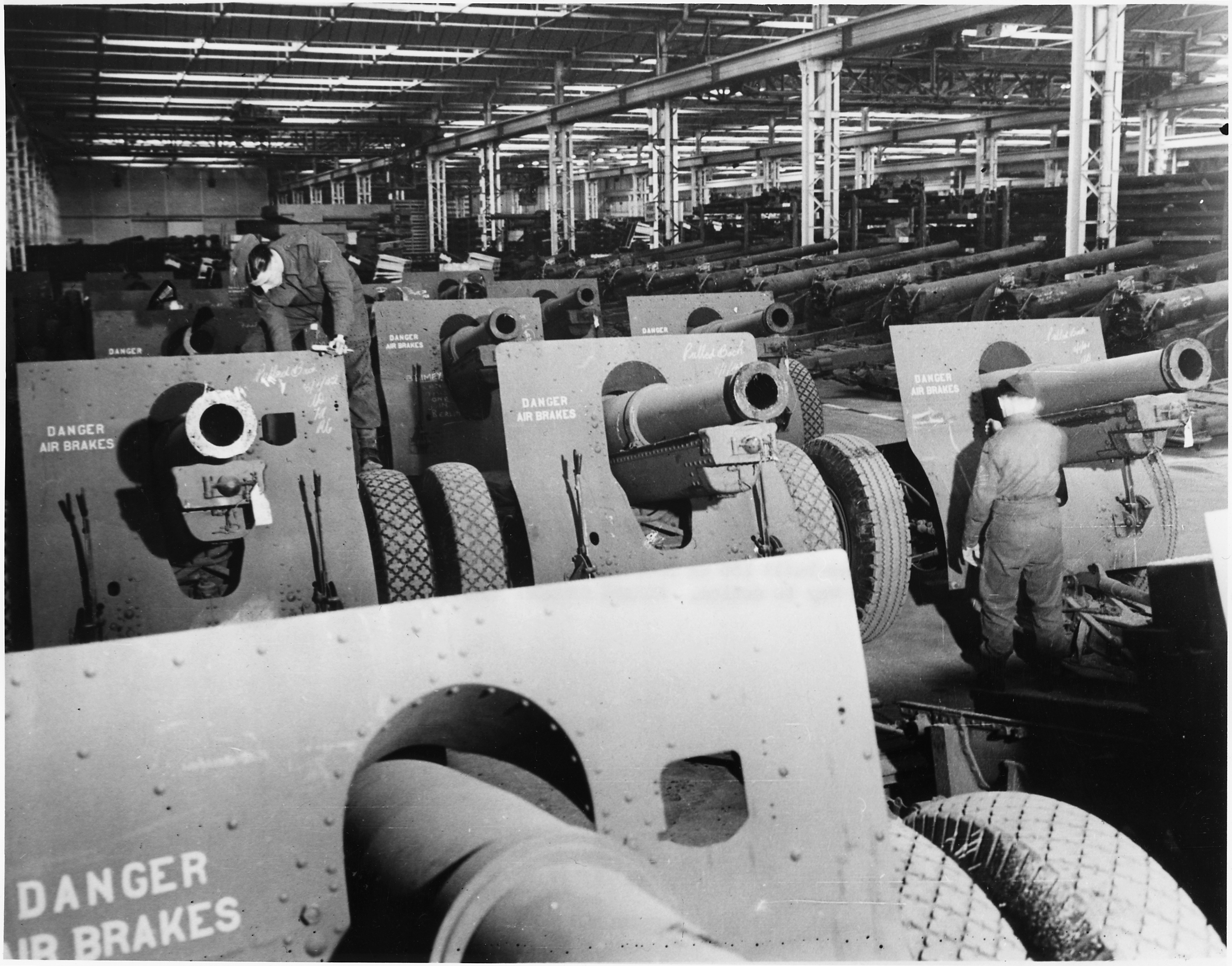
US-built and modernized M1918 155 mm howitzers supplied under Lend-Lease at an ordnance depot in England, 1941.

==== Australia ====
Eighteen American guns were issued to the 2/1st Field Regiment, Royal Australian Artillery in the Middle East during December 1941. All were brought back to Australia when the regiment returned in 1942. Three guns are believed to be in various displays and memorials.

==== United Kingdom ====
About one hundred modernized M1918 howitzers were supplied to the United Kingdom under the Lend-Lease program. They began to arrive in the North African theater at the end of 1941 and equipped medium regiments of the Royal Artillery serving in the Eighth Army.

=== Finland ===
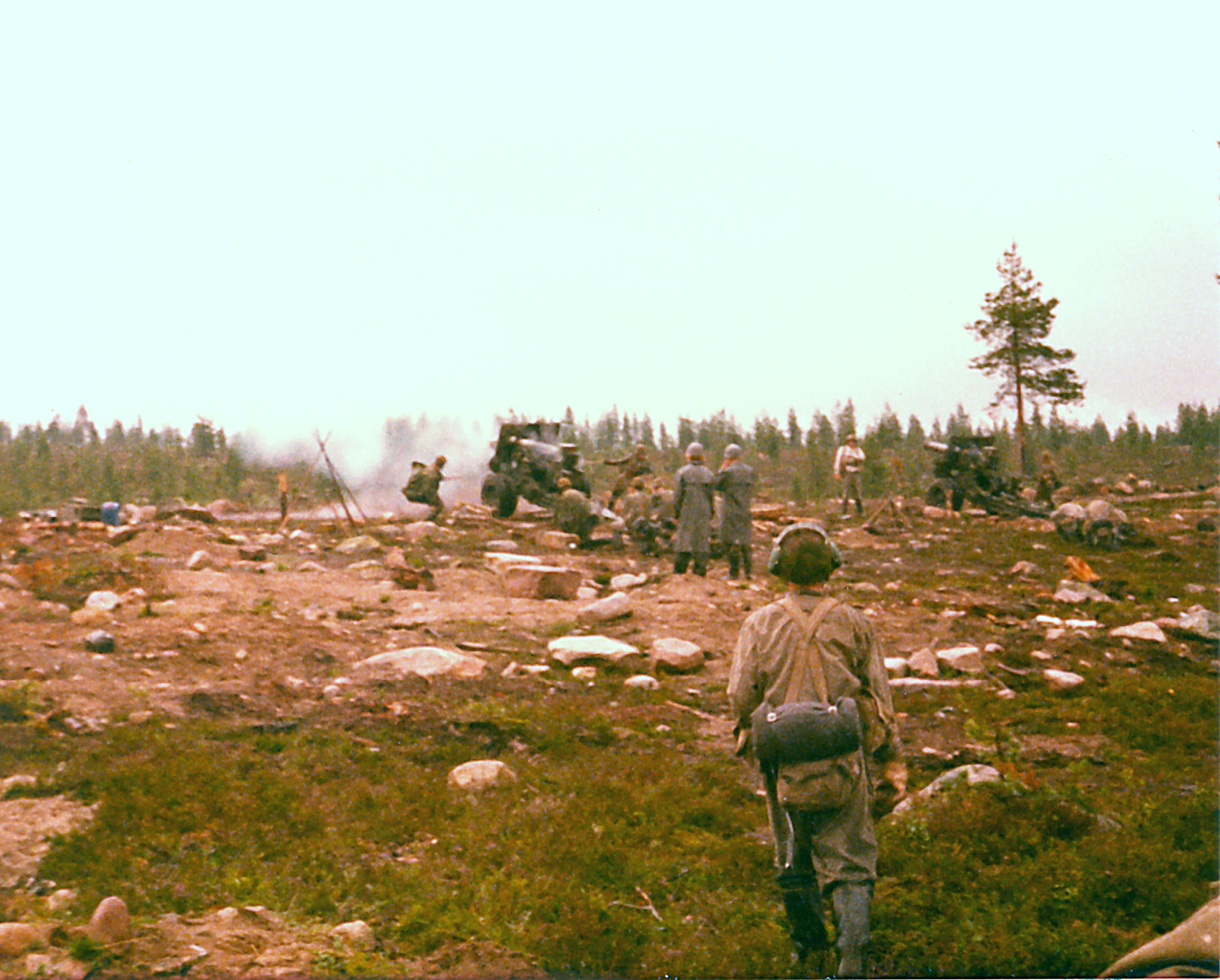
Finnish howitzers being used in a firing exercise, 1981

Schneider sold four C15S and eight C17S howitzers to Finland during the 1920s, known in Finland as the 152 H/15 and 152 H/17. These were rebarreled in Finland's standard 152 mm although they retained their original breeches, which meant that the H/15 used Russian-style cartridge cases and the H/17 used bagged powder. The H/15 had steel-rimmed wooden wheels that were suitable only for horse-traction, but these were later replaced by wheels with sponge rubber tires more suitable for motor traction. They were used for training during peacetime. During the Winter War the H/15s served with the 3rd Separate Heavy Artillery Battery while the H/17s were assigned to Heavy Artillery Battalion 3. During the Continuation War they saw combat with Heavy Artillery Battalions 24 and 25 as well as Field Artillery Regiment 3. They were retired after the end of World War II.

Germany sold a total of 166 captured C17S howitzers to Finland, which was known as the 155 H/17. The first batch of fifteen arriving in October 1940 and 147 arriving over the course of 1941. The last four arrived in 1944. They were heavily used during the Continuation War, serving with the heavy artillery battery 1 and four other such battery's and eight field artillery battalions. Only fourteen were lost to the Soviets in 1944. The remaining howitzers were used for live-fire training and warehoused for future use. New twin pneumatic wheels were fitted during the 1960s, and the guns were retained through the 1980s for live-fire training.

=== France ===
During World War I it became the standard heavy howitzer of the French Army during the later stages of the war. 1,943 were still in service with France in 1939. The Germans designated guns that fell into their hands as the 15.5 cm sFH 414(f).

=== Germany ===
Exactly how many howitzers were captured by Germany in the early years of World War II is not known, but Germany sold 166 howitzers to Finland, reinforced the Atlantic Wall with one hundred, and equipped second-line infantry and static divisions based in France such as the 331st, 709th, 711th, and the 716th. Some howitzers were also used in North Africa by the Deutsches Afrika Korps.

=== Greece ===
Greece had a total of ninety-six howitzers when the Greco-Italian War began in October 1940. They were assigned to the corps-level heavy artillery battalions. Italy seized them after Greece surrendered in May 1941.

=== Italy ===
Italy captured eight during the Battle of France and ninety-six from Greece during the Balkan Campaign and placed them into service as the Obice da 155/14 PB. Howitzers seized by Germany after Italy's surrender in 1943 were placed into service as the 15.5 cm s.FH. 414(i).

=== Lithuania ===
The Lithuanian army was equipped with 155mm Schneider howitzers during the first half of the twentieth century.

=== Philippines ===
At the time of the American entry into World War II resulting from Japanese attacks in December 1941, the Philippines was an American colony and its military was armed by the US. The colonial army's heavy field artillery unit, the 301st FA Regiment which fought in Bataan, was equipped with GPFs and two 155 mm howitzers. These American-made French-designed artillery pieces arrived in the Philippines on 14 October 1941, along with fifty halftracks fitted with 75 mm guns. One howitzer survived the war and is on permanent static display at the Philippine Military Academy. It is fitted with a modified straight shield and a non-standard barrel, which resembles the tube of a Japanese Type 91 10 cm Howitzer. It appears to have a barrel sleeve.

=== Poland ===
C17S howitzers were used by the Polish allied Blue Army in France, which returned to Poland after the end of World War I. Poland acquired a number of howitzers from France then, and it became Polish main heavy howitzer during the Polish–Soviet War 1919–1921. They designated it as the 155 mm haubica wz. 1917 (howitzer 1917 pattern). In October 1920 there were 206 of them. Other orders followed, and Poland bought a license as well. Some forty-four were manufactured in late 1930s in Zakłady Starachowickie in Starachowice. 340 were in service in September 1939 when the Germans invaded. It was the only heavy howitzer in Polish Army in 1939. Each of thirty Polish active infantry divisions had a horse-drawn heavy artillery detachment with three 155 mm howitzers and three 105 mm guns (they were absent in reserve divisions). There were also twelve heavy artillery detachments of C-in-C reserve, each with twelve howitzers in three four-gun batteries. The rest were in reserve. Captured Polish howitzers were taken into German service as the 15.5 cm s.FH. 17(p). None were used in Poland after the war.

=== Portugal ===
Portugal acquired a battery of four pieces in the World War I integrated in the Portuguese Expeditionary Corps. They were retired in 1945.

=== Romania ===
Twelve were received in 1917 and an unknown number, which were captured in World War II, were received from Germany. They equipped a heavy artillery motorized regiment.

=== Imperial Russia/USSR ===
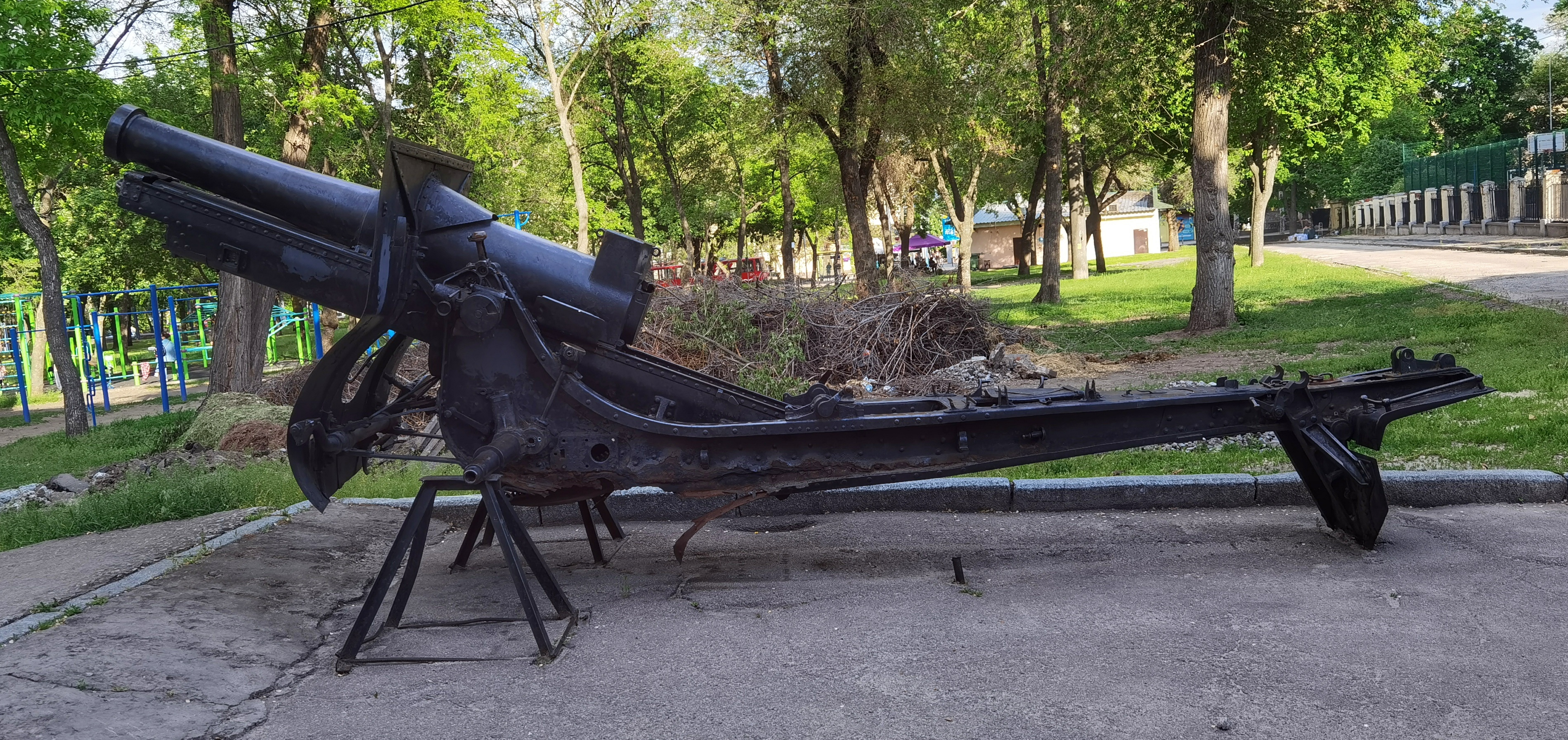
A howitzer In Dnipro, Ukraine.

Some were sold to Russia during World War I, but nothing is known of their numbers or use. Apparently the Soviets rebarreled surviving howitzers to use their standard 152 mm cased ammunition, the Germans gave them the designation 15.2 cm sFH 449(r), but none seemed to be on hand on 22 June 1941 at the start of Operation Barbarossa. According to some sources, the Soviets also captured 111 Polish 155 mm howitzers during the Soviet invasion of Poland in September 1939.

=== Spain ===
The first guns were procured in France in 1917, the weapon being declared standard for Army use in November 1922, although their first military use was in Africa in 1921 during the assault at Turiet Hamed. The gun was also built under license at Trubia and was used by the Regimientos de Artillería Pesados (Heavy Artillery Regiments). One was captured by revolutionaries in the Trubia factory during the Asturian miners' strike of 1934, although it was ineffective due to the lack of fuzing for their shells; the gun was damaged when a dynamite cartridge bundle used as substitute for fuzeless shells exploded inside. The gun was heavily used during the Spanish Civil War by both sides. During the SCW and World War II some guns were used as coastal defence weapons to improve Spanish coastal defences as nothing more suitable was available. It remained in service until the 1950s when they were replaced by more modern equipment. There are many surviving pieces, of Spanish and French construction, in museums and as monuments around Spain.

=== United States ===
==== World War I ====
Newsreel footage of a US battery in action in France, 1918

Prior to 1917, the United States had used its own M1908 6-inch howitzer. After entry into World War I, it was discarded as unsatisfactory in favor of the French gun, which the US found had withstood the tests of war and had proven in every way to be superior to all other howitzer designs of the same or similar caliber. The general policy of the US Army in World War I was to initially acquire French or British weapons to simplify the supply system and allow their forces to enter combat as soon as possible. Although some foreign designs began to be manufactured in the United States with the intent to add them to the Allied-made weapons, quality problems resulted in few domestically-made weapons reaching France by the time of the Armistice. The United States purchased 1,503 examples of the Mle 1917 from France and adopted it as the 155 mm Howitzer Carriage, Model of 1917 (Schneider), as the standard howitzer for the United States Army. The last American shot fired during the Great War was fired by a Schneider howitzer called "Calamity Jane", of the 11th Field Artillery Regiment, which is preserved in the West Point museum.

The United States also paid $560,000 for non-exclusive rights to the design and working drawings. In addition to the 1,503 examples purchased in France and used there, 626 were manufactured by or for the US in the United States (stated to have been at a cost of more than $10,000,000). Model 1918 howitzers built in the US differed somewhat from French models, with a straight rather than curved shield, rubber rather than steel tyres on wooden spoked wheels, a pivoting spade and a slightly different firing mechanism. US units were in action in France in 1918 with the 1,503 French-built guns. The first US regiment equipped with US-made guns was about to embark for France when World War I ended. The 1,503 weapons purchased from France were brought to the United States in 1919.

==== Interwar period and World War II ====
155 mm howitzers were initially not assigned to infantry divisions in the postwar reorganization of the early 1920s. After the war, a board headed by Brigadier General William I. Westervelt to analyze the Army's field artillery had recommended that 155 mm howitzers, because of their larger size and power and poorer mobility, be moved from infantry divisions to corps and army artillery once a 105 mm howitzer was developed as the standard medium howitzer of the infantry division to replace the 75 mm gun (the replacement of the 75 mm gun was another recommendation of the board).

A lack of funding meant that the program to develop a 105 mm howitzer stalled, and almost no weapons were manufactured; two regiments of horse-drawn 75 mm guns remained the infantry division's artillery until the late 1920s. Beginning in 1929, a number of 155 mm howitzer regiments were reassigned from corps level to infantry divisions' artilleries to augment their firepower for lack of a 105 mm howitzer. As part of the Army Field Artillery branch's motorization program of the early 1930s, it was planned to modernize 75 percent of divisional artillery pieces as funds became available, switching 75 mm guns from horse traction to high-speed motor traction, and 155 mm howitzers from low to high-speed motor traction. The M1918M1 carriage that had air brakes, new metal wheels, and pneumatic rubber tires for high-speed motor traction was developed beginning in 1934 and was standardized in 1936. 599 of 2,971 M1917 and M1918 howitzers in the U.S. inventory had been converted by 1940.

The M1917 and M1918 howitzers remained the standard American heavy howitzers until superseded by the 155 mm howitzer M1 beginning in late 1942. They saw limited use with both U.S. Army and Marine artillery units in the early part of the war while shortages of the 155 mm howitzer M1 were resolved.

=== Yugoslavia ===
Thirty-six C17S's were in Yugoslav service by the 1920s although it is unclear whether these were weapons furnished to Serbia during World War I or bought by Yugoslavia during the 1920s. The Germans designated guns that fell into their hands as the 15.5cm H 427(j).

== Operators ==
- Argentina
- Australia
- Belgium
- Bolivia
- Republic of China
- China
- Finland
- France
- Vichy France
- Nazi Germany
- Greece
- Italy
- Lithuania
- Philippines
- Poland
- Portugal
- Romania
- Russia
- Soviet Union
- Spain
- United Kingdom
- United States
- Yugoslavia

== Gallery ==
Canon de 155 C modèle 1915 Schneider

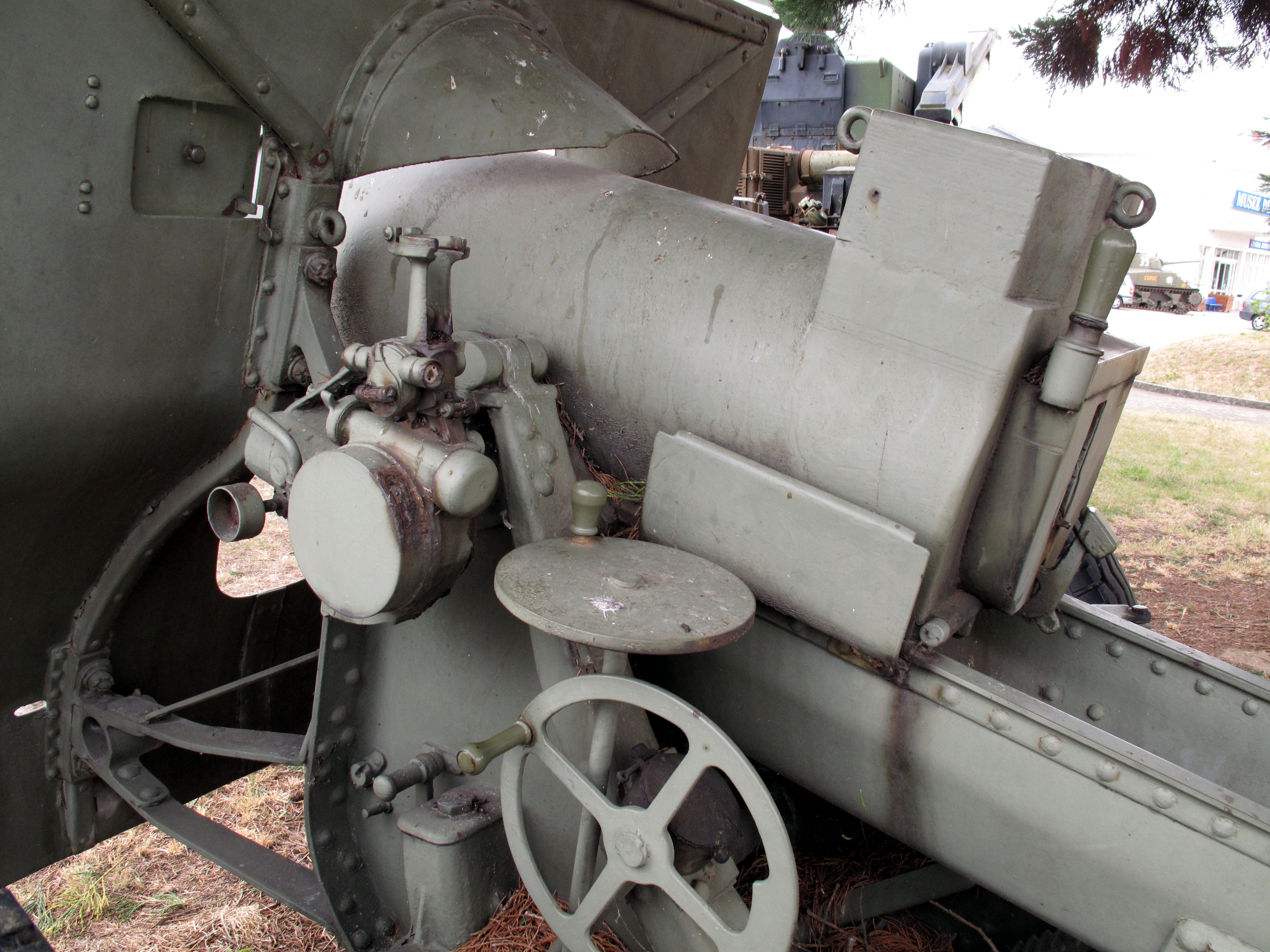

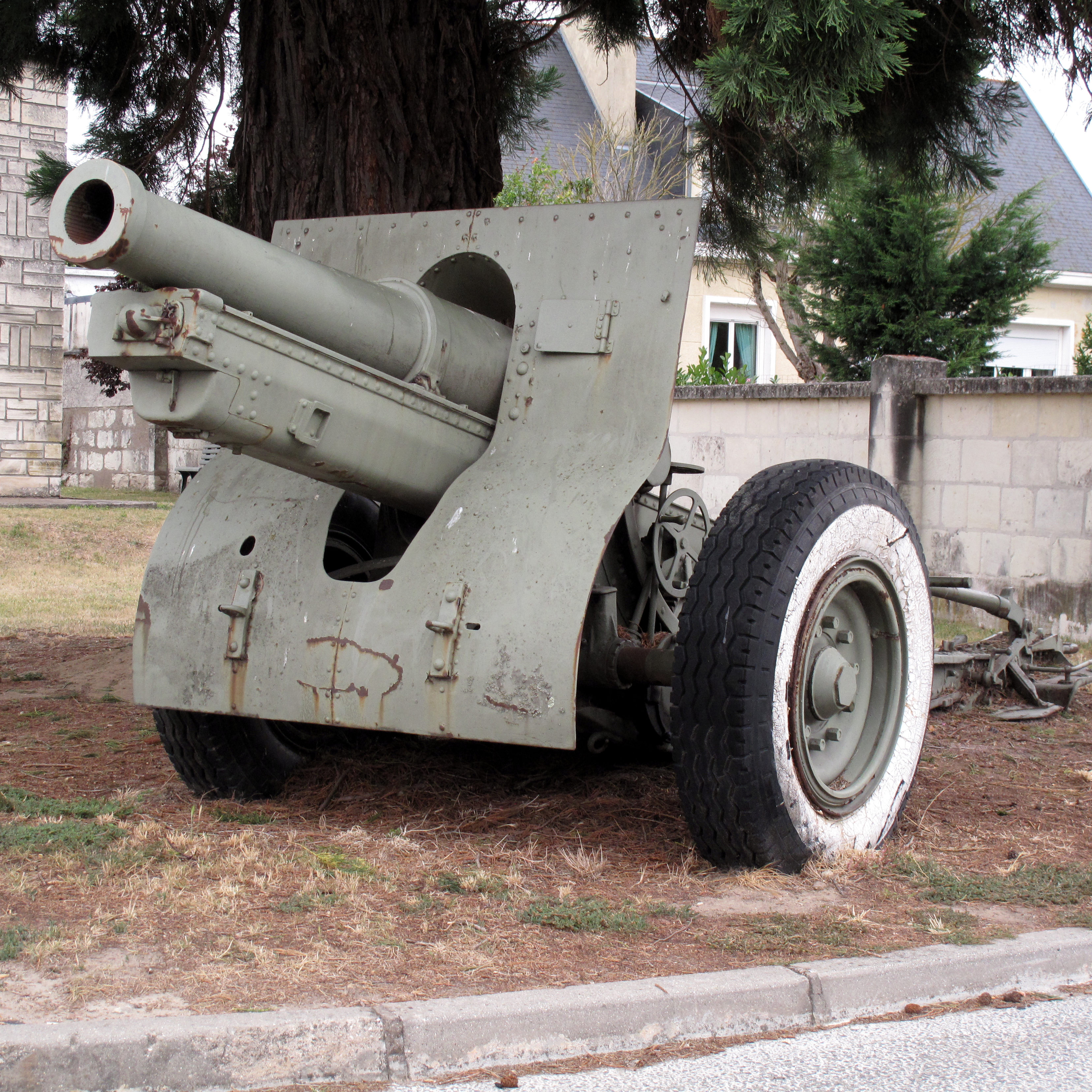

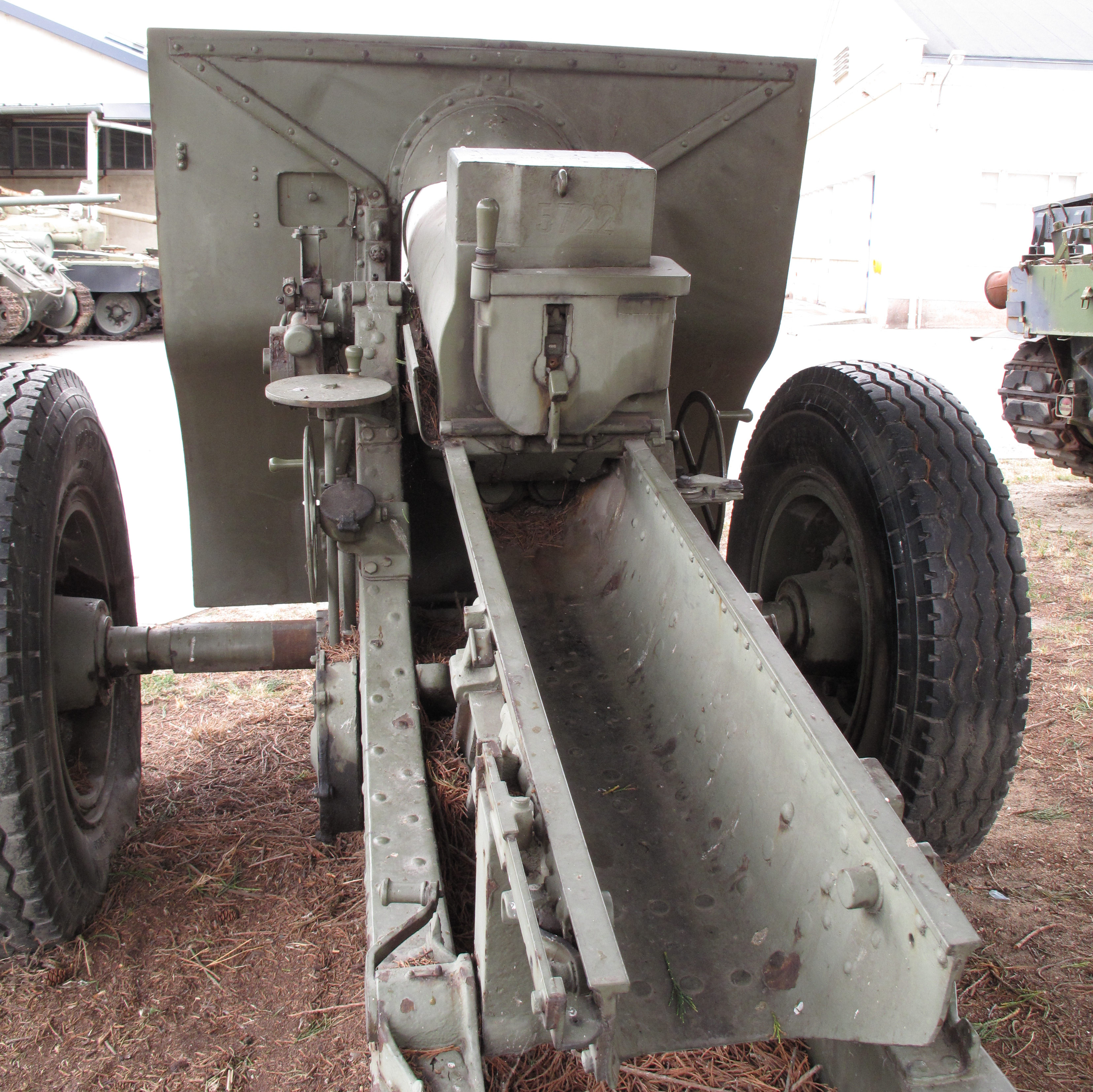

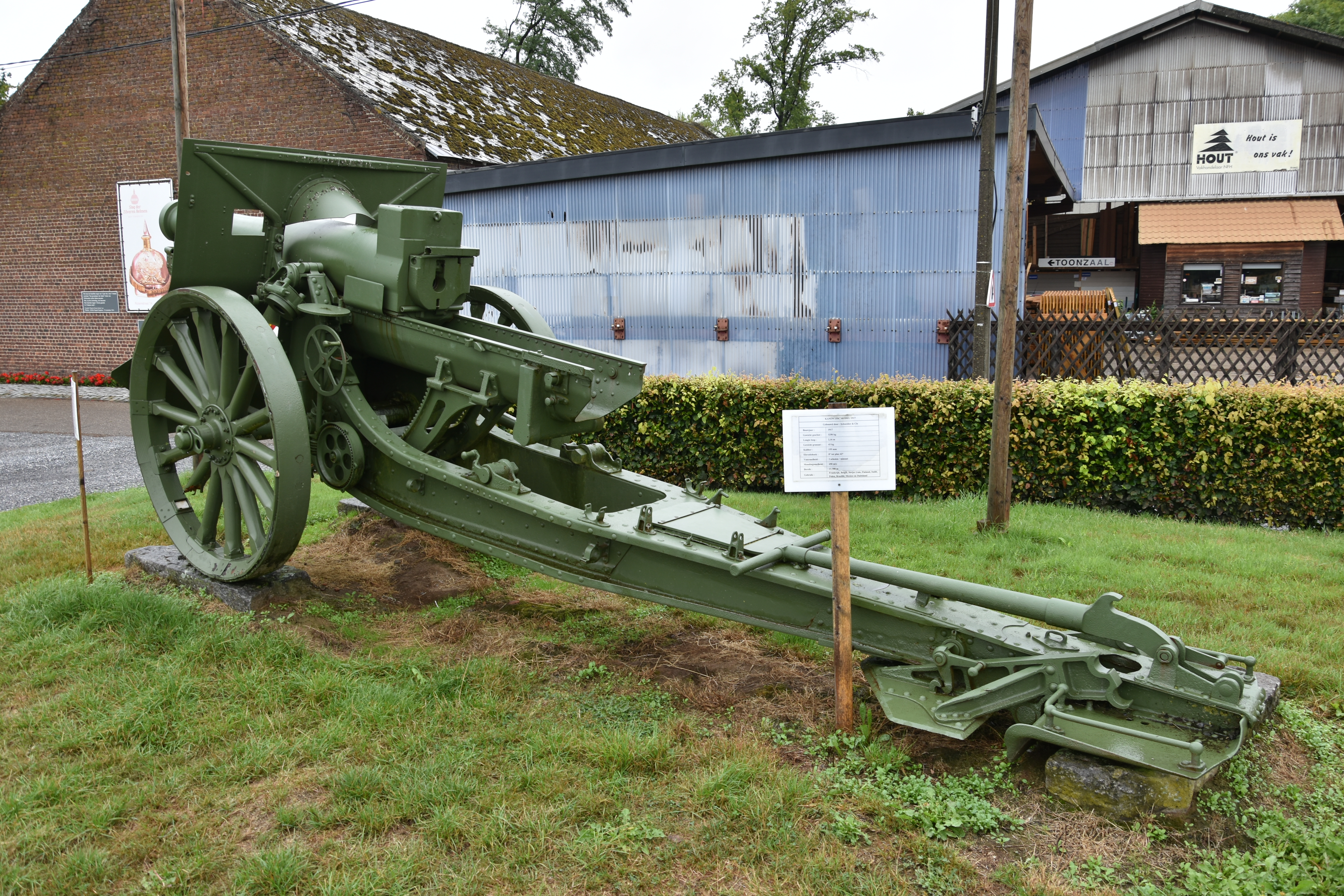

US Army M1917/M1918

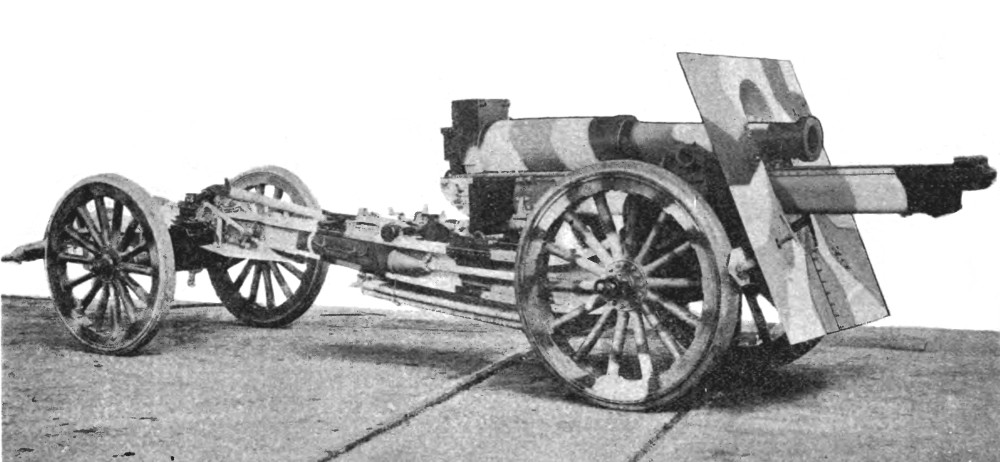
US Model 1918 attached to limber with barrel pulled back in traveling position

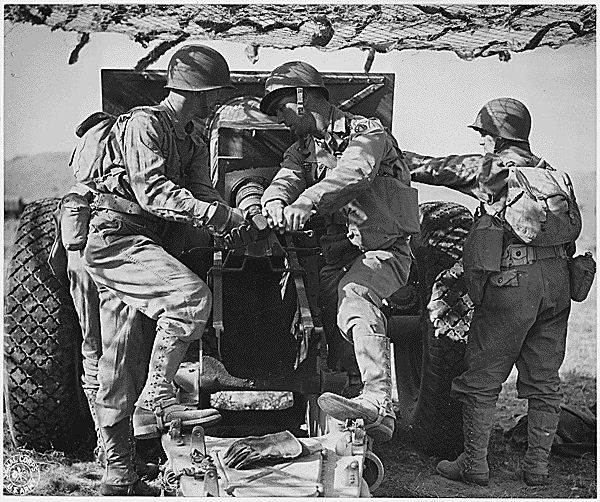
Live-fire training

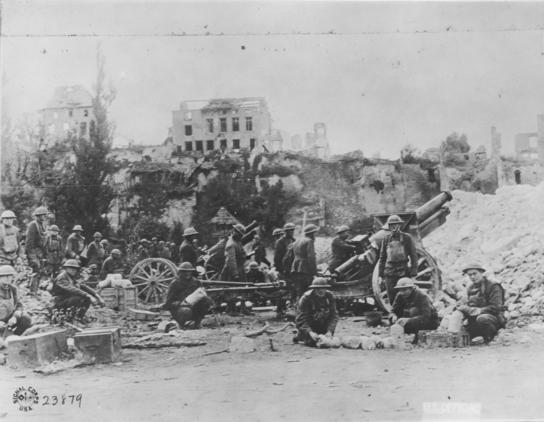
An American battery position near Varennes in 1918.

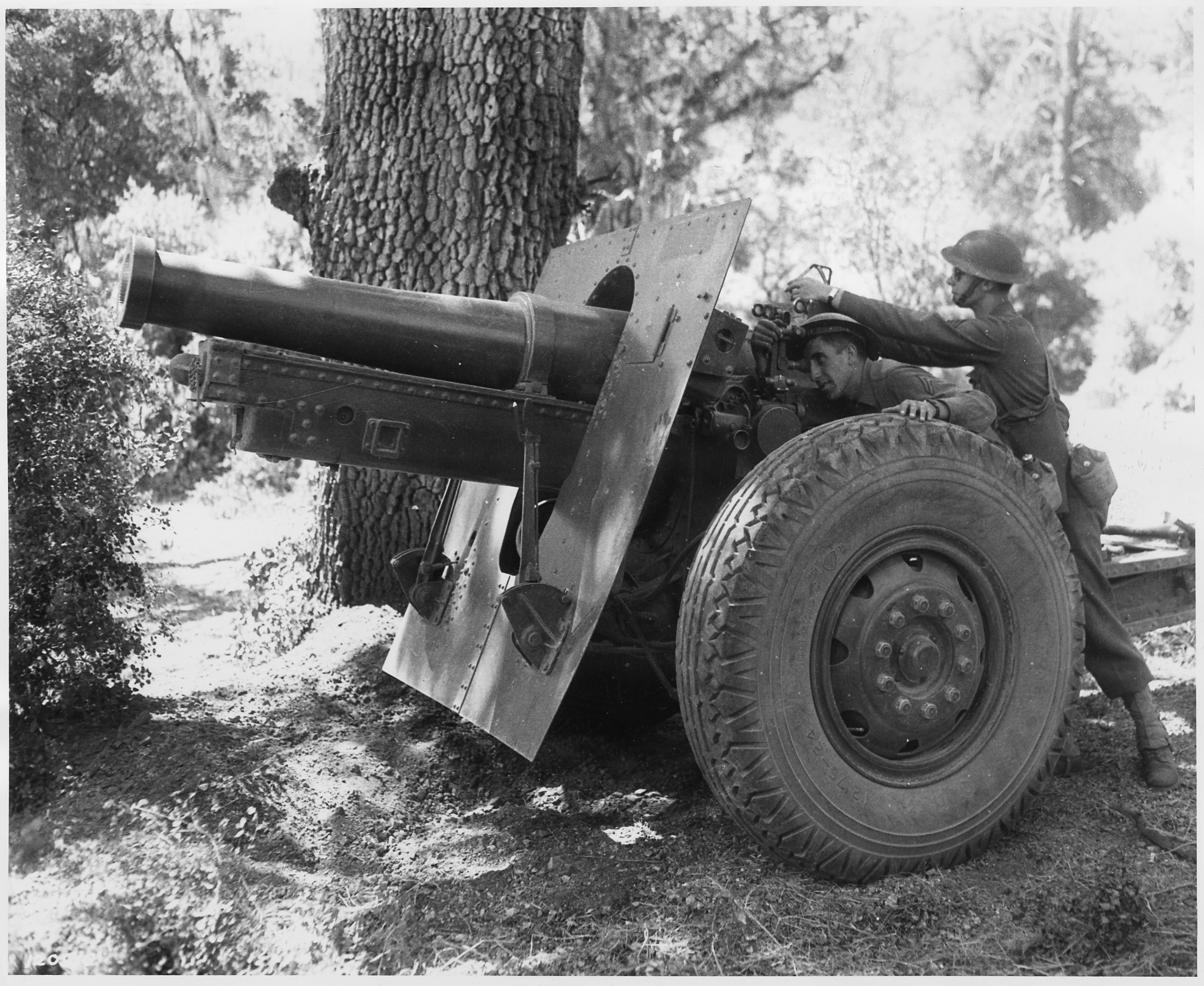
US Army example

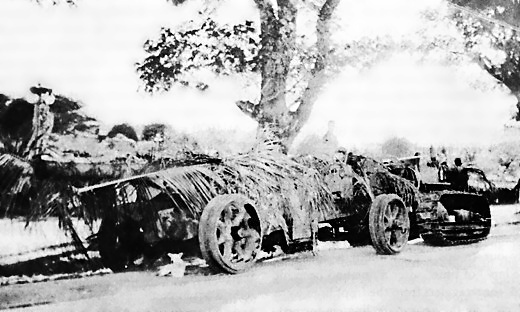
Philippines, 1941

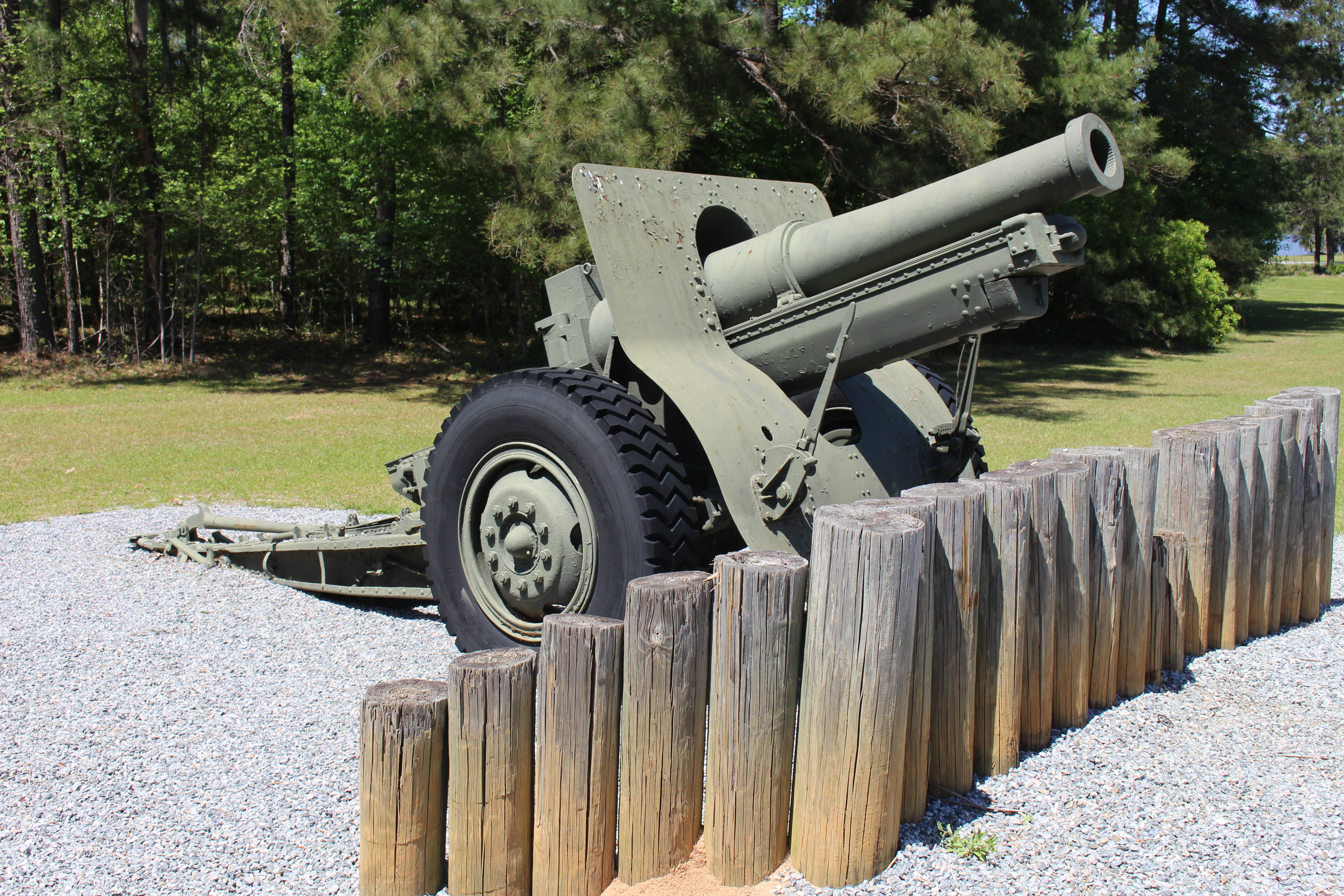
US Model 1918 on display at Georgia Veterans Memorial State Park

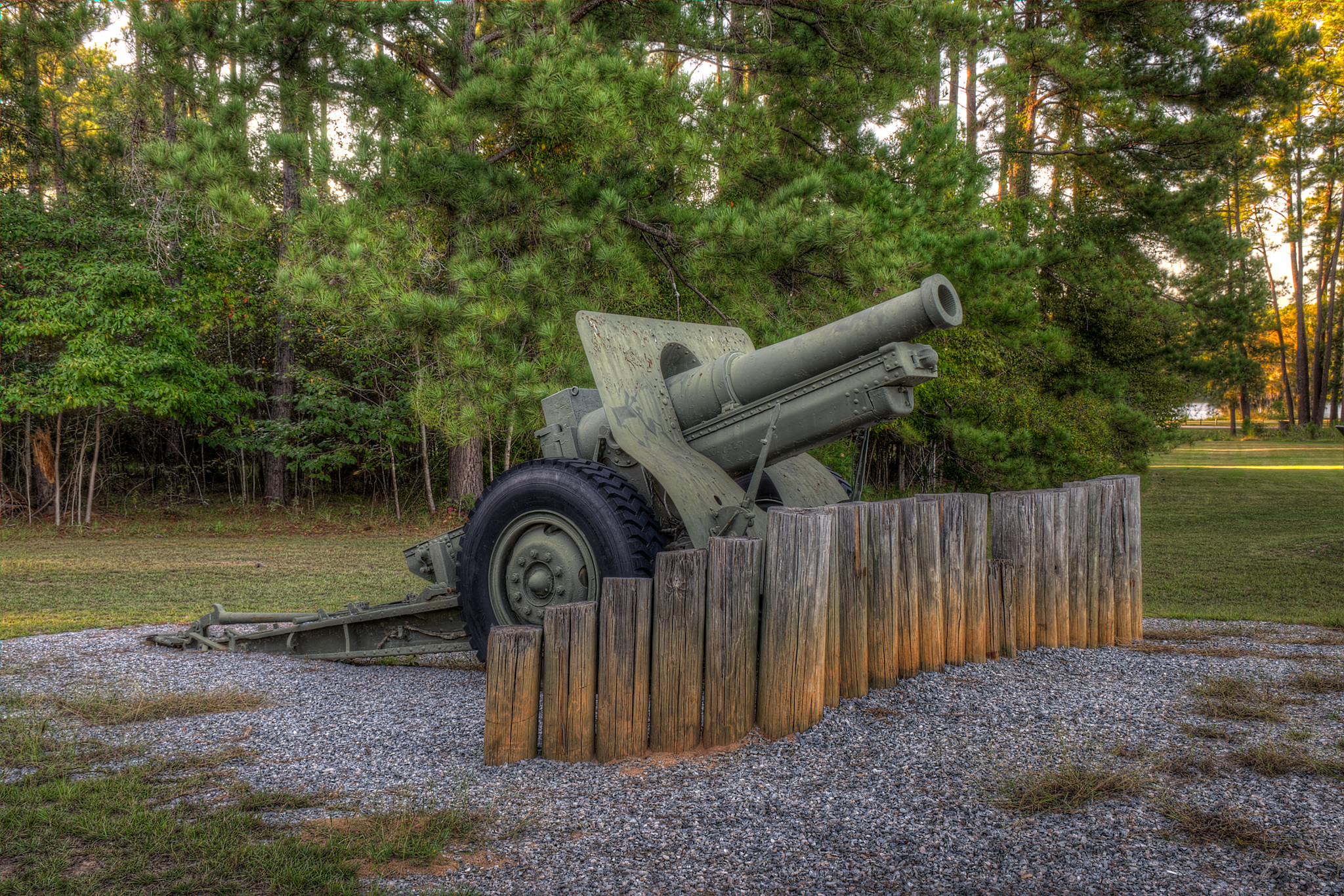
Different view of the US Model 1918 on display at Georgia Veterans Memorial State Park

Other users

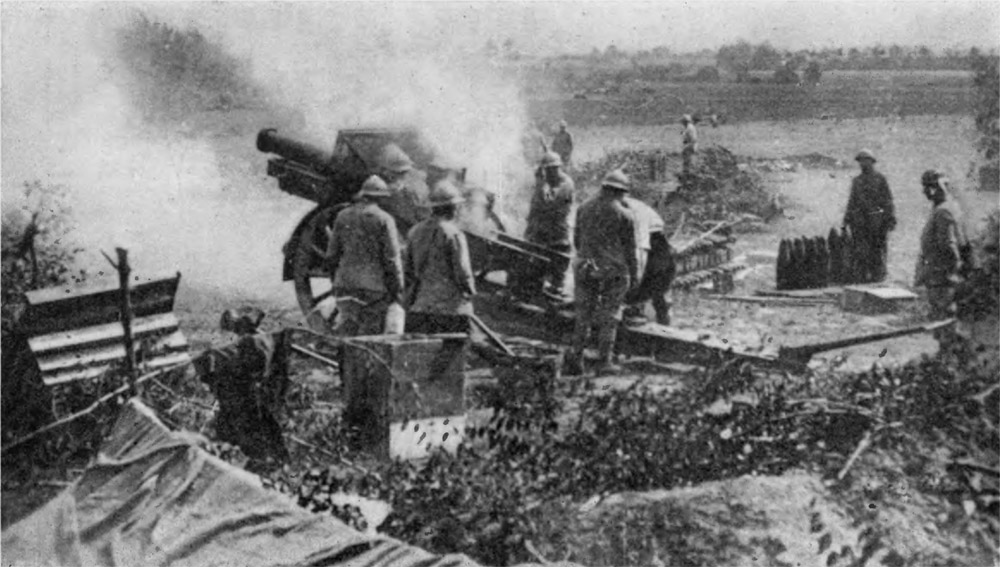
French gunners firing, circa 1918

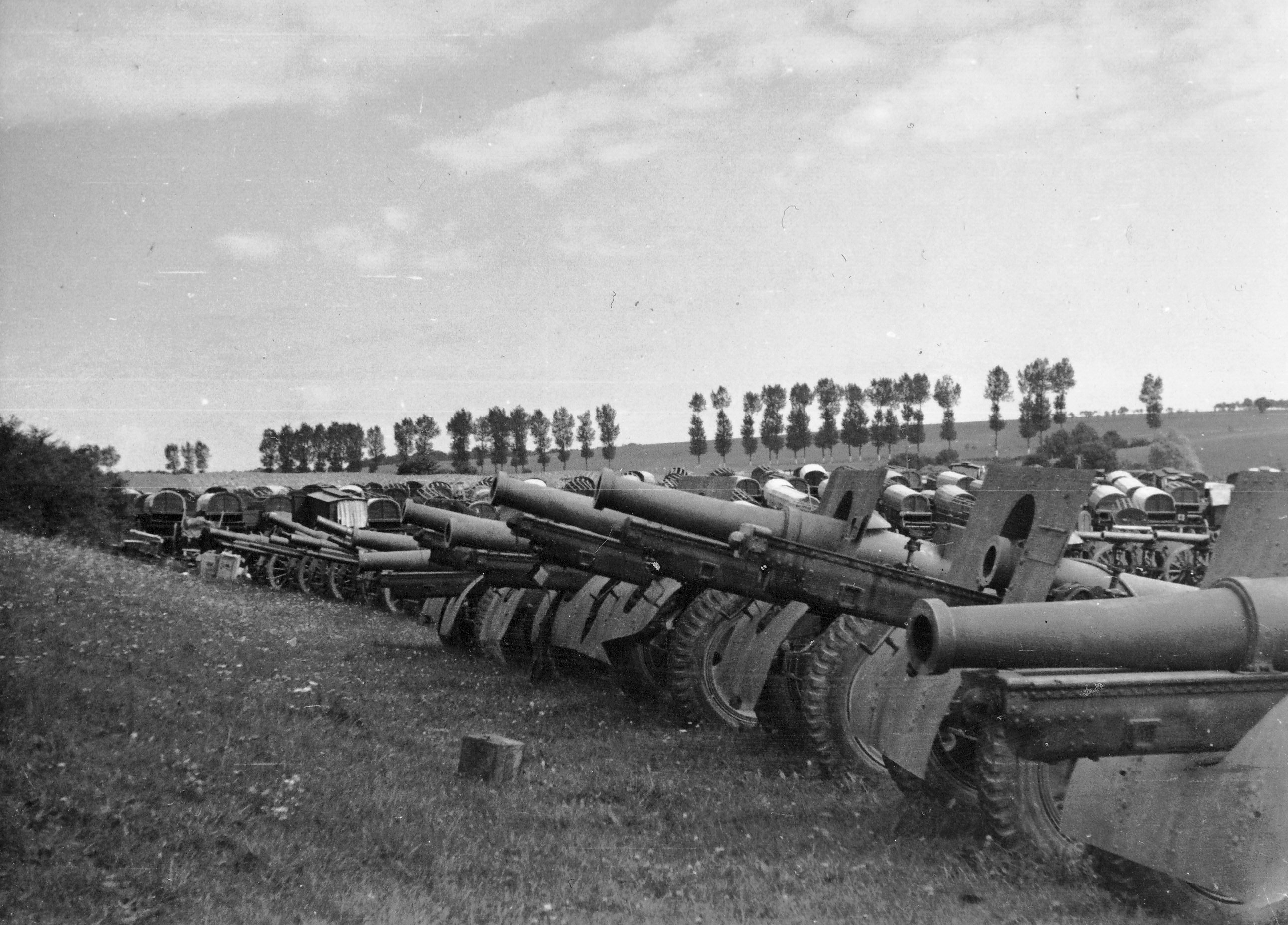
Captured by Germans during Operation Barbarossa.

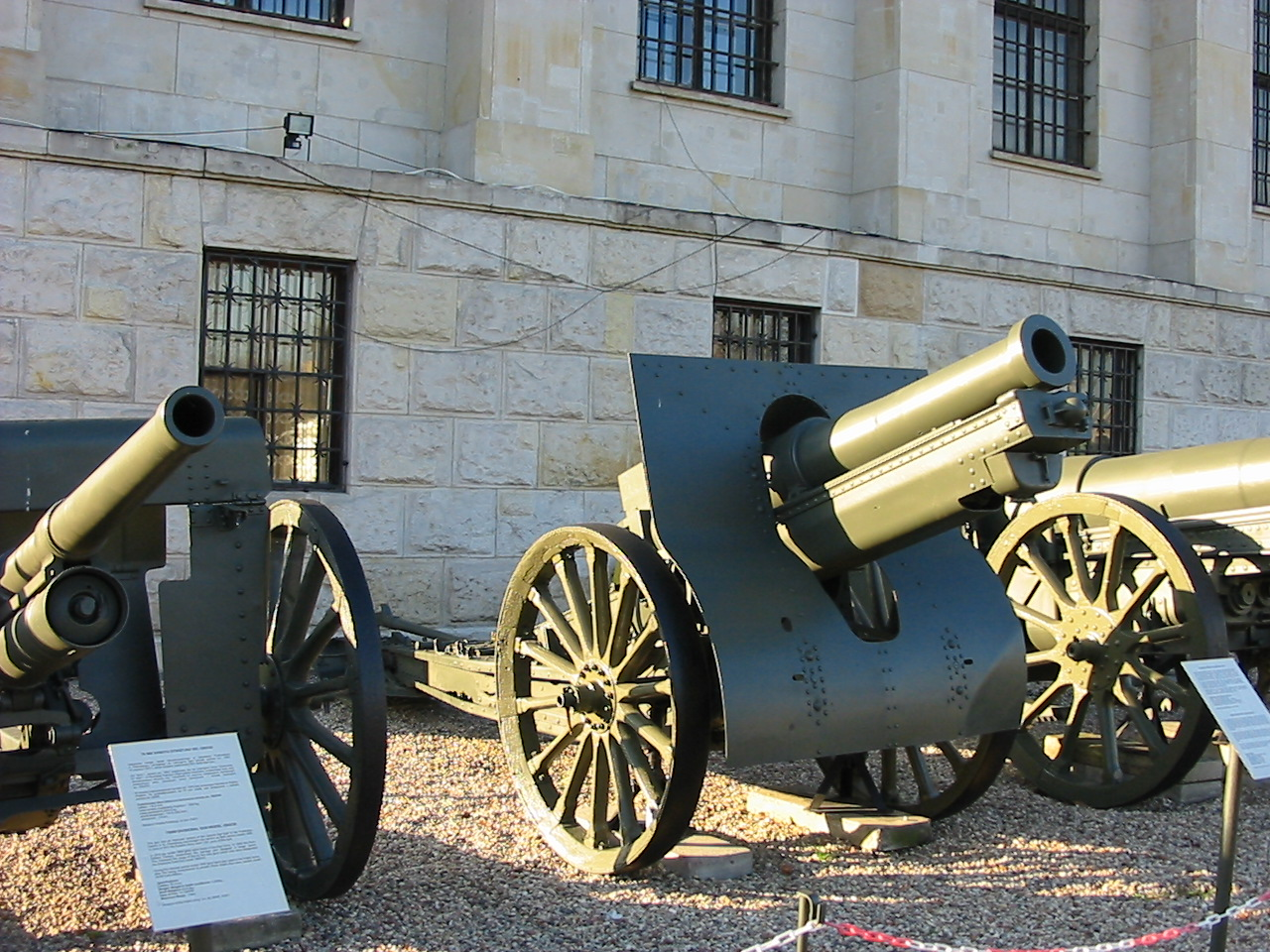
C17S on the foreign artillery display in the Polish Army Museum, Warsaw

== See also ==
- United States home front during World War I

=== Weapons of comparable role, performance and era ===
- 6 inch 26 cwt howitzer British equivalent
- 15 cm sFH 13 German equivalent
