= CMFR =

CMFR means:

- Completely Mixed Flow Reactor
- Center for Media Freedom and Responsibility
