= Alliance of Independent Journalists =

Indonesian journalists' association

The Alliance of Independent Journalists (Indonesian: Aliansi Jurnalis Independen, abbreviated as AJI) is an Indonesian organization that promotes press freedom in the country.

The AJI was founded in 1994 by Satrio Arismunandar, Ahmad Taufik, Goenawan Mohamad, the founder and editor of Tempo magazine, and Ging Ginanjar in response to the banning by the Suharto government of three magazines: Tempo, Editor, and Detik. The organisation is a member of International Federation of Journalists (IFJ) and of the Southeast Asian Press Alliance (SEAPA). AJI is also a member organization of the Asian Forum for Human Rights and Development (FORUM-ASIA) and the Global Investigative Journalism Network.

Based in Jakarta, Indonesia, AJI is the first independent journalists' association in the country.

== See also ==
- International Federation of Journalists
- Southeast Asian Press Alliance
- Asian Forum for Human Rights and Development
- Global Investigative Journalism Network
