= Satrio Arismunandar =

Indonesian activist and journalist

Satrio Arismunandar (born 1961) was a student movement activist from Indonesia. He founded the Alliance of Independent Journalists (AJI) in 1994, as an organization that opposed the Suharto regime and has since become Indonesia's leading body for journalists. Its involvement in the labor movement led to him being forced to step down from the daily newspaper Kompas in 1995.

== Education and student activities ==
He was born in Semarang, on 11 April 1961 as the first child of six children in the Wiharto Arismunandar family. He graduated from 14th National Middle School in East Jakarta in 1980, and graduated with a major in electronics from the University of Indonesia (UI) in 1989. His father, a middle officer in the Indonesian airforce, died from a disease just ten days before Satrio graduated from UI. Satrio's activities as a student were varied. He was a member of the Democratic Student Body, a head of the Electronics Students Association, member of the nature lover association, editing the campus newspaper and active in the local mosque. He also participated in receiving new members for the Muslim Students' Association in 1981 and became a member of the ISAFIS (The Indonesian Student Association for International Studies), although in the end he decided to concentrate on journalism related activities on campus.

After working from 1986 to 1995 as a journalist, he went back to do a Master's degree in Defence Studies at the University of Indonesia, and graduated in August, 2000. His thesis was on The role of student journalism in the student movement in 1998: A case study of the bulletin Move! at the time of stopping president Suharto, which became the material for a book.

== Journalistic experience ==
Since he was a student, Satrio had already worked as a freelance writer (1981–1986), journalist for the daily Harian Pelita (1986–1988), the daily Kompas (1988–1995), and the magazine D&R (1997–2000). As a journalist in Kompas, he became a specialist on the politics of the Middle East and international conflict, after reporting from the Gulf War in Iraq and the conflict in Bosnia and Herzegovina.

He now works in television.
