= Ging Ginanjar =

Indonesian journalist (died 2019)

This is an Indonesian name, and the person should be referred by the given name, Ging.

Ging Ginanjar (died 20 January 2019) was an Indonesian journalist instrumental in securing freedom of the press during the transition to Post-Suharto Indonesia.

Ging started his career in journalism at the tabloid Detik (which was banned by the Suharto regime in 1994 and reborn later as detik.com) in the early 1990s. In late 1994 he co-founded the Alliance of Independent Journalists.

He was jailed after participating in demonstrations in 1998.

After the fall of Suharto, Ging worked at KBR, an independent news agency formed in the wake of the transition, and then at Deutsche Welle, and eventually at BBC, where he worked until his death in January 2019.

He died in January 2019 at the age of 55.
