= Southeast Asian Press Alliance =

The Southeast Asian Press Alliance (SEAPA) is the only regional organization focused on promoting and protecting press freedom and freedom of expression in Southeast Asia. Established as a non-profit organization in November 1998, the alliance works to unite independent journalists and press-related organizations in the region into a force for free expression advocacy and mutual protection.

SEAPA's board of trustees is composed of representatives from the alliance's Founding Members, including:

- Thai Journalists Association
- Institute for Studies on Free Flow of Information (Indonesia)
- Alliance of Independent Journalists (Indonesia)
- Center for Media Freedom and Responsibility (Philippines)
- Philippine Center for Investigative Journalism

SEAPA is registered in Manila as a regional non-governmental organization. It has offices in Manila and houses its main secretariat in Bangkok.

SEAPA is an associate member of the International Freedom of Expression Exchange (IFEX), a global network of non-governmental organisations that work to promote and defend the right to free expression.

== Members ==
The following are SEAPA's member organizations:

=== Cambodia ===
- Cambodian Center for Human Rights (CCHR)
- Cambodian Center for Independent Media (CCIM)

=== Indonesia ===
- Aliansi Jurnalis Independen (Alliance of Independent Journalists, AJI-Indonesia)
- Institut Studi Arus Informasi (Institute for Studies on the Free Flow of Information, ISAI, Indonesia)
- Forum Jurnalis Perempuan – Indonesia (Forum of Women Journalists in Indonesia, FJP Indonesia) – associate member

=== Malaysia ===
- Centre for Independent Journalism (CIJ, Malaysia)

=== Myanmar ===
- Burma News InternationalBNI-wide (BNI) – associate member
- Myanmar Journalist Network (MJN) – associate member

=== Philippines ===
- Center for Media Freedom and Responsibility (CMFR, Philippines)
- Philippine Center for Investigative Journalism (PCIJ)
- National Union of Journalists in the Philippines – associate member

=== Thailand ===
- Thai Journalists Association (TJA)

=== Timor Leste (Timor Lorosae) ===
- Asosiasaun Jornalista Timor Lorosa’e (Timor Leste Journalist Association, AJTL)

== See also ==
- International Freedom of Expression Exchange
