= Center for Media Freedom and Responsibility =

Non-profit foundation in the Philippines

- CMFR logo
- Formation: 1989
- Dissolved: September 30, 2026; 33 days ago
- Type: Nonprofit organisation, non-governmental organisation
- Headquarters: Quezon City, Philippines
- Executive Director: Melinda Quintos de Jesus
- Chairperson: Tina Monzon-Palma
- Treasurer: Lisa O. Periquet
- Corporate Secretary: Lorna Kalaw-Tirol
- Key people: Ed Lingao; Vergel O. Santos; Francis Estrada; Carlos Conde
- Website: cmfr-phil.org

The Center for Media Freedom and Responsibility (CMFR) was a private, non-stock, non-profit foundation in the Philippines that has focused its endeavor on press freedom protection along with the establishment of a framework of responsibility for its practice. Its programs represent efforts to protect the press as well as to promote professional and ethical values in journalistic practice.

== History ==
The formation of the Center for Media Freedom and Responsibility (CMFR) addresses one of the critical concerns confronting the Philippines after People Power toppled the Marcos dictatorship in February 1986. That concern called attention to the power of the media and the role of the free press in the development of Philippine democracy.

All over the world, press freedom has been found to be essential to the democratic system. Effective participatory government is possible only when it can count on a well-informed society where individuals freely exchange ideas, and public debate and discussion arise from knowledge and understanding of national affairs.

That freedom involves not only media professionals, but also the public served by the media—public officials, the private sector, civil society groups, readers, viewers, and listeners—who receive information and are a part of the cycle of public communication. But freedom of the press, like all liberties, has its limits, for the simplest reason that it is vulnerable to abuse.

Democratic recovery confronts serious obstacles on the media front. The press and the media need to exert special efforts to measure up a collective vehicle of information, and as an instrument for clarifying complex issues and dilemmas of development that the public should understand.

Against this background, CMFR was organized in 1989 as a private, non-stock, non-profit organization involving the different sectors of society in the task of building up the press and news media as a pillar of democratic society. Its programs uphold press freedom, promote responsible journalism, and encourage journalistic excellence.

On January 28, 2008, 30 journalists filed a P10-million media class suit (by the National Union of Journalists of the Philippines, Center for Media Freedom and Responsibility (CMFR), and Philippine Press Institute (PPI). Executive Judge Winlove Dumayas of Makati Regional Trial Court Branch 59 granted the petition for a temporary restraining order, effective for 72 hours.

On September 18, 2026, the organization announced it would cease operations on September 30, 2026, after 37 years of service.

== Objectives ==
- To protect and strengthen the press as a pillar of democracy
- To establish a framework of responsibility and ethics in the practice of the press
- To raise levels of competence for coverage of special areas of news
- To promote journalistic excellence
- To engage different sectors of society in the growth of a quality press in the Philippines
- To promote media literacy and create awareness on the public's need for information

== Program of activities ==
=== Media monitoring ===
With content analysis, CMFR evaluates media coverage of major issues and events, such as elections and corruption. Based on its findings, CMFR has recommended measures to improve media performance.

In addition to special projects based on content analysis, PJR Reports includes case studies of media performance.

==== PJR and PJR Reports ====
The Philippine Journalism Review (PJR), which was previously in magazine form, was revived in 2007 as a refereed journal for students and professors of journalism. PJR Reports is its monthly sister publication addressed to journalism professionals.

PJR Reports is not just a publication; it is the result of a continuing monitoring activity of how the press covers and reports events and issues. PJR Reports meets the need for the continuing education of journalists. Sent to over 500 journalists nationwide, PJR Reports also serves as a regular forum for the discussion of the issues and problems of the news media in the Philippines. PJR Reports serves as a reference for journalism faculty and students in universities and colleges.

PJR Reports was first released as a quarterly and then as a bimonthly journal. It is now released monthly to make the material more accessible to the public.

=== Jaime V. Ongpin Awards for Excellence in Journalism (JVOAEJ) ===
CMFR holds the Jaime V. Ongpin Awards for Excellence in Journalism (JVOAEJ) yearly to promote the practice of investigative journalism and explanatory reporting. These involve basic building blocks for any kind of reporting: research, inquiry, and corroboration to ensure the validity of one's findings. CMFR serves as the technical and administrative secretariat of the awards.

In 1995, the program initiated the first Jaime V. Ongpin Journalism Seminar on Investigative Journalism in order to broaden public interest and support for the development of investigative journalism. The seminar, now known as the Jaime V. Ongpin Journalism Seminar, invites journalism students and faculty from different schools to interact with a panel of finalists who discuss their articles and views on journalism.

=== Freedom Watch ===
CMFR monitors attacks against and threats to press freedom in the Philippines. It maintains a database of journalists killed in the line of duty and trains a national network of journalists to report on assaults against the press. Correspondents provide updates on unsolved cases of journalists killed and issue calls for action when necessary. CMFR serves as a clearing house for information to international groups.

CMFR forwards alerts and reports on the state of press freedom in the Philippines to the Southeast Asian Press Alliance (SEAPA), the International Freedom of Expression eXchange (IFEX), Reporters Without Borders (RSF), and the Committee to Protect Journalists (CPJ).

=== Journalism Asia ===
A yearly publication that reports on the state of the press and the issues affecting media in Asia. Contributors are media practitioners from the region who gather for a conference (the Journalism Asia Forum) to discuss selected issues that will be taken up in the magazine.

=== Books and other publications ===
CMFR also publishes reports and books on major topics of media interest and performance such as media and gender issues and media and governance.

==== Books ====
- Libel as Politics
- Philippine Press Freedom Report 2004, 2007, 2008, 2009, and 2010
- The CMFR Monitor: News Media Coverage of the 2010 Campaign and Elections
- The CMFR Monitor: News Media Coverage of the 2007 National Elections
- Philippine Press Freedom Primer: Quick Answers to your Questions
- The CMFR Ethics Manual: A Values Approach to News Media Ethics
- Limited Protection: Press Freedom and Philippine Law
- Citizens’ Media Monitor: A Report on the Campaign and Elections Coverage in the Philippines 2004
- Journalist Killings under the Arroyo administration 2001–2006: A Study by the Center for Media Freedom and Responsibility
- Prize Journalism: A collection of Jaime V. Ongpin Award Winners
- Press Freedom in the Philippines: A Study in Contradictions
- The Media and Peace Reporting
- Five Source Books on Women:
  1. Understanding Women and Politics
  2. Understanding Population and Development
  3. Understanding Women, Work, and Migration
  4. Understanding Violence Against Women
  5. Understanding Reproductive Health
- Peace Process and Media

==== Manuals ====
- Peace Journalism Training Manual
- Monitoring Media Coverage of Elections: A Center for Media Freedom and Responsibility (CMFR) Guidebook
- Media in Court: The Criminal Justice System Guidebook for Reporters
- Reporting Public Policy: A Manual for Journalists
- Journalists’ Safety: Involving Media Owners

==== Conference reports ====
- The Manila Conference on Impunity and Press Freedom
- Access to Economic Information
- Corruption in Media: A Multi-Sectoral Perspective
- Freedom of Economic Information for Effective Governance
- News Media and Civil Society
- The Road Beyond EDSA: The Post-Estrada Reform Agenda
- Media and Local Government: Corruption and Access to Information

CMFR has developed training modules in the following areas:

- Campus Journalism
- Media and Civil Society
- Media and Corruption
- Media and Disaster
- Media and Economic Information
- Media and Judiciary
- Media and Peace
- Media and Public Policy
- Media and Women

=== Press Councils ===
CMFR has been working with partners in the press, academe, and non-governmental organizations to plan, build, and launch local press councils since 2001. To date, it has helped establish the Cebu Citizens-Press Council and regional press councils in Baguio and Palawan.

== Network ==
CMFR is a founding member of the Freedom Fund for Filipino Journalists (FFFJ) and currently serves as its secretariat. It is also a founding member of the Southeast Asian Press Alliance (SEAPA) and an International Freedom of Expression Exchange (IFEX) member.

== Awards ==
CMFR is a recipient of the Catholic Mass Media Award for Public Service in 1993 and the Joaquin "Chino" Roces Award in 1998. In 2005, CMFR won second prize in the ethics and values category of the Templeton Freedom Awards of the United States-based Atlas Economic Research Foundation.

== Officers ==
- Executive Director
  - Melinda Quintos de Jesus
- Deputy Director/PJR Reports Editor
  - Luis V. Teodoro
- Board of Directors
  - Dr. Jose Abueva
  - Fr. Joaquin Bernas, S.J.
  - Atty. Fulgencio Factoran Jr.
  - Melinda Quintos de Jesus
  - Maribel Ongpin
  - Tina Monzon-Palma
  - Paulynn Paredes-Sicam
  - Vergel O. Santos
  - Luis V. Teodoro

== See also ==
- Reporters Without Borders
- Committee to Protect Journalists
- Cebu Citizens-Press Council
