= Lake Blackshear =

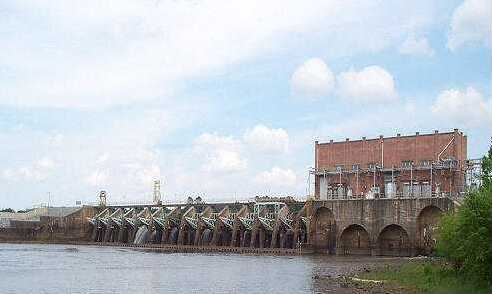

- Location within Georgia Location within the United States
- Location: Georgia
- Coordinates: 31°50′53″N 83°56′31″W
- Type: reservoir
- Primary inflows: Flint River
- Primary outflows: Flint River
- Basin countries: United States
- Max. length: 20 mi (32 km)
- Max. width: 1 mi (1.6 km)
- Surface area: 8,500 acres (34 km^{2})
- Average depth: 10.5 ft (3.2 m)
- Max. depth: 47 ft (14 m)
- Shore length^{1}: 95 mi (153 km)
- Surface elevation: 237 ft (72 m)
- ^{1} Shore length is not a well-defined measure.

Lake Blackshear is a man-made lake on the Flint River in Georgia created by a dam that was constructed from 1925 to 1930. The lake was named after General David Blackshear.

The Crisp County Power Dam, also known as the Warwick Dam, was the first county owned, constructed, and operated power dam in the United States, requiring an amendment to the Georgia State Constitution to make the project legally possible. It came online in August, 1930, under the authority of the Crisp County Power Commission.

The lake is approximately 20 miles (32 km) long and varies in width, but is rarely more than one mile (1.6 km) wide; it covers approximately 8,500 acres (34 km^{2}). It was named for David Blackshear, the founder of Fort Early. When the dam was constructed, little effort was made to cut the trees that would soon be underwater. It was believed that the trees would soon die and decompose once submerged. While this was true for many of the trees, there are still many living Cypress trees in the middle of the lake, there are still many dead trees that have not fallen down, and many large areas, particularly on the northern half of the lake above the Highway 280 bridge, that have stumps below the water line. The stumps, popular with some fishermen, can be risky to recreational boaters. The lake borders five counties in Southwest Georgia: Crisp, Dooly, Lee, Sumter and Worth.

The Georgia Veterans State Park is located on the east side of the lake. Nestled in the middle of the Park is Lake Blackshear Resort & Golf Club providing visitors with views of Lake.
