= Crisp County Power Commission =

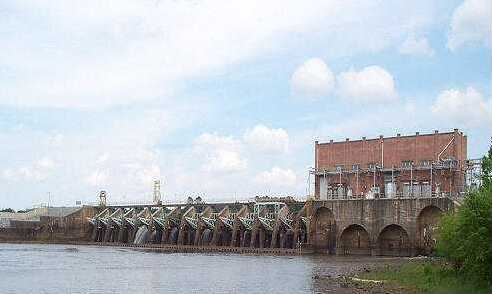
The Lake Blackshear Dam and Reservoir, constructed by the Crisp County Power Commission, serves approximately 23,000 people. The power-dam was the first in the United States to be owned, constructed and operated by a county.

In 1925, after an amendment was made to the Georgian constitution, the Crisp County Power Commission (CCPC) was established. The amendment was the result of a petition made by a group of residents from Crisp County to develop a hydroelectric power system along the Flint River. Georgia government officials decided to build a power-dam in order to satisfy the Crisp County resident's request. The Crisp County Hydroelectric Power Dam, proposed by CCPC, was the first power-dam in the United States to be owned, built and operated by a county.

== History ==
Due to the suggestion made by several Crisp County citizens to build a hydroelectric power resource on the Flint River, the Crisp County Power Commission was established after an amendment to the Georgia State Constitution was completed. The Amendment of 1925 in the Georgia State Constitution stated that CCPC's primary purpose was to support "the agricultural, industrial and civic interests" of the inhabitants of Crisp County. The Georgia government decided that the Commission would be governed by a seven-member Board, comprising three County Commissioners and four members appointed by the Crisp County Grand Jury and has 300 staff to operate the Dam and Reservoir.

CCPC's first task was to issue $1.25 million in revenue bonds in order to finance the Lake Blackshear Dam and Reservoir. The construction of the project was completed, and the power was first generated in August 1930. Before the construction of the dam, like all rural areas of the South, residents of Crisp County did not have any type of electrical service. After the construction of the Lake Blackshear Dam and Reservoir, the Power Commissioners began supplying lines for county residents to receive the benefits of the newly generated electricity.

== Electric Power ==
One of the most notable features of Crisp County is having the capability to provide reliable electric power. The community possesses one of the very few debt-free, county-owned hydroelectric generating plants in the country. The area of Cordele/Crisp County offers some of the most inexpensive electric power in the southeastern portion of the United States. The demand for power surpassed the amount that was available over a period of time from the hydroelectric facility. In 1957, CCPC constructed one of the first combined-cycle facilities containing a 12.5 megawatt coal plant and a 5 megawatt natural gas combustion turbine. Yet more power was needed in 1975, and CCPC became one of the launching members of the Municipal Electric Authority of Georgia (MEAG). MEAG is a Joint Action Agency serving forty-nine public power units in Georgia and co-owns generating and transmission facilities with the other major wholesale suppliers in the state of Georgia. Being a member of MEAG affords Crisp County the ability to fund and construct any future generating or transmission facilities on a financial scale that may be required by Crisp County residents. Also, with MEAG's membership in Georgia's Integrated Transmission System (ITS), the county has access to power lines located throughout the state of Georgia for receipt or delivery of any needed level of power.

== Demographics ==
Serving an area of approximately 330 square miles (850 km^{2}) including the Cordele and Arabi district, the Commission uses a network of around 850 miles (1,370 km) of circulation and transmission of power lines. CCPC also serves approximately 12,000 meters with a peak load of 90MW. The Lake Blackshear Dam and Reservoir, owned and generated by CCPC, has two earth dams, each standing at around 30 feet (9.1 m) high. The two dams on Lake Blackshear are referred to as the North and South dams. The North dam is 3,400 feet (1,000 m) long, and the smaller South dam is only 650 feet (200 m) long.

== Crisp County Power Commissioners ==
The current CCPC Board consists of four members appointed by the Crisp County Grand Jury and three County Commissioners. There are five total Commissioners; however, only three serve on the board at a time. The current members are:

- Rick Lawson, Attorney
- Mark Crenshaw
- Ray Hughes, Chairman
- James R. "Dickie" Dowdey III
- John Pridgen
- Larry Felton
- James Nance
- Russell Slade
- Sammie Farrow Jr.
- Alissa Wilkerson, Vice Chairman
