= Georgia Veterans State Park =

Heritage site in Cordele, Georgia, USA

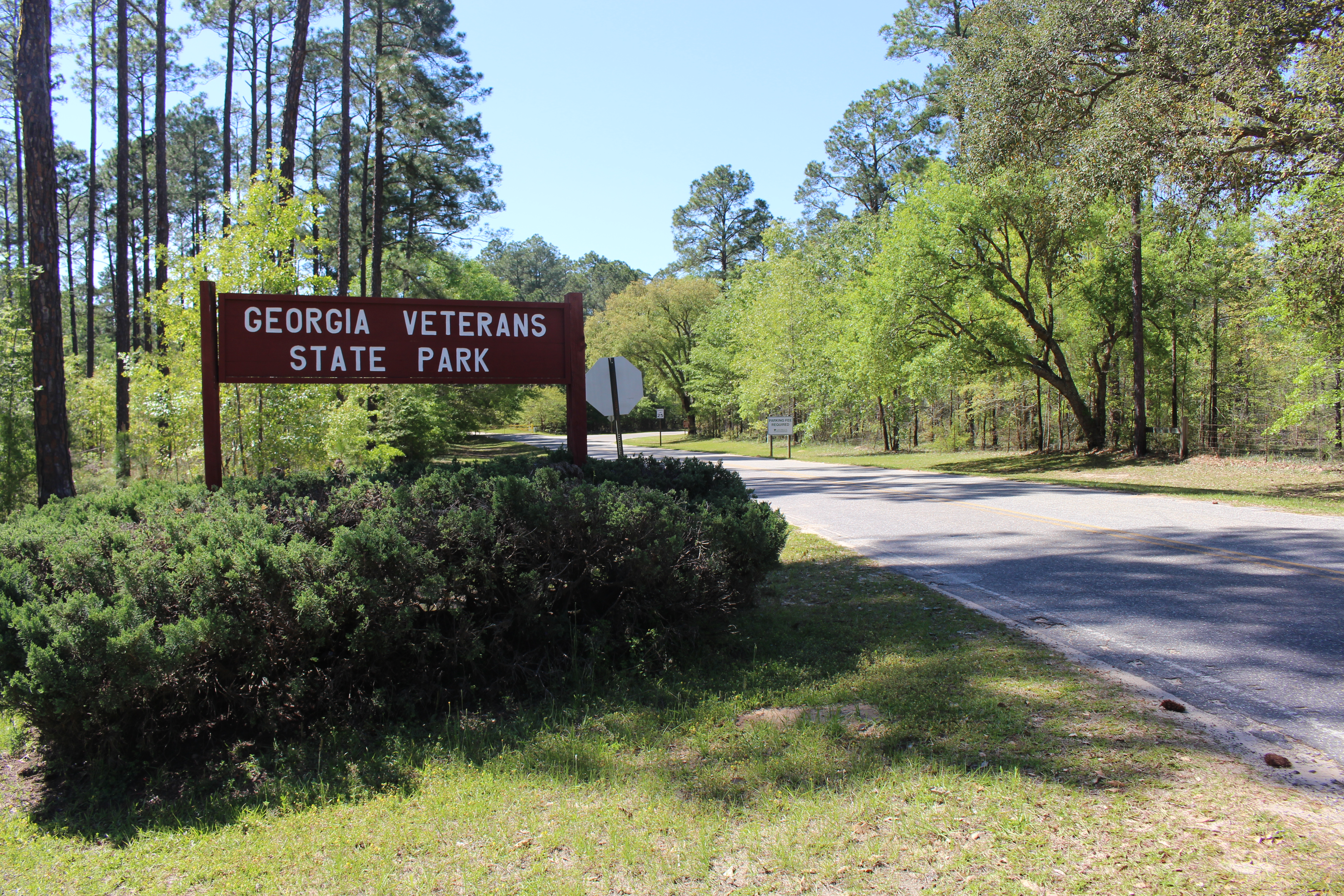
- Georgia Veterans State Park entrance

- Location within Georgia
- Location: Crisp County, Georgia
- Nearest city: Cordele, Georgia
- Coordinates: 31°57′23″N 83°54′58″W
- Area: 1,308 acres (530 ha)

Georgia Veterans State Park (originally the Georgia Veterans Memorial State Park) is a state park located on Lake Blackshear in Crisp County, west of Cordele, Georgia. It was established on December 4, 1946, as a memorial to U.S. Veterans. The 1,308-acre (5 km^{2}) park features a museum with aircraft, vehicles, weapons, uniforms and other memorabilia dating from the Revolutionary War to the present.

Other attractions include 8,600-acre (35 km^{2}) Lake Blackshear, a conference center, cabins, campground, marina and golf club and the SAM Shortline Excursion Train, which runs from Cordele to Plains.

== Facilities ==
- 82 campsites for tents, trailers or RVs
- Pioneer campground
- 18-hole golf course
- Lake Blackshear Resort
  - Conference Center
  - Beach
  - Marina
  - Cypress Grill
  - 10 cottages
- 1 mile (1.6 km) nature trail
- Four picnic shelters
- Group shelter that seats 150
- R/C model airplane flying field

== Activities ==
- Boating
- Waterskiing
- Pontoon Boat Rentals
- Archery and Air Soft Rifle Range
- Hiking
- Bike Rentals
- Fishing
- Birdwatching
- Disc Golf
- Veteran's Museum
- Sam Shortline Train

The fish in Lake Blackshear include bass, crappie, catfish and bream.

== Photos ==
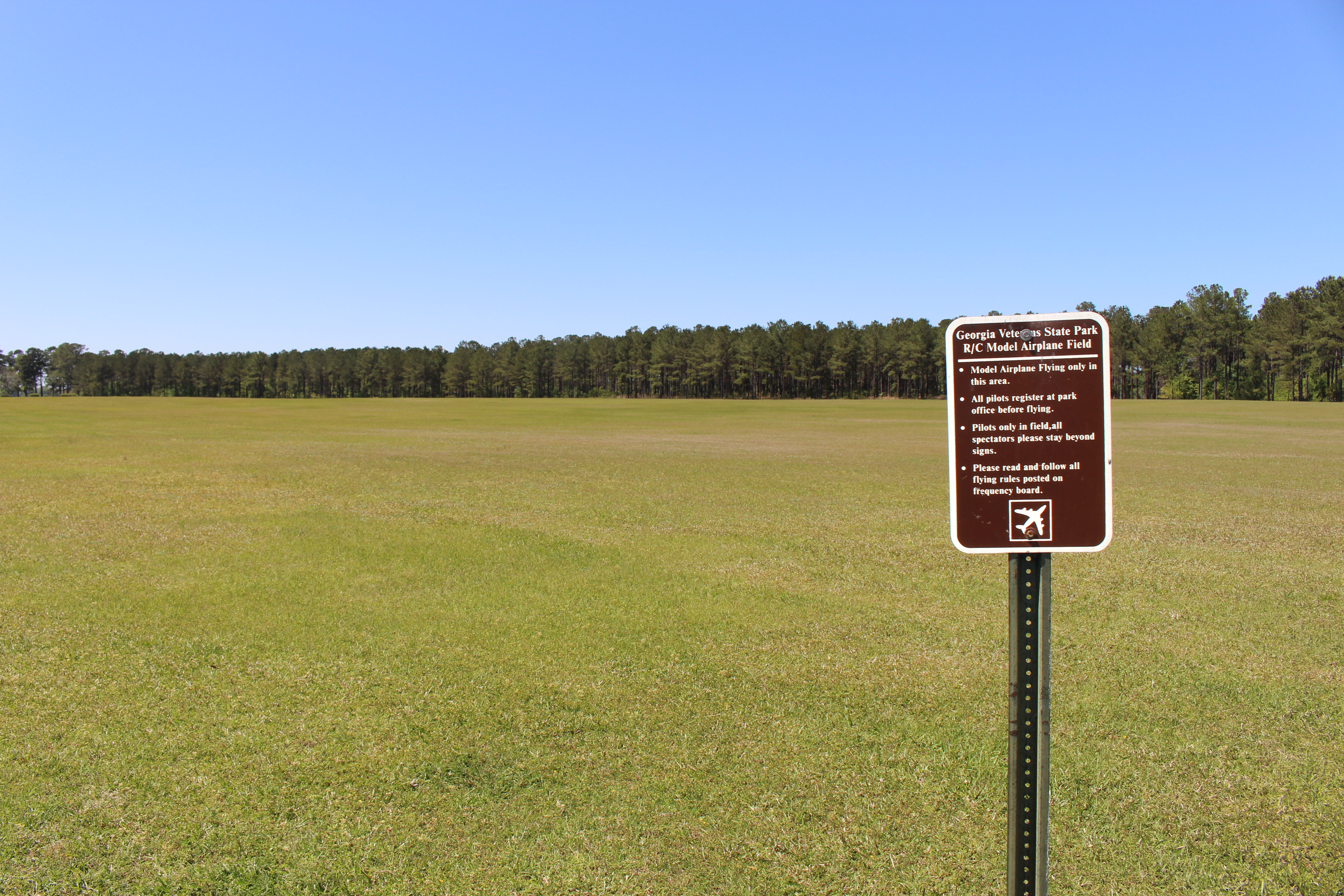
RC Model Airplane Field

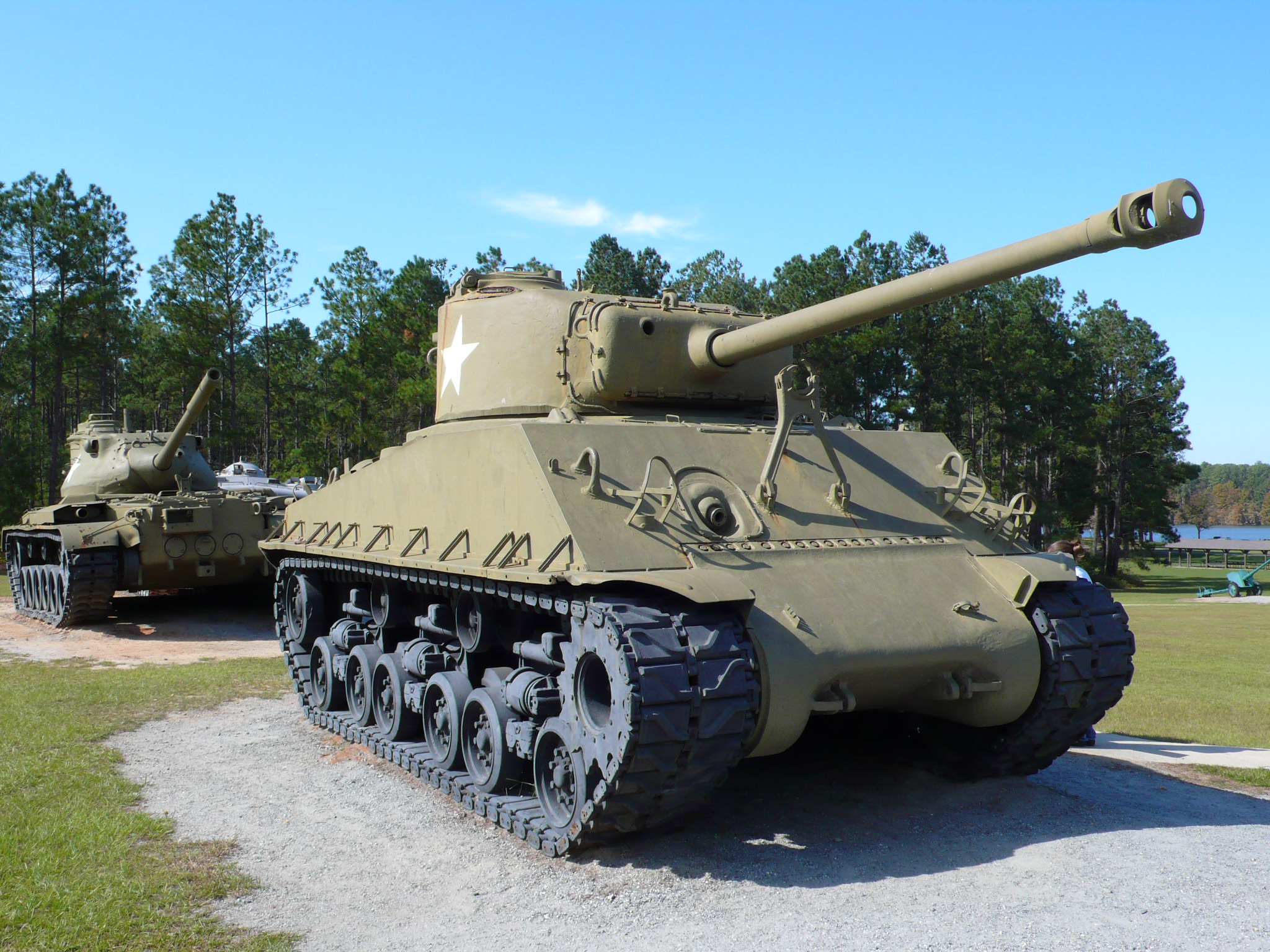
Tanks on display at Ga. Veterans S.P.

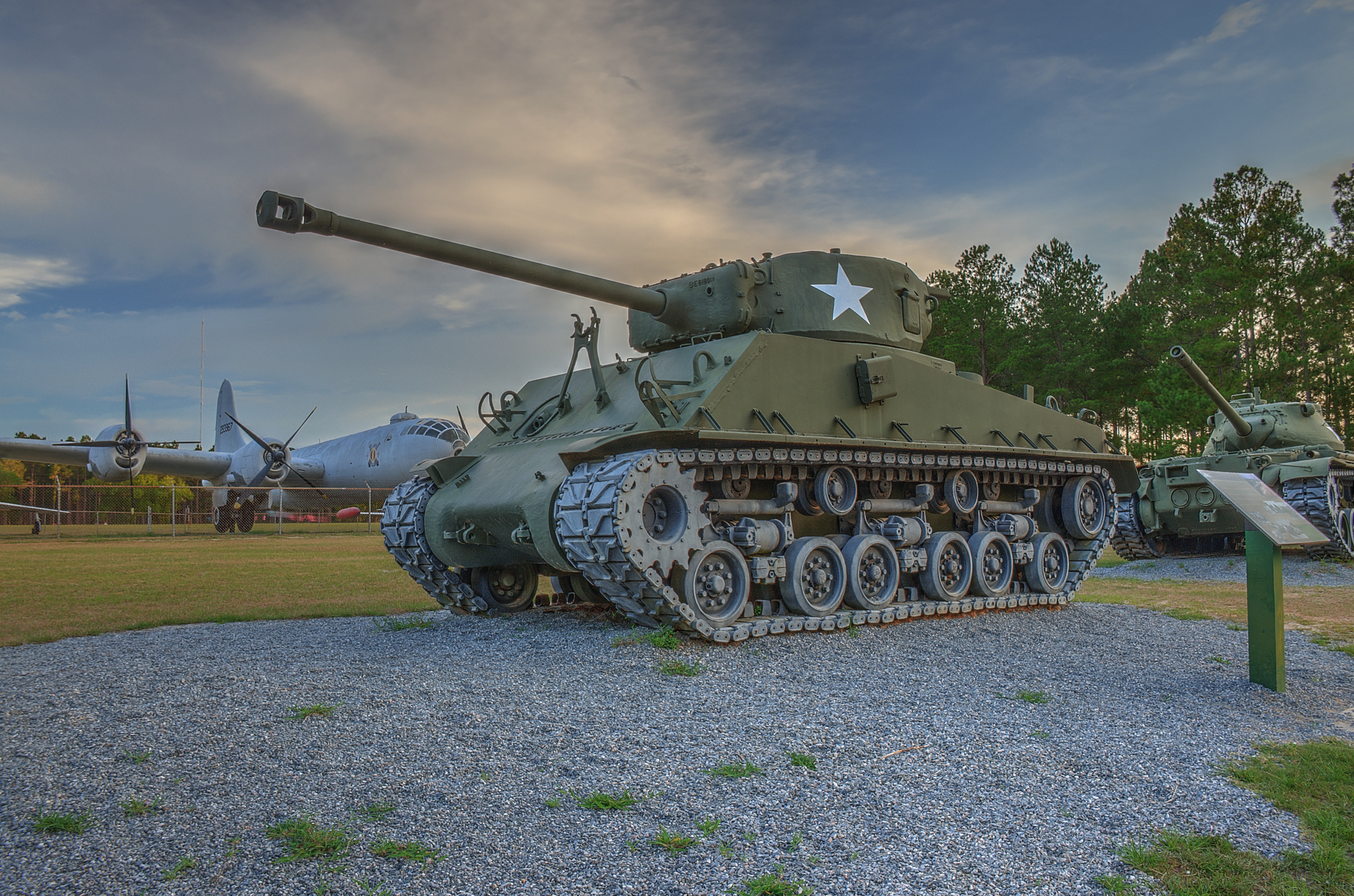
M4A3E8 Sherman Medium Tank

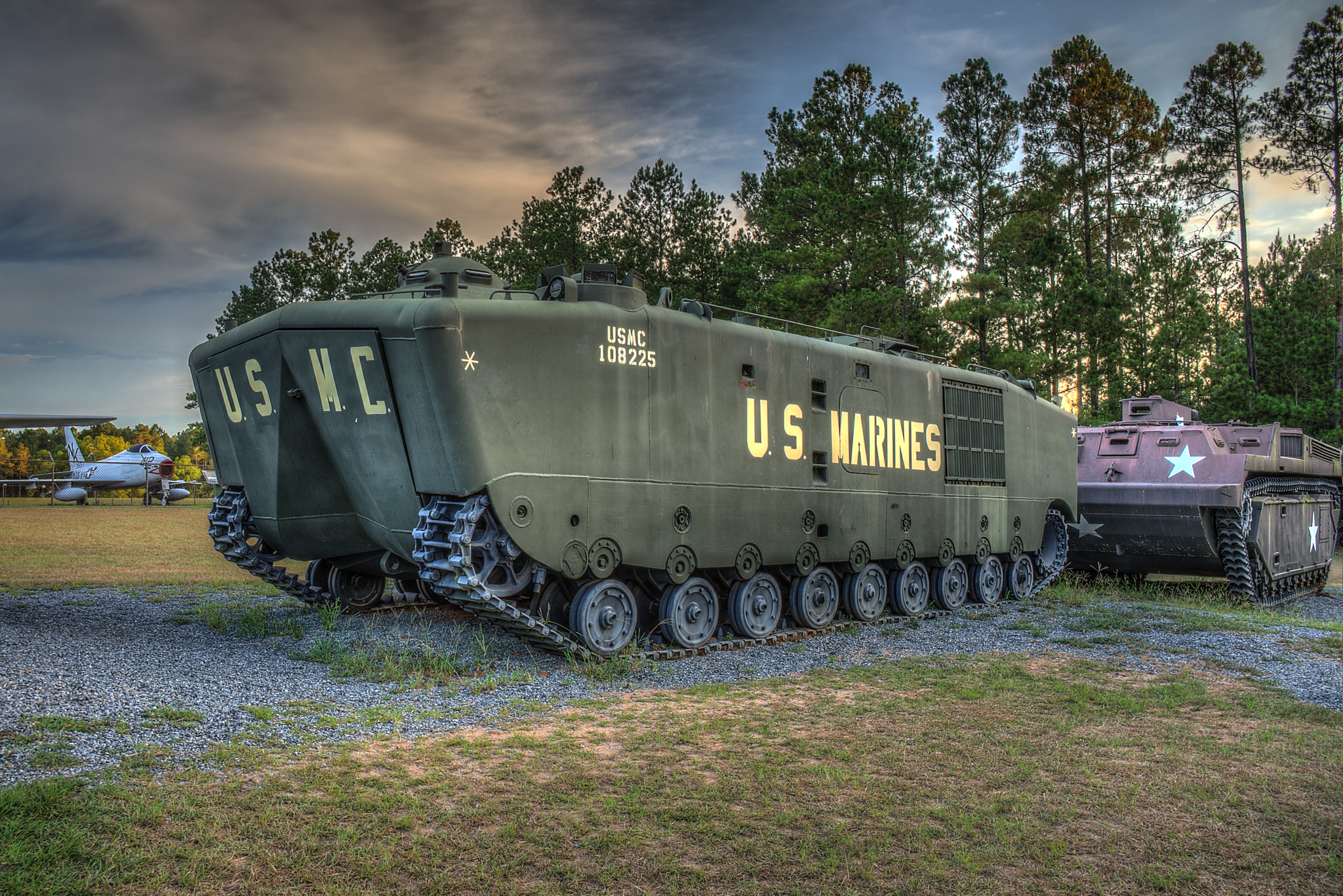
LVTP-5 armored fighting vehicle

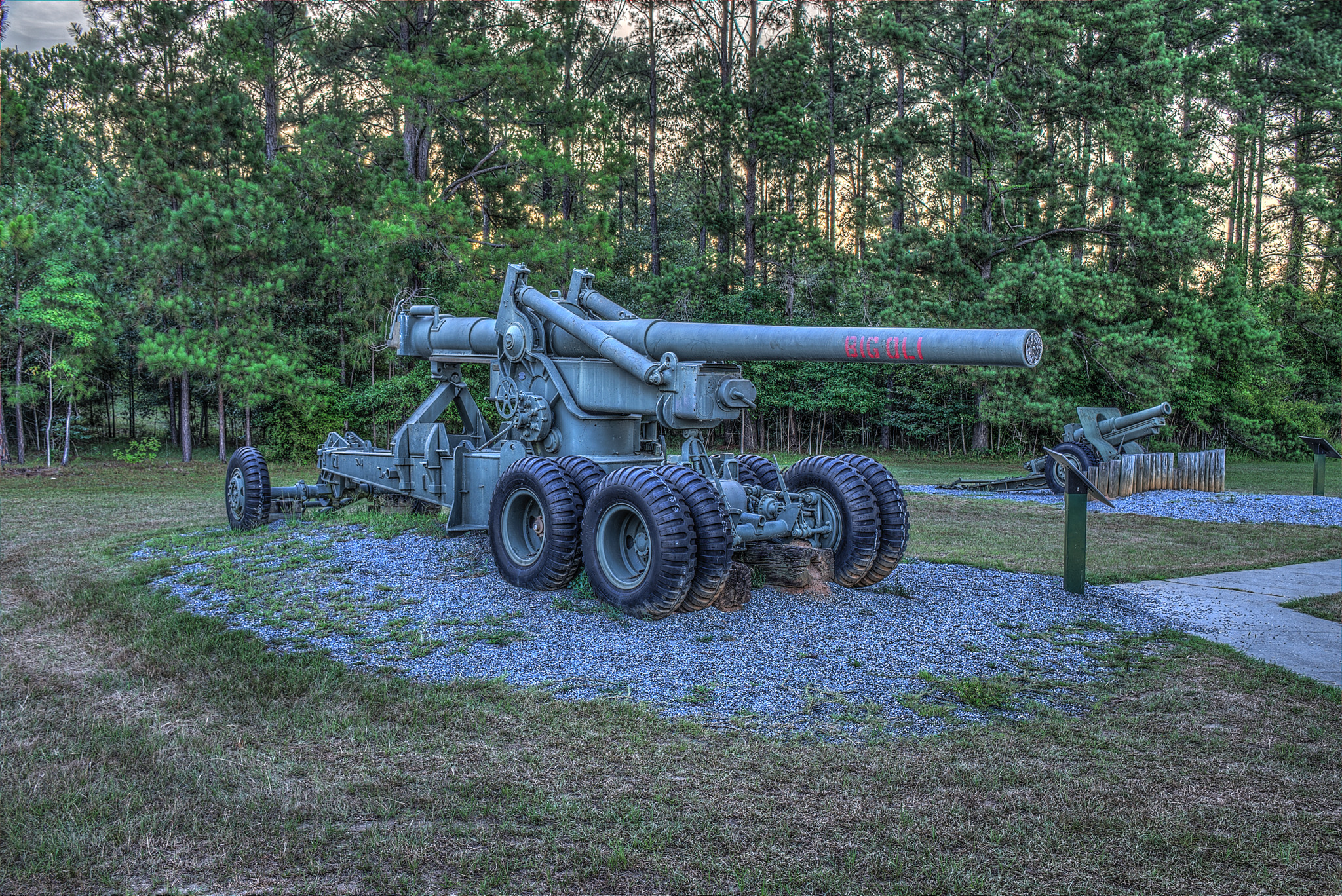
155 mm Long Tom

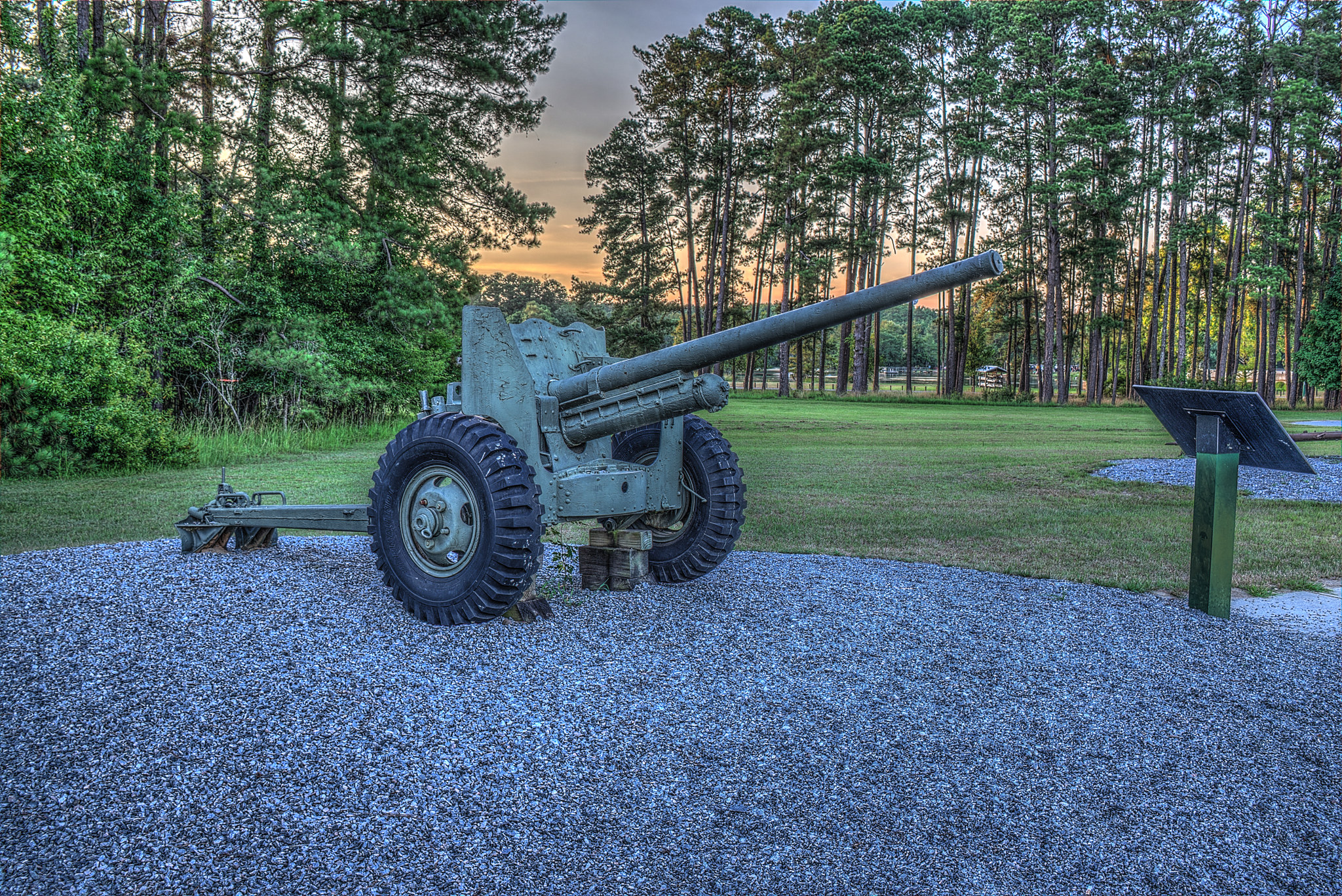
57 mm Gun M1

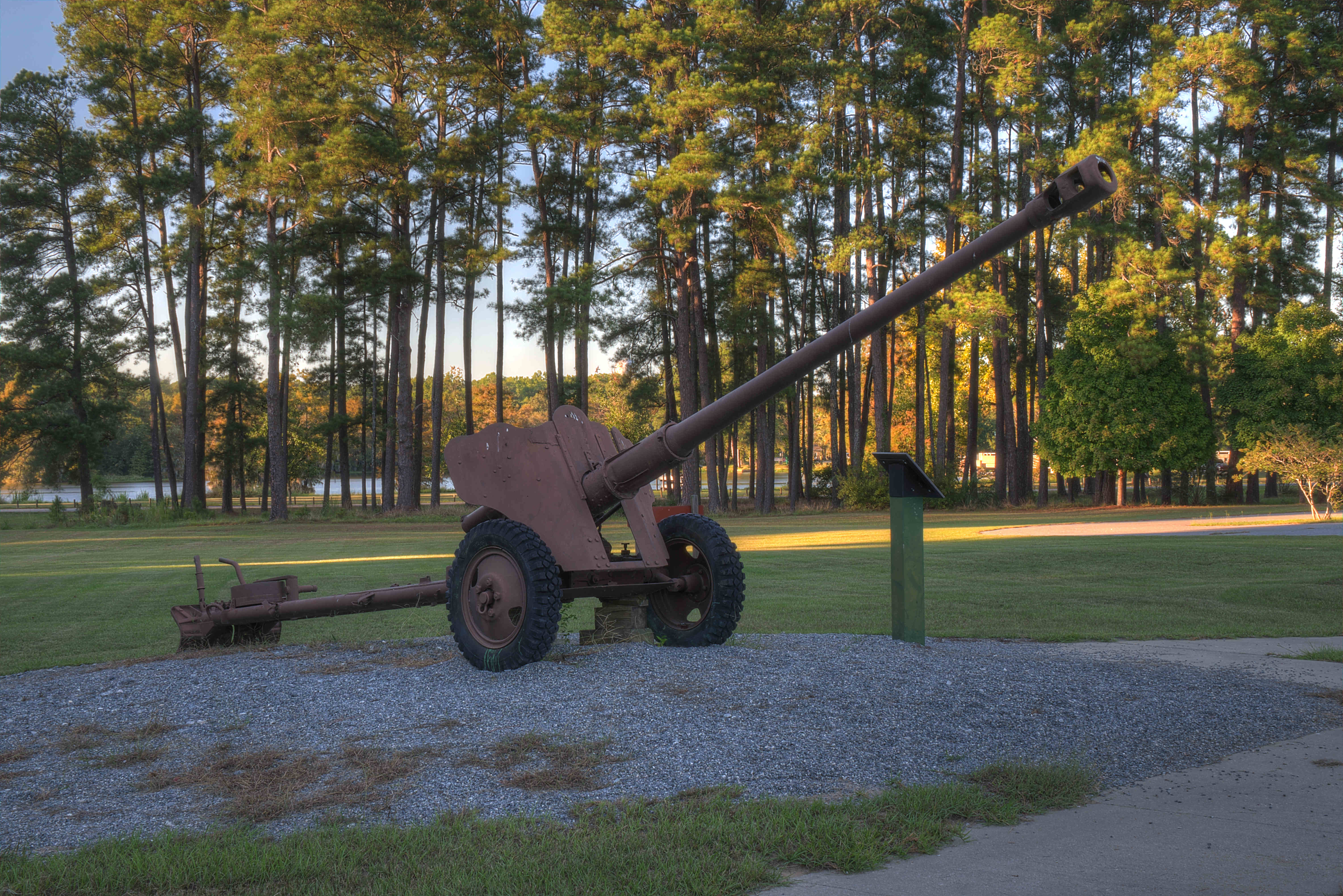
85 mm divisional gun D-44

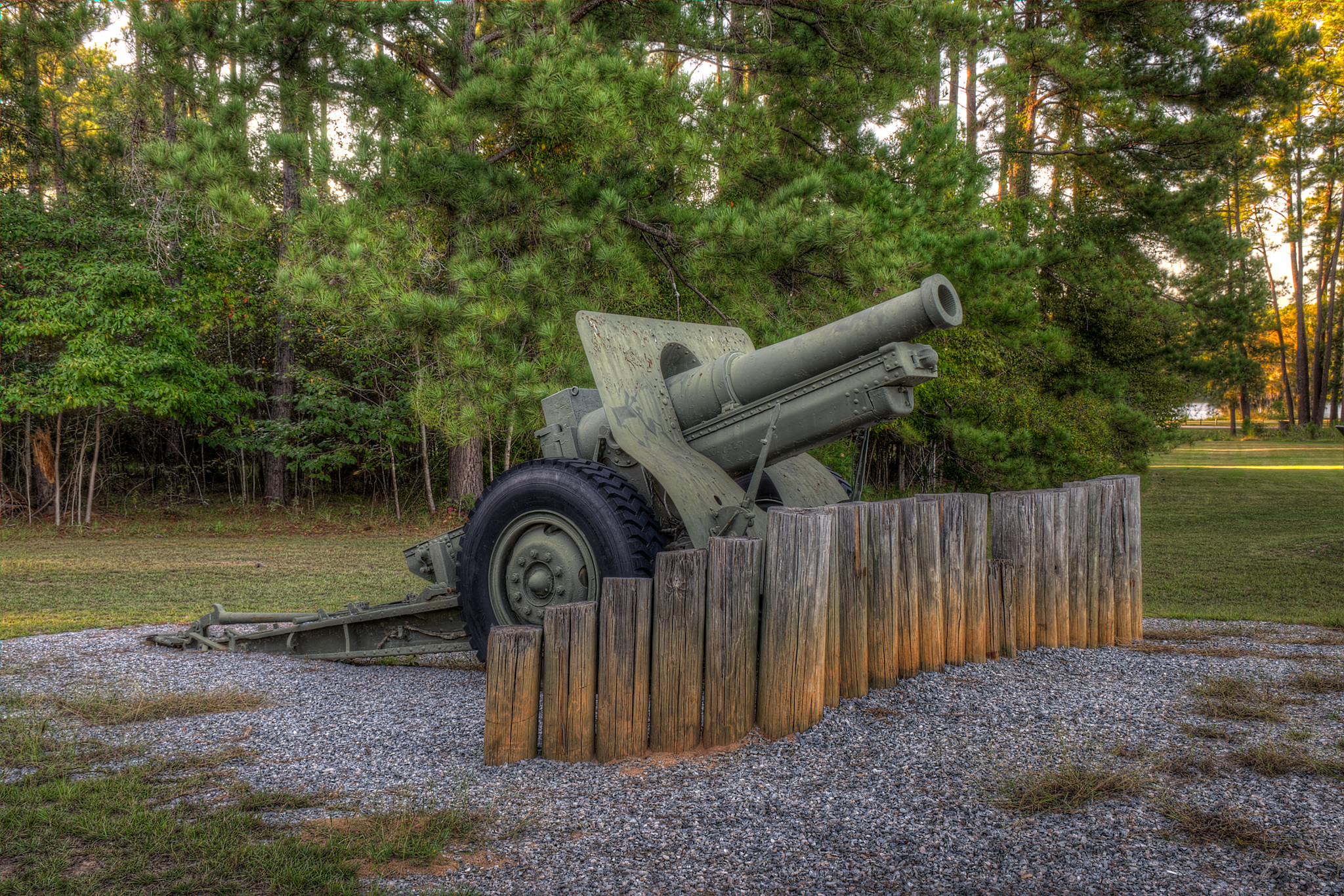
155 mm Howitzer M1918A3 Schneider

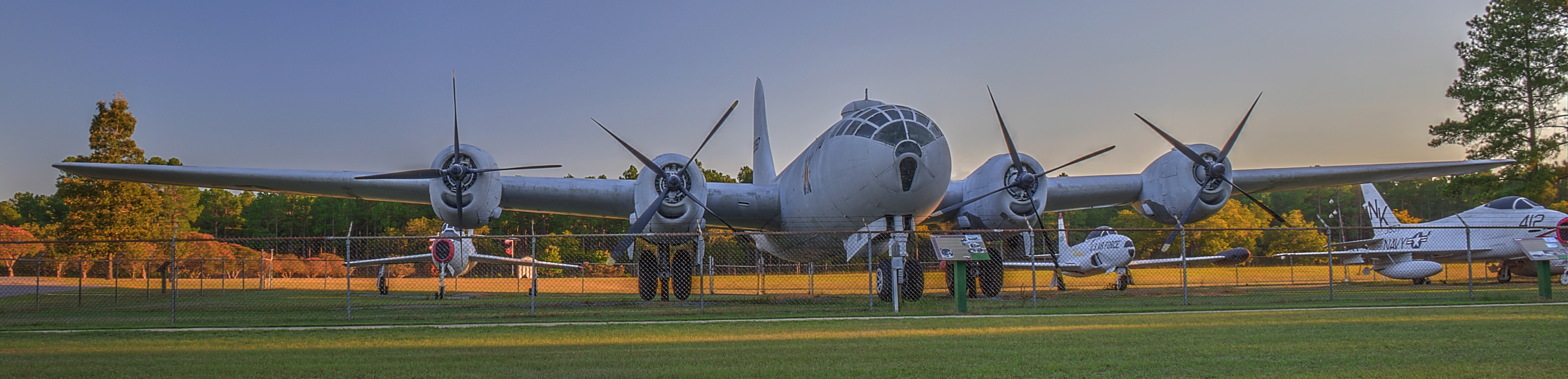
Boeing B-29A, (B-29A-15-BN, AAF Ser. No. 42-93967) built in Marietta, GA
