= Citizens' Committee for Pollution Control =

Former Canadian environmental organization

Citizens' Committee for Pollution Control (CCPC) was an environmental organization established in 1970 in Burlington, Ontario, Canada. The organization ran Canada's first sustained multi-material citywide recycling program. In 2012, the organization was renamed as Recycling Revisited and was incorporated as a registered non-profit.

Recycling Revisited operates out of Hamilton-Burlington area and is involved in various community environmental projects including tree-planting, public recycling initiatives, and environmental activism. They also mentor youth interested in the environment through committees that focus on their individual passions.

== History ==
CCPC was founded in 1970 by Roberta McGregor (then Golightly), a resident of Burlington. In Canada, public awareness of recycling in 1970 was low, and McGregor saw few opportunities to address environmental problems in her community. After learning that local companies would take cans, glass and paper to recycle; she and Mary Jane Boelhouwer, another Burlington resident, engaged their women's conversation group in running a two-week experimental project with a few hundred households, to assess residents' interest in recycling. After the two-week experiment, citizens began dropping off recyclables at the Golightly driveway and signing on to volunteer as other private garages came into use as depots. CCPC grew to a network of 21 neighbourhood depots throughout the city, cleared twice weekly by volunteers. With this expansion, and involvement with related environmental issues, CCPC membership rapidly grew to 1,000.

The City of Burlington donated a recycling centre for CCPC's recycling program in 1971. Later, a larger building replaced the original recycling centre and remained in use until 1983.

CCPC collaborated with the Government of Ontario and the City of Burlington in a pilot project to test public participation in a curbside pickup program from August 1971 to February 1972, with more than one thousand households. Materials collected were tin, glass, aluminum, cardboard and newspaper. The CCPC program proceeded as usual in the rest of the city during the months of the Pilot Study. A final report on the study was published by the Ontario Government under the title "Burlington Waste Reclamation Pilot Study".

From its inception, CCPC promoted the importance of government being responsible for recycling. There was no model for municipal recycling programs for Burlington to follow, but in 1977, Mayor Mary Munro established a Mayor's Task Force to consider the practicalities of running this type of program in the City of Burlington. Two CCPC Coordinators were part of the Task Force as Subcommittee Chairs. The results were formally reported to the City of Burlington.

In 1981, the City of Burlington hired a contractor, becoming the first city in Ontario to run an ongoing curbside recycling program. CCPC disbanded in 1983, having met their primary goal of handing over recycling to the city government.

== Media attention ==
CCPC was featured in Chatelaine magazine, Reader's Digest, and the CBC. According to the City of Burlington, CCPC's recycling centre was the first in Canada.
