= Cebu Citizens-Press Council =

- Cebu Citizens Press Council logo
- Abbreviation: CCPC
- Formation: September 21, 2005; 20 years ago (1st membership meeting)
- Type: Press Council
- Location: Cebu City
- Executive Director: Atty. Pachico A. Seares
- Website: cebucitizenspresscouncil.org

The Cebu Citizens-Press Council is a forum for media issues and for airing grievance based in Cebu City, Philippines. It aims to defend press freedom and promote professional journalism. The CCPC was registered with the Securities and Exchange Commission as a non-stock, non-profit organization in 2006.

But the idea for the council began much earlier. In 2001, three Cebu journalists—Eileen Mangubat of Cebu Daily News, Noel Pangilinan of The Freeman and Pachico Seares of SunStar Cebu—spoke in Manila with Marvin Tort, then executive director of the Philippine Press Council, about setting up a local press council. In Cebu, journalist Juan Mercado helped lay the groundwork for the organization.

There were consultations with potential members as well as with Melinda Quintos-de Jesus of the Center for Media Freedom and Responsibility, which wanted to help set up press councils in Cebu, Palawan and Baguio.

A year later, Seares presented to the prospective members the proposed Code of Practice and Rules of Procedure of CCPC, adopted from foreign models and from consultations with other convenors and based on the local experience. Then the project went to sleep—for three years.

== Revival ==
In 2005, Seares volunteered for SunStar Cebu to lead the revival of the CCPC. The council held its first membership meeting on Sept. 21, 2005 and has been meeting regularly ever since.

The council has 15 members, of whom seven are members from the media. These are the representatives of the five daily newspapers in Cebu and two representatives from the Kapisanan ng mga Brodkaster ng Pilipinas-Cebu. Two members of the council are from the academe, while six are from the general public.

As a forum for news subjects to air their grievances, the CCPC hopes to provide an added means of redress to reduce the incidence of lawsuits and violence against journalists. The CCPC entertains two types of complaints, those relating to 1) the right to reply and 2) the accuracy of the material printed or broadcast. More details are available at its website at www.cebucitizenspresscouncil.org.

As a forum for media issues, CCPC has added its voice to the national discussion on bills in Congress that affect the media, including bills that seek to decriminalize libel, legislate the right of reply, limit the venue of libel to the principal place of operation of the community journalist, and expand the coverage of the exemption of journalists from revealing the sources of their news to include broadcast, wire and Internet media.

The council makes its position on bills known to Congress through position papers and resolutions drafted with the help of its legal adviser, the Cebu Media Legal Aid.

To improve media literacy, the CCPC conducts consultations with various sectors of society, including news sources and students, to improve their understanding of the workings of media.

In 2010, it opened the Cebu Journalism and Journalists (CJJ) Gallery at Museo Sugbo in Cebu City with the support of the Cebu Provincial Government. It also worked for the reinstallation of the marker for Cebu’s first post-war press freedom martyr, Antonio Abad Tormis, with the help of the Cebu City Government.
