= Vera Files =

News organization in the Philippines

- Formation: March 2008; 18 years ago
- Founders: Ellen Tordesillas; Luz Rimban; Booma Cruz; Jennifer Santillan-Santiago; Yvonne Chua; Chit Estella
- President: Ellen Tordesillas
- Affiliations: International Fact-Checking Network
- Website: verafiles.org

Vera Files (stylized as VERA Files) is a non-profit online news organization in the Philippines, known for its institutionalized role in fact-checking false information in the Philippines, and as one of the news organizations most prominently targeted by intimidation and censorship due to its critical coverage of the Philippine government. It is part of the International Fact-Checking Network of the Poynter Institute and is one of Facebook's two Philippine partners in its third-party fact-checking program.

The organization was founded in March 2008 by six veteran Filipino journalists, focusing on investigative journalism and in-depth reporting of Philippine social issues. According to its website, the organization specializes in producing "research-intensive and in-depth reports in multiple formats, and the training and mentoring of journalists, students and civil society organizations, especially those whose opportunities for capacity building are scarce."

== History ==
=== Founding and early work ===
Vera Files was established in 2008 by six prominent Philippine journalists who all specialized in investigative reporting: Ellen Tordesillas, Jennifer Santillan-Santiago, Booma Cruz, Luz Rimban, Yvonne Chua, and Chit Estella.

Tordesillas and Santillan-Santiago had started out as reporters during the dictatorship of President Ferdinand Marcos and then moved on to Ang Pahayagang Malaya and the Philippine Daily Inquirer, respectively. Booma Cruz was a writer for Newsbreak and program manager of the TV program Probe Team. GMA and ABS CBN reporter Luz Rimban, Malaya reporter Yvonne Chua, and Pinoy Times editor in chief Chit Estella had all previously also held senior posts at the Philippine Center for Investigative Journalism. Estella's exposés with the Pinoy Times were noted to have played a role in the ouster of Philippine President Joseph Estrada.

The original idea of Vera Files founding members was to establish a newsmagazine in the style of George, a New York-based politics-as-lifestyle glossy which was active from 1995 to 2001. However, they decided to publish as a website instead, choosing the name “Vera Files” because they wanted the word “Truth” to be part of the organization's name.

Vera Files released its first story—an exposé on a controversial agreement involving disputed territory—on March 9, 2008. The story was written by Yvonne T. Chua and Ellen Tordesillas and published by GMA News Online and Malaya.

Interested in investigative and in-depth reporting, the founding journalists of Vera Files felt that accepting advertisements, which was the usual way Philippine media organizations earned their income, would result in a conflict of interest. Initially, they pooled their own money to pay for the new outfit's registration with the Philippines’ Securities and Exchange Commission, and then operated without a headquarters, meeting in restaurants and coffeeshops instead. Eventually, they decided to start looking for grants which fund press organizations.

Vera Files' early projects multiyear project on reporting on Persons with Disabilities, sponsored by The Asia Foundation with additional support from the Australian Embassy to the Philippines; American news organization Internews funded reporting to promote Environmental Protection Reporters Without Borders later took Vera Files on as its Philippine partner for a media ownership project which sought to determine who were the owners of media in various countries. The British Embassy in Manila also released a grant for VeraFiles to conduct training on Investigative Journalism for Philippine Non-Government Organizations.

An investigative report on the links between poverty and corruption by Diosa Labiste, Luz Rimban, and Chua for Vera Files was co-winner of the 20th Jaime V. Ongpin Awards for Excellence in Journalism in 2009. Labiste was also awarded the Marshall McLuhan Fellowship by the Canadian Embassy.

In 2011, VeraFiles founder Chit Estella was killed in a traffic accident in Quezon City near the University of the Philippines Diliman where she was teaching. The incident led Vera Files to take on a road safety promotion project, which was partly funded by the World Health Organization.

=== Fact-checking project ===
Vera Files co-founder Chua began the Vera Files' fact-checking project during the national elections in 2016. It started as a project by her students at the University of the Philippines College of Mass Communications, where Chua teaches as an associate professor. The articles were then published on the Vera Files website under the "Is That So?" section.

In 2020, Chua was given the Gawad Tsanselor para sa Natatanging Guro by the University of the Philippines Diliman for excellence in teaching, research, and public service.

=== Freedom of speech advocacy ===
In 2020, Vera Files, Center for International Law, Lyceum of the Philippines University College of Law professors, Foundation for Media Alternatives, and Democracy.Net.Ph filed a petition asking the Supreme Court to declare the Anti-Terror Law unconstitutional. The petitioners contended that the law "infringes on the right to freedom of speech by making mere possession of objects and collecting or making of documents as acts of terrorism".

== Attacks on Vera Files and other media institutions ==
In January 2018, Vera Files was hit by a prolonged Internet Distributed Denial of Service (DDoS) cyber attack 30 minutes after it published an article about then president Rodrigo Duterte and mayor Sara Duterte's financials. Malacañang condemned the cyber attack on Vera Files afterward.

After the announcement by Facebook that it became a fact-checking partner was made in April 2018, Vera Files, along with Rappler, became the target of attacks by Diehard Duterte Supporters, digital influencers, and internet trolls aligned with the administration of Rodrigo Duterte.

In December 2021, Vera Files, along with ABS-CBN News and Rappler experienced additional DDoS cyberattacks that appeared to have been politically motivated and possibly related to the upcoming national elections. Unusual traffic on Vera Files' website was detected by website security service Deflect.ca on pages relating to electronic cigarettes and social media fact-checks relating to then presidential candidate Bongbong Marcos. The National Union of Journalists of the Philippines called on the government to investigate the attacks.

Aside from Vera Files, other news sites involved in fact-checking initiatives were also hit by DDoS attacks, such as Mindanao Gold Star Daily, Interaksyon, PressOne.PH, and ABS-CBN News. GMA News Online, CNN Philippines, Bulatlat, Kodao Productions, and Pinoy Media Center were also the targets of similar attacks.

Members of the Philippine Congress called for an investigation over the increasing cyberattacks on the media outfits. The International Federation of Journalists also condemned and demanded an investigation of the cyberattacks.

== Partnerships and affiliations ==
In 2017, Vera Files became the first news organization in the Philippines to be a verified signatory of the International Fact-Checking Network at Poynter. To be a verified signatory of the IFCN, an organization is required to be non-partisan and fair, transparent about their sources, funding and organization, methodology, and have an open and honest corrections policy.

In April 2018, social media company Facebook tapped Vera Files and news website Rappler to be part of its third-party fact-checking program in the Philippines. The program aims to help Facebook flag or identify false news stories shared by people on its social media platform. Facebook Pages that share false news stories repeatedly will also be seen less on people's news feeds. The program, according to Vera File's announcement, "is in line with Facebook’s three-part framework to improve the quality and authenticity of stories in the News Feed." Journalism professor Luis V. Teodoro explained the timing and context of the program, noting how the administration of President Rodrigo Duterte had been antagonistic toward Vera Files and Rappler for fact-checking lies made by Duterte and other government officials. Rodrigo Duterte and members of his government like then Presidential Communications Operations Office undersecretary Lorraine Badoy-Partosa accused the two Philippine-based fact-checkers of Facebook of being biased.

In February 2019, Vera Files joined Tsek.ph, the pioneering collaborative fact-checking journalist and academic consortium spearheaded by the University of the Philippines to combat disinformation. The partnership also included Ateneo de Manila University, De La Salle University, ABS-CBN, Interaksyon, Philippine Star, Probe Productions, Radio World Broadcasting, and Rappler.

Vera Files is a member of the Global Investigative Journalism Network.

It is also used by Google as a trusted source of information to fact check claims on its platforms.

In 2021, Vera Files and more than 40 other media groups and 300 journalists launched an election pledge to provide accurate and reliable information to Philippine voters ahead of the 2022 national elections. Signatories to the pledge included community and independent journalists, as well as Rappler head Maria Ressa and ABS-CBN News senior vice president Ma. Regina Reyes.

In September 2022, Vera Files and Taiwan FactCheck Center announced a collaborative initiative to address misinformation across countries.

== Chit Estella Journalism Awards ==
In 2011, Vera Files announced that it was going to establish the Chit Estella Journalism Awards to help uphold "ideals of excellent and principled journalism". The announcement coincided with the opening of a photo exhibit to honor Estella at the University of the Philippines College of Mass Communication. Father Robert Reyes, Roland Simbulan, friends, relatives, and students also participated in a fun run called "Run for Road Safety, Justice for Chit Estella-Simbulan", held on the same day.

Nominations for the first Chit Estella Journalism Awards were opened in September 2012. Ina Alleco Silverio of Bulatlat and Elizabeth Lolarga of the Philippine Daily Inquirer received the First Chit Estella Journalism Awards, which were announced in December 2012. The trophy given to the winners was designed by University of the Philippines College of Fine Arts' former dean Neil Doloricon. Former Congress representative Satur Ocampo delivered the Chit Estella memorial lecture on human rights and journalism following the awarding ceremony.

== Publications ==
In 2021, Vera Files published Tatlong Kuwento para sa Batang Pilipino (Three Stories for Filipino Children) by Vera Files co-founder Chit Estella. Book illustrations were made by Jeanet Herbosana-Simbulan while the book cover was designed by Fidel L. dela Torre.

In February 2022, Vera Files published a comic book that aimed to counter misinformation on health issues in the Philippines.

== Awards ==
In 2020, Vera Files co-founder Yvonne Chua was given the University of the Philippines Diliman's 2020 Gawad Tsanselor para sa Natatanging Guro (Chancellor Award for Outstanding Teacher).

In 2009, the Vera Files report "Quedancor swine program another fertilizer scam" by Diosa Labiste, Luz Rimban, and Yvonne Chua was given the top prize at the 20th Jaime V. Ongpin Awards for Excellence in Journalism. The report, published in the BusinessMirror, Malaya, The Manila Times, and Philippines Graphic in 2008, was cited for investigating the link between poverty and corruption in the Philippines. Diosa Labiste was given the Marshall McLuhan Prize.

== See also ==
- Fact-checking
- International Fact Checking Network
- Fake news in the Philippines
