= Jose Jaime Espina =

Filipino journalist (1962–2021)

Jose Espina
- Born: 8 March 1962; Bacolod, Negros Occidental, Philippines
- Died: 7 July 2021 (aged 59); Bacolod, Negros Occidental, Philippines
- Education: University of the Philippines Visayas
- Occupation: Journalist
- Spouse: Leny Rojo

Jose Jaime Espina (8 March 1962 – 7 July 2021), also known as Nonoy, was a Filipino journalist who was a co-founder of the National Union of Journalists of the Philippines (NUJP), of which he was later the chair from 2018 until 2021. An advocate for freedom of the press, Espina primarily reported on community issues impacting Filipinos, including the communist armed conflict, human rights issues, internal displacement, and the conflict in Mindanao.

== Journalism ==
When Espina was a student, he served as an editor of Pagbutlak, the student newspaper of the University of the Philippines Visayas. During the regime of Ferdinand Marcos, Espina was a member of the Correspondents, Broadcasters and Reporters Association - Action News Services (COBRA-ANS), which was part of the "mosquito press" that fought against government misinformation. Espina went on to contribute to numerous Filipino news outlets associated with the Philippines' 'alternative press', which was noted for reporting upon human rights abuses perpetrated by the government, and was a co-founder of the NUJP, which he went on to serve as chair from 2018 until shortly before his death. Espina was critical of the presidency of Rodrigo Duterte for its human rights violations, which led to the NUJP, of which Espina was a founding member, being red-tagged as a legal front for communism by the No to Communist Terrorist Group Coalition.

Espina contributed to Inquirer.net, InterAksyon, and the Manila Standard, among others.

Espina was a noted proponent of the rights of media workers, particularly those operating outside of Manila in the Philippines' provinces. He also became an advocate for the victims of the 2009 Ampatuan massacre, which included 32 media workers; the efforts culminated in some of the perpetrators being found guilty of murder in 2019.

In 2020, Espina spoke out in support of the ABS-CBN franchise, which was at risk of being closed down by the government. Previously, he had led rallies in support of the media outlet Rappler after it was ordered to close.

== Recognition ==
Espina was awarded the College Editors Guild of the Philippines' Marcelo H. Del. Pilar Award, which identified him as "without doubt, a leading force in the defence of press freedom and freedom of expression in the country".

== Personal life and death ==
Espina was born in Manila but was raised in Bacolod, Negros Occidental, where he graduated from Negros Occidental High School in 1978. He was married to Leny Rojo, an architecture graduate and an active advocate for social justice, with whom he had two children, Mayumi and Dakila.

Espina died on 7 July 2021 from liver cancer and post-COVID-19 complications at age 59, during the COVID-19 pandemic in the Philippines.

The NUJP paid tribute to him, calling him "a tireless champion for the freedom of the press and the welfare of media workers". The Foreign Correspondents Association of the Philippines referred to Espina as always standing "at the frontlines of the fight against media repression harassment".
