= Mass media in the Philippines =

Mass media in the Philippines consists of several types of media: television, radio, newspapers, magazines, cinema, and websites.

In 2004, the Philippines had 225 television stations, 369 AM radio broadcast stations, 583 FM radio broadcast stations, 10 internet radio stations, 5 shortwave stations and 7 million newspapers in circulation.

Media outlets, such as PTV/RPN/IBC (television) and the Presidential Broadcast Service (radio), are government-run, while most outlets are privately owned.

The most trusted newspapers in the Philippines are the Philippine Daily Inquirer, Manila Bulletin, and The Philippine Star.

== Newspapers ==
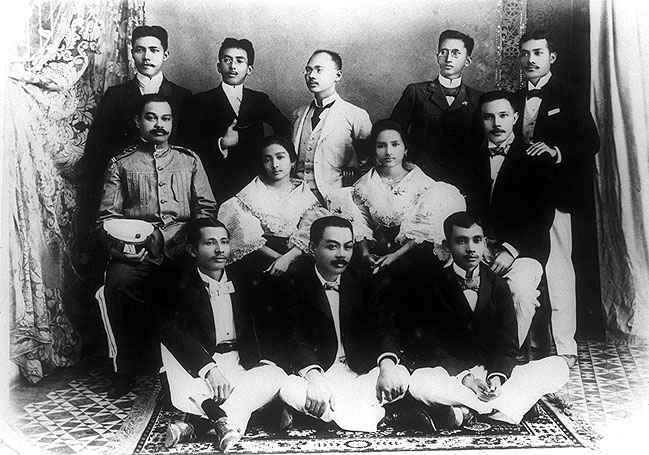
Staff of La Independencia: (Standing): Mariano V. del Rosario, Jose Clemente Zulueta, Jose Abreu, Epifanio de los Santos, and Rafael Palma. (Second row): Antonio Luna, Florentina Arellano, Rosa Sevilla, and Salvador del Rosario. (bottom): Fernando Ma. Guerrero, Joaquin Luna, and Cecilio Apóstol. El Renacimiento 1908, page 4 of the Year 8, Number 49 issue of the newspaper containing the infamous editorial "Aves de rapiña". Pedro Gil created a newspaper called Los Obreros dedicated to the laboring classes. He also edited La Nación. A street in Manila was named after him.

Newspapers in the Philippines include broadsheets Manila Bulletin, Philippine Daily Inquirer, and the Philippine Star, and tabloids Pilipino Star Ngayon, Bulgar, Abante, Balita, and Superbalita Cebu.

== Radio ==
Radio is introduced to the Philippines under the American colonial era. Radio in the Philippines started in 1922 with KZKZ (AM) in Manila by Henry Herman Sr., owner of the

Electrical Supply Company in Manila. Radio broadcasting is regulated by the National Telecommunications Commission (NTC), on content, frequency and licensing matters. There are about 1,000 radio stations in the Philippines, both on the AM and FM bands.

Broadcast radio stations in the Philippines are assigned four-letter call signs, containing the two-letter prefixes DW, DX, DY and DZ. The suffix usually indicates the island group the station is in (DW and DZ used for Luzon, DX for Mindanao and DY for the Visayas). The Philippines is one of the few Asian countries that use call signs for broadcast radio stations (the others being Indonesia, Japan, South Korea and Taiwan).

Radio networks are primarily owned by private broadcasters, some of the largest being the MBC Media Group, Radio Mindanao Network, Aliw Broadcasting Corporation, GMA Network and TV5 Network. The remainder fall under government broadcasters such as the Presidential Broadcast Service (PBS) and religious broadcasters such as the Catholic Media Network (CMN) and the Far East Broadcasting Company (FEBC). AM stations usually broadcast in news and talk formats; FM stations usually broadcast both local and foreign popular music, but has also seen usage by news/talk and community radio broadcasters especially in the provinces. Most radio stations broadcast in Tagalog and regional languages, and the rest in English.

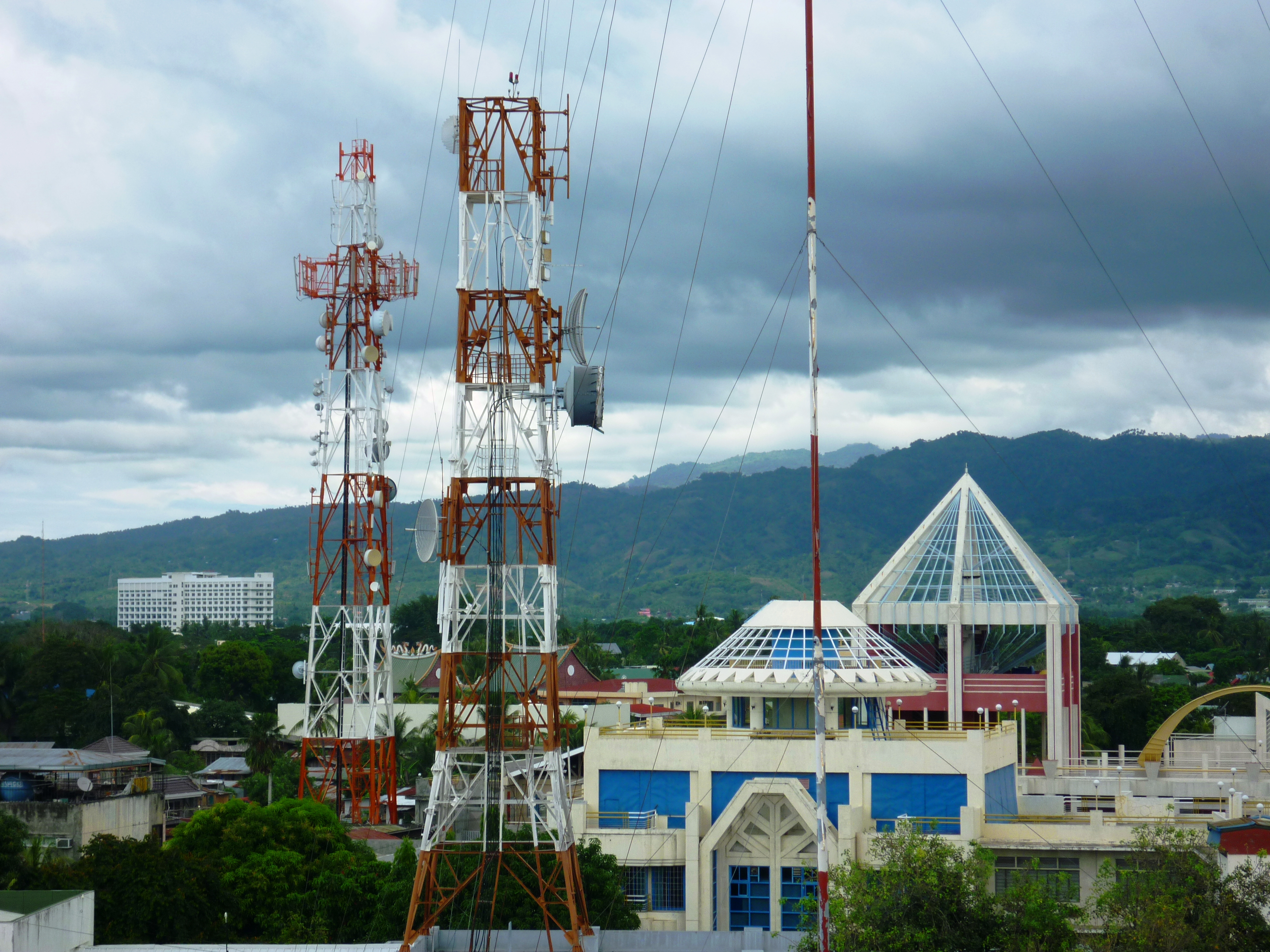
Communication towers in Zamboanga City

Government-owned radio broadcasting is primarily under the Presidential Broadcast Service (PBS), which operates a network of owned-and-operated news and talk stations in the AM and shortwave bands under the Radyo Pilipinas banner, as well as smaller community and information radio stations on both AM and FM bands, either as O&Os or through affiliates. Since 2017, PBS has also ventured into music broadcasting, with the top 40-formatted Republika FM1 and the adult contemporary-formatted Capital FM2, both located in Metro Manila. Other government agencies as well as local governments also operate their own radio stations.

The Philippines has not yet adopted a digital radio standard, but some stations in the larger cities have adopted North American HD Radio technology for digital broadcasting. Internet radio, in the form of live online audio streams of terrestrial radio stations and online-only stations, also has a presence, primarily aimed toward niche audiences and overseas Filipinos.

== Television ==
James Lindenberg known as The Father of Philippine television founded in 1946 Bolinao Electronics Corporation (BEC) (which is now ABS-CBN), while in the 1950s Robert La Rue Stewart also known as "Uncle Bob" founded Loreto F. de Hemedes Inc. later renamed Republic Broadcasting System Inc. (RBS) which is now GMA Network. In 1960 Joaquin Pardo Roces also known as "Don Chino Roces" founded Associated Broadcasting Corporation (ABC) which is now TV5, while Dick Baldwin also set up Inter-Island Broadcasting Corporation which is now Intercontinental Broadcasting Corporation (IBC) as well.

As with radio, the technicalities of television broadcasting are also regulated by the National Telecommunications Commission (NTC). Content regulation rests on the Movie and Television Review and Classification Board (MTRCB) except for political ads during campaign periods of which such has to have the Commission on Elections' approval. The majority of free-to-air TV networks are operated by private broadcasters, the largest by viewer share being All TV, A2Z, GMA Network and TV5. There are multiple government-owned networks, such as the Intercontinental Broadcasting Corporation (IBC), People's Television Network (PTV) and Radio Philippines Network (RPN), but these tend to be limited in scale and reach as far as conventional broadcasting is concerned. In the contemporary period, with the eventual improvement of internet access in the country over the years, most if not all of these TV channels have their corresponding live streaming avenues be it on the popular platform YouTube or Facebook Live among others, or their own such as iWant in the case of ABS-CBN. It has also become the norm to have the broadcast programs (episodes) to be publicly and freely available (Video on-demand) on such platforms, at least for some time.

Digital TV broadcasting in the Philippines was introduced in 2010, using the Japanese ISDB-T standard. Shutdown of analog TV transmissions is planned by the end of 2027, after being repeatedly rescheduled for over a decade since 2015.

== Media culture ==
Much media ownership is concentrated in the hands of prominent families and businesses. Consequently, some reports tend to be one-sided presentations favoring special interests. The privately owned press also tends toward sensationalism at times. State-owned media, according to media scholars, have been used for state propaganda and for discrediting dissenting voices, and exist alongside state-sponsored trolls tasked to amplify state propaganda.

While the media companies are predominantly owned by moneyed and influential tycoons, the Filipino readers are given the option with the advent of the new media and this has leveled the playing field. Online news publications or news portals, blog sites, and other online available resources have disrupted the readership of other giant news media companies.

The media companies have put up their respective online news portals during the late 90s to early 2000s, even before the advent of contemporary social media.

Alternative media outlets present in the Philippines include Tudla Productions, Southern Tagalog Exposure, Mayday Multimedia, Altermidya, and Bulatlat - these are often red-tagged.

== Freedom of the press ==
Freedom of speech and freedom of the press are enshrined in the 1987 Constitution. According to the Constitution, under Article XVI, Section 10, the State is obligated to "provide the policy environment for … the balanced flow of information into, out of, and across the country, in accordance with a policy that respects the freedom of speech and of the press." The Constitution also guarantees freedom of the press under Article III, Section 4. The Office of the President is responsible for managing the government's policy toward the press.

The Philippines is also a signatory to the United Nations International Covenant on Civil and Political Rights, which aims to protect freedom of expression and the freedom of the press.

The country launched the Philippine Plan of Action on the Safety of Journalists in 2019. The action plan aims to address the areas of integrity and professionalism, conducive working conditions, safety and protection mechanisms, criminal justice system, and public information, journalism education, and research.

Although independent observers credit the government with respecting freedom of the press in general, the government has been criticized for failing to investigate thoroughly summary killings of journalists and for subjecting journalists to harassment, red-tagging, and surveillance. In addition to killings, journalists in the Philippines have been victims of various forms of threats and attacks, including verbal assault and intimidation, physical assault, libel charges, arrests, and detentions. Journalists have also been blacklisted from covering public events. Attacks and threats may be carried out by state agents or private individuals. From July 2022 to April 2024, of these attacks, 50 were carried out by military, police, or other state agents, 28 by private individuals, and 27 by political figures.

=== Source protection ===
In August 2019, President Rodrigo Duterte signed a law expanding the Shield Law or Sotto Law; the new law expanded protection of journalists to include broadcast and online journalists from disclosing confidential sources of "any news item, report or information appearing or being reported or disseminated" unless the court or Congress "finds that such revelation is demanded by the security of the State".

=== Violence against journalists ===
The Philippines is among the most dangerous countries in the world according to various media watchdogs. The fifth annual Worldwide Press Freedom Index released by the international press freedom watchdog Reporters Without Borders (RSF) has placed the Philippines among the worst-ranked countries for 2006 at 142nd place. It indicated the continuing murders of journalists and increased legal harassment in the form of libel suits as part of the problem in the Philippines. Between 1986 and 2005, 52 journalists have been murdered and most of their killers go unpunished.

The Committee to Protect Journalists ranked the Philippines among the deadliest and most dangerous places for journalists. The Philippines was also ranked as the most dangerous country in Asia for journalists in 2018 according to the Philippine Center for Media Freedom and Responsibility, which tallied 85 attacks on the media in 2018 under President Rodrigo Duterte. In the first year of the Bongbong Marcos presidency, the National Union of Journalists of the Philippines (NUJP) reported that 3 journalists were killed, 2 were physically assaulted, and 21 were subject to harassment.

United Nations Special Rapporteur on freedom of opinion and expression Irene Khan in 2024 urged the government to do more to stop the killing of journalists in the Philippines. Khan described the killings as "most egregious form of censorship".

=== Libel and cyber libel ===
Libel and online libel are criminal offenses in the Philippines. Penalties for online libel include imprisonment for a maximum of 12 years and a fine of a maximum of ₱1,000,000. Since the American colonial period in the Philippines, libel laws have been used to stifle dissent. Media organizations contend that libel has been "used by people in power to harass journalists and muzzle critical reportage".

In 2006, International Federation of Journalists protested the "outrageous" number of libel suits Jose Miguel Arroyo, husband of President Gloria Arroyo, filed against 45 journalists, such as Malaya columnist Ellen Tordesillas and Newsbreak magazine editor-in-chief Marites Vitug. Jose Miguel Arroyo sued for libel after the journalists published investigative reports about his undeclared properties in the United States.

In 2007, police detained Newsbreak online editor Gemma Bagayaua after Ilocos Sur Governor Chavit Singson filed a libel suit against Bagayaua, after Newsbreak came out with a story on Singson's assets as well as his influence on the administration of President Gloria Arroyo. Arrest warrants were also served to four other Newsbreak journalists: Vitug, Maan Hontiveros, Lala Rimando, and Aries Rufo. Members of the NUJP lit candles to protest Bagayaua's arrest, while the Committee to Protect Journalists described the libel suit as a "battering ram against press freedom".

From July 2016 to April 2021, there were 37 cases of libel and oral defamation recorded. Eighteen of these were online libel, while 8 of the 37 cases also led to arrests of journalists. There was a rise in libel and cyber libel cases in the country in 2020, according to the NUJP. Rappler CEO Maria Ressa was among those convicted of cyber libel in a 2020 case involving the retroactive application of a then new cybercrime law to an article that had been published years before.

==== Proposed decriminalization of libel ====
In the 14th, 15th, and 18th Congress, Rep. Satur Ocampo filed bills seeking to decriminalize libel. In the 19th Congress, Rep. France Castro of the Alliance of Concerned Teachers party list filed House Bill 569, which aimed to decriminalize libel. Castro said the criminalization of libel has "caused the gagging of media practitioners, the concealment of the truth from public knowledge, prior restraint and chilling effect, and the resulting incapacitation of the people from gaining a meaningful understanding of the various public issues that are of paramount concern". In the Philippine Senate, Senator Risa Hontiveros filed Senate Bill 1593 or the Decriminalization of Libel Act, stating that "Our libel laws have been weaponized to stifle very basic fundamental rights." She also said the large number of libel cases have led to the congestion of court dockets.

The Philippine Commission on Human Rights supports the decriminalization of libel, citing concerns on libel laws being used to suppress freedom of the press. Media watchdogs have called on Congress to decriminalize libel and cyber libel, with the NUJP noting how these are "commonly used weapons against independent journalism." Makabayan lawmakers and United Nations Special Rapporteur Irene Khan have also called for the decriminalization of libel. Former Congress Representative Walden Bello filed a petition asking the Supreme Court to decriminalize libel.

=== Red-tagging ===
Journalists have been subjected to red-tagging and other forms of harassment, such as surveillance, doxing, and extortion. Red-tagging endangers journalists and makes them vulnerable to violence and to being jailed on trumped up charges, such as illegal possession of firearms. Media organizations and journalists have also been subjected to vilification and various forms of intimidation.

Government agencies, such as the National Task Force to End Local Communist Armed Conflict chaired by the President of the Philippines, have used red-tagging against journalists. From June 2016 to April 2021, there were 51 cases of intimidation of journalists, including 30 cases of red-tagging. From July 2022 of July 2023, in the first year of the Bongbong Marcos presidency, the NUJP recorded 17 cases of red-tagging against journalists in the Philippines.

In December 2024, a Quezon City Regional Trial Court ordered SMNI TV hosts Lorraine Badoy-Partosa and Jeffrey Celiz to pay damages of ₱2.08 million for red-tagging journalist Atom Araullo, to compensate for the effect of "red-tagging and its effects on his personal life and career as a journalist". The court order was the first application of the May 2024 Supreme Court ruling that defined red-tagging as a threat to a person's right to life, liberty, and security.

=== Various forms of judicial harassment ===
The Department of Justice filed five cases in Philippine courts against Rappler, which publishes articles critical of the Philippine government. The filing of cases has been seen as part of efforts to intimidate, threaten, and ultimately shut down the website. Then-President Rodrigo Duterte also threatened to shut down over alleged tax liabilities the Philippine Daily Inquirer, which published reports critical of the Philippine government's war on drugs.

In 2020, Tacloban-based journalist Frenchie Mae Cumpio was arrested and detained on charges of terrorism financing and illegal possession of firearms. United Nations Special Rapporteur Irene Khan stated in 2024 that the charges against Cumpio came after months of red-tagging, surveillance, intimidation, and harassment, and appears to have been done in retaliation to her coverage of alleged human rights abuses by the police and the military. Community journalists Anne Krueger from Bacolod and Lady Ann Salem from Metro Manila were arrested in 2019 and 2020 respectively under similar circumstances.

=== Shutdown of media outlets ===
Media watchdogs such as Reporters Without Borders, the Center for Media Freedom and Responsibility, Amnesty International, the Photojournalists' Center of the Philippines (PCP), Foreign Correspondents Association of the Philippines (FOCAP), and the Consortium on Democracy and Disinformation (D&D) have noted that various forms of attacks against the press have increased since the Duterte administration came to power in 2016 – with the Philippine Daily Inquirer, news website Rappler, nonprofit media organizations like Vera Files and the Philippine Center for Investigative Journalism, and ABS-CBN being particular targets because of coverage critical of the administration.

Many of these media watchdogs have issued statements placing the ABS-CBN broadcast stoppage in the context of systemic attacks against press freedom in the Philippines. Media groups and people's organizations denounced the shutdown order for being a loss of democracy, freedom of expression, and freedom of the press.

Some groups also placed the matter in the context of attacks and harassment aimed at those that criticize the government and compared it to the takeover of media outlets during martial law under Ferdinand Marcos, as well as to pressure to shutdown media outlets under different administrations. For example, under President Joseph Estrada, The Manila Times was threatened with libel and closure, resulting in the newspaper's eventual sale from the Gokongwei family to Dante Ang, a crony of Estrada; while the Philippine Daily Inquirer was subjected to an advertising boycott. Both newspapers ran stories critical of Estrada.

=== Suppression of press freedom during the Marcos dictatorship (1972-1986) ===
Before the declaration of martial law in September 1972, mass media in the Philippines functioned as a government watchdog and source of information for citizens. Marcos exerted considerable effort to stifle the free press, which is considered a key feature of a functioning democracy. He shut down media outlets and set up print and broadcast outlets that he controlled through his cronies. In doing so, he silenced public criticism and opposition by controlling information that the people had access to. This allowed him to have the final say on what passed as truth.

By controlling the press, the dictatorship was able to suppress negative news and create an exaggerated perception of progress.

=== Disinformation and misinformation ===
Fake news in the Philippines refers to the general and widespread misinformation or disinformation in the country by various actors. The term is a misnomer because "news" is defined as the "accurate and timely reporting of events, ideas and issues." However, the term "fake news" has been popularized by those who seek to undermine trust in media. It has been problematic in the Philippines where social media and alike plays a key role in influencing topics and information ranging from politics, health, belief, religion, current events, aid, lifestyle, elections and others. The 2025 Reuter's Institute Digital News Report found that 67% of Filipinos believed the spread of disinformation as a serious problem. This point of view comes in the wake of widespread disinformation regarding the COVID-19 pandemic in the Philippines and the 2022 and 2025 Philippine general elections.

=== Media education ===
The University of the Philippines (UP) offered a journalism class as part of a curriculum designed by Walter Robb Wilgus beginning in 1919, though it was short-lived. Student publications included the College Folio (1910–1913), Varsity News (1917–1922), and the Philippine Collegian, established in 1922.

At the University of Santo Tomas (UST), undergraduate journalism education was established during academic year 1928–1929 in the Faculty of Philosophy and Letters. Its development followed the establishment of The Varsitarian, the university's student newspaper, on January 16, 1928. The first graduates completed the program in 1933. Journalism instruction combined academic coursework with exposure to professional practice, with working journalists serving in the faculty and campus papers providing students with experience in reporting, editing and newspaper production.

Philippine universities later established programs in broadcasting, advertising, public relations and other forms of media. The University of the Philippines established its Institute of Mass Communication in 1965, later elevated to the College of Mass Communication (renamed College of Media and Communication in 2025). Journalism and communication programs have since become established fields of study in Philippine higher education.

== See also ==
- Philippine cinema
- Kapisanan ng mga Brodkaster ng Pilipinas
