= Tsek.ph =

Philippine fact-checking website

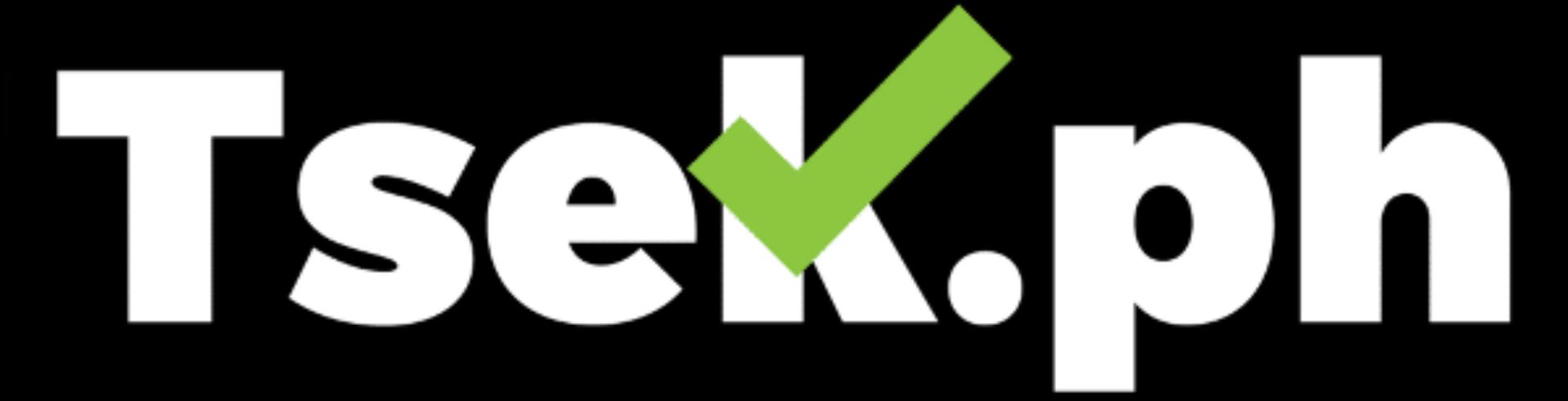
- Founded: February 11, 2019
- Headquarters: {{{location_country}}}
- Owner: University of the Philippines
- Parent: Office of the Vice President for Public Affairs, University of the Philippines
- Website: tsek.ph
- Launched: 2019

Tsek.ph is a Philippine collaborative fact-checking website launched in 2019 by the University of the Philippines to combat disinformation and provide verified information during election periods. It is a collaborative project uniting academic, media, and civil society partners to fact-check statements by public figures, government agencies, and election-related posts on social media.

== History ==
In 2019, the University of the Philippines launched Tsek.ph to address the spread of disinformation. The project operates under the university's Office of the Vice President for Public Affairs and is spearheaded by the Department of Journalism at the College of Mass Communication.

The website first brought together three academic institutions and eleven media organizations for the 2019 Philippine elections. It was relaunched for the 2022 elections with expanded membership from academia, media, and civil society. In 2025, it was relaunched again ahead of the midterm elections with participation from 34 institutions and initiatives.

== Activities ==
Tsek.ph collects and shares fact-checks from its partner organizations and sorts each claim into one of five categories: accurate, false, misleading, no basis, and needs context. It checks statements from candidates, campaign promises, and other election-related posts from public figures, government agencies, and social media.

The website also posts weekly summaries and quizzes that cover the main stories from the fact-checks. It follows the Code of Principles of the International Fact-Checking Network for transparency in sources, funding, and methodology. The coordinators of Tsek.ph say the project works to improve media literacy and help voters stay well-informed.

During the 2022 presidential elections, Tsek.ph found that most false or misleading posts supporting Bongbong Marcos, whereas disinformation aimed at Leni Robredo was largely critical. From November 2021 to February 2022, Tsek.ph identified 58 claims about martial law, addressing false narratives and correcting misleading information.

The Library of Congress added Tsek.ph to the Philippine General Election 2022 Web Archive to preserve important digital records for research and future use. Baybars Orsek, director of the International Fact-Checking Network, said the website's relaunch is a useful tool for holding people accountable and giving the public reliable information.

== Partners ==
Partners include academic institutions, media organizations, and civil society groups. Notable participants are University of the Philippines campuses, University of Santo Tomas, Asian Center for Journalism at Ateneo de Manila University, Colegio de San Juan de Letran, Trinity University of Asia, ABS-CBN News, Agence France-Presse, DZUP, Interaksyon, MindaNews, The Philippine Star, PressOne.PH and Vera Files.
