= PressOne.PH =

Philippine online news organization

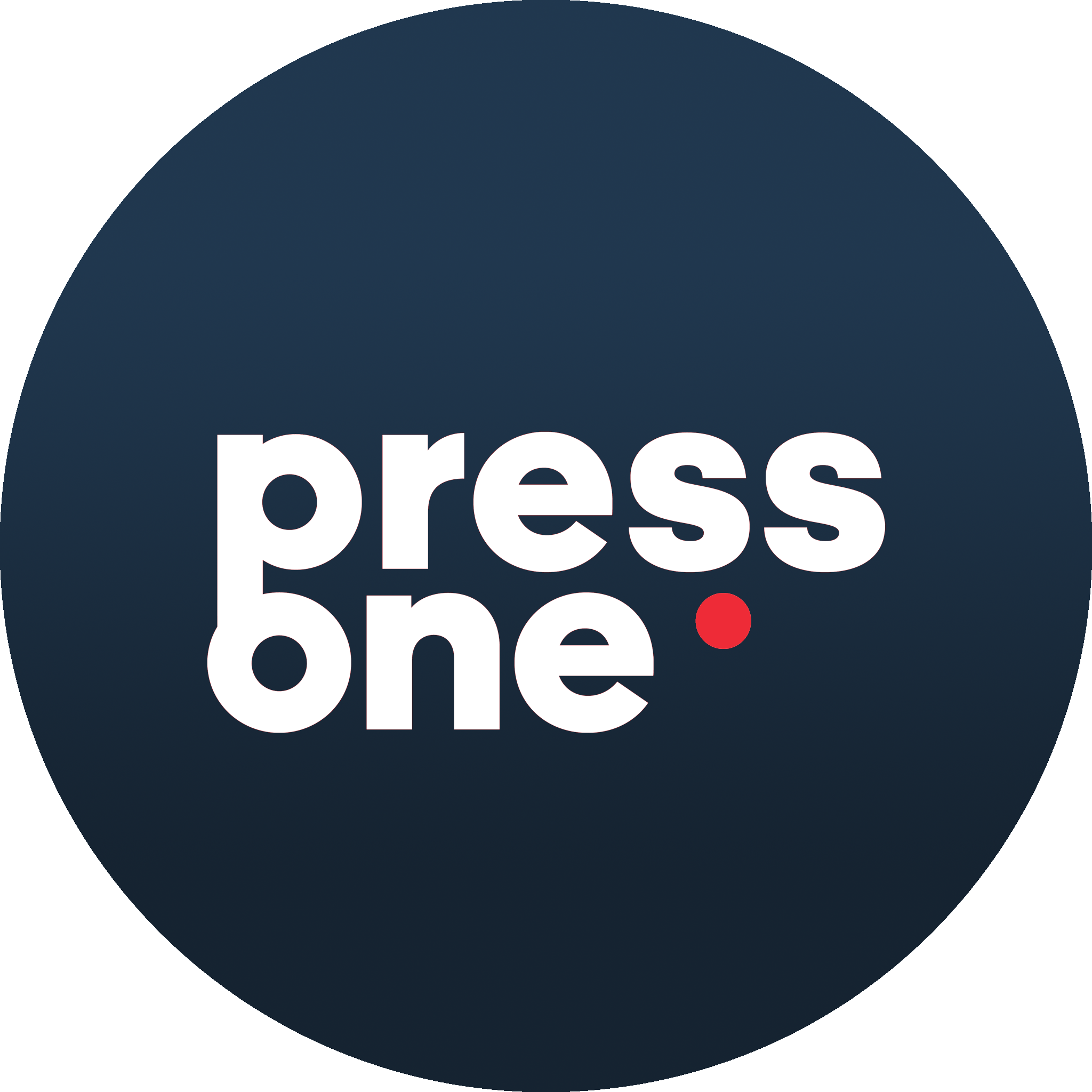
- Website type: News and fact-checking website
- Available in: English, Filipino
- Headquarters: Manila, Philippines
- Owners: PressOnePH News and Information Service Inc.
- Editor: Felipe F. Salvosa II
- Website: pressone.ph
- Launched: 2019; 7 years ago
- Current status: Active

PressOne.PH is a Philippine online news organization and fact-checking outlet based in Manila. It publishes news, commentary, fact-checks and investigations, including reporting on misinformation, disinformation and influence operations.

PressOne.PH participated in the Philippine Fact-Checker Incubator, a program organized by media nonprofit Internews ahead of the 2022 Philippine general election. It became a verified signatory of the International Fact-Checking Network (IFCN) Code of Principles in March 2023.

Its investigations into suspected foreign information operations have been cited by the National Task Force for the West Philippine Sea and presented to the House of Representatives.

== History ==
PressOne.PH was established in 2019 as an online news and information website covering Philippine affairs. Journalist Felipe F. Salvosa II joined the organization as editor in July 2019, while 2018 Pulitzer Prize co-recipient Manuel Mogato joined as editor-at-large.

PressOne.PH established its fact-checking operation in 2021. It was among the news organizations selected for the Philippine Fact-Checker Incubator, an Internews program that provided training, technical and financial support, and mentorship to Philippine news organizations developing fact-checking operations. The program supported organizations in applying for verification under the IFCN Code of Principles. In March 2023, PressOne.PH became an IFCN verified signatory. Its fact-checking focused principally on political claims and online hoaxes.

== Fact-checking ==
PressOne.PH fact-checks verifiable statements made by public figures as well as claims circulating on digital platforms. Its published methodology states that claims are selected according to factors including their significance, the prominence of the person making the claim, their circulation on social media and their potential to reach a wider audience.

Its fact-checks use a rating system that includes False, Altered, Missing Context and True. The organization's methodology requires fact-checks to undergo editorial review before publication and calls for the use of primary sources where available.

PressOne.PH is part of Tsek.ph, a collaborative Philippine fact-checking initiative involving news organizations and academic institutions.

It is indexed in the global fact-checking database maintained by the Duke University Reporters' Lab.

=== Foreign information operations investigations ===
PressOne.PH's investigations have examined coordinated social media activity involving Philippine politics and the West Philippine Sea. In March 2024, PressOne.PH reported on the social media activities of Media Unlocked, a channel operated by journalists from the Chinese state-owned newspaper China Daily, including its dissemination of pro-Beijing narratives concerning the West Philippine Sea. China Daily subsequently responded to the reporting, disputing PressOne.PH's characterization of Media Unlocked and questioning the outlet's independence because of funding it had received from Internews. Media Unlocked's TikTok account was taken down the following month; PressOne.PH reported that the reason for the removal was unclear.

A 2025 semi-annual report of the National Task Force for the West Philippine Sea cited a PressOne.PH investigation that identified 107 suspicious accounts on X that systematically published content supporting Vice President Sara Duterte, attacking President Bongbong Marcos, and promoting narratives against Philippine claims in the West Philippine Sea.

PressOne.PH presented findings from its investigations before a House of Representatives tri-committee investigating online disinformation in February 2025. The Philippine Daily Inquirer reported that PressOne.PH had identified 107 X accounts with Chinese names that amplified pro-Duterte content and criticism of the Marcos administration. GMA News and Manila Bulletin reported its findings concerning accounts that also promoted narratives involving the West Philippine Sea.

The House committee's subsequent report recorded PressOne.PH's disclosure that it had identified China-linked websites that sought to undermine President Marcos's credibility while others promoted other Philippine politicians and candidates.

== See also ==
- Fact-checking
- International Fact-Checking Network
- Tsek.ph
- Media of the Philippines
