= Nix Nolledo =

Filipino entrepreneur

Nico Jose “Nix” Nolledo
- Occupations: Entrepreneur, Investor, Speaker
- Known for: Board Member of Rappler Chairman of Xurpas, CEO of ODX Pte. Ltd.

Nico Jose “Nix” Nolledo is a Filipino digital entrepreneur and co-founder of Xurpas, a mobile content provider company. He also worked for Rappler, the Founding Director of the Internet and Mobile Marketing Association of Philippines and Digital Commerce Association of Philippines (IMAAPDCP). He is currently the chief executive officer of Open Data Exchange (ODX) Pte. Ltd & the chairman of Xurpas, Inc.

== Early life ==
Nolledo has a degree of Bachelor of Science in Management from Ateneo de Manila University. Initially, he worked as an Assistant Branch Manager in a Philippine branch of KFC.

== Business ventures ==
In 1999, Nolledo established PinoyExchange.com with the help of his brother in 1999 as an online community where people can connect and discuss on the basis of their area of interest. In 2001, he founded Xurpas to bring opportunities for mobile content developers. The company's IPO of P1.36 billion was the most successful and only consumer tech listing in South East Asia at that time.

== Investments ==
Nolledo is an angel investor in various technology companies and has served on the boards of companies such as Rappler.com, Gurango Software, PurpleClick, Pawnhero and MyRegalo.com.

== Awards and recognitions ==
Nolledo was recognized as EY's Philippine Entrepreneur of the Year in 2015, Endeavor Entrepreneur in 2015, and was chosen as the Outstanding Young Men (TOYM) in the Philippines for 2015.
