= AVIS Viswanathan =

Avis Viswanathan (born November 5, 1967) commonly known as the "happynesswala", is a life coach, a speaker, a happiness curator, author, and organizational transformation consultant. He leads change management, culture and leadership development mandates in the corporate sector. He co-founded, and is the principal consultant, at A V Initiatives, a specialist consulting firm that inspires workplace happiness.

== Early life and career ==
Viswanathan was born in Chennai, India. He studied at the PSBB Senior Secondary School, Delhi Public School, and at Nutan Vidyalaya (Gulbarga, Karnataka) before pursuing physics at Sree Narayana College, Kollam, at Kerala University. He is married to Vaani Anand, and has a son, Aashirwad, and a daughter, Aanchal.

Viswanathan worked for ten years as an investigative, political and business journalist in India. He worked with The Indian Express, India Today, Business World and Business Today. He quit business journalism to join entrepreneur, C. Sivasankaran as his executive assistant in 1995. In 1996, he moved from Bengaluru to Chennai to start his own business.

In 1996, Viswanathan set up imagequity+ with his wife, Anand, Asia's first reputation management consulting firm, based out of Chennai. The firm went bankrupt in at the end of 2007.

While still in bankruptcy, Viswanathan and Anand founded A V Initiatives, a consulting firm specializing in workplace happiness. The company trains managers to be happy despite their circumstances.

== Books ==
Viswanathan wrote a book, Fall like a Rose Petal, published by Westland in 2015. The book is written in an epistolary style, as letters from a father to his children, narrating the incidents and learning from his journey.

== Public speaking ==
Viswanathan is also motivational speaker. He was ranked among the Top Ten Motivational Speakers in India by The Week magazine. He curates four events centered around inspiring happiness. As of April 2019, Viswanathan had anchored and hosted 100 curated, live, reflective conversations. These 100 conversations have been completed between January 2015 and April 2019.

- The Bliss Catchers is inspired by Joseph Campbell’s awakening, ‘Follow Your Bliss’ philosophy. The event is a live conversation each month between Viswanathan and invited guests. The Bliss Catchers began in January 2015 and is hosted by Odyssey Bookstore, Chennai.
- The Uncommon Leader, looks at extraordinary entrepreneurship and leadership lessons that can be learned from exceptional people. It is held once every two months.
- 'The Happiness Conversations' is a live, reflective, non-commercial Conversation Series that champions Living Life Fully With What Is. Through exploring the lived experiences of invited guests, it inspires people to be happy despite their circumstances. While celebrating imperfection and impermanence, it invites people to embrace their life for the way it is and implores them to never postpone happiness. The underlying theme of the series is that life can, and must be, faced stoically – regardless of your current situation. This series, curated by the Happynesswalas, Anand and Viswanathan, is sponsored and hosted by the Odyssey Bookstore in Adyar.
- The Artist's Soul is a series of 90-minute conversations curated at Wandering Artist on the lived experiences and expressions of artists.
- Viswanathan delivers his ‘Fall Like A Rose Petal’ talk to audiences. He shares how he and his family braved fear and pennilessness to discover a higher purpose in life.
