= Chit Estella =

Filipino journalist and professor (1957–2011)

Chit Estella-Simbulan
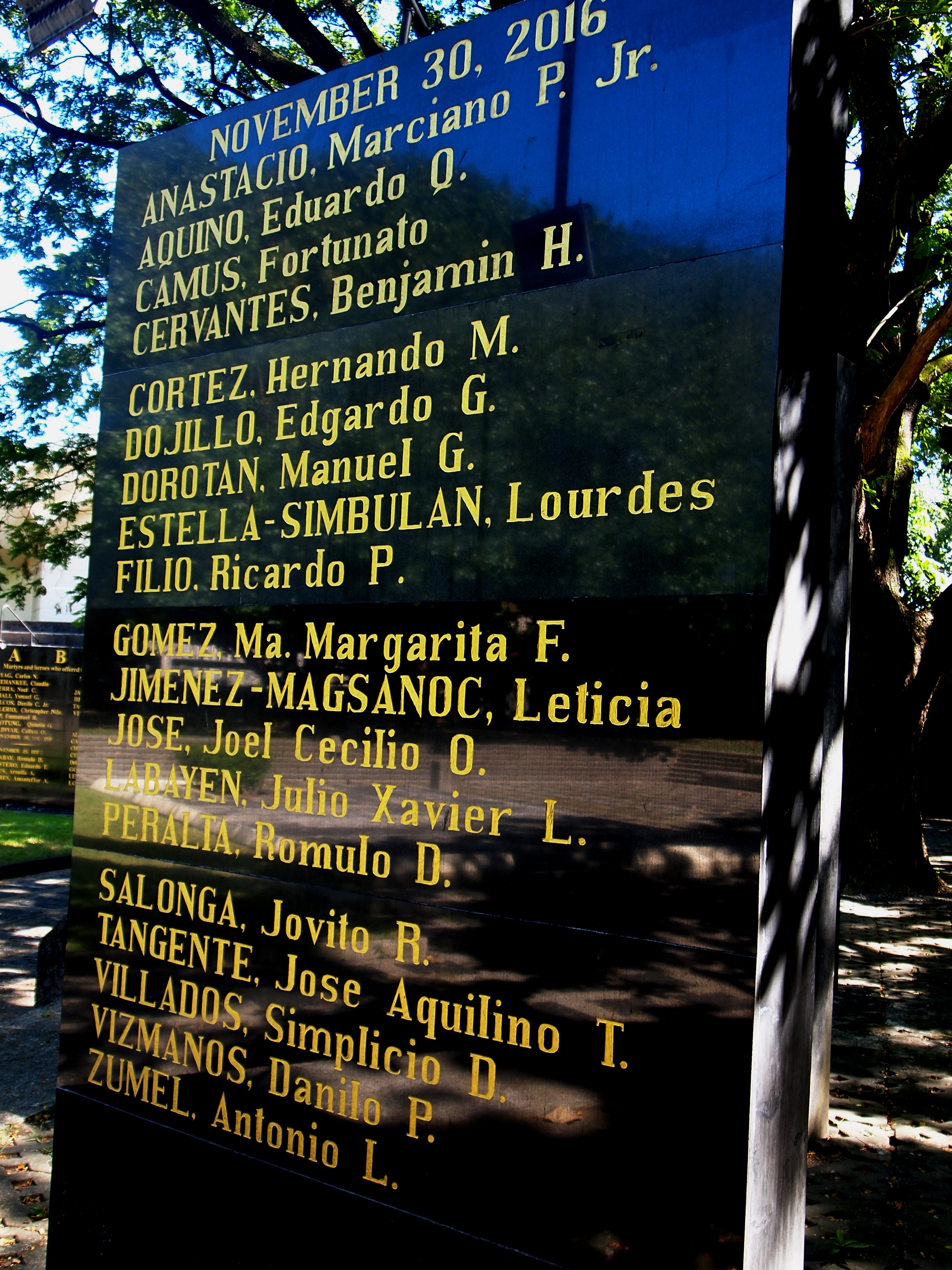
- Detail of the Wall of Remembrance at the Bantayog ng mga Bayani, showing names from the 2016 batch of Bantayog Honorees, including that of Chit Estella.
- Born: Lourdes Panganiban Estella; August 19, 1957; Quezon City, Philippines
- Died: May 13, 2011 (aged 53); Quezon City, Philippines
- Resting place: San Agustin Church, Intramuros, Manila, Philippines
- Education: University of the Philippines Diliman (BA)
- Occupation: Journalist
- Spouse: Ronald Simbulan
- Awards: Honored at the Bantayog ng mga Bayani Wall of Remembrance

Lourdes "Chit" Panganiban Estella-Simbulan (August 19, 1957 – May 13, 2011) was a Filipino journalist and professor, known for her critical writings on government repression, abuse, corruption and human rights violations.

Estella-Simbulan is particularly known for having been instrumental in the founding of the Philippine Center for Investigative Journalism and of Vera Files, two of the Philippines' most prominent independent investigative journalism organizations; and for being editor-in-chief of the Pinoy Times, a tabloid whose exposés played a role in the ouster of Philippine President Joseph Estrada.

In recognition of her early work, as a journalist during the Philippines' Martial Law period under Ferdinand Marcos, Estella-Simbulan's name was one of 19 added in November 2016 to the inscriptions on the Bantayog ng mga Bayani (Monument of the Heroes) Memorial Wall, which is dedicated to individuals who "defied risks and dedicated their life for the cause of truth, justice, peace and freedom for the Filipino people" during the Marcos regime.

== Education and personal life ==
Estella-Simbulan was born in Quezon City to Elijio Edarad Estella and Antonia Mapala Panganiban. She finished her primary and secondary schooling at St. Joseph's College, and studied AB Journalism at the University of the Philippines Diliman. She pursued graduate studies at the Open University of the University of the Philippines, with a Master in Public Management.

She was married to Roland Simbulan, an author, professor and long-time advocate against nuclear power.

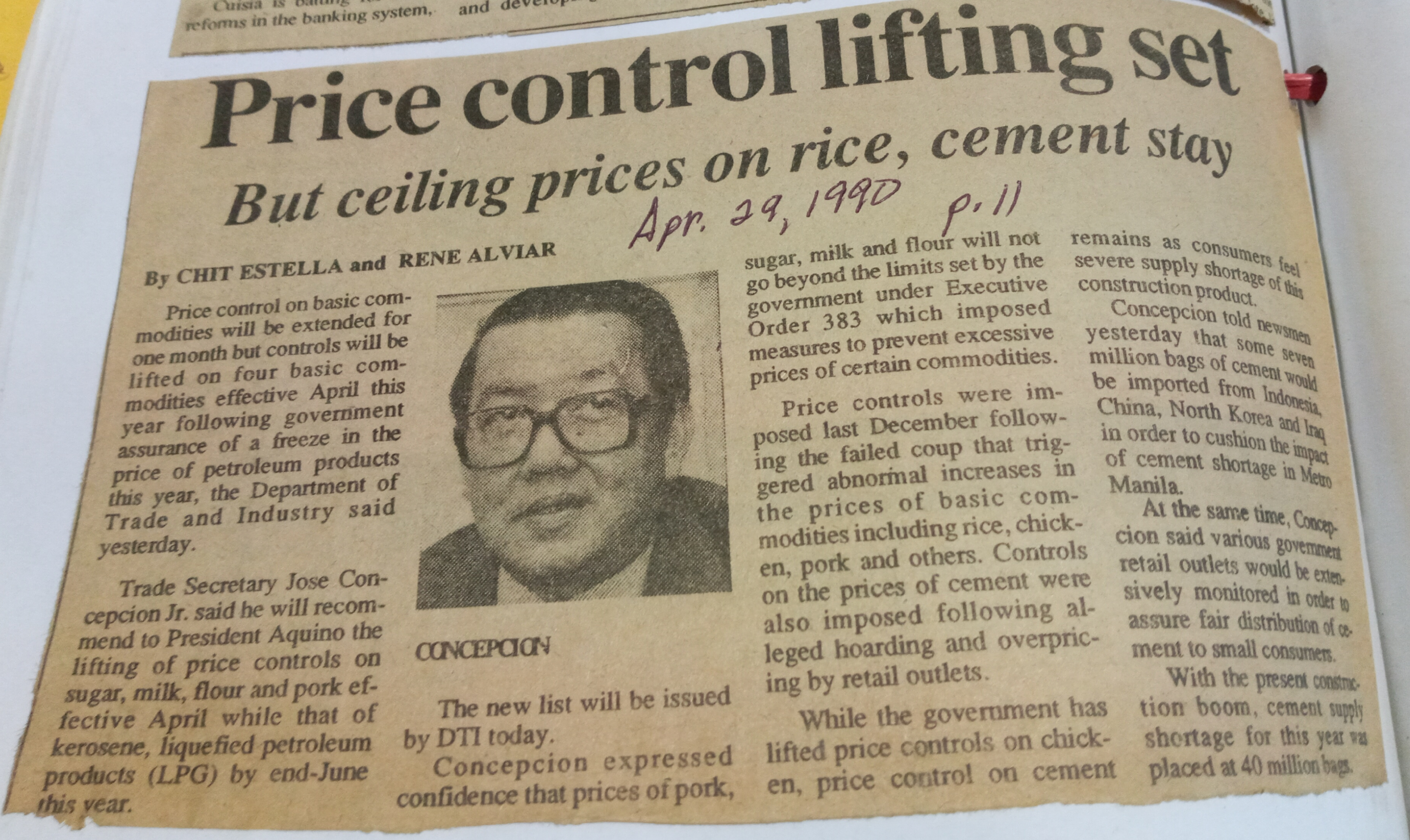
Chit Estella and Rene Alviar bylines in an April 29, 1990 issue of Malaya.

== Journalism career ==
Estella was studying journalism at the University of the Philippines during the beginnings of the Martial Law era. In her sophomore year, she began writing for the school newspaper, the Philippine Collegian. The paper was previously ordered to be discontinued upon the declaration of martial law, but the university population persisted to have it revived. In 1974, the Philippine Collegian was re-established. It covered social happenings in the repressive government under Martial Law, and had a staff with strong editorial stances. Estella wrote for the newspaper's current events section, and investigated events that exposed government suppression of truth, corruption, and human rights abuses. In 1975 she also worked at Liwayway Press in Santa Cruz, Manila, where she covered news events. In her senior year, Estella was elected president of the UP Journalism Club.

She wrote for several underground resistance press, such as the Balita ng Malayang Pilipinas (BMP), Taliba ng Bayan, and the Liberation, disguised under the nom de guerre "Ka Sandy". Along with other college writers, she would skip classes to pursue assignments for these publications. Her work in the press became significant sources for the Filipino public who were looking for independent opinion and real, objective news.

After she graduated in 1979, it became difficult to find employment in Marcos crony-controlled publications. With her background of press coverage concerning human rights, protests and social action, she was continually rejected. She later wrote articles for anti-dictatorship groups, such as the National Secretariat for Social Action (NASSA) of the Catholic Bishops' Conference of the Philippines (CBCP). She was almost arrested on one occasion in 1982. Estella became a reporter for the Manila Evening Post and Tempo, before she joined Ang Pahayagang Malaya, an independent newspaper where she covered news at the Malacañan.

She became managing editor of the Manila Times in the mid-1990s, and became editor-in-chief of Pinoy Times in 1999, a tabloid in Filipino notable for its criticisms of then President Joseph Estrada. A libel suit filed by Estrada against the Manila Times forced the paper to issue a front-page apology, which led Estella and fellow editors Booma Cruz, Joel Gaborni, and Ed Lingao to resign in protest.

She also wrote for Mr. & Ms. and the Philippine Daily Inquirer, and helped establish the Philippine Center for Investigative Journalism (PCIJ) and Vera Files. She also edited the Philippine Journalism Review, a publication for the Center for Media Freedom and Responsibility. In 2001, she returned to her alma mater UP Diliman to teach at the College of Mass Communication.

== Death ==
On May 13, 2011, two passenger buses crashed into a taxi she was riding along Commonwealth Avenue in Quezon City, which caused her sudden death. Her remains were subsequently cremated and interred at the San Agustin Church in Manila.

In 2024, the drivers of the two buses that collided with Estella's taxi were convicted of reckless imprudence resulting in damage to property with homicide and sentenced to two years' imprisonment.

== Legacy ==
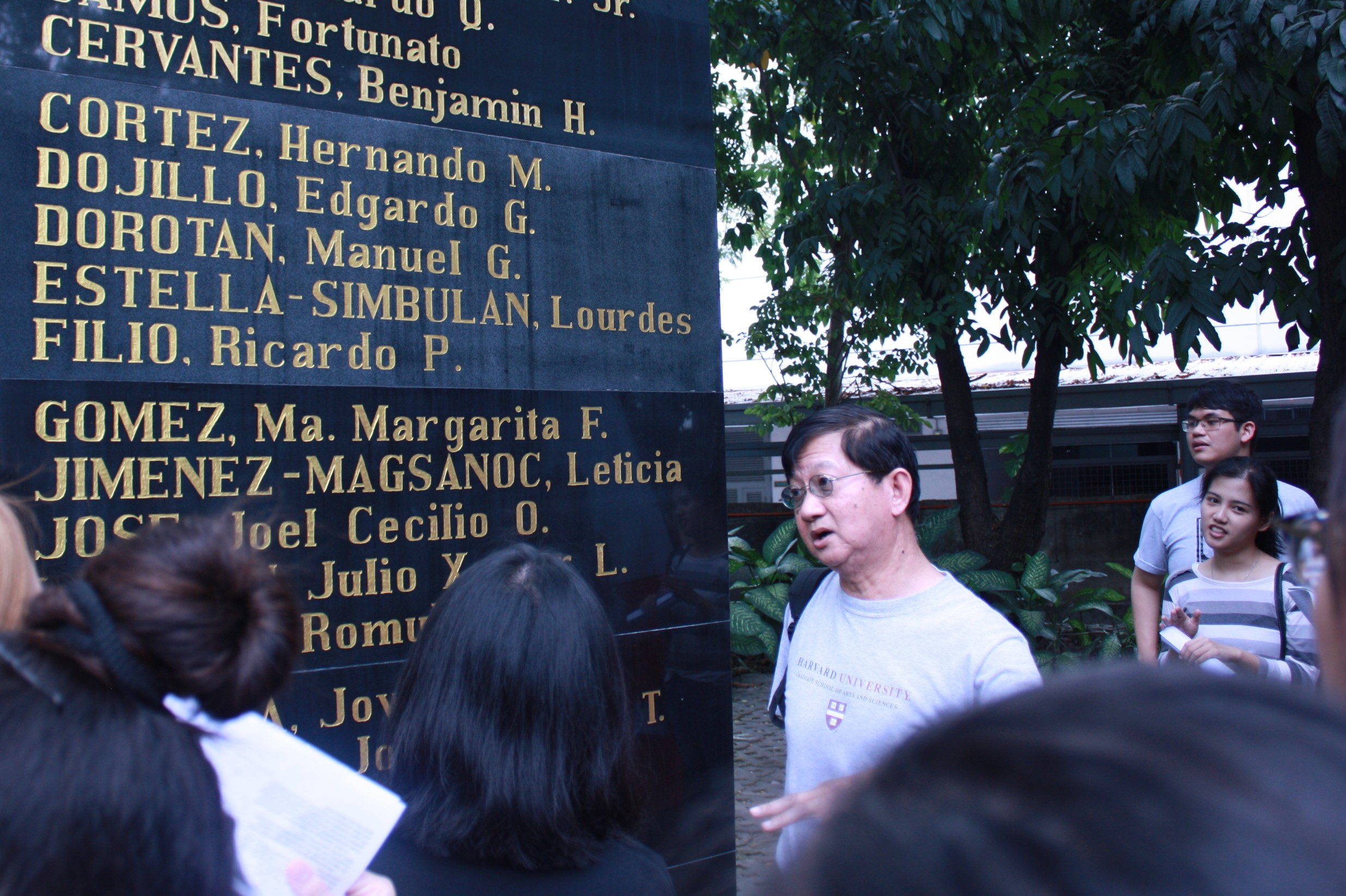
University of the Philippines Professor Roland Simbulan, speaking to students about his wife Chit Estella Simbulan, who is honored on the wall of remembrance at the Bantayog ng mga Bayani, just before the Annual Honoring of Martyrs and Heroes on 30 November 2018.

In 2012, the first Chit Estella Journalism Awards and Memorial Lectures was established, which aims to honor significant journalism on human rights, both in print and online publications. The first lecture was about the human rights situation in the Philippines, delivered by Satur Ocampo, who is a veteran journalist, former political prisoner and representative in Congress.

In 2015, Vera Files launched the Chit Estella Road Safety Journalism Award, as a special category in the Philippine Journalism Research Conference (PJRC). It expands her current Memorial Awards for Journalism, this time to be awarded to Journalism or Communication students with outstanding research papers or reports on road safety.

In recognition of her early work, as a journalist during the Philippines' Martial Law period under Ferdinand Marcos, Estella-Simbulan's name was one of 19 added in November 2016 to the inscriptions on the Bantayog ng mga Bayani (Monument of the Heroes) Memorial Wall, which is dedicated to individuals who "defied risks and dedicated their life for the cause of truth, justice, peace and freedom for the Filipino people" during the Marcos regime.

== See also ==
- University of the Philippines College of Mass Communication
- History of the Philippines (1965–1986)
