= Tony Nieva =

Filipino journalist, union organizer and activist

- Born: Antonio Maria Onrubia Nieva; September 21, 1944; Zamboanga, Zamboanga, Commonwealth of the Philippines
- Died: October 13, 1997 (aged 53); Prague, Czech Republic
- Occupation: Journalist

Antonio Maria "Tony" Onrubia Nieva (September 21, 1944 – October 13, 1997) was a Filipino journalist, union organizer, and activist. He worked to defend press freedom and the rights of workers, and campaigned to end authoritarian rule in the Philippines. He led the National Press Club as president and founded the National Union of Journalists of the Philippines. He was secretary general of the International Organization of Journalists based in Prague, Czech Republic, from 1995 up to the time of his death in 1997. His name is on the Bantayog ng mga Bayani Wall of Remembrance, for his contributions to the fight against injustices of the dictatorship under President Ferdinand E. Marcos.

== Biography ==
=== As writer and editor ===
Tony Nieva was a journalist who worked at the Philippines Herald, Manila Bulletin, and the Philippine Daily Inquirer. He worked as a columnist at the Bulletin, where he later became a desk editor. His column for the Inquirer appeared alternately with that of Letty Jimenez Magsanoc. He published a magazine for workers called Bagwis.

He was also a poet and short story writer who won first prize in the first Asiaweek Short Story Contest in 1981.

=== As organizer ===
Nieva headed the union at the Manila Bulletin for two terms and helped workers in other media organizations form their own union. He led the National Press Club of the Philippines as president for two terms and organized "Save the Press" marches in Manila in a campaign for press freedom in the Philippines.

In 1972, when he learned that martial law had been declared, he ran to the National Press Club building to warn its officers Antonio Zumel and Eddie Monteclaro, so they could escape the first wave of arrests.

In 1983, Nieva was arrested and detained for his work as a union organizer following a military raid on his home in Malate, Manila.

As president of the National Press Club from 1984 to 1986, the organization's office became "a refuge and haven for harassed journalists who needed protection from the dictatorship." Under his leadership, the National Press Club, with the Women's Committee to Protect Writers, published the two-volume The Philippine Press Under Siege, which collected essays by journalists who were threatened or detained during the rule of Marcos.

In 1986, he helped organize the People's Movement for Press Freedom. He continued his work as organizer even after Marcos had fled the Philippines in 1986. He founded and headed the National Union of Journalists of the Philippines and helped establish the Kapisanan ng mga Manggagawa sa Media ng Pilipinas, an organization for media workers and practitioners.

From 1995 up to his death, he was secretary general of the International Organization of Journalists based in Prague, Czech Republic. He died of natural causes in Prague on October 13, 1997.

=== Campaign for the release of publisher Joe Burgos ===
Nieva led a campaign for the release of publisher Jose "Joe" Burgos Jr. and other journalists from the independent newspaper We Forum. We Forum, which published articles critical of the government, was raided and shut down in December 1982. The Supreme Court of the Philippines, in what was considered a "landmark decision," overturned the Philippine government's case against Burgos and declared the raid on We Forum and the arrest of its journalists illegal.

=== Escape of journalist Satur Ocampo ===
In 1985, Nieva, as president of the National Press Club, played a key role in the escape of journalist Satur Ocampo, who had been detained by the military for nine years and tortured. Under Nieva's leadership, the National Press Club had granted lifetime membership to Ocampo, giving him rights to participate in its elections. Marcos and then defense secretary Juan Ponce Enrile gave their permission for Ocampo to attend the organization's annual election of officers. Ocampo went to the National Press Club building on election day on May 5, 1985, escorted by 12 armed guards. He then cast his vote and left the building through the back exit.

== Legacy ==
Nieva's name was added to the Bantayog ng mga Bayani Wall of Remembrance on November 30, 2017, for his contributions to the fight against the injustices of the dictatorship under President Ferdinand E. Marcos. The recognition came in the same year as that of 10 others, including activist-priest Joe Dizon, businessman and diplomat Alfonso Yuchengco, and tribesmen Lumbaya Gayudan and Tayab Arthur Aboli, who led their fellow Kalingas to oppose the construction of the Chico River Dam after the murder of their leader Macli-ing Dulag.

== See also ==
- Bantayog ng mga Bayani
- International Organization of Journalists
