= Marites D. Vitug =

Filipina journalist and author

Marites Vitug
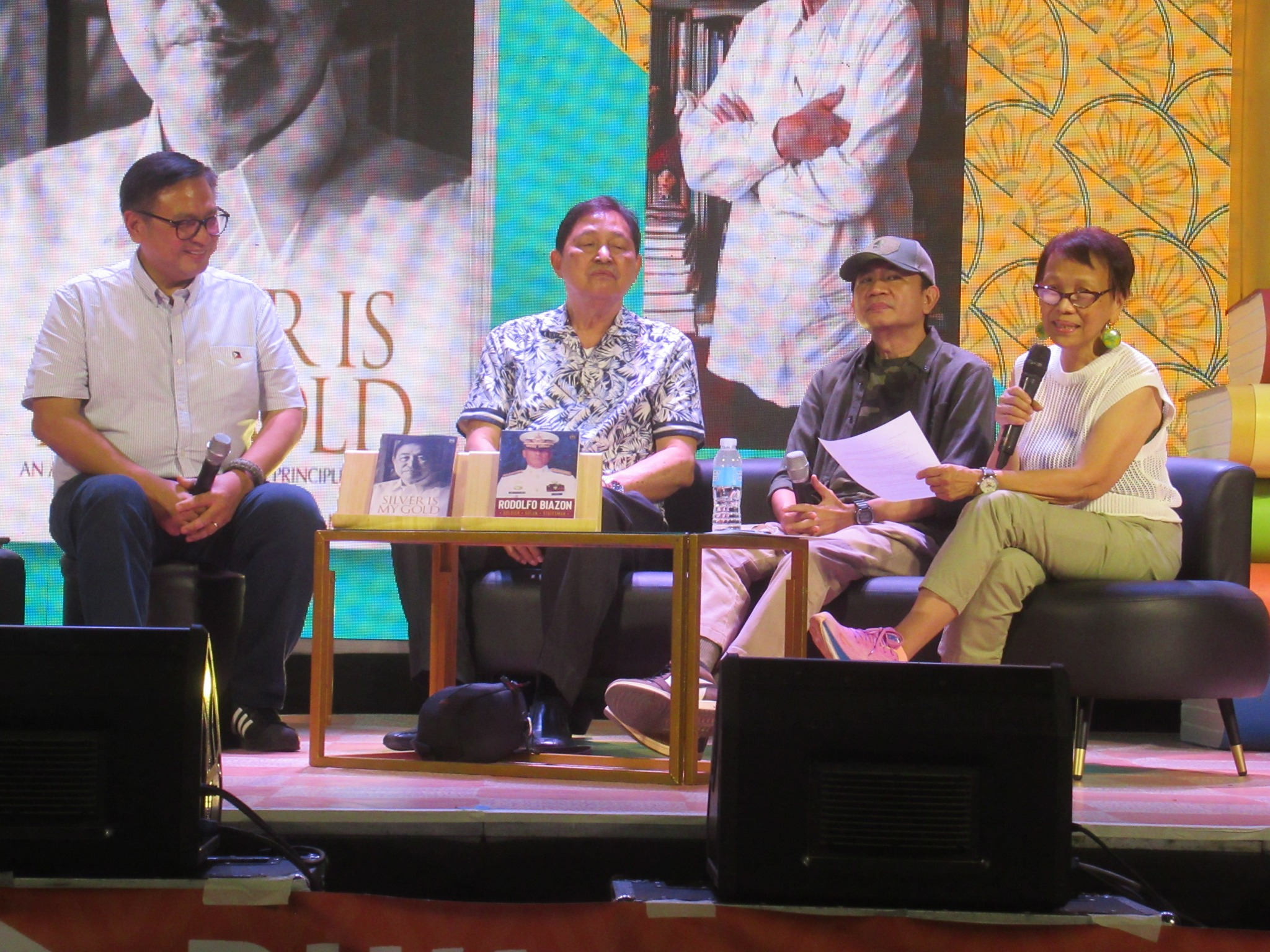
- Born: Marites Javier Dañguilan
- Education: University of the Philippines Diliman; London School of Economics
- Occupations: Journalist, author
- Notable work: Under the Crescent Moon: Rebellion in Mindanao (with Glenda M. Gloria); Shadow of Doubt; Rock Solid
- Spouse: Virgilio "Vet" Vitug
- Children: 1

Marites Javier Dañguilan Vitug is a Filipina journalist and author who co-founded the news magazine Newsbreak. She was a Nieman Fellow at Harvard University from 1986 to 1987.

== Early life and education ==
Marites Dañguilan Vitug was raised by her parents to be a devout Catholic in Solano, Nueva Vizcaya. Her mother was a member of the Catholic Women's League, while her father was a member of the Knights of Columbus. Vitug in her youth joined the Catholic Marian society called the Sodality of Our Lady.

Vitug received her Bachelor of Arts degree in broadcast communication at the University of the Philippines Diliman.

== Career ==
Vitug began her journalism career in the early 1980s, writing for the daily business newspaper Business Day (now BusinessWorld). Vitug cites the assassination of Benigno Aquino Jr. on August 21, 1983, as what prompted her to cover political issues and events such as insurgencies and protests, with the publisher of Business Day adding a political section to the paper. The first major figure she covered was Jose W. Diokno beginning 1983, whom she claimed to literally follow for three years from his home in New Manila, Quezon City to his leadership of the first street parliamentarian coalition, the "Justice for Aquino, Justice for all" or JAJA, until his last year before passing, which she deemed a second education. In April 1985, Vitug received a News Reporting award at the 9th Catholic Mass Media Awards for her work in Business Day during 1984.

Vitug's first book, titled Power from the Forest: The Politics of Logging, was published in 1993 by the Philippine Center for Investigative Journalism. She founded with fellow journalist Glenda Gloria the weekly news magazine Newsbreak, with its first issue released on January 24, 2001.

Vitug is currently the editor-at-large of the Filipino news site Rappler.

== Bibliography ==
- Vitug, Marites Dañguilan (1993). Power from the Forest: The Politics of Logging. Quezon City: Philippine Center for Investigative Journalism. (ISBN 9718686010)
- Vitug, Marites Dañguilan; Yabes, Criselda (1998). Jalan-Jalan: A Journey Through EAGA. Mandaluyong: Anvil Publishing. (ISBN 9712707601)
- Vitug, Marites Dañguilan; Gloria, Glenda M. (2000). Under the Crescent Moon: Rebellion in Mindanao. Quezon City: Ateneo Center for Social Policy & Public Affairs. (ISBN 9719167971)
- Vitug, Marites Dañguilan (2010). Shadow of Doubt: Probing the Supreme Court. Quezon City: Public Trust Media Group. (ISBN 978-9719473619)
- Vitug, Marites Dañguilan; Yabes, Criselda (2011). Our Rights, Our Victories: Landmark Cases in the Supreme Court. Quezon City: Cleverheads Publishing. (ISBN 978-9719518907)
- Vitug, Marites Dañguilan (2012). Hour Before Dawn: The Fall and Uncertain Rise of the Philippine Supreme Court. Quezon City: Cleverheads Publishing. (ISBN 978-9719518914)
- Almonte, Jose T.; Vitug, Marites Dañguilan (2015). Endless Journey: A Memoir. Quezon City: Cleverheads Publishing. (ISBN 978-9719518938)
- Vitug, Marites Dañguilan (2018). Rock Solid: How the Philippines Won Its Maritime Case Against China. Quezon City: Ateneo de Manila University Press. (ISBN 978-9715508735)
- Vitug, Marites Dañguilan; Elemia, Camille (2024). Unrequited Love: Duterte's China Embrace. Quezon City: Ateneo de Manila University Press.
