= National Union of Journalists of the Philippines =

Filipino journalists' trade union

- Abbreviation: NUJP
- Formation: 1986; 40 years ago
- Founder: Tony Nieva
- Founded at: Quezon City
- Region served: Philippines
- Secretary General: Paul Soriano
- Chairman: Lourdes Escaros
- Website: www.nujp.org

The National Union of Journalists of the Philippines (NUJP) is a Filipino non-governmental trade association that represents the interests of Filipino journalists. Among its leadership are representatives from PTV, ABS-CBN, PBS-DZRB, DZMM, RPN, GMA, the Philippine Daily Inquirer, The Philippine Star, Central Luzon Television, SunStar, IBC and TV5 (Interaksyon). NUJP is a member of the International Federation of Journalists.

The organization was founded in 1986 by Tony Nieva. Between then and 2013, they documented the murders of 167 Filipino journalists.

NUJP was chaired by Jose Jaime Espina from 2018 until 2021. Jonathan de Santos was chair and Ronalyn Olea was secretary general from 2021 to 2026.

Its leadership for the 2026-2028 term are the following:

Chairperson: Lourdes Escaros

Vice Chairperson: Kath Cortez

Secretary General: Paul Soriano

Deputy Secretary General: John Sitchon

Treasurer: Alyssa Clarin

Auditor: Zorayda Mustaril

Its directors are elected at a biennial congress.

It has campaigned in support of journalists it sees as being under attack, such as Maria Ressa of Rappler and organizations such as ABS-CBN. It is often quoted in the Philippine and international media in relationship to press freedom issues in the country.
