= Rappler =

Filipino news website

- Founded: January 1, 2012; 14 years ago
- Founders: Maria Ressa; Cheche Lazaro; Glenda Gloria; Chay Hofileña; Lilibeth Frondoso; Gemma Mendoza; Marites Dañguilan Vitug; Raymund Miranda; Manuel Ayala; Nico Jose Nolledo
- Headquarters: Unit B, 3/F, North Wing Estancia Offices, Capitol Commons, Ortigas Center, Pasig, Philippines
- Key people: Natashya Gutierrez (President); Maria Ressa (CEO); Jon Dayao (CTO); Glenda Gloria (Executive Editor); Chay Hofileña (Managing Editor)
- Revenue: PHP139.47 million (FY 2015)
- Operating income: PHP-38.35 million (FY 2015)
- Owner: Rappler Holdings Corporation (98.8%); Others (1.2%)
- Parent: Rappler Holdings Corporation
- Website: www.rappler.com

Rappler (portmanteau of the words "rap" and "ripples") is a Filipino online news website based in Pasig, Metro Manila, the Philippines. It was founded by 2021 Nobel Peace Prize laureate Maria Ressa along with a group of fellow Filipino journalists as well as technopreneurs. It started as a Facebook page named MovePH in August 2011 and evolved into a website on January 1, 2012.

In 2018, agencies under the Philippine government initiated legal proceedings against Rappler. Rappler and its staff alleged it was being targeted for its revelations of corruption by government and elected officials, the usage of bots and trolls favoring Rodrigo Duterte's administration, and documenting the Philippine drug war.

In October 2021, Rappler co-founder Ressa, alongside Russian journalist Dmitry Muratov, was awarded the Nobel Peace Prize for safeguarding freedom of expression in their homelands.

== History ==
With the idea of professional journalists using social media and crowd sourcing for news distribution, Rappler was started in 2011 by Filipino journalist Maria Ressa along with her entrepreneur and journalist friends. Brainstorming for the company began some time in 2010 when Maria Ressa was writing her second book, From Bin Laden to Facebook. Other key people involved in its conceptualization and creation were former Newsbreak head and ABS-CBN News Channel managing editor Glenda Gloria, journalist and Ateneo De Manila University professor Chay Hofileña, former TV Patrol executive producer Lilibeth Frondoso, Philippine Internet pioneer Nix Nolledo, Internet entrepreneur Manuel I. Ayala, and former NBC Universal Global Networks Asia-Pacific managing director Raymund Miranda.

Rappler first went public as a beta version website on January 1, 2012, the same day that the Philippine Daily Inquirer published a Rappler piece that broke the story of (then) Philippine Chief Justice Renato Corona being awarded a University of Santo Tomas doctoral degree without a required dissertation. The site officially launched at its #MoveManila event at the Far Eastern University in Manila on January 12, 2012.

=== Coverage of fake news campaigns in the Philippines ===
In 2016, Rappler began to be critical of the Duterte-led government of the Philippines, which had just taken office in 2016, and its controversial war on drugs after Rappler noticed a network of paid followers and dummy accounts on Facebook spreading fake news related to Duterte.

On January 11, 2018, the Securities and Exchange Commission revoked Rappler's license to operate as a "mass media" entity, for allegedly violating the Constitution's Foreign Equity Restrictions in Mass Media by being wholly foreign-owned. Rappler then sought a petition for review from the Court of Appeals on January 28, but was rejected on July 26, 2018, finding no grave abuse of discretion on the part of the SEC. Many journalistic organizations and committees saw the act as intimidation meant to silence opposition and control freedom of the press.

On October 26, 2017, Rappler became a member of the Poynter Institute's International Fact-Checking Network (IFCN). This led to Facebook tapping Rappler and Vera Files in April 2018 to be its Philippine partners on its worldwide fact-checking program, in part because of their participation in the IFCN. Under the program, false news stories will appear lower on users' news feeds and lower the chances of people seeing those stories. The program, according to a Facebook executive, "is one of the ways we hope to better identify and reduce the reach of false news that people share on our platform." A spokesperson for the Philippine government backed the fact-checking program but protested Facebook's partnership with Rappler.

=== Shutdown order by the Securities and Exchange Commission ===
On June 29, 2022, Maria Ressa released a statement stating that the Philippine government has ordered that Rappler be shut down. The shutdown order came right as the former President Rodrigo Duterte was set to leave office. The Securities and Exchange Commission stated that it decided to uphold the shut down order due to the findings of its own investigation and that of the courts finding Rappler's funding model to be unconstitutional. Ressa commented on the ruling and called them "intimidation tactics". She also stated that they will continue to exhaust all legal remedies to fight the ruling. She also noted that Rappler will continue to operate due to the order only being executory on approval of a court.

"This is intimidation. These are political tactics. We refuse to succumb to them. We're not going to voluntarily give up our rights. And we really shouldn't. I continue to appeal for that because when you give up your rights, you're never going to get them back." – Maria Ressa

On August 9, 2024, the Court of Appeals Special 7th Division promulgated a July 23 decision overturning the Securities and Exchange Commission's order in 2018 to shut down Rappler on foreign ownership grounds, citing "grave abuse of discretion" and other legal and constitutional violations by the former. In effect the CA, in granting Rappler's certiorari and prohibition directed the SEC to restore Rappler, Inc. and Rappler Holdings Corporation's certificate of Incorporation.

== Notable features ==
=== Mood Meter feature ===
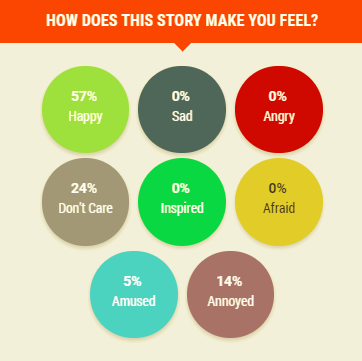
Rappler Mood Meter displaying the feedback of an article's readers

"Mood Meter" is a web widget embedded on each of Rappler's blogs and articles. It appears as colored bubbles showing the way people react to Rappler's stories. Readers are prompted to choose their response from eight different emotional reactions. The ten stories that received the most reactions in the last 48-hour period would appear on the Mood Navigator.

The Rappler Mood Meter, which is similar to Facebook Reactions, won the Bronze Medal for Brand Experience at the 2012 Boomerang Awards sponsored by the Internet Media Marketing Association of the Philippines.

=== Lighthouse platform ===
In 2020, Rappler launched its new content delivery and community engagement platform with several features such as WCAG 2.0 AA compliance, content moderation through topics, live blogs, and premium subscriptions. Rappler also allows private use of its new software platform for other organizations.

=== Rappler+ ===
Rappler+ is an exclusive membership program of Rappler launched in 2019. Aside from weekly newsletters, members get access to investigative reports, research data, industry reports, and e-books produced by the digital media and investigative journalism firm.

=== Agos ===
Agos is a crowdsourcing platform focused on disaster risk reduction and mitigation using digital technologies such as artificial intelligence and social media.

=== Newsbreak ===
Rappler traces part of its roots to Newsbreak, an investigative news magazine established in 2001 and noted for its coverage of political and social issues in the Philippines. Several of Rappler’s co-founders were previously part of Newsbreak, bringing their investigative and editorial expertise to Rappler’s pioneering online news approach.

== Content programming ==
- The wRap - a 5-minute daily news bulletin
- Rappler Talk - Conversations with newsmakers
- Rappler Live Jam - Live show featuring music and theater artists
- Kitchen 143 - Food lifestyle
- In the Public Square - Political commentary hosted by John Nery
- Homestretch - Weekly sports and tourism talk
- Hold the Line - interview series hosted by Maria Ressa
- World View - Global issues from a Filipino perspective hosted by Marites Vitug

== Legal issues ==
Rappler cases
- Alleged ownership irregularities: Securities and Exchange Commission: In re: Rappler Inc. and Rappler Holdings Corporation (SP Case No. 08-17-001); Court of Appeals: Rappler Inc. v. SEC (CA-G.R. SP No. 154292); Pasig City RTC Branch 265: People of the Philippines v. Maria Ressa (R-PSG-19-00737-CR); Alleged defamation: Manila RTC Branch 46: People of the Philippines v. Santos, Ressa and Rappler (R-MNL-19-01141-CR); Alleged tax evasion: Pasig City RTC Branch 165: People of the Philippines v. Rappler Holdings Corp. (R-PSG-18-02983-CR); Court of Tax Appeals: People of the Philippines v. Rappler Holdings Corp. and Maria Ressa (Crim. Case No. O-679)

Many legal cases have been filed by various government agencies against Rappler since 2017; these cases are collectively considered by The Guardian and Reporters Without Borders as "judicial harassment." Among other cases are cases alleging ownership irregularities and tax evasion. Both Ressa and Chel Diokno, a human rights attorney who represents Rappler, connect a statement made by President Duterte regarding Rappler's ownership during his 2017 State of the Nation Address to the outpour of legal cases against Rappler from all areas of the executive branch. If all of the cases filed against Ressa related to her management of Rappler up to June 18, 2020, were to result in guilty verdicts after final appeal, and the sentences were all to run consecutively, she would face around 100 years in prison.

=== Revocation of certificate of incorporation ===
On January 11, 2018, the Securities and Exchange Commission of the Philippines (SEC) revoked Rappler's certificate of incorporation over Rappler's use of Philippine Depository Receipts (PDRs). It said that the provisions of the PDR issued to Omidyar Network by Rappler gave the American investment firm control over the local media firms' other PDR holders as well as its corporate policies, which the SEC says is a violation of the Constitution's provisions on foreign ownership and control. Rappler claimed that it was 100% Filipino owned and that Omidyar only invests in the media firm. Despite the certificate revocation, SEC stated that Rappler could still operate since their decision was not final, pointing out that the media firm could also challenge the decision before the Court of Appeals within 15 days. Malacañang Palace also suggested that Rappler authors can still continue to publish on their website as bloggers. On February 28, Omidyar Network donated its Rappler PDRs to the editors and executives of Rappler.

Rappler alleged that the revocation of Rappler's certificate was an attack against the freedom of the press. The National Union of Journalists of the Philippines (NUJP), Foreign Correspondents Association of the Philippines (FOCAP) and the Philippine Press Institute (PPI) said the SEC ruling is part of a pattern of restricting criticism. The National Press Club of the Philippines, on the other hand, supported the SEC decision. Other groups such as the Philippine Center for Investigative Journalism and the Center for Media Freedom and Responsibility also expressed concerns about the revocation and press freedom in the country in general.

Members of the Philippine Senate and House of Representatives, mostly from the opposition, issued statements of concern, describing the SEC revocation of Rappler's license as "a loss for dissenting voices and free speech", "pure harassment" and "straight out of the dictator's playbook", and an "affront on press freedom." Law advocacy group CenterLaw said the move was unconstitutional since the SEC denied Rappler due process. It also said the SEC's action was "tantamount to prior restraint" of "a known critic of the government's drug war."

The Philippine government denied the claim, pointing out that President Rodrigo Duterte could have used the armed forces to implement Rappler's closure, as done by various foreign governments, but did not. The chief presidential legal counsel defended the SEC, saying the SEC's job was simply to punish violators of the law.

On March 8, 2018, the Bureau of Internal Revenue (BIR) filed criminal and tax evasion charges against Rappler Holdings Corp. before the Department of Justice (DoJ) for allegedly evading ₱133 million in taxes. Rappler's petition for review regarding the SEC's decision was subsequently rejected by the Court of Appeals on July 26, 2018, finding no grave abuse of discretion on the part of the SEC.

On June 29, 2022, Ressa released a statement during an international conference affirming that the SEC had upheld its earlier ruling to revoke Rappler's operating license. Ressa also stated that Rappler will file an appeal due to "proceedings that were highly irregular" in the SEC's decision.

On June 13, 2025, Ressa and five other Rappler executives were acquitted by a court in Pasig of violating restrictions on foreigners owning companies under the Anti-Dummy Law.

=== Cyberlibel ===
The National Bureau of Investigation of the Philippines subpoenaed Ressa and a former Rappler reporter on January 18, 2018, in connection with an online libel complaint filed by private entrepreneur Wilfredo Keng. The complaint was for a 2012 article that reported that then Philippine Supreme Court Chief Justice Renato Corona had been using a luxury vehicle owned by Keng. The report also claimed that Keng was involved in human trafficking.

On March 8, 2018, the National Bureau of Investigation lodged before the Department of Justice (DoJ) a cyber libel complaint against Rappler and its officers (Maria Ressa, former Rappler reporter Reynaldo Santos, Jr. who wrote the story, and directors and officers Manuel Ayala, Nico Jose Nolledo, Glenda Gloria, James Bitanga, Felicia Atienza, Dan Albert de Padua and Jose Maria G. Hofilena) in connection with a news article published in 2012 wherein citing in the complaint stated that “Unlike published materials on print, defamatory statements online, such as those contained in the libelous article written and published by subjects, [are]indubitably considered as a continuing crime until and unless the libelous article is actually removed or taken down. Otherwise, the same is a continuing violation of Section 4 (c) (4) of the Cybercrime Prevention Act of 2012”.

Ressa was arrested on February 13, 2019, and spent a night in jail before being able to bail herself out. The arrest was criticized by opposition and journalist groups, seeing the arrest as being politically motivated. The trial began on July 23, 2019. Ressa and Reynaldo Santos, Jr. were convicted of cyberlibel by Manila Regional Trial Court (RTC) Branch 46 on June 15, 2020, and sentenced to a maximum of six years in jail, along with being ordered to pay fines of ₱400,000 each. Human rights and media freedom advocates have characterized the court decision as a blow to freedom of the press and democracy.

After the verdict, Keng sued Ressa again for a different count of cyberlibel, this time over a tweet she wrote on February 15, 2019, which contained a screenshot of the 2002 Philippine Star article discussed in§ Santos Jr.'s article. Keng stated that by republishing the article "[Ressa] feloniously communicated the malicious imputations against me not only to her 350,000 Twitter followers, but to anyone who has access to the internet." Keng later withdrew the cyberlibel complaint after reportedly losing interest in the case.

On July 8, 2022, the Manila Regional Trial Court Branch 46 upheld the cyberlibel conviction of Ressa and Santos, sentencing them to serve a minimum of 6 months and 1 day to a maximum of 6 years, eight months and 20 days in jail.

=== Tax cases ===
On December 3, 2018, an arrest warrant for Rappler's founder Maria Ressa was sent to the Pasig police station, for alleged omissions in the VAT (value added tax) filings of Rappler, in connection with People of the Philippines v. Rappler Holdings Corp. and Maria Ressa (R-PSG-18-02983-CR). However, her arraignment in this case was suspended as she filed a motion to quash the information, and she was not arrested in connection with this warrant, as she posted bail in the amount of ₱60,000 the same day. As of January 2020, the case remains suspended, as the Pasig RTC has still not ruled on the motion.

On March 29, 2019, Ressa was arrested again upon her arrival at Ninoy Aquino International Airport from an overseas trip. The arrest warrant was issued by the Pasig RTC Branch 265 against Ressa in connection with yet another case she and members of Rappler's 2016 board are facing, this time for alleged violations of the Anti-Dummy Law (C.A. No. 108). Ressa posted bail in the amount of ₱100,000 the same day.

In January 2023, a Philippine court acquitted Ressa and Rappler of tax evasion charges stemming from the 2018 case.

== Ownership structure ==
As of 2017, Rappler is owned primarily by Rappler Holdings Corporation, which is in turn owned by Dolphin Fire Group (31.2%), Maria Ressa (23.8%), Hatchd Group (17.9%), Benjamin So (17.9%), and 9.3 percent of minority shares.

Raw data

Rappler originally drew in funds through the issuance of Philippine Depository Receipts (PDR), which allowed foreign firms Omidyar Network and North Base Media to invest in Rappler.

Philippine Depository Receipts (PDR) issued by Rappler
| Quantity | Issue date | Issue |
|---|---|---|
| 264,601 | May 29, 2015 | NBM Rappler* |
| 11,764,117 | July 29, 2015 | NBM Rappler* |
| 7,217,257 | October 2, 2015 | Omidyar Network |

On February 28, 2018, Omidyar Network donated its Rappler PDRs to the editors and executives of Rappler.

The 2020 revenue of Rappler is broken down as follows:

- Consultancies (43%)
- Direct advertising (22%)
- Grants (15%), detailed below
- Programmatic advertising (9%)
- Others (3%)

Rappler receives grants for fact-checking, related research and initiatives to address online disinformation from organizations including:

- Facebook as part of the Third Party Fact-Checker Program
- National Endowment for Democracy
- Friedrich Naumann Foundation
- Internews
- Meedan
- Google News Initiative

== Controversies and criticisms ==
In 2021, Rappler drew controversy and was criticized by Filipino netizens for the tone of its headline on the death of Eli Soriano.
