= National Task Force for the West Philippine Sea =

Philippine government inter-agency body

Inter-agency task force overview
- Formed: March 17, 2016; 10 years ago
- Preceding Inter-agency task force: Inter-Agency Coordinating Committee on the West Philippine Sea
- Jurisdiction: Philippines
- Inter-agency task force executive: Eduardo Oban, Chairperson (as National Security Adviser)
- Key document: Memorandum Circular No. 94, s. 2016

The National Task Force for the West Philippine Sea (NTF-WPS) is an inter-agency body of the Philippine government that coordinates the work of national government agencies in the West Philippine Sea. It was formally established on March 17, 2016, through Memorandum Circular No. 94 issued under President Benigno Aquino III. The task force is chaired ex officio by the National Security Adviser, while the National Security Council provides it with administrative and technical support.

== History ==
Memorandum Circular No. 94 stated that issues in the West Philippine Sea extended beyond maritime security to diplomatic, legal, information, military, law-enforcement and socio-economic concerns, and therefore required a coordinated national response. The order transferred to the NTF-WPS the functions of the Inter-Agency Coordinating Committee on the West Philippine Sea. Contemporary reporting described the new body as a mechanism for coordinating Philippine policy in the South China Sea disputes. A 2019 journal study placed the task force within a series of Philippine institutional responses following the 2012 Scarborough Shoal standoff, which also included the Inter-Agency Coordinating Committee and the National Coast Watch Council.

== Mandate and organization ==
Under its enabling circular, the NTF-WPS receives guidance from the president through the Cabinet Cluster on Security, Justice and Peace. Its principal function is to orchestrate and synchronize the capabilities of national government agencies in pursuit of Philippine objectives in the West Philippine Sea. It also submits reports and recommendations to the president through the security cluster.

The circular made the National Security Adviser chairperson and named the following as members: the departments of Foreign Affairs, National Defense, Justice, the Interior and Local Government, Environment and Natural Resources, Energy, Agriculture, Trade and Industry, Transportation and Communications, and Finance; the National Economic and Development Authority, National Coast Watch System, Armed Forces of the Philippines, Philippine National Police Maritime Group, Philippine Coast Guard and Bureau of Fisheries and Aquatic Resources. The chairperson may designate additional government officials and private citizens. Each member agency is represented on a permanent basis by an official with the rank of undersecretary.

The NTF-WPS is required to create an area-level task force to coordinate government capabilities, assets, equipment and personnel in the operational area. The area-level body may in turn organize tactical-level task forces drawn from different agencies.

A 2023 paper published by the Japan Institute of International Affairs described the NTF-WPS as playing an important role in protecting Philippine maritime interests, but argued that its command structure was fragmented and could result in inconsistent policies among member agencies. The paper recommended a strategic framework for identifying, assessing and assigning responses to maritime "gray-zone" operations.

== Activities and public communication ==
In March 2021, the task force reported that about 220 vessels believed to be operated by the Chinese maritime militia had gathered at Whitsun Reef, which the Philippines calls Julian Felipe Reef. It expressed concern about possible overfishing, environmental damage and navigational safety, and said that the government would continue monitoring the area.

The task force later took part in the Philippine government's public-information approach to maritime incidents, commonly described as an "assertive transparency" initiative. A 2024 policy brief from the University of the Philippines Center for Integrative and Development Studies said that the NTF-WPS coordinated with the Coast Guard and other agencies in disseminating information about events at sea. Reuters reported in 2026 that then National Security Adviser Eduardo Año had led the transparency initiative, which publicized what the Philippine government characterized as aggressive conduct against Philippine coast-guard personnel and fishers.

In April 2025, the task force announced an inter-agency operation involving Philippine Navy and Coast Guard vessels around three sandbanks near Thitu Island. The operation followed competing Philippine and Chinese assertions of control over Sandy Cay; The Washington Post reported that there was no evidence China had permanently occupied the feature.

== See also ==
- National Coast Watch Council
- Philippine Coast Guard
- Philippines v. China
- Territorial disputes in the South China Sea
