= PawnHero =

PawnHero is an online pawnshop that was launched in the Philippines in February 2015 as PawnHero.ph, an online pawning and selling website managed by PawnHero Pawnshop Philippines Inc. It allowed smartphone users to pawn items. PawnHero is a licensed broker registered with the Bangko Sentral ng Pilipinas.

== Funding ==
PawnHero received strategic seed funding from Sulficio Tagud, 500 Startups, IMJ Investment Partners, Kaikaku Fund (Softbank and Alibaba), and also from angel investors, such as Paul V. Rivera.

== Awards ==
In March 2015, PawnHero won Judge's Choice in the Top 100 Startups Philippine Qualifiers for Echelon Asia Summit 2015. Three months later, it won the Judge's Choice Award as the Most Promising Startup in Asia at the Echelon Asia Summit 2015 in Singapore.
