= Bulatlat =

Philippine independent online alternative news outlet

- Format: Online newspaper
- Publisher: Alipato Media Center Inc.
- Editor-in-chief: Ronalyn V. Olea
- Associate editor: Danilo A. Arao
- Managing editor: Anne Marxze D. Umil
- Founded: February 7, 2001
- Political alignment: Left-wing
- Language: Filipino, English
- Headquarters: Quezon City, Philippines
- Country: Philippines
- Website: www.bulatlat.com

Bulatlat ("to open up, expose") is a Philippine independent online alternative news outlet based in Quezon City, Philippines. It was established in 2001 in the days leading up to the Second EDSA Revolution and is published by Alipato Media Center, Inc. Bulatlat is currently the oldest online news outlet in the Philippines.

Bulatlat was the recipient of the Center for Media Freedom and Responsibility Award of Distinction in 2022. It is also the first newsroom in the Philippines to receive accreditation from the Journalism Trust Initiative.

== History ==
Bulatlat was founded in 2001 by journalists and human rights defenders in response to "blatant corruption by those who claimed to work for the interests of the Filipino people." Bulatlat was founded as a response to the Joseph Estrada administration's threats to press freedom, particularly after Estrada called for an advertiser boycott of the Philippine Daily Inquirer and the takeover of Manila Times following a libel suit. The name Bulatlat means "to open up" or "to expose" in Filipino.

First envisioned as a newsletter, Bulatlat became a weekly online news magazine before settling on daily news releases. The idea of using the Internet as a medium for news was floated as early as 1999, but the events leading up to President Estrada's ouster led to its creation taking a backseat until 2001.

=== Website blocking ===
The National Telecommunications Commission (NTC) issued an order in June 2022 for internet service providers to block access to 26 websites, including that of Bulatlat. alleging the sites to be "affiliated to and are supporting" the Communist Party of the Philippines, New People's Army and the National Democratic Front (CPP–NPA–NDF). A Quezon City regional trial court issued an injunction in August 2022 ordering the NTC to unblock Bulatlat's website, citing the news website's rights to be protected by the Constitutional provision on freedom of speech and of the press. The court later rejected the NTC's plea for reconsideration, reiterating that Bulatlat’s constitutional rights were violated when its website was blocked.

On November 18, 2025, Quezon City Regional trial court branch 104 voided the National Telecommunications Commission 2022 order to block 27 websites, including Bulatlat. According to the court, the Anti-Terrorism Act of 2020 does not provide a legal basis to censor online media and that the NTC blocking is content-based prior restraint that "violates the constitutional guarantees of free speech and expression".

==== Censorship on social media ====
On May 3, 2023, Meta restricted access to Bulatlat's Facebook page for allegedly violating Facebook's community standards. On August 7, 2025, Meta's Instagram suspended Bulatlat's page for allegedly violating Facebook's community standards on fraud and deception. Meta rejected appeals to reinstate Bulatlat's Instagram page amid protests by Bulatlat and Altermidya. "It is hypocritical for Meta to accuse us of false reporting when it has allowed trolls and other harmful forces to dominate its platform", Bulatlat said in a statement.

== See also ==
- Mass media in the Philippines
