= 2022 Philippine presidential election in Sarangani =

- May 9, 2022
- Registered: 362,055
- Turnout: 76.97%(▼4.02pp)
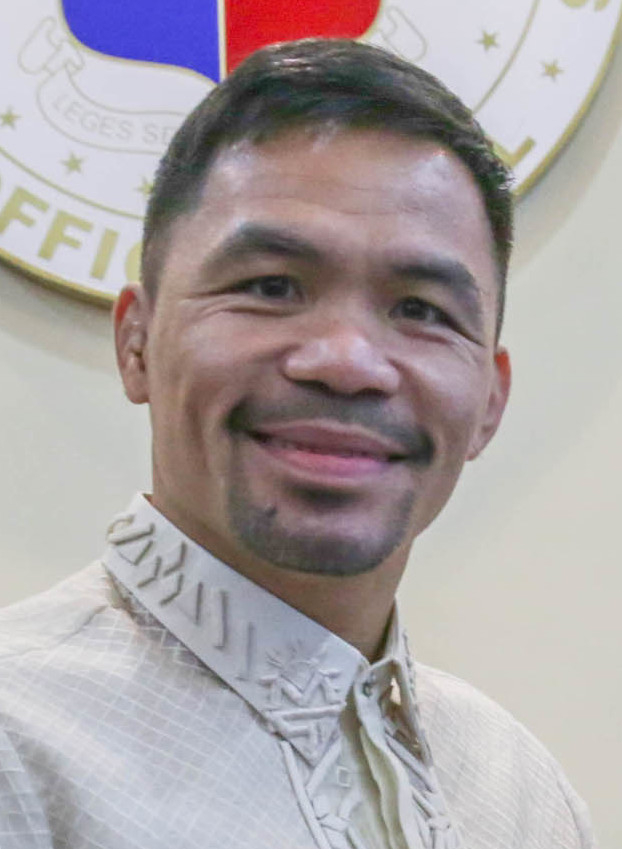

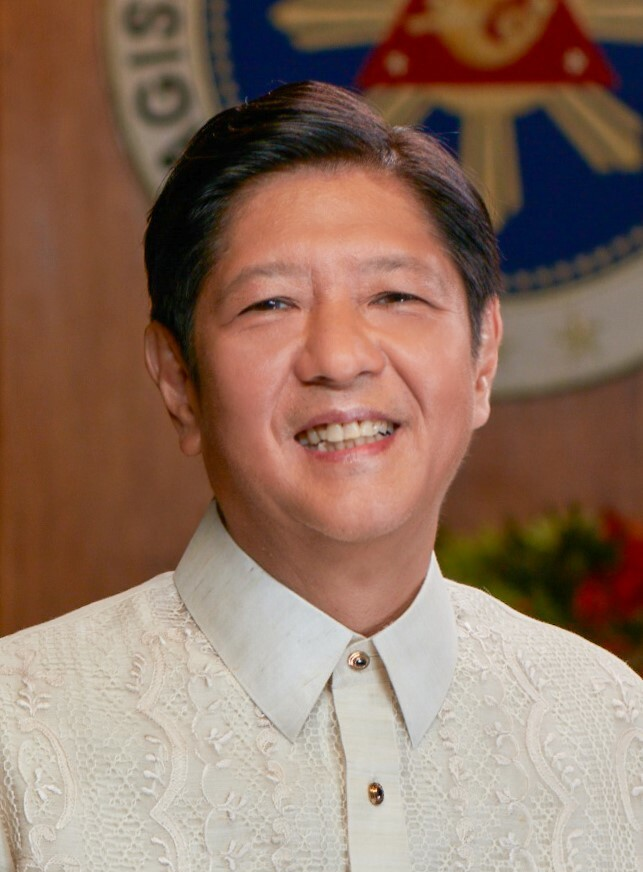
Candidate	Manny Pacquiao	Bongbong Marcos
Party	PROMDI	PFP
Alliance	MP3	Uniteam
Running mate	Lito Atienza	Sara Duterte
Popular vote	163,494	79,362
Percentage	62.01%	30.10%
President before election
Rodrigo Duterte
PDP–Laban
Elected President
Bongbong Marcos
PFP
- 2022 Philippine vice presidential election in Sarangani
- May 9, 2022

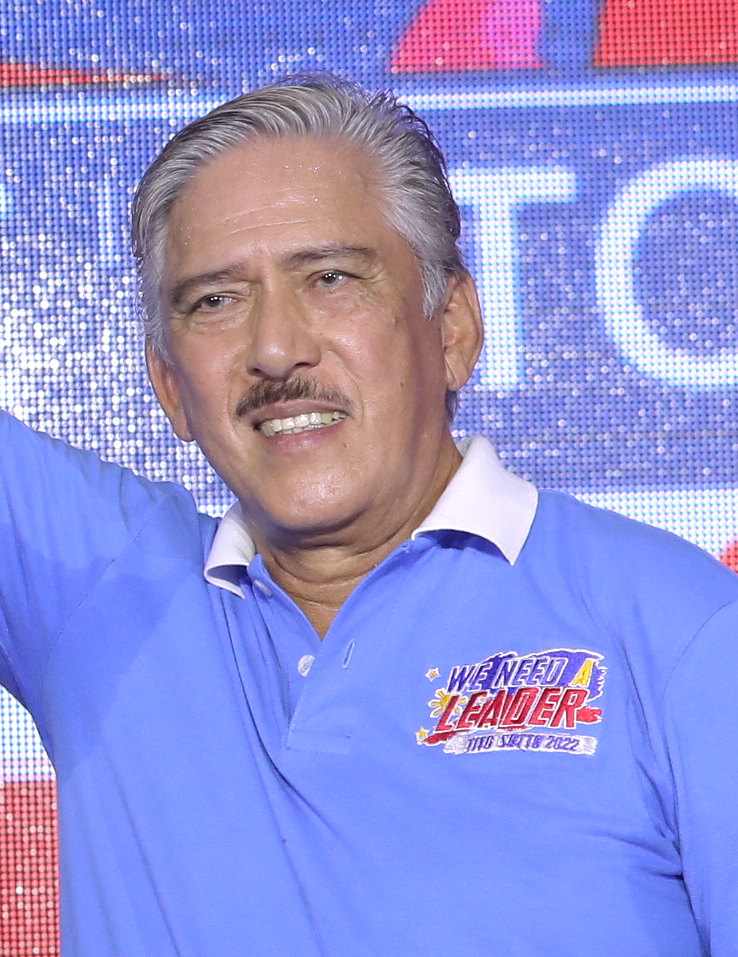
Candidate	Sara Duterte	Tito Sotto
Party	Lakas-CMD	NPC
Alliance	Uniteam	Lacson-Sotto
Popular vote	187,202	26,633
Percentage	77.22%	10.98%
Vice President before election
Leni Robredo
Liberal
Elected Vice President
Sara Duterte
Lakas

The 2022 Philippine presidential and vice presidential election in Sarangani were held on Monday, May 9, 2022, as part of the 2022 Philippine general election in which all 81 provinces and 149 cities participated. Voters voted the president and the vice president separately.

Professional boxer and senator Emmanuel "Manny" Pacquiao of the Progressive Movement for the Devolution of Initiatives (MP3) won in the province of Sarangani defeating former senator Ferdinand "Bongbong" Marcos of the Partido Federal ng Pilipinas (UniTeam). Pacquiao managed to get 163,494 votes or 62.01% against Marcos's 79,362. 8 other candidates ran for president. Pacquiao previously served as the congressman of Sarangani's at-large congressional district from 2010 to 2016.

However, Marcos's running mate Davao City mayor Sara Duterte of Lakas–CMD (UniTeam) won the province in a landslide against Senate president Vicente "Tito" Sotto III of the Nationalist People's Coalition (Lacson-Sotto) and Senator Francis "Kiko" Pangilinan of the Liberal Party (Tropa), while Pacquiao's running mate House deputy speaker Jose "Lito" Atienza of the same party (MP3) landed in 4th place. Duterte gained 187,202 votes or 77.22% while Sotto achieved 26,633 votes or 10.98%, Pangilinan achieved 15,140 votes or 6.24% and Atienza gained 5,048 votes or just 2.08%. 5 other candidates ran for president.

Sarangani was won by MP3 in the presidential race, however, the vice presidential race in the province was won by the UniTeam alliance. Sarangani is the only province during the election where Pacquiao got first place and one of the two provinces in Mindanao that Marcos didn't won.

== Candidates ==
List of Presidential and Vice Presidential candidates
#	Candidate (For President)	Party	#	Candidate (For Vice President/Running Mate)	Party
1.	Ernesto Abella	Independent		None	None
2.	Leody de Guzman	PLM	2.	Walden Bello	PLM
3.	Isko Moreno	Aksyon	6.	Willie Ong	Aksyon
4.	Norberto Gonzales	PDSP		None	None
5.	Panfilo Lacson	Independent (Note: initially ran under Partido Reporma but switched to being an independent on March 24, 2022 after the party withdrew their support for Lacson and switched to Leni Robredo. Ballots still shown Lacson under Partido Reporma)	9.	Tito Sotto	NPC
6.	Faisal Mangondato	Katipunan	8.	Carlos Serapio	Katipunan
7.	Bongbong Marcos	PFP	4.	Sara Duterte	Lakas
8.	Jose Montemayor Jr.	DPP	3.	Rizalito David	DPP
9.	Manny Pacquiao	PROMDI	1.	Lito Atienza	PROMDI
10.	Leni Robredo	Independent (Note: Member of the Liberal Party but ran as an independent)	7.	Kiko Pangilinan	Liberal
	None	None	5.	Manny SD Lopez	WPP

== Results ==
=== Presidential results ===
Candidate	Party	Votes	%
Manny Pacquiao	PROMDI	163,494	62.02
Bongbong Marcos	PFP	79,362	30.10
Leni Robredo	Independent	13,782	5.23
Isko Moreno	Aksyon Demokratiko	2,154	0.82
Panfilo Lacson	Independent	1,154	0.44
Faisal Mangondato	Katipunan	1,374	0.52
Ernesto Abella	Independent	744	0.28
Jose Montemayor Jr.	DPP	668	0.25
Norberto Gonzales	PDSP	510	0.19
Leody de Guzman	PLM	394	0.15
Total		263,636	100.00
Valid votes		263,636	94.60
Invalid/blank votes		15,036	5.40
Total votes		278,672	100.00
Registered voters/turnout		362,055	76.97

=== Vice presidential results ===
Candidate	Party	Votes	%
Sara Duterte	Lakas-CMD	187,202	77.23
Tito Sotto	NPC	26,633	10.99
Kiko Pangilinan	Liberal Party	15,140	6.25
Lito Atienza	PROMDI	5,048	2.08
Willie Ong	Aksyon Demokratiko	3,135	1.29
Manny SD Lopez	WPP	2,709	1.12
Carlos Serapio	Katipunan	1,184	0.49
Walden Bello	PLM	812	0.33
Rizalito David	DPP	535	0.22
Total		242,398	100.00
Valid votes		242,398	86.98
Invalid/blank votes		36,274	13.02
Total votes		278,672	100.00
Registered voters/turnout		362,055	76.97
