= Malaya (newspaper) =

Broadsheet newspaper in the Philippines

- The front page of Malaya Business Insight on October 15, 2026
- Type: Daily newspaper
- Format: Broadsheet
- Owner(s): People's Independent Media, Inc.
- Founder(s): Jose Burgos, Jr., Amado P. Macasaet (Malaya Business Insight)
- Publisher: Allen A. Macasaet
- Editor: Nerilyn Tenorio (Editor-in-Chief)
- Managing editor: Ma. Teresa A. Molina
- Founded: January 31, 1983; 43 years ago
- Political alignment: Centre
- Language: English (since 1983); Filipino (1981-1982)
- Headquarters: Chinese Commercial Bldg., 652 Sto. Tomas Street, Intramuros, Manila, Philippines
- City: Manila
- Country: Philippines
- Circulation: 80,000 (2012)
- ISSN: 0115-8104
- OCLC number: 28607159
- Website: malaya.com.ph

Malaya, originally named Ang Pahayagang Malaya ("The Free Newspaper" in Filipino) and concurrently known as Malaya Business Insight, is a broadsheet newspaper in the Philippines, headquartered at Intramuros, Manila, and owned by People's Independent Media Inc. The newspaper is known for being one of the publications that fought against the presidency of Ferdinand Marcos.

Prior to the unified version since 2025, the newspaper also published a business section called the Malaya Business Insight which is placed before the actual Malaya.

== History ==
=== Under Jose Burgos, Jr. ===
The newspaper's name was derived from the Filipino word that means "free". In 1981, Malaya was founded by Jose Burgos, Jr. as a weekly, and later daily written in the Tagalog language. It eventually began publishing content in English language in 1983, when President Ferdinand Marcos closed down WE Forum, a sister publication of Malaya. It continued to fight the administration of Marcos during its last years in power. During the events that lead to Marcos' ouster, Malaya published one million copies daily, a feat never been done before in the history of newspaper publishing in the Philippines.

==== Marcos dictatorship ====
Among the journalists who wrote for Malaya during this time included Chuchay Fernandez, Joel Paredes, Chit Estella, Ellen Tordesillas, Rita Festin, Desiree Carlos, Joel Saracho, and Estelita "Esty" Juco.

=== Under Amado Macasaet ===
The front page of Malaya on June 26, 2015.

After the EDSA Revolution, Amado P. Macasaet, veteran journalist and then Business Editor of Malaya, became the new owner of Malaya. Macasaet also owned two tabloids, Abante and Abante Tonite.

In 2025, the newspaper underwent a relaunch by merging its general section with the Business Insight section, and the appointment of journalist Nerilyn Tenorio as the new Editor-in-Chief. The newspaper is also expanding its publication, including a new weekend edition called the Malaya Business Insight Weekender.
