= Rappler's Newsbreak (magazine) =

Philippine online news magazine

- Categories: News magazine
- First issue: January 24, 2001
- Company: Public Trust Media Group, Inc.
- Country: Philippines
- Website: www.rappler.com/newsbreak/

Rappler's Newsbreak is an online news and current affairs magazine published in the Philippines. It began publication as a weekly magazine on January 24, 2001.

They have published stories covering various issues that concern Congress, the presidency, security sector, judiciary, the media, local governments, elections, business and the economy. The magazine is most notable as a watchdog, having published investigative reports on social ills and corruption in the Philippines.

== Awards ==
On June 25, 2009, Rappler's Newsbreak magazine issue on large-scale mining entitled "The Big Dig" edited by Roel Landingin was given special mention at the 20th Jaime V. Ongpin Awards for Excellence in Journalism. Miriam Grace Go, for her story "A Policy of Betrayal" for abs-cbnNEWS.com/Newsbreak, earned special distinction at the 20th Jaime V. Ongpin Awards for Excellence in Journalism, while Aries Rufo was a finalist for his report "The Many Faces of Bribery" for abs-cbnNEWS.com/Newsbreak.

On June 26, 2008 they received the top awards at the 19th Jaime V. Ongpin Awards for Excellence in Journalism, the most prestigious award for journalism in the Philippines. Glenda Gloria's "Trapped in a Web of Lives" and Roel Landingin's "The Battle for Manila's Gateway," both published in their magazine, won the top prizes. The Canadian Embassy gave the Marshall McLuhan Prize to Gloria for Rappler's Newsbreak. Her prize included a study tour of Canada. The Australian Embassy bestowed the Australian Ambassador's Award, a travel grant.

Roel Landingan also won the first Media Awards given during National Statistics Month, for his article "The Hidden Job Crisis".

== Recognition ==
Rappler's Newsbreaks co-founder and editor-in-chief, Marites Dañguilan Vitug, was named number forty-five in the Eurasia Group Global Leaders 50 of 2006. Ethical Corporation also gave recognition to their Business Editor, Lala Rimando, as one of the 15 leaders who made a difference in 2007, sharing the limelight with the likes of former US President Bill Clinton and former US Vice President Al Gore.

In its review of the magazine, The New York Times characterized them as a publication that challenges taboos. Likewise, Foreign Policy described them as "comprehensive... and helps place the ordinary lives of Mindanao’s people in a political context."
