= BusinessWorld =

Business newspaper in the Philippines

- The front page of BusinessWorld on April 13, 2018
- Type: Daily newspaper (excluding weekends)
- Format: Broadsheet
- Owner(s): Philstar Daily Inc., (70%); World Press, Inc. (30%)
- Founder: Raúl L. Locsin
- Publisher: BusinessWorld Publishing Corporation
- President: Miguel G. Belmonte
- Editor-in-chief: Cathy Rose A. Garcia
- Associate editor: Alicia A. Herrera; Bettina Fay V. Roc; Timothy Roy Medina; Arjay L. Balinbin
- Opinion editor: Alicia A. Herrera
- Founded: February 27, 1967; 59 years ago (21,806 issues)
- Political alignment: Centre
- Language: English
- Headquarters: 95 Balete Drive Extension, Brgy. Kristong Hari, New Manila, Quezon City, Metro Manila, Philippines
- City: Manila
- Country: Philippines
- Circulation: 117,000 (as of March 31, 2014)
- Website: www.bworldonline.com

BusinessWorld is a business newspaper in the Philippines with a nationwide circulation of more than 117,000 (as of March 2014). Founded in 1967 as Business Day, it is Southeast Asia's first daily business newspaper.

== History ==
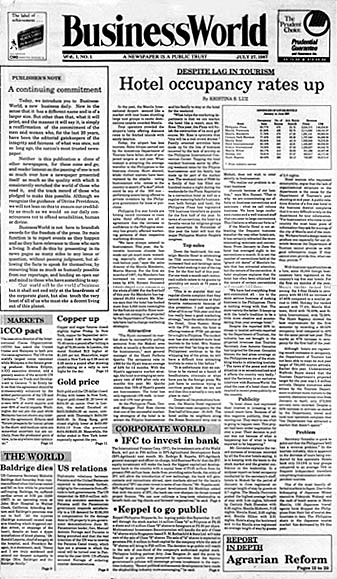
Front page of BusinessWorld, July 27, 1987

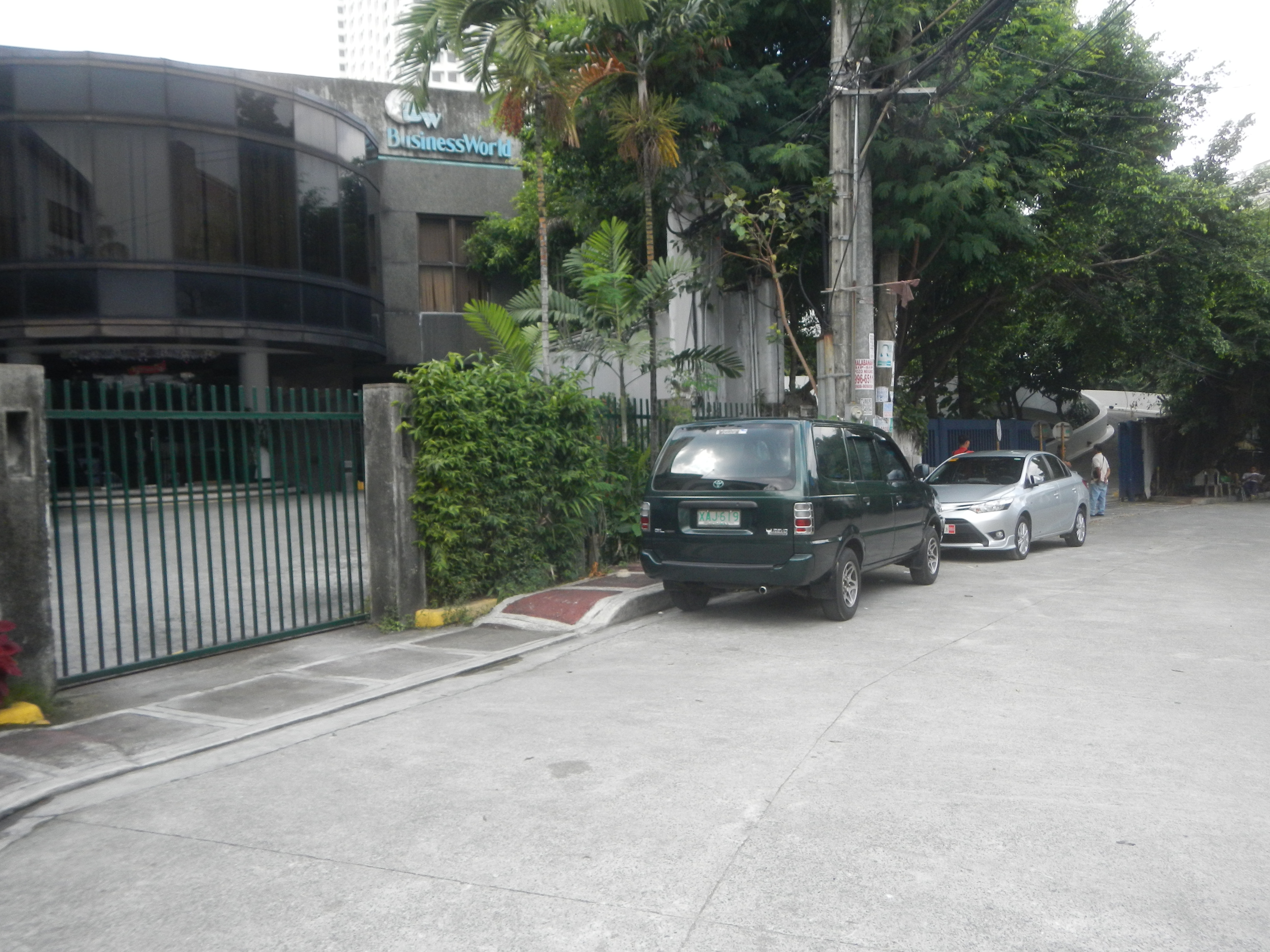
The current headquarters of the BusinessWorld at Balete Drive Extension

=== Business Day (1967–1987) ===
Raul L. Locsin became a business reporter for the Manila Chronicle in 1963. He helped establish the Economic Monitor, the first business weekly in the Philippines. Then, he founded Business Day, the first Southeast Asian business daily.

In its debut issue, released on February 27, 1967, Business Day promised "competent and responsible reporting of the news." As editor-in-chief, Locsin aimed to demystify business and economics and make the subject more accessible to the general public. During martial law under Ferdinand Marcos (1972–1981), Business Day was the only independently owned newspaper in Manila. It gained a reputation for accuracy in an era of misinformation, as Locsin was committed to the tenet that "a newspaper is a public trust" and promised editorial freedom. Business Day ran articles critical of President Marcos.

After a labor strike by leftist staff, Locsin resigned and closed Business Day in 1987. Four months prior, he had finished repaying the newspaper's accumulated debt. The majority of his former staff picketed his house to convince him to return. They set up a new corporation, BusinessWorld Publishing Corporation, with Locsin accepting the position of publisher, president, and editor.

=== BusinessWorld (1987–2003) ===
The first issue of BusinessWorld, the successor of Business Day, was released on July 27, 1987. In the same year, BusinessWorld became the first among local dailies to use desktop publishing, and in 1991 it incorporated World Press, Inc., a fully owned printing subsidiary of the firm located in Antipolo, Rizal.

World Press, which started with a five-unit web offset printing press, already had nine units by 1995. In two years, it was able to own pre-press facilities that allowed for the Color Electronic Pagination System, which made BusinessWorld the country's first newspaper printed in full color.

Previously housed in Ortigas Center, Pasig, BusinessWorld moved to its current location in New Manila, Quezon City in 1994. The building was designed by Locsin's cousin, the late National Artist for Architecture Leandro V. Locsin, who also worked on the Philippine Stock Exchange Plaza in Makati.

When Locsin died in May 2003 after a long-term illness, his wife, executive editor and chief operating officer Leticia Locsin, took over as the paper's president, publisher, and chairperson until her death in August 2005. Their daughter, Barbara Locsin, headed the paper for a while, later succeeded by Anthony Cuaycong as chief operating officer.

=== MVP Group acquisition ===
In 2004, the Philippine Long Distance Telephone Company (PLDT), led by businessman Manuel V. Pangilinan, acquired a minority stake in BusinessWorld through PLDT's Beneficial Trust Fund unit, MediaQuest Holdings, Inc.

In September 2013, MediaQuest assumed control of the paper, with its subsidiary Hastings Holdings Inc. increasing its stake from 30% to 76.67% and infusing ₱100 million into the company over the next 12 months. Smart Communications, Inc. co-founder and chief wireless advisor Orlando Vea was named acting president. In March 2014, José Roberto "Roby" A. Alampay, head of Philippine news portal and PLDT subsidiary InterAksyon.com and a News5 anchor, was appointed concurrent editor-in-chief of the newspaper.

In July 2015, The Philippine Star acquired the entire 76.63% stake of its sister broadsheet BusinessWorld from Hastings Holdings Inc., the subsidiary of The Star's parent, MediaQuest. The Philippine Star president Miguel G. Belmonte was named concurrent president of the broadsheet.

In January 2020, managing editor Wilfredo G. Reyes was appointed as the paper's new editor-in-chief replacing Alampay.

== BusinessWorld Live ==
In 2018, BusinessWorld became part of the One News organization, a 24-hour English-language news channel owned and operated by Cignal TV, the cable TV business of the MVP Group's Mediaquest Holdings, Inc. The newspaper launched its own business news program, BusinessWorld Live, in the channel. The one-hour program premiered on May 28, 2018, and airs every weekdays, 9:00 to 10:00 a.m. (PST). Due to COVID-19 pandemic, BusinessWorld Live temporarily broadcasts from 10:30 AM to 11:00 AM. TV personalities Danie Laurel and JP Ong (replaced by Jes delos Santos in 2019) hosts the business news program.

== BusinessWorld Economic Forum ==
In 2016, BusinessWorld hosted the inaugural BusinessWorld Economic Forum at the Bonifacio Global City in Taguig, Philippines with the theme "Charting Progress to 2020: What to Expect from the New Presidency". The annual business forum gathers some of the biggest names in Philippine and global business for a day of discussion sessions on different trends and events affecting the future of business, trade and economics.

Since its inception, the forum has been held three times already, each with a different theme and set of speakers. In 2020, the event will be held online due to the COVID-19 pandemic in the Philippines.

=== Forum themes ===
- 2016 - held on July 12, 2016, at the Shangri-La The Fort, Bonifacio Global City, Taguig, with the theme, "Charting Progress to 2020: What to Expect from the New Presidency".
- 2017 - held on May 19, 2017, at Shangri-La at The Fort in Bonifacio Global City, Taguig with the theme, "Fueling Philippine Economic Expansion Beyond 2017: The Engines of Growth".
- 2018 - held on May 18, 2018, at the Grand Hyatt Manila in Bonifacio Global City, Taguig with the theme, "Disruptor or Disrupted? The Philippines at the Crossroads".
- 2019 - held on May 30, 2019, at the Grand Hyatt Manila in Bonifacio Global City, Taguig with the theme, "The Fu of Business: Next-wave Disruptions & Opportunities".
- 2020 - to be held online from November 25 to 26, 2020 with the theme, "The Big Reshape: Towards a More Resilient, Sustainable and Inclusive Future".
- 2021 -
- 2022 -

== BusinessWorld Top 1000 Corporations in the Philippines ==
Business World Magazine's annual ranking of the Philippines' largest corporations, ranked by revenue, is known as the BusinessWorld Top 1000 Corporations in the Philippines. The list provides detailed information about each company, such as after-tax profits, assets, investors and shareholders' assets, and market value. Public companies with their corporate offices and incorporation in the Philippines are included in the top 1000. Meralco, Petron Corporation, Toyota Motor Philippines, Pilipinas Shell, Texas Instruments Philippines, Toshiba Information Equipment, Philippine Airlines, Mercury Drug, BDO Unibank, and Nestlé Philippines are among the Top 1000 Corporations in the Philippines.

According to the Philippine Star, the BusinessWorld Top 1000 firms’ performance in 2016 is reflective of the overall economic performance that year with gross domestic product growth of 6.9 percent being the fastest in three years as well as the second fastest among its Asian neighbors.

The Top 1000 list has become vital to the research on performance of Philippine companies and domestic economy that the Business Expectations Survey that is released on a quarterly basis by the Bangko Sentral ng Pilipinas is drawn from a pool of the Securities and Exchange Commission’s Top 7,000 Corporations in 2010, and Business World’s Top 1,000 Corporations in 2013.

Additionally, the Conduct of the Corporate Financial Trends Survey (CFTS) by the Philippine Financial Stability Coordination Council (FSCC) also selected sample establishments/enterprises from the list of Top 1,000 Corporations released by the BusinessWorld. The FSCC consists of Bangko Sentral ng Pilipinas (BSP), Department of Finance (DOF), Insurance Commission (IC), Philippine Deposit Insurance Corporation (PDIC), and Securities and Exchange Commission (SEC).

A study published in DLSU Business & Economics Review evaluated the Web presence of the top multinational manufacturing corporations in the Philippines from a sample of 70 Web sites of companies in BusinessWorld’s list of the Top 1000 Corporations in the Philippines for 2006. The websites were subjected to a framework of ten critical factors; and comparisons were made against existing benchmarks. Thereafter, the functionality of the Web sites of the three top-ranked companies was analyzed using a two-dimensional grid for Web site evaluation. Results indicate that there is a need for improvement in the design and quality of the Web sites of manufacturing firms in the Philippines.

About one-third of the large establishments make it to the list of the Philippines’ Top 1000 Corporations, which is published annually by BusinessWorld and its predecessor, Business Day, in cooperation with the Securities and Exchange Commission (SEC). From 1970 to 2009, industrial sector has consistently dominated the list of Top 1000 corporations.

During pandemic, the drop in gross income mirrored a drop in economic output following the outbreak of the coronavirus disease 2019 (COVID-19) pandemic. In actual terms, the Philippine economy fell by 9.6% in 2020 (-8.1 percent in current prices), the lowest result since the 1940s. Manila Electric Co. (Meralco) took the top rank in this year's edition with gross revenues of P266.055 billion, down 13.9 percent from P309.090 billion the previous year. San Miguel Corp. and SM Investments Corp.'s combined business units came in second and third, with gross earnings of P773.569 billion (-27.6%) and P396.751 billion (-21.7%), respectively. 370 international corporations made the list, accounting for 37.1 percent of the top 1000's total gross revenue this year. Its total revenue

BusinessWorld researchers use a "tickmarking" guide in their methodology for the Top 1000 publication, which is a way for them to identify items considered as the net sales, cost of sales, debt, or inventory in the financial statements since such items would depend on the industry where companies belong.
