= Philippine Center for Investigative Journalism =

Filipino non-profit organisation

- Founded: 1989; 37 years ago
- Focus: Investigative journalism
- Headquarters: No. 11 Matimtiman Street, UP Village Central 1101, Diliman, Quezon City, Philippines
- Website: https://pcij.org/

The Philippine Center for Investigative Journalism (PCIJ) is a non-profit media organization specializing in investigative journalism. It is based in Quezon City, Philippines. Established in 1989 by nine Filipino journalists, the organization funds investigative projects for both the print and broadcast media.

It has published over 1,000 investigative reports and over 1,000 articles in Philippine newspapers and magazines, produced documentaries and published more than two dozen books on current issues. The center also offers writing fellowships to deserving reporters, journalists, and academics.

PCIJ is one of three Philippine organizations belonging to the Global Investigative Journalism Network.

== History ==
=== Beginnings ===
Sheila Coronel, Petronilo Daroy, Lorna Kalaw-Tirol, Malou Mangahas, Horacio Severino, Rosario Tanedo, Rigoberto Tiglao, Marites Vitug, and Virgilio Vitug founded the Philippine Center for Investigative Journalism in 1989.

=== 1990s ===
In 1990, PCIJ published Kudeta: the Challenge to Philippine Democracy, a joint collaboration with the Photojournalists' Guild of the Philippines. It examined the Philippine Military, its rebel factions, the civil government, and society. The book won a Best Book Award from the Catholic Mass Media Awards.

In 1999, PCIJ published Her Stories: Investigative Reports on Filipino Women in the 1990s. It presented articles from reputable newspapers across the nation, examining the viewpoints of women across various sectors.

=== 2010s ===
In 2016, PCIJ organized a series of workshops on investigating election finance, funded by the National Endowment for Democracy.

In 2017, PCIJ launched the PCIJ Story Project. It provides grants for projects that expose human rights abuses, misuse of public funds, and threats to free expression and press freedom.

== Organization ==
A board of editors, mostly composed of the center's founders, holds monthly meetings. A board of advisers also convenes to help determine the direction the center's endeavors will take. The center employs a 13-person staff headed by an executive director. The staff also includes five journalists, an office manager, a marketing coordinator, a researcher, and a librarian.

== Awards ==
The PCIJ has been awarded nine National Book Awards, a Catholic Mass Media Award, and dozens of Jaime V. Ongpin Awards for Investigative Journalism.

The PCIJ has also won the Agence France-Presse's Kate Webb Award and the AJA Award for Press Freedom from the Asia Journalist Association.

== See also ==
- Center for Investigative Reporting
- Center for Investigative Reporting (Bosnia-Herzegovina)
- List of journalists killed in the Philippines
