= Interaksyon =

Philippine news website

- Website type: News website, aggregation
- Available in: English
- Owner: Philstar Global Corporation (MediaQuest Holdings)
- Editor: Camille Diola (Editor-in-chief)
- Website: interaksyon.com
- Commercial: Yes
- Launched: 2011; 15 years ago
- Current status: Active

Interaksyon (stylized in all lowercase) is a Philippine digital news website owned by Philstar Global Corporation, a subsidiary of MediaQuest Holdings's Philstar Media Group (Hastings Holdings). The website contains news aggregation from Philstar Media Group's properties such as The Philippine Star and BusinessWorld, as well as human-interest stories.

Interaksyon is headed by Philstar Global president and chief executive officer Kevin Belmonte.

== History ==
It was launched in 2011 as a news portal of TV5 Network's news division despite the latter's having launched its own news portal website News5 Everywhere.

Following the media company's loss of revenues, TV5 decided to shut down the InterAksyon website by March 2018. However, TV5 transferred ownership of InterAksyon to sister company Philstar Media Group, which currently runs the site under Philstar Global since March 2018.

== See also ==
- Aksyon (TV program)
- The Philippine Star
- BusinessWorld
