= Dungka! =

- Promotional graphic

Song by SB19

from the EP Simula at Wakas
- Language: Filipino
- Released: April 25, 2025
- Genre: Pop
- Length: 3:35
- Label: Sony Philippines
- Songwriter: John Paulo Nase
- Producers: John Paulo Nase; Joshua Daniel Nase

Music video
- "Dungka!" on YouTube

"Dungka!" (stylized in all uppercase) is a song recorded by the Filipino boy band SB19 for their third extended play (EP), Simula at Wakas (2025). The band's leader, Pablo, wrote the song and co-produced it with his brother Joshua Daniel Nase. It is an pop diss track aimed at haters, with lyrics demanding them to leave, uttering the phrase "doon ka" (lit. 'go over there'). "Dungka!" is listed as the sixth track on the EP, which Sony Music Philippines released on April 25, 2025.

"Dungka!" received favorable reviews from music critics, who complimented Pablo's songwriting and his use of wordplay. The song was an entry to record charts; it peaked at number 21 on the Philippines Hot 100 and number 7 on Billboard's World Digital Song Sales. The accompanying music video, directed by Kerbs Balagtas, featured Filipino culture and depicted the band in the streets showing allegiance to their community while opposing an antagonist who threatened the locals. SB19 promoted the song with live performances and included it on the set list of their Simula at Wakas World Tour (2025). "Dungka!" received multiple accolades, including a Filipino Music Award for Pop Song of the Year.

== Background and release ==
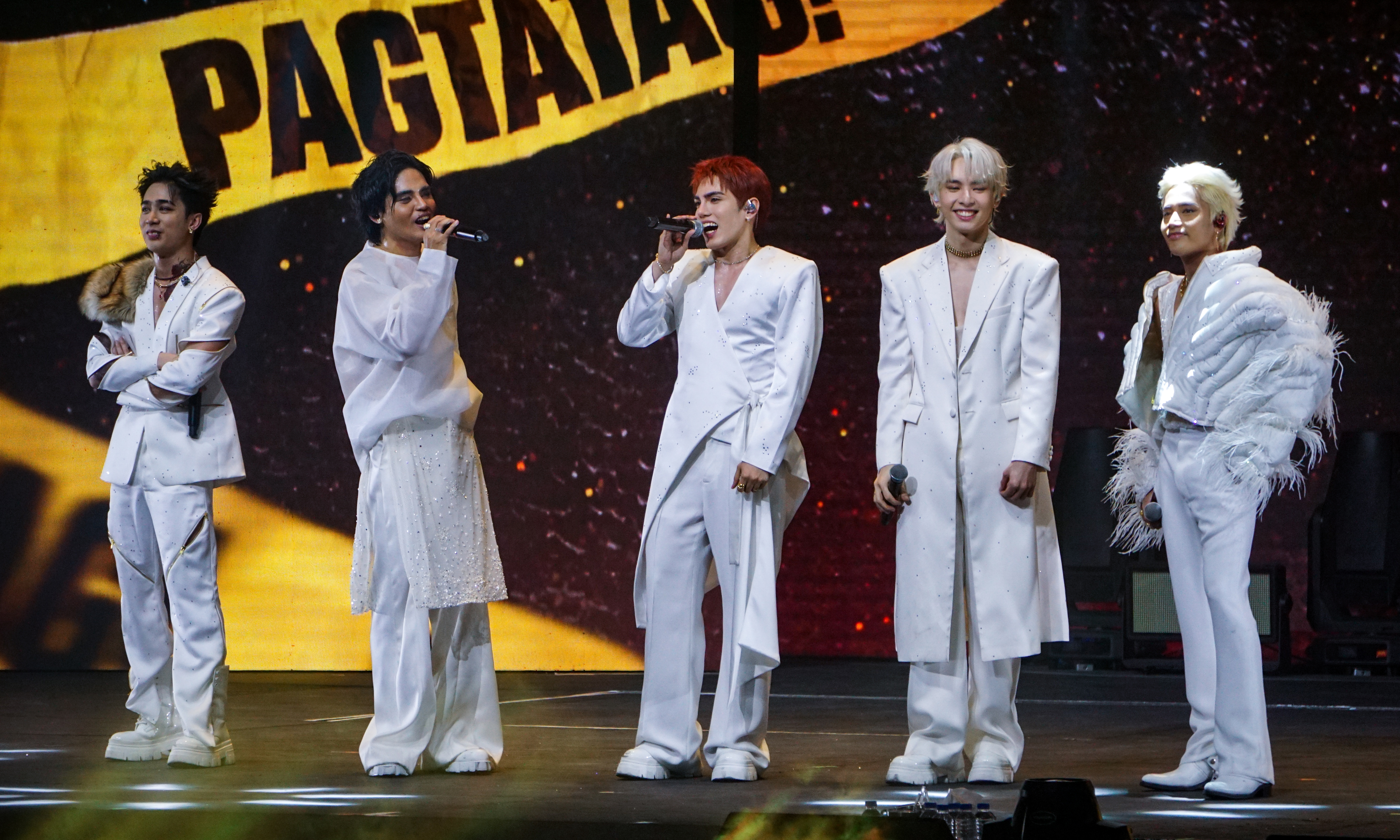
SB19 during the Pagtatag! World Tour in 2023

The Filipino boy band SB19 released their first extended play (EP), Pagsibol (lit. 'growth'), in 2021, exploring genres such as pop rock, hip-hop, and EDM, departing from the dance-pop production from their debut studio album, Get in the Zone (2020). Pablo, the band's leader, revealed in an interview with Zach Sang that Pagsibol and their future releases are part of a trilogy, the others being Pagtatag! (lit. 'strengthening') and Simula at Wakas (lit. 'beginning and end'). In 2023, the group released their second EP, Pagtatag!, the trilogy's second installment. The EP includes the single, "Gento" (2023), which scored their first entry to two record charts, including in the Philippines, where the single peaked at number 11. The following year, they confirmed during the premiere night for Pagtatag!: The Documentary (2024) that they are currently working with Simula at Wakas.

On January 31, 2025, SB19 published a trailer via their social media accounts. In it, they revealed the title of their third EP, Simula and Wakas, and announced its release date. The EP's lead single, "Dam", was released ahead of the EP on February 28, achieving commercial success. On April 7, the band announced the EP's track list, along with the names of the songwriters and producers involved in the record. Out of seven tracks in the EP, "Dungka!" is listed as track six. Sony Music Philippines released Simula at Wakas on April 25 through digital download and streaming formats.

== Composition and lyrics ==
"Dungka!"
"Dungka!" is a diss track with lyrics urging haters to go away. Music critics noted the song's loud production.

"Dungka!" is 3 minutes and 35 seconds in length. Pablo, the band's leader, wrote the song by himself and co-produced it with his brother Joshua Daniel Nase; they also mixed and mastered the song together. The song's title, "Dungka!", is a wordplay derived from the Filipino phrase "doon ka", which translates to "go over there" in English, a motif that served as a refrain in the song's lyrics. Musically, it is a pop song with elements of techno, hyperpop and rave music, accompanied by catchy pounding beats. Rome Saenz of Billboard Philippines described the song's production as "blaring [and] sharp", while Rafael Bautista of Nylon Manila and Preview's Kyla Villena describing it as "loud".

Lyrically, "Dungka!" is interpreted as a diss track against SB19's haters, responding to the criticisms and name-calling imposed on them, and those who are doubting their capabilities. In the lyrics, the phrase "doon ka" is prominent, a common Filipino expression that signifies displeasure, which was used in the song to convey that negativity and undesirable people are unwelcome and should leave. Other lyrics also follow a similar theme, like "Kung 'di mo 'to gusto, tumabi ka d'yan" (lit. 'If you do not like this, move out of the way'), further insisting that their critics should go away.

== Reception ==
"Dungka!" received favorable reviews from music critics, many of whom complimented Pablo's songwriting. Writing for The Philippine Star, Kathleen Llemit noted Pablo's preference for using wordplay, adding that she considers it a "testament to [his] songwriting skills". Ann Jenireene Gomez of the Daily Tribune described the use of wordplay "witty" and a "cheeky way to shoo away negative energy", while Dayne Aduna of VMan Southeast Asia regard it as a playful way to alter an everyday Filipino phrase. The song's noisy production was also a key topic, with critics noting that, despite it sounding loud, Nylon Manila's Rafael Bautista opined that the noise still resonates in a good way. Rome Saenz of Billboard Philippines considered the song "irresistibly catchy", despite its noisy production. Inquirer's Pauline Miranda also compared it with the group's 2021 single "Bazinga", which she referred to as its "more fun [and] unbothered brother". Bandwagon's Hidzir Junaini opined that "Dungka!" is a surprising track in the EP, while Bautista finds it as one of the tracks that stood out from Simula at Wakas.

Commercially, "Dungka!" was an entry for SB19 on record charts upon the release of Simula at Wakas. In the Philippines, the song entered two Billboard Philippines charts, debuting and peaking at number 21 on the Philippines Hot 100 and number 14 on the Top Philippine Songs during the week of May 10, 2025. The song spent a total of 12 weeks on the Philippines Hot 100 and 3 weeks on the Top Philippine Songs charts. In the same week, the song debuted and peaked at number seven on Billboard's World Digital Song Sales chart, marking their third entry on the chart, following "Gento" and "Dam".

== Accolades ==
Awards and nominations for "Dungka!"
Award	Year	Category	Result	Ref.
Awit Awards	2026	Song of the Year	Nominated	
Awit Awards	2026	Best Dance/Electronic Recording	Won	
Awit Awards	2026	Best Pop Recording	Won	
Awit Awards	2026	Best Music Video	Won	
Filipino Music Awards	2025	Pop Song of the Year	Won	
Filipino Music Awards	2025	People's Choice Awards – Song	Won	
P-pop Music Awards	2025	Song of the Year	Won	
P-pop Music Awards	2025	Best Choreography in a Live Performance	Won	
Wish 107.5 Music Awards	2026	Wish Pop Song of the Year	Won	

== Music video ==
Kerbs Balagtas directed the accompanying music video for "Dungka!", which was surprise-released on April 25, 2025, on YouTube, the same day as the release of Simula at Wakas. The music video is themed around street credibility and is set in the chaotic streets of Metro Manila, depicting SB19 showing their allegiance to the local community. They were circumventing around the antagonist, played by social media personality Ghost Wrecker, who taunts and threatens the locals, with people later coming together to oppose him. The video also showed activities relevant to the Filipino culture, including Zumba, street food, activism, street basketball, karaoke, ten-twenty, and band members participating in a battle rap. The group also gathered together to raise social awareness, raising posters and signs with text including "Iangat ang sining na Pilipino" (lit. 'Elevate Filipino art') and "Sining ang sandata sa kulturang mapagpalaya" (lit. 'Art is the weapon in a liberating culture').

The music video received favorable reviews for depicting Filipino culture. It was regarded as a tribute to individuality, community, diversity, and everyday life, while calling out negativity and raising one's voice for change. Writers highlighted a scene from the video where the antagonist was eating a crab, which they interpreted as a symbol for crab mentality among Filipinos. The video featured a large number of celebrity cameos, with Rafael Bautista of Nylon Manila considering it the band's "most star-studded music video". Aside from Ghost Wrecker, the ensemble cast includes comedian Vice Ganda, actress and singer Maymay Entrata, Ben&Ben members Pat Lasaten and Agnes Reoma, rappers Shehyee and Smugglaz, cosplayer Alodia Gosiengfiao, gamer Jayat, and social media personalities Kween Yasmin, Malupiton, Mimiyuuuh, and Sassa Gurl, all of whom the band had collaborated with to help spread a message about diversity and uniqueness among people, including those in the LGBTQ community.

== Live performances and other use ==
Following the release of Simula at Wakas, SB19 arranged a surprise flash mob in Bonifacio Global City in Taguig on April 25 and performed the song with "Dam". The band followed it with a television performance of "Dungka!" during their appearance on the variety show It's Showtime on April 26. On May 7, the group appeared on the Wish 107.5 Bus, performing a three-song set list. It includes "Dungka!", which they performed it on a makeshift stage outside the bus. In support of the EP, SB19 embarked on their third world tour, the Simula at Wakas World Tour (2025), with the song included on its set list.

SB19 appeared at the Hito Music Awards 2025 in Taiwan on June 21, performing the song during the ceremony. The band went to Rome, Italy and served as a guest performer at the Sama sa Roma 2025 event on October 12, where "Dungka!" among the songs they performed. On November 30, the group performed the song during their halftime show at the Honor of Kings International Championship 2025 held at the Ayala Malls Manila Bay in Parañaque. Shortly after, they went to Kaohsiung, Taiwan to perform at the ACON 2025 festival held at the Kaohsiung National Stadium on December 7, where they performed four songs, including "Dungka!".

In other uses, a snippet of the song was featured in a video uploaded in June by FIFA on TikTok. The song was also featured in a music video for the 2025 video game Fatal Fury: City of the Wolves.

== Credits and personnel ==
Credits are adapted from the song's music video.

- SB19 – vocals
- W3 – additional vocals
- John Paulo Nase – songwriter, producer, mixing, mastering
- Joshua Daniel Nase – producer, mixing, mastering

== Charts ==
=== Weekly charts ===
Weekly peak chart positions for "Dungka!"
Chart (2025)	Peak position
Philippines (Philippines Hot 100)	21
Philippines (Top Philippine Songs)	14
US World Digital Song Sales (Billboard)	7

=== Monthly charts ===
Monthly peak chart positions for "Dungka!"
Chart (2025)	Peak position
Philippines (Top P-pop Songs)	3

== Listicles ==
Name of publisher, year listed, name of listicle, and placement
Publisher	Year	Listicle	Placement	Ref.
Billboard Philippines	2025	25 Best Filipino Songs of 2025	Placed	
