= Simula at Wakas World Tour =

2025 concert tour by SB19

- World tour by SB19
- Promotional poster
- Location: Asia; North America; Oceania
- Associated album: Simula at Wakas
- Start date: May 31, 2025
- End date: December 14, 2025
- No. of shows: 21
- Guests: Benjamin Kheng; Aruma

SB19 tour chronology
- Pagtatag! World Tour (2023); Simula at Wakas World Tour (2025)

The Simula at Wakas World Tour was the third world tour headlined by the Filipino boy band SB19 to support their third extended play (EP) Simula at Wakas (2025). The tour, comprising 21 shows, commenced on May 31, 2025 at the Philippine Arena in Bulacan, with stops in Asia, North America, the Middle East, and Oceania. The tour concluded in Australia on December 14, 2025.

== Background and development ==
Following the conclusion of the successful Pagtatag! World Tour, SB19 released their first full-length documentary film, Pagtatag! The Documentary, in theaters. During the film’s premiere night, the band's leader, Pablo, revealed that the group was working on their third EP Simula at Wakas.

On January 31, 2025, SB19 released an official trailer across their social media platforms unveiling Simula at Wakas as the title of their third EP. The trailer also revealed key dates, including the EP’s release, the launch of its lead single, and the kickoff of an accompanying world tour to promote the project.

The world tour, consisting of 21 shows as of November 2025, commenced with a two-night kickoff concert at the Philippine Arena in Bulacan on May 31 and June 1. Other shows have included key cities in the United States and Canada, Asian stops spanning Taiwan, Singapore, Hong Kong, Japan, and Thailand, as well as shows in Dubai and Doha. An Oceania leg with stops in Australia and New Zealand is scheduled in December 2025.

== Ticket sales ==
=== Kickoff Shows ===
SM Tickets handled the ticket sales for the kickoff shows in the Philippines, with ticket prices ranging from ₱1,000 to ₱15,000. The first show quickly sold out within just a few hours of ticket release, making SB19 the first Filipino act to sell out the Philippine Arena in a day. Due to unprecedented demand, a second day was announced for the show on June 1, 2025. Ticket sales for the second date began on April 15.

=== US and Canada ===
For the North American shows, ticket sales were managed by Ticketmaster. Sales began on March 19, with the San Francisco, Los Angeles, and Toronto dates selling out immediately.

== Transportation ==
In preparation for the expected high traffic volume due to the kickoff concerts, North Luzon Expressway Corporation (NLEX) issued a traffic advisory for May 31 and June 1 encouraging concert-goers to take the NLEX Ciudad de Victoria exit, while urging other motorists headed to Bocaue or Santa Maria to use alternate routes via exits in Marilao, Bocaue, or Tambubong.

== Accolades ==
Awards and nominations for Simula at Wakas World Tour
Award	Year	Category	Result	Ref.
Filipino Music Awards	2025	Concert of the Year	Won	
Filipino Music Awards	2025	Tour of the Year	Won	
P-pop Music Awards	2025	Concert of the Year	Won	

== Set list ==
This set list was taken from the kickoff show in the Philippines on May 31 and June 1, 2025. It does not represent all shows throughout the tour.

1. "What?"
2. "Mana"
3. "Gento"
4. "Moonlight"
5. "I Want You"
6. "Golden Hour (SB19 Remix)"
7. "WYAT (Where You At)"
8. "Dungka!"
9. "Bazinga"
10. "8TonBall"
11. "Crimzone"
12. "Nyebe"
13. "Time"
14. "Ilaw"
15. "Quit"
16. "Mapa"
17. "Shooting for the Stars"
18. "Freedom"
19. "SLMT"
20. "Dam"

=== Guest performers ===
- During the August 24, 2025 concert in Singapore, Singaporean singer-songwriter Benjamin Kheng joined SB19 on stage for a performance of "I Want You". The group was later joined by Aruma for a Bahasa Indonesia cover of "Mapa".

== Tour dates ==
List of concert tour dates, showing city, country, and venue
Date (2025)	City	Country	Venue
May 31	Santa Maria (Note: Labeled as Bulacan in the promotional material.)	Philippines	Philippine Arena
June 1	Santa Maria	Philippines	Philippine Arena
June 29	New Taipei City (Note: Labeled as Taipei in the promotional material.)	Taiwan	Zepp New Taipei
July 11	Redwood City (Note: Labeled as San Francisco in the promotional material.)	United States	Fox Theatre
July 13	Anaheim (Note: Labeled as Los Angeles in the promotional material.)	United States	City National Grove of Anaheim
July 18	Pickering (Note: Labeled as Toronto in the promotional material.)	Canada	The Arena
July 20	Calgary	Canada	Grey Eagle Resort Casino
July 26	Vancouver	Canada	The Centre for Performing Arts
July 27	Temecula	United States	Pechanga Resort Casino
August 1	Honolulu	United States	Hawaii Convention Center
August 24	Singapore		Arena @ Expo
September 13	Hong Kong		Macpherson Stadium
September 14	Hong Kong		Macpherson Stadium
September 24	Tokyo	Japan	Zepp Haneda
October 11	Dubai	United Arab Emirates	Coca-Cola Arena
October 17	Doha	Qatar	Qatar National Convention Centre
November 2	Bangkok	Thailand	CentralWorld Live
December 5	Melbourne	Australia	Melbourne Town Hall
December 6	Norwest (Note: Labeled as Sydney in the promotional material.)	Australia	Norwest Convention Centre
December 12	Auckland	New Zealand	The Trusts Arena
December 14	Perth	Australia	Red Hill Auditorium

=== Cancelled shows ===
List of cancelled concert tour dates, showing city, country, venue, and reason for cancellation
Date (2025)	City	Country	Venue	Reason
October 9	Riyadh	Saudi Arabia	InterContinental Durrat Al Riyadh	Unforeseen circumstances
