= Filipino Music Awards 2025 =

2025 awards ceremony for music

- Official poster
- Date: October 21, 2025
- Venue: SM Mall of Asia Arena; Pasay, Metro Manila
- Country: Philippines
- Presented by: Modern Media Group, Inc.
- Hosted by: Joey Mead King; Michael Sager; Elijah Canlas
- Preshow host: Aiyana Perlas
- Acts: SB19; Ben&Ben; Ely Buendia; Cup of Joe; Lolita Carbon; Yeng Constantino; Philippine Philharmonic Orchestra; Gloc-9; Maxie; apl.de.ap; Fana; Illest Morena; Bini; Maki; BGYO; IV of Spades

Highlights
- Most wins: SB19 (6)
- Most nominations: SB19 (9)
- Total: 18 categories
- Website: filipinomusicawards.com

Television coverage
- Network: TV5
- Produced by: AGC Power Holdings, Inc.
- Directed by: Johnny Manahan

The 1st Filipino Music Awards ceremony, presented by the Modern Media Group, Inc. (MMGI), took place on October 21, 2025, at the SM Mall of Asia Arena in Pasay, Metro Manila. During the ceremony, the MMGI presented the Filipino Music Awards (FMAs) in 18 categories to honor the best of Filipino music. Directed by Johnny Manahan, the ceremony was delay broadcast in the Philippines on TV5. Model Joey Mead King and actors Michael Sager and Elijah Canlas hosted the show, while Aiyana Perlas hosted the red carpet.

SB19 emerged as the night's biggest winner, winning six awards, including Artist of the Year; their Simula at Wakas World Tour also won Concert of the Year and Tour of the Year. Cup of Joe followed by two awards, winning Album of the Year and Song of the Year for Silakbo and "Multo", respectively. Jose Mari Chan received the Lifetime Achievement Award while Pilita Corrales was posthumously awarded the Tribute Award. Bini, Dionela, TJ Monterde, Hev Abi, IV of Spades and Maki also received multiple nominations.

== Winners and nominees ==
=== Awards ===
List of nominees are adapted from Billboard Philippines and Inquirer. Winners are listed first, highlighted in boldface, and indicated with a double dagger (‡).

==== Grand Awards ====
**Artist of the Year**: **SB19 ‡**; Cup of Joe; Earl Agustin; Bini; TJ Monterde	**Album of the Year**: **Silakbo – Cup of Joe ‡**; Method Adaptor – Ely Buendia; Simula at Wakas – SB19; Himig at Pag-ibig – Earl Agustin; Biniverse – Bini
**Song of the Year**: **"Multo" – Cup of Joe ‡**; "Marilag" – Dionela; "Dam" – SB19; "Aura" – IV of Spades; "Kalimutan Ka" – Skusta Clee	**Music Company of the Year**: **Sony Music Philippines ‡**; ABS-CBN Music; Cornerstone Entertainment; Live Nation Philippines; Viva Records
**Concert of the Year**: **Simula at Wakas World Tour Kickoff – SB19 ‡**; Silakbo – Cup of Joe; Reset – Regine Velasquez; Pure Energy: One More Time – Gary Valenciano; Sarili Nating Mundo at the Big Dome – TJ Monterde	**Tour of the Year**: **Simula at Wakas World Tour – SB19 ‡**; Biniverse World Tour 2025 – Bini; Sobrang Downtown Tour – Hev Abi; Huling El Bimbo World Tour – Eraserheads; Sarili Nating Mundo World Tour – TJ Monterde

==== Genre Awards ====
**R&B Song of the Year**: **"Marilag" – Dionela ‡**; "Fool Me Twice" – Jess Connelly; "Ikigai" – Dionela, Loonie; "Magic" – Jason Dhakal; "Segundo, Siguro" – Arthur Nery	**Hip-hop Song of the Year**: **"Gubat na Siyudad" – Morobeats ‡**; "Gusto Ko Sakin Ka Lang" – Robledo Timido; "Man in the Mirror" – Waiian; "My Day" – Hellmerry; "Subomoto" (Hev Abi remix) – Zae, Hev Abi
**Folk Song of the Year**: **"Sampung mga Daliri" – Dwta, Justin ‡**; "Aking Diwata" – Noel Cabangon; "Lalim" – Mateo; "Sa Bawat Sandali" – Amiel Sol; "Saranggola" – Ben&Ben	**Rock Song of the Year**: **"Aura" – IV of Spades ‡**; "Biktima" – Chicosci; "Hari ng Kapalpakan" – Blaster; "Kandarapa" – Ely Buendia; "Verdugo" – Juggernaut
**Alternative Song of the Year**: **"I.N.A.S." – Zild ‡**; "Basura" – Sandwich, Suyen; "Mahal" – Dilaw; "Misbehave" – Lola Amour; "Telepono" – One Click Straight	**Pop Song of the Year**: **"Dungka!" – SB19 ‡**; "All These Ladies" – BGYO; "Namumula" – Maki; "Tanga" – Kaia; "Umaaligid" – Sarah Geronimo, SB19

==== People's Choice Awards ====
**People's Choice Awards – International Artist**: **J-Hope ‡**; Jennie; Justin Bieber; Katseye; Niki; Olivia Rodrigo; Sabrina Carpenter; Seventeen; SZA; Twice	**People's Choice Awards – Song**: **"Dungka!" – SB19 ‡**; "Aura" – IV of Spades; "Blink Twice" – Bini; "Daleng-Dale" – GAT; "Kalimutan Ka" – Skusta Clee; "Multo" – Cup of Joe; "Marilag" – Dionela; "My Day" – Hellmerry; "Namumula" – Maki; "Sa Bawat Sandali" – Amiel Sol
**People's Choice Awards – Artist**: **SB19 ‡**; Bini; Cup of Joe; December Avenue; Flow G; G22; Hev Abi; Maki; Rico Blanco; TJ Monterde

=== Legacy Awards ===
==== Lifetime Achievement Award ====
- Jose Mari Chan

==== Music Foundation of the Year ====
- Ang Misyon, Inc.

==== Tribute Award ====
- Pilita Corrales (posthumous)

=== Artists with multiple nominations and awards ===
Artists with multiple nominations
Nominations	Artist
9	SB19
6	Cup of Joe
5	Bini
4	Dionela
4	TJ Monterde
3	Hev Abi
3	IV of Spades
3	Maki

Artists with multiple wins
Awards	Artist
6	SB19
2	Cup of Joe

== Presenters ==
Presenters
Name(s)	Role	Ref.
Erik Santos	Presented the award for Pop Song of the Year	
Basti Artadi; Kevin Roy	Presented the award for Alternative Song of the Year	
Dilaw	Presented the award for Rock Song of the Year	
Adie; Arthur Nery	Presented the award for Folk Song of the Year	
Gloc-9	Presented the award for Hip-hop Song of the Year	
Kyla	Presented the award for R&B Song of the Year	
Darren Espanto	Presented the award for People's Choice Awards – Artist	
Ashtine Olviga	Presented the award for People's Choice Awards – Song	
Joao Constancia; Dylan Menor	Presented the award for People's Choice Awards – International Artist	
Jericho Rosales	Presented the award for Tribute Award	
Noel Cabangon	Presented the award for Music Foundation of the Year	
Michelle Dee; Jonathan Manalo	Presented the award for Lifetime Achievement Award	
Angeline Quinto	Presented the award for Tour of the Year	
Morissette	Presented the award for Concert of the Year	
Anne Bernisca	Presented the award for Music Company of the Year	
TJ Monterde; KZ Tandingan	Presented the award for Song of the Year	
Lola Amour	Presented the award for Album of the Year	
Ely Buendia	Presented the award for Artist of the Year	

== Performers ==
Performers
Name(s)	Song(s) performed	Ref.
IV of Spades	"Aura"	
BGYO	"All These Ladies" "Dance with Me"	
Maki	"Abelyana" "Kahel na Langit"	
Bini	"First Luv"	
apl.de.ap Fana; Illest Morena	"Wind It!"	
Maxie	"Tado" "Halika Na Lika Na"	
Gloc-9	"Upuan"	
Lolita Carbon; Yeng Constantino; Philippine Philharmonic Orchestra	"Masdan Mo ang Kapaligiran"	
Cup of Joe	"Multo"	
Ely Buendia	"Kandarapa"	
SB19	"Dam"	
Ben&Ben; SB19	"Kapangyarihan"	
