= Kween Yasmin =

Filipino social media personality (born 2000)

- Born: Yasmin Marie Malixi Asistido; October 2, 2000 (age 26); Imus, Cavite, Philippines
- Occupations: Internet personality, singer, content creator
- Years active: 2018–present
- Agent: Self-managed (formerly Viva Artists Agency)

Yasmin Marie Malixi Asistido (Tagalog pronunciation: [asɪsˈtɪdo]; born October 2, 2000), better known as Kween Yasmin, is a Filipino content creator, singer, and internet personality. She gained recognition in 2018 after posting a comic rendition of Ex Battalion’s song "Hayaan Mo Sila" which was shared extensively on Facebook and YouTube. Since then she has appeared on national television programs such as Kapuso Mo, Jessica Soho, I Juander, and Black Rider. Her 2023 impromptu spoken-word piece "Esophagus, Esophagus" became a popular internet meme.

== Early life and education ==
Yasmin Marie Asistido was born and raised in Cavite, Philippines, and grew up with her aunt and older sister in Bacoor. She studied Multimedia Arts in college in Dasmariñas. After experiencing bullying, she decided to leave school and focus on creating online content. Her mother, Mariflor Asistido, died in 2018, an event she later said influenced her determination to continue performing.

== Career ==
=== Online beginnings ===
Asistido began posting humorous covers and parodies in 2018. Her parody "Lalaking Manloloko" gained hundreds of thousands of views and helped her build an online following. During the COVID-19 pandemic she hosted live sessions to talk with her followers, whom she calls "Yasminnatics".

In 2021, Asistido went viral after failing to enter her own virtual fan meeting because the Zoom room reached its limit of 100 participants. The incident drew tens of thousands of reactions and was covered by several Philippine media outlets.

=== Television ===
In 2020, Asistido briefly signed with Viva Artists Agency but later ended the contract, saying she preferred to manage her own project.

Asistido has appeared in Kapuso Mo, Jessica Soho, I Juander, and the GMA Network series Black Rider.

=== Spoken-word and recent activities ===
In late 2023, Asistido's spontaneous spoken-word performance "Esophagus, Esophagus" on the podcast The Koolpals went viral and was reported on by several Philippine media outlets.

In 2025, Asistido appeared in ABS-CBN’s digital series EATsotik.

== Public image ==
Media have described Asistido as the “All-Purpose Kween” for her range of performances. SPOT.ph described her appeal as ‘natural and unfiltered. She has publicly expressed support for the LGBT community. On November 25, 2025, Canva Philippines published "All-Purpose Kween" fonts, such as Kweenmojis, Kween Sans (letters, numbers, and punctuation), and a collection of Yasmin's images for her own graphic. On November 27, Yasmin endorsed partnership with Canva.

== Personal life ==
Asistido lives in Cavite with her relatives. She has spoken about her mother's death and how it continues to motivate her. In March 2026, Asistido revealed that she had been in a relationship and that they were expecting their first child.

== Discography ==
Title	Type	Collaborators / Notes	Release date	Reference
"Marupok" ft. Lord Malvar	Single		February 9, 2024	
"Break Na Tayo"(Meowvolution album)	Album track	Originally by Meowfie ft. Kween Yasmin and Macoy Dubs	June 7, 2024	
"Oras na"	Single		November 8, 2024	
"Wapake"	Single	Originally by Kyo Quijano ft. Kween Yasmin	August 15, 2025	

== Filmography ==
=== Television ===
Year	Title	Role / Notes	Ref.
2023	Kapuso Mo, Jessica Soho	Herself / Guest	
2023	I Juander	Herself / Guest	
2023	Black Rider	Guest appearance	
2024	It's Showtime	Herself / Guest	

=== Music videos ===
Year	Title	Artist	Role	Ref.
2025	Dungka!	SB19	Cameo	
