= Dam (song) =

Single by SB19

from the EP Simula at Wakas
- Language: Tagalog; English
- Released: February 28, 2025
- Genre: Hip-hop
- Length: 3:29
- Label: Sony Philippines
- Songwriters: John Paulo Nase; Joshua Daniel Nase; Simon Servida
- Producers: John Paulo Nase; Joshua Daniel Nase; Simon Servida

SB19 singles chronology
"Kalakal" (2024)	"Dam" (2025)	"Umaaligid" (2025)

Music video
- "Dam" on YouTube

"Dam" (stylized in all uppercase) is a song recorded by the Filipino boy band SB19 for their third extended play (EP), Simula at Wakas (2025). The band's leader, Pablo, co-wrote and co-produced the song with Joshua Daniel Nase and Simon Servida. It is a hip-hop track with elements of EDM, folk, industrial, and progressive rock. In the lyrics, the narrator discusses his struggles and desire to become a better version of himself while upholding self-integrity and determination. The song was released by Sony Music Philippines on February 28, 2025, as the EP's lead single.

The single received favorable reviews from music critics, who praised the song's genre-blending and instrumentation. Critics also compared its music to the group's earlier releases, like "What?" (2021) and "Gento" (2023). The single achieved commercial success, peaking at number four on the Philippines Hot 100 and at number one on Billboard's World Digital Song Sales—becoming the first song by a Filipino artist to top the chart. Elsewhere, "Dam" peaked at the top 10 in the United Arab Emirates and the top 20 in the Middle East and North Africa and Saudi Arabia.

The accompanying music video—directed by Alanshiii—is set in a dark, medieval fantasy world. It depicts the members of SB19 as mythical creatures, attempting to save a tree of life. The video received praise for its visuals and production, and became one of the most-viewed music videos by a Filipino artist in its first 24 hours of release on YouTube. To promote "Dam", an installation art was displayed in Taguig and the band performed the song live on television and numerous other occasions. The group also included the track on the set list of their Simula at Wakas World Tour (2025). "Dam" was nominated for Song of the Year at the Filipino Music Awards 2025.

== Background and release ==
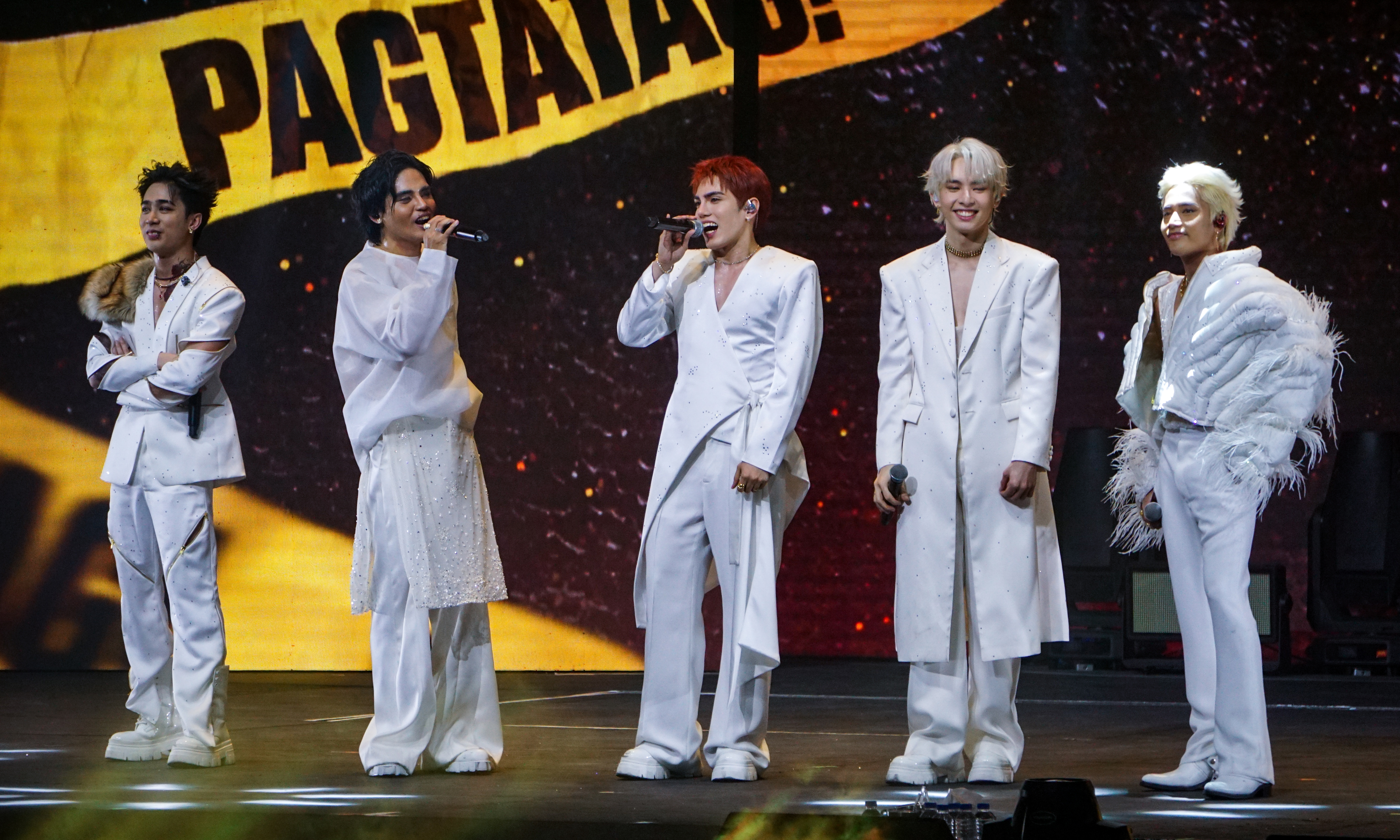
SB19 during the Pagtatag! World Tour in 2023

The Filipino boy band SB19 released their first extended play (EP), Pagsibol (lit. 'growth'), in 2021. The EP incorporates genres such as pop rock, hip-hop, and EDM, departing from the dance-pop production of their debut studio album, Get in the Zone (2020). The band followed Pagsibol with the release of their second EP, Pagtatag! (lit. 'strengthening'), in 2023. The EP includes the single, "Gento" (2023), which scored their first entry to two record charts, including in the Philippines, where the single peaked at number eight. Shortly after the EP release, they left their talent agency, ShowBT Entertainment, and transitioned to self-management, stating that now they have complete artistic control over their music. They also revealed that their previous two EPs are part of a planned trilogy. The following year, SB19 members temporarily focused on their solo careers. They later attended the premiere night of Pagtatag! The Documentary (2024), during which the group confirmed that they have begun working and preparing for the trilogy's third and final installment, titled Simula at Wakas (lit. 'beginning and end').

On January 31, 2025, SB19 published a trailer for Simula at Wakas, their third EP, via their social media accounts. In it, the band announced that the EP would be released on April 25. The trailer also indicated that Simula at Wakas would be preceded by a lead single, which was untitled at the time. The group released teaser photos in the days leading up to the single's release. They revealed the title, "Dam", on February 17. Sony Music Philippines released "Dam" on February 28, through digital download and streaming formats. On the track list of Simula at Wakas, the single served as its opening track. A live recording of the song from the First Take was released on November 28 via digital download and streaming formats. "Dam" was also included on SB19's second studio album, Wakas at Simula (2026), as part of a compilation of the band's previous works.

== Composition and lyrics ==
"Dam"
The song's bridge, featuring strong bass beats and elements of various genres. It transitions to the chorus with a high note.

"Dam" is 3 minutes and 29 seconds long, while its extended version is 25 seconds longer. SB19's leader, Pablo, co-wrote and co-produced the song with his brother Joshua Daniel Nase and record producer Simon Servida. Nase and Servida had previously worked with the band on their first two EPs, Pagsibol and Pagtatag!. Heo Chan-goo of Knob Sound Korea mixed and mastered the recording, with assistance from Lee Oh-won. Musically, "Dam" is primarily a hip-hop song, incorporating elements of EDM, Celtic and Filipino folk, industrial, and progressive rock. Its production features strong bass beats, described by some writers have described as powerful and anthemic, alongside high-note, battle cry-style vocals. The song's title, "Dam", is a wordplay derived from the Tagalog word "pakiramdam", meaning "feeling" in English.

The lyrics draw inspiration from misfortune and the process of accepting it, which SB19 stated stemmed from their past experiences and career goals. The lyrics reflects on one's inner struggles and explores the idea of staying true to one's values and principles when pursuing ambition and purpose, despite the challenges and sacrifices involved. The song also conveys that aspirations and goals shall remain steadfast regardless of fate. "Dam" includes lines that emphasize accountability for pursuing one's ambition and confessing fault for wanting: "Kasalanan ko lahat ng 'to/ 'Lang humpay sa paggusto" (lit. 'This is all my fault/ Never ending desire'). The lyrics also contain questions, one on how one can surpass their peak: "Paano ba higitan ang sagad na?" (lit. 'How does one exceed the best?'), suggesting that even at one's highest point, there is a drive to go further, while "Ano'ng pakiramdam?" (lit. 'How does it feel?') implies that a sense of struggle accompanies the pursuit of success.

== Critical reception ==
"Dam" received favorable reviews from music critics, with praise mainly on the song's instrumentation. Journalists Kristofer Purnell of The Philippine Star and Bandwagon's Hidzir Junaini observed genre-blending in the track, which they lauded for seamlessly blending different genres. Junaini further added that he finds SB19's approach to sound creation "innovative". Some writers opined that the song felt distinctive, with Inquirer's Pauline Miranda, attributing it to the genre-blending and texturing in its instrumentation, which also made the track engaging to listen to. Billboard's Jeff Benjamin considered the song "one of [SB19's] tightest singles yet", noting that the track juxtaposes light pop elements and intense gritty sound in its production. The group's desire to explore genres has been highlighted by some critics, especially in "Dam", which they find admirable.

Comparing "Dam" to SB19's past music, Purnell and Junaini considered "Dam" musically similar to their previous singles "What?" (2021) and "Gento" (2023). They noted similar musical elements and energy, which they regard as a signature sound for the band. Conversely, Alwin Ignacio of the Daily Tribune suggests that the song felt more powerful among the group's 2021 releases like "What", "Mana", and "Bazinga". Writing for the Grammy Awards, Ivana Morales considered the single a "new rebirth" for SB19 and finds it "game-changing", stating that the band has embodied their desire for complete artistic control of their career. Reflecting on Simula at Wakas as a whole, Rome Saenz of Billboard Philippines opined that the single was able to set the tone of what the EP can offer, a record he described as a collection of distinct songs.

== Commercial performance ==
Upon release, "Dam" achieved commercial success. A day after its release, the single recorded one million streams in a single day on Spotify. In the week of March 15, 2025, it debuted atop Billboard's World Digital Song Sales chart, marking their second entry and first number-one song on the chart. This made them the first Filipino artist to top the chart. The song spent four non-consecutive weeks total on the chart. In the Philippines, "Dam" entered two Billboard Philippines charts, debuting and peaking at number four on the Philippines Hot 100 and number three on the Top Philippine Songs, marking their first entry on both. It managed to spend a total of 23 weeks on the Philippines Hot 100 and 17 weeks on the Top Philippine Songs. The track also entered the Official Philippines Chart by the International Federation of the Phonographic Industry (IFPI), where it debuted and peaked at number five, and spent six weeks on the chart.

Elsewhere, in the same week, "Dam" debuted and peaked at number 12 on the chart for the Middle East and North Africa region, charting for a total of two weeks. The single also entered the charts in the United Arab Emirates, debuting and peaking at number 7, and in Saudi Arabia, debuting and peaking at number 17. The track spent four weeks on the former. Outside Asia, "Dam" entered the UK's Singles Downloads and Singles Sales chart, debuting and peaking at number 4 on both—charting for two and three consecutive weeks, respectively—and New Zealand's Hot Singles chart, where it peaked at number 21.

== Accolades ==
Awards and nominations for "Dam"
Award	Year	Category	Result	Ref.
Awit Awards	2026	Record of the Year	Nominated	
Awit Awards	2026	Best Performance by a Group	Nominated	
Awit Awards	2026	Best Pop Recording	Nominated	
Awit Awards	2026	Best Musical Arrangement Recording	Nominated	
Awit Awards	2026	Best Music Video	Nominated	
BreakTudo Awards	2025	International Video of the Year	Nominated	
Filipino Music Awards	2025	Song of the Year	Nominated	
P-pop Music Awards	2025	Song of the Year	Nominated	
P-pop Music Awards	2025	Music Video of the Year	Won	
Wish 107.5 Music Awards	2026	Wishclusive Pop Performance of the Year	Won	

== Music video ==
A scene in the "Dam" music video depicting SB19 standing in front of a giant tree in a barren land.

Alanshiii directed the music video for "Dam", which premiered on YouTube on February 28, 2025, the same day as the song's release. For the video, SB19 wanted to try something new, distant from what they have done in their past works. Inspired by Greek mythology, the band landed on a concept about gods and the Middle Ages, which they felt suited the song's epic sound. The group collaborated with the creative team 1032 Lab in conceptualizing and producing the video, which involves the use of computer-generated imagery. The video was set in a dark, medieval fantasy world, depicting SB19 as mythical creatures and warriors. In the video, each member is by themselves confronting their own battles. They later came together to save a tree of life, sacrificing themselves by morphing into stone, which made the tree bear fruit.

Following its release, the music video received praise for its visuals and production. Its theme drew comparisons to the productions Game of Thrones (2011–2019), The Lord of the Rings (2001–2003), and Dungeon & Dragons (2000–2023). Ivana Morales, writing for the Grammy Awards, considered the video "colossal in scale". The video has garnered over four million views in the first 24 hours since its release on YouTube, making it among the most-viewed music videos by a Filipino artist in a single day on the platform.

== Live performances and other use ==
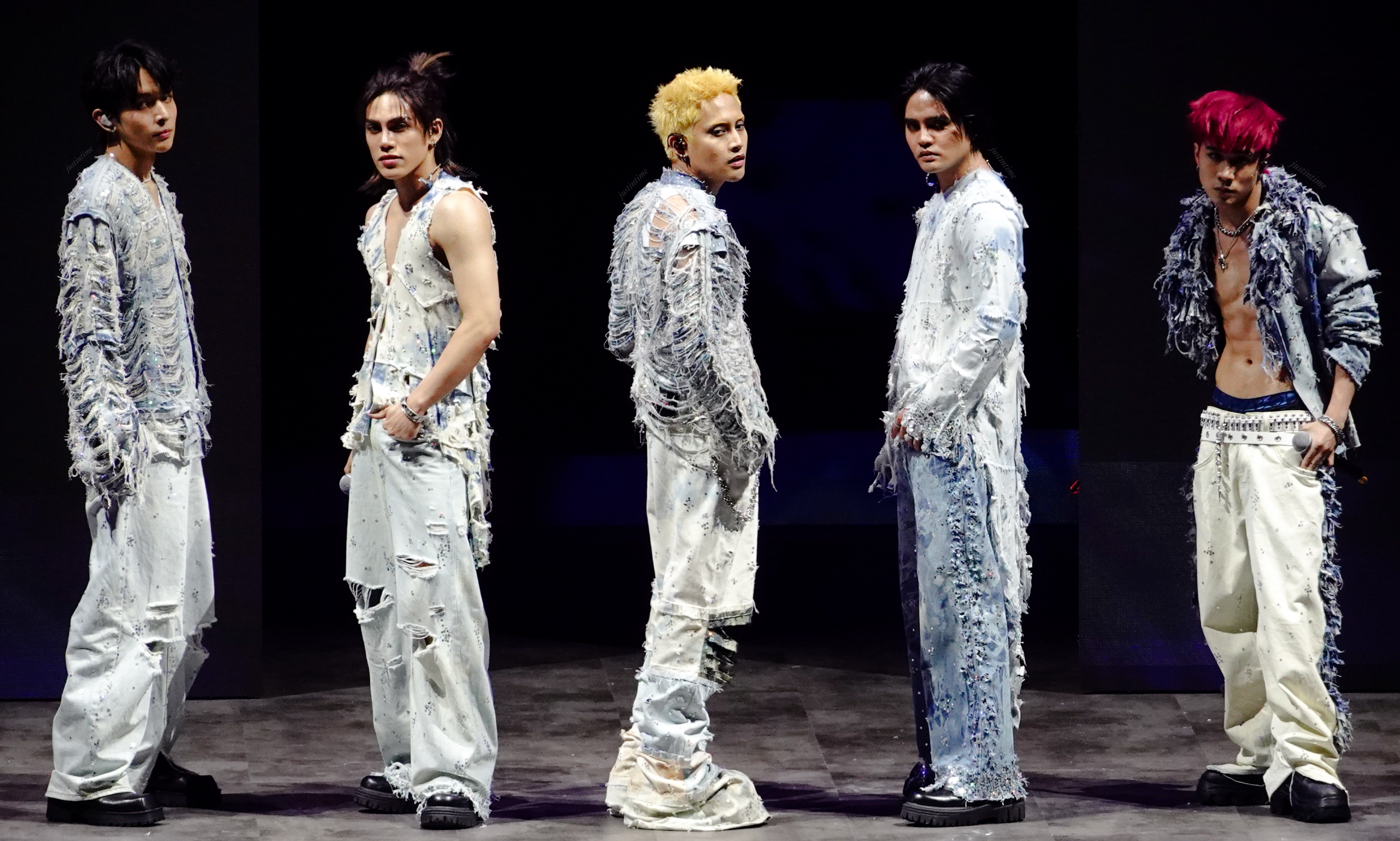
SB19 performing "Dam" at the Bench Body of Work fashion show in 2025

SB19 embarked on their third world tour, the Simula at Wakas World Tour (2025), to support the EP, with "Dam" serving as the tour's opening number and encore performance. They also included the song in their set list at the Puregold OPMCON 2025 concert. Aside from concerts, the band also promoted the song with live performances elsewhere. Shortly after the single's release, the group first performed the song on television during their appearance on the variety show All-Out Sundays on March 2, 2025. They later reprised their performance on the variety show It's Showtime on March 8. The band then appeared at the Body of Work fashion show curated by Bench on March 21, where they performed "Dam" midway through the event.

Following the release of Simula at Wakas, SB19 arranged a flash mob in Taguig on April 25, where "Dam" was among the songs they performed. They followed it with an appearance on the Wish 107.5 Bus on May 7, performing a three-song set list comprising "Dam". The band later made appearances at the 2025 editions of Hito Music Awards and the Filipino Music Awards, performing the song during both ceremonies. SB19 also made an appearance on the First Take and performed the song in one take. The band was among the headlining acts on the ACON 2025 festival, where they performed four songs, including "Dam". The group also performed the song when they headlined the New Year's Eve celebration in Bonifacio Global City in Taguig on December 31.

In promoting "Dam", an interactive installation art—named the Dam Tree—was installed in Bonifacio Global City on April 4. It was open for display until May 4. The installation art resembled the tree depicted in the song's music video. The tree's design featured woven detailing in the trunk with apples and lights hanging from its branches. The tree allowed visitors to listen to "Dam" and snippets of SB19's future music releases. The Dam Tree later reappeared at an interactive exhibit by SB19 in Gateway Mall in Cubao, Quezon City, which was open from May 24 to June 29.

== Track listing ==
Digital download and streaming

1. "Dam" – 3:29
2. "Dam" (extended version) – 3:54

Digital download and streaming (from the First Take)

1. "Dam" (from the First Take) – 3:24
2. "Dam" – 3:29

== Credits and personnel ==
Credits are adapted from Tidal.

- SB19 – vocals
- John Paulo Nase – songwriter, producer, recording
- Joshua Daniel Nase – songwriter, producer, recording
- Simon Servida – songwriter, producer, recording
- Heo Chan-goo – mixing, mastering
- Lee Oh-won – mixing assistance, mastering assistance
- Waxie Joaquin – mixing for Dolby Atmos, mastering for Dolby Atmos

== Charts ==
=== Weekly charts ===
Weekly peak chart positions for "Dam"
Chart (2025)	Peak position
Canada Digital Song Sales (Billboard)	14
Middle East and North Africa (IFPI)	12
New Zealand Hot Singles (RMNZ)	21
Philippines (IFPI)	5
Philippines (Philippines Hot 100)	4
Philippines (Top Philippine Songs)	3
Saudi Arabia (IFPI)	17
United Arab Emirates (IFPI)	7
UK Singles Downloads (OCC)	4
UK Singles Sales (OCC)	4
US World Digital Song Sales (Billboard)	1

=== Monthly charts ===
Monthly peak chart positions for "Dam"
Chart (2025)	Peak position
Philippines (Top P-pop Songs)	1

=== Year-end charts ===
2025 year-end chart positions for "Dam"
Chart (2025)	Position
Philippines (Philippines Hot 100)	62
Philippines (Top Philippine Songs)	24

== Release history ==
Release dates and formats for "Dam"
Region	Date	Format(s)	Version	Label	Ref.
Various	February 28, 2025	Digital download; streaming	Original	Sony Philippines	
Various	November 28, 2025	Digital download; streaming	From the First Take	Sony Philippines	
