= Simula at Wakas =

EP by SB19
- Released: April 25, 2025
- Length: 27:09
- Languages: English; Tagalog
- Label: Sony Philippines
- Producers: John Paulo Nase; Joshua Daniel Nase; Simon Servida; Xerxes Bakker; Alawn; Felip Jhon Suson; Luke April; August Rigo

SB19 chronology
Pagtatag! (2023)	Simula at Wakas (2025)	Simula at Wakas: Kickoff Concert Album (2026)

Singles from Simula at Wakas
- 1. "Dam" Released: February 28, 2025

Simula at Wakas (lit. 'Beginning and End') is the third extended play (EP) recorded by the Filipino boy band SB19. Sony Music Philippines released it on April 25, 2025. The band's leader, Pablo, produced the majority of the EP with Joshua Daniel Nase, Simon Servida, Xerxes Bakker, Alawn, Felip, Luke April, and August Rigo.

Simula at Wakas is the third and final installment of their trilogy of EPs that began with Pagsibol (2021) and followed by Pagtatag! (2023). "Dam" was released as the EP's lead single to commercial success, topping Billboard's World Digital Song Sales and charting in several countries. Upon release of Simula at Wakas, the EP entered the UK Album Downloads chart, peaking at number 4. Its songs all simultaneously charted on the Philippines Hot 100, with its lead single peaking at number four.

== Background and development ==
The Filipino boy band SB19 released their first EP, Pagsibol, in 2021, exploring genres such as pop rock, hip-hop, and EDM, departing from the dance-pop production from their debut studio album, Get in the Zone (2020). Pablo, the band's leader, revealed in an interview with Zach Sang that Pagsibol and their future releases are part of a trilogy, the others are titled Pagtatag! and Simula at Wakas. In 2023, the group released their second EP, Pagtatag!, the trilogy's second installment. The EP includes the single, "Gento" (2023), which scored their first entry to two record charts, including in the Philippines, where the single peaked at number eight. The following year, SB19 members focused on their solo careers, during which they all later confirmed during the premiere night for Pagtatag!: The Documentary (2024) that they are currently working with Simula at Wakas.

On January 31, 2025, SB19 published a trailer for their third EP, Simula at Wakas, via their social media accounts and announced in it that the EP would be released on April 25. The trailer also indicated that the EP would be preceded by single—which was untitled at the time—and that the group would embark on an international concert tour. The group released teaser photos in the days leading up to the single's release. They confirmed the title of the EP's lead single, "Dam", on February 17. On April 7, they announced the EP's track list and list of songwriters and producers involved in the record.

== Release and promotion ==
Sony Music Philippines released Simula at Wakas on April 25, 2025, through digital download and streaming formats. Its opening track, "Dam", was released ahead of the EP as its lead single on February 28, 2025, which was met with commercial success. The single entered multiple charts, topping Billboard's World Digital Song Sales—which made them the first Filipino artist to do so—and peaking at number four on the Philippines Hot 100. The single also entered charts in the Middle East and North Africa (MENA), Saudi Arabia, and the United Arab Emirates, charting within the top 20.

Three songs from the EP—"Dam", "Time", and "Dungka!"—were accompanied by music videos that were released on YouTube; the video for "Dam" was released on February 28, with videos for both "Time" and "Dungka!" released on April 25.

== Commercial performance ==
Simula at Wakas entered the UK Album Downloads and UK Albums Sales charts upon release, peaking at numbers 4 and 40, respectively, during the week of May 8, 2025. In the Philippines, all of the EP's tracks charted simultaneously on the Billboard Philippines Hot 100, dated May 10.

== Accolades ==
Awards and nominations for Simula at Wakas
Award	Year	Category	Result	Ref.
Awit Awards	2026	Album of the Year	Nominated	
Awit Awards	2026	Best Cover Art	Nominated	
Filipino Music Awards	2025	Album of the Year	Nominated	
P-pop Music Awards	2025	Album of the Year	Won	

== Track listing ==
Simula at Wakas standard track listing
No.	Title	Lyrics	Music	Producer(s)	Length
1.	"Dam"	John Paulo Nase	J.P. Nase; Joshua Daniel Nase; Simon Servida	J.P. Nase; J.D. Nase; Servida	3:29
2.	"Time"	Xerxes Bakker; Samuel Akinbode; J.P. Nase	Bakker; J.P. Nase	Bakker; J.P. Nase	3:44
3.	"8TonBall"	Benji Bae; Josh Cullen Santos	Alawn	Alawn	3:28
4.	"Quit"	Felip Jhon Suson; J.P. Nase	Suson	Suson; Luke April	4:43
5.	"Shooting for the Stars"	August Rigo	Rigo	Rigo	3:56
6.	"Dungka!"	J.P. Nase; J.D. Nase	J.P. Nase; J.D. Nase	J.P. Nase; J.D. Nase	3:35
7.	"Dam" (extended version)	J.P. Nase	J.P. Nase; J.D. Nase; Servida	J.P. Nase; J.D. Nase; Servida	3:54
Total length:					27:09

CD bonus track
No.	Title	Lyrics	Music	Producer(s)	Length
8.	"Gento" (Simula at Wakas World Tour version)	John Paulo Nase	J.P Nase	J.P. Nase; J.D. Nase; Servida

Note

- "Dam" and "Dungka!" are stylized in all uppercase.

== Credits and personnel ==
Credits are adapted from Tidal.

- SB19 – vocals
- John Paulo Nase – songwriting (tracks 1, 2, 4, 6, 7), production (1, 2, 6, 7), engineer
- Joshua Daniel Nase – songwriting (1, 6, 7), production (1, 6, 7), engineer
- Simon Servida – songwriting (1, 7), production (1, 7)
- Xerxes Bakker – songwriting (2), production (2)
- Samuel Akinbode – songwriting (2)
- Benji Bae – songwriting (3)
- Josh Cullen Santos – songwriting (3)
- Alawn – songwriting (3), production (3), mixing (3)
- Felip Jhon Suson – songwriting (4), production (4)
- Luke April – production (4), mixing (4)
- August Rigo – songwriting (5), production (5)
- Brian Lotho – engineer (4, 5)
- Heo Chan-goo – mixing (1, 2, 5–7), mastering
- Lee Oh-won – mixing assistance (1, 2, 5–7), mastering assistance
- Waxie Joaquin – Dolby Atmos mixing, Dobly Atmos mastering

== Charts ==
Chart performance for Simula at Wakas
Chart (2025)	Peak position
Japanese Albums (Oricon)	32
Japanese Top Albums Sales (Billboard Japan)	17
UK Albums Sales (OCC)	40

== Release history ==
Release history for Simula at Wakas
Region	Date	Format	Label
Various	April 25, 2025	Digital download; streaming	Sony Music Philippines
Japan	September 17, 2025	CD	Sony Music Japan
