= SB19 =

Filipino boy band

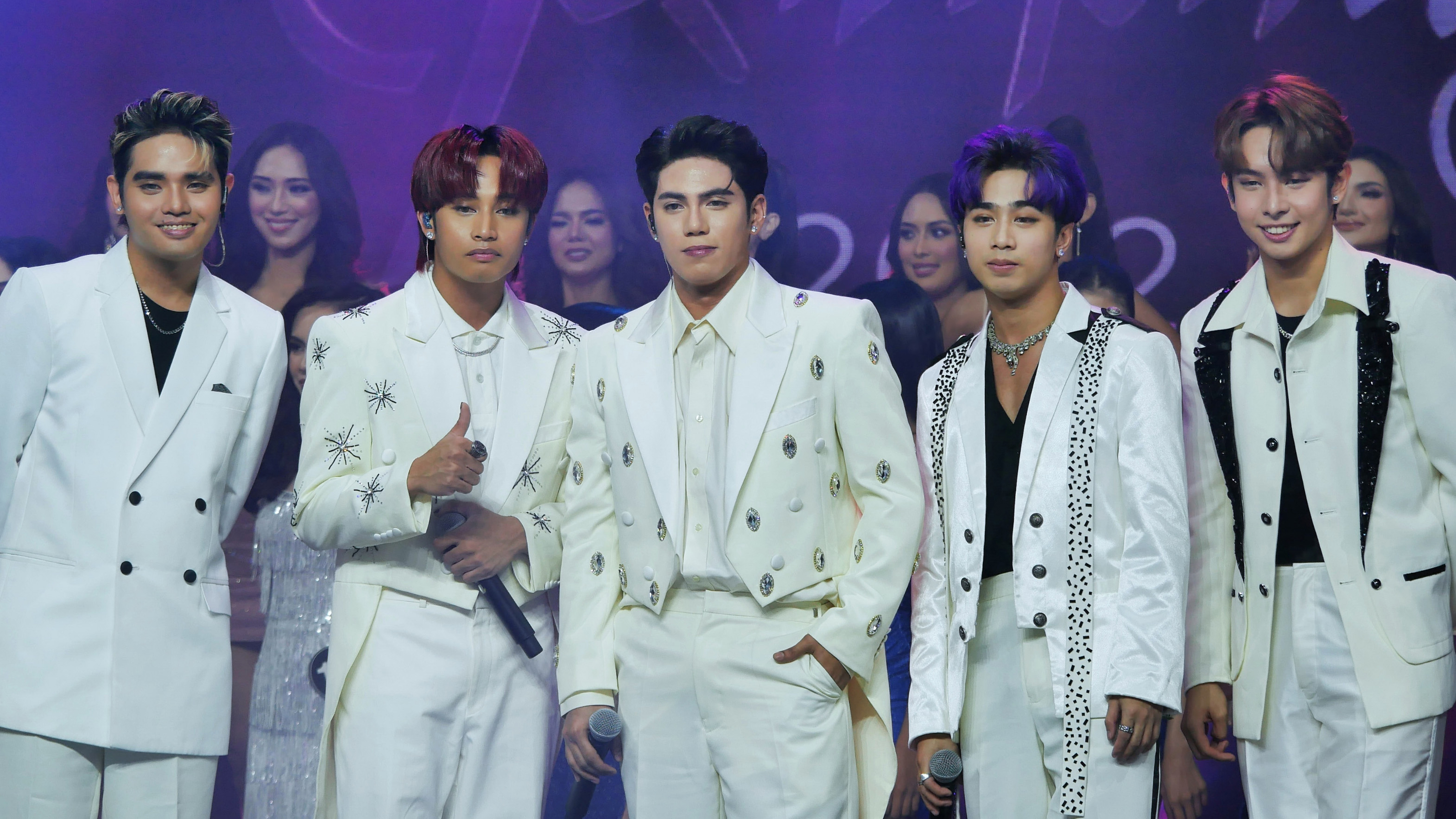
- SB19 at Binibining Pilipinas 2022 (foreground, left to right): Pablo, Ken, Stell, Josh, and Justin

Background information
- Also known as: Sound Break 19
- Origin: Makati, Metro Manila, Philippines
- Genres: P-pop; pop; dance-pop; hip-hop; EDM; R&B
- Works: Discography; songs; videography; live performances
- Years active: 2018–present
- Labels: ShowBT; Sony Philippines; 1Z
- Awards: Full list
- Members: Josh; Justin; Ken; Pablo; Stell
- Website: 1zentertainment.ph/sb19

SB19 (an acronym for Sound Break 19) is a Filipino boy band that debuted in 2018, consisting of Josh, Justin, Ken, Pablo, and Stell. The band's leader, Pablo, is often involved in co-writing and co-producing the group's own material. Their music has spanned various genres, including pop, dance-pop, hip-hop, EDM, and R&B, with lyrics centered on themes such as aspirations, resilience, and vulnerability. The group has received many accolades, including two Asia Artist Awards, a Nickelodeon Kids' Choice Award, twenty-one Awit Awards, nine Filipino Music Awards, seventeen PMPC Star Awards for Music, and twenty-three Wish 107.5 Music Awards. Having been named one of the leading acts in Filipino music, SB19 has been credited by the media with popularizing and paving the way for P-pop music and has been dubbed the "Kings of P-pop". Teen Vogue named SB19 one of the best boy bands of all time.

A local subsidiary of the South Korean entertainment company ShowBT, based in Makati, aimed to draw a new market in the Philippines similar to K-pop. They formed SB19 by selecting members from a talent search in 2016 for training. The soulful ballad "Tilaluha" was released as their debut single in 2018. It received a lukewarm reception, prompting them to consider disbanding. SB19 adopted dance-pop for their 2019 single "Go Up", which went viral on Twitter, leading to mainstream success and an increase in their social media following. That year, they signed a recording deal with Sony Music Philippines and headlined a sold-out concert at the Cuneta Astrodome. Subsequently, the band released their debut studio album, Get in the Zone, in 2020 and won their first Awit Award for Favorite Breakthrough Artist of the Year at the 2020 Awit Awards. SB19 began exploring hip-hop and EDM starting with their first extended play (EP), Pagsibol (2021), spawning singles "What?", "Mapa", and "Bazinga" that propelled them to widespread recognition.

SB19 left ShowBT and transitioned to self-management by founding 1Z Entertainment in 2023. That year, the group released their second EP, Pagtatag!. The lead single, "Gento", earned them their first entry on Billboard's Philippines Songs and World Digital Song Sales charts. Their third EP, Simula at Wakas (2025), has all of its tracks enter the Philippines Hot 100. Its lead single, "Dam", also topped the World Digital Song Sales—the first Filipino act to do so. SB19's second album, Wakas at Simula (2026), produced two Philippines Hot 100 charting singles, "Visa" and "Emoji". During that time, they have sold out many venues for their Pagtatag! World Tour (2023–2024) and Simula at Wakas World Tour (2025), including the Araneta Coliseum and the Philippine Arena, and became the first Southeast Asian to perform at Lollapalooza. The band also received nominations from the Grammy Awards, Billboard Music Awards, and the MTV Europe Music Awards. Outside of music, they have engaged in endorsements, philanthropic efforts, and ambassadorship of the National Commission for Culture and the Arts and the Department of Tourism. With over a billion Spotify streams, SB19 is one of the most-streamed Filipino artists.

== Name and logo ==
SB19's logo, in use since 2019

The name SB19 represents the involvement of the Philippines and South Korea in their formation. The letters "S" and "B" were taken from the initialism of the South Korean entertainment company ShowBT, which managed the band at the time. The number "19" was derived from the difference between the country calling codes of South Korea (+82) and the Philippines (+63). (Note: Derived from $82 - 63 = 19$) The group added that "SB" is also an acronym of "sound break", which they stated signifies the group's goal of "breaking into the Philippine and international music scene". SB19's logo was unveiled in 2019, described as a "fusion of a diamond and windmill", which they associate with the support they received from their fans over time, likening them to a diamond and a windmill: "[A] diamond shines even in the tiniest of light—our fans are our light. Even if we only receive a little support, we will keep shining. [...] A windmill operates when there is wind. For us, the wind is our fans."

== History ==
=== 2016–2018: Formation and early years ===
The Korean Wave became a prominent cultural phenomenon in the Philippines, contributing to K-pop's growing popularity in the country. It received substantial fanfare, though locally based pop groups remained unpopular. The South Korean comedian Jung Sung-han, a former member of the comedy trio Cult Triple, then established the talent agency ShowBT Philippines Corporation—a subsidiary of the South Korean entertainment company ShowBT—headquartered in Makati, Philippines. Its formation was part of his goals of localizing K-pop and Korean culture in other Asian markets. He identifies the Philippines as an appropriate country for establishing a "cultural hybrid", citing Filipinos' fluency in English, a sizeable K-pop fandom, and a far more open local entertainment market as strengths.

ShowBT began searching for local talent in 2016 to undergo training similar to the Korean idol trainee system before debuting as a boy band. From 300 applicants, the talent agency selected seven initial members through a series of evaluations. The band members described the training process as "motivating at first but [...] very exhausting", in which they underwent regular exercises, vocal practices, dancing, ballet training, and personality development. The agency forbade the members from engaging in vices and romantic relationships. Disillusioned by the lack of success, most members considered disbanding. Stell stayed while six of the original seven-member group pulled out, yet three members—Josh, Justin, and Pablo (formerly Sejun until 2020)—reconsidered returning to the group. Ken was added to the group's lineup after being invited by Josh to audition. All of them would later become members of SB19. Before their formation, Stell and Josh were members of the dance group Se-eon, which represented the Philippines at a dance competition in Incheon, through which they met Pablo. Justin was initially enrolled in a dance workshop at ShowBT and later recruited to form the band, while Ken was a hip-hop dancer based in Mindanao.

Initially, SB19 would perform at company events organized by ShowBT. After about two years of training, the band released their first single, the soulful ballad "Tilaluha". Their talent agency released it independently on October 26, 2018, as their debut single. The single received a weak reception and little success. In a retrospective review by Nylon Manila's Rafael Bautista, he believed the song is an "underrated [...] song that deserves praise" and found the release high-risk, considering it is "the first song people will get to hear from [SB19]", but he opined that they succeeded in showing their vocals. The group would promote themselves by visiting and performing at local shopping malls and schools. They eventually hosted their first fan meeting, SB19: Start of the Best, in December 2018 across two shows in San Juan and Davao. However, their disappointment at the lack of initial success with their debut single later led the group to the brink of disbandment anew. In a retrospective interview with MTV, Pablo recalled the group not gaining much despite their constant investment and effort: "We have performed in different places, [...] but we weren't really gaining [anything] or earning money. It was really hard to pursue our dreams. You have to provide for your family, you have to provide for yourself."

=== 2019–2020: Breakthrough and first album ===
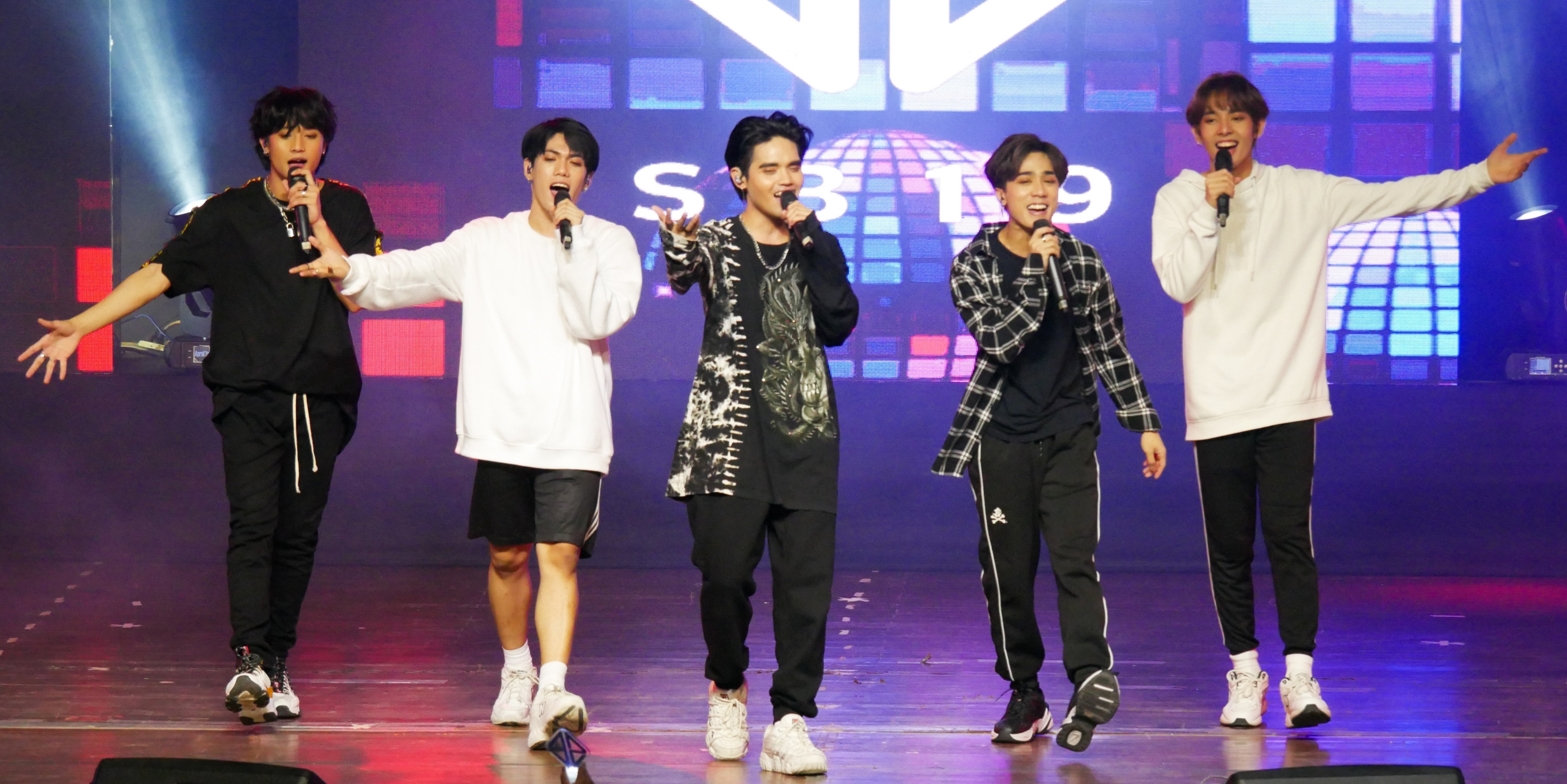
SB19 performing at a Get in the Zone show in Negros in 2019

From a pool of songs that the group had already recorded, SB19 has chosen "Go Up" as their next single. Pablo revealed that the band had agreed they would part ways if their efforts proved unsuccessful: "We told each other that if this song didn't work out, we would be splitting up". In the process, they choreographed a dance for the song and practiced it multiple times as preparation. ShowBT Philippines released the single on July 19, 2019, and a video of the group dancing to the song's choreography was released on YouTube. Retrospectively, Billboard Philippines commented that the song is a "great introduction to [SB19's] discography" and "has stayed timeless". SB19 received accolades for "Go Up"; it won Song of the Year at the 2020 Myx Music Awards and Wishclusive Pop Performance of the Year at the 2020 Wish 107.5 Music Awards.

Months after the release of a video of SB19 dancing to "Go Up", it went viral, emerging as a trending topic on social media platforms. Subsequently, the band has attracted mainstream media attention, achieving a breakthrough. They began appearing on several local television shows, including on the variety show ASAP Natin 'To, and have received widespread support from social media users, prompting increased social media engagement and following. The group then performed at a Philippine Korea Cultural Exchange Festival in September, debuted on Billboard's Next Big Sound chart in November, and embarked on their first free concert tour, Get in the Zone: Nationwide Concert, to various cities in the Philippines from December 2019 through January 2020. The tour's first show at Cuneta Astrodome in Pasay reportedly sold out 3,500 free tickets in three minutes.

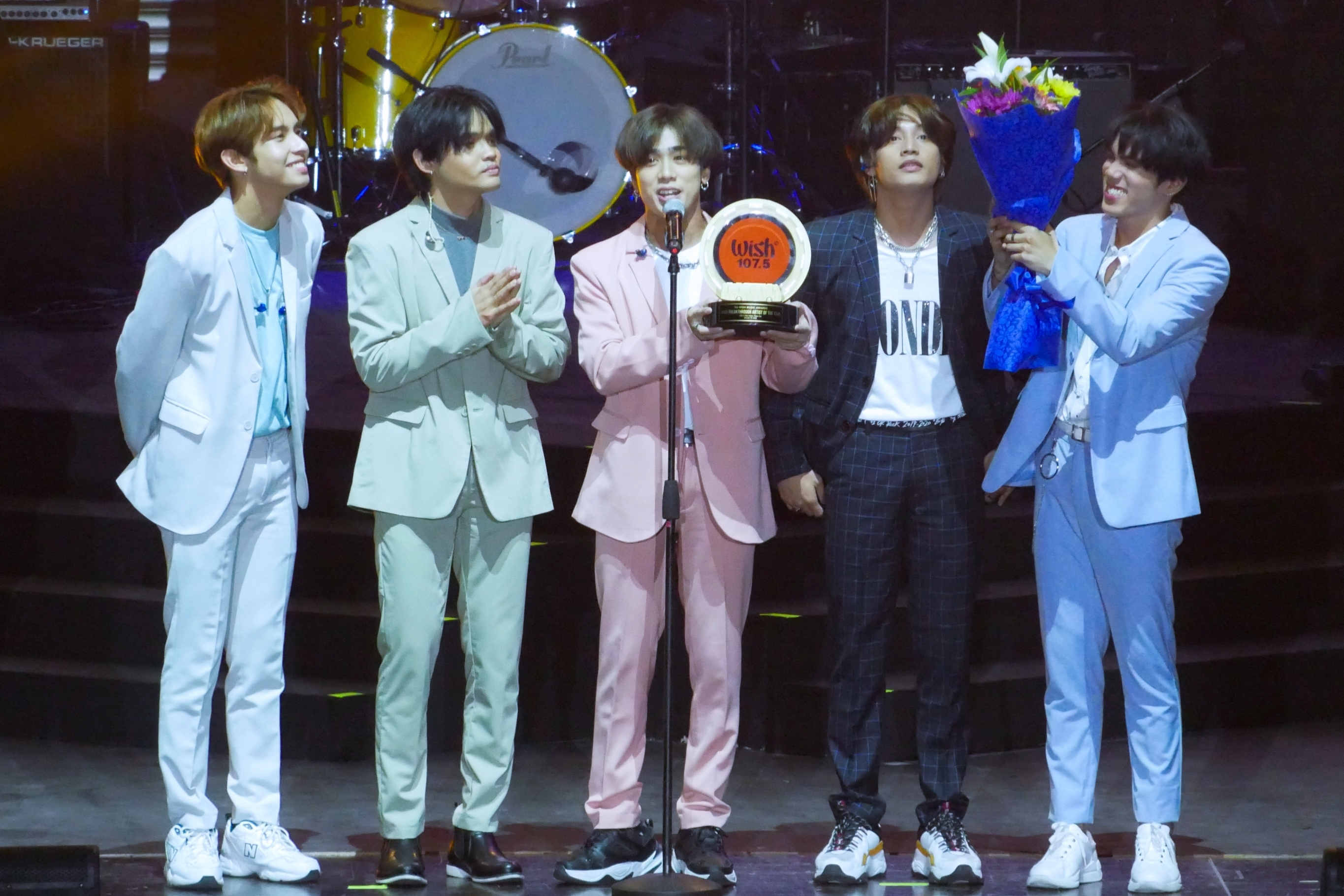
SB19 at the 2020 Wish 107.5 Music Awards, where they were named Wish Breakthrough Artist of the Year

In December 2019, Sony Music Philippines announced that SB19 had signed a recording deal with them, and released the band's next single, "Alab (Burning)", under the label. The single received the Myx Music Award for Song of the Year. The group also appeared on Billboard's Social 50 chart, a first for a Filipino artist, where they peaked at number six. In 2020, due to the COVID-19 pandemic, SB19's scheduled events, including a planned concert at the Araneta Coliseum, were postponed. Instead, they curated "Ikako", a homage to healthcare workers, and released it as a promotional single exclusively on YouTube on May 15. Subsequently, SB19 released their debut studio album, Get in the Zone, in July, featuring nine tracks total. A while later, the group staged their first livestream concert, SB19: Live from Manila, in November through the streaming platform Global Live. In December, they starred in a short film, Ex-Mas, released through YouTube, with a plot centered on a holiday gathering. During the New Year's Eve to 2021, the band co-headlined a virtual concert titled Bye2020. SB19 was named the Breakthrough Artist of the Year at the 2020 ceremonies of the Wish 107.5 Music Awards and the Awit Awards.

=== 2021–2022: Pagsibol and rise to prominence ===
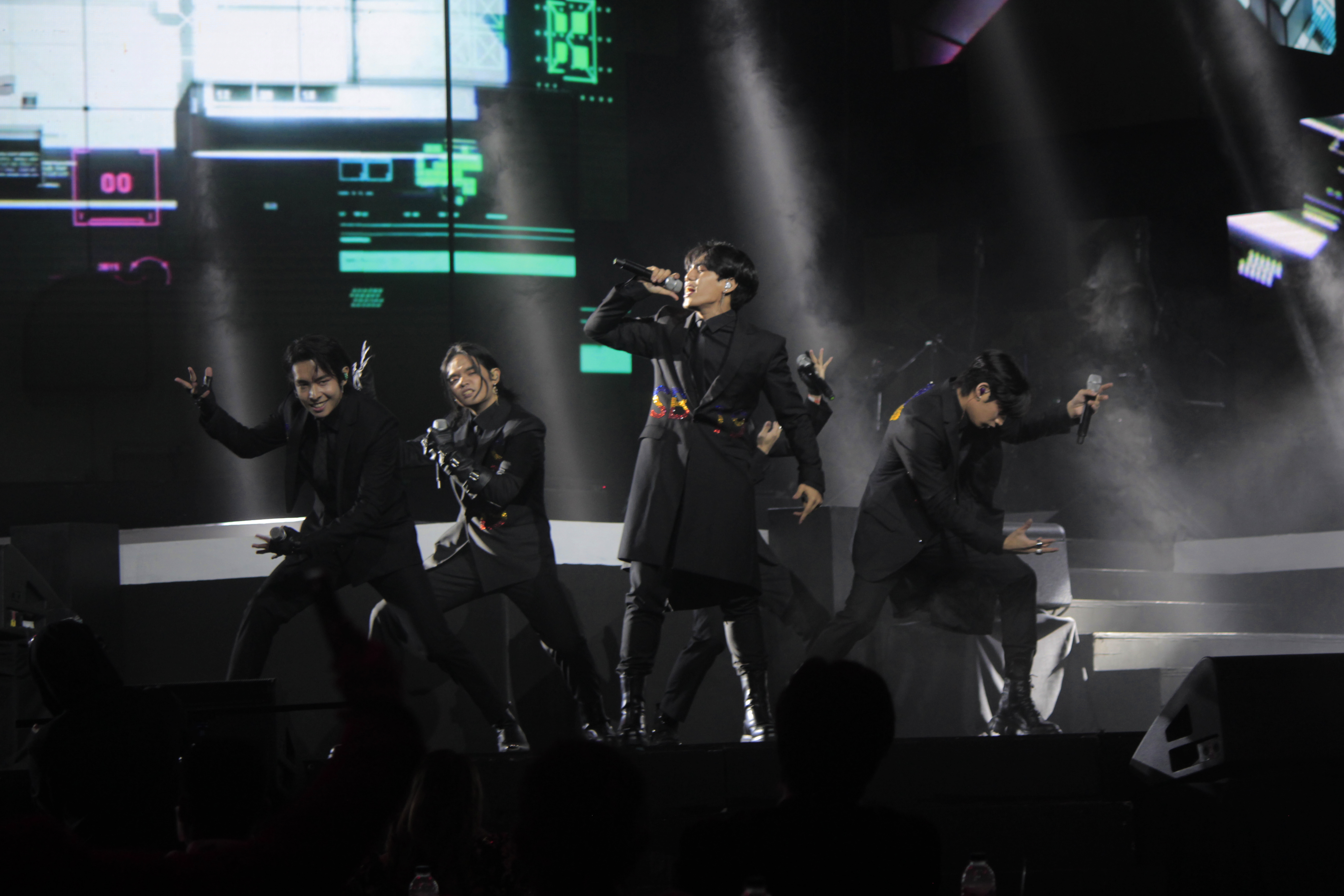
SB19 performing at the 2021 Wish 107.5 Music Awards, where they won the most awards of the night

In January 2021, SB19 performed at the 2021 Wish 107.5 Music Awards, where they tied with the Juans in bagging the most awards of the night, including the Wish Group of the Year. The following month, the band released a trailer on YouTube, titled "Ikalawang Yugto" (lit. 'second chapter'); the trailer came after a social media post that teased their new music. The group released the single "What?" in March as the lead single from their apparent next album, which recalibrated their sound from dance-pop to genres like hip-hop and EDM. Its accompanying music video accumulated over one million views in its first 24 hours of release on YouTube. SB19 followed it with another single, "Mapa", released in May. The single went on to become among the most-searched songs globally on Google Search that year. "What?" and "Mapa" received accolades from the Awit Awards, with Billboard Philippines ranking both singles as among the best songs from the band's discography. The group then released a "Band Version" remix of "Mapa" with Ben&Ben in June.

On July 22, 2021, SB19 released their first extended play (EP), Pagsibol. It featured six tracks, including "Bazinga", which became one of the most talked-about songs on Twitter. The following month, the band headlined an online concert, Back in the Zone, during which they debuted songs from Pagsibol. The concert saw commercial success, drawing 14,000 unique simultaneous viewers, making it one of the most successful online concerts in the Philippines. In October, the band co-headlined with 4th Impact for another online concert, Forte, which featured orchestra productions of their songs. Aside from concerts, SB19 performed at another edition of the Philippine Korea Cultural Exchange Festival in September, and at award shows, including the 2021 editions of the Awit Awards and Myx Music Awards, where they received the Myx Music Award for Artist of the Year. The group commemorated their third anniversary with the Our Zone online concert in November. During the concert, the band debuted several unreleased songs, including the Christmas single "Ligaya", released later in December. SB19 received nominations for the MTV Europe Music Award for Best Southeast Asian Act and the Billboard Music Award for Top Social Artist in 2021, the latter of which made them the first Southeast Asian act to be nominated for the award.

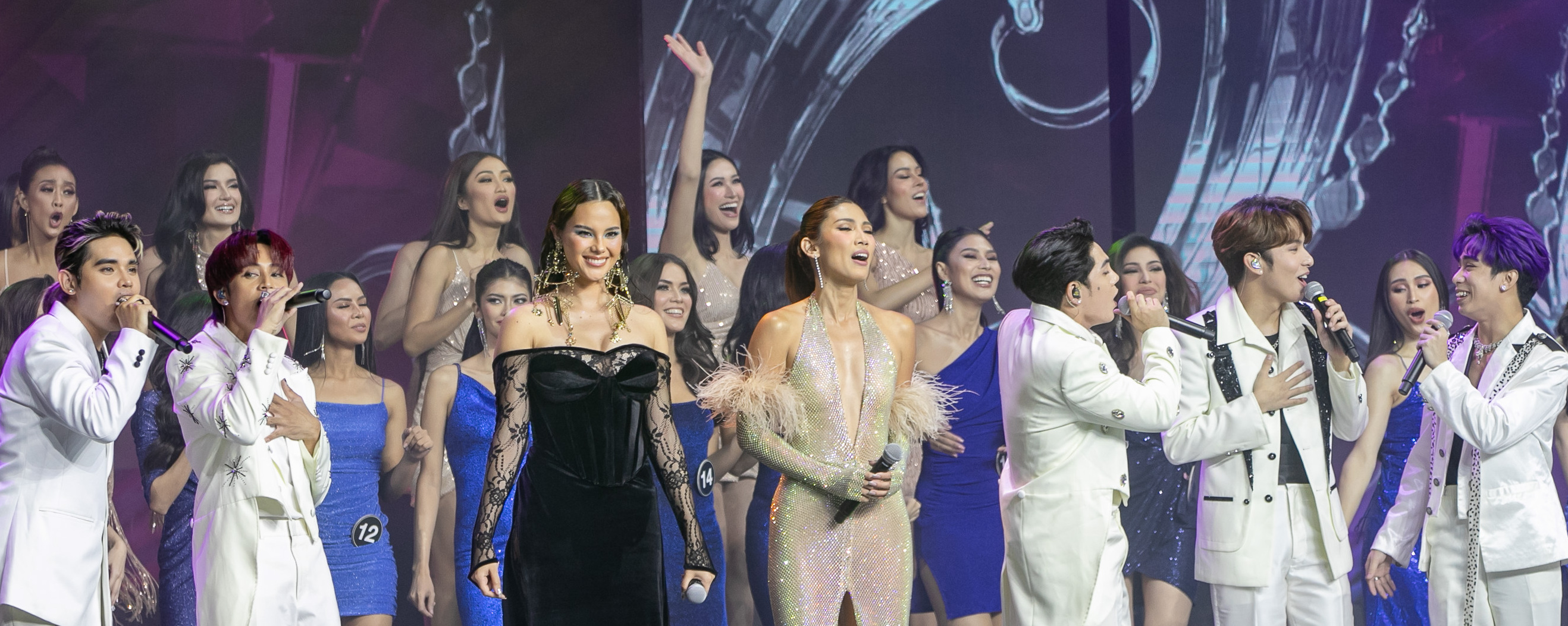
SB19 performing "Win Your Heart" at the opening number to Binibining Pilipinas 2022

In January 2022, SB19 represented the Philippines at the Round Festival, which promotes acculturation across ASEAN, and returned to the Wish 107.5 Music Awards, performing at its 7th annual ceremony. In March, the band co-headlined a concert at Expo 2020 in Dubai. Shortly after, they were featured at the inaugural PPOPCON's lineup and headlined their first solo concert, Dunkin' Presents SB19, at the Araneta Coliseum in April. SB19 then briefly appeared on the tenth season of Pinoy Big Brother that month as houseguests, and later as guest performers on Anne Curtis's concert in June. The group recorded their version of the theme song to Binibining Pilipinas, "Win Your Heart", which they performed at the pageant's 58th edition in July. The band's next single, "WYAT (Where You At)", was released on September 2. The group embarked on their first world tour that month through December, to cities across Asia and North America, including two sold-out shows at the Araneta Coliseum. While touring, they made their debut on American television on Good Day New York. They also billed the lineup of the Manila edition of the Head in the Clouds Festival in December and the New Year's Eve countdown to 2023 at SM Mall of Asia.

=== 2023–2024: Pagtatag! and transition to self-management ===
In February 2023, SB19 performed during an event in observance for the National Arts Month in the Philippines. In April of that year, the group released a trailer on YouTube featuring them with the Filipino actor Pepe Herrera, announcing the band's second EP. Titled Pagtatag!, the EP was released on June 9, 2023. The EP was preceded by the lead single "Gento", released on May 19. With "Gento", SB19 secured their first entry on Billboard's Philippines Songs and World Digital Song Sales charts, making them the first Filipino group to enter the latter. The single later became a TikTok trend and a commercial success for the band. Critics from CNN Philippines considered the single one of the best Filipino songs of 2023. The EP received accolades, including the PMPC Star Award for Music for Album of the Year, while "Gento" won two Awit Awards out of seven nominations. The single was also submitted as an entry for Best Pop Duo/Group Performance at the 66th Annual Grammy Awards, but did not secure a nomination.

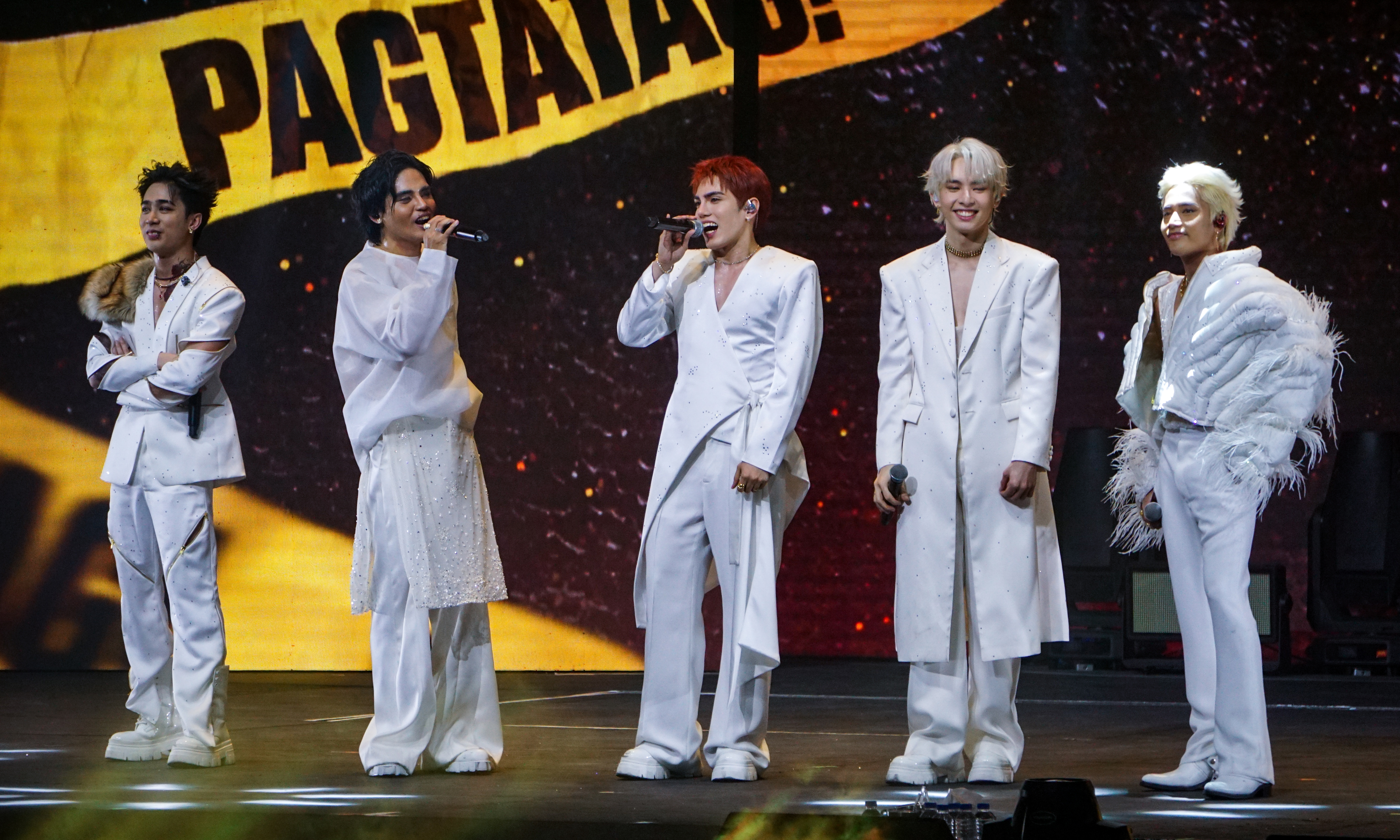
SB19 at a Pagtatag! World Tour show at the Araneta Coliseum

In June 2023, SB19 embarked on the Pagtatag! World Tour to support Pagtatag!, comprising eighteen shows across five countries through May 2024. The tour sold out four non-consecutive shows at the Araneta Coliseum in Quezon City. While touring, the band co-headlined the 2023 edition of the PPOPCON in July and a Watsons Playlist concert in September. They also served as co-headliners of the 2023 editions of music festivals, including the Round Festival and Playlist Live Festival in October in Indonesia, and the Fusion: The Philippine Music Festival in November. SB19 was invited as guest performers at concerts by Jvke and KZ Tandingan in September. In celebrating the group's fifth anniversary, they hosted a sold-out fan meeting titled One Zone in October at the Araneta Coliseum. The band later performed at the 2023 Asia Artist Awards ceremony in December, where they were awarded the Best Artist Award – Singer, and performed at a New Year's Eve countdown to 2024 at Ayala Avenue in Makati.

SB19 departed from ShowBT in 2023 and began transitioning to self-management by establishing 1Z Entertainment. The band initially announced the change in management at a press conference in June, following the release of Pagtatag!, which they said allowed them to pursue more creative freedom in their work. The group formally announced the company's establishment in October. In November of that year, a legal dispute between 1Z and ShowBT surfaced regarding the use of the band's trademarks, with ShowBT found to have the legal rights to it until 2031. The dispute resulted in the band being unable to use their name on social media and live performances, with some linking the dispute to cancellations of the Asian stops of the Pagtatag! World Tour. Amidst the dispute, their fans temporarily adopted the name Mahalima, a portmanteau of the Tagalog words mahal (lit. 'love') and lima (lit. 'five'), as an alias for the group. The following month, 1Z Entertainment announced that they had settled an "amicable agreement" with ShowBT, allowing SB19 to retain their brand for future use.

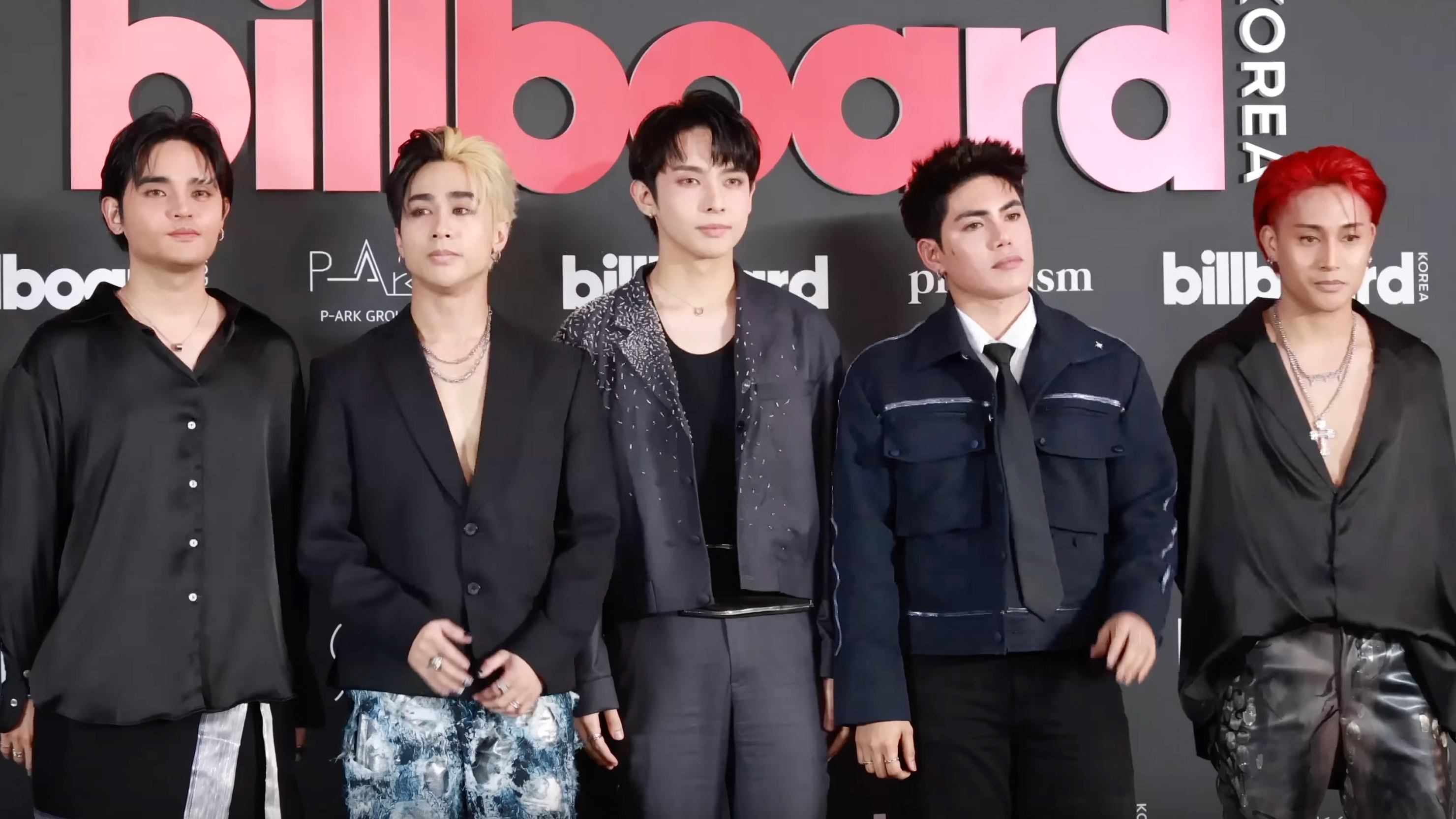
SB19 at Billboard K Power 100 in 2024, where they were awarded the Voices of Asia

In January 2024, SB19 performed a halftime show at the Asia-Pacific Predator League hosted at the SM Mall of Asia Arena. During the months that followed, the group performed at several festivals, including the Abrenian Kawayan Festival in Abra in March, the Aurora Music Festival 2024 in Pampanga in April, and the Naliyagan Festival in Agusan del Sur in June. They then served as entertainment at Binibining Pilipinas 2024 in July and co-headlined several branded concerts throughout 2024, including the Puregold concert in July, the Acer Day and the Watsons Playlist concert in August, and the Billboard Philippines Mainstage event in October. The band was awarded the Nickelodeon Kids' Choice Award for Favorite Asian Act, making them the first Filipino group to do so, and the Voices of Asia award presented at the Billboard K Power 100 in Seoul.

SB19 collaborated with several artists for their singles that year: Ian Asher and Terry Zhong for "Moonlight" and apl.de.ap for "Ready" released in May, and Gloc-9 for "Kalakal" released in August, with "Moonlight" and "Kalakal" earning them multiple accolades from the Awit Awards, including the Best Rap/Hip-hop Recording for the latter. SB19 starred in the documentary film Pagtatag! The Documentary, directed by Jed Regala, that documented the Pagtatag! World Tour, which was screened in theaters in August. The film grossed ₱21 million, making it the highest-grossing documentary film in the Philippines. Their sixth anniversary concert, Thanksgiving, was held at the SM Mall of Asia Arena in October, and later appeared as a guest on Gary Valenciano's concert in December. The band also headlined the New Year's Eve countdown to 2025 at SM Mall of Asia.

=== 2025–present: Simula at Wakas, Wakas at Simula, and Lollapalooza debut ===
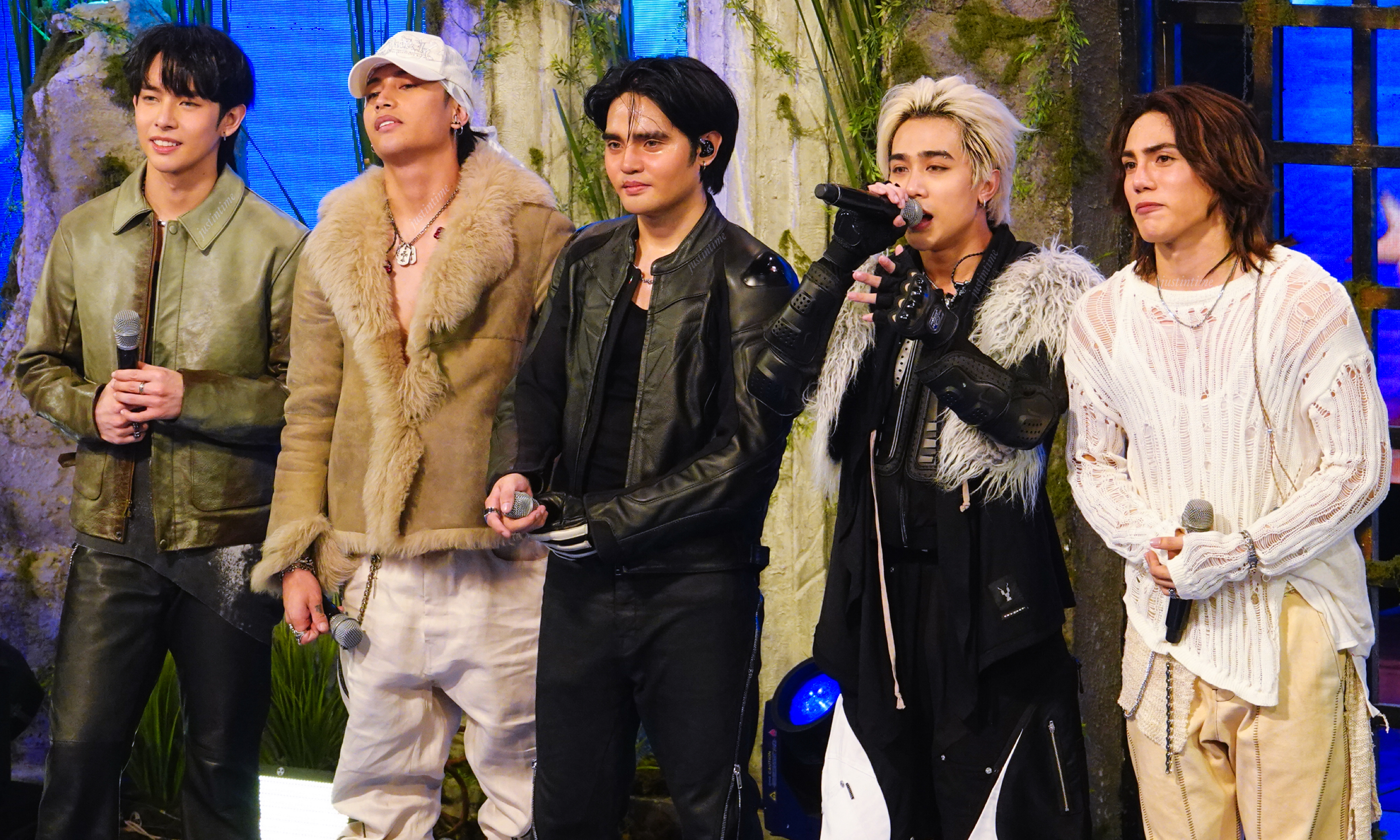
SB19 promoting "Dam" during their appearance on It's Showtime in 2025

In January 2025, SB19 began teasing their third EP, Simula at Wakas, with a trailer they released via their social media accounts. Simula at Wakas was released on April 25, and was preceded by the lead single "Dam" released on February 28. A commercial success, the EP became the band's first entry to album sales charts in Japan and the UK, while all its tracks entered the Philippines Hot 100, with "Dam" peaking in the top five. The single also topped the World Digital Song Sales, making SB19 the first Filipino artist to do so. Billboard Philippines named Simula at Wakas one of the best albums of 2025, while its track "Dungka!" was also considered one of the best songs that year, later earning the Filipino Music Award for Pop Song of the Year. To support the EP, the band embarked on the Simula at Wakas World Tour from May through December, with two sold-out shows held at the Philippine Arena, making them the first Filipino artist to hold two consecutive shows at the arena.

Amidst the Simula at Wakas World Tour, SB19 collaborated with Sarah Geronimo for the single "Umaaligid" released in July, peaking in the top 50 of the Philippines Hot 100. The band co-headlined the 2025 concerts Puregold OPMCON in July and Acer Day in August. They also billed the lineup of the 2025 music festivals Bicol Loco in Legazpi in June, the Cebu edition of the Aurora Music Festival in November, and the ACON in Taiwan in December. They served as entertainment for the Binibining Pilipinas 2025 for the third time and performed a halftime show at the Honor of Kings International Championship. On the group's seventh anniversary, SB19 headlined a fashion-themed concert, Fast Zone, featuring pieces curated by fashion designer Francis Libiran. The band also performed at the Hito Music Awards 2025 in Taiwan and at the Filipino Music Awards 2025, where they were recognized as Artist of the Year. After the tour concluded, the group performed at a New Year's Eve show in Bonifacio Global City.

SB19 released the live album Simula at Wakas: Kickoff Concert Album in January 2026, featuring recordings from their Philippine Arena concert performances. Not long after, the group released their second studio album Wakas at Simula in March, which includes songs from Pagtatag! and Simula at Wakas and re-recordings of tracks from Pagsibol, along with new material. Two of its singles, "Visa" and "Emoji"—the latter featured Taiwanese singer Jolin Tsai—peaked in the top 70 of the Philippines Hot 100. SB19 then headlined the Wakas at Simula: The Trilogy Concert Finale at the SMDC Festival Grounds in Parañaque in April, which had an estimated attendance of 60,000–100,000. The band later billed another edition of the Aurora Music Festival in May, and months later, made their debut appearance at the Lollapalooza in Chicago in July, which made them the first Filipino and Southeast Asian group to perform at the festival. The group performed at the Summer Sonic Festival in Japan in August. SB19 signed a partnership deal with entertainment companies Lunari Global and United Talent Agency in June for international representation. The band's next single, "Lawless", was released on July 31. Following their Lollapalooza debut, they are set to perform at the 2027 edition of Coachella.

== Artistry ==
=== Influences ===
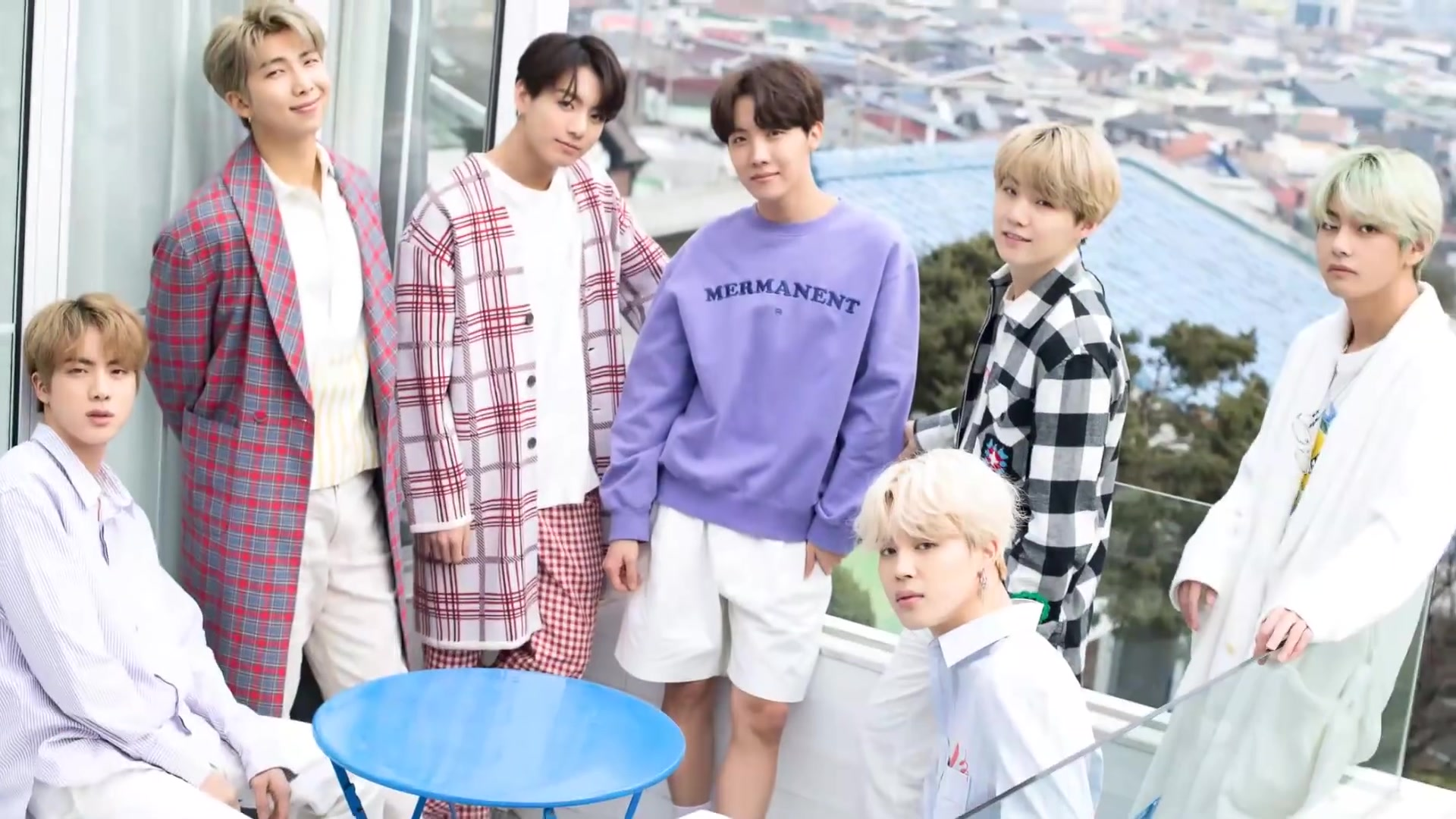
SB19 have cited several K-pop artists as inspirations, including BTS (pictured).

SB19 have revealed that they were K-pop music enthusiasts before their debut and have admired several K-pop groups. They have cited several artists, including BTS, BigBang, Girls' Generation, Highlight, VIXX, and Got7, as their idols. Josh and Stell have danced to K-pop songs, including when they covered BTS's "Danger" (2014) together for a dance competition. Josh recalls that K-pop has become his inspiration and refuge when he feels at his lowest, citing BigBang and Girls' Generation's music as part of his coping mechanism. Stell is also fascinated by K-pop, adding that listening to K-pop brings a unique energy and helps him let go of his problems, naming Highlight, VIXX, and BTS as his favorites. Justin also shared that he is an avid fan of Got7, further influenced by his college friends at the time.

SB19's artistry also stems from the influence of K-pop groups, which shaped their work ethic, performance style, artistic direction, and ambitions for globalization. The band have admired South Korean artists' discipline, which inspired them to follow suit. They have also commented on K-pop artists' tendency to distribute roles across members, which they have found creative. SB19 have cited BTS's commercial success as an inspiration to strive for long-term success and global expansion, and they consider it proof that such success is achievable as long as they continue to improve throughout their career. While they cite K-pop as major influences, the band has emphasized that they do not intend to imitate K-pop groups and instead utilize the acquired industry skills to promote their own language, music, and culture rooted in Filipino identity.

=== Musical style and themes ===
Early in their career, SB19 adopted dance-pop stylings manifested in their first studio album, Get in the Zone (2020). However, the group's musical reinvention beginning in 2021 has led them to expand their discography across multiple genres, including pop, hip-hop, EDM, R&B, reggaeton, disco, rock, and dream-pop, (Note: Attributed to multiple references:) with the band recognized for their musical versatility and their inclination to explore and blend different musical genres. When asked about their musical identity, Josh has shared the group's intention to disregard music trends and instead prefer to create music that is "uniquely theirs" by "experimenting". Since their debut, the band's leader, Pablo, has been mainly involved in writing and producing for their own material, with other members also contributing later in their career.

Since their inception, SB19 has emphasized that their musical direction is rooted in showcasing Filipino music and culture, and they have been noted for releasing music written in local languages Tagalog and Cebuano, in addition to English. Some writers have described SB19's music as an expression of Filipino identity. Ken has discussed the importance of incorporating local languages into their material, noting music's ability to transcend linguistic barriers; aside from Tagalog, they have incorporated Cebuano into songs such as "Crimzone" (2023) and "Kalakal" (2024). Pablo considered music a way to highlight Filipino cultural heritage, citing how the Philippines' archipelagic nature had allowed the emergence of diverse cultures and languages that he thinks should be showcased in various art forms; in their song "Mana" (2021), they referred to a Filipino folklore creature, the manananggal.

SB19 has said that they prioritize authenticity by writing music that reflects their own experiences rather than conforming to strict expectations. Their songs are frequently inspired by the members' lived experiences, personalities, and artistic journey, resulting in lyrics that explore themes such as personal growth, resilience, perseverance, family, aspirations, and emotional vulnerability. SB19 has repeatedly explored goals, personal growth, and resilience in their songs, including "Gento" (2023) and "Dam" (2025), both of which convey that success is earned through hard work. Their lyrics also often share relatable experiences and emotions, which the media have described as resonating with listeners, regardless of age. Their 2021 single, "Mapa", included a message expressing parental gratitude, which has been considered an "anthem for parents", leading to the song being associated with audiences' life milestones. Pablo has spoken about the pleasure in writing songs that resonate with people: "The best feeling ever is when you write a song that is very personal to you, heartfelt, and then people sing it along with you. You sang together; it's like you're beating as one."

SB19 has also utilized music to address the criticisms they faced, discussing them in their songs "Bazinga" (2021) and "Dungka!" (2025). They have also dwelled on discussing mental health, with songs like "Nyebe" (2021) and "Ilaw" (2023) discussing personal worries and struggles. Rome Saenz of Billboard Philippines has described SB19's songs as introspective, observing their emphasis on storytelling, with each track presenting a distinct narrative or perspective. Aside from the lyrical resonance, Saenz has interpreted the band's music as documentation of the group's artistic evolution and personal journey through different stages of their career. SB19's material is also known for their use of layered lyricism and wordplaying, often employing words with dual meaning or forming portmanteaus for song titles: "Tilaluha" (2018), a combination of tila (lit. 'stop raining') and luha (lit. 'tears'), and "Ikako" (2020), a blend of the words ikaw (lit. 'you') and ako (lit. 'me').

== Public image ==
SB19 is considered the most celebrated P-pop group of their generation. While the media once highlighted skepticism and scrutiny toward them early in their career, the band has since been described as artists who have helped expand expectations for Filipino artists through their training model, performance style, and artistic ambitions. The media has commented regarding their performance capabilities, evolving artistic identity, self-management, fashion choices, and dedicated fanbase.

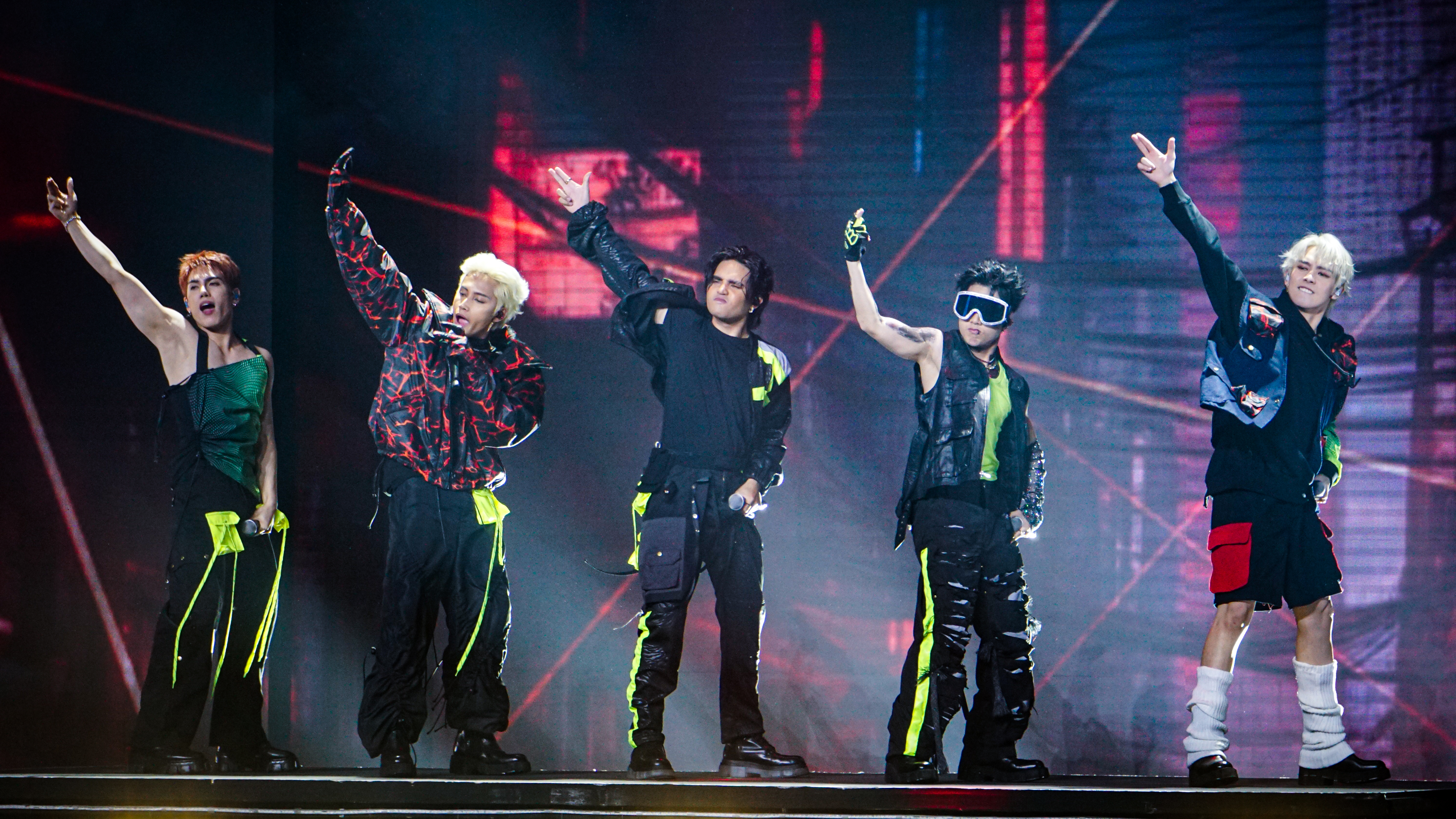
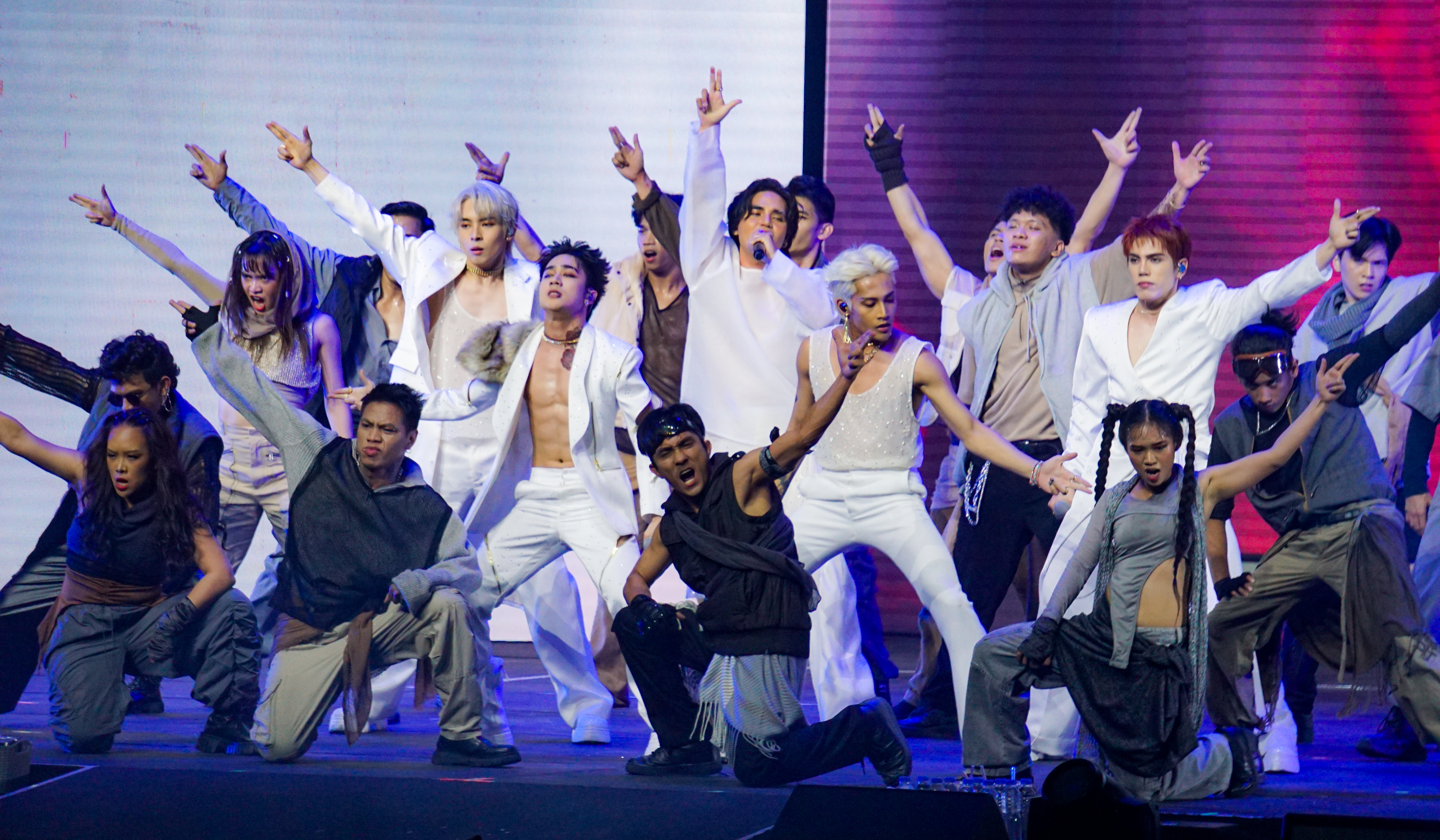
SB19 is widely regarded as high-caliber performers and is also known for their high-fashion clothing.

SB19 was initially perceived as "too polished and manufactured" and further labelled as "K-pop copycats". Inquirer's Allan Policarpio has suggested that their initial stylized visuals undermined their artistic credibility, leading the media and critics to fail to provide proper coverage or appraisal of SB19 and their work at the time. Perceptions shifted in 2019 after their video dancing to "Go Up" went viral on social media, with users praising their synchronized group dancing. The media has since continued to highlight the group's dancing, vocal abilities, stamina, and stage presence at their concerts.

SB19 has been described as self-made and self-managed artists, rising from the band's desire for full artistic control. Media coverage of the group has emphasized the members' involvement in producing their own work. Following their transition to self-management in 2023, the media began portraying them as entrepreneurs and artists of their own company. Billboard's Jeff Benjamin has commented that the decision served as proof of their inclination toward assured creative freedom. Pie Gonzaga of Rolling Stone Philippines believed it reflected a shift in the local music industry, with more artists opting out of established entertainment companies to pursue music careers.

SB19 has embraced expressive fashion as part of their visual identity, with lifestyle journalists highlighting the band's integration of high-fashion styling of streetwear. Their fashion has been noted for disregarding gender norms, highlighting their use of makeup and jewelry. The group has incorporated Filipino elements into their clothing to showcase Filipino heritage. The media has covered SB19's collaborations with multiple established Filipino stylists and fashion designers for clothing featured in their work and live performances. Fashion articles have also highlighted a shift in the group's clothing aesthetics, which are now geared toward a mature, high-concept, and fashion-forward image, evolving from the anime-inspired pastel-heavy outfits they wore early in their career.

The media has often emphasized SB19's narrative on perseverance and humility, with coverage recounting the group's years of training and struggles before their breakthrough. Further media coverage has frequently highlighted SB19's rigorous training background and sustained commitment to improving their performances and artistry, emphasizing the group's disciplined and goal-oriented approach to their career. SB19's growing visibility was also supported by their fandom, A'Tin, which media outlets have portrayed as a dedicated online community. Their fanbase contributed to the band's breakthrough and the sustained online presence and engagement that followed throughout their career.

== Legacy and influence ==
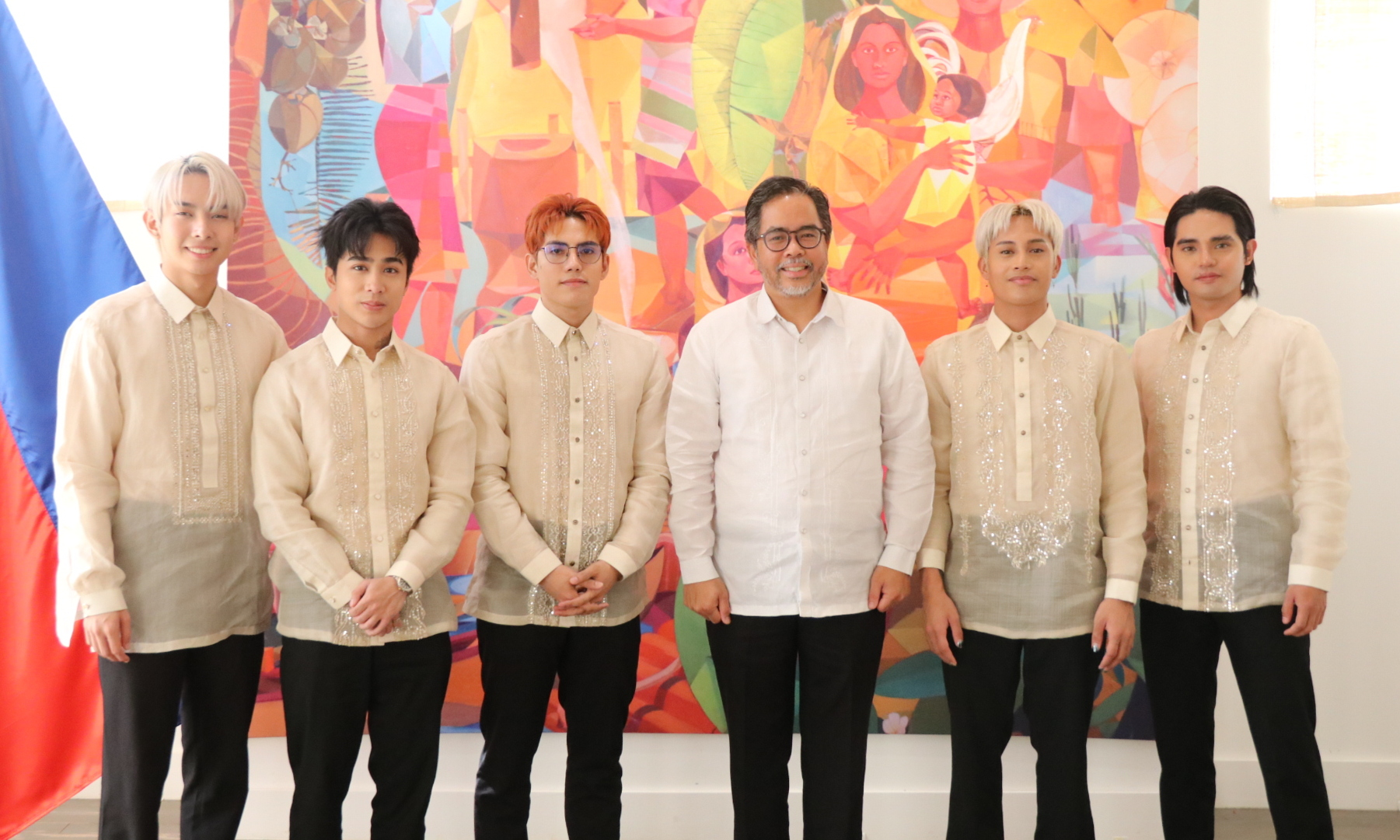
SB19 as ambassadors at a Sentro Rizal cultural center in Washington, D.C. in 2023, with Deputy Chief of Mission, Jaime Ramon Ascalon Jr.

Media outlets credit SB19 with pioneering P-pop music and bringing Filipino music to international recognition, (Note: Attributed to multiple references:) earning the group the moniker "Kings of P-pop". They have also been described as one of the leading acts in P-pop and the Philippine music industry. (Note: Attributed to multiple references:) Some scholars considered SB19's emergence and subsequent success a "turning point" for P-pop, while journalists have also commented that the band helped expand the Philippine music industry. Their success has been credited with encouraging the emergence of newer Filipino groups, suggesting that SB19 has opened opportunities for them. In 2022, Teen Vogue named them as one of the best boy bands of all time.

The media have argued that SB19 has challenged traditional notions of Original Pilipino Music (OPM). Elijah Pareño of Rolling Stone Philippines described them as having "rewritten the rules" of P-pop. Jenny Fernandez of Billboard Philippines argued that the band has set new standards for Filipino artists. Academics have noted the group's role in shaping new musical and cultural directions in the industry, while critics have highlighted their intensive performance training, synchronized choreography, self-written material, fashion, and artistic direction, which differ from earlier practices in the local music industry. Inquirer's Allan Policarpio stated that "the group has produced well-crafted songs and matching visuals that resonate. [...] They have won prestigious awards, shattered streaming records, and redefined what live performances could look like."

ABS-CBN executive Laurenti Dyogi once expressed gratitude to SB19 for paving the way for aspiring Filipino groups and has praised them for raising new expectations in the Philippine music industry. National Commission for Culture and the Arts (NCCA) commissioner Arvin Villalon has commented that SB19 "has significantly shaped the Philippine music landscape [with] their P-pop musical campaign and movement." Senator Kiko Pangilinan stated that SB19's emergence and success could help the Philippines develop its own "Korean Wave" and argued that the government should support efforts to promote Filipino culture. Allan Carreon of Esquire Philippines commented that SB19 proved that the Philippines is capable of producing "world-class talents", citing the group's sold-out arena concerts as evidence. Media and scholars have also portrayed SB19's success as a demonstration that Filipino artists can achieve widespread recognition while remaining rooted in Filipino language, culture, and identity. (Note: Attributed to multiple references:)

In 2022, Preview magazine listed SB19 as among the most influential people of the year, while Esquire Philippines named them among the most powerful people in the Philippines. SB19 also landed a spot on Billboard's Social 50 listing in 2020, where they peaked at number six, which made them the first and only Filipino group to secure a spot. The NCCA considered the band as "representatives of Filipino culture" and selected them in 2021 as youth ambassadors of the agency and its affiliate cultural organization, Sentro Rizal. NCCA recognized that the group's advocacies align with the organization's mission to promote Filipino heritage. They have also been appointed as tourism ambassadors by the Department of Tourism in 2026. The same year, the group co-developed the Senate Bill No. 2517, filed by Senator Bam Aquino, which aims to provide financial and logistical support for artists and members in the local creative industry. SB19 has been cited as inspiration by the Filipino boy band Sync and girl groups Bini and Xonara. Many artists have also expressed their admiration for SB19's work, including the Filipino girl group G22, singers Regine Velasquez and Sarah Geronimo, rapper Gloc-9, and musicians Ebe Dancel, Chito Miranda, and Ogie Alcasid.

== Other ventures ==
=== Endorsements ===
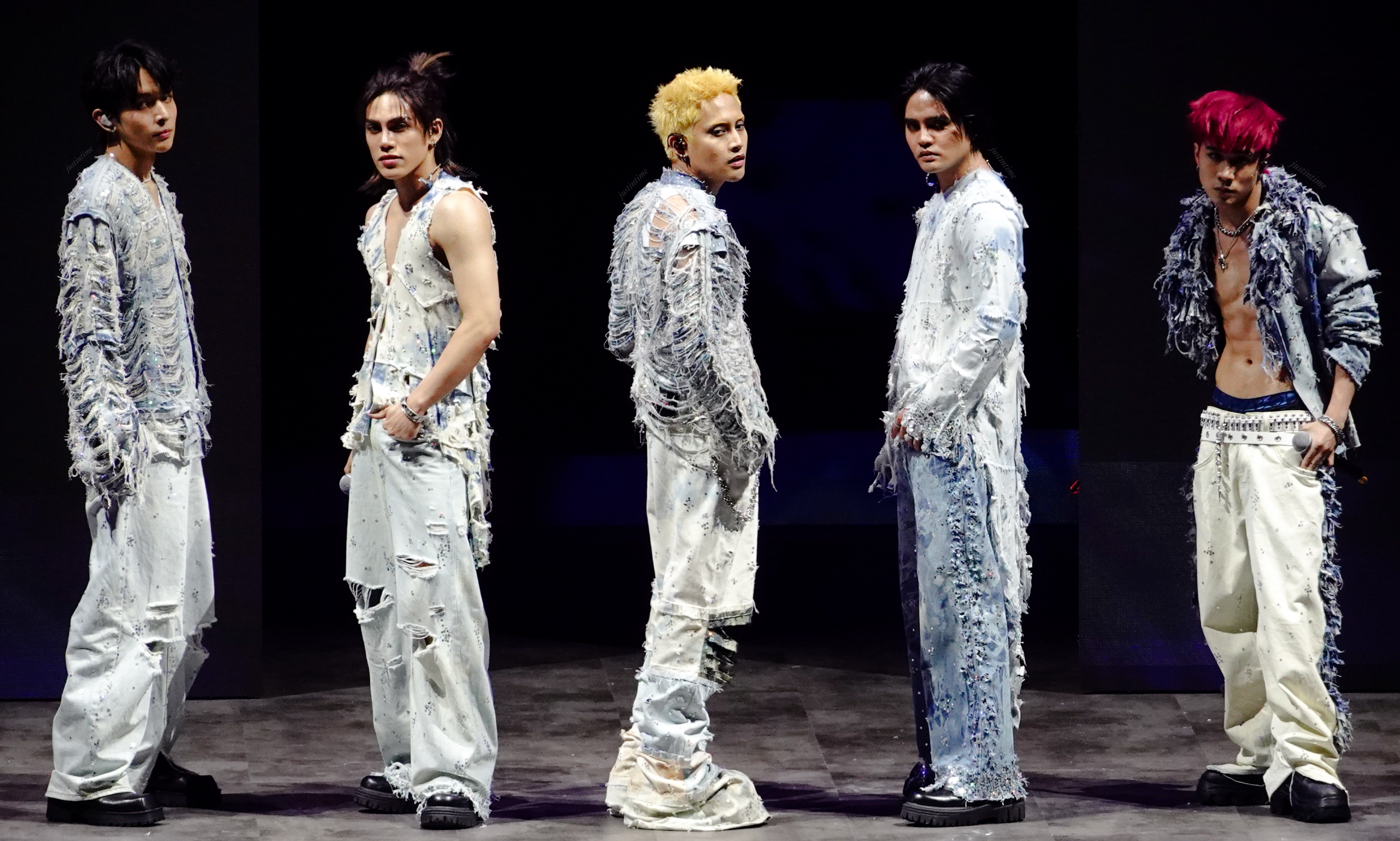
SB19 during their appearance at a fashion show curated by Bench in 2025

SB19 has made endorsements and partnerships with many brands. Their success, influence, large following, and youth appeal made them a sought-after figure by companies. The band has endorsed several retail companies, serving as brand ambassadors for the e-commerce site Lazada since 2021, the supermarket chain Puregold, and the clothing brand Bench since 2024. SB19 has engaged in branded events, including the Lazada Super Show, Puregold concerts since 2024, and the Bench fashion show. The group also collaborated with Puregold on a 2024 limited-edition Puregold Perks Card that featured their photos.

In finance, SB19 has endorsed the mobile payments platform GCash; they also collaborated in 2025 to release an SB19-themed sticker bundle used for personalizing GCash debit cards. They have been brand ambassadors for the electronics companies Acer since 2021 and Xiaomi since 2024, whose branded events, including some concerts and festivals, have also been attended by the group. The group has also partnered with wellness brands in 2026 to serve as their brand ambassadors, including the health and beauty chain Watsons and the life insurance company AIA Philippines.

SB19 has also endorsed several food brands. They had a brand deal with the soft drink brand Pepsi. The band has also endorsed multiple branded consumables, including Lucky Me! (noodles), Selecta (ice cream), CDO Idol (hotdogs), and Mang Juan (snacks). The group has endorsed the fast-food restaurants Pizza Hut, Dunkin' Donuts, and McDonald's, appearing in several commercials promoting the brands' products, including the Chicken McDo meal for the latter. SB19 has also partnered with McDonald's to launch the SB19 Meal, as well as with Dunkin' Donuts in releasing SB19-inspired menu items in the Philippines.

=== Philanthropy ===
SB19 has been involved with several charitable works throughout their career. The band curated a reshowing of their first online concert, SB19: Live from Manila, in 2020 to raise funds for communities in the Philippines impacted by typhoons Goni and Vamco. In 2021, SB19 launched a limited-edition merchandise line, with a portion of its proceeds donated to purchase personal protective equipment for Philippine hospitals, including the Philippine General Hospital (PGH), in response to the heightening COVID-19 pandemic in the Philippines. Later that year, the online concert, Forte, which they co-headlined in October, was in support of the Sr. Baptista Battig Music Foundation, an organization helping underprivileged youth who wish to pursue music. Following the onslaught of Tropical Storm Trami in the Philippines in 2024, SB19 organized a donation drive to support the relief efforts for the affected victims.

At the Wish 107.5 Music Awards, artists, including SB19, receive an honorarium of ₱100,000 for each award they win, which they donate to charities they wish to support. For their wins at the 2020, 2022, and 2023 editions of the awards, they have donated their proceeds to the Autism Society Philippines. At the 2021 ceremony, the band chose the House of Refuge Foundation, an organization that provides shelter to abandoned children, as their donee. In 2025, the group selected the Leukemic Indigents Fund Endowment and the PGH Medical Foundation as their beneficiaries.

=== Entrepreneurship ===
In 2023, SB19 established their own artists management and entertainment company, 1Z Entertainment, with each band member serving as the company's board of directors. The company serves as the band's talent agency, handling their activities following their departure from ShowBT and transition to self-management, which allowed them to pursue more artistic control over their work. The members also aimed to expand the Philippine music industry by developing their own artists through 1Z Entertainment, with Pablo stating that he envisioned the company to "challenge everything [they] see in the industry while promoting Filipino music, talent, and culture." In 2024, the company announced plans to debut a homegrown girl group and subsequently held auditions. 1Z Entertainment formally introduced and debuted a 7-member girl group, Xonara, in 2026, the first girl group to debut under the company. At present, Pablo serves as the company's president since 2026.

== Accolades and achievements ==
SB19 has received many awards throughout their career. The band has accumulated more than 10 trophies each from Awit Awards, P-pop Music Awards, PMPC Star Awards for Music, and Wish 107.5 Music Awards since their debut. Following their breakthrough, the group received awards recognizing their breakout in 2020 from the Awit Awards, the Myx Music Awards, and the Wish 107.5 Music Awards. Later, SB19 was honored the Best Artist Award – Singer at the 2023 Asia Artist Awards, named the Voices of Asia by Billboard Korea in 2024, and awarded the Favorite Asian Act at the 2024 Nickelodeon Kids' Choice Awards—the first among Filipino groups. The group has also consecutively won the Wish 107.5 Music Award for Wish Group of the Year from 2021 to 2024, and was named recipient of the Sudi National Music Award by the National Commission for Culture and the Arts in 2024. SB19 is the first Southeast Asian act to be nominated for Top Social Artist at the 2021 Billboard Music Awards. They are also a one-time Grammy Award nominee, earning their first nomination for the Best Asian Pop Music Performance category for their single "Visa" at the 69th Annual Grammy Awards. The band is the most-awarded artist at the Filipino Music Awards, and has also received the most awards in various ceremonies, including the 2022 Awit Awards, 2025 P-pop Music Awards, and multiple editions of the Wish 107.5 Music Awards. Throughout their career, SB19 has accumulated over one billion streams across all credits on the streaming platform Spotify, in addition to being named among the most-streamed Filipino artists on the platform in 2023.

== Members ==
- Josh – lead rapper, sub-vocalist
- Justin – sub-vocalist
- Ken – lead vocalist, lead rapper
- Pablo – leader, main rapper, lead vocalist, songwriter
- Stell – main vocalist

== Discography ==
Studio albums

- Get in the Zone (2020)
- Wakas at Simula (2026)

Extended plays

- Pagsibol (2021)
- Pagtatag! (2023)
- Simula at Wakas (2025)

== Filmography ==
- Show Break (2019–present)
- Ex-Mas (2020)
- Our Zone: Anniversary Series (2021)
- School Buddies (2022)
- Pagtatag! The Documentary (2024)
- Simula at Wakas: Kickoff Concert Film (2026)
- Wakas at Simula: The Trilogy Concert Finale in Cinemas (2026)

== Concerts ==
- Get in the Zone Nationwide Concert (2019–2020)
- SB19: Live from Manila (2020)
- Back in the Zone (2021)
- Forte: A Pop Orchestra Concert (2021)
- Our Zone: SB19's Third Anniversary Concert (2021)
- Dunkin' Presents SB19: Live in Araneta (2022)
- WYAT (Where You At) Tour (2022)
- Pagtatag! World Tour (2023–2024)
- Thanksgiving: SB19 6th Anniversary Celebration (2024)
- Simula at Wakas World Tour (2025)
- Fast Zone (2025)
- Wakas at Simula: The Trilogy Concert Finale (2026)
