= Pagtatag! The Documentary =

2024 Philippine documentary film directed by Jed Regala

- Theatrical release poster
- Directed by: Jed Regala
- Produced by: Jo Andrew Torlao; Irmay Ledesma; Xi-Anne Avanceña; Leah Gonzales; Bea Charlyn Laiño
- Starring: SB19
- Cinematography: Jed Regala
- Edited by: Arnex Nicolas; Aymer Alquinto; Celina Donato; Vanette Mendoza; Ricardo Gonzales, Jr.
- Music by: Len Calvo
- Production companies: First Light Studios; 1Z Entertainment
- Distributed by: Columbia Pictures Philippines; Netflix (streaming)
- Release date: August 28, 2024
- Running time: 74 minutes
- Country: Philippines
- Languages: Tagalog; English
- Box office: ₱21 million

Pagtatag! The Documentary is a documentary film that explores the Filipino boy band SB19's Pagtatag! World Tour from mid-2023 to 2024, highlighting behind-the-scenes aspects such as the group's creative process, emotional challenges, and transition to independent management. It was released in movie theaters on August 28, 2024. In 2025, the documentary was listed on Netflix and officially released on July 23, 2025. The film had a total gross of ₱21 million, making it the highest-grossing documentary film in the Philippines.

== Background and release ==
The documentary focuses on behind-the-scenes events during SB19's Pagtatag! era, chronicling their journey as they released the Pagtatag! extended play (EP), planned their comeback, and embarked on their second world tour. It captures the highs and lows the group faced over the year, including internal challenges, and the founding of their own record label, 1Z Entertainment. The film also featured candid moments with the members as they reflect on their careers and aspirations. It was directed by Jed Regala and produced by 1Z Entertainment and First Light Studios.

On May 20, 2024, the first teaser was released, featuring clips of the group offstage as they traveled to different venues worldwide and reflected on the experience of bringing the tour to life. A second teaser, released on July 12, included a scene of the group and their team participating in a pre-show ritual to energize themselves before going on stage. The documentary premiered in Philippine cinemas on August 28. It was later screened in Dubai at AI Ghurair Centre on September 21, and in Singapore at The Projector, Cineleisure on October 13. Additional international screenings were also held in the United States and Canada. It is also released the documentary in Genesis Cinema at London on December 15.

In 2025, the documentary was listed for screening at the 2025 Osaka Asian Film Festival, alongside Vice Ganda's film And the Breadwinner Is.... On June 26, Netflix Philippines announced the releasing of the documentary on their platform, it was scheduled to be released on July 23.

== Cast ==
- Pablo
- Josh
- Stell
- Ken
- Justin

== Synopsis ==
The film explores SB19's challenges during their Pagtatag! era and Pagtatag! World Tour, focusing on key events such as the trademark dispute with their former management, ShowBT Philippines, following the group's transition into becoming self-managed. The conflict, which barred the group from using the SB19 name, led to the cancellation of several overseas shows and sparked concerns about a possible disbandment. These issues were later resolved through an "amicable agreement".

== Reception ==
Stephanie Mayo of Billboard Philippines noted that viewers should not expect extensive concert footage, praising director Jed Regala for avoiding overused introductions or background material. She also highlighted the documentary insight into the group's creative process, describing the storytelling as economical and emotional, with a touching and hopeful conclusion.
