= Filipino Music Awards =

Accolade by the Modern Media Group Inc.

- Previous: Filipino Music Awards 2025; October 21, 2025; Next: Filipino Music Awards 2026; October 6, 2026
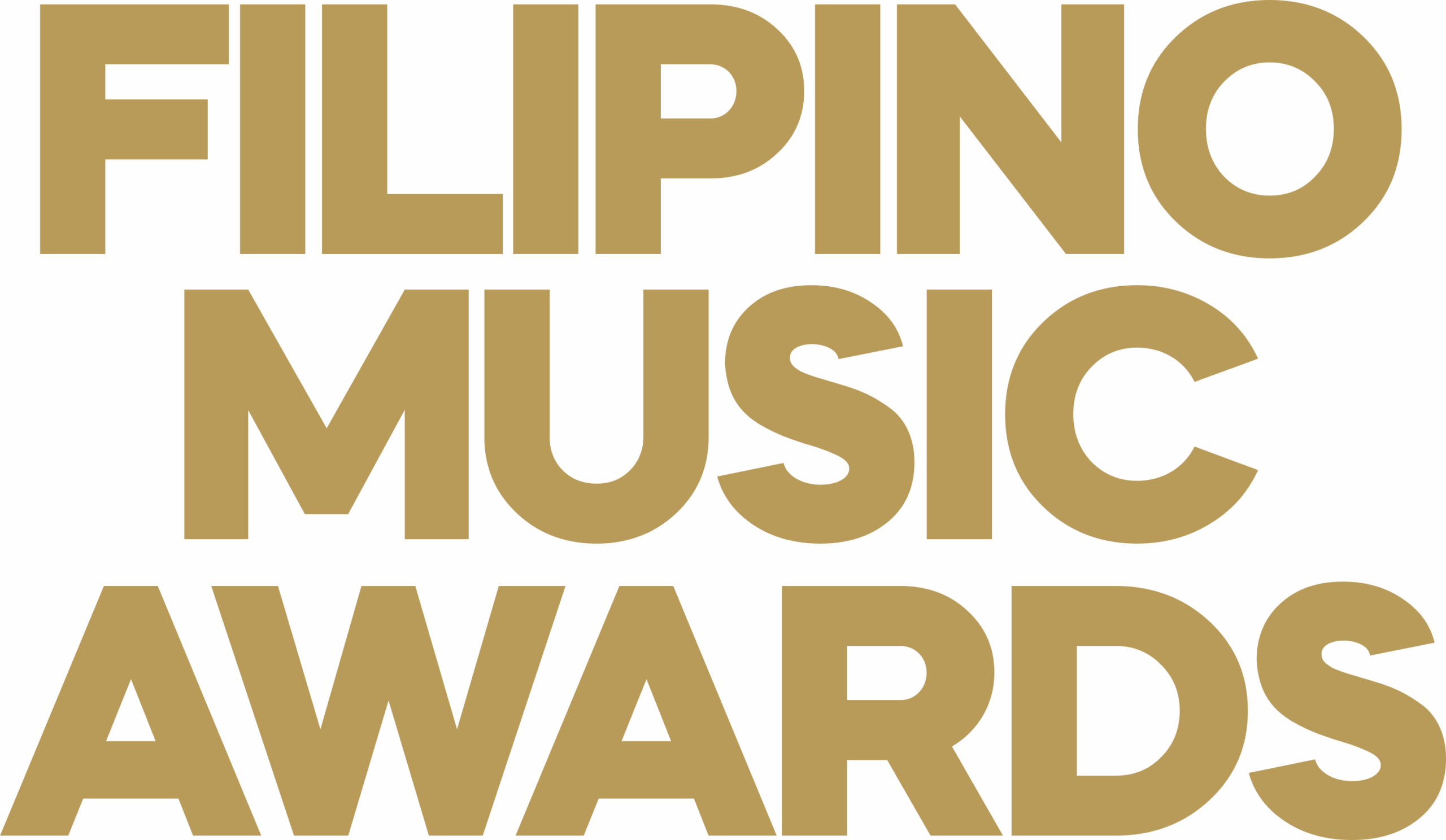
- Logo of the Filipino Music Awards
- Awarded for: Honoring the best of Filipino music
- Country: Philippines
- Presented by: Modern Media Group, Inc.
- First award: October 21, 2025; 12 months ago
- Website: filipinomusicawards.com

Television/radio coverage
- Network: TV5 (2025) GTV (2026)
- Produced by: AGC Power Holdings Corporation

The Filipino Music Awards (FMAs) are music awards presented by the Modern Media Group Inc., given to honor the best of Filipino music. The awards feature a total of 18 categories, whose winners are determined through jury selection, commercial performance data, and public voting. The inaugural ceremony took place on October 21, 2025, at the SM Mall of Asia Arena in Pasay.

== History ==
The Filipino Music Awards (FMAs) was first announced on August 29, 2025, aiming to gather music artists, industry trailblazers and fans for a night of honoring and recognizing the finest of Filipino music, billing itself as "the biggest and most prestigious celebration of Filipino music in the country". The awards are presented by the Modern Media Group, Inc., the company that owns the local edition of the Billboard magazine, Billboard Philippines, and others, including Rolling Stone Philippines, Nylon Manila and Robb Report Philippines. Its parent company, AGC Power Holdings Corporation, serves as the awards producer.

The 20 award categories of the Filipino Music Awards were announced on September 6, 2025, which are divided into 5 major categories. A total of 78 nominations are reported to be eyeing for the awards. Artists that performed at the awarding ceremony were revealed beginning on September 10. The awarding ceremony took place on October 21, 2025, at the SM Mall of Asia Arena in Pasay.

== Trophy ==
A photo of the Filipino Music Awards trophy

The trophies for the Filipino Music Awards is composed of a brass sculpture, depicting both a whirlwind and a pair of fan-like anahaw leaves unfolding, which differs in appearance based on how the trophy is viewed at an angle. The trophies are designed and made by artist and designer Ovvian Castrillo-Hill at her studio in Cavite. The trophies' design draws inspiration from a daluyong (lit. 'storm surge'), which symbolizes how awardees "disrupted the local music scene", noting that the music artists' power leaves an impact to the industry. Meanwhile, the anahaw leaves symbolizes the awards' Filipino origin, which is among the national symbols of the Philippines.

== Awarding process ==
The majority of the awards to be presented will have their winners determined through the selection and deliberation of the panel of judges, which include veterans in the Philippine music industry. For its Grand Awards, apart from jury deliberation, its awarding will also be determined through commercial performance data. The categories under People's Choice Awards are the only award categories that will have their winners determined through a nationwide public vote.

== Ceremonies ==
List of Filipino Music Awards ceremonies
Edition	Date of ceremony	Host(s)	Venue	City	Network	Ref.
1st	October 21, 2025	Joey Mead King; Michael Sager; Elijah Canlas; Aiyana Perlas	SM Mall of Asia Arena	Pasay	TV5	
2nd	October 6, 2026	Joey Mead King; Billy Crawford; KC Montero	SM Mall of Asia Arena	Pasay	GTV	

== Categories ==
The Filipino Music Awards introduced a total of 20 award categories, which are divided into 5 major categories: the Grand Awards (6 award categories), Legacy Awards (3), Genre Awards (6), People's Choice Awards (3) and Special Awards (2).

=== Grand Awards ===
- Album of the Year
- Song of the Year
- Tour of the Year
- Concert of the Year
- Artist of the Year
- Music Company of the Year (2025)
- Breakthrough Artist of the Year (2026–present)

=== Legacy Awards ===
- Lifetime Achievement Award
- Music Foundation of the Year
- Tribute Award

=== Genre Awards ===
- Alternative Song of the Year
- Folk Song of the Year
- Pop Song of the Year
- R&B Song of the Year
- Hip-hop Song of the Year
- Rock Song of the Year

=== People's Choice Awards ===
- People's Choice Awards – Artist
- People's Choice Awards – International Artist
- People's Choice Awards – Song
