= List of SB19 live performances =

SB19 live performances
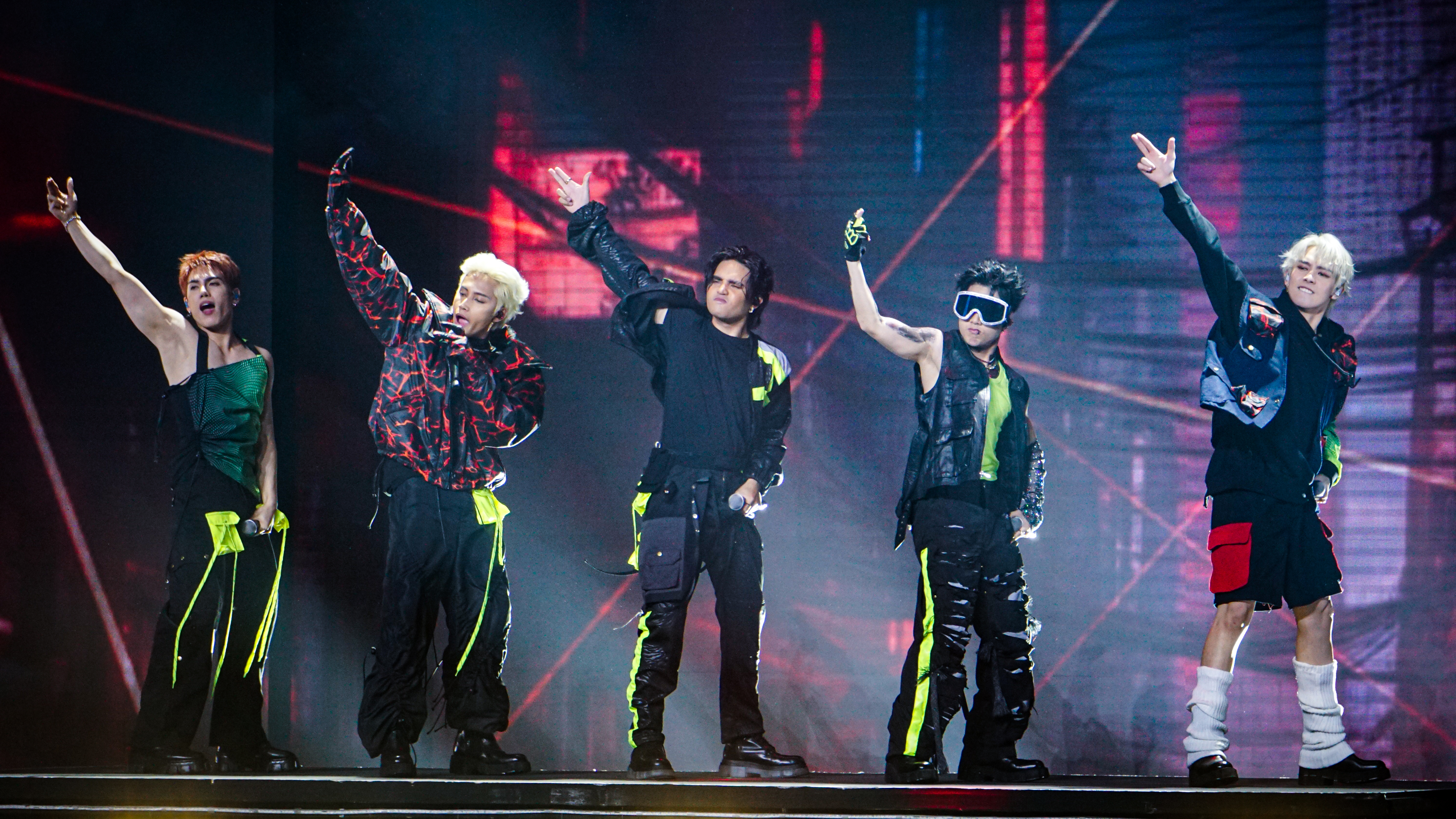
- SB19 performing at the Pagtatag! World Tour in 2023 (from left to right): Stell, Ken, Pablo, Josh, and Justin
- Concert tours: 4
- Concerts: 23
- Concert guest appearances: 4
- Music festivals: 25
- Fan meetings: 3
- Awards ceremonies: 9
- Television shows and specials: 62
- Sporting events: 2
- Other events: 33

The Filipino boy band SB19 has headlined several concerts and performed live at awards ceremonies, on television, and on other occasions. The band was formed in 2016 by a local subsidiary of the South Korean entertainment company, ShowBT, by selecting the members from a talent search to undergo training. While the group debuted in 2018 with the single "Tilaluha", the mainstream success of their next single, "Go Up" (2019), helped them appear on several local television shows. They staged their first concert tour, the Get in the Zone Nationwide Concert, in several cities in the Philippines from 2019 to 2020; its opening night at Cuneta Astrodome sold out 3,500 free tickets in three minutes. They received the Wish Breakthrough Artist of the Year at the 2020 Wish 107.5 Music Awards, and performed "Go Up"—their first live performance at an award ceremony.

At the height of the COVID-19 pandemic in the Philippines, SB19 staged several livestream concerts from 2020 to 2021. Their first, SB19: Live from Manila, was livestreamed in 2020, with the proceeds from its reshowing donated to the victims of Typhoon Vamco. In support of their first extended play (EP), Pagsibol (2021), the band headlined Back in the Zone in August 2021, which was named one of the most successful online concerts, reporting 14,000 unique simultaneous viewers. They co-headlined another online concert, Forte: A Pop Orchestra Concert, with 4th Impact in October 2021. The group celebrated the third anniversary of their debut with a two-day online concert, Our Zone, livestreamed from the Araneta Coliseum in November 2021, with performances of previously unreleased songs. They also performed at several virtual music festivals, including two virtual editions of the Philippine–Korea Cultural Exchange Festival in 2020 and 2021.

SB19 returned to performing with a live audience in 2022; they co-headlined a concert with Zephanie for Expo 2020 in Dubai in March 2022 and headlined a stadium concert, Dunkin' Presents: SB19, at the Araneta Coliseum in April 2022. The band performed at the 58th Binibining Pilipinas pageant and later embarked on their first world concert tour with the WYAT (Where You At) Tour (2022), comprising ten dates across four countries. The band has also headlined two editions of the annual PPOPCON in 2022 and 2023. The group released their second EP, Pagtatag!, in 2023 and embarked on its supporting tour, Pagtatag! World Tour (2023–2024), with four sold-out shows at the Araneta Coliseum. Following the release of their third EP, Simula at Wakas (2025), the group headlined the Simula at Wakas World Tour in 2025. It sold out two shows at the Philippine Arena. Additionally, SB19 has performed at the 2023 Asia Artist Awards and has been featured acts at several music festivals—the Round: ASEAN–Korea Music Festival 2023 in Indonesia, the Aurora Music Festival 2024 in Pampanga, ACON 2025 in Taiwan, and the upcoming Lollapalooza 2026 in the United States—making them the first Filipino artist to perform at the latter.

== Concerts ==
=== Headlining concert tours ===
List of headlining concert tours, showing dates, associated albums, locations, and number of shows
| Title | Dates | Associated album | Countries | Shows | Ref. |
|---|---|---|---|---|---|
| Get in the Zone Nationwide Concert | December 22, 2019 – January 18, 2020 | —N/a | Philippines | 4 | (Note: Attributed to multiple references:) |
| WYAT (Where You At) Tour | September 17, 2022 – December 18, 2022 | —N/a | Philippines; United Arab Emirates; United States; Singapore | 10 | (Note: Attributed to multiple references:) |
| Pagtatag! World Tour | June 24, 2023 – May 19, 2024 | Pagtatag! | Philippines; United States; Canada; United Arab Emirates; Japan | 18 | (Note: Attributed to multiple references:) |
| Simula at Wakas World Tour | May 31, 2025 – December 14, 2025 | Simula at Wakas | Philippines; Taiwan; United States; Canada; Singapore; Hong Kong; Japan; United Arab Emirates; Qatar; Thailand; Australia; New Zealand | 21 | (Note: Attributed to multiple references:) |

=== Headlining concerts ===
List of headlining concerts, showing co-headliners, dates, associated albums, locations, and number of shows
| Title | Co-headliner(s) | Date(s) | Associated album | City | Country | Show(s) | Ref. |
|---|---|---|---|---|---|---|---|
| SB19: Live from Manila (Note: A reshowing of SB19: Live from Manila livestream was broadcast as SB19: Monsoon Relief on November 28, 2020, with proceeds donated to the victims of Typhoon Vamco.) | —N/a | November 21, 2020 – November 28, 2020 | —N/a | Virtual | | 2 | |
| BYE2020 | Various (Note: In addition to SB19, several other artists also headlined BYE2020, consisting of Ben&Ben, Darren Espanto, Moira Dela Torre, Matthaios, the Itchyworms, Leanne & Naara, Maximillian, Peach Tree Rascals, Tate McRae, Glaiza de Castro, Kean Cipriano, Lala Vinzon, Zack Tabudlo, Keiko Necesario, Fern, Elha Nympha, Autotelic, Sud, Miguel Odron, VVS Collective, Ace Banzuelo, Paolo Sandejas, Earl Generao, Fana, Tala, J-Nine, and Dia Maté.) | December 31, 2020 | —N/a | Virtual | | 1 | |
| Back in the Zone | —N/a | August 1, 2021 – August 22, 2021 | Pagsibol | Virtual | | 3 | |
| Acer Day 2021: Live Your World – Online Concert | Various (Note: In addition to SB19, several other artists also headlined Acer Day 2021: Live Your World – Online Concert, consisting of Sarah Geronimo, Daniel Padilla, Kathryn Bernardo, Aina Abdul, VP Bá Vương, Gboyswag, Earth Patravee, and Prince.) | August 7, 2021 | —N/a | Virtual | | 1 | |
| Forte: A Pop Orchestra Concert | 4th Impact | October 17, 2021 – October 23, 2021 | —N/a | Virtual | | 4 | |
| Our Zone: SB19's Third Anniversary Concert | —N/a | November 27, 2021 – November 28, 2021 | —N/a | Virtual (Note: While Our Zone: SB19's Third Anniversary Concert was held virtually, the concert was livestreamed from the Araneta Coliseum in Quezon City, Philippines.) | | 2 | |
| Expo 2020 | Zephanie | March 16, 2022 | —N/a | Dubai | United Arab Emirates | 1 | |
| PPOPCON 2022 | Various (Note: In addition to SB19, several other artists also headlined PPOPCON 2022, consisting of Bini, 1st.One, Press Hit Play, Kaia, MNL48, BGYO, VXON, Alamat, and 4th Impact.) | April 10, 2022 | —N/a | Quezon City | Philippines | 1 | |
| Dunkin' Presents: SB19 (Note: Dunkin' Presents: SB19 was initially scheduled for March 19, 2020, with the title Dunkin' Presents: Give in to SB19, but was postponed to April 23, 2022, with its new title due to the COVID-19 pandemic in the Philippines.) | —N/a | April 23, 2022 | —N/a | Quezon City | Philippines | 1 | |
| Acer Day 2022: The Green Mark Concert | Parokya ni Edgar; Sud; CLR, Awi, and Yow; Janina Vela; Adie; Kaia | August 7, 2022 | —N/a | Pasay | Philippines | 1 | |
| PPOPCON 2023 | Various (Note: In addition to SB19, several other artists also headlined PPOPCON 2023, consisting of Alamat, Bini, Felip, Josh Cullen, Sheki, BGYO, Kaia, G22, Press Hit Play, VXON, Hori7on, MNL48, P-pop Generation, Calista, D1one, Yes My Love, and Yara.) | July 16, 2023 | —N/a | Quezon City | Philippines | 1 | |
| Watsons Playlist: The Feel Great Concert | Ben&Ben; Zack Tabudlo | September 23, 2023 | —N/a | Quezon City | Philippines | 1 | |
| Puregold: Nasa Atin ang Panalo – Thanksgiving Concert | Flow G Bini; SunKissed Lola | July 12, 2024 | —N/a | Quezon City | Philippines | 1 | |
| Acer Day 2024 | Sandara Park; G22; Rico Blanco; Ebe Dancel; TJ Monterde; Cup of Joe | August 4, 2024 | —N/a | Pasay | Philippines | 1 | |
| Watsons Playlist: The P-pop Power Concert | Hori7on; Kaia; G22; Alamat | August 18, 2024 | —N/a | Pasay | Philippines | 1 | |
| ThanksgiVIng: SB19 6th Anniversary Celebration | —N/a | October 26, 2024 – October 27, 2024 | —N/a | Quezon City | Philippines | 2 | |
| Puregold OPMCON 2025 | Bini; Flow G G22; Kaia; Skusta Clee; SunKissed Lola | July 5, 2025 | —N/a | Bocaue | Philippines | 1 | |
| Acer Day 2025 | G22; Sarah Geronimo | August 9, 2025 | —N/a | Pasay | Philippines | 1 | |
| Fast Zone | Francis Libiran | October 26, 2025 | —N/a | Quezon City | Philippines | 1 | |
| Wakas at Simula: The Trilogy Concert Finale | —N/a | April 18, 2026 | Pagsibol; Pagtatag! Simula at Wakas; Wakas at Simula | Parañaque | Philippines | 1 | |
| Watsons Playlist: Own the Moment | December Avenue; Maki | May 31, 2026 | —N/a | Pasay | Philippines | 1 | |
| Puregold OPMCON Generations 2026 | Various (Note: In addition to SB19, several other artists also headlined Puregold OPMCON Generations 2026, consisting of Ben&Ben, Alamat, Flow G, Skusta Clee, SunKissed Lola, G22, Kaia, and Xonara.) | July 11, 2026 | —N/a | Quezon City | Philippines | 1 | |
| Acer Day 2026 | Various (Note: In addition to SB19, several other artists also headlined Acer Day 2026, consisting of Hey June!, Fitterkarma, Earl Agustin, El Manu, Jessy Kang, and Dionela.) | August 30, 2026 | —N/a | Quezon City | Philippines | 1 | |

=== Guest appearances ===
List of concert guest appearances, showing headlining artists, dates, locations, and songs performed
| Title | Headlining artist | Date | City | Country | Song(s) performed | Ref. |
|---|---|---|---|---|---|---|
| Luv-Anne: The Comeback | Anne Curtis | June 11, 2022 | Pasay | Philippines | "Mapa" | |
| What Tour Feels Like | Jvke | September 2, 2023 | Boston | United States | "Gento"; "Bazinga"; "I Want You"; "Crimzone"; "Golden Hour" | |
| KZ Xperience | KZ Tandingan | September 23, 2023 | Pasay | Philippines | Unknown | |
| Pure Energy: One More Time | Gary Valenciano | December 22, 2024 | Quezon City | Philippines | "Babalik Ka Rin" | |

== Music festivals ==
List of music festival performances, showing dates, locations, and songs performed
| Date | Title | City | Country | Song(s) performed | Ref. |
|---|---|---|---|---|---|
| September 28, 2019 | Philippine–Korea Cultural Exchange Festival 2019 | Pasay | Philippines | "Boy with Luv"; "Idol" | |
| February 10, 2020 | UP Fair: Hiwaga | Quezon City | Philippines | Unknown | |
| September 26, 2020 | G Music Fest 2020 | Virtual | | Unknown | |
| October 11, 2020 | Philippine–Korea Cultural Exchange Festival 2020 | Virtual (Note: While the Philippine–Korea Cultural Exchange Festival 2020 was held virtually, SB19's performances were filmed at the National Museum of Natural History and Rizal Park, both in Manila, Philippines.) | | "Alab (Burning)"; "Go Up" | |
| September 25, 2021 | Philippine–Korea Cultural Exchange Festival 2021 | Virtual | | Unknown | |
| September 26, 2021 | G Music Fest 2021 | Virtual | | Unknown | |
| January 9, 2022 | Round: ASEAN–Korea Music Festival 2021 | Virtual (Note: While the Round: ASEAN–Korea Music Festival 2021 was held virtually, SB19's performances were filmed at the Cultural Center of the Philippines Complex in Pasay, Philippines.) | | "What?"; "Tilaluha"; "Mapa"; "Bazinga"; "Go Up" | |
| October 21, 2022 | Popstival 2022 | Parañaque | Philippines | Unknown | |
| December 9, 2022 | Head in the Clouds Music and Arts Festival 2022 Manila | Parañaque | Philippines | "What?"; "WYAT (Where You At)"; "Nyebe"; "Mapa"; "Mana"; "Bazinga" | |
| October 21, 2023 | Round: ASEAN–Korea Music Festival 2023 | Jakarta | Indonesia | "Gento"; "Ilaw"; "I Want You"; "Crimzone" | |
| October 22, 2023 | Playlist Live Festival 2023 | Bandung | Indonesia | Unknown | |
| November 11, 2023 | Fusion: The Philippine Music Festival 2023 | Pasay | Philippines | Unknown | |
| April 6, 2024 | Aurora Music Festival 2024 | Mabalacat | Philippines | "Gento"; "I Want You"; "Liham"; "Mapa"; "Crimzone" | |
| June 9, 2024 | Pistang Pinoy sa Korea 2024 (Note: The Pistang Pinoy sa Korea 2024 was held in concurrence with the Wish South Korea: The Unveiling.) | Busan | South Korea | Unknown | |
| December 14, 2024 | JBL Sound Fest 2024 | Pasay | Philippines | "Gento"; "Mapa"; "Nyebe"; "Crimzone" | |
| June 14, 2025 | Bicol Loco Hot Air Balloon and Music Festival | Legazpi | Philippines | Unknown | |
| November 22, 2025 | Aurora Music Festival Cebu 2025 | Cebu City | Philippines | Unknown | |
| December 7, 2025 | ACON 2025 | Kaohsiung | Taiwan | "Dam"; "8TonBall"; "Dungka!"; "Crimzone" | |
| March 15, 2026 | D.U.N.K. Showcase | Yokohama | Japan | Unknown | |
| May 2, 2026 | Aurora Music Festival 2026 | Mabalacat | Philippines | "Everblack"; "Gento" | |
| May 3, 2026 | Aurora Music Festival 2026 | Mabalacat | Philippines | "Everblack"; "Gento" | |
| July 30, 2026 | Lollapalooza 2026 | Chicago | United States | "Dam"; "Gento"; "Lawless"; "Emoji"; "Mapa"; "Wakas"; "Mga Kababayan"; "Visa"; "Dungka!"; "Crimzone" | |
| August 14, 2026 | Summer Sonic 2026 | Suita | Japan | "Dam"; "Gento"; "Emoji"; "Quit"; "Memories"; "Visa"; "Dungka!"; "Lawless"; "Crimzone" | |
| August 15, 2026 | Summer Sonic 2026 | Chiba | Japan | "Dam"; "Gento"; "Lawless"; "Moonlight"; "I Want You"; "Visa"; "Crimzone" | |
| October 24, 2026 | One Zone Fest | Quezon City | Philippines | "Visa"; "Freedom"; "Crimzone"; "Mana"; "Memories"; "Tilaluha" | |
| October 25, 2026 | One Zone Fest | Quezon City | Philippines | "Visa"; "Freedom"; "Crimzone"; "Mana"; "Memories"; "Tilaluha" | |
| April 2027 | Coachella 2027 | Indio | United States | TBD | |
| 2027 | KPopWorld Festival | San Antonio | United States | TBD | |

== Fan meetings ==
List of fan meeting performances, showing dates, locations, and songs performed
| Title | Date(s) | City | Country | Song(s) performed | Ref. |
|---|---|---|---|---|---|
| SB19: Start of the Best | December 19, 2018 | San Juan | Philippines | "Tilaluha"; "Love Goes" | |
| SB19: Start of the Best | December 23, 2018 | Davao City | Philippines | "Tilaluha"; "Love Goes" | |
| One Zone: SB19 Half-a-Decade Celebration | October 28, 2023 | Quezon City | Philippines | "Gento"; "I Want You"; "Crimzone"; "Freedom"; "Go Up"; "Alab (Burning)"; "SLMT" | |
| I WaS There Thanksgiving Fanmeet | August 8, 2026 | Rohnert Park | United States | Unknown | |
| I WaS There Thanksgiving Fanmeet | August 9, 2026 | Rohnert Park | United States | Unknown | |
| I WaS There Thanksgiving Fanmeet | August 18, 2026 | Yokohama | Japan | Unknown | |

== Awards ceremonies ==
List of awards ceremony performances, showing dates, locations, and songs performed
| Date | Ceremony | City | Country | Song(s) performed | Ref. |
|---|---|---|---|---|---|
| January 19, 2020 | 5th Wish 107.5 Music Awards | Pasay | Philippines | "Go Up" | |
| January 17, 2021 | 6th Wish 107.5 Music Awards | Quezon City | Philippines | "Hanggang sa Huli"; "Alab (Burning)" | |
| July 4, 2021 | 1st TikTok Awards Philippines | Virtual | | "Mapa"; "What?" | |
| August 7, 2021 | 16th Myx Music Awards | Virtual | | "Mapa" | |
| November 29, 2021 | 34th Awit Awards | Virtual | | "Bazinga" | |
| January 30, 2022 | 7th Wish 107.5 Music Awards | Quezon City | Philippines | "What?" | |
| December 14, 2023 | 8th Asia Artist Awards | Bocaue | Philippines | "Gento"; "Mana"; "Bazinga"; "Crimzone" | |
| June 21, 2025 | Hito Music Awards 2025 | Taipei | Taiwan | "Dam"; "Dungka!"; "World Top"; "Gento" | |
| October 21, 2025 | 1st Filipino Music Awards | Pasay | Philippines | "Dam"; "Kapangyarihan" | |

== Television shows and specials ==
List of television performances, showing dates, country of origin, and songs performed
| Date | Television show | Country | Song(s) performed | Ref. |
|---|---|---|---|---|
| July 19, 2019 | Unang Hirit | Philippines | "Go Up" | |
| August 7, 2019 | Letters and Music | Philippines | "Go Up"; "Tilaluha" | |
| September 12, 2019 | Umagang Kay Ganda | Philippines | "Go Up" | |
| September 15, 2019 | ASAP Natin 'To | Philippines | "Go Up" | |
| October 10, 2019 | Tonight with Boy Abunda | Philippines | "Go Up" | |
| October 17, 2019 | Unang Hirit | Philippines | "Love Goes" | |
| October 19, 2019 | Studio 7 | Philippines | "Tilaluha" | |
| October 20, 2019 | Gandang Gabi, Vice! | Philippines | "Go Up" | |
| October 30, 2019 | Magandang Buhay | Philippines | "Go Up" | |
| November 30, 2019 | The Clash | Philippines | "Go Up"; "Ddu-Du Ddu-Du" | |
| December 31, 2019 | Unang Hirit | Philippines | "Alab (Burning)" | |
| January 4, 2020 | I Can See Your Voice | Philippines | "Go Up" | |
| January 12, 2020 | ASAP Natin 'To | Philippines | "Go Up" | |
| January 13, 2020 | Umagang Kay Ganda | Philippines | "Alab (Burning)" | |
| February 16, 2020 | ASAP Natin 'To | Philippines | "Bang Bang Bang"; "Fantastic Baby" | |
| March 4, 2020 | Tonight with Arnold Clavio | Philippines | "Alab (Burning)" | |
| March 10, 2020 | It's Showtime | Philippines | "Alab (Burning)" | |
| March 10, 2020 | Tonight with Boy Abunda | Philippines | "Alab (Burning)" | |
| May 3, 2020 | ASAP Natin 'To | Philippines | "Ikako" | |
| June 29, 2020 | Letters and Music | Philippines | "Alab (Burning)"; "Ikako" | |
| October 18, 2020 | Sunday Noontime Live! | Philippines | "Hanggang sa Huli"; "Love Goes" | |
| November 10, 2020 | Lazada 11.11 Super Show | Philippines | "Go Up"; "Alab (Burning)"; "Boy with Luv" | |
| December 11, 2020 | Lazada 12.12 Super Show | Philippines | "Finesse" | |
| April 29, 2021 | Unang Hirit | Philippines | "What?" | |
| May 9, 2021 | All-Out Sundays | Philippines | "What?" | |
| May 16, 2021 | ASAP Natin 'To | Philippines | "What?" | |
| May 23, 2021 | ASAP Natin 'To | Philippines | "Mapa" | |
| June 5, 2021 | Lazada 6.6 Super Show | Philippines | "What?" | |
| August 8, 2021 | ASAP Natin 'To | Philippines | "Bazinga" | |
| November 10, 2021 | Lazada 11.11 Super Show | Philippines | "Mana" | |
| March 19, 2022 | Pinoy Big Brother: Kumunity Season 10 | Philippines | "Kabataang Pinoy" | |
| March 26, 2022 | Lazada Epic 10th Birthday Super Party | Philippines | "SLMT" | |
| April 28, 2022 | Pinoy Big Brother: Kumunity Season 10 | Philippines | "Go Up" | |
| April 29, 2022 | Pinoy Big Brother: Kumunity Season 10 | Philippines | "Kabataang Pinoy" | |
| May 1, 2022 | Pinoy Big Brother: Kumunity Season 10 | Philippines | "Bazinga"; "Mapa" | |
| September 4, 2022 | ASAP Natin 'To | Philippines | "WYAT (Where You At)" | |
| September 13, 2022 | Wowowin | Philippines | "WYAT (Where You At)" | |
| September 20, 2022 | It's Showtime | Philippines | "WYAT (Where You At)" | |
| September 24, 2022 | Eat Bulaga! | Philippines | "Mapa"; "WYAT (Where You At)" | |
| September 25, 2022 | ASAP Natin 'To | Philippines | "Hanggang sa Huli" | |
| November 4, 2022 | Good Day New York | United States | "WYAT (Where You At)" | |
| May 21, 2023 | All-Out Sundays | Philippines | "Gento" | |
| May 27, 2023 | I Can See Your Voice | Philippines | "Gento" | |
| June 9, 2023 | Family Feud | Philippines | "Gento" | |
| June 11, 2023 | ASAP Natin 'To | Philippines | "I Want You" | |
| August 2, 2023 | KTLA 5 Morning News | United States | "Gento" | |
| August 9, 2023 | Good Day New York | United States | "Gento" | |
| August 29, 2023 | New York Living | United States | "Gento" | |
| October 29, 2023 | The Voice Generations | Philippines | "Liham" | |
| March 31, 2024 | All-Out Sundays | Philippines | "Gento"; "Crimzone" | |
| May 26, 2024 | All-Out Sundays | Philippines | "Moonlight" | |
| October 21, 2024 | It's Showtime (Note: The television performance in an episode of the noontime variety show It's Showtime, dated October 21, 2024, was part of the show's Magpasikat anniversary special.) | Philippines | "Liham" | |
| November 2, 2024 | Atom Boyz II | Taiwan | "Gento" | |
| March 2, 2025 | All-Out Sundays | Philippines | "Dam" | |
| March 8, 2025 | It's Showtime | Philippines | "Dam" | |
| April 6, 2025 | ASAP | Philippines | "Dam" | |
| April 26, 2025 | It's Showtime | Philippines | "Dungka!" | |
| August 23, 2025 | ASAP | Philippines | "Umaaligid" | |
| February 28, 2026 | It's Showtime | Philippines | "Visa" | |
| April 26, 2026 | All-Out Sundays | Philippines | "Visa" | |
| August 13, 2026 | Dayday | Japan | "Lawless" | |

== Sporting events ==
List of sporting event performances, showing dates, locations, and songs performed
| Date | Event | City | Country | Song(s) performed | Ref. |
|---|---|---|---|---|---|
| January 13, 2024 | Asia Pacific Predator League | Pasay | Philippines | "Ace Your World"; "Gento"; "Bazinga"; "Crimzone" | |
| November 30, 2025 | Honor of Kings International Championship 2025 | Parañaque | Philippines | "Burn the Flame"; "Dungka!"; "Crimzone" | |

== Other events ==
List of performances in other events, showing dates, locations, and songs performed
| Date | Event | City | Country | Song(s) performed | Ref. |
|---|---|---|---|---|---|
| October 11, 2020 | YouTube FanFest 2020 | Virtual | | "Love Goes"; "Go Up" | |
| August 29, 2021 | YouTube FanFest 2021 | Virtual | | "Mana"; "Bazinga" | |
| October 5, 2021 | TM Doble Dekada Piyestang Pina-Easy | Virtual | | Unknown | |
| June 18, 2022 | Acer x Adidas: Bring the A Game Pep Rally | Pasay | Philippines | "Live It Up"; "Bazinga"; "Mapa" | |
| July 31, 2022 | Binibining Pilipinas 2022 | Quezon City | Philippines | "Win Your Heart"; "Bazinga"; "SLMT" | |
| November 11, 2022 | YouTube FanFest 2022 | Singapore | | "WYAT (Where You At)" | |
| December 10, 2022 | TM FunPasko Party | Dumaguete | Philippines | Unknown | |
| December 15, 2022 | Binurda: CCP Christmas Show and Building Facade Lighting | Pasay | Philippines | "What?"; "Mapa" | |
| December 31, 2022 | SM Mall of Asia New Year's Eve Countdown to 2023 | Pasay | Philippines | Unknown | |
| February 12, 2023 | National Arts Month Opening Celebration | Manila | Philippines | "WYAT (Where You At)" | |
| October 7, 2023 | BYS Fashion Week | Makati | Philippines | "I Want You" | |
| October 8, 2023 | Pepsi Pulse 2023 | Pasay | Philippines | "Gento"; "I Want You"; "Liham"; "Crimzone" | |
| November 10, 2023 | TeaM Fair 2023 | Butuan | Philippines | Unknown | |
| December 31, 2023 | Nostalgia Meets the Future: Ayala Avenue New Year's Eve Countdown to 2024 | Makati | Philippines | "Gento" | |
| March 9, 2024 | Abrenian Kawayan Festival Variety Show | Bangued | Philippines | "Gento" | |
| April 19, 2024 | Pepsi Pulse 2024 | Davao City | Philippines | "Gento" | |
| April 20, 2024 | Xiaomi Fan Festival 2024 | Pasay | Philippines | "Gento"; "Mapa"; "Bazinga"; "Crimzone" | |
| June 9, 2024 | Wish South Korea: The Unveiling | Busan | South Korea | "Moonlight"; "Ready" | |
| June 12, 2024 | Mega Ball 2024 | Taguig | Philippines | "O Bayan Ko"; "Lupang Hinirang" | |
| June 17, 2024 | Naliyagan Festival 2024 | Prosperidad | Philippines | "Gento" | |
| July 7, 2024 | Binibining Pilipinas 2024 | Quezon City | Philippines | "Win Your Heart"; "Moonlight" | |
| August 28, 2024 | Billboard K Power 100 | Seoul | South Korea | "Gento" | |
| October 11, 2024 | GCash 20th Anniversary Gala Night | Pasay | Philippines | "Moonlight"; "Gento" | |
| October 12, 2024 | TeaM Fair 2024 | Malolos | Philippines | Unknown | |
| October 15, 2024 | Billboard Philippines: Mainstage – The Year One Anniversary | Pasay | Philippines | "Mana"; "Crimzone" | |
| December 31, 2024 | Kapuso Countdown to 2025: Isa sa Puso | Pasay | Philippines | "What?"; "Nyebe"; "Gento"; "Crimzone" | |
| March 21, 2025 | Bench Body of Work 2025 | Pasay | Philippines | "Dam" | |
| June 15, 2025 | Binibining Pilipinas 2025 | Quezon City | Philippines | "Moonlight"; "I Want You" | |
| October 12, 2025 | Sama sa Roma 2025: SB19 – Live in Rome | Rome | Italy | "Dungka!" | |
| December 31, 2025 | NYE at the 5th: New Year's Countdown | Taguig | Philippines | "Dam"; "8TonBall"; "Time"; "Dungka!"; "Crimzone" | |
| June 20, 2026 | Stella Dance Jam: Philippines x Japan Friendship 2026 | Parañaque | Philippines | Unknown | |
| July 28, 2026 | Grammy Museum: Global Spin Live | Los Angeles | United States | "Gento"; "Wakas" | |
| August 29, 2026 | NBA House Philippines | Makati | Philippines | Unknown | |
| September 19, 2026 | Beyond the Beat: The Next-Level ULT Power Sound Experience | Parañaque | Philippines | Unknown | |
| October 10, 2026 | NBA House Macao | Macau | China | Unknown | |
| November 17, 2026 | 49th ASEAN Summit and Related Summits closing ceremony | Pasay | Philippines | "Gento"; "Together in Motion" | |
