= SB19 videography =

Videography of Filipino boy band

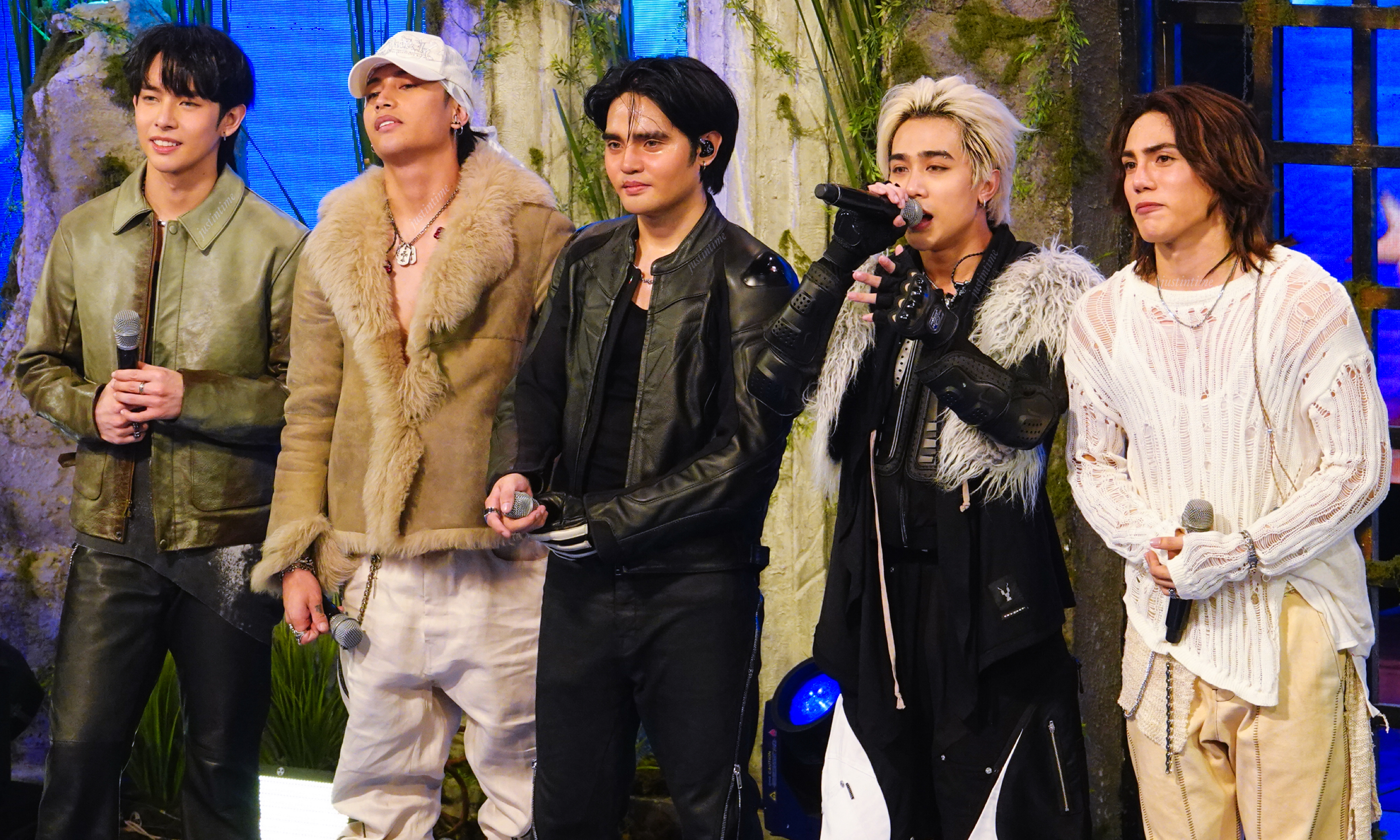
SB19 during their appearance on It's Showtime in March 2025 (from left to right): Justin, Ken, Pablo, Josh, and Stell

The Filipino boy band SB19 has appeared in various visual media, including numerous music videos, television shows, online shows, and commercials. The band was formed in 2016 by a local subsidiary of the South Korean entertainment company ShowBT by selecting the members from a talent search to undergo training. They debuted in 2018 with the single "Tilaluha", which had their first accompanying music video. However, they only achieved a breakthrough with the single "Go Up" (2019) after a video of the group dancing to the song went viral on social media. That helped them appear on several local television shows, like morning news shows Unang Hirit and Umagang Kay Ganda. The group released the music video for their third single, "Alab (Burning)", in 2020, which won the Music Video of the Year category at the 2021 Myx Music Awards.

SB19's first extended play (EP), Pagsibol, was released in 2021, supported by three videos for the songs "What?", "Bazinga", and "SLMT". The band member Justin directed the music video for "What?", which gained over one million views in its first 24 hours of release and was praised for its depiction of the Murillo–Velarde map of the Philippines. The video for "Bazinga", directed by Jonathan Tal Placido, won Music Video of the Year at the 14th PMPC Star Awards for Music in 2024. The group released "WYAT (Where You At)" in 2022, accompanied by a music video directed by Jireh Christian Bascano, which received nominations for the Music Video of the Year category at the 2023 Awit Awards and 15th PMPC Star Awards for Music, winning the category at the latter. While touring for the song's namesake tour that year, the band debuted on American television, appearing on Good Day New York. In addition, they collaborated with Ben&Ben for the music video for "Mapa (Band Version)" (2021) and with Bini for "Kabataang Pinoy" (2022).

SB19 released their second EP, Pagtatag!, in 2023, with music videos for the songs "Gento", "I Want You", and "Freedom". The first two, directed by Kerbs Balagtas and Jed Regala, respectively, earned nominations for the Music Video of the Year category at the 2024 Awit Awards. In 2024, they appeared in the documentary film directed by Regala, Pagtatag! The Documentary, documenting the Pagtatag! World Tour (2023–2024). It grossed a total of ₱21 million, becoming the highest-grossing Filipino documentary film in the Philippines. That year, the band released collaborative singles and music videos with other artists: they collaborated with Ian Asher and Terry Zhong for "Moonlight", apl.de.ap for "Ready", and Gloc-9 for "Kalakal", with the video for the latter being named by Billboard Philippines as one of the best music videos of 2024. The group released their third EP, Simula at Wakas, in 2025, supported by three music videos. The first was for the EP's lead single, "Dam", directed by Alanshiii, which became the second most-viewed music video by a Filipino artist in 24 hours, with four million views. The video won Music Video of the Year at the P-pop Music Awards 2025. That year, they also collaborated with Sarah Geronimo for the music video for "Umaaligid".

Since their debut, SB19 has been recurring performers on noontime variety shows, namely ASAP, (Note: Attributed to multiple references:) It's Showtime, (Note: Attributed to multiple references:) and All-Out Sundays. (Note: Attributed to multiple references:) The group has also endorsed numerous brands, appearing in many commercials, including for Pizza Hut, GCash, and McDonald's. In addition to SB19's music career, the group star in their own variety show series Show Break (2018–present), and has ventured into acting with main roles in the self-released online short film Ex-Mas (2020) and the web series Our Zone: Anniversary Series (2021) and School Buddies (2022).

== Music videos ==
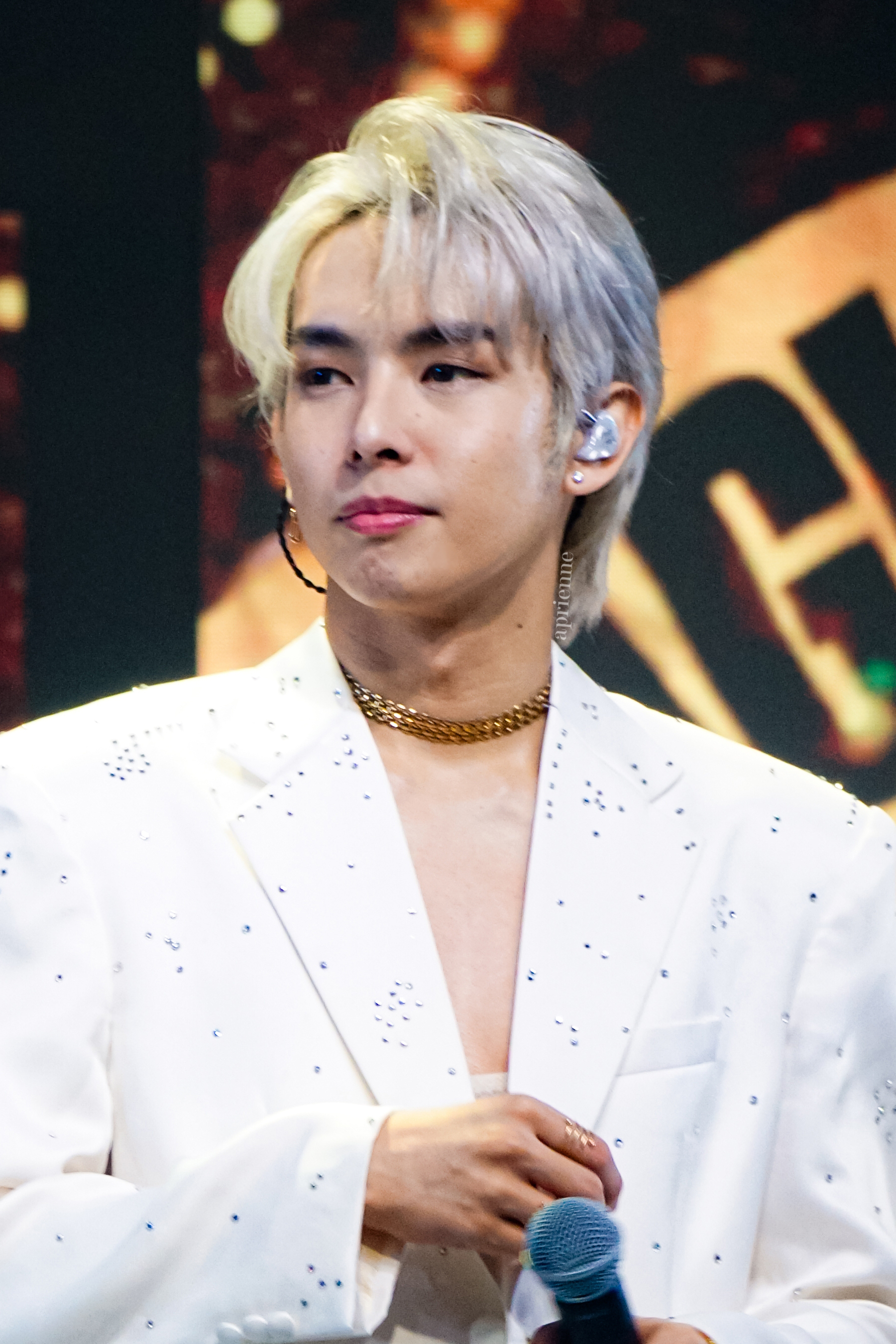
SB19 member Justin directed several music videos for the group, including "What?" (2021).

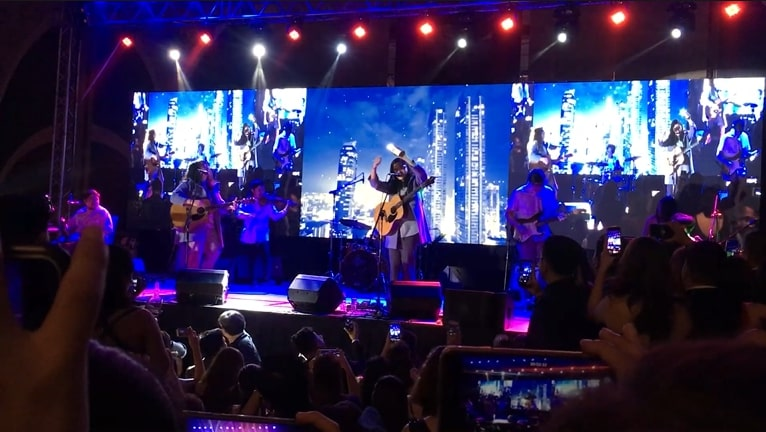
In the music video for “Mapa (Band Version)” (2021), Ben&Ben performs the song with SB19 in the Manila Metropolitan Theater.

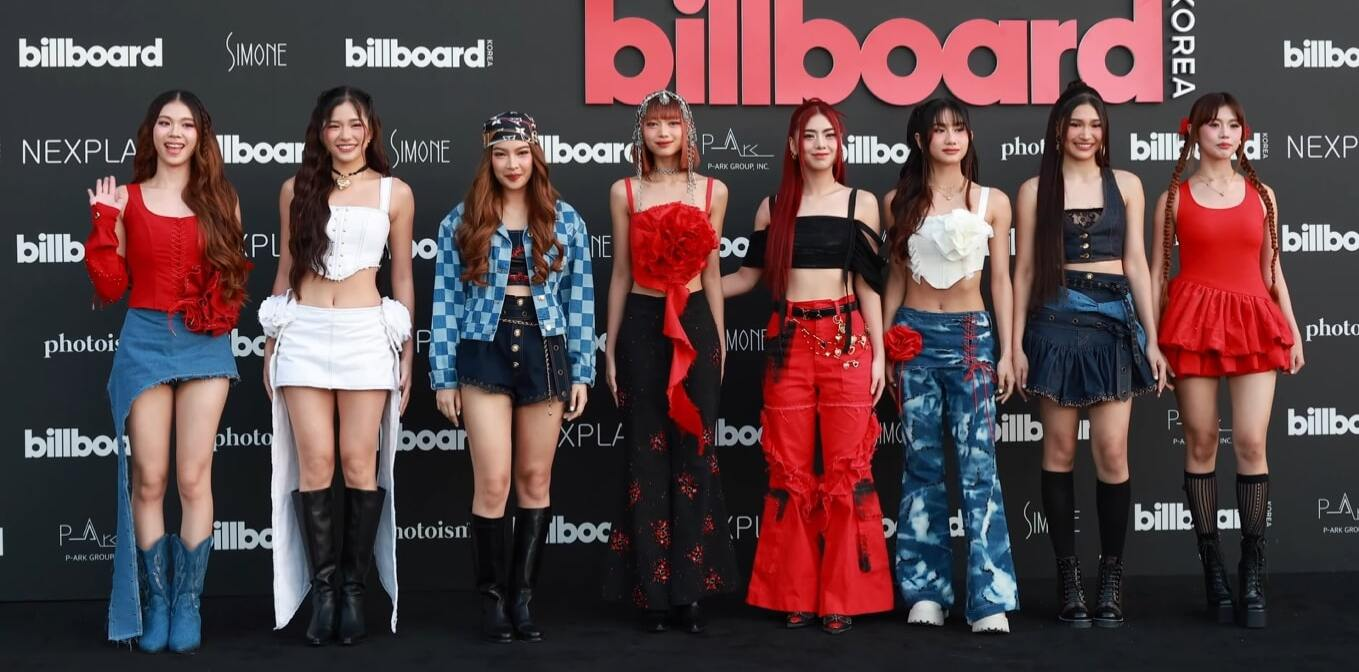
Behind-the-scenes footage of Bini and SB19 together was prominent in the music video for “Kabataang Pinoy” (2022).

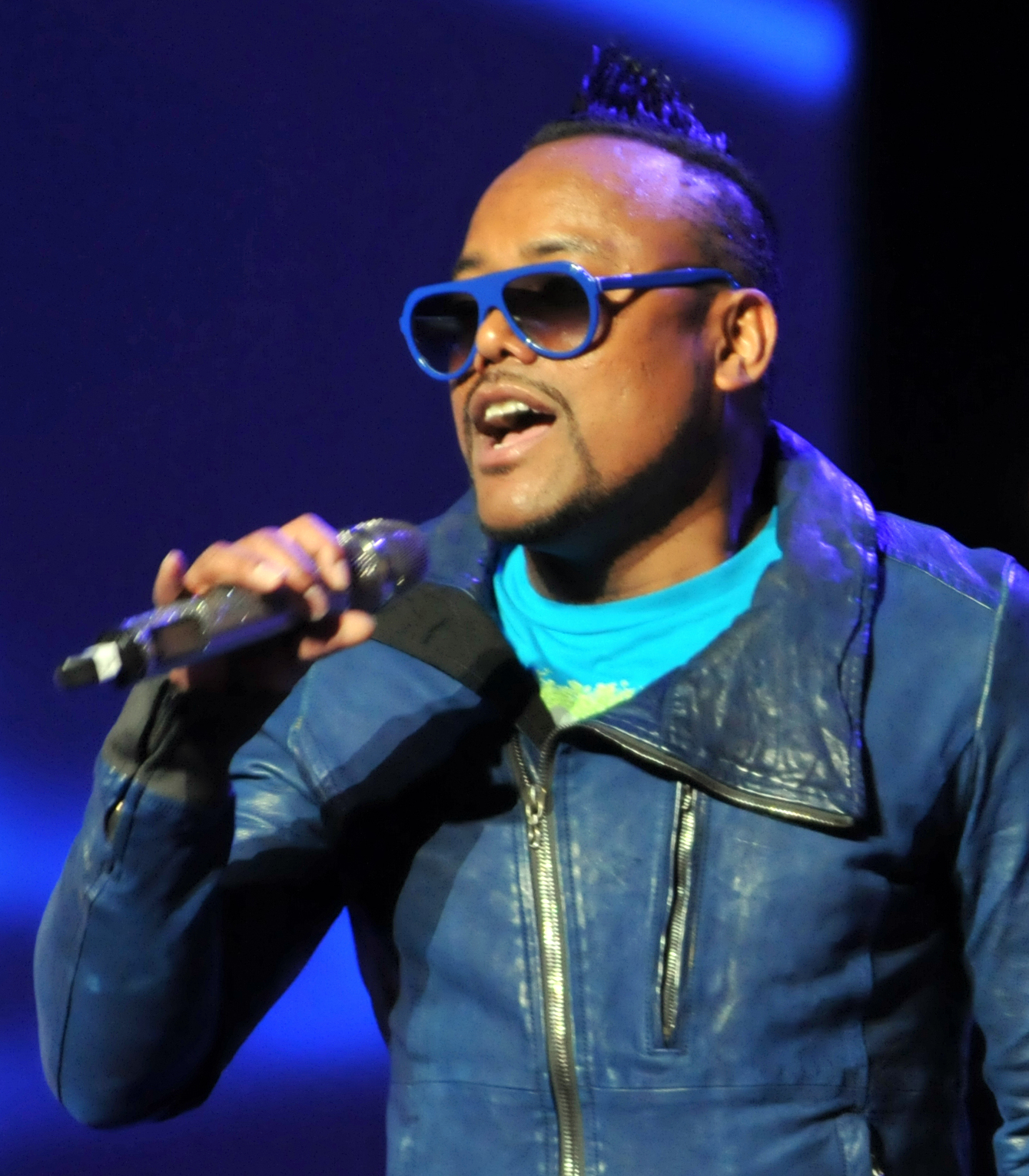
apl.de.ap of the Black Eyed Peas collaborated with SB19 for "Ready" (2024).

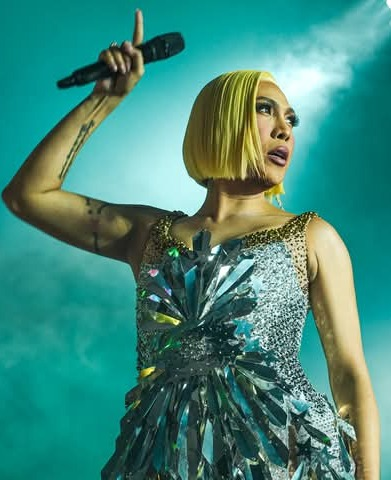
Vice Ganda appeared in the music video for "Dungka!" (2025).

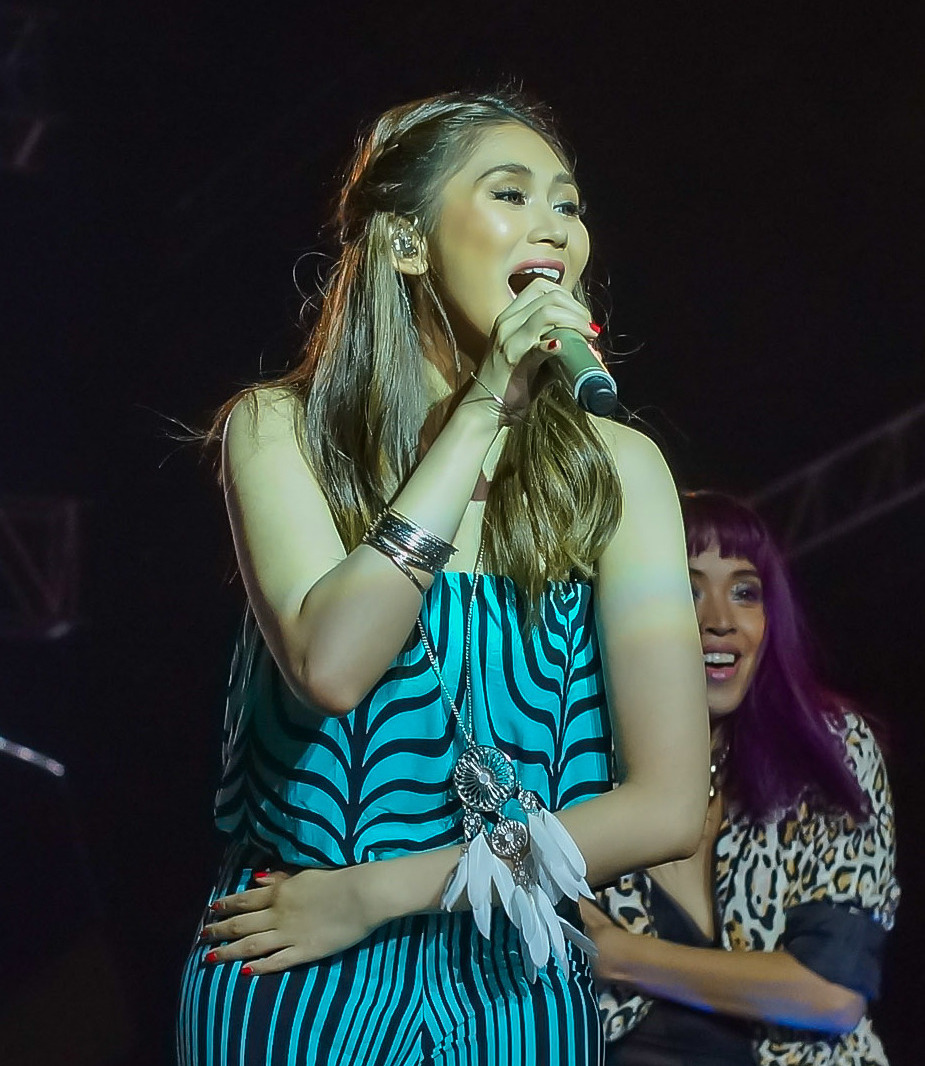
SB19 and Sarah Geronimo collaborated for "Umaaligid" (2025).

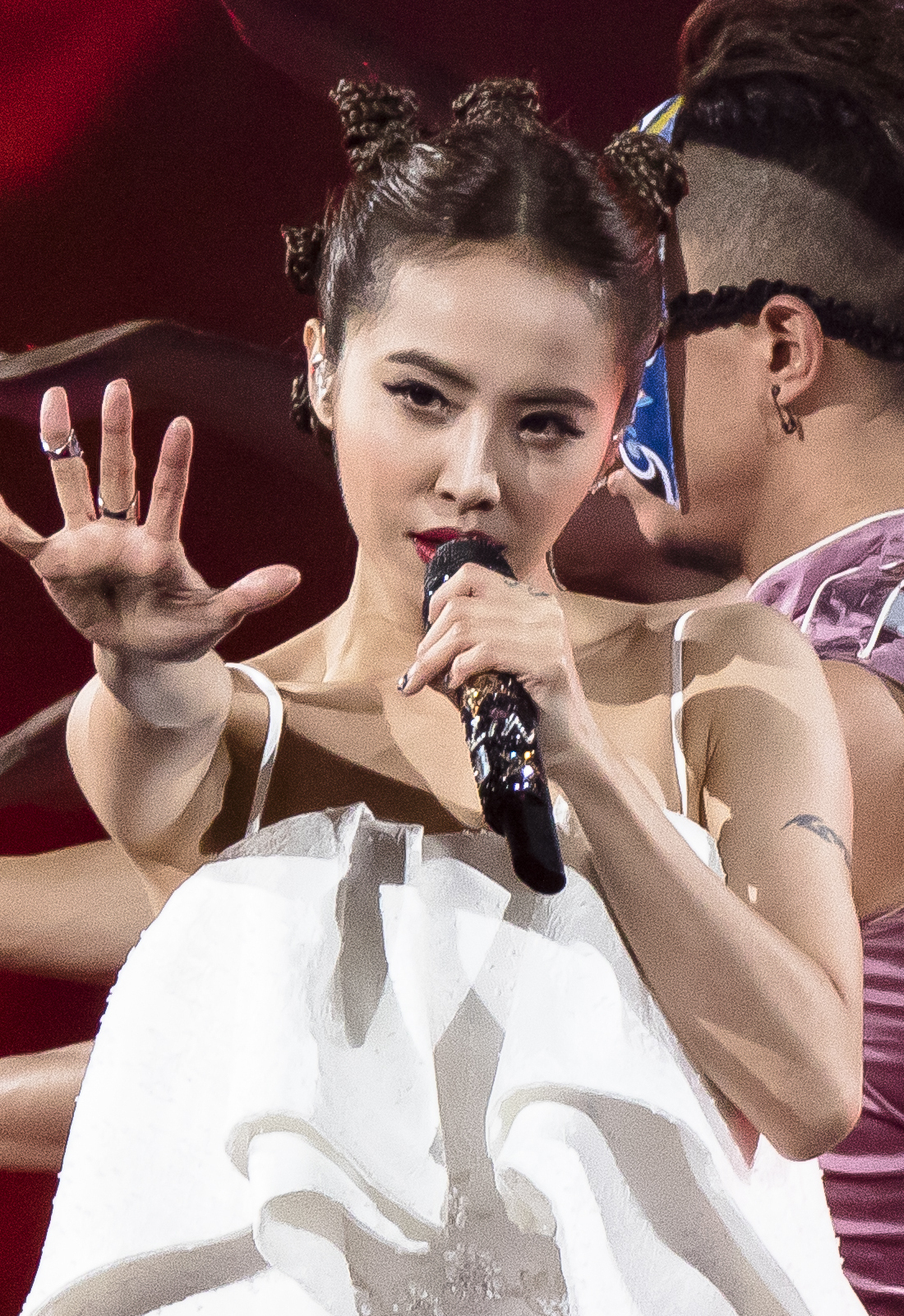
SB19 and Jolin Tsai appeared together in the music video for "Emoji" (2026).

List of music videos
Title	Year	Other performer(s)	Director(s)	Description	Ref(s).
"Tilaluha"	2018	None	Unknown	The video depicts the South Korean actors Park Se-eun and BNF's Harang attempting to move on from a failed relationship, with the song playing in the background. The video was shot in South Korea.	
"Go Up"	2019	None	JC Gellidon	The video depicts SB19 performing the song's choreography on the rooftop of a building. Other scenes show the group dancing in a studio and behind-the-scenes videos of the group working on the song.	
"Wag Mong Ikunot ang Iyong Noo"	2019	None	Unknown	The video showcases footage from SB19's live shows, including performances, rehearsals, audience, and behind-the-scenes videos.	
"Wag Mong Ikunot ang Iyong Noo" (One UP TV version)	2019	None	Unknown	The video showcases footage from SB19's live shows, including performances and audience videos.	
"Alab (Burning)"	2020	None	Julienne Gueco	The video depicts SB19 performing the song's fast-paced dance choreography against various backdrops.	
"Ikako"	2020	None	Unknown	It is a home-recorded video of SB19 performing the song in their homes.	
"Hanggang sa Huli"	2020	None	Justin de Dios	It is an animated video depicting stories of multiple individuals encountering and navigating through love and tragedy.	
"Hanggang sa Huli" (in Jeju version)	2021	None	SB19	The video depicts SB19 singing the song while navigating through Jeju Island, South Korea; places include fields of tall grass, petunia flowers, and orange trees, as well as parts of the island's coastline.	
"What?"	2021	None	Justin de Dios	It is a video set in a fictional post-apocalyptic war zone depicting SB19 fighting for freedom. It includes scenes of the group singing and dancing to the song wearing various outfits and features the Murillo–Velarde map of the Philippines, which supports the country's claims over the West Philippine Sea.	
"Mapa (Band Version)"	2021	Ben&Ben	Unknown	The video depicts SB19 and Ben&Ben performing the song on a stage in the Manila Metropolitan Theater in Manila.	
"Bazinga"	2021	None	Jonathan Tal Placido	It is a graffiti-filled video depicting SB19 playing a video game, in which their alter egos appear fighting enemies in an arena. Other scenes depict the group dancing to the song's choreography. The video includes Easter eggs referencing different stages in the group's career.	
"Ligaya"	2021	None	Rose Lope	It is a Christmas-themed video depicting SB19 performing the song on a set filled with festive lights, Christmas decorations, and snow.	
"No Stopping You"	2021	None	Jed Regala	It is a vertical video depicting SB19 singing along and dancing to the song, including shots of them holding a mobile phone to record themselves, performing the song on a social media platform, and a montage of their dance routine against various backdrops.	
"SLMT"	2021	None	Jvee Alcayaga	It is a summer-themed video depicting SB19 singing and dancing on a beach in El Nido, Palawan, with some scenes depicting the group swimming and playing in the ocean.	
"Kabataang Pinoy"	2022	Bini	Unknown	The video showcases footage of SB19 and Bini preparing for and performing on Pinoy Big Brother: Kumunity Season 10; it includes footage of their performance, rehearsals, and behind-the-scenes videos.	
"WYAT (Where You At)"	2022	None	Jireh Christian Bacasno	It is a retro style video depicting SB19 in the late 20th century, surrounded by common objects associated with the time, including leather jackets, arcade machines, and neon lights.	
"Gento"	2023	None	Kerbs Balagtas	It is a grungy-themed video that depicts SB19 searching and mining gold. Later parts of the video depict them dancing to the song's choreography in a large quarry.	
"I Want You"	2023	None	Jed Regala	It is a sultry video that depicts SB19 in seductive scenes, some shot underwater and some utilizing image projection and smoke elements.	
"Freedom"	2023	None	Jed Regala	The video depicts SB19 wandering in outdoor spaces.	
"Moonlight"	2024	Ian Asher; Terry Zhong	Kerbs Balagtas; Justin de Dios	It is a minimalistic video that depicts SB19 and their backup dancers wearing white button-up long-sleeves and light gray pants, dancing to the song's choreography.	
"Ready"	2024	apl.de.ap	Ben Mor	The video depicts SB19 alighting from their luxurious cars to attend a house party held in a mansion, after which it shows them with apl.de.ap carrying on with their party on a yacht.	
"Kalakal"	2024	Gloc-9	Alanshiii	The video depicts SB19 singing the song in a set filled with various objects and goods, including clothes and old television sets, with Gloc-9 later joining them after pushing a cart. The set is filled with references to the group members' solo careers.	
"Dam"	2025	None	Alanshiii	The video is Greek mythology-inspired and themed around dark medieval fantasy depicting SB19 as mythical creatures, who came together to save a tree of life by them morphing into stone.	
"Time"	2025	None	Karlo Calingao; Louis Anthony Duran	The video revolves around a synopsis of how short time is and how to make sense of cherishing meaningful moments with loved ones.	
"Dungka!"	2025	None	Kerbs Balagtas	The video depicts SB19 being allegiant to their community and participating in a battle rap. The video also shows references to Filipino culture, including street basketball, Zumba, Chinese garter, and karaoke. The video includes appearances of personalities Ghost Wrecker, Kween Yasmin, Malupiton, Smugglaz, Shehyee, Alodia Gosiengfiao, Mimiyuuuh, Pat Lasaten, Agnes Reoma, Maymay Entrata, Sassa Gurl, Jayat, and Vice Ganda. It was filmed on the streets of Metro Manila.	
"Umaaligid"	2025	Sarah Geronimo	Simon Te		
"Mapa (Indonesian Version)"	2025	Aruma	Raden Kaleng; Bernadus Raka		
"Visa"	2026	None	Alanshiii		
"Emoji"	2026	Jolin Tsai	Alanshiii; John Vladimir Manalo		
"Toyfriend"	2026	Be:First	Kerbs Balagtas		
"Together in Motion"	2026	None	Unknown		
"Firestarter"	2026	None	Alanshiii		

== Film ==
List of films
Title	Year	Notes	Ref(s).
Ex-Mas	2020	Short film; main roles	
Pagtatag! The Documentary	2024	Documentary; main roles	
Simula at Wakas: Kickoff Concert Film	2026	Concert film; main roles	
Wakas at Simula: The Trilogy Concert Finale in Cinemas	2026	Concert film; main roles	

== Television ==
List of television shows
Title	Year(s)	Network	Region	Notes	Ref(s).
Aja Aja Tayo	2018–2019	TV5	Philippines	Guest performers (Seasons 1–2)	
Unang Hirit	2019–2021	GMA	Philippines	Guest performers	
Letters and Music	2019–2020	Net 25	Philippines	Guest performers	
i-Witness	2019	GMA	Philippines	Documentary (Episode: "Pinoy K-pop")	
Umagang Kay Ganda	2019–2020	ABS-CBN	Philippines	Guest performers	
ASAP	2019–2023; 2025	ABS-CBN; Kapamilya	Philippines	Recurring performers	
Rated K	2019	ABS-CBN	Philippines	Guest performers and interviewees	
Tonight with Boy Abunda	2019–2020	ABS-CBN	Philippines	Guest performers and interviewees	
Studio 7	2019	GMA	Philippines	Guest performers	
Gandang Gabi, Vice!	2019	ABS-CBN	Philippines	Guest performers and interviewees	
Magandang Buhay	2019	ABS-CBN	Philippines	Guest performers and interviewees	
Daddy's Gurl	2019	GMA	Philippines	Guest roles	
Mars Pa More	2019	GMA	Philippines	Guest performers and interviewees	
The Clash	2019	GMA	Philippines	Guest performers (Season 2 Episode 21)	
I Can See Your Voice	2020; 2023	ABS-CBN; Kapamilya	Philippines	Contestants (Season 2 Episode 22; Season 5 Episode 21)	
Kapuso Mo, Jessica Soho	2020	GMA	Philippines	Guest performers	
Tonight with Arnold Clavio	2020	GMA News TV	Philippines	Guest performers and interviewees	
Myx Presents	2020	Myx	Philippines	Interviewees	
It's Showtime	2020; 2022; 2024–2026	ABS-CBN; Kapamilya	Philippines	Recurring performers	
Sunday Noontime Live!	2020	TV5	Philippines	Guest performers (Episode 1)	
Lazada Super Show	2020–2021	GMA	Philippines	Guest performers (Television specials)	(Note: Attributed to multiple references:)
Aja! Aja! Tayo sa Jeju	2021	Kapamilya	Philippines	Guest roles	
All-Out Sundays	2021; 2023–2026	GMA	Philippines	Recurring performers	
Lazada Epic 10th Birthday Super Party	2022	GMA	Philippines	Guest performers (Television special)	
Pinoy Big Brother	2022	Kapamilya	Philippines	Guest performers and houseguests (Season 10 Episodes 154; 194–197)	
Wowowin	2022	All TV	Philippines	Guest performers	
Eat Bulaga!	2022	GMA	Philippines	Guest performers	
Good Day New York	2022–2023	Fox	United States	Guest performers and interviewees	
K-pop Generation	2023	TVING	South Korea	Episode 4: "What the K?"	
Family Feud	2023	GMA	Philippines	Contestants	
KTLA 5 Morning News	2023	CW	United States	Guest performers and interviewees	
New York Living	2023	CW	United States	Guest performers and interviewees	
The Voice Generations	2023	GMA	Philippines	Guest performers (Episode 10)	
Fast Talk with Boy Abunda	2024	GMA	Philippines	Interviewees (Episodes 410–411)	
Atom Boyz II	2024	TVBS	Taiwan	Guest performers (Season 2 Episode 11)	
Dayday	2026	Nippon Television	Japan	Guest performers	

== Web ==
List of web/online shows
Title	Year(s)	Notes	Ref(s).
Show Break	2018–present	Main roles (Seasons 1–6)	
iWant ASAP	2019–2023; 2025	Guest performers and interviewees	
Kapuso ArtisTambayan	2019	Interviewees	
Showtime Online U	2020; 2022; 2024–2025	Guest performers and interviewees	
I Feel U	2020	Interviewees (Episode 9: "Sayaw ng Buhay")	
We Rise Together	2020	Interviewees	
Padayon: The NCCA Hour	2021	Guest performers and interviewees	
Our Zone: Anniversary Series	2021	Main roles	
School Buddies	2022	Main roles	

== Commercials ==
List of commercial advertisements
Year	Company or product	Promoting	Title	Theme song(s)	Region	Ref(s).
2020	Globe Telecom, Inc.	Cellular service: TM	"#NoExpiryAngFun sa TM FunSagad10!"	"Alab (Burning)"	Philippines	
2021	Lazada E-Services Philippines, Inc.	E-commerce: Lazada	"Lazada 3.3 Free Shipping Sale"	None	Philippines	
2021	Pepsi-Cola Products Philippines, Inc.	Carbonated soft drink: Pepsi	"Hit sa Sarap (Pepsi ft. Your Favorite Ulam)"	"Total Eclipse of the Heart"	Philippines	
2021	Pepsi-Cola Products Philippines, Inc.	Carbonated soft drink: Pepsi	"Hit sa Sarap (Pepsi ft. Spicy Dishes)"	"Total Eclipse of the Heart"; "Dynamite"	Philippines	
2021	Globe Telecom, Inc.	Cellular service: TM	"BigaTen ang ₱10 Mo sa TM FB10 & ML10!"	"TM FunPasko (Samahang Pina-Easy)"	Philippines	
2022	Monde Nissin Corporation	Instant noodles: Lucky Me! Jjamppong	"Lucky Me! Jjamppong Sarang-anghang Sarap"	None	Philippines	
2022	Pepsi-Cola Products Philippines, Inc.	Carbonated soft drink: Pepsi Blue	"Sarap Maging Pinoy with Pepsi Blue!"	None	Philippines	
2022	PPI Holdings, Inc.	Pizza restaurant chain: Pizza Hut	"Make It Great!"	"Go Up"	Philippines	
2022	Globe Fintech Innovations, Inc.	Mobile payments service: GCash Jr.	"Ready for Bigger Things!"	"Ready, Set, G!"	Philippines	
2022	Globe Fintech Innovations, Inc.	Mobile payments service: GCash Jr.	"Ready for Your First E-wallet!"	"Ready, Set, G!"	Philippines	
2022	Golden Donuts, Inc.	Doughnut company: Dunkin'	"Dunkin' PH SB19 Combo Craze"	None	Philippines	
2023	Pepsi-Cola Products Philippines, Inc.	Carbonated soft drink: Pepsi	"Iba ang Sarap with Pepsi!"	None	Philippines	
2023	Unilever RFM Ice Cream, Inc.	Ice cream: Selecta	"#MaPaSelectaMuna"	"Mapa"	Philippines	
2023	Pepsi-Cola Products Philippines, Inc.	Carbonated soft drink: Pepsi	"Bagong Pepsi!"	None	Philippines	
2024	Monde Nissin Corporation	Instant noodles: Lucky Me! Seafood Shrimp Tonkotsu	"Ito Na ang Seafood Ko!"	None	Philippines	
2024	Globe Fintech Innovations, Inc.	Mobile payments service: GCash	"Tara, Summer Na! I-GCash Mo!"	"Tara, Summer Na!"	Philippines	
2024	Golden Arches Development Corporation	Fast food restaurant: McDonald's	"Anong Atin? Chicken McDo!"	None	Philippines	
2024	Globe Telecom, Inc.	Cellular service: TM	"Siyambilibabol ang Streaming sa TM EasySurf50 5G!"	"TeaM Tayo"	Philippines	
2024	Globe Telecom, Inc.	Cellular service: TM	"Siyambilibabol ang TikTok Posts Mo sa TM EasySurf50 5G!"	"TeaM Tayo"	Philippines	
2024	Globe Fintech Innovations, Inc.	Mobile payments service: GCash	"Lahat ay Merry sa Merry GCash"	"We Wish You a Merry GCash"	Philippines	
2025	International Pharmaceuticals, Inc.	Soap: Bioderm	"Bioderm, May Tamang Cool na Para Sayo"	None	Philippines	
2025	Universal Robina Corporation	Chips: Mang Juan	"Huwow Omnibus"	None	Philippines	
2025	Golden Arches Development Corporation	Fast food restaurant: McDonald's	"Snaaaks! May New Black Pepper Burger McDo!"	None	Philippines	
2025	Golden Arches Development Corporation	Fast food restaurant: McDonald's	"Celebrate Every Win with Nori McShaker Fries!"	None	Philippines	
2025	Golden Arches Development Corporation	Fast food restaurant: McDonald's	"Snaaaks, Ganda Pa Rin ng Hair After Commute!"	None	Philippines	
2025	Globe Fintech Innovations, Inc.	Mobile payments service: GCash	"Make It Merry with GCash and SB19"	"Make It Merry, I-GCash Mo"	Philippines	
2026	CDO Foodsphere, Inc.	Hotdog: CDO Idol	"May Panalo Na para sa SB19, CDO Idol Hotdog!"	None	Philippines	
2026	Nutri-Asia, Inc.	Condiment: Datu Puti Adobo Series	"Kahit Anong Style Mo sa Adobo—Adobo Series Natin 'To!"	None	Philippines	
2026	Pepsi-Cola Products Philippines, Inc.	Carbonated soft drink: Pepsi Extra Fizz	"Pepsi Extra Fizz"	None	Philippines	
2026	Canva Solutions, Inc.	Software: Canva	"Kaya"	"Kaya"	Philippines	
