= Get in the Zone =

Studio album by SB19
- Released: July 31, 2020
- Recorded: 2018–2019
- Studio: RealBros Sound Studio (Korea); Curb Studio (Korea)
- Genre: Pop; EDM
- Length: 33:12
- Language: English; Tagalog
- Label: Sony Philippines
- Producer: Han Tae Soo; Oh Won Lee; Park Jung Un; Glow

SB19 chronology
Get in the Zone (2020)	Pagsibol (2021)

Singles from Get in the Zone
- 1. "Tilaluha" Released: October 26, 2018; 2. "Go Up" Released: July 26, 2019; 3. "Alab (Burning)" Released: December 25, 2019; 4. "Hanggang sa Huli" Released: July 31, 2020

Get in the Zone is the debut studio album by Filipino boy band SB19, released on July 31, 2020, by Sony Music Philippines. It contains six original compositions, an electronic remix, and two instrumentals.

== Background and development ==
In a press conference, ShowBT CEO Robin Geong discussed to inform the media for what's in store for SB19 in 2020. One of the events that was scheduled was the group's debut album release. The music production for SB19's first full album has come to completion and was originally planned to be released in March 2020. Most of the songs were written before the release of "Go Up", but due to the COVID-19 pandemic, they need to find time when to drop it.

The album is an incorporation of all the things that the group has experienced during their trainee days which they "put all the emotions that they went through into their music" and hoped that they got to inspire people with their story. Lyrically, the album speaks of the creative and personal journey of the group which reflected on the different emotions showed in the tracks—happiness, hopefulness, inspiration, sadness, and sorrow. The members of the group were involved in the process of making the album, collaborating with their producers in South Korea, through their agency ShowBT. Pablo was credited for writing the lyrics of all the tracks in the album.

We wanted to incorporate all the things that we have experienced during trainee days into this album by putting all the emotions that we went through into our music. It was an emotional rollercoaster, but we pulled through and we hope that we get to inspire people with our story.

— Pablo, Manila Bulletin

== Release and promotion ==
On July 19, 2020, SB19 uploaded a poster captioned "Coming" with an invitation envelope illustration. It was then concluded that the post was pertaining to the album release after the band posted the album release schedule. A day after, they held a Q&A activity in collaboration with Twitter to communicate with their fans to hype up the album. Teasers were uploaded from July 22, 2020, until July 27, 2020, and finally releasing the track list on July 29, 2020. Get in the Zone was release worldwide on July 31, 2020, through Sony Music as a digital album, with the band hosting an album release party broadcast on their YouTube channel. On October 9, 2020, they released an animated music video for the title track "Hanggang sa Huli" directed by the member Justin. The title track was performed mostly on the events they are guests of such as in the Awit Awards 2020 and Wish 1075 digital concert. On November 21, the band held their first ever global online concert hosted by Global Live in which they performed all the tracks in the album with additional new performances. On December 7, the physical copies of the album were released in a CD format to purchase through Lazada or Facebook in conjunction with the official launching of their online store.

== Singles ==
"Tilaluha" was released on October 26, 2018, as a debut single and also later re-released under their new record label on February 1, 2020. The music video was released one day earlier than the official release date on all major music platforms. Despite its least reception to the majority,

The second single, "Go Up", was originally released on July 19, 2019, under ShowBT Philippines with the music video dropped after 10 days. The song received lukewarm reception until they uploaded its dance practice on YouTube which was shared by fans on Twitter and Facebook. The video received positive feedbacks from people because of the group's synchronized dance moves which eventually became viral on social media. This happening made SB19 gained a rising popularity. Later on December, SB19 signed a contract with Sony Music Philippines to expand their reach into the market. With their new record label, two of their songs were re-released which includes "Go Up" on January 23, 2020. SB19 recorded a total of five entries on the Billboard charts after Next Big Sound, Emerging Artists, and Social 50.

The third single, "Alab (Burning)", was released on the day of Christmas, December 25, 2019, as the first official single under the group's new record label Sony Music Philippines, Inc. SB19 announced the new single after selling out their first major concert on Cuneta Astrodome. The track was produced by Han Tae Soo which entails about finding true love and doing whatever it takes to win that person over. A lyric video was uploaded on their YouTube channel a day after, and finally drops the music video on January 10, 2020.

The album's title track, "Hanggang sa Huli", served as the fourth official single off Get in the Zone. It received the most promotion across shows, guesting, and concerts. On October 1, 2020, SB19 announced the date of the premiere of its official music video through a release date teaser and schedule. The music video, directed & written by the group's member Justin and animated by Julian Bacani (JuJuArts), was premiered on October 9, 2020, on their YouTube channel.

== Track listing ==
Get in the Zone track listing
No.	Title	Writer(s)	Producer(s)	Length
1.	"Alab (Burning)"	John Paulo Nase; Han Tae Soo	Han Tae Soo	3:02
2.	"Go Up"	Nase; Oh Won Lee; Glow	Oh Won Lee; Glow	3:09
3.	"Tilaluha"	Nase; Kim Kyeong Su; Geong Seong Han	Geong	3:57
4.	"Love Goes"	Nase; Kim; Geong	Soo	3:42
5.	"Hanggang sa Huli"	Nase; Geong	Geong; Park Jung Un	4:14
6.	"Wag Mong Ikunot ang Iyong Noo"	Nase; Choi Chang Eon	Geong	3:22
7.	"Love Goes" (EDM version)	Nase; Geong	Geong	3:35
8.	"Tilaluha" (instrumental)	Nase; Su; Geong	Geong	3:57
9.	"Hanggang sa Huli" (instrumental)	Nase; Soo	Geong; Park	4:14
Total length:				33:12

Notes

- "Hanggang sa Huli" and "Wag Mong Ikunot ang Iyong Noo" are stylized in capital case.

== Credits and personnel ==
- Marvin Fabular – recording (track 4, 7)
- Geong Seong Han – executive producer, composer (track 3, 4)
- Lee Kyeong Ho – recording (track 4, 7)
- Ha Yong Ji – chorus (track 2)
- Josh Cullen Santos – rap (track 1, 2, 4, 7), vocals (track 2)
- Jo Sung Jun – guitar (track 5)
- Justin De Dios – rap (track 4, 7), vocals
- Felip Jhon Suson – vocals, rap
- Ju Hyeong Lee – piano (track 2)
- Oh Won Lee – bass (track 2)
- Won Sang Lee – guitar (track 2)
- Anne Patricia Rubinas – recording (track 4, 7)
- John Paulo Nase – rap, vocals, songwriting
- Han Tae Soo – synth and chorus (track 1, 5), recording, editing, mixing, arrangement
- Stellvester Ajero – vocals
- Kim Kyeong Su – recording (track 4, 7)
- Park Jung Un – mastering (track 1, 5, 9)
- Lee Woong – arrangement (track 3)

== Release history ==
Release history and formats for Get in the Zone
Region	Date	Format	Label	Ref
Various	July 31, 2020	Digital download; streaming	Sony Music	
Philippines	December 7, 2020	CD	Sony Music Philippines	
