= 4Sisters =

Filipino girl group

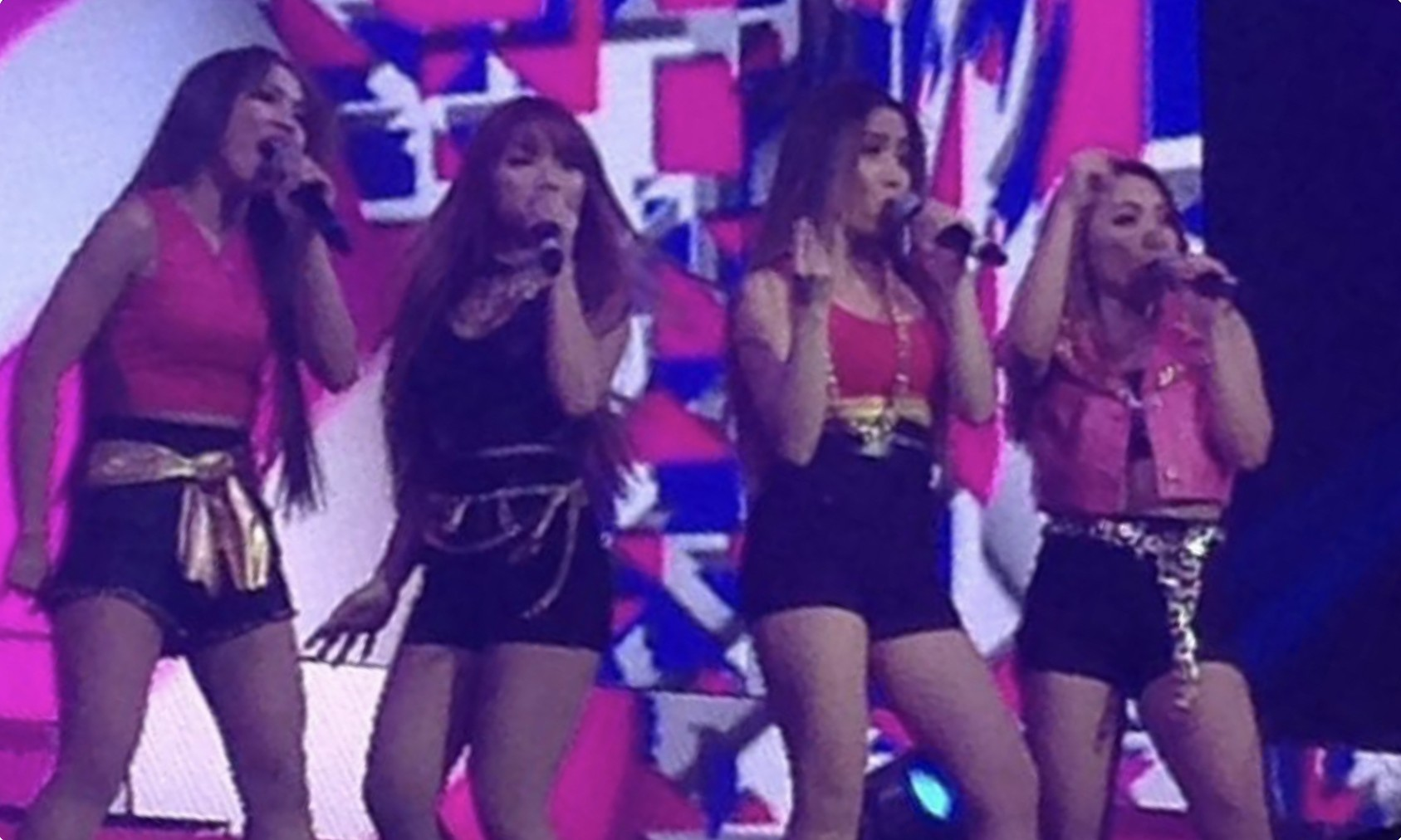
- 4Sisters performing in 2016

Background information
- Also known as: The Cercado Sisters; The Cercados; The Gollayan Sisters; MICA; 4th Power
- Origin: Manila, Philippines
- Genres: P-pop; dance-pop; R&B
- Years active: 2001–present
- Labels: ShowBT Entertainment; Sony Music Philippines; Star Music; Saturno Music; Viva Records
- Members: Almira; Irene; Mylene; Celina

4Sisters (stylized in all caps; formerly known as 4th Impact) is a Filipino girl group composed of sisters Almira, Irene, Mylene and Celina Cercado. The group competed in the twelfth season of the British singing contest The X Factor, where they were the ninth contestant eliminated. They are also known for having participated in several Philippine and international talent competitions, including the World Championships of Performing Arts, which they won in 2006 and 2013, and the South Korean talent search Superstar K6 in 2014, where they reached eighth place. The sisters are originally from Roxas, Isabela, and are now based in Metro Manila.

== Career ==
=== 2001–2014: Early years ===
Almira, the eldest of the sisters in the group, first began competing at a young age in Filipino talent shows such as Batang Kampeon, which was won by Charice Pempengco, and Star for a Night, which was won by Sarah Geronimo.

The group was formed in 2001 at the suggestion of an aunt. Initially, they named themselves 'The Cercado Sisters' after their surname and began performing and competing as a girl group at festivals, events and talent shows in Roxas, Isabela. In 2006, they were approached by one of the producers of the talent show FamJam, who asked them if they would like to represent the Philippines in the World Championships of Performing Arts. They elected to join and eventually won 16 gold medals and four outstanding plaques and were proclaimed Junior Vocal Group Grand Champion of the competition. The following year, the group was invited to perform in the 2007 Monaco Charity Film Festival. In 2008, the group released a six-track self-titled EP under Viva Records, which did not reach commercial success. In 2009, they also began using the name 'The Gollayan Sisters', which was derived from their middle name. They continued to compete in various singing contests and in 2012 participated as members of a family troupe that won in the Filipino variety show It's Showtime, singing covers of "I Believe I Can Fly" and "Queen of the Night". Early in 2013, the group landed a regular gig in the musical variety show Sarah G Live as backup singers and dancers. Later that same year, the group competed and won again in the World Championships of Performing Arts, this time as the Grand Winner in the Senior Vocal Group Category, bringing home 20 gold medals, four silver medals and four overall champion plaques. In April 2014, the group released their album The Cercados: Unstoppable! under Saturno Music, which also failed to reach commercial success.

Early appearances
Year	Production	Performed as	Result
2004	FamJam	The Cercado Sisters	3rd place
2006	World Championships of Performing Arts	The Cercado Sisters	Grand Champion - Junior Vocal Group
2007	Monaco Charity Film Festival	The Cercado Sisters	N/A (guest performer)
2008	Pinoy Idol	Cercado Sisters (as individuals)	Eliminated in 1st round
2009	World Championship of Performing Arts	The Cercado Sisters	N/A (guest performer)
2011	Talentadong Pinoy	The Cercado Sisters	Weekly Champions
2011	Protégé	The Cercado Sisters	Eliminated in knockout rounds
2012	It's Showtime	The Gollayan Sisters (as part of the Gollayan Family)	Champion
2012	KPop Star Hunt (Season 2)	Cercado Sisters (as individuals)	Eliminated in knockout rounds
2013	World Championships of Performing Arts	The Gollayan Sisters	Grand Champion - Senior Vocal Group

=== 2014: Superstar K ===
In August 2014, the group traveled to South Korea to audition in the talent competition Superstar K6. The competition organizers asked if they could change their group name to something more easily remembered and pronounced, which caused their name to be changed to 'MICA', an acronym formed from the first letters of their names. Their performance impressed the judges and the group moved on to the next round, where they performed their rendition of Idina Menzel's song "Let It Go" from the Disney movie Frozen. Their performance went viral on social media and YouTube, quickly garnering over 20 million views in a short period of time. After competing in the knock-out stages of the show, MICA was eliminated in the second round of "Super Week". The judges, however, decided to bring them back as a wildcard act, and the group, along with 10 other acts, progressed to the live show stage of the competition. At that point, they were the only non-native Korean-speaking contestants remaining on the show. The group was eliminated in Week 3 of the competition, finishing in eighth place.

Superstar K6 performances and results
Episode	Theme	Song choice	Original artist	Result
First Audition	Contestant's Choice	—N/a		Advanced
Second Audition	Contestant's Choice	"U&I"	Ailee	Advanced
Second Audition	Contestant's Choice	"Listen"	Beyoncé	Advanced
Third Audition	Contestant's Choice	"Let It Go"	Idina Menzel	Advanced
Super Week, Part 1	Solo Performance	"Missing You"	2NE1	Advanced
Super Week, Part 2	Group Performance	"I'll Be There" (with Kim Hyeon Mi)	The Jackson Five	Eliminated
Super Week, Part 3	Wildcard Round	"Heaven"	Ailee	Advanced
Live Show 1	Top 11	"Maria"	Kim Ah Joong	Safe
Live Show 2	Top 9	"Fate" / "Destiny"	Lee Sun Hee	Safe
Live Show 3	Top 8	"I Know"	Seo Taiji	Eliminated

=== 2015: The X Factor ===
After their experience in Superstar K6, the group was planning to abandon their singing career until a fan from the United Kingdom suggested auditioning for the British singing contest The X Factor. The group decided to submit an online application for the aforementioned reality TV competition, and, after a few months, received an invitation to audition for the show. In July 2015, the sisters traveled to London, and after going through several screening tryouts, eventually made it to the arena auditions for the 12th season of The X Factor. Because there was already a current British artist named MICA, they introduced themselves as 4th Power and performed "Bang Bang" by Jessie J, Ariana Grande and Nicki Minaj as their audition piece. Their performance received a standing ovation from the audience and all four judges, with Simon Cowell saying, "In terms of first auditions, this is probably one of the best I've ever seen." After its airing, the group's audition went viral on YouTube and Facebook; and, as of June 2022, their YouTube audition video has garnered over 185 million views and is currently the most watched video in the show's history while the same video in Facebook has over 366 million views. The group sailed through the "Boot Camp" rounds of the show, where they performed "Proud Mary" by Tina Turner and "Titanium" by David Guetta, and the "Six-Chair Challenge" round where they performed "Show Me How You Burlesque" by Christina Aguilera. There, the mentor for group acts, Cheryl Fernandez-Versini, selected them as one of her final six acts. At this time, copyright issues were raised regarding their use of the name 4th Power, forcing the group to re-brand themselves again as 4th Impact. They then progressed to the "Judge's Houses" round, where they sang "Love the Way You Lie (Part II)" by Rihanna ft Eminem and were selected to move on to the live shows.

In the show's quarter-final, the group ended up ranking in the bottom two of the contestants remaining. Being one of the two acts who received the fewest public votes, they had to perform against fellow contestant Lauren Murray for the last slot in the semi-final. For the sing-off, the group performed Jennifer Hudson's rendition of "And I Am Telling You I'm Not Going" by Jennifer Holliday. Show judges Rita Ora and Nick Grimshaw voted to send Murray through to the semi-final while Cheryl Fernandez-Versini and Simon Cowell voted to send 4th Impact through to the semi-final. The result went into a deadlock and Lauren Murray, who had more public votes compared to 4th Impact, advanced to the semi-final which meant the group been the twelfth contestant eliminated. .

The X Factor performances and results
Episode	Theme	Song choice	Original artist	Result
Audition	Own choice	"Bang Bang"	Jessie J, Ariana Grande and Nicki Minaj	Advanced
Bootcamp stage 1	Group performance	"Proud Mary"	Tina Turner	Advanced
Bootcamp stage 2	Own choice	"Titanium"	David Guetta featuring Sia	Advanced
Six-chair challenge	Own choice	"Show Me How You Burlesque"	Christina Aguilera	Advanced
Judges' houses	Own choice	"Love the Way You Lie"	Rihanna featuring Eminem	Advanced
Live show 1	This Is Me	"Problem"	Ariana Grande featuring Iggy Azalea	Safe (2nd)
Live show 2	Reinvention	"Sound of the Underground" / "The Clapping Song"	Girls Aloud / Lincoln Chase	Safe (5th)
Live show 3	Movie week	"Work It Out"	Beyoncé	Safe (4th)
Live show 4	Love and heartbreak	"Ain't No Other Man"	Christina Aguilera	Safe (4th)
Quarter-Final	Jukebox	"I'll Be There"	The Jackson 5	Bottom two (5th)
Quarter-Final	Judges' choice	"Fancy" / "Rich Girl"	Iggy Azalea featuring Charli XCX / Gwen Stefani featuring Eve	Bottom two (5th)
Live show 5 Results	Sing-off	"And I Am Telling You I'm Not Going"	Jennifer Holliday	Eliminated (fifth place)

=== 2016–2019: The X Factor Live Tour and singles ===
After their elimination from the X Factor UK, 4th Impact received numerous offers to perform throughout the United Kingdom and in other countries. They appeared in several shows, venues and events in London and nearby cities. In early 2016, the group traveled on their first official tour, The X Factor Live Tour, co-headlining with Louisa Johnson, Reggie 'n' Bollie, Che Chesterman, Lauren Murray, Anton Stephans, Mason Noise and Seann Miley Moore. Polls conducted by the show's producers prior to the tour showed 4th Impact as the most anticipated act in the tour's lineup. A poll conducted after the tour named 4th Impact as the best act of the show.

After the X Factor Live Tour, 4th Impact continued to perform in the UK and internationally, particularly in Dubai; UAE; Dublin, Ireland; Oslo, Norway; and Gibraltar. In April 2016, 4th Impact returned to the Philippines to perform in the 1st Paradise International Music Festival, alongside Kanye West, Wiz Kalifa and other international and Filipino artists. Later that same year, the group announced their homecoming concert to the Philippines entitled Invas10n, which also commemorated their tenth year as group. In December 2016, 4th Impact launched their Invas10n Tour, with their first major concert held in the Philippines. They also traveled back to Dubai that same month for a repeat performance of their concert held in the city earlier that year.

The group, with Star Music Philippines' backing, released their original debut single entitled "Unleash The Diva" in January 2017. The song peaked at number 3 in iTunes PH and number 1 at Spotify's Viral 50 PH.

In March 2017, 4th Impact traveled to Doha, Qatar to perform in a one-night-only concert. Shortly after, they announced the first international leg of their Invas10n Tour, to be held in New Zealand and Australia in August 2017.

In August 2017, 4th Impact officially announced that their first album is in the works and is being recorded under Star Music. Later that same month, the group went on their international Invas10n tour in Auckland, New Zealand and Melbourne and Sydney, Australia.

In November 2017, 4th Impact announced that they signed with US-based Granda Entertainment and We R 1 Music Group and were in the process of recording an EP of original music.

In early January 2018, 4th Impact announced that they had recorded the official theme song for the Star Cinema movie 'Ang Dalawang Mrs. Reyes' entitled "It's Not The Same Anymore".

On March 21, 2018, Tony Valor, a US-based music artist, announced the international release of his single, "D' Nah Nah", recorded in collaboration with 4th Impact.

On August 26, 2018, 4th Impact performed as the opening act for Boyzone in Manila (Farewell Tour) held at the Smart Araneta Coliseum.

On March 10, 2019, 4th Impact performed as the opening act for Rita Ora's Phoenix World Tour held at the New Frontier Theater.

In December 2019, the group announced that they would be performing at the 24th Asian Television Awards which was to be held in the Philippines for the first time at the Newport Performing Arts Theater at the Resorts World Manila.

=== 2020–2021: COVID-19 pandemic and Philippine lockdown ===
The COVID-19 pandemic caught 4th Impact in the midst of their preparations to release their new original music. As the Philippines entered a country-wide lockdown, now considered to be one of the strictest quarantine protocols implemented in the world, the group struggled but eventually managed to release their first single since going independent, K(No)w More, toward the end of March 2020. However the group could not promote their work properly given that they could not leave their home and was only able to connect with their audience via digital and social media platforms. Faced with the prospect of dwindling chances to perform live gigs and appearances, the group moved into the digital space and started streaming live performances and fan interactions in Kumu, a Filipino-based livestreaming platform.

4th Impact managed to thrive in the livestreaming space so much so that they were recognized as Celebrity of the Year in the 2020 Kumu Livestreaming Awards. They also released music video-esque song and dance covers on their Youtube channel to maintain fan and audience engagement. In August 2020, the group produced and streamed their online digital concert entitled Dream5, in celebration of the 5th anniversary of 4th Impact. They also produced and streamed a Christmas special online concert in December 2020.

In February 2021, the group opened their own studio where they planned to practice, rehearse, produce and perform their own content. They also envisioned that their studio would someday be a platform where they can help introduce new Filipino artists.

In October 2021, 4th Impact announced that they have signed with ShowBT Philippines and will be coming out with new original music soon.

=== 2022–present: Comeback ===
Early in 2022, 4th Impact revealed that they have begun recording their newest single, which they announced to be as a comeback track. In March 2022, the group started to slowly tease details of their comeback, beginning with the announcement of a new group logo and the release of a fashion teaser video. This was followed by an announcement that their new comeback song will be released on March 25, 2022. The group also revealed that they will be participating and performing at the 2022 PPOP Conference and Concert to be held on April 9–10, 2022, at the Araneta City.

4th Impact released their comeback single, Here We Go, on March 25, 2022, as part of a single album which includes the song, K(No)w More.

Toward the end of June 2022, the group announced that they will be releasing a new single on July 22, 2022. Consequently, the group released their second comeback single, Tapat Sa'yo, on said date through the major digital music platforms, their YouTube channel and a fan event music showcase.

They achieved a first in their music career by being chosen to represent the Philippines at the Asia Song Festival (ASF) 2022 held in Seoul, South Korea on October 14, 2022. They performed their two original songs, Here We Go and Tapat Sa'yo. They were also given the honor of performing the K-POP song, Dynamite (BTS cover), by the ASF 2022 organizers.

4th Impact announced the release of their debut US single, DISTORTED, in September 2023. The new single dropped on October 8, 2023. This was followed by the single ALL AT ONCE on 28 November 2023. On 21 January 2024, 4th Impact released their self-titled EP 4TH IMPACT, including both singles.

In August 2025, 4TH Impact celebrated their 10-year anniversary with the release of a new single I Bet You Never. 4th Impact released a cover of the song Golden from the movie KPop Demon Hunters on 19 August 2025.

== Members ==
- Almira
- Irene
- Mylene
- Celina

== Discography ==
=== Albums ===
Title	Album details
The Cercado Sisters: Unstoppable!	Released: April 1, 2014; Format: Compact Disk and Digital Download; Label: Saturno Music
Here We Go (Single Album)	Released March 25, 2022; Format: Compact Disk and Digital Download; Label: Sony Music Philippines

=== Extended plays ===
Title	EP details
The Cercado Sisters	Released: September 1, 2008; Format: Compact Disc and Digital Download; Label: Viva Records
4th Impact	Released: January 11, 2024

=== Singles ===
==== As lead artist ====
Song	Year	Album
My All (명콤비 Twinz ft MICA)	2015	Non-album singles
Unleash the Diva	2017	Non-album singles
It's Not The Same Anymore (theme song in the 2018 film Ang Dalawang Mrs. Reyes)	2018	Non-album singles
D' Nah Nah (Shaky Bum Bum) (Tony Valor ft 4th Impact)	2018	Non-album singles
Take My Breath Away	2019	Non-album singles
K(No)w More	2020	Non-album singles
Dance With Me	2020	Non-album singles
K(No)w More [Dance Remix]	2021	Non-album singles
Here We Go	2022	Non-album singles
Tapat Sa'yo	2022	Non-album singles
Distorted	2023	Non-album singles
All At Once	2023	Non-album singles
I Bet You Never	2025	Non-album singles
Golden	2025	

==== As featured artist ====
Title	Year	Album
"D' Nah Nah" (with Tony Valor)	2018	Non-album single
"Celebrate Love" (with Irene Cercado)	2019	Non-album single
"Take My Breath Away" (Original R & B Version)	2019	Non-album single
"Halo Halo" (with Almira Cercado)	2019	Non-album single
"Bakit Ikaw Pa Rin" (Irene Cercado solo)	2021	Non-album single

== Filmography ==
Television
Year	Title	Role	Notes
2005	Fam Jam	Contestant	Season 1
2008	Pinoy Idol	Contestant	"Auditions: Metro Manila" (Season 1, episode 4)
2009	World Championships of Performing Arts	Guest Performer	Season 10
2011	Talentadong Pinoy	Contestant	Season 2
2011	Protégé: The Battle for the Big Break	Contestant	"Auditions" (Season 1, episode 3)
2012	It's Showtime	Contestant	Season 1
2012	KPop Star Hunt	Contestants (as individuals)	Season 2 (Episode 5)
2013	World Championships of Performing Arts	Contestant	Season 11
2014	Superstar K	Contestant	Season 6
2015	The X Factor	Contestant	Season 12
2016	The Xtra Factor Live	Co-headliner	Season 13
2016	Miss Earth	Guest Performer	Miss Earth 2016
2016	ASOP Music Festival Grand Finals Night	Guest Performer	ASOP Music Festival Year 5
2017	2017 Myx Music Awards	Guest Performer	Season 12
2019	Lazada Mid-year Festival 2019	Guest Performer	Lazada Mid-year Festival 2019
2019	24th Asian TV Awards	Guest Performer	Asian TV Awards
2020	4th Impact Dream5 Concert	Headliner	4th Impact 5th Anniversary Concert
2020	Shopee 10.10 Play & Win TV Special Live	Guest Performer	Shopee 10.10 2020
2020	4th Impact Christmas Digital Concert	Headliner	4th Impact Christmas Special 2020
2021	Lazada's 9th Birthday Celebration	Guest Performer	Lazada's 9th Birthday
2021	Back in the Zone	Guest Performer	SB19's Back in the Zone
2021	Forte: A Pop Orchestra Concert	Co-headliner	Sr. Baptista Battig Music Foundation Benefit Event
2021	Philippines-Korea Cultural Exchange Festival	Guest Performer	Philippines-Korea Cultural Exchange
2022	2022 PPOPCon Concert	Co-headliner	2022 PPOP Conference and Concert
2022	Binibining Pilipinas (Press Presentation)	Guest Performer	Binibining Pilipinas 2022
2022	Binibining Pilipinas (National Costume Fashion Show)	Guest Performer	Binibining Pilipinas 2022
2023	Drag Race Philippines	Guest judges	Season 2 episodes 1 and 2

== Concert tours ==
=== Headlining ===
- 4th Impact Live in Dubai (2016)
- 4th Impact Invas10n (Philippines) (2016)
- 4th Impact Live - The Comeback (Dubai) (2016)
- 4th Impact Live in Doha (2017)
- 4th Impact Invas10n World Tour (2017) (Auckland, New Zealand; Melbourne & Sydney, Australia)
- 4th Impact Rise Up (Philippines) (2018)
- Tapat Sa'yo Music Showcase and Fan Gathering (Philippines) (2022)

=== Co-headlining ===
- The X Factor Live Tour (with The X Factor finalists) (2016)
- 1st Paradise International Music Festival (2016)
- Powerhouse (with Arnel Pineda) (2016)
- PPOPCON Concert (2022)

=== Front Act/Featured Artist ===
- The Dream (Maymay Entrata Concert) (2018)
- Boyzone Farewell Concert in Manila (2018)
- Rita Ora in Manila (2019)
- 4th Impact at the Museumsuferfest (2019)
- 2019 SEA Games Gala Night (2019)
- 24th Asian TV Awards (2019)
- SB19 WYAT Concert (Clark) (2022)
- 2022 Asia Song Festival and Culture Bridge (2022)

== Awards and recognition ==
Year	Award	Nominee/Work	Category	Result	Ref
2016	Jollibee 'Yumbassador'	4th Impact	Jollibee 'Yumbassador' (Ambassador)	Won	
2016	UK - BAME (Black Asian Minority Ethnic)	4th Impact	Beam Award for Music Artist/Band of the Year	Nominated	
2016	National Reality TV Awards	4th Impact (in The X Factor UK)	Best Performance on a Reality TV Show	Nominated	
2016	29th Awit Awards	4th Impact	International Achievement Award	Won	
2017	2nd WISH 107.5 Music Awards	"Love The Way You Lie"	Best WISHCLUSIVE Performance by a Group or a Duo	Won	
2017	Aliw Awards 2017	Unleash/Kia Theater	Best Major Concert (Group)	Nominated	
2018	Fandom Battles 2018	Dreamers	Fandom Battle (Dreamers)	Nominated	
2018	Rawr Awards 2018	4th Impact	Favorite Group	Nominated	
2018	Aliw Awards 2018	INVAS10N/Kia Theater	Best Major Concert (Group)	Won	
2019	PPOP Awards	4th Impact	PPop Girl Group of the Year	Nominated	
2020	PPOP Awards	4th Impact	Pop Performing Group of the Year	Nominated	
2020	KUMU Special Awards	4th Impact	Celebrity Of The Year	Won	
2022	PPOP Awards	4th Impact	PPop Girl Group of the Year	Won	
2022	PPOP Awards	Almira	Pop Girl Vocal of the Year	Won	
2022	ASEAN Excellence Achievers Awards	4th Impact	Best Female Group Performer of the Year	Won	
2022	TikTok Awards Philippines	4th Impact	PPop Group of the Year	Nominated	
2022	The Global Iconic Aces Awards	4th Impact	Iconic Filipino Girl Group Performer Aces	Won	
2025	Dabeme Music Awards	4th Impact	Group/Band of the Year	Won	
