= Tilaluha =

Single by SB19
- Language: Tagalog
- Released: October 26, 2018
- Length: 3:57
- Label: ShowBT Philippines
- Composers: Geong Seong Han (Note: Geong Seong Han is also romanized and spelled as Jung Sung-han.); Kim Kyeong Su
- Lyricist: John Paulo Nase
- Producers: Geong Seong Han; Han Tae Soo

SB19 singles chronology
"Tilaluha" (2018)	"Go Up" (2019)

Music video
- "Tilaluha" on YouTube

"Tilaluha" (Note: The song's title, "Tilaluha", is a portmanteau of the Tagalog words "tila" (lit. 'stop raining') and "luha" (lit. 'tears'), which altogether suggests "stop crying". Some refer to the song's title as literally translating to "tearful".) is the debut single by the Filipino boy band SB19. Geong Seong Han, Kim Kyeong Su, and Sejun (now Pablo) wrote the song, and Geong produced it with Han Tae Soo. The song was released independently as a single on October 26, 2018, by ShowBT Philippines, the boy band's talent agency at the time. It is a ballad complete with drums and a string section, with lyrics that reference unrequited love and a breakup and express the want to escape from the sorrow the person has gone through.

Upon release, "Tilaluha" received a weak reception and saw little success, which led the band to consider disbandment. Nevertheless, they later achieved mainstream success with the release of their follow-up single, "Go Up" (2019). In retrospective reviews, the song received mixed responses from music critics, who praised SB19's vocals, the production, and the lyrical content, but found other aspects of the song unremarkable. The group performed the song multiple times, including in several concert set lists such as WYAT (Where You At) Tour (2022) and Pagtatag! World Tour (2023–2024). Initially a standalone single, it was later included on their debut studio album, Get in the Zone (2020).

== Background and release ==
The Korean Wave became a prevalent cultural phenomenon in the Philippines, which led to K-pop also increasing in popularity in the country, receiving substantial fanfare. However, local-based pop groups remained unpopular. The South Korean comedian Geong Seong Han sought to localize K-pop and Korean culture in other Asian markets, finding the Philippines among the appropriate countries to establish such. This led him to establish talent agency ShowBT Philippines. The talent agency began searching for local talents in 2016 who will undergo similar training procedures as K-pop idols before debuting as a boy band, narrowing down three hundred auditionees. The talent agency ended up with five members composed of Ken, Josh, Justin, Sejun (now Pablo), and Stell, which all debuted as SB19, who would initially perform at company events organized by ShowBT.

After about two years of training, ShowBT Philippines released "Tilaluha" independently as SB19's debut single on October 26, 2018, with an accompanying music video released the same day on YouTube. The music video was filmed in South Korea, which starred South Korean personalities Park Se Eun and BNF's Harang. In late 2019, the boy band signed a recording contract with Sony Music Philippines, and in 2020, the label re-released the group's earlier works under their new management; they re-released "Tilaluha" on February 1. SB19 later included the song in their debut studio album, Get in the Zone, released on July 31, 2020.

== Composition and lyrics ==
"Tilaluha" is 3 minutes and 57 seconds in length. The song was composed by Geong and Kim Kyeong Su, with lyrics written by Sejun. Geong produced the song with Han Tae Soo, who also mixed and mastered the track. Han Tae Soo and Lee Woong handled the song's arrangement. Musically, "Tilaluha" is characterized as a soft soulful ballad, complete with vocal harmonies, drums, and a string section in its instrumentalization.

The lyrics of the song are about an unrequited love and a breakup, narrating a person's affection for a woman who loves another man and their desire to overcome the sorrow the person had to go through. Sejun described the lyrics to the song as "about a love you can never have", further intensified by the line: "Kung wala nang pag-asa turuan mo naman akong limutin ka." (lit. 'If there is no more hope, teach me how to forget you.') He wrote the lyrics to the song by taking inspiration from a book or a film plot, for which he denied any supposed connections of the lyrics to his personal life.

== Reception ==
"Tilaluha" received mixed responses from music critics' retrospective reviews. SB19's vocals were subject to praise by Billboard Philippines's editors and Nylon Manila's Rafael Bautista. Bautista described the vocals as "on point" and that the harmonies were "smooth", which he believed allowed each member time to showcase their vocal abilities, finalizing that the song is beautiful and underrated. The songwriting was also met with positive feedback, with Marisse Panaligan of GMA Integrated News opining the music and lyrics of the track as similar to other OPM songs and Rappler commenting that the lyrics in "Tilaluha" felt like they were written based on personal experience. However, apart from the vocals, the review from Billboard Philippines found the rest of the song unremarkable, while Bautista also questioned the band's decision to release a ballad as their debut material.

Upon its release, "Tilaluha" had a lukewarm reception, and the song did not perform well commercially. Bautista attributed the lack of initial success of the single to SB19 establishing a new market and the unpopularity of P-pop groups at the time of its release. The group was disappointed with the underwhelming reception the single saw and began contemplating parting ways. In their potentially last effort, SB19 chose to release an upbeat dance-pop song, "Go Up" (2019), as their next single, agreeing that they would disband if they would remain unsuccessful. Upon its release, the single went viral on YouTube, making SB19 achieve mainstream success and marking their breakthrough.

== Live performances ==
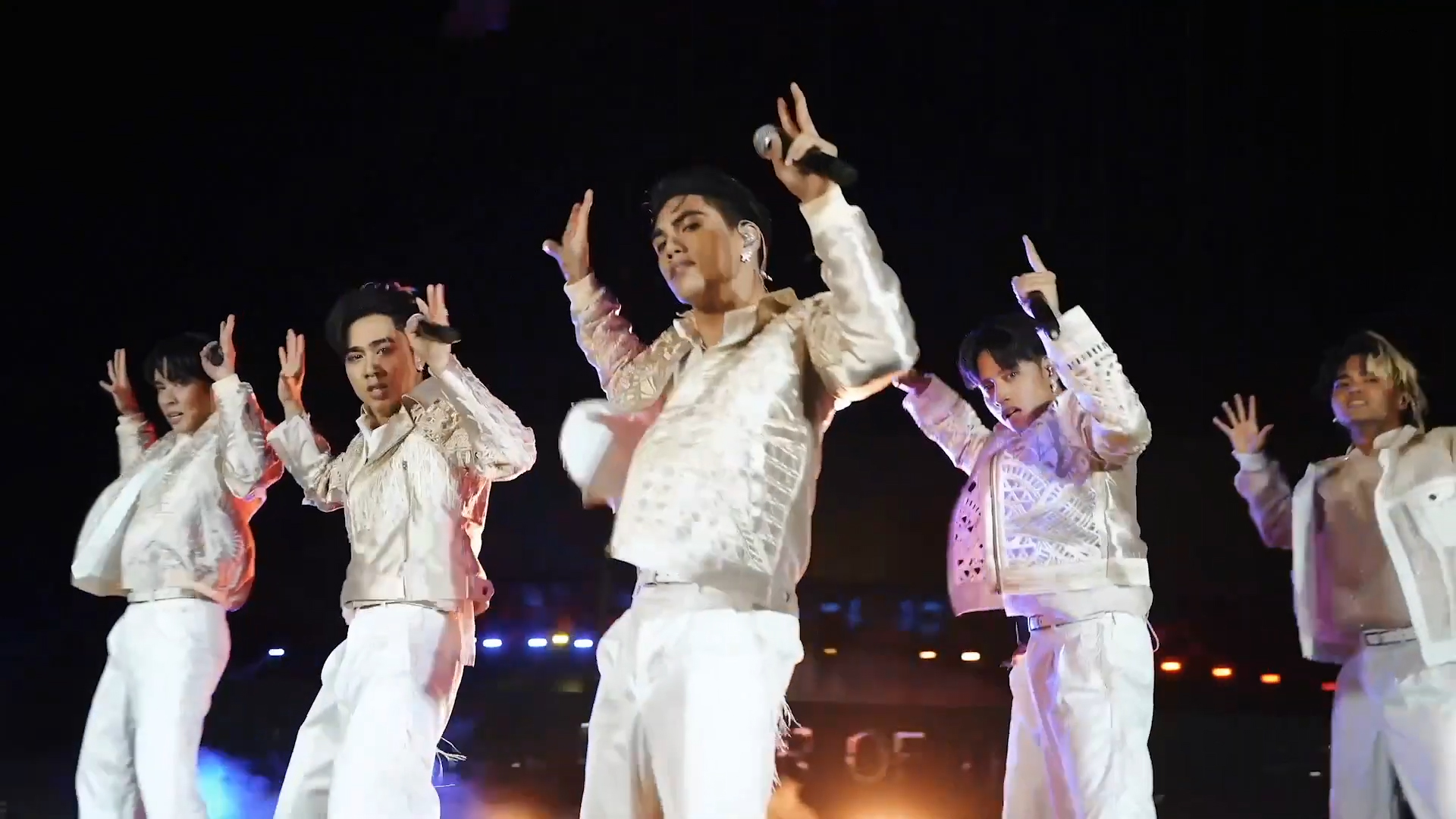
SB19 at the Round: ASEAN–Korea Music Festival 2021, representing the Philippines, where they performed "Tilaluha"

"Tilaluha" has been part of set lists of several concerts by SB19, including 2021's Back in the Zone, Forte: A Pop Orchestra Concert, and Our Zone: SB19's Third Anniversary Concert, and during their world tours WYAT (Where You At) Tour (2022) and Pagtatag! World Tour (2023–2024). During Forte, the group performed a new rendition of the song with a classical and orchestral arrangement backed by Battig Chamber Orchestra, while during their shows for the Pagtatag! World Tour, SB19 performed a mashup of "Tilaluha" and "Hanggang sa Huli". Apart from concert performances, the band recorded a performance of "Tilaluha" along with other songs at the Cultural Center of the Philippines Complex in Pasay to represent the Philippines at the Round: ASEAN–Korea Music Festival 2021.

== Credits and personnel ==
Credits are adapted from the song's music video and music streaming service Tidal.

- SB19 – vocals
- Geong Seong Han – composer, producer
- Kim Kyeong Su – composer
- John Paulo Nase – lyricist
- Han Tae Soo – arrangement, producer, mixing, mastering
- Lee Woong – arrangement

== Release history ==
Release dates and formats for "Tilaluha"
Region	Date	Format(s)	Label	Ref.
Various	October 26, 2018	Digital download; streaming	ShowBT Philippines	
Various	February 1, 2020	Digital download; streaming	Sony Philippines	
