= Maximillian (singer) =

Danish singer-songwriter

- Born: Maximillian Viktor Rasmussen; November 12, 1998 (age 27); Copenhagen, Denmark
- Genres: Pop; R&B
- Occupations: Singer; songwriter; producer
- Instruments: Vocals; piano
- Years active: 2017–present
- Labels: Universal Music

Maximillian Viktor Rasmussen (born November 12, 1998), known mononymously as Maximillian, is a Danish singer and songwriter. He rose to fame with his 2019 hit single "Beautiful Scars", from his extended play Still Alive (2020), (Note: There is some confusion regarding Maximillian's debut EP. One source states that he released Ripples (2019) and considers it his debut EP. Another source claims that Still Alive (2020), is regarded as his debut EP.) which gained international recognition, particularly in Philippines. He began his career by performing cover songs, which he uploaded on platforms such as Facebook and YouTube. By the time he was 17, he had begun writing his own songs and was starting to gain recognition for his work.

== Career ==
Maximillian began his music career with the release of his debut single "Higher" in 2017. In 2018, he released "Hollow Days", later that year, an acoustic version was also released.

In 2019, he gained international attention with his single "Beautiful Scars". The song became a hit across Southeast Asia, earned multi-platinum certification in the Philippines, and accumulated millions of streams on Spotify and YouTube.

In 2020, he released his EP Still Alive, featuring eight tracks, including the hit single "Beautiful Scars".

In 2021, Maximillian collaborated with Filipino singer-songwriter Moira Dela Torre to release an acoustic version of "Beautiful Scars". In October, he released his debut album, Too Young, featuring 11 tracks. The album includes singles such as "Turn Around", "Mirror", "With You", "Happier", "Love Like This", "Purple Trees (We Can Just Dance)", "Losing Game", and "Cheater" featuring swedish singer LOVA.

== Artistry ==
Maximillian cited inspiration by artists such as James Blake, Frank Ocean, and Justin Bieber, his music draws heavily from his personal experiences of struggle and heartbreak. He attended a Pink Floyd concert with his father, where he realized that he wanted to pursue a career in music. His music career began in 2017 with the release of his debut electro-R&B song, "Higher". He continued to release a series of emotional and raw singles, which eventually led to the release of his extended play Ripples (2019).

== Discography ==
=== Studio albums ===
- Too Young (2021)

=== EPs ===
Year	Title	Label
2019	Ripples	Universal Music
2020	Still Alive	Universal Music

List of singles, with year released and album name shown
Title	Year	Album
"Higher"	2017	—
"Hollow Days"	2018	—
"On My Mind"	2019	Ripples
"Ripples"	2019	Ripples
"Beautiful Scars"	2019	Still Alive
"If You Wanna"	2019	—
"Love Like This"	2021	Too Young
"Cheater" (with LOVA)	2021	Too Young
"Letters"	2021	Too Young
"When Scars Become Art II"	2022	—
"I'm Not Me"	2022	—
"Miss Her" (with Nicklas Sahl)	2023	—
"Best of Me"	2023	—
"Honest Too"	2024	—
"Day and Night"	2024	—
"Home"	2024	—
