= Moonlight (Ian Asher, SB19 and Terry Zhong song) =

2024 single

Single by Ian Asher, SB19 and Terry Zhong
- Released: May 3, 2024
- Studio: Sony Music (New York City)
- Genre: EDM; dance-pop
- Length: 2:48
- Label: Liquid State; Sony Philippines
- Songwriters: Ian McNelley; Terry Zhong; Jackson Lee Morgan; Lenno Linjama; Sophie Pauline Curtis; Nick Cozine
- Producers: Ian Asher; Terry Zhong; Lenno Linjama

Ian Asher singles chronology
"Touch Me" (2024)	"Moonlight" (2024)	"Shake, Shake" (2024)

SB19 singles chronology
"Gento" (2023)	"Moonlight" (2024)	"Ready" (2024)

Terry Zhong singles chronology
"Spring Snow" (2024)	"Moonlight" (2024)	"Waking of a World" (2024)

Music video
- "Moonlight" on YouTube

"Moonlight" (stylized in all uppercase) is a song by the American record producer Ian Asher, Filipino boy band SB19, and Chinese record producer Terry Zhong. The song was written by the song's producers Ian Asher, Terry Zhong, and Lenno Linjama with Jackson Lee Morgan, Sophie Pauline Curtis, and Nick Cozine. An EDM and dance-pop song, it has sensual lyricism about fantasizing romantic desires with their partner. The song was released as a single via Liquid State and Sony Music Philippines on May 3, 2024.

The development of "Moonlight" began while the boy band embarked on their Pagtatag! World Tour (2023–2024) when they met Ian Asher during the North American leg of the tour. The single's accompanying music video was directed by Kerbs Balagtas, with Justin as the creative director. The video's concept revolved around "craziness" and features SB19 in minimalist visuals, performing a choreography with backup dancers. The single won Best Global Collaboration Recording at the 2025 Awit Awards.

== Background and release ==
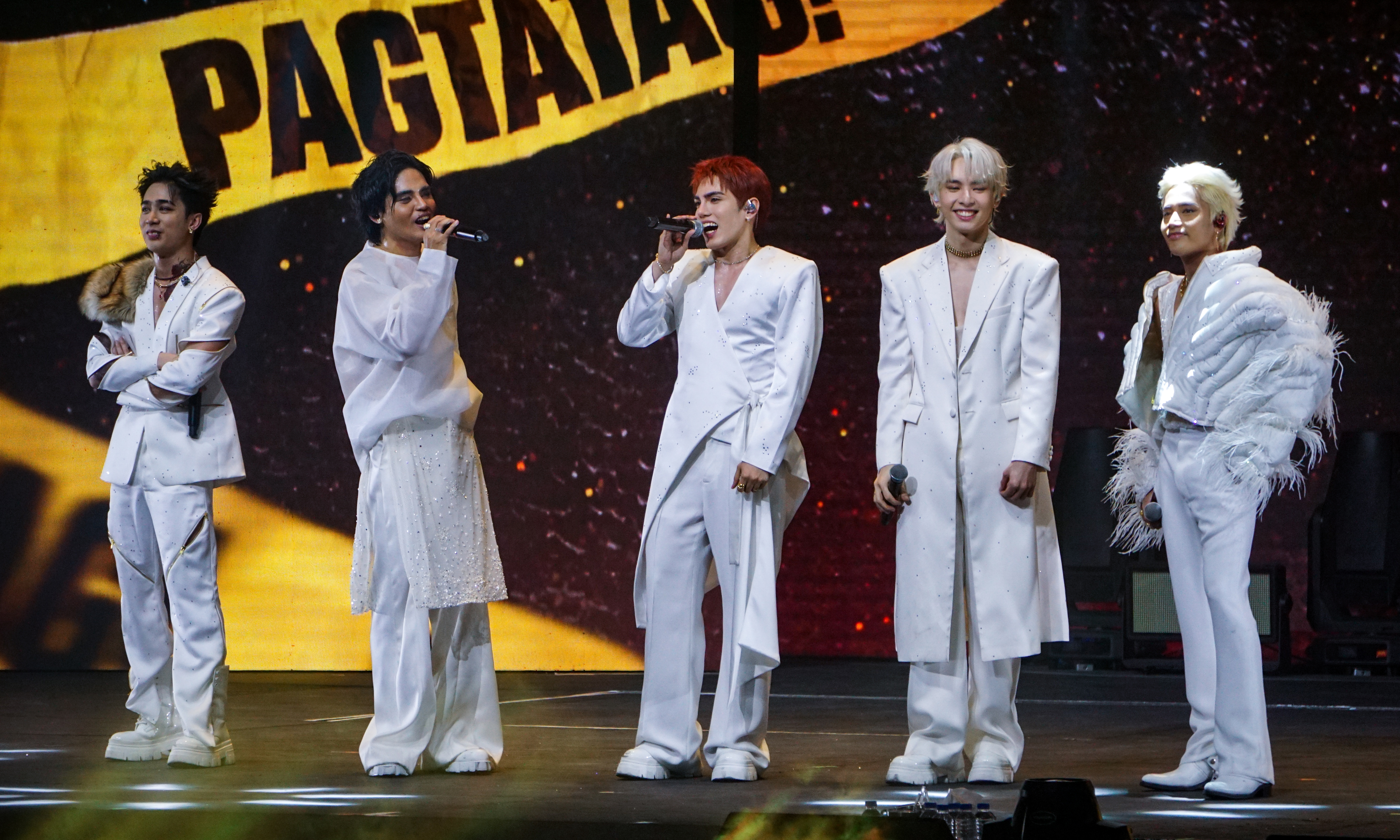
SB19 at the Pagtatag! World Tour (2023); they met Ian Asher while touring for its North American leg.

In 2023, the Filipino boy band SB19 released their second extended play (EP), Pagtatag!. Its lead single, "Gento" (2023), was considered a "resounding success", giving the boy band their first entry to Billboard record charts: World Digital Song Sales—a first among Filipino groups—and Philippines Songs, peaking at numbers eight and eleven respectively. The band embarked on their second world concert tour to support the EP, Pagtatag! World Tour, visiting Asia and North America. SB19 and the American record producer Ian Asher met while the group were on their North American leg of the tour; they were amazed at Asher's talent at a young age: "[We] met Ian Asher during our tour in the US, and we were surprised at how talented and prolific he is at such a young age."

On April 22, 2024, the boy band posted a video visualizer through their social media accounts featuring a snippet of the song, announcing their collaboration with Ian Asher and Chinese record producer Terry Zhong, the song's title, and its release date. The song was made available for pre-save on digital streaming platforms on April 24, 2024, and SB19 began releasing several teasers associated with the record leading up to its release through a choreography video snippet, posters, and a music video trailer. Liquid State and Sony Music Philippines released "Moonlight" on May 3, 2024, as a single.

== Composition and lyrics ==
"Moonlight" is 2 minutes and 48 seconds long. Ian McNelley, Terry Zhong, Jackson Lee Morgan, Lenno Linjama, Sophie Pauline Curtis, and Nick Cozine were credited as songwriters. SB19 recorded the vocals for the song at Sony Music Studios in New York City, New York, with Brendan Morawski as the recording engineer. Record producers Ian Asher, Zhong, and Linjama handled its production. The latter programmed the track and played the keyboards and guitar. Serge Courtois mixed the song, while Matt Tilston mastered the recording at Wired Studios in London, England.

Musically, "Moonlight" is an upbeat song composed with a fast-paced melody featuring an EDM and dance-pop production. The boy band considered the song's musicality new for them and that their collaboration with Ian Asher and Terry Zhong gave them "room to explore and expand our horizons as artists". It is a love song with sensual lyrics, discussing yearning for their partner and fantasizing romantic and intimate desires: "Want you in every way / Want you to scream my name / With my hands around your waist / Yeah, I li...li...like / Doing what we do in the moonlight / I be loving you, baby, all night".

== Music video ==
Kerbs Balagtas directed the music video, and SB19 band member Justin served as the creative director. The video was released on YouTube on May 3, 2024, the same day as the song's release. The media described it as "minimalistic", depicting the boy band and their backup dancers wearing white button-up long-sleeves and light gray pants, dancing to the song's eclectic choreography. Justin finds the song's lyrics "euphoric", in which he conceived a concept of having the video to be "crazy" and given the "out-of-this-world treatment". Jay Joseph Roncesvalles conceived the choreography for the video.

== Accolades ==
Awards and nominations for "Moonlight"
Award	Year	Category	Result	Ref.
Awit Awards	2025	Best Global Collaboration Recording	Won	
Myx Music Awards	2024	Music Video of the Year	Won	
P-pop Music Awards	2024	Song of the Year	Nominated	

== Credits and personnel ==
Credits are adapted from the song's music video.

Locations

- Recorded at Sony Music Studios (New York City, New York)
- Mastered at Wired Studios (London, England)

Musicians

- SB19 – vocals
- Ian Asher – producer
- Terry Zhong – producer, songwriter
- Lenno Linjama – producer, songwriter, keyboards, guitar, programming
- Ian McNelley – songwriter
- Jackson Lee Morgan – songwriter
- Sophie Pauline Curtis – songwriter
- Nick Cozine – songwriter

Technical

- Serge Courtois – mixing
- Matt Tilston – mastering
- Brian Lotho – vocal producer
- Brendan Morawski – recording engineering
