= Go Up =

2019 single by SB19

Single by SB19

from the album Get in the Zone
- Language: Filipino; English
- Released: July 26, 2019
- Genre: dance-pop; EDM
- Length: 3:09
- Label: Sony Music
- Songwriters: John Paulo Nase; Oh Won Lee; Glow
- Producer: Oh Won Lee

SB19 singles chronology
"Tilaluha" (2018)	"Go Up" (2019)	"Alab (Burning)" (2019)

Music video
- "Go Up" on YouTube

"Go Up" is a song recorded by Filipino boy band SB19, released on July 26, 2019, as the second single of their debut album Get in the Zone. It was written by Oh Won Lee, Glow and SB19 member Pablo. It won Song of the Year in Myx Music Awards and Pop Performance of the Year in Wish Music Awards.

== Background and release ==
After the lukewarm reception of their debut single "Tilaluha", SB19 had almost decided to quit and go on separate ways. Josh shared reasons which is about how hard for performers in the country to earn money for a living as well as the stress in training. They dedicate everything they experienced on their second single "Go Up" which they described as their "last shot". Each of the members dedicated for whom they go up for: Justin goes up for himself first so that he can start helping others; Ken goes up for his goals; Stell said he goes up for his family because of their unending support; Josh goes up for himself sharing his terrible childhood history; Pablo go up for himself, family, and everyone who believes in him.

"Go Up" was composed by Oh Won Lee and Glow, with lyrics by SB19 member Pablo. Oh Won Lee and Glow also arranged the song, and Oh Won Lee is also credited as producer. The recording, mixing and mastering were done at RealBros Sound Studio in South Korea.

"Go Up" was released on July 26, 2019. It was released first by the group before "Alab (Burning)" instead even it was already finished recording. After a couple of months being released, "Go Up" received very minimal reception and the group already decided to stop. However, on September 2, 2019, a fan posted the dance practice video on Twitter and Facebook, promoting the group and saying that she "didn't feel any cringe at all" while listening to the song. Her post quickly gained traction, and after that, SB19 became viral giving them their career breakthrough.

Ito yung nagstart ng everything, kung ano man yung meron kami ngayon. Mayroon kaming A'TIN dahil sa 'Go Up'. [...] Kung hindi po nagwork, maggigive up na kami pero fortunately pinagpala po kami at nakilala po yung grupo namin...natupad na pangarap. (This started everything, whatever we have today. We have A'TIN because of 'Go Up'. [...] If it didn't work, we would have given up, but fortunately, we were blessed and our group became known...a dream come true.)

— Pablo, Rappler

== Cover versions and usage ==
Torch sisters, a group of five young American girls, did a sing and dance cover of "Go Up" in Tagalog language. In the second episode of BBTV, Ben&Ben's YouTube series, the band did a "Spin the Wheel" challenge to other OPM songs but to random music genres where they performed "Go Up" in reggae version. JM Yosures performed the song as a contest piece in Tawag ng Tanghalan in which he was declared as the champion; later, he sang it again on Sunday noontime show ASAP. A version of the song with modified lyrics was used by Netflix Philippines for Netflix PH "Catch Up" featuring the group while Lucky Me Philippines used modified lyrics for "Go Cup" jingle promoting Hot Cheese Ramyun and Jjamppong noodle flavors.

Another modified version was used for Pizza Hut entitled "Make it Great" in 2022.

In August 2025, K-pop boy group AHOF, which includes Filipino member JL, performed a cover of the song during their first fan concert in the Philippines.

== Live performances ==
The song was performed in various areas in the Philippines as one of the setlist of the group in their nationwide Get in the Zone concert. SB19 performed "Go Up" live on the 5th Wish Music Awards in which the song won the Wishclusive Pop Performance of the Year. On October 11, 2020, they performed in the YouTube Fan Fest stage virtually with "Love Goes" and "Go Up" remixes. Included also in the setlist on their first online concert are songs in the Get in the Zone with "Go Up" as an encore show. On 2020 year-end, the group performed "Hanggang sa Huli", "Alab", "Go Up", "Ikako", and Pepsi commercial jingle "Sundin ang Puso" at Bye2020 concert.

== Credits and personnel ==
Credits adapted from the song's official listings on YouTube and Tidal.

- Oh-Won Lee – composer, arranger, producer, vocal direction, bass
- Glow – composer, arranger
- John Paulo Nase – lyrics, vocals
- Geong Seong Han – executive producer
- Stellvester Ajero – vocals
- Justin de Dios – vocals, album art (with Xi-Anne Avanceña)
- Josh Cullen Santos – vocals
- Felip Jhon Suson – vocals
- Ha-yong Ji - chorus
- Ju-hyong Lee - piano
- Won-sang Lee - guitar

== Accolades ==
Awards and nominations for "Go Up"
Award	Year	Category	Result	Ref.
Myx Music Awards	2020	Song of the Year	Won	
Wish 107.5 Music Awards	2020	Wishclusive Pop Performance of the Year	Won	

== Release history ==
Region	Date	Format	Label	Ref
Various	July 19, 2019	Digital download; streaming	ShowBT Philippines	
Various	February 2, 2020	Digital download; streaming	Sony Music	
