= Alab (Burning) =

2018 single by SB19

Single by SB19

from the album Get in the Zone
- Language: Filipino; English
- Released: December 25, 2019
- Recorded: 2018
- Genre: synth-pop; dance-pop; bubblegum pop
- Length: 3:02
- Label: Sony Music
- Songwriters: John Paulo Nase; Han Tae Soo
- Producers: Han Tae Soo; Geong Seong Han

SB19 singles chronology
"Go Up" (2019)	"Alab (Burning)" (2019)	"Hanggang sa Huli" (2020)

Music video
- "Alab (Burning)" on YouTube

"Alab (Burning)" is a song recorded by Filipino boy band SB19, released on December 25, 2019 (on Christmas Day 2019), through Sony Music. The song was released as the third single from the group's debut album Get in the Zone, and was written by the leader Pablo and Korean composer Han Tae Soo. It was their first single released under their new record label Sony Music Philippines.

== Background and composition ==
The song was written by Pablo and produced by Korean composer Han Tae Soo. It was recorded first by the group before "Go Up" but decided to release it later and prioritize the former since it describe their journey more as a group. "Alab (Burning)" is a dance-pop and synth-pop that was made with "sophisticated production, digital beats, and pulsating grooves". The leader of the group described the song as "relatable and fun, exciting and light" and further explained that it is "basically about finding your true love and doing whatever it takes to win that certain someone".

== Music video ==
The music video for "Alab (Burning)" was released on January 9, 2020, on SB19's YouTube channel. In the intro of the video, the members were asked about the color of their love that will represent their personality. Josh shared that the red color best represents him because of his dominant personality and as someone who doesn't like being controlled, which explained the red ropes in his zone—it showed how love bounded him. The box in Ken's set production represented his comfort zone due to him being introvert, but when it comes to love, he realized that getting out of that box should be done in order to express it. Justin portrayed as an artist in the video with frames representing different kinds of personalities and emotions. He was trying to figure out what personality was he should be to win the love but in the end, he realized he has to be himself only. Stell's color was yellow representing happiness and was seeking for the answer on what he could do for love to last. Pablo, on the other hand, chose the color violet since it is the hottest in the color palette of a flame which was for him, represents love for music, for family or for passion.

On October 13, 2022, the "Alab (Burning)" was nominated in the Music Video of the Year category on the 13th Star Awards for Music by the Philippine Movie and Press Club.

== Credits and personnel ==
Credits adapted from Tidal and music video.

- SB19 – primary vocals
- Han Tae Soo – composer, arrangement, producer, mastering, mixing, recording engineer
- John Paulo Nase – vocals, songwriting
- Geong Seong Han – executive producer
- Park Jung Un – mastering engineer
- Xi-Anne Avancena – cover art design

== Media usage ==
- A version of the song with modified lyrics was used in a TM advertisement featuring SB19.

== Accolades ==
Awards and nominations for "Alab (Burning)"
Award	Year	Category	Result	Ref.
Awit Awards	2020	Best Performance by a Group Recording Artist	Nominated	
Myx Music Awards	2021	Music Video of the Year	Won	
Myx Music Awards	2021	Song of the Year	Won	
PMPC Star Awards for Music	2022	Music Video of the Year	Nominated	
Wish 107.5 Music Awards	2021	Wishclusive Pop Performance of the Year	Nominated	
