= ShowBT Entertainment =

South Korean-Philippine entertainment company

ShowBT
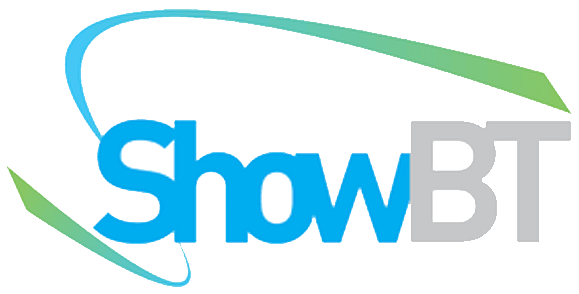
- Native name: ㈜쇼비티
- Company type: Private
- Industry: Entertainment
- Founded: 2003
- Founder: Jung Seong-han (정성한)
- Headquarters: Seoul, South Korea; Manila, Philippines
- Area served: Asia
- Key people: Charles Kim (CEO)
- Services: Music Production, Artist Development, Artist Management; Organizational Cultural Event, BTL & Digital Marketing Solutions, Corporate & Business Education
- Owner: Charles Kim
- Website: showbt.co.kr

ShowBT Group is an entertainment, creative content and event promotion group headquartered in South Korea. The parent company was founded in 2003 by Jung Seong-han (정성한), a South Korean comedian who was a former member of the popular comedic team Cult Triple. ShowBT's main business area is entertainment and media, in which it aims to introduce a new paradigm to the Southeast Asian cultural market through the production and distribution of Korean Wave-based cultural content. Services provided within this area include artist management; television, music, public events production; and social media engagement, public relations, and entertainment marketing. The group's other areas of business include corporate and organizational culture enhancement, integrated BTL and digital marketing solutions, and digital development.

In 2015, ShowBT opened its first foreign subsidiary branch, ShowBT Philippines. This was followed by ShowBT Vietnam and ShowBT Thailand in 2016, and ShowBT MENA (with an office in the United Arab Emirates) in 2017.

ShowBT Philippines produced Aja Aja Tayo!, the first Filipino-Korean reality variety show in the Philippine television broadcast on TV5. The company previously manages the global pop group SB19, the first Pinoy pop group and Southeast Asian act to make it to the final list of Billboard Music Awards for Top Social Artist and nominated to the MTV Europe Music Awards, and 4th Impact, a Filipino girl group who competed in the twelfth season of the British singing contest The X Factor, where they finished in fifth place. ShowBT has also managed soloist rapper Pablo and RnB singer Felip.

== History ==
In 2005, ShowBT has been operating a department specializing in education development and presenting participatory educational contents that combine various genres including literature and art.

Founder Jung Seong-han's long-time goal has been the "localization" of K-pop. It is the reason ShowBT introduced a new paradigm to the Southeast Asian cultural market through the production and distribution of cultural contents based on Hallyu (Korean wave).

"One big rationale behind SB19's unusual rise is the members' musical talent, which they have been polishing for three years before the debut. Everyone said I was insane to train them for such a lengthy period without making any money. But I launched SB19 after having the members practice singing and dancing for a song 1,000 times until they were impeccable." Jung told The Korea Times on Thursday at a restaurant in Hyehwa-dong, Seoul.

— Dong Sun-hwa, koreatimes

In July 2018, ShowBT Philippines receive permission to air Aja Aja Tayo! show on TV5 for 13 consecutive weeks. The first Korean show to receive permission on the free-to-air television in the Philippines.

In May 2018, ShowBT oversaw the 2018 Miss Korea Pageant regional preliminaries.

On November 10, 2021, ShowBT Philippines publicly launched SB19's sister group KAIA.

== Current artists ==
=== Philippines ===
==== Recording artists ====
Groups

- KAIA (2021-present)
  - Charice (2021–present)
  - Angela (2021–present)
  - Alexa (2021–present)
  - Sophia (2021–present)
  - Charlotte (2021–present)

Soloists

- Mona Gonzales
- JinHo Bae
- Jay Clifford Bernardino

== Former artists ==
- SB19 (2018–23)
  - Josh (2018–23)
  - Pablo (2018–23)
  - Stell (2018–23)
  - Ken (2018–23)
  - Justin (2018–23)
- KAIA (2021–present)
  - Joanna (2021–22)
- 4th Impact (2021–23)
  - Almira (2021–23)
  - Irene (2021–23)
  - Mylene (2021–23)
  - Celina (2021–23)
- Z2Z (2023)
  - J.O. (2023)
  - Soya (2023)
