= The Voice Generations =

The Voice Generations may refer to:

- The Voice Generations (Australian TV series)
- The Voice Generations (Philippine TV series)
