= Tabi (song) =

Single by Xonara
- Language: English; Tagalog; Cebuano
- B-side: "Tabi (acoustic version)"
- Released: May 15, 2026
- Genre: P-pop; EDM; rock; hip-hop; R&B; trap
- Length: 3:18
- Label: 1Z; UMG
- Composer: Joshua Caleb Vidamo
- Lyricists: Xonara; Joshua Daniel Nase; Gaia Ambayec
- Producers: Joshua Caleb Vidamo; Joshua Daniel Nase

"Tabi" (lit. 'Move') is the debut single by Filipino girl group Xonara. It was released as a digital single on May 15, 2026, accompanied by a music video a day later. It was composed by Joshua Caleb Vidamo and written by Xonara, Joshua Daniel Nase and Gaia Ambayec.

== Background ==
In 2024, 1Z Entertainment initiated auditions and talent searches to develop its first girl group. The project formed part of the company's expansion of its artists roster and contribute to the growth of Filipino pop music locally and internationally.

== Composition ==
"Tabi" is a Pinoy pop song that has also been said to incorporate EDM, hip-hop, rock, R&B, and trap elements. The track contains "militaristic" beats, chants, and 808 drums. Its lyrics are written in a mix of English, Tagalog, and Cebuano, containing themes of struggle and a reference to the Greek myth of Sisyphus.

== Release and promotion ==
The group first performed "Tabi" at SB19's Wakas at Simula: The Trilogy Concert Finale on April 18, 2026. On May 1, the group released their concept photo, showcasing the group's identity and style with the caption, "Each her own, all in sync." A day later, the group performed at Aurora Music Festival 2026, alongside SB19.

On May 15, the group officially released their single, and their launch will culminate in an event called Xonara's World at Escolta Street in Manila, coinciding with the music video's release a day later. The music video showcased a Y2K-inspired concept in grunge streetwear, posing against urban backdrops. SB19 member Justin co-directed and conceptualized the music video, collaborating on styling with fellow member Ken. Less than a day after its release, the music video garnered over 219,000 views.

On June 30, the group released the acoustic version of their single as B-side.

== Critical reception ==
Professional ratings
Review scores
| Source | Rating |
|---|---|
| Rolling Stone Philippines | 3.5/5 stars |

Elijah Pareño of Rolling Stone Philippines gave "Tabi" 3.5 stars out of 5, saying the track "doesn't overstay its welcome nor drown itself in bloated production". Samantha Radaza of the Visayan zine Kasing2 called the song one of the strongest P-pop debuts so far.

== Credits and personnel ==
Credits are adapted from Spotify.

- Xonara – vocals, lyricist
- Joshua Caleb Vidamo – composer, producer
- Joshua Daniel Nase – lyricist, producer, mixing engineer, mastering engineer
- Gaia Ambayec – lyricist
- Emil Dela Rosa – mixing engineer
- John Paulo Nase – mixing engineer
