= Bulan (song) =

2022 single by Felip

Single by Felip
- Language: Filipino
- Released: May 28, 2022
- Recorded: 2022
- Genre: hip hop; R&B
- Length: 2:29
- Label: FELIP
- Songwriter: Felip Jhon Suson
- Producers: Felip Jhon Suson; Joshua Daniel Nase

Felip singles chronology
"Palayo" (2021)	"Bulan" (2022)

Music video
- "Bulan" on YouTube

"Bulan" (lit. transl. Moon), is a song by Filipino singer, songwriter, and producer Felip also known by his stage name Ken, released on May 28, 2022. He wrote the song and produced it with Joshua Daniel Nase. It is a R&B, hip hop-produced song which contains Bisayan word, makes a commentary on modern life through the myth of the Bicolano moon deity, Bulan. Felip uses the story of Bulan as a metaphor for crab mentality.

It premiered on YouTube on May 28, 2022. The music video features the sand dunes of Paoay and the Graciano Cliffs along Cape Bojeador in Ilocos Norte as the backdrop for the battle between darkness and light, taking inspiration from the deities and mythological creatures of pre-colonial times. The "Bulan" MV takes us on a journey to this world as Felip uses ancient Filipino lore as a metaphor for how he chooses to respond to the negativity he receives.

== Background and composition ==
Felip Jhon Suson wrote "Bulan" and co-produced it with singer-songwriter and producer, Joshua Daniel Nase. Thyro Alfaro mixed the song and also did the mastering and Gino Madrid performed the live guitar. His fellow SB19 member, Stell recorded the intro vocals. "Bulan" is two minutes and twenty-nine seconds long. It harnesses Felip's influences in hip hop and rock music while adding aggressive beats, rapping vocal line and a rhythmic ethnic elements into the mix. Compared to the smooth and sexy R&B groove of "Palayo," "Bulan" has a more experimental and aggressive sound, reminiscent of hip-hop tracks that are often used in krumping.

== Release and promotion ==
The track was originally scheduled to release a week earlier May 15, to coincide with the rare blood moon occurrence. In a statement on May 10, however, Felip revealed that he delayed its release due to the Philippines being at the “forefront of an important, historic event that will shape our future” – alluding to the country's Presidential election.

On May 23, the album preview was posted on Felip's Superior Son social media account the release "Bulan" physical CD and limited edition of vinyl.

On July 5, Felip performed his newest single, "Bulan," at The Recording Academy Grammy's online series Global Spin, which celebrates global music, international artists, and the world's sounds. He is the first Filipino act and P-pop artist and the first Pilipino Music featured on the Grammy's Global Spin live series.

== Music video ==
"Bulan" highlights Filipino deities and mythology of pre-colonial times. The lyrics play off this theme by mentioning figures like the moon goddess Haliya, serpent-like water dragon Bakunawa, and Felip performing as Bulan. The title of the single refers to the Bicolano deity in oral mythology called Bulan, who fell in love with the God of the afterlife, Sidapa.

"A creative interpretation of our nation’s collective memory of Filipino ancient deities. Definitive resources for this aspect of our culture have been destroyed during the colonial period, hence, the goal for this release is to encourage the youth to dig deep, discuss, and to keep this aspect of our memory alive for generations to come. The song's goal is to encourage discussions around our ancient culture and revisit this aspect of our collective memory as Filipinos."

— Felip, Myx Global

Felip uses the story of Bulan as a metaphor for crab mentality. The lyrics tell us not to be consumed by others' negative reactions when we gain success in life.

== Credits and personnel ==
Credits are adapted from Tidal and the song's music video.

- Felip – main vocals, writer, producer
- Stell – intro vocals
- Joshua Daniel Nase – producer
- Thyro Alfaro – mixing and mastering
- Gino Madrid – live guitar
- Jay Joseph Roncesvalles – choreographer
- Chapters PH, Bea Charlyn Laino – music video producer
