= The Voice Generations (Australian TV series) =

Australian singing competition television series

- Genre: Reality television
- Created by: John de Mol Jr.
- Presented by: Sonia Kruger
- Judges: Keith Urban; Rita Ora; Jessica Mauboy; Guy Sebastian
- Country of origin: Australia
- Original language: English
- No. of seasons: 1
- No. of episodes: 3

Production
- Executive producer: John de Mol Jr.
- Production location: Fox Studios Australia
- Running time: 90 minutes
- Production companies: ITV Studios Australia; Talpa

Original release
- Network: Seven Network
- Release: 31 January – 2 February 2022

Related
- The Voice

The Voice Generations is an Australian singing competition television series. It premiered on the Seven Network on 31 January 2022. It is based on the original The Voice of Holland.

Unlike the main series, the show features groups of at least two members coming from different generations with no age limit. Groups must have a pre-existing relationship such as families, friends, students and teachers, neighbours, and the like.

The series employs a panel of four coaches who critique the artists' performances and guide their teams of selected artists through the remainder of the season. They also compete to ensure that their act wins the competition, thus making them the winning coach. The coaching panel consists of Keith Urban, Guy Sebastian, Rita Ora, and Jessica Mauboy.

== Production ==
On 16 July 2021, The Voice casting website announced the application for a new version of the show to be broadcast in 2022: The Voice: Generations, where family or friend groups consisting in singers of all ages are the ones who can apply. This is an original version of The Voice franchise, with the idea being adapted to the Lithuanian series a few weeks later. The first season is hosted by Sonia Kruger and has Jessica Mauboy, Rita Ora, Guy Sebastian and Keith Urban as coaches.

== Format ==
The show is part of The Voice franchise and comprises three rounds: blind auditions, battle rounds, and grand finale.

=== Blind auditions ===
Four coaches, all noteworthy recording artists, create their teams of two groups through a blind audition process during the auditionee's performance. If two or more judges want the same group, the group has the final choice of coach.

=== Battles ===
Each group of singers is mentored and developed by their respective coach. In the Battles, coaches pit their two acts to go against each other in a sing-off. They all have different songs, after which the coach chooses which act will advance into the Grand Finale.

=== Grand finale ===
The final four groups compete against each other with the winner being decided by a public vote. Caitlin & Tim, from Team Rita, won the competition.

== Coaches and hosts ==
Prior to the premiere of the show, it was announced that Urban, Ora, Mauboy, and Sebastian would serve as the coaches for the series, all of whom have served as coaches in the tenth season of the original series. Sonia Kruger, who was also in the main version, is the show's host.

Coaches and host of The Voice: Generations

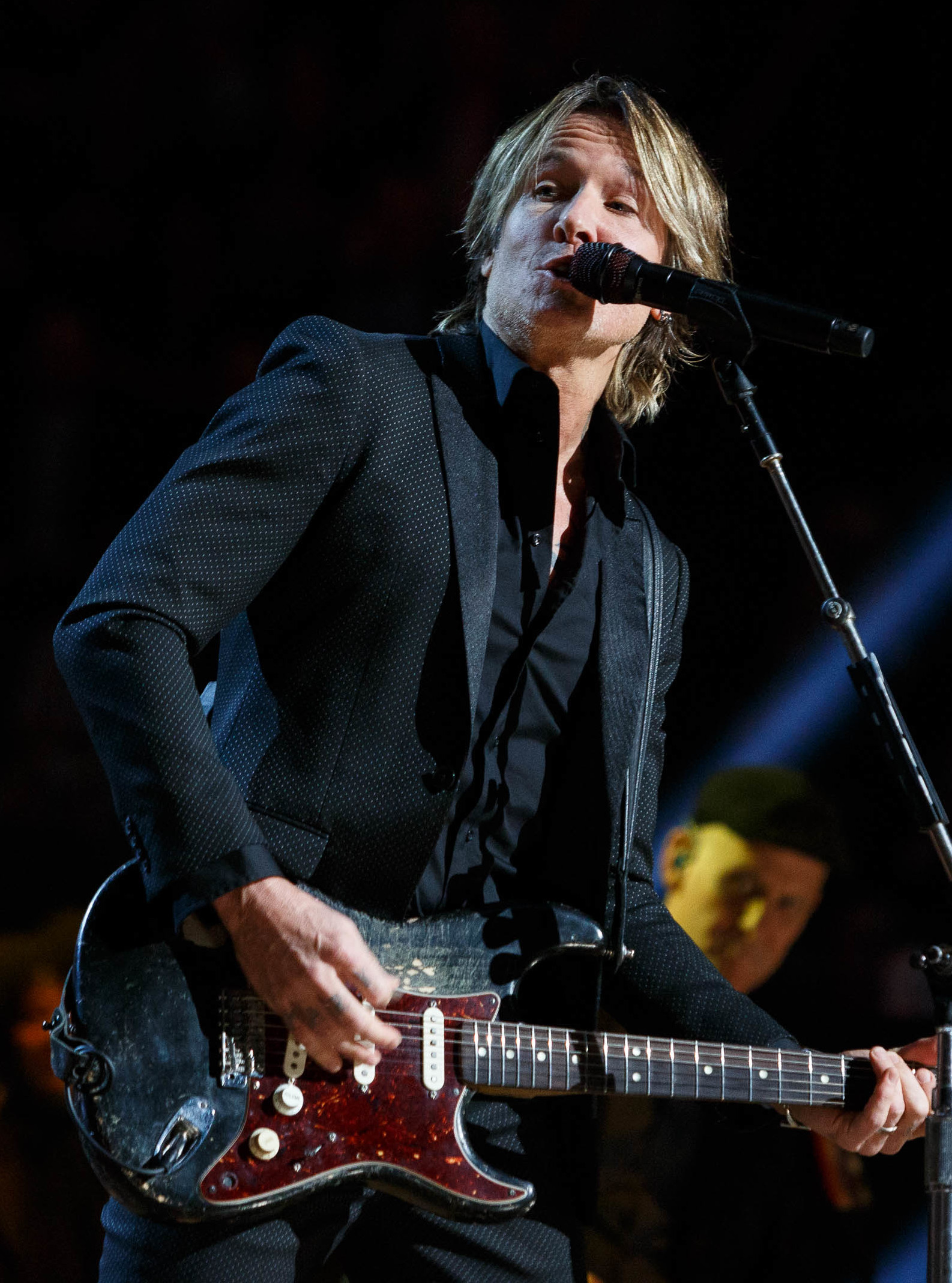
Keith Urban

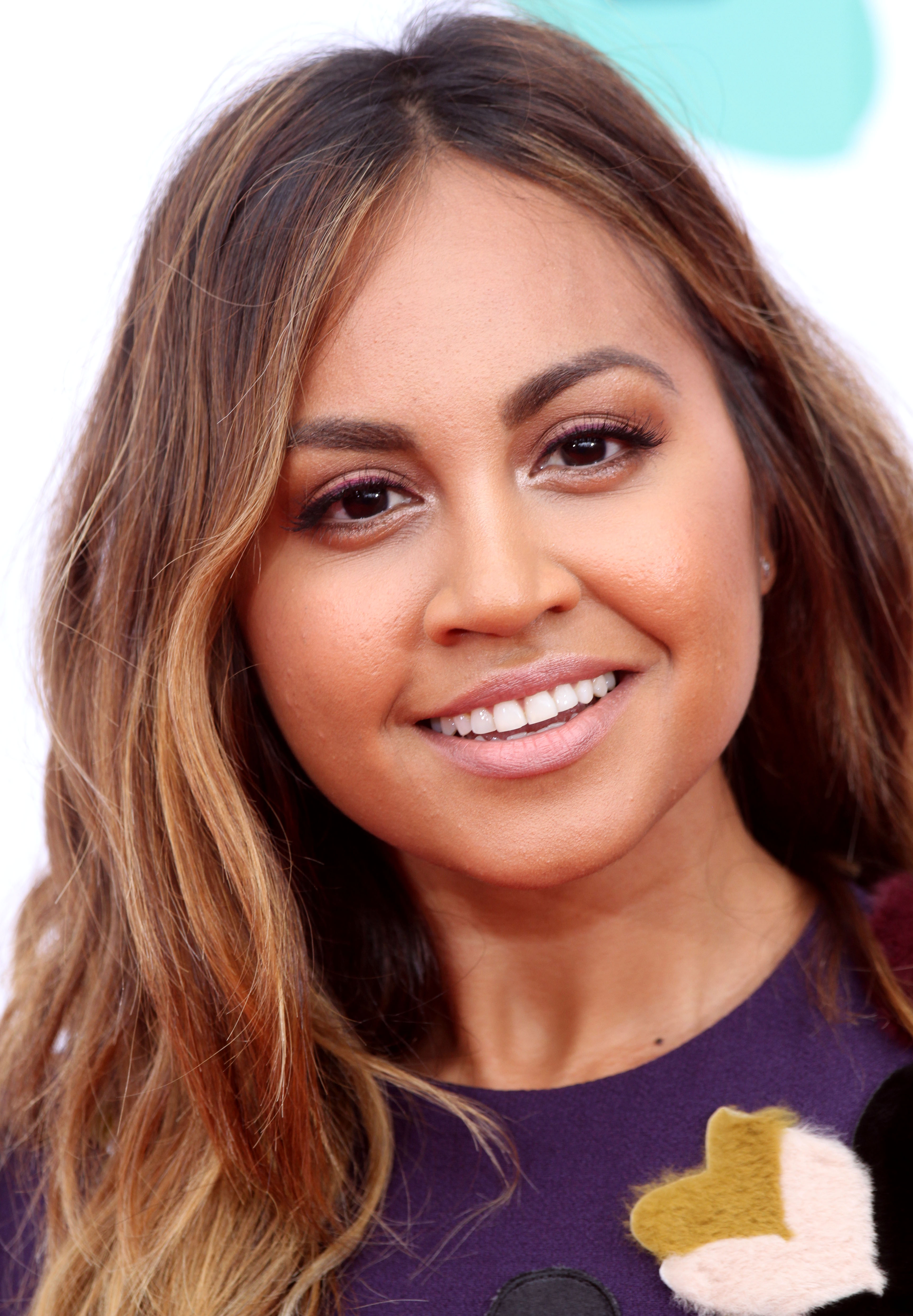
Jessica Mauboy

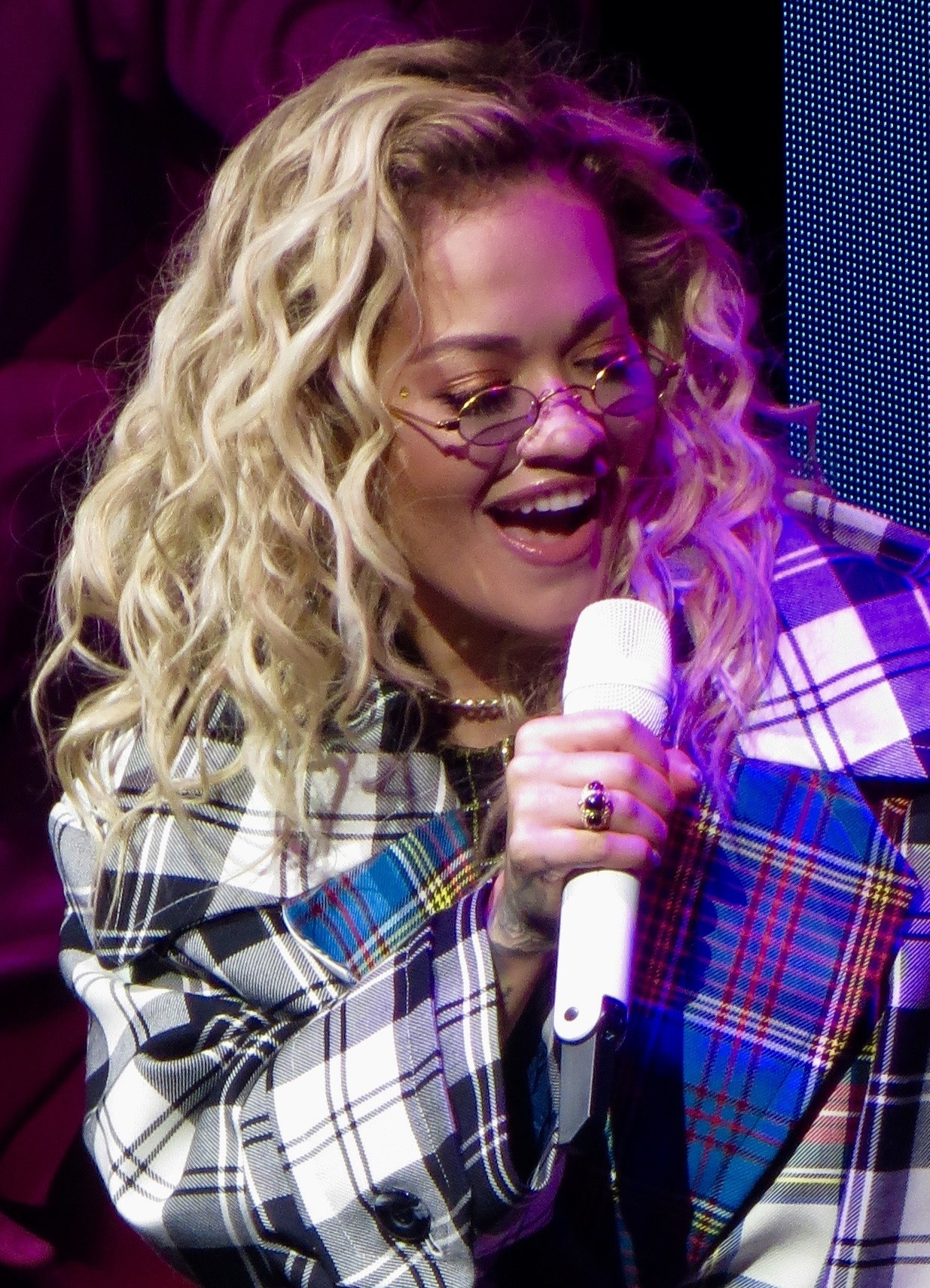
Rita Ora

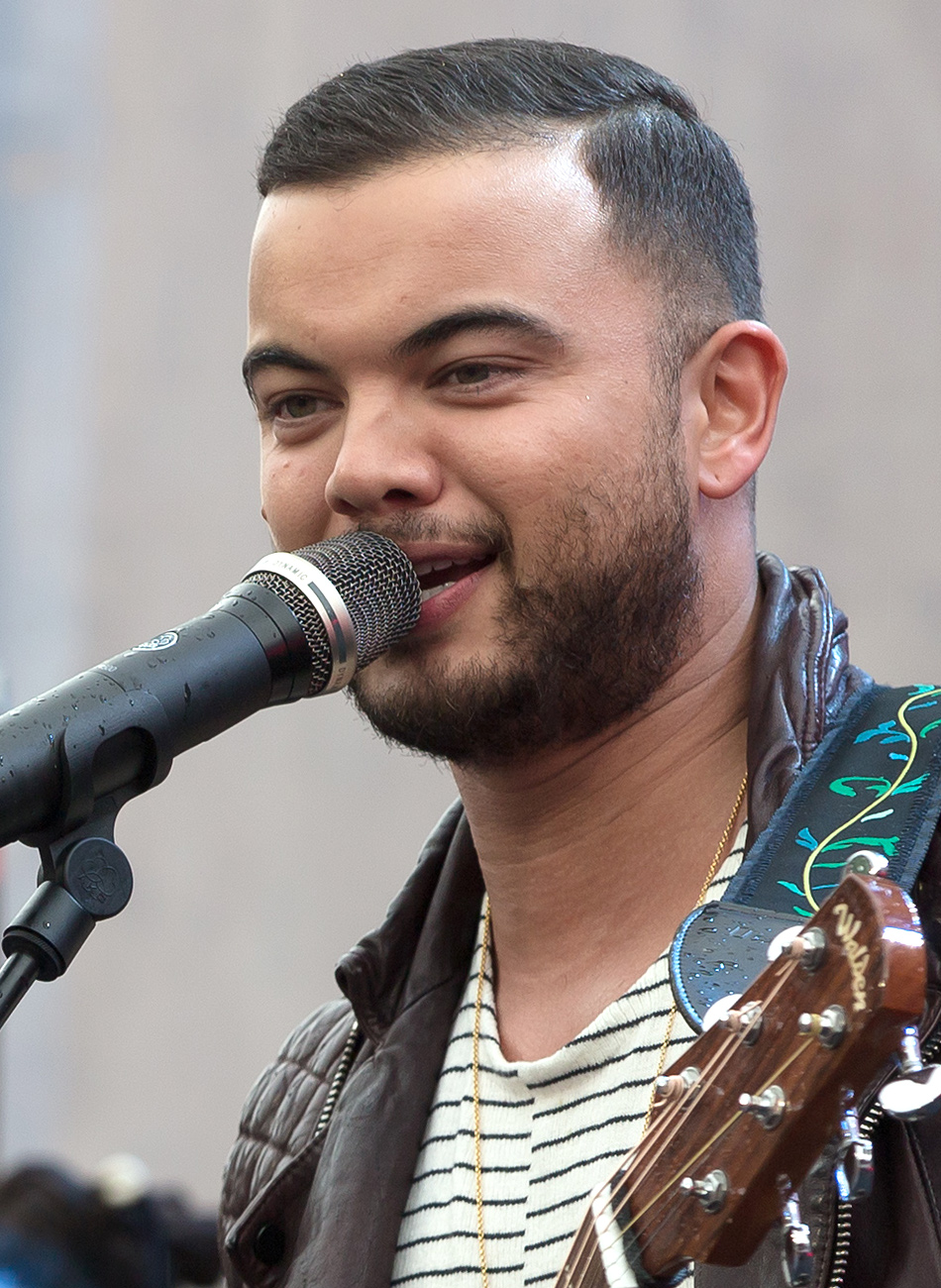
Guy Sebastian

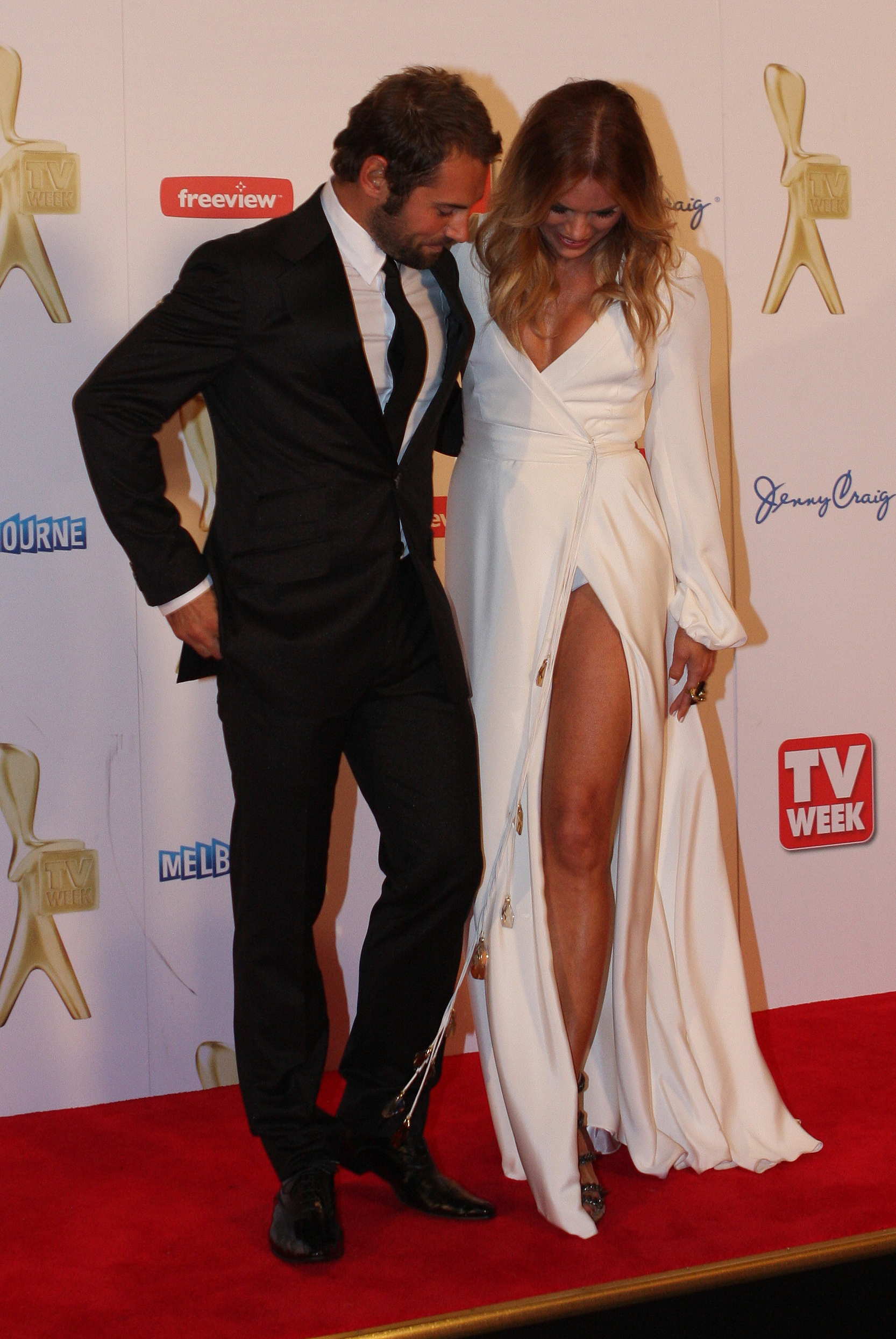
Sonia Kruger, right

== Series overview ==
The Voice Generations series overview
Season	Aired	Winner	Other finalists			Winning coach	Host	Coaches (chairs' order)			
Season	Aired	Winner	Other finalists			Winning coach	Host	1	2	3	4
1	2022	Caitlin & Tim	Jess & Kelsi	The Wenas	Ty & Eddie	Rita Ora	Sonia Kruger	Keith	Jess	Rita	Guy

== Season one ==
=== Teams ===
Colour key

- Winner
- Finalist
- Eliminated in the Battles

The Voice: Generations coaching teams
Coach	Top 8 Artists	
Keith Urban		
Keith Urban	Ty & Eddie	The O'Donnells
Jessica Mauboy		
Jessica Mauboy	Jess & Kelsi	Bloom & James
Rita Ora		
Rita Ora	Caitlin & Tim	Maurice & Micah
Guy Sebastian		
Guy Sebastian	The Wenas	Kids of Leo

- After the auditions, half of The Wenas had to self-isolate, and hence, spent the rest of the season from home.

=== Blind auditions ===
In the blind auditions, the coaches can get only two artists to fill their respective teams.

Blind auditions colour key
✔	Coach pressed "I WANT YOU" button
	Artist defaulted to this coach's team
	Artist elected to join this coach's team
	Artist eliminated as no coach pressed his or her "I WANT YOU" button

Blind auditions results
Episode	Order	Artist	Ages	Song	Coach's and artist's choices			
Episode	Order	Artist	Ages	Song	Keith	Jess	Rita	Guy
Episode 1 (Monday, 31 January)	1	The Wenas	9–57	"We Are Family"	✔	✔	✔	✔
Episode 1 (Monday, 31 January)	2	Maurice & Micah	41 & 12	"Baby"	✔	✔	✔	✔
Episode 1 (Monday, 31 January)	3	Christine & Harry	36 & 5	"If I Could Turn Back Time"	—	—	—	—
Episode 1 (Monday, 31 January)	4	Ty & Eddie	41 & 11	"Go Your Own Way"	✔	✔	✔	✔
Episode 1 (Monday, 31 January)	5	Bloom & James	35 & 53	"Rolling in the Deep"	—	✔	✔	—
Episode 1 (Monday, 31 January)	6	The Sulli-Vans	10–58	"Down Under"	—	—	—	—
Episode 1 (Monday, 31 January)	7	Maureen & Crystal	72 & 35	"This Is Me"	—	—	—	—
Episode 1 (Monday, 31 January)	8	The Hages	21–61	"Never Seen the Rain"	—	—	—	—
Episode 1 (Monday, 31 January)	9	Caitlin & Tim	23 & 52	"Shallow"	✔	✔	✔	✔
Episode 2 (Tuesday, 1 February)	1	Jess & Kelsi	13 & 25	"Diamonds"	✔	✔	Team full	✔
Episode 2 (Tuesday, 1 February)	2	Castlereagh Connection	9–12	"Stand by Me"	—	Team full	Team full	—
Episode 2 (Tuesday, 1 February)	3	Kids of Leo	10–46	"Can't Take My Eyes Off You"	—	Team full	Team full	✔
Episode 2 (Tuesday, 1 February)	4	The O'Donnells	3–59	"The Edge of Glory"	✔	Team full	Team full	Team full

=== Battles ===
The Battles premiered at the second half of the second episode. The coaches gave their two groups different songs to sing in the battles. The coaches then had to choose one of their two groups to send through to the Grand Finals.

Color key
– Contestant wins battle round and advances to the Grand Finals
– Contestant loses battle round and is eliminated

Battle Results
Episode	Order	Coach	Winner		Loser	
Episode	Order	Coach	Artist	Song	Artist	Song
Episode 2 (Tuesday, 1 February)	1	Guy	The Wenas	"I'll Be There"	Kids Of Leo	"Stereo Hearts"
Episode 2 (Tuesday, 1 February)	2	Keith	Ty and Eddie	"Are You Gonna Be My Girl"	The O'Donnells	"Wrecking Ball"
Episode 2 (Tuesday, 1 February)	3	Jess	Jess and Kelsi	"What About Us"	Bloom and James	"What's Love Got to Do with It"
Episode 2 (Tuesday, 1 February)	4	Rita	Caitlin and Tim	"Say Something"	Micah and Maurice	"Don't Start Now"

=== Grand Finals ===
The Grand Finals was aired on 2 February, with each group performing a song. This is the only episode where the results were determined by the public and not the coaches. Caitlin and Tim were announced as the first winners of The Voice Generations, marking Rita Ora's first win on The Voice.

Grand Final results
Coach	Order	Artist	Song	Result
Keith Urban	1	Ty and Eddie	"Beggin'"	Finalist
Guy Sebastian	2	The Wenas	"Cloudy Day"	Finalist
Jessica Mauboy	3	Jess and Kelsi	"Daisies"	Finalist
Rita Ora	4	Caitlin and Tim	"Alive"	Winner

=== Ratings ===
Episode		Original airdate	Timeslot	Total Metro Viewers	Night Rank	Source
1	"The Blind Auditions"	31 January 2022	Monday 7:30 pm	586,000	11	
2	"The Battles"	1 February 2022	Tuesday 7:30 pm	565,000	9	
3	"The Grand Finale"	2 February 2022	Wednesday 7:30 pm	535,000	10	

== International franchises ==
Various international television networks have licensed or indicated interest in the format.

- Lithuania — In 2021, LNK announced that the series would air in 2022. Although the series was created on Australia, the Lithuanian version aired first, in January 2022. In November 2021, it was announced that 69 Danguje, Benas Aleksandravičius, Vaidas Baumila, and Ieva Prudnikovaitė were the coaches for the first edition. In June 2023, a second series was announced.
- Portugal – RTP1 announced, in 2022, that the series was in the works under the name of The Voice Gerações. The show premiered on 7 August 2022, with Bárbara Bandeira, Mickael Carreira, Simone de Oliveira, and Anselmo Ralph serving as coaches in the first edition of the show.
- Peru – In 2022, aside from the three previous formats of Peruvian La Voz, Latina Televisión announced that a series, under La Voz Generaciones, was in the works. Eva Ayllón, Christian Yaipén and the mother-son duo Mimy and Tony Succar were revealed as coaches. The show aired in December 2022.
- Philippines – On 6 January 2023, GMA Network announced that the generations series is airing on the network. It is the first country in Asia to adapt the format. The show premiered on 27 August 2023 with Billy Crawford, Chito Miranda, Julie Anne San Jose, and Stell of SB19 serving as coaches.

== See also ==
- List of Australian music television shows
- The Voice (franchise)
- List of Australian television series
- List of programs broadcast by Seven Network
