= 1Z Entertainment =

Philippine entertainment company

- Logo used since October 2023
- Type: Private
- Industry: Music; Entertainment
- Genre: Various
- Founded: August 3, 2022; 4 years ago
- Founder: Josh Cullen Santos; John Paulo Nase; Stell Ajero; Felip Jhon Suson; Justin de Dios
- Headquarters: Quezon City, Philippines
- Area served: Philippines
- Key people: John Paulo Nase (President); Julian De Dios (CEO); Celine Ferros (GM); Leah Gonzales (A&R director)
- Services: Music production, publishing, new artist development, and artist management; Event organization, and content creation
- Website: 1zentertainment.ph

Onez Entertainment Corp., doing business as 1Z Entertainment, is a Philippine multimedia entertainment and talent management company established by the Filipino boy band SB19. Headquartered in Quezon City, Philippines, the company operates as a full-service creative and management agency, overseeing music production, artist management, content creation, branding, and live event production.

== History ==
1Z Entertainment was incorporated on August 3, 2022. The members of SB19, Pablo, Josh, Stell, Ken, and Justin founded the company. Pablo, the group's leader, also served as the first CEO of the company.

1Z Entertainment's first production was the music video for the SB19 song "WYAT (Where You At)" that premiered on September 2, 2022.

On June 10, 2024, 1Z Entertainment announced an open search for its first P-pop girl group.

On January 9, 2025, 1Z opened its trainee auditions for 2026. They stated that it welcomes applicants who are dancers, singers, rappers, or visual artists adding that it aims to nurture talent and foster creativity.

On April 18, 2026, 1Z launched its first girl group, Xonara, during SB19's Wakas at Simula: The Trilogy Finale concert. The seven-member group performed their self-composed track "Tabi", which was later released on May 15.

== Partnerships ==
- Sony Music Philippines
- Live Nation Entertainment

== Artists ==
=== Groups ===
- SB19
- Xonara

=== Soloists ===
- J2X

== Filmography ==
=== Documentary ===
- Pagtatag! The Documentary (2024) (with First Light Studios).

== Concerts and festivals ==
Date	Name	Venue	Ref.
June 24, 2023 – May 19, 2024	Pagtatag! World Tour	5 countries	
May 31, 2025 – December 14, 2025	Simula at Wakas World Tour	12 countries	
October 24, 2026 – October 25, 2026	2026 One Zone Fest	Smart Araneta Coliseum	
