= Bakunawa =

Philippine mythological dragon

Creature information
- Grouping: Sea Serpent
- Similar entities: Sea serpent Phaya Naga; Nāga; Dragon (Asian)

Origin
- Region: Visayan islands; Bicol Region of the Philippines

The Bakunawa, also called the Philippine moon-eating dragon, the Philippine moon dragon, moon dragon, or the moon-eating dragon, is a dragon-like serpent in Philippine mythology that causes several natural phenomena, primarily eclipses. The movements of the Bakunawa served as a geomantic calendar system for ancient Filipinos and were part of the rituals of the babaylan priestess. It is usually depicted with a characteristic looped tail and a single horn on the nose. It was believed to inhabit either the sky or the underworld.

Due to increasing trade contacts with South Asia and the Indianization of Southeast Asia, the Bakunawa later became syncretized with the Nāga, Rahu, and Ketu of Hindu-Buddhist mythology.

== Etymology ==
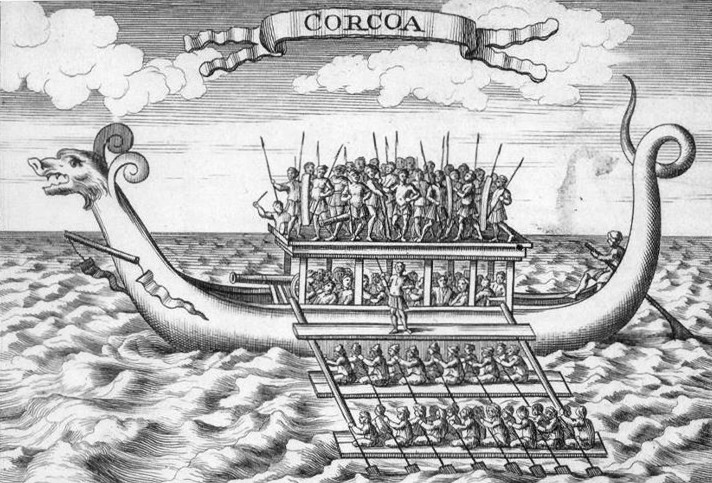
18th-century engraving of a karakoa warship with a Bakunawa design

Bakunawa is believed to be originally a compound word meaning "bent snake", from Proto-Western-Malayo-Polynesian *ba(ŋ)kuq ("bent", "curved") and *sawa ("large snake", "python"). Spelling variants include Vakonawa, Baconaua, or Bakonaua.

== Historical accounts ==
"No. 42. When the moon is eclipsed, the Indians of various districts generally go out into the street or into the open fields, with bells, panastanes, etc. They strike them with great force and violence in order that they might thereby protect the moon which they say is being eaten or swallowed by the dragon, tiger, or crocodile. And the worst thing is that if they wish to say "the eclipse of the moon" it is very common in the Philippines to use this locution, saying "the dragon, tiger, or crocodile is swallowing the moon." The Tagalogs also make use of it and say, Linamon [ni] laho [ang] buwan [trans.: "Laho swallowed the moon"]."

Fr. Tomas Ortiz, Practica del Ministerio (1731) via Zuniga's Estadismo (1893)

== Related myths ==
The Bakunawa is also sometimes known as Naga, from syncretization with the Hindu-Buddhist serpent deity, Nāga. It was also syncretized with the Hindu-Buddhist navagraha pair, Rahu and Ketu, deities who were responsible for eclipses of the sun and moon, respectively.

Versions of the Bakunawa also existed in other myths in the Philippines, sharing the common theme of being the cause of eclipses. The most similar to the Bakunawa is the Tagalog Laho (derived from Rahu; also known as Nono or Buaya), a serpent-like dragon that causes moon eclipses. In Kapampangan mythology, Láwû is depicted as a bird-like dragon or serpent that causes both solar and lunar eclipses, however, its features are closer to the demon Rahu. Both the words laho and láwû mean "eclipse" (also in modern parlance "to disappear" or "to vanish") in the Tagalog and Kapampangan language.

Other mythical creatures related to the Bakunawa include the Hiligaynon Bawa, Bauta, or Olimaw; the Mandaya and Manobo Tambanakua; the Bagobo Minokawa; and the Maranao Arimaonga. However, these do not always appear serpent-like. The Maranao Arimaonga for example, is portrayed as a lion-like dragon; while the Hiligaynon Olimaw is a winged serpent; the Bagobo Minokawa is a dragon-like giant bird; and the Mandaya Tambanokano and Manobo Tambanakua is a giant crab (sometimes also a giant tarantula or scorpion).

== Mythology ==
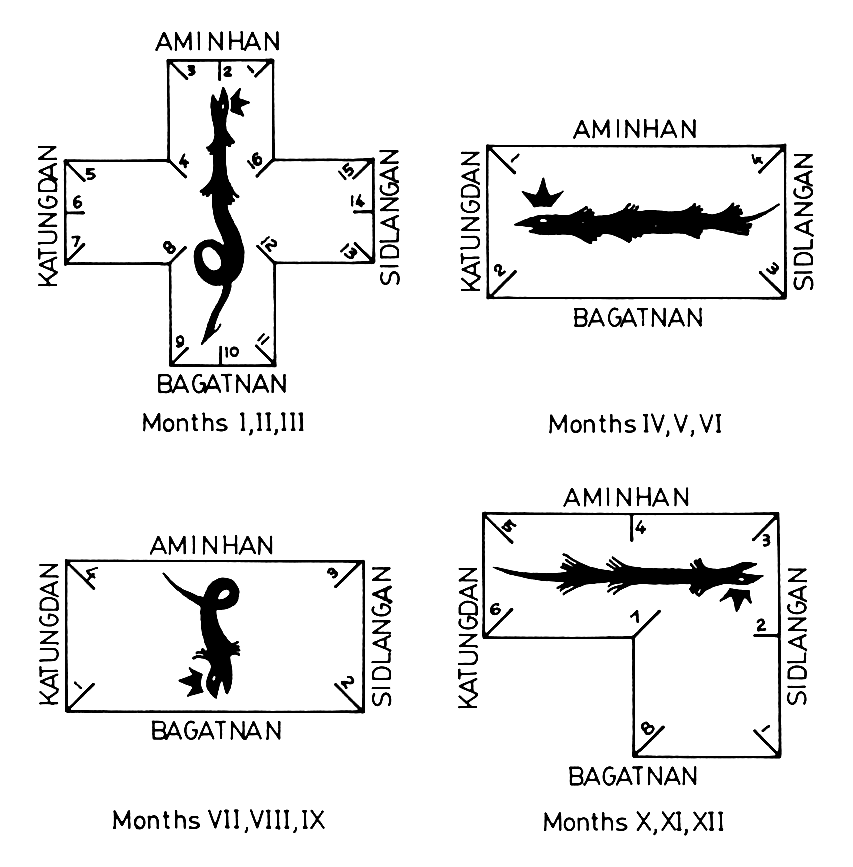
The rotation of the Bakunawa in a year, as explained in Mansueto Porras' Signosan (1919). This served prominently as a geomantic calendar system for ancient Filipinos, and were part of the divination rituals of babaylan shamans.

=== Cebuano mythology ===
According to tales, the Bakunawa is believed to be the cause of eclipses. During ancient times, pre-colonial Cebuanos believed that their supreme god—Bathala, or Kaptan the Visayan tradition—created 7 moons to illuminate the night sky. The Bakunawa, amazed by their beauty, would rise from the ocean and swallow the moons whole, angering Bathala and causing them to be mortal enemies.

To prevent the complete devouring of the moons, early Filipinos would rush outdoors, clanging pots and pans to startle the Bakunawa into disgorging the moons. In some accounts, musical instruments were used to produce soothing sounds meant to lull the creature into sleep, allowing brave villagers an opportunity to drive it away. The Bakunawa is traditionally described not only as a “moon eater” but also as a fearsome being known to consume humans.

The Bakunawa is said to have a sister in the form of a sea turtle. This turtle would reportedly travel to an island in the Philippines to lay its eggs. However, locals observed that each time the turtle came ashore, the surrounding waters encroached further inland, reducing the island's size. Fearing the eventual loss of their land, the locals killed the turtle. Upon learning of its sister’s death, the Bakunawa emerged from the sea and consumed the moon. In response, the people sought intervention from a supreme deity, who declined to punish the creature directly but instructed the people to create loud noises by striking pots and pans to force the Bakunawa to release the moon. The tale comes to an end when the moon is successfully driven away, causing the Bakunawa to disappear from the story.

Another version tells of the Bakunawa falling in love with a human woman from a local tribe. When the tribal leader discovered their relationship, he ordered their dwelling to be destroyed by fire. Enraged by the loss, the Bakunawa attempted to devour all seven moons as an act of vengeance. When it was about to consume the final moon, the deity intervened, punishing the creature by banishing it from the sea. In this version, eclipses are interpreted as the Bakunawa’s attempts to return to its home and reunite with its lost family.

Some oral traditions describe the Bakunawa as a mobile landmass with communities living on its back. Within these beliefs, two variants of the creature are distinguished: the flying Bakunawa and the terrestrial, or land-based, Bakunawa.

=== West Visayan mythology ===
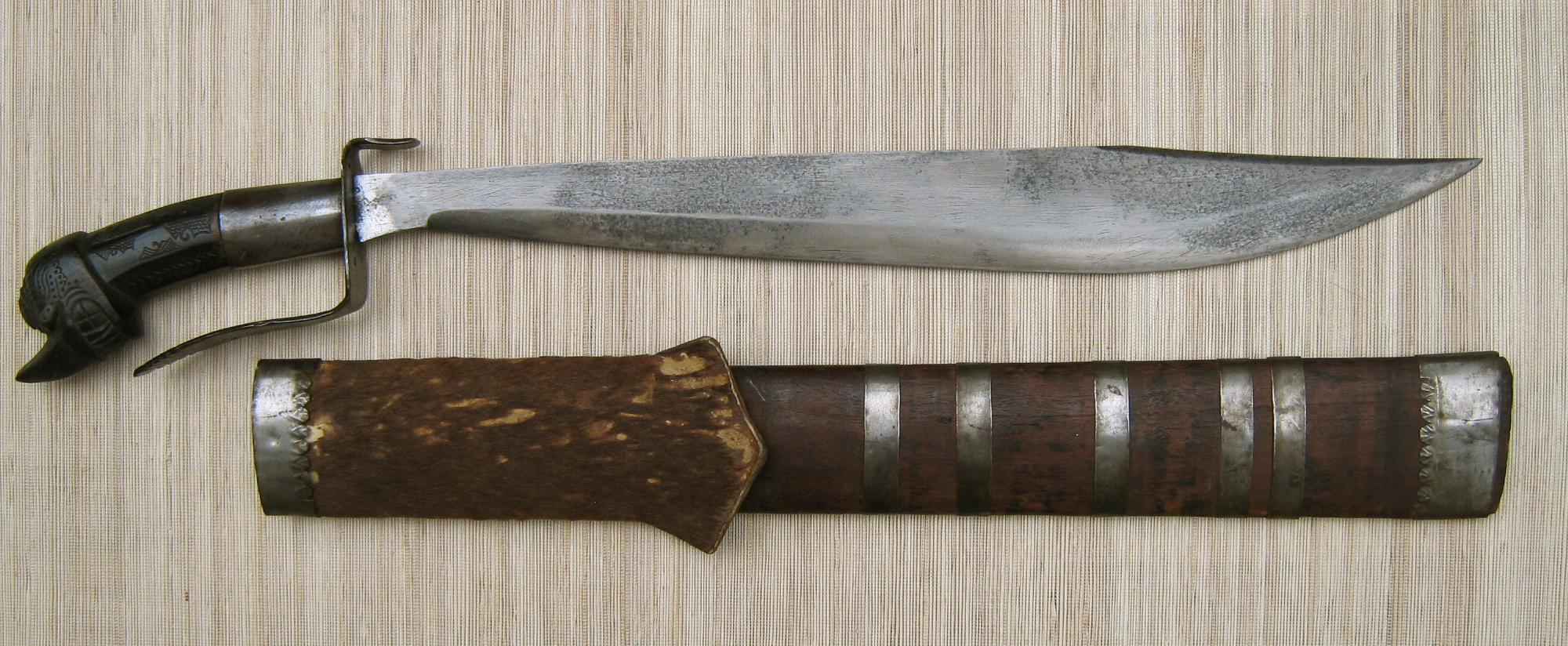
A tenegre sword from Panay with a Bakunawa head hilt

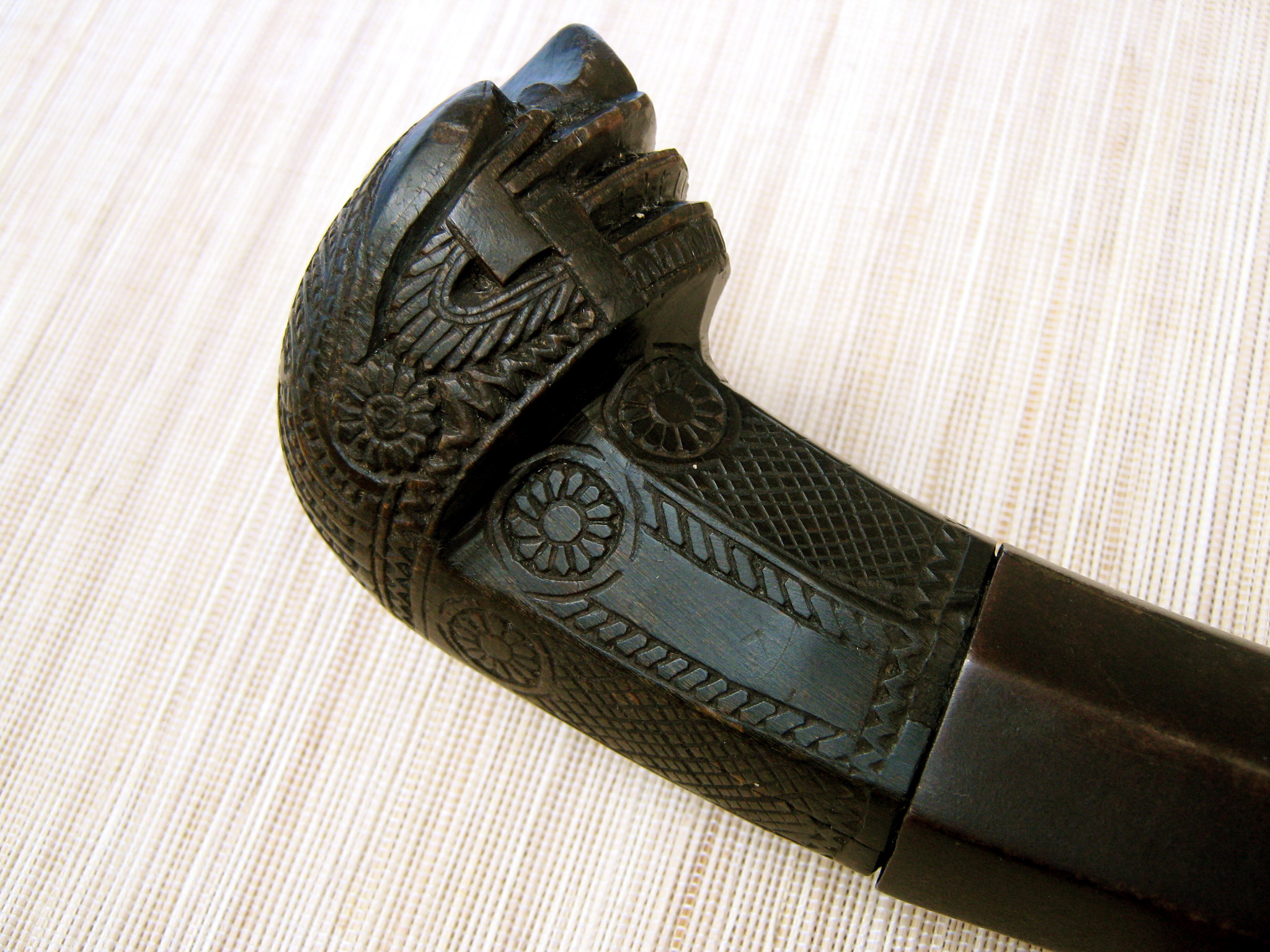
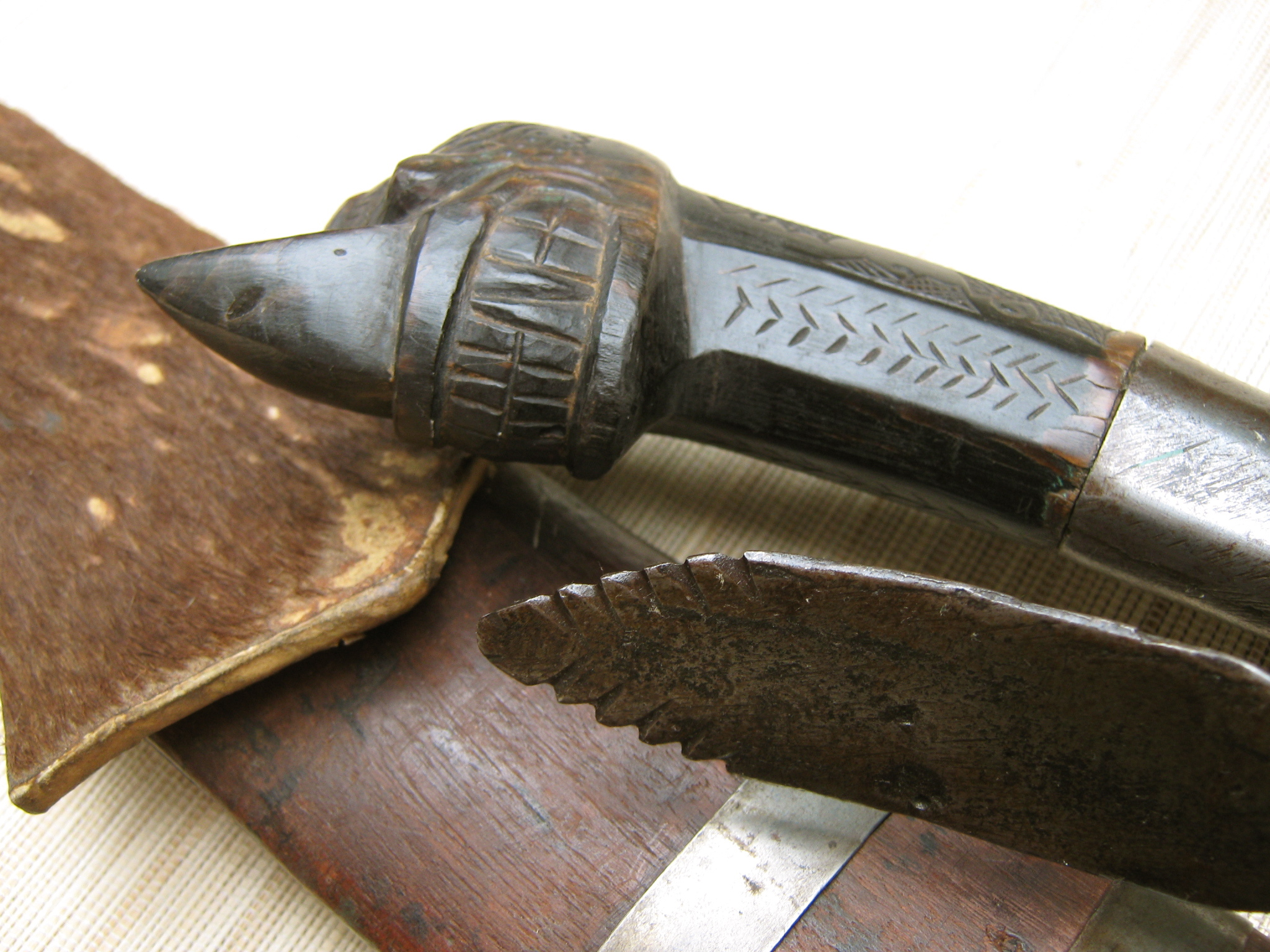
Bakunawa pommels from Visayan tenegre swords

The story of the Bakunawa and the Seven Moons was first documented in Mga Sugilanong Karaan (1913) by Buyser. It later gained broader recognition when it was included in the 1926 compilation Mga Sugilanong Pilipinhon (Folk Lore Filipino), where Buyser concluded with an account of his personal encounter with beliefs surrounding the Bakunawa.

In this version of the myth, the supreme deity Bathala is said to have created seven moons, each intended to illuminate one night of the week. These celestial bodies were believed to bring great beauty and radiance to the night sky. However, this celestial harmony was disrupted by the appearance of a colossal serpent-like creature, the Bakunawa, which was said to have coiled itself around the earth. Drawing comparisons to the apocalyptic serpent described by Saint John in the Apocalipsis, the Bakunawa, driven by envy, consumed six of the moons, leaving only one remaining. In response, Bathala is said to have planted bamboo on the last moon. These markings, visible from Earth, were thought to be the dark patches or "stains" seen on the lunar surface.

Following the loss of six moons, communities took measures to safeguard the final remaining moon from being consumed by the Bakunawa. According to the account, widespread panic ensued one night when the Bakunawa reappeared and appeared to attack the moon. Inhabitants reacted by producing loud noises—striking drums, metal objects, and other instruments—to deter the serpent. People reportedly cried out phrases such as “return our moon,” fearing that the loss of the last moon would signal a catastrophic end. Gathering outside their homes, many knelt in prayer to seek divine intervention. The Bakunawa was eventually believed to have regurgitated the moon, prompting widespread relief and expressions of gratitude directed toward a higher power.

The joy of the people at the return of the Moon could not be described that night. They lifted their hearts to the sky like flowers and uttered their praises of gratefulness to the Almighty who owned all creations.

Despite scientific explanations for lunar eclipses becoming more widely understood, belief in the Bakunawa persisted in some regions. In particular, communities in mountainous and coastal areas were said to continue traditional practices—such as creating loud noises—during eclipses, as observed during more recent astronomical events.

This cultural motif is referenced in the proverb “The footprint of the old people never disappears,” symbolizing the lasting influence of ancestral traditions.

The tale was later reinterpreted by Damiana Eugenio in her 2001 anthology Philippine Folk Literature: The Myths, published by the University of the Philippines Press.

== Literature ==
There is a short Hiligaynon song in 3/4 time that children used to sing during lunar eclipses:

Ang bulan namon sang una, sang una	Our moon long ago, long ago
Guin ka-on sang bakunawa	Was eaten by the bakunawa
Malo-oy ka man, i-uli, i-uli	Please have pity, return it, return it
Korona sang amon hari.	The crown of our king.

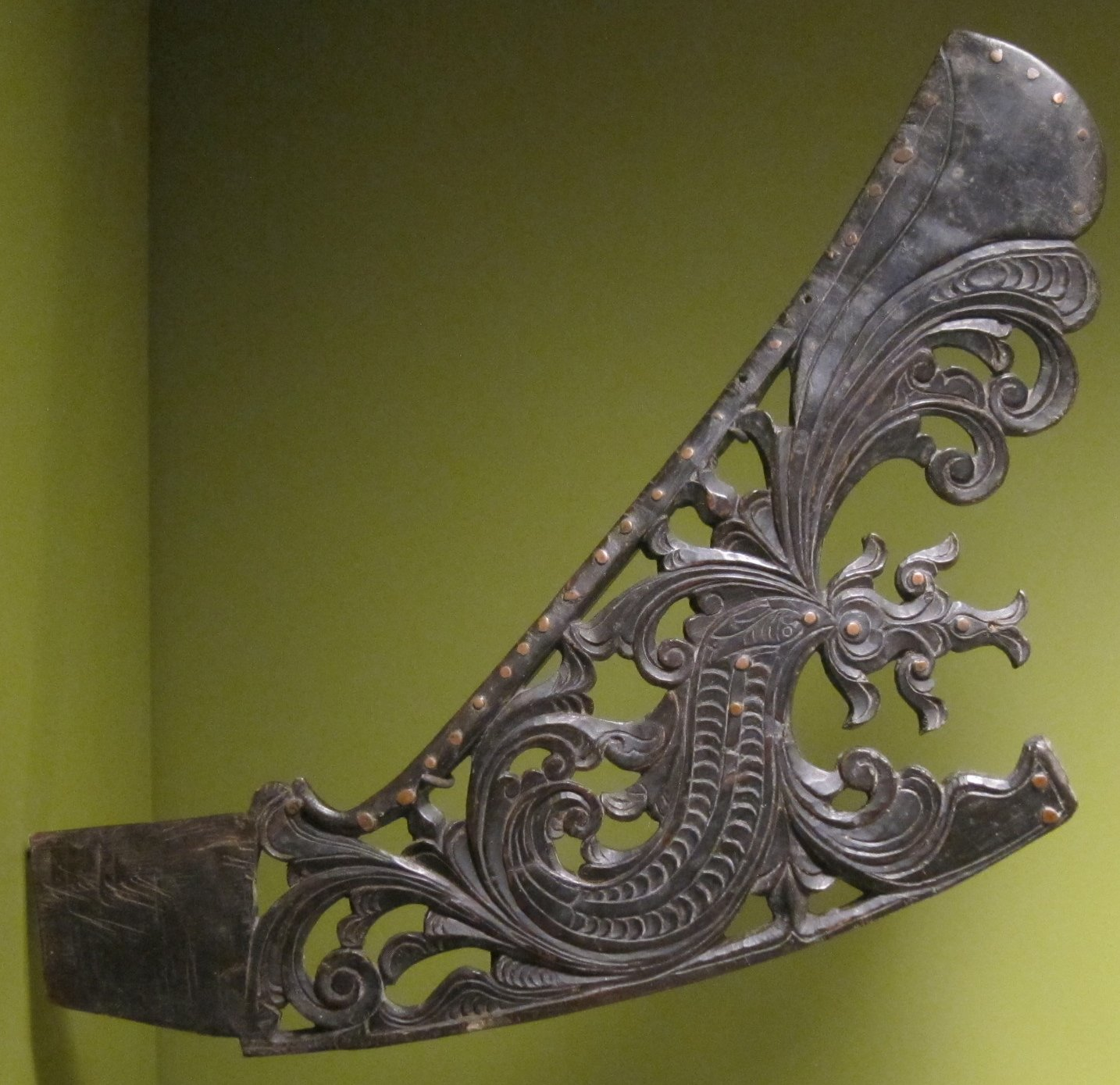
A Maranao kubing jaw harp handle made from horn and brass in the elaborate okir Maranao art tradition with an S-shaped naga design and a fish

== Traditional art ==
Figures of the Bakunawa's head decorate the hilts of many ancient Filipino swords. These swords that originate in Panay are said to bestow upon the hangaway or mandirigma (sacred warriors) the fearful presence and power of the Bakunawa (or whatever deity/animal they have on their deity hilt) when they wield their swords in combat.

== Games ==
A children's game called Bulan Bulan, Buwan Buwan, or Bakunawa is played in the Philippines. It has 6–8 players arranged in a circle.

A player acts as the buwan/bulan (moon) while another player acts as the Bakunawa (eclipse), chosen either through Jack-en-poy, “maalis taya”, or “maiba taya.” The other participants stand in a circle facing the center and holding each other's hands. The buwan/bulan stands inside the circle, while the Bakunawa stands outside.

=== Objective ===
The object of the game is for the Bakunawa to tag or touch the buwan/bulan. The rest of the players try to prevent the bakunawa from doing so by holding on to each other and running around the circle as fast as they can while not letting go of the ones next to them.

For the Bakunawa to get into the circle, he or she asks one of the players, "What chain is this?" and when the player replies, "This is an iron chain," the Bakunawa should ask another player because an iron chain is supposed to be unbreakable. A player who wants to let the bakunawa in can say, "This is an abaca chain," and should let go of his or her hold. This is usually done when the player playing as the bakunawa is tired from running around.

The malatikantumanlak can also try to get in by going under the linked hands. If the player chosen as the bakunawa is fast and small enough, this can be done easily. As soon as the bakunawa succeeds in getting in, the players forming the circle should let the buwan out of the circle.

The Bakunawa then tries to break out of the linked hands to try to get out to catch the buwan/bulan. When the Bakunawa succeeds in catching the buwan/bulan, they exchange places, or if both of them are too tired, another pair from the circle of players is chosen as the new Bakunawa and buwan/bulan.

== In modern culture ==
On August 9, 1974, the opera The Legend of Bakunawa held its world premiere in Maasin, Southern Leyte. Its librettist and composer Angel Beaunoni "Noni" Espina, a singer and ethnomusicologist, sang the lead baritone role of Tugas, while Norma Palermo Espina conducted the opera.

- In the massively multiplayer online role-playing game Ragnarok Online, Bakunawa/Bakonawa is one of the Special MVP Monsters on the game.
- In the 2015 GMA Network anthology drama Alamat, Bakunawa is voiced by Tonipet Gaba in the episode: "Ang Bakunawa at ang Pitong Buwan."
- In the 2016 mobile game EverWing, Bakunawa is one of the unlockable dragon sidekicks.
- In the 2021 GMA Network fantasy series Agimat ng Agila, the "mata ng bakunawa" (lit. 'eye of bakunawa') is a mystical object of evil.
- Felip's 2022 song Bulan and its music video are inspired by the Bakunawa myth, treating the dragon's attempts to swallow the light as a metaphor for crab mentality.
- The Bakunawa is a superweapon used by the main antagonist, Merga, in the 2022 video game, Freedom Planet 2, along with other creatures derived from Philippine culture.
- The Ion Dragon seen in the 2023 Apple+ television series Monarch: Legacy of Monsters was identified as Titanus Bakunawa in The Monarch Files: A Monsterverse Manual.
- "Bakunawa" is the song title of the winning entry of the 2025 Tiny Desk Contest of NPR Music. The song is performed by rapper Ruby Ibarra and a multi-generational Filipino-American band, including rock guitarist June Millington.
- The Bakunawa is the central subject of the song "The Great Bakunawa" by American artist Quadeca, featuring Danny Brown, from his 2025 album Vanisher, Horizon Scraper. Danny Brown, who is of part Filipino descent, delivers a verse from the perspective of the Bakunawa itself. The lyrics vividly portray the creature's immense power, insatiable hunger, and role in causing celestial phenomena like eclipses, while also referencing the traditional belief that music can lull the creature into sleep.
- Six Flags Great Adventure, a theme park in New Jersey, U.S., will open a roller coaster named Bakunawa in 2027.

== See also ==
- Batangas
- Coi Coi-Vilu
- Horned Serpent
- Jormugandr
- Leviathan
- Makara
