= Xonara =

Filipino girl group

- Xonara in September 2026

Background information
- Origin: Manila, Philippines
- Genre: P-pop
- Years active: 2026–present
- Labels: 1Z; Republic Philippines; UMG Philippines
- Members: Eurekah; Ella; Dominique; Tin; Megumi; Lei; Namie

Xonara (stylized in all caps) is a Filipino girl group formed in 2024 by 1Z Entertainment. The group is composed of seven members: Eurekah, Ella, Dominique, Tin, Megumi, Lei, and Namie.

The group officially debuted on May 15, 2026, and is the first girl group under 1Z Entertainment.

== History ==
=== Formation and development (2024–2025) ===
The formation of Xonara began in 2024 when 1Z Entertainment initiated auditions and talent searches to develop its first girl group. The project formed part of the company's expansion of its artists roster and contributed to the growth of Filipino pop music locally and internationally.

=== Introduction and debut (2026–present) ===
The seven-member group first gained public attention after performing on April 18, 2026, at SB19's Wakas at Simula: Trilogy Concert with their debut single "Tabi", which was described as pop, rock, and hip-hop, at the SMDC Festival Grounds in Parañaque. They also appeared at the Aurora Music Festival 2026 prior to debut.

Xonara officially debuted on May 15, 2026, with the release of their first single, "Tabi", under 1Z Entertainment, in partnership with UMG Philippines and Republic Records. The group officially launched their debut era through an event titled Xonara's World, held a day later along Escolta Street in Manila. The launch event featured live performances, fan interactions, and promotional activities connected to the release of "Tabi".

In June 2026, Xonara was recognized as part of the Billboard Philippines: P-pop Class of 2026.

== Public image ==
In November 2026, Xonara became an ambassador for the clothing brand Oxgn (stylized in all caps), first appearing in the brand's holiday campaign alongside the boy band Alamat.

== Members ==
- Eurekah
- Ella
- Dominique
- Tin
- Megumi
- Lei
- Namie

== Discography ==
=== Singles ===
List of singles, showing year released, selected chart positions, and associated albums
| Title | Year | Peak chart positions | Album | Ref. |
| Title | Year | PHL (Note: Peak chart positions for songs on the Philippines Hot 100 charts) | Album | Ref. |
|---|---|---|---|---|
| "Tabi" | 2026 | — | Non-album single | |
| "Pula" | 2026 | — | | |
| "Imperfect" | 2026 | TBA | | |
