= Felip (musician) =

Filipino singer-songwriter, dancer (born 1997)

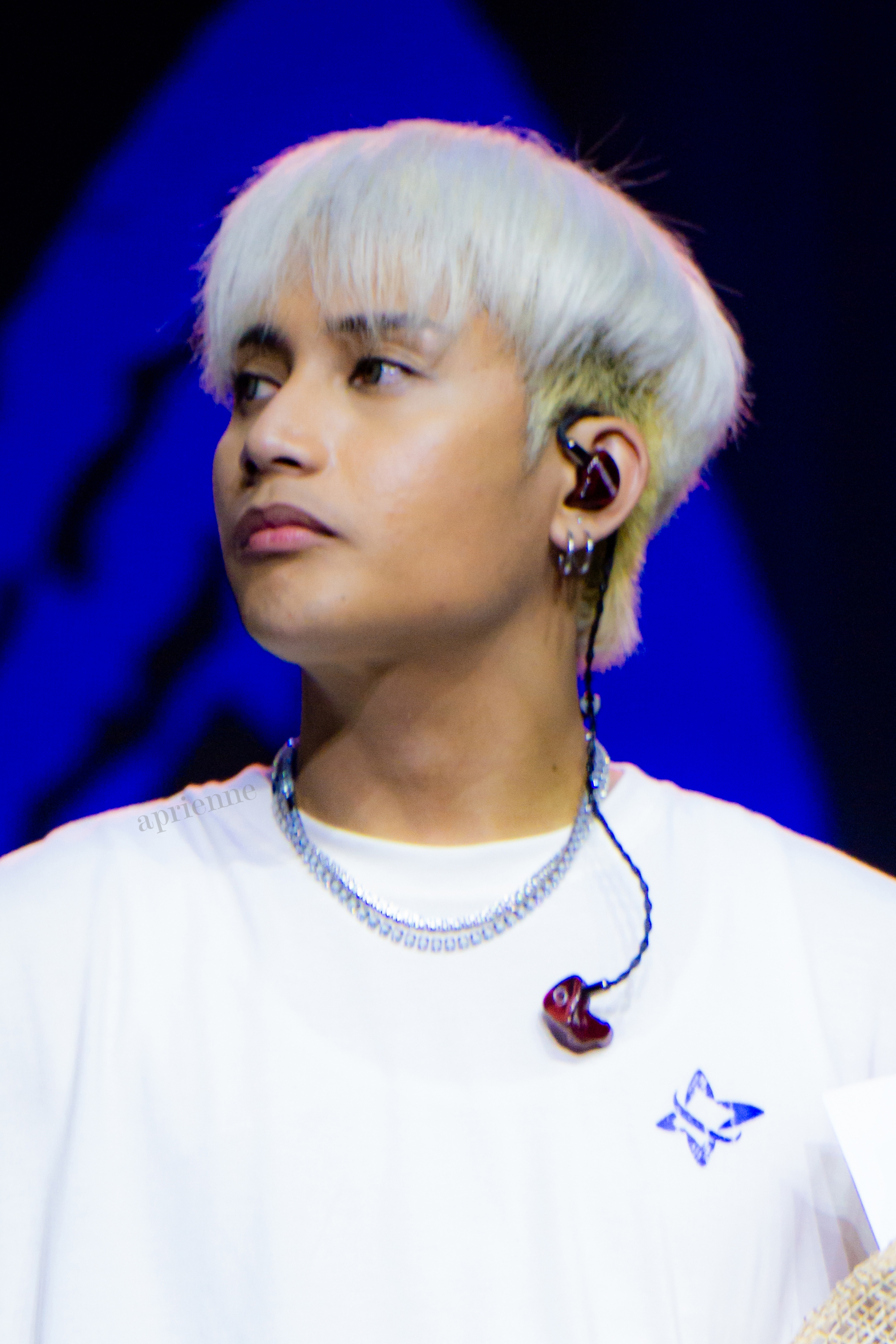
- Felip in 2023
- Born: Felip Jhon Suson; January 12, 1997 (age 29); Pagadian, Zamboanga del Sur, Philippines
- Other name: Ken
- Education: Technological Institute of the Philippines
- Occupations: Rapper; singer-songwriter; dancer; producer; composer; entrepreneur
- Years active: 2018–present
- Musical career
- Genres: P-pop; R&B; hip hop; rock; Visayan pop
- Instruments: Vocals; guitar
- Labels: 1Z; ShowBT; Sony; Warner
- Member of: SB19

Felip Jhon Suson (born January 12, 1997), known professionally as Felip and as Ken in his role as a member of P-pop group SB19, is a Filipino singer, songwriter, rapper, dancer and entrepreneur. As Ken, he is the main dancer and lead singer of the Filipino boy band SB19 managed under 1Z Entertainment.

Felip made his solo debut with "Palayo" (2021), a slow R&B track, which was followed by the single "Bulan" (2022). He released his first extended play COM•PLEX in 2023 and his first full album 7sins in 2024. Honouring his roots as a Cebuano speaker from Zamboanga del Sur, Felip has performed in Cebuano in addition to Filipino and English. Although Felip is known for his distinctively deep voice, he has displayed a wide vocal range and is noted for his versatility and experimental sound.

== Early life and education ==
Felip Jhon Suson was born on January 12, 1997, in Pagadian, Zamboanga del Sur. He has Bisaya roots. He was raised by his grandparents in Lakewood, Zamboanga del Sur. Felip’s father and grandfather are pastors, and their love for gospel music inspired his own passion for music. The influence of his uncle, who plays many musical instruments, led him to learn how to play several instruments early in life. He started dancing when he needed to for a school project aside from being a varsity player in sepak takraw. Felip joined some hiphop dance groups during high school. He attended Cagayan de Oro College and studied architecture before his musical career began. After joining the band, he transferred to the Technological Institute of the Philippines.

== Career ==
=== 2018–present: SB19 ===
ShowBT Philippines, a subsidiary of Korean company ShowBT, conducted a talent search which would ultimately lead to the formation of the band SB19. Two weeks after Felip sent his video audition, he was invited to train in Manila. He dropped out of school and left his hometown, which his parents initially disapproved of. "It was a difficult decision", he later told the South China Morning Post, "but I had to do it because dancing is what I really love".

The five members of SB19 were selected in 2016, having undergone grueling daily training at a training camp. Their act largely took inspiration from K-pop. Felip debuted as Ken, the band's main dancer, lead vocalist, and rapper, in October 2018. That year, SB19 released their debut single, "Tilaluha" (lit. 'tearful'), followed by "Go Up". SB19's leader, Sejun (now Pablo), said that the band had begun to grow disheartened after training so long, but receiving little attention. The group had already considered to disband, but their dance practice video for their song, "Go Up", went viral in 2019, leading Sejun to call it their "redemption song". SB19 released a third single, "Alab (Burning)", before their debut studio album Get in the Zone came out on July 31, 2020. Containing their previous three singles, Get in the Zone was highly anticipated by their newly developed fanbase, which was dubbed A'TIN (pronounced 'eighteen').

On May 19, 2023, SB19 released "Gento", the lead single off their second EP Pagtatag! (transl. strengthening). The song was a commercial success, while its popularity on TikTok helped introduce SB19 to viewers in other countries, such as the United States. Pagtatag! was released on June 9. That month, SB19 became self-managed after they established the company 1Z Entertainment.

With the successful release of Pagtatag!, the group further solidified their presence in the Philippine pop music scene. The Philippine Daily Inquirer later wrote that SB19 became the leaders of the Pinoy pop (P-pop) industry.

On January 31, 2025, SB19 released a teaser of their new EP Simula at Wakas. "Dam," the first single from the EP, was released on February 28, 2025 while the EP itself was released on April 25, 2025. Billboard then exclusively revealed plans for SB19's Simula at Wakas World Tour, which kicked off at the Philippine Arena on May 31, 2025.

=== 2021–2022: Solo singles ===
In April 2021, SB19 became the first Filipino act to be nominated for a Billboard Music Award when they became a contender for the fan-voted category Top Social Artist. Around the same time, Felip was visiting his hometown after his grandmother died. On July 22, 2021, the band released their first extended play (EP) Pagsibol (lit. 'sprouting'). SB19 began August with the online concert Back in the Zone. During the concert, Felip debuted the original song "Palayo" (lit. 'away') in a solo performance. His outfit, a red lace top paired with high-rise pants, drew attention on social media.

In August, Felip featured on a remix of Filipino rapper Matthaios' song "Pangga" (lit. 'love'). On September 18, Felip officially released "Palayo" as his debut solo single, alongside the music video. He wrote and composed the slow R&B track—a departure from SB19's energetic pop style—about someone walking away from a relationship, with lyrics in Cebuano, Filipino, and English. Using the mononym Felip for his solo projects, Felip was the first SB19 member to start a solo career. His fans were dubbed sisiws (lit. 'chicks'). On November 26, Felip launched his clothing line Superior Son, which promptly sold out.

On May 28, 2022, Felip released the single "Bulan", along with the music video. The song was written by Felip, who composed the melody, and described by GMA News' Shia Lagarde as having a "more experimental and aggressive sound", influenced by rock and hip-hop, than "Palayo". Both the song and the music video were inspired by Philippine mythology; he used the story of Bulan, Haliya, and the Bakunawa as a metaphor for crab mentality. The single's melody and chants were inspired by indigenous ritual music. In November 2022, Felip was named "Breakthrough Artist of the Year" at the 8th Wish 107.5 Music Awards.

=== 2023: COM•PLEX ===
Felip began his production for his debut solo EP while he was on the WYAT (Where You At) Tour, SB19's first world tour, in late 2022; he wrote some of the lyrics during flights. Felip released the lead single "Rocksta" on January 19, 2023, along with its black-and-white music video. On February 3, his debut EP Complex was released under Warner Music Philippines. A six-track hip-hop record, it has a heavy composition and takes inspiration from hip-hop and rock. Felip described Complex as "a play on the many meanings of the word complex" and more confident and musically experimental. It has lyrics in English and Cebuano. Journalists described the EP as autobiographical and unapologetic. On February 10, he released the music video for the EP's closing song "Straydogs", which was filmed in Japan. Felip later did live performances of the EP's songs called "Superior Sessions Live".

On September 12, Felip performed at Music Matters Live 2023 in Singapore, marking his first solo performance at an international music festival. The following day, he then did a solo show in Clarke Quay.

On November 8, Felip released his rendition of Never the Strangers’ “Moving Closer” as part of ‘The Classic Cover’ series in celebration of Warner Music Philippines’ 30th anniversary.

On December 20, Felip joined Aegis and Jose Mari Chan for a holiday-themed concert. One of the producers explained that he was a unanimous pick because “he is from Cagayan De Oro (CDO), and his music resonates with AEGIS on a personal level”.

On December 22, Felip released an unannounced single entitled “Kanako”, which is a departure from his signature rap style, and features a primarily rock sound with lyrics in both Cebuano and English. The song went on to reach #1 on the iTunes Philippines chart less than 12 hours after its release.

=== 2024: Collaborations and 7sins ===
On January 5, Felip announced a performance at 12 Monkeys Music Hall & Pub with PLAYERTWO. He later teased a song collaboration with the 5-piece band to be released on January 19.

On January 13, Felip opened for the Asia Pacific Predator League 2024 Grand Finals. He also had a special collaboration with Ylona Garcia. In the same event, he closed the show with his group, SB19, alongside Philippines’ Popstar royalty, Sarah Geronimo.

On January 16, he held a birthday live performance at 12 Monkeys Music Hall & Pub and sang for the first time their highly anticipated collaborative single “FLYYY” with Playertwo. Beyond accidentally revealing the music video for “FLYYY”, the two acts also unveiled another joint track titled “Pagdali”, to be released at a later date. On January 21, two days after the digital release of the song, “FLYYY” music video was dropped. Later, he announced the release of their second collaborative single “Pagdali”. The song was released digitally midnight of February 2, and the music video soon followed at 8pm PHT.

On February 9, Felip headlined Lucky Chinatown Countdown to Chinese New Year. He also performed at the grand unmasking of Phirst Park Homes in Bacolod on February 17. Felip was also one of the performers of BingoPlus Share the Love Share the Luck on March 1.

On April 4, Felip dropped a pre-save link of a new single, “Fake Faces”. The song was released immediately that midnight (April 5), and the music video at 8pm PHT. "Fake Faces" was co-written with Grammy-nominated songwriter/producer Seann Bowe (Wiz Khalifa, All That Remains, The Veronicas), and produced by internationally-acclaimed producer Hyuk Shin, founder of the 153/Joombas Music Group. It marked a departure from the hip-hop sound that he debuted with in his EP, COMPLEX. Felip revealed he made a 2-day trip “to Malaysia to work on everything from the track to the music and lyric videos.”

On April 15, 2024, Felip graced the cover of Billboard Philippines’ Hip-hop Rookies of the Year issue. He was named one of the “8 rising artists who are determined to bring the genre from the streets to the rest of the world.”

In April, Felip teased a partnership with PUBG Mobile Philippines. The campaign spun a commercial, Superior Pass, where fans and players alike could collect his voice pack, a frame, and an avatar for free through certain missions and game live streams where he got to play with fans and players.

On May 10, 2024, Felip announced the forthcoming release of his debut solo full-length album entitled 7sins. On July 5, 2024, 7sins was released on digital streaming platforms. Felip described the nine-track album as a "journey of acknowledging human shortcomings," with the songs representing the seven deadly sins and the feelings and emotions associated with each sin. The album entered Billboard Japan's Top Albums and Hot Albums charts at #23 and #25, respectively.

To promote the album, Felip held his first solo headlining concert "7sins The Album Concert" on July 27, 2024 at SPACE at One Ayala Mall in Makati. Billboard Philippines praised Felip's ability to command the stage and also lauded the production design, writing that the concert's conceptual vision was "brilliantly brought to life through meticulous attention to detail," with each segment successfully capturing the atmosphere and mood associated with each sin.

On August 21, 2024, Felip released the music video for "envy," the album's title track. On the same day, he also released a Japan-exclusive physical CD of 7sins containing a bonus track entitled "tokyo." During the pre-order period in July, he became the first Filipino artist to secure the top spot of CDJapan's all-genre ranking in its 27-year history. The CD also topped amazon.com.jp's Hip-hop Category on the second day of pre-order. Upon its release, the physical CD promptly sold out at the Warner Music Japan store.

On August 30, 2024, Felip held a signing event at Tower Records Shibuya to promote 7sins ahead of his album concert in Tokyo. On September 2, 2024, the "7sins The Album Concert" was held at the Duo Music Exchange in Shibuya, Tokyo.

=== 2025-present: Solo activities and 7sins concert album ===
Amid SB19's major comeback in 2025, group activities took precedence, including another world tour to support their third EP, Simula At Wakas, which was released in April 2025. Despite this, Felip continued to fit in solo activities in between group schedules. On January 12 and 13, he performed at the D.U.N.K. (Dance Universe Never Killed) Showcase in Yokohama, Japan alongside Japanese acts such as Sky-Hi, Kaito Takahashi, Psychic Fever, &Team, Be:First, and Mazzel.

On February 14, 2025, Felip was featured on a remix of Japanese boy group ONEOREIGHT's single Kawasaki, along with Vietnamese-American singer Thủy.

As part of a brand collaboration with Closeup Philippines, new versions of Felip's cover of Never the Strangers’ “Moving Closer” were released: an R&B version "(Moving Closer - From the Cafe)" in February and a more upbeat version "(Moving Closer - From the Lounge)" in April.

To mark the anniversary of "7sins", Felip released "7sins the album concert (live)" across streaming platforms on September 16. The concert album, consisting of twelve tracks, features live recordings from his 7sins concert in Manila in July 2024.

On November 16, Felip received two awards at the 38th Awit Awards, winning the jury-based award for Best Vocal Arrangement for the 7sins track "ache" alongside co-producer Luke Gabriel Isnani (also known as Luke April), as well as the fan-voted People’s Voice Award for Favorite Solo Artist.

On November 26, Felip joined the lineup of performers at the final installment of the concert series We Play Here, presented as "We Play Here: The Final Act", where he performed select tracks from 7sins as well as his collaborations with fellow performer Playertwo.

On May 7, 2026, Felip announced his show, titled "Sulfur", on May 30 at Shooting Gallery Studios in Makati. He later released a single with the same name on May 22.

== Artistry ==
=== Influences ===
Felip is a fan of metal and rock bands such as IV of Spades, Slipknot, Korn, Metallica, FM Static, Sleeping with Sirens, and Paramore. He also likes hip-hop bands and, influenced by his religious upbringing, gospel bands. Felip's inspirations for "Bulan" included Post Malone, Lay Zhang, One Ok Rock and Jaden Smith. He cited hip-hop artists such as Al James, Kendrick Lamar, Travis Scott, Post Malone, Kid Cudi, and Lil Uzi Vert as inspirations for Complex. He has also cited BTS member RM and Exo's Kai as his favorite K-pop artists. He is also a fan of R&B music and singer Daniel Caesar.

=== Musical style ===
Each member of SB19 has distinct musical tastes and styles which they are able to showcase more fully in their solo work. Felip considers his solo work as a way to explore genres of music other than his band's P-pop, stating that his songs as Felip are more experimental. His deep bass voice, once a point of insecurity for him, now features heavily in both SB19's music and his solo projects. However, he is noted for possessing a wide vocal range, and being able to do falsetto. He considers his musical style to be "hip-hop metal rock" with R&B influences. After the release of Complex, HipHopDX Asia's MC Galang wrote that there was "no set precedent" for pop stars in the Philippine music industry successfully crossing over to another genre, like Felip has.

Felip, who speaks Cebuano, Filipino, and English, chose to highlight the Cebuano language in Complex, because Cebuano-language rap and artists have received less attention in the Philippines.

== Public image ==
Filipino magazines such as Nylon Manila have highlighted Felip's "experimental" fashion choices, writing that he blends menswear and womenswear together. He has been described as the most reserved member of SB19. NME's Tanu I. Raj, after interviewing the band, wrote that "Ken remains the tempered, silent pillar throughout, speaking only when the others prod him to, and only after glancing at them from the corner of his eye."

== Discography ==
=== Album ===
List of albums with selected details
Title	Album details	Peak chart positions
Title	Album details	JPN Hot
7sins	Released: July 5, 2024; Label: Warner Music Philippines; Track listing: # "Foes"; 1. "Envy"; 2. "Wrath"; 3. "Greed"; 4. "Pride"; 5. "Gluttony" (feat. Playertwo); 6. "Lust" (feat. Cyra Gwynth); 7. "Sloth"; 8. "Ache"	25
7sins: the album concert (live)	Released: September 16, 2025; Label: Warner Music Philippines; Track listing: # "to sin is human, to forgive is divine"; 1. "foes"; 2. "envy"; 3. "greed"; 4. "lust" (feat. Cyra Gwynth); 5. "pride"; 6. "gluttony" (feat. Playertwo); 7. "wrath"; 8. "tokyo"; 9. "sloth"; 10. "grace"; 11. "ache"	—

=== Extended plays ===
List of extended plays with selected details
Title	EP details
Complex	Released: February 3, 2023 (PH); Label: Warner Music Philippines; Format: digital download, streaming media; Track listing: 1. "Rocksta"; 2. "Superiority"; 3. "Mictest"; 4. "Drinksmoke"; 5. "Criminal"; 6. "Straydogs"

=== As lead artist ===
Title	Year	Album	Ref.
"Palayo"	2021	Non-album singles	
"Bulan"	2022	Non-album singles	
"Rocksta"	2023	Complex	
"Straydogs"	2023	Complex	
"Moving Closer"	2023	Non-album single	
"Kanako"	2023	Non-album single	
"Fake Faces"	2024	Non-album single	
"Envy"	2024	7sins	
"Moving Closer - From the Cafe"	2025	Non-album single	
"Moving Closer - From the Lounge"	2025	Non-album single	
"Sulfur"	2026	Non-album single	

=== As featured artist ===
Title	Year	Album
"Pangga (Remix)" (Matthaios featuring Felip, Michael Pacquiao & Soulthrll)	2021	Non-album singles
"Flyyy" (Playertwo featuring Felip)	2024	Non-album singles
"Pagdali" (Playertwo featuring Felip)	2024	Non-album singles
"ID" (Sky-Hi featuring Ryoki (Be:First), Ryuki (Mazzel), Jimmy (Psychic Fever from Exile Tribe) and Felip)	2025	Non-album singles
"Kawasaki" (One or Eight with Felip and thủy)	2025	Non-album singles

== Videography ==
=== Music videos ===
Year	Title	Director(s)	Ref.
2021	"Palayo"	Felip; Bea Laino; Chapters Ph	
2022	"Bulan"	Felip; Bea Laino; Chapters Ph	
2023	"Rocksta"	Felip	
2023	"Straydogs"	Felip; Bea Laino; Chapters Ph	
2023	"Kanako"	Felip	
2024	"Fake Faces"	John Karlo Calingao	
2024	"Envy"	Jay-Ar Villarojas of Kawingan Studios	

== Live performances ==
=== Concerts ===
==== Solo Concerts ====
Event	Date	Venue	Location	Guest Acts	Ref.
7sins Album Concert Manila	July 27, 2024	Space at One Ayala	Makati	PLAYERTWO · Cyra Gwynth	
7sins Album Concert Japan	September 2, 2024	Duo Music Exchange	Tokyo, Japan	N/A	

==== Joint Concerts ====
Event	Date	Venue	Location	Collaboration With	Ref.
Aquatic Beats	April 1, 2023	Aqua Planet	Mabalacat	MC Einstein·Quest	
PPOPCON	July 16, 2023	Araneta Coliseum	Quezon City	SB19·Alamat·BINI·Josh Cullen	
Winter Carnival	December 23, 2023	P7 Arena	Dubai	Bandang Lapis·Alamat	

=== Showcases ===
Title	Date	Venue	Location	Ref.
Complex Showcase	February 5, 2023	Ayala Malls Manila Bay	Parañaque	
Complex Friday (Note: co-headlining with PLAYERTWO)	March 24, 2023	URBN QC	Quezon City	
Superior Sessions Live (Note: co-headlining with Dilaw)	April 14, 2023	Social House Bar and Restaurant	Makati	
Complex Showcase	April 16, 2023	MarQuee Mall	Angeles	
Complex Live in Singapore	September 13, 2023	Clarke Quay	Singapore	
A Not So Silent Night: Felip Live in Abu Dhabi	December 24, 2023	Villaggio Hotel	Abu Dhabi	
Felip	January 16, 2024	12 Monkeys Music Hall & Pub	Pasig	

=== Guest Appearances ===
Event	Artist	Date	Venue	Location	Ref.
Aegis: The Christmas Bonus Concert	Aegis	December 20, 2023	Solaire	Parañaque	

=== Music Festivals ===
Event	Date	Venue	Location	Organizer(s)	Ref.
We Play Here	April 27, 2023	SM Aura Samsung Hall	Taguig	Warner Music Philippines	
Music Matters Live	September 12, 2023	*Scape The Ground Theatre	Singapore	Branded Pte Ltd.	
We Play Here - Ateneo	November 9, 2024	Ateneo JHS Covered Courts	Quezon City	Warner Music Philippines	
We Play Here: The Final Act	November 26, 2025	Ayala Triangle Garden	Makati	Warner Music Philippines	

=== Performances on Award Shows and Specials ===
Event	Date	Venue	Location	Performed Song(s)	Ref.
Miss Zamboanga Del Sur 2023 Coronation Night	September 17, 2023	Mega Gymnasium	Pagadian	"Criminal" • "I Want You"	
A Holiday Trail: Tree Lighting Ceremony	November 8, 2023	Ayala Malls Glorietta	Makati	"Rocksta" • "Palayo" • "Moving Closer" • "Criminal"	
Asia-Pacific Predator League	January 13, 2024	SM Mall of Asia Arena	Pasay	"Rocksta" • "Criminal" • "Drinksmoke" (Note: featuring Ylona Garcia)	
Lucky Chinatown's Countdown to Chinese New Year 2024	February 9, 2024	Lucky Chinatown Mall	Manila	"Rocksta" • "Superiority" • "Drinksmoke" • "Criminal" • "Straydogs" • "Mictest"	
Rhythms of the Heart	February 11, 2024	Ayala Malls Trinoma	Quezon City	"Rocksta" • "Criminal" • "Drinksmoke" • "Moving Closer" • "Pagdali" • "Flyyy" • "Palayo" (Note: collaboration performance with PLAYERTWO)	

== Awards and nominations ==
Award ceremony	Year	Category	Nominee(s)/work(s)	Result	Ref.
Wish Music Awards	2023	Breakthrough Artist of the Year	FELIP	Won	
Wish Music Awards	2023	Wisher's Choice Award	FELIP	Nominated	
Wish Music Awards	2023	Wishclusive R&B Performance of the Year	"Palayo"	Won	
Wish Music Awards	2024	Wishclusive Hip-hop Performance of the Year	"Rocksta"	Won	
Wish Music Awards	2025	Wish Rock/Alternative Song of the Year	"Kanako"	Won	
Myx Music Awards	2024	Rock Video of the Year	"Fake Faces"	Won	
PPOP Awards	2023	Top Performing Artist of the Year	FELIP	Won	
PPOP Awards	2024	Regional Song of the Year	"Kanako"	Won	
PPOP Awards	2024	Artist of the Year	FELIP	Nominated	
PPOP Awards	2024	Solo Artist of the Year	FELIP	Nominated	
PPOP Awards	2024	Concert of the Year	7sins: the album concert	Nominated	
PPOP Awards	2024	Album of the Year	7sins	Nominated	
PPOP Awards	2025	Solo Artist of the Year	FELIP	Won	
PPOP Awards	2025	PPOP Favorite Dancer of the Year	SB19 Ken	Won	
Push Awards	2023	Breakthrough Music Artist	FELIP	Won	
VP Choice Awards	2020	Fashion Influencer of the Year	Ken Suson	Won	
VP Choice Awards	2021	Fashion Influencer of the Year	Ken Suson	Won	
VP Choice Awards	2022	Fashion Influencer of the Year	Ken Suson	Won	
VP Choice Awards	2023	Fashion Influencer of the Year (HALL OF FAME)	FELIP	Won	
VP Choice Awards	2024	Fashion Influencer of the Year	FELIP	Nominated	
Channel R Radio Music Awards - Seattle, USA	2023	Best New Artist	FELIP	Nominated	
Awit Awards	2023	Best Instrumental Recording	"Bulan"	Nominated	
Awit Awards	2024	Best Cover Art	"Complex"	Nominated	
Awit Awards	2025	Best Vocal Arrangement	"ache"	Won	
Awit Awards	2025	Best Performance by A Solo Artist	"Fake Faces"	Nominated	
Awit Awards	2025	Best Global Collaboration Recording	"lust"	Nominated	
Awit Awards	2025	People's Voice Award for Favorite Solo Artist	FELIP	Won	
PMPC Star Awards for Music	2026	Rap Album of the Year	7sins	Nominated	
