= The Voice Generations (Philippine TV series) =

2023 Philippine television reality show

- Title card
- Genre: Reality competition
- Based on: The Voice Generations (2022) by John de Mol Jr.
- Directed by: Johnny Manahan
- Presented by: Dingdong Dantes
- Judges: Billy Crawford; Chito Miranda; Julie Anne San Jose; Stell
- Narrated by: Al Torres
- Country of origin: Philippines
- Original language: Tagalog
- No. of episodes: 16

Production
- Camera setup: Multiple-camera setup
- Running time: 75 minutes
- Production companies: ITV Studios; GMA Entertainment Group

Original release
- Network: GMA Network
- Release: August 27 – December 10, 2023

Related
- The Voice of the Philippines; The Voice Kids; The Voice Teens

The Voice Generations is a 2023 Philippine television reality competition show broadcast by GMA Network. Based on the Australian television series The Voice Generations, it is the third spin-off of The Voice of the Philippines. Directed by Johnny Manahan, it was hosted by Dingdong Dantes. It premiered on August 27, 2023 on the network's Sunday Grande sa Gabi line up. The show concluded on December 10, 2023, with a total of 16 episodes.

== Overview ==
=== Development ===
On January 7, 2023, GMA Network announced its series lineup for 2023, which included The Voice Generations, a spin-off of The Voice franchise that first aired in Australia a year prior. The series is the third spin-off of The Voice of the Philippines. Johnny Manahan, who directed the other versions of the series within the Philippines, returned to direct the Generations spin-off. The series was produced by ITV Studios.

On a media conference for the series, GMA Network announced that the series would premiere on August 27, 2023.

=== Producers' auditions ===
Cities in the Philippines where the auditions were held.

Online auditions for the series on April 20, 2023, to group acts which consist of two or more natural-born Filipinos aged seven years old and older, with at least two members that have at least a ten-year age gap from one another. It was also required that the members of the acts have an "authentic relationship" with one another. Acts with existing contracts with recording companies or talent managers were prohibited from auditioning.

Auditionees were assisted in their online audition process in dedicated booths at several Sparkle Caravan events. The auditions concluded with an in-person casting call held on June 15, 2023, at GMA Network Studios.

On-ground auditions for The Voice Generations
| Date | Venue | City | Ref. |
|---|---|---|---|
| May 12, 2023 | GMA Network Center | Quezon City | |
| May 13, 2023 | Sparkle Caravan | Iloilo City | |
| May 20, 2023 | Sparkle Caravan | Davao City | |
| May 21, 2023 | Park Inn by Radisson Davao | Davao City | |
| May 26, 2023 | GMA Network Center | Quezon City | |
| June 15, 2023 | GMA Network Center | Quezon City | |

=== Hosts ===
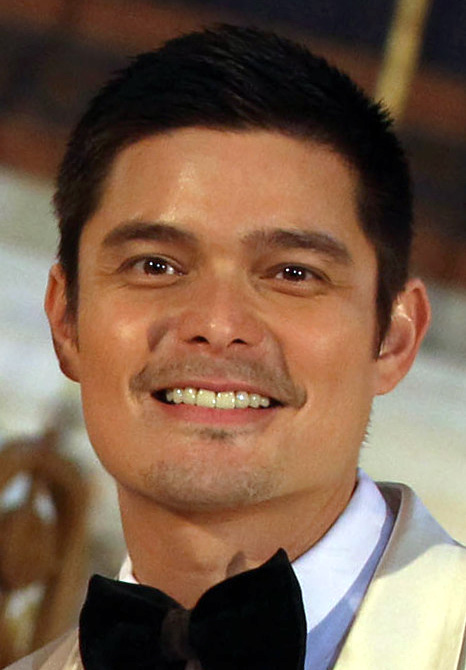
Dingdong Dantes served as the host.

Dingdong Dantes was announced as the series's host in a broadcast of All-Out Sundays on April 2, 2023. For the YouTube and Facebook livestreams, Crystal Paras and Timmy Albert hosted the pilot episode; Matt Lozano and Shuvee Etrata for episodes 2-5; and Betong Sumaya and Jennie Gabriel for episodes 6-16.

=== Coaches ===
Coaches of The Voice Generations

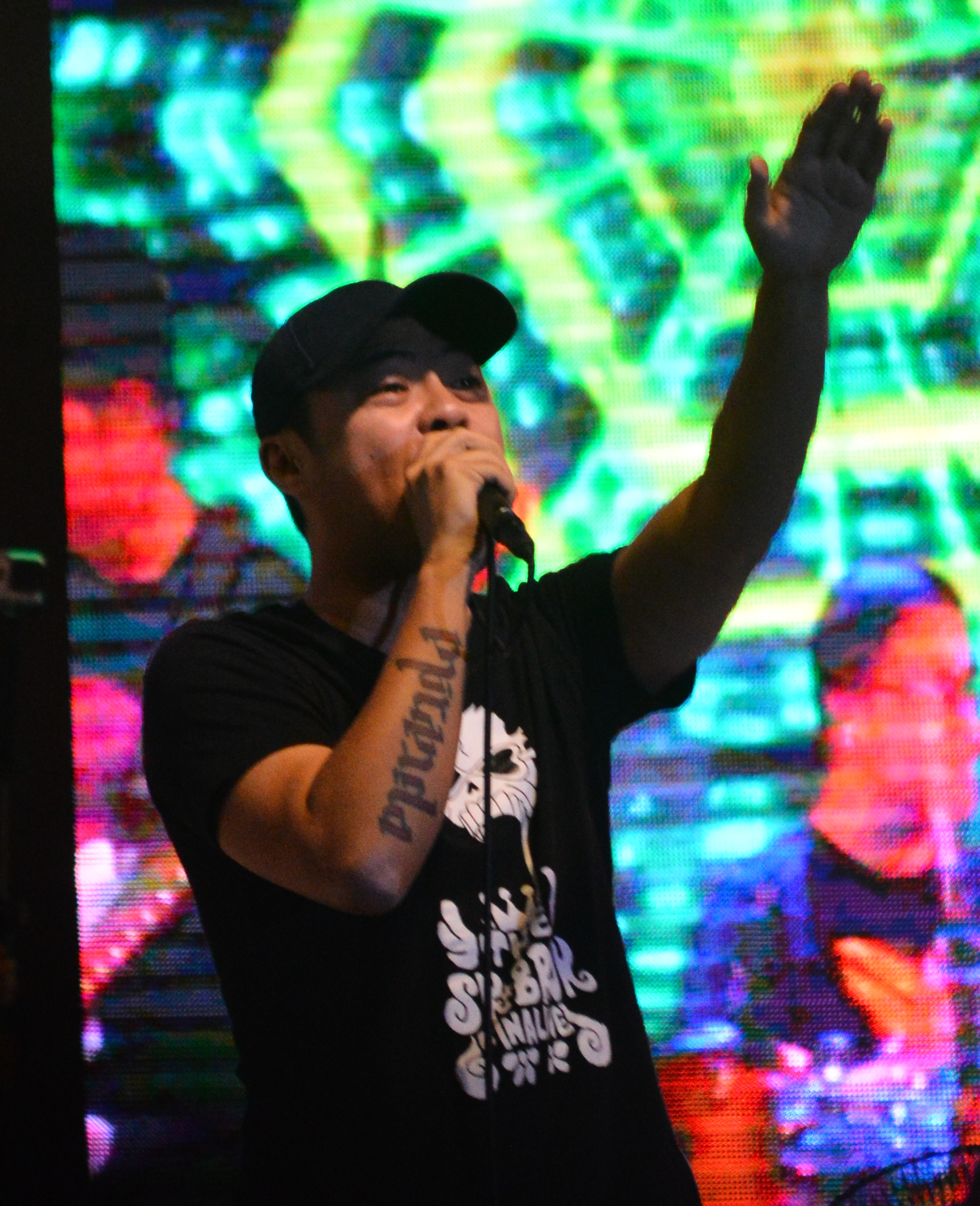
Chito Miranda

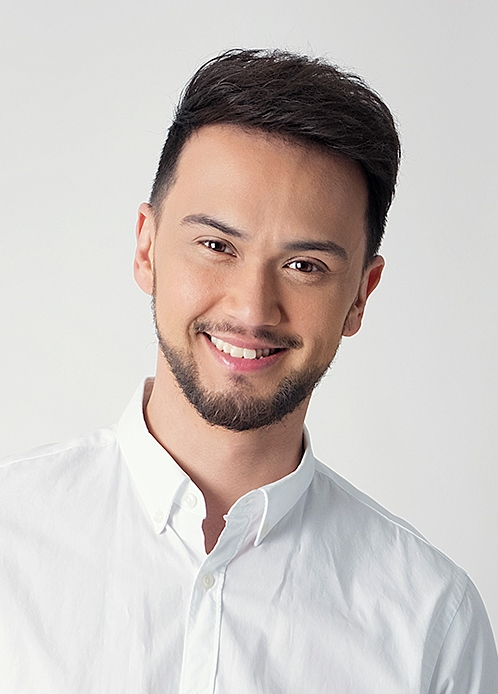
Billy Crawford

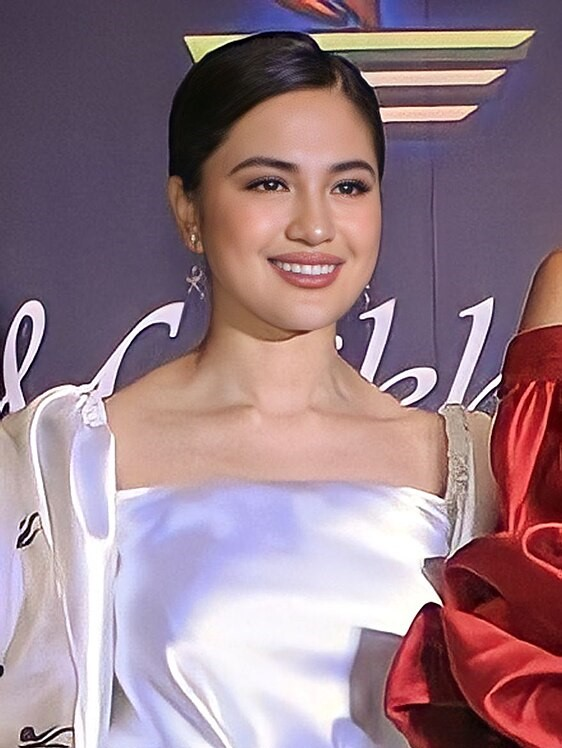
Julie Anne San Jose

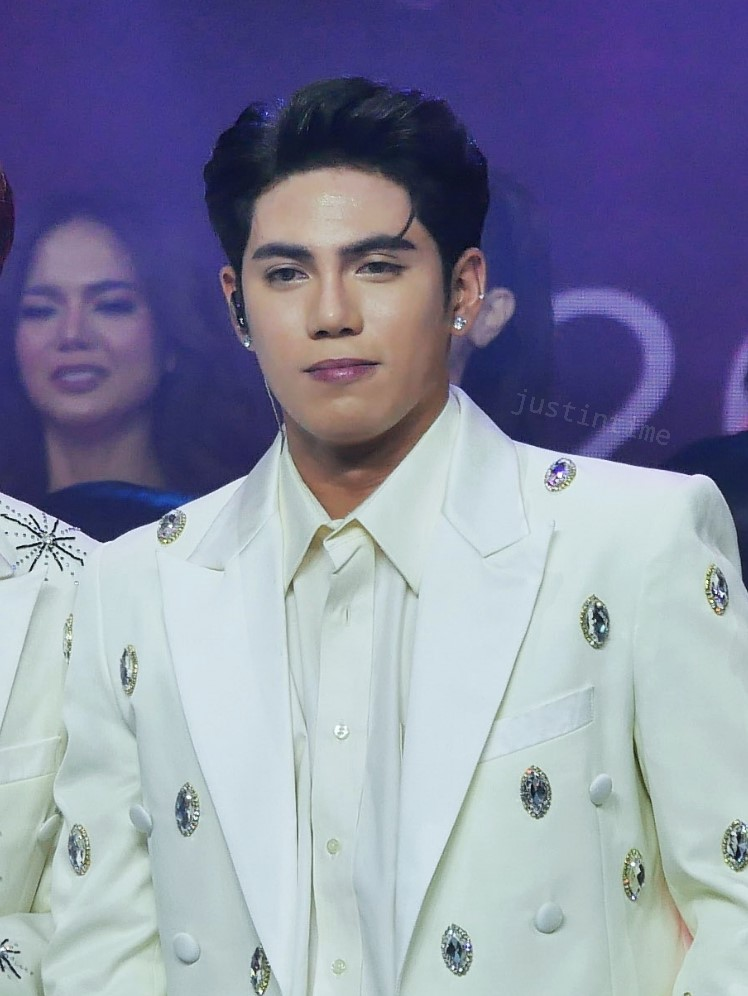
Stell

The show's panel of coaches was later announced on June 9, 2023, via the network's flagship news program, 24 Oras. The coaching panel consists of Billy Crawford, an actor and recording artist; Chito Miranda, the frontman of Parokya ni Edgar, who previously served as a judge on the second season of Idol Philippines a year prior; Julie Anne San Jose, a singer-songwriter who is regarded as one of the best-selling recording artists in the Philippines; and Stell, a member of the Philippine boy band SB19.

== Selection process and format ==
=== Blind auditions ===
The season opens with the Blind Auditions, the first televised stage of the competition. In this round, the four coaches sit in chairs facing the audience, with their backs turned to the artists. Judging solely on vocal ability, coaches press a button to turn their chairs if they’re interested in mentoring an artist. If more than one coach turns, the artist chooses whose team to join; if only one coach turns, the artist automatically joins that team. By the end of the round, each coach will have formed a team to advance to the next stage of the competition.

=== Competitions ===
Following the blind auditions, the artists will compete in the sing-offs, the battles, semi-finals and the live finale.

== Coaches' teams ==
=== Teams ===
Color key

- Winner
- Finalist
- Eliminated in the semi-finals
- Eliminated in the battles
- Eliminated in the sing-offs

| Coaches | Top 20 artists | | | | |
|---|---|---|---|---|---|
| Chito Miranda | | | | | |
| Chito Miranda | Sorority | Kris & Cha | Twirali | The Queens | Seendi (Note: Stylized in all caps.) |
| Billy Crawford | | | | | |
| Billy Crawford | P3 | Fources | Ayta Brothers | G-Code (Note: Stylized as G-CØDE.) | IOJ Band |
| Julie Anne San Jose | | | | | |
| Julie Anne San Jose | Music & Me | Mamaland | O Duo | Alliyana Trio | Chancess |
| Stell | | | | | |
| Stell | VocalMyx | ForteNors (Note: Stylized as FORTEnors.) | Luntayao Family | Mark & Willy | Imperial Duo |

== Blind auditions ==
The show premiered with the Blind Auditions on August 27, 2023. In this stage, artists perform while the coaches sit with their chairs facing the audience. If a coach is interested, they press a button to turn and face the performer. If only one coach turns, the artist automatically joins their team; if multiple coaches turn, the artist chooses which team to join.

Each coach— Chito (Parokya ni Chito), Billy (Team Bilib), Julie (JuleSquad), and Stell (StellBound)— is tasked with building a team of five acts. By the end of the round, 20 acts advanced to the next stage, including four who received turns from all four coaches.

Blind auditions color key
| ✔ | Coach pressed "I WANT YOU" button |
| | Artists defaulted to a coach's team |
| | Artists joined this coach's team |
| | Artists were eliminated with no coach pressing their button |

=== Episode 1 (August 27) ===
The broadcast began with the coaches performing "Don't Stop Me Now" by Queen.

First blind audition results
| Order | Artist | Age | Hometown | Song | Coach's and artist's choices | | | |
| Order | Artist | Age | Hometown | Song | Chito | Billy | Julie | Stell |
|---|---|---|---|---|---|---|---|---|
| 1 | VocalMyx | 13–24 | Cagayan de Oro | "Haypa" | ✔ | ✔ | ✔ | ✔ |
| 2 | Alliyana Trio | 10–32 | Bicol | "Emotion" | – | – | ✔ | – |
| 3 | Fources | 12–? | Quezon | "Alapaap" | – | ✔ | – | – |
| 4 | The Sons | —N/a | —N/a | "Himala" | – | – | – | – |
| 5 | Sorority | 16–26 | Cebu | "Lady Marmalade" | ✔ | – | – | – |

=== Episode 2 (September 3) ===
Second blind audition results
| Order | Artist | Age | Hometown | Song | Coach's and artist's choices | | | |
| Order | Artist | Age | Hometown | Song | Chito | Billy | Julie | Stell |
|---|---|---|---|---|---|---|---|---|
| 1 | O Duo | 10 & ? | —N/a | "Rolling in the Deep" | – | – | ✔ | – |
| 2 | Ayta Brothers | —N/a | —N/a | "All My Life" | ✔ | ✔ | ✔ | ✔ |
| 3 | The Glitter | 21–31 | —N/a | "Kapayapaan" | – | – | – | – |
| 4 | ForteNors | —N/a | —N/a | "Narito Ako" | ✔ | ✔ | – | ✔ |
| 5 | The Queens | 16 & 26 | —N/a | "Hanggang Kailan" | ✔ | – | – | ✔ |

=== Episode 3 (September 10) ===
Third blind audition results
| Order | Artist | Age | Hometown | Song | Coach's and artist's choices | | | |
| Order | Artist | Age | Hometown | Song | Chito | Billy | Julie | Stell |
|---|---|---|---|---|---|---|---|---|
| 1 | Mamaland | 27 & 42 | Las Piñas / Cainta, Rizal | "Banal Na Aso, Santong Kabayo" | – | – | ✔ | ✔ |
| 2 | Denians Vocal Ensemble | —N/a | Davao | "Iisang Bangka" | – | – | – | – |
| 3 | Twirali | 10–37 | —N/a | "Anak" | ✔ | – | – | – |
| 4 | IOJ Band | —N/a | —N/a | "Sana Dalawa Ang Puso Ko" | ✔ | ✔ | ✔ | ✔ |
| 5 | Imperial Duo | —N/a | Tondo, Manila | "When You Believe" | – | – | ✔ | ✔ |

=== Episode 4 (September 17) ===
Fourth blind audition results
| Order | Artist | Age | Hometown | Song | Coach's and artist's choices | | | |
| Order | Artist | Age | Hometown | Song | Chito | Billy | Julie | Stell |
|---|---|---|---|---|---|---|---|---|
| 1 | P3 | 23–33 | Pampanga | "Noypi" | ✔ | ✔ | – | – |
| 2 | Luntayao Family | —N/a | —N/a | "Mapa" | ✔ | – | – | ✔ |
| 3 | Amazing JDF | —N/a | Cebu | "Bakit Kung Sino Pa" | – | – | – | – |
| 4 | Seendi | 29–49 | —N/a | "Upuan" | ✔ | – | – | – |
| 5 | Music & Me | —N/a | Bohol | "Makita Kang Muli" | ✔ | ✔ | ✔ | ✔ |

=== Episode 5 (September 24) ===
Fifth blind audition results
| Order | Artist | Age | Hometown | Song | Coach's and artist's choices | | | |
| Order | Artist | Age | Hometown | Song | Chito | Billy | Julie | Stell |
|---|---|---|---|---|---|---|---|---|
| 1 | Jill & Grace | 8 & ? | —N/a | "Fight Song" | – | – | – | – |
| 2 | G-Code | 15–26 | —N/a | "Amakabogera" | ✔ | ✔ | – | – |
| 3 | Chancess | —N/a | —N/a | "Tadhana" | – | team full | ✔ | – |
| 4 | Kris & Cha | 58 & ? | —N/a | "Yakapin Mo Ako" | ✔ | team full | team full | ✔ |
| 5 | Mark & Willy | 52 & 29 | —N/a | "Ikaw ang Pangarap" | team full | team full | team full | ✔ |

== Sing-offs ==
The second stage of the competition, the Sing-offs, began airing on October 1, 2023, featuring 20 artists. At the start of each episode, coaches randomly draw envelopes backstage to determine which team will perform— whoever draws the envelope with the show's logo goes first. Coaches also decide the performance order of their team members.

In this round, artists perform a song of their choice for their respective coach. At the end of the episode, each coach selects four acts to advance to the Battles, narrowing the competition to 16 artists.

Color key

| Artists were chosen by their coach to advance to the battles. |
| Group was eliminated. |

Sing-offs results
| Episode | Coach | Order | Artist | Song | Result |
|---|---|---|---|---|---|
| Episode 6 (October 1) | Billy Crawford | 1 | IOJ Band | "Eto na Naman" | Eliminated |
| Episode 6 (October 1) | Billy Crawford | 2 | G-Code | "Salute" | Advanced |
| Episode 6 (October 1) | Billy Crawford | 3 | Ayta Brothers | "Atin Cu Pung Singsing/Tayo na Lang" | Advanced |
| Episode 6 (October 1) | Billy Crawford | 4 | Fources | "Iris" | Advanced |
| Episode 6 (October 1) | Billy Crawford | 5 | P3 | "Can't Help Falling in Love" | Advanced |
| Episode 7 (October 8) | Chito Miranda | 1 | Seendi | "Rocketeer" | Eliminated |
| Episode 7 (October 8) | Chito Miranda | 2 | Twirali | "And I Am Telling You I'm Not Going" | Advanced |
| Episode 7 (October 8) | Chito Miranda | 3 | The Queens | "New York, New York" | Advanced |
| Episode 7 (October 8) | Chito Miranda | 4 | Kris & Cha | "How Am I Supposed to Live Without You" | Advanced |
| Episode 7 (October 8) | Chito Miranda | 5 | Sorority | "I'm Every Woman" | Advanced |
| Episode 8 (October 15) | Julie Anne San Jose | 1 | Music & Me | "It's All Coming Back to Me Now" | Advanced |
| Episode 8 (October 15) | Julie Anne San Jose | 2 | O Duo | "Where Is the Love?" | Advanced |
| Episode 8 (October 15) | Julie Anne San Jose | 3 | Chancess | "Hindi Tayo Pwede" | Eliminated |
| Episode 8 (October 15) | Julie Anne San Jose | 4 | Mamaland | "Rise Up" | Advanced |
| Episode 8 (October 15) | Julie Anne San Jose | 5 | Alliyana Trio | "Habang May Buhay" | Advanced |
| Episode 9 (October 22) | Stell | 1 | Luntayao Family | "We Are the Champions" | Advanced |
| Episode 9 (October 22) | Stell | 2 | Imperial Duo | "I Will Always Love You" | Eliminated |
| Episode 9 (October 22) | Stell | 3 | Mark & Willy | "Buwan" | Advanced |
| Episode 9 (October 22) | Stell | 4 | VocalMyx | "Marupok" | Advanced |
| Episode 9 (October 22) | Stell | 5 | ForteNors | "Sana'y Wala Nang Wakas" | Advanced |

== Battles ==
The Battles began airing on October 29, 2023. Following the Sing-offs, each coach entered the round with four groups. As in the previous stage, coaches backstage drew envelopes to determine which teams would perform—this time, two coaches' teams were featured per episode.

Artists were unaware of their matchups until the day of their battle. Each group performed a back-to-back song selected by their coach, and at the end of each battle, one group was eliminated. By the close of the round, only eight groups remained in the competition.

To guide their teams, coaches were joined by advisors: Parokya ni Edgar for Parokya ni Chito, Zack Tabudlo for Team Bilib, Christian Bautista for JuleSquad, and SB19 for StellBound.

Color key

| Group was chosen by their coach to advance to the semi-finals |
| Group was eliminated. |

| Episode | Coach | Order | Song | Artists | | Song | Order |
| Episode | Coach | Order | Song | Winner | Loser | Song | Order |
|---|---|---|---|---|---|---|---|
| Episode 10 (October 29) | Julie Anne San Jose | 2 | "Flowers" | Mamaland | Alliyana Trio | "Holding Out for a Hero" | 1 |
| Episode 10 (October 29) | Stell | 4 | "This I Promise You" | ForteNors | Mark & Willy | "Tatsulok" | 3 |
| Episode 11 (November 5) | Billy Crawford | 2 | "Lunod" | Fources | G-Code | "Survivor" | 1 |
| Episode 11 (November 5) | Chito Miranda | 3 | "Against All Odds" | Kris & Cha | The Queens | "Ain't No Mountain High Enough" | 4 |
| Episode 12 (November 12) | Chito Miranda | 2 | "I Wanna Dance With Somebody (Who Loves Me)" | Sorority | Twirali | "Sino ang Baliw" | 1 |
| Episode 12 (November 12) | Stell | 3 | "Killing Me Softly with His Song" | VocalMyx | Luntayao Family | "All by Myself" | 4 |
| Episode 13 (November 19) | Billy Crawford | 2 | "Sa Ugoy ng Duyan" | P3 | Ayta Brothers | "One Day" | 1 |
| Episode 13 (November 19) | Julie Anne San Jose | 4 | "Livin' On A Prayer" | Music & Me | O Duo | "Somewhere Over the Rainbow" | 3 |

Non-competition performances
| Order | Performers | Song |
|---|---|---|
| 10.1 | SB19 | "Liham" |
| 11.1 | Billy Crawford & Zack Tabudlo | "Delulu" |
| 12.1 | Parokya ni Edgar | "Halaga" |
| 13.1 | Julie Anne San Jose & Christian Bautista | "Rewrite the Stars" |

== Semi-finals ==
The Semi-finals began airing on November 26, 2023, featuring the eight remaining groups— two per team— competing for a spot in the Grand Finals. After all performances, each coach selected one group from their team to advance to the Grand Finals, narrowing the competition to the final four.

| Group was chosen by their coach to advance to the finals |
| Group was eliminated |

| Episode | Order | Coach | Artist | Song | Result |
|---|---|---|---|---|---|
| Episode 14 (November 26) | 1 | Billy Crawford | Fources | "Story of My Life" | Eliminated |
| Episode 14 (November 26) | 2 | Billy Crawford | P3 | "All I Ask" | Billy's choice |
| Episode 14 (November 26) | 3 | Stell | VocalMyx | "Queen of the Night" | Stell's choice |
| Episode 14 (November 26) | 4 | Stell | ForteNors | "You Give Love a Bad Name" | Eliminated |
| Episode 15 (December 3) | 1 | Chito Miranda | Kris & Cha | "Always Remember Us This Way" | Eliminated |
| Episode 15 (December 3) | 2 | Chito Miranda | Sorority | "Doo Bidoo" | Chito's choice |
| Episode 15 (December 3) | 3 | Julie Anne San Jose | Mamaland | "Diamonds" | Eliminated |
| Episode 15 (December 3) | 4 | Julie Anne San Jose | Music & Me | "Defying Gravity" | Julie's choice |

Non-competition performances
| Order | Performers | Song |
|---|---|---|
| 14.1 | Jamie Miller & Stell | "Here's Your Perfect" |
| 14.2 | Jamie Miller & Julie Anne San Jose | "Maybe Next Time" |
| 15.1 | Apl.de.ap | "I Gotta Feeling" |
| 15.2 | Apl.de.ap, Chito Miranda & Billy Crawford | "Bebot" |

== Grand finals ==
The Grand Finals aired live on December 10, 2023, with one finalist representing each coach. The remaining four acts competed head-to-head, with the winner determined exclusively by public vote.

The grand prize included a trophy, a recording and management contract with UMG Philippines, and ₱1 million in cash.

| Winner |
| Finalist |

| Episode | Order | Coach | Artist | Song | Result |
|---|---|---|---|---|---|
| Episode 16 (December 10) | 1 | Julie Anne San Jose | Music & Me | "Hallelujah" | Finalist |
| Episode 16 (December 10) | 2 | Billy Crawford | P3 | "Go the Distance" | Finalist |
| Episode 16 (December 10) | 3 | Stell | VocalMyx | "Into the Unknown" | Winner |
| Episode 16 (December 10) | 4 | Chito Miranda | Sorority | "This Is Me" | Finalist |

== Ratings ==
According to AGB Nielsen Philippines' Nationwide Urban Television Audience Measurement People in television homes, the pilot episode of The Voice Generations earned an 11.1% rating.

== Accolades ==
Accolades received by The Voice Generations
| Year | Award | Category | Recipient | Result | Ref. |
|---|---|---|---|---|---|
| 2024 | Asian Academy Creative Awards | Best Adaptation of an Existing Format (Non-Scripted) | The Voice Generations | Won | |
