= Stell (singer) =

Filipino singer, dancer and choreographer (born 1995)

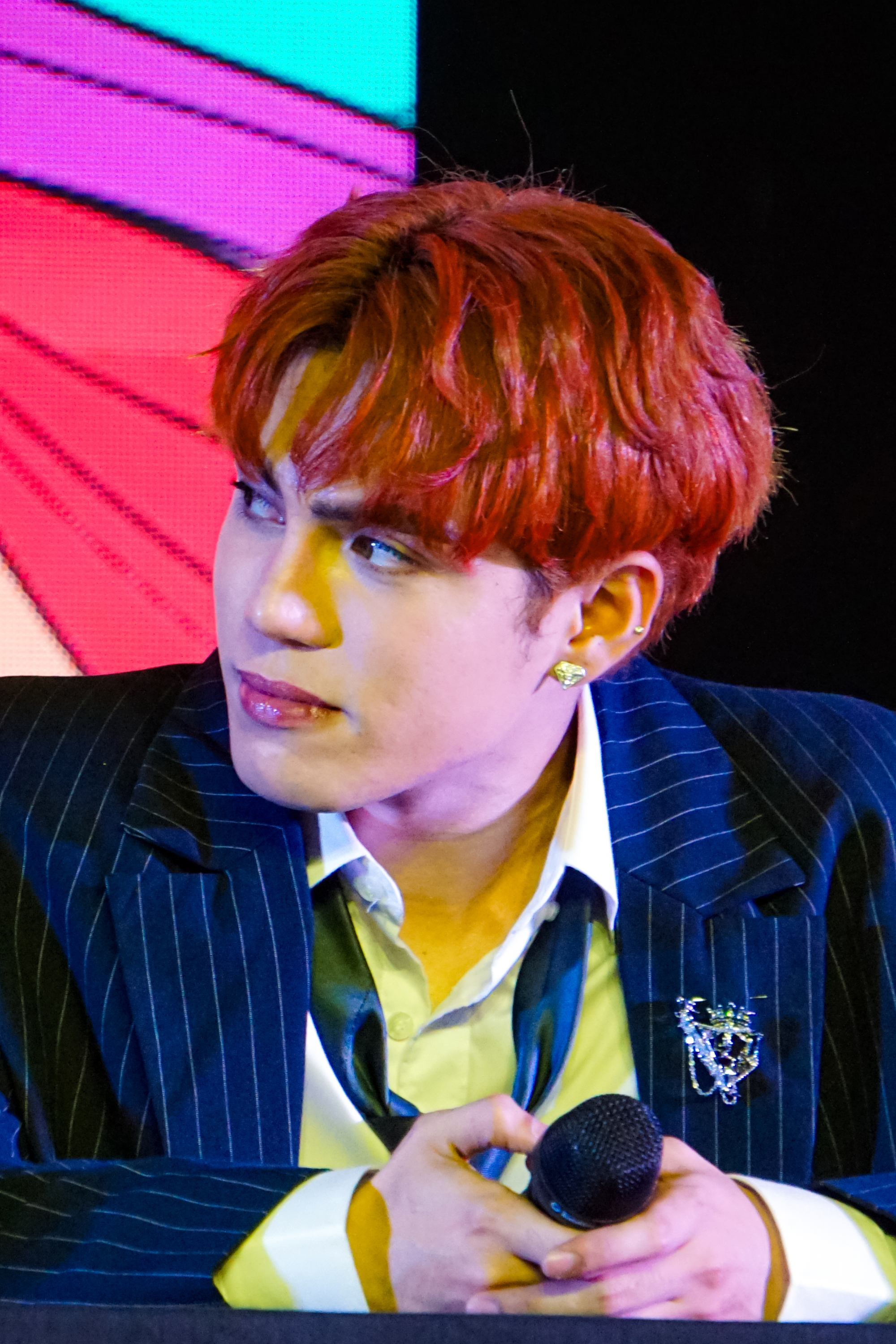
- Stell in 2023
- Born: Stellvester Ajero; June 16, 1995 (age 31); Las Piñas, Metro Manila, Philippines
- Education: STI College
- Occupations: Singer; dancer; choreographer; YouTuber
- Years active: 2018–present
- Musical career
- Genres: P-pop; Ballad; soul; pop
- Instruments: Vocals
- Labels: 1Z; Sony Philippines; ShowBT; Warner Philippines
- Member of: SB19

Stellvester Ajero (born June 16, 1995), known mononymously as Stell, is a Filipino singer, dancer, and choreographer. Known for his wide vocal range and skillset, he is the main vocalist, lead dancer and main choreographer of the Filipino boy band SB19 managed under 1Z Entertainment.

== Early life ==
Stell was born on June 16, 1995, in Las Piñas, Metro Manila, Philippines. He studied Hotel and Restaurant Management at STI College. Before joining SB19, Stell was a member of an internationally competitive dance group called SE-EON, along with future bandmate Josh.

== Career ==
=== 2018–present: SB19 ===
In 2016, Stell auditioned for ShowBT Philippines. He is the only member who choose to stay in the training before some members returned and continued what they started and debuted as SB19. As a former member of a dance cover group, he became the lead dancer and main choreographer.

On October 26, 2018, Stell debuted as a member of SB19, with fellow members Pablo, Josh, Justin, and Ken, with the single "Tilaluha".

Stell choreographed the dance routine of "What?", the first single of their extended play Pagsibol. He was also responsible for the choreography of their single "Where You At?".

==== Solo works ====
Stell was chosen as one of the performers in the musical show called "A Night of Wonder with Disney+" in November 2022 during the launch of streaming platform Disney+ in the Philippines. He sang his rendition of "Circle of Life" originally performed by Elton John, which was an original soundtrack for the 1994 film The Lion King.

He became part of GMA Network's adaptation of The Voice franchise in the country, as one of the coaches in The Voice Generations (2023), and The Voice Kids (2024).

On June 14, 2024, Stell released his debut single "Room" as a solo artist under the management of 1Z Entertainment and signed with the record label Warner Music Philippines. On August 2, 2024, Stell released his first EP, also named Room, which includes the titular song and four other tracks. He then went on a four-city tour to promote the Room EP, performing in Cebu, Davao, Cagayan de Oro and Taguig. Other than his own, many vocally demanding songs such as "Defying Gravity" from the musical "Wicked" or "My Heart Will Go On" by Celine Dion were on the track list of these shows.

Stell has appeared in the short film Ways.

== Artistry ==
=== Voice ===
Stell has been described as a countertenor.

Inspirations

Stell's music inspirations include Filipino singers Jed Madela and Morissette, Filipino-American singer Bruno Mars and the South Korean boy band VIXX.

== Discography ==
=== Single, extended play, album ===
Title	Details	Tracks	Length
Room (Single)	Released: 14 June 2024 Label: Warner Music Philippines Format: digital download, streaming media	Room	3:43
Room (EP)	Released: 02 August 2024 Label: Warner Music Philippines Format: digital download, streaming media	Room	3:43
Room (EP)	Released: 02 August 2024 Label: Warner Music Philippines Format: digital download, streaming media	Anino	4:57
Room (EP)	Released: 02 August 2024 Label: Warner Music Philippines Format: digital download, streaming media	'Di Ko Masabi	4:18
Room (EP)	Released: 02 August 2024 Label: Warner Music Philippines Format: digital download, streaming media	Classic	2:42
Room (EP)	Released: 02 August 2024 Label: Warner Music Philippines Format: digital download, streaming media	Room - Stripped version	4:03

== Music videos ==
Song title	Premiere date	Composer	Creative Director	Record label
ROOM	14 June 2024	PABLO	Justin de Dios and Xi-Anne Avancena	Warner Music Philippines
'DI KO MASABI	17 August 2024	Ryan Cayabyab	Xi-Anne Avancena	Warner Music Philippines
ANINO	31 August 2024	RADKIDZ	Xi-Anne Avancena	Warner Music Philippines

== Live performances, guestings and articles ==
Live Performances, Guestings and Articles
Filmography	Pagtatag! The Documentary
Music Video Appearances	Salamin ft. Stell Ajero Official Music Video by the Juans
Podcasts	Stell Reveals How SB19 Encouraged Him to Pursue a Solo Career 'The Voice Kids' coach and SB19's Stell on the GMA Pinoy TV Podcast Full Episode
Concert	Julie x Stell: Ang Ating Tinig, New Frontier Theatre
Concert Guesting	M&Ms Fan Meet - Ayala Malls Manila Bay Gen C Concert (Guest - 1st day) HITMAN David Foster and Friends Asia Tour 2024 (Front Act) milEStone Tour 2024 with Stell (Guest) SB90s The Streetboys Reunion Dance Concert (Guest) Get, Get, Aw! The Last rAWnd!
Ads / Endorsements	WAYS - Puregold Sari-Sari Stories
TV Guestings and Interviews	Stell's Impromptu Song Challenge: A Journey of Self-Discovery | MEGA Entertainment Jessica Soho's one-on-one interview with SB19's Stell Ajero | Kapuso Mo, Jessica Soho Fast Talk with Boy Abunda: Pablo at Stell, from idols to 'The Voice Kids' coaches ON CUE: Stell speaks Stell ROOM Showcase interview highlight Stell, saan nais dalhin ang pamilya ngayong Pasko at Bagong Taon? Fast Talk with Boy Abunda: Bakit MAPILI si Stell sa mga proyekto? Stell at Susan, titikman ang adobong kuliglig?! | I Juander Ketchup, ipinapares sa pansit?! | I Juander How well do Julie Anne San Jose and Stell Ajero know each other? | ATM Online Exclusive ATM All Access: Behind the scenes of 'Julie x Stell: Ang Ating Tinig' concert | ATM Online Exclusive SB19 Stell names the SEXIEST THINGS in his ROOM! | ATM Online Exclusive Stell Ajero - Stell "Room" Showcase x Interview FULL INTERVIEW: STELL GAME AND HUMBLE ATM All Access: SB19 Stell 'Room' Showcase | ATM Online Exclusive Stell ng SB19, kinabahan nang mag-perform sa concert ni David Foster | ABS-CBN News Fast Talk with Boy Abunda: Bakit NATULALA si Coach Stell noong Grand Finals? (Full Episode 228)
Articles	Room Single Release-related
Articles	SB19's Stell releases solo debut single 'Room' Stell of SB19 drops debut solo EP 'Room' Stell debuts as a soloist with 'Room,' released under Warner Music Philippines SB19's Stell drops debut single 'Room' SB19's Stell launches debut single 'Room,' to hold concert with Julie Anne San Jose Stell launches solo career with debut single, 'Room,' released under Warner Music Philippines SB19's Stell releases 'Room' music video The Voice (Of Future) Generations: SB19's Stell On His Goals As A Solo Artist SB19's Stell Lets You In His "Room" – Listen SB19's Stell Announces First EP 'Room,' To Go On Nationwide Tour This August SB19's Stell overwhelmed by love, support after debut single release SB19's Stell on why it took a long time for him to release solo music: 'Hindi ako ready' For SB19's Stell, solo debut is a leap of self-confidence, empowerment Stell goes 'solo' with full support of SB19 SB19's Stell hits million streams with 'Room' SB19's Stell calls debut solo single 'Room' a 'labor of love' SB19 Stell sa bagong image: Bolder, more mature, sexier!
Articles	Room EP Release-related
Articles	Stell of SB19 drops tracklist for 'Room' EP SB19's Stell Announces First EP 'Room,' To Go On Nationwide Tour This August Stell of SB19 announces dates for 'Room' solo tour SB19's Stell reveals tracklist for 'Room' EP; solo tour dates and locations Stell of SB19 releases concept photos for 'Room' EP Stell of SB19 has an upcoming song composed by Ryan Cayabyab Stell of SB19 drops debut solo EP 'Room' Make 'Room' For SB19's Stell And His Impressive Debut EP – Listen 5 THINGS INSIDE STELL'S ROOM SB19's Stell captivates in playful Cebu leg of 'Room Tour'
Articles	'Di Ko Masabi-related
Articles	SB19's Stell drops poster for 'Di Ko Masabi' MV featuring Filipina actress Nour Hooshmand SB19's Stell drops music video for single ''Di Ko Masabi' SB19's Stell, Nour Hooshmand's behind-the-scenes photos from ''Di Ko Masabi' MV shoot Stell Ajero nagpabilib sa music video ng 'Di Ko Masabi, magaling din sa aktingan!
Articles	Other related articles
	SB19's Stell Reveals What Inspired His Love For Music EXCLUSIVE: Is Stell Ajero Ready to Make It Big as a Solo Star? The P-Pop Artist Answers Music video ni Stell na ''Di Ko Masabi,' instant hit; Stell, napasabak sa pag-arte

== Awards and nominations ==
Awarding Body	Year	Category	Nomination (Artist / Work)	Result	Reference
38th Awit Awards	2025	Breakthrough Artist	Room	Won	
38th Awit Awards	2025	Favorite New Solo Artist	Stell	Won	
38th Awit Awards	2025	Best Ballad Recording	'Di Ko Masabi	Nominee	
37th Aliw Awards	2024	Best Collaboration in a Major Concert	Julie x Stell: Ang Ating Tinig	Won	
Wish Music Awards	2024	Wish Breakthrough Artist of the Year	Stell	Won	
Wish Music Awards	2024	Wish Ballad Song of the Year	"'Di Ko Masabi"	Won	
Wish Music Awards	2024	Wishers Choice Award	Stell	Won	
37th Awit Awards	2024	Breakthrough Artist	Stell	Nominee	
37th Awit Awards	2024	Favorite New Solo Artist	Stell	Nominee	
37th Awit Awards	2024	Favorite Solo Artist	Stell	Nominee	
The 7th Gawad Lasallianeta Award	2024	Most Influential Celebrity	Stell	Nominee	
Myx Music Awards	2024	Pop Video of the Year	"Room'	Nominee	
PPop Awards	2022	Main Vocal of the Year	Stell	Won	
PPop Music Awards	2023	Top Male Vocalist of the Year	Stell	Won	
PPop Music Awards	2024	Solo Artist of the Year	Stell	Nominee	
The 6th Gawad Lasallianeta Award	2023	Most Influential Celebrity	Stell	Nominee	
Village Pipol Choice Award	2023	Male Tiktok Face of the Year	Stellvester Ajero	Won	
