= SB19 discography =

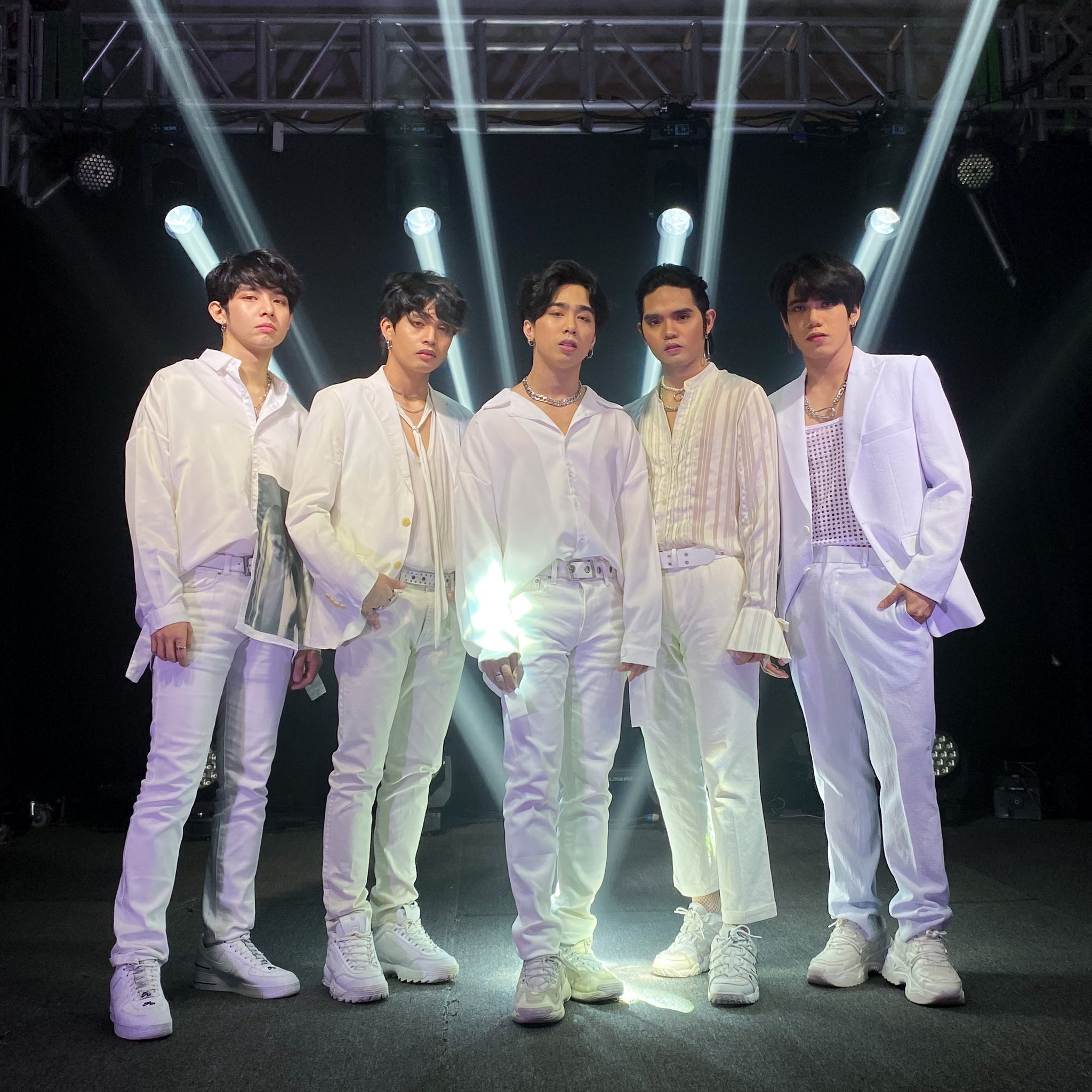
- SB19 at the YouTube FanFest 2020 (from left to right): Justin, Ken, Josh, Pablo, and Stell
- Studio albums: 2
- EPs: 3
- Live albums: 1
- Singles: 19
- Promotional singles: 7
- Soundtrack appearances: 6

The Filipino boy band SB19 has released two studio albums, three extended plays (EPs), one live album, nineteen singles (including one as a featured artist), and seven promotional singles. With over one billion streams on Spotify, SB19 has been named one of the most-streamed Filipino artists on the platform and one of the most successful acts for promoting P-pop music. Their success has led them to achieve international recognition for their work.

ShowBT Entertainment, a South Korean talent agency, formed SB19 in 2016 after its members were selected from a talent search that year to undergo training. The band's career began with the release of their debut single, "Tilaluha", in 2018, which had a weak reception. They pursued dance-pop sounds in later releases and achieved mainstream success after their second single, "Go Up", went viral on YouTube in 2019. The group signed a recording deal with Sony Music Philippines later that year and released another single, "Alab (Burning)". In 2020, COVID-19 community quarantines in the Philippines led to the release of "Ikako" as a homage to healthcare workers, which was available exclusively on YouTube as a promotional single. Later, the band released their debut nine-track studio album, Get in the Zone, in July 2020.

In 2021, SB19 released their first EP, Pagsibol, completely self-written by the band's leader, Pablo, which experimented with different musical styles, such as hip hop and EDM. The EP spawned singles "What?", "Mapa", and "Bazinga", the latter being among the most talked-about songs on Twitter, topping Billboard's Hot Trending Songs chart. Later, SB19 and Ben&Ben collaborated for a "Band Version" remix of "Mapa". Later in the year, the group released "No Stopping You" and its remix with Jayda for the Love at First Stream soundtrack and a Christmas single, "Ligaya", and was featured on Ohwon Lee's single "Love Yours". In 2022, SB19 released renditions of the Itchyworms' "Kabataang Pinoy" with Bini and "Win Your Heart" as theme songs for Pinoy Big Brother: Kumunity Season 10 – Teen Edition (2022) and Binibining Pilipinas 2022, respectively. That same year, they also released "WYAT (Where You At)" and "Nyebe" as standalone singles, followed by the release of their cover version of Eraserheads' "Christmas Party".

The group continued with similar musical styles from their previous EP and released their second EP, Pagtatag!, in 2023. It spawned their first sales-charting single, "Gento", which reached the top 10 in the Philippines and on Billboard's World Digital Song Sales chart, becoming SB19's first entry to both charts. The single also made the band the first Filipino group to have an entry on the latter. They followed the EP's release with a collaboration with Jvke for the remix of his single "Golden Hour" (2023). The group collaborated with Ian Asher and Terry Zhong for the single "Moonlight", with apl.de.ap for the single "Ready", and with Gloc-9 for the single "Kalakal", in which the three of them was released in 2024.

== Studio albums ==
List of studio albums, with select chart positions
Title	Details	Peak chart positions		
Title	Details	JPN Dig.	JPN DL	UK DL
Get in the Zone	Released: July 31, 2020; Label: Sony Music Philippines; Formats: CD, digital download, streaming	—	—	—
Wakas at Simula	Released: March 27, 2026; Label: Sony Music Philippines; Formats: Digital download, streaming	41	38	31
"—" denotes a recording that did not chart.

== Live albums ==
List of live albums, with select chart positions
Title	Details	Peak chart positions
Title	Details	UK DL
Simula at Wakas: Kickoff Concert Album	Released: January 30, 2026; Label: Sony Music Philippines; Formats: Digital download, streaming	68

== Extended plays ==
List of extended plays, with select chart positions and sales figures
Title	Details	Peak chart positions			Sales
Title	Details	JPN	JPN Sales	UK Sales	Sales
Pagsibol	Released: July 22, 2021; Label: Sony Music Philippines; Formats: CD, digital download, streaming	—	—	—	
Pagtatag!	Released: June 9, 2023; Label: Sony Music Philippines; Formats: Digital download, streaming	—	—	—	
Simula at Wakas	Released: April 25, 2025; Label: Sony Music Philippines; Formats: CD, digital download, streaming	32	17	40	JPN: 3,578
"—" denotes a recording that did not chart.

== Singles ==
=== As lead artist ===
List of singles, showing year released, selected chart positions, and associated albums
Title	Year	Peak chart positions										Album
Title	Year	PHL	PHL IFPI	CAN Dig.	JPN Dig.	JPN DL	NZ Hot	SAU	UAE	UK Sales	US World	Album
"Tilaluha"	2018	*	*	—	—	—	—	*	*	—	—	Get in the Zone
"Go Up"	2019	*	*	—	—	—	—	*	*	—	—	Get in the Zone
"Alab (Burning)"	2019	*	*	—	—	—	—	*	*	—	—	Get in the Zone
"What?"	2021	*	*	—	—	—	—	*	*	—	—	Pagsibol
"Mapa" (solo or with Ben&Ben or with Aruma)	2021	*	*	—	—	—	—	*	*	—	—	Pagsibol
"Bazinga"	2021	*	*	—	—	—	—	*	*	—	—	Pagsibol
"Ligaya"	2021	*	*	—	—	—	—	*	*	—	—	Non-album singles
"WYAT (Where You At)"	2022	—	*	—	—	—	—	*	*	—	—	Non-album singles
"Nyebe"	2022	—	*	—	—	—	—	—	—	—	—	Non-album singles
"Gento"	2023	11	*	—	—	—	—	—	—	—	8	Pagtatag!
"Moonlight" (with Ian Asher and Terry Zhong)	2024	—	*	—	—	—	—	—	—	—	—	Non-album singles
"Ready" (with apl.de.ap)	2024	—	*	—	—	—	—	—	—	—	—	Non-album singles
"Kalakal" (with Gloc-9)	2024	—	*	—	—	—	—	—	—	—	—	Non-album singles
"Dam"	2025	4	5	14	—	—	21	17	7	4	1	Simula at Wakas
"Umaaligid" (with Sarah Geronimo)	2025	49	—	—	—	—	—	—	—	50	4	Non-album single
"Visa"	2026	60	—	—	—	—	—	—	—	—	6	Wakas at Simula
"Emoji" (with Jolin Tsai)	2026	62	—	—	—	—	38	—	—	—	—	Wakas at Simula
"Lawless"	2026	32	—	—	—	—	28	—	—	61	*	Non-album single
"Toyfriend" (with Be:First)	2026	—	—	—	7	6	—	—	—	—	*	Wakas at Simula
"—" denotes a single that did not chart. "*" denotes that chart did not exist at the time of the song's release.

=== As featured artist ===
List of singles as featured artist, showing year released and associated albums
Title	Year	Album
"Love Yours" (Ohwon Lee featuring SB19)	2021	Real Recognize Real

== Promotional singles ==
List of promotional singles, showing year released, selected chart positions and associated albums
Title	Year	Peak chart positions	Album
Title	Year	US World	Album
"Ikako"	2020	—	Pagsibol
"No Stopping You" (solo or with Jayda)	2021	—	Love at First Stream (Original Soundtrack)
"Kabataang Pinoy" (with Bini)	2022	—	Non-album promotional singles
"Win Your Heart"	2022	—	Non-album promotional singles
"Christmas Party (SB19 Version)"	2022	—	Non-album promotional singles
"Golden Hour (SB19 Remix)" (with Jvke)	2023	—	Non-album promotional singles
"Burn the Flame"	2025	9	Non-album promotional singles
"Together in Motion"	2026	—	Non-album promotional singles
"Firestarter"	2026	—	Non-album promotional singles
"—" denotes a song that did not chart.

== Other charted songs ==
List of other charted songs, showing year released, selected chart positions, and associated albums
Title	Year	Peak chart positions		Album
Title	Year	PHL	US World	Album
"Time"	2025	35	—	Simula at Wakas
"8TonBall"	2025	73	—	Simula at Wakas
"Quit"	2025	71	—	Simula at Wakas
"Shooting for the Stars"	2025	86	—	Simula at Wakas
"Dungka!"	2025	21	7	Simula at Wakas
"Wakas"	2026	—	9	Wakas at Simula
"—" denotes a song that did not chart.

== Soundtrack appearances ==
List of media in which SB19's songs have been used
Year	Film/series/program	Song(s)	Ref.
2021	Love at First Stream	"No Stopping You" (solo or with Jayda)	
2022	Pinoy Big Brother: Kumunity Season 10 – Teen Edition	"Kabataang Pinoy" (with Bini)	
2022	Binibining Pilipinas 2022	"Win Your Heart"	
2023	Senior High	"Bazinga"	
2024	Pulang Araw	"Kapangyarihan" (with Ben&Ben)	
2024	And the Breadwinner Is...	"Mapa"	
2024	Green Bones	"Nyebe"	
2026	Forgotten Island	"Mga Kababayan"	

== See also ==
- List of songs recorded by SB19
