= List of songs recorded by SB19 =

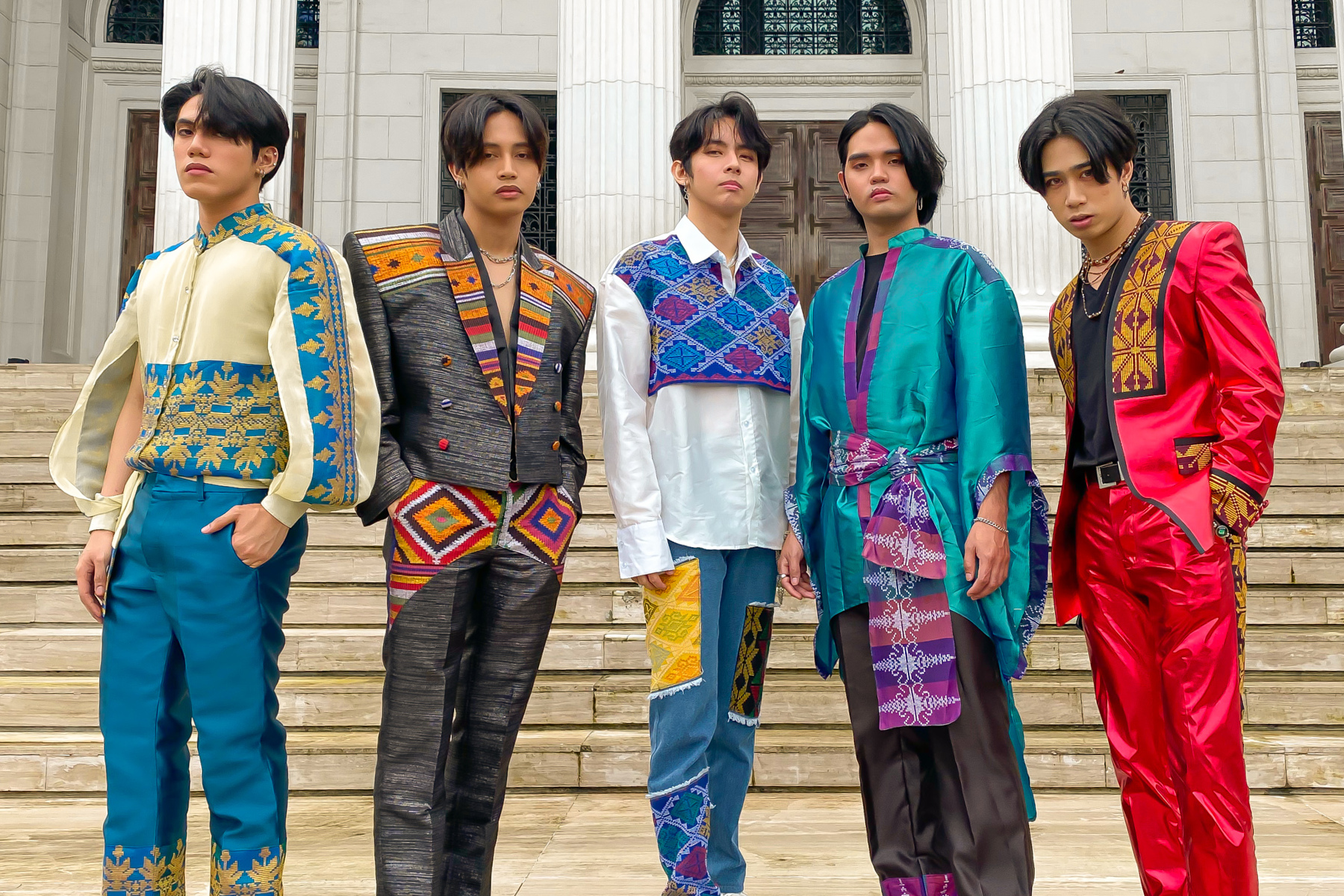
SB19 at the National Museum of Natural History in 2020 (from left to right): Stell, Ken, Justin, Pablo, and Josh

The Filipino boy band SB19 has recorded material for two studio albums and three extended plays (EPs). Besides their own discography, the band has also recorded songs with other artists and released recordings associated with their various brand endorsements. The band leader, Pablo, is mainly involved in writing for their material, having contributed to lyrics and compositions for their major releases since their debut.

The band was formed in 2016 by a South Korean talent agency, ShowBT Entertainment, and debuted in 2018 when they released their debut single, "Tilaluha", which received little success. The group pursued dance-pop sounds in their debut studio album, Get in the Zone, released in 2020. Its single, "Go Up" (2019), went viral on YouTube, which brought them to mainstream success. They explored different musical styles, such as hip hop and EDM, for their first EP, Pagsibol, released in 2021. Pagsibol was solely written by Pablo, including its 2021 singles, "What?", "Mapa", and "Bazinga". The group continued with similar musical styles for their next few EPs, Pagtatag! (2023) and Simula at Wakas (2025), which included singles, "Gento" (2023) and "Dam" (2025). Apart from album releases, they have also released standalone singles "Ligaya" (2021), "WYAT (Where You At)" (2022), and "Nyebe" (2022).

SB19 has recorded songs with other artists, releasing collaborations with Ben&Ben for "Mapa (Band Version)" (2021), with Bini for their rendition of the Itchyworms' "Kabataang Pinoy" (2022), with Jvke for the remix of "Golden Hour" (2023), with Ian Asher and Terry Zhong for "Moonlight" (2024), with apl.de.ap for "Ready" (2024), and with Sarah Geronimo for "Umaaligid" (2025). For the film Love at First Stream (2021), they recorded its theme song, "No Stopping You" (2021). They also released their own renditions of the songs "Win Your Heart" (2022), the theme song to Binibining Pilipinas 2022, and Eraserheads' "Christmas Party" (2022). In addition to their own material, SB19 has featured in Ben&Ben's "Kapangyarihan", from the album Pebble House, Vol. 1: Kuwaderno (2021), and Ohwon Lee's "Love Yours" (2021). Multiple brands have collaborated with SB19 for various recordings, with some released to digital streaming platforms, including one co-written by Pablo, "The One" (2022), for Dunkin' Donuts.

== Songs ==
Key
†	Indicates single release
‡	Indicates promotional single release

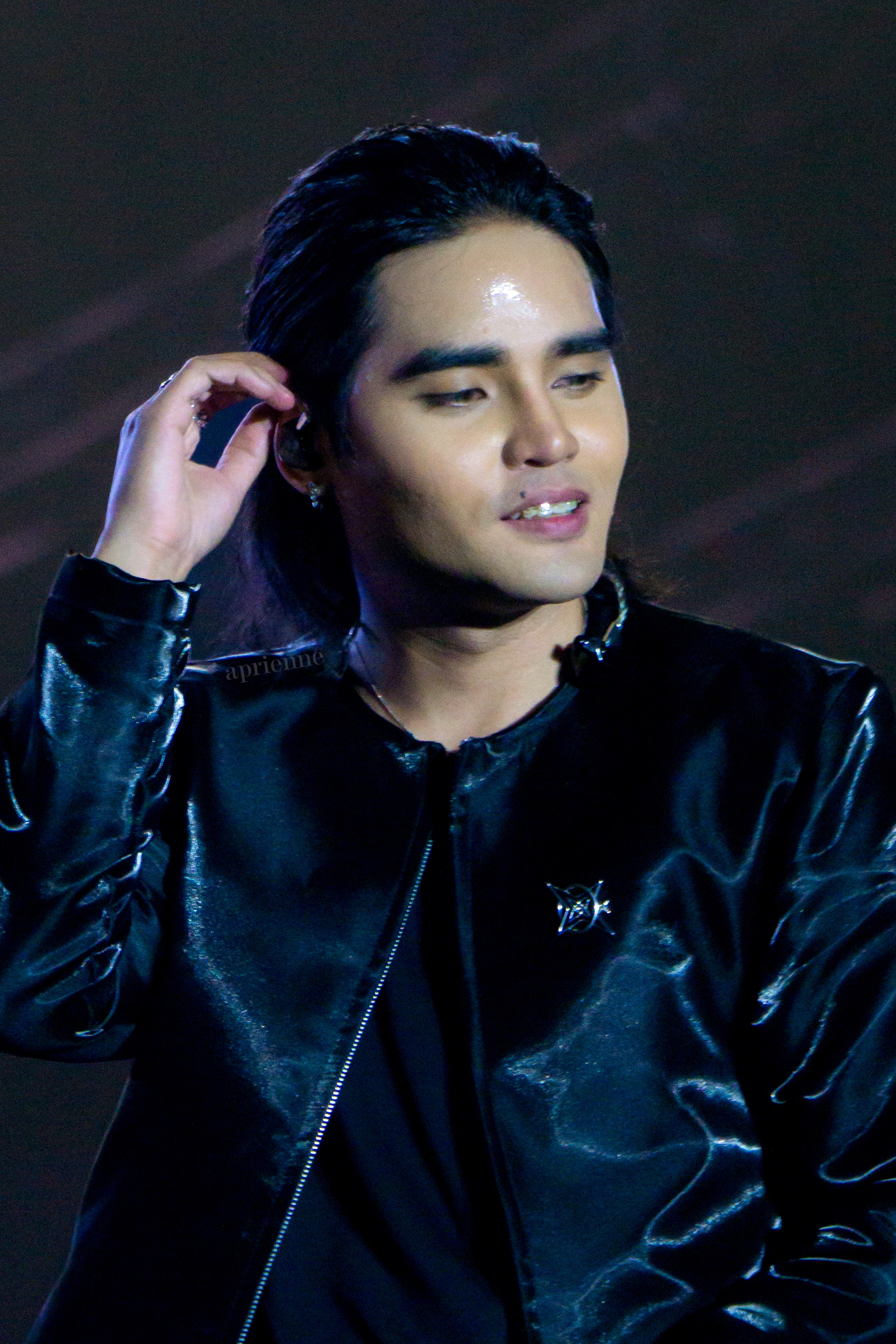
Pablo has written most of the boy band's major releases.

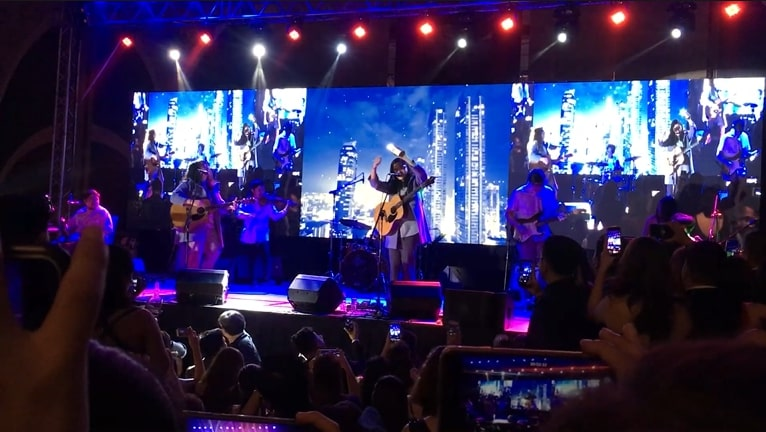
Ben&Ben have collaborated with SB19 for "Mapa (Band Version)" (2021) and "Kapangyarihan" (2021).

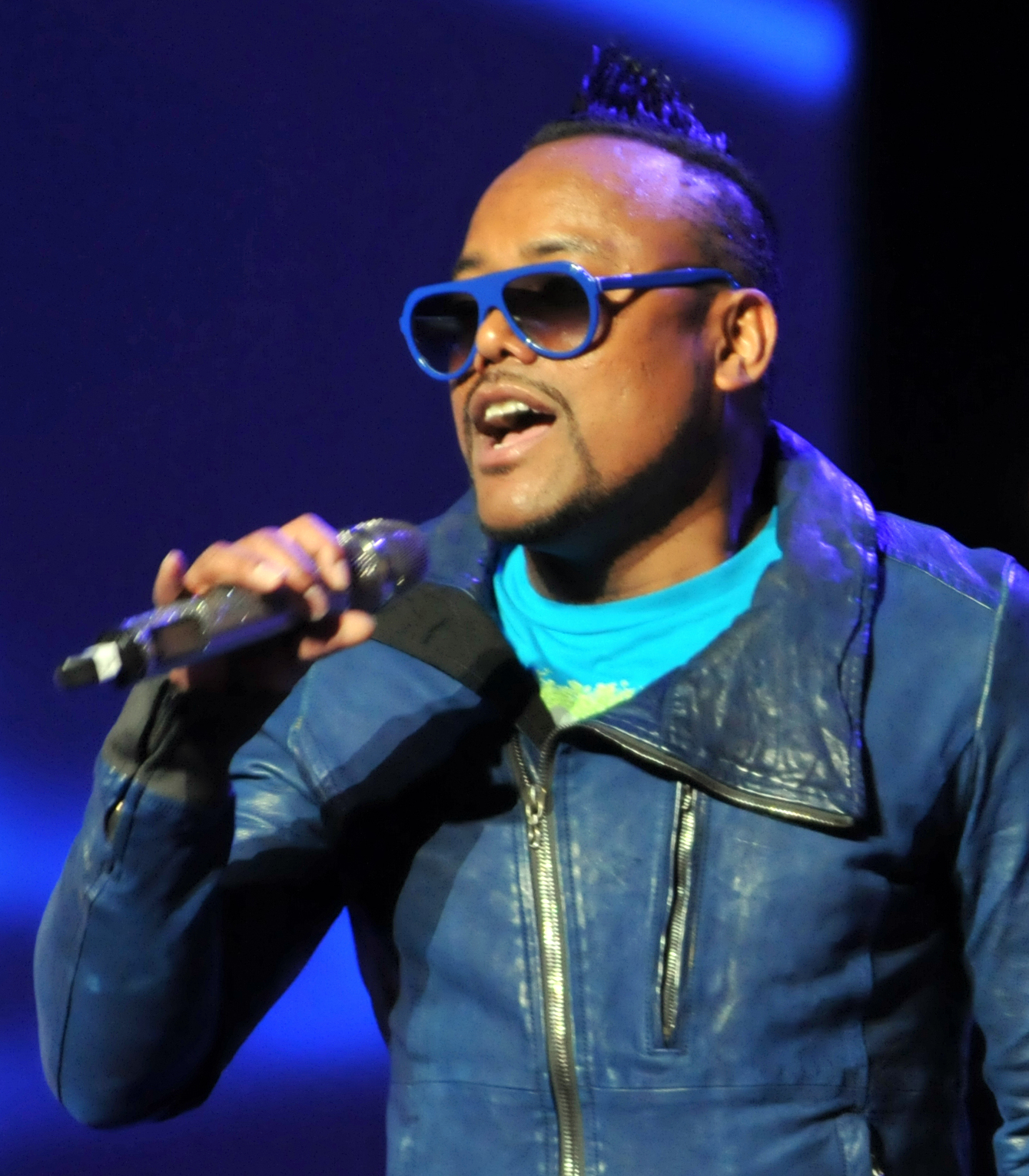
apl.de.ap of the Black Eyed Peas has collaborated with SB19 for "Ready" (2024).

Name of song, credited artist(s), writer(s), associated album, and year of release
Song	Artist(s)	Writer(s)	Album	Year	Ref(s).
"8TonBall"	SB19	Alawn; Benji Bae; Josh Cullen Santos	Simula at Wakas	2025	
"Ace Your World"	SB19 and Sarah Geronimo	John Paulo Nase; Joshua Daniel Nase	None	2023	
"Alab (Burning)" †	SB19	Han Tae Soo; John Paulo Nase	Get in the Zone	2019	
"Ating Pasko"	SB19 and G22	Paolo Miguel Rañeses; Brenan Espartinez	None	2024	
"Bazinga" †	SB19	John Paulo Nase	Pagsibol	2021	
"Burn the Flame" ‡	SB19	Kasper Larsen; Las; Popkin; Schuba; Brenan Espartinez	None	2025	
"Christmas Party" (SB19 version) ‡	SB19	Ely Buendia	None	2022	
"Crimzone"	SB19	John Paulo Nase; Joshua Daniel Nase; Felip Jhon Suson; Josh Cullen Santos	Pagtatag!	2023	
"Dam" †	SB19	John Paulo Nase; Joshua Daniel Nase; Simon Servida	Simula at Wakas	2025	
"Dobleng GV sa FunPasko (Noon, Ngayon, Palagi)"	The Juans and SB19	None credited	None	2021	
"Dungka!"	SB19	John Paulo Nase; Joshua Daniel Nase	Simula at Wakas	2025	
"Emoji" †	SB19 and Jolin Tsai	Felip Jhon Suson; John Paulo Nase; Jolin Tsai; Joshua Daniel Nase; Chendy	Wakas at Simula	2026	
"Everblack"	SB19	Felip Jhon Suson; John Paulo Nase	Wakas at Simula	2026	
"Firestarter"	SB19	Aejin Kwon; Ashley Fulton; Georgia Ku; James Norton; David Dahlquist; Sebastian Najan	None	2026	
"Freedom"	SB19	John Paulo Nase; Joshua Daniel Nase	Pagtatag!	2023	
"G Pa Rin ang Pasko"	SB19	Teddy Katigbak	None	2021	
"Gento" †	SB19	John Paulo Nase	Pagtatag!	2023	
"Go Up" †	SB19	Ohwon Lee; Glow; John Paulo Nase	Get in the Zone	2019	
"Golden Hour" (SB19 remix) ‡	Jvke and SB19	Jake Lawson; Zac Lawson	None	2023	
"Hanggang sa Huli"	SB19	Han Tae Soo; John Paulo Nase	Get in the Zone	2020	
"I Want You"	SB19	August Rigo; John Paulo Nase	Pagtatag!	2023	
"Ikako" ‡	SB19	John Paulo Nase	Pagsibol	2020	
"Ilaw"	SB19	John Paulo Nase	Pagtatag!	2023	
"In the Zone"	SB19, Xonara, and J2X	John Paulo Nase; Joshua Daniel Nase	None	2026	
"Kabataang Pinoy" ‡	Bini and SB19	Jazz Nicolas; Jonathan Manalo	None	2022	
"Kalakal" †	SB19 and Gloc-9	John Paulo Nase; Josh Cullen Santos; Stellvester Ajero; Felip Jhon Suson; Justin de Dios; Aristotle Pollisco	None	2024	
"Kapangyarihan"	Ben&Ben and SB19	Paolo Benjamin Guico; Miguel Benjamin Guico; John Paulo Nase	Pebble House, Vol. 1: Kuwaderno	2021	
"Ligaya" †	SB19	John Paulo Nase	None	2021	
"Liham"	SB19	John Paulo Nase	Pagtatag!	2023	
"Live It Up"	SB19	Joshua Daniel Nase	None	2021	
"Love Goes"	SB19	Kim Kyeong Su; Geong Seong Han; John Paulo Nase	Get in the Zone	2020	
"Love Yours" †	Ohwon Lee featuring SB19	John Paulo Nase; Ohwon Lee	Real Recognize Real	2021	
"Make It Merry, I-GCash Mo"	SB19	None credited	None	2025	
"Make Your Green Mark"	SB19	John Paulo Nase; Joshua Daniel Nase	None	2022	
"Mana"	SB19	John Paulo Nase	Pagsibol	2021	
"Mapa" (Note: SB19 and Ben&Ben recorded a remix of "Mapa" and released it as "Mapa (Band Version)" in 2021 as a non-album single.) †	SB19	John Paulo Nase	Pagsibol	2021	
"Memories"	SB19	Alawn; Elliot Lööf; Rasmus Palmgren; John Paulo Nase	Wakas at Simula	2026	
"Merry Munchkins" (SB19 version)	SB19	Edith Gallardo; Moy Ortiz	None	2021	
"Mga Kababayan"	SB19	Francis Magalona; Jimmy Antiporda	Forgotten Island (Original Motion Picture Soundtrack)	2026	
"Moonlight" †	Ian Asher, SB19, and Terry Zhong	Ian McNelley; Terry Zhong; Jackson Lee Morgan; Lenno Linjama; Sophie Pauline Curtis; Nick Cozine	None	2024	
"No Stopping You" (Note: SB19 and Jayda Avanzado recorded a remix of "No Stopping You" and released it in 2021 as a promotional single, which was also included in the soundtrack album Love at First Stream.) ‡	SB19	Richard Salazar	Love at First Stream	2021	
"Nyebe" †	SB19	John Paulo Nase	None	2022	
"The One"	SB19	Junesun Kim; John Paulo Nase	None	2021	
"Quit"	SB19	Felip Jhon Suson; John Paulo Nase	Simula at Wakas	2025	
"Ready" †	apl.de.ap and SB19	Arjen Thonen; Damien Leroy; Denzel Chain; Edgar Artek Sinio; Keith Harris; Allan Lindo	None	2024	
"Ready, Set, G!"	SB19	Teddy Katigbak; Thyro Alfaro	None	2022	
"Reset"	SB19 and Sandara Park	John Paulo Nase	None	2023	
"Shooting for the Stars"	SB19	August Rigo	Simula at Wakas	2025	
"SLMT"	SB19	John Paulo Nase	Pagsibol	2021	
"Tahanan"	SB19	John Paulo Nase; Joshua Daniel Nase; Luigi del Rosario	None	2025	
"Tara, Summer Na!"	SB19	None credited	None	2024	
"Team Tayo"	The Juans and SB19	None credited	None	2023	
"Tilaluha" †	SB19	Kim Kyeong Su; Geong Seong Han; John Paulo Nase	Get in the Zone	2018	
"Time"	SB19	Xerxes Bakker; John Paulo Nase; Samuel Akinbode	Simula at Wakas	2025	
"TM Doble Dekada (Samahang Pina-Easy)"	The Juans, SB19, Donnalyn, and Matthaios	None credited	None	2021	
"TM FunPasko (Samahang Pina-Easy)"	The Juans, SB19, and Donnalyn	None credited	None	2021	
"Together in Motion"	SB19	Jose Luis Ocampo; Anya Lagman	None	2026	
"Toyfriend" †	SB19 and Be:First	Alawn; Noerio; John Paulo Nase	Wakas at Simula	2026	
"Umaaligid" †	Sarah Geronimo and SB19	Adam Pondang; Joshua Daniel Nase; Robert Gerongco; Samuel Gerongco; Thyro Alfaro	None	2025	
"Visa" †	SB19	John Paulo Nase	Wakas at Simula	2026	
"Wag Mong Ikunot ang Iyong Noo"	SB19	Choi Chang Eon; John Paulo Nase	Get in the Zone	2020	
"Wakas"	SB19	John Paulo Nase; Joshua Daniel Nase; Joshua Caleb Vidamo; Luigi Del Rosario	Wakas at Simula	2026	
"We Wish You a Merry GCash"	SB19	None credited	None	2023	
"What?" †	SB19	John Paulo Nase	Pagsibol	2021	
"Win Your Heart" ‡	SB19	Nonong Pedero; Thyro Alfaro	None	2022	
"WYAT (Where You At)" †	SB19	John Paulo Nase	None	2022	
