= 14th PMPC Star Awards for Music =

- Show title card
- Date: April 25, 2024
- Venue: Virtual Award Ceremony
- Hosted by: Kris Lawrence; Laarni Lozada; Ethereal Diva
- Most wins: SB19 (7)

The 14th Star Awards for Music of the Philippine Movie Press Club (PMPC) was aired and livestreamed on Abante TV platforms on December 29, 2024, under the leadership of then-PMPC President Rodel Ocampo Fernando.

The PMPC Star Awards for Music was hosted by Kris Lawrence and Laarni Lozada.

== Winners ==
The following are the winners for the 14th PMPC Star Awards for Music, covering music released in 2021.

Winners only are listed first and in bold italics.

=== Major categories ===
Album of the Year	Song of the Year
**"Pagsibol" – SB19 (Sony Music Philippines)**; "Borbolen" – Parokya ni Edgar (Universal Records); "Episode" – Zack Tabudlo (Island Records Philippines); "Halfway Point" – Moira Dela Torre (Star Music); "MPowered" – Maymay Entrata (Star Music); "Pebble House, Vol. 1: Kuwaderno" – Ben&Ben (Sony Music Philippines); "Trophy" – Morissette (Underdog Music Philippines)	**"Mapa" – SB19 (Sony Music Philippines)**; "Amakabogera" – Maymay Entrata (Star Music); "Binibini" – Zack Tabudlo (Island Records Philippines); "Ikaw at Ako" – Moira Dela Torre and Jason Marvin (Star Music); "Nang Dumating Ka" – Bandang Lapis (Viva Records); "Tala" – Sarah Geronimo (Viva Records); "Paraluman" – Adie (O/C Records); "Sigurado" – Belle Mariano (Star Music)
Male Recording Artist of the Year	Female Recording Artist of the Year
**Zack Tabudlo – "Binibini" (Island Records Philippines)**; Arnel Pineda – "Cardo Dalisay" (Star Music and Tarsier Records); Arthur Nery – "Iisa Lang" (Viva Records); Erik Santos – "Sigaw ng Puso" (Star Music); Juan Karlos – "Boston" (Island Records Philippines); Mark Carpio – "Para Sa'yo Lang" (Viva Records); Rico Blanco – "Pinoy Ko" (Star Music and Tarsier Records)	**Ice Seguerra – "Wag Kang Aalis" (Universal Records)**; Angeline Quinto – "Huwag Kang Mangamba" (Star Music); Jona – "Init sa Magdamag" (Star Music and Tarsier Records); KZ Tandingan – "Dodong" (Star Music); Moira Dela Torre – "Ikaw at Ako" (Star Music); Morissette – "Shine" (Star Music and Tarsier Records); Yeng Constantino – "Kumapit" (Star Music)
New Male Recording Artist of the Year	New Female Recording Artist of the Year
**Diego Gutierrez– "On A Dream" (Hitmakers Entertainment)**; Dan Ombao – "Saranggola" (Star Music); Kelvin Miranda – "Slow Dance" (GMA Music); Lance Busa – "Ako Muna" (StarPop); Matt Lozano – "Walang Pipigil" (GMA Music); Mizael – "Wag Naman" (Universal Records); Red Atienza – "Pag-ibig Ko" (NA Entertainment)	**Gigi de Lana – "Sakalam" (Star Music)**; Angela Ken – "Ako Na Lang Muna" (Star Music); Anji Salvacion – "Keeps on Coming Back" (StarPop); Belle Mariano – "Sigurado" (Star Music); Bey – "Crash Landing" (Universal Records); Isang – "Okey Lang" (MCA Music); Jessica Villarubin – "Ako Naman" (GMA Music)
Duo/Group of the Year	New Group of the Year
**SB19 – "Mapa" (Sony Music Philippines)**; Ben&Ben – "Pasalubong" ((Sony Music Philippines)); The Itchyworms – "Eto Ang Maligayang Araw" (Sony Music Philippines); Lola Amour – "Closer Than Before" (Warner Music Philippines); Parokya ni Edgar – "Borbolen" (Universal Records); Sponge Cola – "Alamat" (Sony Music Philippines); The Juans – "Dulo" (Viva Records); This Band – "Wala Ka Nang Magagawa" (Viva Records)	**BGYO – "He's Into Her" (Star Music)**; Alamat – "Kbye" (Viva Records); Daydream – "Lumayo" (Warner Music Philippines); Greyline – "Hangganan" (Black Sheep Records); Hey June! – "Just A Hit" (Warner Music Philippines); Edrex Clyde Gonzales, director; Kaia – "Kaya" (Sony Music Philippines)
Music Video of the Year	
**"Bazinga" – SB19 (Sony Music Philippines)**; **Jonathan Placido, director**; "Amakabogera" – Maymay Entrata (Star Music); Amiel Kirby Balagtas, director; "Asa Naman" – Maris Racal (Star Music); Maris Racal and Rico Blanco, directors; "Dodong" – KZ Tandingan (Star Music); Niq Ablao, director; "Fix Me" – Jake Zyrus (Star Music); Edrex Clyde Gonzales, director; "Soda" – James Reid (Careless); Judd Figuerres, director; "The Light" – BGYO (Star Music); Kring Kim, director	

=== Pop category ===
Pop Album of the Year	Male Pop Artist of the Year
**"Pagsibol" – SB19 (Sony Music Philippines)**; "Bitaw Na" – Jmko (Star Music); "Daylight" – Belle Mariano (Star Music); "Golden Arrow" – Bini (Star Music); "Kbye" – Alamat (Viva Records); "Morissette 14: Vol. 2" – Morissette (Flasher Factory); "The Light" – BGYO (Star Music)	**Darren Espanto – "Tama Na" (MCA Music)**; Garrett Bolden – "Our Love" (GMA Music); Iñigo Pascual – "Neverland" (Star Music and Tarsier Records); KD Estrada – "Saves It" (Star Music); Marlo Mortel – "Ready ro Start" (PolyEast Records); Sam Concepcion – "Diwata" (Star Music and Tarsier Records)
Female Pop Artist of the Year	
**Nadine Lustre – "Wait for Me" (Careless Music)**; Belle Mariano – "Daylight" (Star Music); Catriona Gray – "R.Y.F." (Star Music); Gigi de Lana – "Bakit Nga Ba Mahal Kita" (Star Music and Tarsier Records); Jayda Avanzado – "Paano Kung Naging Tayo" (Star Music); Kim Chiu – "Kimi" (Star Music and StarPop); Maymay Entrata – "Amakabogera" (Star Music)	

=== Acoustic, Folk, Hip hop, Rock and RnB category ===
Acoustic Album of the Year	Male Acoustic Artist of the Year
**"Kuwento Sa Silid" – Janine Teñoso (Viva Records)**; "Halfway Point" – Moira Dela Torre (Star Music); "Sunsets and Heaven" – Sab (Star Music)	**Adie – "Paraluman" (O/C Records)**; Fern – "Kagandahan" (Island Records Philippines); Jason Marvin – "Ikaw at Ako" (Star Music); Mizael – "Wag Naman" (Universal Records)
Female Acoustic Artist of the Year	Inspirational Song of the Year
**Angela Ken – "Ako Na Lang Muna" (Star Music)**; Arra San Agustin – "Walang Makakapigil" (GMA Music); Bianca Lipana – "Minsan" (Sony Music Philippines); Janine Teñoso – "Paano" (Viva Records); Keiko Necesario – "Gabi" Warner Music Philippines; Moira Dela Torre – "Ikaw at Ako" (Star Music); Shawntel – "Pop Goes My Pretty Big Heart" (Star Music)	**"Do You Have a Miracle for Me" – Alisah Bonaobra (RJA Productions); and**; **"Huwag Kang Mangamba" – Angeline Quinto (Star Music) (tied)**; "Awit ng Misyon" – Jamie Rivera (Star Music); "Kumapit Ka" – Yeng Constantino (Star Music); "Makinig Ka" – Dindo Fernandez (Danish Khonstrukt, Inc.); "Wag Kang Aalis" – Ice Seguerra (Universal Records); "Yakap" – Bernadette Sembrano (Star Music)
Rock Album of the Year	Rock Artist of the Year
**"Borbolen" – Parokya ni Edgar (Universal Records)**; "Convalescence" – JM de Guzman (Star Music); "Kyusi" – Zild Benitez (Balcony Entertainment); "Pack of Make Believe" – 10 a.m. Departure (Island Records Philippines)	**Juan Karlos – "Boston" (MCA Music)**; JM de Guzman – "Convalescence" (Star Music); Lola Amour – "Closer than Before" (Warner Music Philippines); Parokya ni Edgar – "Borbolen" (Universal Records); Rico Blanco – "Pinoy Ako" (Star Music and Tarsier Records); Sponge Cola – "Alamat" (Sony Music Philippines); Zild Benitez – "Kyusi" (Balcony Entertainment)
RnB Album of the Year	Male RnB Artist of the Year
**"Episode" – Zack Tabudlo (Island Records Philippines)**; "Don't Quote Me" – Dia Maté (Island Records Philippines); "Isa Lang" – Arthur Nery (Viva Records); "Night Drives" – KVN (The Orchard Music); "Options" – Iñigo Pascual (Star Music and Tarsier Records); "Para Sa'yo (EP)" – Quest (Warner Music Philippines); "Soon to Be" – Clien (Viva Records)	**Arthur Nery – "Isa Lang" (Viva Records)**; Bugoy Drilon – "'Wag Mo Akong Iwan Mag-isa" (Star Music); Daryl Ong – "Bitaw" (Viva Records); Iñigo Pascual – "Neverland" (Star Music and Tarsier Records); Jeremiah Tiangco – "Sa Tuwing Umuulan" (GMA Music); John Roa – "Tawag Lang" (Viva Records); Zack Tabudlo – "Binibini" (Island Records Philippines)
Female RnB Artist of the Year	Hip hop Album of the Year
**Katrina Velarde – "Sa Panahinip" (Viva Records)**; Dia Maté – "Faded" (Island Records Philippines); Elha Nympha – "Do It" (MCA Music); Jikamarie – "Lutang" (Warner Music Philippines); Karencitta – "Anoona" (Viva Records); Leah Halili – "Fourth of July" (Independent); Loir – "Sky" (Sony Music Philippines)	**"Pagbigkas" – Dicta License (Warner Music Philippines)**; "Alex Bruce: Self Titled album" – Alex Bruce (Sony Music Philippines); "Baby Ko Si Kulot" – Guthben Duo feat. Tyrone (Independent); "Get This Bread Part II" – Nobrvnd (Warner Music Philippines); "Know Me" – 8 Ballin' (UMG Philippines)
Hip hop Artist of the Year	Novelty Song of the Year
**John Rendez – "Not Superman" (Independent)**; DJ Loonyo – "Bakit" (Universal Records); Flow G – "Ibong Adarna" (Viva Records); Gloc-9 – "Tablan" (Independent); Kritiko – "Tama Ko'y Mali (Star Music and Tarsier Records); Matthaios – "You Rock" (Midas Records); Shanti Dope – ""Peekaboo" (Universal Records)	**"Amakabogera" – Maymay Entrata (Star Music and StarPop)**; "Ate Sandali" – Maris Racal (Sony Music Philippines); "Crush Kong Curly" – Wilbert Ross (Viva Records); "Inutil" – Madam Inutz (Independent); "Landiin Nyo Na Ako" – Eugene Layug (O/C Records); "May Himala" – Ate Gay (Star Music and Tarsier Records); "WKT" – Alex Gonzaga (Star Music and Tarsier Records)
Novelty Artist of the Year	Folk/Country Song of the Year
**Maymay Entrata– "Amakabogera" (Star Music and StarPop)**; Alex Gonzaga – "WKT" (Star Music and Tarsier Records); Ate Gay – "May Himala" (Star Music and Tarsier Records); Eugene Layug – "Landiin Nyo Na Ako" (O/C Records); Madam Inutz – "Inutil" (Independent); Maris Racal – "Ate Sandali" (Sony Music Philippines); Wilbert Ross – "Crush Kong Curly" (Viva Records)	**"Dodong" – KZ Tandingan (Star Music)**; "Inday" – TJ Monterde (PolyEast Records); "Leron Leron Sinta" – Debonair District (Warner Music Philippines); "Pasalubong" – Ben&Ben (Sony Music Philippines); "Tulog Na" – Muri (Warner Music Philippines)
Collaboration of the Year	
**"Ikaw at Ako" – Moira Dela Torre and Jason Marvin (Star Music)**; "Bakit" – DJ Loonyo feat. Gloc-9 (Universal Records); "Hoy Love You" – Regine Velasquez and Ogie Alcasid (Star Music); "Ibong Adarna" – Flow G feat. Gloc-9 (Viva Records); "Lunod" – Ben&Ben feat. Zild Benitez and Juan Karlos (Sony Music Philippines); "Puso Ko'y Laan" – Gene Juanich and Michael Laygo (MG Records); "You Rock" – Matthaios feat. Michael Pacquiao (Midas Records)	

=== Album category ===
Dance Album of the Year	Revival Album of the Year
**"Bazinga" – SB19 (Sony Music Philippines)**; "Fool No Mo" – AC Bonifacio (Star Music); "Kasmala" – Alamat (Viva Records); "The Light" – BGYO (Star Music); "Golden Arrow" – Bini (Star Music); "Amakabogera" – Maymay Entrata (Star Music); "All That" – Ylona Garcia (88rising)	**"Paano" – InnerVoices (Saturno Music)**; "All Out of Love" – Iñigo Pascual (Star Music and Tarsier Records); "Ang Pag-ibig Kong Ito" – Rachel Alejandro (Star Music); "Bakit Nga Ba Mahal Kita" – Gigi de Lana (Star Music); "Ikaw Lang At Ako" – Papa Obet (GMA Music); "Init sa Magdamag" – Jona (Star Music); "Sabi Mo" – Sheryn Regis (Star Music)
Compilation Album of the Year	
**"FPJ's Ang Probinsyano" – Various artists (Star Music)**; "Awit Kapuso Vol. 12" - Various artists (GMA Music); "Awit Kapuso Vol. 13" - Various artists (GMA Music); "Heart of Asia (Best of AsiaNovela Theme Songs" - Various artists (GMA Music); "Himig Handog 11th Edition" – Various artists (Star Music); "OPM Fresh Songwriters Edition Vol. 1" - Various artists (Star Music); "Rachel Alejandro: The Great OPM Songbook Vol. 1" – Rachel Alejandro (Star Music)	

=== Concert category ===
Concert of the Year	Male Concert Performer of the Year
**"Freedom" – Regine Velasquez (ABS-CBN Events)**; **Frank Lloyd Mamaril and Paolo Valenciano, directors**; "L'Art de Sheree" – Sheree Bautista (Independent); "Limitless" – Julie Anne San Jose (GMA Network); Paolo Valenciano, director; "Love United" – Sheryn Regis (Mak Entertainment); "MPowered" – Maymay Entrata (ABS-CBN Events); Alco Guerrero, director; "Tala: The Film Concert" – Sarah Geronimo (Viva Communications); Paul Basinillo, director; "YouTube Night: Hearts on Fire" – Juris and Jed Madela	**Ogie Alcasid – "Virtually Yours, Kilabotitos"**; Ely Buendia – "Superproxies"; Ian Veneracion – "Virtually Yours, Kilabotitos"; Jed Madela – "Royals"; Gary Valenciano – "Gary V. Presents"; Jed Madela – "YouTube Night: Hearts on Fire"
Female Concert Performer of the Year	Dupo/Group Concert of the Year
**Regine Velasquez – "Freedom"**; Jona – "YouTube Night: Hearts on Fire"; Julie Anne San Jose – "Limitless"; Juris – "YouTube Night: Hearts on Fire"; Maymay Entrata – "MPowered"; Sarah Geronimo – "Tala: The Film Concert"; Sheryn Regis – "Love United"	**SB19 – Our Zone: SB19 Third Anniversary Concert (ShowBT Entertainment)**; Ben&Ben – Ben&Ben Live (Ben&Ben Music Productions and Smart Communications); Neocolours – Tuloy Pa Rin: A Fundraising Virtual Concert (UP College of Law); South Border – The South Border Reunion Concert (Chooks-to-Go and MPBL)

=== Special awards ===
**Pilita Corrales Lifetime Achievement Award**
- **Hajji Alejandro**
**Gawad Parangal Levi Celerio**
- **Rey Valera**
