= Simula at Wakas: Kickoff Concert Album =

Live album by SB19
- Released: January 30, 2026
- Recorded: May 31, 2025 – June 1, 2025
- Venues: Philippine Arena, Bocaue, Bulacan, Philippines
- Length: 89:36
- Languages: English; Tagalog
- Label: Sony Philippines
- Producer: Jem Florendo

SB19 chronology
Simula at Wakas (2025)	Simula at Wakas: Kickoff Concert Album (2026)	Wakas at Simula (2026)

Simula at Wakas: Kickoff Concert Album is a live album by the Filipino boy band SB19. It was released on January 30, 2026, through Sony Music Philippines. It consists of 20 tracks, all of which were originally released on the extended play (EP) Simula at Wakas (2025), Pagtatag! (2023), and Pagsibol (2022). The live album was recorded during the group's world tour Simula at Wakas World Tour at the Philippine Arena in Bulacan on May 31 and June 1, 2025.

== Background and release ==
On November 10, 2025, SB19 released the song "Burn the Flame" in collaboration with Honor of Kings as the official anthem for its International Championship. In December, their Wikipedia article ranked second most viewed in the Filipino pop music category.

On January 30, 2026, they released Simula at Wakas: Kickoff Concert Album on all music streaming platforms through Sony Music Philippines. The album documents performances from their world tour Simula at Wakas, held in May 31 to June 1, 2025, at the Philippine Arena in Bulacan.

== Composition ==
The live album contains 20 tracks and was mixed and mastered by Radkidz, with live arrangements by Jem Florendo. Its tracklist includes songs originally released on Simula at Wakas (2025), Pagtatag! (2023), and Pagsibol (2022), as well as a live redention of the 2024 single "Moonlight", which was originally produced in collaboraion with Ian Asher and Chinese electronic producer Terry Zhong.

== Track listing ==
Simula at Wakas: Kickoff Concert Album track listing
No.	Title	Writer(s)	Producer(s)	Length
1.	"Prologue"	SB19	Jem Florendo	3:32
2.	"What?"	Florendo; Pablo	Josue; Durias; Pablo; Servida	4:13
3.	"Mana"	Pablo; Florendo	Jay Durias; Josue; Pablo; Simon Servida	3:24
4.	"Gento"	Josue; Pablo	Josue; Pablo	4:24
5.	"Moonlight" (with Terry Zhong)	Ian McNelley; Jackson Lee Morgan; Florendo; Lenno Linjama; Nick Cozine; Sophie Pauline Curtis; Terry Zhong	Linjama; Zhong	4:11
6.	"I Want You"	August Rigo; Florendo; Pablo	Rigo	3:44
7.	"WYAT (Where You At)"	Josue; Pablo	Josue; Pablo	6:41
8.	"Dungka!"	Josue; Pablo	Josue; Pablo	3:52
9.	"Bazinga!"	Josue; Pablo	Josue; Pablo	3:37
10.	"8TonBall"	Alawn; Benji Bae; Florendo; Josh Cullen	Alawn	4:13
11.	"Crimzone"	Felip; Florendo; Cullen; Josue; Pablo	Servida	4:39
12.	"Nyebe"	Florendo; Pablo	Pablo; Thyro Alfaro	6:07
13.	"Time"	Florendo; Pablo; Samuel Akinbode; Xerxes Bakker	Pablo; Bakker	3:56
14.	"Ilaw"	Florendo; Pablo	Brian Lotho; Josue; Len Calvo; Pablo	5:57
15.	"Quit"	Felip; Florendo; Pablo	Felip; Luke April	4:46
16.	"Mapa"	Florendo; Pablo	Durias; Pablo; Servida	3:37
17.	"Shooting for the Stars"	Rigo; Florendo	Rigo	4:03
18.	"Freedom"	Florendo; Pablo	Oh-won Lee	4:20
19.	"Slmnt"	Pablo; Florendo	Pablo; Servida	6:38
20.	"Dam"	Pablo; Josue; Florendo; Servida	Josue; Pablo; Servida	4:13
Total length:				89:96

Notes

- All tracks except track 5 are subtitled "Simula at Wakas Tour Kickoff".

== Charts ==
Chart performance for Simula at Wakas: Kick Off Concert Album
Chart (2026)	Peak position
UK Album Downloads (Official Charts)	68
