= Simula at Wakas (disambiguation) =

Simula at Wakas is a 2025 extended play by SB19.

Simula at Wakas may also refer to:

- Simula at Wakas World Tour, a 2025 concert tour by SB19
- Simula at Wakas: Kickoff Concert Album, a 2026 live album by SB19

== See also ==
- Simula, a name of two stimulation languages by Ole-Johan Dahl and Kristen Nygaard
- Wakas at Simula, 2026 studio album by SB19
