= Surreal =

Surreal may refer to:

== Music ==
- Surreal (album), by Man Raze, 2008
- "Surreal" (Ayumi Hamasaki song), 2000
- "Surreal" (Justin de Dios song), 2024
- "Surreal", a song by Luísa Sonza from Escândalo Íntimo, 2023

== Other uses ==
- Surreal (cereal), a brand of breakfast cereal
- Surreal humour
- Surreal numbers, a superset of the real numbers in mathematics
- Surreal Software, an American video game studio

== See also ==
- Surrealism
