= Emoji (disambiguation) =

An emoji is a symbol often used as an emotional cue in text.

Emoji may also refer to:

- "Emoji" (song), a song by SB19 and Jolin Tsai
- "Emoji", a song by Ronny J and XXXTentacion
- "Emoji", a song by Au/Ra
- "Emoji", a song by Galantis
