= Visa (SB19 song) =

Single by SB19

from the album Wakas at Simula
- Language: Filipino
- Released: February 20, 2026
- Genre: Dance-pop
- Length: 3:43
- Label: 1Z; Sony Philippines
- Songwriter: John Paulo Nase
- Producers: John Paulo Nase, Joshua Daniel Nase

SB19 singles chronology
"Umaaligid" (2025)	"Visa" (2026)	"Emoji" (2026)

Music video
- "Visa" on YouTube

"Visa" is a song by Filipino boy band SB19. It was released on February 20, 2026, by 1Z Entertainment under the distribution of Sony Music Philippines, and as the band's first single of the year. The band's leader, Pablo, co-wrote and co-produced the song with Joshua Daniel Nase. The song has been described as dance-pop that focuses on the problems Filipinos experience when applying for visas, including artists, athletes, and Overseas Filipino Workers. The song is nominated as a Best Asian Pop Music Performance alongside "Unang Kilig" by Bini in the 69th Annual Grammy Awards.

== Background and release ==
Following their 2025 collaboration single "Umaaligid" with Sarah Geronimo, SB19 announced their return in early 2026 by posting a short audio clip of "Visa" on their official TikTok account. The teaser showed the song is about the problems Filipinos face when applying for visas. On their social media pages, the band explained the meaning of their teaser posts showing passports, plane tickets, and the letter "V". They also shared an updated poster of the letter "V" with a "denied" stamp and announced their new single, titled "Visa". This was highlighted after their Simula at Wakas World Tour, at a time when the Philippine passport was ranked 73rd in the world, allowing entry to only 64 visa-free countries.

"Visa" was released on digital platforms at 12 A.M. (PHT) on February 20, followed by a music video at noon. In the video, Stell, Justin, Pablo, Josh, and Felip undergo a tedious visa application process only to face denial. Ninong Ry appears as a band member, and Poca plays the visa officer. The single followed their January 2026 release of Simula at Wakas: Kickoff Concert Album, a live recording of tracks performed at the Philippine Arena during their two-day concert in May 2025. SB19 concluded their Simula at Wakas World Tour with the final show titled Wakas At Simula: The Trilogy Concert Finale on April 18 at the SMDC Festival Grounds.

== Composition and lyrics ==
"Visa" was written and co-produced by the band's leader, Pablo, along with his brother Joshua Daniel Nase. Musically, the song is a dance-pop track that includes pop hooks, rap sections, and layered production. The lyrics focus on the obstacles that make life harder for Filipinos to work or perform abroad, even when they represent the country internationally.

The song was inspired by the band experiences during their Simula at Wakas world tour. Pablo said they hope the song will encourage changes that make it easier for Filipino artists, athletes, and professionals to get visas. Josh and Justin compared the situation to Filipino athletes who work hard for the country but still face challenges with Visa processes. He also mentioned several personalities of Filipino heritage in the lyrics, including WWE retired professional wrestler and Filipino-American actor Dave Bautista, Dante Basco, Manny Jacinto, Olivia Rodrigo, Bruno Mars, Nico Santos, and Jo Koy.

== Reception ==
=== Commercial performance ===
Following its release on February 20, "Visa" debuted at number six on the US World Digital Song Sales of the American magazine Billboard.

== Credits and personnel ==
Credits adapted from Apple Music.

Musicians

- John Paulo Nase – songwriting, producer

Production

- Joshua Daniel Nase – producer
- Emil Dela Rosa – mastering engineer, mixing engineer
- Jacques Jenkins – mastering engineer

== Charts ==
Chart performance for "Visa"
Chart (2026)	Peak position
Philippines Hot 100 (Billboard Philippines)	60
US World Digital Song Sales (Billboard)	6

== Accolades ==
Award	Year	Category	Result	Ref.
Grammy Awards	2027	Best Asian Pop Music Performance	Pending	
