= Wakas at Simula =

Studio album by SB19
- Released: March 27, 2026
- Length: 96:22
- Languages: English; Tagalog
- Label: Sony Philippines

SB19 chronology
Simula at Wakas: Kickoff Concert Album (2026)	Wakas at Simula (2026)

Singles from Wakas at Simula
- 1. "Visa" Released: February 20, 2026; 2. "Emoji" Released: March 27, 2026

Wakas at Simula (lit. 'End and Beginning') is the second studio album by Filipino boy band SB19. The album was released on March 27, 2026, by Sony Music Philippines. It contains tracks from their trilogy of extended plays Pagsibol, Pagtatag!, Simula at Wakas and six new original tracks.

== Background ==
The Filipino boy band SB19 released their first EP, Pagsibol, in 2021, exploring genres such as pop rock, hip-hop, and EDM, departing from the dance-pop production from their debut studio album, Get in the Zone (2020). Pagsibol became part of a trilogy of EPs, which focuses on the evolution of the band's artistry. In 2023, the group released their second EP, Pagtatag!, the trilogy's second installment. After taking a break to focus on their solo careers, in 2025, SB19 released Simula at Wakas, the trilogy's third and final installment. All the main tracks for their trilogy of EPs would be included in Wakas at Simula. According to the band, all songs from their EP Pagsibol was re-recorded as part of their new perspective developed over five years.

== Release and promotion ==
On January 1, 2026, SB19 announced that the band would stage Wakas at Simula: The Trilogy Concert Finale on April 18, 2026, at the SMDC Festival Grounds in Parañaque. On February 20, they released the first single "Visa". On February 28, 2026, SB19 announced that their next album, titled Wakas at Simula, would be released on March 27, 2026. On the same day as the album's release, they released the second single "Emoji".

== Track listing ==
Simula at Wakas track listing
No.	Title	Writer(s)	Producer(s)	Length
1.	"Visa"	John Paulo Nase	John Paulo Nase; Joshua Daniel Nase	3:43
2.	"Memories"	Alawn; Elliot Loof; J.P Nase; Rasmus Palmgren	Alawn	3:40
3.	"Toyfriend" (with Be:First)	Alawn; J.P Nase; Noerio	Alawn	3:21
4.	"Everblack"	Felip Jhon Suson; J.P Nase	Suson; Joshua Caleb Vidamo; Luke April	3:11
5.	"Emoji" (with Jolin Tsai)	Chendy; Suson; J.D Nase; Jolin; J.P Nase	Suson; April	4:01
6.	"Wakas"	Vidamo; J.D Nase; J.P Nase; Luigi Del Rosario	Jacques Jenkins; J.P Nase; Del Rosario	5:26
7.	"What? (Note: Re-recorded and extended version)"	J.P. Nase	John Paulo Nase; Joshua Daniel Nase; Simon Servida; Jay Durias	5:16
8.	"Mapa (Note: Re-recorded version)"	J.P. Nase	John Paulo Nase; Simon Servida; Jay Durias	4:10
9.	"Mana"	J.P. Nase	John Paulo Nase; Simon Servida	4:05
10.	"Bazinga"	J.P. Nase	John Paulo Nase; Simon Servida	3:15
11.	"Ikako"	J.P. Nase	John Paulo Nase; Thyro Alfaro	3:56
12.	"SLMT"	J.P. Nase	John Paulo Nase; Simon Servida	3:17
13.	"Gento"	J.P. Nase	J.P. Nase; Joshua Daniel Nase; Simon Servida	3:52
14.	"I Want You"	August Rigo; J.P. Nase	Rigo	3:43
15.	"Crimzone"	J.P. Nase; J.D. Nase; Suson; Josh Cullen Santos	Servida	3:49
16.	"Ilaw"	J.P. Nase	Brian Lotho; Len Calvo; J.P. Nase; J.D. Nase	4:52
17.	"Liham"	J.P. Nase	Lotho; Calvo; J.P. Nase; J.D. Nase	6:24
18.	"Freedom"	J.P. Nase; J.D. Nase	Ohwon Lee	3:31
19.	"Dam"	J.P. Nase; J.D. Nase; Simon Servida	J.P. Nase; J.D. Nase; Servida	3:29
20.	"Time"	Xerxes Bakker; Samuel Akinbode; J.P. Nase	Bakker; J.P. Nase	3:44
21.	"8TonBall"	Benji Bae; Santos; Alawn	Alawn	3:28
22.	"Quit"	Suson; J.P. Nase	Suson; Luke April	4:43
23.	"Shooting for the Stars"	Rigo	Rigo	3:56
24.	"Dungka!"	J.P. Nase; J.D. Nase	J.P. Nase; J.D. Nase	3:35
Total length:				96:32

== Charts ==
Chart performance for Wakas at Simula
Chart (2026)	Peak position
Japanese Digital Albums (Oricon)	41
Japanese Download Albums (Billboard Japan)	38
Japanese Top Albums Sales (Billboard Japan)	34
Japanese Western Albums (Oricon)	15
UK Album Downloads (Official Charts)	31
