= Justin (Filipino musician) =

Filipino singer-songwriter (born 1998)

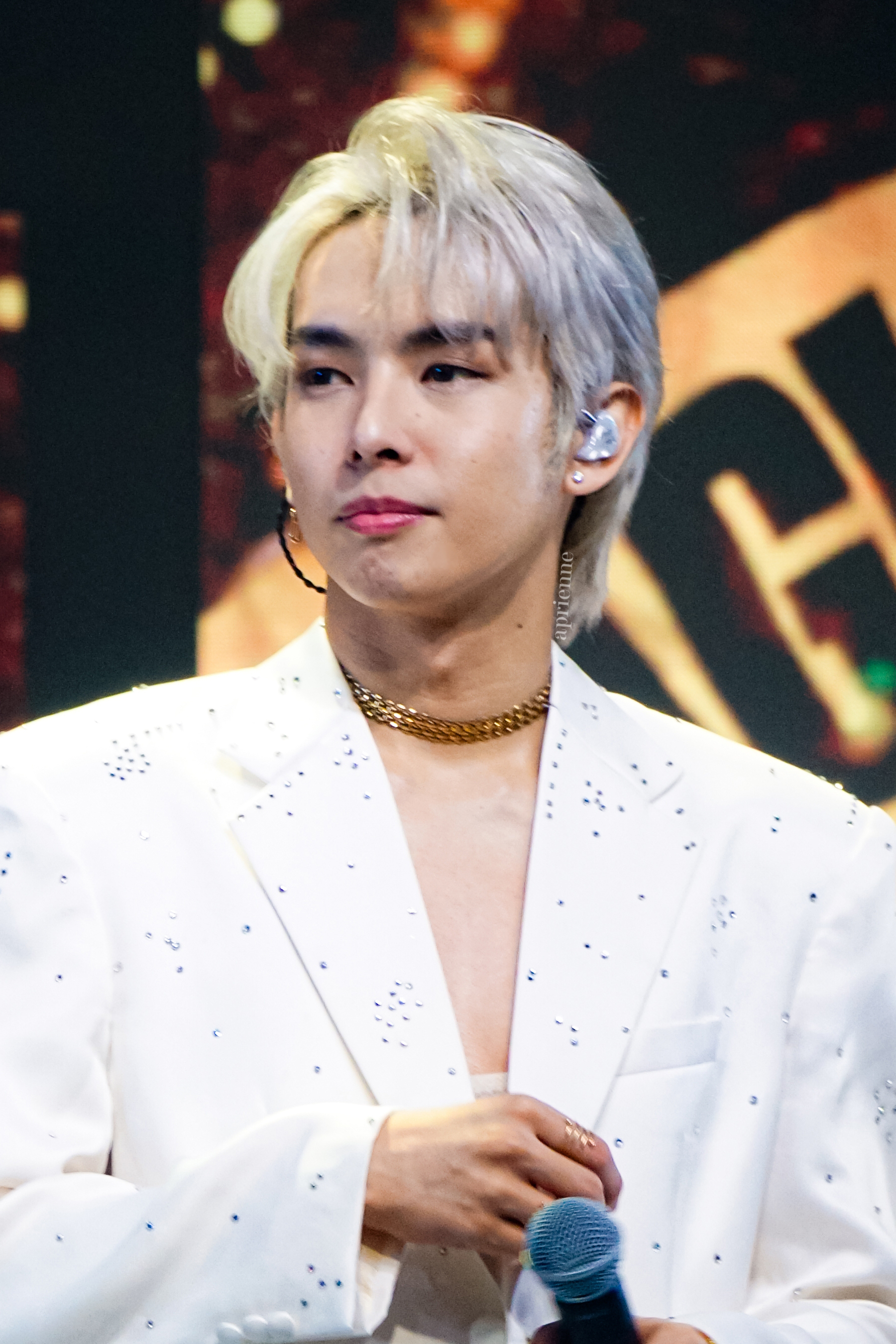
- Justin in 2023
- Born: Justin de Dios; July 7, 1998 (age 28); Valenzuela, Philippines
- Education: De La Salle–College of Saint Benilde
- Occupations: Singer; Dancer; Songwriter; Creative Director; Director; CEO (Visar Society)
- Years active: 2018–present
- Musical career
- Genres: P-pop, Pop
- Labels: 1Z; Sony Philippines; ShowBT (formerly)
- Member of: SB19

Justin de Dios (born July 7, 1998), known mononymously as Justin, is a Filipino performer, songwriter, visual artist, director, and actor. He is the main visual and sub-vocalist of the Filipino boy band SB19, which debuted in 2018. The group's initial struggles gave way to sudden success after they went viral in 2019, and their discography includes the album Get in the Zone (2020) and two extended plays (EPs). As SB19's creative director, Justin has directed several of their music videos and spearheaded their 2021 online concert Back in the Zone. He also directed the music videos for his solo songs "Kaibigan" (transl. Friend) and "Surreal", as well as "Misteryoso" (transl. Mysterious) by Cup of Joe.

In 2024, Justin made his acting debut as Jared in the mystery teen drama in Senior High. He played the role of Ec'naad in the 2025 fantasy series Encantadia Chronicles: Sang'gre.

== Early life and education ==
Justin de Dios was born on July 7, 1998 and grew up in Malabon, Metro Manila. Before SB19 was formed, Justin was in a dance crew with future bandmate Josh. In 2018, he graduated with honors from De La Salle–College of Saint Benilde with a degree in Multimedia Arts.

== Career ==
=== 2016–2020: Beginnings of SB19 ===
ShowBT Philippines, a subsidiary of Korean company ShowBT, was conducting a talent search which would ultimately lead to the formation of SB19. Justin had only been doing a ShowBT dance workshop, but ended up becoming one of their trainees after auditioning for multiple companies. The candidates went to a rigorous South Korean-style training camp, which included vocal and dance classes, physical training and "personality development". Justin was simultaneously studying for his college degree. He found it difficult balancing studying and training, and he sometimes had to skip training to work on his thesis and learn the choreography by himself afterwards. At one point, he almost dropped out of college; his brother later said he cried in his room over having to decide. In 2016, the five members of SB19, include Justin, were selected.

On October 26, 2018, SB19 debuted with their single "Tilaluha" (lit. 'Tearful'). It was followed by their second single "Go Up". Their act was largely influenced by K-pop. Going by his mononym Justin, he is the band's sub-vocalists and creative director. The youngest member of the group, he has been dubbed their "visual", or most attractive member. In their first year, the band became disheartened because they received little attention. They were considering giving up on the band before their dance practice video for "Go Up" went viral in 2019, leading their leader Sejun (now Pablo) to call it their "redemption song". SB19 released a third single, "Alab (Burning)", before their debut studio album Get in the Zone came out on July 31, 2020. Get in the Zone was highly anticipated by their newfound fanbase, which was dubbed A'TIN (pronounced 'eighteen'). Justin wrote and directed the animated music video of "Hanggang sa Huli" (lit. 'Until the End'), one of the album's tracks.

=== 2021–2023: Wider success ===
Justin made a cameo appearance in the music video for Filipino rapper Alex Bruce's song "Yakap", released on February 5, 2021, playing Bruce's crush. In March 2021, Justin storyboarded and directed the music video for SB19's single "What?". The group became the first Filipino act to be nominated for a Billboard Music Award when they became a contender for the fan-voted category Top Social Artist. On July 22, 2021, SB19 released their first extended play (EP), Pagsibol (lit. 'Growth' or 'Sprouting'). Justin later co-led the EP's merchandise campaign, offering input on artists Irmay Ledesma and Bea Zaragoza's designs. SB19 began August with their online concert Back in the Zone, which was so well-received that it led to a replay. Justin directed the concert and did a solo performance covering Coldplay's song "The Scientist".

In May 2022, Justin surpassed one million followers on the social media platform TikTok and shared an unreleased original song titled "Parellel Universe". In July, he and members of his friends and family started Visar Society, a business selling products with a "nature-like aesthetic". He directed the music video for SB19's single "WYAT (Where You At)". The band's first world tour in late 2022 was named after the track. At the 2022 PPOP Awards, Justin was named Pop Main Visual of the Year.

On May 19, 2023, SB19 released "Gento", the lead single off their second EP Pagtatag! (lit. 'Establishment'). The song was a commercial success, while its popularity on TikTok helped introduce SB19 to viewers in other countries, such as the United States. Pagtatag! was released on June 9. That month, SB19 became self-managed after they established the company 1Z Entertainment.

=== 2024–present: Solo debut ===
Justin debuted as a solo artist on February 29, releasing his first single titled "Surreal".

In 2024, Justin made his acting debut in the mystery teen drama Senior High as Jared, the prom date of Sanya (Gela Atayde). In 2025, he was cast in Encantadia Chronicles: Sang'gre in a special role.

== Discography ==
=== Songwriting credits ===
Year	Artist(s)	Song	Album	Lyricist		Composer	
Year	Artist(s)	Song	Album	Credited	With	Credited	With
2024	Justin	"Kaibigan"	Non-album singles	Yes	—N/a	Yes	—N/a
2024	Justin	"Surreal"	Non-album singles	Yes	—N/a	Yes	—N/a

== Videography ==
=== Television ===
Year	Title	Role	Notes	Ref.
2024	Senior High	Jared		
2025	Encantadia Chronicles: Sang'gre	Ec'naad	Special participation	

=== As director ===
Year	Title	Length	Ref.
2020	"Hanggang sa Huli"	4:50	
2021	"What?"	5:23	
2022	"WYAT (Where You At)"	4:53	
2023	"Gento"	4:04	
2024	"surreal"	4:17	
2024	"MOONLIGHT"	3:03	
2024	"Room"	5:08	
2024	"kaibigan"	7:41	
2024	"Misteryoso"	5:44	
2026	"Tabi"	3:35	
2026	"dahon"	4:41	

=== Music videos ===
Title	Year	Director(s)	Ref.
"Habangbuhay Pansamantala" (with Maki)	2026	Ingrid Ignacio-Termulo	

== Awards and nominations ==
Name of the award ceremony, year presented, award category, nominee(s) of the award, and the result of the nomination
Award ceremony	Year	Category	Nominee(s)/work(s)	Result	Ref.
P-pop Music Awards	2022	Best Visual of the Year	Justin	Won	
Village Pipol Choice Award	2023	Male TikTok Face of the Year	Justin	Nominated	
TAG Awards Chicago	2023	TAG 25 Under 25, Batch of 2023 Honorary Inductee	Justin	Won	
The Netizens Report	2022	Top 20 Most Significant and Influential Asian Celebrities	Justin	3rd	
The Netizens Report	2023	The Most Handsome Filipino in 2023	Justin	Won	
MYX Music Awards 2024	2024	Mellow Video of the Year	surreal	Won	
2025 Filipino Music Awards	2025	Folk Song of the Year	Sampung Mga Daliri	Won	
Awit Awards 2025	2025	Favorite Music Video of the Year	surreal	Won	
Awit Awards 2025	2025	Favorite Record of the Year	kaibigan	Won	
