= Surreal (cereal) =

Brand of breakfast cereal

- Type: Cereal
- Inventor: Jac Chetland; Kit Gammell
- Inception: Late 2021
- Available: Yes

Surreal is a brand of breakfast cereal launched in late 2021 founded in the UK by Jac Chetland and Kit Gammell. They have been listed by Selfridges, Holland & Barrett, Booths, Muscle Food, Amazon, Sainsbury's, Waitrose, Ocado, and Co-op Food.

Surreal was launched using money from employee shares and their own savings. Chetland and Gammell had previously been the seventh and ninth UK employees of Vita Coco, where they had run sales in Europe and marketing. Gammell is the son of Bill Gammell. In an interview with The Standard, the pair said that they set up the business as they felt that "tasty cereals" were "full of sugar" and that "healthy cereals" tasted "like cardboard". Subsequent market research showed demand for a cereal that was high-protein and zero-sugar. The pair spent the COVID-19 pandemic producing marketing content for social media.

The brand launched with four flavours: cocoa, cinnamon, frosted, and peanut butter. Their first sale was to the head of product development for Kellogg's and their first listing was in Selfridges. By July 2022, they had introduced their mascot, a grinning face with a cereal bowl for a mouth; that month, they launched an ad campaign lampooning the well-known cereal mascots Tony the Tiger, Coco the Monkey, and Snap, Crackle, and Pop. Around this time, they hired Innocent Drinks copywriter John Thornton as a senior creative.

The firm ran an ad campaign in March 2023 citing endorsements by people with the same names as celebrities Serena Williams, Dwayne Johnson, Ronaldo, and Michael Jordan and an ad campaign in July 2024 featuring Neil Burgess as Gary Scott, a parody of the unruly Cillit Bang salesperson Barry Scott. From August 2024, Surreal frequently partnered with non-cereal firms to release new lines: that month with fitness firm Gymshark to launch a line tasting of strawberry milkshake, Cardi-O's; in April 2025 with sex toy firm Lovehoney to launch a line that came with a free Silver Magic Bullet vibrator, Dild-O's; and in November 2025 with coffee firm Grind & Co. to launch a line tasting of tiramisu. Earthling Studio redesigned the brand's packaging in November 2025; subsequent adverts mocked the rebrand's subtlety.
