= Surreal (Justin de Dios song) =

Single by Justin de Dios
- Released: February 28, 2024
- Genre: Folk-pop; ballad
- Length: 4:00
- Label: Sony Philippines
- Songwriter: Justin de Dios
- Producers: Radkidz (Pablo and Josue)

Justin de Dios singles chronology
"Surreal" (2024)	"Sunday Morning" (2024)

Music video
- "surreal" on YouTube

"Surreal" (stylized in all lowercase) is a song by Filipino singer and SB19 member Justin de Dios. It was released as a digital single on February 28, 2024, through Sony Music Philippines. Written and composed by Justin and produced by Radkidz, (Note: Radkidz (stylized in all caps) is composed of SB19's Pablo and his brother Joshua Daniel Nase, who is also known as Josue.) the folk-pop and ballad track describes a world filled with unlikely scenarios that serve as an escape from reality, encouraging the listener to continue dreaming. The music video was conceptualized and directed by Justin and Xi-Anne Avanceña.

== Background and release ==
Justin has surprised-announced his solo debut with "Surreal" on February 22, 2024, following his recent cover of Maroon 5's "Sunday Morning". The announcement was made through a cinematic trailer, featuring De Dios in a lush forest and a mysterious mask, symbolizing the heart's purpose when one sees light with closed eyes. The following week, the track was released on February 29, 2024.

== Composition and lyrics ==
Written by Justin and produced by Radkidz, "Surreal" is a folk-pop and ballad track describes a world filled with unlikely scenarios that serve as an escape from reality, encouraging the listener to continue dreaming. The track, which was initially written two years ago, is a lighthearted and wholesome piece that highlights the beauty of meaningful coincidences, dreams, and the ability to make the impossible possible. Justin's lyrics express a young man's vulnerability, while the visuals transport the viewer on a calming and chill journey through various environments.

Radkidz's music, composed of Pablo and Josue from SB19, produced "Surreal", bringing Justin's vision to life with subtlety and warmth. Justin spent one day recording vocals, and the demo was sent back in just a week. In the latter half of "Surreal", Gelou of P-pop group YARA, joins Justin's track, creating a soothing duet. It also features her vocals on the bridge and the final chorus part.

== Music video ==
Justin premiered the music video for his track, which was shot in the Philippines and South Korea for snow and winter scenes during an exclusive press conference on February 27. The music video was conceptualized and directed by Justin and Xi-Anne Avanceña. Set in a mystical forest, features a picturesque mountain view, snowfall, and moving clouds, capturing a surreal feeling when heard or seen. Justin's fascination with nature serves as the inspiration for the visuals. "Ever since I was young, growing up, (I’ve always found) something special with nature, forest, trees, and (stuff like that)".

== Accolades ==
Awards and nominations received by Bini
Award	Year	Category	Result	Ref.
Myx Music Awards	2024	Mellow Video of the Year	Won	
P-pop Music Awards	2024	Music Video of the Year	Nominated	
