= Muscle Food =

British online food retailer

MuscleFood
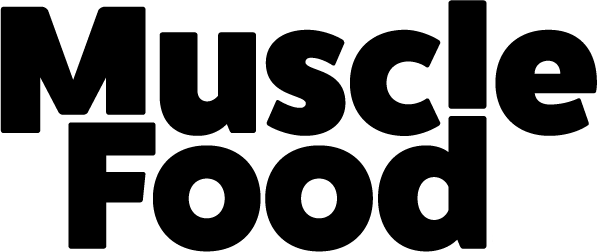
- Type: Private
- Industry: Nutritional supplements
- Founded: 2013
- Founder: Darren Beale
- Headquarters: Nottingham, UK
- Website: musclefood.com

MuscleFood is a British online food retailer based in Nottingham, UK that sells high-protein food and snacks, lean meats and sports supplements.

== History ==
MuscleFood was founded in 2013 by Darren Beale. They initially targeted only the bodybuilding community, but it soon expanded to reach the customers in the UK and Europe which included celebrities and sports people. In 2015, MuscleFood launched the first protein pizza in the country. They signed the contracts with the three supermarket chains Sainsbury’s, Co-op and Spar to sell their products and also start selling their products online.

In January 2018, MuscleFood received £10 million funding from BGF to expand the business internationally. In the same year, MuscleFood's entered into health and exerciser market with the launch of Do The Unthinkable programme.

Later in the year, the company won Specialist Online Retailer of the Year award at the Grocer Gold Awards.

== Controversy ==
MuscleFood recalls more than 60 meat products after inspection by the Food Standards Agency. They found that supplier, DB Foods, was found to be using food which had the wrong use-by dates on the labels. As a result, MuscleFood urged clients not to eat a range of its products between January 25, 2018 - February 3, 2018 and recalled their products.
