= Emoji (song) =

Single by SB19 and Jolin Tsai

from the album Wakas at Simula
- Language: English; Tagalog
- Released: March 27, 2026
- Genre: Pop
- Length: 4:01
- Label: Sony Philippines; 1Z
- Songwriters: Felip Jhon Suson; John Paulo Nase; Jolin Tsai; Joshua Daniel Nase; Chendy
- Producers: Felip Jhon Suson; Luke April

SB19 singles chronology
"Visa" (2026)	"Emoji" (2026)	"Lawless" (2026)

Jolin Tsai singles chronology
"Prague Square (Jolin Version)" (2026)	"Emoji" (2026)

Music video
- "︁Emoji" on YouTube

"Emoji" is a song by Filipino boy group SB19 and Taiwanese singer Jolin Tsai. It was written by Felip Jhon Suson, John Paulo Nase, Jolin Tsai, Joshua Daniel Nase, and Chendy, with production handled by Felip Jhon Suson and Luke April. The song was released on March 27, 2026, through Sony Music Philippines as the second single from SB19's second studio album, Wakas at Simula (2026).

== Background ==
The collaboration between SB19 and Tsai began after both acts performed at the Hito Music Awards in Taipei on June 21, 2025. SB19 performed at the event, with Tsai as the closing act. The two acts formed a connection during this time.

On March 23, 2026, SB19 announced the release of six new tracks for their upcoming album Wakas at Simula (2026) at a media launch in Quezon City. "Emoji" was revealed as one of the album's key tracks and features Tsai. SB19 expressed that this collaboration represents a step forward in their career as they aim for a broader international audience. Ken of SB19 noted, "From the very beginning, we've aimed for the global stage, and now is the right time to step out of our comfort zone."

== Composition and lyrics ==
"Emoji" blends elements of funk carioca with dynamic rhythms. The song's lyrics, co-written by SB19 members Pablo, Ken, and Tsai, discuss the use of emojis on social media as a way to hide real emotions. It touches on the difference between how people present themselves online and how they truly feel.

SB19 shared that their new album explores more personal themes, with a focus on self-expression and growth. "This album represents a new beginning for us," the group said. "We want to express ourselves more openly and explore deeper themes." Tsai expressed her gratitude for the collaboration, saying, "It was a great experience working with SB19 on this song. The style and choreography of 'Emoji' are different from anything I've done before."

== Music video ==
On March 27, 2026, the same day as the album's release, SB19 shared a teaser for the "Emoji" music video, featuring Tsai, ahead of its full premiere at 19:00 (UTC+08:00). The video was produced by 1032 Lab and directed by Alanshiii and John Vladimir Manalo.

The music video is set in a futuristic, metaverse-inspired environment characterized by neon lighting, glitch effects, and digital interfaces. It presents a dual visual concept that contrasts a polished, glamorous setting with a fragmented, chaotic one, representing the contrast between curated online identities and underlying emotional states. SB19 appear in coordinated black ensembles, while Tsai is introduced in a contrasting dark-themed style, joining the group in synchronized choreography sequences.

== Critical reception ==
According to Billboard's Jeff Benjamin, "Emoji" from the album Wakas at Simula (2026) is the record's most conceptually unexpected track, featuring a collaboration with Tsai that blends distinct musical styles. Benjamin noted that, although the song does not constitute a definitive artistic statement for either performer, it serves as a notable cultural bridge between two prominent figures in Asian pop music.

== Accolades ==
On September 16, 2026, "Emoji" received a nomination for International Collaboration of the Year at the BreakTudo Awards 2026.

== Credits and personnel ==
Credits are adapted from the description of the music video for "Emoji" on YouTube.

Music

- SB19 – vocals
- Jolin Tsai – vocals, songwriting
- Felip Jhon Suson – songwriting, production
- John Paulo Nase – songwriting
- Joshua Daniel Nase – songwriting
- Chendy – songwriting
- Luke April – production, mixing
- Emil Dela Rosa – mastering
- Yeh Yu-Hsuan – Tsai's vocal recording engineering
- BB Road Studio – Tsai's vocal recording studio

Video

- 1Z Entertainment – production
- SB19 – concept
- 1032 Lab – concept, production house
- Alanshiii – direction, creative direction
- John Vladimir Manalo – direction, cinematography
- Iana Cris Forbes – executive production, creative direction
- Iris Manzano – line production, production management
- Iolo Braganza – assistant direction
- Rie Hata – choreography (SB19 and Tsai)
- Jay Joseph Roncesvalles – choreography (W3)
- W3 – dance performance

== Charts ==
=== Weekly charts ===
Chart (2026)	Peak position
New Zealand Hot Singles (RMNZ)	38
Philippines Hot 100 (Billboard Philippines)	62
Philippines Top Songs (Billboard Philippines)	24

== Release history ==
Region	Date	Format(s)	Label	Ref.
Various	March 27, 2026	Digital download; streaming	Sony Philippines; 1Z	
