= Nyebe =

2022 single by SB19

Single by SB19
- Language: Filipino
- Released: December 12, 2022
- Recorded: 2022
- Length: 5:47
- Label: Sony
- Songwriter: John Paulo Nase
- Producers: John Paulo Nase; Thyro Alfaro

SB19 singles chronology
"WYAT (Where You At)" (2022)	"Nyebe" (2022)	"Gento" (2023)

Music video
- "Nyebe" on YouTube

"Nyebe" (lit. transl. Snow) is a song by Filipino boy band SB19, released as a single on December 12, 2022. A ballad, "Nyebe" is written by John Paulo Nase who also produced it with Thyro Alfaro.

Pablo is the music video creative director for "Nyebe". It premiered on YouTube on December 12, 2022. The music video visualizer is an emotional series of images and photo-highlight of SB19's journey during its 2022 Where You At World Tour where they discuss substantial questions about happiness, worries and living in the moment. It was inspired by the calming and relatability vibe of inspirational gospel songs. Nyebe was featured on the soundtrack of the movie Green Bones in 2024.

== Background and composition ==
John Paulo Nase wrote "Nyebe" and co-produced it with singer-songwriter and producer, Thyro Alfaro. Thyro Alfaro mixed the song with Heo Chan-goo by Knob Sound Korea and also did the mastering. "Nyebe" is five minutes and forty-seven seconds long. Media outlets described "Nyebe" as a heartfelt-ballad-produced, with contemporary inspirational-gospel-infused, and soulful ballad song similar to "Mapa", "Tilaluha" and "Hanggang Sa Huli". "Nyebe" also features the SB19's more reflective and emotional side, inspirational-soulful vibe of the group.

"Nyebe" contemplate the inspirational and touching side of the group. As Pablo stated in the interview with Philstar Global:

“I was thinking about the feeling of hopelessness, knowing and accepting that things are changing too fast. Time doesn’t stop, things around us happen so fast. At the end of the day, matutunaw rin ang nyebe. We just have to live with it and pray, there is always a ray of hope.”

— Pablo, Philstar Global

== Release and promotion ==
Before the official release of the new single, "Nyebe" was already part of the Where You At Global Tour set list. It was sung by SB19 on its live performances for the entire leg.

On December 9, days after the announcement of "Manila WYAT Homecoming Concert", SB19 has dropped a hint by changing the logo and banner of its official social media accounts. On the following day, December 10, they started posting series of video teaser on their social media about the new song with inspirational messages and questions. Two days later, the song "Nyebe" was released to the public. Also on December 12, the group released the music video for their new single "Nyebe".

== Accolades ==
Awards and nominations for "Nyebe"
Award	Year	Category	Result	Ref.
Awit Awards	2023	Song of the Year	Nominated	
Awit Awards	2023	Best Performance by a Group Recording Artist	Nominated	
Awit Awards	2023	Best Ballad Recording	Nominated	
Awit Awards	2023	Best Vocal Arrangement	Nominated	

== Music video ==
The music video visualizer has the creative direction of the band's leader Pablo, which was released on the same release date as the official audio on December 12, 2022. The visualizer documents behind-the-scenes moments from SB19's travels through their recent Where You At World Tour that visited New York, Los Angeles, San Francisco, Dubai and Singapore. Filmed in black-and-white, viewers see moments of the boys hanging around a fire pit and their visit to the Sony Music headquarters in NY, but also less upbeat visuals like what appears to be an unhoused person's cardboard shelter or trash on the sidewalk. It is also a collaborative effort from the people behind the global tour. "Nyebe" is an inspirational-heartfelt relatable song that gave hope, reminding everyone that there is always light behind the darkest cloud.

== Credits and personnel ==
Credits are adapted from Tidal and the song's music video.

- SB19 – main vocals
- John Paulo Nase – writer, producer
- Thyro Alfaro – producer and mixing
- Heo Chan-goo @Knob Sound Korea – audio mixing and mastering
- John Paulo Nase - creative director
