= Bazinga (song) =

2021 single by SB19

- Promotional artwork

Single by SB19

from the EP Pagsibol
- Language: English; Filipino
- Released: October 2021 (Note: Several news outlets described the song's release as a single following the release of its music video, however, there's no exact release date mentioned. In November 2021, Billboard also described the song as a single after it entered the Hot Trending Songs chart.)
- Genre: Trap-pop; reggaeton; hip-hop
- Length: 3:22; 3:15 (Re-recorded version)
- Label: Sony Philippines
- Songwriter: John Paulo Nase (Note: Better known as Pablo, the band's leader.)
- Producers: John Paulo Nase; Simon Servida

SB19 singles chronology
"Mapa" (2021)	"Bazinga" (2021)	"Ligaya" (2021)

Music video
- "Bazinga" on YouTube

"Bazinga" (also written as "Bazinga!") is a song by Filipino boy band SB19, which was first released on their first extended play (EP), Pagsibol (2021). John Paulo Nase wrote the song and produced it with Simon Servida. Sony Music Philippines released "Bazinga" as a single in October 2021. It is a trap-pop-produced, reggaeton-infused, hip-hop song with lyrics about self-empowerment, and served as a response to the increasing hate the boy band received on the internet. It was described as a "wake-up call" for the band to focus more on meaningful expressions of music.

The song spent 26 weeks on the Billboard Hot Trending Songs chart, including seven weeks at number one. The song's chart performance made it one of the longest-running number-one hits on the chart, and made SB19 the first Filipino act to do so. On Spotify, one month after the release of the song's accompanying music video, "Bazinga" was streamed 4.6 million times.

Jonathan Tal Placido directed the music video for "Bazinga", which premiered on YouTube on October 29, 2021. The music video depicts SB19 defeating their enemies in an arcade combat video game; it also served as a response to the criticisms the group experienced since the beginning of their music career. SB19 performed "Bazinga" on multiple occasions. On television, they performed the song on ASAP Natin 'To in 2021 and it features for the series, Senior High in 2023. The boy band also performed the song at the 34th Awit Awards, on the Wish 107.5 Bus, and at the 58th Binibining Pilipinas pageant. "Bazinga" was also included on the set lists of their concerts Back in the Zone (2021), Our Zone (2021), and Dunkin' Presents SB19 (2022). "Bazinga" has received multiple accolades from Awit Awards and Wish 107.5 Music Awards in 2022 and 2023, respectively.

== Background and release ==
In 2020, SB19 released their debut studio album Get in the Zone, which includes singles "Go Up" (2019) and "Alab (Burning)" (2019); the album mostly consists of upbeat, dance-pop production. In early 2021, the band teased their music comeback and released the lead single of their upcoming extended play (EP) "What?" (2021). SB19's first EP Pagsibol was released on July 22, 2021; the EP includes several music genres in contrast to the band's previous album release, which mainly consists of hip-hop influences. Songs "Mapa" (2021) and "Bazinga" are included on the EP.

During their career, SB19 received multiple criticisms, including criticisms of their physical appearance and style of clothing. The band were also accused of copying Korean music culture and for not promoting pure Filipino talents. In an interview with Toni Gonzaga, band member Josh stated; "It's not a big deal anymore, so far, and especially these days, because we receive more love than hate".

Following the premiere of its music video on October 29, 2021, several news outlets announced "Bazinga" had been released through Sony Music Philippines as the third single from Pagsibol. In November 2021, Billboard also noted the release of "Bazinga" as a single after it entered the Hot Trending Songs chart.

== Writing and composition ==
"Bazinga"
A 27-second sample of "Bazinga". Featuring hard-hitting beats, loud horns, high tension and energy, "Bazinga" is an EDM, trap-pop, reggaeton-infused hip-hop song.

John Paulo Nase wrote "Bazinga" and co-produced it with Canadian-Filipino music producer Simon Servida. Hyun Jeong Ko mixed the song while Nam Woo Kwon did the mastering. "Bazinga" is three minutes and 22 seconds long.

Media outlets described "Bazinga" as a trap-pop-produced, reggaeton-infused hip-hop song. The song also features hard-hitting beats, loud horns, high tension, and high energy. Hannah Lorenzo of Indiana Daily Student described the song as a "motivational speech" with lyrics combined with a hard-hitting beat and rap.

As a response to the criticisms that SB19 received, "Bazinga" includes lyrics that talk about self-empowerment. The song served as a response to the increasing hate that the boy band received on the internet during their music career. Additionally described as a "wake-up call", the boy band went to focus on the meaningful expressions of art and music.

== Commercial performance ==
A music video for "Bazinga" was released on October 29, 2021, and the song debuted at number nine on the Billboard Hot Trending Songs chart on November 13, 2021. The song peaked at number one on December 11, 2021, making SB19 the first Filipino act to top the Billboard Hot Trending Songs chart. The notable chart performance of "Bazinga" was attributed to the boy band's performance of the song at the 34th Awit Awards, which garnered a total of 1.5 million Twitter mentions. "Bazinga" spent 26 weeks on the chart, including seven weeks at number one, at one point beating BTS' record for the most weeks spent at number one with their single "Butter" (2021). One month after the release of the song's music video, "Bazinga" had been streamed on Spotify over 4.6 million times.

== Music video ==
Jonathan Tal Placido directed the accompanying music video for "Bazinga", which premiered on YouTube on October 29, 2021. SB19 promoted their third-anniversary concert Our Zone (2021), via their social media accounts, where they also teased the song's accompanying music video days prior to its release.

A still from the music video, where SB19 is seen cheering for each other after winning a game called Bazinga.

The design and theme of the music video mainly consist of graffiti. The music video was inspired by video games, and starts with SB19 waiting while preparing for a video game called Bazinga. Alter egos of the band members can be seen in the video game, in which they imitate a fight with their enemies in an underground arena. Mostly, the band members are dancing; in one scene, they wear black-and-red martial arts uniforms while performing on a stage. After they approach a bright, orange hallway, SB19 cheer for each other while an in-game voice declares they have won. As of January 2022, the music video had been viewed over four million times.

Nylon Manila reported the music video includes three Easter eggs related to SB19's career; the release dates of the band's debut single "Tilaluha" (2018) and the dance-practice video for their second single "Go Up" (2019)—which went viral on Twitter—and a tribute to their fans.

== Accolades ==
Awards and nominations for "Bazinga"
Award	Year	Category	Result	Ref.
Awit Awards	2022	Best Pop Recording	Won	
Awit Awards	2022	Best Dance Recording	Won	
Nylon Manila Big Bold Brave Awards	2022	Gen-Z Approved	Won	
PMPC Star Awards for Music	2024	Dance Recording of the Year	Won	
PMPC Star Awards for Music	2024	Music Video of the Year	Won	
Wish 107.5 Music Awards	2023	Wishclusive Pop Performance of the Year	Won	

== Live performances ==
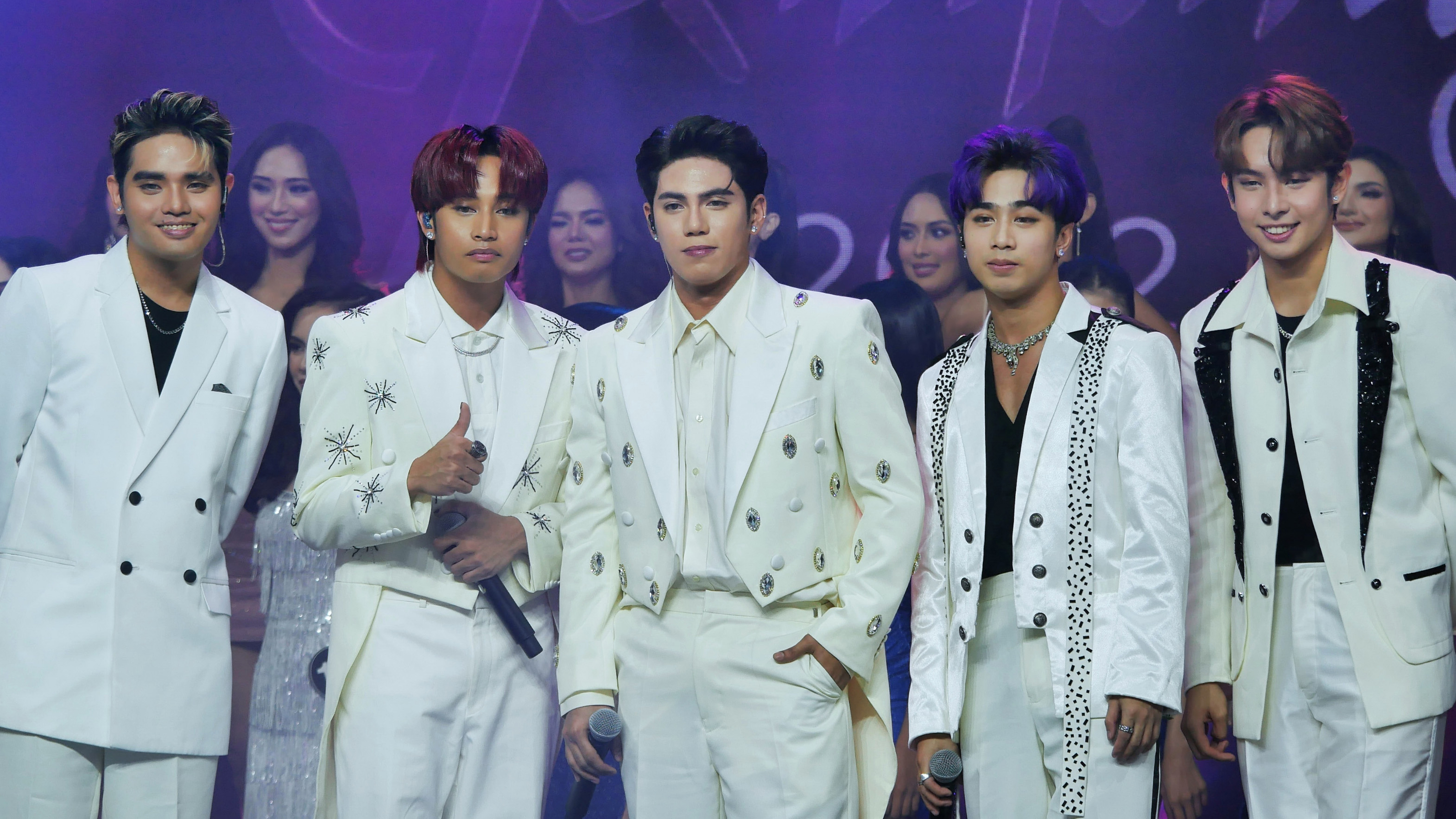
SB19 at the 58th Binibining Pilipinas pageant, where they once performed "Bazinga".

SB19 premiered "Bazinga" on the Philippine musical variety show ASAP Natin 'To on August 8, 2021. The band performed the song at the 34th Awit Awards on November 29, 2021, after being nominated for four awards, including the Peoples’ Voice Favorite Song award for their song “Hanggang sa Huli” (2020).

In March 2022, SB19 performed the song on the Wish 107.5 Bus, which gained it attraction among audiences. Weeks later, SB19 collaborated with Niana Guerrero to perform "Bazinga", along with "What?" (2021) and "Go Up" (2019), at a crosswalk in Bonifacio Global City, Taguig, as part of their "crosswalk concert". The boy band also performed the song at the grand coronation night of the 58th Binibining Pilipinas pageant.

Since its release, the band have included the song on the set lists of three of their concerts. In 2021, SB19 included the song on the set lists of their livestream concerts Back in the Zone and their third-anniversary concert Our Zone. In 2022, the band also included the song on the set list of their first arena concert Dunkin' Presents SB19, which was held at Smart Araneta Coliseum.

== Credits and personnel ==
Credits are adapted from Tidal and the song's music video.

- SB19 – main vocals
- John Paulo Nase – writer, producer
- Simon Servida – producer
- Hyun Jeong Ko – mixing
- Nam Woo Kwon – mastering
