= Pagsibol =

EP by SB19
- Released: July 22, 2021
- Recorded: 2021
- Studio: RealBros Sound Studio (Korea); Curb Studio (Korea)
- Genre: pop; reggaeton; trap-pop; rock; hip-hop; ballad
- Length: 24:11; 23:29 (Wakas at Simula re-recorded version)
- Language: Filipino; English
- Label: Sony Music Philippines
- Producer: Pablo; Simon Servida; Jay Durias; Thyro Alfaro; Joshua Daniel Nase

SB19 chronology
Get in the Zone (2020)	Pagsibol (2021)	Pagtatag! (2023)

Singles from Pagsibol
- 1. "What?" Released: March 9, 2021; 2. "Mapa" Released: May 16, 2021; 3. "Bazinga" Released: October 29, 2021; 4. "SLMT" Released: December 30, 2021

Pagsibol (lit. 'Sprouting') is the first extended play of Filipino boy band SB19, released on July 22, 2021, by Sony Music Philippines. It consists of six tracks, of which four were also released as singles, "What?", "Mapa", "Bazinga" and "SLMT".

== Background and development ==
In an interview, SB19 leader Pablo explained that they've named their first extended play (EP) Pagsibol because it represents their musical journey, citing their families as one of their greatest influences throughout their career. He wrote the song, and dedicated it to his own parents when he was homesick during their Get In The Zone tour in 2020. “What?,” the first song in the tracklist, tells about self-empowerment. According to the group, Pagsibol is tribute to their fans.

== Release and promotion ==
SB19 begun teasing a comeback in March, with a caption, "What is Coming?". On June 30, the group posted a poster featuring the record's title and their logo. A week after, the release date has been revealed accompanied with a pre-save link. They also announced a postponement of their upcoming concert. A release scheduler was posted on July 14, 2021.The tracklist was shown a day after that featured the two released singles "What? and "Mapa", promotional single "Ikako", and three more songs. Concept photos were dropped for 6 days and the highlight medley was released a day before the release. Hours before the release, SB19 guested in a livestream on Twitch by the American magazine Rolling Stone, as well as on iHeartRadio to promote their extended play. It was released on streaming and digital platforms on July 22, 2021. A lyric video for "Bazinga" was uploaded on YouTube on the same day.

The group has partnered with Spotify Philippines with a campaign that "showcases Pinoy pride and tells the story of SB19’s latest EP through audio and visual art". They collaborated with six Filipino visual artists to design jeepneys inspired by the six tracks on Pagsibol.

In January 2022, SB19 launched premium merchandise line inspired by Pagsibol. The exclusive merchandise was conceptualized and produced by Sony Music Philippines, SB19, and ShowBT. SB19's Justin De Dios serves as a co-creative director for the project, pitching in his input for all the studies and acting as liaison for the rest of the members when it comes to creative decisions.

== Accolades ==
Awards and nominations for "Pagsibol"
Award	Year	Category	Result	Ref.
Awit Awards	2022	Album of the Year	Nominated	
PMPC Star Awards for Music	2024	Album of the Year	Won	
PMPC Star Awards for Music	2024	Pop Album of the Year	Won	

== Track listing ==
Pagsibol track listing
No.	Title	Writer(s)	Producer(s)	Length
1.	"What?"	John Paulo Nase	John Paulo Nase; Joshua Daniel Nase; Simon Servida; Jay Durias	4:30
2.	"Mapa"	Nase	John Paulo Nase; Simon Servida; Jay Durias	4:35
3.	"Mana"	Nase	John Paulo Nase; Simon Servida	4:04
4.	"Bazinga"	Nase	John Paulo Nase; Simon Servida	3:23
5.	"Ikako"	Nase	John Paulo Nase; Thyro Alfaro	4:20
6.	"SLMT"	Nase	John Paulo Nase; Simon Servida	3:19
Total length:				24:11

== Release history ==
Release history and formats for Pagsibol
Region	Date	Format	Label	Ref.
Various	July 22, 2021	Digital download; streaming	Sony Music	
Philippines	December 21, 2021	CD	Sony Music Philippines	
