= What? (SB19 song) =

2021 single by SB19

Single by SB19

from the EP Pagsibol
- Language: Tagalog; English
- Released: March 9, 2021
- Recorded: 2021
- Genre: P-pop; EDM; hip-hop
- Length: 4:30; 5:16 (Re-recorded version)
- Label: Sony
- Songwriter: John Paulo Nase
- Producers: John Paulo Nase; Simon Servida; Joshua Daniel Nase; Jay Durias

SB19 singles chronology
"Hanggang Sa Huli" (2020)	"What?" (2021)	"Mapa" (2021)

Music video
- "What?" on YouTube

"What?" is a song recorded by Filipino boy band SB19 as the first single off their extended play Pagsibol. The song was written by the band leader Pablo, who also produced the song, together with his brother Joshua Daniel Nase, Simon Servida, and South Border's Jay Oliver Durias. It was released on March 9, 2021, by Sony Music alongside the premiere of its official music video which was directed by the band member Justin.

== Background and composition ==
The song was written, composed, and produced by the leader of SB19, Pablo (credited as John Paulo Nase). His brother, Joshua Daniel Nase, along with South Border member Jay Durias and Filipino-Canadian producer Simon Servida also co-produced the track. It is a blend of dance and electro-pop with elements of rap, rock, hip-hop, and EDM. The song was composed in the key of A major on the original mix while in G♭ minor on the extended version with a tempo of 96 beats per minute. Servida mentioned in a vlog showing the song's production, that "What?" was quite a challenge due to the tempo changes and complexity which Pablo had asked for, wanting a heavier and more explosive beat. It is a take-off from SB19's debut album which is dominated by dance-pop and ballad styles, and is "really different" from what they have done before. Pablo stated that the song has a more "aggressive take to it" than their previous songs and added that it is an anthem about self-love and empowerment. However, others noticed that the song contains lyrics with a few political references.

A lot of people still doubt us, denouncing everything that we do and everything that we're trying to achieve. We love what we do, that's why we do it respectfully. 'What?' is about self-love and empowerment. Each of us has our own flag. We should be proud of it and raise it as much as we can. As SB19 and as individuals, we know that we're not the best at everything, but that shouldn't stop us from what we want to achieve.

— Pablo, Philippine Daily Inquirer

== Release and promotion ==
"What?" was revealed to the public as SB19's newest single on February 25, 2021, via YouTube and their other social media accounts. SB19 revealed several photos and teaser clips showing a few scenes of the music video, photos, and choreography before its official release on March 9. However, on March 8, 2021, ShowBT Philippines, the talent agency that manages SB19, announced the temporary postponement of the virtual music launch that was scheduled for the day following the release due to the members being exposed to an individual who tested positive for COVID-19; the boy band was placed into quarantine. The company apologized in their official statement posted on SB19's official social media and said the music launch will have a new event date announced soon. Despite the postponement, the digital single along with its official merchandise and music video had still pushed through as scheduled.

On April 24, 2021, the limited edition premium fashion merchandise in collaboration with designer Chynna Mamawal was released. The collection featured streetwear pieces limited only to 100 pieces, coming in two sets, as well as shirts and dresses inspired by the single. A month later, a five-episode documentary entitled What?: The Making Film was uploaded on their YouTube channel weekly, featuring behind-the-scenes footage of the preparation for "What?".

== Critical reception ==
Apple Music reviewed "What?" as a "patriotic OPM pop that hits hard enough to start a street party." Max San Diego from uDou described the song as the same to the composition of Girl's Generation's "I Got A Boy", both with multiple beat changes and genres; added that "What?" is "messily laid out but you can still agree that it works" and a "hallmark song" for all music in P-pop. Rank The Mag called it a "contagiously massive sound that's larger and louder than life", while LionHearTV defined the song with its "breezy upbeat vibe" dominated with "catchphrase-driven identity". Bulatlat said "What?" is an incorporation of different styles, tempos, and meanings "wrapped in metaphors and imagery that could initially confuse a listener but all working beautifully in the end".

== Accolades ==
Awards and nominations for "What?"
Award	Year	Category	Result	Ref.
Awit Awards	2022	Best Global Recording	Won	
Awit Awards	2022	Best Music Video	Nominated	
Nylon Manila Big Bold Brave Awards	2021	Gen-Z Approved Hit	Won	
Wish 107.5 Music Awards	2022	Wish Pop Song of the Year	Won	

== Music video ==
The music video was directed by the band's sub-vocalist Justin, and released alongside the official audio on March 9, 2021. Justin was involved mostly in the band's music production as manifested in their previous music video "Hanggang sa Huli". In the video, the members "showcased their singing and dancing skills while rocking various outfits" designed for the concept. The music video earned 1.4 million views within a day of its premiere. Media outlets described the setting in the video as "fictional" and a "post-apocalyptic world" with "chaos and energy" running through it. Some shared that the video's editing and visual effects needed further refinement, yet it still "set the bar way too high" for the quality of Filipino pop music videos.

At the end of the video, the Murillo-Vellarde map was featured, which is a historical document that was previously used to strengthen the Philippines' claim over the West Philippine Sea. The appearance of the map sparked discussion on Reddit, where a user pointed out that "no evidence or proof can be used if the national government itself does not support it". Other users also commended the group's efforts in raising awareness about the importance of the map.

== Live performances ==
SB19 performed "What?" on their virtual fan meet sponsored by TikTok Philippines on April 17, 2021, with vocals only due to venue restrictions. Two weeks later, they performed the song on national television for the first time at the morning show Unang Hirit. On May 9, they headlined the Mother's day special episode of the Sunday noontime show All-Out Sundays performing "What?" live. On May 15, SB19 performed the song on the variety show ASAP. The song was performed on the live broadcast of "Mapa" music showcase three days later. It was also performed at the Lazada 6.6 Super Show on June 5, 2021.

== Track listing ==
- Digital
1. "What?" – 4:30
2. "What?" (Extended Version) – 5:19

== Credits and personnel ==
Credits adapted from Tidal and music video.

- John Paulo Nase – primary vocals, composer, producer
- Justin De Dios – primary vocals
- Felip Jhon Suson – primary vocals
- Stellvester Ajero – primary vocals, choreography
- Josh Cullen Santos – primary vocals
- Joshua Daniel Nase – producer
- Jay Durias – producer
- Simon Servida – producer
- Leon Zervos – mastering engineer
- Janno Queyquep – guitar
- Hyun Jeong Ko – mixing engineer
- Louis Anthony Duran – cover art design
- Tank Bautista – choreography
