= Mapa (song) =

2021 single by SB19

Single by SB19

from the EP Pagsibol
- Language: Filipino
- Released: May 16, 2021
- Recorded: 2021
- Genre: Pop; adult contemporary
- Length: 4:35; 4:10 (Re-recorded version)
- Label: Sony Philippines
- Songwriter: John Paulo Nase
- Producers: John Paulo Nase; Jay Durias; Simon Servida

SB19 singles chronology
"What?" (2021)	"Mapa" (2021)	"Bazinga" (2021)

Lyric video
- "Mapa" on YouTube

"Mapa" (Note: Stylized in uppercase. The title is a wordplay on map, its literal translation, and the portmanteau of mama and papa.) is a song recorded by Filipino boy band SB19, released on May 16, 2021, by Sony Music, as the second pre-release digital single off their extended play (EP) Pagsibol. "Mapa" was written by the band's leader Pablo. The song was also produced by Pablo, with Jay Durias and Simon Servida, who both served as co-producers on the band's previous single "What?".

The song was released between Mother's Day and Father's Day as a tribute to all parents. "Mapa" placed fifth on Google's most searched songs globally in 2021. On July 8, 2024, "Mapa"'s accompanying lyric video on YouTube surpassed 100 million views. This milestone coincided with SB19's live performance of "Mapa" on The First Take a week later, and the subsequent release of this performance's audio recording as a digital single, entitled "Mapa — from The First Take", on August 22, 2024.

== Recording ==
SB19 began creating "Mapa" before the COVID-19 pandemic and during their concert tour across the Philippines. SB19 had less time to be with their families which prompted the group to record a pop song for their parents. Pablo was quoted in a press conference as saying that "We released this song to show gratitude and appreciation for [our parents for] helping us survive all the challenges and difficulties that we've encountered growing up". The songwriting was initiated through a Q&A where each of the members was asked what they would like to say to their parents. The song's production was mostly done virtually with the co-producer, Simon Servida, and Pablo communicating only via Instagram.

== Composition and lyrics ==
"Mapa" has been described as a "rousing ballad" akin to a "Japanese ballad that can be very well used as a closing song for an anime series". GMA News called it a soulful ballad similar to "Tilaluha" and "Hanggang Sa Huli". The melody was inspired from a lullaby that Pablo's mother would sing to him when he was a child. In terms of music notation, the song is composed in the key of A major, where its last chorus is B-flat major with a tempo of 130 beats per minute, and has a length of 4:35.

Before the release, a brief snippet of the lyrics "La-ta-ra-ta-ra, la-ta-ra-ta-ra" sung by Pablo was revealed at the end of the logo trailer. Lyrically, the song title is a combination of the Tagalog words "mama" and "papa" and the lyrics are described as "heart-wrenching" and "incredibly moving". Pablo wrote the lyrics to "inspire people to be appreciative of everything that our parents did for us and to give back" and underscore the role of parents in providing guidance and direction in life. Daily Tribune described that the lyrics evoked the representation of son and parents "in tight embrace" which depicted to be a "love letter" to mothers and fathers.

He (referring to Pablo) wanted to make a song that conveys the feeling of being taken care of by one's parents. He proceeded to write lyrics that equate our parents to the 'map' that guides us to be the best versions of ourselves.

— Josh, Rank The Mag

== Release and promotion ==
Two months after the release of "What?," SB19 shared in an interview that the release of their next single would be in May. On May 3, 2021, the band posted about the new song on their social media with information on the release date. Four days later, the title of the song "Mapa" was revealed to the public. The scheduler for the track featured daily promotional activities that started with SB19 penning a letter to their parents on the first day, with fans taking their turn the following day. The logo for the song, which features a compass with a paper airplane, was revealed through a 19-minute video trailer posted on YouTube. Throughout the next five days, the band posted lyric cards accompanied by a Twitter "mention party" with each band member. "Mapa" was sent to digital streaming and download platforms on May 16, 2021, complemented with a lyric video. The song was performed for the first time during a music showcase broadcast on Facebook and YouTube.

=== Usage in media ===
On May 23, 2021, the song was performed on national television on ASAP. A making-of film was uploaded on YouTube a week after the release of the band version. In November the same year, it was used as a jingle for Purefoods' omnibus Christmas ad with altered lyrics and a different arrangement.

In 2022, the song was used as part of a weekly task by the teen housemates in Pinoy Big Brother: Kumunity Season 10, where SB19 performed alongside the teen housemates in their final performance.

In 2024, the song was used as part of the theme song for the film And the Breadwinner Is... starring Vice Ganda.

== Accolades ==
Awards and nominations for "Mapa"
Award	Year	Category	Result	Ref.
Awit Awards	2022	Best Performance by a Group Recording Artist	Won	
Awit Awards	2022	Song of the Year	Nominated	
Awit Awards	2022	Most Streamed Song	Won	
Awit Awards	2022	Best Vocal Arrangement	Won	
PMPC Star Awards for Music	2024	Song of the Year	Won	

== Band version ==
"Mapa (Band Version)"

Song by SB19 and Ben&Ben
- Language: Tagalog
- Released: June 27, 2021
- Recorded: 2021
- Genre: Alternative folk
- Length: 4:30
- Label: Sony Philippines
- Songwriter: John Paulo Nase
- Producers: SB19; Ben&Ben; Mark Villar; Jean-Paul Verona

Music video
- "Mapa (Band Version)" on YouTube

A full-band rendition of the song was released on June 27, 2021, through Sony Music. It was recorded by SB19 and Filipino folk-pop band Ben&Ben, and produced by SB19, Ben&Ben, Mark Villar, and Jean-Paul Verona. It marked the first collaboration between SB19 and Ben&Ben. The performance video was shot in the reopened art deco-inspired Manila Metropolitan Theatre after six years of restoration.

=== Recording and composition ===
According to their label, SB19 came up with the idea to do a band version of the song with Ben&Ben. Spurred by their mutual admiration, both groups immediately agreed to the idea of collaboration. Leading up to the song release, they unveiled teasers in the form of concept photos showing members of both groups on sets with old furniture and books.

Ben&Ben were given complete musical and creative freedom to arrange the song and only received additional comments to help some parts flow better. Pablo and Ben&Ben keyboardist Pat Lasaten were directly coordinating and constantly exchanging updates. The arrangement was mainly conceptualized by Lasaten and Ben&Ben electric guitarist Poch Barreto. Ben&Ben label manager Roslyn Pineda said that "Arrangement-wise, we wanted to make it distinct from the original, adding fun rhythms and grand sections. We felt that doing this added weight, and served to support the powerful vocal performance of both acts."

The new version of "Mapa" is characterized by a jazzy sound, orchestral details, "inviting harmonies," and expansive arrangements. Pablo described it as giving the song a "rich, well-rounded, and a happy feeling" compared to the original version which he described as "more mellow".

== Accolades ==
Awards and nominations for "Mapa (Band Version)"
Award	Year	Category	Result	Ref.
Awit Awards	2022	Record of the Year	Nominated	

== Credits and personnel ==
Credits adapted from Tidal, lyric video and official video.

- SB19 – performer, producer, primary vocals
- Ben&Ben – performer, arrangement, producer (Band version only)
- John Paulo Nase – composer, producer, songwriter
- Jay Durias – producer, piano
- Simon Servida – producer
- Hyun Jeong Jo – mastering and mixing
- Glendford Lumbao – cover art design
- Sean Fuentes - cover art design (SB19 version)
- Mark Villar – producer, mixing and mastering (Band version only)
- Poch Barretto – arrangement (Band version only)
- Patricia Lasaten – arrangement (Band version only)
- Jean-Paul Verona – producer (Band version only)
- Sam Marquez – assistant sound engineer (Band version only)
- Richard Garcia – live sound engineer (Band version only)

== Charts ==
=== Weekly charts ===
Weekly chart performance for "Mapa"
Chart (2021)	Peak position
Hong Kong (HKRIA)	29
