= Pablo (Filipino musician) =

Filipino singer-songwriter (born 1994)

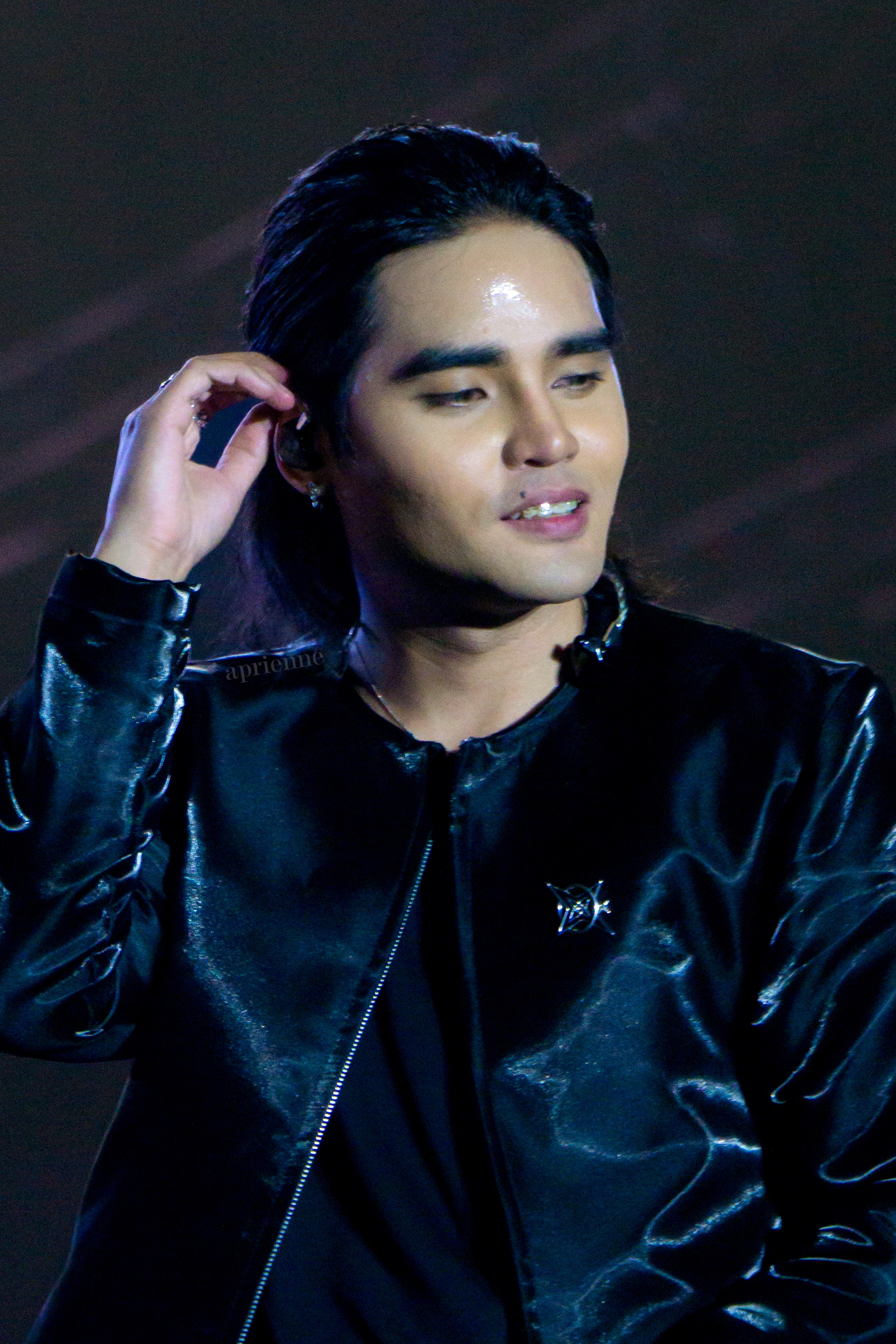
- Pablo in 2023
- Born: September 14, 1994 (age 32); Imus, Cavite, Philippines
- Other name: Sejun (formerly)
- Education: Polytechnic University of the Philippines
- Occupations: Singer; dancer; songwriter; composer; producer; creative director; music director; CEO
- Years active: 2018–present
- Relatives: Joshua Daniel Nase (brother)
- Musical career
- Genres: P-pop; hip hop; pop
- Instruments: Vocals
- Labels: 1Z; Sony Philippines; ShowBT (formerly)
- Member of: SB19

John Paulo Bagnas Nase (born September 14, 1994), known professionally as Pablo (formerly Sejun), is a Filipino singer, songwriter, rapper, dancer, and record producer. He is a member of the Filipino boy band SB19 and President of 1Z Entertainment, a company built and managed by SB19 members. He was honored as 2025 Artist of the Year by 10th Wish Music Awards.

== Early life ==
Pablo was born on September 14, 1994, in Imus, Cavite, Philippines. He is the second-born child along with two sisters and two brothers. In high school, he served as a point guard in their basketball varsity team. He entered college at the Polytechnic University of the Philippines, and while in his senior year, he worked as a call center representative. After graduating with a Bachelor of Arts in English degree, Pablo worked as a data analyst in Makati. He had a passion for performing in his early years but was afraid of sharing it with others except his inner circles.

== Career ==
=== Pre-debut: Auditions ===
In 2016, Pablo auditioned for ShowBT Philippines after meeting their Korean trainer at a Korean musical. He was subtle in his performances and underplayed his skills in performing, reluctant to show them to other people. However, Pablo continued to pursue performing as it was his passion. He was the first member of SB19 to audition at the talent agency. After passing the auditions, he started training for two years and became part of the NARRA trainee group. Due to the pressure of the training program, he resigned from his work as a data analyst to focus on training. The trainee group performed at various events of the agency.

=== 2018–2021: SB19 debut, songwriting and production ===
Of all of the members of SB19, Pablo trained the longest. Implementing the Korean idol training system, ShowBT Philippines conducted evaluations weekly by removing underperforming trainees. Pablo received a slot for the final line-up for SB19 as the band's leader and rapper. On 26 October 2018, Pablo debuted with fellow members Josh, Stell, Justin, and Ken with "Tilaluha" written by himself. As a leader, Pablo helps his co-members even in their solo career and focused on the idea of "choosing to be kind" reminding their fans to be humble always.

Pablo served as the main songwriter of the band's songs participating on all of the singles such as "Go Up" (2019) and "Alab (Burning)" (2020). Pablo was also credited as the lyricist of the boy band's debut Get in the Zone (2020) released on 31 July 2020. SB19's debut extended play Pagsibol (EP) released on 22 July 2021 was co-produced and written by Pablo.

=== 2022: Solo debut ===
On 28 January 2022, Pablo released his first solo track "La Luna" (2022) under Sony Music Philippines. The song focused about his feelings and beliefs and acceptance of shortcomings free from society's unrealistic and unhealthy expectations.

Pablo started his career in producing outside SB19 with hip-hop group PLAN B's R&B song "Love" released on 13 April 2022.

In 2024, Pablo became a coach in GMA Network's adaptation of The Voice Kids, joining his fellow SB19 member Stell, who was also the coach since The Voice Generations.

On September 13, 2024, Pablo released his first solo album ALON , which featured prior solo single La Luna, as a part of a two-album project. The second album, LAON, was released on September 20th, 2024.

== Artistry ==
=== Influences ===
Pablo's inspirations are Filipino hip hop artists Loonie and Gloc-9. He also admires the styles of Ez Mil, Eminem, NF, and BigBang's G-Dragon.

== Discography ==
=== As lead artist ===
List of singles showing year released and album name
Title	Year	Album
"La Luna"	2022	Non-album single
"Edsa"	2024	Non-album single
"Usad"	2026	Non-album single

=== Collaboration ===
List of singles showing year released and album name
Title	Year	Album
"Determinado" (with Josue)	2024	Non-album single
"Akala" (with Josue)	2024	Non-album single

=== Production credits ===
Year	Artist(s)	Song	Album	Songwriter		Producer	
Year	Artist(s)	Song	Album	Credited	With	Credited	With
2024	Stell	"Anino"	Room	Yes	Josue (Radkidz)	Yes	Josue (Radkidz)
2024	Stell	"Room"	Room	Yes	Josue (Radkidz)	Yes	Josue (Radkidz)
2024	Pablo	"Edsa"	Non-album singles	Yes	—N/a	Yes	—N/a
2023	SB19	"Gento"	Pagtatag	Yes	—N/a	Yes	Simon Servida; Josue (Radkidz)
2023	SB19	"I Want You"	Pagtatag	Yes	—N/a	Yes	August Rigo
2023	SB19	"Crimzone"	Pagtatag	Yes	Josue (Radkidz); Felip; Josh Cullen	Yes	Simon Servida
2023	SB19	"Ilaw"	Pagtatag	Yes	—N/a	Yes	Brian Lotho; Len Calvo; Josue (Radkidz)
2023	SB19	"Liham"	Pagtatag	Yes	—N/a	Yes	Brian Lotho; Len Calvo; Josue (Radkidz)
2023	SB19	"Freedom"	Pagtatag	Yes	Josue (Radkidz)	Yes	Oh-won Lee
2022	SB19	"Nyebe"	Non-album single	Yes	—N/a	Yes	Thyro Alfaro
2022	SB19	"WYAT (Where You At)"	Non-album single	Yes	—N/a	Yes	Joshua Daniel Nase
2022	SB19	"Make Your Green Mark"	Non-album single	Yes	—N/a	Yes	Joshua Daniel Nase
2022	SB19, Ohwon Lee	"Love Yours"	Real Recognize Real	Yes	Lee Oh-won	Yes	—N/a
2022	Pablo	"La Luna"	Non-album single	Yes	—N/a	Yes	Thyro Alfaro
2021	SB19	"Ligaya"	Non-album single	Yes	—N/a	Yes	Emil Dela Rosa
2021	SB19, Ben&Ben	"Kapangyarihan"	Pebble House, Vol. 1: Kuwaderno	Yes	Paulo Benjamin; Miguel Benjamin	Yes	—N/a
2021	Josue, Pablo	"Determinado"	Non-album single	Yes	Joshua Daniel Nase	Yes	Joshua Daniel Nase
2021	SB19	"What?"	Pagsibol	Yes	—N/a	Yes	John Paulo Nase; Joshua Daniel Nase; Simon Servida; Jay Durias
2021	SB19	"Mapa"	Pagsibol	Yes	—N/a	Yes	Simon Servida; Jay Durias
2021	SB19	"Bazinga"	Pagsibol	Yes	—N/a	Yes	Simon Servida
2021	SB19	"Mana"	Pagsibol	Yes	—N/a	Yes	Simon Servida
2021	SB19	"Ikako"	Pagsibol	Yes	—N/a	Yes	Thyro Alfaro
2021	SB19	"SLMT"	Pagsibol	Yes	—N/a	Yes	Simon Servida
2021	SB19	"The One"	Non-album single	Yes	—N/a	No	—N/a
2020	SB19	"Alab (Burning)"	Get in the Zone	Yes	Pablo; Han Tae-soo	No	—N/a
2020	SB19	"Go Up"	Get in the Zone	Yes	Pablo; Lee Oh-won; Glow	No	—N/a
2020	SB19	"Tilaluha"	Get in the Zone	Yes	Pablo; Kim Kyeong-su; Geong Seong-han	No	—N/a
2020	SB19	"Love Goes"	Get in the Zone	Yes	Pablo; Kim Kyeong-su; Geong Seong-han	No	—N/a
2020	SB19	"Hanggang sa Huli"	Get in the Zone	Yes	Pablo; Geong Seong-han	No	—N/a
2020	SB19	"Wag Mong Ikunot ang Iyong Noo"	Get in the Zone	Yes	Pablo; Choi Chang Eon	No	—N/a
2020	Josue, Pablo	"Akala"	Non-album single	Yes	Joshua Daniel Nase	Yes	Joshua Daniel Nase

== Videography ==
=== Music video ===
List of music videos showing year released, director, and length
Year	Title	Director(s)	Length	Ref.
2022	"La Luna"	Pablo	3:50	
2024	"Determinado"	John Manalo	3:17	
2024	"The Boy Who Cried Wolf"	Sonny Calvento	4:13	

== Awards and nominations ==
Name of the award ceremony, year presented, award category, nominee(s) of the award, and the result of the nomination
Award ceremony	Year	Category	Nominee(s)/work(s)	Result	Ref.
Djooky Music Awards (DMA) – Spring Edition	2021	Best Song	"Determinado"	Won	
Village Pipol Choice Award	2022	Composer of the Year	"Mapa"	Won	
Village Pipol Choice Award	2023	Composer of the Year	"WYAT"	Won	
Village Pipol Choice Award	2024	Composer of the Year	"Gento"	Won	
Awit Awards	2023	Best Performance by a Male Recording Artist	"La Luna"	Nominated	
Awit Awards	2023	People's Voice Favorite Male Artist	Pablo	Nominated	
PPOP Awards	2023	Top Male Leader of the Year	Pablo	Won	
10th Wish Music Awards	2025	Artist of the Year	Pablo	Won	
