= Myx Music Award for Song of the Year =

- Country: Philippines
- Presented by: Myx
- First award: 2006
- Currently held by: Bini - "Pantropiko" (2024)
- Website: myx.abs-cbn.com

The Myx Music Award for Song of the Year is one of the awards handed out at the yearly Myx Music Awards. It was first awarded in 2006 and presented to Cueshé for their song Stay. Gloc-9, Sarah Geronimo and SB19 are the only artists to win the award more than once.

Since the 2018, the name of the category has changed from Favorite Song to Song of the Year.

== Recipients ==
=== Favorite Song (2006–2017) ===
Year	Winner(s)	Work	Nominees
2006	Cueshé	"Stay"	Bamboo — "Hallelujah"; Hale — "The Day You Said Goodnight"; Orange and Lemons — "Pinoy Ako"; Sponge Cola — "Gemini"
2007	Sponge Cola	"Bitiw"	Kamikazee — "Narda"; Kamikazee — "Doo Bidoo"; Sandwich — "Sugod"; Callalily — "Stars"
2008	Sarah Geronimo	"Ikaw"	6cyclemind — "Magsasaya"; Chicosci — "Chicosci Vampire Social Club"; Silent Sanctuary — "Ikaw Lamang"; Sugarfree — "Wag Kang Nang Umiyak"
2009	Sandwich	"Betamax"	Bamboo — "Kailan"; Sponge Cola — "Pasubali"; Hale — "Pitong Araw"; Rico Blanco — "Yugto"
2010	Kyla and Jay-R	"Back In Time"	Rico Blanco — "Antukin"; Sponge Cola — "Di Na Mababawi"; Chicosci — "Diamond Shotgun"; Pedicab — "Simulan Mo Na"
2011	Yeng Constantino	"Jeepney Love Story"	Slapshock — "Cariño Brutal"; Tanya Markova — "Disney"; 6cyclemind (featuring Kean Cipriano & Yeng Constantino) — "Kung Wala Na Nga"; Parokya Ni Edgar — "Pakiusap Lang (Lasingin N'yo Ako)"
2012	Parokya Ni Edgar (featuring Happee Sy)	"Pangarap Lang Kita"	Pupil — "20/20"; Zia Quizon — "Ako Na Lang"; Somedaydream — "Hey Daydreamer"; Gloc-9 (featuring Sheng Belmonte) — "Walang Natira"
2013	Gloc-9 (featuring Ebe Dancel)	"Sirena"	Krissy and Ericka — "12:51"; Julie Anne San Jose — "I'll Be There"; Never The Strangers — "Moving Closer"; Quest — "Sige Lang"
2014	Gloc-9 (featuring Rico Blanco)	"Magda"	Jireh Lim — "Buko"; Yeng Constantino — "Chinito"; Sarah Geronimo — "Ikot-Ikot"; Daniel Padilla — "Nasa Iyo Na Ang Lahat"
2015	Daniel Padilla	"Simpleng Tulad Mo"	Kyla — "Dito Na Lang"; KZ Tandingan — "Mahal Ko O Mahal Ako"; James Reid and Nadine Lustre — "No Erase"; Toni Gonzaga — "This Love Is Like"
2016	Nadine Lustre	"Me & You"	Bamboo — "Firepower"; Darren Espanto — "Stuck"; Sam Concepcion — "Teka Break"; Julie Anne San Jose — "Tidal Wave"
2017	Sarah Geronimo	"Tala"	Darren Espanto — "7 Minutes"; Elmo Magalona — "Kay Dali"; Bailey May and Ylona Garcia — "O Pag-ibig"; James Reid — "Randomantic"

=== Song of the Year (2018–present) ===
Year	Winner(s)	Work	Nominees
2018	James Reid	"Cool Down"	Jona — "Ano Nga Ba Tayo?"; Sarah Geronimo feat. Yeng Constantino — "Kaibigan Mo"; Glaiza de Castro — "Sa ‘Yo Pa Rin"; Moira Dela Torre — "Titibo-Tibo"
2019	Juan Karlos	"Buwan"	Ben&Ben — "Kathang-Isip"; IV of Spades — "Mundo"; Shanti Dope — "Nadarang"; Moira Dela Torre — "Tagpuan"
2020	SB19	"Go Up"	IV of Spades — "Come Inside of My Heart"; KZ and Shanti Dope — "Imposible"; Daniel Padilla and Moira Dela Torre — "Mabagal"; Ben&Ben — "Pagtingin"
2021	SB19	"Alab"	Matthaios — "Catriona"; Ben&Ben — "Lifetime"; Juan and Kyle — "Marikit"; Moira Dela Torre — "Paubaya"
2024	Bini	"Pantropiko"	Maki — "Dilaw"; Juan Karlos — "Ere"; Lola Amour — "Raining in Manila"; Dionela feat. Jay R — "Sining"

== Artist with multiple awards ==
Two awards

- Gloc-9
- Sarah Geronimo
- SB19

== Artist with multiple nominations ==
Four nominations

- Moira Dela Torre
- Sponge Cola

Three nominations

- Bamboo
- Ben&Ben
- Gloc-9
- Rico Blanco
- Sarah Geronimo
- Yeng Constantino

Two nominations

- 6Cyclemind
- Chicosci
- Darren Espanto
- Ebe Dancel
- Hale
- IV of Spades
- James Reid
- Jay R
- Juan Karlos
- Julie Anne San Jose
- Kamikazee
- Kean Cipriano
- Nadine Lustre
- Sandwich
- SB19
