= Myx Music Award for Favorite International Video =

Music award

Myx Music Award for Favorite International Music Video
- Country: Philippines
- Presented by: Myx
- First award: 2006
- Final award: 2021

Highlights
- Most awards: Taylor Swift and BTS (3 each)
- Most nominations: Taylor Swift (9)

The Myx Music Award for Favorite International Music Video is one of the awards handed out at the yearly Myx Music Award. It was first awarded in 2006 and presented to The Pussycat Dolls for their song "Don't Cha". 2NE1, Wonder Girls, Super Junior, BTS, and Lisa are the only K-pop acts to be nominated in this category, with Super Junior being the first K-pop act to win the award in 2018. A separate category was made to honor K-pop artists. Taylor Swift and BTS are the most awarded artists in this category, with three awards each.

== Recipients ==
Year	Winner(s)	Work	Nominees
2006	The Pussycat Dolls	"Don't Cha"	"We Belong Together" by Mariah Carey; "My Humps" by The Black Eyed Peas; "Incomplete" by Backstreet Boys; "Wake Me Up When September Ends" by Green Day
2007	My Chemical Romance	"Welcome to the Black Parade"	"Buttons" by The Pussycat Dolls; "Bebot" by The Black Eyed Peas; "Breaking Free" by Nikki Gil, Vince Chong and Alicia Pan; "SexyBack" by Justin Timberlake
2008	My Chemical Romance	"Teenagers"	"Girlfriend" by Avril Lavigne; "Your Guardian Angel" by The Red Jumpsuit Apparatus; "Umbrella" by Rihanna; "Jenny" by The Click Five
2009	David Archuleta	"Crush"	"7 Things" by Miley Cyrus; "Decode" by Paramore; "When You Look Me In The Eyes" by Jonas Brothers; "Womanizer" by Britney Spears
2010	Taylor Swift	"Love Story"	"Fire" by 2NE1; "Nobody" by Wonder Girls; "One Time" by Justin Bieber; "The Climb" by Miley Cyrus
2011	Bruno Mars	"Just The Way You Are"	"Love the Way You Lie" by Eminem (featuring Rihanna); "Baby" by Justin Bieber (featuring Ludacris); "Pyramid" by Jake Zyrus (featuring Iyaz); "Telephone" by Lady Gaga (featuring Beyoncé)
2012	Katy Perry	"Firework"	"Born This Way" by Lady Gaga; "Moves like Jagger" by Maroon 5 (featuring Christina Aguilera); "The Lazy Song" by Bruno Mars; "What Makes You Beautiful" by One Direction
2013	One Direction	"One Thing"	"Boyfriend" by Justin Bieber; "Part of Me" by Katy Perry; "We Are Never Ever Getting Back Together" by Taylor Swift; "Payphone" by Maroon 5 (featuring Wiz Khalifa)
2014	Katy Perry	"Roar"	"Best Song Ever" by One Direction; "Royals" by Lorde; "Wrecking Ball" by Miley Cyrus; "Heart Attack" by Demi Lovato
2015	Taylor Swift	"Shake It Off"	"Dark Horse" by Katy Perry (featuring Juicy J); "Don't Stop" by 5 Seconds of Summer; "Drunk in Love" by Beyoncé (featuring Jay-Z); "Steal My Girl" by One Direction
2016	Taylor Swift (featuring Kendrick Lamar)	"Bad Blood"	"Drag Me Down" by One Direction; "One Last Time" by Ariana Grande; "She's Kinda Hot" by 5 Seconds of Summer; "Where Are Ü Now" by Skrillex & Diplo (with Justin Bieber)
2017	The Chainsmokers (featuring Halsey)	"Closer"	"History" by One Direction; "Jet Black Heart" by 5 Seconds of Summer; "Shout Out to My Ex" by Little Mix; "Work from Home by Fifth Harmony (featuring Ty Dolla Sign)
2018	Super Junior	"Black Suit"	"Look What You Made Me Do" by Taylor Swift; "Perfect" by Ed Sheeran; "Sign of the Times" by Harry Styles; "Touch" by Little Mix
2019	BTS	"Fake Love"	"Delicate" by Taylor Swift; "Girls Like You" by Maroon 5 featuring Cardi B; "Thank U, Next" by Ariana Grande; "Thru These Tears" by LANY
2020	BTS (featuring Halsey)	"Boy with Luv"	"7 Rings" by Ariana Grande; "Lover" by Taylor Swift; "Señorita" by Shawn Mendes and Camila Cabello; "Sucker" by the Jonas Brothers
2021	BTS	"Dynamite"	"Cardigan" by Taylor Swift; "Rain On Me" by Lady Gaga and Ariana Grande; "Watermelon Sugar" by Harry Styles; "Yummy" by Justin Bieber
2024	Sabrina Carpenter	"Espresso"	"Fortnight" by Taylor Swift featuring Post Malone; "Rockstar" by Lisa; "Water" by Tyla; "We Can't Be Friends (Wait for Your Love)" by Ariana Grande

== Multiple wins and nominations ==
Wins
3	Taylor Swift
3	BTS
2	Halsey
2	Katy Perry
2	My Chemical Romance
Nominations
9	Taylor Swift
6	One Direction
5	Ariana Grande
5	Justin Bieber
4	Katy Perry
3	5 Seconds of Summer
3	BTS
3	Lady Gaga
3	Maroon 5
3	Miley Cyrus
2	Beyoncé
2	Bruno Mars
2	Halsey
2	Harry Styles
2	Jonas Brothers
2	Little Mix
2	My Chemical Romance
2	The Black Eyed Peas
2	The Pussycat Dolls
2	Rihanna
