= Myx Music Awards 2015 =

Annual Philippine music awards ceremony

- Date: March 25, 2015
- Location: Samsung Hall, Taguig
- Country: Philippines
- Hosted by: Myx video jockeys

Highlights
- Most wins: Sarah Geronimo (4)
- Most nominations: Julie Anne San Jose (7)
- Website: www.myxph.com/myxmusicawards/

Television/radio coverage
- Network: Myx
- Produced by: Myx

Myx Music Awards 2015 was the 10th Myx Music Awards, an annual music awards ceremony established in 2006. The nominees were announced in February 2015, and the awards ceremony was held on March 25, 2015. Sarah Geronimo was the ceremony's most-awarded artist, receiving four awards. As with the 2012, 2013, and 2014 ceremonies, fans could vote for the nominees online through the Myx website and its official Facebook and Twitter accounts.

== Performers ==
The ceremony featured performances from several artists, including James Reid and Nadine Lustre.

== Winners and nominees ==
Winners are listed first and highlighted in boldface.

Myx Magna Award (Special Award)	Favorite Music Video
**Rey Valera**	**"Tayo" – Sarah Geronimo (Dir. Avid Liongoren)**; "Dedma" – Abra & Julie Anne San Jose (Dir. Joy Aquino); "Dito Na Lang" – Kyla (Dir. Treb Monteras II); "Ikaw" – Yeng Constantino (Dir. Cristhian Escolano); "Takipsilim" – Gloc-9 feat. Regine Velasquez-Alcasid (Dir. Christopher Santos)
Favorite Song	Favorite Artist
**"Simpleng Tulad Mo" – Daniel Padilla**; "Dito Na Lang" – Kyla; "Mahal Ko O Mahal Ako" – KZ Tandingan; "No Erase" – James Reid & Nadine Lustre; "This Love Is Like" – Toni Gonzaga	**Sarah Geronimo**; Yeng Constantino; Gloc-9; Daniel Padilla; Julie Anne San Jose
Favorite Male Artist	Favorite Female Artist
**Daniel Padilla**; Abra; Gloc-9; Jay R; James Reid	**Sarah Geronimo**; Yeng Constantino; Toni Gonzaga; Kyla; Julie Anne San Jose
Favorite Group	Favorite New Artist
**Silent Sanctuary**; Chicosci; Kamikazee; Slapshock; Sponge Cola	**Darren Espanto**; Kathryn Bernardo; Lyca Gairanod; Nadine Lustre; Maja Salvador
Favorite Urban Video	Favorite Rock Video
**"Businessman" – Gloc-9 feat. Vinci Montaner (Dir. J. Pacena II)**; "Abante" – Loonie feat. Kat Agarrado (Dir. Jasper Salimbangon); "Dedma" – Abra & Julie Anne San Jose (Dir. Joy Aquino); "Parachute" – Jay R (Dir. Cristhian Escolano); "Puyat" – Rjay Ty feat. Ron Henley (Dir. Ken Yamaguchi)	**"Kislap" – Kamikazee (Dir. Kamikazee)**; "Happier This Way" – Save Me Hollywood (Dir. Mihk Vergara); "Ikot" – The Oktaves (Dir. Ely Buendia); "Out of Control" – Pupil (Dir. Erin Pascual); "Unshakable" – Slapshock (Dir. Paolo Abella)
Favorite Mellow Video	Favorite Collaboration
**"Right Where You Belong" – Julie Anne San Jose (Dir. Louie Ignacio)**; "Bahala Na" – James Reid & Nadine Lustre (Dir. Miggy Tanchanco); "Dito Na Lang" – Kyla (Dir. Treb Monteras II); "Ikaw" – Yeng Constantino (Dir. Cristhian Escolano); "Simpleng Tulad Mo" – Daniel Padilla (Dir. PUP students)	**"Takipsilim" – Gloc-9 feat. Regine Velasquez-Alcasid**; "+63" – Sponge Cola feat. Yeng Constantino; "Dedma" – Abra & Julie Anne San Jose; "Digmaan" – Quest feat. Julie Anne San Jose; "Qrush On You" – Jay R, Elmo Magalona & Q-York
Favorite Remake	Favorite Media Soundtrack
**"Maybe This Time" – Sarah Geronimo (Original: David Pomeranz)**; "How Could an Angel Break My Heart" – Charice feat. Alyssa Quijano; "Islands in the Stream" – Kean Cipriano & Eunice Jorge; "Pangarap na Bituin" – Lyca Gairanod; "Somebody to Love" – Darren Espanto	**"No Erase" – James Reid & Nadine Lustre (Diary ng Panget)**; "Do the Moves" – Sarah Geronimo, Apl.De.Ap and Enrique Gil (Rexona); "Dyosa" – Yumi Lacsamana (Diary ng Panget); "Till I Met You" – Angeline Quinto (She's Dating the Gangster); "Unlimited and Free" – Daniel Padilla (ABS-CBNmobile)
Favorite Guest Appearance In A Music Video	Favorite MYX Celebrity VJ
**Kathryn Bernardo ("Simpleng Tulad Mo" by Daniel Padilla)**; Ellen Adarna ("Ikot" by The Oktaves); Dingdong Dantes & Marian Rivera ("Tayo Lang Dalawa" by Rivermaya); James Reid ("Mr. Antipatiko" by Nadine Lustre); Janella Salvador ("Chinito Problems" by Enchong Dee)	**Toni Gonzaga**; Enchong Dee; Xian Lim; Kylie Padilla; Maja Salvador
Favorite International Video	Favorite K-Pop Video
**"Shake It Off" – Taylor Swift**; "Dark Horse" – Katy Perry feat. Juicy J; "Don't Stop" – 5 Seconds of Summer; "Drunk in Love" – Beyoncé feat. Jay Z; "Steal My Girl" – One Direction	**"Come Back Home" – 2NE1**; "Eyes, Nose, Lips" – Taeyang; "Mr. Mr." – Girls' Generation; "Overdose" – Exo; "Still You" – Lee Donghae & Eunhyuk

== Multiple awards ==
=== Artist(s) with multiple wins ===
The following artist(s) received two or more awards:

Wins	Artist(s)
4	Sarah Geronimo
2	Gloc-9
2	Daniel Padilla

=== Artist(s) with multiple nominations ===
The following artist(s) received more than two nominations:

Nominations	Artist(s)
7	Julie Anne San Jose
5	Sarah Geronimo
5	Yeng Constantino
5	Gloc-9
5	Daniel Padilla
4	Abra
4	Kyla
4	James Reid
4	Nadine Lustre
3	Toni Gonzaga
3	Jay R
