= Myx Music Awards 2018 =

Annual Philippine music awards ceremony

- Date: May 15, 2018
- Location: Smart Araneta Coliseum, Cubao, Quezon City
- Country: Philippines
- Hosted by: Myx VJs

Highlights
- Most awards: James Reid (4)
- Most nominations: Jona, James Reid and Sarah Geronimo (5)
- Website: myx.abs-cbn.com/myxmusicawards

Television/radio coverage
- Network: Myx

Myx Music Awards 2018 was the 13th installment of the Myx Music Awards, acknowledging the biggest hit makers of 2017 in the Philippine music industry. For the seventh consecutive year, fans could vote online through the Myx website.

Nominees were announced on February 28, 2018 starting at 12nn via Facebook Live streaming. Leading the nominees were Jona, James Reid and Sarah Geronimo with five nominations, each.

It may have been noticed that the category names were changed this year replacing the word Favorite into of the year. This year also marks the return of Favorite MYX Bandarito Performance category which was last included in 2010.

For the first time in history of the awards, Twitter Philippines given MYX Music Awards 2018 an exclusive emoji for using hashtags #MYXMusicAwards2018 and #MMAs2018. On May 6, 2018, the popular streaming service, Spotify made an exclusive playlist of songs nominated on the awards.

The awards night was held on May 15, 2018 at the Smart Araneta Coliseum. The very first MYX Squadfest was also held on the venue as a pre-programming for the main award show.

== Winners and nominees ==
Winners are listed first and highlighted in boldface.

Myx Magna Award (special award)	Music Video of the Year
**Martin Nievera**	**"The Life" – James Reid (Dir. Nadine Lustre and Petersen Vargas)**; "C@LL" – Bamboo (Dir. Paul Basinillo); "Cebuana" – Karencitta (Dir. Karencitta and Paul Martin); "Misteryo" – Sarah Geronimo (Dir. Nolan Bernardino); "Sa 'Yo Pa Rin" – Glaiza de Castro (Dir. Kring Elenzano-Kim)
Song of the Year	Artist of the Year
**"Cool Down" – James Reid**; "Ano Nga Ba Tayo?" – Jona; "Kaibigan Mo" – Sarah Geronimo feat. Yeng Constantino; "Sa 'Yo Pa Rin" – Glaiza de Castro; "Titibo-Tibo" – Moira Dela Torre	**James Reid**; Darren Espanto; Iñigo Pascual; KZ; Sarah Geronimo
Male Artist of the Year	Female Artist of the Year
**James Reid**; Darren Espanto; Iñigo Pascual; Quest; TJ Monterde	**Sarah Geronimo**; Glaiza de Castro; Jona; KZ; Morissette
Group of the Year	New Artist of the Year
**Boyband PH**; Gimme 5; IV of Spades; Silent Sanctuary; The Juans	**IV of Spades**; Karencitta; Leanne and Naara; Sassa; Volts Vallejo
Mellow Video of the Year	Rock Video of the Year
**"Malaya" – Moira Dela Torre (Dir. John Prats)**; "Ano Nga Ba Tayo?" – Jona (Dir. Giselle Andres); "Fly Tonight" – Ylona Garcia (Dir. Alco Guerrero); "Naririnig Mo Ba" – Morissette (Dir. Miguel Potestades); "Walang Hanggan" – Quest (Dir. James Muleta)	**"Balewala" – Brisom (Dir. Kevin Dayrit)**; "Against The Ropes" – Typecast feat. Reg Rubio (Dir. Arvin Kaliboy Belarmino); "Disease" – Philia (Dir. Jeremy Jay Abano and Ramona Thornes); "Laro" – Autotelic (Dir. Jiggy Gregorio); "Take Me Down" – Mr. Bones and the Boneyard Circus (Dir. Pedring Lopez)
Urban Video of the Year	Collaboration of the Year
**"Labo" – KZ (Dir. Kean Cipriano)**; "Bituin" – Shehyee feat. Keiko Necesario (Dir. Tey Clamor); "Does She Know?" – Kiana Valenciano feat. Curtismith (Dir. Gabriel Valenciano); "Ice Tubig" – Gloc-9 feat. Mike Luis (Dir. Christopher Santos); "Tagay" – Quest (Dir. Andrei Antonio)	**"Kaibigan Mo" – Sarah Geronimo feat. Yeng Constantino**; "I’ll Be There" – Darren Espanto and Jed Madela; "Tayo Nalang Kasi" – Jason Dy and Kyla; "'Til The End of Time" – Jona and Boyband PH; "Tumalon" – Julian Trono and Ella Cruz
Remake of the Year	Media Soundtrack of the Year
**"I'll Be There" – Darren Espanto and Jed Madela (Original by The Jackson 5)**; "Can't Help Falling in Love" – Daniel Padilla (Original by Elvis Presley); "If We Fall in Love" – McCoy de Leon and Elisse Joson (Original by Yeng Constantino and RJ Jimenez); "Somebody" – Boyband PH (Original by Depeche Mode); "Why Can’t It Be?" – Kaye Cal (Original by "Rannie Raymundo")	**"Two Less Lonely People in the World" – KZ (from Kita Kita)**; "Alon" – Hale (from Siargao); "Balisong" – The Juans (from 100 Tula Para Kay Stella); "Pusong Ligaw" – Jona (from Pusong Ligaw); "Torete" – Moira Dela Torre (from Love You To The Stars and Back)
Music Video Guest Appearance of the Year	International Video of the Year
**Nadine Lustre ("The Life" - James Reid)**; Angelica Panganiban and Sam Milby ("Malaya" - Moira Dela Torre); Arci Muñoz ("Why Can’t It Be?" - Kaye Cal); Kisses Delavin and Marco Gallo ("Kulay" - Young JV); Maja Salvador and John Lloyd Cruz ("Lloydy" - Paulo Avelino)	**"Black Suit" - Super Junior**; "Look What You Made Me Do" - Taylor Swift; "Perfect" - Ed Sheeran; "Sign of the Times" - Harry Styles; "Touch" - Little Mix
MYX Celebrity VJ of the Year	MYX Bandarito Performance of the Year
**Edward Barber**; Boyband PH; Empoy; Juan Karlos Labajo; Kim Chiu; Kira Balinger; Kisses Delavin and Marco Gallo; Kyle Echarri; Leila Alcasid; Maris Racal; Maymay Entrata; McCoy de Leon and Elisse Joson	**IV of Spades**; Brisom; Keiko Necesario; Snakefight; Zsaris

== Multiple awards ==
=== Artists with multiple wins ===
The following artists received two or more awards:

Wins	Artists
4	James Reid
2	IV of Spades
2	Sarah Geronimo

=== Artists with multiple nominations ===
The following artists received more than two nominations:

Nominations	Artists
5	James Reid
5	Jona
5	Sarah Geronimo
4	BoybandPH
4	Darren Espanto
4	KZ Tandingan
4	Moira Dela Torre
3	Glaiza de Castro
3	IV of Spades
