= Rain on Me (Lady Gaga and Ariana Grande song) =

2020 single by Lady Gaga and Ariana Grande

Single by Lady Gaga and Ariana Grande

from the album Chromatica
- Released: May 22, 2020
- Studio: Conway (Hollywood); MXM, Henson (Los Angeles)
- Genre: House; dance-pop; disco
- Length: 3:02
- Label: Interscope
- Songwriters: Lady Gaga; BloodPop; Matthew Burns; Nija Charles; Rami Yacoub; Martin Joseph Léonard Bresso; Ariana Grande; Alexander Ridha
- Producers: BloodPop; Burns

Lady Gaga singles chronology
"Stupid Love" (2020)	"Rain on Me" (2020)	"911" (2020)

Ariana Grande singles chronology
"Stuck with U" (2020)	"Rain on Me" (2020)	"Positions" (2020)

Music video
- "Rain on Me" on YouTube

"Rain on Me" is a song by American singers Lady Gaga and Ariana Grande from Gaga's sixth studio album, Chromatica (2020). They co-wrote it with Nija Charles, Rami Yacoub, Tchami, Boys Noize and its producers, BloodPop and Burns. An upbeat house, dance-pop and disco song, the track features a synth-disco beat and funk guitars. It explores resilience in defiance of the hardships in life, using rain as a metaphor for alcohol and its role in numbing emotional pain.

"Rain on Me" was released by Interscope Records as the album's second single on May 22, 2020. Music critics lauded the singers' vocals as well as the song's message. Upon entering at the top of the Billboard Hot 100, the track became Gaga's fifth and Grande's fourth number-one single in the United States. It marked the first all-female collaboration to debut atop the chart and made Grande the first artist to have four songs debut at the top spot. On Spotify, "Rain on Me" was the seventh most streamed song of summer 2020 and the most streamed song by a female artist globally during the season. Additionally, "Rain on Me" topped the charts in Canada, Croatia, Greece, Hungary, Ireland, Israel, Scotland, Singapore, and the United Kingdom.

The accompanying music video was directed by filmmaker Robert Rodriguez, and features Gaga and Grande dancing inside a giant arena during a rainstorm, with daggers falling from the sky. "Rain on Me" was nominated for seven MTV Video Music Awards, winning for Song of the Year and two other awards while being nominated for Video of the Year. The duo performed "Rain on Me" at the 2020 MTV Video Music Awards, while Gaga and Grande later included the song in their respective concert tours, The Chromatica Ball (2022) and The Eternal Sunshine Tour (2026). "Rain on Me" was further promoted with the release of mock news broadcasts in partnership with The Weather Channel in which Gaga and Grande both appeared. The song won the Best Pop Duo/Group Performance category at the 63rd Annual Grammy Awards, being the first female collaboration in history to win the category.

== Background ==
"Rain on Me" is a song by American singers Lady Gaga and Ariana Grande from Gaga's sixth studio album, Chromatica (2020), appearing as the fourth track in its track list. It was first referenced by Gaga in a March 2020 interview with Paper, at a time when her collaboration with Grande had not yet been revealed. She described it as a "celebration of all the tears". Gaga also revealed that the track was created with another prominent female pop artist who had likewise endured intense public scrutiny and trauma. She explained that the song emerged from deeply personal conversations about their lives, framing it as an exchange between two women reflecting on resilience, perseverance, and gratitude.

Speaking further on Apple Music's Beats 1 during a May 2020 interview with Zane Lowe, Gaga further talked about the writing process of the song. She said that Grande approached the collaboration with empathy and openness, rather than merely arriving to record vocals. Gaga noted that she encouraged Grande to take an active role, asking what she needed and how she wanted to work. During one studio session, Gaga was still emotionally distressed, and Grande responded with persistent gestures of support, telling her, "You're gonna be alright," and repeatedly reaching out in an effort to build a friendship. Gaga later admitted she initially pulled back out of shame and a reluctance to project her emotional state onto Grande, but a candid exchange—when Grande told her, "you're hiding"—became a turning point that strengthened their connection.

== Recording and mixing ==
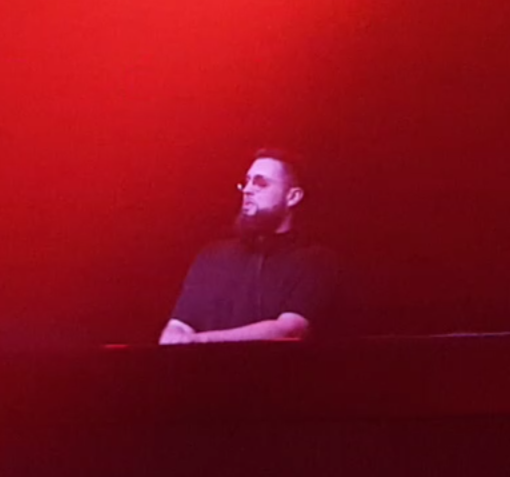
French DJ and producer Tchami, who contributed an early production version of "Rain on Me"

"Rain on Me" was written by Gaga, Grande, Burns, Nija Charles, Rami Yacoub, Bresso, Boys Noize and Chromatica executive producer BloodPop. It was produced by Burns, Bloodpop, with Tchami credited for additional production. Burns said his aim was to channel the kinetic spirit of classic house records such as Roger Sanchez's "Another Chance" and Stardust's "Music Sounds Better with You", creating a track that would "feel classic but modern at the same time." The song initially existed as a stripped-back acid house demo, but Burns explained that its sound evolved substantially during production. While the team recognized the song's strength, they felt the early version did not fully align with the album's sonic direction. At BloodPop's request, Burns reworked the instrumental, experimenting with new chord movements and progressions to shift its emotional tone. During this process, he instinctively introduced a bassline inspired by Gwen McCrae's "All This Love That I'm Givin" beneath the chorus, a change that marked a decisive breakthrough and clarified the track's final direction. The finished track has been noted by some listeners for its French house character, drawing comparisons to Daft Punk, while producer Tchami later revealed that an earlier version he worked on did not make the final cut, though BloodPop and Burns retained select elements from previous drafts when reworking the production. The collaboration also represented a notable milestone for Nija Charles, who felt that, as a young Black producer and songwriter, she had often been confined by industry expectations to R&B and hip-hop.

Recording and mixing of the track took place during the broader Chromatica sessions, which were developed over roughly two years across several studios in Los Angeles, including EastWest Studios, Westlake Recording Studios and Henson Recording Studios. Gaga's longtime engineer and vocal producer Benjamin Rice oversaw the recording and vocal production, working closely with Gaga and the song's producers during writing and production sessions. Rice employed an iterative workflow in which vocals recorded during early songwriting sessions could later be incorporated into the final arrangement, compiling and refining numerous takes over time. The final mix was completed through a collaborative process between Rice and mixer Tom Norris: Rice focused primarily on the vocal production and mixing, while Norris handled the instrumental elements and overall sonic balance. Norris later described "Rain on Me" as one of the most involved tracks on the album, noting that it underwent multiple production revisions and mixing adjustments over several months before the final version was completed.

== Composition ==
"Rain on Me"
An 18-second sample of the house-pop chorus, featuring Gaga's spoken-word deliveries, with the beats building up to a techno beat drop.

"Rain on Me" is a house, dance-pop, and disco song, with electropop, French house, and Eurodance elements. It was composed using 4/4 common time in the key of C♯ minor, with a tempo of 123 beats per minute. Most of the song follows a C♯m^{7}–Amaj^{9} sequence, while the first verse and second pre-chorus add a B(add^{4}) and both pre-choruses include an F♯m^{11} at the end. The track features an upbeat production consisting of synth-pop instrumentals, an R&B-influenced synth-disco beat, synth claps, funk guitar strums, and rolling synths. It opens with a stripped-down verse with Gaga's vocals at the forefront. Then, a French house bass and thundering percussion play in the background. The mid-90s house-pop hook contains a pitched-down vocal loop. In the chorus, which is described as thundering, the beats build up, which then drops into a techno beat. After doing ad-libs, Grande joins in the second verse, where hand-clapped beats are added. The final chorus "explodes" with the singers belting the song.

Gaga's and Grande's vocals, which were described as "booming", span from the low note of G♯_{3} to the high note of B_{5}. Vocally, Gaga makes use of spoken word deliveries, and Grande uses her "signature" high note octave. Lyrically, the song addresses perseverance through hardship, emphasizing that emotional vulnerability—such as crying, stumbling, and falling apart—is a necessary part of survival, healing, and finding meaning in painful experiences. Rain is used as a metaphor for alcohol and its role in numbing emotional pain, informed by Gaga's reflections on heartbreak and sobriety. She has explained that the chorus was written to intentionally suggest both intoxication and sobriety, with its opening line sounding like either "I'd rather be drunk" or "I'd rather be dry," underscoring the song's central tension between numbing pain and pursuing healing.

== Release and promotion ==
"Rain on Me" was officially announced on April 22, 2020, when Gaga shared the tracklist of her Chromatica album. On May 15, 2020, both Gaga and Grande posted the single's cover art on Instagram and Twitter to announce its release a week later. It was issued as the album's second single on May 21, 2020, at 21:00 PT (4:00 UTC on May 22, 2020). The song was also promoted through an Amazon Music lyric video commercial. To coincide with the single release, rain-themed merchandise items were made available in Gaga's official online store, such as rainboots, ponchos, and umbrellas. On May 27, 2020, a limited 7-inch vinyl with alternate artwork became available to ship on Lady Gaga's official web store.

On May 26, 2020, Gaga and Grande shared a one-minute promotional skit in partnership with The Weather Channel, delivering a mock weather forecast while holding an umbrella and joking about wanting to "celebrate the rain". A second weather-themed clip followed on May 28, filmed in Gaga's pool and Grande's bathtub. On August 26, 2020, Gaga announced an online competition offering a $10,000 cash prize, inviting participants to design a "Rain on Me"–inspired poster using Adobe creative applications.

== Critical reception ==
"Rain on Me" received widespread critical acclaim following its release, with several outlets considering it one of Gaga's strongest releases. Contributors of Vulture and Attitude predicted the song would be especially popular with her gay audience. Many critics praised the track's euphoric production and emotional tone, frequently describing it as a cathartic and empowering dance anthem. Adam White of The Independent called it "three minutes of euphoric melodrama" and a "theatrical and replenishing triumph", while Joey Nolfi of Entertainment Weekly wrote that the song takes listeners "to sonic heaven" with its "therapeutic banger" energy. Mikael Wood of the Los Angeles Times similarly described it as a "fist-pumping self-empowerment jam".

Reviewers also highlighted the chemistry between Gaga and Grande, emphasizing how their vocal interplay strengthens the song's impact. Rania Aniftos of Billboard praised the track for foregrounding the powerful vocals of both Grande and Gaga. Althea Legapsi of Rolling Stone labeled the track "rejuvenating", noting its call-and-response structure as the singers "tout the rejuvenating aspects of the situation, despite the metaphorical bad weather sentiments." Quinn Moreland of Pitchfork likewise praised the emotional connection between the two artists, writing that the song "draws its power from two women connecting on an emotional level." Dave Quinn of People singled out Grande's "signature high note octaves" alongside Gaga's "bold voice". Matt Melis of Consequence wrote that "Gaga and Grande have vocal chops for miles", and called it a "dynamite feature". He also highlighted its uplifting message: "No matter how bad the storm gets, we will endure and perhaps come out a little cleaner on the other side for the pain."

Several critics focused on the song's large-scale pop craftsmanship and emotional intensity. Billboard's staff ranked "Rain on Me" as the second-best track on Chromatica, citing its uplifting songwriting and the "tour de force" production. Allison Stewart of The Washington Post described it as a "big-voiced superdiva summit" that is "engineered to be irresistible". In a rave review, Brenden Wetmore of Paper felt "Rain on Me" is "absolutely electric by its end, having charged up enough raw emotion and heartbreak to power an entire circuit party's worth of strobe lights." Craig Jenkins of Vulture similarly praised the vocals and beat, suggesting the track's appeal lies in its “nebulous quality” that allows the lyrics to feel both specific and universal. Chris DeVille of Stereogum also pointed to the song's "genuine catharsis".

A less enthusiastic reaction came from Slant Magazine's Alexa Camp. While she viewed "Rain on Me" as a step up from the prior single "Stupid Love", she described it as "two overzealous vocalists duking it out to see who can out-sing the other over the course of the track's three chart-maximizing minutes" and criticized the song's bridge.

=== Year-end lists ===
"Rain on Me" was considered one of the best songs of 2020 by many critics. Journalists from Billboard, The Guardian, and the Official Charts Company all named it the year's top song, receiving praise for its transcendent quality, the chemistry between Gaga and Grande, and its polished, uplifting pop sound. Chris DeVille from Stereogum selected "Rain on Me" as the best pop song of 2020, calling it an "epic" dance track that "finds euphoria in resilience." Lindsay Zoladz of The New York Times ranked the song as the year's fifth best, contrasting it with Gaga's debut single "Just Dance" (2008) by noting that it is not about partying while blackout, but about the importance of partying on in spite of past trauma. Journalists from DIY and Insider both ranked it as the seventh best, praising the production and its "look on the bright side" sentiment. Writers from Vulture and Pitchfork ranked it as the year's tenth and eleventh best song, respectively, describing it as Gaga's return to carefree pop following a period which focused on more "serious" music, including her jazz collaborations with Tony Bennett and her work on A Star Is Born.

Select rankings of "Rain on Me"
Publication	List	Rank	Ref.
Billboard	The 100 Best Songs of 2020	1	
DIY	Best Tracks of 2020	7	
The Guardian	The 20 Best Songs of 2020	1	
Insider	The 30 Best Songs of 2020	7	
The New York Times	Lindsay Zoladz's Best Songs of 2020	5	
Official Charts Company	Helen Ainsley's Favourite Songs of 2020	1	
Pitchfork	The 100 Best Songs of 2020	11	
Slate	Chris Molanphy's Top 20 Singles of 2020	2	
Stereogum	The Top 40 Pop Songs of 2020	1	
Vulture	The Best Songs of 2020	10	

=== Retrospective commentary ===
Retrospective assessments later situated "Rain on Me" within the cultural context of the COVID-19 lockdown period. Writing for Stereogum, Tom Breihan argued that while the track does not endure as one of the definitive hits from either Gaga or Grande, it stood out from many of the era's short-lived pop collaborations. He wrote that the song was conceived as an anthem about processing trauma through movement, and that it unexpectedly met a demand for dance music at a time when audiences could only nostalgically recall club experiences, lending it a sense of immediacy rather than distance. Mikael Wood of the Los Angeles Times described the song as "a touchstone of the early-COVID era", emphasizing how its message of resilience shaped its reception. Writing for Vulture, Kristen S. Hé reflected that the track—alongside Dua Lipa's Future Nostalgia—served as one of the few sources of unfiltered joy during the darkest months of 2020, becoming inseparable from memories of loss, growth, and healing. Brittany Spanos of Rolling Stone similarly characterized "Rain on Me" as a surge of optimism and energy that resonated powerfully amid the uncertainty and pain of that period, framing it as a life-affirming release whose significance has become clearer in hindsight as enjoying music in shared, public settings once again became possible. Carly May Gravley of the Dallas Observer likewise referred to the track as "the unofficial dance anthem of the year when no one was dancing."

== Commercial performance ==
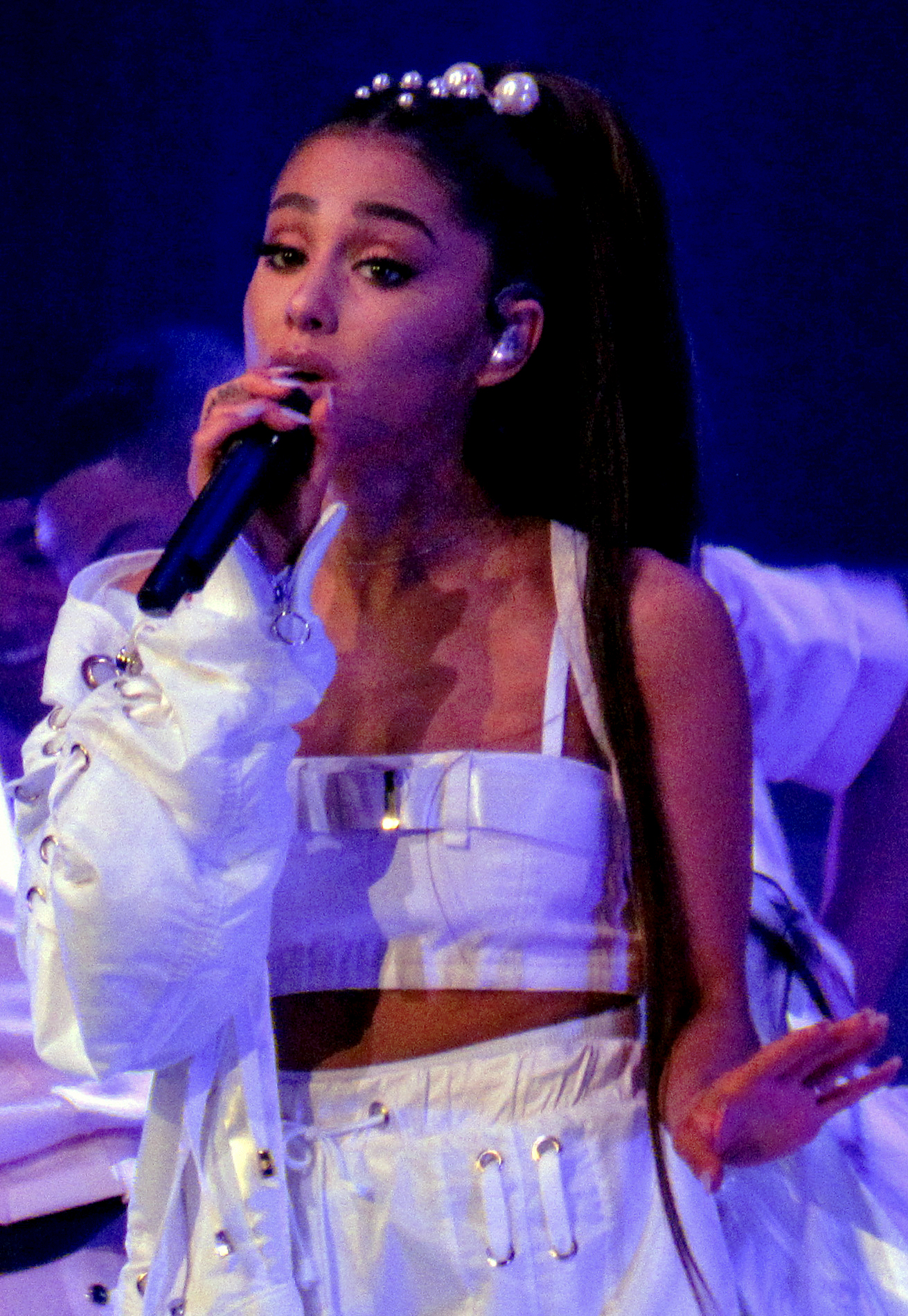
With "Rain on Me", Grande broke the record for the most number one debuts on the US Billboard Hot 100, with four songs.

"Rain on Me" debuted at number one on the Billboard Hot 100, marking Gaga's fifth and Grande's fourth number chart-topping single. The debut also represented Gaga's seventeenth top-ten entry and Grande's sixteenth, and made the song the first all-female collaboration to enter the chart at number one. It became Gaga's second single to debut at the summit, following "Born This Way", making her the fourth female artist—after Mariah Carey, Britney Spears, and Grande—and the seventh artist overall to achieve two number-one debuts. Gaga further became the third artist, after Carey and Beyoncé, to earn a number-one single in the 2000s, 2010s, and 2020s. Meanwhile, Grande set a new record as the first artist to debut four singles at number one on the Hot 100. Gaga earned her eighth number-one on the Digital Song Sales chart, while Grande secured her seventh. In its opening week, the song generated 31.5 million streams, sold 73,000 downloads, and reached an audience of 11.1 million impressions. On March 17, 2021, "Rain on Me" was certified double platinum by the Recording Industry Association of America (RIAA) for exceeding two million units in the United States. Its sales were bolstered by multiple physical and digital bundle offerings, including cassette, CD, and vinyl singles paired with digital downloads.

In the United Kingdom, "Rain on Me" debuted at number one on the UK Singles Chart, becoming the sixth chart-topper for both artists and Gaga's first single to debut at the summit. The achievement made Gaga the fourth female artist to score a UK number-one across three consecutive decades. The song registered 70,000 chart sales in its opening week, surpassing DaBaby's "Rockstar", and recorded the highest first-week streaming total ever for an all-female collaboration in the UK, with 8.1 million streams. With six number-one singles each, Gaga and Grande matched Britney Spears and Rod Stewart for the tenth-most chart-toppers in UK history. Accumulating 515,000 chart sales over three months, the track became the third best-selling song of summer 2020 in the UK and the biggest song by a female artist that season. It finished 2020 as the seventeenth biggest song overall, the fourth biggest by female artists, the twelfth best-selling single, and the twentieth most-streamed track of the year. By February 2025, the song had sold 1.7 million equivalent units and amassed 196 million streams in the UK, and in February 2026 it was certified triple platinum by the British Phonographic Industry (BPI).

In Ireland, "Rain on Me" debuted atop the Irish Singles Chart, becoming Grande's sixth and Gaga's seventh number-one single in the country. It delivered the strongest first-week performance of 2020, overtaking Billie Eilish's "No Time to Die". "Rain on Me" marked Gaga's first debut at number one in more than nine years, following 2011's "Born This Way", while it became Grande's sixth chart-topper in Ireland. With the achievement, Grande equaled Rihanna's record for the most Irish number-one singles by a female artist over the previous decade. "Rain on Me" was the 20th biggest song of 2020 in Ireland and the 5th biggest song by a female artist in the country. It was also the fastest-selling single of 2020.

In Canada, "Rain on Me" entered the Canadian Hot 100 chart at the top position on the issue dated June 6, 2020, becoming Gaga's sixth and Grande's fourth number one single in the country. It also debuted at number one on the Canadian Digital Songs Sales chart. In Australia, "Rain on Me" debuted at number two on the ARIA Singles Chart dated June 1, 2020, becoming Gaga's fourteenth and Grande's fifteenth top ten singles in the country. For Grande, it is the second top 10 duet single to debut in that tier in three weeks, following "Stuck with U". It remained at number two in its second week, still behind DaBaby's "Rockstar".

Internationally, outside of English-language countries, the song topped the Croatian, Hungarian, Israelian and Singaporean charts, top ten in Austria, Bolivia, Bulgaria, Czech Republic, Finland, Hong Kong, Japan, Malaysia, Mexico, Panama, Norway, Portugal and Germany, top twenty in Denmark and France, top thirty in Iceland and top forty in Venezuela, Colombia and Argentina. On Spotify, "Rain on Me" ranked as the seventh most-streamed song of summer 2020 and was the season's most-streamed track by a female artist worldwide.

== Music video ==
=== Background and production ===
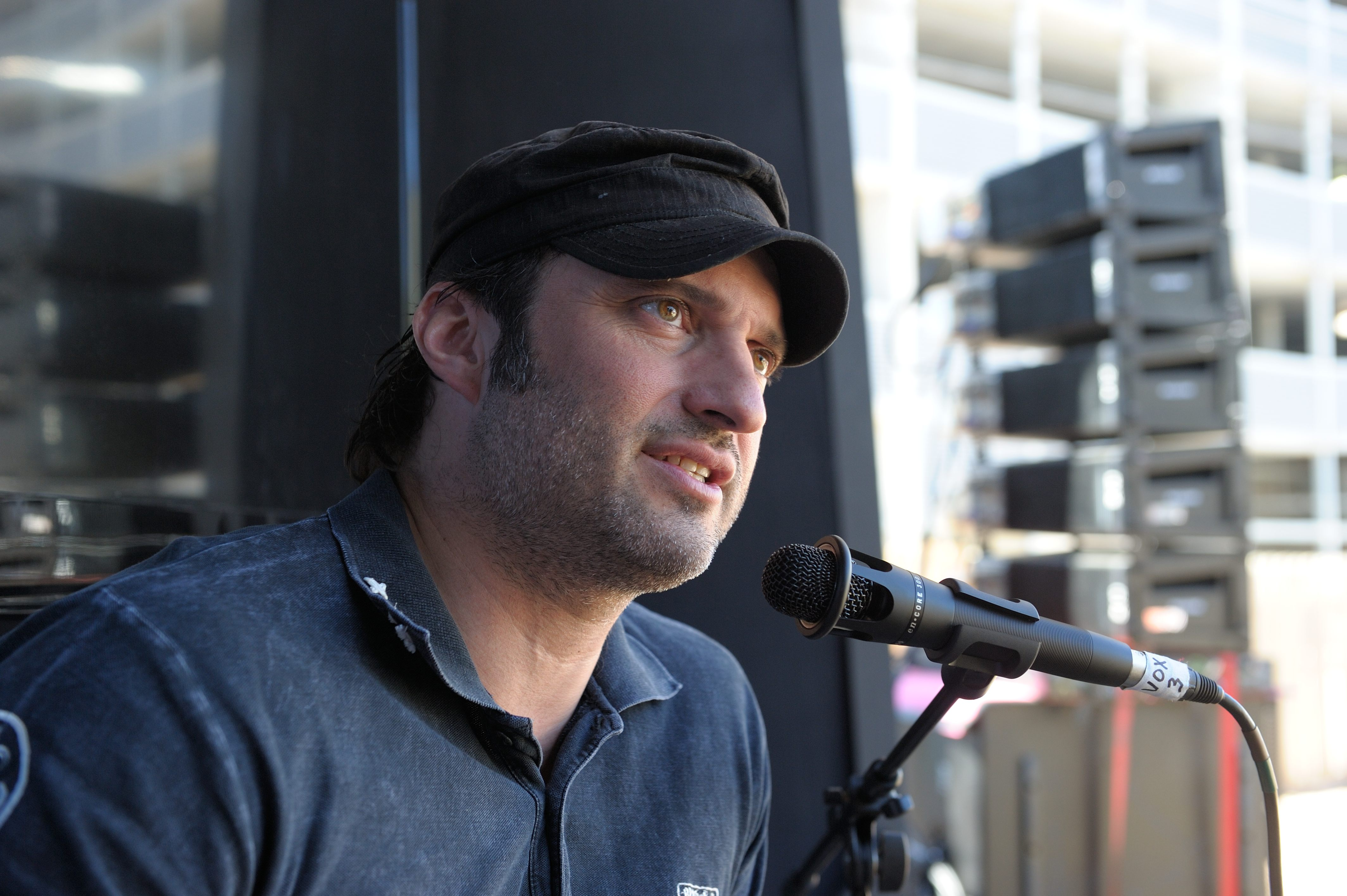
Robert Rodriguez directed the song's music video.

The music video for "Rain on Me" was filmed in Los Angeles from February 20 to 24, 2020, shortly before the state of California went into lockdown due to the COVID-19 pandemic. The fashion of the video features "dominatrix-esque" latex and PVC outfits, designed by Laura Pulice, founder of Vex Clothing. Pulice was approached by Gaga's styling team, Nicola Formichetti and Marta del Rio, who requested sketches for the video. She said that the inspiration for Gaga's look was "futuristic sci-fi punk" and "a heavy metal album sex symbol", whereas Grande's styling was designed to align with her established aesthetic while maintaining the video's futuristic theme. The singers' makeup was done by Sarah Tanno, who used products from Haus Laboratories with the looks intended to appear bold, pop-driven, and infused with a sense of rebellious edge. Choreographer Richy Jackson aimed to create choreography that was uplifting and easy for viewers to recreate, and said he enjoyed tailoring the routines to Gaga's and Grande's individual artistic identities, vocal styles, and contrasting performance qualities.

Prior to the release of the video, Gaga talked with Beats 1's Zane Lowe about working with Grande on the video, saying that "she was so open to trying things that she hasn't done before". The music video was directed by filmmaker Robert Rodriguez, who had previously worked with Gaga on the films Machete Kills (2013) and Sin City: A Dame to Kill For (2014). It premiered on May 22, 2020, at 10 a.m. PT. In the forty-eighth episode of her web series Gagavision, which documented rehearsals and filming of the video, Gaga shared her main goal for the project: "What I really wanna do in this video so much is celebrate women and I wanna show people how to do it."

=== Synopsis and reception ===
Grande and Gaga dancing in the music video. Choreographer Richy Jackson designed the routine to be easy to recreate at home, a quality noted by Vanity Fair and W Magazine, who remarked that it would translate well to TikTok.

The music video opens with Gaga lying on the ground in a pose reminiscent of the Chromatica album artwork, with a dagger embedded in her thigh, which she later removes. She appears dressed in a pink outfit with platform boots, leading a group of similarly dressed dancers, recalling the styling of her earlier video for "Stupid Love". Grande, by contrast, wears a purple ensemble paired with a metallic miniskirt and butterfly-wing detailing, accompanied by a separate troupe of dancers in matching purple attire.

Set inside a vast arena during a simulated rainstorm, the video features choreographed sequences as daggers fall from above. In one sequence, Gaga adopts Grande's signature high ponytail hairstyle, while Grande appears with her hair worn down. The video also includes close-up shots of Gaga behind a glass pane as rain streams down her face, as well as a sequence in which the two singers hold hands with exaggeratedly long hairstyles reminiscent of Sailor Moon, flowing behind them in the wind. The video concludes with the two performers embracing.

The music video drew commentary from multiple critics, who noted its production, choreography, and visual influences. Amy Mackelden of Harper's Bazaar described it as "nothing short of iconic", highlighting its dramatic costume changes and energetic dance routines. Writing for Vanity Fair, Erin Vanderhoof called the video "lavishly produced and animated", and remarked that its choreography was "TikTok–friendly", while also noting that it evoked nostalgia for the pre-coronavirus era. W Magazine's Kyle Munzenrieder similarly observed that the choreography was designed for easy replication on TikTok, noting that the performers remain largely stationary while executing movements viewers could recreate at home.

Other writers focused on the performers' execution and tone. Stefanee Wang of Nylon praised Gaga and Grande's performances, writing that "neither of them miss a single beat", and suggested that the visual "makes a convincing case that, when the world falls, society should really just become a huge dance party." Brendan Wetmore of Paper described the video as "equally as sparkly" as the single itself, writing that it places the two artists "alongside each other for a riot in the rain."

Several critics noted the video for its cyberpunk stylings, and identified influences from science-fiction and video-game aesthetics, drawing comparisons to Blade Runner, Mortal Kombat, Bayonetta, and Final Fantasy VII Remake. The music video attracted 12 million views within its first 11 hours of release.

== Live performances and other appearances ==
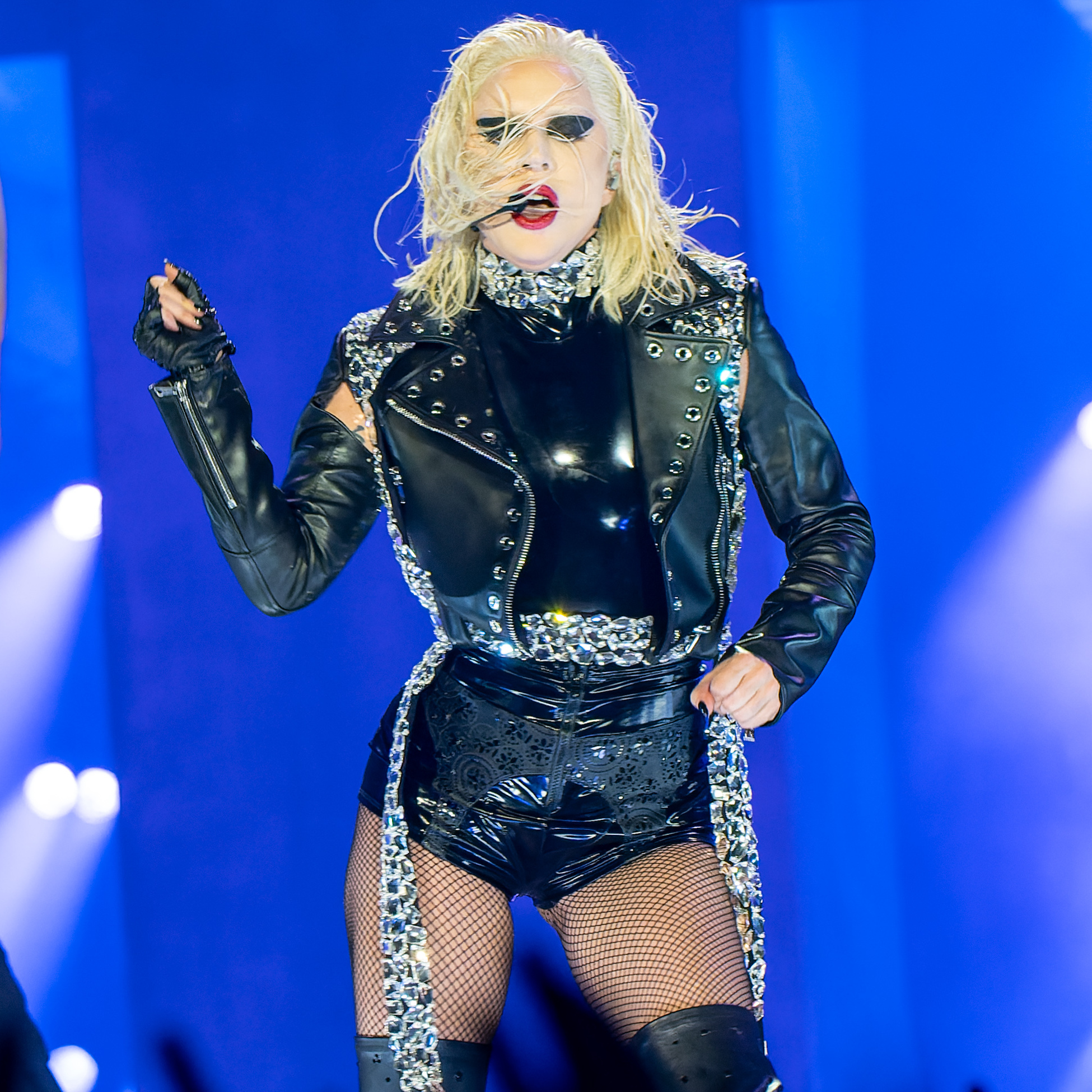
Gaga performing "Rain on Me" on The Chromatica Ball tour, 2022

On August 30, 2020, Gaga and Grande performed "Rain on Me" at the 2020 MTV Video Music Awards, marking its first live performance. The track was part of a medley of songs from Chromatica. After performing "911", Gaga changed into a purple outfit with a spiky shoulder-piece and started singing "Rain on Me". Grande joined her on stage, sporting long pigtails and high, white platform shoes. Accompanied by dancers, they performed the choreography as seen in the music video for the song, which included their synchronized jumping. Joey Nolfi from Entertainment Weekly called the performance "epic", as "the two singers hit high notes and performed exuberant choreography, wearing futuristic masks the entire time."

In 2022, Gaga performed "Rain on Me" at The Chromatica Ball stadium tour, as the penultimate song of the set. She was wearing an Alexander McQueen crystal-embellished latex bodysuit and leather biker jacket, complete with leather biker boots worn over black fishnet stockings. Similarly to the music video, she started singing the song flat on her back. The show in Los Angeles, which was recorded for the concert special Gaga Chromatica Ball, involved fireworks exploding over Dodger Stadium during the closing part of "Rain on Me". Chris Willman of Variety felt that with its tour rendition the song "finally felt as cathartic as Gaga meant it to." In 2025, Gaga presented piano reditions of "Rain on Me" at The Mayhem Ball tour's second show in Miami, and in Brisbane, Australia. The following year, Grande performed it solo during The Eternal Sunshine Tour.

In August 2020, "Rain on Me" was added to the online video game Fortnite's in-game radio stations, and subsequently featured again as part of Gaga's appearance in the Fortnite Festival mode. It was made available in the game's shop as a purchasable Jam Track playable on virtual instruments, alongside a "Rain Check" emote that allows player characters to perform a segment of the song's official choreography. In December 2021, "Rain on Me" was also added to the virtual reality rhythm game Beat Saber.

== Remixes ==
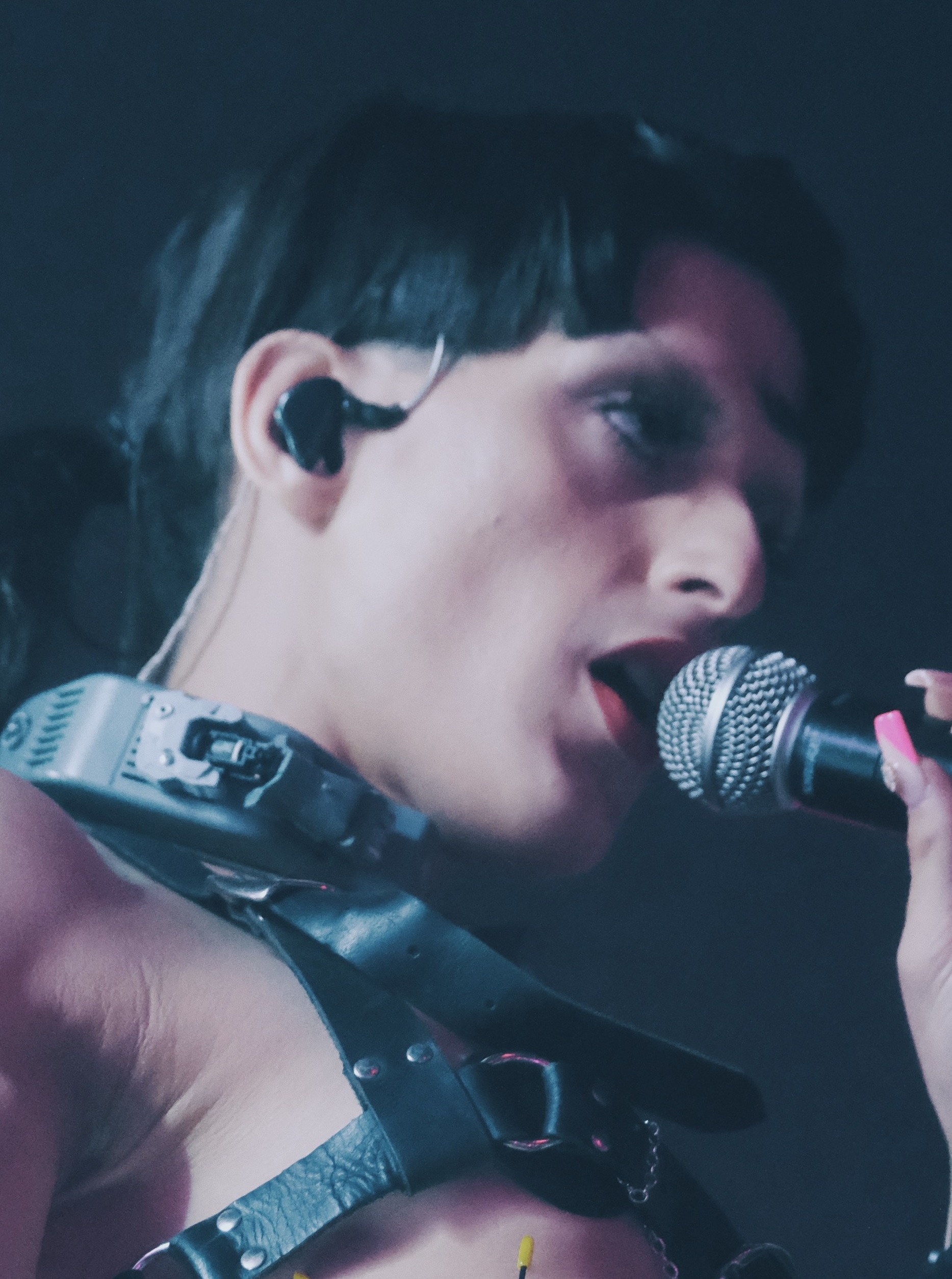
Arca remixed the song for Gaga's remix album, Dawn of Chromatica.

On July 17, 2021, remixes of "Rain on Me" done by Ralphi Rosario and Purple Disco Machine were released digitally. According to an article by the Official Charts Company, the Purple Disco Machine remix arrived amid a surge of high-profile reworks that accompanied the disco revival, helping to solidify his mainstream breakthrough while reworking pop hits into more club-oriented yet faithful versions of the originals. Purple Disco Machine's version incorporates funk elements, while Rosario's remix maintains the house-driven rhythm of the original track. Both producers issued two versions of their remixes—a longer club-oriented mix and a shorter edit.

On August 9, 2021, Venezuelan producer Arca announced via Discord that she produced her own remix of the song for Gaga's third remix album Dawn of Chromatica (2021). Her rendition samples the songs "Time" and "Mequetrefe" off her fourth studio album Kick I (2020), as well as the Changa tuki track "Mételo Sácalo" by DJ Yirvin. In a review of Dawn of Chromatica, Slant Magazine's Alexa Camp praised Arca's remix of the track, claiming that "it offers a glimpse of what Chromatica might have sounded like had Gaga's music lived up to the avant-garde pop image she's created for herself." It also earned the praise of Pitchfork's Jamieson Cox, who thought it was Dawn of Chromatica's "most radical cut" that "situate[s] Gaga and Ariana Grande within Kick I's gossamer avant-pop." Writing for Clash, Robin Murray thought that Arca's "mosaic-like approach" to the deconstruction of the song has "a sly, subversive edge." Sam Murphy of Junkee wrote that Arca's remix emerges from a dense, murky soundscape and gradually reveals the song's sense of euphoria. While the euphoria is harder to access, the track eventually builds to a climax through "glitchy synths and chopped vocals," delivering a "glorious" payoff.

== Accolades ==
"Rain on Me" received widespread recognition from major music and industry bodies for both the song and its accompanying music video. The song won Best Pop Duo/Group Performance at the 63rd Annual Grammy Awards, becoming the first female collaboration to receive the honor. It also earned numerous nominations and wins from organizations such as the MTV Video Music Awards—where it received Song of the Year, Best Collaboration, and Best Cinematography—as well as the American Music Awards, MTV Europe Music Awards, and People's Choice Awards.

Awards and nominations for "Rain on Me"
Organization	Year	Category	Result	Ref.
American Music Awards	2020	Collaboration of the Year	Nominated	
American Music Awards	2020	Favorite Music Video	Nominated	
Billboard Music Awards	2021	Top Dance/Electronic Song	Nominated	
BMI Pop Awards	2021	Most-Performed Songs of the Year	Won	
BreakTudo Awards	2020	International Music Video	Nominated	
Clio Music Awards	2020	Film/Video Craft (Campaign: A Voice Is All You Need)	Gold	
Grammy Awards	2021	Best Pop Duo/Group Performance	Won	
Grindr Unwrapped Awards	2020	Bop of the Year	Won	
Grindr Unwrapped Awards	2020	Gay Gasp of the Year	Won	
Grindr Unwrapped Awards	2020	Most Used Profile Songs	Won	
Grindr Unwrapped Awards	2021	Most Used Profile Songs	3rd place	
Grindr Unwrapped Awards	2023	Most Used Profile Songs	4th place	
iHeartRadio Music Awards	2021	Dance Song of the Year	Nominated	
iHeartRadio Music Awards	2021	Best Music Video	Nominated	
iHeartRadio Music Awards	2021	Favorite Music Video Choreography	Nominated	
Los 40 Music Awards	2020	Best International Video	Nominated	
MTV Europe Music Awards	2020	Best Video	Nominated	
MTV Europe Music Awards	2020	Best Song	Nominated	
MTV Europe Music Awards	2020	Best Collaboration	Nominated	
MTV Millennial Awards Brazil	2020	Global Hit	Won	
MTV Millennial Awards Brazil	2020	International Collaboration	Nominated	
MTV Video Music Awards	2020	Video of the Year	Nominated	
MTV Video Music Awards	2020	Song of the Year	Won	
MTV Video Music Awards	2020	Best Collaboration	Won	
MTV Video Music Awards	2020	Best Pop	Nominated	
MTV Video Music Awards	2020	Best Cinematography	Won	
MTV Video Music Awards	2020	Best Visual Effects	Nominated	
MTV Video Music Awards	2020	Best Choreography	Nominated	
MTV Video Play Awards	2020	Most Played Music Videos	Won	
Myx Music Awards	2021	Favorite International Video	Nominated	
Nickelodeon Kids' Choice Awards	2021	Favorite Music Collaboration	Nominated	
NRJ Music Awards	2020	International Collaboration of the Year	Won	
NRJ Music Awards	2020	Music Video of the Year	Nominated	
People's Choice Awards	2020	Song of 2020	Nominated	
People's Choice Awards	2020	Collaboration of 2020	Nominated	
People's Choice Awards	2020	Music Video of 2020	Nominated	
Queerties Awards	2021	Anthem	Won	
Rockbjörnen	2021	Foreign Song of the Year	Nominated	
RTHK International Pop Poll Awards	2021	Top Ten International Gold Songs	Won	

== Track listing and formats ==
- 7"/cassette/CD/picture disc
1. "Rain on Me" – 3:02
2. "Rain on Me" (instrumental) – 3:02
- Digital download and streaming (Single version)
1. "Rain on Me" – 3:02
- Digital download (Instrumental)
1. "Rain on Me" (instrumental) – 3:02
- Digital download and streaming (Purple Disco Machine remix)
1. "Rain on Me" (Purple Disco Machine remix – edit) – 3:58
2. "Rain on Me" (Purple Disco Machine remix) – 6:34
- Digital download and streaming (Ralphi Rosario remix)
1. "Rain on Me" (Ralph Rosario remix – edit) – 3:58
2. "Rain on Me" (Ralph Rosario remix) – 7:31

== Credits and personnel ==
Credits adapted from the liner notes of Chromatica.

=== Recording locations ===
- Recorded at Conway Recording Studios (Hollywood, California), MXM Studios (Los Angeles, California), and Henson Recording Studios (Los Angeles, California)
- Mastered at Sterling Sound Studios (New York City)

=== Personnel ===
- Lady Gaga – vocals, songwriter
- Ariana Grande – vocals, songwriter
- BloodPop – producer, songwriter
- Burns – producer, songwriter, guitar, bass, drums, keyboards
- Tchami – additional producer, songwriter
- Alexander Ridha – songwriter
- Nija Charles – songwriter
- Rami Yacoub – songwriter
- Leddie Garcia – percussion
- Rachel Mazer – saxophone
- Benjamin Rice – vocal producer, recording engineer, mixer
- Tom Norris – mixer
- E. Scott Kelly – assistant mixer
- Randy Merrill – mastering engineer

== Charts ==
=== Weekly charts ===
Weekly chart performance
Chart (2020)	Peak position
Argentina Hot 100 (Billboard)	35
Australia (ARIA)	2
Austria (Ö3 Austria Top 40)	8
Belgium (Ultratop 50 Flanders)	5
Belgium (Ultratop 50 Wallonia)	10
Bolivia (Monitor Latino)	9
Brazil Airplay (Top 100 Brasil)	42
Bulgaria (PROPHON)	2
Canada Hot 100 (Billboard)	1
Canada AC (Billboard)	1
Canada CHR/Top 40 (Billboard)	2
Canada Hot AC (Billboard)	1
CIS Airplay (TopHit)	3
Colombia (National-Report)	34
Colombia Anglo (Monitor Latino)	6
Costa Rica (Monitor Latino)	9
Croatia (HRT)	1
Czech Republic Airplay (ČNS IFPI)	7
Czech Republic Singles Digital (ČNS IFPI)	4
Denmark (Tracklisten)	14
El Salvador (Monitor Latino)	9
Estonia (Eesti Tipp-40)	2
Euro Digital Song Sales (Billboard)	1
Finland (Suomen virallinen lista)	4
France (SNEP)	12
Germany (GfK)	9
Global 200 (Billboard)	22
Greece International (IFPI)	1
Hong Kong (HKRIA)	6
Hungary (Dance Top 40)	22
Hungary (Rádiós Top 40)	5
Hungary (Single Top 40)	1
Hungary (Stream Top 40)	4
Iceland (Tónlistinn)	24
Ireland (IRMA)	1
Israel (Media Forest)	1
Italy (FIMI)	5
Japan Hot 100 (Billboard)	8
Lebanon (Lebanese Top 20)	2
Lithuania (AGATA)	2
Malaysia (RIM)	2
Mexico Streaming (AMPROFON)	4
Netherlands (Dutch Top 40)	7
Netherlands (Single Top 100)	9
New Zealand (Recorded Music NZ)	2
Norway (VG-lista)	7
Panama (Monitor Latino)	7
Paraguay (Monitor Latino)	6
Poland Airplay (ZPAV)	3
Portugal (AFP)	5
Puerto Rico (Monitor Latino)	8
Romania (Airplay 100)	77
Russia Airplay (TopHit)	3
San Marino (SMRRTV Top 50)	3
Scottish Singles Sales (Official Charts)	1
Singapore (RIAS)	1
Slovakia Airplay (ČNS IFPI)	10
Slovakia Singles Digital (ČNS IFPI)	4
South Korea (Gaon)	122
Spain (PROMUSICAE)	8
Sweden (Sverigetopplistan)	8
Switzerland (Schweizer Hitparade)	5
Ukraine Airplay (TopHit)	43
UK Singles (Official Charts)	1
Uruguay (Monitor Latino)	10
US Billboard Hot 100	1
US Adult Contemporary (Billboard)	11
US Adult Pop Airplay (Billboard)	3
US Hot Dance/Electronic Songs (Billboard)	1
US Pop Airplay (Billboard)	10
US Rolling Stone Top 100	1
Venezuela (Record Report)	31

Weekly chart performance
Chart (2021)	Peak position
US Hot Dance/Electronic Songs (Billboard)	23

=== Monthly charts ===
Monthly chart performance
Chart (2020)	Peak position
Brazil Streaming (Pro-Música Brasil)	16
Paraguay (SGP)	20
Russia Airplay (Tophit)	9
Slovenia (SloTop50)	1
Ukraine Airplay (Tophit)	72

=== Year-end charts ===
2020 year-end chart performance for "Rain on Me"
Chart (2020)	Position
Argentina Airplay (Monitor Latino)	45
Australia (ARIA)	35
Austria (Ö3 Austria Top 40)	73
Belgium (Ultratop Flanders)	30
Belgium (Ultratop Wallonia)	60
Bolivia (Monitor Latino)	46
Canada (Canadian Hot 100)	27
CIS (Tophit)	99
Costa Rica (Monitor Latino)	80
Croatia (HRT)	26
El Salvador (Monitor Latino)	64
France (SNEP)	193
Germany (Official German Charts)	99
Hungary (Dance Top 40)	98
Hungary (Rádiós Top 40)	44
Hungary (Single Top 40)	28
Hungary (Stream Top 40)	42
Ireland (IRMA)	20
Italy (FIMI)	79
Japan (Japan Hot 100)	96
Japan Hot Overseas (Billboard)	4
Mexico Airplay (Monitor Latino)	48
Netherlands (Dutch Top 40)	36
Netherlands (Single Top 100)	62
Paraguay (Monitor Latino)	44
Poland (ZPAV)	98
Portugal (AFP)	108
Russia Airplay (Tophit)	116
Slovenia (SloTop50)	11
Switzerland (Schweizer Hitparade)	63
UK Singles (Official Charts)	17
US Billboard Hot 100	48
US Adult Contemporary (Billboard)	22
US Adult Pop Airplay (Billboard)	10
US Hot Dance/Electronic Songs (Billboard)	3
US Pop Airplay (Billboard)	40
US Radio Songs (Billboard)	51

2021 year-end chart performance for "Rain on Me"
Chart (2021)	Position
Global 200 (Billboard)	123
Hungary (Rádiós Top 40)	86
UK Singles (Official Charts)	99
US Adult Contemporary (Billboard)	27
US Hot Dance/Electronic Songs (Billboard)	7

== Certifications and sales ==
Certifications and sales
Region	Certification	Certified units/sales
Australia (ARIA)	5× Platinum	350,000^{‡}
Austria (IFPI Austria)	Platinum	30,000^{‡}
Belgium (BRMA)	Platinum	40,000^{‡}
Brazil (Pro-Música Brasil)	3× Diamond	480,000^{‡}
Canada (Music Canada)	6× Platinum	480,000^{‡}
Denmark (IFPI Danmark)	Platinum	90,000^{‡}
France (SNEP)	Platinum	200,000^{‡}
Germany (BVMI)	Gold	200,000^{‡}
Hungary (MAHASZ)	Gold	2,000^{‡}
Italy (FIMI)	Platinum	70,000^{‡}
New Zealand (RMNZ)	3× Platinum	90,000^{‡}
Norway (IFPI Norway)	2× Platinum	120,000^{‡}
Poland (ZPAV)	3× Platinum	150,000^{‡}
Portugal (AFP)	Platinum	10,000^{‡}
Spain (Promusicae)	2× Platinum	120,000^{‡}
United Kingdom (BPI)	3× Platinum	1,800,000^{‡}
United States (RIAA)	2× Platinum	2,000,000^{‡}
Streaming
Japan (RIAJ)	Platinum	100,000,000^{†}
Sweden (GLF)	Platinum	8,000,000^{†}
^{‡} Sales+streaming figures based on certification alone.^{†} Streaming-only figures based on certification alone.

== Release history ==
Release dates and formats
Region	Date	Format(s)	Version	Label	Ref.
Various	May 22, 2020	7-inch single; cassette; CD; digital download; picture disc; streaming	Original	Interscope	
Various	May 22, 2020	Digital download	Instrumental	Interscope	
United States	May 25, 2020	Adult contemporary radio; hot adult contemporary radio; modern adult contemporary radio	Original	Interscope	
United States	May 26, 2020	Contemporary hit radio	Original	Interscope	
Italy	June 5, 2020	Radio airplay	Original	Universal	
Various	July 17, 2020	Digital download; streaming	Purple Disco Machine remix	Interscope	
Various	July 17, 2020	Digital download; streaming	Ralphi Rosario remix	Interscope	

== See also ==
- List of Billboard Hot 100 number-one singles of 2020
- List of Billboard number-one dance songs of 2020
- List of Billboard Digital Song Sales number ones of 2020
- List of Billboard Hot 100 chart achievements and milestones
- List of Canadian Hot 100 number-one singles of 2020
- List of UK Singles Chart number ones of the 2020s
- List of UK Singles Downloads Chart number ones of the 2020s
- List of UK top-ten singles in 2020
- List of number one singles in Scotland (2020)
- List of number-one singles of 2020 (Ireland)
- List of number-one songs of 2020 (Singapore)
- List of airplay number-one hits in Argentina
