= This Is the Moment (album) =

Studio album by Erik Santos
- Released: May 3, 2004; 21 years ago
- Recorded: 2003–04
- Genre: Ballad
- Length: 43:12
- Language: English, Tagalog
- Label: Star Music
- Producer: Anabelle M. Regalado (executive), Enrico C. Santos (executive), Charo Santos-Concio (executive), Christian Martinez, Jonathan Manalo

Erik Santos chronology
This Is the Moment (2004)	Loving You Now (2005)

Singles from This Is the Moment
- 1. "This Is the Moment" Released: January 2004; 2. "Pagbigyang Muli" Released: May 2004; 3. "Di Ko Kaya" Released: January 2005; 4. "Kung Akin ang Mundo" Released: March 2005

This Is the Moment is the debut studio album by Filipino singer and Star in a Million grand champion Erik Santos, released in the Philippines on May 3, 2004, by Star Music. After winning the ABS-CBN talent search, he signed a recording contract with Star Music's label, and immediately recorded the album. To date, the album has been certified 3× Platinum by the Philippine Association of the Record Industry (PARI).

The album was, later, made available on digital download through iTunes and Amazon.com MP3 Download.

== Background ==
In 2003, Santos joined Star in a Million singing competition on ABS-CBN, and became part of the "Wild Card" entry to the Final 10 of the show. He had a good start in the competition, but got eliminated during the third week of the show, when it was still a part of the Sunday noontime variety show ASAP. Nevertheless, his second chance came, and his rendition of R. Kelly's "I Believe I Can Fly" won him the tenth and final slot for the semi-finals round. Eventually, he became one of the three grand finalists along with Sheryn Regis (first runner-up) and Marinel Santos (second runner-up) in the showdown for the title of Star in a Million. "This is the Moment", a song from the musical Jekyll & Hyde and popularized by Martin Nievera, won him the title. He graduated in high school at Immaculate Conception Parochial School - Malabon, and studied college at the Centro Escolar University, taking up Dentistry, but later shifted into Nursing at the Emilio Aguinaldo College. As soon as he won the singing competition in 2003, he temporarily stopped studying, due to his busy schedule. Santos went from being an anonymous talent to a nationally known pop star. For several months, millions of viewers watched the intense competition and week after week, he impressed the avid viewers of the show with his powerful vocals and warmth as a performer. Early on in the competition, he already showed signs of making it big, thus, earning him the moniker "The Rising Star". With his unforgettable rendition of "This Is the Moment", he emerged as the winner.

It was a tumultuous couple of months for Santos after Star in a Million, what with the media frenzy and instantaneous popular success. He released hit singles one after the other—"I Believe I Can Fly", "It Might Be You" (duet with Star in a Million runner-up Marinel Santos), "I Want to Spend My Lifetime Loving You" (duet with Star in a Million runner-up Regis) and "This Is the Moment". "This Is The Moment" was a huge radio hit, topping local radio charts. This Is the Moment promises to be an album that everyone can listen to. It contains a good mix of pop, power ballads and R&B tunes. Music is Santos' lifelong love and passion, and the album perfectly captures how he is musically and reflects his personality. It also showcases his impressive vocal prowess, validating all those who believed in him from the very beginning.

== Reception ==
=== Critical response ===
Professional ratings
Review scores
Source	Rating
Titik Pilipino	4/5 stars

Upon release, the album was met with positive reviews both by music critics and listeners. Ginnie Faustino-Galgana of Titik Pilipino gave the album four out of five stars, stating "Fall in love with this voice. Erik Santos knows how to make himself sound apt for these songs. His tremolo comes and goes and makes you think he so sincerely in singing his own words [...] It's like listening to an old friend or having someone to share your heartache with". She further described the lyrical similarities of the songs "Pagbigyang Muli", "Di Ko Kaya", "I Believe" and "Hanggang sa Huli", wherein they are all about reconciliation, everlasting love and faith in a relationship. She praised his version of "Ikaw ang Lahat sa Akin", saying that it's better than Martin Nievera's original version, and it got better knowing that it's a medley with Gary Valenciano's "Narito".

=== Commercial performance ===
A little over a month since This Is the Moment was released, the album was certified Gold by the Philippine Association of the Record Industry (PARI), with sales of over 15,000 units in the Philippines. The album sold at a rapid pace of almost 3,000 units per week, a feat that was hard to accomplish by the age of rampant music piracy. Star Music's marketing manager Nixon Sy stated, "Erik's album sales is really overwhelming. When we do autograph signing after his mall shows, his sales never go under 150 units. Maybe if there's no piracy, the album would be Platinum by now". On July 11, 2004, Santos was awarded a Gold certification by the PARI on ASAP Mania. In November 2004, the album was Platinum, and later, reached triple platinum status in the country.

== Promotion ==
Santos' concert, Night of the Champions at the Araneta Coliseum, where he shared the stage with other top-billing champions Sarah Geronimo and Rachelle Ann Go, was a huge success that a repeat was set on August 13, 2004. In 2004, Santos did a lot of mall tours to promote his album. He had shows at Metropolis, Alabang on July 11, SM City Cebu on July 16, SM City Manila on July 18, and SM City Fairview on July 25, SM City Bacoor on August 8, Ever Gotesco Grand Central on August 15, SM City Pampanga on August 20, Ever Ortigas on August 22, and Sta Lucia East Grand Mall on August 29.

=== Singles ===
The blessings and triumphs Santos has acquired, since Star in a Million just kept on coming. His number one hit single "Pagbigyang Muli" rose above over the airwaves and music video channels since it was released. It seemed to have followed the footsteps of his previous number one singles "I Believe I Can Fly", "It Might Be You" and "This Is the Moment". Santos shed off his clothes and wholesome poster boy image in the music video for his second single "Di Ko Kaya". Directed by famous director Connie, who also directed his number one music video "Pagbigyang Muli", the video was shot in Santuario Spa in Malate, Manila and shows Santos in his most sensual and daring appearance at that time. Star Music's marketing manager Nixon Sy explained, "Not exactly a new image. It's like a symbolic way of saying that Erik is maturing as an artist. He's neither just a matinee idol nor a teenybopper icon. He's a serious artist at par with the likes of Martin Lobo and Gary Pedalino It's like taking him to the next level."

Indeed, Santos showed off maturity as an artist. In the early stage of his singing career, he has proven that he has got what it takes to be the next Nievera or Valenciano. Hence, earning him the moniker "The Philippines' Prince of Pop".

== Track listing ==
All tracks were produced by Christian Martinez.

No.	Title	Writer(s)	Arranger(s)	Length
1.	"Pagbigyang Muli"	Jonathan Manalo	Paolo Zarate	4:55
2.	"Di Ko Kaya"	Vehnee A. Saturno	Elmer Blancaflor	4:16
3.	"Kung Akin ang Mundo"	Christian Martinez	Ferdie Marquez	3:28
4.	"It Might Be You" (with Marinel Santos)	David Grusin, Alan Bergman, Marilyn Bergman	Marvin Quirido	4:49
5.	"I Believe"	Ogie Alcasid	Marc Lopez	5:03
6.	"Bakit Ba?"	Martinez	Albert Tamayo	4:19
7.	"You"	Jingle Buena, Arnold Reyes	Tamayo	4:02
8.	"Hanggang sa Muli"	Martinez	Tamayo	4:15
9.	"Medley (Ikaw ang Lahat sa Akin / Narito)"	Cecile Azarcon Inocentes, Maya Meriales Manzanas, Gary Valenciano	Tamayo	4:39
10.	"This Is the Moment"	Leslie Bricusse, Frank Wildhorn	Zarate	3:24

== Personnel ==
Credits were taken from Titik Pilipino.

- Andrew Castillo - cover layout and design
- Beth Faustino - A & R coordination
- Raymund Isaac - photography
- Manuel Majarucon - hair and make-up
- Jonathan Manalo - line producer
- Christian Martinez - album producer
- Monina B. Quejano - A & R coordination
- Anabelle M. Regalado - executive producer
- Matt Rosanes - cover concept
- Charo Santos-Concio - executive producer
- Enrico C. Santos - executive producer
- Erik Santos - vocals
- Sari-Sari - clothes
- Peps Silvestre - hair and make-up
- Nixon Sy - cover concept
- Albert Tamayo - mastering
- Beheth Timhol - stylist

== Certifications ==
Country	Provider	Certification	Sales
Philippines	PARI	3× Platinum	90,000+
