= Karencitta =

Filipino singer (Cebuano)

- Born: Karen Ann Cabrera; October 5, 1995 (age 31); Sydney, Australia
- Occupations: Singer; songwriter; actress
- Years active: 2017–present
- Spouse: Darrell S. Caballero (m. 2021)

Karen Ann Cabrera (born October 5, 1995), professionally known as Karencitta, is a Filipino singer, songwriter and actress from Cebu. She gained prominence with her viral hit "Cebuana" in 2017.

== Early life and education ==
Karencitta was born in Sydney, Australia, to Filipino parents who worked as caregivers. In 2000, her family moved to Lorega, Cebu City, where she was raised. She was separated from her parents for over a decade during her childhood. She attended the CIE British School in Cebu before relocating to the United States, where she lived in various parts of Los Angeles, including Torrance and Carson. In Los Angeles, she pursued higher education and was enrolled at Penn State University, working towards a doctorate degree.

== Career ==
=== Career beginnings ===
Karencitta's foray into the entertainment industry began with small acting roles in American television series such as Grey's Anatomy, How to Get Away with Murder, and Superstore. She also worked various jobs in Hollywood while honing her craft as a musician and performer . Her early musical influences include Michael Jackson, Bob Marley, Amy Winehouse, Beyoncé, Kendrick Lamar, and XXXTentacion, which shaped her eclectic style blending pop, hip-hop, and R&B.

=== Breakthrough with "Cebuana" ===
In 2017, Karencitta released "Cebuana," a song that became an instant hit, garnering over a million views on YouTube within 24 hours. The track, which features a mix of English and Cebuano lyrics, pays homage to her roots and the Sinulog Festival. Produced in collaboration with Austrian producer Tc-5 and Grammy Award-winning producer Jon Ingoldsby, "Cebuana" topped Spotify Philippines' Viral 50 chart and earned her the Best Regional Recording award at the 2018 Awit Awards.

== Personal life ==
Karencitta is married to Darrell S. Caballero, with whom she collaborates on various philanthropic projects through their foundation.

== Filmography ==
=== Television ===
Year	Title	Role	Notes	Source
2014	How to Get Away with Murder	Law Student		
2014	Grey's Anatomy			
2015	Superstore	Actress		

=== Film ===
Year	Title	Role	Notes	Source
2019	Indak	KC	Supporting role	

== Discography ==
=== Studio albums ===
Title	Details
Cebuana Persuasion	Released: 2018; Format: CD; Label: Viva
CITTA	Released: 2025; Format: Digital Download; Label: Lorega Amo Records

=== Singles ===
==== As lead artist ====
List of singles as featured artist, with selected chart positions and certifications, showing year released and album name
Title	Year	Sales	Certifications	Album
"Nobody Else"	2016			
"SXMSTR"	2017			
"Special" (featuring Just Hush)	2017			
"Fckroun"	2017			
"Cebuana"	2017			Cebuana Persuasion
"No Apology (Wala Akong Paki)"	2017			Cebuana Persuasion; Revirginized: Official Soundtrack
"Luvburn"				
"1Love" (featuring Amaan Ali Bangash and Ayaan Ali Bangash)	2018			
"BamBamBam"	2017			Cebuana Persuasion
"No Apologies"	2019			
"IDK"	2019			
"Rain"	2020			
"Do It in Bisaya" (with Cookie$ & Anon)	2020			
"Good Night" (featuring Donny Pangilinan)	2020			
"Pilipina" (featuring Cookie$)	2020			
"Michael Jordan Era"	2020			
"Gorillaz"	2021			
"V!B!N" (featuring DJ Loonyo)	2021			
"Anoona" (featuring Nik Makino & Cursebox)	2021			
"BOOM!"	2023			
"6ENSE"	2023			
"F.U.I.L.Y (featuring Pricetagg)	2023			
"Jusko" (featuring Skusta Clee)	2024			
"Welcome to Cebu" (featuring King Spade)	2025			
"Feeva" (with felhony)	2026			

== Awards and nominations ==
Year	Work	Award	Category	Result	Source
2018	"Cebuana"	Myx Music Awards 2018	Music Video of the Year (Note: Shared with Paul Martin.)	Nominated	
2018	"Cebuana"	Myx Music Awards 2018	New Artist of the Year	Nominated	
2018	"Cebuana"	Cebu Siloy Music Awards	Best Song of the Year	Won	
2018	"Cebuana"	Cebu Siloy Music Awards	Best Vocal Performance — Female	Won	
2018	"Cebuana"	Awit Awards	Best Regional Recording	Won	
2019	"No Apologies"	Cebu Siloy Music Awards	Best Regional Recording	Nominated	
