= Myx Music Awards 2011 =

Annual Philippine music awards ceremony

- Date: March 15, 2011
- Location: Music Museum, Greenhills Shopping Center, San Juan
- Country: Philippines
- Hosted by: Myx video jockeys
- Most awards: Yeng Constantino
- Most nominations: Yeng Constantino

Television/radio coverage
- Network: Myx
- Produced by: Myx

Myx Music Awards 2011 was the 6th Myx Music Awards, an annual music awards ceremony established in 2006. Hosted by various Myx video jockeys, it was broadcast on Myx. It was the first edition of the awards to include the Favorite K-Pop Video category. Yeng Constantino was the ceremony's biggest winner, receiving six awards from seven nominations, including Favorite Artist, Favorite Female Artist, Favorite Myx Celebrity VJ, Favorite Music Video for "Jeepney Love Story", and Favorite Collaboration for "Kung Wala Na Nga" with 6cyclemind and Kean Cipriano.

== Hosts ==
- Bianca Roque
- Chino Lui-Pio
- Iya Villania
- Janine Ramirez
- Luis Manzano
- Nikki Gil
- Robin Nievera

== Winners and nominees ==
Winners are listed first and highlighted in boldface.

| Favorite Music Video | Favorite Song |
|---|---|
| **"Jeepney Love Story" – Yeng Constantino**; "Disney" – Tanya Markova; "Kung Wala Na Nga" – 6Cyclemind feat. Kean Cipriano and Yeng Constantino; "Lakad" – Sandwich; "Liwanag" – Callalily | **"Jeepney Love Story" – Yeng Constantino**; "Cariño Brutal" – Slapshock; "Disney" – Tanya Markova; "Kung Wala Na Nga" – 6Cyclemind feat. Kean Cipriano and Yeng Constantino; "Pakiusap Lang" – Parokya ni Edgar |
| Favorite Artist | Favorite Female Artist |
| **Yeng Constantino**; Callalily; Christian Bautista; Parokya ni Edgar; Sandwich | **Yeng Constantino**; Juris; KC Concepcion; Kyla; Sarah Geronimo |
| Favorite Male Artist | Favorite Group |
| **Gloc-9**; Billy Crawford; Christian Bautista; Piolo Pascual; Rico Blanco | **Parokya ni Edgar**; 6Cyclemind; Callalily; Sandwich; Slapshock |
| Favorite Mellow Video | Favorite Rock Video |
| **"I Remember the Girl" – Christian Bautista**; "Di Lang Ikaw" – Juris; "Not Like the Movies" – KC Concepcion; "Sino Nga Ba S’ya" – Sarah Geronimo; "You Don’t Know" – Regine Velasquez | **"Lakad" – Sandwich**; "A Call to Arms" – Urbandub; "Alay" – Kamikazee; "Neon Lights" – Rico Blanco; "What’s Your Poison" – Chicosci |
| Favorite Urban Video | Favorite New Artist |
| **"Back to Love" – Quest**; "Can’t Get Enough" – Young JV; "Fly with Me" – Duncan; "I Want You Back" – Krazykyle feat. Luke Mejares; "Watchin’ Me" – Hi-C | **Tanya Markova**; Franco; General Luna; Kiss Jane; Quest |
| Favorite Indie Artist | Favorite Collaboration |
| **Mr. Bones and The Boneyard Cirus**; Gaijin; Mr. Bones; Slex; Techy Romantics; Turbo Goth | **"Kung Wala Na Nga" – 6Cyclemind feat. Kean Cipriano and Yeng Constantino**; "Martilyo" – Gloc-9 feat. Letter Day Story; "Please Be Careful with My Heart" – Christian Bautista and Sarah Geronimo; "Simulan Na Natin" – Kenyo feat. Hi-C; "You’ve Got a Friend" – Billy Crawford and Nikki Gil |
| Favorite Remake | Favorite Media Soundtrack |
| **"Beautiful Girl" – Christian Bautista**; "Himala" – Jay-R; "Kung Wala Ka" – Nikki Gil; "Too Much Love Will Kill You" – Jovit Baldivino; "Yakap" – Ogie Alcasid | **"Kaya Mo" – Protein Shake feat. Ney Dimaculangan and Kean Cipriano (RPG Metanoia)**; "In Your Eyes" – Rachelle Ann Go (In Your Eyes); "Kung Tayo’y Magkakalayo" – Gary Valenciano (Kung Tayo’y Magkakalayo); "Love Will Keep Us Together" – Sarah Geronimo (Hating Kapatid); "Miss You Like Crazy" – Erik Santos (Miss You Like Crazy) |
| Favorite Guest Appearance in a Music Video | Favorite Myx Celebrity VJ |
| **Angel Locsin ("Magkaibang Mundo" – Hale)**; Anne Curtis ("Breathe Again" – Chicosci); Dingdong Dantes and Marian Rivera ("You Don’t Know" – Regine Velasquez); Piolo Pascual ("Jeepney Love Story" – Yeng Constantino); Richard Gutierrez ("Today I’ll See the Sun" – Frencheska Farr) | **Yeng Constantino**; Aljur Abrenica; Empress; Parokya ni Edgar; Sam Milby |
| Favorite Myx Live! Performance | Favorite International Video |
| **Slapshock**; Neocolours; Noel Cabangon; Tanya Markova; The CompanY | **"Just the Way You Are" – Bruno Mars**; "Baby" – Justin Bieber feat. Ludacris; "Love the Way You Lie" – Eminem feat. Rihanna; "Pyramid" – Charice feat. Iyaz; "Telephone" – Lady Gaga feat. Beyoncé |
| Favorite K-Pop Video | Myx Magna Award Special Citation |
| **"Go Away" – 2NE1**; "Beautiful" – Beast; "Bingeul Bingeul" – U-KISS; "Bonamana" – Super Junior; "Run Devil Run" – Girls’ Generation | **Regine Velasquez-Alcasid** |
