= Myx Music Awards 2021 =

Annual Philippine music awards ceremony

Myx Awards 2021
- Date: August 7, 2021
- Country: Philippines
- Hosted by: Myx VJs

Highlights
- Most awards: SB19 (4)
- Most nominations: Ben&Ben (5)
- Website: myx.global/myxawards

Television/radio coverage
- Network: Myx

Myx Awards 2021 is the 16th installment of the Myx Music Awards, acknowledging the biggest hit makers of 2020 in the Philippine music industry. The awards were held virtually for the second time (since 2020) due to the ongoing coronavirus pandemic.

Nominees were announced on June 19, 2021 through the music channel's digital accounts on Kumu, Twitter, Facebook, TikTok, and YouTube livestream. Ben&Ben led the nominees with five nominations, Moira Dela Torre with four, and SB19 with three. For the tenth consecutive year, fans are voting online through the Myx website. Apart from online voting, fans can also vote through Kumu and Twitter. Voting ended on July 18.

== Winners and nominees ==
Winners are listed first and highlighted in boldface.

Myx Magna Award (special award)	Music Video of the Year
**Asin**	**"Alab" – SB19 (Director: Julienne Gueco)**; "Ang Pinagmulan" – IV of Spades (Directors: Raymond Dacones and Trina Razon); "River" – MNL48 (Director: Miko Pelino); "Sa Susunod Na Habang Buhay" – Ben&Ben (Director: Jorel Lising); "White Rabbit" – Nadine Lustre ft. Massiah (Director: Dominic Bekaert)
Song of the Year	Artist of the Year
**"Alab" – SB19**; "Catriona" – Matthaios; "Lifetime" – Ben&Ben; "Marikit" – Juan and Kyle; "Paubaya" – Moira Dela Torre	**SB19**; Ben&Ben; MNL48; Moira Dela Torre; Nadine Lustre
New Artist of the Year	Mellow Video of the Year
**Matthaios**; Maine Mendoza; Michael Dutchi Libranda; Michael Pacquiao; Miguel Odron	**"Sa Susunod Na Habang Buhay" – Ben&Ben (Director: Jorel Lising)**; "Balang Araw" – Iñigo Pascual (Director: Iñigo Pascual); "Patawad" – Moira Dela Torre (Director: Niq Ablao); "Safe Place" – Kiana V (Director: Saint); "Sasagipin Kita" – Darren Espanto (Director: Jiggy Gregorio)
Rock Video of the Year	R&B/Hip-Hop Video of the Year
**"Lakas" – COLN ft. Dale Jairus (Director: Vladimer Castañeto)**; "Ang Pinagmulan" – IV of Spades (Directors: Raymond Dacones and Trina Razon); "Dila" – Zild (Director: Daniel Aguilar); "Kalawakan" – Juan Karlos (Director: Rod Tumbaga); "Pahirapan" – Mayonnaise ft. I Belong To The Zoo (Director: Juancho Pancho)	**"Love" – Michael Pacquiao (Directors: Edrex Clyde Sanchez and Nick Hernandez)**; "Kulog" – Assembly Generals (Director: Assembly Generals); "Muddy Waters" – Delinquent Society (Director: Murphy Caballero); "Night Code" – Manila Grey (Director: Matt Dennison); "Teknik" – Shanti Dope ft. Buddah (Director: JC Echanes)
Collaboration of the Year	International Video of the Year
**"Paalam" – Moira Dela Torre and Ben&Ben**; "Isang Gabi" – Julie Anne San Jose and Rico Blanco; "Pati Pato (Parokya Remix)" – Parokya ni Edgar, Gloc-9 and Shanti Dope; "Sampaguita" – Juan Karlos and Gloc-9; "Sana Tayo Na" – Darren Espanto and Jayda	**"Dynamite" – BTS**; "Cardigan" – Taylor Swift; "Rain On Me" – Lady Gaga and Ariana Grande; "Watermelon Sugar" – Harry Styles; "Yummy" – Justin Bieber
Kumu Streamer of the Year	Kumu Audience Choice
**Jex De Castro**; Christian Bahaya; Mark Michael Garcia; Dani Ozaraga; Sofronio Vasquez III	**SB19**
Global Achievement of the Year	Special Achievement Award
**Olivia Rodrigo**	**"Wildest Dreams" – Nadine Lustre**

== Multiple awards ==
=== Artists with multiple wins ===
The following artists received two or more awards:

Wins	Artists
4	SB19
2	Ben&Ben

=== Artists with multiple nominations ===
The following artists received more than two nominations:

Nominations	Artists
5	Ben&Ben
4	Moira Dela Torre
3	SB19
