= Myx Music Awards 2006 =

Annual Philippine music awards ceremony

- Date: June 6, 2006
- Location: Onstage Greenbelt, Makati
- Most wins: Cueshe

Television/radio coverage
- Network: MYX

The 1st Myx Music Awards was held on June 6, 2006, at Onstage Greenbelt, Makati.

== Nominees ==
Winners are in bold text.

=== Favorite Music Video ===
- "The Day You Said Goodnight" by Hale
- "Mang Jose" by Parokya Ni Edgar
- **"You'll Be Safe Here" by Rivermaya**
- "Gemini" by Spongecola
- "Hari Ng Sablay" by Sugarfree

=== Favorite Song ===
- "Hallelujah" by Bamboo
- **"Stay" by Cueshé**
- "The Day You Said Goodnight" by Hale
- "Pinoy Ako" by Orange and Lemons
- "Gemini" Sponge Cola

=== Favorite Artist ===
- Bamboo
- **Cueshé**
- Hale
- MYMP
- Nina

=== Favorite Male Artist ===
- Ogie Alcasid
- Christian Bautista
- Mark Bautista
- Jay R
- **Erik Santos**

=== Favorite Female Artist ===
- Barbie Almalbis
- Sarah Geronimo
- **Rachelle Ann Go**
- Kitchie Nadal
- Nina

=== Favorite Group ===
- Bamboo
- **Cueshé**
- Hale
- MYMP
- Orange and Lemons

=== Favorite Collaboration ===
- "Koro" by Greyhoundz feat. Francis Magalona and Gloc9
- "Say That You Love Me" by Jay R and Kyla
- **"Burn" by Nina and Christian Bautista**
- "Sweet" by South Border and Jinky Vidal
- "High" by The Speaks and Barbie Almalbis

=== Favorite Remake ===
- **"I Need You" by Mark Bautista**
- "Maling Akala" by Brownman Revival
- "I Wanna Know What Love Is" by Sarah Geronimo
- "Tell Me Where It Hurts" by MYMP
- "Love Moves in Mysterious Ways" by Nina

=== Favorite Rock Video ===
- "Hallelujah" by Bamboo
- "Mang Jose" by Parokya Ni Edgar
- **"KLSP" by Sponge Cola**
- "Hari Ng Sablay" by Sugarfree
- "Alert The Armory" by Urbandub

=== Favorite Mellow Video ===
- "Hello" by Ogie Alcasid
- "Love Can't Lie" by Sarah Geronimo
- **"From The Start" by Rachelle Ann Go**
- "I Know" by Yasmien Kurdi
- "I Will Never Leave You" by Erik Santos

=== Favorite Urban Video ===
- "Stay Real" by April
- **"Tula" by Gloc9**
- "Just The Way You Are" by Jay R
- "Tingnan Mo" by Pikaso
- "Sweet" by South Border and Jinky Vidal

=== Favorite Indie Artist ===
- Imago
- Radioactive Sago Project
- **Sandwich**
- Shiela and the Insects
- Twisted Halo

=== Favorite New Artist ===
- Brownman Revival
- Cueshé
- Hale
- **Pupil**
- Sponge Cola

=== Favorite MYX Live Performance ===
- Bamboo
- Brownman Revival
- **MYMP**
- Parokya Ni Edgar
- Raymond Lauchengco

=== Favorite International Music Video ===
- "We Belong Together" by Mariah Carey
- "My Humps" by The Black Eyed Peas
- **"Don't Cha" by The Pussycat Dolls**
- "Incomplete" by Backstreet Boys
- "Wake Me Up When September Ends" by Green Day

=== Favorite Media Soundtrack ===
- "Just A Smile" by Barbie Almalbis (Close-up)
- "Pinoy Ako" by Orange and Lemons (Pinoy Big Brother)
- "First Day Funk" by Parokya Ni Edgar (Rexona)
- **"You'll Be Safe Here" by Rivermaya (Spirits)**
- "Makita Kang Muli" by Sugarfree (Panday)

=== Favorite Guest Appearance in a Music Video ===
- Uma Khouny for "What I Do Best" by Sheryn Regis
- Kris Aquino for "Hello" by Ogie Alcasid
- Joel Torre for "Hari Ng Sablay" by Sugarfree
- **Anne Curtis for "I Need You" by Mark Bautista**
- Precious Lara Quigaman for "Everything You Do by Christian Bautista

== Special awards ==
=== Myx Magna Award ===
- Sharon Cuneta
