= Myx Music Awards 2008 =

Annual Philippine music awards ceremony

- Date: March 26, 2008
- Location: Meralco Theater, Pasig, Philippines

Television/radio coverage
- Network: MYX

The following is a list of winners in the 2008 MYX Music Awards, held at the Meralco Theater, Ortigas Center.

== List of nominees and winners ==
Winners are in bold text

=== Favorite Music Video ===
- "Probinsyana" by Bamboo
- "Magbalik" by Callalily
- "Chicosci Vampire Social Club" by Chicosci
- "Sundo" by Imago
- **"Tuliro" by Sponge Cola**

=== Favorite Song ===
- "Magsasaya" by 6cyclemind
- "Chicosci Vampire Social Club" by Chicosci
- **"Ikaw" by Sarah Geronimo**
- "Ikaw Lamang" by Silent Sanctuary
- "Wag Ka Nang Umiyak" by Sugarfree

=== Favorite Artist ===
- 6cyclemind
- Callalily
- **Imago**
- Chicosci
- Sponge Cola

=== Favorite Male Artist ===
- Christian Bautista
- **Erik Santos**
- Gloc-9
- Janno Gibbs
- Piolo Pascual

=== Favorite Female Artist ===
- Jaya
- Kyla
- Rachelle Ann Go
- **Sarah Geronimo**
- Toni Gonzaga

=== Favorite Group ===
- 6cyclemind
- Bamboo
- Callalily
- Chicosci
- **Sponge Cola**

=== Favorite Collaboration ===
- **"Pag-ibig Na Kaya" by Rachelle Ann Go & Christian Bautista**
- "Lando" by Gloc9 & Francis M.
- "Salawikain" by Mcoy & The Spaceflower Show
- "Paano Kita Iibigin" by Regine Velasquez & Piolo Pascual
- "Inosente Lang Ang Nagtataka" by Rivermaya feat. Raimund Marasigan

=== Favorite Remake ===
- "Tatsulok " by Bamboo
- "Mahirap Magmahal Ng Syota Ng Iba" by Hilera
- "Is It Over" by Jaya
- **"Love Will Lead You Back" by Kyla**
- "Ale" by The Bloomfields

=== Favorite Rock Video ===
- "Tatsulok" by Bamboo
- **"Chicosci Vampire Social Club" by Chicosci**
- "Seksi Seksi" by Kamikazee
- "Will You Ever Learn" by Typecast
- "Guillotine" by Urbandub

=== Favorite Mellow Video ===
- "Is It Over" by Jaya
- "Love Will Lead You Back" by Kyla
- "Only Reminds Me Of You" by MYMP
- **"Alam Ng Ating Mga Puso" by Rachelle Ann Go**
- "Catch Me I'm Falling" by Toni Gonzaga

=== Favorite Urban Video ===
- "Summertime" by 7 Shots of Wisdom
- "Back Into You" by Amber Davis
- "Ikaw (Humanap Ka Ng Pangit Part 2)" by Andrew E.
- **"Like That" by Billy Crawford**
- "Lando" - Gloc9 & Francis M.

=== Favorite Indie Artist ===
- Ciudad
- Felepinas
- Kjwan
- Radioactive Sago Project
- **"Up Dharma Down**

=== Favorite New Artist ===
- Julianne
- Lala
- **Sam Concepcion**
- Silent Sanctuary
- Chicosci

=== Favorite MYX Live Performance ===
- Gloc9
- Jed Madela
- **Pupil**
- Regine Velasquez & Piolo Pascual
- Sugarfree

=== Favorite International Music Video ===
- "Girlfriend" by Avril Lavigne
- **"Teenagers" by My Chemical Romance**
- "Your Guardian Angel" by The Red Jumpsuit Apparatus
- "Umbrella" by Rihanna
- "Jenny" by The Click Five

=== Favorite Media Soundtrack ===
- "Para Sa 'yo" by Aiza Seguerra (Ysabella)
- "Argos" by Bamboo (Rounin)
- "Sana Maulit Muli" by Gary Valenciano (Sana Maulit Muli)
- "Gotta Go My Own Way" by Nikki Gil (High School Musical 2)
- **"Tuloy Pa Rin" by Sponge Cola (Pedro Penduko at ang mga Engkantao)**

=== Favorite Guest Appearance in a Music Video ===
- Alfred Vargas ("All This Time" by Rufa Mae Quinto)
- Bangs Garcia ("Movie " by Sponge Cola)
- Jake Cuenca & Roxanne Guinoo ("Haplos" by Shamrock)
- Kaye Abad ("Director's Cut" by Kamikazee)
- **Kim Chiu & Gerald Anderson ("Love Team" by Itchyworms)**

=== Favorite MYX Celebrity VJ ===
- Judy Ann Santos
- Kjwan
- Parokya Ni Edgar
- Rufa Mae Quinto
- **Sarah Geronimo**

=== Favorite MYX Bandarito Performance ===
- Bagetsafonik
- Duster
- Reklamo
- Quadro
- **Zelle**

=== Favorite Ringtone ===
- **"Catch Me I'm Falling" by Toni Gonzaga**

=== MYX Magna Award ===
- **Gary Valenciano**
