= Myx Music Awards 2014 =

Annual Philippine music awards ceremony

- Date: March 26, 2014
- Location: Samsung Hall, Taguig
- Country: Philippines
- Hosted by: Myx video jockeys

Highlights
- Most wins: Gloc-9 and Rico Blanco (4)
- Most nominations: Gloc-9 (7)
- Website: www.myxph.com/myxmusicawards/

Television/radio coverage
- Network: Myx
- Produced by: Myx

Myx Music Awards 2014 was the 9th Myx Music Awards, an annual music awards ceremony established in 2006. The awards ceremony was held on March 26, 2014. Gloc-9 led the nominations with seven nominations. His song "Magda", a collaboration with Rico Blanco, won four awards, making them the ceremony's most-awarded artists. As with the 2012 and 2013 ceremonies, fans could vote for the nominees online through the Myx website and its official Facebook and Twitter accounts.

== Hosts ==
- Chino Lui Pio
- Nikki Gil

== Winners and nominees ==
Winners are in bold text.

Favorite Music Video	Favorite Song
**"Magda" – Gloc-9 featuring Rico Blanco** (Director: J. Pacena II); "Chinito" – Yeng Constantino (Director: Avid Liongoren); "HKM" – Callalily (Director: Treb Monteras II); "Ikot-Ikot" – Sarah Geronimo (Directors: Paul Basinillo and Sarah Geronimo); "Ilusyon" – Abra featuring Arci Muñoz (Director: Raymond "Abra" Abracosa)	**"Magda" – Gloc-9 featuring Rico Blanco**; "Buko" – Jireh Lim; "Chinito" – Yeng Constantino; "Ikot-Ikot" – Sarah Geronimo; "Nasa Iyo Na Ang Lahat" – Daniel Padilla
Favorite Artist	Favorite Female Artist
**Sarah Geronimo**; Jireh Lim; Daniel Padilla; Gloc-9; Yeng Constantino	**Yeng Constantino**; Jonalyn Viray; KZ Tandingan; Sarah Geronimo; Zia Quizon
Favorite Male Artist	Favorite Group
**Bamboo**; Abra; Daniel Padilla; Gloc-9; Sam Concepcion	**Parokya ni Edgar**; Banda ni Kleggy; Callalily; Chicosci; Sponge Cola
Favorite Mellow Video	Favorite Rock Video
**"Magkabilang Mundo" – Jireh Lim** (Director: Joyce Bernal); "Help Me Get Over" – Jonalyn Viray (Director: Cesar Apolinario); "Luna" – Up Dharma Down (Director: Nic Reyes and Pong Ignacio); "Pansamantala" – Callalily (Director: Kean Cipriano); "Take a Chance" – Luigi D'Avola (Director: Enzo Valdez)	**"Carousel" – Bamboo** (Director: Marla Ancheta); "Better Days" – Franco (Director: Martin Rey Aviles); "Insekto" – Pedicab (Director: RA Rivera); "Pick Your Poison" – Sponge Cola (Director: Jerico Catalan); "Raspberry:Girl" – Chicosci (Director: RA Rivera)
Favorite Urban Video	Favorite New Artist
**"Magda" – Gloc-9 featuring Rico Blanco** (Director: J. Pacena II); "Hagdan" – Ron Henley featuring Kat Agarrado (Director: Patrick Edward Raymundo); "Ilusyon" – Abra featuring Arci Muñoz (Director: Marla Ancheta); "Saludo" – Quest (Director: James Muleta); "Tonight" – Jay R and Mica Javier (Director: Romson Niega)	**KZ Tandingan**; Banda ni Kleggy; Jireh Lim; Luigi D'Avola; Marion Aunor
Favorite Collaboration	Favorite Remake
**"Magda" – Gloc-9 featuring Rico Blanco**; "Ang Bagong Ako" – Greyhoundz featuring Loonie and Biboy Garcia; "Ang Parokya" – Parokya ni Edgar featuring Gloc-9 and Frank Magalona; "Darating" – BBS featuring Ney, Dello and Kleggy; "Dati" – Sam Concepcion, Tippy Dos Santos and Quest	**"It Takes a Man and a Woman" – Sarah Geronimo** (original: Teri DeSario); "Dreaming of You" – Juris (original: Selena); "Forever" – Tom Rodriguez and Dennis Trillo (original: Passage); "Mahal na Mahal" – Sam Concepcion (original: Archie D.); "Right Next to Me" – Kimpoy Feliciano (original: Whistle)
Favorite Media Soundtrack	Favorite Guest Appearance in a Music Video
**"Carousel" – Bamboo** (from Globe Tattoo commercial); "Got to Believe" – Juris (from Got to Believe); "Help Me Get Over" – Jonalyn Viray (from My Husband's Lover); "It Takes a Man and a Woman" – Sarah Geronimo (from It Takes a Man and a Woman); "Kaleidoscope World Forever More" – Elmo Magalona featuring Francis M. (from Oishi Endorser)	**Kim Chiu – "Discolamon" by Banda ni Kleggy**; Enchong Dee – "Chinito" by Yeng Constantino; Enrique Gil – "Mr. Kupido" by Myrtle Sarrosa; John Lloyd Cruz – "It Takes a Man and a Woman" by Sarah Geronimo; Kathryn Bernardo – "Nasa Iyo Na Ang Lahat" by Daniel Padilla
Favorite Myx Celebrity VJ	Favorite International Video
**Abra**; Alden Richards; apl.de.ap; Barbie Forteza; Carla Abellana	**"Roar" – Katy Perry** (Director: Mackie Galvez); "Best Song Ever" – One Direction; "Heart Attack" – Demi Lovato; "Royals" – Lorde; "Wrecking Ball" – Miley Cyrus
Favorite K-Pop Video	Myx Magna Award
**"Wolf" – Exo**; "Everybody" – Shinee; "Gentleman" – Psy; "I Got a Boy" – Girls' Generation; "I'm Sorry" – CNBLUE	**Parokya ni Edgar**
