= Kaibigan Mo =

Single by Sarah Geronimo featuring Yeng Constantino

from the album The Great Unknown
- Released: February 3, 2017
- Recorded: 2015
- Genre: Pop
- Length: 4:10
- Label: Viva Records
- Songwriter: Yeng Constantino
- Producers: Civ Fontanilla; Thyro Alfaro

Music video
- "Kaibigan Mo" on YouTube

Kaibigan Mo (English: Your Friend) is the third single from Sarah Geronimo's platinum album The Great Unknown, released on February 3, 2017. It was recorded the by Geronimo and Yeng Constantino, the latter wrote the song. This song is the most-streamed track from The Great Unknown album with over 9.7 Million plays on Spotify as of August 29, 2017. Geronimo and Constantino performed the song together for the first time at the 2017 edition of FUSION Music Festival on January 27, 2017.

== Music video ==
Viva Records released the music video of the song on February 3, 2017. The music video features both Geronimo and Constantino. It reached #1 on both MTV Pinoy and Myx.

== Live performances ==
Sarah Geronimo and Yeng Constantino performed the song on FUSION Music Festival on January 27, 2017. They also sung the song on ASAP on March 12, 2017. Singer Hanna Flores took over Constantino's part on the hit song for Geronimo's The Great Unknown: Unplugged album show on Kia Theater in November 2016, Flores also join Geronimo for the rest of her The Great Unknown provincial shows to sing the song.

In 2026, Constantino premiered a live performance featuring songs she had written for other artists, including Sarah Geronimo, Erik Santos, and Kyla. Among the songs performed was "Kaibigan Mo", which was originally released on February 3, 2017.

== Chart performance ==
Chart (2017)	Peak position
Philippine Billboard (Top 20)	16
Philippines (Myx Hit Chart)	1
Philippines Radio 90.7 Love Radio (Weekly Top 10 Chart)	5
Philippines Radio 92.3 Calatagan Radio Republic Batangas (Daily Top 6)	6
Philippines (Myx Daily Top 10)	1
Philippines Radio Pinas FM 95.5 (Pinoy Song Hits Year End Countdown Chart)	7
Philippines Radio 99.7 Core FM (Top 20 Countdown Chart)	5
Philippines Radio 99.1 Wild FM (Weekly Top 10 Chart)	8

The song reached number one on both the MTV Pinoy and Myx charts. It also landed on the first ever Billboard PH Top 20, charting at No. 18 and peaking at No. 16.
