= Erik Santos =

Filipino singer (born 1982)

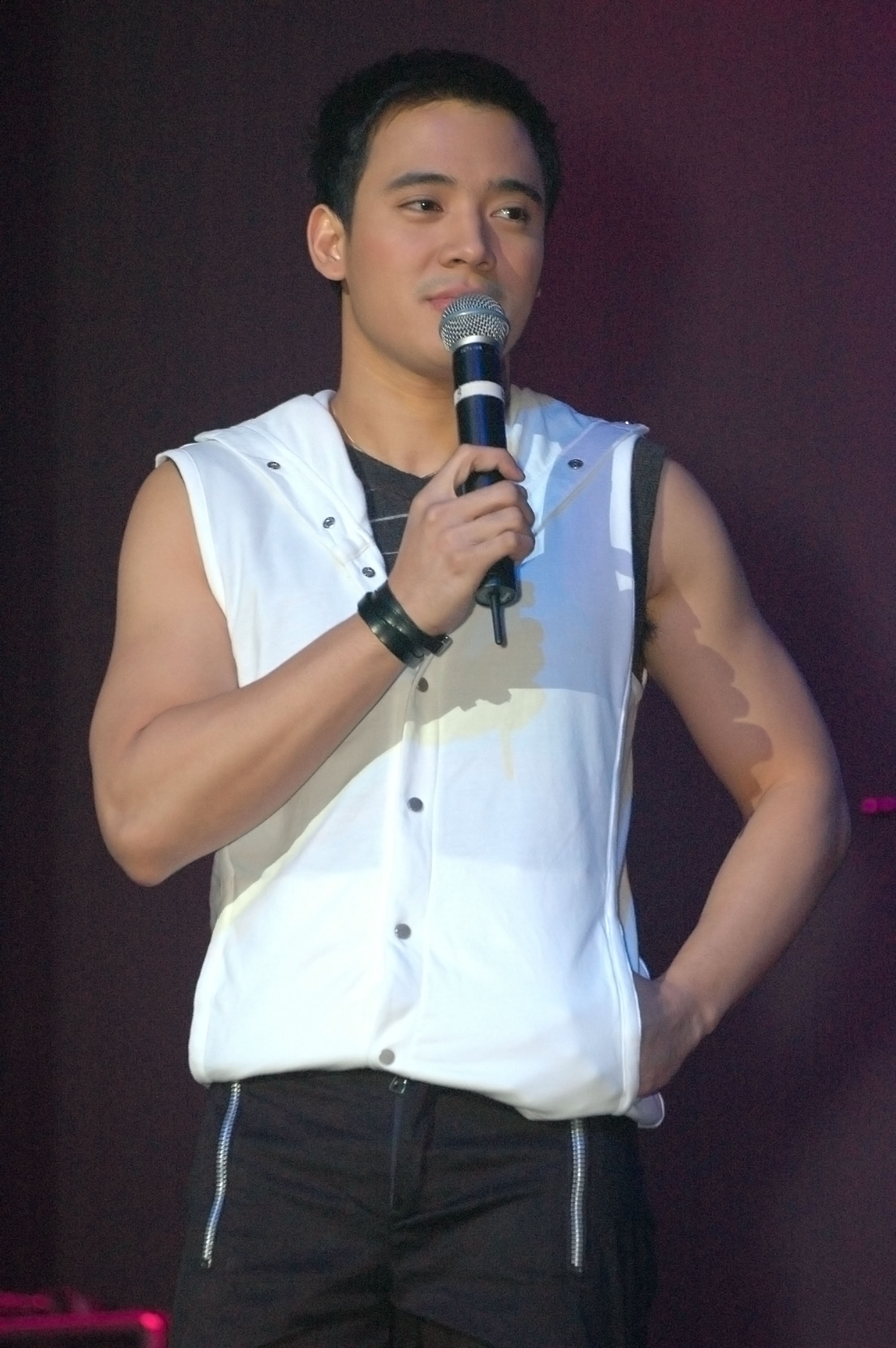
- Santos during a Chicago concert, 2008
- Born: Rhoderick Ramos Santos; October 10, 1982 (age 43); Malabon, Metro Manila, Philippines
- Occupation: Singer
- Years active: 2004–present
- Agents: Backroom Inc. (2003–2011); Cornerstone Talent Management Center (present)
- Musical career
- Genres: OPM; pop; R&B; adult contemporary
- Instruments: vocals; piano
- Labels: Star Music (2004–present); Star Magic (2011–present)

Rhoderick "Erik" Ramos Santos (born October 10, 1982) is a Filipino singer. He rose to prominence after winning the reality talent competition Star in a Million in 2003. He has been referred to as the “King of Pinoy Teleserye Theme Songs.” His debut album, This Is the Moment, was released in 2004 and went triple platinum.

His passion for music started during his childhood years. He participated in various singing competitions. His best-selling albums, sold-out concerts and a demand for corporate shows, accolades from Awit Awards, Star Awards and Aliw Awards, endorsements for a bank (Bank of the Philippine Island's Express Remit), theme songs for radio stations, and even movies earned him an unusual popularity. His first single, "Pagbigyang Muli", remained number one on WRR's hit chart for more than 20 weeks together with his other songs filling up the chart simultaneously.

== Early and personal life ==
Rhoderick Ramos Santos was born on October 10, 1982, in Malabon, Metro Manila, Philippines to Renato Aquino Santos (born November 12, 1952) and Angelita Ramos Santos. Both battled lung cancer and died on November 25, 2022, and August 11, 2023, respectively. When he was four, his passion for singing started. He participated in numerous small-town singing competitions.

Rufa Mae Quinto, the original Booba, was Santos' girlfriend until their breakup in 2007.

He studied at the Centro Escolar University and took up dentistry, but later shifted to Psychology. As soon as he won the singing competition Star in a Million in 2003, he temporarily stopped studying, because of his busy schedule. Eventually, he came back to school and finished college. He graduated in March 2010.

Santos was in a relationship with Angeline Quinto from 2013 to 2016.

=== Star in a Million ===
In 2003, Santos joined Star in a Million singing contest, and became part of the wildcard entry to the Final 10 of the show. He had a good start in the competition, but got eliminated during the third week of the show, when it was still a part of the Sunday noontime variety show ASAP. Nevertheless, his second chance came, and his rendition of R. Kelly's "I Believe I Can Fly", won him the tenth and final slot for the semi-finals round. Eventually he became one of the three grand finalists along with Sheryn Regis (first runner up) and Marinel Santos (2nd runner up) in the showdown for the title of Star in a Million. "This is the Moment", a song from the musical Jekyll & Hyde, popularized by Martin Nievera, won him the title.

He is a third cousin of Kapuso actor Wendell Ramos. He is also the brother of newbie Star Magic actress Hadiyah Santos.

== Career ==
In 2004, Santos released his debut album This is the Moment, and it went platinum after three months of its release. After his debut, he released an extended play, quickly followed by his second album, Loving You Now. The album was released with the hit single "Bakit Ba Iniibig Ka", composed by Ogie Alcasid, and sung as a duet with Asia's Songbird Regine Velasquez. In December 2005, he held his first major solo concert at the Marikina Riverbanks. On October 19, 2007, he staged another major concert at the Araneta Coliseum, entitled Erik Santos ... Solo at the Coliseum, with Sam Milby, The company, Nyoy Volante, Danita Paner, and Ai-Ai de las Alas as guests. On September 22, 2018, he held his 15th anniversary concert titled Er1k 5antos: My Greatest Moments at the Mall of Asia Arena.

== Discography ==
=== Studio albums ===
- 2004 Star in a Million (Double Platinum)
- 2004 Star in a Million (Repackaged)
- 2004 This Is The Moment – first major solo album (Triple Platinum)
- 2005 I'll Never Go (CD-lite) (Platinum)
- 2005 Loving You Now (Platinum)
- 2006 Your Love (Gold)
- 2007 Your Love (Limited Platinum Edition) (Platinum)
- 2007 All I Want This Christmas (Gold)
- 2008 Face-Off (compilation of hits, with Christian Bautista)
- 2009 The Jim Brickman Songbook (Platinum)
- 2010 All I Want This Christmas (Repackaged)
- 2011 Awit Para Sa'Yo (Gold)
- 2013 The Erik Santos Collection (Gold)

=== Compilation albums ===
- Love Life (Boy Abunda)
- May Bukas Pa Tambayan Album
- I-Star 15 OPM No. 1s
- Himig Handog P-Pop Love Songs

=== EP ===
- I'll Never Go EP (2005)
- All I Want This Christmas (2007)

2× Platinum

== Filmography ==
=== Television ===
| Year | Title | Role | Notes |
|---|---|---|---|
| 2004–present | ASAP | Host/Performer | |
| 2010 | Maalaala Mo Kaya | Clifford | Episode "Bus" |
| 2010 | Star Power | Host | |
| 2011 | Star Power: Search for the Next Male Singing Heartthrob | Host | |
| 2013 | Maalaala Mo Kaya | Young Roque | Episode "Puntod" |
| 2015 | Your Face Sounds Familiar (season 2) | Guest | |
| 2016–present | It's Showtime | Judge in Tawag ng Tanghalan | |
| 2016–present | Maalaala Mo Kaya | RJ | Episode "May Forever" |
| 2025–2026 | Your Face Sounds Familiar (season 4) | Himself/Guest Judge | |

=== Film ===
| Year | Title | Role | Notes |
|---|---|---|---|
| 2009 | Kimmy Dora | Waiter | Feature film, cameo |
| 2011 | Catch Me, I'm in Love | Himself | Feature film, cameo (in final sequence) |
| 2012 | Kimmy Dora and the Temple of Kiyeme | Cameo | |
| 2014 | S6parados | | 1st indie movie |

== Concerts ==
=== Headlining ===
Local

- 2004, Night of the Champions Araneta Coliseum

with Sarah Geronimo, Rachelle Ann Go, Mark Bautista and Christian Bautista

- 2004, The Prince of Pop and The Comedy Araneta Colieseum

Concert Queen Two Solos, 1 concert

- 2007, Pamaskong Handog ni Erik Santos Marikina Riverbanks
- 2008, OL4LUV Araneta Coliseum

with Sarah Geronimo, Christian Bautista, Rachelle Ann Go

- 2007, SOLO Araneta Coliseum first major solo concert

2009, Pop Icons Araneta Coliseum with Christian Bautista, Piolo Pascual, Sam Milby and Mark Bautista

- 2010, Heartsongs Teatrino

Two-Nights; Valentine Concert

- 2010, Power of One Meralco Theater

Two-Nights;Solo Concert

- 2010, Extra Ordinary Songs Aliw Theater

with Sitti

- 2011, PowER IKons Music Museum

Two Nights; Solo Concert

- 2012, Greatest Themesongs Meralco Theater

Two Nights; Solo Concert

- 2018, Er1k 5antos: My Greatest Moments SM Mall of Asia Arena

Two Nights; International

- Canada Tour with Toni Gonzaga
- The Prince of Pop and The Ultimate Performer (US Tour with Vina Morales)
- Queens on Fire with Regine Velasquez and Pops Fernandez (ULTRA)
- Queens on Fire US Tour
- Champion Philippine and US tour
- The Prince of Pop US Tour
- Champions of the Heart Europe Tour
- Christmas Is @ Marikina Riverbanks
- Casino Filipino Shows
- PAGCOR Shows
- Center For Pop Events

== Awards and nominations ==
| Year | Award giving body | Category | Nominated work | Results |
|---|---|---|---|---|
| 2004 | 18th PMPC Star Awards for TV | Best New Male TV Personality | ASAP | Won |
| 2004 | 17th Aliw Awards | Best New Male Artist | This Is The Moment | Won |
| 2004 | 17th Aliw Awards | Best Performance by a New Male Recording Artist | This Is The Moment | Won |
| 2004 | 24th People's Choice Award | Most Promising Balladeer | This Is The Moment | Won |
| 2004 | Outlook Magazine | Top 10 Most Influential Youth | —N/a | Included |
| 2004 | Dangal Ng Malabon | Gintong Parangal for the Performing Arts | —N/a | Won |
| 2004 | Chalk Magazine | Top 50 Philippine Heartthrobs | —N/a | Included |
| 2005 | 18th Aliw Awards | Best Major Concert(shared with Christian Bautista, Mark Bautista, Rachelle Ann Go and Sarah Geronimo) | Night of the Champions | Won |
| 2005 | 2nd ASAP Platinum Circle Awards | Platinum Male Artist | This is the Moment (Double Platinum) | Included |
| 2006 | IFM Pinoy Music Awards | Best Performance by a Male Recording Artist | Loving You Now | Won |
| 2006 | ASAP Awards | Top 10 OPM Ballad | I'll Never Go | Included |
| 2006 | Homeboy No. 1 Awards | Favorite Singer | —N/a | Won |
| 2006 | MYX Music Awards | Favorite Male Artist | I'll Never Go | Won |
| 2006 | MYX Music Awards | Favorite Mellow Video | I Will Never Leave You | Nominated |
| 2006 | 3rd ASAP Platinum Circle Awards | Platinum Male Artist | Loving You Now | Included |
| 2006 | 1st ASAP Pop Viewers Choice Awards | Pop Male Artist | Your Love | Won |
| 2006 | 1st ASAP Pop Viewers Choice Awards | Pop Male Performance | Bakit ba Iniibig Ka? | Won |
| 2006 | Yes! Magazine Readers' Choice Awards | Celebrity Home of the Year | —N/a | Won |
| 2007 | Pinoy Music Chart Awards | Artist of the Year | —N/a | Won |
| 2007 | MYX Music Awards | Favorite Male Artist | —N/a | Won |
| 2007 | MYX Music Awards | Favorite Collaboration(shared with Regine Velasquez) | Bakit Ba Iniibig Ka? | Won |
| 2007 | MYX Music Awards | Favorite Remake | Your Love | Won |
| 2007 | 20th Aliw Awards | Best Male Performance in a Concert | —N/a | Won |
| 2007 | iFM Pinoy Music Awards | Most Popular Song by a Male Performer | Your Love | Won |
| 2008 | 3rd Myx Music Awards | Favorite Male Artist | —N/a | Won |
| 2008 | Catholic Mass Media Awards | Best Music Video | "Balik Sa Bayan" | Won |
| 2008 | 21st Awit Awards | Best Christmas Song | "Ngayong Pasko" | Nominated |
| 2008 | 3rd ASAP Pop Viewers' Choice Awards | Pop Male Performance | Here I Am | Won |
| 2008 | 3rd ASAP Pop Viewers' Choice Awards | Pop Male Artist | Face Off (Compilations hits with Christian Bautista) | Won |
| 2009 | 4th Myx Music Awards | Favorite Male Artist | Face Off (Compilations hits with Christian Bautista) | Won |
| 2009 | WAKI OPM Music Awards | Listener's Choice (Male) | —N/a | Won |
| 2009 | 1st Malabon Music Festival | Malabon Musicians Alliance Awardee | —N/a | Won |
| 2009 | 22nd Awit Awards | Best Inspirational/Religious Recording (shared with Christian Bautista) | Never Give Up | Won |
| 2009 | 3rd ASAP 24K Gold Awards | Golden Voice Awardee(Male) | Erik Santos: The Jim Brickman Songbook | Included |
| 2010 | 2nd PMPC Star Awards for Music | Male Pop Artist of the Year | Erik Santos: The Jim Brickman Songbook | Won |
| 2010 | 2nd PMPC Star Awards for Music | Pop Male Recording Artist of the Year | Erik Santos: The Jim Brickman Songbook | Won |
| 2010 | 2nd PMPC Star Awards for Music | Pop Album of the Year | Erik Santos: The Jim Brickman Songbook | Won |
| 2010 | 5th ASAP Pop Viewers' Choice Awards | Pop Song | My Love Is Here | Won |
| 2010 | 5th ASAP Pop Viewers' Choice Awards | Pop Movie Theme Song | Miss You Like Crazy (from the movie Miss You like Crazy) | Won |
| 2011 | 59th FAMAS Awards | Best Theme Song | Miss You Like Crazy (from the movie Miss You like Crazy) | Won |
| 2011 | 6th Myx Music Awards | Favorite Media Soundtrack | Miss You Like Crazy (from the movie Miss You like Crazy) | Nominated |
| 2011 | 6th ASAP Pop Viewers' Choice Awards | Pop Music Video | "Bakit Mahal Pa Rin Kita" | Won |
| 2011 | 24th Awit Awards | Best Christmas Song | "Christmas (A Time to Love)" | Nominated |
| 2012 | 4th PMPC Star Awards for Music | Song of the Year | "Kulang Ako Kung Wala Ka" | Won |
| 2012 | 25th Awit Awards | Best Male Recording Artist | "Sapagkat ang Diyos ay Pag-ibig" | Nominated |
| 2012 | 25th Awit Awards | Best Inspirational/Religious Recording | "Sapagkat ang Diyos ay Pag-ibig" | Nominated |
| 2013 | 8th Myx Music Awards | Favorite Mellow Video | "Bakit Mahal Pa Rin Kita" | Nominated |
