= Myx Music Awards 2009 =

Annual Philippine music awards ceremony

- Date: February 26, 2009
- Location: Meralco Theater, Pasig, Philippines

Television/radio coverage
- Network: MYX

The following is a list of winners in the 2009 MYX Music Awards, held at the Meralco Theater, Ortigas Center.

== List of nominees and winners ==
Sarah Geronimo is the big winner with a total of 6 awards.

Winners are in bold text

=== Favorite MYX Bandarito Performance ===
- **Astrojuan**
- Coffee Break Island
- Delara
- Kinky Hooters
- Nyctinasty

=== Favorite MYX Live Performance ===
- Aiza Seguerra
- Chicosci
- **Imago**
- Richard Poon
- Sandwich

=== Favorite International Music Video ===
- "7 Things" – Miley Cyrus
- **"Crush" – David Archuleta**
- "Decode" – Paramore
- "When You Look Me in the Eyes" – Jonas Brothers
- "Womanizer" – Britney Spears

=== Favorite MYX Celebrity VJ ===
- KC Concepcion
- Kim Chiu & Gerald Anderson
- Sam Concepcion
- **Sarah Geronimo**
- Vhong Navarro

=== Favorite Media Soundtrack ===
- "Ang Sarap Dito" – Project 1 (Coca-Cola)
- **"A Very Special Love" – Sarah Geronimo (A Very Special Love)**
- "Ikaw Ang Pangarap" – Martin Nievera (Lobo)
- "Kung Fu Fighting" – Sam Concepcion (Kung Fu Panda)
- "This Is Me" – Julianne & Miguel Escueta (Camp Rock)

=== Favorite Remake ===
- **"A Very Special Love" – Sarah Geronimo**
- "Macho" – Parokya Ni Edgar
- "Message In A Bottle" – The Dawn
- "Payong" – Miss Ganda
- "Princesa" – Itchyworms

=== Favorite Collaboration ===
- **"Captured" – Christian Bautista & Sitti**
- "This Is Me" – Julianne & Miguel Escueta
- "Egis Erp" – Lourd de Veyra & Raymund Marasigan
- "Ang Sarap Dito" – Project 1
- "I’ll Be There" – Sarah Geronimo & Howie Dorough

=== Favorite Guest Appearance In A Music Video ===
- Bembol Roco ("Boogie Mo" – Bembol Rockers)
- Billy Crawford ("If You’re Not The One" – Nikki Gil)
- Glaiza de Castro ("Disconnection Notice" – Pupil)
- **Karylle ("Only Hope" – Gary Valenciano)**
- Marian Rivera ("Kung Sakali" – Ogie Alcasid)

=== Favorite Indie Artist ===
- Angulo
- Drip
- Out Of Body Special
- **Paraluman**
- Reklamo

=== Favorite New Artist ===
- Charice
- KC Concepcion
- Nancy Jane
- **Rico Blanco**
- Taken by Cars

=== Favorite Mellow Video ===
- **"A Very Special Love" – Sarah Geronimo**
- "Kung Sakali" – Ogie Alcasid
- "Now" – MYMP
- "Tell Me That You Love Me" – Regine Velasquez
- "The One Who Won My Heart" – Christian Bautista

=== Favorite Rock Video ===
- **"Ang Pusa Mo" – Pedicab**
- "Disconnection Notice" – Pupil
- "Procrastinator" – Sandwich
- "The Fight Is Over" – Urbandub
- "Yugto" – Rico Blanco

=== Favorite Urban Video ===
- "Eargasmic" – Dice & K9 Mobbstarr
- "K.I.T.T.Y." – Kitty Girls
- "Make ‘Em Say" – Pikaso
- "Pambansang Kamao" – Dcoy feat. Artsrong, E.S.P. & Nathan J.
- **"Shake That Thing" – Dannie Boi feat. Beatmox**

=== Favorite Group ===
- **6cyclemind**
- Callalily
- Pupil
- Sandwich
- Sponge Cola

=== Favorite Male Artist ===
- Christian Bautista
- **Erik Santos**
- Ogie Alcasid
- Richard Poon
- Rico Blanco

=== Favorite Female Artist ===
- Kyla
- Rachelle Ann Go
- Regine Velasquez
- **Sarah Geronimo**
- Yeng Constantino

=== Favorite Artist ===
- Callalily
- Rico Blanco
- Sandwich
- **Sarah Geronimo**
- Sponge Cola

=== Favorite Song ===
- **"Betamax" – Sandwich**
- "Kailan" – Bamboo
- "Pasubali" – Sponge Cola
- "Pitong Araw" – Hale
- "Yugto" – Rico Blanco

=== Favorite Music Video ===
- "Ang Pusa Mo" – Pedicab (Directed by RA Rivera)
- "Ang Sarap Dito" – Project 1 (Directed by Marie Jamora)
- "Disconnection Notice" – Pupil (Directed by Quark Henares)
- **"Procrastinator" – Sandwich (Directed by Quark Henares)**
- "The Fight Is Over" – Urbandub (Directed by Treb Monteras II

=== MYX Magna Award ===
- Eraserheads

=== Special Citation Award ===
- Charice
- Arnel Pineda
