= Myx Music Awards =

Philippine TV music station awards

- Current: Myx Music Awards 2024
- Logo used until 2021
- Awarded for: Outstanding achievements in the music industry.
- Country: Philippines
- Presented by: Myx
- First award: June 6, 2006; 20 years ago
- Website: Myx Awards

The Myx Music Awards, currently known as the Myx Awards, are accolades presented by the cable channel Myx to honor the biggest hitmakers in the Philippines. The awards ceremony is held annually and occurs most commonly in March, and broadcast delayed on Myx. Myx viewers from all over the Philippines decide the winners in 17 major categories via SMS text messaging by 2010 it is 60% fan votes through internet and 40% artists votes.

Sarah Geronimo has the most wins in the history of the award ceremony.

== Ceremonies ==
Edition	Date	City	Venue	Host(s)
1st	June 6, 2006	Makati	OnStage Theatre, Greenbelt	N/A
2nd	March 15, 2007	Quezon City	AFP Theater	N/A
3rd	March 26, 2008	Pasig	Meralco Theater	Myx VJs
4th	February 26, 2009	Pasig	Meralco Theater	Myx VJs
5th	March 2, 2010	San Juan	Music Museum, Greenhills Shopping Center	Myx VJs
6th	March 15, 2011	San Juan	Music Museum, Greenhills Shopping Center	Myx VJs
7th	March 13, 2012	San Juan	Music Museum, Greenhills Shopping Center	Myx VJs
8th	March 20, 2013	San Juan	Music Museum, Greenhills Shopping Center	Myx VJs
9th	March 26, 2014	Taguig	Samsung Hall, SM Aura Premier	Myx VJs
10th	March 25, 2015	Taguig	Samsung Hall, SM Aura Premier	Myx VJs
11th	March 15, 2016	Quezon City	Kia Theater	Myx VJs
12th	March 16, 2017	Quezon City	Kia Theater	Myx VJs
13th	May 15, 2018	Quezon City	Smart Araneta Coliseum	Myx VJs
14th	May 15, 2019	Quezon City	ABS-CBN Vertis Tent	Myx VJs
15th	July 25, 2020	No venue; virtually held due to COVID-19 pandemic		Myx VJs
16th	August 7, 2021	No venue; virtually held due to COVID-19 pandemic		Myx VJs
No ceremony was held in 2022 (Note: They organized the 35th Awit Awards instead.) and 2023
17th	November 21, 2024	Quezon City	ABS-CBN Broadcasting Center	Myx VJs

== Award categories ==
=== Competitive awards ===
- Myx Music Award for Favorite Music Video (since 2006)
- Myx Music Award for Favorite Song (since 2006)
- Myx Music Award for Favorite Artist (since 2006)
- Myx Music Award for Favorite New Artist (since 2006)
- Myx Music Award for Favorite Rock Video (since 2006)
- Myx Music Award for Favorite Urban Video (since 2006)
- Myx Music Award for Favorite Mellow Video (since 2006)
- Myx Music Award for Favorite Collaboration (since 2006)
- Myx Music Award for Favorite International Video (since 2006)

==== Retired awards ====
- Myx Music Award for Favorite Indie Artist (2006–2011)
- Myx Music Award for Favorite Myx Live Performance (2006–2013)
- Myx Music Award for Favorite K-Pop Video (2011–2015)
- Myx Music Award for Favorite Remake (2006–2019)
- Myx Music Award for Favorite Male Artist (2006–2019)
- Myx Music Award for Favorite Female Artist (2006–2019)
- Myx Music Award for Favorite Group (2006–2019)
- Myx Music Award for Favorite Media Soundtrack (2006–2019)
- Myx Music Award for Favorite Guest Appearance in a Music Video (2006–2019)
- Myx Music Award for Favorite Myx Bandarito Performance (2006–2010; 2018–2019)
- Myx Music Award for Favorite MYX Celebrity VJ (2007–2020)

=== Special awards ===
- Myx Music Award for Myx Magna Award (since 2006)
- Myx Global Impact (2024)
- Kumu Rising Star of the Year (2021)
- Myx Music Award for Best Music Video (2016–2017)
- Spotify's Top OPM Hip-Hop Artist (2020)
- Myx Music Award for Favorite Ringtone (2006–2008)
- Special Citation

== Most awarded artist ==
Sarah Geronimo and Parokya Ni Edgar share the record for most awards won in a single night with six each, in 2009 and 2012 respectively. Overall, Sarah Geronimo is the most awarded nominee in MYX history since the show's inception in 2006. Bold text indicates most number of awards that year.

Artist	Awards	Years won
Sarah Geronimo	28	**4 (2008)**, **6 (2009)**, **4 (2010)**, 1 (2012), 2 (2013), 2 (2014), **4 (2015)**, **3 (2017)**, 2 (2018)
Gloc-9	19	1 (2006), 2 (2010), 1 (2011), 3 (2012), **3 (2013)**, **4 (2014)**, 2 (2015), 2 (2017), 1 (2024)
Nadine Lustre	15	1 (2015), **5 (2016)**, 2 (2017), 1 (2018), **4 (2019)**, 1 (2020), 1 (2021)
Sponge Cola	10	1 (2006), **4 (2007)**, 3 (2008), 1 (2010), 1 (2012)
Christian Bautista	10	1 (2006), 3 (2007), 1 (2008), 1 (2009), 1 (2010), 2 (2011), 1 (2013)
Yeng Constantino	10	**5 (2011)**, 1 (2012), 1 (2013), 1 (2014), 1 (2016), 1 (2018)
James Reid	10	1 (2015), 1 (2016), 1 (2017), **4 (2018)**, 1 (2019), 2 (2020)
Parokya Ni Edgar	9	1 (2011), **6 (2012)**, 2 (2014)
SB19	9	**3 (2020)**, **4 (2021)**, **2 (2024)**
Rico Blanco	8	1 (2009), 2 (2010), **4 (2014)**, 1 (2017)
Darren Espanto	8	1 (2015), 2 (2016), 2 (2017), 1 (2018), 2 (2019)
Erik Santos	6	1 (2006), 3 (2007), 1 (2008), 1 (2009)
Kyla	6	1 (2008), 2 (2010), 1 (2013), 2 (2016)
Moira Dela Torre	6	1 (2018), 2 (2019), 2 (2020), 1 (2021)
Rachelle Ann Go	5	2 (2006), 1 (2007), 2 (2008)
Sandwich	5	1 (2006), 2 (2009), 2 (2011)
Abra	5	2 (2013), 1 (2014), 2 (2016)
Daniel Padilla	5	1 (2013), 2 (2015), 2 (2020)
IV of Spades	5	2 (2018), 2 (2019), 1 (2020)
Kamikazee	4	1 (2007), 1 (2012), 1 (2013), 1 (2015)
Julie Anne San Jose	4	**3 (2013)**, 1 (2015)
Bamboo	4	3 (2014), 1 (2016)
Cueshé	3	**3 (2006)**
Chicosci	3	1 (2008), 1 (2010), 1 (2012)
6cyclemind	3	1 (2009), 1 (2010), 1 (2011)
Taylor Swift	3	1 (2010), 1 (2014), 1 (2015)
KZ Tandingan	3	1 (2014), 2 (2018)
BTS	3	1 (2019), 1 (2020), 1 (2021)

== Myx Magna Awardee ==
The Myx Magna Award is given annually to honor a music icon's exemplary contribution to the industry.

- 2006: Sharon Cuneta
- 2007: APO Hiking Society
- 2008: Gary Valenciano
- 2009: Eraserheads
- 2010: Jose Mari Chan
- 2011: Regine Velasquez
- 2012: Ryan Cayabyab
- 2013: Lea Salonga
- 2014: Parokya Ni Edgar
- 2015: Rey Valera
- 2016: Ogie Alcasid
- 2017: Vic del Rosario, Jr.
- 2018: Martin Nievera
- 2019: Rivermaya
- 2020: Francis Magalona (posthumous)
- 2021: Asin
- 2024: Gloc-9
