= Silent Sanctuary =

Filipino rock band

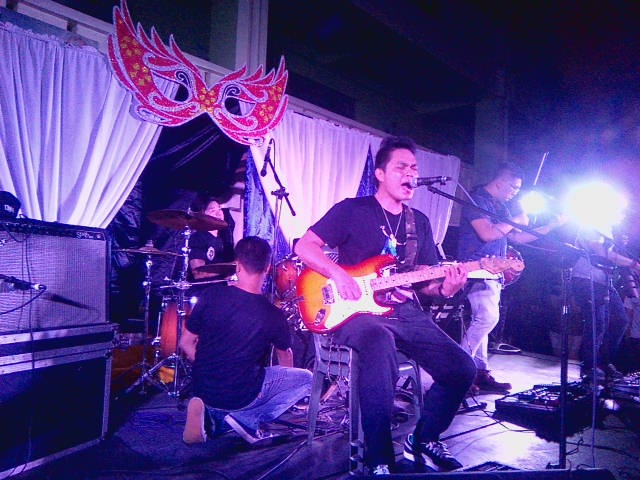
- Silent Sanctuary performing in Navotas in 2016

Background information
- Origin: Metro Manila, Philippines
- Genres: Alternative rock; pop rock; Pinoy rock
- Years active: 2001–present
- Labels: Universal Records; Ivory Music & Video; Ditto Music; Independent
- Members: Sarkie Sarangay; Anjo Inacay; Allen Calixto; Kim Mirandilla-Ng; Ronnie Ropal; Poch Villalon
- Past members: Jason Rondero; Chino David; Paolo Legaspi; Norman Dellosa; Jett Ramirez; Ian Carandang

Silent Sanctuary is a Filipino rock band that was formed in Metro Manila, Philippines in 2001. Five studio albums have been released by the band throughout its career.

== History ==
The band was formed in 2001 with Norman Dellosa (vocals, guitars), Paolo Legaspi (bass guitar, backing vocals), and Allen Calixto (drums). They experimented with their music by using classical instruments. To achieve this, they added Anjo Inacay (cellist), Dellosa's high school classmate, to the line-up.

In 2002, they guested in UnTV's In the Raw where Anjo asked Jett Ramirez to create string arrangements for their performance. They were joined by other string instrumentalists in the said episode. Later, Jett Ramirez (violist) and Chino David (violinist) were both asked as formal members of the band.

The name Silent Sanctuary was coined by Dellosa. In February 2004, they released an independently produced full-length album in Millennia Bar and Cafe in Kamuning entitled Ellipsis of the Mind. On the same year, Dellosa left the band.

Sarkie Sarangay succeeded Dellosa as the band's vocalist. Jett Ramirez left the band, after they released their debut single "Rebound" in 2006. Jason Rondero, vocalist/bassist of indie band New Modern became the band's new bassist when Paolo Legaspi left the band after their successful label debut album called Fuchsiang Pag-ibig, a year after Sarangay joined the band.

== Controversy ==
The band was scheduled to be a performer at the 2023 Pride PH Festival in Quezon City. However, the festival organizers and Quezon City Mayor Joy Belmonte made several announcements that the band was dropped from the line-up after its former vocalist Ian Carandang protested their inclusion. In a statement in his social media account, Carandang said that during his time with the band his bandmates made homophobic remarks against him and told him he "needed to go back into the closet if (he) wanted to keep being (the band's) vocalist".

== Band members ==
Current members

- Raymund "Sarkie" Sarangay – vocals, guitars (2004–present); keyboards (2013–2016)
- Anjo Inacay – cello (2001–present); backing vocals (2017–present)
- Allen Calixto – drums (2001–present)
- Kim Mirandilla-Ng – violin (2017–present)
- Ronnie Ropal – bass guitar (2020–present)
- Poch Villalon – synthesizers, backing vocals (2022–present)

Former members

- Jason Rondero – bass guitar, backing vocals (2008–2021)
- Chino David – violin, backing vocals (2001–2017)
- Paolo Legaspi – bass guitar, backing vocals (2001–2008)
- Norman Dellosa – vocals, guitars (2001–2004)
- Jett Ramirez – viola (2001–2006)
- Ian Carandang – vocals (2001)

== Discography ==
=== Albums ===
- Ellipsis of the Mind (2004)
- Fuchsiang Pag-ibig (2007)
- Mistaken for Granted (2009)
- Monodramatic (2013)
- Langit. Luha. (2015)
- Kami Na Po Muna Ulit! (Universal Records, 2007)
- Kisses Anniversary Album

=== Singles ===
- "Ikaw Lamang" (2007)
- "Hay Naku" (2009)
- "Bumalik Ka Na Sa'kin" (2013)

== Awards and nominations ==
Award ceremony	Year	Category	Nominee(s) / Work(s)	Result	Ref.
Awit Awards	2008	Best Christmas Recording	"Parol"	Nominated	
Awit Awards	2014	Best Ballad Recording	"Sa'Yo"	Nominated	
Awit Awards	2014	Best Collaboration	"Meron Nang Iba" with (Ashley Gosiengfiao)	Nominated	
Awit Awards	2014	Best Rock/Alternative Recording	"Bumalik Ka Na Sa'Kin"	Nominated	
Awit Awards	2014	Best Performance by a Group Recording Artist	"Bumalik Ka Na Sa'Kin"	Nominated	
Awit Awards	2014	Music Video of the Year	"Bumalik Ka Na Sa'Kin"	Nominated	
Awit Awards	2016	Best Performance by a Group Recording Artist	"Pasensiya Ka Na"	Nominated	
Awit Awards	2020	Best Performance by a Group Recording Artist	"Dahilan"	Nominated	
Awit Awards	2020	People's Voice Favorite Group Artist	"Dahilan"	Nominated	
MOR Pinoy Music Awards	2017	LSS Hit of the Year	"Pasensiya Ka Na"	Nominated	
MOR Pinoy Music Awards	2018	Group of the Year	"Silent Sanctuary"	Nominated	
Myx Music Awards	2008	Favorite New Artist	"Silent Sanctuary"	Nominated	
Myx Music Awards	2008	Favorite Song	"Ikaw Lamang"	Nominated	
Myx Music Awards	2015	Favorite Group	"Silent Sanctuary"	Won	
Myx Music Awards	2016	Favorite Group	"Silent Sanctuary"	Won	
Myx Music Awards	2017	Favorite Group	"Silent Sanctuary"	Nominated	
Myx Music Awards	2017	Mellow Video of the Year	"Di Na Kita Mahal"	Nominated	
Myx Music Awards	2018	Favorite Group	"Silent Sanctuary"	Nominated	
Myx Music Awards	2019	Collaboration of the Year	"Dambana" with (Aia De Leon)	Nominated	
NU Rock Award	2006	In The Raw Award	"Silent Sanctuary"	Won	
