= Bugoy: Decade =

2018 compilation album

Bugoy (Decade)

Compilation album by Bugoy Drilon
- Released: September 25, 2018
- Genre: Pop
- Length: 41:20
- Labels: ABS-CBN Film Productions, Inc.
- Producers: ABS-CBN Film Productions, Inc.

Bugoy Drilon chronology
Nang Dahil Sa Pag-ibig (2011)	Bugoy (Decade) (2018)	Anthems (2026)

Bugoy: Decade is a compilation album by Filipino singer Bugoy Drilon, released on September 25, 2018 through ABS-CBN Film Productions. Marking Drilon's tenth anniversary as a recording artist, the album draws together recordings from across his career, and its release coincided with his anniversary concert "Bugoy: One Day, One Decade" at the Kia Theatre in Cubao, Quezon City.

== Background ==
Drilon rose to prominence in 2008 as first runner-up on the reality singing competition Pinoy Dream Academy (Season 2). Over the following decade he released a series of albums for ABS-CBN, including Paano Na Kaya (2008), a self-titled album (2010), and Nang Dahil Sa Pag-Ibig (2011). By 2018, Drilon had also drawn wider attention for a viral cover of Matisyahu's "One Day", performed aboard the Wish 107.5 Bus in 2017, which led Matisyahu to invite him to share a stage during the American singer's Manila debut.

To mark ten years since his Pinoy Dream Academy debut, Drilon staged his first major solo concert, "Bugoy: One Day, One Decade", at the Kia Theatre, now New Frontier Theater, on September 25, 2018, the same date Bugoy: Decade was released.

== Composition ==
Rather than presenting a set of newly written material, Bugoy (Decade) compiles recordings from throughout Drilon's first ten years as a recording artist. At least five of its ten tracks had been released previously. "Paano Na Kaya" and "Muli" were both drawn from his 2008 debut album Paano Na Kaya. "Hindi Na Bale" originated from his 2010 self-titled album. "Huwag Ka Lang Mawawala", a duet with fellow Pinoy Dream Academy Season 2 scholar Liezel Garcia, had first appeared on the 2012 soundtrack to the film Walang Hanggan. "Air Tonight" had previously been issued as a stand-alone single in November 2017. The remaining tracks — "Namo", "Dito Na Lang", "Mahal Kita Ayaw Mo Na", "Kayumanggi", and "Pwede Bang Ako Na Lang Ulit" — complete the ten-song collection.

== Release ==
Bugoy: Decade was released on September 25, 2018 under ABS-CBN Film Productions. Its release coincided with "Bugoy: One Day, One Decade", Drilon's debut major solo concert, staged the same evening at the Kia Theatre. Produced by Wish 107.5 with backing from UNTV, Radyo La Verdad, Star Music, and Star Events, the anniversary show featured guest performers Yeng Constantino, KZ Tandingan, Klarisse De Guzman, Michael Pangilinan, and Daryl Ong, alongside fellow Pinoy Dream Academy Season 2 scholars Liezel Garcia, Cris Pastor, Hansen Nichols, and Miguel Mendoza.

== Track listing ==
No.	Title	Writer(s)	Length
1.	"Namo"	Christian D. Aballa	4:27
2.	"Dito Na Lang"	Ralph Maligro	4:02
3.	"Mahal Kita Ayaw Mo Na"	Bellie Grace N. Gomez, Allen John O. Castro	4:11
4.	"Air Tonight"	Lloyd Oliver Corpuz	3:17
5.	"Kayumanggi"	Ralph Maligro	4:23
6.	"Paano Na Kaya"	Ryan Cayabyab	4:16
7.	"Muli"	Freddie A. Saturno, Vehnee A. Saturno	4:08
8.	"Hindi Na Bale"	Jimmy Antiporda	4:09
9.	"Pwede Bang Ako Na Lang Ulit"	Jeffrey M. Cirfa	4:15
10.	"Huwag Ka Lang Mawawala" (feat. Liezel Garcia)	Ogie Alcasid	4:12
Total length:			41:20

== Personnel ==
- Bugoy Drilon – vocals
- Liezel Garcia – featured vocals (track 10)
- ABS-CBN Film Productions, Inc. – producer
