= PMPC Star Award for Song of the Year =

Annual Philippine music award

- Country: Philippines
- Presented by: PMPC
- First award: 2009
- Final award: 2026
- Currently held by: Maki – "Dilaw"

The PMPC Star Award for Song of the Year is one of the awards handed out at the yearly PMPC Star Awards for Music. The Song of the Year award is one of the most prestigious categories of the awards (alongside Album of the Year, Male Recording Artist of the Year, and Female Recording Artist of the Year). It was first awarded in 2009 and presented to Martin Nievera for their song "Ikaw ang Aking Pangarap".

Moira Dela Torre and SB19 are the only artists to win the award more than once.

== Recipients ==
Ed. (Year)	Winner(s)	Work	Nominees	Ref.
1st (2009)	Martin Nievera	"Ikaw ang Aking Pangarap"	Bugoy Drilon – "Paano na Kaya?"; Jolina Magdangal – "Hanggang Kailan"; MYMP – "Now"; Rico Blanco – " Your Universe"; Sarah Geronimo – "Ikaw"; Willie Revillame – "Ikaw Na Nga"	
2nd (2010)	Jericho Rosales	"Pusong Ligaw"	Callalily – "Nananaginip"; Juris – "Di Lang Ikaw"; Kenyo – "Hanggang sa Huli"; Yeng Constantino – "Lapit"	
3rd (2011)	Angeline Quinto	"Patuloy ang Pangarap"	Cesar Montano – "Darating ang Araw"; Gloc-9 – "Walang Natira"; Mark Alain – "Maghihintay"; Sarah Geronimo – "Sino Nga Ba Siya?"; Siakol – "Ituloy Mo Lang"; Toni Gonzaga – "Can't Help Myself"	
4th (2012)	Erik Santos	"Kulang Ako Kung Wala Ka"	Bamboo – "Questions"; Christian Bautista – "I'm Already King"; Jed Madela – "Breathe Again"; Juris – "Kahit 'Di Mo Sabihin"; Sam Milby – "Hindi Kita Iiwan"; Sponge Cola – "Tambay"	
5th (2013)	1:43	"Sa Isang Sulyap Mo"	Aiza Seguerra – "Anong Nangyari Sa Ating Dalawa"; Gloc-9 – "Sirena"; Callalily – "Pasasalamat"; Daniel Padilla – "Nasa 'Yo Na Ang Lahat"; Julie Anne San Jose – "Bakit Ngayon?"; Marvin Ong – "Ayoko Na"; Myrus – "Pusong Lito"	
6th (2014)	Jonalyn Viray	"Help Me Get Over"	Abra – "Gayuma"; Angeline Quinto – "Nag-iisa"; Bassilyo – "Lord, Patawad"; Gloc-9 – "Magda"; Kris Lawrence – "Ikaw Pala"; Sarah Geronimo – "Ikot"	
7th (2015)	Yeng Constantino	"Ikaw"	KZ Tandingan – "Mahal Ko O Mahal ako"; Morissette – "Akin Ka Na Lang"; Kim Chiu – "Mr. Right"; Michael Pangilinan – "Pare, Mahalo Ba Ako?"; Sheryl Cruz – "Mananatili"	
8th (2016)	Alden Richards	"Wish I May"	Bailey May – "Gusto Kita"; Darren Espanto – "Home"; Jona – "Naghihintay"; Marion Aunor – "Take A Chance'; Sarah Geronimo – "Tala"; Willie Revillame – "Nando'n Ako"	
9th (2017)	Iñigo Pascual	"Dahil Sa'yo"	Alden Richards – "Rescue Me"; James Wright – "My Destiny"; Julie Anne San Jose – "Chasing the Light"; Michael Pangilinan – "Hanggang Kailan"; Sud – "Sila"; Yeng Constantino – "Paasa"	
10th (2018)	Ex Battalion	"Hayaan Mo Sila"	Christian Bautista – "Kapit; James Reid – "Cool Down"; Jona – "Sampu"; Moira Dela Torre – "Titibo-tibo"; Ogie Alcasid – "Nakakalokal"; Shanti Dope – "Nadarang"	
11th (2020)	Juan Karlos	"Buwan"	Alex Gonzaga – "Chambe"; Allmo$t – "Dalaga"; December Avenue & Moira Dela Torre – "Kung 'Di Rin Lang Ikaw"; I Belong to the Zoo – "Sana"; Jason Marvin & Moira Dela Torre – "Ikaw At Ako"; This Band – "Hindi Na Nga"	
12th (2021)	Daniel Padilla & Moira Dela Torre	"Mabagal"	Agsunta – "King 'Di Na Ako"; Ben&Ben – "Pagtingin"; December Avenue – "Huling Sandali"; I Belong to the Zoo & Moira Dela Torre – "Patawad, Paalam"; KZ Tandingan feat. Shanti Dope – "Imposible"; Sharlene San Pedro feat. Zack Tabudlo – "Pusong Naliligaw"	
13th (2022)	Moira Dela Torre	"Paubaya"	Ben&Ben – "'Di Ka Sayang"; JM Bales – "Magandang Dilag"; Juan Caoile & Kyleswish – "Marikit; Matthaios feat. Calvin de Leon – "Binibini"; Parokya Ni Edgar, Gloc-9, and Shanti Dope – "Pati Pato"	
14th (2022)	SB19	"Mapa"	Adie – "Paraluman"; Bandang Lapis – "Nang Dumating Ka"; Belle Mariano – "Sigurado"; Maymay Entrata – "Amakabogera"; Jason Marvin & Moira Dela Torre – "Ikaw at Ako"; Zack Tabudlo – "Binibini"	
15th (2022)	Dilaw	"Uhaw"	Ben&Ben – "Panindigan Kita"; Julie Anne San Jose – "Babaguhin ang Buong Mundo"; Moira Dela Torre – "Kumpas"; SunKissed Lola – "Pasilyo"; This Band – "Higit sa Sapat"; Zack Tabudlo – "Give Me Your Forever"	
16th (2024)	SB19	"Gento"	Bini – "Pantropiko"; Juan Karlos – "Ere"; Lola Amour – "Raining in Manila"; Moira Dela Torre – "Ikaw at Sila"; Zack Tabudlo – "Gusto"	
17th (2026)	Maki	"Dilaw"	Dionela – "Marilag"; Cup of Joe – "Multo"; Lola Amour – "Nami-miss Ko Na"; TJ Monterde – "Palagi"; Amiel Sol – "Sa Bawat Sandali"; Bini – "Salamin, Salamin"	

== Artist with multiple awards ==
Two awards

- Moira Dela Torre
- SB19

== Artist with multiple nominations ==
Nine nominations

- Moira Dela Torre

Four nominations

- Gloc-9
- Juan Karlos
- Sarah Geronimo

Three nominations

- Ben&Ben
- Jona
- Julie Anne San Jose
- Shanti Dope
- Yeng Constantino

Two nominations

- Angeline Quinto
- Daniel Padilla
- December Avenue
- I Belong to the Zoo
- Jason Marvin
- Juris
- KZ Tandingan
- Callalily
- Michael Pangilinan
- SB19
