= 1st PMPC Star Awards for Music =

- Date: October 29, 2009
- Venue: Skydome, SM City North EDSA; Quezon City
- Hosted by: Billy Crawford; Toni Gonzaga

Television/radio coverage
- Directed by: Louie Ignacio

The 1st PMPC Star Awards for Music by the Philippine Movie Press Club (PMPC), honored the best Filipino music of 2008. The ceremony took place on October 29, 2009, in Skydome, SM City North EDSA in Quezon City.

The PMPC Star Awards for Music was hosted by Billy Crawford and Toni Gonzaga. The award ceremony was produced by National Press Club (NPC) and Alyansang ng Filipinong Mamahayag (AFIMA).

== Winners and nominees ==
The following are the nominations for the 1st PMPC Star Awards for Music, covering music released in 2008.

Winners are listed first and indicated in bold.

=== Major categories ===
Album of the Year	Song of the Year
**"Your Universe" – Rico Blanco (Warner Music Philippines)**; **Rico Blanco, producer; Jim Baluyot, executive producer**; "Biyaya" – Bayang Barrios; Bayang Barrios & Mike Villegas (Produktong Mayumi ni Bayang Barrios), producers; "Buhay" – Rivermaya (Warner Music Philippines); Producer: Rivermaya, producer; Jim Baluyot, executive producer; "Captured" – Christian Bautista (Warner Music Philippines); Producer: Neil Gregorio, producer; Jim Baluyot, executive producer; "OPM" – Sarah Geronimo (Viva Records); Eugene Villaluz Eloisa Matias, Melvin Morallos, Alwyn Cruz, Patty Mayoraigo, Lito Camo, Civ Fontanilla & Regine Velasquez, producers; Vic Del Rosario, Tony Ocampo & Vincent Del Rosario, executive producers; "The Itchyworms" – The Itchyworms (Sony Music Philippines); Itchyworms, producer; Rudy Y. Tee, exexutive producer; "Rebirth" – Gary Valenciano (Universal Records); GV Producrtions, Inc. and Universal Records, producers; Katheleen Dy-Go, Angeli Pangilinan-Valenciano, executive producers; Gary Valenciano, album producer	**"Ikaw ang Aking Pangarap" – Martin Nievera from the album "Ikaw Ang Aking Pangarap" (EMI Records)**; Ogie Alcasid, composer; Arnold Buena, arranger; "Hanggang Kailan" – Jolina Magdangal from the album "Jolina Destiny" (GMA Records); Agatha Obar, composer; Melvin Morallos, arranger; "Ikaw" – Sarah Geronimo from the album "OPM" (Viva Records); Medwin Marfil, composer; Nino Regalado, arranger; "Ikaw Na Nga" – Willie Revillame from the album "Ikaw Na Nga" (Star Records); Vehnee Saturno, composer; Elmer Blancafor, arranger; "Now" – MYMP from the album of the same title (Ivory Records); Cattski Espina, Bami; composers Chin Alcantara, arranger; "Paano Na Kaya" – Bugoy Drilon from the album of the same title. (Star Records); Ryan Cayabyab, composer; Arnold Buena, arranger; "Your Universe" – Rico Blanco from the album of the same title. (Warner Music Philippines); Rico Blanco, composer & arranger
Male Recording Artist of the Year	Female Recording Artist of the Year
**Ogie Alcasid – "Great Filipino Song Book (Universal Records)**; Billy Crawford – "Groove" (Universal Records); Gary Valenciano – "Rebirth" (Universal Records); Jed Madela – "Songs Rediscovered 2" (Universal Records); Martin Nievera – "Ikaw ang Aking Pangarap" (EMI Records); Richard Poon – "For You" Universal (MCA); Rico Blanco – "Your Universe" (Warner Music Philippines)	**Regine Velasquez – "Low Key" (Universal Records)**; Aiza Seguerra – "Open Arms" (Star Records); Bayang Barrios – "Biyaya" (Produktong Mayumi ni Bayang Barrios); Lea Salonga – "Inspired" (Sony BMG); Lani Misalucha – "Reminisce" (Universal Records); Rachelle Ann Go – "Falling In Love" (Viva Records); Sarah Geronimo – "OPM" (Viva Records)
New Male Recording Artist of the Year	New Female Recording Artist of the Year
**Bugoy Drilon – "Paano na Kaya" (Star Records)**; Jmore – "Self Titled" (LDG Prod. & Ent.Recording Co.); Lemuel Santos – "Mahal" (Concorde Records); Ramil Omusura – "One Minute" (Concorde Records); Simon Wood – "SW" (Viva Records); Sundalong Bata – "Sundalong Bata & Miss Ganda (Hip-Rap)" (Warner Music Philippines); Vince Kamua – "Spells of a Young Crooner" (Viva Records)	**Maricris Garcia – "Mahal Kita" (GMA Records)**; Bea Alonzo – "The Real Me" (Star Records); KC Concepcion – "Aka Cassandra" (Sony BMG Music); Laarni Lozada – "Kung Iniibig Ka Niya" (Star Records); Martha Joy – "Self Titled " (Viva Records); Pokwang – "Album Na May Puso" (Star Records); Sabrina – "I Love Acoustic" (MCA Music/Universal)
Duo/Group of the Year	Music Video of the Year
**MYMP – "Now" (Ivory Records)**; Cueshé – "Driven" (Sony BMG Music); The Itchyworms – "The Itchyworms" (Sony BMG Music); Kamikazee – "Long Time Noisy" (Universal Records); 6cyclemind – "Fiesta: Magsasaya ang Lahat (Sony BMG Music); Sponge Cola – "Sponge Cola" (Universal Records); Rivermaya – "Rivermaya" (Warner Music Philippines)	**"Pambansang Kamao" – D'Coy (Wika Records)**; **Ace Villena, director**; "And I Love You So" – Regine Velasquez (Universal Records); Treb Contreras II, director; "Antukin" – Rico Blanco (Warner Music Philippines); Treb Contreras II, director; "Happy" – Sam Concepcion (Universal Records); Paul Soriano, director; "Ikaw" – Sarah Geronimo (Viva Records); Direk Paul Basinilio of Denim Inc., director; "Sexy Mama" – Janno Gibbs (GMA Records); Milos Curameng, director; "When I Hear You Call" – Gary Valenciano (Universal Records); Luis Tabuena, director

=== Pop category ===
Pop Album of the Year	Male Pop Artist of the Year
**"Ikaw Na Nga" – Willie Revillame (Star Records)**; "Ikaw Ang Aking Pangarap" – Martin Nievera (EMI Records); "Inspired" – Lea Salonga (Sony BMG); "OPM" – Sarah Geronimo (Viva Records); "My Inspiration" – Charice Pempengco (Star Records); "Captured" – Christian Bautista (Warner Music Philippines); "Invitation To A Wedding" – Gary Granada (M2K Music)	**Jed Madela – "Songs Rediscovered 2" (Universal Records)**; Christian Bautista – "Captured" (Warner Music Philippines); Gary Valenciano – "Rebirth" (Universal Records); Jan Nieto – "Jan Nieto" (Universal Records); Martin Nievera – "Ikaw ang Aking Pangarap" (EMI Records); Ogie Alcasid – "Great Filipino Song Book (Universal Records); Richard Poon – "For You" (Universal /MCA)
Female Pop Artist of the Year	
**Sarah Geronimo – "OPM" (Viva Records)**; Charice Pempengco – "My Inspiration" (Star Records); Lani Misalucha – "Reminisce" (Universal Records); Lea Salonga – "Inspired" (Sony BMG); Nina – "Nina Sings The Hits" (Warner Music Philippines); Regine Velasquez – "Low Key" (Universal Records); Rachelle Ann Go – "Falling In Love" (Viva Records)	

=== Rock, RnB and Acoustic category ===
Rock Album of the Year	Rock Artist of the Year
**"Long Time Noisy" – Kamikazee (Universal Records)**; "Journey" – Yeng Constantino (Star Records); "Markus Hi- way" – Marcus Hi-way (Warner Music Philippines); "Sulit " – Ram Chaves Band (GMA Records); "Tersera" – Mayonnaise (Viva Records)	**Kamikazee – "Long Time Noisy" (Universal Records)**; Mayonnaise – "Tersera" (Viva Records); Markus Hi-way – "Markus Hi-way" (Warner Music Philippines); Ram Chaves Band – "Sulit" (GMA Records); Yeng Constantino – "Journey" (Star Records)
RnB Album of the Year	RnB Artist of the Year
**"Groove" – Billy Crawford (Universal Records)**; "Heart 2 Heart" – Kyla (PolyEast Records); "Soul In Love" – Jay R (Universal Records)	**Billy Crawford – "Groove" (Universal Records)**; Jay R – "Soul In Love" (Universal Records); Kyla – "Heart 2 Heart (PolyEast Records)
Acoustic Album of the Year	Acoustic Artist of the Year
**"Back to Basics" – Paolo Santos (Ivory Records)**; "Heartstrings" – Nyoy Volante (Vicor Records); "Now" – MYMP (Ivory Records); "Open Arms" – Aiza Seguerra (Star Records)	Aiza Seguerra – "Open Arms" (Star Records): MYMP – "Now" (Ivory Records); Nyoy Volante – "Heartstrings" (Vicor Records); Paolo Santos – "Back to Basics" (Ivory Records)

=== Album category ===
Alternative Album of the Year	Revival Album of the Year
**"Biyaya" – Bayang Barrios (Star Records)**; "Driven" – Cueshé (Sony BMG Music); "Fiesta! Magsasaya Ang Lahat" – 6cyclemind (Sony BMG Music); "The ItchyWorms" – The Itchyworms (Sony BMG Music); " Rivermaya" – Rivermaya (Warner Music Philippines); "Sponge Cola" – Sponge Cola (Universal Records); "Your Universe" – Rico Blanco (Warner Music Philippines)	**"Low Key" – Regine Velasquez (Universal Records)**; "Falling In Love" – Rachelle Ann Go (Viva Records); "Great Filipino Song Book" – Ogie Alcasid (Universal Records); "Groove" – Billy Crawford (Universal Records); "Nina Sings The Hits" – Nina (Warner Music Philippines); "Reminisce" – Lani Misalucha (Universal Records); "Songs Rediscovered 2" – Jed Madela (Universal Records)
Compilation Album of the Year	Dance Album of the Year
**"Lovelife" – Boy Abunda (Star Records)**; "Best of Pinoy Folk Rock" Artist – Various artists (Universal Records); "Face Off" – Erik Santos & Christian Bautista (Star Records); "OPM 1's – Various artists (Star Records); "Pinoy Sound Trip" – Various artists (Viva Records); "Platinum Ballad Collection" – Gary Valenciano (Universal Records); "Senti Dos" Artist - Various artists (Vicor Records)	**"Delisciosa" – Mocha Girls (Viva Records)**; "Let's Dance" – Streetboys (Star Records); "Giling giling" – Willie Revillame (Star Records)
Album Cover Design of the Year	
**"Complicated" – Gretchen Barretto (Star Records)**; **Andrew Castillo, graphic designer**; "Groove" – Billy Crawford (Universal Records); Jay Saturnino D. Lumboy, graphic designer; "Long Time Noisy" – Kamikazee (Universal Records); Three Floors Up, graphic designer; "Lovelife" – Boy Abunda (Star Records); Andrew Castillo & Kevin Cabrera, graphic designers; "Low Key" – Regine Velasquez (Universal Records); Jay Saturnino D. Lumboy, graphic designer; "Reminisce" – Lani Misalucha (Universal Records); Jay Saturnino D. Lumboy, graphic designer; "We are 1" – Kris Aquino & Baby James (Star Records); Annabelle Regalado- Borja, graphic designer

=== Special awards ===
- Lifetime Achievement Awards: Apo Hiking Society
