= Paano Na Kaya? (album) =

Studio album by Bugoy Drilon
- Released: 2008
- Genre: Pop
- Label: Star Records

Bugoy Drilon chronology
Paano Na Kaya? (2008)	Bugoy Drilon (2010)

Singles from Paano Na Kaya
- 1. "Paano Na Kaya?" Released: 2008; 2. "Muli" Released: 2009; 3. "Kung P'wede Lang Sana" Released: 2009

Paano Na Kaya? is the first album by Filipino singer Bugoy Drilon. It contains 12 tracks in which the last 6 songs are the minus one (instrumental) versions of the first 6 songs. The album was awarded a gold record plaque on July 19, 2009.

== Track listing ==
1. "Paano Na Kaya?"
2. "Kung P'wede Lang Sana"
3. "Muli"
4. "Bakit Ba?"
5. "Simulan Mo sa Isang Pangarap"
6. "Lahat ng 'Yan"
7. "Paano Na Kaya?" (minus one)
8. "Kung P'wede Lang Sana" (minus one)
9. "Muli" (minus one)
10. "Bakit Ba?" (minus one)
11. "Simulan Mo sa Isang Pangarap" (minus one)
12. "Lahat ng 'Yan" (minus one)

== Singles ==
"Paano Na Kaya?" is the title track and first single from the album. The song was composed by the headmaster of Pinoy Dream Academy (season 2) Ryan Cayabyab for the album Scholars Sing Cayabyab. The song was later used on the soundtrack of the 2010 film of the same title, starring Kim Chiu and Gerald Anderson.

"Muli" is a cover version originally performed by Rodel Naval. The song was included on the soundtrack of ABS-CBN's Philippine remake of the koreanovela Only You.

"Kung P'wede Lang Sana" was the third single from the album.
