= Laarni Lozada (album) =

- Album Cover

Studio album by Laarni Lozada
- Released: 2008
- Recorded: 2008
- Genre: OPM, pop, R&B
- Language: English, Tagalog
- Label: Star Records

Laarni Lozada is the eponymous debut album from Pinoy Dream Academy Season 2 winner Laarni Lozada, released on November 27, 2008. The lead single was "Kung Iniibig Ka Niya".

== Track listing ==
1. "Kung Iniibig Ka Niya"
2. "You're Someone I Belong To"
3. "Sa ‘Yo Lamang"
4. "Alipin Ako"
5. "Bakit Nga Ba Mahal Kita"
6. "Manalig Ka"

== Covers ==
- Liezel Garcia's Alipin Ako cover was used as the theme song for the Korean drama You're Still The One which aired in ABS-CBN.
