= 11th PMPC Star Awards for Music =

- Date: January 23, 2020
- Venue: Sky-dome, SM City North EDSA; Quezon City
- Hosted by: Christian Bautista; Kris Lawrence; Ariella Arida

The 11th PMPC Star Awards for Music by the Philippine Movie Press Club (PMPC), honored the best Filipino music of 2018. The ceremony took place on January 23, 2020 in Skydome, SM City North EDSA, Quezon City.

The PMPC Star Awards for Music was hosted by Kris Lawrence, Christian Bautista and Ariella Arida.

== Winners and nominees ==
The following are the nominations for the 11th PMPC Star Awards for Music, covering music released in 2018.

Winners are listed first and indicated in bold.

=== Major categories ===
Album of the Year	Song of the Year
**"Queen Of Soul" – Jaya (Star Music)**; "Alon" – Hale (Warner Music Philippines); "Breakthrough" – Julie Anne San Jose (Universal Records); "Himig Handog 2018" – Various artists (Star Music); "Megastar" – Sharon Cuneta (Star Music); "Sea of Lights" – Sponge Cola (Universal Records); "Sentimental" – True Faith (Star Music); "Superhero" – Jed Madela (Star Music)	**"Buwan" – Juan Karlos (MCA Music, Inc.)**; "Chambe" – Alex Gonzaga (Star Music); "Dalaga" – Allmo$t (Viva Records); "Hindi Na Nga" – This Band (Viva Records); "Ikaw at Ako" – Moira dela Torre and Jason Marvin) (Star Music); "Kahit Ayaw Mo Na" – This Band (Viva Records); "Kung 'Di Rin Lang Ikaw" December Avenue feat. Moira Dela Torre (Tower of Doom Records); "Sana" – I Belong to the Zoo (Yellow Room Music Philippines)
Male Recording Artist of the Year	Female Recording Artist of the Year
**Christian Bautista – "Aking Mahal" (Universal Records); and**; **Jed Madela – "Di Matitinag" (Star Music) (tied)**; Alden Richards – "Until I See You Again" (GMA Music); Billy Crawford – "Filipina Girl" (Viva Records); Daniel Padilla – "Malay Ko" Star Music; Gary Valenciano – "Ililigtas Ka Niya (Star Music); Juan Karlos – "Buwan" (MCA Music); Ronnie Liang – "Ligaya" (Viva Records)	**Moira Dela Torre – "Kahit Maputi Na Ang Buhok Ko" (Star Music)**; Alex Gonzaga – "Chambe" (Star Music); Jaya – "Hanggang Dito Na Lang" (Star Music); Jona – "Ngayon at Kailanman" (Star Music); Julie Anne San Jose – "Tayong Dalawa" (Universal Records); Juris – "Say That You Love Me" (Star Music); Regine Velasquez – "Ikaw Ang Aking Mahal" (Star Music); Sharon Cuneta – "Hanggang Dulo" (Star Music)
New Male Recording Artist of the Year	New Female Recording Artist of the Year
**Gari Escobar – "Baguio" (Ivory Music); and**; **Garrett Bolden – "Lilipad Na" (GMA Music)**; Anthony Rosaldo – "Larawan Mo" (GMA Music); Chan Millanes "Tuldok" (PolyEast Records); Edward Barber "#EO8O6" (Star Music); Jong Madaliday – "Ano Ba" (GMA Music); Ryan Tamondong – "Haay Pag-ibig" (Star Music); Yam Sison – "Kayang-Kaya" (I Entertainment Management)	**Jayda Avanzado – "Happy For You" (Star Music); and**; **Via Ortega – "Paghanga" (Viva Records) (tied)**; Golden Cañedo – "Ngayon" (GMA Music); Izzeah – "City Light" (PolyEast Records); Loisa Andalio – "Sasamahan Kita" (Star Music); Mara Aragon – "Everything You Are" (Vehnee Saturno Music); Maris Racal – "Ikaw Lang Sapat Na" (Star Music); Mirriam Manalo – "Una Ka" (GMA Music)
Duo/Group of the Year	New Group of the Year
**TNT Boys – "Show Me A Smile" (Star Music)**; Banda Ni Kleggy – "Mandirigma Ng Pag-ibig" (Warner Music Philippines); Beautiful Let Down – "Where Do I Go" (PolyEast Records); BoybandPH – "Hanggang Kailan Kaya" (Star Music); Hale – "Alon" (Warner Music Philippines); Hashtags – "Hold Up" (Star Music); Mayonnaise – "Gusto Ko Lang" (Ivory Music); This Band – "Hindi Na Nga" (Viva Records)	**This Band – "Kahit Ayaw Mo Na" (Viva Records)**; Allmo$t – "Dalaga" (Viva Records); BellaDonnas – "Sa Una Pa Lang" (3:16 Events and Talent Management Company); Down By 18 – "Piring" (Viva Records); SB19 – "Tilaluha" (ShowBT Entertainment); 5th String Band – "Kamiseta" (Viva Records)
Music Video of the Year	
**"This World For Us All" – Aekaye (LST Music Production)**; **Dong Pilotos, director**; "Bagong Umaga" – Agsunta (Star Music); Miko Pelino, director; "Filipina Girl" – Billy Crawford feat. Marcus Davis & James Reid (Viva Records); Kenneth Gabona, director; "Gaga" – Nar Cabico (GMA Music); Nar Cabico and Nicco Manalo, directors; "Hindi Na Nga" – This Band (Viva Records); Kiko Meily, director; "One More Heart" – Suy Galvez (LST Music Production); Frank Lloyd Mamaril, director; "Regrets" – Julie Anne San Jose (Universal Records); JC Echanes and Hush Magtoto, directors; "Sugarol" – Maris Racal (Star Music); John Leo D. Garcia, director	

=== Pop category ===
Pop Album of the Year	Male Pop Artist of the Year
**"Until I See You Again" – Alden Richards (GMA Music)**; "#EO806" – Edward Barber (Star Music); "D4" – Daniel Padilla (Star Music); "Decade" – Bugoy Drilon (Star Music); "Erik Santos: 15" – Erik Santos (Star Music); "Kyline" – Kyline Alcantara (GMA Music); "Loisa" – Loisa Andalio (Star Music); "Stellar" – Maris Racal (Star Music)	**Marlo Mortel – "Habang Ako’y Mag-isa" (Star Music); and**; **Erik Santos – "Nais" (Star Music) (tied)**; Daniel Padilla – "Ikaw Ang Musika Ko" (Star Music); Darren Espanto – "Poison" (MCA Music); Jericho Rosales – "Hardin" (Star Music); Joaquin Garcia – "Don't Know What To Say, Don't Know What To Do" (Media Sync Production); Alden Richards – "Until I See You Again" (GMA Music); Carlo Aquino – "Komplikado" (Ivory Music)
Female Pop Artist of the Year	
**Janah Zaplan – "'Di Ko Na Kaya" (Ivory Music)**; Alex Gonzaga – "Chambe" (Star Music); Julie Anne San Jose – "Regrets" (Universal Records); Kyline Alcantara – "Fake Love" (GMA Music); Loisa Andalio – "Sasabay sa Ulan" (Star Music); Maris Racal – "High Crush" (Star Music); Rita Daniela – "Florita" (GMA Music); Sharlene San Pedro – "Pa'no Ang Lahat" (Ivory Music)	

=== Rock, Rap, RnB and Acoustic category ===
Rock Album of the Year	Rock Artist of the Year
**"Alon" – Hale (Warner Music Philippines)**; "ClapClapClap! – IV of Spades (Warner Music Philippines); "Grandma – Unique Salonga (O/C Records); "Joe and Mike Chan" – Joe and Mike Chan (Star Music); "Plug N' Play" – Agadiers (Viva Records); "Sea of Lights" – Sponge Cola (Universal Records); "Album Deluxe" – Banda ni Klergy (Warner Music Philippines); "Takipsilim" – Autotelic (MCA Music, Inc.)	**Sponge Cola – "Kunwari" (Universal Records)**; Agadiers – "Gugma" (Viva Records); Autotelic – "Takipsilim" (MCA Music, Inc.); IV of Spades – "Bawat Kaluluwa" (Warner Music Philippines); Jose Carlito – "My Generation" (Star Music); Unique Salonga – "Ozone, Itulak ang Pinto" (O/C Records); Unit 406 – "Unit 406" (Star Music); Yonin High – "Rock And Roll Angel" (Star Music)
RnB Album of the Year	RnB Artist of the Year
**"Queen Of Soul" – Jaya (Star Music)**; "Highs and Lows" – Mikee Misalucha (GMA Music)	**Young JV – "Ghost" (Star Music)**; Aby – "Alone" (Ivory Music); Chan Millanes – "Tuldok" (PolyEast Records); Jaya – "Hanggang Dito Na Lang" (Star Music); Mikee Misalucha – "I Got You" (GMA Music); Sassa Dagdag – "Picking Petals" (PolyEast Records); Zack Tabudlo – "The Way You Wanted" (Ivory Music)
Rap Arist of the Year	Acoustic Artist of the Year
**Ex Battalion feat. Alden Richards (Superhero Mo) (GMA Music)**; Allmo$t – "Dalaga" (Viva Records); Blanktape – "Pekeng Pag-ibig" (Lodi Records); Gloc-9 – "Lagi" (Universal Records); Jayson Diwa – "Sabungero" (Rebolusyon Rekords); Jerzoned – "GYSB" (Ivory Music); Kritiko – "Kababata" (Star Music); Maze – "Pure Mind Quiet Heart" (Ivory Music)	**Juris – "Say That You Love Me"(Star Music)**; Davey Langit – "Gitna" (Star Music); Noel Cabangon – "Wala Nang Dahilan Pang Umasa" (Universal Records); Patrick Quiroz – "Lullaby" (Star Music); Rayt Carreon – "Miss Chubby" (Star Music)
Folk/Country Recording of the Year	Collaboration of the Year
**"Start All Over Again" – John Rendez (Star Music)**; "Branches" – Ben&Ben (Sony Music Philippines); "Dalawang Tao" – Rice Lucido (O/C Records); "Jack En Poy" – Bullet Dumas (Star Music); "Kayumanggi" – Bugoy Drilon (Star Music); "Litung-lito" – "Vincent Eco" (22 Tango Records); "Luksong Tinik" – Joey Ayala (Star Music)	**"Kung "Di Rin Lang Ikaw" – December Avenue and Moira Dela Torre (Tower of Doom Records)**; "Filipina Girl" – Billy Crawford, Marcus Davis and James Reid (Viva Records); "Pagbigyang Muli" – Erik Santos and Regine Velasquez (Star Music); "Superhero Mo" – Ex Battalion and Alden Richards (GMA Music); "Down For Me" – Fern and Julie Anne San Jose (Universal Records); "Lagi" – Gloc-9 and Al James (Universal Records); "Tayo Na 'Di Tayo" – Iñigo Pascual and Maris Racal (Star Music); "Kababata" – Kritiko and Kyla (Star Music)

=== Novelty category ===
Novelty Song of the Year	Novelty Artist of the Year
**"Dahil Kasama Mo Siya" – Vice Ganda (Star Music)**; "Gigilicious" – DJ Eva Ronda (Star Music); "Katuga" – Mojack Perez (Lodi Records); "Malia, Malia" – Malia feat. Pokwang (Star Music); "Namo" – Bugoy Drilon (Star Music); "Pekeng Pag-ibig" – BlankTape (Lodi Music)	**Mojack Perez – "Katuga" (Lodi Records)**; BlankTape – "Pekeng Pag-ibig" (Lodi Music); Bugoy Drilon – "Namo" (Star Music); DJ Jhai Ho and DJ Joco Loco – "Agey Agey Hey" (Star Music); Mel Sorillano – "Bakit Pa Kasi" (Ivory Music); Vice Ganda – "Dahil Kasama Mo Siya" (Star Music)

=== Album category ===
Dance Album of the Year	Revival Album of the Year
**"Chambe" – Alex Gonzaga (Star Music)**; "Ako Lang Sana" – Hashtags (Star Music); "Breathless" – Jayda Avanzado (Star Music); "Cebuana" – Karencitta (Viva Records); "Otso Na" – Toni Gonzaga and Alex Gonzaga (Star Music); "Poison" – Darren Espanto (MCA Music, Inc.); "Sasamahan Kita" – Loisa Andalio (Star Music)	**"Don't Know What To Say, Don't Know What To Do" – Joaquin Garcia (Media Sync Production)**; "Be My Lady" – Erard (Star Music); "Even The Nights Are Better" – Kyla (Star Music); "Handog" – Jojo Mendrez (Star Image Artist Management); "Isang Linggong Pag-ibig" – LA Santos (Star Music); "Ligaya" – Ronnie Liang (Viva Records); "Ngayon at Kailanman" – Jona (Star Music); "Sana Ngayong Pasko" – Sarah Javier (Music R Us)
Compilation Album of the Year	
**"Himig Handog 2018" – Various artists (Star Music)**; "Awit Laro" – Various artists (Star Music); "Mga Awit Kapuso Vol. 9" – Various artists (GMA Music)	

=== Concert category ===
Concert of the Year	Male Concert Performer of the Year
**The 40th Anniversary Concert – Lea Salonga (Eastwest and Paggs)**; Aegis Doble Dekada: Ang Soundtrack Ng Buhay Mo – Aegis (ABS-CBN Events and Live Artists); Jed Madela XV: Higher Than High – Jed Madela (Star Events); Jojo Mendrez: The Revival King Live! – Jojo Mendrez (Aqueous Entertainment); Lani-Morisette: A Musical Journey – Lani Misalucha and Morissette (Solaire Resort and Casino); My 40 Years – Sharon Cuneta (San Miguel Corporation); OA: 30th Anniversary Concert – Ogie Alcasid (ABS-CBN Events, Star Events and A Team); Regine at the Movies – Regine Velasquez (Amore Entertainment); The Songbird and the Songhorse – Regine Velasquez and Vice Ganda (ABS-CBN Events and Star Events)	**Ogie Alcasid – OA 30th Anniversary Concert (ABS-CBN Events, Star Events and A Team)**; Darren Espanto – Unstoppable (MCA Music Inc.); Erik Santos – My Greatest Moments (Cornerstone Concerts and Lucky 7 Koi Productions); Gerald Santos – Homecoming (Media Biz, Echo Jham and Twin Productions International, Inc.); Jed Madela – Jed Madela XV: Higher Than High (Star Events); Martin Nievera – Timeless Classics (Starmedia Entertainment); Richard Poon – RP10: 10th Anniversary Concert (Cornerstone Concerts and Resorts World Manila); Vice Ganda – The Songbird And The Songhorse (ABS-CBN Events and Star Events)
Female Concert Performer of the Year	Duo/Group Concert of the Year
**Morisette – Lani-Morisette: A Musical Journey (Solaire Resort & Casino)**; Kuh Ledesma – The 2nd Kuh Event (Advanced Aesthetics by Dr. Venia Javellana); KZ Tandingan – Supreme (Star Events and Cornerstone Concerts); Lani Misalucha – Lani-Morisette: A Musical Journey (Solaire Resort & Casino); Lea Salonga – Lea Salonga: The 40th Anniversary Concert (Eastwest and Paggs); Regine Velasquez – Regine At The Movies (iMusic Entertainment, Inc.); Sharon Cuneta – My 40 Years, Sharon (San Miguel Corporation); Yeng Constantino – ExtraOrdinary (Cornerstone Concerts)	**Aegis – Doble Dekada: Ang Soundtrack Ng Buhay Mo (ABS-CBN Events and Live Artists)**; TNT Boys – TNT Boys: The Big Shot Concert (ABS-CBN Events TNTV and Star Events)

Note: There were no entries for Alternative Album of the Year, no entries for Acoustic Album and Rap Album category

=== Special awards ===
Levi Celerio Lifetime Achievement Award: Jose Mari Chan

Pilita Corrales Lifetime Achievement Award: Regine Velasquez

PEOPLE'S CHOICE AWARD:

- Male Pop Artist of the Year: Joaquin Garcia (Don't Know What To Say, Don't Know What To Do)
- Female Pop Artist of the Year: Julie Anne San Jose (Regrets)
