= Nang Dahil sa Pag-Ibig (album) =

Nang Dahil sa Pag-ibig

Studio album by Bugoy Drilon
- Released: March 22, 2011
- Genres: OPM, pop ballad
- Length: 52 minutes
- Label: Star Records

Bugoy Drilon chronology
Bugoy Drilon (2010)	Nang Dahil sa Pag-ibig (2011)	Bugoy (Decade) (2018)

Singles from Nang Dahil sa Pag-Ibig
- 1. "Paano Na Ang Puso Ko" Released: 2011; 2. "Mayro'n Na Bang Iba" Released: 2011; 3. "Nagmamakaawa" Released: 2011

Nang Dahil sa Pag-ibig is the third studio album by Filipino singer Bugoy Drilon, released on March 22, 2011 through Star Records. The album takes its title from its opening track, "Nang Dahil sa Pag-ibig", a revival of a song written by Jose Larry Hermoso and first recorded by Tootsie Guevarra on her 2000 album Sa Puso Ko. Alongside four further new recordings, the album reprises three of Drilon's earlier singles as bonus tracks: "Paano Na Kaya?" and "Muli" from his 2008 debut, and "Hindi Na Bale" from his 2010 self-titled album. The title track was named Most Downloaded Song of 2011 by I-Gateway Mobile Philippines Inc. at the 25th Awit Awards, and the album was a nominee for Pop Album of the Year at the 3rd Star Awards for Music, where Drilon was also nominated for Male Pop Artist of the Year.

== Background ==
Drilon started recording music in 2008 when he won as first runner-up in the second season of the reality television series Pinoy Dream Academy broadcast in ABS-CBN. His debut album Paano Na Kaya? was released in 2009. The album was carried by the single "Muli" and produced further hits with its title track, composed by Ryan Cayabyab, which reached number one on radio request rankings nationwide. Following a second, self-titled album in 2010, Drilon returned in 2011 with Nang Dahil sa Pag-ibig, released under the same label.

== Composition ==
The album's title track, "Nang Dahil sa Pag-ibig", is a revival of a song written by Jose Larry Hermoso and first recorded by Tootsie Guevarra for her 2000 album Sa Puso Ko. It is joined by four further new recordings — "Mayro'n Na Bang Iba", "Paano Na Ang Puso Ko", "Nagmamakaawa", and "Bulag Sa Katotohanan" — continuing the romantic-ballad style of Drilon's earlier releases. Rounding out the album are three bonus tracks reprising earlier Drilon singles: "Paano Na Kaya?" and "Muli" from his 2008 debut album, and "Hindi Na Bale" from his 2010 self-titled album. The commercial release additionally paired the five new songs with instrumental "minus one" versions.

== Release and reception ==
Nang Dahil sa Pag-ibig was released on March 11, 2011 under Star Records, credited on the recording itself to ABS-CBN Film Productions, Inc. The title track was named the year's Most Downloaded Song by I-Gateway Mobile Philippines Inc. at the 25th Awit Awards, held 27 November 2012 at Glorietta 1 in Makati City. The album was also a nominee for Pop Album of the Year at the 3rd Star Awards for Music of the Philippine Movie Press Club, where Drilon received a nomination for Male Pop Artist of the Year; that ceremony was held October 16, 2011 at the Lee Irwin Theatre, Ateneo de Manila University.

The music video of the carrier single "Paano Na Ang Puso Ko" was released on June 7, 2011 on ABS-CBN Star Music YouTube channel.

== Track listing ==
Nang Dahil sa Pag-Ibig track listing
No.	Title	Producer(s)	Length
1.	"Nang Dahil sa Pag-ibig"	ABS-CBN Film Productions, Inc.	4:22
2.	"Mayro'n Na Bang Iba"	ABS-CBN Film Productions, Inc.	3:32
3.	"Paano Na Ang Puso Ko"	ABS-CBN Film Productions, Inc.	4:07
4.	"Nagmamakaawa"	ABS-CBN Film Productions, Inc.	4:06
5.	"Bulag Sa Katotohanan"	ABS-CBN Film Productions, Inc.	3:59
6.	"Nang Dahil sa Pag-ibig (Minus One)"	ABS-CBN Film Productions, Inc.	4:19
7.	"Mayro'n Na Bang Iba (Minus One)"	ABS-CBN Film Productions, Inc.	3:32
8.	"Paano Na Ang Puso Ko (Minus One)"	ABS-CBN Film Productions, Inc.	4:07
9.	"Nagmamakaawa (Minus One)"	ABS-CBN Film Productions, Inc.	4:06
10.	"Bulag Sa Katotohanan (Minus One)"	ABS-CBN Film Productions, Inc.	3:57
11.	"Paano Na Kaya?" (Bonus track, from Drilon's 2008 debut album)	ABS-CBN Film Productions, Inc.	4:16
12.	"Muli" (Bonus track, from Drilon's 2008 debut album)	ABS-CBN Film Productions, Inc.	4:08
13.	"Hindi Na Bale" (Bonus track, from Drilon's 2010 self-titled album)	ABS-CBN Film Productions, Inc.	4:09
Total length:			52:48

== Personnel ==
- Bugoy Drilon – lead vocals
- Star Records – record label
