= Van Roxas =

- Born: Van Louelle Pojas; November 8, 1989 (age 36); Talisay, Cebu, Philippines
- Occupations: Singer television personality former reality show contestant
- Years active: 2008–2011

Van Roxas (born Van Louelle Pojas on November 8, 1989) is a Filipino actor, television personality, and former reality show contestant. He placed as the 5th Star Dreamer of Pinoy Dream Academy Season 2. He did a show with the Drama Princess of ABS-CBN's Kim Chiu entitles Maling Akala.

== Personal life ==
Van Louelle Pojas better known as Van Roxas is from Talisay, Cebu. He is a Physical Therapy student and band vocalist from Cebu.

His parents have separated, his mother is in the States while his father has his own life away from Van.

He was a support act of the Irish pop band Westlife for their 2011 Gravity Tour.

== Filmography ==
Year	Title	Role	Notes
2011	Wansapanataym: Three-In-One	John Joseph	
2010	1DOL		One harmony singer
2010	Your Song Presents: Maling Akala	Karl Alda	First team-up with Kim Chiu
2008–present	ASAP	Guest performer	
2008	Pinoy Dream Academy	Himself	5th runner up
