= Anthems (Bugoy Drilon album) =

Bugoy Drilon 2026 album

Studio album by Bugoy Drilon
- Released: March 27, 2026
- Studios: Independent; 314 Studios
- Genres: R&B; soul
- Length: 26:17
- Languages: English; Tagalog
- Labels: Self-released; Distributed by 314 Studios
- Producers: Bugoy Drilon; NJ; esseca

Bugoy Drilon chronology
Bugoy: Decade (2018)	Anthems (2026)

Singles from Anthems
- 1. "Favorite Season" Released: November 28, 2025; 2. "Empty House" Released: January 30, 2026; 3. "Pilit Pinili" Released: March 20, 2026

Anthems is the fourth studio album by Filipino singer-songwriter Bugoy Drilon. It was released independently, through 314 Studios, on March 27, 2026, marking Drilon's first full-length album as an independent recording artist after his departure from the major-label system. It contains nine original compositions that blend contemporary pop, R&B, and Original Pilipino Music (OPM), with lyrical themes centered on love, resilience, hope, and personal growth.

All songs, including the singles "Favorite Season," "Empty House", and "Pilit Pinili", were written by Karl Ayn Escalona and co-written by Drilon, with production split between NJ and esseca; NJ also handled mixing and mastering.

Drilon has framed the record as a way of acknowledging the people behind his career, and has tied its more reflective songs to milestones from his eighteen years in the industry.

Anthems was launched at a media event in Pasig City on its release date, attended by Drilon's family, friends, and industry colleagues, where he performed selections from the album alongside a reworked version of his 2008 breakout single "Paano Na Kaya?"

== Background ==
The release of Anthems marked a new chapter in his career as an independent artist following a hiatus.

Anthems followed Nang Dahil Sa Pag-ibig (2011) as Drilon's fourth studio album, a gap during which he released the retrospective compilation Bugoy: Decade (2018) along with a number of standalone singles and duets.

Drilon said the new record took four years to complete and was developed with 314 Studios, who co-wrote and produced it before handling its distribution, allowing himself time to live through personal challenges to give the music genuine substance.

He has linked the album's reflective tone to personal milestones, including being able to buy his mother the house she had long wished for once his career allowed it, and has described the project as an expression of gratitude toward his family and the people who supported him early on.

'Anthems' is a collection of emotions of fear, love, hope and faith. Everyone can relate to the reality we are going through. I will send that kind of energy in power, that no matter how hard they went through, everything will be okay.

— Bugoy Drilon, ABS CBN article

== Release ==
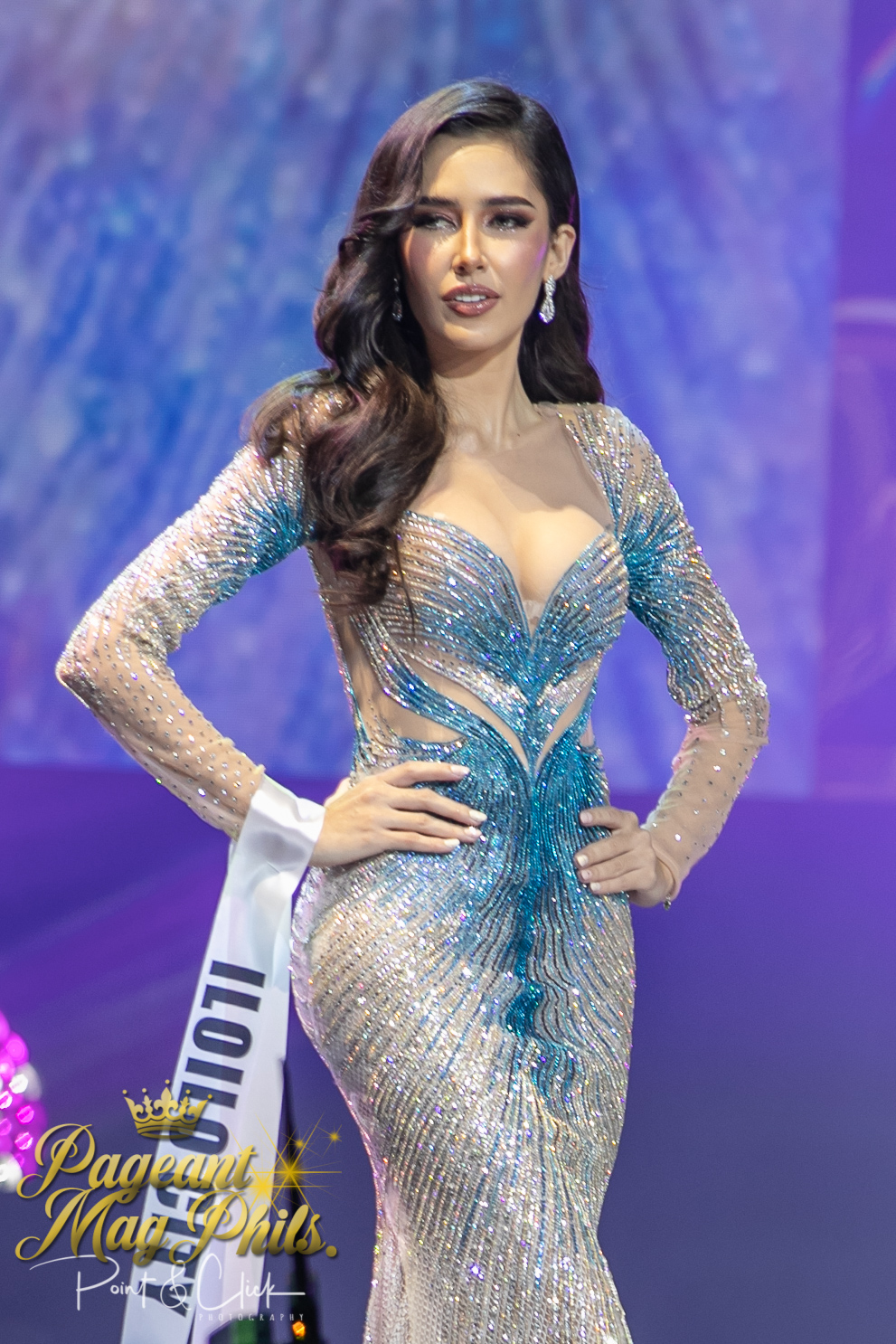
Beauty queen Karen Laurrie Mendoza featured in Drilon's music video of the single Favorite Season.

Anthems was released digitally on March 27, 2026 across major streaming platforms, distributed through 314 Studios. Three tracks preceded the full album as singles: "Favorite Season" in 2025, followed by "Empty House" and "Pilit Pinili" in early 2026.

The album was formally launched at a media event in Pasig City on its release date, drawing what one attendee described as a larger-than-expected turnout with a catered reception. Guests included family, friends, and industry colleagues, among them singer-actress Gigi De Lana, who praised Drilon's performance at the event. During the launch, Drilon performed several album tracks, including "Empty House," as well as a reimagined arrangement of his 2008 hit "Paano Na Kaya?" He has said he hopes his new independence will allow him to stage his first solo concert since debuting in 2008.

== Singles ==
"Favorite Season" was released on November 28, 2025. The music video was released on Drilon's YouTube channel on December 5, 2025, featuring Karen Laurrie Mendoza, a beauty queen from Iloilo.

The second single, "Empty House", was released on January 30, 2026.

The third single, "Pilit Pinili", was released on March 20, 2026.

== Performances ==
Drilon performed "Kapit" on the Wish 107.5 Bus. The track explores remaining steadfast in love through adversity.

On June 28, 2026, Drilon performed his single "Habang Buhay" during the finale of Music Travel Love's Philippine tour at the New Frontier Theater in Manila.

Drilon performed "Pilit Pinili" at Barangay LS FM 97.1 radio, audio streamed on its YouTube channel, on July 25, 2026.

== Track listing ==
Anthems track listing
No.	Title	Writer(s)	Producer(s)	Length
1.	"Empty House"	Bugoy Drilon; Karl Ayn Escalona	NJ	2:27
2.	"Favorite Season"	Drilon; Escalona	esseca; NJ	2:21
3.	"One Call Away"	Drilon; Escalona	esseca; NJ	3:03
4.	"Habang Buhay"	Drilon; Escalona	esseca; NJ	2:55
5.	"Oras"	Drilon; Escalona	esseca; NJ	2:59
6.	"Pilit Pinili"	Drilon; Escalona	Escalona; NJ	2:10
7.	"Natagpuan"	Drilon; Escalona	esseca; NJ	3:10
8.	"Lahat ng Kailangan"	Drilon; Escalona	esseca; NJ	3:20
9.	"Kapit"	Drilon; Escalona	esseca; NJ	3:52
Total length:				26:17

== Credits and personnel ==
- Bugoy Drilon - lead vocals, co-writer (all tracks)
- Karl Ayn Escalona - composition and lyrics (all tracks), producer (track 6)
- esseca - producer (except track 1)
- NJ - producer (track 1, 3, and 6), mixing engineer (all tracks), mastering engineer (all tracks)
- 314 Studios - distribution

== Release history ==
Release history and formats for Anthems
Region	Date	Format	Label	Ref
Various	March 27, 2026	Digital download; streaming	Independent; 314 Studios	
