= Bugoy Drilon =

Filipino singer (born 1990)

- Born: Jay Bogayan; January 1, 1990 (age 36); Ocampo, Camarines Sur, Philippines
- Genres: OPM; Pinoy pop; R&B; ballad; reggae
- Occupations: Singer; songwriter; recording artist
- Instrument: Vocals
- Years active: 2008–present
- Labels: Star Music; Tarsier Records; Life's Purpose Music Group; 314 Studios
- Member of: Tres Kantos; BuDaKhel
- Awards: Awit Awards 2009: People's Choice Best Performance by a Male Recording Artist; PMPC Star Award 2009: New Male Recording Artist of the Year; Wish 107.5 Music Awards 2020: Diamond Wishclusive Elite Circle Award

TikTok information
- Page: Bugoy Drilon
- Followers: 383.8K

YouTube information
- Channel: Bugoy Drilon
- Genre: Music
- Subscribers: 626K
- Views: 79 million
- Last updated: July 18, 2026

Jay Bogayan (born January 1, 1990), known professionally as Bugoy Drilon is a Filipino singer, songwriter, and recording artist. He rose to national prominence in 2008 as the first runner-up on the second season of the ABS-CBN reality talent competition Pinoy Dream Academy (PDA). Following his televised breakthrough, Drilon launched a commercial recording career under Star Records, now Star Music, propelled by his debut hit single "Paano Na Kaya," composed by Ryan Cayabyab. The song earned widespread airplay and established him as a prominent male balladeer in Original Pilipino Music (OPM).

Throughout his career, Drilon developed a versatile vocal repertoire spanning pop, contemporary R&B, soul, and reggae. He gained significant international attention through his live performances on the Wish 107.5 Bus, particularly his reggae-style cover of Matisyahu's "One Day", which surpassed 100 million views on YouTube and earned him a Diamond Wishclusive Elite Circle Award. Alongside his solo career, Drilon has participated in several high-profile collaborations, winning the 2016 celebrity contest series We Love OPM as part of the vocal trio Tres Kantos, and co-founding the R&B supergroup BuDaKhel alongside Daryl Ong and Michael Pangilinan.

Over nearly two decades in the music industry, Drilon has received multiple accolades, including Awit Awards, Box Office Entertainment Awards, and several PMPC Star Awards for Music. In his later career, he transitioned into independent music distribution and international touring, holding solo and joint concert runs across North America, Australia, and Asia. His work on film soundtracks includes "Ulan" for The Boy Foretold by the Stars (2020), and he has continued to produce independent R&B and reggae releases into 2026.

Drilon released his fifth studio album Anthems on March 27, 2026.

== Early life ==
Bugoy Drilon was born on January 1, 1990 in Ocampo, Camarines Sur, in the Bicol region. His father was a farmer while his mother was a barangay employee. He is the third in a brood of six, and the only son in the family.

To help fund his early education, Drilon began working at a young age, taking on menial labor to earn additional money such as selling peanuts, polvorón, donuts and sampalok. He was accepted as a scholar at the Universidad de Santa Isabel in Naga City pursuing Food Service Institutional Management while working as a canteen dishwasher, floor sweeper, and library assistant but gave up school to pursue a career in show business.

While in college, Drilon met friends from Days with the Lord (DWTL), a popular Catholic weekend retreat in the Philippines meant for high school and college students. The retreat helps young people grow in their faith and make friends. His friends who usually hear him sing at the canteen supported him during his initial auditions to the reality singing contest.

Drilon drew his music influence from listening to and singing songs of Willy Garte, Tom Jones, Engelbert Humperdinck when he was a kid, and later Brian McKnight and Boyz II Men.

== Career ==
=== 2008: Pinoy Dream Academy ===
==== Audition ====
In 2008, Drilon's DWTL friends urged him to audition for Pinoy Dream Academy (PDA), a reality singing contest by ABS-CBN, at a mall in Naga City, providing him with clothes and bus fare. During his initial audition process for PDA, the organizers gave him a pass by letting him sign up to an already closed registration and nearly being redirected to Pinoy Big Brother (PBB) auditions, but ultimately securing a slot for PDA and improvising his required registration photo by cutting it out from his school ID.

Drilon performed Guy Sebastian's "Angels Brought Me Here" as his audition piece, and waited months for a call back. On June 14, 2008, Drilon appeared during the season premiere of PDA, dubbed as "The Farmer's Son," and as one of the show's scholars, to be trained by the faculty who will serve as mentors, namely, Ryan Cayabyab (Headmaster), Joey Reyes (Media Performance Mentor), Kitchy Molina (Overall Voice Mentor), and Monet Silvestre (Voice Mentor). After the rigorous process and besting over 10,000 people who auditioned worldwide, Drilon eventually got accepted and lived with fellow scholars inside the Academy, which was also the PBB house, for three months from June to September, until contestants are eliminated by a combination of public text votes and scores from the mentors and judges.

After facing the mentors Cayabyab and Reyes on his audition video, Drilon stated, "Because of this, many will be able to hear my voice. Not just the carabao and the grass, but real people. Those who will admire me one day."

==== Name change ====
During the final week of Pinoy Dream Academy season 2 in 2008, Jay Bogayan officially adopted the stage name Bugoy Drilon. The academy's media mentor, director Jose Javier Reyes, initiated the rebranding to improve Bogayan's mainstream appeal, replacing his awkward-sounding surname with a combination of his familiar nickname, Bugoy, and his maternal maiden name, Drilon. For similar marketing purposes, Reyes also modified the screen names of fellow top scholars Laarni Losala and Van Pojas, officially introducing them as Laarni Lozada and Van Roxas, respectively.

==== Result ====
At the Grand Dream Night finals held at the Cuneta Astrodome on September 13, 2008, Drilon finished as first runner-up behind winner Laarni Lozada. Lozada garnered 651,696 text votes or 35.21 percent of the votes, while Drilon scored 549,760 text votes or 29.70 percent of the votes. Drilon won a cash prize of ₱500,000. His placement led to a recording contract with Star Records, the music label of ABS-CBN.

On October 4, 2008, Drilon received his Most Promising Male Performer Award given by the Asian Star Entertainment Awards held at Mandarin Suites, Gateway Mall, Cubao, Quezon City.

=== 2009: Paano Na Kaya? ===
In less than six months after PDA, Drilon released his debut album Paano Na Kaya? produced by Star Records. The 12-track album featured six songs alongside their respective minus-one instrumental tracks. The album's lead single, "Muli," which was composed by Vehnee Saturno, achieved a level of success comparable to Drilon's another hit, "Paano Na Kaya?," the latter being a chart-topper and being played on radios while they were still inside the PDA house. Drilon recalled that during PDA, he was listening to a borrowed portable music player with a built-in radio when he happened to tune into a station playing "Paano Na Kaya?" and heard the announcer declare it the number one song. "Muli" was originally sung by Rodel Naval, and Drilon's version was listed by Inquirer's Pop! Culture as one of the best cover songs by OPM artists, and on July 19, 2009, the album was awarded a gold record plaque.

Composed by Ryan Cayabyab, "Paano Na Kaya?" became one of the most frequently requested OPM songs on the airwaves and consistently secured the top position on numerous radio hit charts in 2008. The same song was also included in the compilation album Scholars Sing Cayabyab (2008) where it first appeared, featuring tracks composed by Cayabyab and performed by the top scholars of PDA season 2.

At the 1st WAKI OPM Music Awards held on April 25, 2009 at the SM Mall of Asia Music Hall, Drilon took home two awards out of three nominations namely Male Vocalist of 2008 and Senti Hit of the Year for the song "Paano Na Kaya?", while also nominated as Breakout Star of 2008.

Drilon won the New Male Recording Artist of the Year (Most Promising Singer) at the 40th Box Office Entertainment Awards by the Guillermo Mendoza Memorial Scholarship Foundation, Inc. (GMMSFI) on June 21, 2009 held at the Carlos P. Romulo Auditorium, RCBC Plaza, Makati City.

Following the song's success, it became a theme song of the 2010 film Paano Na Kaya, which starred Kim Chiu and Gerald Anderson.

At the 1st PMPC Star Awards for Music held on October 29, 2009, at the Skydome in SM North EDSA, Drilon tied with Jmore for the New Male Recording Artist award, and another nomination for "Paano Na Kaya?" as Song of the Year.

=== 2010: Bugoy Drilon second album ===
Building on the success of his 2008 debut, Drilon released a self-titled second album in 2010, led by the single "Hindi Na Bale," a revival of a song originally popularized by singer Jessa Zaragosa launched on April 4, 2010 on ASAP XV. Produced by Star Records, the album featured a collection of romantic OPM tracks, spearheaded by the lead single "Hindi Na Bale" composed by Jimmy Antiporda, alongside notable tracks like "Dahil Tanging Ikaw" and "Lumayo Ka Man Sa Akin." "Hindi Na Bale" served as the official soundtrack for the 2010 ABS-CBN television series Tanging Yaman.

On the May 16, 2010 episode of the ABS-CBN variety show Sharon, Drilon performed 1970s hit songs alongside host Sharon Cuneta and musician Nyoy Volante to explore musical genres outside his usual sentimental style.

On September 30, 2010, Drilon took home two awards from the 23rd Awit Awards, with the digital categories under ABS-CBN Interactive Award for Most Downloaded Artist of 2009 and Most Downloaded Song of 2009 for "Muli."

=== 2011-2012: Nang Dahil sa Pag-Ibig ===
On March 22, 2011, Drilon released his studio album Nang Dahil Sa Pag-Ibig through ABS-CBN Film Productions, Inc., featuring five new original tracks alongside their instrumental versions and three previously released songs. The title-track "Nang Dahil sa Pag-ibig" was composed by Larry Hermoso, and originally released by Tootsie Guevarra in 2000.

Drilon performed during the opening number at ASAP 2012 as ABS-CBN Star Magic celebrated its 20th anniversary. Entertainment reports highlighted him as one of Star Magic's key chart-topping male vocalists during the agency's grand anniversary showcase.

On October 6, 2011, during the 3rd PMPC Star Awards for Music, Drilon was nominated as Male Pop Artist of the Year, and a Pop Album of the Year Nomination for "Nang Dahil sa Pag-Ibig".

In December 2011, Drilon was featured as a special guest performer alongside other local musical artists at the week-long MBC National Choral Competition held at the Star City complex in Pasay City.

In 2012, the song "Huwag Ka Lang Mawawala" by Drilon and Liezl Garcia was included as the third track in the official soundtrack of the ABS-CBN television series Walang Hanggan.

On September 26, 2012, Drilon was featured alongside other artists in the Tambayan 101.9 Live Concert held at the University of the East (UE) Theater as part of the UE's 66th anniversary celebration.

At the 25th Awit Awards, held November 27, 2012, Drilon earned the i-Gateway Mobile Philippines Inc. award for Most Downloaded Song for 2011, for the song "Nang Dahil sa Pag-Ibig."

=== 2013-2014: Himig Handog ===
Himig Handog 2013 finals night poster

In March 2013, Drilon was one of the performing serenaders for the star-studded, fairytale-themed 18th birthday celebration of ABS-CBN actress Julia Montes.

At the fifth Himig Handog finals night held at the SM Mall of Asia Arena, Drilon performed as the interpreter for the finalist song "Pwede Bang Ako Na Lang Ulit." The track was featured alongside 11 other compositions selected from 2,500 worldwide entries during the multimedia competition. The song describes the hope of restarting a failed relationship, and serves as an anthem for individuals who want to be loved by their former partner one last time.

At the Himig Handog P-Pop Love Songs 2014 finals night held on September 28 at the Araneta Coliseum, Drilon served as the interpreter for the finalist song "Umiiyak ang Puso." The track, which was composed by Rolando Azor, competed alongside 14 other entries in the ABS-CBN multimedia songwriting competition's sixth iteration. KZ Tandingan's interpretation of "Mahal Ko o Mahal Ako" won the grand prize.

=== 2016: We Love OPM ===
As a member of the trio Tres Kantos mentored by Erik Santos, Drilon together with Jovit Baldivino and Dominador Aviola won the grand championship of We Love OPM: The Grand Celebrity Sing-offs on July 17, 2016, following a performance of Ryan Cayabyab's song "Nais Ko" that secured 80.45% of the public vote.

In 2016, Drilon achieved further prominence when his live performance of "One Day" on the Wish 107.5 Bus went viral, accumulating 38 million views in its first month. The performance attracted the attention of the song's original artist, Matisyahu, who publicly praised Drilon and invited him to perform alongside him in the United States. Drilon and Matisyahu performed "One Day" during the Avila Beach Music Festival.

During the fifth annual ASOP Music Festival Grand Finals held on November 7, 2016, at the Araneta Coliseum, Drilon served as an interpreter for the competition. He performed the song "God Will Always Make A Way," composed by Glenn Bawa and Ronald Calpis, which was one of twelve entries competing for the Song of the Year title, and eventually won first runner up.

=== 2017: Reggae fusion era ===
In January 2017, following the positive public reception of his "One Day" cover, Drilon announced his intention to transition from R&B to reggae fusion, which led to preliminary discussions with Star Music's Jonathan Manalo regarding a potential reggae-infused album.

Drilon was a recipient of two nominations at the Wish Music Awards held on January 16, 2017 at SMART-Araneta Coliseum for Best Wishclusive Performance By A Male Artist and Wish Male Artist of the Year, while bagging the Bronze Wishclusive Elite Circle for 10 million views Award.

During the September 23, 2017 Manila concert of Matisyahu at the SM Skydome, Drilon joined him on stage to perform "One Day" alongside a rendition of "No Woman No Cry."

=== 2018-2019: Decade ===
Bugoy Drilon's One Day, One Decade concert poster in 2018

On January 15, 2018, during the 3rd Wish Music Awards held at the Smart Araneta Coliseum, Bugoy was once again nominated for Wish Artist of the Year, losing to Morissette, but took home the Silver Wishclusive Elite Circle for 25 million views Award for the song "One Day."

In May 2018, Drilon's song "Air Tonight" was nominated in the "Best World Music Recording" category at the 31st Awit Awards.

In 2018, Drilon alongside Michael Pangilinan, Daryl Ong, and Katrina Velarde, received international attention after their collaborative cover of "One Sweet Day" went viral on YouTube Philippines, accumulating over one million views in less than a week after it was posted and was later released as a single. The vocal trio of Drilon, Pangilinan and Ong called BuDaKhel, a portmanteau of their names, was formed over a simple jam session while singing "I Swear."

On September 25, Drilon headlined his first major solo concert, titled "Bugoy: One Day, One Decade," at the Kia Theater in Araneta Center, presented by Star Music and Wish 107.5. The three-hour concert was to commemorate his tenth year in the music industry with featured guest appearances by fellow PDA scholars Cris Pastor, Hansen Nichols, Miguel Mendoza, and Liezel Garcia, alongside artists Yeng Constantino, KZ Tandingan, Erik Santos, Klarisse De Guzman, and BuDaKhel members Ong and Pangilinan.

On October 26, 2018, Drilon joined Jona, Klarisse de Guzman, and fellow BuDaKhel members for Hugot Friday: Your Ultimate Break Up Playlist concert held at Al Nasr Leisureland, Oud Metha, Dubai, UAE.

During the 4th Wish Music Awards held last January 15, 2019, Drilon was presented with his nomination for Wishclusive Pop Performance of the Year for "Namo."

Drilon was featured alongside the band 6cyclemind and comedian Teri Onor as a performer at a free public concert hosted by Camarines Sur governor Migz Villafuerte on January 19, 2019 at Pili Central School.

Drilon was featured as part of the lineup for the inaugural 1MX Singapore music festival presented by ABS-CBN. Held on May 26, 2019 at the SCAPE Playspace in Orchard Link, the event marked the festival's first expansion into Singapore following a previous staging in Abu Dhabi.

Drilon was featured as a headline performer during the inaugural 2019 Las Islas Music Festival, which toured multiple venues across the Visayas region, including Bacolod, Iloilo, and Aklan. Organized by talent management firm 6SK to promote OPM in provincial communities, the festival showcased Drilon alongside fellow artists such as Daryl Ong, Sam Mangubat, and Claudia Barretto to bring live entertainment to audiences outside major metropolitan centers. The tour's schedule ran from October 25 at the Bacolod Panaad Stadium, October 26 at the Iloilo Barotac Nuevo Plaza, to October 27 at the Aklan Sports Complex.

During the 5th Wish Music Awards held on January 19, 2020 at the SM Mall of Asia Area, Drilon was awarded the Diamond Wishclusive Elite Circle (for 100 Million Views) Award for the song "One Day."

At the 11th PMPC Star Awards for Music held on January 23, 2020 in Skydome, SM North Edsa, Quezon City, Drilon was nominated under four categories namely Pop Album of the Year, Folk/Country Recording of the Year, Novelty Song of the Year, and Novelty Artist of the Year.

On July 30, 2020, Drilon released the single entitled "Impossible Love," and noted that the project marked a significant milestone for him as he composed the lyrics entirely in English.

=== 2021-2024: International tours and collaborations ===
BAD Boys of R&B US concert tour poster in 2023

On January 8, 2021, Drilon collaborated with British-Filipino music producer Moophs on the tropical-bass track "Tied." The song featured Drilon's signature reggae style, juxtaposing a sunny melody against lyrics that depict a romantic relationship on the verge of ending.

On March 21, 2021, during the live streaming of the 11th edition of the Himig Handog songwriting competition, the song “Kahit na Masungit” composed by John Francis and Jayson Franz Pasicolan won as the Second Best Song, where Drilon sang as interpreter during its live performance.

On July 9, 2021, Drilon released the island pop track "Shipwrecked," a collaboration with music producer Moophs that explores the concept of expressing pure love and finding contentment with a partner away from societal constraints, while its accompanying lyric video highlights local landscapes to help promote Philippine tourism.

On July 14, 2021, Drilon was one of the performers in the free online concert presented by MVP Group to mark its chairman's 75th birthday where he sang "Magsimula Ka." In the midst of the pandemic, the performances were digitally broadcast across the group's various social media platforms.

In October 2021, Drilon collaborated with acoustic rocker Luigi Seno and producer DJ Fredy Muks on the Afrobeat-infused track "Real Friends." Drilon recorded his parts from Cebu for a cross-continental music video that integrated soulful harmonies with laidback instrumentation.

During the 37th PMPC Star Awards for Movies held on February 12, 2023 via virtual award ceremony, his song "Ulan" was nominated for Indie Movie Original Theme Song of the Year for the movie The Boy Foretold By The Stars.

During the March 26, 2023 episode of The Clash, singer Drilon opened the show alongside Thea Astley with a duet mashup, performing Bruno Mars' "When I Was Your Man" alongside Astley's rendition of Miley Cyrus' "Flowers."

In October 2023, Drilon joined fellow artists Angeline Quinto and Daryl Ong as a special guest on the North American leg of Quinto's "10Q" concert tour, delivering a series of soulful performances across cities like Honolulu, San Diego, and Houston to entertain and connect with overseas Filipino communities.

While in the United States, Drilon co-headlined the "B.A.D. Boys of R&B" concert tour—a title playing on their initials—alongside Daryl Ong from October 13 to November 4, 2023, performing across cities in Nevada and California.

In late 2023, Drilon collaborated with the international music act Music Travel Love Drilon was in Los Angeles, California, concluding the United States concert tours for "10Q" and "B.A.D. Boys of R&B," he was discovered via a Facebook video by Canadian musicians Bob and Clint Moffatt of Music Travel Love. After the brothers contacted him through an Instagram direct message, Drilon met with the duo to record a series of highly successful acoustic covers, eventually joining them as a special guest on their 2024 Asian tour. Their rendition of "Nothings Gonna Change My Love for you" had over 42 million views on Youtube and 19 million views on Facebook. Further features with the duo followed, including "That's the Way It Is" (2024) and "Forever Young" (2025).

During the 69th FAMAS Awards, held last December 13, 2021, Drilon was nominated in the category Best Original Song for his rendition of the song "Ulan" from the film The Boy Foretold by the Stars.

At the 2nd Southeast Asian Premier Business and Achiever Awards held on December 8, 2024 at Winford Resort and Casino Manila Ballroom Halls 1-3, Drilon was given the award Premier Singer of the Year.

=== 2026: Anthems ===
In the March 1, 2026 episode of All-Out Sundays, Drilon, John Rex, and Jong Madaliday performed “Paano Na Kaya,” “Muli,” and “Favorite Season.”

Following a years-long hiatus, Drilon released his fourth studio album Anthems on March 27, 2026, marking his first release as an independent artist, and took nearly four years to complete. Anthems is an R&B and soul-infused album with nine tracks and his comeback album after seven years. Drilon stated that the album focuses on personal loss, life's ups and downs, and self-healing, designed to serve as a "safe space" for listeners. Drilon adopted a more personal and honest approach in creating the album to reflect an evolution from his initial public image. Drilon is now an independent artist, releasing through 314 Studios.

During the 17th PMPC Star Awards for Music held last June 22, 2026 at Teatrino Promenade, Greenhills, San Juan City, Drilon was nominated under the category R&B Male Artist of the Year, though the award ultimately went to Kris Lawrence.

On June 28, 2026, Drilon performed his single "Habang Buhay" alongside covers of George Benson's "Nothing's Gonna Change My Love for You" and Matisyahu's "One Day" during the finale of Music Travel Love's Philippine tour at the New Frontier Theater in Manila.

== Personal life ==
Drilon's life story was featured on ABS-CBN's weekly drama special Maalaala Mo Kaya on its October 11, 2008 episode, with actor-singer Mark Bautista portraying Drilon. Written by Ruel Montanez and directed by Ruel Bayani, the story centered on his relationship with his father Elmer and his eventual journey toward forgiveness for their past family conflicts.

Drilon addressed media and public scrutiny during a September 2008 press conference by clarifying speculations about his gender identity and physical appearance, while also dismissing rumors of animosity toward PDA grand winner Laarni Lozada.

Drilon stated that he is a fan of Vhong Navarro and Adam Sandler.

During his 21st birthday celebration, Drilon expressed his commitment to prioritizing his entertainment career to save money for his future, while balancing his mother Myrna's wishes for him to eventually complete his education once his schedule and finances permit.

Outside entertainment, Drilon has established himself as an entrepreneur through local investments. His business portfolio includes financial backing for a community fitness gym, which serves as an alternative stream of income, and the establishment of a local water refilling station designed to provide ongoing financial support for his extended family.

In August 2025, Drilon fulfilled a long-standing promise to his mother by gifting his family a new home, which he described as a symbol of perseverance and gratitude for his music career, marking a milestone seventeen years after rising to fame.

From an early age, Drilon envisioned his musical future through a childhood memory of a cornfield swaying in the wind, an image he later recognized as a metaphor for a live audience listening to his performances. Reflecting on his career, he views his presence in the industry as a blessing and the fulfillment of a higher purpose.

== Artistry and vocal style ==
Drilon considers himself a perfectionist. He emphasized that he creates music based on genuine, raw experiences rather than just chasing current trends. He sees his work as an artist as more than just personal satisfaction; for him, music is a way to deeply connect with listeners and inspire them, rather than simply provide entertainment. This ability to connect emotionally with the audience is a well-known feature of his performances.

Throughout his career, Drilon has expanded his vocal and musical range by experimenting with R&B across various genres including pop and reggae, shaping a style grounded in the lessons learned from his past experiences.

== Discography ==
Drilon built a recording career initially under Star Records (now Star Music), scoring several radio and digital-download hits and has since transitioned into an independent artist.

=== Studio albums ===
- Paano Na Kaya? (2008)
- Bugoy Drilon (2010)
- Nang Dahil Sa Pag-Ibig (2011)
- Bugoy: Decade (2018)
- Anthems (2026)

=== Compilation and collaborative albums ===
- Scholars Sing Cayabyab (2008)
- Sa 'Yo Lamang (2010)
- Walang Hanggan (Original Motion Picture Soundtrack) (2012)

=== Songs used as film/television series soundtrack ===
- "Paano Na Kaya?" in Paano Na Kaya (2010)
- "Pagkat Mahal Kita" in Kung Tayo'y Magkakalayo (2010)
- "Nang Dahil sa Pag-Ibig" in Minsan Lang Kita Iibigin (2011)

== Concerts ==
In addition to his music career, Drilon has appeared on several television programs and maintains an active presence in the entertainment industry through live performances and social media.

Year	Name	Notes	Ref.
2008	Pinoy Dream Academy Season 2 Grand Dreamers Night	September 13–14, 2008; Cuneta Astrodome, Pasay City, Metro Manila; ABS-CBN / Endemol; Co-headlined with top PDA scholars (Laarni Lozada, Liezel Garcia, etc.); Bugoy was named 2nd Star Dreamer	
2017	Avila Beach Music Festival	Matisyahu joined by Bugoy Drilon performing "One Day"	
2017	Matisyahu Live in Manila	September 23, 2017; SM Skydome, SM City North EDSA, Quezon City; DMC Entertainment / Wish 107.5; Featured Guest: Performed a duet of "One Day" live with international reggae artist Matisyahu following his viral Wish Bus cover.	
2018	Bugoy: One Day, One Decade (10th Anniversary Concert)	September 25, 2018; Kia Theatre (now New Frontier Theater), Cubao, Quezon City; Wish 107.5 (in partnership with Star Music, Star Events, UNTV, & Radyo La Verdad); Solo Headliner: His 10th-anniversary milestone concert.; Guests included Erik Santos, Yeng Constantino, KZ Tandingan, and Klarisse De Guzman.	
2018	Hugot Friday: Your Ultimate Break Up Playlist	Date: 26 October 2018; Venue: Al Nasr Leisureland, Oud Metha, Dubai, UAE; Producer: Volcano Events; Additional info: Featured performer alongside Jona (Jonalyn Viray), Klarisse de Guzman, and fellow BuDaKhel members	
2022	10Q: Angeline Quinto & BuDaKhel (US Tour)	September 16, 2022; Copernicus Center, Chicago, IL, USA (and selected US tour stops); Excel Productions LLC; Co-Headliner: Joint US concert tour with Angeline Quinto, Daryl Ong, and Michael Pangilinan.	
2022	10Q: Angeline Quinto & BuDaKhel Live in Manila	November 12, 2022; Newport Performing Arts Theater, Newport World Resorts, Pasay City; AQ Prime Music / Newport World Resorts / ABS-CBN Events; Co-Headliner: Celebration concert co-headlined alongside Angeline Quinto, Daryl Ong, and Michael Pangilinan.	
2023	BuDaKhel Live in Cebu	September 23, 2023; Mandaue City Sports and Cultural Complex, Mandaue City, Cebu; Local Promoters / Creative Sound Events; Co-Headliner: Trio performance as BuDaKhel with Daryl Ong and Michael Pangilinan.	
2024	Soulful Voices: Bugoy Drilon Canada Tour (feat. Sam Mangubat)	Date/Venue: 26 October 2024 – Toronto Pavilion, North York, Toronto, Canada — held; Producer: not specified (ticketed via Powerhouse Dreams Entertainment); Additional info: The Toronto date was billed as Drilon's Canadian solo concert debut; opening act was local group "The Champions" (Dong D., Bevs, Marlon)	
2025	The Power of 3: Live in Sydney	Date: 5 July 2025; Venue: Sydney Coliseum Theatre, Sydney, Australia; Producer: not specified in sources found; Additional info: Co-billed with Marcelito Pomoy and Lyca Gairanod	
2026	Music Travel Love Live in Manila	June 28, 2024; New Frontier Theater, Cubao, Quezon City; Concert Republic; Featured Special Guest: Joined Canadian brothers Bob and Clint Moffatt (Music Travel Love) onstage to perform acoustic renditions.	

== Filmography ==
=== Television ===
Year	Title	Role	Genre	Notes	Ref.
2008	Pinoy Dream Academy; Season 2	Himself	Reality	Bugoy Drilon's first TV appearance where he competed as a scholar for title Grand Star Dreamer.; Aired: June 14, 2008 – September 14, 2008; Network: ABS-CBN	
2010	Sharon	Himself	Variety	Hosted by Sharon Cuneta; Aired: May 16, 2010; Network: ABS-CBN	
2016	We Love OPM	Himself	Reality	A reality/contest series where singers are asked give a fresh take on Filipino hits; Bugoy Drilon was part of Tres Kantos group together with Jovit Baldivino and Dominador Aviola; Aired: May 14, 2016 – July 16, 2016	
2023	The Clash	Himself	Singing Reality	A reality talent competition show; Aired: March 26, 2023; Network: GMA	
2026	All Out Sundays	Himself	Variety	Singing variety show; Aired: March 1, 2026; Network: GMA	

== Awards and nominations ==
Award (Note: Awards, festivals, honors and other miscellaneous organizations are listed in alphabetical order.)	Year (Note: Indicates the year of ceremony. Each year is linked to the article about the awards held that year, wherever possible.)	Category	Work	Result	Ref.
Asian Star Entertainment Awards	2008	Most Promising Male Performer	Himself	Won	
A Song of Praise Music Festival	2016	Song of the Year – First Runner Up	"God Will Always Make A Way"; Interpreted by: Bugoy Drilon; Composers: Ronald Calpis and Glenn Bawa	Won	
Awit Awards	2009	Song of the Year	"Paano Na Kaya?" credited to songwriter: Ryan Cayabyab	Nominated	
Awit Awards	2009	Best Performance by a Male Recording Artist	"Paano Na Kaya?"	Nominated	
Awit Awards	2009	Best Performance by a New Male Recording Artist	"Paano Na Kaya?"	Nominated	
Awit Awards	2009	Best Ballad Recording	"Paano Na Kaya?"	Nominated	
Awit Awards	2009	People's Choice Best Performance by a Male Recording Artist	"Paano Na Kaya?"	Won	
Awit Awards	2009	People's Choice Best Performance by a New Male Recording Artist	"Paano Na Kaya?"	Nominated	
Awit Awards	2009	People's Choice Song of the Year	"Paano Na Kaya?"	Won	
Awit Awards	2010	Most Downloaded Song	"Muli"	Won	
Awit Awards	2010	Most Downloaded Artist	Himself	Won	
Awit Awards	2011	Most Downloaded Song	"Nang Dahil sa Pag-Ibig"	Won	
Awit Awards	2018	Best World Music Recording	"Air Tonight"	Nominated	
Box Office Entertainment Awards	2009	New Male Recording Artist of the Year (Most Promising Singer)	"Paano Na Kaya?"	Won	
FAMAS Awards	2021	Best Original Song	"Ulan" from the film The Boy Foretold by the Stars	Nominated	
PMPC Star Awards for Movies	2020	Indie Movie Original Theme Song of the Year	"Ulan" performed by Bugoy Drilon, composed by Jhaye Cura and Pau Protacio, arranged by Tbear Music ("The Boy Foretold By The Stars")	Nominated	
PMPC Star Awards for Music	2009	Song of the Year	"Paano Na Kaya?"; Performed by: Bugoy Drilon; Album: Paano Na Kaya? Composer: Ryan Cayabyab; Arranger: Arnold Buena; Star Records	Nominated	
PMPC Star Awards for Music	2009	New Male Recording Artist of the Year	Himself	Won	
PMPC Star Awards for Music	2011	Pop Album of the Year	"Nang Dahil sa Pag-Ibig"; Star Music	Nominated	
PMPC Star Awards for Music	2011	Male Pop Artist of the Year	Himself	Nominated	
PMPC Star Awards for Music	2020	Pop Album of the Year	Bugoy: Decade (2018); Star Music	Nominated	
PMPC Star Awards for Music	2020	Folk/Country Recording of the Year	"Kayumanggi"; Star Music	Nominated	
PMPC Star Awards for Music	2020	Novelty Song of the Year	"Namo"; Star Music	Nominated	
PMPC Star Awards for Music	2020	Novelty Artist of the Year	Himself	Nominated	
PMPC Star Awards for Music	2026	R&B Male Artist of the Year	"Hilom"	Nominated	
Southeast Asian Premier Business And Achiever Award	2024	Premier Singer of the Year	Himself	Won	
WAKI OPM Music Awards	2009	Male Vocalist of 2008	Himself	Won	
WAKI OPM Music Awards	2009	Senti Hit of the Year	"Paano Na Kaya?"	Won	
WAKI OPM Music Awards	2009	Breakout Star of 2008	Himself	Nominated	
Wish 107.5 Music Awards	2017	Best Wishclusive Performance By A Male Artist	"One Day"	Nominated	
Wish 107.5 Music Awards	2017	Wish Male Artist of the Year	Himself	Nominated	
Wish 107.5 Music Awards	2017	Bronze Wishclusive Elite Circle for 10 million views	"One Day"	Won	
Wish 107.5 Music Awards	2018	Silver Wishclusive Elite Circle for 25 million views	"One Day"	Won	
Wish 107.5 Music Awards	2018	Wish Artist of the Year	Himself	Nominated	
Wish 107.5 Music Awards	2019	Wishclusive Pop Performance of the Year	"Namo"	Nominated	
Wish 107.5 Music Awards	2020	Diamond Wishclusive Elite Circle Award for 100 million views	"One Day"	Won	
