= Scholars Sing Cayabyab =

2008 album of Ryan Cayabyab songs

- Album Cover

Compilation album by Pinoy Dream Academy (season 2) Top 10 Scholars and Yeng Constantino
- Released: 2008
- Recorded: 2008
- Genres: OPM, pop
- Languages: English, Tagalog, Taglish
- Label: Star Records

Scholars Sing Cayabyab is a compilation album of Ryan Cayabyab-composed songs performed by the Pinoy Dream Academy Season 2 top 10 scholars and the PDA Season 1 Grand Star Dreamer Yeng Constantino. The album was released in 2008 under Star Records.

The album is composed of eleven tracks that includes the songs "Paano Na Kaya", "Manalig Ka", "Limang Dipang Tao" and "Awit ng Pangarap".

== Track listing ==
1. "Paano Na Kaya" - Bugoy Drilon
2. "Manalig Ka" - Laarni Lozada
3. "Another Goodbye Song" - Van Roxas
4. "I'd Rather" - Liezel Garcia
5. "Hero" - Miguel Mendoza
6. "Limang Dipang Tao" - Apple Abarquez
7. "Ganun Ba" - Iñaki Ting
8. "Bakit Ganyan" - Cris Pastor
9. "Wala Kang Katulad" - Sen Nichols
10. "Narito Lang Ako" - Bunny Malunda
11. "Awit ng Pangarap" - Yeng Constantino
