= Music Travel Love =

Canadian musical duo

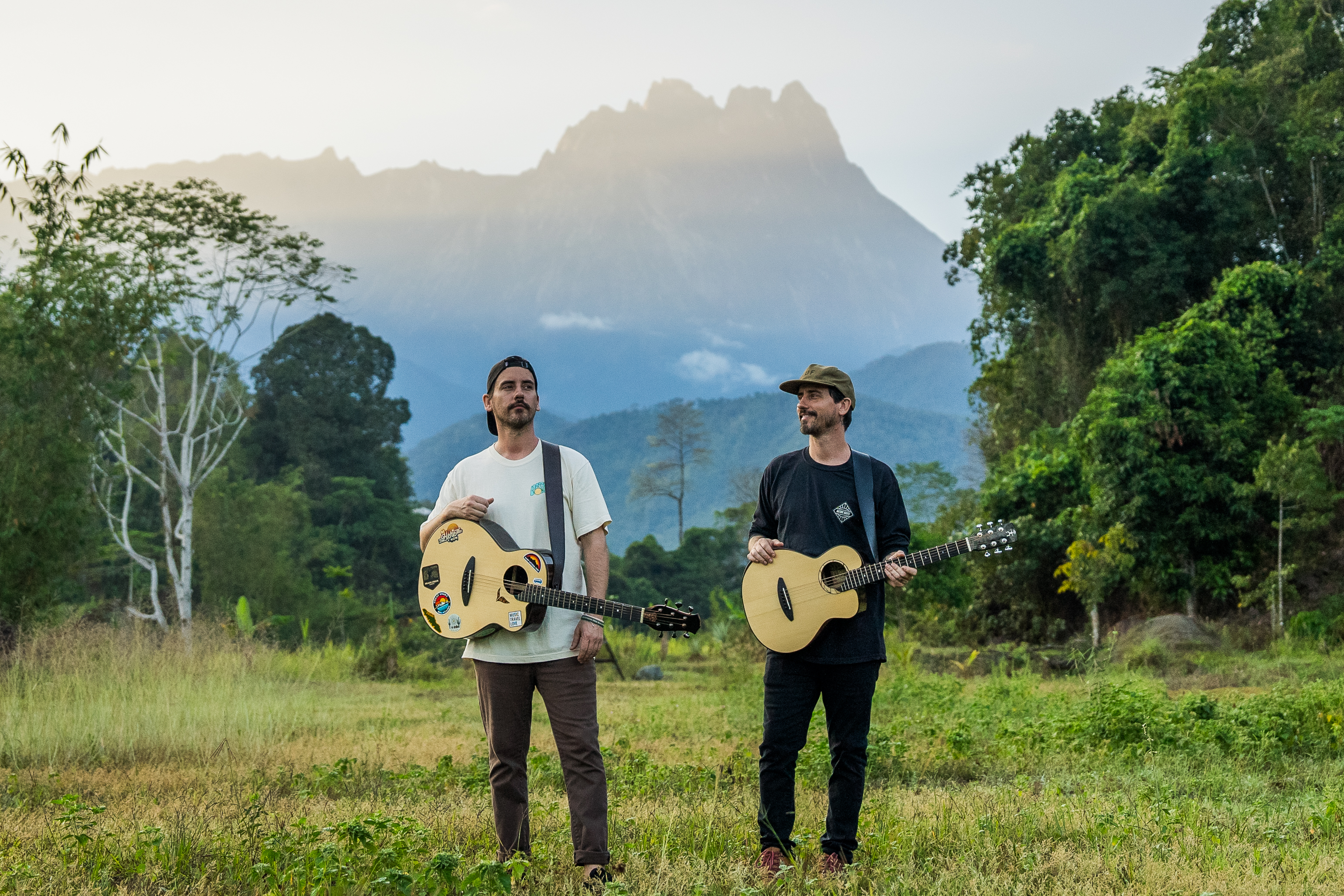
- MTL on Mount Kinabalu

Background information
- Origin: Faro, Yukon, Canada
- Genres: Pop; country; pop rock; alternative rock
- Years active: 2016–present
- Members: Clint Moffatt; Bob Moffatt
- Website: www.musictravellove.com

TikTok information
- Page: Music Travel Love
- Followers: 2.5 million

YouTube information
- Channel: Music Travel Love
- Genre: music
- Subscribers: 6.09 million
- Views: 2.8 billion
- Last updated: April 7, 2026

Music Travel Love is a Canadian musical duo consisting of two brothers out of a set of triplets, Bob and Clint Moffatt. The other triplet is their brother, Dave Moffatt, also a musician. They first rose to fame in the 1990s as members of the music group the Moffatts. In 2016, the brothers formed the duo Endless Summer, then later reformed as Music Travel Love in 2019.

== Early life ==
Bob and Clint, identical twins, were born on March 8, 1984, in Vancouver, British Columbia, Canada and their first home was Faro, Yukon. Canada. They are part of a set of triplets with their fraternal brother, Dave.

== Career ==
Music Travel Love began performing at the age of four years old as part of the band, the Moffatts which split in 2000. Together with their siblings, they were signed by Polydor Records where they recorded two albums and later in 1996, signed with EMI Electrola in Koln, Germany where they sold over six million records, having gold and platinum records in 32 countries.

In 2000, Clint and Bob formed the band Hydell. In 2005, they formed the short-lived duo Same Same signed to Sony BMG, then later returned to Nashville, to focus on songwriting and signed with Wrensong/Reynsong in 2010. They performed at the MTV Music Awards in 2006 with Britney Spears in Beijing. They formed the band Endless Summer and released two EPs and then a video in 2016. Their 2015 single "Goodbye Baby" made the top 20 on The Highway of Sirius XM. They released their latest EP, Happy 'N High shortly after. They later co-wrote the songs for Jimmy Rankin's Juno album, "Cool Car" off Jimmy Rankin's album Back Road Paradise and Done Runnin' by Chaley Rose.

In 2017, under the name of Endless Summer, they began filming music videos around the world. They are known for performing acoustic covers in scenic locations around the world, highlighting destinations like South East Asian beaches, North American mountains, and deserts in the Middle East. Their elder brother and producer, Scott Moffatt, won the 2020 Academy of Country Music Awards, Canadian Country Music Association Awards, and Country Music Association Awards for Producer of the Year. Their collaboration with Marsha Milan on "Islands in the Stream" in Sabah, Malaysia helped promote Sabah as a tourist destination. They have also filmed in places such as the UK, Bali, Vietnam, and Al Ain, UAE. In 2024, the duo embarked on a sold-out Southeast Asian tour, performing in cities such as Bangkok, Manila, Jakarta, Taiwan, Singapore and Kuala Lumpur. Their tour featured collaborations with local artists, which blended cultures and musical styles.

They have had 3 radio singles including Amen For Women and wrote songs for the television show, Nashville.

Their covers have included a rendition of "How Deep Is Your Love" with Anthony Uy. They have also collaborated with Mitch Rossell on "Then Again", Arqam Al Abri, Donia El-Hendi, Maya Mashhour and Suzan Sadek on "Stand by Me", "Nothing's Gonna Change My Love for You" with Bugoy Drilon and "I Want It That Way" with Francis Greg. They have also performed collaborations with their triplet brother Dave Moffatt. In 2023, they collaborated with 1990s soft rock band Michael Learns to Rock. In addition to their music projects, the brothers started a children's channel called "Music Travel Kids", have a clothing company NOEX (No Expectations) and launched a coffee company, Music Java Love.

== Discography ==
=== Albums ===
- Covering the World Vol. 1 (2019)
- Covering the World Vol. 2 (2019)
- Covering the World Vol. 3 (2020)
- Originals (2020)
- Covering the World 2021 (2022)
- Covering the World Vol. 4 (2024)
- Covering the World Vol. 5 (2024)
- Covering the World Vol. 6 (2024)

=== EP ===
- The EP (2016)
