= OPM (album) =

Compilation album by Sarah Geronimo
- Released: December 22, 2008
- Recorded: 2003–2008
- Genre: OPM
- Language: Filipino, Tagalog
- Label: VIVA
- Producer: Vic Del Rosario, Jr., Tony Ocampo, Vincent Del Rosario, Baby A. Gil, Guia Gil-Ferrer

Sarah Geronimo chronology
Just Me (2008)	OPM (2008)	Music and Me (2009)

Singles from OPM
- 1. "Ngayon, Bukas at Kailanman" Released: December 2008- 2012

OPM is the first ever compilation album by Filipino singer Sarah Geronimo, released on December 22, 2008 in the Philippines by VIVA Records. It consists of OPM songs that she has released, may it be a single, an album track or a soundtrack. In 2010, it has been certified Platinum by the Philippine Association of the Record Industry, selling 25,000 copies in the country.

== Track listing ==
No.	Title	Writer(s)	Arranger(s)	Length
1.	"Ngayon, Bukas at Kailanman" (theme Song From Baler)	Edith Gallardo, Louie Ocampo	Ocampo	4:25
2.	"Ikaw ang Aking Pangarap" (theme Song From Lobo)	Ogie Alcasid	Melvin Morallos	4:36
3.	"Kailangan Kita"	Ogie Alcasid	Mon Faustino	4:36
4.	"Kung Ako na Lang Sana"	Soc Villanueva	Nino Regalado	4:07
5.	"Minsan"	Edwin Marollano	Elmer Blancaflor	4:02
6.	"Ikaw"	Medwin Marfil	Regalado	4:55
7.	"Sa Iyo"	Jun Murillo	Regalado	3:36
8.	"Pers Lab"	Dennis Garcia	Noel Mendez	2:41
9.	"Miss"	Chuckie Dreyfus	Regalado	3:41
10.	"Lumingon Ka Lang"	Lito Camo	Ferdie Marquez	3:44
11.	"Kahit Na"	Dreyfus	Regalado	3:58
12.	"Pangarap na Bituin"	Willy Cruz	Faustino	3:49
13.	"Ibulong Sa Hangin"	Emil Pama	Alvin Nunez	4:14
14.	"Hanggang Kailan"	Alcasid	Nunez	4:15
15.	"Pangarap Ko ang Ibigin Ka"	Alcasid	Regalado	4:45
16.	"Bituing Walang Ningning"	Cruz	Homer Flores	4:55
17.	"Narito"	Alcasid	Mon Espia	3:36
18.	"Paano Kita Mapasasalamatan"	George Canseco	Nunez	4:14

== Personnel ==
Credits were taken from Titik Pilipino.

- ACNE (at Homme et Femme) - black dress
- Paul Basinillo - creative director
- Grace Castaneda - creative team, digital imaging
- Comme De Garcon - black and white dress
- Vic Del Rosario, Jr. - executive producer
- Vincent Del Rosario - executive producer
- Denim, Inc. - album concept and design, creative team
- Dittle - creative team, illustrations
- Sarah Geronimo - lead vocals
- Baby A. Gil - supervising producer
- Guia Gil-Ferrer - associate producer
- Mia Marigomen - creative team
- Joel Mendoza - recording, mixing and mastering
- Joy Mongado - creative team, digital imaging
- MG O. Mozo - A&R direction
- Tony Ocampo - executive producer
- Eric Pe Benito - styling
- Ronnie Salvacion - photography
- Cary Santiago - black and white gown
- Juan Sarte - hair and make-up

== Certifications ==
Country	Provider	Certification	Sales
Philippines	PARI	Platinum	25,000+
