= Laarni Lozada =

- Also known as: Laarni Lozada "The Ethereal Diva"
- Born: Laarnie R. Losala; Pasig, Philippines
- Genres: Pop, Ballad, Classical, Soul
- Occupations: Singer, Host, Model, Endorser
- Instrument: Vocals
- Years active: 2008–present
- Label: Star Music - 2008 to 2009
- Spouse: None
- Website: https://www.facebook.com/lozadalaarni

Laarnie Losala (born June 23), popularly known as Laarni Lozada, dubbed and recognized as The Philippines' Ethereal Diva, is a Filipino pop, ballad, classical, and soul singer, host, model and endorser. She is known as the Grand Star Dreamer of ABS-CBN Pinoy Dream Academy (Season 2), Philippine franchise of Endemol's Star Academy garnering a total of 651,696 votes on September 14, 2008.

== Biography ==
=== Early life ===
Laarni was born in Pasig to William and Nita Losala. The family moved to Isulan, Sultan Kudarat later on. She has six siblings.

Laarni was a consistent honor student from elementary to high school. When she was in Grade five, she worked at the local public market and at the family farm. When she was 15, she left Isulan for Manila. to pursue her education. An aunt from the US supported her in her studies at the School of Music of the Philippine Women's University. However, she decided to shift course from AB Music to BS Education, Major in English, when she realized that most of the music students in the school were from the upper strata of society. She feared that she lacked the eloquence to be part of that kind of milieu. Her musical talent, however, paved the way for her to become a university scholar while working as a student assistant of the school.

Laarni sang both for passion and for a living. She sang in different social functions, particularly in weddings, joined singing competitions, and accepted guestings. She became a runner-up in Sing Galing! on ABC-5. She won the Rotary Club Intercollegiate/University singing contest, besting 25 other contestants from different schools in Manila by rendering the patriotic anthem "Dakilang Lahi". She also won the National Grand Finals of the "Campus Idol" search by her rendition of "What Kind of Fool Am I?".

Laarni also joined the PWU Church chorale, the Ambassadors of Light, and the Malate Church Chorale. When she became part of the Coro de San Sebastian, she got the opportunity to sing together with said choral group with the Philippine Madrigal Singers in a Madrigal et al. concert.

At 16 years old, Laarni sang at the Calesa Bar, she had the opportunity to get musical pointers from the bar's musical director, Rudy Francisco.

Her musical influences include The Legendary Iconic Musical Queen: Celine Dion, Whitney Houston, Mariah Carey, Charlotte Church, Regine Velasquez, Sheryn Regis, Lea Salonga, Lani Misalucha, Charice Pempengco, Sarah Geronimo, Gary Valenciano, Martin Nievera, and Jed Madela.

=== Education ===
She graduated from Philippine Women's University in Taft, Manila with a degree of Bachelor of Secondary Education major in English.

== Pinoy Dream Academy ==
Laarni decided to audition to the second season of the Pinoy Dream Academy. An inspirational song, "Lead Me Lord" earned her the 15th slot after a long process of elimination.

After 13 weeks in the academy, Laarni was hailed the Grand Star Dreamer on September 14, 2008 at the Cuneta Astrodome. At the end of the show's two-night finale, she garnered 651,696 votes (35.21% of the total votes).

On October 9, 2008, she and Phillip Nolasco, Little Grand Star Dreamer, received the keys to their new houses in Binangonan, Rizal and one million pesos as their prize for winning the competition.

=== In-Academy Performances ===
- Official Performances
  1. In Your Eyes - George Benson Original Singer
  2. As If We Never Said Goodbye - Barbra Streisand
  3. Fighter - Christina Aguilera
  4. Kung Ako Na Lang Sana — Bituin Escalante, with Iñaki
  5. Natural Woman - Aretha Franklin
  6. Let's Groove - Earth, Wind & Fire, with Apple & Miguel
  7. Too Much Heaven - The Bee Gees, with Apple & Miguel
  8. ‘Di Ko Kayang Tanggapin — April Boy Regino
  9. Bohemian Rhapsody - Queen
  10. On The Wings of Love / Back at One - Jeffrey Osborne/ Brian McKnight, counterpoint with Bugoy
  11. The Prayer - Andrea Bocelli & Celine Dion, with Jed Madela
  12. I Am Blessed - Eternal
  13. Waray Waray - Eartha Kitt, Mabuhay Singers
  14. Manalig Ka - Laarni Losala
  15. Boogie Wonderland - Earth, Wind & Fire
- Face-Off Performances
  1. And I Am Telling You I'm Not Going - Jennifer Holliday, with Poy
- ASAP Performances
  1. Hiram - Zsazsa Padilla, with Zsazsa Padilla
  2. Starting Over Again - Natalie Cole, with Sheryn Regis

== Career ==
Laarni's Grand Star Dreamer title has earned her a place in the stable of talents of ABS-CBN. Laarni Lozada is the Philippines' Ethereal Diva, and the only Filipino artist who appeared twice in ASAP Versus segment due to high public demand, on August 5, 2018 with her contender, Suklay Diva, Katrina Velarde. She has made appearances in many programs, especially in Boy & Kris where she has guested four times already in a span of three weeks. Other guestings include game shows like The Singing Bee, Wowowee and Pilipinas, Game KNB?; and talk shows like Umagang Kay Ganda, The Buzz, Entertainment Live, and even Sharon. She has also guested in the Little Grand Dream Night of Pinoy Dream Academy: Little Dreamers.

Her first single, Manalig Ka, was written by Ryan Cayabyab. It is included in the Top 10 scholar's album, namely Scholar's Sing Cayabyab. The album Scholar's Sing Cayabyab has been certified with a gold award.

On September 30, 2008, Laarni signed her very first recording contract with ABS-CBN and Star Music. With all new compositions, she is set to release an album in the near future.

She released her self-titled debut album Laarni Lozada, spawning the hit single Kung Iniibig Ka Niya which was penned by one of the most prolific hit makers in the Philippines Vehnee Saturno. The song Kung Iniibig Ka Niya is the theme song of the latest ABS-CBN soap opera entitled Kambal sa Uma. Her second single, a revival of the hit song Bakit Nga Ba Mahal Kita which was originally sung by Roselle Nava is the theme song the ABS-CBN Precious Hearts Romances series entitled Alyna.

She was also handpicked by Gary Valenciano to sing a duet of his hit song "Narito" at his anniversary concert Gary at 25 at the Araneta Coliseum and later on joined Gary Valenciano with Rachelle Ann Go and Karylle for his hit song Each Passing Night. The concert is set to be released as a DVD.

Laarni Lozada is currently under Backroom Inc., the talent management and booking office of Mr. Boy Abunda.

Laarni is currently preparing to take part in the Star Magic World Tour, which would bring her the US, Canada and Dubai together with the biggest stars of ABS-CBN's talent arm, Star Magic.

Laarni is the endorser of Belo, Black Beauty Shampoo and Dibuho Clothing Apparel.

Laarni can be seen as a semi-regular artist on ASAP.

== Voice ==
Laarni's voice is classified as a dramatic soprano verging on coloratura. She can effortlessly shift from classical/opera music to power ballads. Laarni is also known for her versatility when it comes to her mastery of different genres. Laarni can sing operatic arias, jazz, standards, bossa nova, rock songs, pop/dance songs, R&B songs, kundiman and power ballads.

== Television ==
Year	Title	Role
2002	Sing Galing!	as contestant
2008	Pinoy Dream Academy: Season 2	as herself
2008	ASAP '08	as herself
2009	ASAP '09	as herself
2009	Showtime	as herself
2010	ASAP XV	as herself
2018	Eumee vs. Laarni	
	Laarni vs. Katrina	

== Discography ==
=== Studio albums ===
Date of release	Title	Album Sales Award
2008 Star Music	Laarni Lozada	Gold

=== Other albums ===
Date of release	Title	Album Sales Award
2008 Star Music; Dream Music	Scholars Sing Cayabyab	Gold

=== Singles ===
Year	Title
2008	"Manalig Ka"
2008	"Kung Iniibig Ka Niya"
2009	"Bakit Nga Ba Mahal Kita"

== Awards and nominations ==
Year	Award-giving body	Award	Result
2006	Philippine Women's University Campus Idol	Grand Champion	Won
2006	Philippine Women's University	Meritorious Achievement Award	Won
2006	Rotaract Singing Contest	Grand Champion	Won
2008	Pinoy Dream Academy (season 2)	Grand Star Dreamer, Champion	Won
2008	Asian Excellence Awards	Most Promising Female Performer of the Year	Won
2009	PMPC Star Awards for Music	Best New Female Recording Artist of the Year	Nominated
2009	Consumers Choice Awards	Outstanding Female Performern	Won
2009	Awit Awards	Best New Female Recording Artist	Won
2013	World Championships of Performing Arts (WCOPA at Hollywood, Los Angeles California)	Silver Medal - Opera Category	Won
2013	World Championships of Performing Arts (WCOPA at Hollywood, Los Angeles California)	Gold Medal - Gospel Category	Won
2013	World Championships of Performing Arts (WCOPA at Hollywood, Los Angeles California)	Gold Medal - Jazz Category	Won
2013	World Championships of Performing Arts (WCOPA at Hollywood, Los Angeles California)	Gold Medal - Pop Category	Won
2013	World Championships of Performing Arts (WCOPA at Hollywood, Los Angeles California)	Gold Medal - Broadway Category	Won
2013	World Championships of Performing Arts (WCOPA at Hollywood, Los Angeles California)	Over-All Champion in Senior Division	Won
2013	World Championships of Performing Arts (WCOPA at Hollywood, Los Angeles California)	Semi-Finalist	Won
2018	PMPC Star Awards for Music	Compilation Album of the Year "Sana May Forever" album	Won
2018	PMPC Star Awards for Music	Female Recording Artist of the Year	Nominated
2019	39th Consumers Choice Awards	Outstanding World Class Female Performing Artist	Won
2019	40th Top Choice Global Awards	World Class Female Performing Artist	Won
2019	Gawad sa Puso ng Sining Excellence Awards for Music	Pinakamahusay na Mang-Aawit ng Taon	Won
2021	Diamond Excellence Awards	Outstanding Female Singer of the Year	Won
2022	Maharlikang Filipino Awards	Maharlikang Parangal sa Larangan ng Musika	Won

== See also ==
- Pinoy Dream Academy
- Pinoy Dream Academy (season 2)
- ABS-CBN

Preceded by Yeng Constantino	Pinoy Dream Academy; Grand Star Dreamer; 2008	Succeeded by Final
