= This Band =

Filipino indie pop band

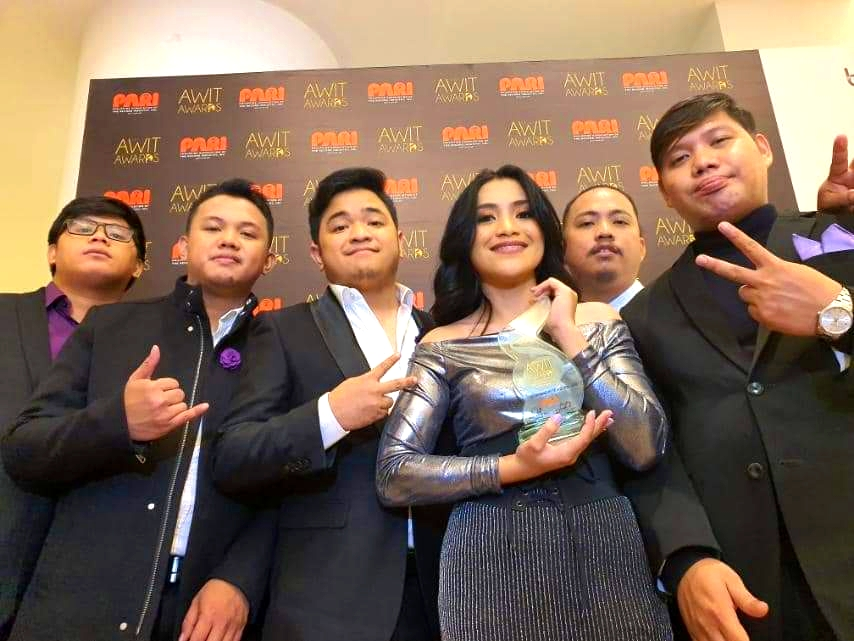
- This Band members (from left to right), Ar-Em Gubat, Melvin Carson, Euwie Loria, Andee Manzano, John Macaranas, and Mikki Galvan.

Background information
- Origin: Las Piñas, Metro Manila, Philippines
- Genres: Pop rock; indie pop
- Years active: 2017–present
- Label: Viva Records
- Members: Andee Manzano; Euwie Loria; Mikki Galvan; John Macaranas; Melvin Carson; Ar-Em Gubat

This Band is an indie pop rock band based in Las Piñas, Philippines. They are best known for their sleeper hit single "Kahit Ayaw Mo Na". The official music video for the song reached 22 million views, and the official lyric video reached 6.5 million views.

== Career ==
In 2017, This Band started performing as a band at KM17 Place and several food parks in Las Piñas. The band went through various male singers before finding Andrea Manzano whose voice is being compared to KZ Tandingan. Manzano used to sing for a Christian band in her local church before joining the band. Later on, they released their first single, "Kahit Ayaw Mo Na". Their next single, "Hindi Na Nga", reached 17 million views on YouTube.

== Members ==
- Andrea "Andee" Manzano – lead vocals (2017–present)
- Euwie Von Loria – rhythm guitar, backing vocals (2017–present)
- Miccael Galvan – bass (2017–present)
- John Kenneth Macaranas – drums (2017–present)
- Melvin Carson – keyboards, backing vocals (2017–present)
- Raymart Gubat – lead guitar (2018–present)

== Discography ==
=== Singles ===
==== As lead artist ====
Title	Year	Album
"Kahit Ayaw Mo Na"	2018	Non-album singles
"Bitaw Na"	2018	Non-album singles
"Tampisaw"	2018	Non-album singles
"Hindi Na Nga"	2018	Non-album singles
"Ligaya?"	2019	Non-album singles
"'Di Na Babalik"	2019	Non-album singles
"Nang Iwan"	2019	Non-album singles
'"Wala Na ang Init" (with Pusakalye)	2019	Non-album singles
"'Di Sapat Pero Tapat"	2019	Non-album singles
"Rebound"	2020	Non-album singles
"Sinungaling Ka"	2020	Huwag Matakot
"Kaya Sorry Na"	2020	Huwag Matakot
"Bakit Ganon"	2020	Huwag Matakot
"Aalis Ka Rin"	2020	Huwag Matakot
"'Di Susuko"	2020	Huwag Matakot
"No Label"	2020	Huwag Matakot
"Huwag Matakot"	2020	Huwag Matakot
"'Di Na Babalik - Acoustic"	2021	This Band Stripped Down Album
"'Di Sapat Pero Tapat - Acoustic"	2021	This Band Stripped Down Album
"Kahit Ayaw Mo Na - Acoustic"	2021	This Band Stripped Down Album
"Nang Iwan - Acoustic"	2021	This Band Stripped Down Album
"Hindi Na Nga - Acoustic"	2021	This Band Stripped Down Album
"Wala Ka Nang Magagawa"	2021	Non-album singles

==== Promotional singles ====
Title	Year	Album
"Sa Nangungulila" (with Sarah Geronimo)	2019	Coke Studio Season 03
"Kilometro" (cover of the Sarah Geronimo song)	2019	Coke Studio Season 03
"Liwanag sa Dilim" (cover of the Rivermaya song)	2020	Rico Blanco Songbook (Various Artists)

==== Soundtrack appearances ====
Title	Year	Album
"Kahit Ayaw Mo Na"	2018	Kahit Ayaw Mo Na (Soundtrack)
"'Di Na Babalik"	2020	Love the Way You Lie (Soundtrack)

== Awards and nominations ==
Name of the award ceremony, year presented, award category, nominee(s) of the award, and the result of the nomination
Award ceremony	Year	Category	Nominee(s)/work(s)	Result	Ref.
Asian Academy Creative Awards	2020	Best Branded Program or Series	"Coke Studio Season 3: Family Feels featuring Sarah Geronimo and This Band"	Won	
Awit Awards	2019	Album of the Year	"Kahit Ayaw Mo Na"	Nominated	
Awit Awards	2019	Best Performance by a Group Recording Artist	"Kahit Ayaw Mo Na"	Won	
Awit Awards	2019	Best Performance by a New Group Recording Artist	"Kahit Ayaw Mo Na"	Nominated	
Awit Awards	2019	Record of the Year	"Kahit Ayaw Mo Na"	Nominated	
Awit Awards	2019	Song of the Year	"Kahit Ayaw Mo Na"	Nominated	
MOR Pinoy Music Awards	2019	Band of the Year	"Kahit Ayaw Mo Na"	Nominated	
PMPC Star Awards for Music	2019	Song of the Year	"Kahit Ayaw Mo Na"	Nominated	
PMPC Star Awards for Music	2019	Song of the Year	"Hindi Na Nga"	Nominated	
Village Pipol Choice Awards	2019	Group Performer of the Year	"This Band"	Nominated	
