= Pinoy Dream Academy season 2 =

Season of Philippine reality television

Pinoy Dream Academy
- Season 2
- Hosted by: Toni Gonzaga; Nikki Gil; Billy Crawford
- Winner: Laarni Lozada

Release
- Original release: June 14, 2008

Season chronology
- ← Previous; Season 1

Pinoy Dream Academy is a Philippine television program similar to Big Brother. The second season began on June 14, 2008 replacing Pinoy Big Brother: Teen Edition Plus and was replaced by Kahit Isang Saglit. Nikki Gil and Toni Gonzaga reprised their roles as hosts of the show, but Gonzaga now handled the main hosting plum while Gil appeared both on the Probation Nights and Little Dreamers Gala/Expulsion Night. Billy Crawford joined this season as the host of the late afternoon edition Pinoy Dream Academy Überture.

A new logo was introduced on the second season, featuring an old-fashioned microphone and the word "Dream" using a different font than the rest of the title. Also, a new version of the theme song Awit ng Pangarap sung by first season winner Yeng Constantino was used, although the original version was also used, especially during Gala Nights.

Thirty-two potential scholars for the show were introduced with their backgrounds documented in a primer segment aired as part of Pinoy Big Brother: Teen Edition Plus. They were also interviewed on the radio segment Pinoy Dream Academy Dream Minute on WRR 101.9. These thirty-two went through a primary elimination selection from which the final roster of scholars was chosen. These eliminations were aired as a series of episodes called The Dream BIGins from June 9 to 13, 2008.

New to this season was a "Little Dreamers" competition for children aged 6 to 10. On July 6, 2008, twelve children were chosen to become the academy's resident Little Scholars. In this end, a new puppet named Billilit (portmanteau of "Billy" and bulilit or kid) joins the show as semi-host and Billy's sidekick on Übertube as far as any topic regarding this side competition is concerned.

== Scholars ==
From the thirty-two potential scholars, the primary eliminations saw the number dwindle to twenty-five. From that number, the faculty re-examined the performances of the scholars to choose the final list of scholars who would enter the academy. The final roster was announced one-by-one on the Grand Opening Night on June 14, 2008. Only fifteen were chosen and entered the academy on that day; the sixteenth chosen scholar, Maria Consuelo Osorio, backed out of the competition and the slot left behind would be occupied by one of four "wait-listers" to be decided by the viewers. The "wait-lister" chosen to be the new sixteenth scholar would enter the academy the next day.

The chosen "wait-lister" was Ranjit "Jet" Singh with 51.70% of the overnight voting. The other three wait-listers Lamberto "Lambert" Reyes (currently known as David Idol), Catherine "Poy" Palma, and Hera "Banig" Redoblado got 20.16%, 17.46%, and 10.68% of the votes respectively.

Palma later entered the academy as an honorary scholar. Her assignment as the honorary scholar was to try to become a Star Scholar in the Gala Performance Nights. In each time she successfully achieved her goal and become the Star Scholar of the week, she would earn P50,000, which would be deducted from the total cash pool reserved for the Top Three Scholars at the end of the season. If she would become the Star Scholar for three weeks (not necessarily consecutive), she had the option of leaving the academy and taking home the P150,000 she would accumulate or stay on as an official scholar, therefore forfeiting her winnings. Eventually, she left the academy without becoming the Star Scholar.

From the Seventh Gala Night onwards, being a Star Scholar entailed having a duet on ASAP with a celebrity a week after. Included dates are the dates when they performed on the said program.

On the last week, three scholars with very awkward-sounding surnames were given stage names by teacher Jose Javier Reyes. Van and Laarni each had several letters of their surnames changed while Bugoy obtained his based on his mother's maiden name.

On the Pinoy Dream Academy Season 2 Grand Dream Night, the Awards Night, Laarni Lozada was awarded the title Grand Star Dreamer. Bugoy Drilon was the 2nd Star Dreamer while Miguel Mendoza became the 3rd Star Dreamer. Liezel Garcia, Van Roxas and Cris Pastor were the Top 4, 5 and 6 Finalists of the academy, respectively.

Laarni Losala a. k. a. Laarni Lozada (23, working student from Sultan Kudarat)

1. In Your Eyes – Regine Velasquez
2. As If We Never Said Goodbye – Barbra Streisand
3. Fighter – Christina Aguilera
4. Kung Ako Na Lang Sana – Bituin Escalante, duet with Iñaki
5. (You Make Me Feel Like) A Natural Woman – Aretha Franklin
6. Let's Groove – Earth, Wind & Fire, trio with Apple & Miguel
7. Too Much Heaven – The Bee Gees, a cappella trio with Apple & Miguel
8. ‘Di Ko Kayang Tanggapin – April Boy Regino, face-off with Zhel
9. Bohemian Rhapsody – Queen
10. On The Wings of Love – Regine Velasquez, counterpoint with Bugoy
11. The Prayer – Andrea Bocelli & Celine Dion, duet with Jed Madela
12. I Am Blessed – Eternal
13. Waray Waray – Lani Misalucha
14. Manalig Ka – Laarni Losala – Winner – September 14, 2008
15. Boogie Wonderland – Earth Wind and Fire – Winner – September 14, 2008

Face-Off Performances

1. And I Am Telling You I'm Not Going – Jennifer Holliday, face-off and duet with Poy

ASAP Performances

1. Hiram - Zsazsa Padilla, duet with Zsazsa Padilla – Star Scholar – August 24, 2008
2. Starting Over Again – Natalie Cole, duet with Sheryn Regis – Top 3 Scholar – August 31, 2008

Jay Drilon Bogayan a. k. a. Bugoy Drilon (19, canteen janitor and farm hand from Camarines Sur)

1. You'll Never Walk Alone – Frank Sinatra
2. Can't Take My Eyes Off You – Frankie Valli
3. Forevermore – Side A
4. If I Ain't Got You – Alicia Keys, duet with Zhel
5. I'll Make Love To You – Boyz II Men
6. Yesterday – The Beatles, a cappella trio with Sen & Van
7. Tearin' Up My Heart – *NSYNC, trio with Sen & Van
8. Nakapagtataka – Sponge Cola, face-off with Apple
9. As – George Michael & Mary J. Blige
10. Back At One – Brian McKnight, counterpoint with Laarni
11. Muli – Gary Valenciano & Regine Velasquez, duet with Vina Morales
12. Can't Stop A River – Guy Sebastian
13. All I Need Is You – Guy Sebastian
14. Climb Ev'ry Mountain – The Sound of Music – 1st Runner-up – September 14, 2008
15. Ligaya - The Eraserheads – 1st Runner-up – September 14, 2008

Face-Off Performances

1. Magkasuyo Buong Gabi – Janno Gibbs & Regine Velasquez, face-off and duet with Poy

ASAP Performances

1. No Air – Jordin Sparks and Chris Brown, duet with Yeng Constantino – Star Scholar – August 17, 2008
2. 'Di Bale na Lang – Gary Valenciano, duet with Gary Valenciano – Top 3 Scholar – August 31, 2008

Miguel Mendoza (19, former Philippine Idol finalist from Muntinlupa)

1. A House Is Not A Home – Luther Vandross
2. Farewell – Raymond Lauchengco
3. Hahanapin Ko – Anthony Castelo
4. Araw-Gabi – Regine Velasquez, duet with Bea
5. You've Lost That Lovin' Feelin' – The Righteous Brothers
6. Let's Groove – Earth, Wind & Fire, trio with Laarni & Apple
7. Too Much Heaven – The Bee Gees, a cappella trio with Laarni & Apple
8. When Doves Cry – Prince, face-off with Iñaki
9. What Are You Doing the Rest of Your Life? – Sarah Vaughan
10. Stay Awake – Ronnie Laws, counterpoint with Zhel
11. Never Ever Say Goodbye – Nonoy Zuñiga, duet with Sheryn Regis
12. Sandra – Barry Manilow
13. Rock DJ – Robbie Williams
14. Love Is On The Way – Celine Dion – 2nd Runner-up – September 14, 2008
15. Man In The Mirror – Michael Jackson – 2nd Runner-up – September 14, 2008

ASAP Performance

1. Himala – Rivermaya, with Yeng Constantino, Cris and Van – Finalist – September 7, 2008

Maria Liezel "Zhel" Garcia (23, OFW from Dubai, United Arab Emirates)

1. Dance With My Father – Luther Vandross
2. Count On Me – Whitney Houston
3. So Much In Love – Sheena Easton
4. If I Ain't Got You – Alicia Keys, duet with Bugoy
5. Sa Aking Pag-iisa – Regine Velasquez
6. Stop – Spice Girls, trio with Bunny & Cris
7. The Tide Is High – Atomic Kitten, a cappella trio with Bunny & Cris
8. Listen – Beyoncé, face-off with Laarni
9. Best Of My Love – The Emotions
10. Sometimes A Love Goes Wrong – Carrie Lucas, counterpoint with Miguel
11. Tell Me – Joey Albert, duet with Joey Generoso (of Side A)
12. Goodbye's (The Saddest Word) – Celine Dion
13. Don't Stop The Music – Rihanna
14. I Am Changing - Jennifer Holliday – Top 4 Finalist – September 14, 2008
15. Respect – Aretha Franklin – Top 4 Finalist – September 14, 2008

Face-Off Performances

1. Got to be Real – Cheryl Lynn, face-off and duet with Poy

ASAP Performances

1. Paano Kita Iibigin? – Regine Velasquez & Piolo Pascual, duet with Piolo Pascual – Star Scholar – August 10, 2008
2. I Don't Want To Miss A Thing – Aerosmith, duet with Nina – Top 3 Scholar – August 31, 2008

Van Louelle Pojas a. k. a. Van Roxas (18, Physical Therapy student and band vocalist from Cebu)

1. Can't Fight This Feeling – REO Speedwagon
2. Next In Line – Wency Cornejo
3. Turn Back the Clock – Johnny Hates Jazz
4. Nobody Wants to Be Lonely – Ricky Martin & Christina Aguilera, duet with Apple
5. Bed Of Roses – Bon Jovi
6. Yesterday – The Beatles, a cappella trio with Sen & Bugoy
7. Tearin' Up My Heart – *NSYNC, trio with Sen & Bugoy
8. Through The Fire – Chaka Khan, face-off with Sen
9. Tatsulok – Bamboo
10. Maybe – Peabo Bryson, counterpoint with Poy
11. Bulong – Kitchie Nadal, duet with Kitchie Nadal
12. Who Am I? – Casting Crowns
13. True to Your Heart – 98 Degrees & Stevie Wonder
14. Hard Habit to Break – Chicago – Top 5 Finalist – September 14, 2008
15. Probinsyana – Bamboo – Top 5 Finalist – September 14, 2008

ASAP Performance

1. Himala – Rivermaya, with Yeng Constantino, Cris and Miguel – Finalist – September 7, 2008

Cristina "Cris" Pastor (21, interior designer from Parañaque)

1. Papa Oom Mow Mow – The Beach Boys
2. Come Together – The Beatles
3. These Dreams – Heart
4. Burn – Tina Arena, duet with Hansen
5. Bleeding Love – Leona Lewis
6. Stop – Spice Girls, trio with Bunny & Zhel
7. The Tide Is High – Atomic Kitten, a cappella trio with Bunny & Zhel
8. It's Raining Men – Geri Halliwell, face-off with Bunny
9. Tattoo – Jordin Sparks
10. Dahil Mahal na Mahal Kita – Roselle Nava, counterpoint with Iñaki
11. Kissing A Fool – George Michael, duet with Richard Poon
12. Inseparable – Natalie Cole
13. Sway – Pussycat Dolls
14. Candyman – Christina Aguilera – Top 6 Finalist – September 14, 2008
15. Out Here On My Own – Irene Cara – Top 6 Finalist – September 14, 2008

ASAP Performance

1. Himala – Rivermaya, with Yeng Constantino, Miguel and Van – Finalist – September 7, 2008

Hansen "Sen" Nichols (24, thyroid cancer survivor from Taguig City)

1. Kailangan Kita – Piolo Pascual
2. I Believe I Can Fly – R. Kelly
3. Escape – Enrique Iglesias
4. Burn – Tina Arena, duet with Cris
5. My Chérie Amour – Stevie Wonder
6. Yesterday – The Beatles, a cappella trio with Bugoy & Van
7. Tearin' Up My Heart – *NSYNC, trio with Bugoy & Van
8. Bailamos – Enrique Iglesias, face-off with Van
9. Hold On – Side A
10. Say That You Love Me – Martin Nievera, counterpoint with Bunny
11. Can We Just Stop and Talk a While? – Kyla feat. Gary Valenciano, duet with Rachel Alejandro
12. His Eye Is on the Sparrow – Lauryn Hill – Expelled – August 30, 2008

Rafael Ignacio "Iñaki" Salvador-Ting (18, stage performer from Pasig)

1. Close To You – The Carpenters
2. Superstar – The Carpenters
3. Time After Time – Cyndi Lauper
4. Kung Ako Na Lang Sana – Bituin Escalante, duet with Laarni
5. Kiss – Prince and The Revolution
6. To Where You Are – Josh Groban
7. Panalangin – APO Hiking Society, duet with Christian
8. I'd Do Anything For Love (But I Won't Do That) – Meat Loaf, face-off with Miguel
9. Spain – Al Jarreau
10. Kunin Mo Na Ang Lahat Sa Akin – Jeremiah, counterpoint with Cris
11. Proud Mary – Creedence Clearwater Revival, duet with Bituin Escalante – Expelled – August 23, 2008

Catherine "Poy" Palma (22, Registered Nurse from Zamboanga City; Academy Honorary Scholar)

1. I Don't Want To Miss A Thing – Aerosmith
2. Free Your Mind – En Vogue
3. A Piece Of Sky – Barbra Streisand
4. Forever's Not Enough – Sarah Geronimo, counterpoint with Van
5. Livin' on a Prayer – Bon Jovi, duet with the Ryan Cayabyab Singers –Exited – August 23, 2008

Face-Off Performances

1. And I Am Telling You I'm Not Going – Jennifer Holliday, face-off and duet with Laarni
2. Magkasuyo Buong Gabi – Janno Gibbs & Regine Velasquez, face-off and duet with Bugoy
3. Got to be Real – Cheryl Lynn, face-off and duet with Zhel

Jovannie "Bunny" Malunda (22, teacher and mother from Negros Oriental; Chivas' wife)

1. Thanks To You – Tyler Collins
2. You've Got A Friend – James Taylor
3. Pagsubok – Orient Pearl
4. Ain't No Mountain High Enough – Marvin Gaye & Tammi Terrell, duet with Christian
5. Emotion – Destiny's Child
6. Stop – Spice Girls, trio with Zhel & Cris
7. The Tide Is High – Atomic Kitten, a cappella trio with Zhel & Cris
8. Satisfaction – The Rolling Stones, face-off with Cris
9. Lady Marmalade – Labelle
10. Huwag Ka Lang Mawawala – Ogie Alcasid, counterpoint with Sen – Expelled – August 16, 2008

Apple Abarquez (18, college student from Cebu)

1. Papa, Can You Hear Me? – Barbra Streisand
2. Through the Years – Kenny Rogers
3. Come In From The Rain – Melissa Manchester
4. Nobody Wants to Be Lonely – Ricky Martin & Christina Aguilera, duet with Van
5. Fever – Madonna
6. Let's Groove – Earth, Wind & Fire, trio with Laarni & Miguel
7. Too Much Heaven – The Bee Gees, a cappella trio with Laarni & Miguel
8. We Are Family – Sister Sledge, face-off with Bugoy
9. Sweet Love – Anita Baker – Expelled – August 9, 2008

Christian Alvear (25, voice dubber, singer, and actor with a growth hormone deficiency from Taguig City)

1. Laklak – The Teeth
2. Bakit Labis Kitang Mahal – Lea Salonga
3. Can't Smile Without You – Barry Manilow
4. Ain't No Mountain High Enough – Marvin Gaye & Tammi Terrell, duet with Bunny
5. The Way You Make Me Feel – Michael Jackson
6. Shout for Joy – Gary Valenciano, Expelled – July 26, 2008
7. Panalangin – APO Hiking Society, duet with Iñaki – Expelled – July 26, 2008

Beatriz "Bea" Muñoz (18, HRIM student from Muntinlupa; Miguel's girlfriend)

1. Moon River – Frank Sinatra
2. Runaway – The Corrs
3. Kailan – Smokey Mountain
4. Araw-Gabi – Regine Velasquez, duet with Miguel
5. Yakap Sa Dilim – APO Hiking Society – Expelled – July 19, 2008

Ranjit "Jet" Singh (26, former VJ and perennial reality show auditioner/contestant from Rizal)

1. Skyline Pigeon – Elton John
2. I Will Be Here - Gary Valenciano
3. You and Me – Lifehouse – Dropped Out – July 6, 2008

Michelle "Sheng" Belmonte (25, stand-up comic from Quezon City)

1. Salamat – Yeng Constantino
2. Time and Tide – Basia
3. Lean On Me – Bill Withers – Expelled – July 5, 2008

Jun Ross Dio (25, band singer and stylist's son from Quezon City)

1. Father and Son – Cat Stevens & Ronan Keating
2. King and Queen of Hearts – David Pomeranz – Dropped Out – June 30, 2008

Chivas Anton Malunda (22, college student, father, and husband from Negros Oriental)

1. After the Lovin' – Engelbert Humperdinck – Expelled by Mentors – June 26, 2008
2. Just Like A Pill – Pink

Chivas performed on stage at the second gala performance night as a request when he was told that he will be expelled from the academy by the Mentors on June 25, 2008.

=== Organizations ===
Unique to the season is the division of the scholars into two groups called "organizations" (sometimes shortened to orgs). The two orgs, Pupilars and One Voice, compete against each other in inter-org games wherein members of the losing org would do the domestic chores inside the academy, such as maintenance and cooking, while members of the winning org will not only have no chores, they will also get to assist the teachers and mentors during classes.

The orgs each have a weekly budget of P500 per member. During the gala nights, points are scored for each student as usual. Then, the scores for each of an org's members are totaled and the average is obtained. An average score of 7.5 should be obtained for the org to have a new budget for the week. The org's budget is used for any additional expenses as the academy provides them with basic necessities every week.

Initial members of Pupilars are Chivas, Van, Sen, Bugoy, Cris, Zhel and Sheng. Initial members of One Voice are Bunny, Apple, Bea, Miguel, Iñaki, Ross, Christian and Laarni. As Jet entered the academy, he was given a chance to choose his organization and he chose One Voice. Because of the odd number of initial scholars in the academy and the subsequent decision by the last scholar to enter, there was an uneven distribution of scholars in the two orgs. Bunny was the first scholar to change orgs. With One Voice's win, they have to give away one member of their org and chose Bunny to go to Pupilars to reunite with her husband, Chivas. Laarni was the second scholar moved from One Voice to Pupilars as a result of One Voice losing a challenge and Laarni volunteering to do the consequence. The final change in orgs happened when One Voice won an inter-org competition and had an option to swap a team member with a member of the other org. One Voice chose Zhel from Pupilars in exchange for Apple of their own org.

On July 9, 2008, Mr. Ryan Cayabyab officially announced that all scholars should work as one team/organization from that day onwards. As a new rule, the GPA of the scholars should be 7.0 or above to have their weekly budget. Because of this, the two orgs merged into one: Acadreamians.

== Weekly Song Themes ==
Each week, the scholars will sing songs that fit a specific weekly theme. The dates shown are the dates of the Gala Nights.

- Week 1 (June 21): Songs dedicated to their fathers in celebration of Father's Day
- Week 2 (June 28): "Buhay Eskwela" or songs about school life
- Week 3 (July 5): Songs dedicated to their best friends
- Week 4 (July 12): Duets
- Week 5 (July 19): Sensuality
- Week 6 (July 26): Trios (upbeat songs and A Capella)
- Week 7 (August 2): Face-Off (Showstopper songs)
- Week 8 (August 9): Mentor's Choice (Midterms Week)
- Week 9 (August 16): Counterpoint (Combination of two songs)
- Week 10 (August 23): Celebrity Duets (Duet with Celebrity Singers)
- Week 11 (August 30): Scholar's Choice (Scholar's Specialty)
- Week 12 (September 6): Scholar's Choice (Dream BIGayan Project; Song and Dance Number)

== Faculty ==
- Headmaster: Ryan Cayabyab
- Media Performance Mentor: Jose Javier Reyes
- Over-all Voice Mentor: Kitchy Molina
- Academy In-Charge and Voice Mentor: Monet Silvestre
- Voice Teachers: Lindy, Anna
- Diction/Speech Mentor: Von Arroyo
- Dance Mentor: Georcelle Dapat, Maribeth Bichara
- Dance Teachers: Sherwin, Nesh
- Acting Performance Mentor: Malou de Guzman

== Jurors ==
Resident Jurors

- Louie Ocampo
- Gerard Salonga - June 28, 2008 - July 26, 2008; August 16, 2008 - August 23, 2008

Guest Jurors

- Hajji Alejandro – June 21, 2008
- Girlie Rodis – June 21, 2008; August 30, 2008; September 13, 2008
- Isay Alvarez – June 28, 2008
- Rachelle Ann Go – July 5, 2008
- Jamie Rivera – July 12, 2008
- Vina Morales – July 19, 2008
- Verni Varga – July 26, 2008
- Ivy Violan – August 2, 2008
- Jimmy Bondoc – August 2, 2008
- Leah Navarro – August 9, 2008
- Jim Paredes (former Headmaster) – August 9, 2008
- Lani Misalucha – August 16, 2008
- Dulce – August 23, 2008
- Kathleen Dy Go – September 6, 2008

== Grades ==
The grades shown below are the grades of the scholars from the 1st Gala Night to the 10th Gala Night. For the 10th Gala Night, the scholars will be graded not only by the set of jurors but also by their mentors, Media Performance mentor Joey Reyes, Over-all Voice mentor Kitchy Molina and Headmaster Ryan Cayabyab. It should also be noted that the 10th Gala Night is the last time the jurors will be giving a grade to the scholars.

Scholar	1	2	3	4	5	6	7	8	9	10	Avg.
Scholar	June 21	June 28	July 5	July 12	July 19	July 26	Aug. 2	Aug. 9	Aug. 16	Aug. 23	Avg.
Laarni	5.17	7.70	6.73	7.66	8.73	9.06	8.00	7.83	8.97	8.94	7.88
Bugoy	7.60	7.73	7.33	9.03	8.80	9.82	8.67	9.60	8.77	9.81	8.72
Miguel	8.83	6.83	6.83	5.06	6.27	9.06	7.00	7.13	7.50	8.18	7.27
Zhel	8.97	8.87	8.70	9.03	8.73	8.32	9.67	9.00	7.63	8.90	8.78
Van	8.63	5.40	7.73	6.20	7.07	9.82	5.60	9.07	7.77	7.30	7.46
Cris	8.23	4.66	6.77	5.36	6.70	8.32	7.17	9.10	7.43	8.46	7.22
Sen	7.43	5.63	7.60	5.36	7.63	9.82	7.33	7.70	6.30	7.29	7.21
Iñaki	6.17	6.80	6.87	7.66	6.33	7.21	7.87	9.00	7.27	8.84	7.40
Poy						6.12	9.42	9.13	8.63	9.63	8.59
Bunny	7.37	5.10	6.93	7.86	6.03	8.32	5.17	8.13	6.40		6.81
Apple	7.33	6.73	6.80	6.20	8.07	9.06	6.58	7.40			7.27
Christian	5.23	6.23	7.63	7.86	6.33	7.21					6.75
Bea	6.40	5.03	6.40	5.06	6.50						5.88
Jet	7.77	5.00	5.57								6.11
Sheng	7.10	4.36	7.37								6.28
Ross	8.00	5.56									6.78
Chivas	7.67										7.67

Grades for first 3 weeks of scholars with YELLOW bar beside their name are counted for Pupilar's GPA.
Grades for first 3 weeks of scholars with BLUE bar beside their name are counted for One Voice's GPA.
Grades for the remaining weeks of scholars with GREEN bar beside their name are counted for Acadreamians' GPA.
Laarni's 1st grade is counted for One Voice's GPA while 2nd and 3rd grades are counted for Pupilar's GPA.

Grades in RED indicate that the scholar is on probationary status.
Grades in DARK GREEN indicate that the contestant was the Star Scholar of the week.
Grades in YELLOW GREEN indicate that the scholar received the highest grade for the week, but was not the Star Scholar.
Grades highlighted in BLACK indicate that the scholar's grade was not counted for the organization's grade and their average grade.

=== Organizations' Average Grades ===
Black numbers indicate that the organization obtained its budget for the next week; red ones mean that the organization failed to win its weekly budget.

For the first three weeks, each organization had to get a GPA of 7.50 or higher to have a weekly budget. Starting week 4, the organizations were dissolved and all scholars now belong to one org. The org should get a GPA of 7.00 or higher to have a weekly budget.

	1	2	3		4	5	6	7	8	9	10
	Jun. 21	Jun. 28	Jul. 5		Jul. 12	Jul. 19	Jul. 26	Aug. 2	Aug. 9	Aug. 16	Aug. 23
One Voice	6.86	6.03	6.68	Acadreamians	6.86	7.34	8.50	7.49	8.57	7.81	8.41
Pupilars	7.88	6.18	7.82	Acadreamians	6.86	7.34	8.50	7.49	8.57	7.81	8.41

Pupilars got an initial 7.32 GPA. However, because of their win over One Voice in the music video competition, they got an additional 0.5 in their GPA.

== Expulsion Nights Elimination Chart ==
For this season, the voting procedure has been altered. Among the bottom four scholars, the mentors will save one. Among the remaining three scholars during the first probationary night, the other scholars will vote for who they want to save. The scholar with the highest votes from his/her peers will be saved. In case of ties, the vote of the scholar saved by the mentors will be counted twice. The last two scholars will be up for public voting, and hence be the probationary scholars of the week. By the next gala performance night, the scholar with the higher number of public votes will be saved.

In the second probationary night, the other scholars would vote from the three remaining probationary scholars on who they want to stay as a probationary student. The one with the lowest number of votes is saved from being subjected to viewer's votes.

In the 7th Gala Night, instead of a bottom four, there was a bottom five to accommodate for the losers in the face-offs while in the 10th Gala Night, there was a bottom two due to the discontinuation of saving processes of by the mentors and their fellow scholars, respectively.

Gala Night	1st	2nd	3rd	4th	5th	6th	7th	8th	9th	10th	Grand Dream Night
Star Scholar	Zhel	Zhel	Zhel	None	Bugoy	None	Zhel	Bugoy	Laarni	Bugoy	LAARNI
Top Three Scholars	Zhel; Miguel; Van	Zhel; Bugoy; Laarni	Zhel; Van; Christian	Zhel & Bugoy; Bunny & Christian; Laarni & Iñaki	Bugoy; Laarni; Zhel	Bugoy; Sen; Van	Zhel; Poy; Bugoy	Bugoy; Poy; Cris	Laarni; Bugoy; Poy	Bugoy; Poy; Laarni	Laarni; Bugoy; Miguel
Bottom Four Scholars	Bea; Iñaki; Christian; Laarni	Bea; Jet; Cris; Sheng	Cris; Laarni; Bea; Jet	Cris; Sen; Bea; Miguel	Christian; Iñaki; Miguel; Bunny	None	Laarni; Miguel; Apple; Van; Bunny	Bunny; Laarni; Sen; Miguel	Cris; Iñaki; Miguel; Sen	Sen; Van	Open Voting
Mentors' Choice	Christian	Bea	None	Cris	Miguel	None	Bunny	Laarni	Sen	None	None
Laarni	Exempt	Jet	-	Sen	Christian	-	Exempt	Miguel	Cris	-	Winner
Bugoy	Bea	Jet	-	Sen	Christian	-	Van	Sen	Cris	-	1st runner-up
Miguel	Bea	Jet	-	Exempt	Iñaki	-	Exempt	Exempt	Exempt	-	2nd runner-up
Zhel	Iñaki	Jet	-	Sen	Bunny	-	Van	Sen	Cris	-	Finalist
Van	Iñaki	Jet	-	Sen	Bunny	-	Exempt	Sen	Cris	-	Finalist
Cris	Laarni	Exempt	-	Sen	Bunny	-	Van	Miguel	Exempt	-	Finalist
Sen	Laarni	Jet	-	Exempt	Christian	-	Van	Exempt	Cris	-	Expelled
Iñaki	Exempt	Jet	-	Miguel	Exempt	-	Miguel	Miguel	Exempt	Expelled	
Poy	Not in Academy					Not Eligible				Exited the Academy	
Bunny	Bea	Jet	-	Miguel	Exempt	-	Apple	Exempt	Expelled		
Apple	Bea	Jet	-	Bea	Bunny	-	Exempt	Expelled			
Christian	Bea	Sheng	-	Sen	Exempt	Expelled					
Bea	Exempt	Jet	-	Exempt	Expelled						
Jet	Bea	Exempt	-	Dropped Out							
Sheng	Bea	Exempt	Expelled								
Ross	Iñaki	Sheng	Dropped Out								
Chivas	Bea	Expelled by Mentors									
Scholars' Choice	Bea; 8 of 13 votes to save	Cris; 0 of 12 votes to expel	None	Sen; 6 of 9 votes to save	Bunny; 4 of 8 votes to save	None	Van; 4 of 6 votes to save	Miguel; 3 of 6 votes to save	Cris; 5 of 5 votes to save	None	None
Notes	Note 1	Note 2	Note 3	Note 4	None	Note 5	Note 6	Note 7	Note 8	Note 9	None
On Probation	Iñaki; Laarni	Jet; Sheng	None	Bea; Miguel	Christian; Iñaki	None	Apple; Laarni; Miguel	Bunny; Sen	Iñaki; Miguel	Sen; Van	Open Voting
Viewers' Choice	none	Jet; 51.07%	None	Miguel; 74.85%	Iñaki; 56.01%	None	Laarni; 72.74% Miguel; 13.96%	Sen; 60.35%	Miguel; 75.97%	Van; 54.58%	Laarni; 35.21% Bugoy; 29.70% Miguel; 13.69%
Left the academy	Chivas	Sheng; 48.93% ------ Ross	Jet	Bea; 25.15%	Christian; 43.99%	None	Apple; 13.30%	Bunny; 39.65%	Iñaki; 24.03% ------ Poy	Sen; 45.42%	Zhel; 13.36% Van; 6.06% Cris; 1.97% (out of 6)

^Note 1: Bunny and Chivas cast their votes in the hospital, where they returned after their performances in the first gala night. Since the mentors already made their decision on which scholar they would save a few hours after that show, Bunny and Chivas already knew the three remaining probationary co-scholars beforehand when they voted the next day. Chivas was sent to the hospital two days before the gala night after suffering the effects of hyperventilation; his wife was by his side. Three days after the start of voting however, Chivas collapsed to the floor, again caused by hyperventilation. Concerned, the faculty decided to expel Chivas from the academy. Laarni was then transferred to Pupilars as a result of a consequence when One Voice lost in their inter-org competition. Voting was stopped due to this and Laarni and Iñaki were therefore saved from expulsion.
^Note 2: Because of a change of procedure for the second probation night, "'Saved' by Scholars / Scholar's choice" means that the probationary scholar who gets the lowest number of votes from his/her peers will be the one safe from expulsion and will not be subjected to viewers' votes. A day after the start of voting, Ross decided to drop out of the academy due to the pressure he felt inside the academy and his concerns for his family. His exit however, did not affect the voting.
^Note 3: Because of Jet's decision to drop out of the academy, the other three scholars on probation were saved from expulsion.
^Note 4: The procedure for voting this week was that the scholars will vote for the probationary scholar they want to stay in the academy, as opposed to the second week in which they would vote for the probationary scholar they want to stay in probation and be subjected to viewers' votes. Although Bea is already a fourth time probationary scholar, she was not expelled due to Jet's decision to drop out on the third probationary night.
^Note 5: Because the Headmaster's "List of 10" is now complete, an announcement was made that there will be no probationary scholars for the week.
^Note 6: Probationary scholars were not the actual scholars with the lowest grades. Because of the face-off, whoever receives the lower grade in each pair will be under probation. Among the 10 official scholars, Laarni ranked fourth and is still in probation as she lost in her face-off with Zhel.
^Note 7: Zhel being the top scorer in the midterm exams, was automatically immune from probation. Because Bunny was the lowest in the midterm exams, she was automatically put on probation. Furthermore, as she wasn't able to make herself part of the top three in the 8th Gala Night, she could not be saved by her co-scholars. Also, because Laarni was saved by the mentors, her vote counts twice, saving Miguel even if he and Sen are technically tied in the Scholars' voting.
^Note 8: After the 9th Gala Expulsion Night, Mr. C informed Poy that she will leave the academy after her performance during the 10th Gala Expulsion Night.
^Note 9: On the 10th Gala Expulsion Night, it was announced that there will be no more bottom four mentioned. Instead, the two scholars with the lowest grades are automatically the probationary scholars of the week, and therefore are subjected to public voting. Also, no top three was announced and instead the Star Scholar was announced immediately.

== Finale Weekend ==
On September 13 and 14, 2008, the two-day finale, known as the "Grand Dream Nights," were held in the Cuneta Astrodome in Pasay. The first night, known as the Performance Night, showed the final performances of the Top 6 Scholars, overseen by both the mentors and the resident judges. Unlike the past Gala Nights, however, the performances were only for the appeal for votes. This show also saw performances from the hosts and the other scholars who left the academy (Honorary Scholar Poy Palma was present and was with the other scholars, but Ross Dio and Jet Singh were absent).

The next night, dubbed the Awards Night, Vina Morales and Wency Cornejo performed with the scholars (again including Poy and excluding Jet and Ross) in their opening number. The show also included an early Christmas number by the show's Little Dreamers and several children from Childhope Asia Philippines, as well as a song and dance performance from Billy Crawford and the female mainstays of the upcoming comedy show Banana Split.

Among the Top 6 Scholars, Bugoy Drilon, Laarni Lozada, and Miguel Mendoza were declared the Top Three. Of the Three, Laarni was declared the winner. She takes home a condominium unit, a business package from Crystal Clear worth P1,500,000, appliances, Sony products and P1,000,000 cash. Bugoy declared the first runner-up and received P500,000 including products from Sony and Whirlpool, while Miguel declared the second runner-up and received P300,000 including products from Sony and Whirlpool.

All votes were gathered from the start of the open voting from the night of August 30 to 2:00 pm of September 14. This table shows the summary of votes as obtained by each of the Top 6 Scholars in the Awards Night.

Event	Big 6	Votes		Result
Event	Big 6	Actual Votes	Percentage	Result
Grand Dream Nights	Laarni	651,696	35.21%	Winner
Grand Dream Nights	Bugoy	549,760	29.70%	Runner-Up
Grand Dream Nights	Miguel	253,402	13.69%	3rd Place
Grand Dream Nights	Liezel	247,346	13.36%	4th Place
Grand Dream Nights	Van	112,065	6.06%	5th Place
Grand Dream Nights	Cristina	36,487	1.97%	6th Place
TOTAL VOTES		1,850,756 votes	99.99%	—N/a

== Little Dreamers ==
The Little Dreamers competition was started on July 6, 2008, for children who are six to ten years old. Twelve children were chosen to compete in this side competition, taking place within the duration of this season. Understandably, they do not stay at the academy due to regular schooling on weekdays, entering it during weekends to have voice lessons from the Voice Mentors.
