= Myx Music Awards 2013 =

Annual Philippine music awards ceremony

- Date: March 20, 2013
- Location: Music Museum, Greenhills Shopping Center, San Juan
- Presented by: Pupil and Jay R
- Most wins: Abra and Gloc-9
- Most nominations: Gloc-9

Television/radio coverage
- Network: Myx; Studio 23
- Produced by: Myx

Myx Music Awards 2013 was the 8th Myx Music Awards, an annual music awards ceremony established in 2006. Hosted by Myx video jockeys, it was broadcast on Myx and Studio 23. Gloc-9 led the nominations with eight nominations across seven categories. The nominees were announced on February 18, 2013, followed by the awards ceremony on March 20. As with the 2012 ceremony, fans could vote for nominees through the Myx website and its official Twitter and Facebook channels.

== Hosts ==
- Chino Lui Pio
- Iya Villania
- Kristine Camille Antonio
- Michelle Ng
- Nikki Gil

== Performers ==
The ceremony featured performances by Anja Aguilar, Beatbox Philippines, Hilera, Sam Concepcion, Nikki Gil, Typecast, Jose Amarra, Quest Princess Velasco, Neocolours, Robin Nievera, KZ Tandingan, Kean Cipriano, Kamikazee, Elmo Magalona, Richard Poon, Yeng Constantino, and Zendee.

== Winners and nominees ==
Abra and Gloc-9 were the ceremony's most-awarded artists, receiving a combined total of five awards at the 2013 Myx Music Awards.

Winners are listed first and highlighted in boldface.

Favorite Music Video	Favorite Song
**"Gayuma" – Abra feat. Thyro and Jeriko Aguilar (Director: Abra, Christian Escolano, Jasper Salimbangon)**; "12:51" – Krissy and Ericka (Director: Nani Naguit); "Pag-ibig" – Yeng Constantino (Director: Mackie Galvez); "Sige Lang" – Quest (Director: Nolan Bernardino); Sirena – Gloc-9 feat. Ebe Dancel (Director: J. Pacena II)	**"Sirena" – Gloc-9 feat. Ebe Dancel**; "12:51" – Krissy and Ericka; "I'll Be There" – Julie Anne San Jose; "Moving Closer" – Never The Strangers; "Sige Lang" – Quest
Favorite Artist	Favorite Female Artist
**Sarah Geronimo**; Callalily; Christian Bautista; Gloc-9; Yeng Constantino	**Yeng Constantino**; Angeline Quinto; Julie Anne San Jose; Sarah Geronimo; Zia Quizon
Favorite Male Artist	Favorite Group
**Christian Bautista**; Abra; Bamboo; Gloc-9; Rico Blanco	**Callalily**; Kamikazee; Krissy and Ericka; Never The Strangers; Sponge Cola
Favorite Mellow Video	Favorite Rock Video
**"I'll Be There" – Julie Anne San Jose (Director: Mark Reyes)**; "12:51" – Krissy and Ericka (Director: Nani Naguit); "Bakit Mahal Pa Rin Kita" – Erik Santos (Director: Nani Naguit); "Dear Lonely" – Zia Quizon (Director: Nani Naguit); "In Love With You" – Christian Bautista and Angeline Quinto (Director: Treb Monteras II)	**"Huling Sayaw" – Kamikazee feat. Kyla (Director: Avid Liongoren)**; "Amats" – Rico Blanco (Director: Marla Ancheta, Rico Blanco); "Ikot Ng Mundo" – Bamboo (Director: Treb Monteras II); "Reverend's Daughter" – Typecast (Director: Pedring Lopez); "Sandata" – Wolfgang (Director: Miguel Olfindo)
Favorite Urban Video	Favorite New Artist
**"Gayuma" – Abra feat. Thyro and Jeriko Aguilar (Director: Abra, Cristhian Escolano, Jasper Salimbangon)**; "Sige Lang" – Quest (Director: Nolan Bernardino); "Sirena" – Gloc-9 feat. Ebe Dancel (Director: J. Pacena II); "Tao Lang" – Loonie feat. Quest (Director: Cristhian Escolano); "Your Name" – Young JV feat. Myrtle (Director: Nolan Bernardino)	**Daniel Padilla**; Abra; Julie Anne San Jose; Never The Strangers; Robin Nievera
Favorite Collaboration	Favorite Remake
**"Sirena" – Gloc-9 feat. Ebe Dancel**; "Bakit Hindi" – Gloc-9 feat. Billy Crawford; "Huling Sayaw" – Kamikazee feat. Kyla; "In Love With You" – Christian Bautista and Angeline Quinto; "XGF" – Sponge Cola feat. Chito Miranda and Los Magno	**"Bakit Pa Ba" – Sarah Geronimo**; "Minsan" – Callalily; "Prinsesa" – Daniel Padilla; "Urong Sulong" – Bea Binene; "Your Love" – Paulo Avelino
Favorite Media Soundtrack	Favorite Guest Appearance in a Music Video
**"Moving Closer" – Never The Strangers**; "Minsan" – Callalily; "Nag-Iisang Bituin" – Christian Bautista; "Tuloy" – Sarah Geronimo, Somedaydream and Gary Valenciano; "Walang Hanggan" – Gary Valenciano	**Elmo Magalona ("I'll Be There" – Julie Anne San Jose)**; Alodia Gosengfiao ("Hey Hey Alodia" – Segatron); Anne Curtis ("XGF" – Sponge Cola feat. Chito Miranda and Los Magno); Marian Rivera ("My Everything" – Down To Mars); Slater Young ("Bakit Ba Minamahal Kita" – Angeline Quinto)
Favorite Myx Celebrity VJ	Favorite Myx Live! Performance
**Julie Anne San Jose**; Bea Binene; Daniel Padilla; Paulo Avelino; Xian Lim	**Gloc-9**; Aiza Seguerra; Christian Bautista; Kamikazee; Noel Cabangon
Favorite International Video	Favorite K-Pop Video
**"One Thing" – One Direction**; "Boyfriend" – Justin Bieber; "Part Of Me" – Katy Perry; "Payphone" – Maroon 5 feat. Wiz Khalifa; "We Are Never Getting Back Together" – Taylor Swift	**"Sexy, Free & Single" – Super Junior**; "Gangnam Style" – Psy; "I Love You" – 2NE1; "Monster" – BIG BANG; "Twinkle" – SNSD-TaeTiSeo
Myx Magna Awardee
**Lea Salonga**
