= 12:51 =

12:51 may refer to:

- "12:51" (Krissy & Ericka song), 2012
  - Twelve: Fifty One, an album by Krissy & Ericka, 2012
- "12:51" (The Strokes song), 2003

== See also ==
- 1251
