= Sige Lang =

2012 single by Quest

Single by Quest
- Language: Filipino
- Released: June 2012
- Genre: Pinoy hip hop • R&B • inspirational pop rap
- Length: 4:30
- Label: Warner Music Philippines
- Songwriter: Quest
- Producers: Quest, Bojam (FlipMusic)

Music video
- "Sige Lang" on YouTube

"Sige Lang" is an inspirational Pinoy hip hop song by Filipino singer-songwriter Quest. Released in June 2012 as a carrier single under Warner Music Philippines, the track was arranged in collaboration with producer Bojam (Bryan Yabut) of FlipMusic.

== Background and composition ==
Quest wrote "Sige Lang" with the intention of inspiring Filipinos amidst daily struggles and adversities. The song features an arrangement co-produced by Bojam of FlipMusic, combining hip-hop beats with uplifting, empowering lyrics. It was distributed digitally via iTunes and mymusicstore.ph under Warner Music Philippines.

== Chart performance ==
Following its release, "Sige Lang" quickly gained airplay across various radio and television outlets. The song peaked at No. 1 on three separate Myx music charts: Myx Daily Top 10, Pinoy Myx Countdown, and the Myx Hit Chart. Metro Manila radio station Magic 89.9 also named "Sige Lang" as its "OPM Song of the Year" for 2012.

Chart (2012)	Peak position
Myx Daily Top 10	1
Pinoy Myx Countdown	1
Myx Hit Chart	1

== Use as Gilas Pilipinas anthem ==
In 2014, "Sige Lang" served as the official anthem for Gilas Pilipinas, the Philippine men's national basketball team, during their historic campaign for the 2014 FIBA Basketball World Cup in Spain. On August 17, 2014, an official "Road to Spain" music video was released featuring highlight clips of the team set to Quest's song.

== Accolades ==
Year	Award Ceremony	Category	Nominees/Work	Result	Ref.
2013	Myx Music Awards	Favorite Song	"Sige Lang"	Nominated	
2013	Myx Music Awards	Favorite Music Video	"Sige Lang" (Director: Nolan Bernardino)	Nominated	
2013	Myx Music Awards	Favorite Urban Video	"Sige Lang" (Director: Nolan Bernardino)	Nominated	
2017	Awit Awards	Best Rap/HipHop Recording	"Sige Lang" (Quest / Warner Music Philippines)	Nominated	
