= 12:51 (Krissy & Ericka song) =

2012 single by Krissy & Ericka

Single by Krissy & Ericka

from the album Twelve: Fifty One
- Released: January 2012
- Genre: Acoustic
- Length: 4:06
- Label: MCA Music
- Songwriter: Krissy Villongco

Music video
- "12:51" on YouTube

"12:51" is the is the lead single from the second studio album, Twelve: Fifty One (2012), by the pop-acoustic duo Krissy & Ericka.

== Background and composition ==
Krissy Villongco wrote the song "12:51" over a period of two years. According to Villongco, she wrote the song's initial verse and chorus at exactly 12:51 a.m. and completed the bridge on her way to the recording studio. She also said that the background behind the song was about someone she liked and thought also liked her but was actually with someone else, and the feeling of moving on.

== Music video ==
A teaser was first released on YouTube on January 23, 2012. The music video of the song, which was directed by Nani Naguit, was first premiered on Myx on January 29. It was then uploaded to YouTube on January 29. Ericka Villongco was also involved behind the scenes on the music video. On YouTube, it was one of the most-searched videos for 2012, making the top 10.

== Live performances ==
Krissy & Ericka performed the song at David Choi's live tour in Manila as an opening act for his show. Krissy also performed the song solo as an opening act for Dean's concert in the Philippines in 2016.

== Chart performance ==
The single debuted at number 6 on the Philippine Charts and later entered the top 10 of the Myx Daily Top 10.

== Critical reception ==
=== Accolades ===
Awards and nominations for "12:51"
Year	Award	Category	Result	Refs.
2013	Myx Music Awards	Favorite Song	Nominated	
2013	Myx Music Awards	Favorite Music Video	Nominated	
2013	Myx Music Awards	Favorite Mellow Video	Nominated	
2013	Awit Awards	Best Performance by a Group Recording Artists	Won	
2013	Awit Awards	Song of the Year	Nominated	
2013	Awit Awards	Best Ballad Recording	Nominated	
