= Quest (singer) =

Filipino musical artist

Jose Villanueva III
- Also known as: Quest
- Born: Jose Villanueva III; January 12, 1982 (age 44); Las Piñas, Philippines
- Genres: Hip hop, R&B
- Instruments: Vocals, keyboards
- Years active: 2009–present
- Labels: Independent (2010–2015); Warner Music Philippines (2015–present)

Jose Villanueva III (born January 12, 1982), better known as Quest, is a Filipino singer, rapper, songwriter, and producer known for his song "Sige Lang" in 2012 which was selected as "National Fight Song" for the basketball team Gilas Pilipinas. Quest is a hip-hop and R&B singer wherein he won 'Best Urban Music Video for 2010' at the Myx Music Awards for his first single "Back to Love".

== Early life ==
Born Jose Villanueva III on January 12, 1982, in Quezon City, he is the son of Joel Villanueva and Diana Villanueva, and grandson of Jose Villanueva Sr. Villanueva have five sisters namely Ana, Mary Adelene, Ana Cassandra, Michaela, and Nalina Sky.

== Career ==
Quest honed his craft as a lead vocalist and music ministry director at the Fort location of the Christian church Victory in Manila. He left in 2007 to pursue a full-time career in music. In 2009, Quest started recording Flip Music with Jumbo de Belen without abandoning his contemporary Christian music roots. He soon collaborated with Filipino actor and singer Sam Milby, whom he met in church, in marketing and producing his debut album.

In 2015, Quest signed a recording deal with Warner Music Philippines. His second album, Life of a Champion, was released on May 20, 2016 and won Album Of The Year at the 2017 Awit Awards.

In 2019, Quest signed a new recording contract with Warner Music Philippines again. Together with John Roa, they released a single in 2022 titled "Infinity" under the said label. The single follows Quest's recently released Permanente EP and Roa's remix project with Jarlo Bâse's "Kalapati."

== Discography ==
=== Albums ===
- Revolution (2010)
- Life of a Champion (2016)
- Dream Awake (2019)

=== EPs ===
- Para Sayo (2021)
- Permanente (2022)

=== Singles ===
- "Back to Love"
- "Party Life"
- "Sige Lang"
- "Saludo"
- "One Day"
- "No Greater Love" feat. Clara Benin
- "Walang Hanggan"
- "Unang Hakbang"
- "Tagay"
- "Sasamahan KIta"
- "Permanente" feat. Kiana Valenciano"
- "Unang Hakbang" feat. Keiko Necesario
- "Kalawakan" feat. Aicelle Santos

=== Featured singles ===
- "Tao Lang" (with Loonie)
- "Dati" (with Sam Concepcion and Tippy Dos Santos)
- "Infinity" (with John Roa)

== Awards and nominations ==
| Award ceremony | Year | Category | Nominee(s)/work(s) | Result | Ref. |
|---|---|---|---|---|---|
| Myx Music Awards | 2010 | Best Urban Music Video | "Back to Love" | Won | |
| Awit Awards | 2016 | Best Inspirational Song | "Higher" | Won | |
| Awit Awards | 2016 | Album of the Year | Life of a Champion | Won | |
| Wish Music Awards | 2018 | Wishclusive R&B Performance of the Year | "Walang Hanggan" | Nominated | |
