= Twelve: Fifty One =

Studio album by Krissy & Ericka
- Released: January 24, 2012
- Recorded: 2011–12
- Genres: International, Pop, Acoustic
- Label: MCA Music

Krissy & Ericka chronology
Krissy & Ericka (2009)	Twelve: Fifty One (2012)

Twelve: Fifty One is the second album released by pop-acoustic duo Krissy & Ericka under the label MCA Music. The album's promotional single, "12:51," debuted at number six on the Philippine Charts.

The album was only available in Philippines, Singapore, and Malaysia After 1 week of release. Candy featured an interview with Krissy and Ericka about their album.

== Singles ==
The single "12:51" was the official lead single and promotional single for the album.

== Reception ==
=== Critical response ===
Professional ratings
Review scores
Source	Rating
Spin Or Bin	3.5/5 stars
Pop Culture	3/5 stars

The album received favorable reviews. A review on Spin or Bin stated that the reviewers liked the album and were looking forward to hearing more original music from the duo, rating it 3.5 stars. Pop Culture rated the album 3 out of 5 stars, questioning the originality of the group's style of covering songs in an acoustic style and noting that the album has "not much in terms of guitar work, but a lot in terms of their honeyed voices."

== Track listing ==
Most of the songs recorded were their own covers of some popular songs, by artists such as Adele, Katy Perry, and Taylor Swift.

No.	Title	Writer(s)	Length
1.	"Rewind" (featuring AJ Rafael)	Krissy Villongco; Ericka Villongco	3:38
2.	"Rolling in the Deep"	Paul Epworth; Adele Adkins	5:02
3.	"12:51"	Krissy Villongco	4:06
4.	"That Should Be Me"	Nasri Atweh; Adam Messinger; Luke Gottwald; Justin Bieber	4:17
5.	"Last Friday Night (T.G.I.F.)"	Katy Perry; Lukasz Gottwald; Max Martin; Bonnie McKee	3:51
6.	"Back to December"	Taylor Swift	4:55
7.	"In Your Arms"	Krissy Villongco	4:04
8.	"Rocketeer" (featuring The Lamars)	Jonathan James Yip; Jeremy L Reeves; Ray Romulus; Philip Lawrence; Bruno Mars; James Roh; Choung Jae; Kevin Nishimura; Verman Coquia	3:38
9.	"Love the Way You Lie 2"	Marshall Mathers; H Haffermann; Alex Grant	3:38
10.	"Anything" (featuring Marié Digby)	Marié Digby	4:27
Total length:			44:5
