= Krissy & Ericka =

Filipino pop-acoustic music duo

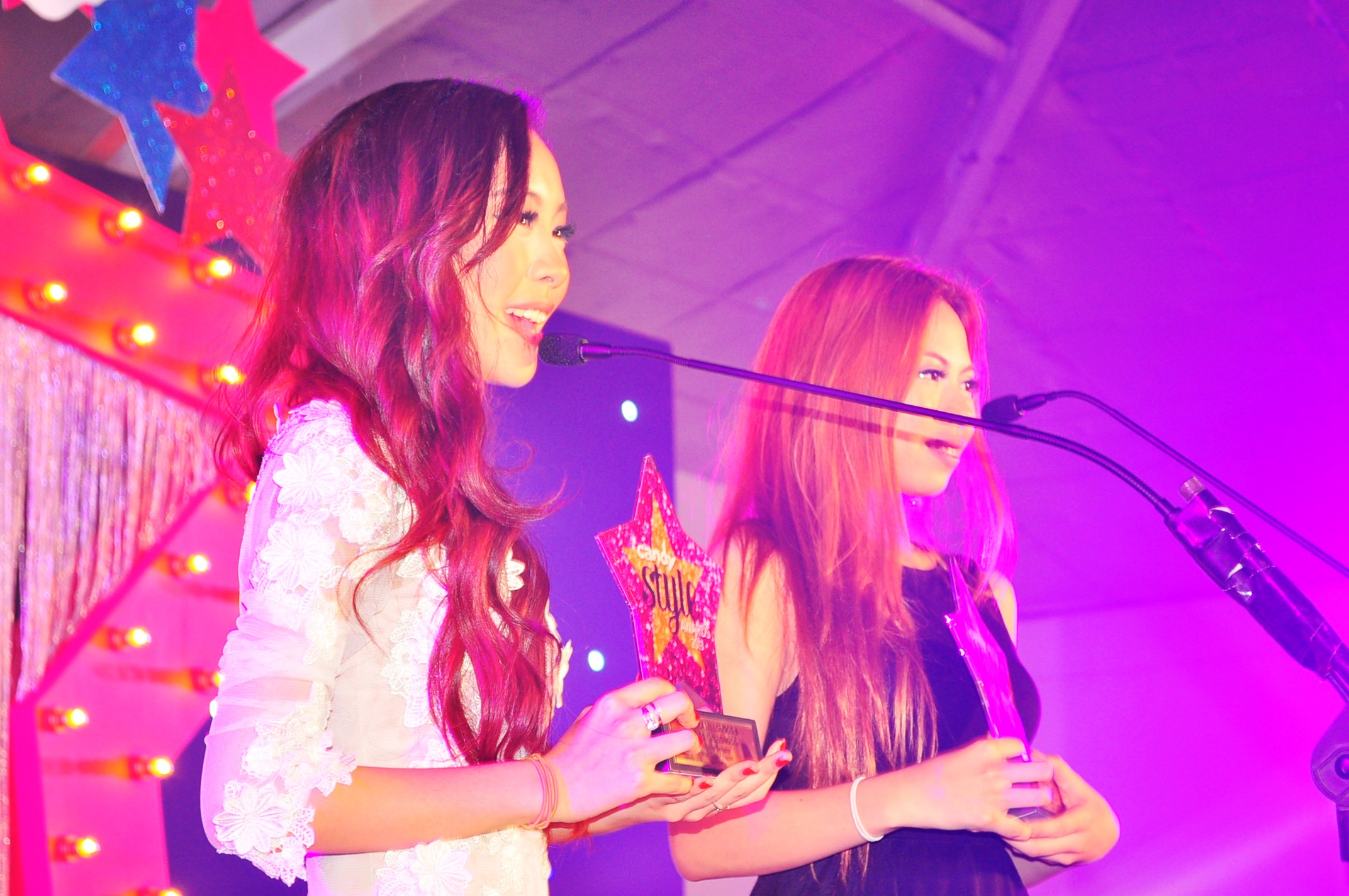
- Ericka & Krissy Villongco at the 2013 Candy Style Awards

Background information
- Origin: Philippines
- Genres: Pop, acoustic, country pop
- Years active: 2008–present
- Labels: MCA Music, Universal Music Group; Star Magic (2008–2012); Management: Cornerstone Talent Management
- Members: Krissy Villongco; Ericka Villongco
- Website: https://www.youtube.com/user/krissysings

Krissy & Ericka are a Filipino acoustic-pop music duo.

== History ==
Krissy and Ericka Villongco are sisters. Ericka was born 10 months earlier than Krissy. Her cousin, Cris Villonco, is also a stage actress and singer. They began singing at a young age. Krissy also appeared on the ABS-CBN competition show Little Big Star, competing against Jake Zyrus (then known as Charice Pempengco) and Sam Concepcion. They first appeared on YouTube in 2007 doing acoustic covers. They were then signed to MCA Music.

In 2009, they released their self-titled debut album under MCA Records. It included the singles "Up Up, Down Down" and "Don't Say You Love Me".

In 2012, their cover of Taylor Swift's "Sparks Fly", made with AJ Rafael, was shown on American radio personality Ryan Seacrest's website. They then released a single titled "12:51" as the lead single for their second album, Twelve: Fifty One. Twelve: Fifty One was released later that year featuring collaborations with AJ Rafael and Marié Digby. In 2014, Krissy released her first solo single "We Can't Be". She then released a solo album, Krissy's Songs About You.

== Other ventures ==
Ericka has pursued acting, appearing in the 2014 film Relaks, It's Just Pag-ibig. She also served in politics at a young age as the SK Kagawad in Barangay Greenhills and ran for councilor in San Juan during the 2016 elections.

== Personal life ==
Ericka was in a relationship with actor James Reid for three years. They broke up in 2014. In 2019, she got engaged to Ross Sauve. She continues to make content on YouTube as an influencer, focusing on beauty and lifestyle content.

Both sisters have relocated to the US. Ericka graduated cum laude with a nursing degree in 2025.

== Discography ==
=== Albums ===
- Krissy & Ericka (2009)
- Twelve: Fifty One (2012)

=== Singles ===
- "Up Up, Down Down" (2009)
- "Runaway" (2010)
- "Don't Say You Love Me" (2010)
- "12:51" (2012)
- "In Your Arms" (2012)
- "We can't be (2014)

== Awards and nominations ==
Year	Nominated work	Award	Nomination	Result
2011	"Surf's Up"	23 Awit Awards	Best Performance by a New Group Recording Artists	Won
