= San Juan, Metro Manila =

Highly urbanized city in Metro Manila, Philippines

San Juan
- Highly urbanized city
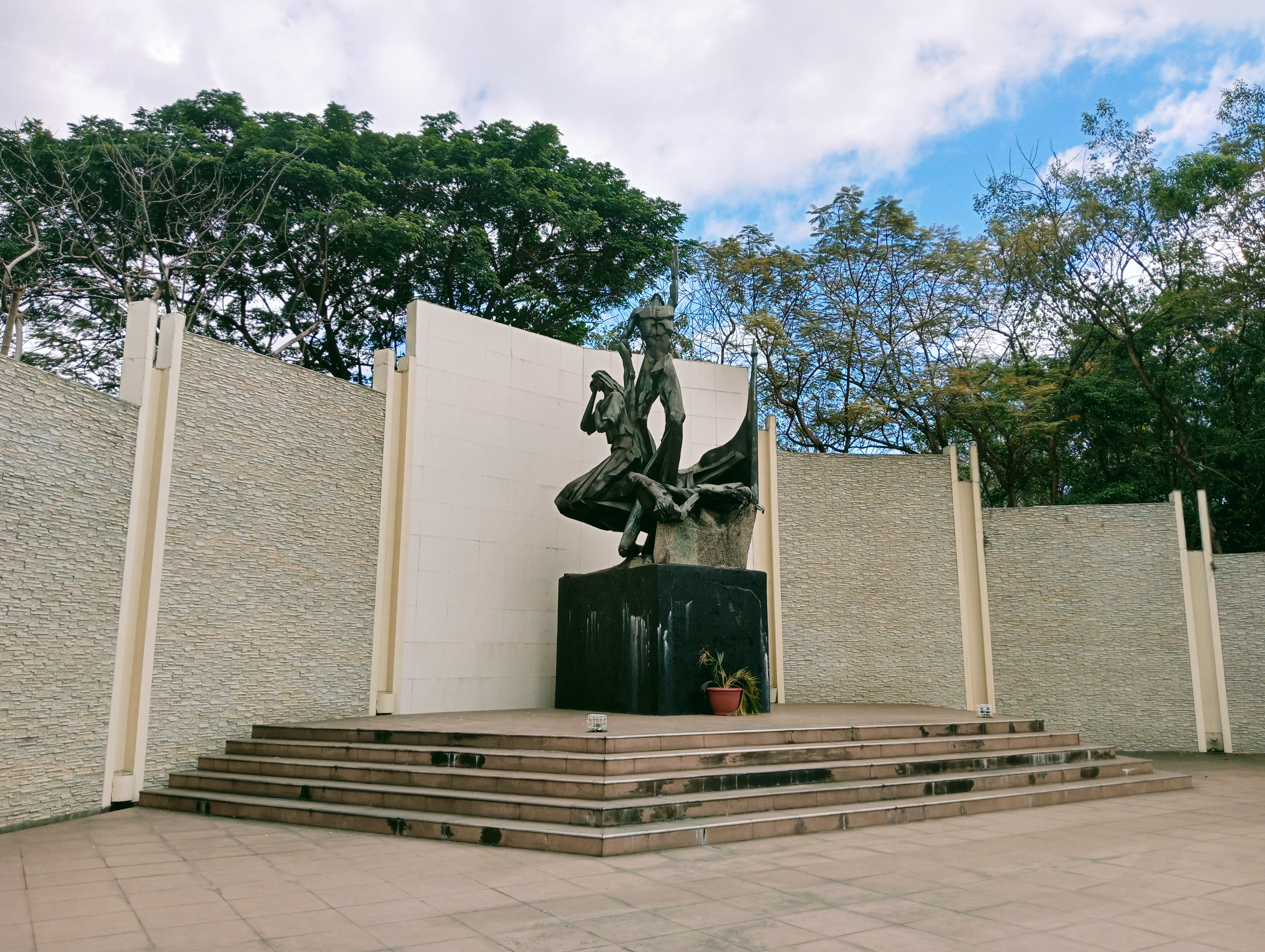
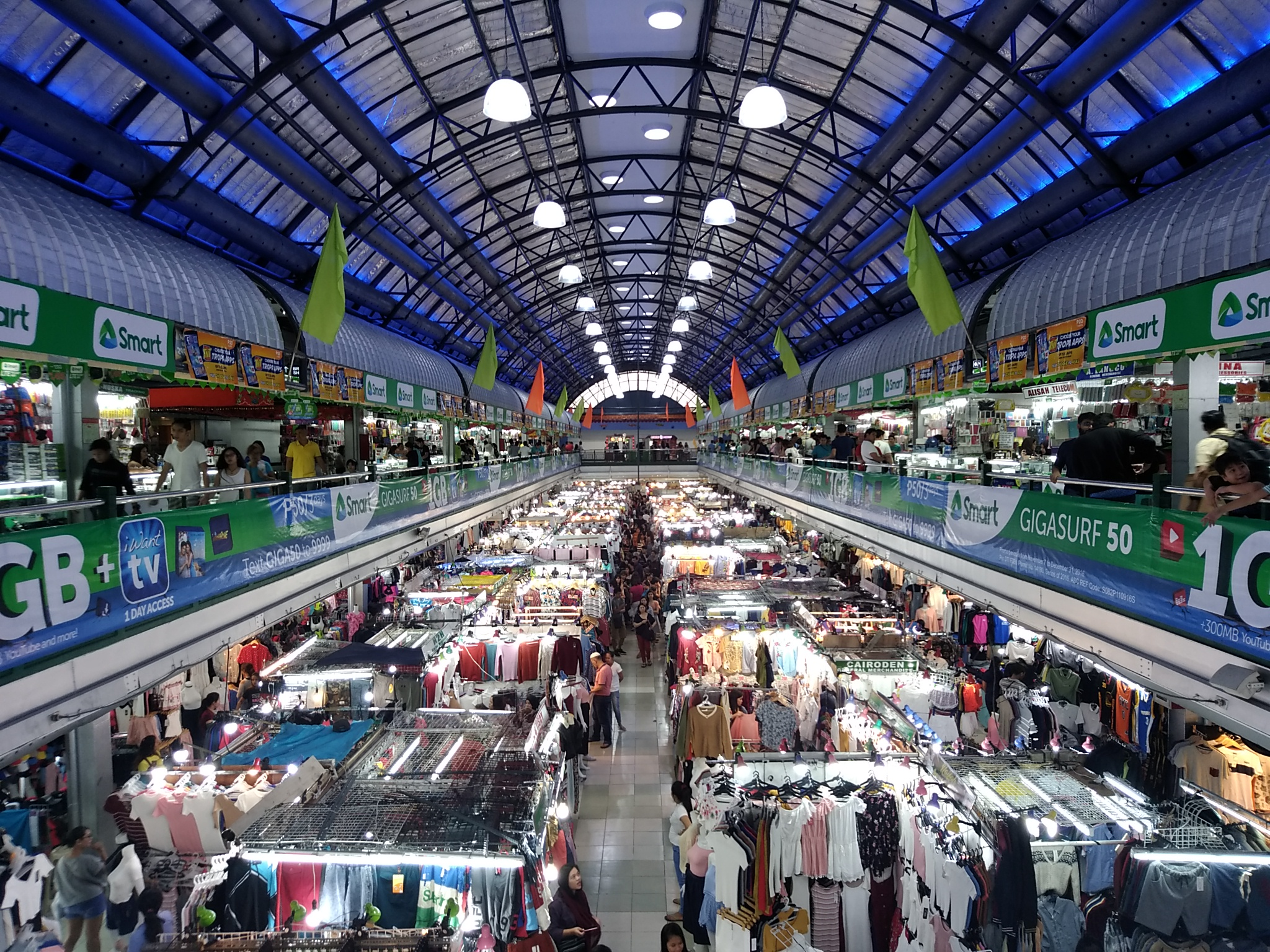
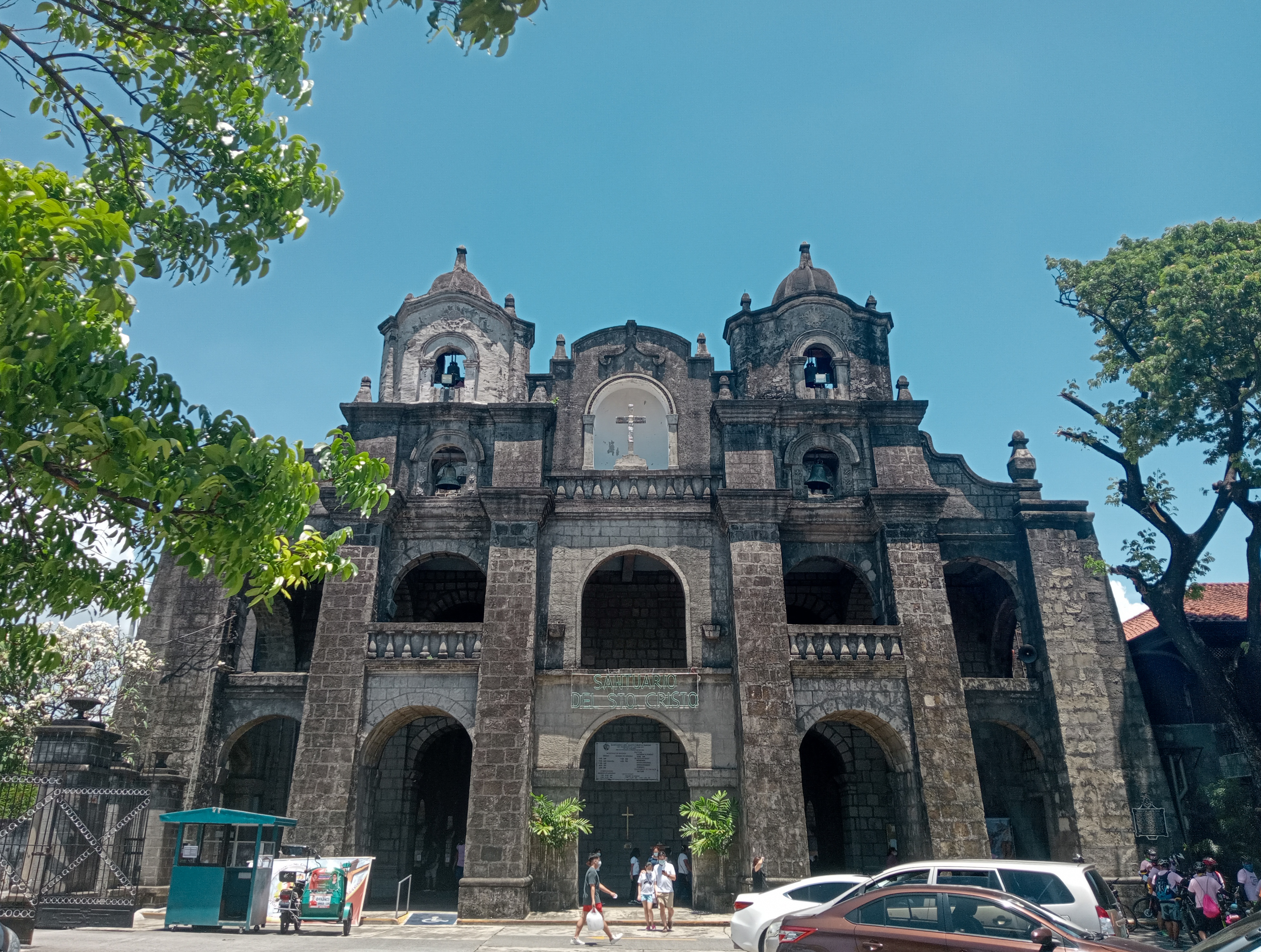
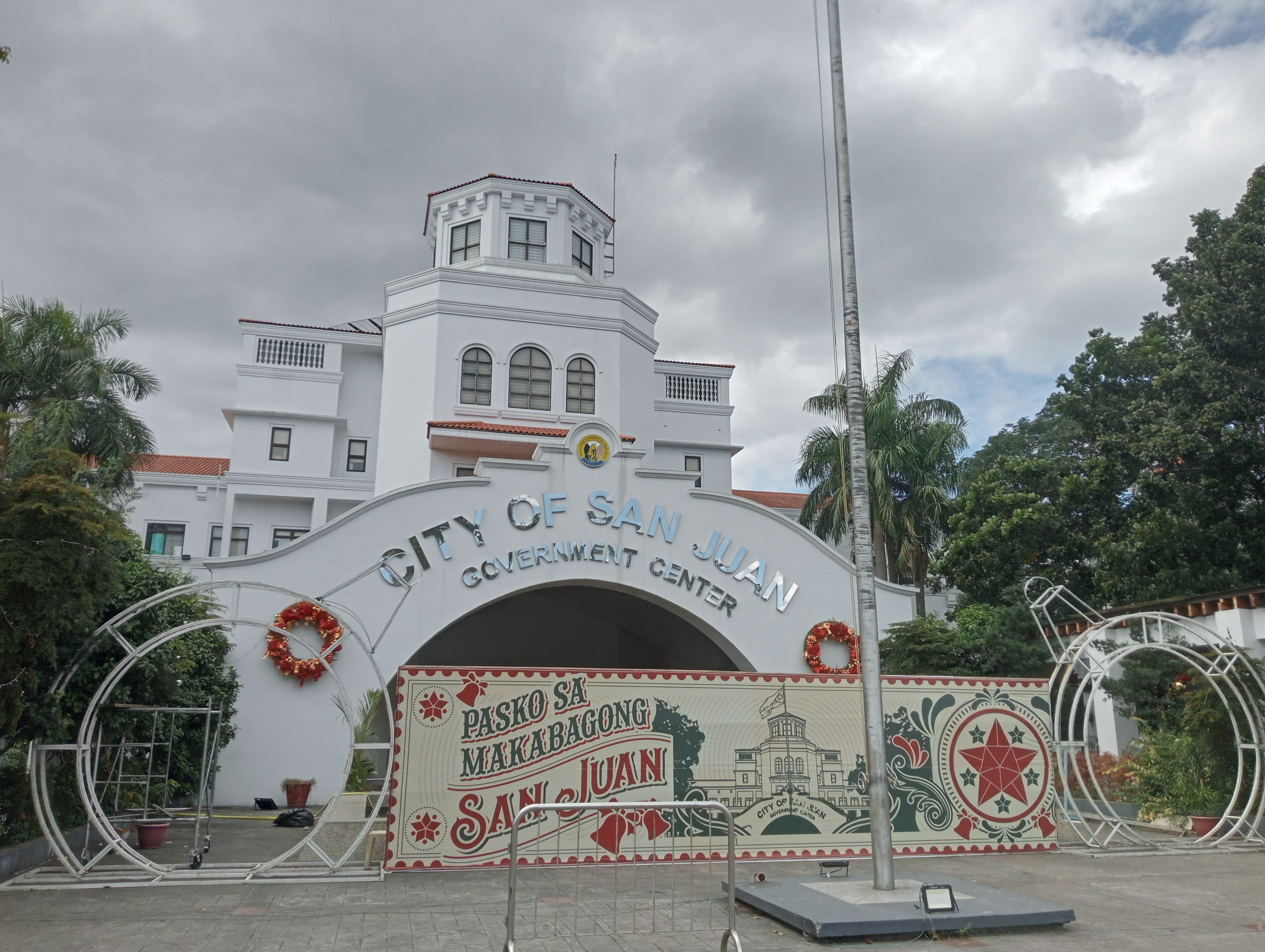
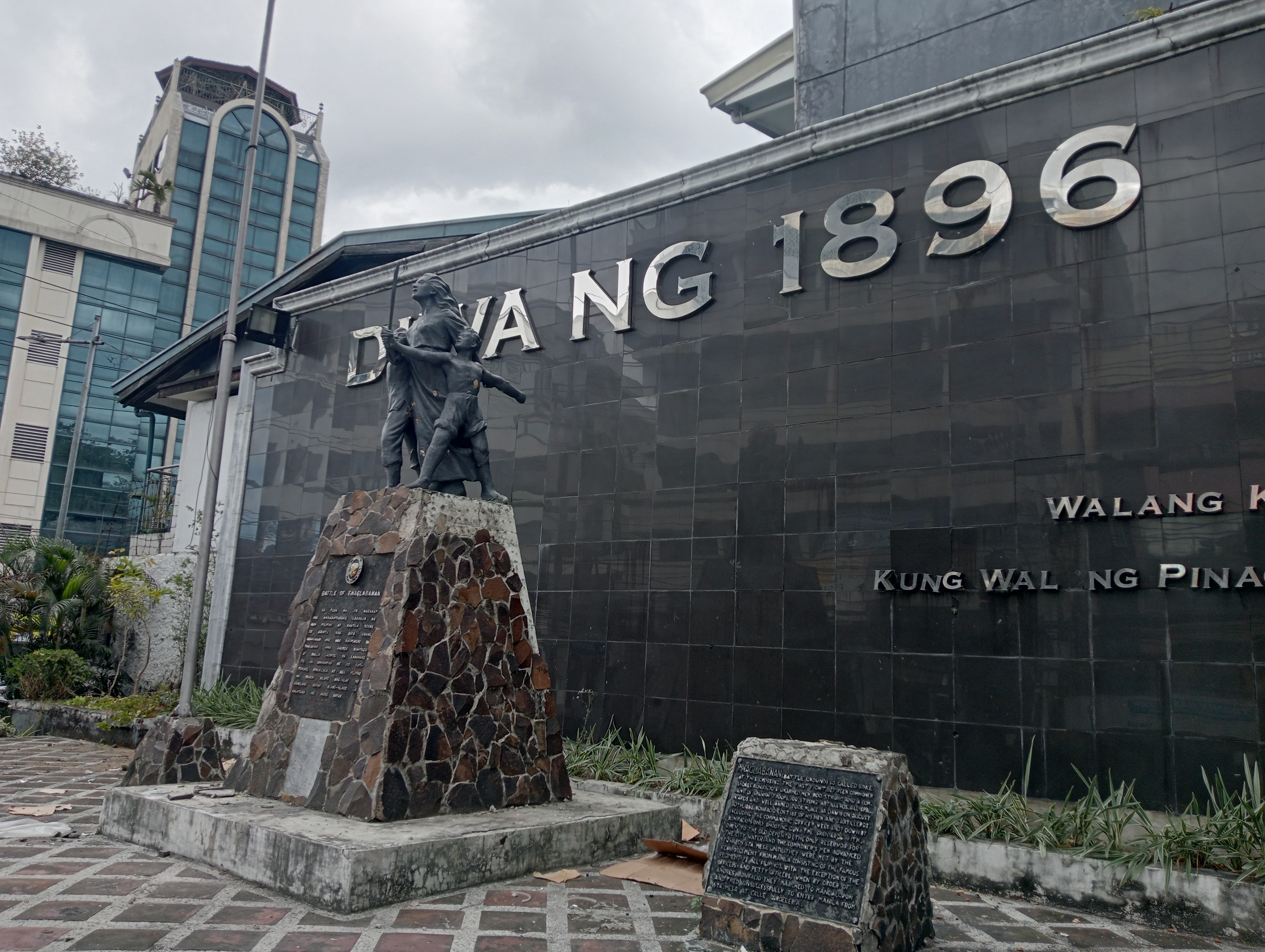
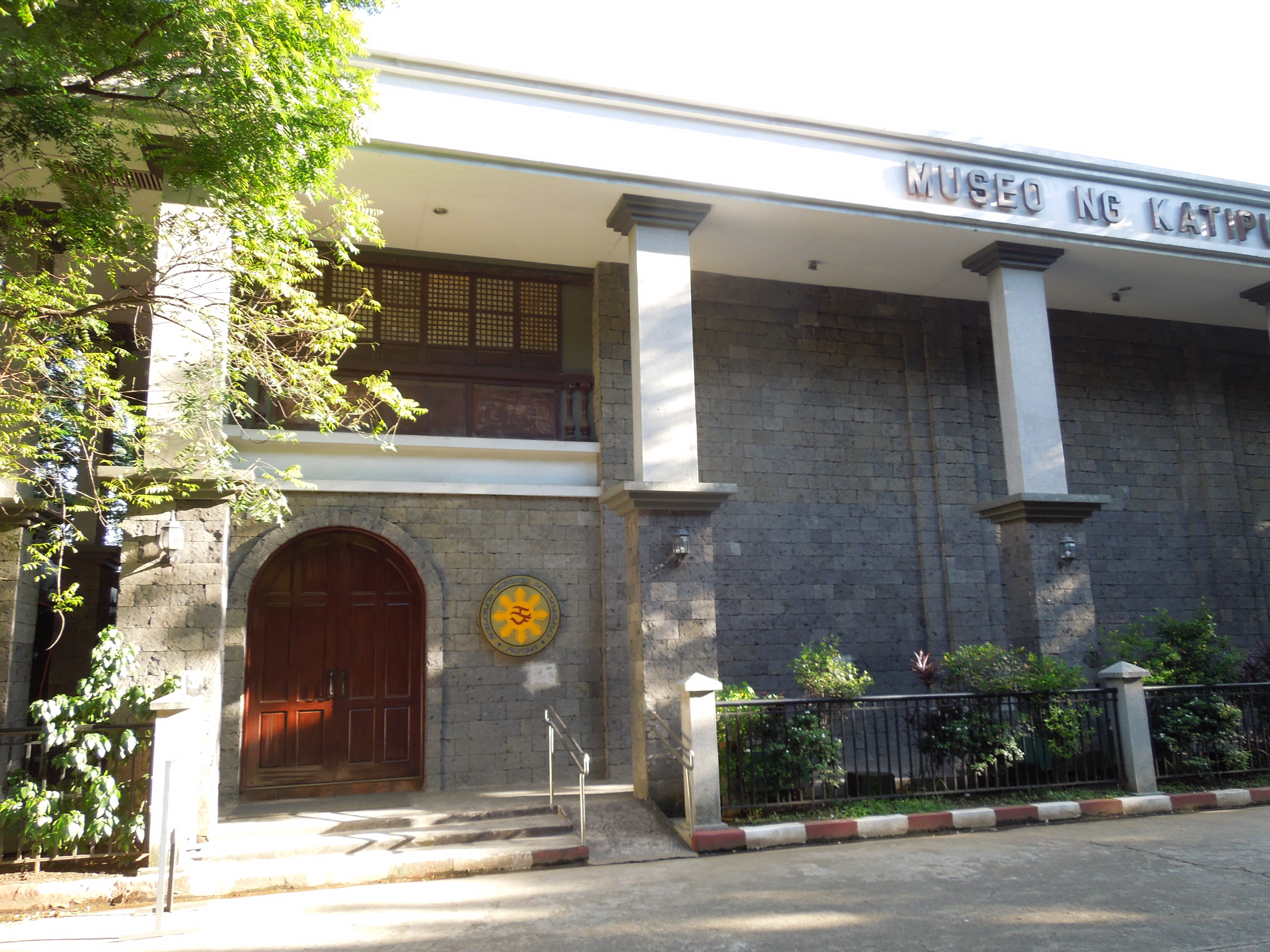
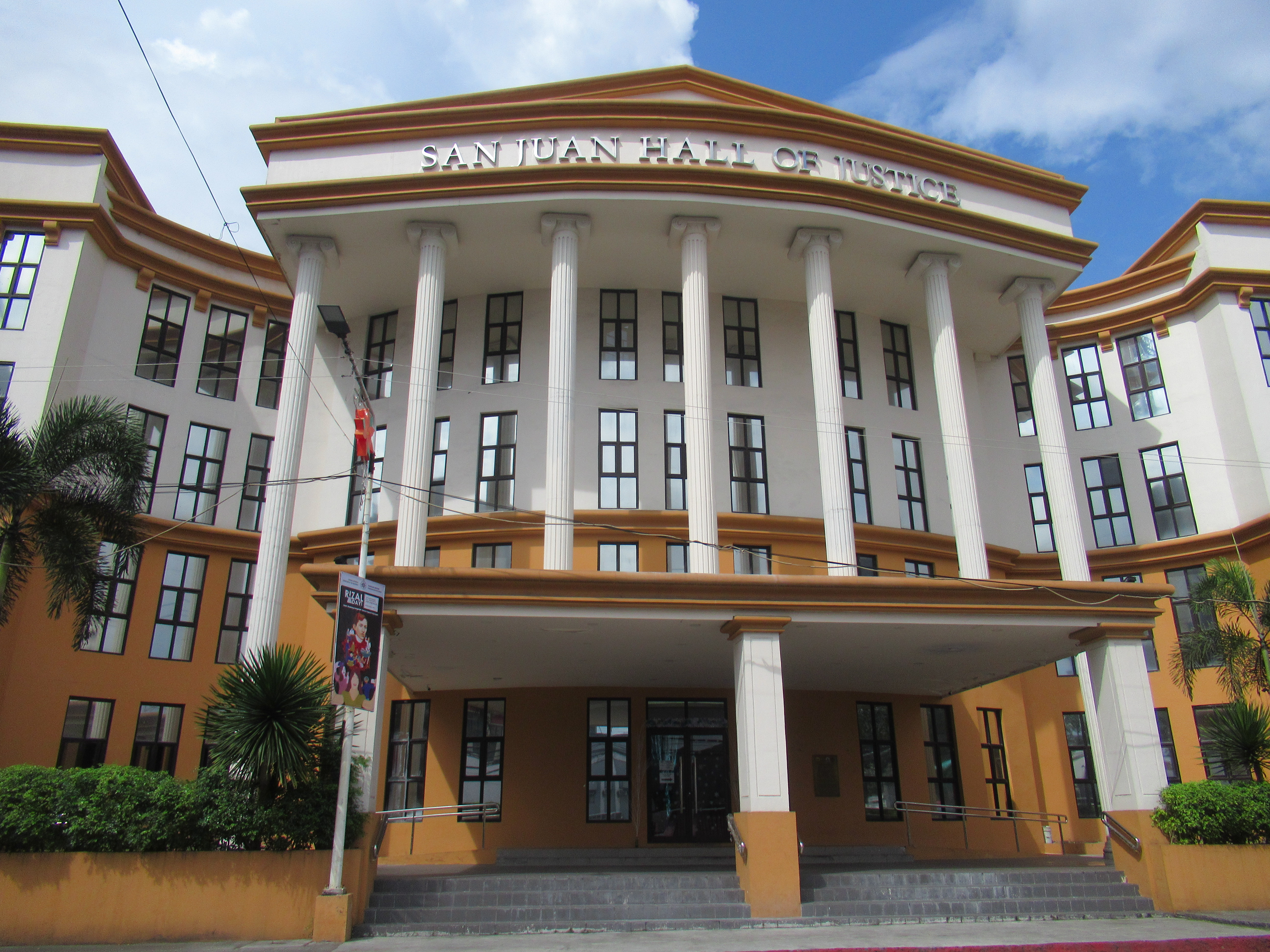
- Pinaglabanan Shrine Greenhills Santuario del Santo Cristo City Hall of San Juan Diwa ng 1896 Monument Museo ng Katipunan Hall of Justice

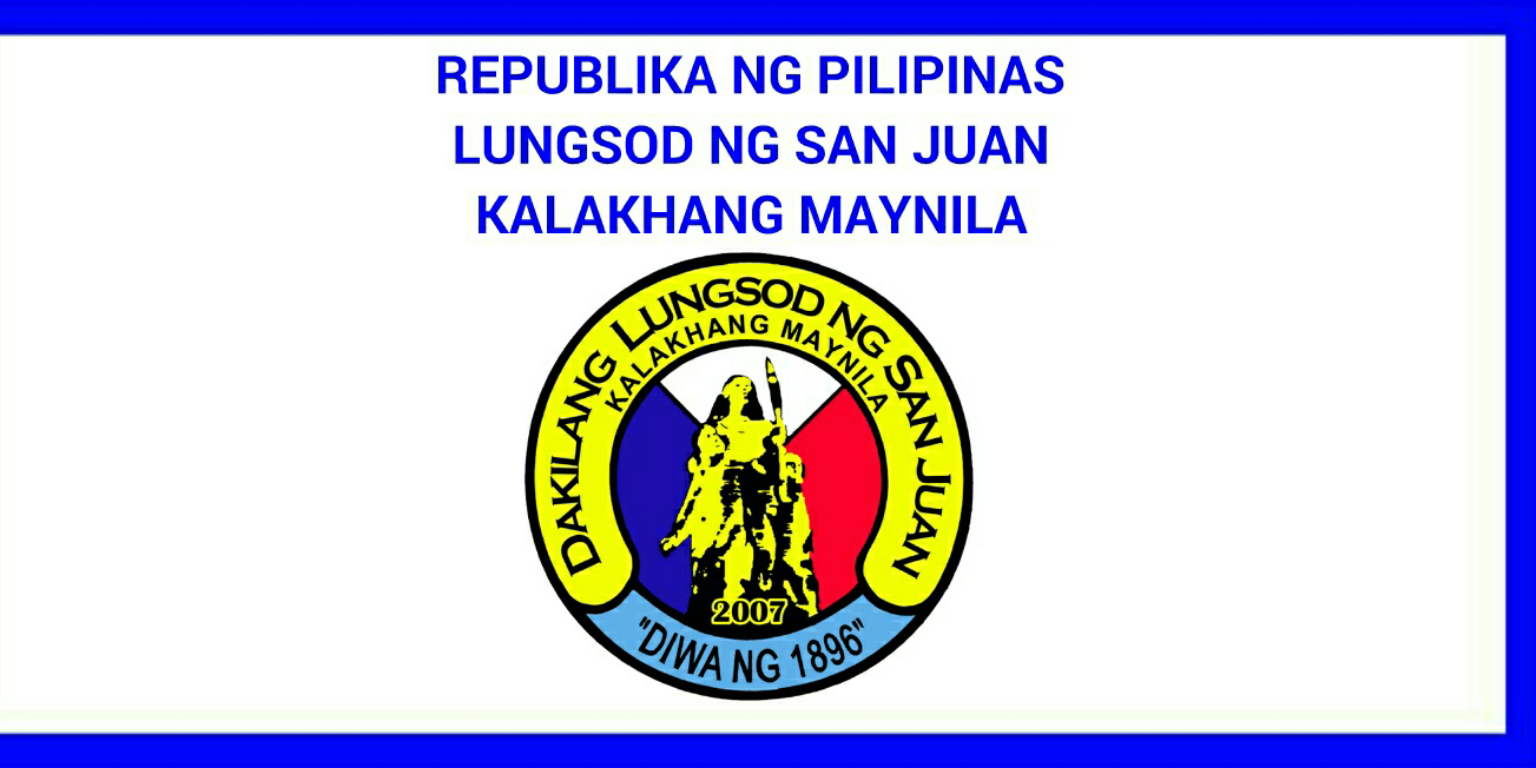
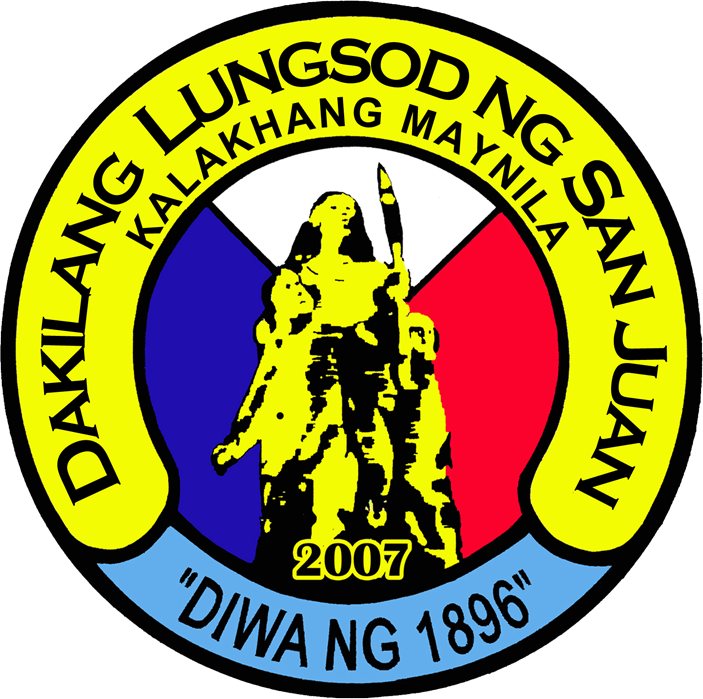
- Flag Seal
- Nickname(s): Dakilang Lungsód ng San Juan (Great City of San Juan), The Heart of Metro Manila
- Mottoes: Diwa ng 1896 ("Spirit of 1896"); Makabagong San Juan (Modern San Juan)
- Anthem: San Juan, Sagisag ng Kalayaan (English: San Juan, Symbol of Freedom)
- Map of Metro Manila with San Juan highlighted
- Interactive map of San Juan
- Location within the Philippines
- Coordinates: 14°36′14″N 121°01′48″E
- Country: Philippines
- Region: Metro Manila
- Province: none
- District: Lone district
- Founded: 1783
- Annexation to San Felipe Neri: October 12, 1903
- Chartered: March 27, 1907
- Highly urbanized city (independent city): June 17, 2007
- Named for: St. John the Baptist
- Barangays: 21 (see Barangays)

Government
  - Type: Sangguniang Panlungsod
  - Mayor: Francisco Javier M. Zamora (PFP)
  - Vice Mayor: Jose Angelo Rafael “AAA” E. Agcaoili (PFP)
  - Representative: Atty. Ysabel Maria J. Zamora (Lakas)
  - Councilors: List: 1st District; Paul Anthony D. Artadi (PFP); Ma. Antonia Raissa Dawn H. Laurel-Subijano (PFP); James Carlos A. Yap (PFP); John Ervic M. Vijandre (PFP); Ryan Sheldon G. Llanos Dee (PFP); Jose Ruben S. Tolentino (PFP); 2nd District; Lorenzo Francisco A. Tañada-Yam (PFP); Francis Keith R. Peralta (PFP); Ismael R. Mathay IV (PFP); Bea Celine DL. de Guzman (PFP); Rolando M. Bernardo (PFP); Don Carlos Armand C. Allado (PFP); ABC President; Ramon Nakpíl; SK Federation President; Joseph Christopher Torralba
  - Electorate: 100,639 voters (2025)

Area
  - Total: 5.87 km^{2} (2.27 sq mi)
  - Rank: 145th out of 145
- Elevation: 24 m (79 ft)
- Highest elevation: 136 m (446 ft)
- Lowest elevation: 0 m (0 ft)

Population (2024 census)
  - Total: 134,312
  - Density: 22,900/km^{2} (59,300/sq mi)
  - Households: 31,519
- Demonym(s): San Juaneño (Male); San Juaneña (Female)

Economy
  - Income class: 1st city income class
  - Poverty incidence: 0.8% (2023)
  - Revenue: ₱ 3,101 million (2024)
  - Assets: ₱ 10,488 million (2025)
  - Expenditure: ₱ 2,994 million (2025)
  - Liabilities: ₱ 2,615 million (2024)

Service provider
  - Electricity: Manila Electric Company (Meralco)
- Time zone: UTC+8 (PST)
- PSGC: 1381400000
- IDD : area code: +63 (0)02
- Native languages: Filipino
- Catholic diocese: Archdiocese of Manila
- Patron saint: John the Baptist
- Website: www.sanjuancity.gov.ph

San Juan, officially the City of San Juan (Filipino: Lungsod ng San Juan), is a highly urbanized city in the National Capital Region of the Philippines. According to the 2024 census, it has a population of 134,312 people. It is located in Metro Manila's approximate geographical center, and is the country's smallest city by land area.

The city is known historically for the site of the first battle of the Katipunan, the organization which led the 1896 Philippine Revolution against the Spanish Empire. Notable landmarks today such as the Pinaglabanan Shrine and heritage homes are located in the city. Other locations include Greenhills and Santolan Town Plaza, making the city a major shopping hub with a range of upscale, boutique, and bargain retail.

== Etymology ==
"San Juan" is a contraction of the city's traditional name of San Juan del Monte (lit. 'Saint John of the Mountain'). As with many other places in the Philippines, the name combines a patron saint and a toponym; in this case, Saint John the Baptist with the hilly terrain and relatively higher elevation compared to surrounding areas.

The city's ceremonial name is Dakilang Lungsód ng San Juan (lit. 'Great City of San Juan').

== History ==
=== Early history ===
During the pre-Hispanic period, the area of what is now San Juan was a part of the Kingdom of Namayan, whose last recorded rulers were King Lakan Tagkan and his consort, Bouan.

=== Spanish colonial era ===
In the late 16th century, the kingdom and other polities in the islands were absorbed into the Spanish Crown, with the realm of Namayan christened as the parish of Santa Ana de Sapa. (present-day Santa Ana, Manila) The present area of San Juan was meanwhile re-classified as the small encomienda (town) of San Juan del Monte in 1590.

In 1602, along the Camino de Mandaluyong (now F. Blumentritt Street), the Dominican Order built a novitiate house in the town for their immediate use, where ageing or convalescing friars stayed. Within the area, the Dominicans also constructed a convent and a stone church, the Santuario del Santo Cristo, dedicating it to the Holy Cross. To this day, the thrice-rebuilt church stands on the same site, adjacent to Aquinas School and Dominican College.

Given the isolation that the town had from the city of Manila, the colonial government decided to establish a heavily fortified gunpowder magazine called the Almacén de Pólvora (also known as El Polvorín) in San Juan del Monte in 1771. The gunpowder magazine (located at present-day San Juan Elementary School) was situated along the banks of the Salapang River (now known as Salapán Creek), with access provided by the Camino de Mariquina (now N. Domingo Street), which connected Manila and the nearby barrio of Santa Mesa across the San Juan River Bridge to the pueblo of Mariquina (now Marikina).

==== Municipality established ====
In 1783, San Juan del Monte was promoted to a municipality, separating it from the Santa Ana parish and giving it its own local government as a barrio of the Province of Manila. As a result, the old poblacion at Santuario del Santo Cristo was moved to the Camino de Mariquina, where a new municipal hall (now the San Juan Medical Center) and a town plaza (now the San Juan Plaza Mayor) was constructed.

In 1892, Father Bernardino Nozaleda, the Archbishop of Manila, approved the creation of a new parish for the municipality of San Juan del Monte, with the Franciscans establishing the San Juan Bautista Church (now Pinaglabanan Church) and a parochial house in the area now known as Pinaglabanan Street.

==== The Philippine Revolution ====
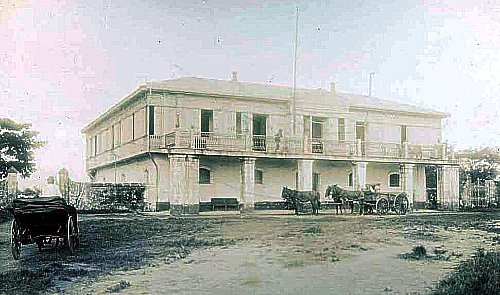
The El Deposito water reservoir in 1900.

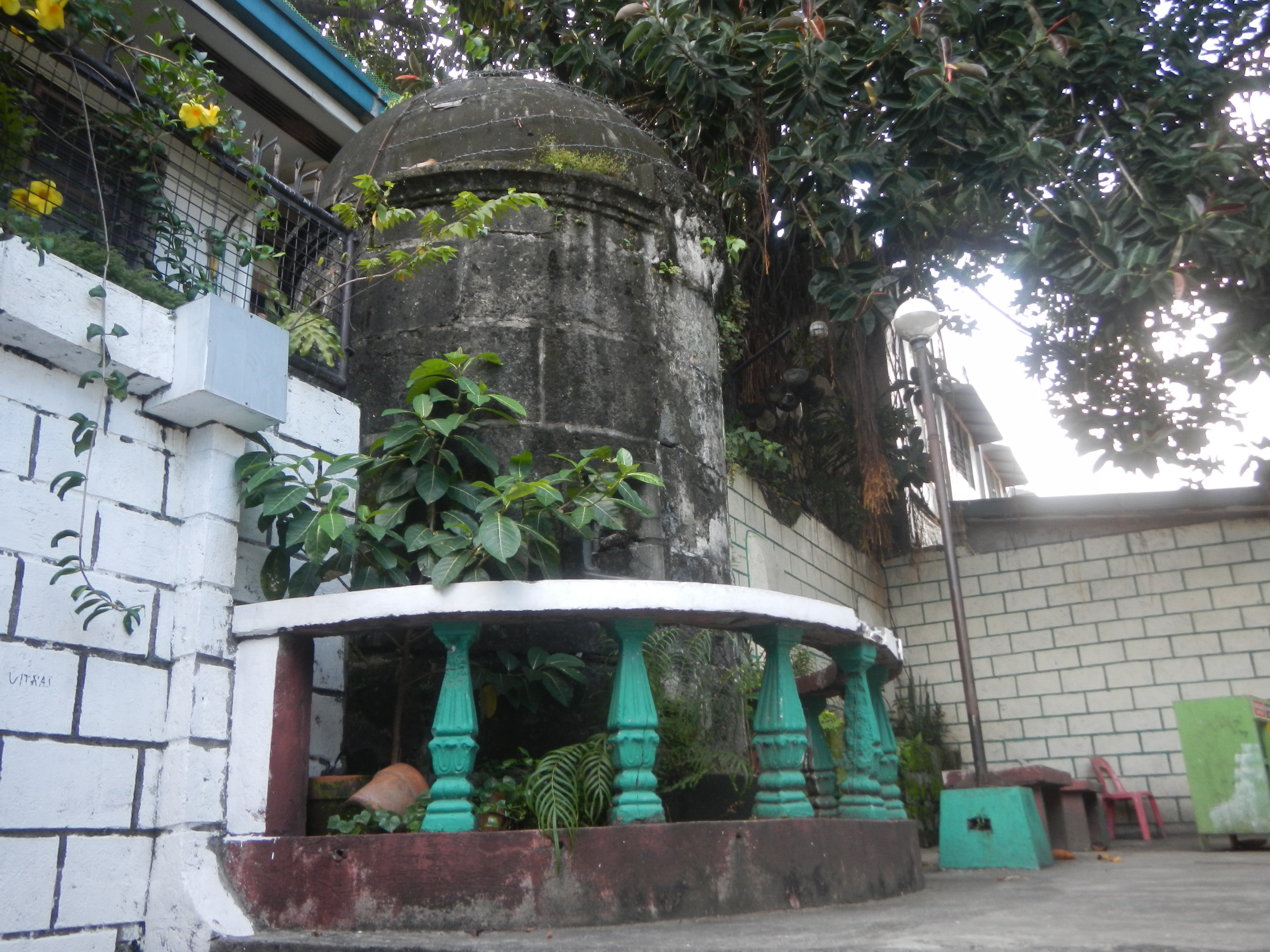
A silo of the former Almacén de Pólvora (El Polvorín) inside the San Juan Elementary School grounds.

When the Philippine Revolution against Spain broke out in August 1896, the Katipunan revolutionaries led by Andrés Bonifacio and his aide Emilio Jacinto made their way from Pugad Lawin in Caloocan (now part of Quezon City) to attack the El Polvorín and its military garrison in San Juan del Monte on the morning of August 30, 1896. Defended by a hundred Spanish troops consisting of infantry and artillery, the Katipuneros were able to eliminate the garrison commander and an artilleryman, forcing the remaining Spanish troops to retreat to the nearby El Deposito water reservoir near the San Juan Bautista Church. Sustaining heavy losses, the Katipuneros were unable to capture El Polvorín, and retreated south towards Mandaluyong, where Bonifacio reorganized the surviving Katipuneros and issued a war manifesto, leading Katipuneros in other places to organize Filipinos to rise up in arms against the colonial government as revolts spread all across the archipelago.

=== American invasion and Philippine Commonwealth ===
Following the end of the Philippine Revolution and the Treaty of Paris in 1898 that seceded the Philippines to the United States, the First Philippine Republic that succeeded the Katipunan distrusted the occupying American forces that were arriving in droves, with both sides wanting to engage in combat. On the morning of February 4, 1899, filipino troops from the 4th Company of the Morong Battalion under Captain Serapio Narvaez were fired upon by American troops of the 1st Nebraska Infantry Regiment from their defense line on the Santa Mesa side (now part of Sampaloc).

The first shot was exchanged by Private William W. Grayson, an American sentry from the 1st Nebraska Infantry Regiment of the United States Volunteer Army, who killed Filipino corporal Anastacio Felix and another Filipino soldier of the Philippine Revolutionary Army, firing the first shot of the Philippine–American War. This prompted lines of Filipino troops in San Juan del Monte to open fire at the line of American troops in Santa Mesa.

On the evening of February 4, 1899, Private William W. Grayson fired the first shot of the Philippine-American War at the corner of Sociego Street and Tomas Arguelles Street. A study done by Ronnie Miravite Casalmir places the event at this corner, not at Sociego-Silencio where they erroneously have the marker.

Throughout the war, various regiments of the United States Volunteer Army carried out multiple skirmishes against militias and soldiers of the First Philippine Republic in towns along the Camino de Mariquina, where they had cleared out Filipino forces at the El Deposito reservoir, its pumping station road (now Pinaglabanan Street, part of Santolan Road), and the santuario.

Both the revolution and the war caused many of the original residents of San Juan del Monte to evacuate en masse, permanently settling in neighboring towns. This led to many lots becoming abandoned. From 1898 to 1899, some residents returned to the town, resettling in shacks. However, due to unsanitary conditions, a malaria epidemic broke out in the area, with many casualties.

Following the end of the Philippine-American War, the municipality was repopulated by families coming from Mariquina and San Mateo. The Dominicans had also returned to the municipality to establish their ownership of the Santo Cristo hacienda before the new American colonial government. As a result, much of San Juan del Monte was being leased to the municipal government by Dominican hacienda owners until these lands were eventually purchased by the municipal government.

In 1901, the municipality was incorporated into the new province of Rizal through Act No. 137, with former Katipunan San Juan chapter sanggunian Andres Soriano serving as its first municipal president. In 1903, it was merged into the municipality of San Felipe Neri (present-day Mandaluyong) through Act No. 942 of the Taft Commission. San Felipe Neri later became the capital of Rizal for several months in 1904. In 1907, San Juan del Monte was reconstituted as an independent municipality through Act No. 1625.

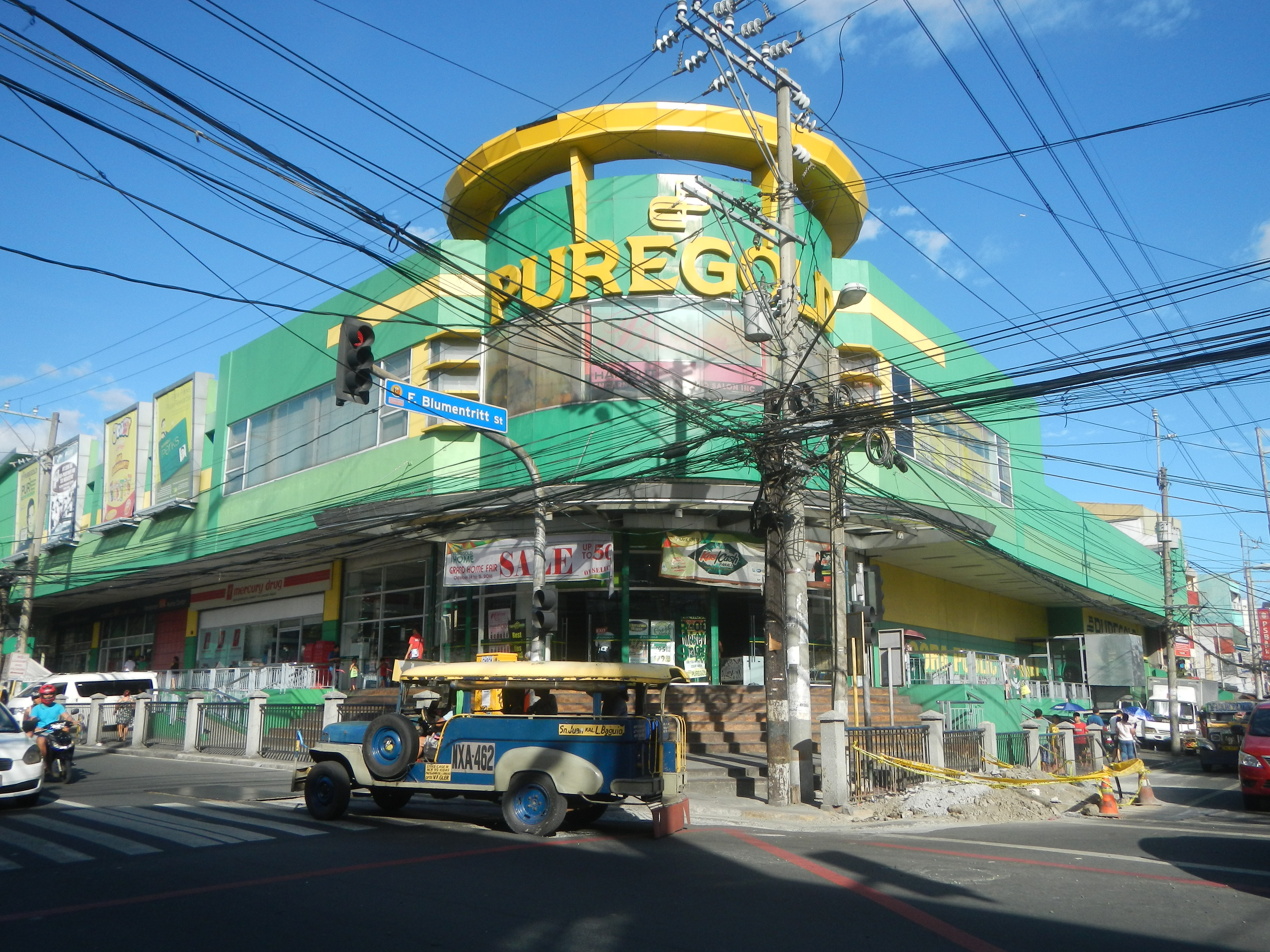
Puregold's Agora Market branch at the intersection of N. Domingo Street and F. Blumentritt Street. The Agora Market is located underneath the supermarket.

In 1916, the municipal government purchased the land along the intersection of N. Domingo and F. Blumentritt Streets, where the town market (present-day Agora Market) was located. Likewise, in 1919, businessmen Eusebio Orense and Florencio G. Diaz purchased a great bulk of the remaining hacienda lands, selling it to a Filipino-American consortium developing the San Juan Heights, a series of new subdivision developments all across the area. It was around this time that the municipality's name was contracted to San Juan.

A report made by the Rizal provincial government in 1933 noted that San Juan increased in population due to the development of residential subdivisions, such as San Juan Heights, Manila Heights, San Francisco del Monte Heights, Addition Hills, New Manila, and Rosario Heights. At the time, the municipality consisted of the nine barrios of Poblacion, Andres Bonifacio, Ermitaño, N. Domingo, Rincon, San Francisco del Monte, Sapang Camias, Sulapan, and Tibagan.

Between 1939 and 1941, the barrios of Cubao, Diliman, and San Francisco del Monte, as well as Camp Crame, were ceded from San Juan to the newly established Quezon City.

=== Japanese occupation era ===
On January 1, 1942, San Juan was one of the municipalities of Rizal merged alongside Manila and Quezon City to form the City of Greater Manila as an emergency measure by President Manuel L. Quezon. It became a municipality of Rizal once again when the City of Greater Manila was dissolved by President Sergio Osmeña effective August 1, 1945.

=== Philippine independence ===
==== Martial law era ====
San Juan, especially its exclusive subdivisions in Greenhills, was home to many prominent personalities during the country's Martial Law era under President Ferdinand Marcos. This included several Armed Forces of the Philippines generals, including Romeo Espino, Alfredo Montoya, and Romeo Gatan, who would later be tagged as members of the "Rolex 12"; Imelda Marcos’ secretary Fe Jimenez Roa; Presidential Assistant on Legal Affairs Ronaldo Zamora, who would later become a congressman for the lone congressional district of San Juan; San Juan Mayor Joseph Estrada, who would later become President of the Philippines; and prominent journalist Maximo Soliven, who was imprisoned when President Marcos first declared martial law in September 1972.

==== Incorporation into Metro Manila ====
When Presidential Decree No. 824 establishing the National Capital Region was signed on November 7, 1975, San Juan was among the towns excised from Rizal Province into the newly created metropolitan area.

==== People Power Revolution ====
Club Filipino, which had relocated to San Juan in 1970 from its original location in Santa Mesa, became an important part of the establishment of the Fifth Philippine Republic when Corazon Aquino was inaugurated there on February 25, 1986, the last day of the civilian-led 1986 People Power Revolution.

After the revolution, Mayor Estrada and other local officials nationwide were removed from office and replaced by officers in charge. Estrada himself had been seen as too close to the ousted Marcos administration, but his removal was delayed due to his refusal to leave, as well as the demonstrations by San Juan residents around city hall in March and April 1986. Although he later expressed willingness to step down, Estrada, actor Fernando Poe Jr. and police general Alfredo Lim were unsuccessful in convincing the demonstrators to disassemble. Lim moved with his armed officers to forcibly disperse the crowd, resulting in gunfire and the death of one Estrada supporter. Estrada was replaced by Reynaldo San Pascual

=== Contemporary ===
In 1992, San Juan had the fewest informal settler families out of all the municipalities and cities in Metro Manila based on data from the National Housing Authority.

==== Cityhood ====
Residents ratified the conversion of the municipality into a highly urbanized city on June 17, 2007, pursuant to Republic Act No. 9388 ("An Act Converting the Municipality of San Juan into a Highly Urbanized City to be known as the City of San Juan"). Then-Representative Ronaldo Zamora sponsored the Cityhood Bill in the House of Representatives and worked for its approval.

==== Presidential ties ====
Although not officially designated as such, San Juan is noted to be the "City of Philippine Presidents." Five presidents were official residents of San Juan. They were the Macapagal père et fille, Diosdado (1961–1965) and Gloria Macapagal Arroyo (2001–2010); Marcos père et fils, Ferdinand (1965–1986) and Bongbong (2022–present); and Joseph Estrada (1998–2001), who also served as Mayor when San Juan was still a municipality.

== Geography ==
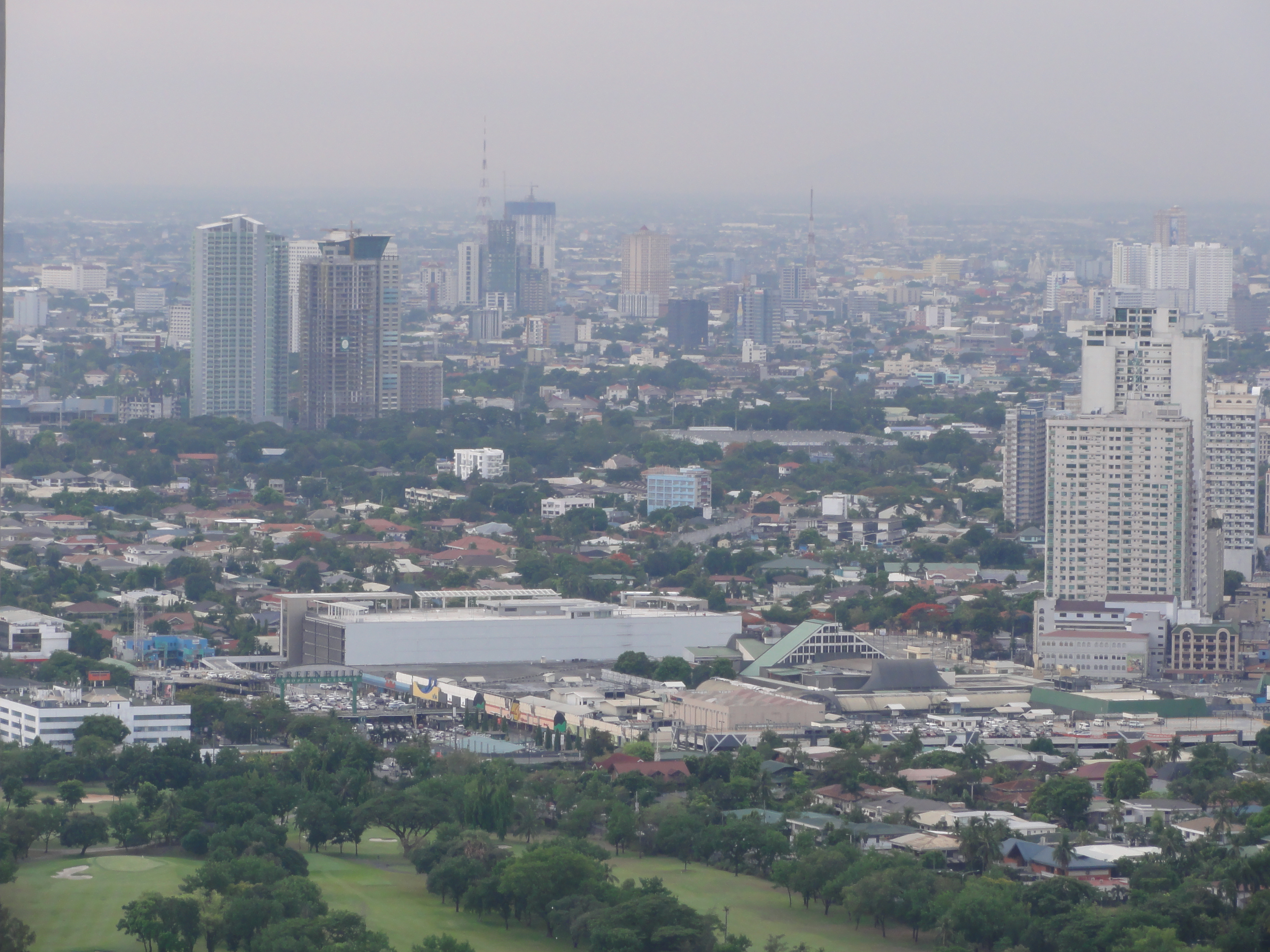
Aerial view of San Juan's Greenhills area (2015)

San Juan is the least-extensive city in the Philippines with a total area of just 595 hectares (2.30 sq mi).

San Juan is bounded by Quezon City on the north and east, Mandaluyong on the south, and the City of Manila in the west.

The territory of San Juan was much larger than it is now, having been adjacent to Caloocan and Marikina prior to the creation of Quezon City. Parts of the present-day Districts 1, 3, and 4 of Quezon City, as well as areas of Mandaluyong, were originally within the town's colonial-era borders. This also explains why San Juan Reservoir is in nearby Horseshoe Village, a subdivision now part of Quezon City.

=== Climate ===
Climate data for San Juan
Month	Jan	Feb	Mar	Apr	May	Jun	Jul	Aug	Sep	Oct	Nov	Dec	Year
Mean daily maximum °C (°F)	29 (84)	30 (86)	32 (90)	34 (93)	33 (91)	31 (88)	30 (86)	29 (84)	29 (84)	30 (86)	30 (86)	29 (84)	31 (87)
Mean daily minimum °C (°F)	20 (68)	20 (68)	21 (70)	23 (73)	24 (75)	25 (77)	24 (75)	25 (77)	24 (75)	23 (73)	22 (72)	21 (70)	23 (73)
Average precipitation mm (inches)	7 (0.3)	7 (0.3)	9 (0.4)	21 (0.8)	101 (4.0)	152 (6.0)	188 (7.4)	170 (6.7)	159 (6.3)	115 (4.5)	47 (1.9)	29 (1.1)	1,005 (39.7)
Average rainy days	3.3	3.5	11.1	8.1	18.9	23.5	26.4	25.5	24.5	19.6	10.4	6.4	181.2
Source: Meteoblue

=== Barangays ===
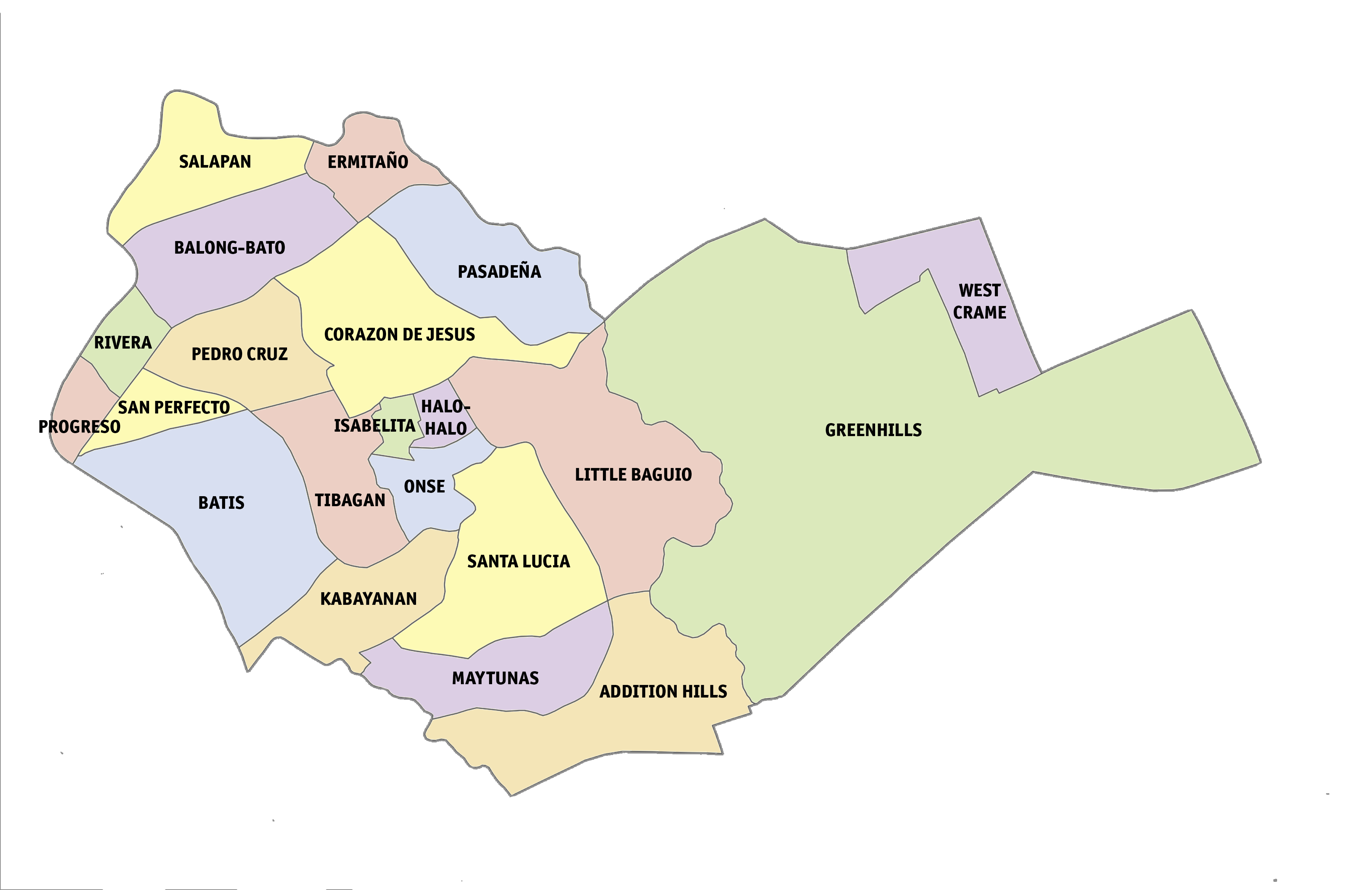
Political map of San Juan

San Juan is politically subdivided and comprises into 21 barangays organized into two city council districts:

PSGC	Barangay	Population			±% p.a.		Area		PD 2024		District	Date of Fiesta
		2024		2010			ha	acre	/km^{2}	/sq mi		
137405001	Addition Hills	2.8%	3,818	3,364	▴	0.87%	3,582	8,851	110	280	2	June 24
137405002	Balong–Bato	5.4%	7,203	7,141	▴	0.06%	2,451	6,057	290	760	1	Tuesday before Ash Wednesday
137405003	Batis	7.0%	9,453	9,292	▴	0.12%	3,510	8,674	270	700	1	June 24
137405004	Corazón de Jesús (Poblacion)	5.9%	7,875	10,475	▾	−1.94%	3,302	8,160	240	620	1	June 8
137405005	Ermitaño	4.7%	6,361	2,846	▴	5.69%	1,379	3,408	460	1,200	1	June 24
137405021	Greenhills	11.3%	15,213	12,548	▴	1.33%	20,786	51,364	73	190	2	June 24
137405006	Isabelita	1.2%	1,556	1,620	▾	−0.28%	344	850	450	1,200	2	September 14
137405007	Kabayanan	4.2%	5,601	5,584	▴	0.02%	1,798	4,443	310	810	2	May 3
137405008	Little Baguio	4.7%	6,275	6,110	▴	0.18%	4,371	10,801	140	370	2	May 1, Second Sunday of May
137405009	Maytunas	2.1%	2,775	2,699	▴	0.19%	2,078	5,135	130	350	2	Last Sunday of January
137405010	Onse	2.8%	3,736	4,262	▾	−0.90%	967	2,390	390	1,000	2	November 30
137405011	Pasadeña	3.3%	4,417	3,919	▴	0.83%	2,425	5,992	180	470	1	May 14–15
137405012	Pedro Cruz	3.1%	4,135	4,012	▴	0.21%	1,843	4,554	220	580	1	December 12
137405013	Progreso	1.2%	1,669	1,679	▾	−0.04%	410	1,013	410	1,100	1	July 25
137405014	Rivera	1.8%	2,381	2,866	▾	−1.27%	606	1,497	390	1,000	1	Third Sunday of October
137405015	Saint Joseph (Halo-Halo)	1.6%	2,135	4,489	▾	−4.98%	381	941	560	1,500	2	March 19
137405016	Salapán	6.6%	8,865	8,773	▴	0.07%	1,773	4,381	500	1,300	1	August 15
137405017	San Perfecto	3.4%	4,618	4,131	▴	0.77%	803	1,984	580	1,500	1	January 18
137405018	Santa Lucia	6.0%	8,092	6,370	▴	1.66%	3,106	7,675	260	670	2	Second Sunday of December
137405019	Tibagan	2.8%	3,817	3,826	▾	−0.02%	1,739	4,297	220	570	2	June 24
137405020	West Crame	12.2%	16,353	15,424	▴	0.40%	1,769	4,371	920	2,400	2	December 8
	Total		134,312	68,578	▴	4.73%	595	1,470	23,000	14		

== Demographics ==
Population census of San Juan
Year	Pop.	±% p.a.
1903	1,455	—
1918	6,172	+10.11%
1939	18,870	+5.47%
1948	31,493	+5.86%
1960	56,861	+5.05%
1970	104,559	+6.27%
1975	122,492	+3.23%
1980	130,088	+1.21%
1990	126,854	−0.25%
1995	124,187	−0.40%
2000	117,680	−1.15%
2007	125,338	+0.87%
2010	121,430	−1.15%
2015	122,180	+0.12%
2020	126,347	+0.71%
2024	134,312	+1.48%
Source: Philippine Statistics Authority

As of the 2024 census, San Juan has a population of 134,312, with a density of 22,900 inhabitants per square kilometre or 59,300 inhabitants per square mile.

=== Demonym ===
Residents of San Juan are called "San Juaneño" or "San Juaneña"

=== Language ===
Filipino and English are the Philippine official languages. Filipino, a standardized version of Tagalog, is spoken primarily in Metro Manila.

=== Religion ===
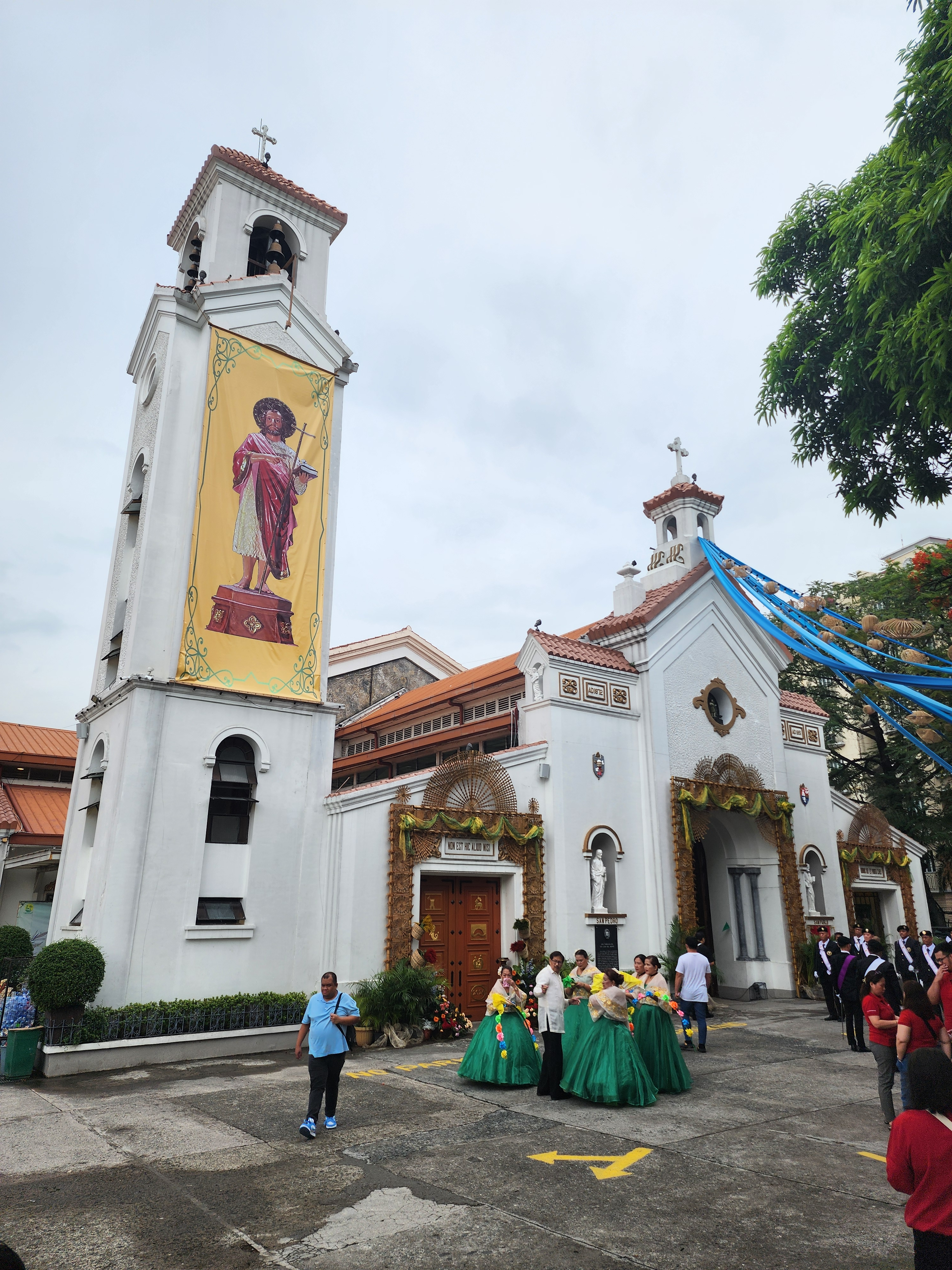
Archdiocesan Shrine of Saint John the Baptist

The city also has several notable places of worship. Archdiocesan Shrine of Saint John the Baptist, more commonly known as "Pinaglabanan Church", is where the city's patron saint, John the Baptist, is enshrined. The Santuario del Santo Cristo is the settlement's oldest existing church, while Mary the Queen Parish in West Greenhills serves the local Filipino-Chinese community.

From 1925 to 1971, the Iglesia ni Cristo once headquartered in the town at its former Central Office Complex, now known as the Locale of F. Manalo. It features Art-Deco designed ensembles, crafted by National Artist for Architecture Juan Nakpil. The chapel is the centerpiece of the Complex, which also contains the old Central Office and Pastoral House that was the home of the church's first Executive Minister, Felix Manalo, along with other Ministers and Evangelical Workers. When Manalo died in 1963, a mausoleum was constructed on the grounds of the Complex by architect Carlos Santos-Viola. INC adherents in San Juan comprise 4.2% of the city population.

San Juan also has a number of Evangelical churches. Through the APOI (Association of Pastors for Outreach and Intercession), they have contributed to the spiritual atmosphere of the city. Every January, the city celebrates the National Bible Week, where the reading of the Scripture happens during the flag raising ceremony in the City Hall. Through the blessing of the mayor, a bible was planted in the heart of the new city hall during its construction. Major evangelical churches like Jesus is Lord and Victory Greenhills, and Baptist churches like San Juan Baptist Church, are also found in the city of San Juan.

San Juan is also home to two Islamic mosques, namely: Masjid Hamza Bin Ahmed in Balong-Bato and Greenhills Masjid at Greenhills.

On the 2024 feast of St. John the Baptist, the local government declared him as patron saint of San Juan City.

== Economy ==
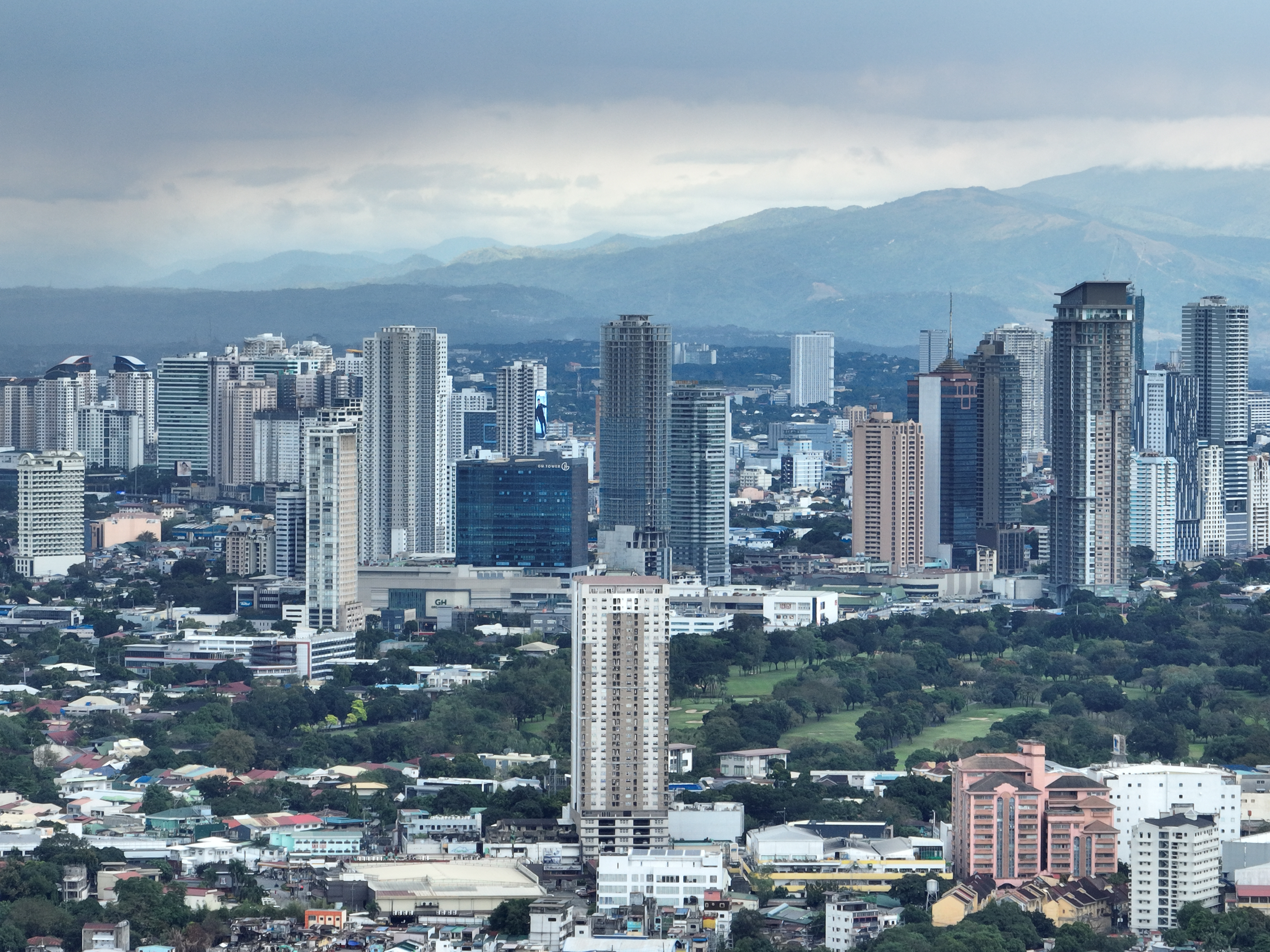
A drone shot of the Barangay Greenhills area and the Wack Wack Golf and Country Club, with buildings of the Araneta City seen at the background (2026)

Primex Tower, the tallest building in San Juan.

San Juan has the third-highest per capita GDP of the country at ₱713,042 (US$13,260).

San Juan is predominantly residential, mixed with commercial and manufacturing businesses.

The Greenhills shopping district is the hub of trade and commerce in San Juan. The shopping complex housed shopping malls, the Virra Mall, Shoppesville, Greenhills Theatre Mall, Promenade Mall, the former Greenhills Bowling Alley, and Unimart.

As of 2022, San Juan had the labor force participation rate of 67%, the most in the Philippines.

Poverty incidence of San Juan (%)

Source: Philippine Statistics Authority

== Culture ==
=== Wattah Wattah Festival ===
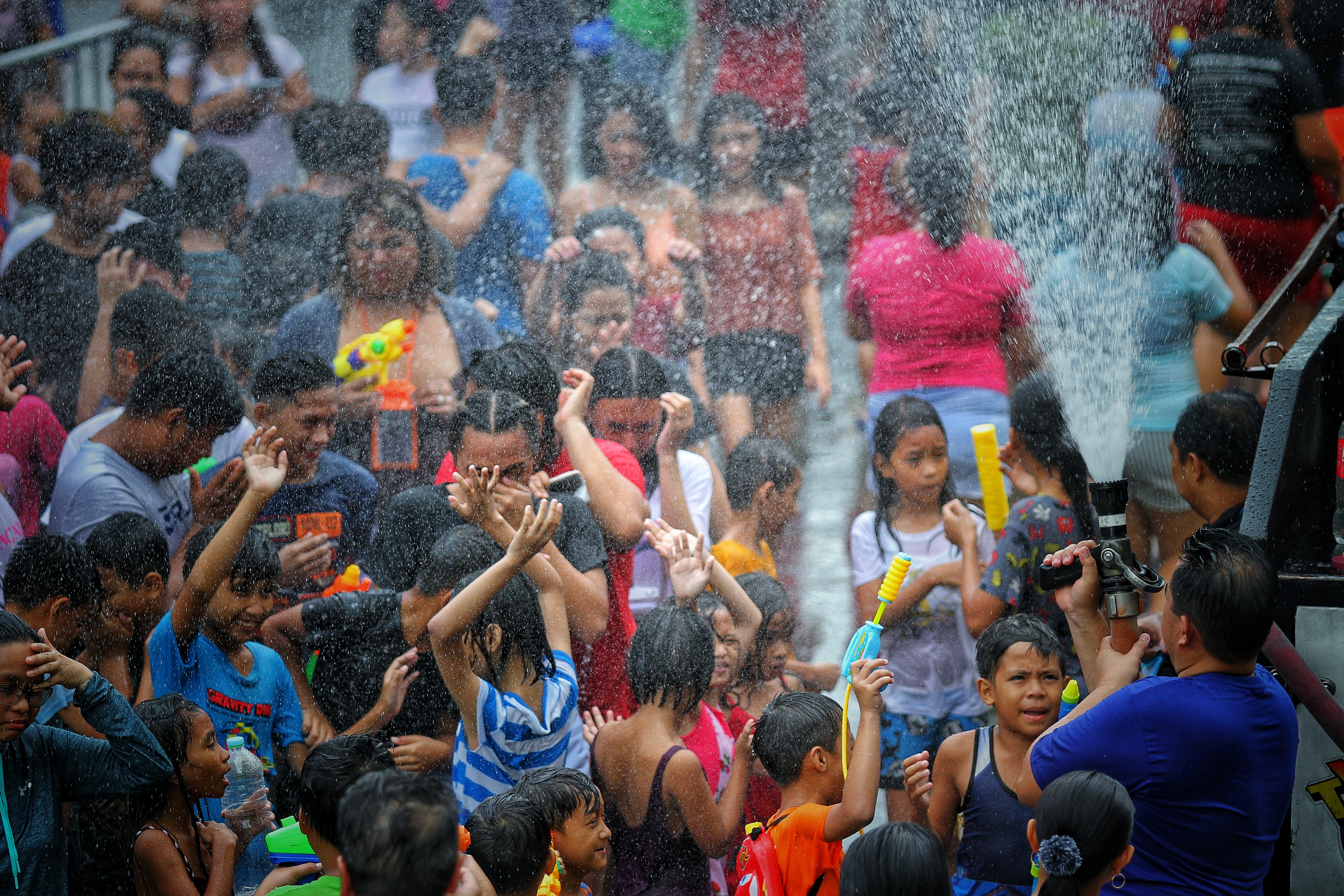
Wattah Wattah Festival in 2019

Since 2003, San Juan celebrates the feast of its patron saint, St. John the Baptist every June 24 with its Wattah Wattah Festival, a festival with dancing, parades, and its traditional basaan or water dousing along the city streets. The festival and its activities are usually held along N. Domingo Street and Pinaglabanan Street as the procession of the image of St. John the Baptist goes down the streets.

San Juan City Ordinance No. 51 series of 2018 prohibits dirty water, ice, water in glass bottles, and water or ice in other materials that will incite pain or injury upon impact from being used in the festival. Physical violence, inciting of threats, and deliberately entering public transport vehicles to douse commuters is also not allowed.

However, in 2020 and 2021, due to the COVID-19 pandemic, the festival was reduced to a parade of the image of St. John the Baptist with social distancing and mask mandates in place. In 2022, due to a lower number of COVID-19 cases, the traditional basaan was included again in the Wattah! Wattah! Festival, accompanied by a street dancing competition, a free concert, and a fireworks display.

Starting in 2025, as prescribed by City Ordinance No. 14, Series of 2025, designated water dousing zone will only be at Pinaglabanan Shrine and Pinaglabanan Street from corner N. Domingo Street to corner P. Guevarra Street and its ending time was changed from 1:00 pm to 2:00 pm.

=== Sports ===
San Juan has a long history with sports, the Filoil EcoOil Centre has hosted numerous sporting events, including the Philippine Basketball Association, Maharlika Pilipinas Basketball League, Premier Volleyball League, and the Filoil EcoOil Preseason Cup.

The city is also home to the San Juan Knights, which started in the now-defunct Metropolitan Basketball Association and now competes in the Maharlika Pilipinas Basketball League. The Knights have won three league championships in its entire franchise history.

== Transportation ==
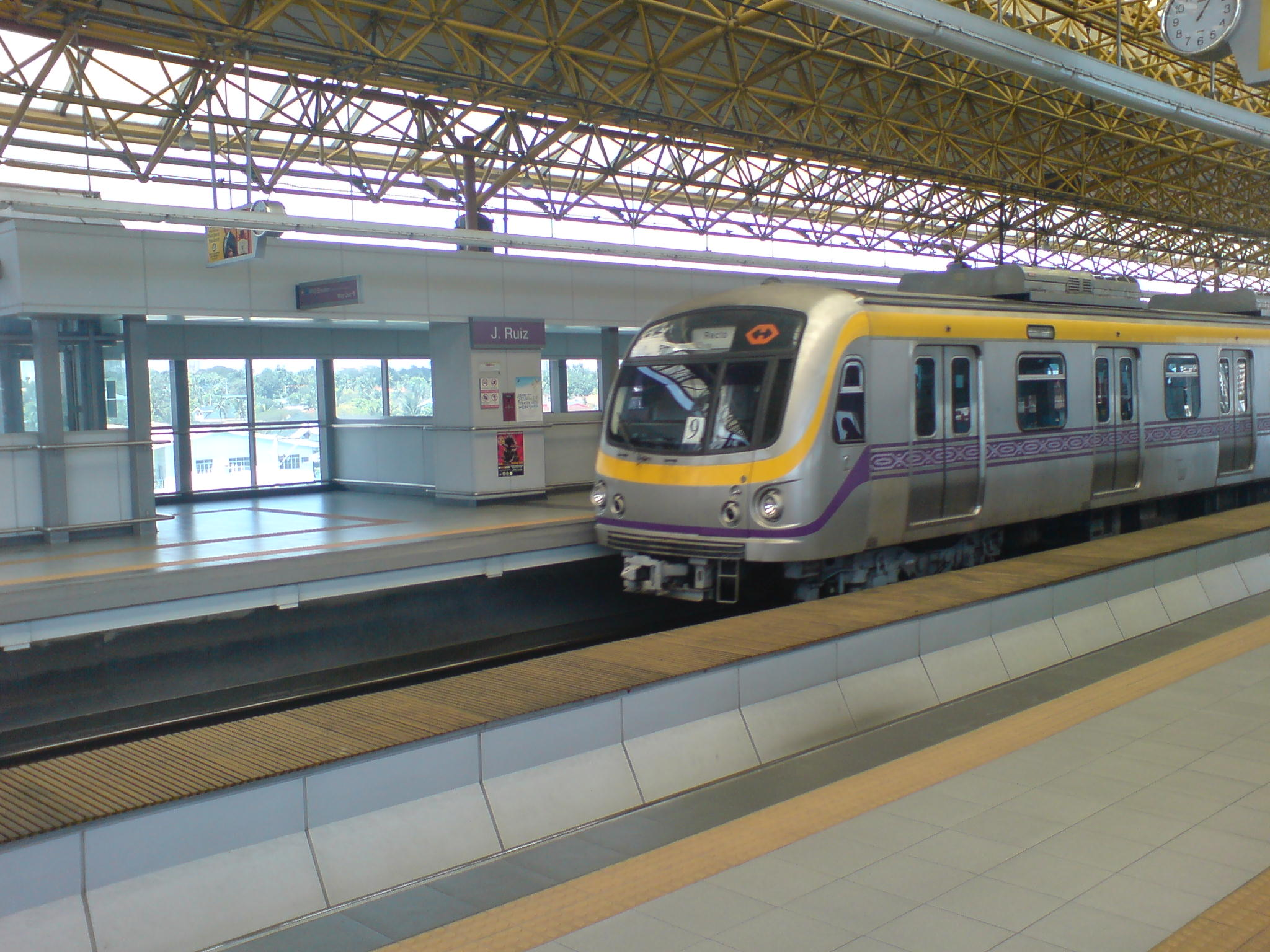
The J. Ruiz station is the only rail and rapid transit station serving San Juan.

Modes of public transportation in San Juan include jeepneys and buses. Jeepney routes ply the Aurora Boulevard (R-6). The city is serviced by J. Ruiz station of the LRT Line 2 in the city proper and indirectly served by Santolan-Annapolis station of the MRT Line 3, at the city's eastern boundary with Quezon City. The C-3 (Araneta Avenue) also passes through San Juan. Secondary routes include Nicolas Domingo (abbreviated N. Domingo), which heads towards Cubao in Quezon City, and Pinaglabanan Street (which continues as Santolan Road) leading towards Ortigas Avenue and eventually the southern reaches of Quezon City near Camp Crame, the headquarters of the Philippine National Police.

== Education ==
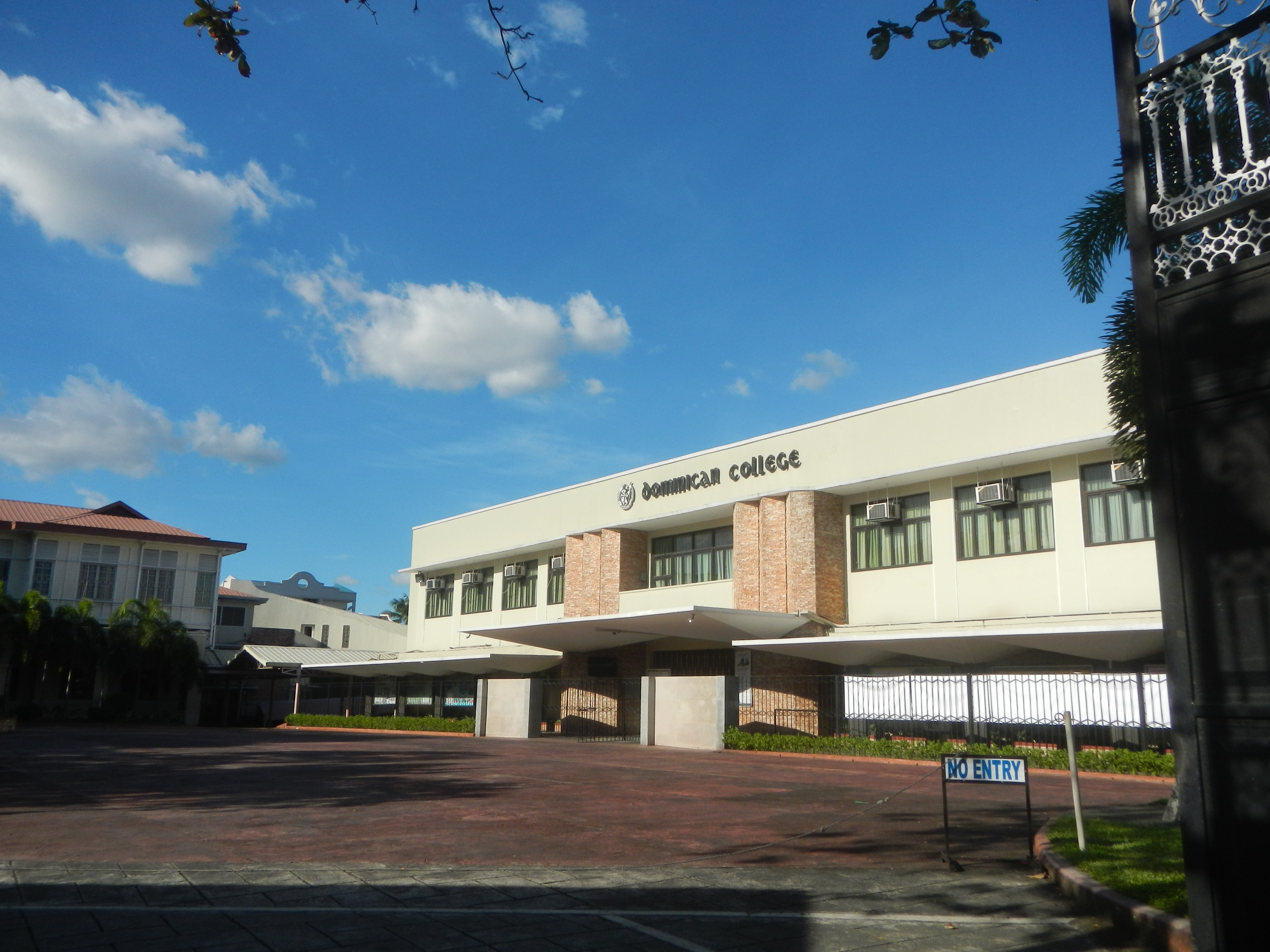
Dominican College, a private higher education institution in the city.

The Schools Divisions Office (SDO) of San Juan oversees 9 public elementary schools, 2 public high schools, and a science high school within the city. The SDO also recognizes 24 private schools in San Juan City, seven of which are preschools, four of which are elementary schools, and 13 of which are high schools.

Public higher education is offered by the state Polytechnic University of the Philippines, which maintains its San Juan campus in Barangay Addition Hills. Private higher education is offered by the Dominican College in Barangay Tibagan, one of the oldest schools in the city, having been established in 1924.

The city also has two culinary schools, namely the Center for Asian Culinary Studies in Barangay Pasadena and the Instituto Culinario in Barangay Greenhills.

== Notable personalities ==
- Alfred Vargas, actor and Quezon City 5th district councilor
- Bongbong Marcos, 17th President of the Philippines, former senator, former Ilocos Norte governor, and former representative of Ilocos Norte 2nd District
- Chris Tiu, TV host and former basketball player
- Don Allado, former basketball player, basketball coach, San Juan councilor
- Edu Manzano, former Makati vice mayor, actor and former US Military officer
- Eraño Manalo, Iglesia ni Cristo Executive Minister (1963–2009)
- Ferdinand Marcos, 10th President of the Philippines, 3rd Prime Minister of the Philippines, 11th President of the Senate of the Philippines, former representative of Ilocos Norte 2nd District
- Francis Zamora, former San Juan Vice Mayor and incumbent San Juan Mayor (since 2019)
- Franklin Drilon, senator
- Gabby Concepcion, actor, singer, businessman
- Gloria Macapagal Arroyo, 14th President of the Philippines, 10th Vice President of the Philippines, 25th Speaker of the House of Representatives of the Philippines (the first woman to hold the position), deputy speaker of the 17th Congress and a member of the House of Representatives representing the 2nd District of Pampanga.
- Grace Poe, senator and former MTRCB chairperson
- Imee Marcos, senator, former Ilocos Norte 2nd District representative
- Irene Marcos, daughter of Ferdinand Marcos and Imelda Marcos
- Imelda Marcos, former First Lady and former Governor of Metro Manila
- Jake Ejercito, actor
- James Yap, former basketball player, San Juan councilor
- Janella Salvador, actress, singer, artist
- Jaymee Joaquin, former TV host
- Jinggoy Estrada, senator, former San Juan Mayor, and actor
- Joross Gamboa, actor
- Joseph Estrada, 13th President of the Philippines, 9th Vice President of the Philippines, 26th Mayor of Manila, 14th San Juan Mayor, actor
- JV Ejercito, senator, former San Juan Mayor
- Ericka Villongco, singer and actress
- Krissy Villongco, singer
- Luis Manzano, actor and TV host
- Max Soliven, journalist, newspaper publisher, founder of The Philippine Star
- Ophelia Dimalanta, poet, editor, author, and teacher
- Paul Artadi, former basketball player and San Juan District 1 councilor
- Ping Remulla, Member of the Philippine House of Representatives from Cavite's 7th district
- Philip Cezar, PBA Player aka "Tapal King", San Juan vice mayor (1992–2001), and current basketball coach
- Ronaldo Zamora, former congressman of lone district of San Juan and San Juan–Mandaluyong
- Teofisto Guingona Jr., 11th Vice President of the Philippines
- Yasmien Kurdi, actress
- Diego Loyzaga, actor
- Bayani Fernando, ex politician
- E.R. Ejercito, actor
- Mikha Lim, member of Bini
- Reynolds Michael T. Tan, congressman
- Mark Caguioa, former basketball player; support financial from The Philippine Government
- Sandro Marcos, congressman; son of Bongbong Marcos Jr
- Cassandra Ong, fugitive businesswoman who was an associate of Lucky South 99 Outsourcing, Inc., a defunct Philippine offshore gaming operator (POGO) in Porac, Pampanga

== Sister cities ==
=== Local ===
- Davao City
- El Salvador, Misamis Oriental
- Iloilo City
- Dagupan City
- Dumaguete City
- Oroquieta City
- Ozamiz City
- Pagadian City
- Siquijor
- Tuguegarao City

=== International ===
- Coquitlam, British Columbia, Canada
- San Juan, Puerto Rico
- Maui, Hawaii, United States
- Santa Barbara, California, United States

== Gallery ==
The San Juan Government Center along Pinaglabanan Street corner Doctor P. A. Narciso Street in Barangay Corazon de Jesus

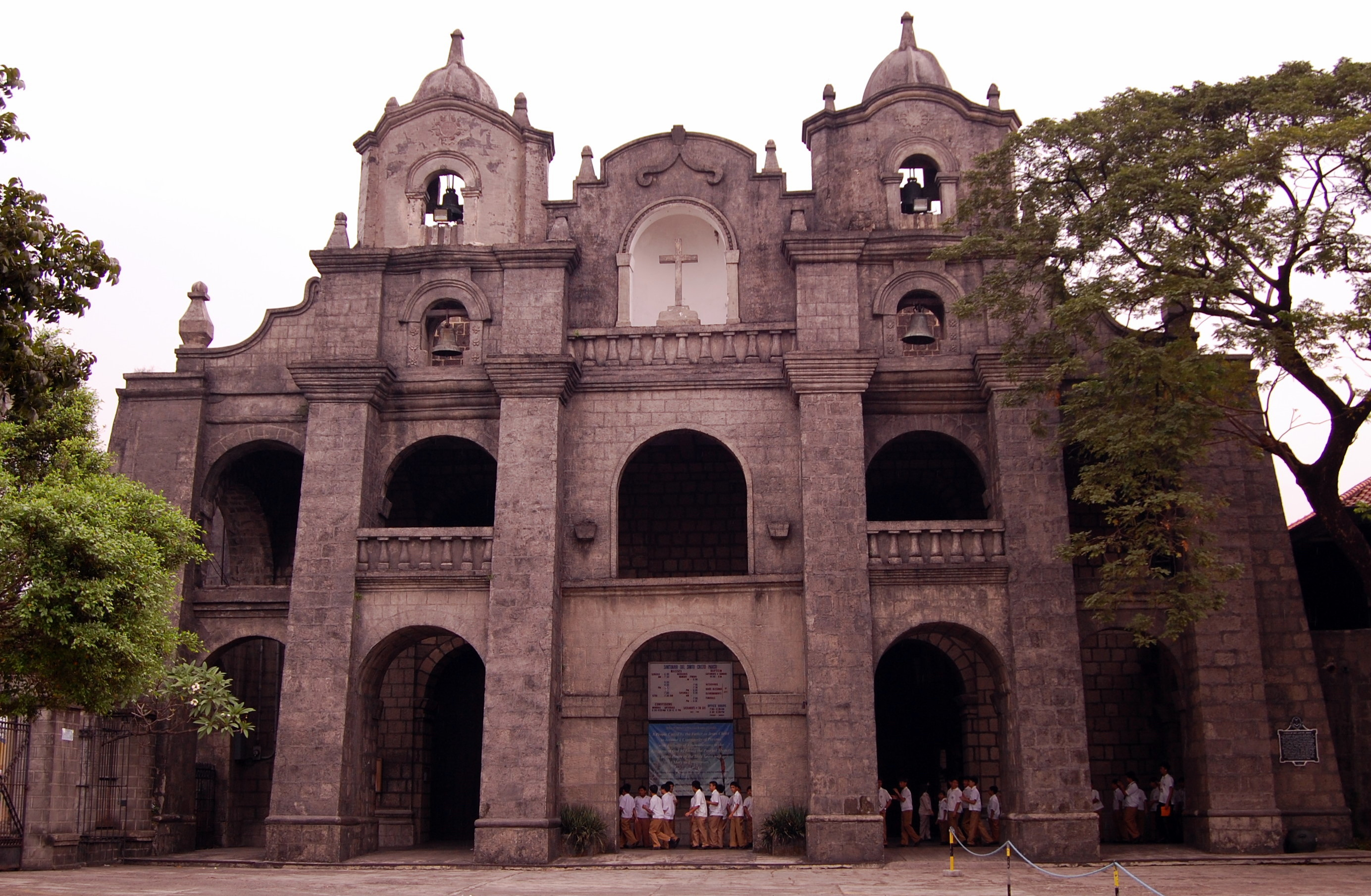
Santuario del Santo Cristo

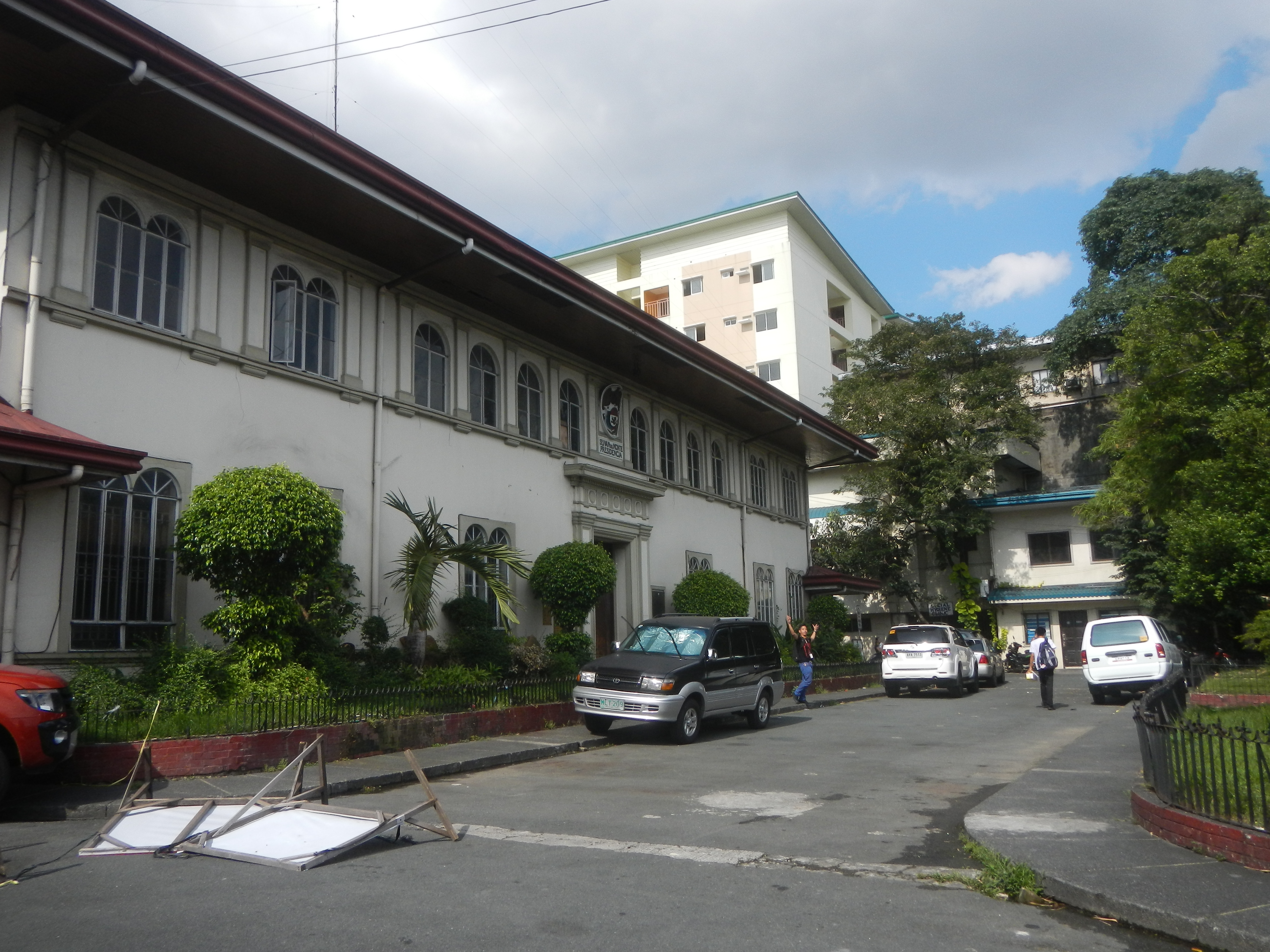
The old municipal hall of San Juan, with the San Juan Medical Center in the background. No longer existing. It was replaced with front extension of San Juan Medical Center.

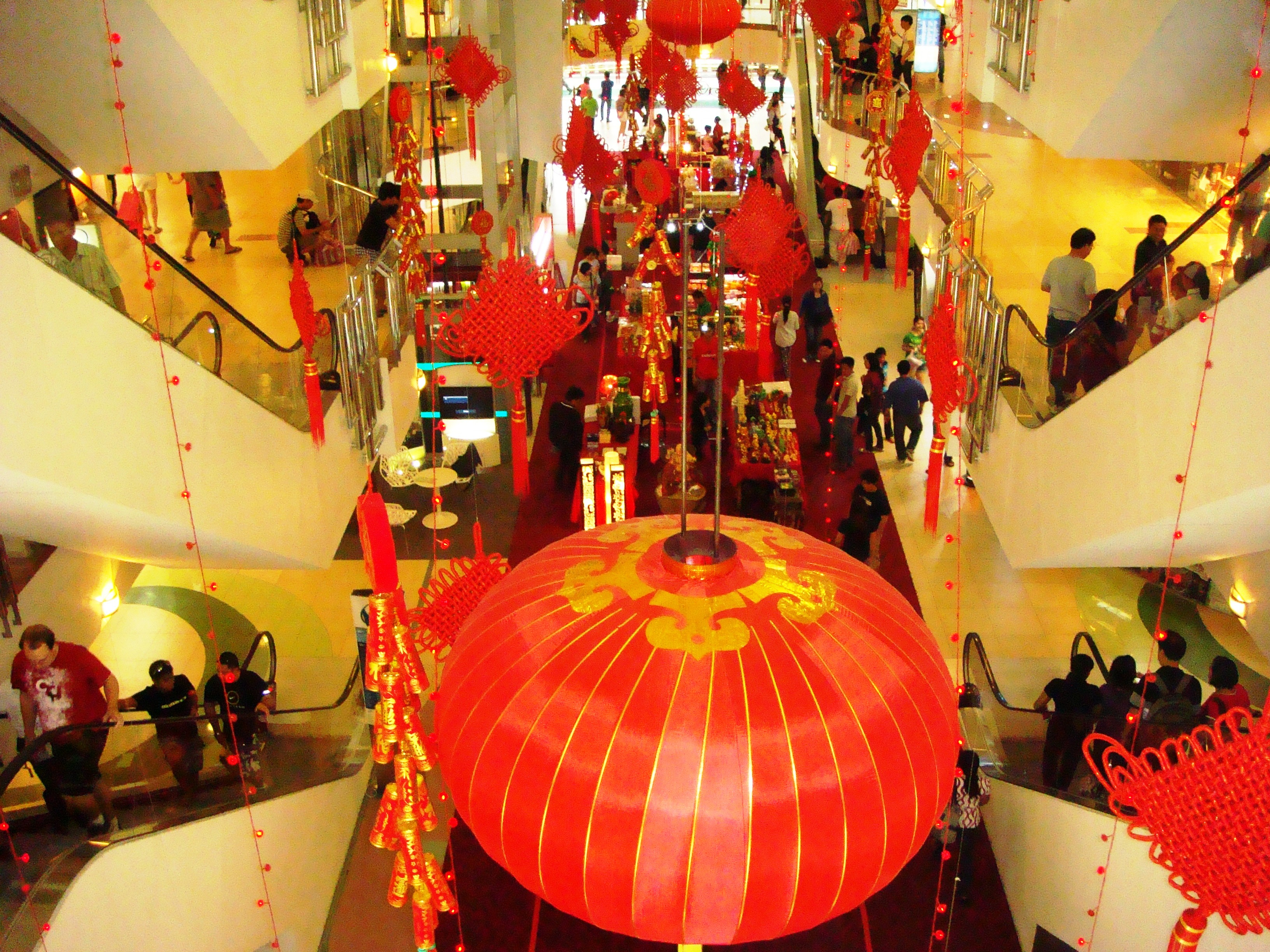
V Mall, one of many shopping areas in the Greenhills mixed-use development.

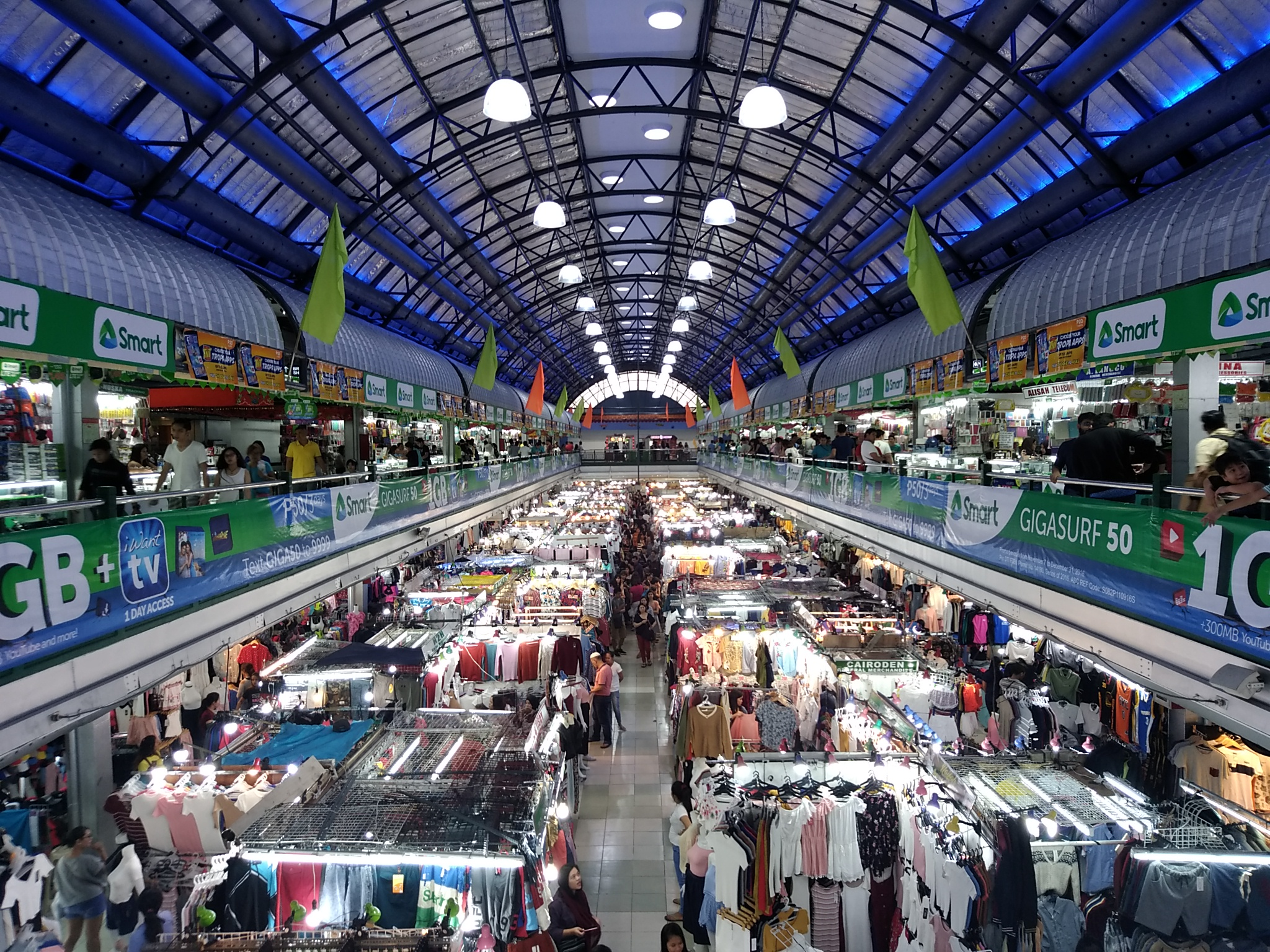
The tiangge area of the Greenhills Shopping Center in Barangay Greenhills.

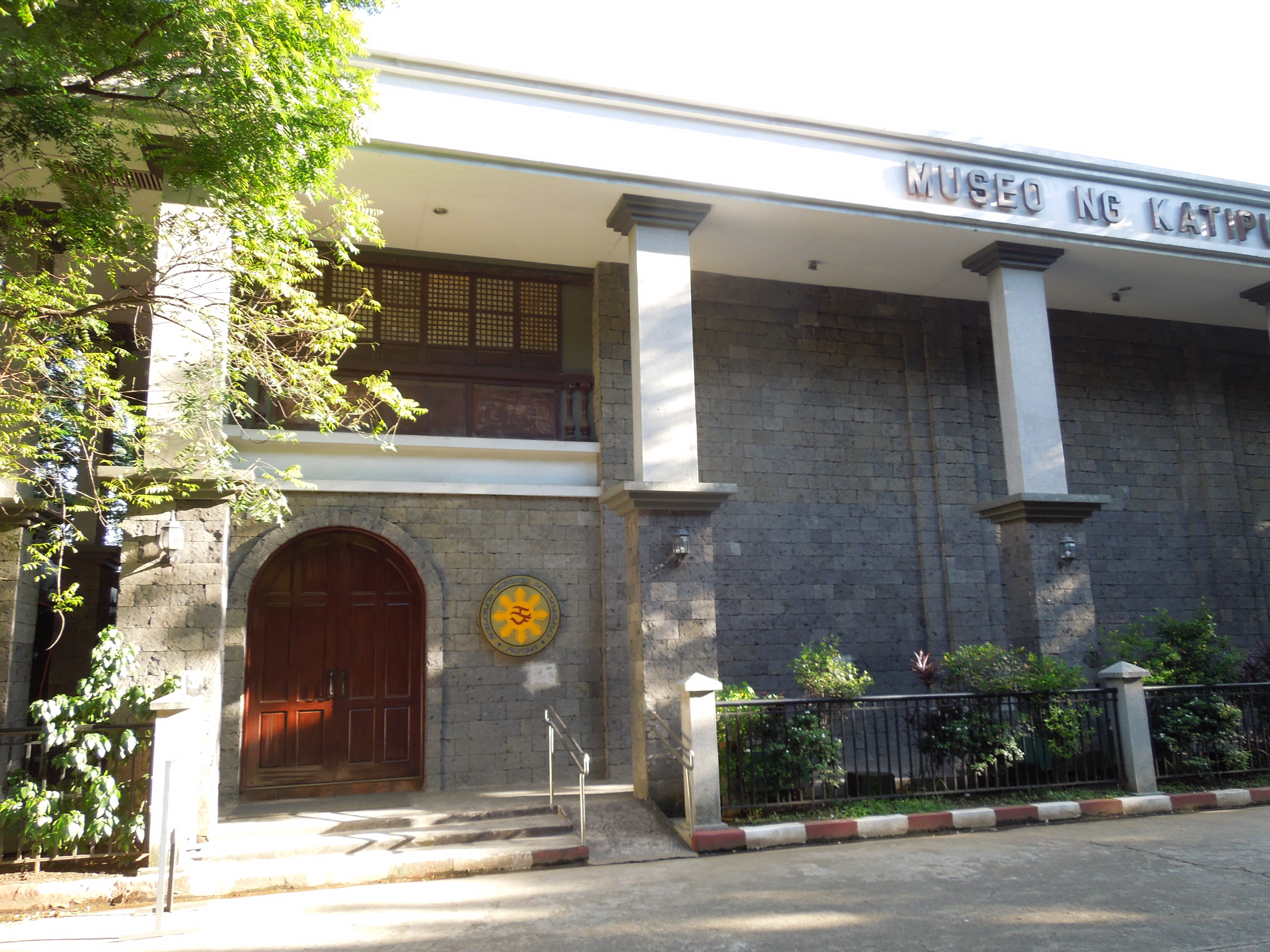
The Museo ng Katipunan located at Pinaglabanan Shrine.

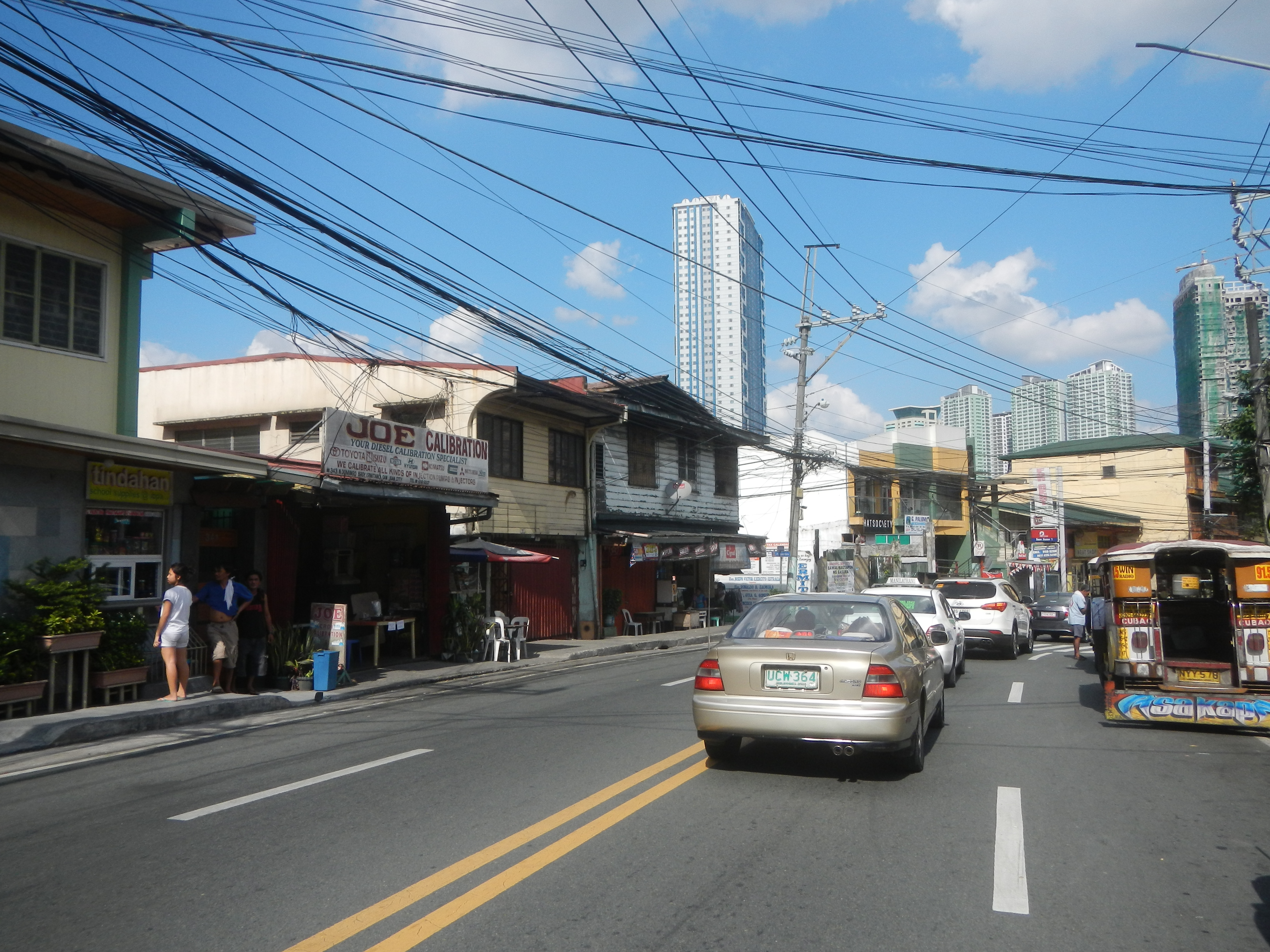
Commercial establishments along the city's main road, Nicolas Domingo Street.

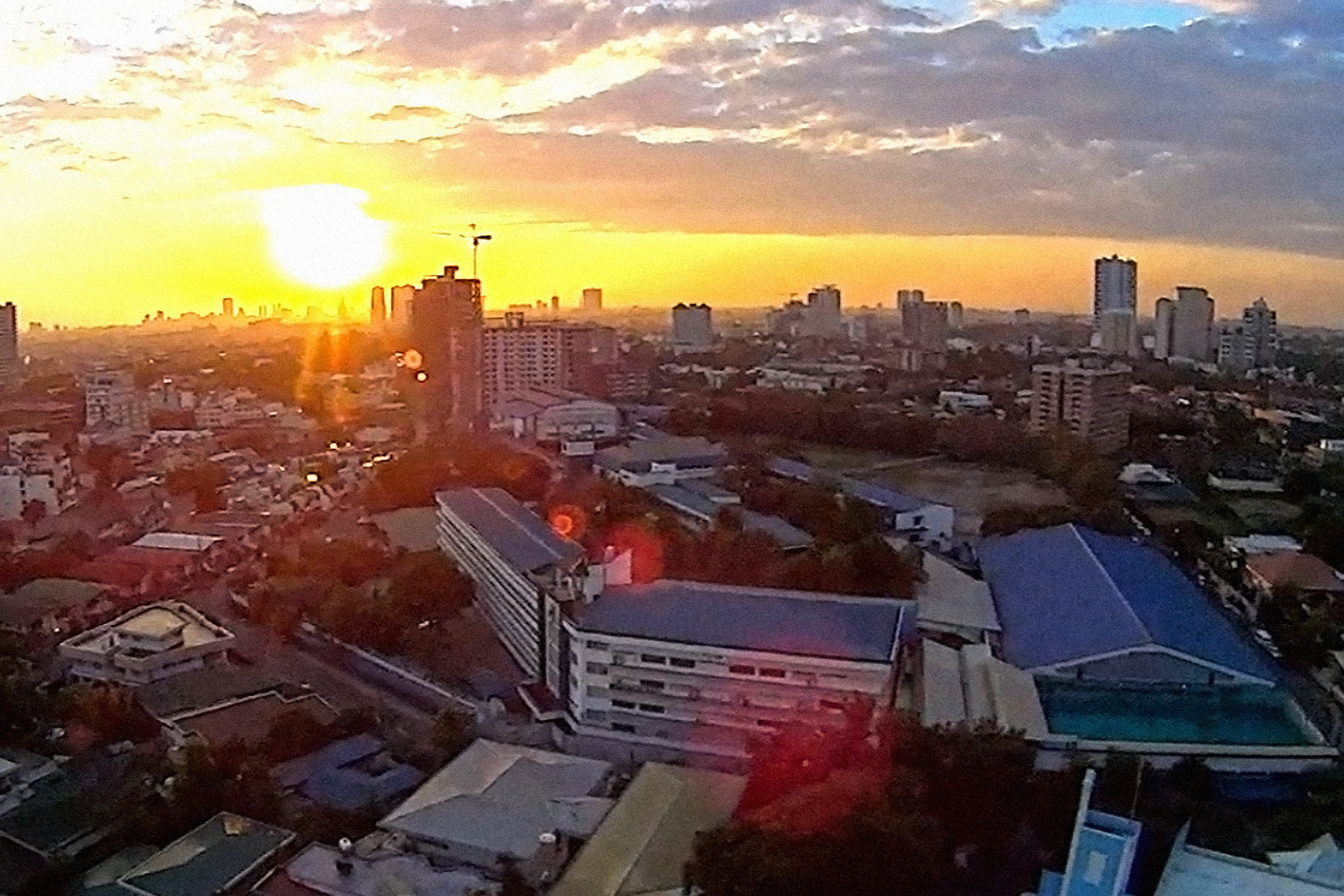
A panoramic view of San Juan from Xavier School Greenhills.

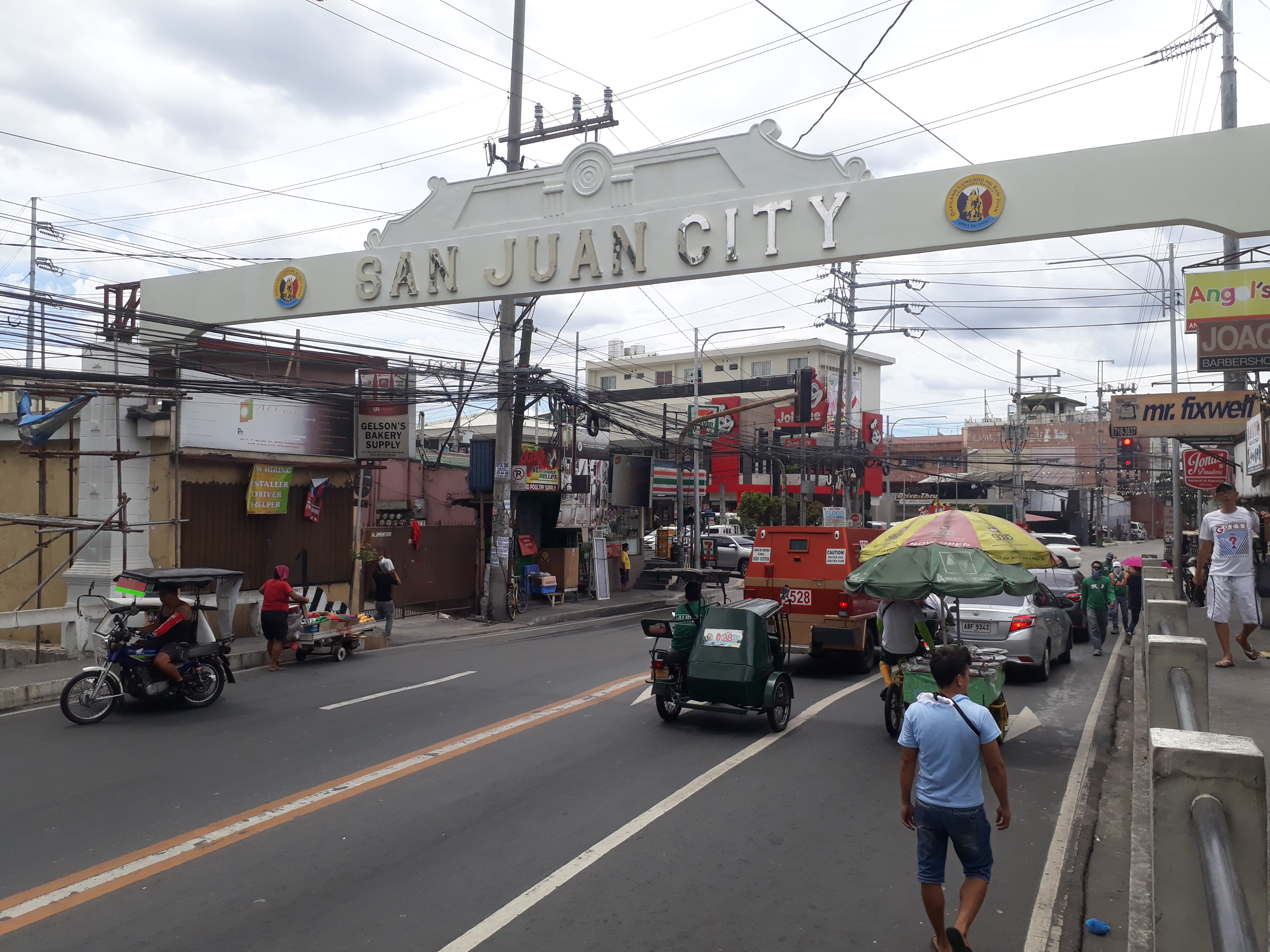
San Juan City Welcome Arch on General Kalentong Street, Mandaluyong City.
