= 16th PMPC Star Awards for Music =

2024 award ceremony for Filipino music

- Show title card
- Date: October 27, 2024
- Venue: Carlos P. Romulo Auditorium; RCBC Plaza, Makati, Philippines
- Hosted by: Atasha Muhlach; Jameson Blake; Andre Paras; Heaven Peralejo

Television/radio coverage
- Network: A2Z
- Produced by: ZOE Broadcasting Network Inc.; Airtime Marketing Philippines Inc.; Precision Digital Broadcast Solution Inc.

The 16th PMPC Star Awards for Music, also dubbed as 16th PMPC Star Awards for Music ...The Concert, honored the best Filipino music of 2023, as chosen by the members of the Philippine Movie Press Club (PMPC), on October 27, 2024. The ceremony took place at the Carlos P. Romulo Auditorium in RCBC Plaza, Makati, Philippines, and was hosted by Atasha Muhlach, Jameson Blake, Andre Paras, and Heaven Peralejo.

A delayed telecast was broadcast by A2Z on November 9, 2024.

== Winners and nominees ==
The following are the nominations for the 16th PMPC Star Awards for Music, covering music released in 2023.

Winners are listed first and highlighted in bold.

=== Major categories ===
Album of the Year	Song of the Year
**"Pagtatag!" – SB19 (Sony Music Philippines)**; "I Find Love So. So. Weird" – Cool Cat Ash (Star Music); "IsaPuso" – Alamat (Viva Records); "Sad Songs and Bullshits Part 1" – Juan Karlos (Island Records Philippines); "Songs From Home" – Ogie Alcasid (Star Music); "Zack: For All" – Zack Tabudlo (Republic Records Philippines)	**"Gento" – SB19 (Sony Music Philippines)**; "Ere" – Juan Karlos (Island Records Philippines); "Gusto" – Zack Tabudlo feat. Al James (Republic Records Philippines); "Ikaw at Sila" – Moira Dela Torre (Republic Records Philippines); "Pantropiko" – Bini (Star Music); "Raining in Manila" – Lola Amour (Warner Music Philippines); "Saan" – Maki (Tarsier Records)
Male Recording Artist of the Year	Female Recording Artist of the Year
**Juan Karlos – "Ere" (Island Records Philippines); and**; **Ogie Alcasid – "Huwag Mo ‘Kong Iwan" (Star Music) (tied)**; Bamboo – "Treading Water" (Viva Records and G Productions); Billy Crawford – "Love Is In The Air" (Viva Records); Christian Bautista – "You Are Everything" (Universal Records); Erik Santos – "Kasunod" (Star Music); Zack Tabudlo – "Akin Ka" (Republic Records Philippines)	**Sarah Geronimo – "Habang Buhay" (Viva Records and G Productions)**; Julie Anne San Jose – "Something" (Universal Records); Katrina Velarde – "Ako Ba o Siya" (Viva Records); KZ Tandingan – "Walang Kapalit" (CS Music); Moira Dela Torre – "Pangako" (Star Music); Morissette – "Something All We Know" (Underdog Music Philippines); Regine Velasquez – "Nag-iisa Lang" (Star Music); Yeng Constantino – "Hamon Ng Mundo" (Vehnee Saturno Music)
New Male Recording Artist of the Year	New Female Recording Artist of the Year
**Dionela – "Oksihina" (UMG Philippines)**; Drei Sugay – "Ganun Talaga" (Star Music); Jeri Violago – "Gusto Kita" (Tarsier Records); Khimo – "Nasunog" (Star Music); Krisostomo – "Laging Ikaw" (Viva Records); Mico Angeles – "Ligaw Na Bala" (Enterphil Entertainment); Paolo Sandejas – Different Shades of Blue (Universal Records)	**Atasha Muhlach – "Pasuyo" (Vicor Music)**; Jemay Santiago – "May Iba Na Ba" (Sony Music Philippines); Laverne Arceo – "Kahit Ilang Ulit" (Independent); Lindsay Bolanos – "Pusong Nagmamahal" (PolyEast Records); Lizzie Aguinaldo – "Baka Puwede Na" (Star Music); Lyka Estrella – "Hawak Ko" (Star Music); Shaira – "Selos" (Independent); Vivoree – "Matapang" (Star Music)
Duo/Group of the Year	New Group of the Year
**Bini – "Pantropiko" (Star Music)**; Ben&Ben – "Autumn" (Sony Music Philippines); December Avenue – "Wala ng Iba" (Tower of Doom Music); InnerVoices – "Anghel" (Vehnee Saturno Music); SB19 – "Gento" (Sony Music Philippines); The Juans – "Back Home" (Viva Records)	**Bilib – "Kabanata" (AQ Music)**; AJAA – "Hany" (CS Music); Dear Dahlia – "Malabo" (Universal Records); Hori7on – "Dash" (MLD Entertainment); Skygarden – "Kokoa" (AltG Records)
Music Video of the Year	
**"The Way You Look At Me" – Ben&Ben (Sony Music Philippines)**; **Blas Tanquilut, director**	

=== Pop category ===
Pop Album of the Year	Male Pop Artist of the Year
**"3rd Time's A Charm" – Zack Tabudlo (Republic Records Philippines)**; "Chapters" – Garrett Bolden (GMA Music); "Reimagined" – Yeng Constantino (Republic Records Philippines); "Senaryo" – Adie (O/C Records)	**Donny Pangilinan – "Biglaan" (Universal Records); and**; **Maki – "Saan" (Tarsier Records) (tied)**; James Reid – "So Fire" (Careless Music); John Roa – "Deliks" (Viva Records); KD Estrada – "Led Us Here" (Star Music); Matt Lozano – "Liham" (GMA Music); Sam Concepcion – "Kapit" (Universal Records)
Female Pop Artist of the Year	
**Belle Mariano – "Bugambilya" (Star Music)**; Alexa Ilacad – "Be With U" (Star Music); Janine Berdin – "Sitwasyonship" (UMG Philippines); Julie Anne San Jose – "Something" (Universal Records); Lyka Estrella – "Hawak Mo" (Star Music); Marion Aunor – "Delikado" (Viva Records); Nadine Lustre – "Overgrown" (Wild Recordings)	

=== Rock, Rap, RnB and Acoustic category ===
Rock Album of the Year	Rock Artist of the Year
**"Sad Songs and Bullshits Part 1" – Juan Karlos (MCA Music)**; "Di Man Lang Sinabi" – Agsunta (Bauhaus Talent Management); "Kalangitan" – Nobita (Vicor Music); "Panic In My Mind" – The Itchyworms (Sony Music Philippines); "Sansinukob" – Dilaw (Warner Music Philippines)	**Lola Amour – "Raining in Manila" (Warner Music Philippines)**; Agsunta – "Di Man Lang Sinabi" (Bauhaus Talent Management); Dilaw – "Orasa" (Warner Music Philippines); The Itchyworms – "Panic in My Mind" (Sony Music Philippines); IV of Spades – "Come Inside of My Heart" (Warner Music Philippines]); Juan Karlos – "Ere" (Island Records Philippines); Lily – "Stars" (Star Music)
RnB Male Artist of the Year	RnB Female Artist of the Year
**Kris Lawrence – "Buti Na Lang" (Homeworkz Entertainment Services)**; Billy Crawford – "Love Is In The Air" (Viva Records); Garrett Bolden – "Kung Malaya Lang Ako" (GMA Music); Jason Dy – "Ulit Ulit" (Star Music); Jay R – "Guiding Star" (Homeworkz Entertainment Services); Jojo Santor – "Tahan Na" (Independent); Khimo – "Nasunog" (Star Music)	**KZ Tandingan – "Kailan Pa Ma’y Ikaw" (Universal Records)**; AC Bonifacio – "4 Myself" (Tarsier Records); Deny – "Alam Ko Na" (Viva Records); Kyla – "Hanggang Kailan" (Star Music)
Rap Album of the Year	Rap Artist of the Year
**"Pilak" – Gloc-9 (Universal Records)**; "Guns and Roses" – Shanti Dope feat. Hellmerry (Universal Records); Meron Na – Loonie (Believe Music)	**Flow G – "Rapstar" (Independent)**; Al James – "Atin-Atin Lang" (Boomplay Music); Gloc-9 – "Bahay Yugyugan" (Universal Records); King Promdi – "Piccolo" (Toxic Lifestyle Entertainment); Loonie – "XXXX" (Believe Music); Sassa Gurl – "Maria Hiwaga" (Independent); Shanti Dope – "Palagi" (Universal Records) Philippines
Male Acoustic Artist of the Year	Female Acoustic Artist of the Year
**Arthur Miguel – "Paano?" (Warner Music Philippines)**; Daniel Paringit – "Sa 'Yo (Heto Na Naman)" (Island Records Philippines); Davey Langit – "Ipagpanata Kita" (A Team PH); Jason Marvin – "Yaman" (Sony Music Philippines); Paolo Sandejas – "After Taste" (Universal Records); Toneejay – "711" (Marilag Recordings International Inc.)	**Moira Dela Torre – "Eme" (Republic Records Philippines)**; Ica Frias – "Ayoko Na" (Off The Record); Marion Aunor – "Nahulog" (Wild Dream Records); Misha de Leon – "Damdamin" (Star Music)
Collaboration of the Year	Inspirational Song of the Year
**Gloc-9 and Gary Valenciano – "Walang Pumapalakpak" (Universal Records)**	**"Isasayaw Kita" – InnerVoices (Vehnee Saturno Music)**

=== Novelty category ===
Novelty Song of the Year	Novelty Artist of the Year
**"Rampa" – Vice Ganda (Star Music); and**; **"Autodeadma" – Maymay Entrata (Star Music) (tied)**	**Kim Chiu – "Ms. Ukay" (Star Music)**

=== Album category ===
Dance Album of the Year	Revival Album of the Year
**"Gento" – SB19 (Sony Music Philippines)**; "4 Myself" – AC Bonifacio (Tarsier Records); "Dancing On My Own" – Janah Zaplan (StarPop); "Dare You" – Kiana Valenciano (Kiana V Music); "Kabanata" – Bilib (AQ Music); "Matapang" – Vivoree (Star Music); "Pantropiko" – Bini (Star Music)	**"Stars" – Lily (Star Music)**

=== Concert category ===
Concert of the Year	Male Concert Performer of the Year
**Dear Heart – Sharon Cuneta and Gabby Concepcion (NY Entourage Productions)**	**Christian Bautista – The Way You Look at Me: 20th Anniversary Concert (Stages Production Specialist, Inc.); and**; **Jed Madela – "Here and Now: The Jed Madela 20th Anniversary Concert (Creazon Studios) (tied)**
Female Concert Performer of the Year	Duo/Group Concert of the Year
**Regine Velasquez – Regine Rocks (iMusic Entertainment Inc.)**	**SB19 – Pagtatag World Tour: Manila**

=== Special awards ===
**Pilita Corrales Lifetime Achievement Award**
- **Gary Valenciano**
**Gawad Parangal Levi Celerio**
- **Homer Flores**

== Performers ==
Below are the performers:

- AXIS
- Maymay Entrata
- BILIB
- Kris Lawrence
- Ice Seguerra
- Jonathan Urbano
- Ivan Lee Espinosa
- Dominique Casacop
- Jed Madela
- Homer Flores
- Hannah Flores
- Christian Bautista
- Ogie Alcasid
- Gary Valenciano
- Manoeuvres Ignite
