= List of awards and nominations received by Shanti Dope =

Shanti Dope awards and nominations
Awards and nominations
Award	Wins	Nominations
Aliw Awards	1	2
Awit Awards	5	12
MOR Pinoy Music Awards	1	3
Myx Music Awards	1	15
PMPC Star Awards for Music	2	4
Push Awards	0	3
PPOP Awards for Young Artists	1	1
Wave 89.1 Special OPM Awards	1	2
Wish 107.5 Music Awards	1	7

Totals (Note: Certain award groups do not simply award one winner. They acknowledge several different recipients, have runners-up, and have third place. Since this is a specific recognition and is different from losing an award, runner-up mentions are considered wins in this award tally. For simplification and to avoid errors, each award in this list has been presumed to have had a prior nomination.)
- Wins: 13
- Nominations: 49

Shanti Dope is a Filipino rapper and songwriter. He is known for his songs "Nadarang", "Shantidope", and "Amatz".

Starting his music career in 2017, Shanti Dope has won 13 awards, including five Awit Awards, a Wish Music Award, an Aliw Award, and a Myx Music Award.

== Aliw Awards ==
Year	Nominee / work	Award	Result
2018	Himself	Best New Artist (Male)	Won
2018	Himself	Best Performer in Hotel, Music Lounges and Bars	Nominated

== Awit Awards ==
Year	Nominee / work	Award	Result
2018	"Nadarang"	Best Rap/Hip Hop Recording	Won
2020	"Amatz"	Best Performance by a Male Recording Artist	Nominated
2020	"Imposible" (with KZ Tandingan)	Best Collaboration	Won
2020	"Pati Pato" (with Gloc-9 and Chito Miranda)	Best Collaboration	Nominated
2020	"Imposible" (with KZ Tandingan)	Song of the Year	Won
2020	"Imposible" (with KZ Tandingan)	Record of the Year	Nominated
2020	"Amatz"	Best Best Rap/Hip Hop Recording	Won
2020	"Pati Pato" (with Gloc-9 and Chito Miranda)	Best Best Rap/Hip Hop Recording	Nominated
2020	"Imposible" (with KZ Tandingan)	Best R&B Recording	Nominated
2020	"Imposible" (with KZ Tandingan)	Music Video of the Year	Nominated
2020	"Amatz"	Music Video of the Year	Nominated
2024	"Bad Type"	Best Rap/Hip Hop Recording	Won

== MOR Pinoy Music Awards ==
Year	Nominee / work	Award	Result
2019	"Nadarang"	Song of the Year	Nominated
2019	"Nadarang"	LSS Hit of the Year	Nominated
2019	Himself	Best New Artist of the Year	Won

== Myx Music Awards ==
The Myx Music Awards are an accolade presented by the cable channel Myx to honor the biggest hitmakers in the Philippines. Shanti Dope has received 15 nominations, winning one.

Year	Nominee / work	Award	Result
2019	"Shantidope" (featuring Gloc-9)	Music Video of the Year	Nominated
2019	"Nadarang"	Song of the Year	Nominated
2019	"Nadarang"	Urban Video of the Year	Won
2019	"Norem" (Gloc-9 featuring J. Kris, Abaddon, and Shanti Dope)	Urban Video of the Year	Nominated
2019	Himself	Artist of the Year	Nominated
2019	Himself	Male Artist of the Year	Nominated
2019	Himself	New Artist of the Year	Nominated
2020	"Amatz"	Music Video of the Year	Nominated
2020	"Amatz"	Urban Video of the Year	Nominated
2020	"Imposible" (with KZ)	Music Video of the Year	Nominated
2020	"Imposible" (with KZ)	Song of the Year	Nominated
2020	"Imposible" (with KZ)	Urban Video of the Year	Nominated
2020	"Imposible" (with KZ)	Collaboration of the Year	Nominated
2021	"Teknik" (featuring Buddah)	R&B/Hip-Hop Video of the Year	Nominated
2021	"Pati Pato (Parokya Remix)" (with Parokya ni Edgar and Gloc-9)	Collaboration of the Year	Nominated

== PMPC Star Awards for Music ==
Year	Nominee / work	Award	Result
2018	"Nadarang"	Song of the Year	Nominated
2018	Materyal	Rap Album of the Year	Won
2018	Himself	Rap Artist of the Year	Nominated
2026	Drugs	Rap Album of the Year	Won

== PPOP Awards for Young Artists ==
Year	Nominee / work	Award	Result
2018	Himself	Rising Pop Rap Artist of the Year	Won

== Push Awards ==
Year	Nominee / work	Award	Result
2018	"Nadarang"	Push Music Performance of the Year	Nominated
2018	Himself	Push Newcomer of the Year	Nominated
2019	"Imposible" (with KZ Tandingan)	Push Original Music of the Year	Nominated

== Wave 89.1 Special OPM Awards ==
Year	Nominee / work	Award	Result
2020	"Lutang" (featuring Bry Mnzno, BuddahBeads, and EJAC)	Best Collab	Nominated
2020	"Normalan"	Best Hip Hop Solo	Won

== Wish 107.5 Music Awards ==
Year	Nominee / work	Award	Result
2019	Himself (for the song "Nadarang")	Wishclusive Hip-hop Performance of the Year	Nominated
2019	"Shantidope" (featuring Gloc-9)	Wish Hip-hop Song of the Year	Won
2019	Himself	Wish Promising Artist of the Year	Nominated
2020	"Imposible" (with KZ Tandingan)	Wishclusive Collaboration of the Year	Nominated
2020	"Pati Pato" Remix (with Gloc-9, Chito Miranda, and DJ Klumcee)	Wish Hip-hop Song of the Year	Nominated
2022	"Teknik" (featuring Buddah)	Wish Hip-hop Song of the Year	Nominated
2023	"Kamusta" (with Flow G)	Wish Song Collaboration of the Year	Nominated
