= Myx Music Awards 2024 =

Annual Philippine music awards ceremony

Myx Awards 2024
- Date: November 21, 2024
- Location: ABS-CBN Broadcasting Center, Quezon City
- Country: Philippines
- Hosted by: Samm Alvero; Edward Barber

Highlights
- Most awards: Al James; Bini; SB19 (2 each)
- Most nominations: Hev Abi (5)
- Website: myx.global/myxawards

Television/radio coverage
- Network: Myx

The Myx Awards 2024 was the 17th installment of the Myx Music Awards, acknowledging the biggest hit makers of 2024 in the Philippine music industry. Samm Alvero and Edward Barber are the presenters of this edition.

Nominees were announced on September 27, 2024, through the music channel's digital accounts. Voting begins on October 5, 2024, and ended on November 10, 2024.

The awards night was held on November 21, 2024 at the ABS-CBN Broadcasting Center in Quezon City, exclusively live streamed on YouTube.

Rapper Al James, and P-pop groups Bini and SB19 tying for the most wins with two. Rapper Gloc-9 receives Myx Magna Award. On the same night, Kring Prologo and Pinoy Big Brother: Gen 11 housemate Jarren Garcia are the co-winners of Myx VJ Search.

== Winners and nominees ==
Winners are listed first and highlighted in boldface.

Myx Magna Award (special award)	Music Video of the Year
**Gloc-9**	**"Moonlight" – Ian Asher, SB19 and Terry Zhong (Director: Kerbs Balagtas)**; "B.A.D." – Denise Julia feat. P-Lo (Directors: Louie Ong and Carissa King); "Cherry on Top" – Bini (Director: Kerbs Balagtas); "Dilaw" – Maki (Directors: Jaydee Alberto and Maki); "Surreal" – Justin (Directors: Justin de Dios and Xi-Anne Avenceña)
Song of the Year	Artist of the Year
**"Pantropiko" – Bini**; "Dilaw" – Maki; "Ere" – Juan Karlos; "Raining in Manila" – Lola Amour; "Sining" – Dionela feat. Jay R	**SB19**; Bini; Lola Amour; Juan Karlos; Maki
Breakout Solo Artist of the Year	Breakout Group of the Year
**Maki**; Demi; Denise Julia; Dionela; Hev Abi	**Cup of Joe**; Dilaw; Playertwo; Sugarcane; SunKissed Lola
Mellow Video of the Year	Pop Video of the Year
**"Surreal" – Justin (Directors: Justin de Dios and Xi-Anne Avenceña)**; "Iyo" – Darren Espanto (Director: Niq Ablao); "Palagi" – TJ Monterde (Director: Dan Villegas); "Turn Back Time" – Zack Tabudlo feat. Violette Wautier (Director: Prach Rojanasinwilai); "Walang Hanggan" – Alamat (Director: Jason Paul Laxamana)	**"Salamin, Salamin" – Bini (Director: Kerbs Balagtas)**; "Dayang" – Alamat (Director: Kerbs Balagtas); "Patintero" – BGYO (Director: Karlo Calingao); "Room" – Stell (Director: Kerbs Balagtas); "Tsada Mahigugma" – Maymay Entrata (Director: Carl Tejada)
R&B Video of the Year	Rock Video of the Year
**"Yoko Na" – Josh Cullen and Al James (Directors: Kerbs Balagtas and Josh Cullen)**; "B.A.D." – Denise Julia feat. P-Lo (Directors: Louie Ong and Carissa King); "Marikit sa Dilim" – Juan and Kyle feat. Jawz (Director: Louie Ong); "Pakundangan" – Demi feat. Hev Abi (Director: Jonas Ibanez); "Sining" – Dionela feat. Jay R (Directors: Tim Dionela, Tristan Ortega and Raven Sta. Ana)	**"Fake Faces" – Felip (Director: John Karlo Calingao)**; "Ere" – Juan Karlos (Director: Raliug); "Misteryoso" – Cup of Joe (Directors: Justin de Dios and Jay-ar Villarojas); "Orasa" – Dilaw (Director: Raliug); "Raining in Manila" – Lola Amour (Director: Marius Talampas)
Hip-Hop Video of the Year	Collaboration of the Year
**"Atin-Atin Lang" – Al James feat. Flow G (Directors: Y. Stacey and Naki)**; "Alam Mo Ba Girl" – Hev Abi (Director: Tokseen); "Burgis" – Flow G and Hev Abi (Directors: Titus Cee and Jon Gutierrez); "Get Low" – O Side Mafia and Brgr (Director: Macdave Edosma); "We Made It" – Nik Makino feat. Flow G (Director: Louie Ong)	**"Determinado" – Pablo and Josue**; "B.A.D." – Denise Julia feat. P-Lo; "Pakundangan" – Demi feat. Hev Abi; "Sining" – Dionela feat. Jay R; "Yoko Na" – Josh Cullen and Al James
Global Video of the Year	Myx Global Impact
**"Espresso" – Sabrina Carpenter**; "Fortnight" – Taylor Swift feat. Post Malone; "Rockstar" – Lisa; "Water" – Tyla; "We Can't Be Friends (Wait for Your Love)" – Ariana Grande	**Beabadoobee**

== Multiple awards ==
=== Artists with multiple wins ===
The following artists received two or more awards:

Wins	Artists
2	Al James
2	Bini
2	SB19

=== Artists with multiple nominations ===
The following artists received more than two nominations:

Nominations	Artists
5	Hev Abi
4	Denise Julia
4	Dionela
4	Maki
3	Al James
3	Bini
3	Jay R
3	Juan Karlos
3	Lola Amour
