= Buwan =

2018 song by Juan Karlos

- Cover art for Buwan

Single by Juan Karlos
- Released: June 22, 2018
- Recorded: 2018
- Genre: Alternative rock
- Length: 5:43
- Label: MCA Music
- Songwriter: Juan Karlos Labajo
- Producers: Juan Karlos Labajo; Abe Hipolito; Enrico Ilacad

Juan Karlos singles chronology
"Demonyo" (2018)	"Buwan" (2018)	"Sistema" (2018)

Music video
- "Buwan" on YouTube

"Buwan" (transl. "Moon") is a song written and sung by Filipino singer-songwriter, Juan Karlos Labajo, under the band name Juan Karlos. It was released on June 22, 2018, through MCA Music. The song became one of the most played OPM songs of 2018, winning Song of the Year at the 2019 Myx Music Awards, 2019 Awit Award for People's Voice Favorite Song. "Buwan" received huge popularity and started as a song challenge through social media platforms in the Philippines even overseas.

== Live performances ==
Labajo premiered "Buwan" during his concert on May 19, 2019. He also performed the song on Mutia Ti Bauang 2019 (beauty pageant). Labajo also performed it during Rakrakan Festival 2019 and at GMMSF Awards Night and various malls in the Philippines. He also made a kundiman version (a genre of traditional Filipino love songs) of the song with his band.

== Music video ==
The music video depicts Labajo tying and blindfolding a woman (Maureen Wroblewitz) inside a dimly lit room as he navigates their tumultuous relationship. This scenario is eventually revealed to be an illusion, as Labajo finds himself trapped in a cycle with the woman, who appears as a ghost embracing him while he sits in a chair. Fans have interpreted this as symbolizing intense and serious love towards Wroblewitz, who was in a relationship with Labajo at the time. Additionally, fans noted the use of the word "Buwan" in the song and linked it to "Luna," suggesting that Labajo's aggressive behavior towards the woman in the video represents a lunatic or frenzied state.

The official music video, released and posted on YouTube on September 24, 2018, has garnered over 174 million views as of April 2024; the music video reached 40 million in two months. It is also the most liked and most viewed OPM music video in 2018 with 144 million views, surpassing Yeng Constantino's "Ikaw" which had over 105 million views.

== Notable covers ==
- Regine Velasquez performed her version on ASAP stage.
- Angeline Quinto uploaded her version on her YouTube Channel.
- Bugoy Drilon performed buwan reggae version and uploaded on his YouTube channel.

== Accolades ==
Year	Awards ceremony	Category	Nominated version	Result	Ref.
2019	4th Wish Music Awards	Wish Rock/Alternative Song of the Year	"Buwan"	Won	
2019	4th Golden Laurel Media Awards	Song of the Year	"Buwan"	Won	
2019	14th Myx Music Awards	Song of the Year	"Buwan"	Won	
2019	6th MOR Pinoy Music Awards	Song of the Year	"Buwan"	Won	
2019	32nd Awit Awards	Best Performance by a Male Recording Artist	"Buwan"	Won	
2019	32nd Awit Awards	Song of the Year	"Buwan"	Nominated	
2019	32nd Awit Awards	Record of the year	"Buwan"	Nominated	
2019	32nd Awit Awards	Best Rock/Alternative Recording	"Buwan"	Won	
2019	32nd Awit Awards	People's Voice Favorite Song	"Buwan"	Won	
2019	32nd Awit Awards	People's Voice Favorite Record	"Buwan"	Won	
2020	11th PMPC Star Awards for Music	Song of the Year	"Buwan"	Won	
2020	33rd Awit Awards	Best Folk Recording	"Buwan (Kundiman version)"	Nominated	
