= Myx Magna Award =

MYX Magna Award
- Awarded for: exemplary contribution in the Philippine music industry
- Country: Philippines
- Presented by: Myx
- First award: 2006
- Final award: 2024
- Currently held by: Gloc-9 (2024)
- Website: MYX Music Awards

The MYX Magna Award is a special award presented annually by Myx. It was first awarded at the first Myx Music Awards in 2006; Sharon Cuneta won the award, and it is given in honor of a music icon with an exemplary contribution in the Philippine music industry.

== Special Award winners ==
Year	Artist(s)/Group	Ref
2006 (1st)	Sharon Cuneta	
2007 (2nd)	APO Hiking Society	
2008 (3rd)	Gary Valenciano	
2009 (4th)	Eraserheads	
2010 (5th)	Jose Mari Chan	
2011 (6th)	Regine Velasquez	
2012 (7th)	Ryan Cayabyab	
2013 (8th)	Lea Salonga	
2014 (9th)	Parokya Ni Edgar	
2015 (10th)	Rey Valera	
2016 (11th)	Ogie Alcasid	
2017 (12th)	Vic del Rosario	
2018 (13th)	Martin Nievera	
2019 (14th)	Rivermaya	
2020 (15th)	Francis Magalona (posthumous)	
2021 (16th)	Asin	
2024 (17th)	Gloc-9	

== Gallery of recipients ==
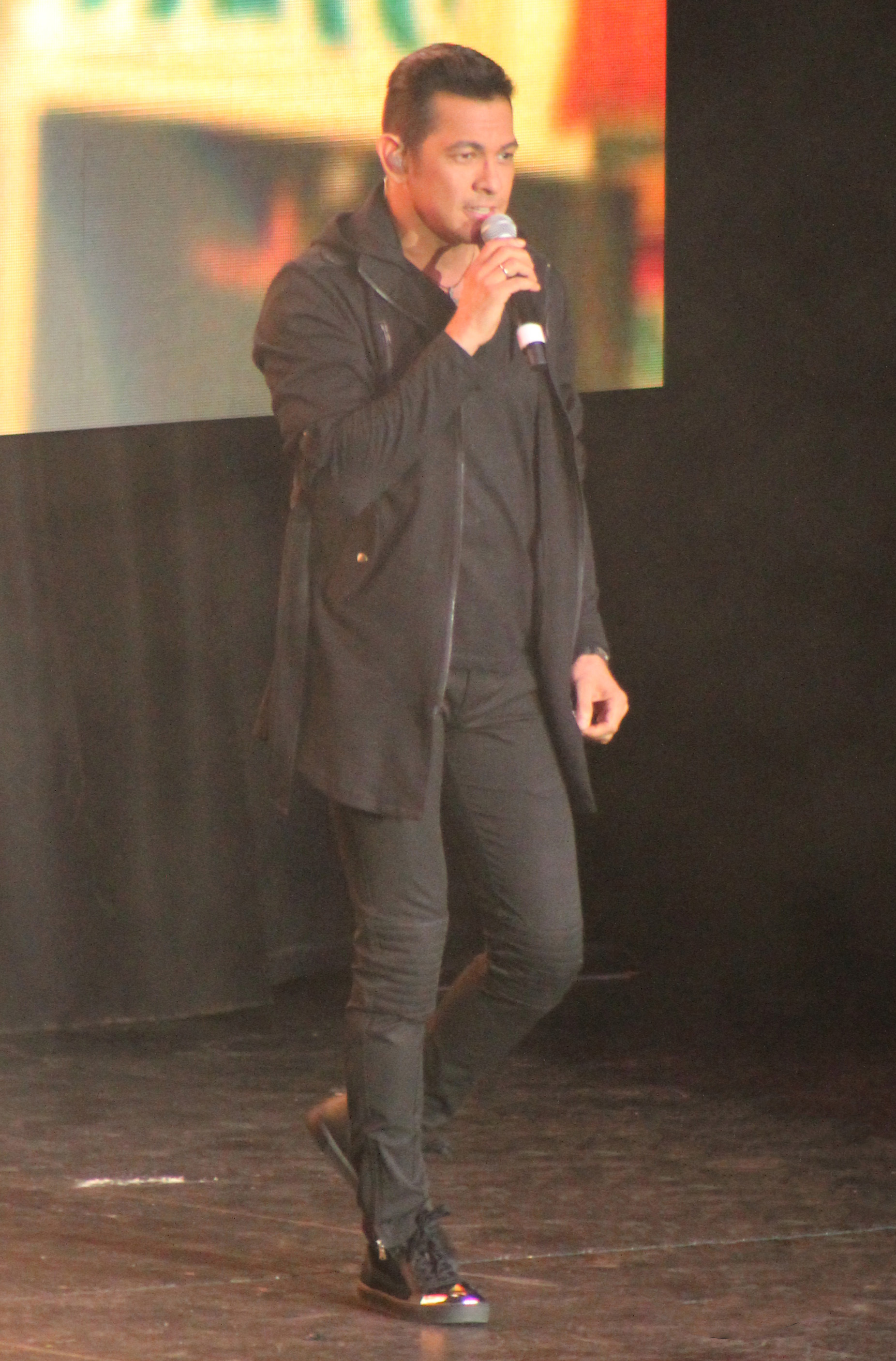
Gary Valenciano, (2008)

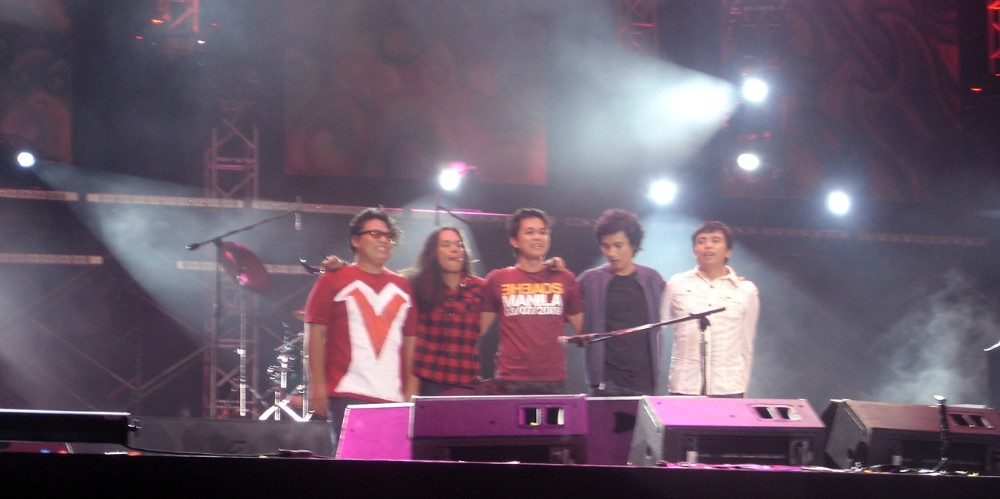
Eraserheads, (2009)

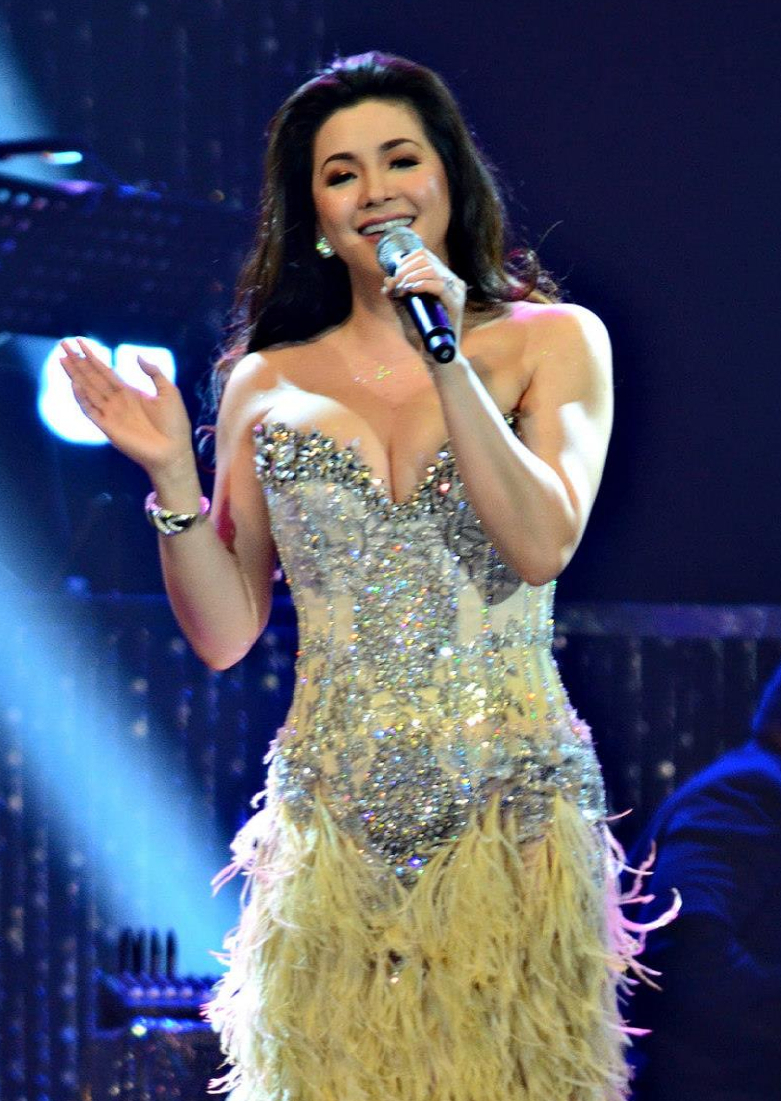
Regine Velasquez, (2011)

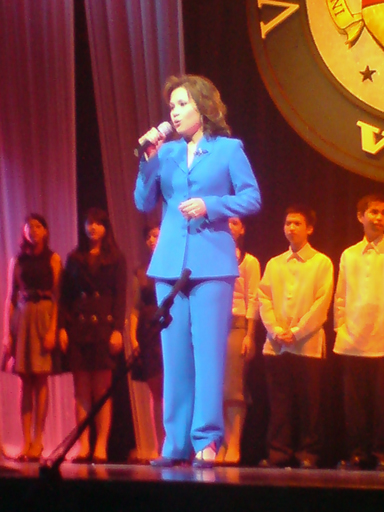
Lea Salonga, (2013)

Rey Valera, (2015)
