= Raining in Manila =

2023 single by Lola Amour

Single by Lola Amour

from the album Lola Amour
- Language: English; Tagalog
- Released: June 14, 2023
- Studio: Spryta Productions, Inc.
- Genre: City pop
- Length: 4:51
- Label: Warner Music Philippines
- Songwriters: Pio Dumayas; Raymond King
- Composers: David Yuhico; Pio Dumayas; Raymond King

Lola Amour singles chronology
"Madali" (2022)	"Raining in Manila" (2023)	"Namimiss Ko Na" (2024)

Music video
- "Raining in Manila" on YouTube

"Raining in Manila" is a song by the Filipino rock band Lola Amour and the lead single from their self-titled debut studio album (2024). It was released on June 14, 2023, by Warner Music Philippines. Pio Dumayas and Raymond King wrote the track and composed it with David Yuhico. A city pop tune, "Raining in Manila" is about the feelings that ensue after a friend's departure to another country, inspired by Dumayas' personal experiences.

"Raining in Manila" peaked at number two on the Philippines Songs record chart and received the biggest streaming day and week for a Filipino song on Spotify at the time. (Note: Both were broken by "Ere" (2023) from the band Juan Karlos.) The accompanying music video, directed by Mairus Talampas, depicted Manila in a flooded state and focused on two lovers reconnecting with each other.

== Background and composition ==
Warner Music Philippines released "Raining in Manila" on June 14, 2023. Its lyric video was released on the band's YouTube channel the next day.

"Raining in Manila" was written by Pio Dumayas and Raymond King, both of whom composed it with David Yuhico. It was recorded by Rener Serna at Spryta Productions, Inc. The song was mixed by Jorel Corpus and mastered by Jeff Galindo, who had done the process at Bakery Mastering. The sound of "Raining in Manila" was heavily inspired by Japanese city pop, a genre used by Kenneth Valladolid of Wish 107.5 to classify the track. It was described by Manu Dumayas as their "hardest song to play".

At 4 minutes and 51 seconds long, "Raining in Manila" incorporates two breakdowns during its duration. According to the song's credits, the instruments on it were bass (played by King), drums (Raffy Perez), electric guitar (Zoe Gonzales), keyboard (Yuhico), trumpet (M. Dumayas and Raffy Perez), and tenor saxophone (Jeff Abueg). With this instrumentation, the track incorporates strings, syncopated brass riffs, and saxophone solos. Writing for Billboard Philippines, Kara Angan believed that it borrowed elements from other Lola Amour songs, specifically citing "Fools" (2017) and "Pwede Ba" (2018).

"Raining in Manila" was written for P. Dumayas' friends, those who left the Philippines to pursue a better life. In the lyrics, P. Dumayas reminisces on a person with whom he had a close relationship and shows no signs of going back to Manila again. He continues to be concerned about them ("Cause it's been raining in Manila, hindi ka ba nilalamig? Mahirap bang mag isang nanginginig?") (lit. 'Cause it's been raining in Manila, aren't you cold? Is it hard to be shivering alone?'), and "wishes them happiness and [...] that they are doing well".

== Reception ==
"Raining in Manila" came out at the time when the wet season was prevailing in the Philippines. Some journalists believed that this was an ideal period to release the song and that its lyrics about missing someone would be even more appealing at this time. In the month of July, "Raining in Manila" broke the records for the biggest streaming day and week for a Filipino song on Spotify. On the Philippines Songs record chart, the track peaked at number two for eleven weeks, kept from the top spot by Jungkook's "Seven" (2023). It tied with Zack Tabudlo's "Habang Buhay" (2021) as the longest song at number two without reaching atop the chart. According to the chart's 2023 year-end issue, "Raining in Manila" was the 13th biggest song and 5th biggest OPM track of 2023 within the Philippines.

Critical reviews for "Raining in Manila" were generally positive. Some of whom thought it delivered a "playful" production that contrasts the song's melancholy lyrics. Robert Requintina of Manila Bulletin said that it "beautifully captures the essence of being in love and missing someone, and the struggles that come with it". In Bandwagon's list of the year's top tracks, "Raining in Manila" was featured—Camille Castillo lauded the efforts that was put into the song and picked it as Lola Amour's best track to date. Billboard Philippines also included the song on their list of the year's 25 best songs.

== Music video ==
=== Synopsis ===
The music video for "Raining in Manila" was directed by Mairus Talampas and produced by the Arcade Film Factory. The video's premise is a fictional reality of Manila in a flooded setting with continuous rain going on for 1427 days. The narrative focuses on a man named John (Jal Galang) grieving over his wife Sheila (Kat Galang), who went missing when the rain began. John reconnects with Sheila, believing that she turned into a "magic" gecko, and prepares an aquarium and a dinner to show his love for her. He later discovers that she has been abducted and tries to fight for his life to get her back. The video concludes with Sheila transforming into a human-sized gecko and the rain stopping.

=== Release and reception ===
The video was announced in a 30-second teaser released on Lola Amour's social media accounts on October 24, 2023—it depicts the band singing joyfully in a bangka during a flood. The teaser was met with mixed to negative reactions from fans, who believed that it was idealizing poverty and the Philippines's experiences with natural disasters and that the group was being insensitive to people who suffer from such conditions. Lola Amour quickly responded to the teaser's reception and apologized for "not [being] sensitive enough" on the way it was presented. They added that fans should give the video a chance despite how inaccurate the teaser's portrayal of it was.

The video premiered on the band's YouTube channel on October 25, 2023; it raised over 50,000 views during that day. In an opinion piece, Eric Cabahug of The Philippine Star commented that the video had a "playful, dark comedic tone" that made it "odd" to watch. He also criticized how it featured violence in a disturbing and superfluous manner that made the final scene "eerie". On the other hand, the video was voted as one of the year's best music videos in a poll by Billboard Philippines, where the publication described it as cinematic and the story unconventional and creative.

== Live performances and covers ==
Lola Amour debuted "Raining in Manila" during the "We Play Here" concert series on April 27, 2023, and dedicated it to the former bandmates Joxx Perez and Renzo Santos. The band reprised their performance at the Castaway Music Festival in May 2023. To promote the song after it was released, they embarked on the Raining in Manila Tour, which started at Manila on August 12 and ended at Parklinks on November 26. Aside from that, Lola Amour performed "Raining in Manila" live at The Cozy Cove, Rappler, and at the Wish 107.5 Bus, all of which were uploaded onto YouTube. They also shared an official performance of the song and an "Ambon" version both recorded at Spyrta Studio on YouTube.

On January 19, 2024, the band performed an acoustic version of "Raining in Manila" during British rock band Coldplay's concert at the Philippine Arena. Coldplay's lead singer Chris Martin sang a few lines of the song before inviting Lola Amour to perform the rest of the song on stage.

South Korean singer Chanyeol performed the song twice during his concert at the Araneta Coliseum on October 19, 2024.

Lola Amour performed "Raining in Manila" at the closing ceremony of the 2025 FIFA Futsal Women's World Cup at the PhilSports Arena on December 7, 2025.

== Accolades ==
Awards and nominations for "Raining in Manila"
Award	Year	Category	Result	Ref.
Awit Awards	2024	Record of the Year	Won	
Awit Awards	2024	Song of the Year	Won	
Awit Awards	2024	Best Performance by a Group	Nominated	
Awit Awards	2024	Best Alternative Recording	Nominated	
Awit Awards	2024	Best Novelty Recording for "Waiting Here sa Pila"	Won	
Awit Awards	2024	Best Pop Recording	Won	
Awit Awards	2024	Best Remix Recording for "Raining in Manila (DJ Young Remix)"	Nominated	
Music Awards Japan	2025	Philippine Popular Music Special Award	Won	
Myx Music Awards	2024	Song of the Year	Nominated	
Nylon Manila Big Bold Brave Awards	2024	Gen-Z Approved Hit	Nominated	
PMPC Star Awards for Music	2024	Song of the Year	Nominated	
Wish 107.5 Music Awards	2024	Wishclusive Rock/Alternative Performance of the Year	Nominated	

== Personnel ==
Credits are adapted from YouTube and Wish 107.5.

- Pio Dumayas – vocals, writer, composer
- Raymond King – writer, composer, bass
- David Yuhico – composer, keyboard
- Zoe Gonzales – electric guitar
- Angelo Mesina – trumpet
- Jeff Abueg – tenor saxophone
- Manu Dumayas – trumpet
- Raffy Perez – drums
- Rener Serna – recording
- Jorel Corpus – mixing
- Jeff Galindo – mastering

== Charts ==
=== Weekly chart ===
Weekly chart performance for "Raining in Manila"
Chart (2023)	Position
Philippines (Billboard)	2

=== Year-end chart ===
Year-end chart performance for "Raining in Manila"
Chart (2023)	Position
Philippines (Billboard)	13
