= Myx Music Awards 2020 =

Annual Philippine music awards ceremony

Myx Awards 2020
- Date: July 25, 2020
- Country: Philippines
- Hosted by: Myx VJs

Highlights
- Most awards: SB19 (3)
- Most nominations: IV of Spades (6), Shanti Dope (6)
- Website: myx.abs-cbn.com/myxawards

Television/radio coverage
- Network: Myx

Myx Awards 2020 is the 15th installment of the Myx Music Awards, acknowledging the biggest hit makers of 2019 in the Philippine music industry. The awards were held virtually due to the ongoing coronavirus pandemic.

Nominees were announced on May 21, 2020 starting at 3:00 pm via Facebook, Twitter, and YouTube live streaming. IV of Spades and Shanti Dope led the nominees with six nominations each. For the ninth consecutive year, fans voted online through the Myx website. Voting ended on July 10.

A notable change made to the award system this year was the reduction in the total number of categories awarded, from 18 to 10.

== Performances ==
Since the awards show happened virtually, all performances were recorded specifically for the MYX Music Awards 2020.

List of musical performances
Artist(s)	Song(s)
SB19	"Go Up"
Route 83	"Ania Ko"
Julie Anne San Jose	"Better"
Valentina Ploy	"Love You Better"
Ava Max	"Kings & Queens"
KZ and Shanti Dope	"Imposible"
Iñigo Pascual	"Balang Araw"
Powfu	"Death Bed (Coffee for Your Head)"
Gary Valenciano; Chito Miranda; Raimund Marasigan; Yael Yuzon; Saab Magalona-Bacarro; Elmo Magalona; Barq	"Kaleidoscope World"
Anne-Marie	"To Be Young"
Ben&Ben	"Lifetime"

== Winners and nominees ==
Winners are listed first and highlighted in boldface.

Myx Magna Award (special award)	Music Video of the Year
**Francis Magalona** (posthumous)	**"Summer" – James Reid and Nadine Lustre (Directors: Chino Villagracia and Nadine Lustre)**; "Amatz" – Shanti Dope (Directors: Hush Magtoto and JC Echanes); "Come Inside of My Heart" – IV of Spades (Directors: Raymond Dacones and Trina Razon); "Imposible" – KZ and Shanti Dope (Director: Edrex Clyde Sanchez); "Options" – Iñigo Pascual (Director: Dawittgold)
Song of the Year	Artist of the Year
**"Go Up" – SB19**; "Come Inside of My Heart" – IV of Spades; "Imposible" – KZ and Shanti Dope; "Mabagal" – Daniel Padilla and Moira Dela Torre; "Pagtingin" – Ben&Ben	**SB19**; Ben&Ben; Iñigo Pascual; IV of Spades; Moira Dela Torre
New Artist of the Year	Mellow Video of the Year
**SB19**; Gibbs; Kakie; Syd Hartha; Zephanie	**"Mabagal" – Daniel Padilla and Moira Dela Torre (Director: Peewee Azarcon Gonzales)**; "365 Araw ng Eroplanong Papel" – MNL48 (Director: Carlo Francisco Manatad); "Huling Sandali" – December Avenue (Director: Andrei Antonio); "Kakayanin Kaya" – Maymay Entrata (Director: Miko Pelino); "Pagtingin" – Ben&Ben (Director: Jorel Lising)
Rock Video of the Year	Urban Video of the Year
**"Come Inside of My Heart" – IV of Spades (Directors: Raymond Dacones and Trina Razon)**; "Manila" – One Click Straight (Directors: Raymond Dacones and Trina Razon); "Nagbabalik" – Rico Blanco and IV of Spades (Director: RA Rivera); "Peklat Cream" – Bita and the Botflies (Director: Kevin Dayrit); "Sino" – Unique (Director: Kean Cipriano)	**"Fiend" – James Reid featuring Just Hush (Director: Dominic Bekaert)**; "Amatz" – Shanti Dope (Directors: Hush Magtoto and JC Echanes); "Dalaga" – ALLMO$T (Director: Mhellan Narciso); "Imposible" – KZ and Shanti Dope (Director: Edrex Clyde Sanchez); "Pull It Off" – Alex Bruce (Director: Jiggy Gregorio)
Collaboration of the Year	International Video of the Year
**"Mabagal" – Daniel Padilla and Moira Dela Torre**; "Imposible" – KZ and Shanti Dope; "Maleta" – Gloc-9 and Julie Anne San Jose; "Nagbabalik" – Rico Blanco and IV of Spades; "Patawad, Paalam" – Moira Dela Torre and I Belong to the Zoo	**"Boy with Luv" – BTS featuring Halsey**; "7 Rings" – Ariana Grande; "Lover" – Taylor Swift; "Señorita" – Shawn Mendes and Camila Cabello; "Sucker" – Jonas Brothers
Myx Celebrity VJ of the Year	Spotify's Top OPM Hip-Hop Artist of 2019
**Kiara Takahashi and Gino Roque**; CK Kieron and Vivoree Esclito; Kyle Echarri and Andrea Brillantes; Ricci Rivero; Diana Zubiri, Iza Calzado, Karylle, and Sunshine Dizon; Yam Concepcion; Ylona Garcia; Michael V.; Kakie; Lou Yanong and Andre Brouillette; Franki Russell and Diana Mackey; Fumiya Sankai and Yamyam Gucong	**Skusta Clee**

== Multiple awards ==
=== Artists with multiple wins ===
The following artists received two or more awards:

Wins	Artists
3	SB19
2	Daniel Padilla
2	James Reid
2	Moira Dela Torre

=== Artists with multiple nominations ===
The following artists received more than two nominations:

Nominations	Artists
6	IV of Spades
6	Shanti Dope
4	Moira Dela Torre
