= Materyal =

EP by Shanti Dope
- Released: December 8, 2017
- Genre: Pinoy hip hop
- Label: Universal Records

Shanti Dope chronology
Shanti Dope (2017)	Materyal (2017)	Basic (2022)

Materyal (transl. Material) is the first EP by Filipino rapper Shanti Dope, released on December 8, 2017, under Universal Records. Materyal has 5 tracks. The final track, Norem, also appeared in the Rotonda EP by Gloc-9. Aside from the song Norem, Gloc-9 is also featured in the song Shantidope.

Materyal won the Rap Album of the Year at the 10th PMPC Star Awards for Music.

The lead track of the EP, "Nadarang", won the Best Rap/Hip-hop Recording at the 31st Awit Awards.

== Track listing ==
Materyal
No.	Title	Writer(s)	Length
1.	"Shantidope" (featuring Gloc-9)	Gloc-9; MC Cruz; Shanti Dope	3:31
2.	"Bodega"	Shanti Dope; Lester "Klumcee" Vano	1:28
3.	"Materyal"	MC Cruz; Shanti Dope	4:06
4.	"Nadarang"	Shanti Dope; Lester "Klumcee" Vano	3:52
5.	"Norem" (featuring Gloc-9, Abaddon & Jkris)	Gloc-9	4:44
Total length:			13:49
