= Myx Music Awards 2019 =

Annual Philippine music awards ceremony

- Date: May 15, 2019
- Location: ABS-CBN Vertis Tent, Quezon City
- Country: Philippines
- Hosted by: Myx VJs

Highlights
- Most awards: Nadine Lustre (4)
- Most nominations: Shanti Dope (8); Moira Dela Torre (7); IV of Spades (5)
- Website: myx.abs-cbn.com/myxmusicawards

Television/radio coverage
- Network: Myx

Myx Music Awards 2019 was the 14th installment of the Myx Music Awards, acknowledging the biggest hit makers of 2018 in the Philippine music industry. For the eight consecutive year, fans could vote online through the Myx website.

Nominees were announced on March 13, 2019 starting at 2:00 pm via Facebook and YouTube Live streaming. Leading the nominees was Shanti Dope with eight nominations.

For the second consecutive year, Twitter Philippines launched the MYX Music Awards 2019 exclusive emoji for using hashtags #MYXMusicAwards2019 and #MMAs2019. The popular streaming service, Spotify also made an exclusive playlist of songs nominated on the awards as well as the winners playlist.

The awards night was held on May 15, 2019 at the ABS-CBN Vertis Tent in Quezon City. It was broadcast live on MYX channel on cable and ABS-CBN TV Plus and live streamed on YouTube.

== Winners and nominees ==
Winners are listed first and highlighted in boldface.

Myx Magna Award (special award)	Music Video of the Year
**Rivermaya**	**"St4y Up" – Nadine Lustre (Director: Petersen Vargas)**; "In My Prison" – IV of Spades (Director: Raymond Dacones); "Pinipigil" – Yeng Constantino (Director: Paul Alexei Basinillo); "Shantidope" – Shanti Dope feat. Gloc-9 (Director: Jc Echanes); "Tagpuan" – Moira Dela Torre (Director: John Prats)
Song of the Year	Artist of the Year
"**Buwan" – Juan Karlos**; "Kathang Isip" – Ben&Ben; "Mundo" – IV of Spades; "Nadarang" – Shanti Dope; "Tagpuan" – Moira Dela Torre	**Nadine Lustre**; IV of Spades; Darren Espanto; Moira Dela Torre; Shanti Dope
Male Artist of the Year	Female Artist of the Year
**Darren Espanto**; Iñigo Pascual; Sam Mangubat; Shanti Dope; Unique	**Nadine Lustre**; Julie Anne San Jose; Moira Dela Torre; Morissette; Yeng Constantino
Group of the Year	New Artist of the Year
**Boyband PH**; Ben&Ben; December Avenue; IV of Spades; Juan Karlos	**I Belong To The Zoo**; AC Bonifacio; Jayda Avanzado; Kyline Alcantara; Shanti Dope
Mellow Video of the Year	Rock Video of the Year
**"Tagpuan" – Moira Dela Torre (Director: John Prats)**; "Ako Muna" – Yeng Constantino (Director: Miguel Alomajan); "Oks Lang" – John Roa (Director: Andrei Antonio); "Fix You And Me" – Kyla (Director: John Prats); "Tayong Dalawa" – Julie Anne San Jose (Director: Jc Echanes)	**"In My Prison" – IV of Spades (Director: Raymond Dacones)**; "Cha-ching!" – Unique (Director: Unique; "Kunwari" – Sponge Cola (Director: Yael Yuzon); "Revalation" – Chicosci (Director: Kevin Mayuga); "Sisikat Muli Ang Araw" – Itchyworms (Director: Adrian Arcega)
Urban Video of the Year	Collaboration of the Year
**"Nadarang" – Shanti Dope (Director: Hush Magtoto)**; "Lame" – Midnasty (Director: Francis James Kho); "Misfits" – Kiana (Director: Luis Daniel Tabuena); "Ngayong Gabi" – Al James (Director: J. Estacio); "Norem" – Gloc-9 feat. J.kris, Abaddon and Shanti Dope (Director: Jc Echanes)	**"Kung 'Di Rin Lang Ikaw" – December Avenue feat. Moira Dela Torre**; "Dambana" – Silent Sanctuary feat. Aia De Leon; "Down For Me" – Julie Anne San Jose feat. Fern.; "Shantidope" – Shanti Dope feat. Gloc-9; "Take It To Forever" – Jona, Jay R and Req
Remake of the Year	Media Soundtrack of the Year
**"Dying Inside To Hold You" – Darren Espanto**; "Be My Fairytale" – Janella Salvador; "Di Na Muli" – Janine Tenoso; "I Will Be Here" – Alden Richards; Pagbigyang Muli" – Erik Santos and Regine Velasquez-Alcasid	'**"Prom" – James Reid And Nadine Lustre**; "Be My Fairytale" – Janella Salvador; "Di Na Muli" – Janine Tenoso; "Kahit Maputi Na Ang Buhok Ko" – Moira Dela Torre; "Maybe The Night" – Ben&Ben
Music Video Guest Appearance of the Year	International Video of the Year
**Maris Racal ("Lumang Tugtugin" – Iñigo Pascual)**; Barbie Imperial ("Sa Mga Bituin Na Lang Ibubulong" – JM de Guzman); Elisse Joson ("Para Sa Tabi" – BoybandPH); Empoy ("Pinipigil" – Yeng Constantino); Tony Labrusca ("Sugarol" – Maris Racal)	**"Fake Love" – BTS**; "Delicate" – Taylor Swift; "Girls Like You" – Maroon 5 feat. Cardi B; "Thank U, Next" – Ariana Grande; "Thru These Tears" – LANY
MYX Celebrity VJ of the Year	MYX Bandarito Performance of the Year
**AC Bonifacio**; Alex Gonzaga; Arci Muñoz; Barbie Imperial; Cast of Spirits Reawaken; Donna Cariaga; Elmo Magalona and Janella Salvador; JC Santos; Kakai Bautista; Maja Salvador; Nathalie Hart; Tony Labrusca	**I Belong To The Zoo**; Bita and the Botflies; Nathan and Mercury; Over October; St. Wolf

== Multiple awards ==
=== Artists with multiple wins ===
The following artists received two or more awards:

Wins	Artists
4	Nadine Lustre
2	Darren Espanto
2	I Belong to the Zoo
2	Moira Dela Torre

=== Artists with multiple nominations ===
The following artists received more than two nominations:

Nominations	Artists
8	Shanti Dope
7	Moira Dela Torre
5	IV of Spades
3	Ben&Ben
3	Darren Espanto
3	Gloc-9
3	Janella Salvador
3	Janine Tenoso
3	Julie Anne San Jose
3	Yeng Constantino
2	AC Bonifacio
2	Barbie Imperial
2	December Avenue
2	I Belong to the Zoo
2	Juan Karlos
2	Tony Labrusca
2	Unique
