= Amatz =

Song by Filipino rapper Shanti Dope

Single by Shanti Dope
- Released: March 22, 2019
- Genre: Hip hop; trap
- Label: Universal
- Composers: Sean Patrick Ramos; Lester Vaño
- Producer: Klumcee

Shanti Dope singles chronology
"Namamasko Po" (2018)	"Amatz" (2019)	"Imposible" (2019)

Music video
- "Amatz" on YouTube

Amatz is a song by Filipino rapper Shanti Dope that was released under Universal Records on March 22, 2019. The word "Amatz" is a slang word for Tagalog “tama” or kick, which could refer to being drunk or high on drugs.

== Controversy ==
Several months after the release of the song, Philippine Drug Enforcement Agency (PDEA) proposed to ban the song for allegedly promoting drug use. According to the agency, Shanti, in his song, was referring to the high effect of marijuana, being in its natural/organic state and not altered by any chemical compound. Thus, the PDEA requested the Movie and Television Review and Classification Board (MTRCB), the Organisasyon ng Pilipinong Mang-aawit, and the ABS-CBN Corporation to prevent the airing of the song and its promotion in the different media stations throughout the country.

The management of Shanti criticized PDEA over its call to ban the song. According to them, "Amatz" isn't about drugs or marijuana but music – which makes the song's persona "fly." They also added that the ban sets a dangerous precedent for creative and artistic freedom in the country, when a drug enforcement agency can unilaterally decide on what a song is about, and call for its complete ban because it is presumed to go against the government's war on illegal drugs.

On 17 June 2019, the Kapisanan ng mga Brodkaster ng Pilipinas (KBP) banned the song from being aired on all its member TV and radio stations following an order from the National Telecommunications Commission and granting the request by PDEA to do such.

Both Shanti Dope and the Concerned Artists of the Philippines slammed Aaron Aquino's move, with the artist group even reminding PDEA that it's not its job to be a music critic.

== Accolades ==
Despite the ban, "Amatz" managed to have nominations from the Awit Awards and the Myx Music Awards. At the 33rd Awit Awards, "Amatz" was nominated for "Best Performance by a Male Recording Artist" and "Music Video of the Year", but lost to "Karera" by TJ Monterde and "Headlights" by Sud respectively. Nonetheless, "Amatz" won the "Best Best Rap/Hip Hop Recording" in the same awards show. "Amatz" was also nominated in the Myx Awards 2020 in "Music Video of the Year" and "Urban Video of the Year" losing both to "Summer" by James Reid and Nadine Lustre and "Fiend" also by James Reid respectively.

Year	Organization	Award	Result	Ref.
2020	Awit Awards	Best Performance by a Male Recording Artist	Nominated	
2020	Awit Awards	Music Video of the Year	Nominated	
2020	Awit Awards	Best Best Rap/Hip Hop Recording	Won	
2020	Myx Music Awards	Music Video of the Year	Nominated	
2020	Myx Music Awards	Urban Video of the Year	Nominated	

== Usage in media ==
"Amatz" was featured in the third episode of the Marvel Cinematic Universe television series, The Falcon and the Winter Soldier, which was released onto Disney+ on April 2, 2021.

== Track listing ==
Digital download
No.	Title	Length
1.	"Amatz"	3:54

== Charts ==
Chart performance for "Amatz"
Chart (2021)	Peak position
US World Digital Song Sales (Billboard)	10
