= Juan Karlos =

Filipino rock band

juan karlos
- Origin: Manila, Philippines
- Genres: Alternative rock; pop rock; acoustic rock; blues rock; OPM
- Years active: 2017–2020; 2021–present
- Labels: Island; MCA; Star Magic; Tuazon
- Members: Juan Karlos Labajo; Louise Bayas; Jeriko Aguilar
- Past members: Abe Hipolito; Juan Carlo Hipolito; Marcus Ambat; Clark Cunanan; Gian Hipolito

Juan Karlos (commonly stylized in all lowercase) is a Filipino rock band from Manila, consisting of lead vocalist, rhythm guitarist, primary songwriter, and only constant member Juan Karlos Labajo, together with lead guitarist Jeriko Aguilar and bassist Louise Bayas. The band first gained exposure with the release of their second single, "Buwan".

== History ==
In 2018, Filipino musician and actor Juan Karlos Labajo revealed that he was forming a band named after him.

Their first studio album, Diwa, was released in March 2020.

Their second album, Sad Songs & Bullshit Part 1, came out in September 2023 and was followed by Sad Songs & Bullshit Part 2 in June 2024. On October 8, 2023, the single "Ere" became the first Filipino song to appear on the Spotify Global chart. It was also the first Filipino song on Spotify to receive more than one million streams in a single day.

== Band members ==
Current

- Juan Karlos Labajo – lead vocals, rhythm guitar (2017–present)
- Louise Bayas – bass, backing vocals (2018, 2020–present)
- Jeriko Aguilar – lead guitar (2020–present)

Past

- Abe Hipolito – lead guitar, backing vocals (2017–2018)
- Juan Carlo Hipolito – lead guitars (2019)
- Clark Cunanan – bass, backing vocals (2018–2020)
- Marcus Ambat – lead guitar, backing vocals (2018–2019)
- Nim Laquian – lead guitar (2019)
- Gian Hipolito – drums (2017–2021)

Touring members

- Xergio Ramos – guitars
- Ira Cruz – guitars
- Rommel dela Cruz – bass
- Karel Honasan – bass
- Timothy Recla – keyboards
- Junjun Regalado – drums
- Victor Guison – drums
- Rickson Ruiz – drums

== Discography ==
=== Studio albums ===
Title	Album details
Diwa	Released: March 20, 2020; Label: MCA Music; Formats: Digital download, streaming
Sad Songs and Bullshit Part 1	Released: September 22, 2023; Label: Island; Formats: Digital download, streaming
Sad Songs and Bullshit Part 2	Released: June 21, 2024; Label: Island; Formats: Digital download, streaming

=== EPs ===
Title	EP details
Drop 1	Released: March 31, 2022; Label: Island; Formats: Digital download, streaming

=== Singles ===
==== As lead artist ====
Title	Year	Peak chart positions			Album
Title	Year	PHL (Note: The Billboard Philippines Songs chart was first introduced in February 2022. It was discontinued after the relaunch of the Philippines Hot 100 chart.)	NZ Hot	WW Excl. US	Album
"Demonyo (Redefined)"	2018	—	—	—	Non-album singles
"Buwan"	2018	—	—	—	Non-album singles
"Sistema"	2018	—	—	—	Diwa
"Biyak"	2019	—	—	—	Diwa
"Kalawakan"	2019	—	—	—	Diwa
"Sampaguita" (featuring Gloc-9)	2020	—	—	—	Diwa
"Bless U"	2020	—	—	—	Non-album singles
"Boston"	2021	—	—	—	Non-album singles
"Kunwari"	2022	—	—	—	Non-album singles
"Araw"	2022	—	—	—	Non-album singles
"Shot Puno"	2022	—	—	—	Non-album singles
"may halaga pa ba ako sayo??"	2023	—	—	—	Sad Songs and Bullshit Part 1
"Gabi" (featuring Zild)	2023	—	—	—	Sad Songs and Bullshit Part 1
"Ere"	2023	1	21	121	Sad Songs and Bullshit Part 1
"Tapusin Na Natin To" (featuring Paolo Benjamin of Ben&Ben)	2023	—	—	—	Sad Songs and Bullshit Part 1
"Kasing Kasing" featuring Kyle Echarri	2024	—	—	—	Sad Songs and Bullshit Part 2
"Limang Taon"	2024	—	—	—	Sad Songs and Bullshit Part 2
"Tanga Mo Juan"	2024	—	—	—	Sad Songs and Bullshit Part 2
"Through the Years"	2024	—	—	—	Lolo and the Kid OST
"Ang Himala ay Nasa Puso"	2024	—	—	—	Isang Himala OST

==== As featured artist ====
Title	Year	Album
"Lunod" (Ben&Ben featuring Zild and Juan Karlos)	2021	Pebble House, Vol. 1: Kuwaderno

== Awards and nominations ==
Year	Organization	Category	Nominated work	Result	Ref.
2019	4th Wish Music Awards	Wish Rock/Alternative Song of the Year	"Buwan"	Won	
2019	4th Golden Laurel Media Awards	Song of the Year	"Buwan"	Won	
2019	4th Golden Laurel Media Awards	Breakthrough Music Artist of the Year (Band)	—N/a	Nominated	
2019	14th Myx Music Awards	Song of the Year	"Buwan"	Won	
2019	14th Myx Music Awards	Group of the Year	—N/a	Nominated	
2019	6th MOR Pinoy Music Awards	Song of the Year	"Buwan"	Won	
2019	32nd Awit Awards	Song of the Year	"Buwan"	Nominated	
2019	32nd Awit Awards	Record of the Year	"Buwan"	Nominated	
2019	32nd Awit Awards	Best Pop Recording	"Buwan"	Nominated	
2019	32nd Awit Awards	Best Rock/Alternative Recording	"Buwan"	Won	
2019	32nd Awit Awards	People's Voice Favorite Song	"Buwan"	Won	
2019	32nd Awit Awards	People's Voice Favorite Record	"Buwan"	Won	
2020	11th PMPC Star Awards for Music	Song of the Year	"Buwan"	Won	
2020	33rd Awit Awards	Record of the Year	"Kalawakan"	Nominated	
2020	33rd Awit Awards	Record of the Year	"Biyak"	Nominated	
2020	33rd Awit Awards	Best Folk Recording	"Buwan (Kundiman version)"	Nominated	
2021	16th Myx Music Awards	Rock Video of the Year	"Kalawakan"	Nominated	
2021	16th Myx Music Awards	Collaboration of the Year	"Sampaguita" (with Gloc-9)	Nominated	
2021	34th Awit Awards	Album of the Year	Diwa	Nominated	
2021	34th Awit Awards	Best Collaboration	"Sampaguita" (with Gloc-9)	Nominated	
2022	7th Wish Music Awards	Wishclusive Contemporary Folk Performance of the Year	"Boston"	Nominated	
2022	7th Wish Music Awards	Wish Song Collaboration of the Year	"Lunod" (with Ben&Ben and Zild)	Won	
2022	35th Awit Awards	Best Music Video	"Lunod" (with Ben&Ben and Zild)	Won	
2022	35th Awit Awards	Best Rock/Alternative Recording	"Lunod" (with Ben&Ben and Zild)	Nominated	
2022	35th Awit Awards	Best Collaboration	"Lunod" (with Ben&Ben and Zild)	Nominated	
2022	35th Awit Awards	Best Musical Arrangement	"Lunod" (with Ben&Ben and Zild)	Nominated	
2022	35th Awit Awards	Best Engineered Recording	"Lunod" (with Ben&Ben and Zild)	Nominated	
2023	8th Wish Music Awards	Wish Contemporary Folk Song of the Year	"Kunwari"	Nominated	
2023	8th Wish Music Awards	Wish Song Collaboration of the Year	"Pancit" (with Janine Berdin)	Nominated	
2024	17th Myx Music Awards	Song of the Year	"Ere"	Nominated	
2024	17th Myx Music Awards	Rock Video of the Year	"Ere"	Nominated	
