= Ere (song) =

2023 song by Juan Karlos

Single by Juan Karlos

from the album Sad Songs and Bullshit Part 1
- Released: August 4, 2023
- Recorded: 2023
- Genre: Alternative rock
- Length: 4:44
- Label: Island Records Philippines
- Songwriter: Juan Karlos Labajo
- Producer: Juan Karlos Labajo

Juan Karlos singles chronology
"Gabi" (2023)	"Ere" (2023)	"Tapusin Na Natin To" (2023)

Music video
- "Ere" on YouTube

"Ere" (lit. '"Air"'; stylized in all caps) is a song recorded by Filipino singer-songwriter Juan Karlos Labajo. Under the band name Juan Karlos. The power ballad released on August 4, 2023, via Island Records Philippines. Written and produced by Labajo, the song served as the second track of the album titled Sad Songs and Bullshit Part 1. It reached number one on Billboard's Philippines Songs chart for ten weeks and broke numerous streaming records on Spotify.

== Commercial performance ==
"Ere" debuted at No. 5 on Billboard's Philippines Songs chart. The song climbed to No. 1 the following week, dethroning "3D" by Jungkook and Jack Harlow. "Ere" also debuted at No. 138 on Billboard Global Excl. US chart, becoming the first Filipino song to appear on the chart. Following its growing popularity on both digital and streaming platforms, the song broke the record for the biggest single day streams in the Philippines on Spotify with 1.77 million streams, dethroning "Mine" by Taylor Swift. It also marked the first time a Filipino song entered the Top 100 of Spotify's global chart and the first Filipino song to accumulate over a million streams in a single day on the platform.

Elsewhere, "Ere" also debuted at No. 21 on New Zealand's Hot Singles, marking their first entry on the chart.

It ranked 82 on the Billboard Philippines' Philippines Hot 100 Year-End charts for 2024.

== Live performances ==
Juan Karlos has performed "Ere" at The Sad Tour and Realme Fanfest 2023 in Cebu City. The official live performance video of the song was uploaded on Juan Karlos' official YouTube channel on September 23, 2023. On October 22, 2023, the band performed the song at the New Frontier Theater as a special guest for the Danish pop band Lukas Graham's concert.

=== Controversy ===
==== Profanity incident at Dinagyang Festival ====
During the Dinagyang Festival, a religious and cultural celebration in Iloilo City, Juan Karlos Labajo performed the song and stirred controversy after he unintentionally included a translated swear word in its hook. The song’s chorus, which originally contains explicit language in Tagalog, was adapted into Hiligaynon during his performance, drawing mixed reactions from the local government. Reports suggest that Iloilo City Mayor Jerry Treñas is considering requesting a public apology from the artist for the use of inappropriate language during his guest performance. The Iloilo Festivals Foundation, Inc. (IFFI) clarified that while they oversee the selection of guest artists for the festival, they do not have full knowledge of the specific content of their performances.

== Listicles ==
Publisher	Year	Listicle	Placement	Ref.
Billboard Philippines	2023	The Top 25 Songs of 2023	Placed	

== Credits and personnel ==
Credits adapted from Apple Music.

- Juan Karlos – vocals, songwriter, producer, acoustic guitar
- Xergio Ramos – electric guitar
- Rickson Ruiz – drums
- Rommel dela Cruz – bass
- Emil dela Rosa – mastering engineer, mixing
- Nikhil Amarnani – recording engineer

== Charts ==
Weekly chart performance for "Ere"
Chart (2023)	Peak position
Global Excl. U.S. (Billboard)	121
New Zealand Hot Singles (RMNZ)	21
Philippines (Billboard)	1
UAE (IFPI)	7

== Accolades ==
Award	Year	Category	Result	Ref.
Awit Awards	2024	Record of the Year	Nominated	
Awit Awards	2024	Song of the Year	Nominated	
Awit Awards	2024	Best Alternative Recording	Won	
Myx Music Awards	2024	Song of the Year	Nominated	
Myx Music Awards	2024	Rock Video of the Year	Nominated	
PMPC Star Awards for Music	2024	Song of the Year	Nominated	

== Release history ==
Release dates and formats for "Ere"
Region	Date	Format(s)	Label	Ref.
Various	August 4, 2023	Digital download; streaming	Universal Music Philippines	

== See also ==
- 2023 in Philippine music
