= Lola Amour =

Filipino rock band

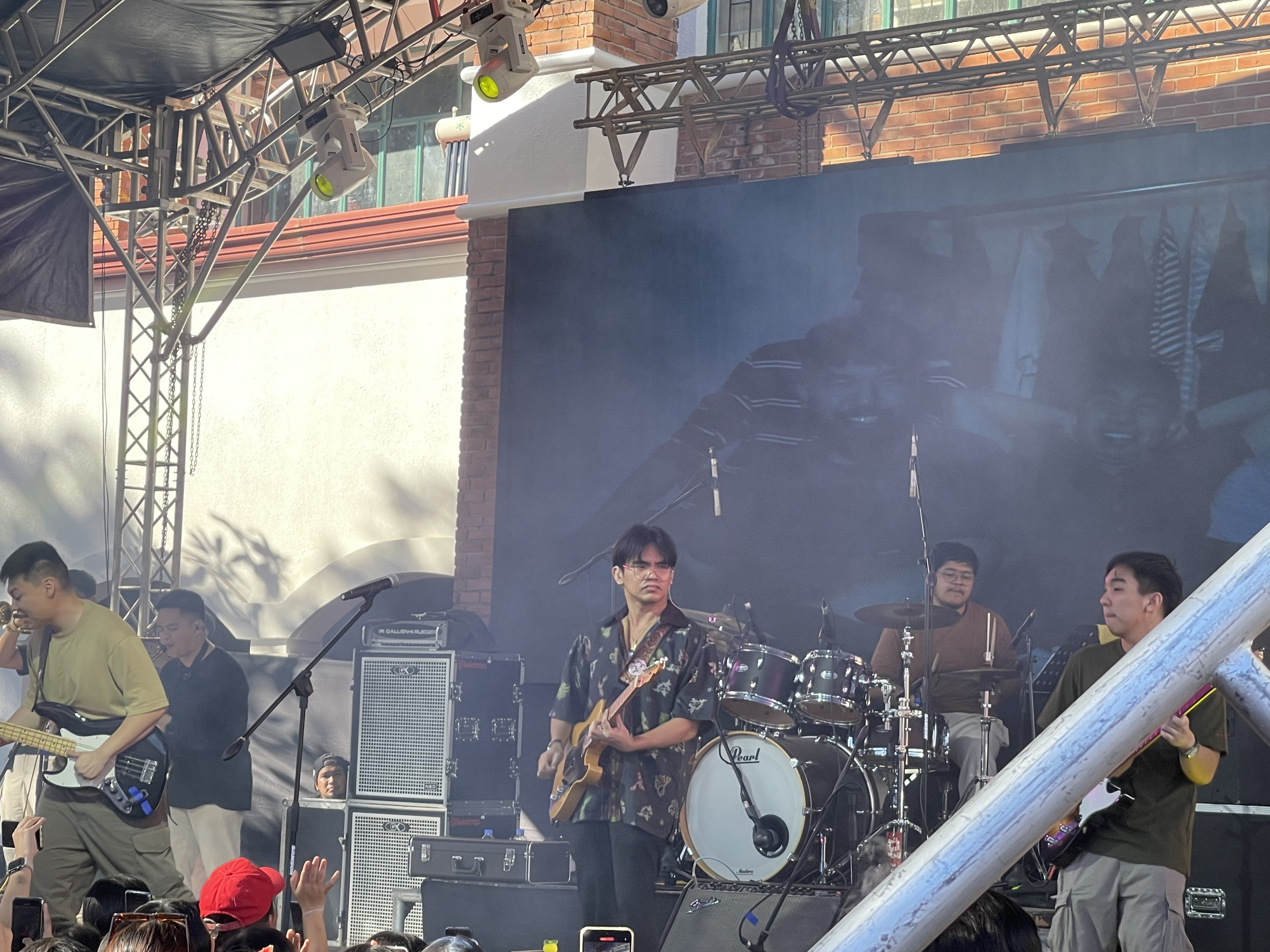
- Lola Amour in 2024

Background information
- Also known as: Lola Amour (2013–present); Sinigang na Baboy (2013–2014)
- Origin: Muntinlupa, Metro Manila, Philippines
- Genres: Alternative rock; funk rock; pop rock; jazz fusion
- Years active: 2013–present
- Members: Pio Dumayas; Manu Dumayas; Zoe Gonzales; Angelo Mesina; David Yuhico; Jeff Abueg; Raffy Perez
- Past members: Mico Fernandez; Martin Kim; Renzo Santos; Joxx Perez; Raymond King

Lola Amour is a Filipino rock band formed in Muntinlupa, Metro Manila, in 2013. The band consists of Pio Dumayas on lead vocals and rhythm guitar, David Yuhico on background vocals and keyboards, Manu Dumayas (who had previously served as a session musician for the band from 2017 to 2024) on bass, trumpet, and backing vocals, Zoe Gonzales on lead guitar, Angelo Mesina on trumpets, Jeff Abueg on saxophone and backing vocals, and Raffy Perez on drums. They dabble in the genres of modern rock, funk, and pop.

== History ==
=== Formation (2013–2016) ===
Lola Amour was formed in Muntinlupa from two rival bands, "Sinigang Na Baboy" (Pio Dumayas on vocals, Renzo Santos on drums, Joxx Perez on bass, Mico Fernandez on guitar) and "Decaf" (Raymond King on bass, Zoe Gonzalez on guitar, Martin Kim on vocals and Angelo Mesina on drums), comprising students from the De La Salle Santiago Zobel School (DLSZ). While the two bands always competed against each other in the annual school battle of the bands, they were friends as members of student music clubs such as the DLSZ Symphonic Orchestra and DLSZ Jammers. The two bands decided to merge and perform at their senior year graduation ball. When the group moved on to college, they officially adopted the name "Lola Amour", after the grandmother of vocalist Pio Dumayas.

=== Wanderland Music and Arts Festival (2016) ===
Lola Amour performed at the fourth Wanderland Music and Arts Festival. The band won Wanderband 2017, the annual battle of the local independent bands of the music festival.

=== Don't Look Back EP, "Pwede Ba" (2017–2018) ===
Soon after performing at the Wanderland Music and Arts Festival, Lola Amour released their first EP titled Don't Look Back, which consisted of four songs: "Fools", "Maybe Maybe", "No Tomorrow" and "Piece of Mind". They held a gig on Mow's Bar, Quezon City during the album launch.

At the end of 2018, the band released the single "Pwede Ba" (Is It Possible), a song which was reportedly written partly due to Pio's timidness on getting up to go to school, but was also written about "not wanting to separate from the people and things we love in spite of knowing that separation is inevitable". To this day, this has been one of their most popular songs and is often played live.

=== "Sanity", Coke Studio Philippines, Don't Look Back Revisited, "Fallen", Kim's departure (2019–2021) ===
On May 19, the band released the single "Sanity", which is about "the lingering ghosts we remain tethered to despite their absence and how we sometimes still feel chained down to them". Musically, the song sounds heavier than their previous releases, but does not stray far from the band's sound.

Lola Amour was included in the third season of the Coke Studio Philippines, an annual music television program in the Philippines. Notable songs released in this collaboration were "Sundan Mo Ko" (Follow Me) with rapper Al James, cover versions of "Pa-Umaga" (Morning) (original by Al James) and "Tuloy na Tuloy Pa Rin ang Pasko" (Christmas Will Still Continue) featuring Al James (original by APO Hiking Society).

The band was supposed to fully begin work on their debut album on 2019, with Pio looking back on it sounding "bad". Keyboardist Martin Kim returned to the Philippines after his mandatory military service in South Korea to reunite with the band and released a Korean version of "Pwede Ba", which features an acoustic arrangement. Ultimately, the next year's COVID-19 pandemic indefinitely shelved the album.

Lola Amour was featured on the Eraserheads tribute album Pop Machine the Album with a cover of "Shake Yer Head". It was released as a standalone single on March 20. According to bassist Raymond King, the cover is also based on Signed, Sealed, Delivered I'm Yours by Stevie Wonder.

Due to the album being shelved, the band decided to re-record their first EP, which resulted in Don't Look Back - Revisited, released on November 12. According to the band, “revisiting our old songs meant we couldn’t change the lyrics but it did leave us with a challenge: that is to find ways to create meaning through context. These songs were written back when we were teenagers and over the past few years, we’ve learned so much and grown into so much more than what we were then – both as artists and as people.” Musically, the album is stripped-down and more subdued from the original, with new track "Please Don't Leave", a piano-strewn ballad.

In early 2021, the band released "Fallen", a song about contemplating on expressing bottled up emotions for someone, knowing that an attempt would only bring turbulence in the friendship. The song was intended to be on the debut album until it was shelved. The band celebrated the launch by an online show, joined by sessionists/future members David Yuhico, Raffy Perez, and Jeff Abueg. This single turned out to be Kim's last single with the band, as he left on July 20 due to settling back in Korea. Yuhico then replaced him as keyboardist and backing vocalist.

Later that year, they collaborated with singer-songwriter Clara Benin on the single "Closer than Before", a song about "loving, losing, and then taking a chance to reconnect".

=== Singles, Perez and Santos's departure, Fallen Tour (2022) ===
2022's first two singles are collaborations with other artists. "Click" is a song inspired by heartbreak and old-school movies. It is partially written by drummer Renzo Santos. and features duo Leanne & Naara on additional lead and backing vocals. "Madali" (Hurry) is a rock song and their third song featuring Al James. Lyrically, it is a reminder for listeners to slow down and enjoy the little things in life.

On May 2, Lola Amour announced that they are bidding farewell to saxophonist Joxx Perez & Santos. They had their last appearance on an online concert documentary held at the PETA Theater on May 5. Raffy Perez (Joxx's brother) & Jeff Abueg joined the band as replacements for Santos and Joxx respectively. The concert was released as a live album, titled Looking Back (Live at the PETA Theater, 2022).

At this time, "Fallen" reached the Top Ten on Spotify Philippines. Due to this, the band embarked on the Fallen Tour with the new members. On September 14, the band released an EP titled The Lunchtime Special, which is a compilation of their three previous collaborations with other artists and their respective live versions from Looking Back. On October 12, the band released "dahan-dahan" (Very Slowly), a love song that "tells the story of two people who have fallen in and out of love so many times that it starts to feel like an elaborate dance — familiar yet new each time — making listeners think of whether they should go along with fate or against it".The song features a guitar solo played by Pio having a duet with King's bass, which is reportedly made to symbolize two figures dancing together.

=== "Raining in Manila", self-titled debut studio album and King's departure (2023–present) ===
"Raining in Manila" was released on June 14, 2023. Lyrically, it speaks of someone moving to the city from the province but missing his friends in the province. Musically, the song is inspired by Japanese city pop music. Lola Amour's self-titled debut studio album was initially scheduled for a 2023 release, but the band postponed it upon realizing the success of "Raining in Manila". According to Mesina, the band had been producing the album even before the COVID-19 pandemic. Due to the success of Raining in Manila, the band embarked on the Raining in Manila Tour. It was on that tour that the band found out that the song reached No. 1 on Spotify Philippines, cementing "Raining in Manila" as their signature song. Simultaneously with the song, the band released an EP titled Raining in Manila (Tour Edition), which contains remixes of the song alongside alternative versions.

"Raining in Manila" has received a degree of international attention. Enhypen member Jake covered the song during a Weverse live stream in July 2023. Thai singer BamBam also covered the song during his concert at the Araneta Coliseum on September 22, 2023, then later released a cover version on his social media. On January 19, 2024, English singer Chris Martin sang the song's first lines during his band Coldplay's concert at the Philippine Arena before inviting Lola Amour on stage to perform the song with him in front of a sold-out crowd of around 50,000.

On March 9 and 10, the band performed at the Wanderland Music and Arts Festival for a second time. The band was joined by former saxophonist Joxx and trumpeter Tim Cruz, his first appearance with the band, while Manu played bass in King's absence due to being in Singapore for Taylor Swift's Eras Tour concert.

On March 13, the band released "Namimiss Ko Na" (I Miss It Already), which preceded their debut album. Lyrically, King said that the song is about his grandmother suffering from dementia, and him coming to terms with her condition. Musically, it is a disco song that might be inspired by the music of VST & Co. On March 27, King announced that he would be leaving the band and would be replaced by longtime sessionist and Pio's brother Manu. King's last appearance with the group was at the Album Launch Concert at Circuit Grounds, Makati on April 13, which had former members Kim and Joxx as guests. Fellow indie Filipino bands Any Name's Okay and Cup of Joe kicked off the show, with hip-hop duo Playertwo performing at the aftershow.

Lola Amour's self-titled debut studio album was released on April 10, 2024. Consisting of nine tracks, it includes "Raining in Manila" and "Namimiss Ko Na". The band embarked on the Album Tour with sessionists Cruz and Nian Sayoc on trumpet and additional guitar respectively. King once appeared as an announcer on one of their concerts during the tour. The band also performed at the Miss Universe Coronation Night on May 22 as guest performers and are joined by Joxx on stage.

On June 19, 2025, Lola Amour’s Misbehave Mini Tour performed at Mow's Bar in Quezon City with grindcore band Tubero. The two bands brought very different sounds to the stage that night. The show also featured comedians and podcasters The Koolpals .

== Band members ==
=== Current members ===
- Pio Dumayas – lead vocals, rhythm guitar, (2013–present), studio harmonica and flute (2024), live percussion (2017), keyboards and bass (2013–2014, as part of Sinigang Na Baboy)
- Zoe Gonzales – lead guitar (2016–present), backing vocals (2024–present)
- Angelo Mesina – trumpet, live backing vocals, occasional guitar on videos (2016–present)
- David Yuhico – keyboards, occasional guitar in videos, backing vocals (sessionist 2021) (2021–present)
- Jeff Abueg – saxophone, clarinet, backing vocals (sessionist 2019–2023) (2023–present)
- Raffy Perez – drums (sessionist 2019–2023) (2023–present), occasional backing vocals (2024-present)
- Manu Dumayas – trumpet, guitar, bass, backing vocals (sessionist 2017–2024) (2024–present)

=== Sessionists ===
- Nian Sayoc – guitar, occasional live backing vocals (2018, 2024–present)
- Tim Cruz – trumpet, live backing vocals (2024–present)

=== Former members ===
- Mico Fernandez – guitar (2013–2016)
- Nathan Domagas – keyboards (2018–2020)
- Martin Kim – keyboards, backing vocals (2016–2021), occasional guitar and lead vocals (2019–2020, guest 2024)
- Joxx Perez – saxophone, occasional backing vocals (2013, 2016–2022, guest 2024), bass (2013)
- Renzo Santos – drums (2013–2022)
- Anjeli Panis – keyboards (2018)
- Maddy - guest vocals (2015–2018)
- Raymond King – bass, occasional guitar in videos, backing vocals, occasional lead vocals (2016–2024)

=== Other personnel ===
- Mika Ordoñez – general manager and booking agent

== Discography ==
=== Albums ===
Studio albums

- Lola Amour (2024)
- Love on Loop (2025)

Live albums

- Looking Back (Live at PETA Theater, 2022) (2022)
- Lola Amour: The Album Concert (Live) (2024)

=== EPs ===
- Don't Look Back (2017)
- Don't Look Back (Revisited) (2020)
- The Lunchtime Special (2022)
- Raining in Manila (Tour Edition) (2023)
- ulit-ulitin: the dahan-dahan trilogy (2024)

Singles

Year	Title	Album	References
2018	"Pwede Ba"		
2019	"Sanity"		
2019	"Pa-Umaga" (Cover) (with Al James)		
2019	"Sundan Mo Ko" (with Al James)		
2019	"Tuloy Na Tuloy Pa Rin Ang Pasko" (Cover) (with Al James)		
2020	" 괜찮을까 Pwede Ba (Korean Version)"		
2020	"Shake Yer Head" (Cover)	Pop Machine the Album	
2021	"Fallen"		
2021	"Closer Than Before" (featuring Clara Benin)	The Lunchtime Special	
2022	"Click" (featuring Leanne & Naara)	The Lunchtime Special	
2022	"Madali" (with Al James)	The Lunchtime Special	
2022	"dahan-dahan"	ulit-ulitin: the dahan-dahan trilogy	
2023	"Raining in Manila"	Lola Amour	
2023	"Huwag Na Huwag Mong Sasabihin" (Cover)		
2024	"Namimiss Ko Na"	Lola Amour	
2025	"Maria" (with Oliver Cronin)		
2025	"Dance with My Mistakes"	Love on Loop	
2025	"Misbehave"	Love on Loop	
2025	"Fallen (Extended Version)"		
2025	"Dance with My Mistakes (Live Extended Version)"		
2025	"The Moment" (with KOKORO from Psychic Fever from Exile Tribe)	Love on Loop	

== Accolades ==
Award	Year	Category	Recipient(s)	Result	Ref.
Awit Awards	2024	Song of the Year	"Raining in Manila"	Won	
Awit Awards	2024	Record of the Year	"Raining in Manila"	Won	
Awit Awards	2024	Best Pop Recording	"Raining in Manila"	Won	
Awit Awards	2024	Best Performance by a Group Artist	"Raining in Manila"	Nominated	
Awit Awards	2024	Best Alternative Recording	"Raining in Manila"	Nominated	
Awit Awards	2024	Best Novelty Recording	"Waiting Here Sa Pila" (with Michael V.)	Won	
Awit Awards	2024	Best Remix Recording	"Raining in Manila (DJ Young Remix)"	Nominated	
Awit Awards	2025	Album of the Year	Lola Amour	Nominated	
Awit Awards	2025	Recording of the Year	“Namimiss Ko Na”	Won	
Awit Awards	2025	Best Alternative Recording	“Namimiss Ko Na”	Won	
Awit Awards	2025	Best Musical Arrangement	“Namimiss Ko Na”	Nominated	
Awit Awards	2026	Album of the Year	Love on Loop	Nominated	
Awit Awards	2026	Best World Music Recording	"Love on Loop"	Won	
Awit Awards	2026	Songwriter of the Year	Lola Amour	Nominated	
Awit Awards	2026	Best Ballad Recording	"With You"	Nominated	
Awit Awards	2026	Best Alternative Recording	"Misbehave"	Nominated	
Awit Awards	2026	Best Dance/Electronic Recording	"Misbehave"	Nominated	
Awit Awards	2026	Best Rock/Hip hop Recording	"Take It To The Roof" (with Playertwo)	Nominated	
Filipino Music Awards	2025	Alternative Song of the Year	"Misbehave"	Nominated	
Monster RX 93.1 Music Awards	2026	OPM Alternative/Rock Artist of the Year	Lola Amour	Won	
Monster RX 93.1 Music Awards	2026	Concert Series Performer of the Year	Lola Amour	Won	
