= Shanti Dope =

Filipino rapper

- Born: Sean Patrick Ramos; April 15, 2001 (age 25); Quezon City, Philippines
- Origin: Bacoor, Cavite, Philippines
- Genres: Pinoy hip hop; trap
- Occupations: Rapper; musician; songwriter; actor
- Instrument: Vocals
- Years active: 2017–present
- Labels: Young God; Universal

Sean Patrick Ramos (born April 15, 2001), known professionally as Shanti Dope, is a Filipino rapper, singer and songwriter. He is known for his songs "Nadarang", "Shantidope", "MAU", and "Amatz".

== Early career ==
Shanti Dope started writing verses in 2013 following the footsteps of local rappers who use songwriting as a way to tell stories. Influenced by the idea of storytelling through rap, his first long verse got him into rapper Smugglaz' 2015 album Walking Distance.

== Discography ==
=== EPs ===
- Shanti Dope (2017)
- Materyal (2017)
- Basic (2022)
- Guns and Roses (2023)
- Drugs (2024)

=== Singles ===
- "Nadarang" (2017)
- "Shanti Dope" (featuring Gloc-9) (2017)
- "Mau" (featuring Putapetty Wap) (2017)
- "Apoy" (with Abra) (2018)
- "Norem" (with Gloc-9 featuring Abaddon and JKris) (2018)
- "Almost Love – Shanti Dope version" (with Sabrina Carpenter) (2018)
- "Crazy (International remix)" (with MiMi, NomaD, Krayzie Bone) (2018)
- "Bata, Dahan-Dahan x Nadarang" (with IV of Spades) (2018)
- "Sa Kahapon" (with IV of Spades) (2018)
- "Namamasko Po" (with IV of Spades) (2018)
- "Amatz" (2019)
- "Imposible" (with KZ Tandingan) (2019)
- "Pati Pato" (with Chito Miranda and Gloc-9) (2019)
- "Normalan" (2020)
- "Teknik" (2020)
- "Maya" (2022)
- "Kamusta" (with Flow G) (2022)
- "Day Onez" (with Rookie) (2022)
- "Tricks" (2022)
- "City Girl" (2022)
- "YGG" (with Hellmerry) (2023)
- "Real Love" (2024)
- "Highschool" (2024)
- "WADADADENG" (uncredited, with Hellmerry, Tus Brothers, Al Tus, Rudy Rude) (2024)
- "Say Hello" (with Hellmerry, Scoop Dogg)

== Filmography ==
=== Television ===
Year	Title	Role	Ref.
2023–24	Black Rider	Buboy Castillo	

== In other media ==
Shanti Dope's hit song, "Amatz" was featured in the Disney+ series The Falcon and the Winter Soldier (Episode 3: "Power Broker") during a scene where the Falcon and the Winter Soldier travel to Madripoor, a fictional Southeast Asian city.

== Awards and nominations ==
Shanti Dope won twelve awards from a total of 48 nominations in his career.

== See also ==
- List of awards and nominations received by Shanti Dope
- Filipino hip hop
- Al James
- List of Filipino hip hop artists
